= All Under One Banner Cymru =

Welsh pro-independence organisation

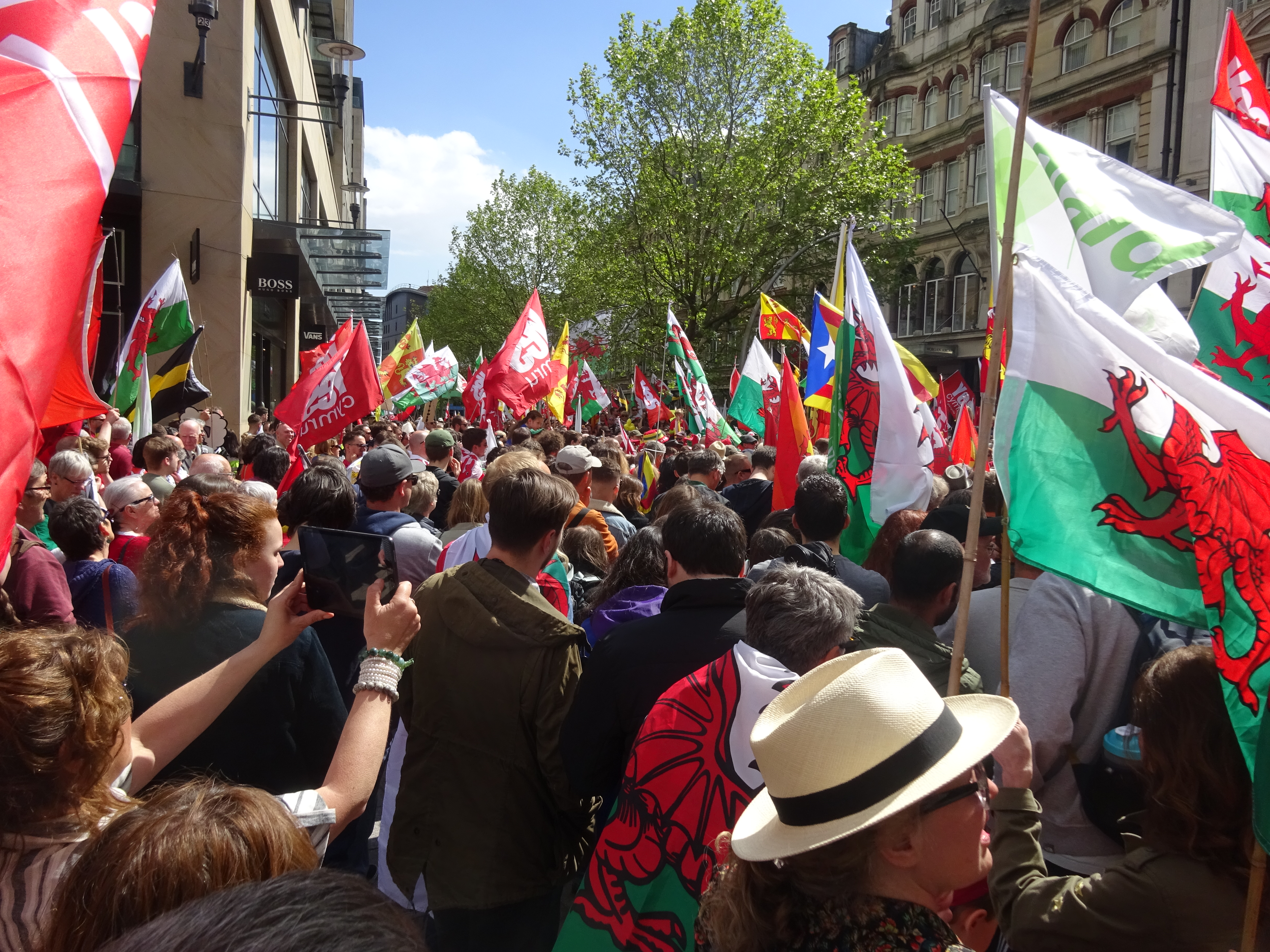
First AUOB Cymru procession in Cardiff, 2019.

All Under One Banner Cymru (AUOB Cymru; Welsh: Pawb Dan Un Faner Cymru) is a Welsh grassroots movement which organises Welsh independence marches.

== Activity ==
=== Founding ===
The organisation was set up as a similar organisation and inspired by All Under One Banner in Scotland.

=== Marches ===
Their first ever march was held in Cardiff on 11 May 2019, with one marcher estimating over 2,000 participants. Attendance grew in later marches in the same year with Caernarfon drawing over 5,000 people according to police, and over 8,000 people according to organisers. Organisers estimated over 5,000 people attended a march in Merthyr Tydfil in September.

Subsequent marches scheduled for 2020 had to be cancelled due to the COVID-19 pandemic.

AUOB announced they would be organising two independence marches in 2022. The first was held in Wrexham on 2 July drawing around 8,000 attendees according to organiser estimates. Organisers estimated a march in Cardiff on 1 October drew the largest crowd with around 10,000 people. A march in Swansea on 20 May 2023 was led by AUOB and Yes Cymru, attracting almost 7,000 people.

== See also ==
=== Wales ===
- Welsh independence
- Welsh Football Fans for Independence

=== Related movements ===
- Scottish independence
- Yes Scotland
- United Ireland
- Ireland's Future
- English independence
- Potential breakup of the United Kingdom
- List of active separatist movements in Europe
