= New Ireland Commission =

Civic organisation in Northern Ireland

- Formation: 2021
- Founder: SDLP
- Headquarters: 121 Ormeau Road; Belfast; BT7 1SH
- CEO: Conor Houston
- Website: newirelandcommission.com

The New Ireland Commission is an organisation established in 2021 by the Social Democratic and Labour Party that holds discussions with citizens on the possibilities of a United Ireland.

== History ==
The New Ireland Commission was set up by the SDLP as an organisation that aims to present various options for a New Ireland via citizen engagement.

The intention to set up the organisation was announced in July 2020 by the SDLP. In a 2020 submission to University College London's "Working Group on Unification Referendums on the Island of Ireland", the SDLP set out its aims of creating a "New Generation Panel", an "Experts Panel" and a "Reference/Elders Panel".

The organisation was launched in 2021 and since then "a significant volume of engagement through private conversations within communities across Northern Ireland has already taken place". There is a particular focus on private conversations with Unionist communities, "towards building an inclusive new Ireland."

In May 2021, Ireland's Future welcomed the launch of the New Ireland Commission marking "further evidence of how the conversation on a new Ireland is developing and progressing."

The first 32-member panel was assembled by the SDLP in May 2021 including civic, faith, community and business leaders to "fuel public debate and discourse about constitutional change on these islands". SDLP leader Colum Eastwood said that work would be undertaken on public services including health and schools and to propose a new vision for the future of public services.

The Foyle MP said that the combined experience of the New Ireland Commission's Expert Reference Panel is “an unmatched resource that will fuel public debate and discourse about constitutional change on these islands”.In March 2023, the organisation set out 6 core principles "towards building an inclusive new Ireland”. The principles are as follows:

- "Reconciliation as a guiding force
- Embracing our diversity
- No one left behind
- Led by citizens
- Future focused, outward looking"

The organisation's three main objectives include to promote dialogue and relationships within communities at local, regional and national level in order to better understand views of citizens; to analyse the relevant issues and publish papers on these; and to develop conversations with newer generations and develop rights proposals.

SDLP leader Colum Eastwood added that after 18 months of “quiet” discussions with those from a unionist background, now was the appropriate time for a public debate. Eastwood reiterated this whilst giving evidence in a Northern Ireland Affairs Committee meeting in September 2023. The New Ireland Commission panel is said to have held discussions with ethnic minorities, trade unions, political parties and public service leaders on "How to Build an Inclusive New Ireland".

In January 2024, the group planned for a discussion at the Seamus Heaney HomePlace in Bellaghy. There are plans for additional events across Ireland as well as in Britain planned for 2024.

== Panel ==
The following are members of the New Ireland Commission Experts and Reference Panel:

  - Matthew O'Toole
  - Siobhan Fitzpatrick
  - Norman Hamilton
  - Ricky O'Rawe
  - Denis Bradley
  - Catherine Ghent
  - Peter Smyth
  - John Barry
  - John Patrick Clayton
  - Lilian Seenoi Barr
  - Andy Pollack
  - Brian Barrington
  - John Cullinane
  - Conor Houston
  - Brendan McMahon
  - Chris Maccabe
  - Gerry Cosgrove
  - John Coakley
  - Bronagh Scott
  - David Canning
  - Paul Gosling
  - Jude Whyte
  - Breigde Gadd
  - Michael Holywood
  - Damian McAteer
  - Tony Gallagher
  - Annie Hoey
  - Emer Currie
  - Malcolm Byrne
  - Nichola Mallon
  - Claire Hanna
  - Heather Wilson

== See also ==
- Ireland's Future
- Uniting UK
- Scottish independence
- Yes Scotland
- Welsh independence
- YesCymru
