= YesCymru =

Political campaign in Wales

- Formation: 13 September 2014; 20 February 2016 (official launch)
- Founder: Iestyn ap Rhobert; Siôn Jobbins; Hedd Gwynfor
- Purpose: Welsh independence
- Headquarters: Swyddfa 23609, PO Box 92, Cardiff, CF11 1NB, Wales, United Kingdom
- Members: ▼7,000 (2023)
- Chair: Phyl Griffiths
- Website: yes.cymru

YesCymru is a non party-political campaign for an independent Wales. The organisation was formed in summer 2014 and officially launched on 20 February 2016 in Cardiff. In 2022 it became a private company limited by guarantee without share capital.

== History ==
=== Origins ===
YesCymru was set up in the summer of 2014 by several activists including Iestyn ap Rhobert, Siôn Jobbins, Hedd Gwynfor, Branwen Alaw, Leon Noakes and Armon Gwilym who were inspired by campaigners in Scotland in the lead-up to the 2014 Scottish independence referendum. They saw how local pro-independence groups were started across Scotland and were convinced that was the best way forward for Welsh independence as well.

'Wales Supporting YES', a solidarity rally outside the Senedd around the time of the Scottish referendum, drew around 800 people. Further meetings followed at Chapter Arts Centre in Cardiff and later in Carmarthen, where the name "YesCymru" was adopted and other legislation agreed. In 2015, a logo was adopted and membership was opened. The official launch of YesCymru took place at Cardiff's Old Library on 20 February 2016, with former Plaid Cymru chairman John Dixon in attendance.

Iestyn told WalesOnline, "YesCymru is a bottom-up organisation rather than a top-down one. We don't have a lot of policies we expect members to subscribe to. Instead we want to discuss the practicalities of Wales as an independent country – what that would mean." He resigned as chairman in October 2018 after proposed changes to the group's constitution were blocked by members; he was later replaced by Jobbins, who was the chair between 2017 and July 2021, who stepped down over health concerns. When asked by the North Wales Daily Post what the group's policies were, Jobbins said: "YesCymru is a single issue movement. Our two main aims are for international recognition which means a seat for Wales in the United Nations and for Wales to have its own written constitution. We're making the general argument for independence. We are working from all parties and none. We welcome people who have different visions as to what an independent Wales would look like in terms of policies etc." Jobbins added that he would continue to support the organisation and that vice chair Sarah Rees would take over.

Polls in 2014 suggested that support for Welsh independence was around 14% of voters. A poll performed in November 2020 found that when looking at those who would vote, 33% would vote Yes to Welsh independence. January 2021's Welsh Political Barometer poll for ITV Wales and Cardiff University suggested 29% of voters would vote 'Yes' to independence in a referendum. The seven most recent polls have found that when looking at support among voters (by excluding answers of 'don't know') support for Welsh independence is between 29% and 33%.

=== Surge in growth during the COVID-19 pandemic ===
YesCymru's membership and media prominence both increased during the COVID-19 pandemic. It claimed that its membership doubled from 2,500 to 5,000 over just two months in spring 2020. The organisation had a further increase of around 3,000 members over three days in late October 2020; this rise coincided with the Westminster government refusing to furlough Welsh businesses for the 17-day 'firebreak' lockdown in Wales. In January 2021, YesCymru claimed to have more than 17,000 registered members. Jobbins believes that one of the reasons for such a rapid growth is the way the Welsh Government has handled the pandemic. "People have seen that Wales has been able to make its own decision and that it's done so with a relative degree of success," he said. Jobbins also put it down to disillusionment with the Westminster establishment: "The fact that Wales has been subject to a Tory government in Westminster for the past 10 years when it has continuously voted Labour has underpinned some of that frustration". On 9 March 2021, YesCymru announced that it had reached 18,000 members.

According to Owen Worth, Lecturer of International Relations at the University of Limerick, YesCymru was Britain's fastest growing political organisation in 2020.

During a period of increasing support for YesCymru and independence, Sion Jobbins, chair of YesCymru, stated, "After these dark days there is a message of hope – Wales is big enough, rich enough and smart enough to make decisions for ourselves." In September 2021, Jobbins called for YesCymru to prepare for the Welsh independence following a second potential vote in a Proposed second Scottish independence referendum. He added that 'People don't want to be in a UK with no Scotland'.

=== Central committee ===
Jobbins stepped down as the chair on 9 July 2021 citing personal reasons and "because of [his] health". He said that he wasn't trying to make a political point but said that "with this kind of growth, expectations, responsibility, demands for results and the need for structural changes within our organisation have become apparent". Sarah Rees the vice chair became the interim chair.

In summer 2021, six members of the central committee resigned over leadership and direction, in addition to a bitter debate around alleged transphobia in YesCymru. Sarah Rees told the BBC that members needed to be "respectful to everyone's views". Further to this she said "one of the things of being a broad church and a wide spectrum of people across politics is about making sure that you're respectful. And I think that it's important for me in the position that I'm in now as the interim chair to remind everybody that we have to be respectful to everyone's views, and respectful to everyone as human beings."

In August 2021, an emergency meeting was held between the organisation's local groups in order to discuss making constitutional changes to stabilise the organisation. However, during the meeting, an advisory vote of no confidence in the central committee took place. The vote originally proved controversial, with a number of local groups being accused of failing to consult their members before voting against the central committee. In mid-August, all remaining members of the central committee resigned. In a statement, the committee said that "harassment directed towards Central Committee members, that goes far beyond social media posts, has taken an incredible toll on mental wellbeing and can no longer be tolerated." Between then and the extraordinary general meeting (EGM), an independent third party firm of accountants oversaw limited day-to-day operations of the organisation.

In December 2021, YesCymru was due to hold its EGM, however, after the online voting ballots had been sent out, the organisation discovered that its membership database had not been updated in several months and that a significant number of members had seen their membership lapse without being notified or offered renewal. On 11 December, the organisation revealed that its membership was now around 9,000 active members. In response to legal advice, the organisation further announced that it would be delaying voting for the EGM until 15 December, in order to send renewal emails to those whose memberships had lapsed.

In January 2022, the organisation held elections to fill the new National Governing Body (NGB). Only the Mid and West Wales region saw more than three candidates run, as such the candidates for all others were automatically elected. Initially the post of Chair was rotated amongst members of the Board but in March 2022 a permanent new Chair was appointed, Elfed Williams. Later that year, the organisation posted a job advertisement for a paid full-time Chief Executive Officer as part of its move towards professionalisation. In September 2022, for the first time, the organisation announced it would appoint a paid full-time Chief Executive Officer, Gwern Gwynfil Evans, and a new Head of Communications, Campaigns and Membership Carwen Davies.

YesCymru sticker on a lamppost in Penrhyndeudraeth

=== Return to in-person activism ===
On 2 July 2022, YesCymru, along with All Under One Banner Cymru and IndyFest Wrexham, participated in the first in-person protest for Welsh independence since the beginning of the COVID-19 pandemic, in Wrexham. Around 6,000 protestors took part, including a musical performance given by Dafydd Iwan and a pre-recorded speech by Mary Lou McDonald, Irish Leader of the Opposition and Sinn Féin leader.

A further independence march was held in Cardiff on 1 October, where nearly 10,000 people took to the streets of the capital. There were speeches and performances from a number of high-profile Welsh figures including Julian Lewis Jones, who plays Boremund Baratheon in the Game of Thrones prequel House of the Dragon, actor and novelist Ffion Dafis, singer Eädyth Crawford and Irish comedian Tadhg Hickey, as well as the Plaid Cymru peer Dafydd Wigley.

== Positions ==
YesCymru takes no view on membership of the European Union in an independent Wales. Whilst 51.9% of the Welsh electorate voted for Brexit in the 2016 European Union referendum, many members of YesCymru appear to be pro-EU. There is also an age divide with, according to Jobbins, "around 50 per cent" of younger people in support, while "people over 65 are not supportive". He explained that younger people lack an "affinity with Westminster" and have not benefited from a central Government in the way that older generations may have: "If you're 50 years or younger, then Westminster hasn't given you anything. If you [were] born in the 40s or 50s you may well have benefited from social housing, free education, free health, full employment, dole money if you're unemployed in the 70s, or even in the 80s." Marta Bona wrote in Vice that "[a]fter a decade of feeling roundly unrepresented by what they see in Westminster, it's easy to understand why, for so many young Welsh voters, independence might feel like the answer."

With regards to the British monarchy, YesCymru takes no position on whether Charles III would remain head of state in an independent Wales. "Cards on the table, as the saying goes. I am a committed Welsh Republican. I want to see an independent Wales and I want it to be a republic," the group's Director Ethan Jones wrote. "That said, my role is to do my best to represent North Wales members on the National Governing Body of YesCymru. Our membership contains republicans, monarchists, and a segment who don't have a firm view either way. YesCymru reflects this by being committed to entrusting the electorate of a future independent Welsh state with the question."

== Campaigns ==
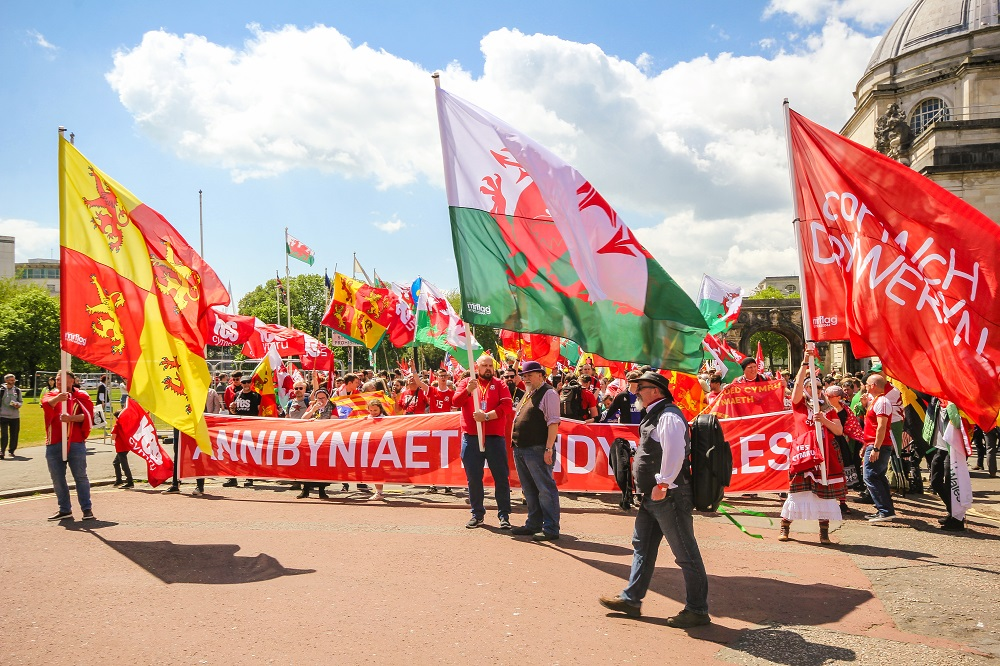
The first Welsh independence march organised by YesCymru and AUOB Cymru, May 2019

In May 2019 the group held the first Welsh independence march in Cardiff, in conjunction with organisers All Under One Banner Cymru. The organisers claimed as many as 3,000 people attended the event and speakers included Plaid Cymru leader Adam Price, performer Carys Eleri, and Ben Gwalchmai of Labour for an independent Wales.

A second march was held in Caernarfon in July 2019, where organisers claimed 10,000 people gathered at Y Maes. Speakers included Dafydd Iwan and Hardeep Singh Kohli.

A third march took place in Merthyr Tydfil in September 2019. Organisers claimed 5,300 attended the rally where speakers included Eddie Butler, Neville Southall, and Kizzy Crawford. Further marches planned for 2020 in Wrexham, Tredegar and Swansea were postponed due to the COVID-19 outbreak.

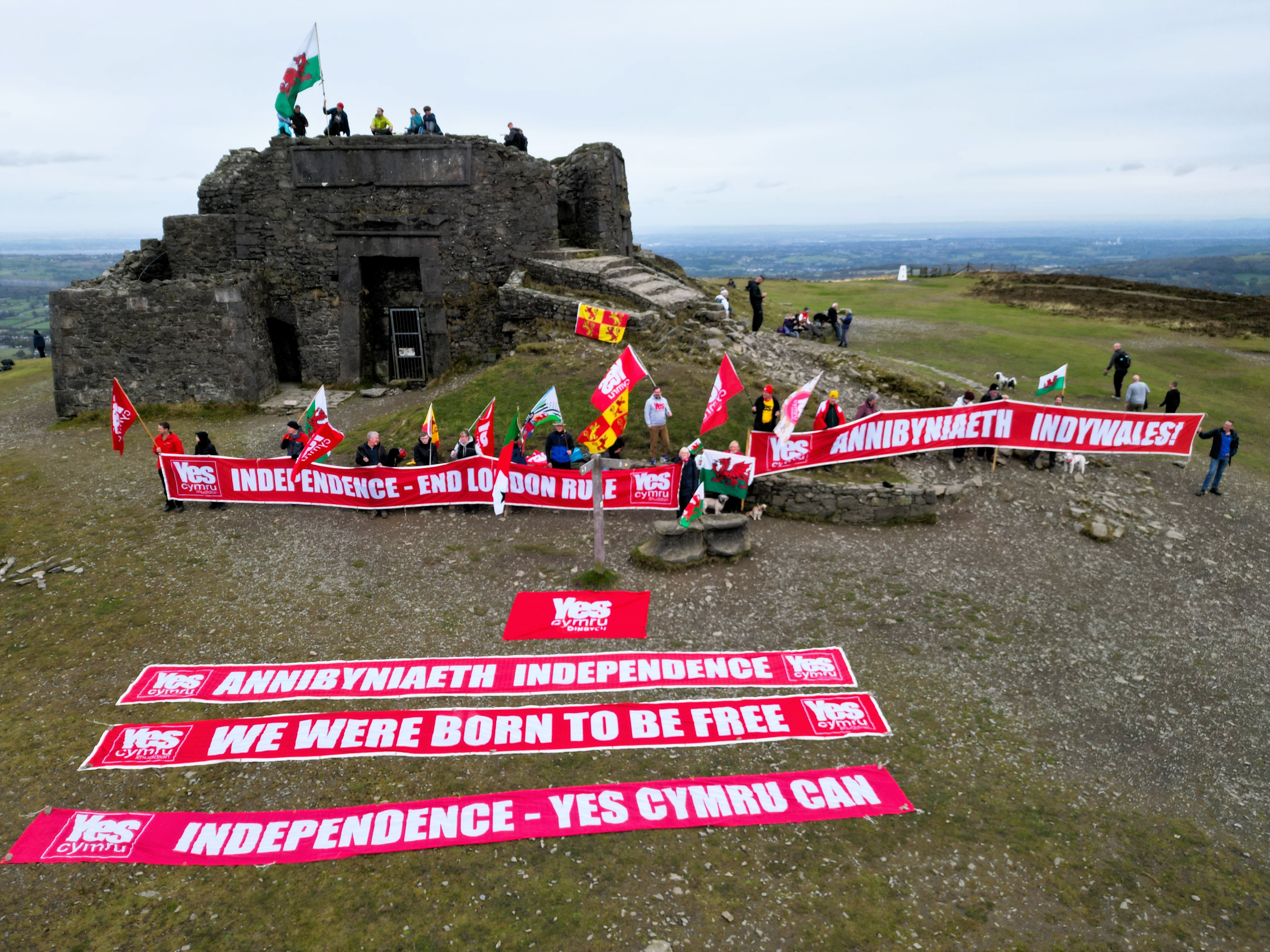
YesCymru demonstration calling for the devolution of the Crown Estate to the Welsh Government on Moel Famau, 13 October 2024

In January 2020, the organisation was in part behind the push to get the song "Yma o Hyd" by Dafydd Iwan and Ar Log to the top of the iTunes Charts.

In March 2021, YesCymru launched Yestival, a year-long programme of discussions on the subject of Welsh independence and their first live campaign since before the pandemic. A spokesperson for YesCymru described Yestival as a "festival of digital engagement with groups representing thousands of existing and non-members" which is specifically designed to "continue shaping plans for a stronger and fairer Wales as an independent, neighbouring nation of the UK." They went on to say, "Wales' growing independence movement has to become a digital uprising."

In March 2021, YesCymru announced they aimed to distribute 400,000 copies of a newspaper around Wales, with the hope of reaching an audience of 1 million people.

2022 saw two further marches, the first in Wrexham attended by around 6,000 people and the second in Cardiff said by the organisers themselves to have been attended by nearly 10,000 people. During 2023 there were another two marches, the first in Swansea on the 20th of May, which was attended by 6,000-7,000 people, this was followed by a march through Bangor on the 23 September of the same year, which was again attended by nearly 10,000 people. There was only a single All Under One Banner Cymru march in 2024, taking place in Carmarthen on the 22 June. Since then, there has been a demonstration in Barry on the 26 April 2025 and one in Rhyl on 18 October of the same year. There was again only a single march in 2026, taking place in Aberystwyth on the 26th of September it saw an attendance of between 8,000 and 9,000.

== Reception ==
=== Support ===
Some supporters of YesCymru are listed below:

- Michael Sheen, actor and producer
- Neville Southall, former international footballer and FWA Footballer of the Year Award winner
- Angharad Mair, television presenter at BBC and S4C
- Gwynoro Jones, former Labour MP
- Delyth Jewell, current Member of the Senedd for South Wales East region
- Mike Jenkins, poet and novelist
- Richard Owain Roberts, author
- Charlotte Church, singer-songwriter, actress and television presenter
- Gruff Rhys, musician, composer, producer, filmmaker and author
- Cian Ciaran, musician best known as a member of the Super Furry Animals
- Matthew Rhys, actor
- Eddie Butler, journalist, broadcaster and ex-rugby union player
- Julian Lewis Jones, actor
- Mike Bubbins, comedian, writer and actor
- Paul Amos, actor and producer
- Kizzy Crawford, musician

=== Criticism ===
Following the central committee controversy in summer 2021, Ifan Morgan Jones argued that YesCymru needed to professionalise, saying that "if the election had been run in a way that encouraged the greatest turnout possible, no one would have credibly been able to complain of entryism or stolen elections" and calling for the organisation to hire full-time administrative staff. Former central committee member Huw Marshall argued that the controversy had arisen "all because a small section on Twitter had taken umbrage that one person had been suspended from the central committee for having questionable views on the trans community" and saying that the organisation had failed to create "a professional structure staffed by competent individuals with the required skills to lead campaigns and make a positive case for Welsh independence." Emrys Price-Jones, the chair of LGBTQ+ YesCymru, has argued that the organisation had refused to "stamp down on transphobic and queerphobic rhetoric," leading to a significant number of queer members quitting the organisation.

Conservative MP David Davies has criticised the organisation for its stickering campaigning, accusing the group of posting stickers illegally "all over signs and buildings in Wales".

== See also ==
=== Wales ===
- All Under One Banner Cymru
- Welsh Football Fans for Independence

=== Related movements ===
- Scottish independence
- Yes Scotland
- United Ireland
- Ireland's Future
- English independence
- Potential breakup of the United Kingdom
- List of active separatist movements in Europe
