= Kizzy Crawford =

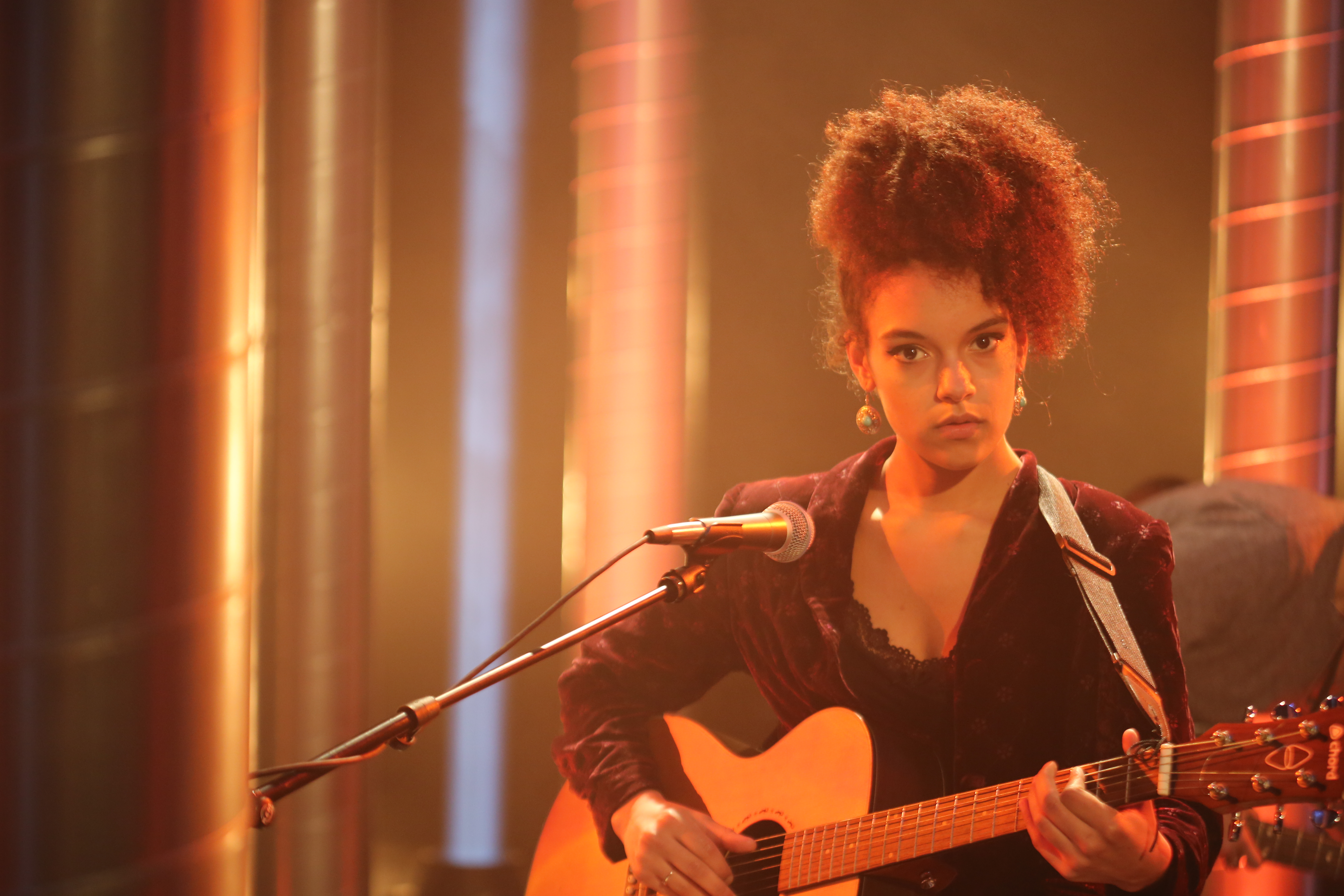
- Crawford performing on Ochr 1's Antena programme in 2016

Background information
- Also known as: Kizzy
- Born: Oxford, England
- Origin: Wales
- Genres: Folk, soul, pop, indie, jazz
- Occupations: Musician, singer, songwriter, producer.
- Instruments: Guitar, bass, violin, vocals
- Years active: 2012–present
- Website: www.kizzycrawford.com

Kezia Lily Rose "Kizzy" Crawford-Southgate, sometimes shortened to Kizzy, (Oxford, 1996) is a Welsh singer songwriter of Bajan heritage who sings in both English and Welsh, using traditional and modern sources. She began writing songs at the age of thirteen.

== Background ==
Kizzy was born in Oxford, but when her parents divorced in 1999, moved with her mother, sister (Eady) and grandparents to Aberaeron and later Llandeilo before settling in Merthyr Tydfil. Her mother is from the south-east of England but she spent her childhood holidays with her grandparents in Disserth, Powys and always wanted to raise her children in Wales.

Her father's family is from Barbados.

She was educated in Welsh from the age of four and is the eldest of five children. She has a sister, Eädyth, who is also a singer.

At the age of 26 she was diagnosed with autism.

== Career ==
Crawford won the Arts Connect Original Singer-Songwriter prize in 2012 resulting in work with Amy Wadge including recording her first single Starling and its video with Arts Connect's Sonig - youth music industry initiative.

She performed her song "The Starling" live on BBC Radio Wales's Bethan Elfyn Show in August 2013. This was then released as her debut single in November 2013 followed by her EP Temporary Zone in December, released by Cardiff record label See Monkey Do Monkey. Together with many radio and TV appearances in Wales during 2013, she has also performed live at various venues including FOCUS Wales Festival, the Sŵn festival, the Green Man Festival, Caerphilly Castle and Maes B at the National Eisteddfod of Wales. Crawford also performed at Festival No 6.

Crawford appeared on the BBC Wales Six Nations Championship 2014 promotions singing "Calon Lân", and in April 2014 was named as one of twelve BBC Horizons acts for 2014–15.

She performed her single "Golden Brown", and also "Calon Lân", live on BBC Radio 4's Saturday Live programme on 20 September 2014. Later that year she performed at Glastonbury on the BBC Introducing stage and has since performed at several other festivals including WOMEX Blissfields, Hay Festival and Cheltenham Jazz Festival.

In 2015, she released the single "Shout Out / Yr Alwad", a co-write with Owen Powell; the track was selected as the soundtrack to the Visit Wales 2015 National TV & Online Campaign.

Crawford performed at the Euro 16 Welsh team homecoming gig at Cardiff City Stadium alongside the Manic Street Preachers.

In 2016, several of her compositions were selected as part of the WJEC A Level Music Syllabus. Later Crawford was invited to perform and discuss that live on Woman's Hour for BBC Radio 4.

Later in 2016, Crawford collaborated with jazz pianist and composer Gwilym Simcock on Birdsong - Can Yr Adar, based on the Welsh rainforest in Carngafallt. They co-wrote new music and performed and toured it live with Sinfonia Cymru across Wales, ending in a performance at London Jazz Festival. In 2018, the Birdsong-Can Yr Adar CD was released via Basho Records to coincide with a second UK tour. The recording was listed as a Top 100 2018 album by jazz journalist Ted Gioia.

In 2017, she performed with BBC National Orchestra of Wales and at Cambridge Folk Festival. She played a supporting role as PC Emma Jones in the BBC drama Keeping Faith.

In 2018, Crawford signed to Freestyle Records, and then released the album The Way I Dream in 2019.

In November 2021, Crawford released her first self-recorded/produced/mixed and debut Welsh Album Rhydd with Sain Records.

== Politics ==
In September 2019, Crawford sang Calon Lân with her sister Eädyth at a YesCymru rally in Merthyr Tydfil expressing her support for Welsh independence.

== Discography ==
- The Starling (Soig, 2013)
- Temporary Zone (See Monkey Do Monkey, 2013)
- Golden Brown (2014)
- Shout Out / Yr Alwad (2015)
- Pili Pala (2015)
- Imago (2015)
- Birdsong / Can Yr Adar (Basho Records, 2018)
- The Way I Dream (Freestyle Records, 2019)
- Rhydd (Sain Records, 2021)
