= Eddie Butler (rugby union) =

Welsh rugby union player, journalist and sports commentator (1957–2022)

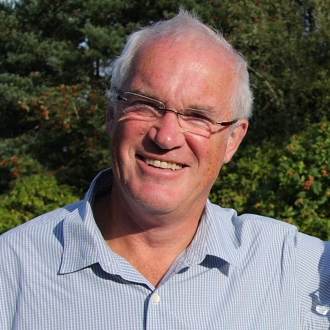
- Butler in 2010
- Born: Edward Thomas Butler; 8 May 1957 Newport, Wales
- Died: 15 September 2022 (aged 65) Cusco, Peru

Rugby union career
- Position: Number eight
Amateur team(s)
Years	Team	Apps	(Points)
1976–1990	Pontypool RFC	245	(240)
1980-1982	Barbarians RFC	5	(0)
- Correct as of 13 September 2008
International career
Years	Team	Apps	(Points)
1980–1985	Wales	16	(8)
1983	British Lions		
- Correct as of 14 September 2008

Edward Thomas Butler (8 May 1957 – 15 September 2022) was a Welsh rugby union player, journalist and sports commentator.

== Early life and rugby career ==
Butler was born on 8 May 1957. He was educated at Monmouth School and Fitzwilliam College, Cambridge, where he studied French and Spanish between 1976 and 1978. Butler played as a number eight and gained Cambridge Blues in 1976, 1977 and 1978, Butler played in 16 matches for the Welsh national side between 1980 and 1984 and captained the side in six of those matches.

He captained Pontypool RFC side between 1982 and 1985, in succession to Jeff Squire. He made his club debut against Pontypool Junior Union on 1 September 1976 and scored 60 tries in 245 appearances. He was chosen for the Barbarians and the British Lions, touring with the latter in 1983. Butler retired from international rugby in 1985.

== Journalist and broadcaster ==
Whilst continuing to play for Pontypool Butler became a teacher at Cheltenham College. He joined BBC Radio Wales as a press and publicity officer in 1984 and later worked for a property developer. Butler entered journalism in 1988, writing for the Sunday Correspondent.

Butler wrote a weekly column in the Rugby Union section of The Observer Sport since 1991 and also wrote for The Guardian, as well as commentating for the BBC with Brian Moore, the former England hooker. Butler had first commentated alongside veteran Bill McLaren and after McLaren's retirement Butler became the BBC's lead Rugby Union commentator.

He received some attention when it became public knowledge that Austin Healey's newspaper column had been written by Butler whilst Healey was on tour with the British and Irish Lions Rugby squad in Australia in 2001.

Before commentating on a match, Butler prepared for several hours, absorbing as much information as he could, but taking few notes, and likened it to cramming for an examination. He described writing a match report, often under time pressure, as telling a story which does not necessarily have to follow the timeline of the match so long as it is entertaining and complete.

In 2008 Butler provided commentary for archery at the Beijing Olympics.

Butler presented the history series: Wales and the History of the World (BBC1 Wales), Hidden Histories (BBC2), Welsh Towns at War (BBC1) in 2014 and two series of Welsh Towns (BBC2 Wales) in 2015. He was on the commentating team for the Invictus Games. He also worked on association football assignments, including a special interview with Eric Cantona for an FA Cup Final edition of Grandstand in 1994.

== Writing, charity work and politics ==
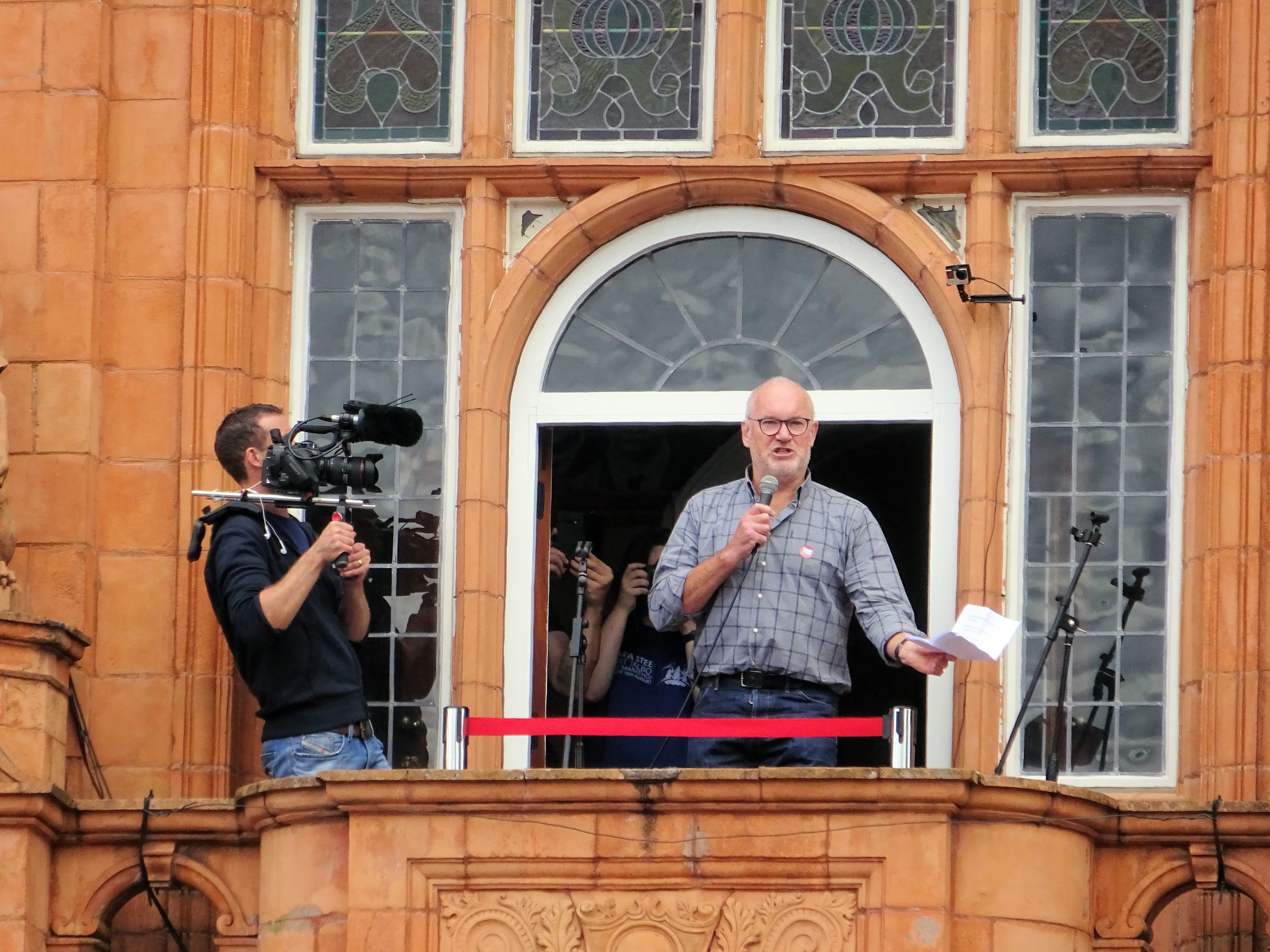
Eddie Butler at the joint YesCymru AUOB Cymru march for Welsh Independence in Merthyr Tydfil on 7 September 2019

Butler published several novels, including two based on rugby. He was also an ambassador for Prostate Cymru, a Welsh organisation to raise prostate cancer awareness.

Butler was a supporter of Welsh independence and spoke at a pro independence march in Merthyr Tydfil organised by YesCymru and AUOB Cymru on 7 September 2019.

== Personal life and death ==
Butler was married to Susan at the time of his death and had six children.

Butler actively joined fundraising efforts for both Prostate Cymru and the Velindre Cancer Centre. On 15 September 2022, whilst taking part with 25 other Prostate Cymru charity walkers, including his daughter Nell, on the Inca Trail Trek to Machu Picchu, Peru, Butler died peacefully in his sleep at Ecoinka base camp near Cusco in the Andes. He was 65.

== Books ==
- Butler, E. The Greatest Welsh XV Ever. Gomer Press. 2011. ISBN 978-1848514089. (Non-fiction)
- Butler, E. The Head of Gonzo Davies. Gomer Press. 2014. ISBN 978-1848518735. (Fiction)
- Butler, E. Gonzo Davies Caught in Possession. Gomer Press. 2015. ISBN 978-1785620324. (Fiction, sequel)
- Butler, E. The Asparagus Thieves. Gomer Press. 2017. ISBN 978-1-78562-222-9. (Fiction)
