= Separatism in the United Kingdom =

Major and minor separatist movements in the United Kingdom. Scotland (incl. Orkney and Shetland) for Scottish independence Orkney and Shetland, for independence for either or both of them. Northern Ireland Irish reunification (with Republic of Ireland) Ulster independence Wales, for Welsh independence Cornwall (in England), for Cornish independence England, for either English independence, or localised movements Northern England, Yorkshire, Northumbria, Midlands, Mercia, London, and Wessex, in various lighter overlapping shades of red.

Separatism in the United Kingdom may refer to the secession of any of the countries of the United Kingdom (England, Scotland, Northern Ireland and Wales) from the union. Less significant movements for separatism exist such as Cornwall within England.

The main separatist movements of the countries of the United Kingdom may be described collectively to possibly lead to the breakup of the United Kingdom, in relation to the impact a successful movement may have on the other movements.

Since May 2026, the governments of Scotland, Northern Ireland and Wales are led by separatist parties, with the main separatist party being the largest party in each of the three devolved legislatures.

== Major movements ==
=== England ===
England (dark red) within the United Kingdom

On the political level, some English nationalists have advocated self-government for England. This could take the form either of a devolved English Parliament within the United Kingdom or the re-establishment of an independent sovereign state of England outside the UK.

The English Democrats are an English nationalist political party that call for the creation of a devolved English Parliament within a federal UK.

=== Scotland ===
Scotland (dark blue) within the United Kingdom

Scottish independence is supported most prominently by the Scottish National Party, but other parties also support independence. Other pro-independence parties which have held representation in the Scottish Parliament include the Scottish Green Party, the Scottish Socialist Party and Solidarity. At the 2016 Scottish Parliament election, 69 of the 129 seats available were won by pro-independence parties (63 SNP and 6 Greens). The independence movement consists of many factions with varying political views. The SNP wants Scotland to keep the monarchy (see personal union) and become an independent Commonwealth realm, similar to Canada or Australia. Others—such as the SSP and Solidarity—want Scotland to become an independent republic. The SSP has led republican protests and authored the Declaration of Calton Hill, calling for an independent republic.

Since the 2007 Scottish Parliament election, (being continuously re-elected, including as recently as 2026) the Scottish National Party have held the most seats in the Scottish Parliament and have formed governments.

=== Northern Ireland with Ireland ===
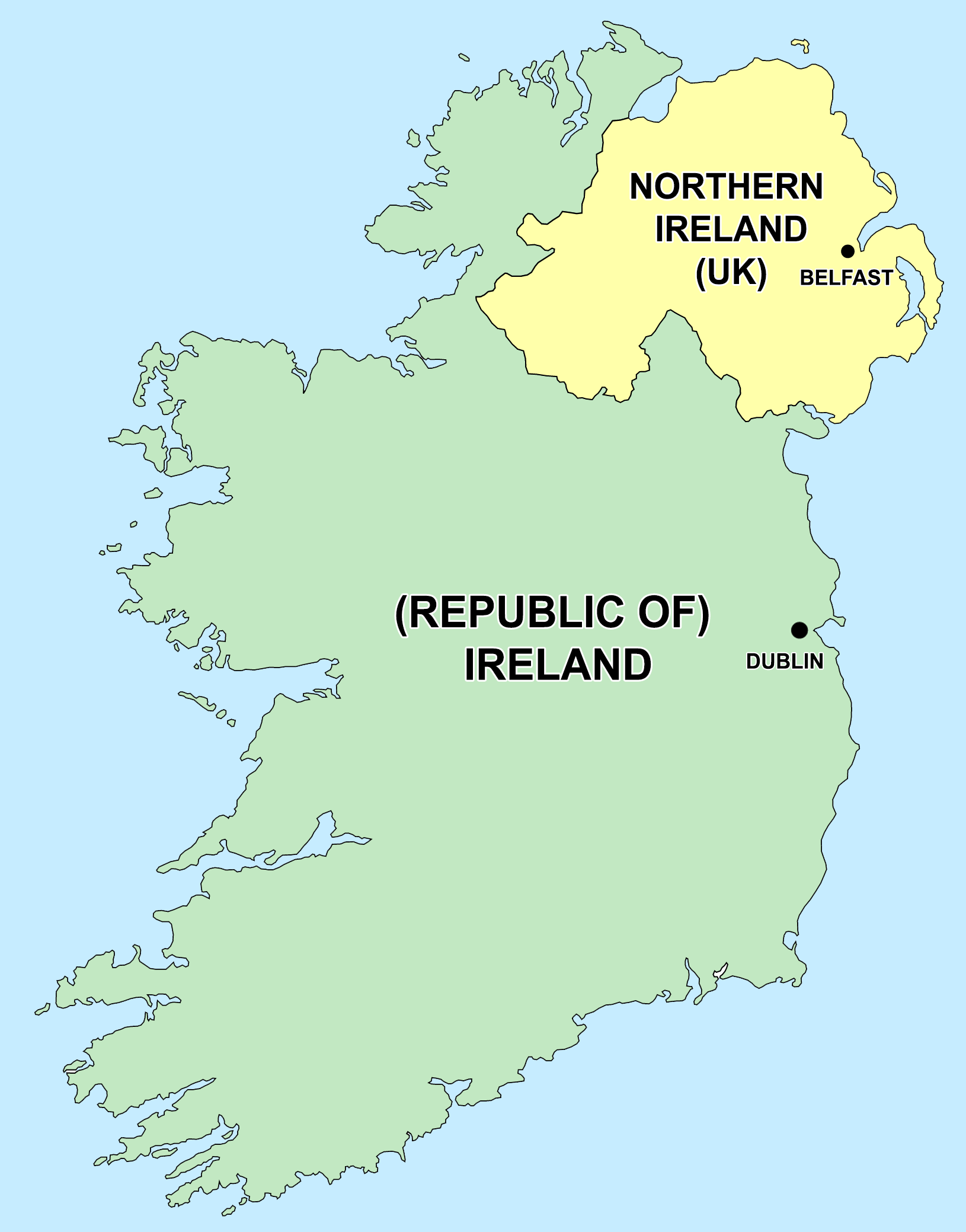
Present day political map of Ireland

Northern Ireland is part of the United Kingdom but has a substantial nationalist population who would prefer to be part of a united Ireland. In Northern Ireland, the term "nationalist" is used to refer to those who seek Irish reunion by constitutional means. A more militant strand of nationalism, traditionally associated with the Sinn Féin party, is generally described as "republican" and was regarded as somewhat distinct, although the modern-day party declares itself to be a constitutional party committed to exclusively peaceful and democratic means. The opposite of Irish nationalism is Ulster unionism, which seeks to maintain the union with the United Kingdom, again by constitutional means. The more militant strand of Unionism is called Loyalism.

The majority of Northern Ireland, like Scotland, voted to Remain in the EU Referendum. A factor in this vote was the fear of a disruptive hard border between Northern Ireland and the Republic of Ireland, as well as fears that such a border might lead to the collapse of the Good Friday Agreement (Belfast Agreement). Unionist (and particularly Loyalist) discontent with the Northern Ireland Protocol (a protocol to the Brexit withdrawal agreement) and the consequent Irish Sea border it has entailed, has also threatened the stability of the Agreement.

Sinn Féin have held the most seats in the Northern Ireland Assembly since the 2022 Northern Ireland Assembly election, and their leader, Michelle O'Neill, has co-lead the Northern Ireland Executive as its first minister. Since the 2024 general election, Sinn Féin have also held more Westminster constituencies than any other Northern Irish party.

=== Wales ===
Wales (dark green) within the United Kingdom

Welsh independence (Welsh: Annibyniaeth i Gymru) is a political ideal advocated by some political parties, advocacy groups, and people in Wales that would see Wales secede from the United Kingdom and become an independent sovereign state. This ideology is promoted mainly by the Welsh nationalist party, Plaid Cymru, and the non-partisan YesCymru campaign.

Since the 2026 Senedd election, Plaid Cymru have held the most seats in the Senedd, with their leader being first minister who leads the Welsh Government.

The Wales Green Party also supports Welsh independence and gained representation in the Senedd for the first time in the 2026 Senedd election, gaining 2 seats.

== Minor movements ==
=== Cornwall ===
Cornwall (orange) within England and the United Kingdom (both lighter shades of orange)

The Celtic League and Celtic Congress have a Cornish branch and recognise Cornwall as a Celtic Nation alongside the Isle of Man, Ireland, Scotland, Wales and Brittany. The league is a political pressure group that campaigns for independence and Celtic cooperation. Mebyon Kernow is a regional party in Cornwall that promotes Cornish nationalism.

=== Independent Northern Ireland ===
Map of Northern Ireland (dark yellow) within the United Kingdom

Independence (separate from the Republic of Ireland) is a fringe view in Northern Ireland, but has been supported by groups such as Ulster Third Way and some factions of the Ulster Defence Association. However, it has not been supported by any of the political parties represented in the Northern Ireland Assembly, by the government of the United Kingdom, or by the government of the Republic of Ireland.

=== London ===
Map of Greater London within England

London independence, sometimes shortened to Londependence, refers to a belief favouring full-fledged independence for London as a city-state, separate from the United Kingdom.

=== North of England ===
Map of Northern England (red) within England

"Northern Independence" refers to a belief favouring independence for the North of England. The North–South divide is of significant political and cultural importance in England.

=== Orkney and Shetland ===
Map of the Orkney Islands within Scotland

In July 2023, Orkney Council announced they were to look in alternative constitutional arrangements including changing its status within the UK or leaving the UK to become associated with Norway. The islands were previously under Norwegian/Danish control, having been given to Scotland in 1472 as a royal dowry.

A movement called Wir Shetland was launched in October 2015 to secede from the rest of Scotland in favour of becoming either a Crown Dependency or a British Overseas Territory, as a means of achieving greater autonomy for the Shetland Isles.

In September 2020 the Shetland Islands Council voted in favour of exploring options for "financial and political self-determination", stating that the islands' reliance on Scotland was "seriously threatening the prosperity, and even basic sustainability, of Shetland as a community."

=== Other parts of England ===
Yorkshire, Mercia (the Midlands), Wessex (southernmost England) and Northumbria (centred on North East England) are other areas considered in media as potential areas for separation prior to the 2014 Scottish independence referendum.

The village of Piddington, Oxfordshire in a referendum, voted in favour of leaving the United Kingdom in September 2026.

== Collective context ==
The separatist movements of the countries of the United Kingdom (excluding England), have been said to have increased as a result of Brexit. Media outlets and individuals have described this as leading to "break-up of the United Kingdom", "End of the UK", or a "Disunited Kingdom".

Media outlets such as NBC News have said that Scotland is the most likely to leave, followed by a United Ireland, then Wales (the latter two being catalysed by the independence of others). In March 2021, a poll found that 44% of people in Northern Ireland thought Scottish independence would make a referendum on a United Ireland more likely.

Following the success of Plaid Cymru in the 2026 Senedd election, Scotland, Wales, and Northern Ireland were all under the control of pro-independence parties simultaneously, for the first time. Following this, in September 2026, the leaders of the Scottish Nationalist Party, Plaid Cymru, and Sinn Fein signed a memorandum of understanding regarding independence referendums. The goal of the memorandum was to force Andy Burnham to allow each country to hold a referendum. The memorandum stated that "No Westminster government has the right to block democracy or undermine the principle that our people will decide their own future." John Swinney and Michelle O'Neill both called for immediate independence referendums in Scotland and Northern Ireland. However, a Welsh independence referendum before the 2030 Senedd election has been ruled out.
