= Welsh Football Fans for Independence =

Welsh pro-independence group

- Formation: 2018
- Purpose: Welsh independence
- Website: https://indywalesfans.cymru/

Welsh Football Fans for Independence are a non-partisan group of association football fans campaigning for Welsh independence.

== History ==
The group organised its first march for an international game against the Danish men's national team in November 2018, with around 100 people attending. The marches had grown to a size of several hundred by the start of the Welsh men's national team's qualification campaign for the UEFA Men's Euros 2020.

The group has cooperated with other Welsh independence groups and with independence groups in Scotland.

== See also ==
- Football in Wales
- Welsh Language Society
- YesCymru
