= Arts Connect =

Arts Connect (Clymu Celf in Welsh) is a local authority arts services partnership between Rhondda Cynon Taf, Merthyr Tydfil, Bridgend and Vale of Glamorgan in South Wales since 2012. It is advised by the Arts Council of Wales, and the Welsh Assembly Government.
