= Ireland's Future =

Irish pressure group

- Todhchaí na hÉireann
- Formation: 2017
- Headquarters: Dublin, Ireland
- Key people: Senator Frances Black (Chairperson); Niall Murphy (Secretary); Gerry Carlile (CEO)
- Website: www.irelandsfuture.com

Ireland's Future is a civic nationalist Irish non-profit company formed in 2017 to campaign for new constitutional arrangements on the island of Ireland.

== History ==
As part of its campaigning, Ireland's Future wrote a series of open letters to the Taoiseach and the Irish government that were signed by well-recognized people across Irish society calling for a dialogue on the constitutional future of the island of Ireland. open letters were released on the 8 December 2017, 2 February 2018, 2 November 2018 and 1 November 2019. The signatories of these letters included Marty Walsh, David McWilliams, Fintan O'Toole, James McClean, Adrian Dunbar, Michael Conlan, Christy Moore and Mary Black.

In 2019, Ireland's Future staged an event attended by 1,500 people in Belfast which was widely covered in the media and was entitled 'Beyond Brexit'. This examined the future of Northern Ireland and the Republic after the UK leaves the EU and was attended by the Irish Government as well as leading political members of the Northern Irish assembly.

In November 2020, Ireland's Future has called on the Irish Taoiseach, Micheál Martin to plan and prepare for Irish unity as they believe that Brexit has brought the prospect of Irish unity sharply into focus in current years.

In December 2020, Ireland's Future held an online webcast with congressman Richard Neal who is chairman of the House Ways and Means Committee which has jurisdiction over all taxation, tariffs and trade deals in the US. This was to discuss his Irish roots and his wanting to see Irish unity in his lifetime.

In January 2021, Senator Frances Black who is chairperson of Ireland's Future put the case forward for unification on Irish national broadcaster named Newstalk where she states that the Irish government should start the debate and begin to put in plans for a border poll. In the same month Professor Colin Harvey of Ireland’s Future also received a reply from the Secretary of State for Northern Ireland Brandon Lewis to a request asking him to outline who he would consult, what plans he would make and what role the Irish Government would have in a future Border poll.

In February 2021, Ireland's Future Secretary Niall Murphy discussed the need to prepare for a future referendum so as to avoid the lack of preparation that Brexit had.

Ireland's Future has produced a document titled "Advancing The Conversation" calling on the Irish government to arrange citizens’ assemblies, as it did before gay marriage and abortion.

On 1 October 2022, Ireland's Future held an event in Dublin which included speakers talking about the prospect of uniting Ireland. Speakers included Leo Varadkar and Mary Lou McDonald. Actor Colm Meaney and the musicians Donal Lunny and Denise Chaila were also in attendance.

== See also ==
- United Ireland
- New Ireland Commission
- Uniting UK
- Scottish independence
- Yes Scotland
- Welsh independence
- YesCymru
