= Eädyth Crawford =

Bilingual Welsh-language singer

- Born: Oxford, UK
- Occupation: singer-songwriter
- Relatives: Kizzy Crawford
- Musical career
- Genre: electro-soul
- Award: Triskel Award
- Website: www.eadyth.com

Eady Crawford, who performs under the name Eädyth, is a Welsh singer-songwriter performing bilingual electro-soul music.

== Early life ==
Eady Crawford was born in Oxford. She moved to Wales as a baby and attended a Welsh-language school.

== Career ==
Eady Crawford performs as a bilingual electro'n'b and electro-soul artist under the name Eädyth. She was part of the BBC Horizons and Forté Project talent development schemes, and has been played on BBC Wales and BBC Radio Cymru. She works at her home studio.

She also performs as a duo with vocalist and theatre director Izzy Rabey, and often alongside guitarist Rhodri Foxhall. Crawford, Rabey and Foxhall have headlined the National Eisteddfod, The Moon in Cardiff, Cwrw in Carmarthen, and Porter's in Cardiff.

In early August 2020, Eädyth Crawford released a single with an English and a Welsh version called, respectively, Grow or Tyfu, and was played on KISS FM and BBC Radio 1. She worked with Cardiff-based Ladies of Rage on an all-black-female album called Harddwch Du, and also released an EP called Mas o Ma with Izzy Rabey. At the end of 2020, she received the Triskel Award for an emerging artist at the Welsh Music Prize.

In 2021, she released the single Inhale & Exhale on the Cardiff-based label Libertino Records. It was a response to the COVID-19 lockdown. Later that year, she performed at the Storfa’r Steddfod venue at the National Eisteddfod.

In 2022, Eädyth played her first headline show: at Porter's in Cardiff. Shortly afterwards, she performed at Tiny Rebel Cardiff as part of the Sŵn Festival.

In 2022, Crawford was also working as a composer for a production of A Midsummer Night’s Dream in the Sherman Theatre. She also produced music for theatre productions of Merthyr Stigmatist and Imrie at the Sherman Theatre.

In 2023, she released a single called All These Dreams about the contemporary realities of living with HIV.

== Political views ==
Crawford supports Welsh independence and was part of the Welsh independence march in Merthyr 2019. In 2025, she gave a speech at the March for Independence in Barry.

In 2023, Eädyth Crawford, who was part of a bilingual singer-songwriter duo with Izzy Rabey, refused to perform at the National Eisteddfod after being told to translate their English lyrics into Welsh.

== Personal life ==
Crawford is based in the valley of Merthyr Tydfil.
