= Uniting UK =

Unionist campaign in Northern Ireland

- Formation: December 19, 2020; 5 years ago
- Location: Northern Ireland, UK
- Key people: Philip Smith; John Hanna; Trevor Ringland
- Website: unitinguk.com

Uniting UK is a unionist campaign in Northern Ireland, campaigning for a more united Northern Ireland in a more united UK.

== Background ==
The campaign was founded in 2020 by Philip Smith and John Hanna. The campaign launched in December 2020. In February 2024, Trevor Ringland joined the campaign team.

== Campaigning ==
The campaign has been the subject of a BBC Radio 4 programme, taken part in a debate hosted by Féile an Phobail, presented at conferences, ran town hall meetings, and contributed to newspaper articles from Japan's Chunichi Shimbun to the UK's Financial Times. Media outlets continue to seek the campaign's perspective as a counterpoint to that of the nationalist and separatist campaign Ireland's Future.

Writing in the Irish Times, Emma DeSouza assessed the campaign's approach:

"The pro-union group makes the case for Northern Ireland as an integral component of the United Kingdom and does so with slick graphics and refreshing honesty. Unafraid to acknowledge the failures associated with unionism, and with a clear aim of appealing to the growing middle ground, the fledgling group is effective in its efforts, and a welcome addition to Northern Ireland’s political landscape."

The group have two active programmes. The Young Leaders programme is for young people in Northern Ireland and the Beldon Fellowship is for young professionals from Northern Ireland who work in national roles across the UK.

In January 2024, the campaign published their 2024-29 corporate strategy.

== Policy ==
The campaign holds that Northern Ireland is economically, socially, and politically better off in the UK. Uniting UK seek to celebrate the diversity of Northern Ireland and the diversity of the United Kingdom.

Since 12 July 2024, the campaign have been calling for "unionist realignment". Unionist realignment is the name given to making changes to unionist political parties, from cross-party structures to coordination during elections.

== Engagement ==
The campaign launched a consultation called Vision2031 on 3 May 2021, the 100th anniversary of the creation of Northern Ireland. The campaign's research from the consultation was featured in the News Letter.

On 12 July 2025, the campaign launched the Grassroots Survey. The anonymous survey, developed by independent pollsters, is designed to give grassroots unionism a say in the future of political unionism. Results will be shared with unionist party leaders. The survey also gauges unionist views on "unionist realignment".

== Impact ==
The campaign was the first to use the "a Union of people" slogan, which the Ulster Unionist Party later used as a slogan under the leadership of Doug Beattie and Mike Nesbitt.
