= English independence =

Political movement in the United Kingdom

England (red) within the United Kingdom (pink) along with Republic of Ireland and Isle of Man

English independence is a political stance advocating secession of England from the United Kingdom. Support for secession of England (the UK's largest and most populated country) has been influenced by the increasing devolution of political powers to Scotland, Wales and Northern Ireland, where independence from the United Kingdom (and in the case of Northern Ireland, reunification with the rest of Ireland) unlike England is a prominent subject of political debate.

English independence has been seen by its advocates as a way to resolve the West Lothian question in British politics: Scottish, Welsh and Northern Irish MPs in the Parliament of the United Kingdom at Westminster being able to vote on matters affecting England, but English MPs not having the same power over equivalent issues in Scotland, Wales and Northern Ireland, as these powers are devolved to the Scottish Parliament, the Northern Ireland Assembly or the Senedd (Welsh Parliament).

While some minor political parties have campaigned for English independence, all major UK-wide political parties adhere to the conventional view of British unionism, and oppose changing the constitutional status of England. Scottish demands for independence, rather than English demands, are seen as the most pressing threat to British unity; Scotland voted against independence at the referendum on 18 September 2014, but the topic is still being debated. The inclusion of Northern Ireland in the UK is an equally controversial topic, whilst Welsh independence has also grown in support in recent years.

== Historical context ==
=== Kingdom of England ===
The English national identity developed over a long period of time. In the wake of the breakdown of Roman rule in Britain from the middle of the fourth century, present day England was progressively settled by Germanic groups. Collectively known as Anglo-Saxons, these were Angles and Saxons from what is now the Danish/German border area and Jutes from the Jutland peninsula. The Kingdom of England came into being in the 10th century: it spanned much of the southern two-thirds of Great Britain and a number of smaller outlying islands. The Norman conquest of Wales from 1067 to 1283 (formalised by the Statute of Rhuddlan in 1284) placed Wales under English control, and Wales came under English law with the Laws in Wales Acts 1535–1542, which disestablished the Principality of Wales.

=== Formation of the UK ===
In 1603, the Union of the Crowns took place when the death of Elizabeth I resulted in James VI, King of Scots, acceding to the English throne, placing England and Scotland under personal union. In 1707, the Acts of Union were passed by both the Parliament of England and the Parliament of Scotland, forming the Kingdom of Great Britain. The measure was deeply unpopular in both Scotland and England. The Scottish signatories to the Act were forced to sign the documents in secrecy because of mass rioting and unrest in the Scottish capital, Edinburgh. Scotland did however retain Scots law, a legal system distinct from that used in England and Wales.

In 1800, the Kingdom of Great Britain and the Kingdom of Ireland both passed new Acts of Union, creating the United Kingdom of Great Britain and Ireland, which came into being in 1801. In 1921, the Anglo-Irish Treaty was agreed, allowing Southern Ireland under the Irish Free State to become a Dominion, resulting in only Northern Ireland remaining within the UK, which in 1927 was formally renamed the United Kingdom of Great Britain and Northern Ireland.

== English independence movement ==
=== Parliament motion ===
In 2006 a motion was tabled in the UK parliament advocating for English independence, signed by four Members: Peter Atkinson of the Conservative Party, Angus MacNeil of the Scottish National Party and Bill Etherington and Elliot Morley of Labour. Mike Wood, then Labour MP for Batley and Spen, withdrew his support. The signatories cited an ICM poll showing a majority in England (as well as Scotland) for English independence.

=== English identity ===
The 2021 census found that only 15.3% of people living in England declared themselves as "English", a significant decrease from 60.4% in 2011. 56.8% declared themselves as "British" only in 2021. 14.3% declared themselves as "English and British", an increase from 9.1% in 2011.

=== English independence support ===
In 2015, following the Scottish independence referendum, journalist Leo McKinstry proposed a referendum on English independence, also stating that English patriotism is as valid as Scottish patriotism and that the people of England have as much a right as Scottish people to hold a referendum on English independence.

In 2017, over 4,000 people signed a petition supporting independence for England.

In 2020, a poll by Panelbase showed that 49% of English voters supported English independence, excluding "don't knows". 34% were in favour of English independence, 36% against and 30% didn't know.

In August 2022, the English Constitution Party announced an independence rally in York. "We advocate for the voiding, not repeal but the voiding, of the Act of Union," Moore told The National. "That means that Scotland has complete control over its own nation, and England, we advocate, has an English parliament."

== Arguments for English independence ==
=== Economy ===
There are questions over the currency of an independent England and whether it would use the Pound sterling. Uncertainty could be brought in the immediate aftermath of independence and the unlikelihood of the Bank of England accepting a currency union with an independent England. Advocates of English sovereignty claim that a sovereign England would enjoy one of the world's strongest economies, with an estimated GDP of US$2.865 trillion as of 2015, making it the world's 5th, 6th, or 7th largest economy depending on measurement. It is also claimed that England would be the 15th wealthiest nation in the world, with a GDP per capita of US$33,999 in 2015. The equivalent figures are $30,783 for Scotland, $23,397 for Wales, and $24,154 for Northern Ireland, or $27,659 for the UK minus England.

=== Education ===
Following independence, England would possess a higher education system that includes universities that rank highly in world rankings, with the University of Oxford, the University of Cambridge and colleges of the University of London regularly featuring among the top 10 of the QS World University Rankings.

== Supporters of English independence ==
Political parties

- The Green Party of England and Wales supports Welsh independence and Scottish independence, the Scottish Greens support Scottish independence, and Green Party Northern Ireland would support Irish re-unification if the majority of people in Northern Ireland do so.
- English Democrats
- Mebyon Kernow supports Cornish devolution
- The Northern Independence Party supports Northern independence

== Opinion polls ==
The English nationalist movement has its roots in a historical legacy which predates the United Kingdom. The rise in English identity in recent years, as evidenced by the increased display of the English flag (particularly during international sporting competitions and in relation to their football team), is sometimes attributed in the media to the increased devolution of political power to Scotland, Wales and Northern Ireland.

One possible incentive for the establishment of self-governing English political institutions is the West Lothian question: the constitutional inconsistency whereby MPs from all four nations of the UK can vote on matters that solely affect England, while those same matters are reserved to the devolved assemblies of the other nations. (For example, the Scottish MP for West Lothian has a say on policing in the West Midlands.)

Contemporary English nationalist movements differ significantly from mainstream Scottish, Welsh and Cornish nationalist movements (whilst similar to some strands of Irish nationalism) insofar as they are often associated with support for right-of-centre economic and social policies. Nationalists elsewhere in the British Isles tend towards a social democratic political stance. English nationalism is also often associated with Euroscepticism: one reason for opposition to the European Union (EU) was the view that England was being arbitrarily subdivided into regions at the behest of the EU with limited say from the British Government.

Polling data for English devolution and independence may be found in the table below.

Date	Independence (%)	Status quo (%)	English Parliament (%)	English votes for English laws (%)	Regional Assemblies (%)	End devolution (%)	Don't know/None (%)
20 January 2021	15%	60%	N/A	N/A	N/A	N/A	13%
14 July 2020	34%	36%	N/A	N/A	N/A	N/A	30%
30 June 2020	27%	51%	N/A	N/A	N/A	N/A	22%
13 January 2012	N/A	16%	49%	N/A	N/A	N/A	35%
6 December 2011	N/A	21%	52%	N/A	N/A	14%	13%
15 April 2010	N/A	20%	68%	N/A	N/A	N/A	12%
30 April 2009	N/A	15%	41%	N/A	N/A	N/A	44%
9 September 2009	N/A	20%	58%	N/A	N/A	N/A	22%
6 December 2007	15%	32%	20%	25%	N/A	N/A	8%
19 April 2007	N/A	24.25%	67.32%	N/A	N/A	N/A	8.43%
5 April 2007	N/A	12%	21%	51%	N/A	N/A	16%
8 January 2007	N/A	32%	61%	N/A	N/A	N/A	7%
7 January 2007	N/A	41.22%	51.42%	N/A	N/A	N/A	7.36%
23 November 2006	N/A	25.35%	68.43%	N/A	N/A	N/A	6.22%
8 July 2006	N/A	32%	41%	N/A	14%	N/A	13%
23 February 2004	N/A	23.76%	11.88%	46.53%	10.89%	N/A	6.93%
7 April 2002	N/A	N/A	47%	N/A	28%	N/A	25%

== Organisations ==
A political party campaigning for English Independence was formed in February 2008, the Free England Party, it achieving some minor electoral success before disbanding in December 2009.

An English Parliament within the UK was the (3.2.2) 2016 Manifesto pledge of the English Democrats.

An English Independence party was registered in 2016. Its leader, Neil Humphrey, appeared on ballot papers as "ANTI Corbyn" in the 2016 Batley and Spen by-election.

== Apathy to the union ==
Some in England have argued, the contentious Barnett formula and West Lothian question would be solved through the breakup of the union and the independence of England.

In October 2017, 88% of leave voters polled would accept a "yes" vote win in a second Scottish independence referendum in return for Brexit, 81% of the same leave voters also saw destabilising the Northern Ireland peace process to be "worthwhile" to guarantee Brexit. Among leave voters, those supporting the Conservatives were more likely to support Scotland independence and Northern Ireland's peace process destabilised than Labour leave voters, although still a majority of Labour leave voters.

In 2018, polled voters in England stated by 62% they would want money raised in England spent in England and not in Northern Ireland, with 73% of Conservatives and 22% of Labour voters supporting this view. HM Treasury in 2018, gave £10.8 billion annually to Northern Ireland, compared to £8.6 billion annually to the EU.

In June 2019, a YouGov poll showed a majority of members of the UK-ruling Conservative Party would support Scotland and Northern Ireland breaking up the UK to achieve Brexit.

A November 2019 poll, showed collectively 58% of Leave voters across the UK were supportive of Scottish independence, this was composed of 41% of voters who would accept it, if it were the price for Brexit, and 17% of Leave voters would support Scottish independence regardless of circumstance. In the same poll, UK Leave voters were also asked on Welsh independence, with 28% yes to Welsh independence to 26% no, and for a United Ireland with 25% yes to 19% no, if these scenarios were the price to pay for Brexit.

A May 2021 poll, commissioned by The Daily Telegraph, showed only 32% of English voters were opposed to Scottish independence, with 25% supporting and 30% no strong opinion/opposition. A majority of those aged 18–34 believe an independent Scotland would "thrive", compared to only 19% of those over 55.

The Yorkshire Post argued Scottish independence would benefit England and give needed funds spent in Scotland to Yorkshire.

== Opposition ==
=== Political parties ===
Flag of England

Flag of the United Kingdom

The Conservative Party, Labour Party and Liberal Democrats, oppose English independence. Other parties that oppose(d) English independence are/were the UK Independence Party (UKIP), the British National Party (BNP), Britain First, the Britannica Party, the Scottish Unionist Party (SUP), the Respect Party, Ulster Unionist party, Democratic Unionist Party (DUP) and Ulster Unionist Party (UUP).

=== Unionist political parties in England ===
- Conservative Party
- Labour Party / Co-operative Party
- Liberal Democrats
- UK Independence Party
- Reform UK

== See also ==
- Devolved English parliament – Proposed institution in the UK
- English Democrats – Political party in England
- English nationalism – Nationalism that asserts that the English are a nation
- Federalism in the United Kingdom – Proposed constitutional reform of a division of powers
- Potential breakup of the United Kingdom
- Republicanism in the United Kingdom – Political movement to replace the United Kingdom's monarchy with a republic
- Scottish independence – Political movement for Scotland leaving the UK
- United Ireland – Proposition that Ireland be a single state
- Welsh independence – Welsh political philosophy
- West Lothian question – UK constitutional anomaly
