= All Under One Banner =

Scottish independence pressure group

- Founded: 12 October 2014
- Type: Lobby group
- Purpose: Scottish independence
- Region served: Scotland
- Method: Demonstrations
- Website: twitter.com/AUOBNOW

All Under One Banner (AUOB) is a Scottish independence pressure group created on 12 October 2014 with the objective of staging public processions in support of independence at regular intervals. Neil Mackay, AUOB founder, argued that a strategy of marches for independence across Scotland was needed to attract more attention to the independence movement after the 2014 Scottish independence referendum that saw a majority vote to remain in the United Kingdom.

== History ==
In the aftermath of the 2016 EU membership referendum (which saw the majority of voters in the UK as a whole vote to leave the European Union whilst most in Scotland voted to remain), large numbers of people took part in an event on 30 July 2016 at the 6th AUOB March. The following 3 June 2017 saw 25,000 demonstrators. After 2017 there was not another All Under One Banner march until the 5 May 2018, again at Glasgow, with a police estimate of 35,000 protesters. Following this demo AUOB embarked on a national tour: 2 June at Dumfries (around 1.100 attended); 23 June in Bannockburn (8,000)); 28 July in Inverness (5,000–7,500 according to the police, 14,000 according to the organisers); 18 August Dundee (16,000) with the final march of 2018 taking place in Edinburgh on the 6 October where an estimated 100,000 marched in protest against the outcome of the 2014 vote.

The largest march in Scotland was held on 4 May 2019 in Glasgow, attracting up to 90,000 protesters according to some estimates. Police Scotland estimated the attendance at the rally following the march to be 35,000 protestors. On 6 May, AOUB activist Manny Singh was arrested and charged with failing to follow the timing restrictions for the event.

All Under One Banner protested in Glasgow against the coronation of Charles III.

== Controversies ==
=== Allegations of misappropriated funds ===
In July 2019, AUOB co-founder, Neil Mackay stepped down after claims of misappropriated bucket cash donations were made by a fellow co-founder Manny Singh (who was also suspended at the time as Operations Director). Mackay resigned later in the month.

=== Accusations of racism ===
In July 2019, co-founder, Manny Singh was sacked as Operations Director by the National Executive of All Under One Banner, due to an alleged breach of Section 65 of the Civic Government (Scotland) Act 1982 for not sticking to the original route for a protest march and timing of the march despite Glasgow City Council's licensing committee ordering changes. Manny described the ruling by the National Executive as a Kangaroo Court. In August 2020, he described the movement was being damaged by anti-English racists who 'joked about colour of his skin'. A spokesperson for AUOB said “All Under One Banner acts in support of Scotland becoming an independent country and does so without any prejudice, be that in respect of race, religion, gender, age, sexual orientation, disability, nationality or ethnicity. The allegations are untrue.”

=== Planned marches during the COVID-19 pandemic ===
In October 2020, AUOB were criticised for planning to hold a march in Dundee during the COVID-19 pandemic by First Minister of Scotland Nicola Sturgeon and Dundee City Council leader John Alexander. The rally was eventually called off.

=== Inclusion of ultranationalist groups ===
All Under One Banner has faced criticism for including the fringe ultranationalist group Siol nan Gaidheal in its marches, which has been described as an ethnic nationalist, Anglophobic organisation. In 2018, the online magazine Bella Caledonia criticised AUOB for platforming what it described as a "fascist" group. AUOB replied that while Siol nan Gaidheal's banner was not welcome, it was unable to physically ban the organisation from its marches. In 2022, SNP MSP Evelyn Tweed apologised for appearing alongside a Siol nan Gaidheal banner at an AUOB march commemorating the Battle of Bannockburn.

=== Death of Alistair Darling ===
In November 2023, in reaction to the death of Alistair Darling, who led the Better Together campaign opposed to Scottish independence, the official AUOB Twitter account tweeted; "The darling lapdog of London rule who fronted the 2014 campaign to keep the people of Scotland in poverty. Good riddance to this treacherous man." The tweet was deleted following intense criticism. A Scottish Labour spokesman said: "This is a disgusting tweet from an organisation which has regularly hosted senior SNP figures at its marches. Not only should All Under One Banner delete and apologise for this vile message but the SNP should sever ties with these ghouls permanently."

== AUOB Cymru ==
AUOB Cymru is a Welsh independence organisation, inspired by AUOB in Scotland. Their first march was held in Cardiff on 11 May 2019, attracting thousands of participants.

== See also ==
- Radical Independence Campaign
