= United Ireland =

Proposition that Ireland be a single state

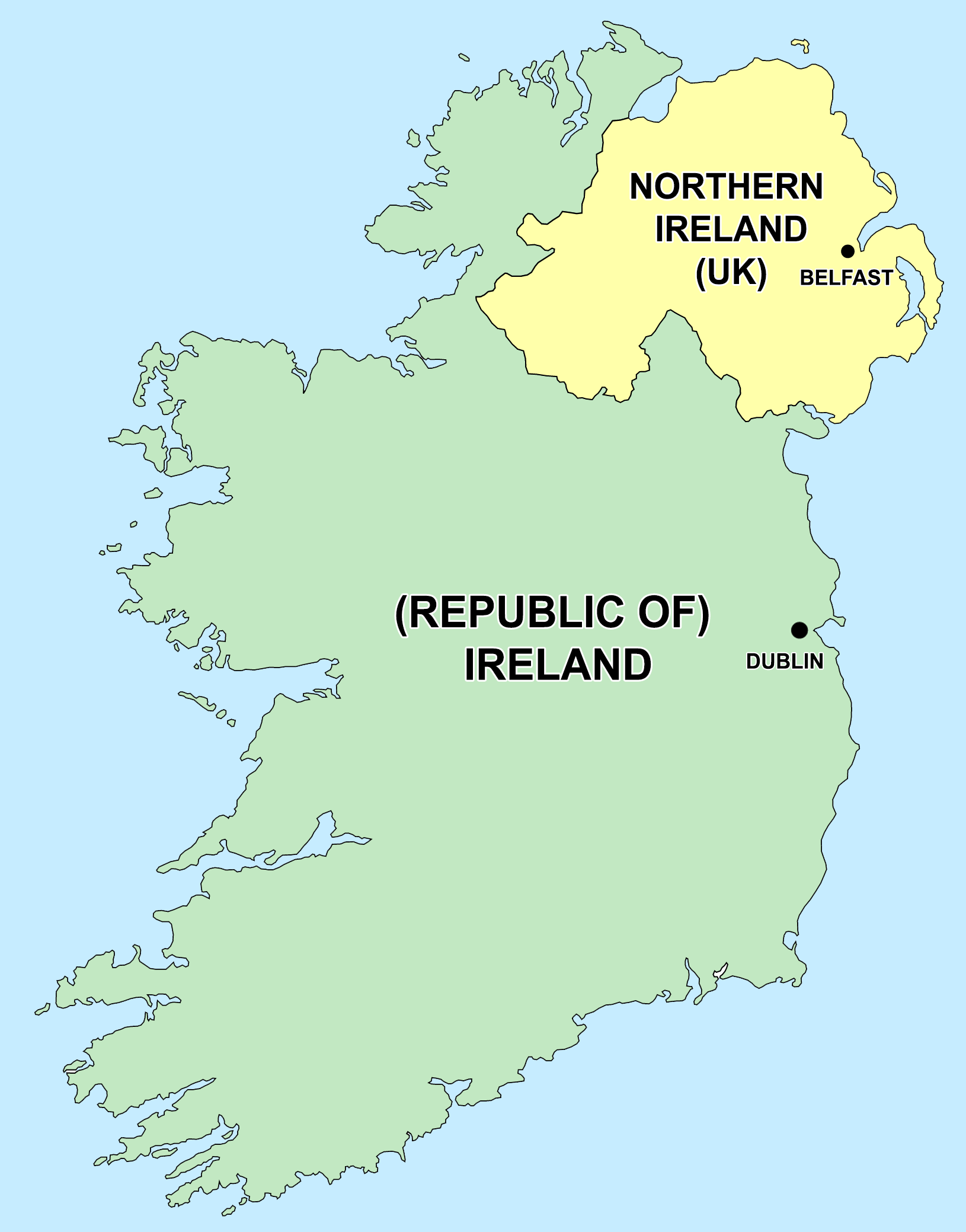
Ireland map; Republic of Ireland, Northern Ireland and their respective capitals

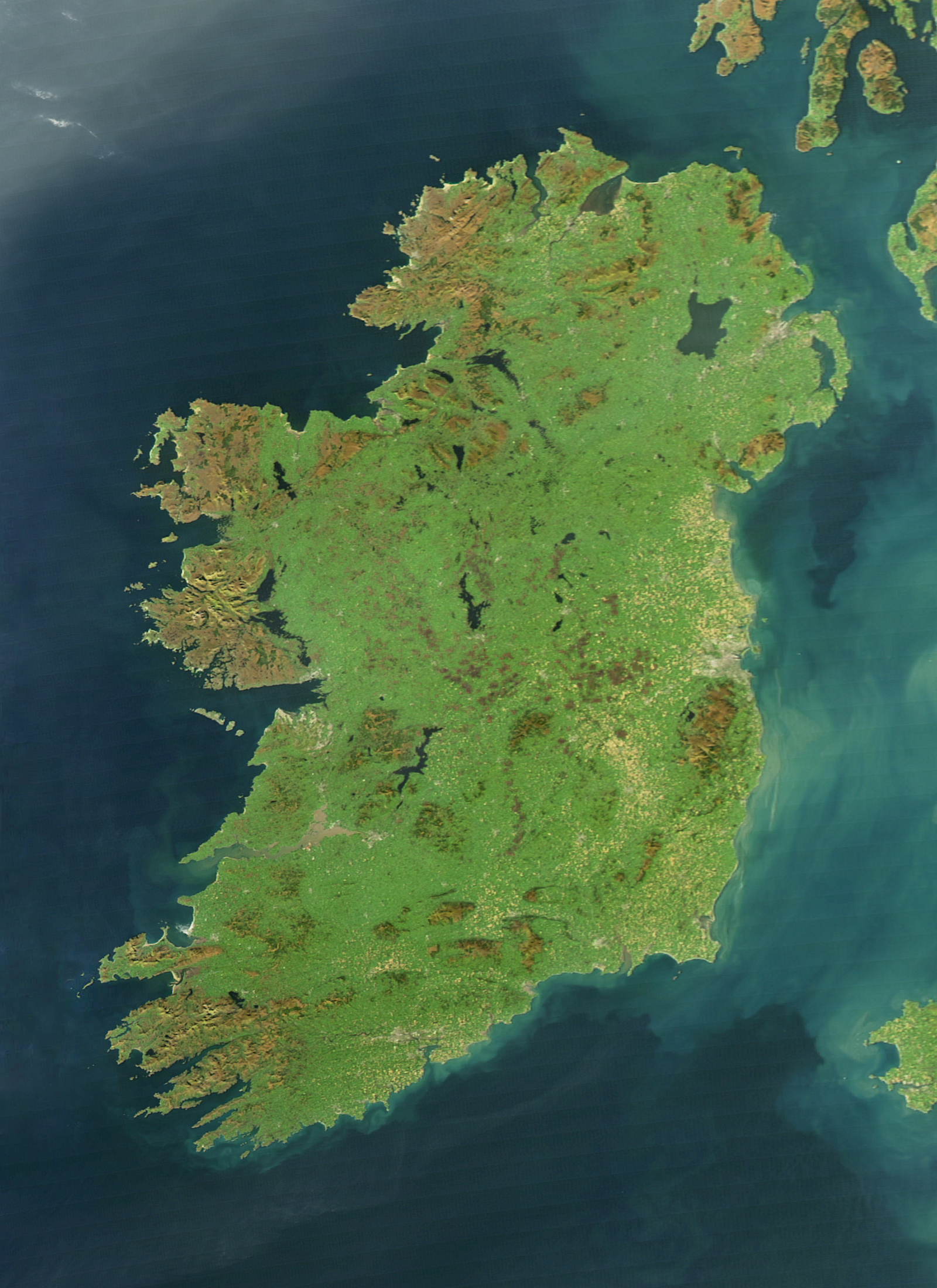
Satellite image of Ireland, nicknamed "The Emerald Isle"

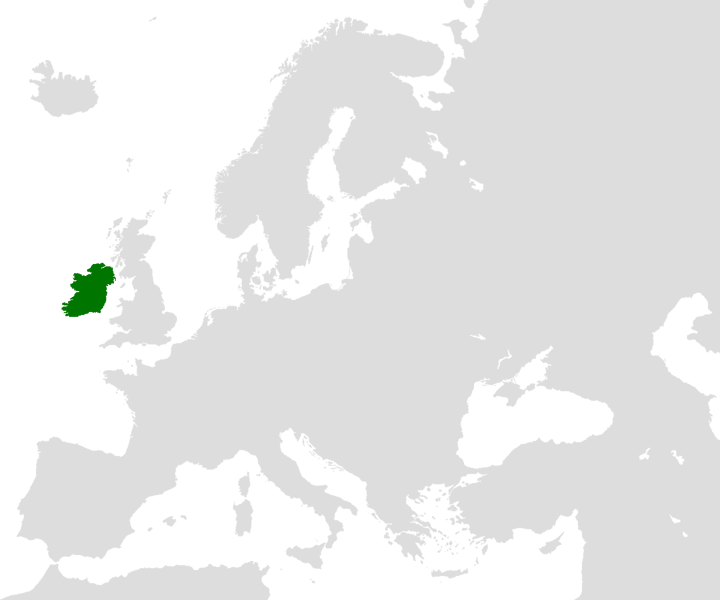
Ireland in Europe

United Ireland (Irish: Éire Aontaithe), also referred to as Irish reunification or a New Ireland, is the proposition that all of Ireland should be a single sovereign state. At present, the island is divided politically: the sovereign state of Ireland (legally described also as the Republic of Ireland) has jurisdiction over the majority of Ireland, while Northern Ireland, which lies entirely within (but consists of only 6 of 9 counties of) the Irish province of Ulster, is part of the United Kingdom. Achieving a united Ireland is a central tenet of Irish nationalism and Republicanism, particularly of both mainstream and dissident republican political as well as paramilitary organisations. Unionists support Northern Ireland remaining part of the United Kingdom and oppose Irish unification.

Ireland has been partitioned since May 1921, when the Government of Ireland Act 1920 came into effect, creating two separate jurisdictions—Southern Ireland and Northern Ireland—within the United Kingdom. Southern Ireland never fully functioned and was soon replaced by the Irish Free State in 1922, which became independent, while Northern Ireland opted to remain part of the UK. The Anglo-Irish Treaty, which led to the establishment in December 1922 of a dominion called the Irish Free State, recognised partition, but this was opposed by anti-Treaty republicans. When the anti-Treaty Fianna Fáil party came to power in the 1930s, it adopted a new constitution which claimed sovereignty over the entire island. The Irish Republican Army (IRA) had a united Ireland as its goal during the conflict with British security forces and loyalist paramilitaries from the 1960s to the 1990s known as The Troubles. The Good Friday Agreement signed in 1998, which ended the conflict, acknowledged the legitimacy of the desire for a united Ireland, while declaring that it could be achieved only with the consent of a majority of the people of both jurisdictions on the island, and providing a mechanism for ascertaining this in certain circumstances.

In 2016, following the United Kingdom's decision to leave the European Union with Brexit, Sinn Féin called for a referendum on Irish reunification. The decision had increased the perceived likelihood of a united Ireland, in order to avoid the possible requirement for a hard border between Northern Ireland and the Republic of Ireland, though the imposition of a hard border has not, as yet, eventuated. Fine Gael Taoiseach Enda Kenny successfully negotiated that in the event of reunification, Northern Ireland will become part of the EU, just as East Germany was permitted to join the EU's predecessor institutions by reuniting with the rest of Germany after the fall of the Berlin Wall.

The majority of Ulster Protestants, almost half the population of Northern Ireland, favour continued union with Great Britain, and have done so historically. Four of the six counties have Irish Catholic majorities, with majorities voting for Irish nationalist parties, and Catholics have become the plurality in Northern Ireland as of 2021. Religious affiliation in Northern Ireland offers only a general indication of political preference, as some Protestants support a united Ireland while some Catholics oppose it. Two surveys in 2011 identified a significant number of Catholics who favoured the continuation of the union without identifying themselves as unionists or British. In 2024, a survey showed supporters of the union equated to a plurality at 48.6%, rather than a majority in Northern Ireland for the first time, while 33.76% supported Irish unity.

== Legal basis for future change ==
Article 3.1 of the Constitution of Ireland "recognises that a united Ireland shall be brought about only by peaceful means with the consent of a majority of the people, democratically expressed, in both jurisdictions in the island". This provision was introduced in 1999 after implementation of the Good Friday Agreement, as part of replacing the old Articles 2 and 3, which had laid a direct claim to the whole island as the national territory.

The Northern Ireland Act 1998, a statute of the Parliament of the United Kingdom, provides that Northern Ireland will remain within the United Kingdom unless a majority of the people of Northern Ireland vote to form part of a united Ireland. It specifies that the Secretary of State for Northern Ireland "shall exercise the power [to hold a referendum] if at any time it appears likely to him that a majority of those voting would express a wish that Northern Ireland should cease to be part of the United Kingdom and form part of a united Ireland". Such referendums may not take place within seven years of each other.

The Northern Ireland Act 1998 supersedes previous similar legislative provisions. The Northern Ireland Constitution Act 1973 also provided that Northern Ireland remained part of the United Kingdom unless a majority voted otherwise in a referendum, while under the Ireland Act 1949 the consent of the Parliament of Northern Ireland was needed for a united Ireland. In 1985, the Anglo-Irish Agreement affirmed, while providing for devolved government in Northern Ireland, and an advisory role for the Republic of Ireland government, that any change in the status of Northern Ireland would only come about with the consent of a majority of the people of Northern Ireland.

== History ==
=== Home Rule, resistance and the Easter Rising ===
1885 general election winning party vote share by constituency (Note: The Representation of the People Act extending the vote to all men over 21 and most women over 30 did not arrive until 1918.)

The Kingdom of Ireland as a whole had become part of the United Kingdom of Great Britain and Ireland under the Acts of Union 1800. From the 1870s, support for some form of an elected parliament in Dublin grew. In 1870, Isaac Butt, who was a Protestant, formed the Home Government Association, which became the Home Rule League. Charles Stewart Parnell, also a Protestant, became leader in 1880, and the organisation became the Irish National League in 1882. Despite the religion of its early leaders, its support was strongly associated with Irish Catholics. In 1886, Parnell formed a parliamentary alliance with Liberal Party Prime Minister William Ewart Gladstone and secured the introduction of the First Home Rule Bill. This was opposed by the Conservative Party and led to a split in the Liberal Party, the Liberal Unionist Party.

Opposition in Ireland was concentrated in the heavily Protestant counties in Ulster. The difference in religious background was a legacy of the Ulster Plantation in the early seventeenth century. In 1893, the Second Home Rule Bill passed in the House of Commons, but was defeated in the House of Lords, where the Conservatives dominated. A Third Home Rule Bill was introduced in 1912, and in September 1912, just under half a million men and women signed the Ulster Covenant to swear they would resist its application in Ulster. The Ulster Volunteer Force were formed in 1913 as a militia to resist Home Rule.

The Government of Ireland Act 1914 (previously known as the Third Home Rule Bill) provided for a unitary devolved Irish Parliament, a culmination of several decades of work from the Irish Parliamentary Party. It was signed into law in September 1914 in the midst of the Home Rule Crisis and at the outbreak of the First World War. On the same day, the Suspensory Act 1914 suspended its actual operation.

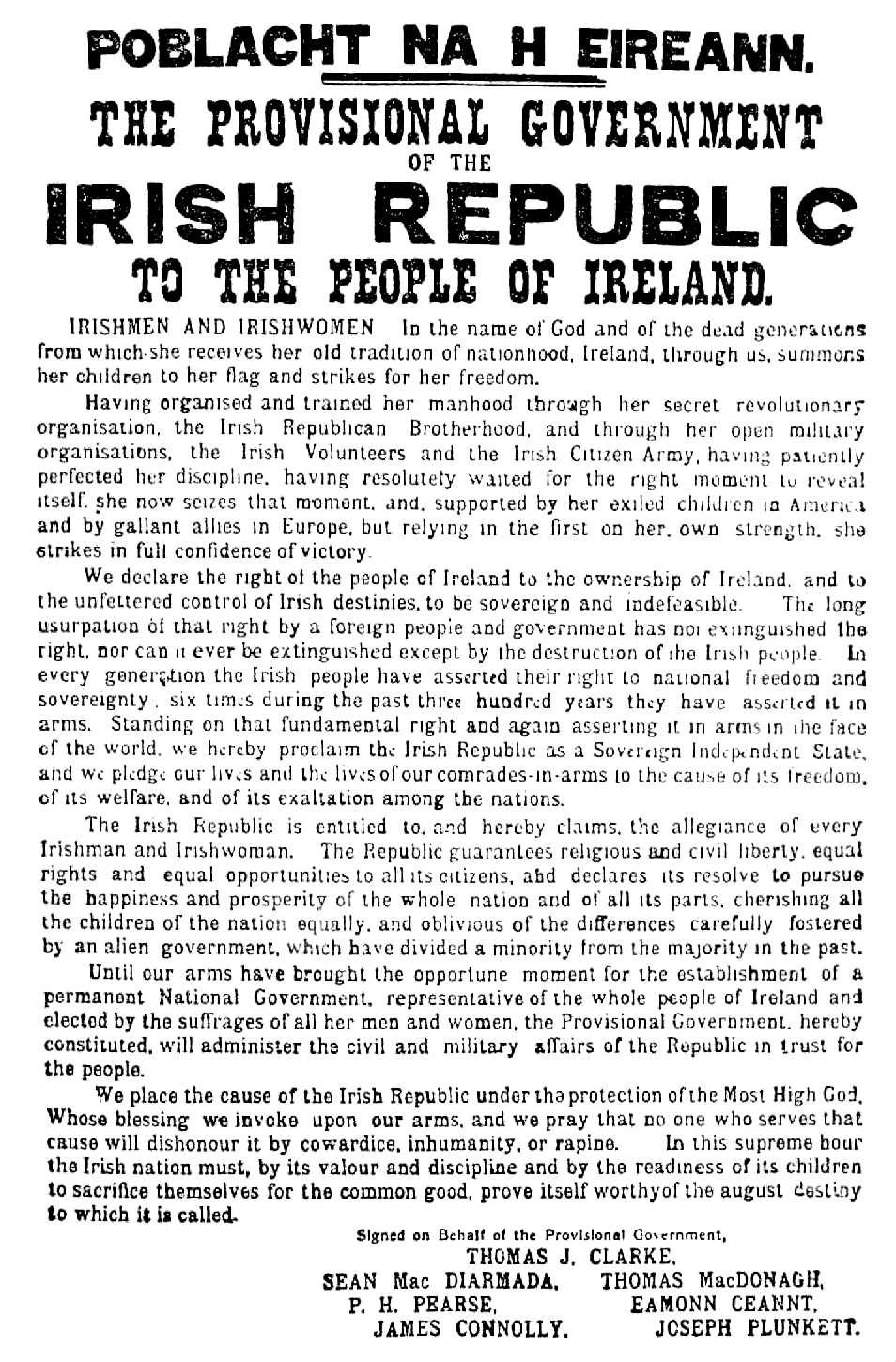
Proclamation of the Irish Republic, presented to the Irish people during the Easter Rising of 1916

In 1916, a group of revolutionaries led by the Irish Republican Brotherhood launched the Easter Rising, during which they issued a Proclamation of the Irish Republic. The rebellion was not successful and sixteen of the leaders were executed. The small separatist party Sinn Féin became associated with the Rising in its aftermath as several of those involved in it were party members.

The Irish Convention held between 1917 and 1918 sought to reach agreement on manner in which Home Rule would be implemented after the war. All Irish parties were invited, but Sinn Féin boycotted the proceedings. By the end of the First World War, a number of moderate unionists came to support Home Rule, believing that it was the only way to keep a united Ireland in the United Kingdom. The Irish Dominion League opposed partition of Ireland into separate southern and northern jurisdictions, while arguing that the whole of Ireland should be granted dominion status with the British Empire.

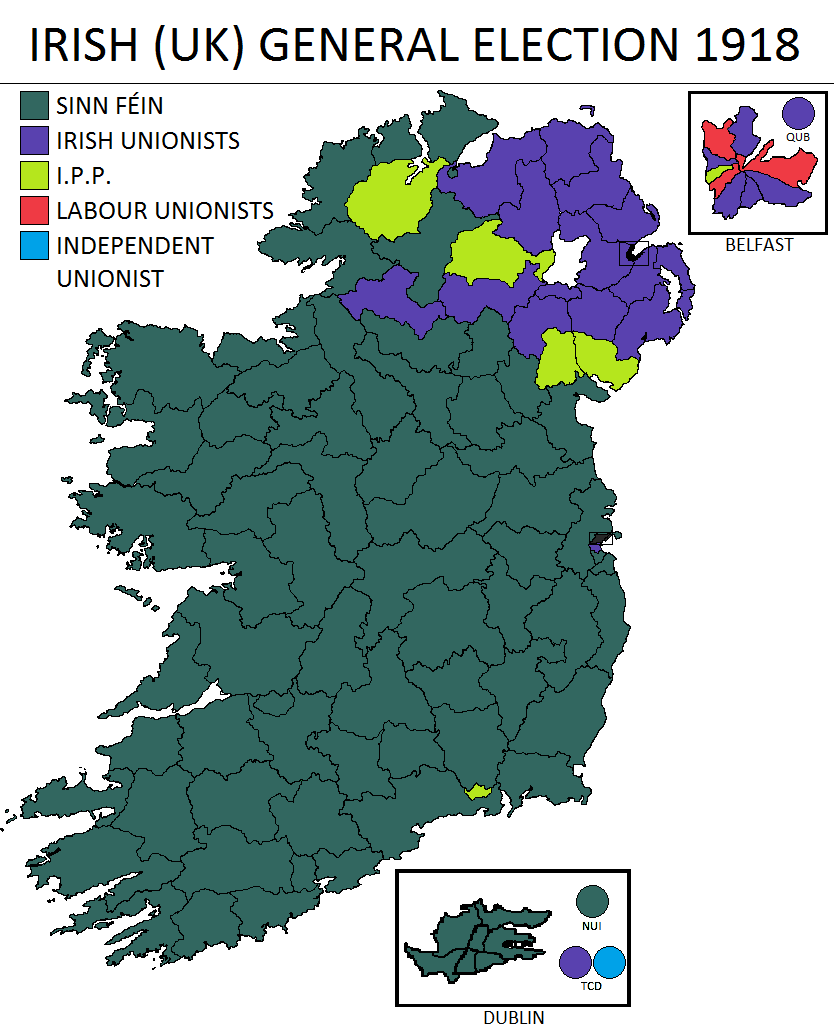
Result of the 1918 Irish general election

At the 1918 election Sinn Féin won 73 of the 105 seats; however, there was a strong regional divide, with the Ulster Unionist Party (UUP) winning 23 of the 38 seats in Ulster. Sinn Féin had run on a manifesto of abstaining from the United Kingdom House of Commons, and from 1919 met in Dublin as Dáil Éireann. At its first meeting, the Dáil adopted the Declaration of Independence of the Irish Republic, a claim which it made in respect of the entire island. Supporters of this Declaration fought in the Irish War of Independence.

=== Two jurisdictions ===
During this period, the Government of Ireland Act 1920 repealed the previous 1914 Act, and provided for two separate devolved parliaments in Ireland. It defined Northern Ireland as "the parliamentary counties of Antrim, Armagh, Down, Fermanagh, Londonderry and Tyrone, and the parliamentary boroughs of Belfast and Londonderry" and Southern Ireland "so much of Ireland as is not comprised within the said parliamentary counties and boroughs". Section 3 of this Act provided that the parliaments may be united by identical acts of parliament:

1. The Parliaments of Southern Ireland and Northern Ireland may, by identical Acts agreed to by an absolute majority of members of the House of Commons of each Parliament at the third reading ..., establish, in lieu of the Council of Ireland, a Parliament for the whole of Ireland consisting of His Majesty and two Houses (which shall be called and known as the Parliament of Ireland), ... and the date at which the Parliament of Ireland is established is hereinafter referred to as the date of Irish union.

Sinn Féin did not recognise this act, treating elections to the respective parliaments as a single election to the Second Dáil. While the Parliament of Northern Ireland sat from 1921 to 1972, the Parliament of Southern Ireland was suspended after its first meeting was boycotted by the Sinn Féin members, who comprised 124 of its 128 MPs. A truce in the War of Independence was called in July 1921, followed by negotiations in London between the government of the United Kingdom and a Sinn Féin delegation. On 6 December 1921, they signed the Anglo-Irish Treaty, which led to the establishment of the Irish Free State the following year, a dominion within the British Empire.

With respect to Northern Ireland, Articles 11 and 12 of the Treaty made special provision for it including as follows:

11. Until the expiration of one month from the passing of the Act of Parliament for the ratification of this instrument, the powers of the Parliament and the government of the Irish Free State shall not be exercisable as respects Northern Ireland, and the provisions of the Government of Ireland Act 1920, shall, so far as they relate to Northern Ireland, remain of full force and effect, and no election shall be held for the return of members to serve in the Parliament of the Irish Free State for constituencies in Northern Ireland, unless a resolution is passed by both Houses of the Parliament of Northern Ireland in favour of the holding of such elections before the end of the said month. — 12. If before the expiration of the said month, an address is presented to His Majesty by both Houses of the Parliament of Northern Ireland to that effect, the powers of the Parliament and the Government of the Irish Free State shall no longer extend to Northern Ireland, and the provisions of the Government of Ireland Act, 1920, (including those relating to the Council of Ireland) shall so far as they relate to Northern Ireland, continue to be of full force and effect, and this instrument shall have effect subject to the necessary modifications...

The Prime Minister of Northern Ireland, Sir James Craig, speaking in the House of Commons of Northern Ireland in October 1922 said that "when 6 December [1922] is passed the month begins in which we will have to make the choice either to vote out or remain within the Free State". He said it was important that that choice be made as soon as possible after 6 December 1922 "in order that it may not go forth to the world that we had the slightest hesitation". On 7 December 1922, the day after the establishment of the Irish Free State, the Houses of the Parliament of Northern Ireland resolved to make the following address to the King so as to exercise the rights conferred on Northern Ireland under Article 12 of the Treaty:

MOST GRACIOUS SOVEREIGN, We, your Majesty's most dutiful and loyal subjects, the Senators and Commons of Northern Ireland in Parliament assembled, having learnt of the passing of the Irish Free State Constitution Act, 1922, being the Act of Parliament for the ratification of the Articles of Agreement for a Treaty between Great Britain and Ireland, do, by this humble Address, pray your Majesty that the powers of the Parliament and Government of the Irish Free State shall no longer extend to Northern Ireland.

The King received it the following day. These steps cemented Northern Ireland's legal separation from the Irish Free State.

In Irish republican legitimist theory, the Treaty was illegitimate and could not be approved. According to this theory, the Second Dáil did not dissolve and members of the Republican Government remained as the legitimate government of the Irish Republic declared in 1919. Adherents to this theory rejected the legitimacy of both the Irish Free State and Northern Ireland.

The report of Boundary Commission in 1925 established under the Treaty did not lead to any alteration in the border.

Within Northern Ireland, the Nationalist Party was an organisational successor to the Home Rule Movement, and advocated the end of partition. It had a continuous presence in the Northern Ireland Parliament from 1921 to 1972, but was in permanent opposition to the UUP government.

A new Constitution of Ireland was proposed by Éamon de Valera in 1937 and approved by the voters of the Irish Free State (thereafter simply Ireland). Articles 2 and 3 of this Constitution claimed the whole island of Ireland as the national territory, while claiming legal jurisdiction only over the previous territory of the Irish Free State.

Article 2

The national territory consists of the whole island of Ireland, its islands and the territorial seas.

Article 3

Pending the re-integration of the national territory, and without prejudice to the right of the parliament and government established by this constitution to exercise jurisdiction over the whole territory, the laws enacted by the parliament shall have the like area and extent of application as the laws of Saorstát Éireann and the like extra-territorial effect.

Article 15.2 allowed for the "creation or recognition of subordinate legislatures and for the powers and functions of these legislatures", which would have allowed for the continuation of the Parliament of Northern Ireland within a unitary Irish state.

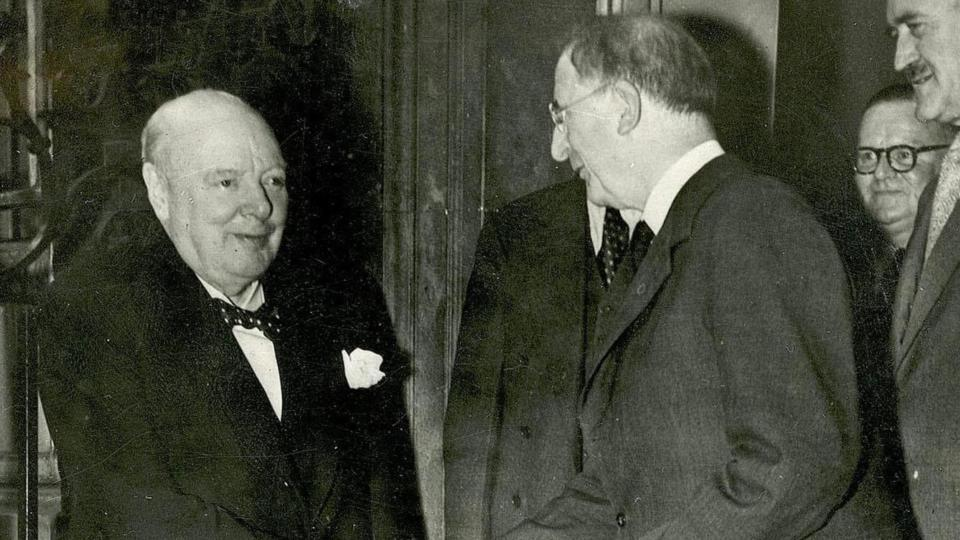
Winston Churchill and Éamon de Valera, pictured 1953

The UK's wartime Prime Minister Winston Churchill was amenable to Irish unification. In June 1940, he approached de Valera to discuss Irish support in World War II, as Ireland had remained neutral. He sought authorization for British ships to dock in Ireland and access for aviation. The deal offered a united Ireland to be established within "a relatively brief time". De Valera turned down the deal, as he believed the United Kingdom would not keep its promise and may have lost the war anyway, which at that time went poorly. In particular, he doubted London would be able to influence the unionists into accepting such an agreement. Churchill proposed this again in December 1941 but was similarly declined. In 1946, the now former prime minister Churchill told the Irish High Commissioner to the United Kingdom, "I said a few words in Parliament the other day about your country because I still hope for a United Ireland. You must get those fellows in the north in, though; you can't do it by force. There is not, and never was, any bitterness in my heart towards your country." He later said, "You know I have had many invitations to visit Ulster but I have refused them all. I don't want to go there at all, I would much rather go to southern Ireland. Maybe I'll buy another horse with an entry in the Irish Derby."

Under the Republic of Ireland Act 1948, Ireland declared that the country may officially be described as the Republic of Ireland and that the President of Ireland had the executive authority of the state in its external relations. This was treated by the British Commonwealth as ending Irish membership. In response, the United Kingdom passed the Ireland Act 1949. Section 1(2) of this act affirmed the provision in the Treaty that the position of Ireland remained a matter for the Parliament of Northern Ireland:

It is hereby declared that Northern Ireland remains part of His Majesty's dominions and of the United Kingdom and it is hereby affirmed that in no event will Northern Ireland or any part thereof cease to be part of His Majesty's dominions and of the United Kingdom without the consent of the Parliament of Northern Ireland.

The political organization Irish Anti-Partition League (APL) existed in Northern Ireland from 1945-1958. One of its founding members was the political leader from Derry, Cahir Healy. In 1958 Healy wrote about the decline of the APL and the economic conditions which helped keep partition in place:

"...so far as we in the six counties are concerned, we lived in a united Ireland prior to 1916, now we live in a divided one. The insistence upon a Republic or nothing but has left us with partition. There is, indeed, no material lure to northern nationalists to go into a Republic...we get so many subsidies paid indirectly by England, in order to make partition work, that many who used to help the Anti-Partition League now look upon the prospect with different eyes...Partition will go in time but the fear is that when the time comes that attraction will only be a sentimental one."

In 1956 Irelands Taoiseach (or Prime Minister) John A. Costello tasked the Department of External Affairs with preparing a document that summarized Irish policy on partition. The document advocated for efforts to win over moderate Unionists in Northern Ireland but stated bluntly that "We are no nearer to success than in 1923."

Between 1956 and 1962, the IRA engaged in a border campaign against British Army and Royal Ulster Constabulary outposts with the aim of ending British rule in Northern Ireland. This coincided with brief electoral success of Sinn Féin, which won four seats at the 1957 Irish general election. This was its first electoral success since 1927, and it did not win seats in the Republic of Ireland again until 1997. The border campaign was entirely unsuccessful in its aims. In 1957, Prime Minister Harold Macmillan wrote that "I do not think that a United Ireland – with de Valera as a kind of Irish Nehru would do us much good. Let us stand by our friends."

=== Calls for unification, start of the Troubles ===
The Northern Ireland civil rights movement emerged in 1967 to campaign for civil rights for Catholics in Northern Ireland. Tensions between republican and loyalist groups in the north erupted into outright violence in the late 1960s. In 1968 the Irish Taoiseach, Jack Lynch, raised the issue of partition in London: "It has been the aim of my government and its predecessors to promote the reunification of Ireland by fostering a spirit of brotherhood among all sections of the Irish people. The clashes in the streets of Derry are an expression of the evils which partition has brought in its train." He later stated to the press that the ending of partition would be "a just and inevitable solution to the problems of Northern Ireland."

Lynch renewed his call to end partition in August 1969 when he proposed negotiations with Britain with the hope of merging the Irish Republic and Northern Ireland into a federal type state. Lynch proposed that the two parliaments continue to function with a Council of Ireland having authority over the entire country. The Prime Minister of Northern Ireland James Chichester-Clark rejected the proposal.

In August 1971 Lynch proposed that the Government of Northern Ireland (Stormont) be replaced with an administration that would share power with Catholics. The next day the Northern Ireland Prime Minister Brian Faulkner rejected Lynch's statement and stated that "no further attempt by us to deal constructively with the present Dublin government is possible." Later in 1971 British Labour Party leader (and future Prime Minister) Harold Wilson proposed a plan that would lead to a united Ireland after a 15-year transitional period. He called for the establishment of a commission that would examine the possibility of creating a united Ireland which would be agreed upon by all three parliaments. The Northern Ireland Prime Minister rejected the proposal and reiterated the desire that Northern Ireland remain an integral part of the United Kingdom. The Irish Taoiseach indicated the possibility of amending the Irish constitution to accommodate the Protestants of Northern Ireland and urged the British government to "declare its interest in encouraging the unity of Ireland".

In 1969 the British government deployed troops in what would become the longest continuous deployment in British military history Operation Banner. The Provisional Irish Republican Army (IRA) had begun a thirty-year campaign against British security forces with the aim of achieving a united Ireland.

In 1970, the Social Democratic and Labour Party (SDLP) was established to campaign for civil rights and a united Ireland by peaceful, constitutional means. The party rose to be the dominant party representing the nationalist community until the early twenty-first century.

In 1972, the parliament of Northern Ireland was suspended, and under the Northern Ireland Constitution Act 1973, it was formally abolished. Section 1 of the 1973 Act stated,

It is hereby declared that Northern Ireland remains part of Her Majesty's dominions and of the United Kingdom, and it is hereby affirmed that in no event will Northern Ireland or any part of it cease to be part of Her Majesty's dominions and of the United Kingdom without the consent of the majority of the people of Northern Ireland voting in a poll held for the purposes of this section in accordance with Schedule 1 to this Act.

A border poll was held in Northern Ireland in 1973. The SDLP and Sinn Féin called for a boycott of the poll. 98.9% of votes cast supported remaining part of the United Kingdom. The poll was overwhelmingly boycotted by nationalists, and the turnout was therefore 58.7%. The pro-UK vote did however represent 57.5% of the entire electorate, notwithstanding the boycott.

In 1983, the Irish government led by Taoiseach Garret FitzGerald established the New Ireland Forum as a consultation on a new Ireland. Though all parties in Ireland were invited, the only ones to attend were Fine Gael, Fianna Fáil, the Labour Party and the SDLP. Its report considered three options: a unitary state, i.e., a united Ireland; a federal/confederal state; and joint sovereignty. These options were rejected by Prime Minister Margaret Thatcher. In 1985, the governments of Ireland and of the United Kingdom signed the Anglo-Irish Agreement; the British government accepted an advisory role for the Irish government in the future of Northern Ireland. Article 1 of the Agreement stated that the future constitutional position of Northern Ireland would be a matter for the people of Northern Ireland:

The two Governments

(a) affirm that any change in the status of Northern Ireland would only come about with the consent of a majority of' the people of' Northern Ireland; (b) recognise that the present wish of a majority of the people of Northern Ireland is for no change in the status of Northern Ireland;

(c) declare that, if in the future a majority of the people of Northern Ireland clearly wish for and formally consent to the establishment of a united Ireland, they will introduce and support in the respective Parliaments legislation to give effect to that wish.

In the 1993 Downing Street Declaration, Taoiseach Albert Reynolds and Prime Minister John Major issued a joint statement, in which Major, "reiterated on behalf of the British Government, that they have no selfish strategic or economic interest in Northern Ireland".

=== Good Friday Agreement ===
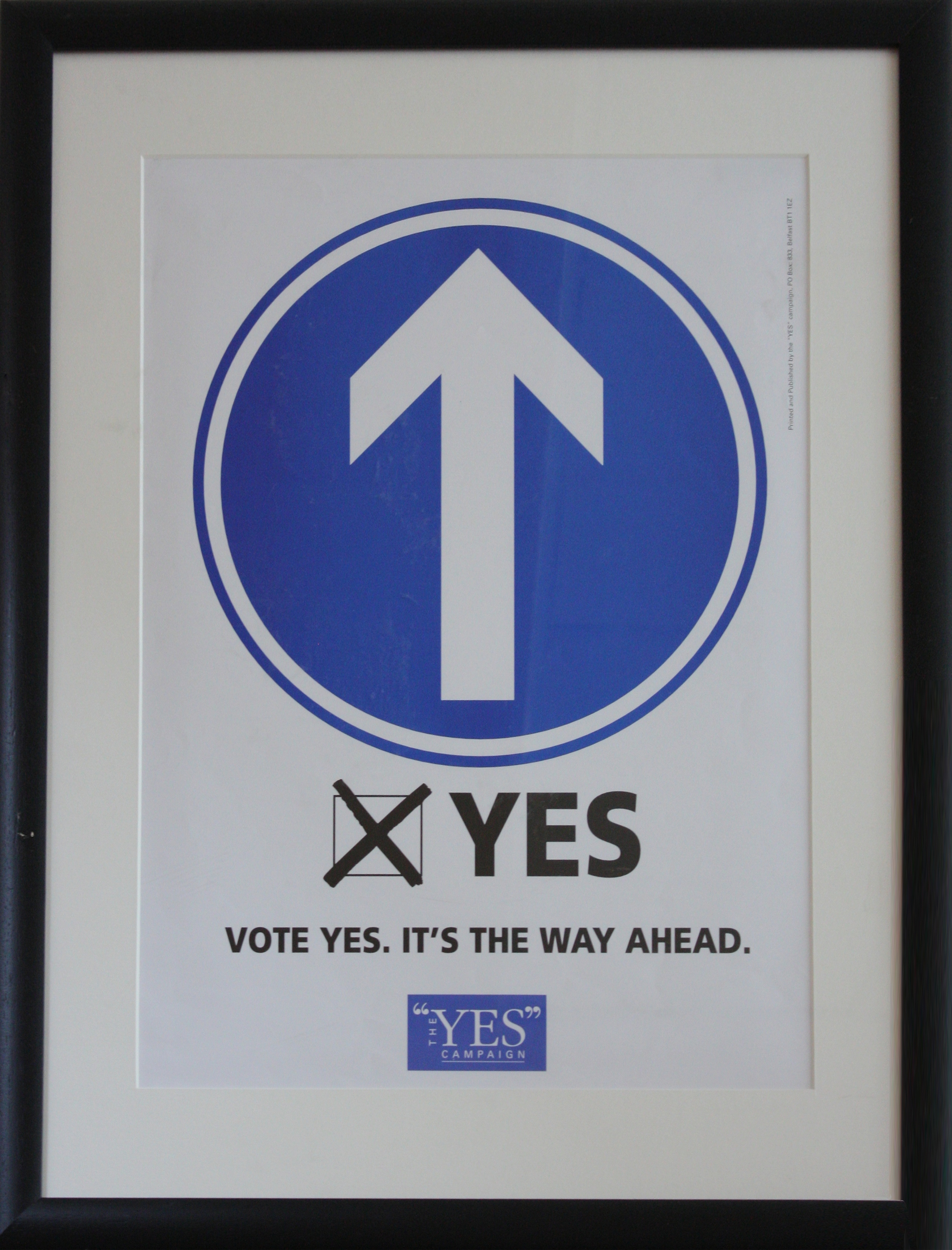
"Vote Yes, It's the way Ahead", Yes Campaign for the Belfast Agreement, 1998

The Good Friday Agreement in 1998 was a culmination of the peace process. The agreement acknowledged nationalism and unionism as "equally legitimate, political aspirations". In the Northern Ireland Assembly, all members would designate as Unionist, Nationalist, or Other, and certain measures would require cross-community support. The agreement was signed by the governments of Ireland and of the United Kingdom. In Northern Ireland, it was supported by all parties who were in the Northern Ireland Forum with the exception of the Democratic Unionist Party and the UK Unionist Party, and it was supported by all parties in the Oireachtas. It was also opposed by dissident republicans, including Republican Sinn Féin and the 32 County Sovereignty Movement. It was approved in referendums in Northern Ireland and in the Republic of Ireland.

Included in the Agreement were provisions which became part of the Northern Ireland Act 1998 on the form of a future referendum on a united Ireland. In essence the Good Friday Agreement provided the opportunity for self determination and mutual respect. Those born in Northern Ireland could identify as Irish. The freedom of movement, allowed citizens of either jurisdiction to live in which ever part of the island they wanted, thereby enabling them to choose which state they paid taxes to or claimed benefits from. The 'Two state' solution advocated for conflict resolution in other jurisdictions therefore applied. Provision within the Agreement allows for a simple majority to vote in favour of Irish Unification, but does not explain how the dissolution of the two states solution would lead to the inclusion of the unionist population into a unified Ireland in which they would constitute 13% of the population. A fear of political, civil and economic turmoil and a lack of protection for minority rights, as experienced by the Catholic community in Northern Ireland and the Protestant community in the Republic of Ireland historically, is a key driver towards the desire for the maintenance of the status quo on both sides of the border.

Section 1. Status of Northern Ireland.
1. It is hereby declared that Northern Ireland in its entirety remains part of the United Kingdom and shall not cease to be so without the consent of a majority of the people of Northern Ireland voting in a poll held for the purposes of this section in accordance with Schedule 1.
2. But if the wish expressed by a majority in such a poll is that Northern Ireland should cease to be part of the United Kingdom and form part of a united Ireland, the Secretary of State shall lay before Parliament such proposals to give effect to that wish as may be agreed between Her Majesty's Government in the United Kingdom and the Government of Ireland.

[...]

Schedule 1

1. The Secretary of State may by order direct the holding of a poll for the purposes of section 1 on a date specified in the order.
2. Subject to paragraph 3, the Secretary of State shall exercise the power under paragraph 1 if at any time it appears likely to him that a majority of those voting would express a wish that Northern Ireland should cease to be part of the United Kingdom and form part of a united Ireland.
3. The Secretary of State shall not make an order under paragraph 1 earlier than seven years after the holding of a previous poll under this Schedule.

On the establishment of the institutions in 1999, Articles 2 and 3 of the Constitution of Ireland were amended to read:

Article 2

It is the entitlement and birthright of every person born in the island of Ireland, which includes its islands and seas, to be part of the Irish nation. That is also the entitlement of all persons otherwise qualified in accordance with law to be citizens of Ireland. Furthermore, the Irish nation cherishes its special affinity with people of Irish ancestry living abroad who share its cultural identity and heritage.

Article 3

1. It is the firm will of the Irish nation, in harmony and friendship, to unite all the people who share the territory of the island of Ireland, in all the diversity of their identities and traditions, recognising that a united Ireland shall be brought about only by peaceful means with the consent of a majority of the people, democratically expressed, in both jurisdictions in the island. Until then, the laws enacted by the Parliament established by this Constitution shall have the like area and extent of application as the laws enacted by the Parliament that existed immediately before the coming into operation of this Constitution.
2. Institutions with executive powers and functions that are shared between those jurisdictions may be established by their respective responsible authorities for stated purposes and may exercise powers and functions in respect of all or any part of the island.

The agreement was largely successful in concluding the violence, which led to the final withdrawal of British troops from Northern Ireland in 2007. Subsequent agreements strengthened the devolved arrangement- this included the removal of Westminster's direct rule powers with the St Andrews Agreement in 2006, and the devolution of policing and justice powers with the Hillsborough Castle Agreement in 2010.

=== Brexit and the Northern Ireland Protocol ===
Voting on the Brexit referendum in Northern Ireland Leave Remain

In a referendum in June 2016, the United Kingdom voted to leave the European Union, in what was known as Brexit. However, a majority of those voting in Northern Ireland (and in Scotland) voted for the UK to remain. Of the parties in the Assembly, only the Democratic Unionist Party (DUP), the Traditional Unionist Voice (TUV) and People Before Profit (PBP) had campaigned for a Leave vote. Irish politicians began the discussion regarding possible changes to the border between Northern Ireland and the Republic of Ireland. The status and treatment of Northern Ireland and Gibraltar, the only parts under control of the United Kingdom which would have new land borders with the EU following the UK withdrawal, became important to the negotiations, along with access to the regional development assistance scheme (and new funding thereof) from the European Union.

Sinn Féin cited these concerns as the basis for new discussion on a united Ireland. These calls were rejected by the British government and Unionist politicians, with Secretary of State for Northern Ireland Theresa Villiers arguing that there was no evidence that opinion in Northern Ireland had shifted towards being in favour of a united Ireland.

==== 2017 Assembly election ====
Result of 2017 Northern Ireland Assembly election, shaded in the combined first preference vote share of the largest party in each constituency

In the 2017 Assembly election, the DUP lost ten seats and came just one seat ahead of Sinn Féin. Sinn Féin used this opportunity to call for a Northern Ireland referendum on a united Ireland.

==== EU guarantee on a potential united Ireland ====
The Brexit Secretary, David Davis, confirmed to Mark Durkan, the SDLP MP for Foyle, that in the event of Northern Ireland becoming part of a united Ireland, "Northern Ireland would be in a position of becoming part of an existing EU member state, rather than seeking to join the EU as a new independent state." Enda Kenny pointed to the provisions that allowed East Germany to join the West and the EEC during the reunification of Germany as a precedent. In April 2017 the European Council acknowledged that, in the event of Irish unification, "the entire territory of such a united Ireland would [...] be part of the European Union." The SDLP manifesto for the 2017 UK general election called for a referendum on a united Ireland after the UK withdraws from the EU. However the Secretary of State for Northern Ireland at the time, James Brokenshire, said the conditions for a vote are "not remotely satisfied".

==== 2017 general election ====
After the 2017 election, the UK government was reliant on confidence and supply from the Democratic Unionist Party. The deal supported the Conservative-led government through the Brexit negotiation process. The 2020 Brexit withdrawal agreement included the Northern Ireland Protocol, which established different trade rules for the territory than Great Britain. While Northern Ireland would de jure leave the single market, it would still enforce all EU customs rules, while Britain would diverge. This would result in a regulatory "border in the Irish Sea" rather than a border between Northern Ireland and the Republic of Ireland, and caused fears from unionist politicians about Brexit causing a weakening of the UK.

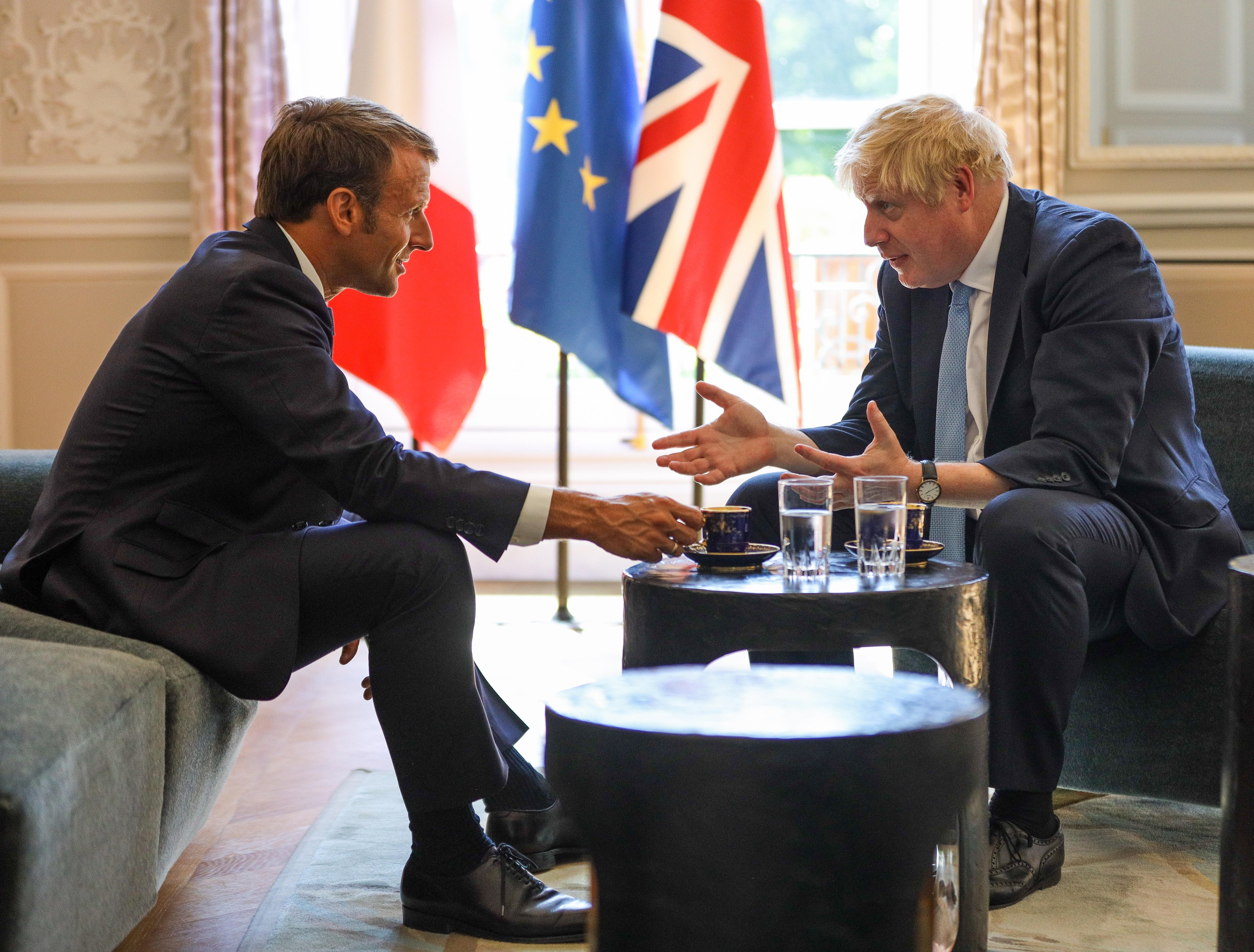
Johnson and Macron meet during Brexit negotiations, 2019.

==== Brexit negotiations continue ====
In August 2020, the UK prime minister Boris Johnson stated that there would be "no border down the Irish Sea". Dominic Cummings later alleged that Johnson did not understand the deal at the time it was signed, while Ian Paisley Jr alleged that Johnson had privately promised to "tear up" the deal after it was agreed. In September, Johnson sought to unilaterally dis-apply parts of the Northern Ireland protocol, despite the Northern Ireland Secretary Brandon Lewis acknowledging this broke international law in a "specific and limited way". The bill was rejected by the House of Lords, resulting in several provisions being withdrawn before it passed in December 2020—shortly before the protocol was due to come into effect.

The implementation of the protocol, and the new regulatory hurdles had a negative effect on east–west trade, and drew strong condemnation from unionist figures, including DUP members such as First Minister Arlene Foster. Staff making the required checks were threatened, resulting in a temporary suspension of checks at Larne and Belfast ports. In February 2021, several unionist parties began a legal challenge, alleging that the protocol violated the Act of Union 1800, the bill which had originally merged Ireland with the United Kingdom, as well as the Good Friday Agreement. The challenge was dismissed in June, with the court deciding that the protocol—and other legislation in the intervening 200 years—had effectively repealed parts of the Act of Union.

On 4 March 2021 the Loyalist Communities Council withdrew its support for the peace agreement, while indicating that opposition to it should not be in the form of violence. Riots erupted in loyalist areas at the end of the month, continuing until 9 April. The protocol's implementation, and opposition within the DUP, resulted in the announcement of Foster's resignation on 28 April. The Irish Times interviewed loyalist Shankill Road residents that month and found significant anger at the DUP, and accusations that the community had been "sold short" on the protocol. Foster was replaced by Paul Givan later that year, though he too resigned in February 2022 over the continued existence of the protocol.

The UK government sought to re-negotiate the protocol, a prospect poorly received by EU leaders such as Emmanuel Macron. When discussing the effects of the protocol in June 2021, Leo Varadkar outlined a vision for a united Irish state with devolved representation in the North. He added "It should be part of our mission as a party to work towards it." Talks aimed at amending the customs checks required by the protocol began in October; though Maroš Šefčovič indicated that the protocol itself will not be re-negotiated. In December 2021, the UK's chief negotiator Lord Frost resigned his post over "concerns about the current direction of travel".

==== 2022 Assembly election ====
Results of the 2022 Northern Ireland Assembly election

After the results of the 2022 Northern Ireland Assembly election, Sinn Féin were set to become the largest party in the assembly for the first time, with the DUP coming in second place. Sinn Féin won 27 seats, compared to the DUP's 25. Sinn Féin said that it will be at least a decade-long plan for Irish unity, which would only happen after an island-wide conversation.

==== Windsor Framework and return to Stormont ====
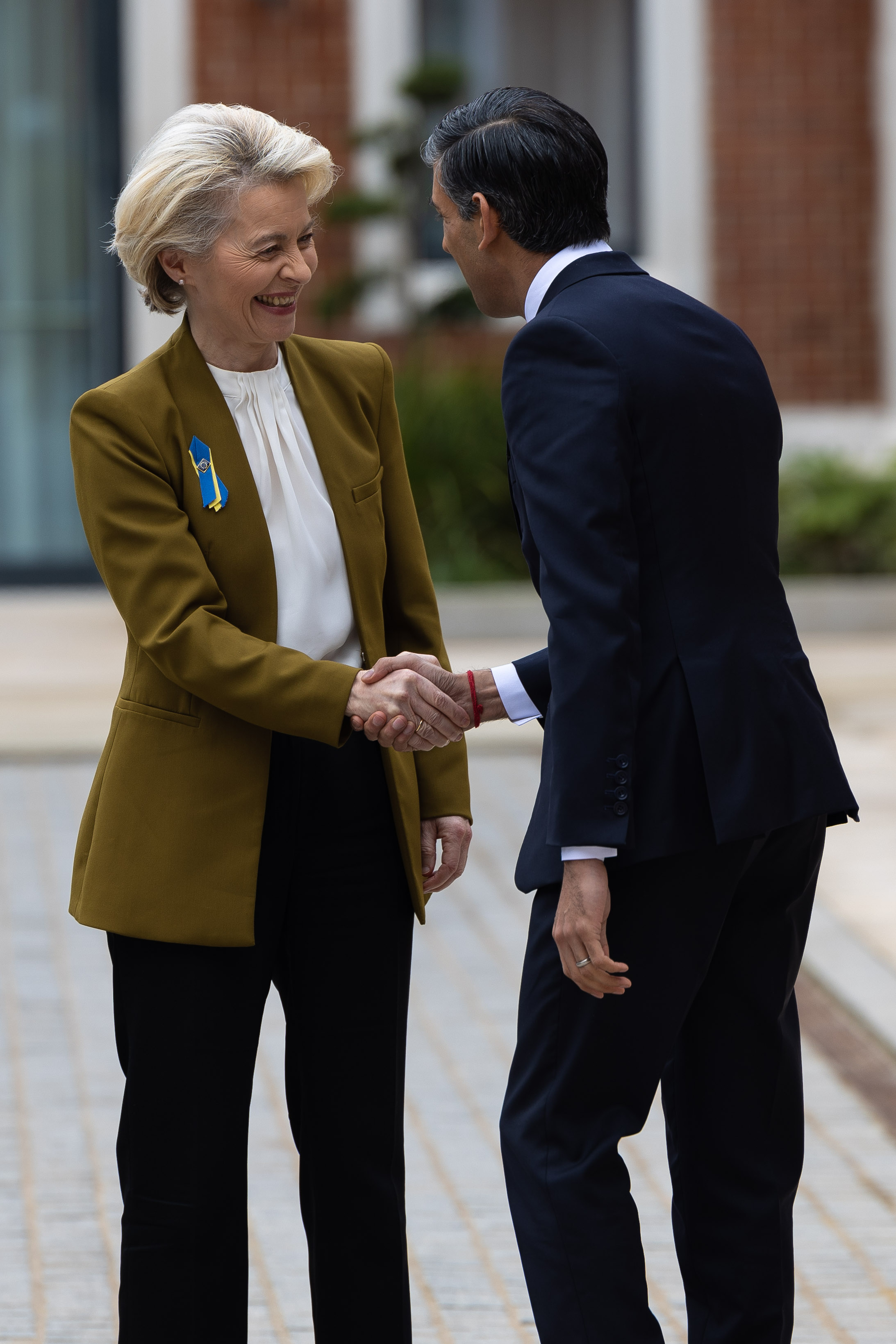
Sunak and Von der Leyen

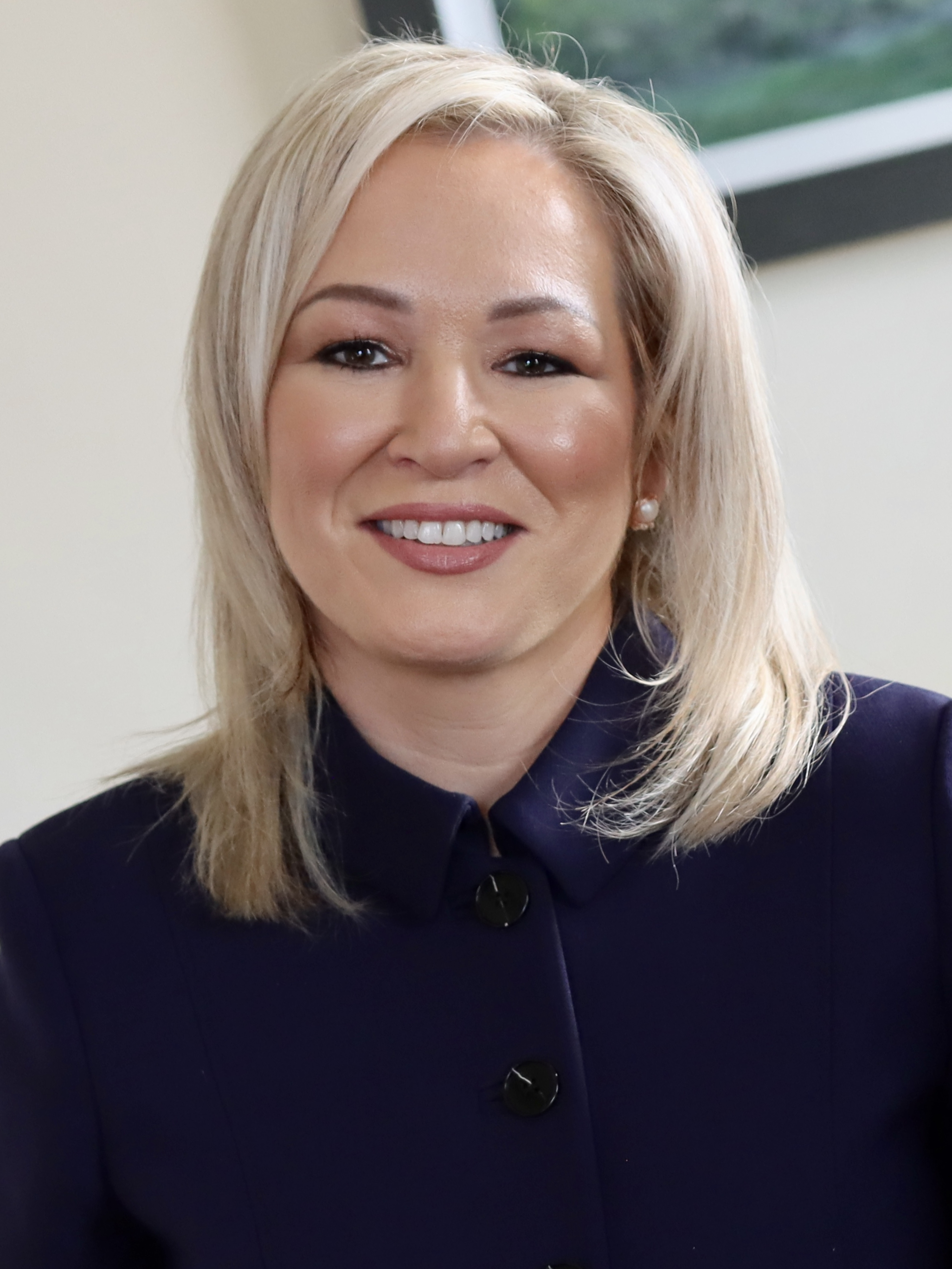
Michelle O'Neill in 2024

In February 2023, UK Prime Minister Rishi Sunak and President of the European Commission Ursula von der Leyen announced a new agreement called the Windsor Framework including a green lane for trade between Britain and Northern Ireland and a red lane for Republic of Ireland and EU trade. Sinn Féin called for a restoration of devolved governance following the deal whilst the DUP continued their boycott.

On 31 January 2024, a deal between the DUP and the UK government led to the abolition of "routine" checks on goods from Britain sent to Northern Ireland with the intention of staying there. A new body, Intertrade UK will be formed to promote trade within the UK, modelled on the all-Ireland body, InterTradeIreland. The deal also includes UK government ministers being compelled to inform Parliament if a Bill they are introducing will have "significant adverse implications for Northern Ireland's place in the UK internal market". On the basis of the deal, the DUP decided to return to devolved governance in Stormont.

On 3 February 2024, Michelle O'Neill became the first Irish nationalist First Minister. After taking office as First Minister, O'Neill stated that she expected a referendum on the reunification in accordance with the Good Friday Agreement to be held within the following decade.

== Shared Island ==
In 2021, the Irish Government launched the "Shared Island" initiative, to fund projects enhancing cross-border cooperation. In February 2024, it was announced that a total of €1 billion of funding from the Irish government was committed for:

- €600m towards the A5 road
- Construction of Narrow Water Bridge between the Mourne Mountains and the Cooley Peninsula
- New hourly rail service between Belfast and Dublin
- €50m towards Casement Park
- €10m towards a visitor experience at the Battle of the Boyne site
- Cross-border women's entrepreneurship

The Narrow Water bridge, linking Omeath to Warrenpoint, began construction in June 2024. During an Ireland's Future event in the same month, Taoiseach Leo Varadkar proposed that the Irish government set up a State fund using current budget surpluses that could then be used in the event of a United Ireland. Also at the event, Michelle O'Neill promised that Casement Park would be built "on my watch".

== Potential referendum time and criteria ==
=== Timescale proposals ===
In 2020, Ireland Taoiseach Micheál Martin said that a referendum on Irish unity should not be held for 5 years, adding, "once Brexit happened, it should not be a catalyst for something like a border poll. I thought that would be too divisive and would only exacerbate the tensions there because of Brexit itself".

Sinn Féin president Mary Lou McDonald suggested in 2020 that an "All-Ireland Forum on Unity" be created to plan for all aspects of reunification, including a referendum by 2025, claiming that "Irish Unity is the best idea for the future of the country". In 2021, Gerry Adams told the Irish Government that it should begin planning for a border poll and that one could happen within three years.

DUP leader Jeffrey Donaldson has said in April 2022 that Northern Ireland does not need a border poll at all and that it would be divisive. In May, Mary Lou McDonald said that a referendum would be possible within 5 years. First minister elect, Michelle O’Neill launched Sinn Féin's manifesto at the Canal Court Hotel in Newry in March 2023 which was a 16-page document including a commitment to set a date on a unity referendum. In February 2024, McDonald said that she expected the referendums to occur by 2030. Political scientist Brendan O'Leary also suggested the year 2030 as a potential tipping point.

In October 2023, Taoiseach Leo Varadkar said that it was not currently the right time to hold a referendum because the evidence indicated the referendum would not be won. If a referendum was held, work would need to be done to convince unionists that this was the right path and that a United Ireland would be a "warm home" for them.

The UK government-DUP deal published on 31 January 2024 said there was "no realistic prospect of a border poll". On 4 February, the day after becoming First Minister, Michelle O'Neill contested this, outlining her vision of a "decade of opportunity"; in other words, a border poll could be held in 10 years.

=== Criteria ===
The conditions under which a referendum should be called have been the subject of debate for some years. Responsibility for this judgement rests with the UK government's Secretary of State for Northern Ireland. The Northern Ireland Act 1998 specifies that one should be held if "at any time it appears likely to him that a majority of those voting would express a wish that Northern Ireland should cease to be part of the United Kingdom and form part of a united Ireland". The terminology is vague, not setting out strict criteria or means of measuring public opinion. There is also a minimum period of seven years between any referendums.

In September 2022, Northern Ireland shadow secretary Peter Kyle (of the Labour Party) said that he would set out border poll criteria. He however never held the office. When asked about the criteria, Northern Ireland secretary Chris Heaton-Harris said that those interested "need to read the Belfast/Good Friday Agreement, it’ll give you a good clue". Northern Ireland Parliamentary Under-Secretary of State for Northern Ireland Fleur Anderson said in April 2025 that the criteria for a border poll "would be based on opinion polls". However, the Northern Ireland Office subsequently backtracked from this claim, saying "responsibility for a referendum rests solely with the Secretary of State". Many politicians have called for clarity on the criteria since 2022, including Leo Varadkar, Michelle O'Neill, John Major and Micheál Martin.

The topic was often discussed in the aftermath of the 2023 Northern Ireland local elections, where the three largest unionist parties received over 38 per cent of the vote and the parties in favour of a united Ireland received 41 per cent of the vote. Jeffrey Donaldson suggested that the criteria for a border poll had not been met because unionists had more seats. This however was only true when excluding pro-Irish unity independents and People Before Profit. In October 2023, Heaton-Harris added that there was no basis to suggest a majority in Northern Ireland currently supported a United Ireland and that the UK government supported all aspects of the Good Friday Agreement, including the use of a simple majority of >50% in the event of a referendum. UUP leader Doug Beattie also suggested in June 2023 that the criteria has not been met for a border poll. He added that restoration of the executive would halt a swing in support of Sinn Féin and a United Ireland. Ian Paisley Jr. suggested that support to unify Ireland is not adequate and that should a vote come about, a supermajority and a turnout quota should be required for a border poll.

== Political positions on a united Ireland ==
=== Parties of Ireland ===
Provinces of Ireland

Within the Northern Ireland Assembly, its members (abbreviated as MLAs, members of the Legislative Assembly) designate as Unionist, Nationalist or Other. The DUP (25 seats), the UUP (9 seats), the TUV (1 seat) and Independent MLA Claire Sugden are designated as Unionist; Sinn Féin (which won 27 seats in the 2022 Northern Ireland Assembly election) and the SDLP (8 seats) are designated as Nationalist; the Alliance Party (17 seats) and PBP (1 seat) are designated as Other. However, People Before Profit (PBP) is in favour of Irish Unity. The allocation of seats shows that roughly the same share (about 40 per cent each) are strictly for and against a united Ireland (35 Unionist versus 36 Nationalist), with the neutral, liberal, and non-sectarian Alliance Party leadership and voters, representing a share of about 20 per cent of eligible voters, being the decisive factor behind any decision on a united Ireland within Northern Ireland.

Within the Oireachtas (National Parliament of the Republic of Ireland), there has traditionally been broad support for a united Ireland, with differences over the twentieth century on how it would be achieved. This includes Sinn Féin, which has had seats in the Dáil since 1997. The initial party constitution of Fianna Fáil in 1926 under Éamon de Valera included as the first of its aims, "To secure the Unity and Independence of Ireland as a Republic". In 1937, de Valera proposed the Constitution of Ireland which laid claim to the whole island of Ireland. In the 1980s, led by Charles Haughey, the party opposed the consideration of options other than a unitary state in the New Ireland Forum Report and opposed the Anglo-Irish Agreement; this stance led in part to the Des O'Malley and Mary Harney leaving Fianna Fáil and establishing the Progressive Democrats, a party that lasted from 1985 to 2008. Fianna Fáil leaders Albert Reynolds and Bertie Ahern led Irish governments in favour of the Downing Street Declaration and the Good Friday Agreement respectively.

When formed in 1933, Fine Gael initially used the subtitle United Ireland. Fine Gael leader Garret FitzGerald convened the New Ireland Forum in 1983 and negotiated the Anglo-Irish Agreement. In the aftermath of the vote on Brexit, Enda Kenny sought assurances on the position of Northern Ireland in the case of a united Ireland. The Irish Labour Party has adopted a similar approach to Fine Gael in government to a united Ireland.

==== Minor parties ====
In a survey of TDs conducted by TheJournal.ie on support for a border poll and a united Ireland conducted in December 2016, only TDs from the Anti-Austerity Alliance (now Solidarity) stated they were opposed to a united Ireland at the present moment.

There are a number of minor nationalist parties, including the Irish Republican Socialist Party, which supports a united socialist Irish state and is affiliated with the Irish National Liberation Army. Another such party, Republican Sinn Féin, linked to the Continuity IRA, maintain the Irish republican legitimist theory that neither state in Ireland is legitimate. Its Éire Nua (in English, New Ireland) policy advocates a unified federal state with regional governments for the four provinces and the national capital in Athlone. None of these parties has significant electoral support.

=== British parties ===
Of the British parties, the Conservative Party is explicitly unionist; it has formally been called the Conservative and Unionist Party since a merger with the Liberal Unionist Party in 1912. The UUP was affiliated with the National Union of Conservative and Unionist Associations until 1985. The Northern Ireland Conservatives are a minor unionist party in Northern Ireland.

Historically, there has been support for a united Ireland within the left of the British Labour Party, and in the 1980s it became official policy to support a united Ireland by consent. The policy of "unity by consent" continued into the 1990s, eventually being replaced by a policy of neutrality in line with the Downing Street Declaration. The former Labour leader Jeremy Corbyn supports a united Ireland, although he has said that it is "up for the Irish people to decide" whether to remain part of the UK. They do not organise electorally in Northern Ireland, respecting the SDLP as their sister party within the Party of European Socialists. Similarly, the Liberal Democrats co-operate with the Alliance Party and share their support of the Good Friday Agreement while expressing reservations about what they perceive as 'institutionalised sectarianism' in the agreement. Former Alliance leader Lord Alderdice is a member of the Liberal Democrats in the House of Lords. One supporter of a United Ireland in the Liberal Democrats was Michael Meadowcroft, MP for Leeds West between 1983 and 1987.

== Issues ==
=== Arguments for ===
==== Economic ====
Neale Richmond of Fine Gael says that unifying Ireland as a unitary state within the EU would benefit the economy across the island. He also argues it would allow the simplification of the systems of healthcare, public transport, education and more.

Sinn Féin says that economic powers held in London contribute to Northern Ireland being the slowest growing economy of the British Isles and also negatively impacts the economy of the Republic of Ireland. They cite lower paid and less secure jobs in the North and say that a United Ireland would allow for a more coordinated economic strategy and increasing investment, productivity and improving infrastructure, particularly in the border region. Sinn Féin also suggests that unity will improve public revenue returns, overall output, and higher-skilled employment.

==== Cultural ====
The Irish rugby flag

The Irish national rugby union team has been cited as a unifying force across Ireland and a "gesture of unity". The team has been described as "showing the best what island has to offer" and has sometimes been described as a United Ireland team.

==== Reconciliation ====
Jim O'Callaghan of Fianna Fáil suggests that a United Ireland would bring people on the island closer together, reconcile old conflicts and increase the number of opportunities for young people.

=== Arguments against ===
==== Identity ====
Many Unionist Protestants in Northern Ireland argue they have a distinct identity that would be overwhelmed in a united Ireland. They cite the decline of the small Protestant population of the Republic of Ireland since independence from the United Kingdom, the economic cost of unification, their place in a key international player within the UK and their mainly non-Irish ancestry. Unionist people in Northern Ireland primarily find their cultural and ethnic identity from the Scottish and English whose descendants can be found in the three counties of Ulster which are governed by the Republic of Ireland. Such individuals celebrate their Scots heritage each year like their counterparts in the other six counties. While Catholics in general consider themselves to be Irish, Protestants generally see themselves as British, as shown by several studies and surveys performed between 1971 and 2006.

Many Protestants do not consider themselves as primarily Irish, as many Irish nationalists do, but rather within the context of an Ulster or British identity. A 1999 survey showed that a little over half of Protestants felt "Not at all Irish", while the rest "felt Irish" in varying degrees.

== Constitutional options ==
A report by University College London found four constitutional options for a United Ireland;

- A single central legislature in e.g. Dublin. This model is considered the historic choice for many Irish republicans but may not be seen as favourable by some unionists.
- Maintain the devolved institutions in the North but with sovereignty transferred from London to Dublin.
- A federal state, which might be Northern Ireland and the South, the four historic provinces of Connacht, Leinster, Munster and Ulster, or some other configuration.
- A confederation of two independent states. UCL suggested this would not meet the terms of unity as clearly (1998 Belfast Good Friday Agreement).

== In popular culture ==
The 1990 episode of the American science fiction television series Star Trek: The Next Generation, "The High Ground", featured a discussion between Data and Jean-Luc Picard which states that Ireland was unified in 2024. As a result, this episode was not originally shown by the BBC in the United Kingdom due to the Troubles. It was not broadcast in the Republic of Ireland by the Star Trek rights' holder, RTÉ, during the show's run though UK broadcasts were received there. Initial UK airings were edited and shown for the first time on the satellite channel Sky One on 29 November 1992. The episode was finally broadcast unedited, 16 years later, in May 2006 on Sky One and shown unedited on BBC Two during the third season's repeats after midnight on 29 September 2007.

== See also ==
=== Ireland ===
- Demographics of Northern Ireland
- Politics of Northern Ireland
- Irish nationalism
- Protestant Irish nationalists
- Ulster nationalism
- Opinion polling on a United Ireland

=== Other ===
- Scottish independence
- Welsh independence
- English independence
- Cornish devolution
- Separatism in the United Kingdom
- Reunification of Brittany
