= Federalism in the United Kingdom =

Proposed constitutional reform of a division of powers

Map of the countries of the United Kingdom. (Note: Northern Ireland may be also described as a province or region.) From top, clockwise – Scotland (blue), England (red), Wales (green), Northern Ireland (yellow). Proposals for federation may involve the granting of autonomy to some or all constituent countries, and/or subdivisions of them.

Federalism in the United Kingdom aims at constitutional reform to achieve a federal United Kingdom or a British federation, where there is a division of legislative powers between two or more levels of government, so that sovereignty is decentralised between a federal government and autonomous governments in a federal system.

The United Kingdom is a constitutional monarchy governed via parliamentary democracy. It comprises the countries of England, Scotland, Wales, and Northern Ireland. The UK also operates a system of devolution from a central UK Parliament, with a UK Government led by a prime minister as head of government, to the devolved legislatures of the Scottish Parliament, Senedd (Welsh Parliament) and Northern Ireland Assembly with first ministers and their own respective governments. In England, only Greater London and the combined authorities, currently have varying degrees of devolved powers, with proposals for an England-wide or regional devolution.

Compared to the current system of devolution, in a true federal system, autonomy as well as devolved powers would be considered constitutionally protected, requiring more than an Act of Parliament to modify or revoke powers. Autonomy could also potentially be applied uniformly across the entire United Kingdom, compared to the varying levels of devolution at present. The Scotland Act 2016 and the Wales Act 2017 made the Scottish Parliament and Senedd permanent parts of the British constitution, requiring a referendum in each respective country to remove the legislatures, although the UK Parliament still retains the sovereign right to adjust devolved powers.

Federalism was first proposed in the late 19th century to address increasing calls for Irish Home Rule, the awarding of autonomy for Ireland within the United Kingdom of Great Britain and Ireland. The proposals failed and the Irish Free State was formed instead. Since a system of devolution was implemented in the late 20th century, some have proposed that a transition be made towards a federation or confederation, as an effort by unionists to combat separatism.

== Current status of the UK ==
The United Kingdom is an asymmetrically decentralised unitary state and a constitutional monarchy governed via parliamentary democracy. The UK Parliament is composed of the House of Commons and the House of Lords, the UK Government is led by the prime minister, Andy Burnham, and the head of state is King Charles III. The UK comprises four countries, one being England, and the other three Scotland, Wales, and Northern Ireland having devolved governments. A system of devolution is in place in the UK, with powers transferred from the central UK Parliament to the devolved legislatures of the Scottish Parliament, Senedd (Welsh Parliament) and Northern Ireland Assembly, each with first ministers and their own respective governments. The devolved countries do not have the same level of powers, therefore are not symmetrical with each other, and they all operate on a reserved model, where it is only clarified what powers they do not have. In England, only Greater London and the combined authorities, mostly headed by mayors, currently have varying degrees of devolved powers, while there have been proposals for a England-wide parliament or devolution to the regions of England.

The UK Parliament retains the constitutional tradition of parliamentary sovereignty, therefore as devolution and the subsequent establishment of devolved institutions are products of UK statute, the UK Parliament can theoretically reverse devolution. Although the Scotland Act 2016 and the Wales Act 2017 made the Scottish Parliament and Senedd permanent parts of the British constitution, requiring a referendum in each respective country to remove the legislatures, but the UK Parliament still retains the sovereign right to adjust devolved powers. "The UK is a unitary state, not a federation or a confederation," according to Lord David Frost. However, it is arguable that the UK is instead a 'union state', and that it is more politically/nationally diverse than even some federal states.

== History of nation devolution ==
=== Scotland, Northern Ireland and Wales ===
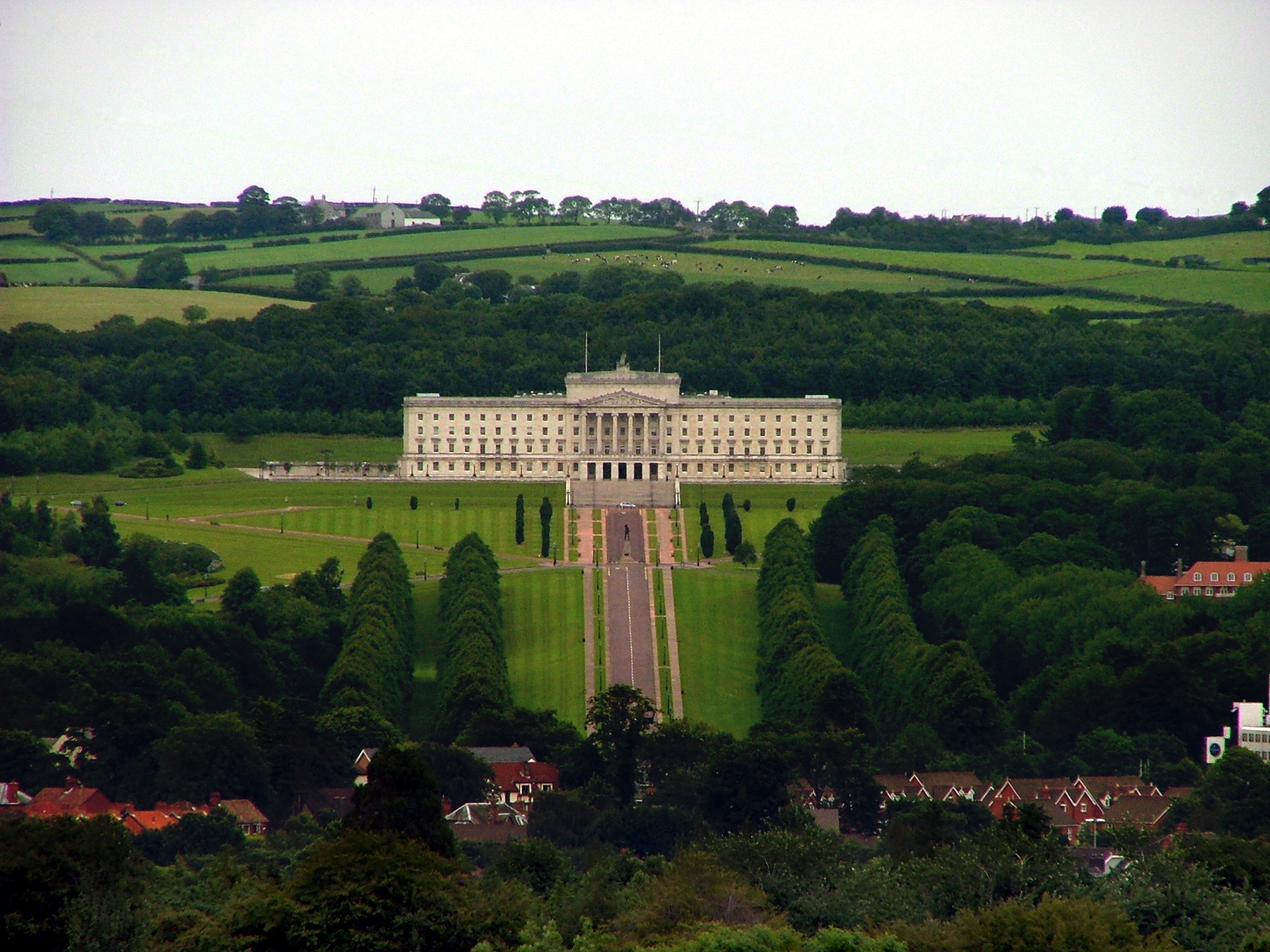
Northern Ireland Parliament Buildings

In the late 19th and early 20th centuries, Irish home rule was a divisive political issue. The First and Second Home Rule Bills failed to pass the UK Parliament. The Third Home Rule Bill was introduced in 1912 by Prime Minister H. H. Asquith, intended to provide home rule in Ireland, with some additional proposals for home rule in Scotland, Wales, and areas of England. The implementation of the Bill was delayed by the outbreak of the First World War. At war's end the UK parliament, responding to Northern Irish Protestant lobbying, passed the Fourth Home Rule Bill which divided Ireland into a six-county Northern Ireland and a twenty-six county Southern Ireland, each with its own parliament and judiciary. The Southern Parliament only met once: London acknowledged the sovereignty of southern Ireland as the Irish Free State, within the British Commonwealth, at the end of 1921. The Northern Ireland Parliament remained until 1972 when it was abolished due to sectarian conflict in the Troubles.

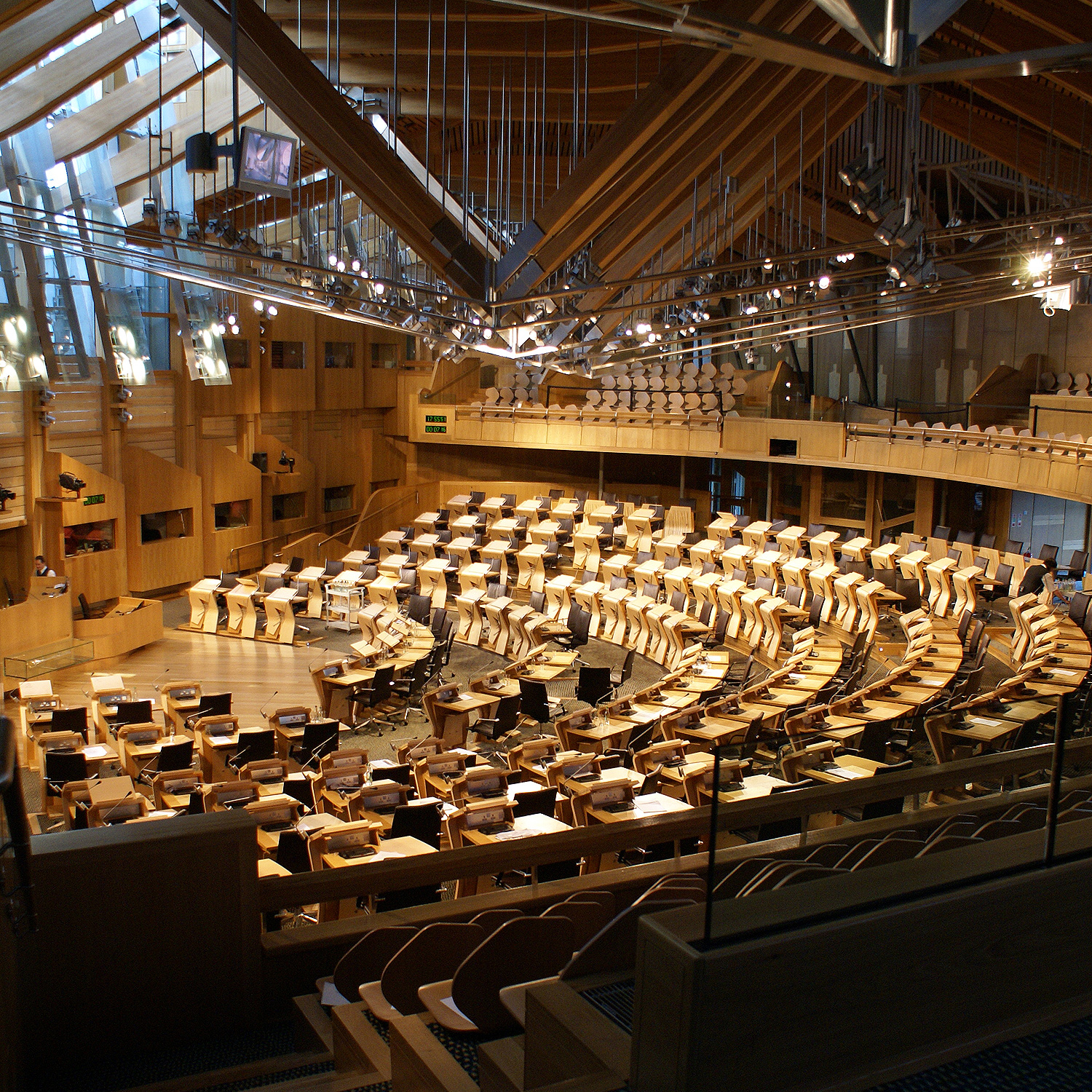
Scottish Parliament

The Scotland Act 1978 became law on 31 July 1978, requiring 40% of the Scottish electorate to support the formation of an assembly. Although 52% of those who voted supported an assembly, this amounted to 33% of the total electorate and so an assembly was not formed. In 1997 a referendum was held in Scotland on a Scottish parliament which was supported by 74.3% of Scots. In 1998 the Scotland Bill was introduced in the UK Parliament and became law as the Scotland Act 1998 later that year. The Scottish parliamentary elections were held in 1999 and were followed by the re-establishment of the Scottish parliament.

In Wales, a referendum on a Welsh assembly was held, also in 1997, and resulted in a 50.3% majority in favour. The Government of Wales Act was passed in the UK parliament in 1998 and the National Assembly for Wales was formed in 1999 in Cardiff. The National Assembly for Wales was renamed as the Senedd Cymru/Welsh Parliament, with the Presiding Officer, Elin Jones, saying that its renaming represented the increased powers and responsibilities of the Senedd.

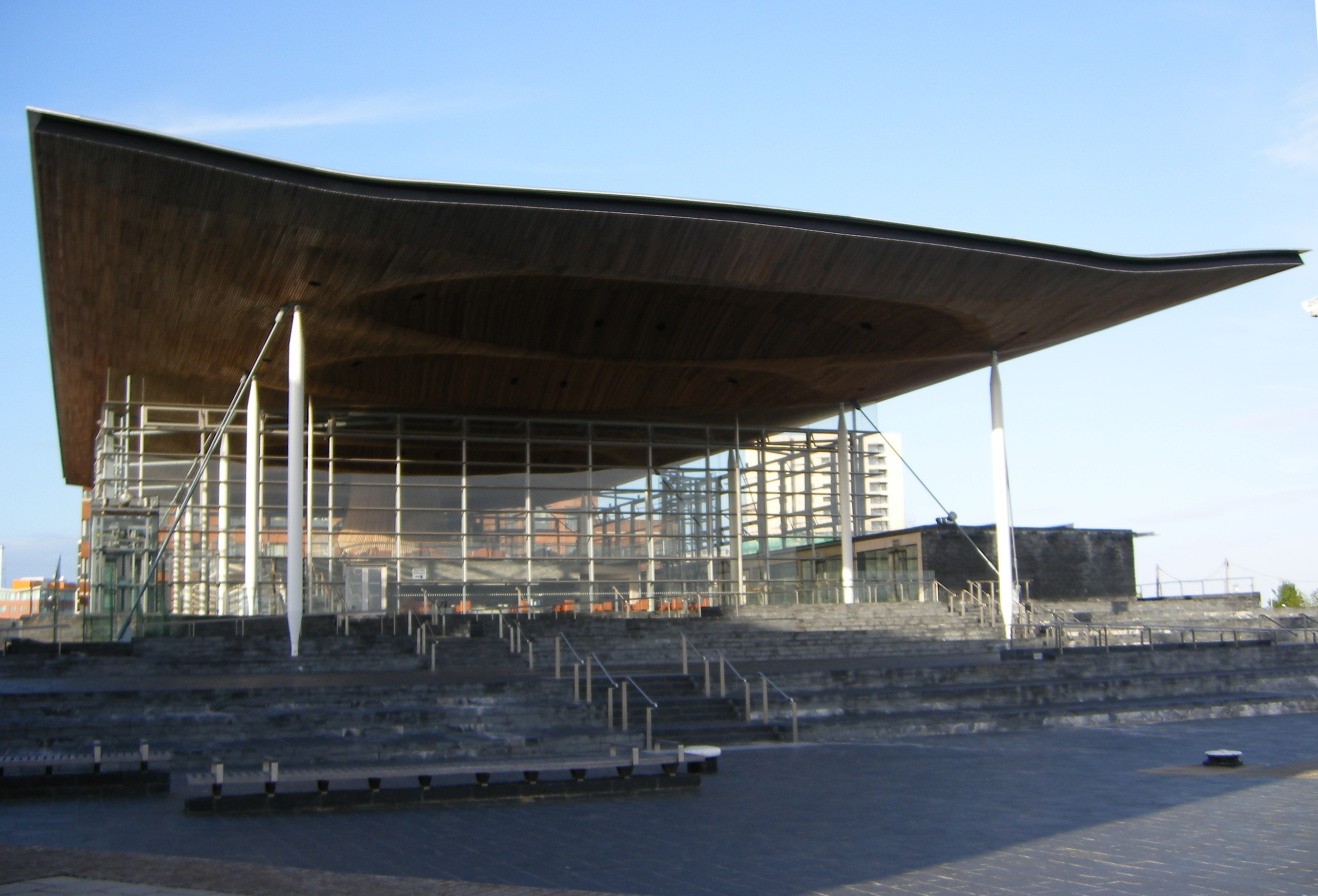
Senedd Cymru – Welsh Parliament

In 2014, Scotland voted to remain in the UK, though a plurality of Scots wanted greater autonomy within the UK. This culminated in the Scotland Act of 2016 which declared that Scotland's devolved institutions were permanent, and granted the Scottish Parliament and government powers over taxation and welfare.

The Wales Act 2017 defined the National Assembly and devolved institutions to be a permanent component of the UK constitution, and any abolition of such institutions would require a referendum. The act also changed the model of operation of the devolved institutions from a "conferred powers model" to a "reserved powers model". The Assembly was given the power to decide its own name and voting system of members.

=== Proposals for an English Parliament ===
There have been proposals for the establishment of a single Devolved English Parliament to govern the affairs of England as a whole. This has been supported by groups such as English Commonwealth, the English Democrats and Campaign for an English Parliament, as well as the Scottish National Party and Plaid Cymru who have both expressed support for greater autonomy for all four nations while ultimately striving for a dissolution of the Union. Without its own devolved Parliament, England continues to be governed and legislated for by the UK Government and UK Parliament which gives rise to the West Lothian question. The question concerns the fact that, on devolved matters, Scottish MPs continue to help make laws that apply to England alone, although no English MPs can make laws on those same matters for Scotland. Since the 2014 Scottish independence referendum there has been a wider debate about the UK adopting a federal system with each of the four Home Nations having its own, equal devolved legislatures and law-making powers.

In September 2011 it was announced that the British government was to set up a commission to examine the West Lothian question. In January 2012 it was announced that this six-member commission would be named the Commission on the consequences of devolution for the House of Commons, would be chaired by former Clerk of the House of Commons, Sir William McKay, and would have one member from each of the devolved countries. The McKay Commission reported in March 2013. Following the election of a Conservative majority government in the 2015 general election, new parliamentary procedures and a Legislative Grand Committee were enacted to bring it into effect. The measures were subsequently abolished in 2021.

== Federation proposals ==
=== 19th and 20th centuries ===
Federalism was proposed in the 1870s by Isaac Butt and his Home Rule party. Federalism was also proposed by Joseph Chamberlain in the mid-1880s. It gained significant support during the constitutional and home rule crisis in Ireland in particular.

A UK federation government was proposed in 1912 by Winston Churchill, Member of Parliament for Dundee, which also included proposals for English regions governed by a regional parliament as part of a UK federation. Potential areas included Lancashire, Yorkshire, the Midlands and London.

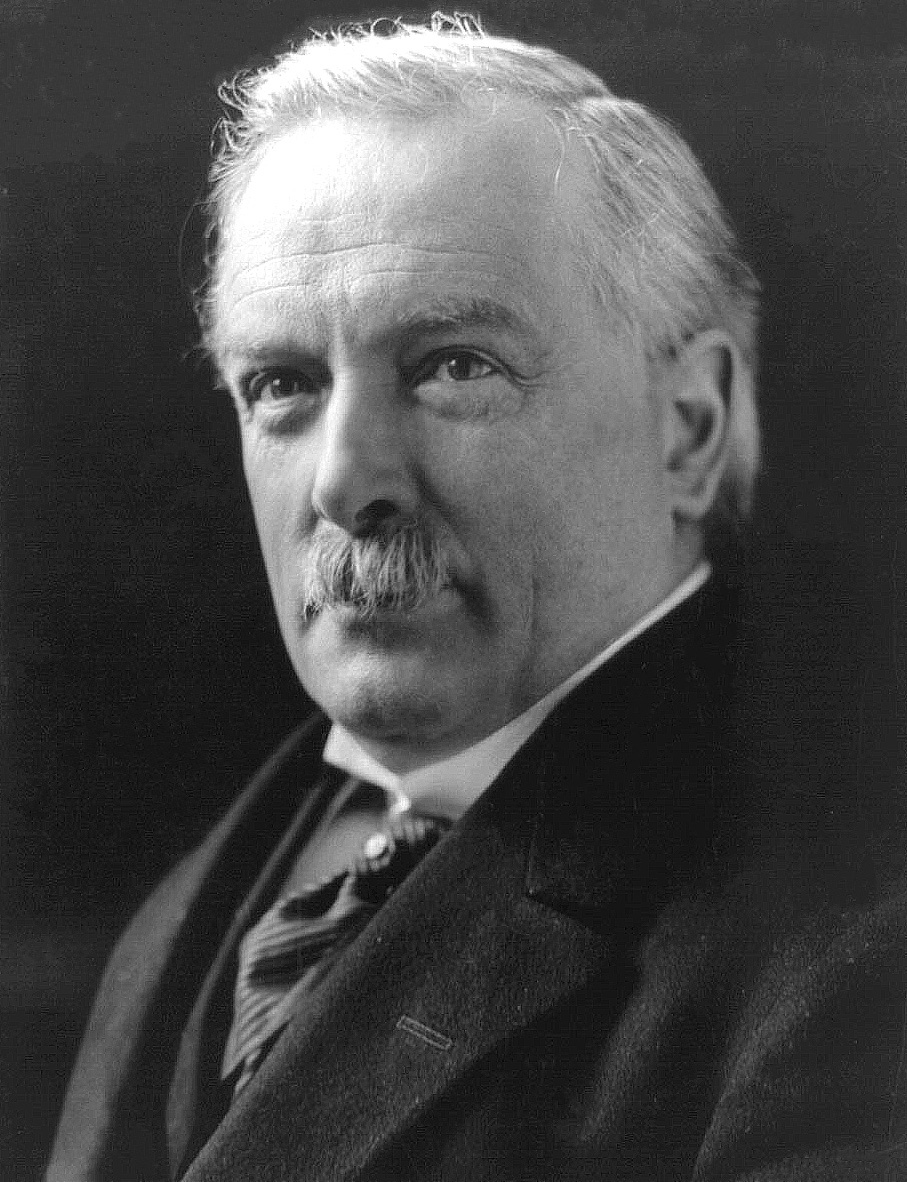
David Lloyd George

David Lloyd George campaigned for Welsh devolution, beginning with the devolution of the Church in Wales which finally came about in 1920. Lloyd George felt that disestablishment, land reform and other forms of Welsh devolution could only be achieved if Wales formed its own government within a federal imperial system. Lloyd George's Government of 1918 also gave considerable thought to a federal government to relieve tensions in Ireland, particularly in combination with conscription for the First World War.

In 1977, Tam Dalyell, then MP for West Lothian, raised the "West Lothian question" on the issue of an English parliament during a debate on devolution of powers to Scotland and Wales.

=== 21st century timeline ===
==== David Melding ====
In September 2013, Conservative MS for South Wales Central, David Melding produced a book for the Institute of Welsh Affairs (IWA) discussing federalism. He suggested that parliaments in a federal UK should all be sovereign and that a balance of powers between a central parliament and the national parliaments would emerge following a new "Act of Union". He suggests that disputes could be resolved in the Supreme Court.

==== Liberal Democrats ====
Since March 2014, the Liberal Democrats have been committed to a policy of UK federalism. Their proposal for a federal UK originally included:

- Transferring additional powers to the Senedd Cymru / Welsh Parliament to have equal devolution to the Scottish Parliament
- A need dependent equitable distribution of resources between different parts of the UK
- A Declaration of Rights document
- Election to the House of Commons via Single Transferable Vote
- Replacing the House of Lords with an upper house and a more democratic mandate

In 2021 the Liberal Democrats updated their stance on a federal UK with a policy motion and a background paper calling for regional assemblies throughout England whose powers would approach those of the Scottish Parliament, representing a near symmetric arrangement in which the regions of England would be constitutionally equivalent to Scotland, Wales and Northern Ireland as states of the federal union but allowing for a parallel "English National Chamber" for English-only affairs, England remaining as a single legal jurisdiction. The policy specifically calls for the House of Lords to be replaced by a federal Senate with representatives from the nations and/or regions and calls for significant fiscal decentralisation: a target of 50% of public spending to be controlled by the subnational governments. Party policy also retains the prior call for a Constitutional Convention with the aim of building a consensus for the drafting of a federal constitution.

==== Institute of Economic Affairs (IEA) ====
The think-tank IEA produced a report in 2015 that suggested that the UK should become a federal country. It concluded that responsibilities by and large should be transferred to Scotland and England, Wales and Northern Ireland or Scotland and Rest of UK. It suggested that federal government should have very few functions which would include defence, border control and foreign affairs.

==== Chuka Umunna ====
An English parliament as part of a federal UK was suggested by Labour politician Chuka Umunna in July 2015.

==== Constitutional Reform Group ====
The Constitutional Reform Group is a group made up of politicians from all parties. Its Steering Committee is composed of Robert Gascoyne-Cecil, 7th Marquess of Salisbury; Robert Rogers, Baron Lisvane; former First Minister of Wales Carwyn Jones; former first minister of Scotland Lord Jack McConnell; and Lord David Trimble, the first and former First Minister of Northern Ireland, among others. The group produced their first draft of a new Act of Union Bill in July 2016. An Act of Union Bill 2018 was subsequently introduced as a Private Members' Bill in the House of Lords on 9 October 2018.

On 24 April 2021, an "Act of Union Bill 2021" was published. This includes:

- The continued existence and sovereignty of a UK Parliament with exclusive legislative powers for central matters
- The continued existence of a Welsh Parliament, Scottish Parliament and Northern Irish Assembly
- The formation of an English Parliament OR Regional Devolution for England
- The abolition of powers of the UK parliament to intervene in the Scottish and Welsh Parliaments and Governments
- Each MP is referred to as either a Welsh MP, English MP, Scottish MP or Northern Ireland MP
- The abolition or reform of the House of Lords
- A scrutiny committee for all four parliaments in both options for the House of Lords. Each national parliament proposes their own committee member for the UK scrutiny committee

Central matters to include:

- Constitution: The Crown, the UK, Parliament, Scotland Act 1998 & 2016, Government of Wales Acts, Northern Ireland Act 1998, Ministers of the Crown
- Foreign Affairs: foreign affairs, international treaties and conventions, EU membership, NATO membership, European Economic Area, Defence
- Rights: Human rights
- Economic Affairs: Central bank functions, monetary policy, government borrowing, currency, regulation of financial services
- Taxation: central taxes
- Law and order: Supreme Court, national security
- Home affairs: nationality, immigration, extradition, emergency powers
- Public Service: The civil service, political parties

==== Proposed models ====
In April 2018, Isobel Lindsay, a board member of Scotland's economic and political think-tank, Common Weal, suggested the following two models:

1. The Four Nations proposal: A UK Federation composed of England, Wales, Scotland & Northern Ireland
2. Three Nations plus English Regions: A UK federation composed of Wales, Scotland, Northern Ireland & English regions
3. Council of the Isles: Building upon the British–Irish Council to form a Council of the Isles which could include Wales, Scotland, England, Northern Ireland and the independent Republic of Ireland. This could also allow an independent Scotland to be a part of this council.

England is by far the largest single unit in the United Kingdom by population (84%) and by area (54%) and thus contributes to the justification for a "Three Nations plus English regions" model.

==== The Federal Union and the Federal Trust ====
The Federal Union is a pressure group that supports a codified federal constitution for the United Kingdom, arguing that governance remains too centralised. In October 2018, Andrew Blick, of King's College London and the Federal Union, proposed a Federalist Constitution for the UK. He also suggests that a single English parliament would not be effective and that regional federalism of England would be more effective; and that the regions of England, created for statistical purposes, are included in one proposed model for a UK federation. The Federal Trust has also proposed a UK Federation as a potential option for the UK's constitutional future.

==== Unionists ====
In February 2020, political analyst John Curtice suggested that the UK's decision to leave the European Union, which was supported by a majority in England and Wales but not in Scotland and Northern Ireland, may have strengthened the Scottish independence movement and proved problematic for the Good Friday Agreement. As such, some people such as the former head of the Department for Exiting the European Union, Philip Rycroft, have proposed federalism as a way of ensuring the Union continues.

==== Jeremy Corbyn ====
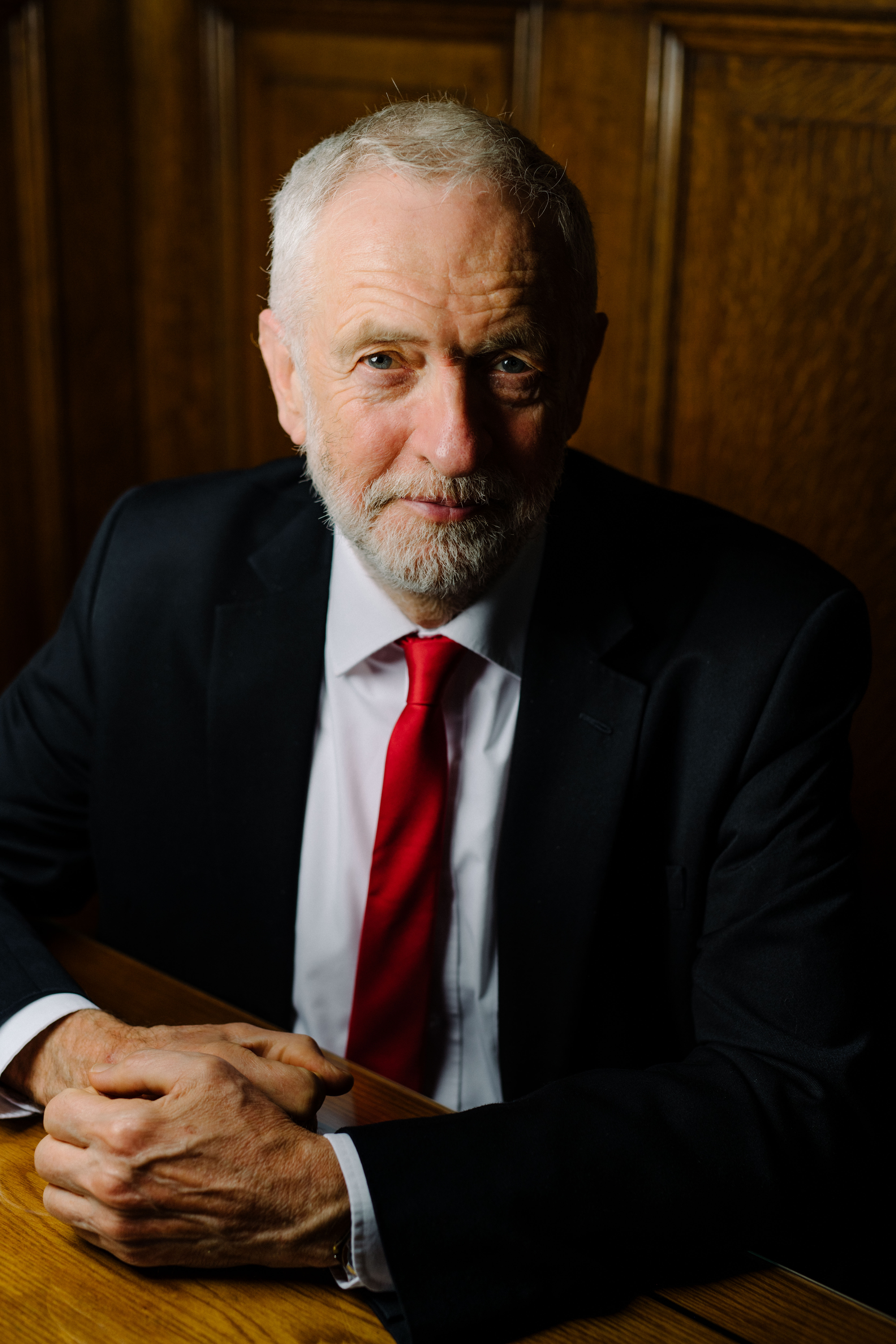
Jeremy Corbyn in 2019

A report commissioned by the UK Labour Party during the leadership of Jeremy Corbyn was published in February 2021. The report, titled Remaking the British State: For the many Not the few, proposed constitutional reform of the devolved governments of the UK and establishment of a federal UK system.

The report recommended the following:

- A UK constitutional convention supported by citizens' assemblies with reform options
- A codified constitution, also significantly reducing the powers of the monarch
- Replacing the House of Lords with a federal senate of nations & regions
- A council of the union including first ministers of England, Wales, Scotland and Northern Ireland and a prime minister of the UK
- Proportional representation in the House of Commons
- Permanent constitutional independence for the Scottish parliament, Senedd Cymru/Welsh Parliament and the Northern Irish executive
- Increased borrowing & policymaking powers for the Scottish Parliament (including social security, alcohol taxation, drugs policy & postgraduate immigration)
- Devolution of policymaking and financial powers such as borrowing to English regions and councils

==== Welsh Labour proposals ====
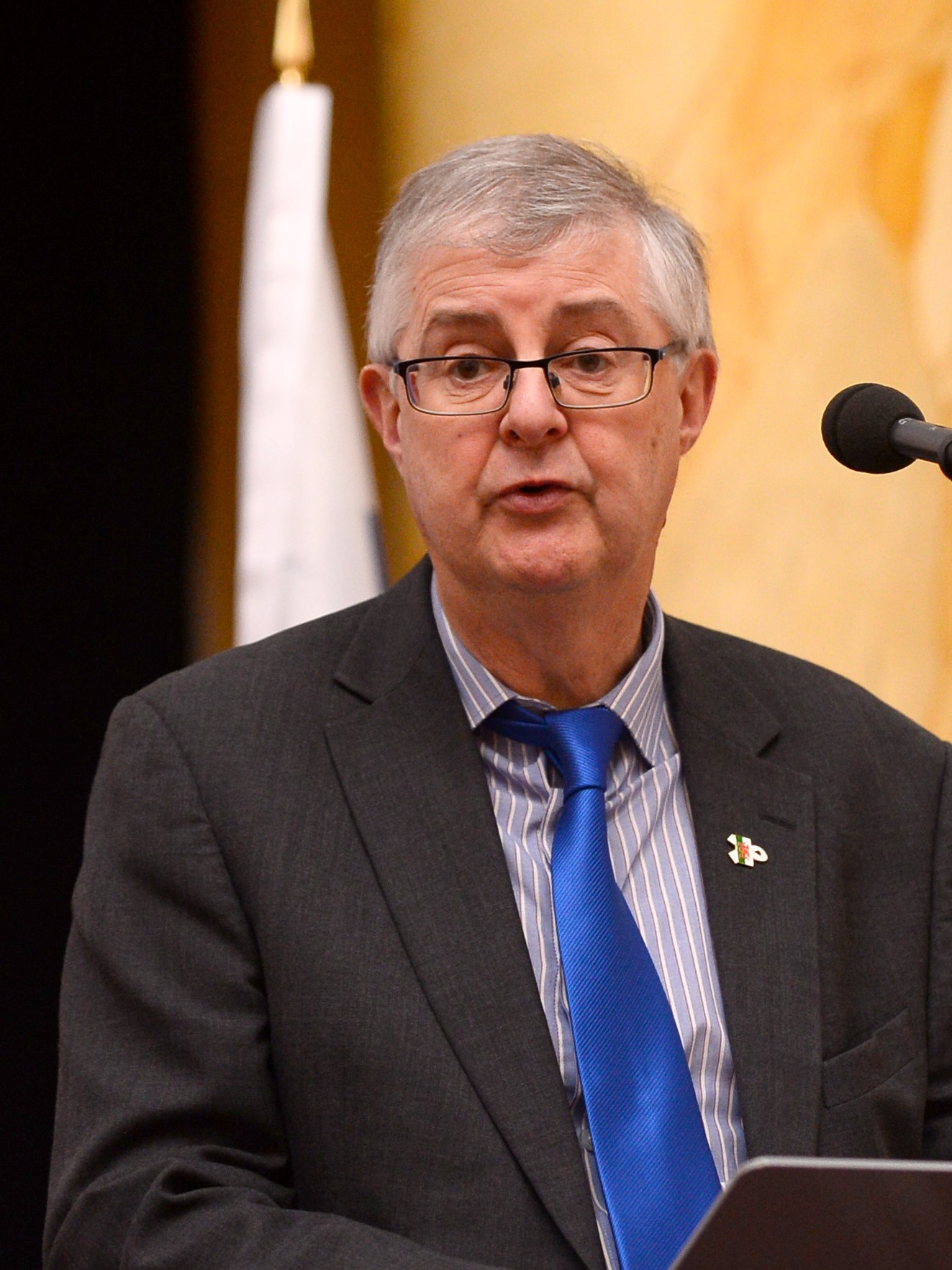
Mark Drakeford in 2017

The Welsh Labour Government produced a report update for the reformation of the United Kingdom in June 2021. This report summary outlined a proposed 20 key changes to devolution in the UK. This proposed reform of the structure of devolution for the countries of the UK would build a stronger and more durable UK, according to Mark Drakeford.

The Welsh Labour proposal for "far reaching federalism" are summarised as follows:

===== Principles =====
1. The UK becomes a voluntary union of 4 nations.
2. Devolution is permanent and cannot be undone without agreement from electorate.
3. Equalise devolution across nations, to become as devolved as possible.

===== Law-making =====
1. Each parliament/assembly in the UK decides its own size and how members are elected.
2. The UK Parliament should not legislate on devolved matters without consent.
3. A centralised source of funding for running costs of devolved parliaments/assembly.
4. Representation of devolved nations in the House of Commons.
5. House of Lords reformed to reflect the make-up of the United Kingdom & protects the constitution and devolution.

===== Inter-governmental relations =====
1. Governments must be treated as equals
2. Ministers are responsible and held to account for duties in their own country without interference from other governments.
3. The UK government does not fund other governments' responsibilities without consent.
4. Regular, organised inter-governmental co-operation for benefit of UK.
5. Devolved governments have a say in international relations and trade.
6. UK bodies that work for every country in the UK.
7. Continued impartiality of the civil service serving the Welsh, Scottish & UK governments, working with the Northern Ireland civil service.

===== Financial matters =====
1. Funding based on need. No UK funding outside these arrangements without consent.
2. Needs-based grant from the UK government to devolved nations (raised by devolved and local taxes and borrowing).
3. Formation of an independent public body overseeing funding across UK.
4. Each government determines and is held accountable for tax and spending priorities.

===== Justice =====
1. Justice and policing devolved to Wales (as it is in Scotland and Northern Ireland).
2. Supreme Court membership reflects the whole of the UK.

===== Constitution matters =====
1. A Constitutional Convention with UK wide membership considering UK governance and inter-governmental relationships.

==== Keir Starmer and Gordon Brown ====
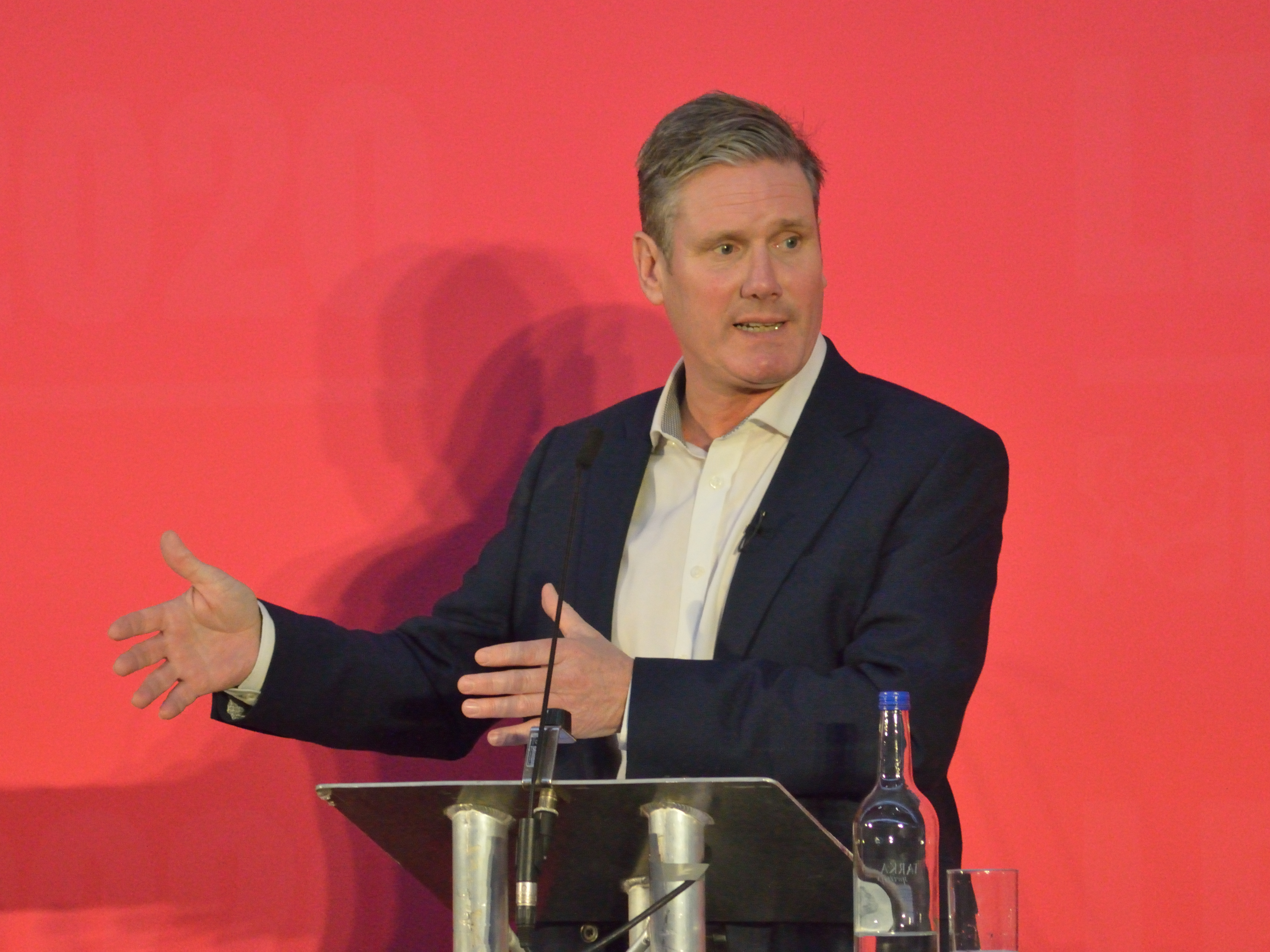
Keir Starmer, 2020 Labour Party leadership election hustings

Keir Starmer stated in January 2022 that a Labour government would pursue rapid constitutional reform, including further devolution of power. He also promised a "radical devolution of power" which would include a written constitution. More specific details in Starmer's radical devolvement or federalisation plans were said to be lacking. Starmer also tasked Gordon Brown with heading a "Constitution Commission" for prospective reform of the UK, a commission which would become active under a Labour government. Brown has suggested federalism as a viable option following Brexit and, according to Adam Tomkins, supported "a reformed Britain, a new federal settlement, and further powers for a supercharged Holyrood". Brown proposed:

- European powers transferred from the EU to the Scottish Parliament for agriculture, fisheries, environmental regulation and areas of employment and energy.
- £800 million transferred from the EU to Scotland as would be given with EU membership
- Scottish Parliament regional policy, take action to support its own industries.
- VAT rates set by Scottish Parliament
- Scottish Parliament negotiates with European countries on policies within its powers
- EU access for Scottish industries and universities for research and the Erasmus programme for students.
- Scotland guaranteed a place in the European Court of Human Rights or the EU Social Chapter
- Bank of England reformed as a Bank of England, Scotland, Wales and Northern Ireland with fully-staffed representation within Scotland.

In September 2022, Gordon Brown's plans were said to include; further devolution of taxation to Scotland, Wales, and England's regions; a new mechanism to "community groups" for the promotion of bills in parliament; constitutional guarantee of social and economic rights; replacement of the House of Lords by an upper house of nations and regions (previously cited in the party's 2015 and 2019 manifestos); minimum of three years' funding to local and devolved governments for longer-term planning. First minister of Wales, Mark Drakeford suggested that Gordon Brown's recommendations would ensure practical ways in which devolution could not be overruled.

===== New Britain report =====
In December 2022, a Labour report on the Commission on the UK's Future was published, titled "A New Britain: Renewing our Democracy and Rebuilding our Economy", the following proposals were made:

- New, statutory, formulation of the Sewel convention, which should be legally binding, providing similar constitutional codification as states and provinces in federal countries.
- A "solidarity clause" under which to ensure the commitment of all the governments in the UK to work together
- Establishment of a Council of the Nations and Regions to replace the Joint Ministerial Committees, which the report described as ineffective.
- A second chamber of Parliament, reforming the House of Lords and acting as an Assembly of the Nations and Regions

==== A League-Union of the Isles ====
In March 2022, Glyndwr Jones of the Institute of Welsh Affairs produced a document "A League-Union of the Isles" discussing constitutional options for the UK with a preface by former first minister of Wales Carwyn Jones. The author presents multiple potential constitutional options for the UK nations including: devolution, federalism, confederalism, confederal-federalism, sovereignty within the EU and independence. The author settles on confederal-federalism, a union of sovereign nations that stands between federalism and a confederation, with an agreed confederal treaty between national parliaments, which jointly form a "Council of the Isles". The proposed union would include the following:

- Rights of movement, residence and employment in any nation within the union
- Each nation would have its own legal jurisdiction in addition to a "Supreme Court of the Isles"
- A common currency and a central "Bank of the Isles"
- Each nation would have its own tax regimes and contribute a proportion of their GDP to the "Council of the Isles"
- Defence, foreign policy, internal trade, currency, large scale economics and "Isles affairs" governed by the "Council of the Isles"
- Each nation holds 4 seats at the UN general council and one collective seat at the UN Security Council

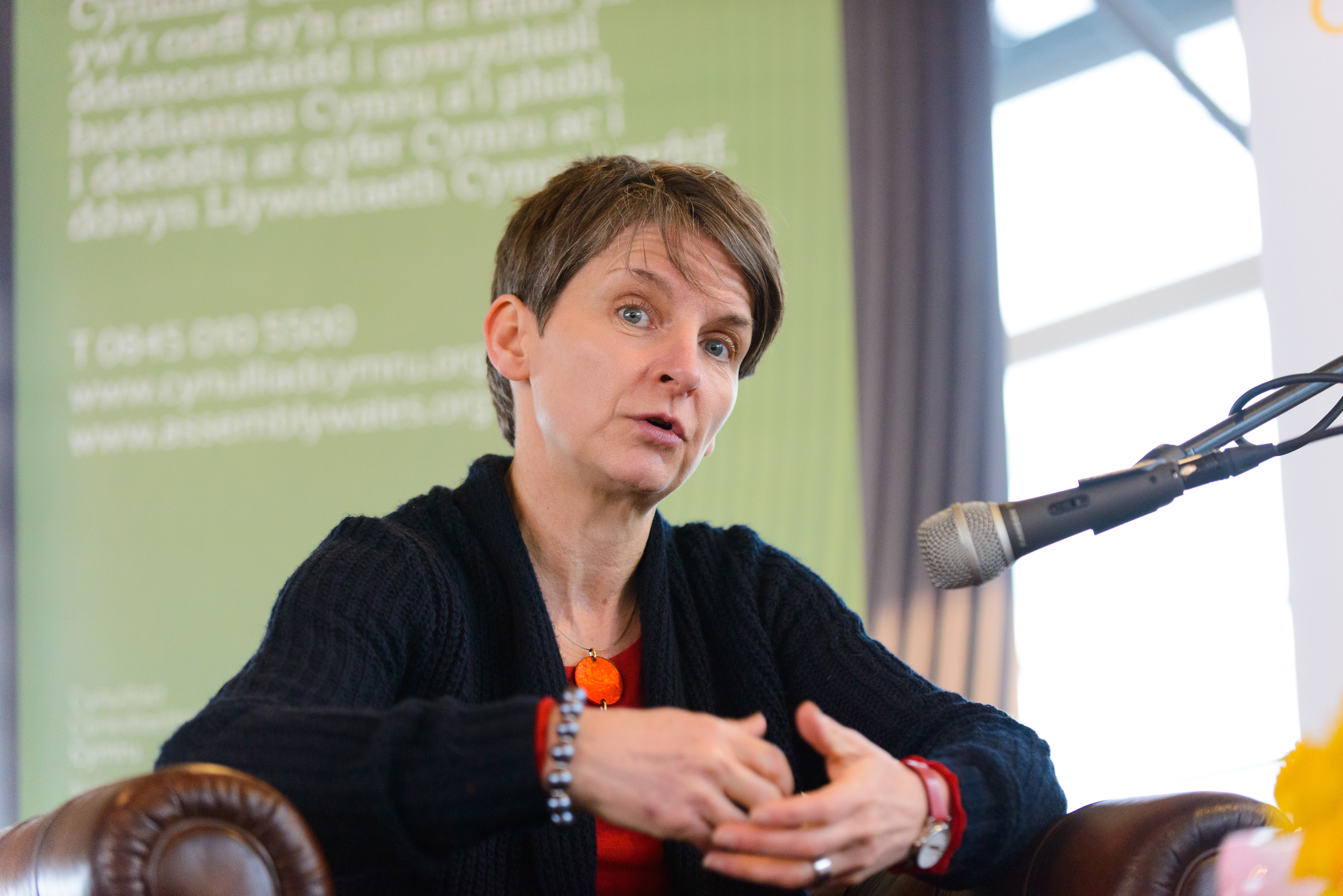
Laura McAllister in 2013

==== Independent Commission on the Constitutional Future of Wales ====
The Independent Commission on the Constitutional Future of Wales is an ongoing commission that will make recommendations about Wales' constitutional future. Having their first meeting on the 25th of November 2021, Professor Laura McAllister and Dr Rowan Williams are co-chairing the commission. Professor McAllister has stated that all options are on the table – including independence. This independent commission was established in 2022 by the Welsh Government and has two broad objectives which include consideration and development of options for reform of constitutional structures of the UK, and progressive principal options to strengthen Welsh democracy and deliver improvements for Wales.

In its interim report of December 2022, The Independent Commission on the Constitutional Future of Wales proposes the following as an option for a federal UK:

- The UK Parliament and Government's responsibility for the UK is separate to England
- Reform of the House of Lords
- Devolved financial responsibility for taxation
- Optional devolved financial responsibility for welfare

== Confederation proposals ==
A confederation has also been proposed as a related concept of constitutional reform. Unlike in a federation where the United Kingdom remains a sovereign state, a confederation would involve the countries of the United Kingdom becoming separate sovereign states that pool certain key resources within a central authority. Under the system, the central authority exists with the consensus of the constituent countries which would maintain a right to secession if they wish.

According to the Institute of Welsh Affairs, the concept of a confederal UK may include the following:

1. The individual sovereignty of England, Northern Ireland, Scotland and Wales.
2. The national parliament of each country represented in a Confederal Assembly where matters such as freedom of movement, residence, employment in neighbouring countries would be subject to negotiation.
3. Joint budgetary funds raised annually and contributed by each member country as an agreed proportion of GDP. Each country operates their own tax systems and their own bank, but together may agree on a common currency.
4. The confederation is defined by an agreed treaty which includes references to e.g. internal trade, currency, defence, foreign relations.
5. Each decision made by the confederal assembly must be individually implemented in each country's government.
6. Each country has independent legal jurisdictions and a supreme court.

The independent Constitution Commission on the Constitutional Future of Wales identified two questions on a confederal union in the case of Welsh independence:

"What evidence is there that England and/or other parts of the UK would join in any free association or confederal arrangements with Wales which would constrain their own freedom of action?

If other parts of the UK were unwilling to enter into shared governance arrangements with an independent Wales, how would cross border matters be managed?"

=== History ===
As early as 1892, the concept of a "Britannic Confederation" has been raised which mentioned the possibility of England, Ireland, Scotland and Wales entering such a confederation as separate states.

=== Academic analysis ===
Gerald Holtham, Hodge Professor of Regional Economy at Cardiff Metropolitan University, also outlined his support for a confederal UK in an article for the think tank Compass.

Prof Jim Gallagher, of the Institute of Legal and Constitutional Research at the University of St Andrews, has produced a paper discussing his support for a confederate UK. Gallagher was the UK government's most senior adviser on devolution and constitutional matters. He worked on the number 10 policy unit under Gordon Brown.

In 2019, Nigel Biggar, Regius Professor of Moral and Pastoral Theology, University of Oxford, suggested it was time to form a British Isles confederation, also replacing the House of Lords with a senate elected by the assemblies/parliaments of constituent countries.

==== A League-Union of the Isles ====
In March 2022, Glyndwr Jones of the Institute of Welsh affairs produced a document "A League-Union of the Isles" discussing constitutional options for the UK with a preface by former first minister of Wales Carwyn Jones. The author presents multiple potential constitutional options for the UK/UK nations including: devolution, federalism, confederalism, confederal-federalism, sovereignty within the EU and independence. The author settles on confederal-federalism, a union of sovereign nations that stands between federalism and a confederation, with an agreed confederal treaty between national parliaments, which jointly form a "Council of the Isles". The proposed union would include the following:

- Rights of movement, residence and employment in any nation within the union
- Each nation would have its own legal jurisdiction in addition to a "Supreme Court of the Isles"
- A common currency and a central "Bank of the Isles"
- Each nation would have its own tax regimes and contribute a proportion of their GDP to the "Council of the Isles"
- Defence, foreign policy, internal trade, currency, large scale economics and "Isles affairs" governed by the "Council of the Isles"
- Each nation holds an individual seat at the UN general council, but one collective seat at the UN Security Council

=== By politicians ===
Former Plaid Cymru leader Gwynfor Evans, advocated for a "Britannic Confederation" that included Wales, and produced a booklet including this proposal in 1988.

John Osmond, Welsh political reporter said in 2014 that the constitutional ideas proposed by former prime minister Gordon Brown and former First Minister of Wales Carwyn Jones were moving towards a confederation. Jones was reportedly a supporter of a confederal system and worked with Gordon Brown on his recommendations for constitutional reform of the UK. Brown's recommendations did not explicitly propose a confederal model.

Following the 2015 UK general election, then leader of Plaid Cymru, Leanne Wood adapted the party's constitutional stance back to the traditional party position of an independent Wales within a UK confederation.

In 2019, Plaid Cymru leader Adam Price also advocated for a "Britannic Confederation between Wales, Scotland and England", similarly to the Benelux union between Belgium, Netherlands and Luxembourg. Price said “I would argue that by pooling their powers within both Benelux and the European Union, the three countries have enlarged and strengthened their sovereignty. By operating closely together they have obtained greater flexibility and reach in the exercise of national power, grown their economies, and enhanced their presence on the world stage.”

In 2021, in a House of Lords Constitution Committee, "Inquiry into the Future Governance of the UK", Dr Paul Anderson suggested that further research was merited for a federal or confederal UK. He noted that this may, "contrary to the current dominant opinion among pro-Union political elites, create an even looser union". He also suggested that the SNP's campaign for independence prior to the 2014 independence referendum included "hallmarks" of a confederal UK.

In 2022, Dafydd Wigley, former Plaid Cymru MP and member of the House of Lords advocated for a "Britannic Confederation", "in which sovereignty of the three nations and the Province is acknowledged, but they pool their sovereignty for certain purposes—for example, the recognition of the Queen as the head of a Britannic confederation. Plaid Cymru and the SNP currently accept the monarchy as the Head of State, recognising a Britannic dimension to our identity as well as our own national identity." "Secondly, there might be an acceptance of sterling as the currency and a reconstituted Bank of England acting as a central bank for a confederation. Thirdly, there is scope for defence co-operation. The SNP supports an independent Scotland being part of NATO, though this is obviously complicated by the question of nuclear weapons. There is surely a pragmatic solution to enable defence co-operation.”

In 2023, First Minister of Wales Mark Drakeford said that in reality, “sovereignty exists in four different places”. He added, “What we should do is think of a United Kingdom in which sovereignty rests in Scotland, Wales, Northern Ireland, and then we choose voluntarily to pool that sovereignty back for certain important key shared purposes.”

=== Northern Ireland ===
Professor Brendan O'Leary of the London School of Economics has noted that an element of a confederacy already exists between the Republic of Ireland and UK's Northern Ireland. Following the Good Friday Agreement of 1998, the North/South Ministerial Council (of the island of Ireland) was established which is responsible for 12 policy areas.

== Suggested potential benefits ==
A report by The Federal Trust suggested the following potential benefits of a federal UK:

- Constitution for UK level and sub-UK level identity
- Constitutionally form states from the devolved administrations. Stops undermining from UK government
- Consistent democratic governance across the UK
- Addressing the "English Question"
- Potential to avoid economic, financial, cultural centralisation and concentration in London
- Identify powers appropriate to be used at a sub-UK level and Westminster
- Clarification of the status of tiers of government below UK government
- Needs-based redistribution at a federal level, replacing the Barnett formula & resolving the UK and devolved government tensions
- Resolving dilemma of the status of House of Lords

== Political party positions ==
Members of the UK Labour Party, including their former leader Keir Starmer, have supported federalism, but the UK-wide party have not made a commitment. The Liberal Democrats are the only mainstream political party to have formally adopted a policy for a federal United Kingdom which outlines the structure of the proposed federation in line with the "Three Nations plus English Regions" model. Other political parties prefer the status quo or to increase autonomy further than federalism via independence.

=== UK parties ===
- Liberal Democrats

=== Scottish parties ===
- Scottish Labour
- Scottish Liberal Democrats

=== Welsh parties ===
- Welsh Labour
- Welsh Liberal Democrats

=== English regional parties ===
- Mebyon Kernow: Support a Cornish Assembly.
- Yorkshire Party: Supports a Regional Parliament.

== See also ==
- 1997 Scottish devolution referendum – Measure creating a devolved Scottish Parliament
- 1997 Welsh devolution referendum – Pre-legislative referendum in Wales
- 1998 Greater London Authority referendum – Referendum held in Greater London on 7 May 1998
- 2011 Welsh devolution referendum
- Asymmetric federalism – Imbalance of powers as between members
- Benelux – Western European politico-economic union
- British–Irish Council – Intergovernmental organisation
- Constitutional reform in the United Kingdom – Change to the system of governance in the United Kingdom
- Devolution in the United Kingdom – Transfer of powers to parts of the UK
- European Union – Supranational political and economic union
- Historic counties of England – Category of areas of England
- Historical and alternative regions of England – Sub-national divisions of England
- Imperial Federation – Proposed unification of the British Empire
- Nordic Council – Body for cooperation of Nordic countries
- Regions of England – Highest tier of sub-national division in England
- Scottish devolution – Transfer of powers to Scotland
- Union State – Supranational union of Belarus and Russia
- Unionism in the United Kingdom – Support for continued unity of the UK
