= List of think tanks in Wales =

This is a list of think tanks in Wales.

== A–I ==
- The Bevan Foundation
- Centre for Welsh Studies
- Gorwel
- Institute of Welsh Affairs

== J–Z ==
- Morgan Academy, Swansea University
- Nova Cambria
- Public Policy Institute for Wales (former)
- Wales Governance Centre
- WISERD - Wales Institute of Social and Economic Research, Data and Methods
- Welsh Centre for International Affairs
- Wales Centre for Public Policy

== See also ==
- List of think tanks in the United Kingdom
- Advocacy groups
- List of think tanks
- Politics of Wales
