= Wales Governance Centre =

Welsh think tank founded in 1999

- Canolfan Llywodraethiant Cymru
- Formation: 1999; 27 years ago
- Founder: Barry Jones (director until 2014)
- Founded at: Cardiff, Wales
- Legal status: Academic institution
- Purpose: Undertaking research into the law, government, politics & public finances of Wales
- Location(s): North Road, Cardiff, Wales; CF10 5EZ
- Region served: Wales
- Official language: English and Welsh
- Director: Richard Wyn Jones (since 2009)
- Parent organization: Cardiff University
- Affiliations: Economic and Social Research Council (ESRC)
- Website: www.cardiff.ac.uk/wales-governance-centre

The Wales Governance Centre (WGC) (Welsh: Canolfan Llywodraethiant Cymru) is a research centre and think-tank based Cardiff, Wales, which specialises in research into the law, politics, government and political economy of Wales, as well the wider territorial governance of the UK and Europe. It was established shortly after the 1997 Welsh devolution referendum, and was founded by Barry Jones in 1999. Its current director is Professor Richard Wyn Jones, and it is a part of Cardiff University.

== History ==
The centre was established following the 1997 Welsh devolution referendum and during the debate about implementing the programme of devolution in Wales.

The Centre produces the nationally reported coverage of Welsh politics of the Elections in Wales Etholiadau yng Nghymru blog written by Professor Roger Awan-Scully.

In 2019 it established a new branch, the Wales Fiscal Analysis, to focus on "authoritative and independent research" into the public finances, taxation and public expenditures of Wales.

== Funding ==
The WGC funded by Cardiff University through Research Councils UK and the European Research Council.

The centre has worked with a number of other organisations on jointly funded projects including the Public Policy Institute for Wales, the Institute of Welsh Affairs, the Welsh Centre for International Affairs, UK in a Changing Europe, University College London, the Electoral Reform Society Cymru, the Rowntree Charitable Trust and the Nuffield Foundation.

== Notable people ==
A number of academics from across Wales are currently, or have previously been involved with the institute.

- Professor Richard Wyn Jones
- Professor Roger Awan-Scully
- Professor Laura McAllister

== Leadership ==
Directors

- Professor Richard Wyn Jones (2014–present)
- Barry Jones (1999–2014)

== See also ==
- List of UK think tanks
- List of Welsh think tanks
