= Armand Duka =

Head of the Albanian Football Association

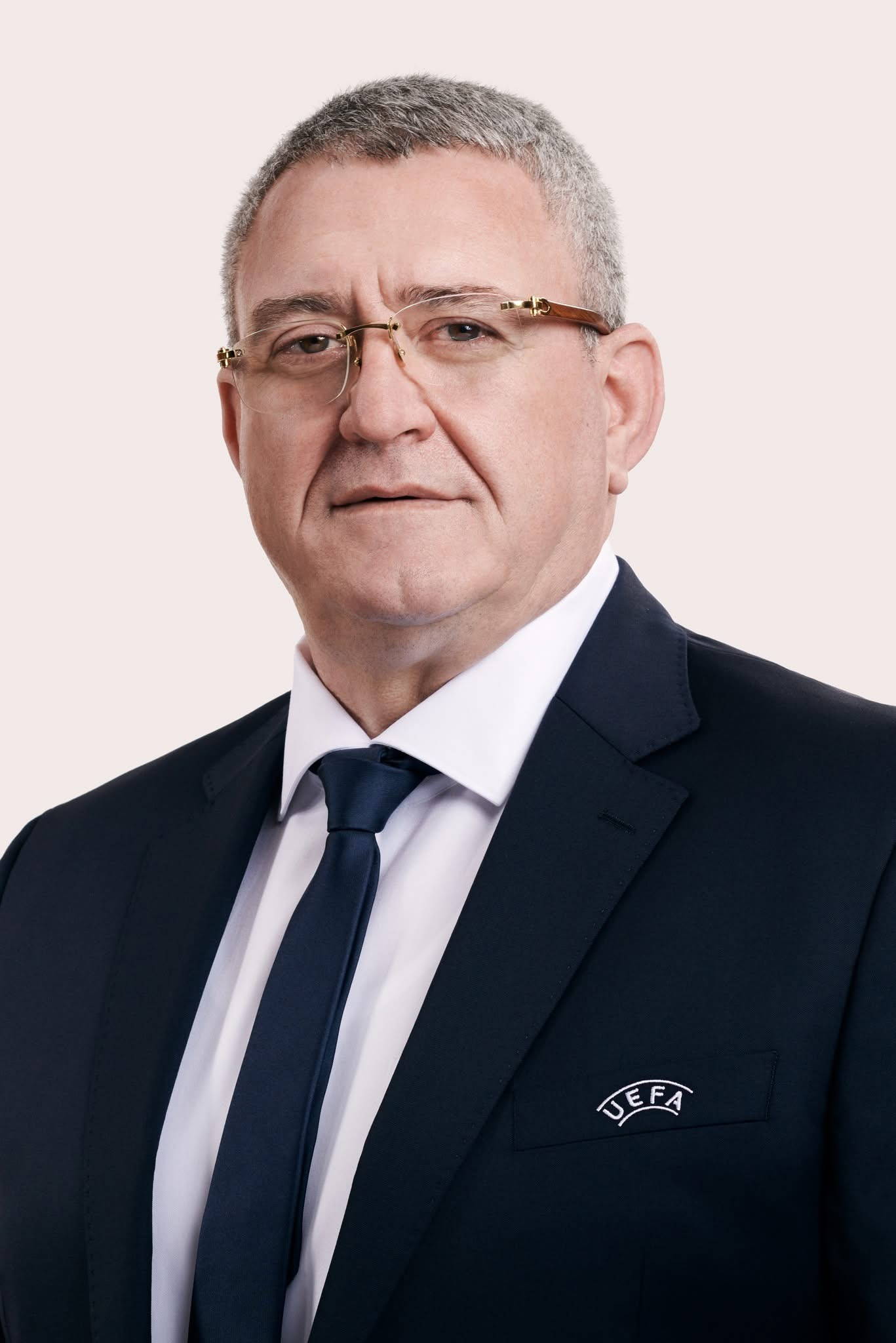

UEFA Vice President
- Incumbent
- Assumed office 26 September 2023 Serving with Zbigniew Boniek, David Gill, Gabriele Gravina and Laura McAllister
- President: Aleksander Čeferin
- Vice President: Karl-Erik Nilsson (as first vice-president)

Member of the UEFA Executive Committee
- In office 7 February 2019 – 26 September 2023
- President: Aleksander Čeferin
- Vice President: Karl-Erik Nilsson

9th President of the Albanian Football Federation
- Incumbent
- Assumed office 1 March 2002
- Preceded by: Miço Papadhopulli

Personal details
- Born: 7 October 1962 (age 64) Shijak, PR Albania
- Education: University of Tirana
- Occupation: Football executive
- Website: https://armanduka.com/

Armand Duka (born 7 October 1962) is an Albanian businessman and football administrator. He has been president of the Albanian Football Federation (FShF) since 2002. He is also a UEFA Vice-president since 2023 and a member of the FIFA Member Associations Committee since 2025.

== Early life and education ==
Duka was born on 7 October 1962 in Shijak, Albania. He studied at the University of Tirana from 1981 to 1986 and earned a degree in industrial economics.

== Business career ==
After university, Duka worked as an economist for state companies in Burrel and Durrës between 1986 and 1991. After the end of communism in Albania, he started his own businesses. In 1993 he founded AIBA, a company that produces and sells livestock products. He later founded Gootech Electronic, which sells household appliances, and Ecomarket, a food distribution company.

=== Football administrator ===
==== KF Erzeni Shijak ====
Duka's first involvement in football was as an owner of his hometown club KF Erzeni in the late 1990s.

==== President FShF ====
Duka was first elected president of FShF on 1 March 2002. He has subsequently been reelected in 2006, 2010, 2014, 2018 and 2022.

UEFA roles

Duka was elected to the UEFA Executive Committee for a four-year term on 7 February 2019 at the UEFA Congress in Rome. He was re-elected to the executive committee at the 47th UEFA Congress in Lisbon in April 2023, receiving 45 of 55 votes and coming first among the candidates.

On 26 September 2023, the UEFA Executive Committee elected Duka as one of UEFA's vice presidents, making him the first Albanian to hold that office. He now serves alongside Jesper Møller Christensen, Hans-Joachim Watzke, Gabriele Gravina and Laura McAllister under President Aleksander Čeferin.

FIFA roles

Duka has also held several positions at FIFA. He was a member of the FIFA Associations Committee from 2008 to 2012, and of the FIFA Confederations Cup Organising Committee from 2012 to 2017. In October 2025, he was elected to the FIFA Member Associations Committee for a four-year term.
