= David Gill (football executive) =

British football executive

David Gill CBE
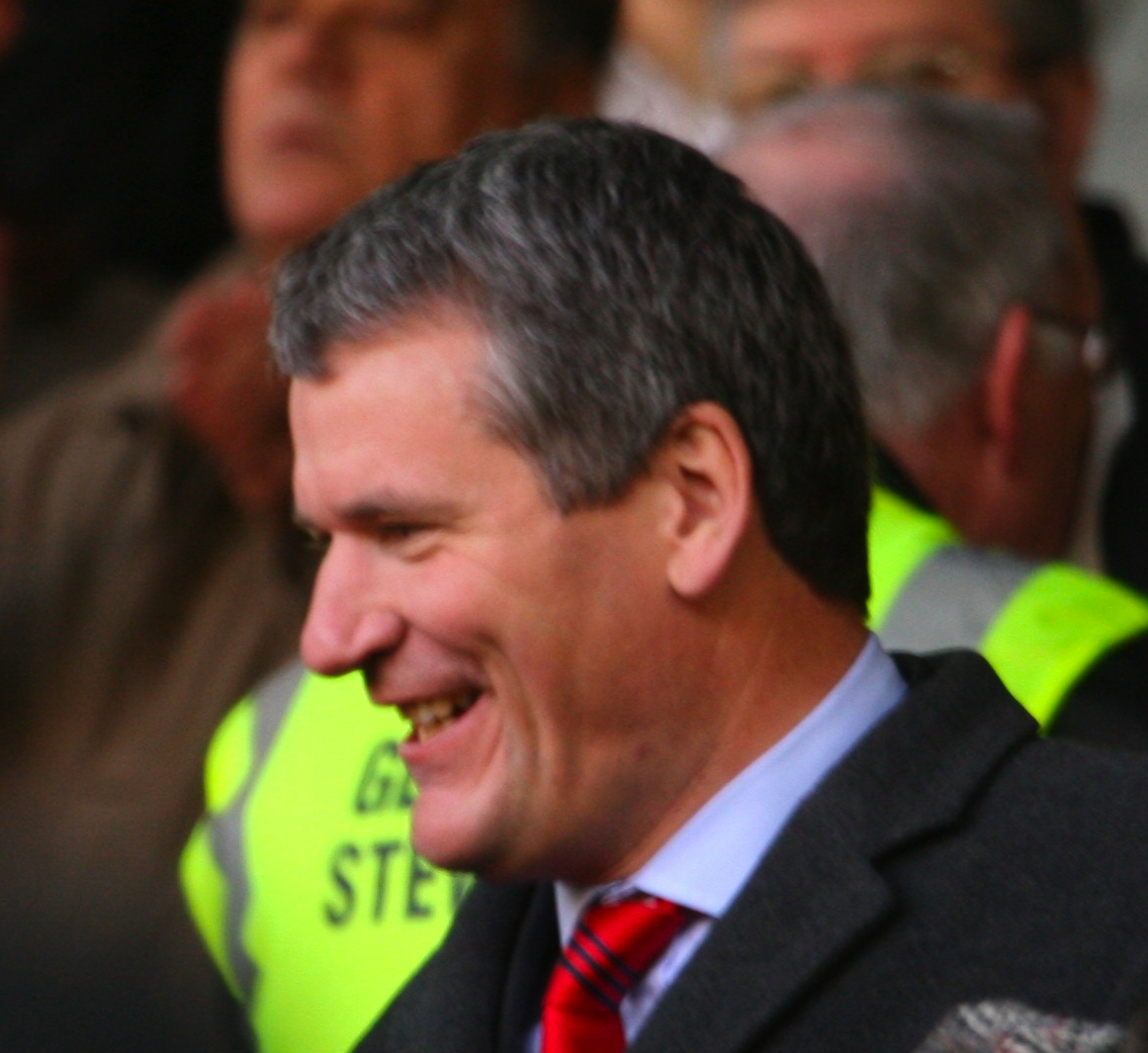
- Gill in 2006

Vice President of UEFA
- In office 24 May 2013 – 3 April 2025 Serving with Zbigniew Boniek, Armand Duka, Gabriele Gravina and Laura McAllister
- President: Aleksander Čeferin
- Vice President: Karl-Erik Nilsson (as first vice-president)

Chairman of The Football Association
- Acting; 28 January 2016 – 4 September 2016
- President: The Prince of Wales
- Preceded by: Greg Dyke
- Succeeded by: Greg Clarke

Vice-President of FIFA
- In office 24 March 2015 – 7 February 2019
- President: Sepp Blatter; Issa Hayatou (acting); Gianni Infantino
- Preceded by: Jim Boyce
- Succeeded by: Greg Clarke

Personal details
- Born: David Alan Gill; 5 August 1957 (age 69) Reading, Berkshire, United Kingdom
- Children: 3, including Oliver
- Education: University of Birmingham
- Occupation: Football executive

David Alan Gill CBE (born 5 August 1957) is a British football executive, formerly chief executive of Manchester United and a vice-chairman of The Football Association. He served as vice-chairman of the G-14 management committee until the G-14 was disbanded. He sat on the UEFA Executive Committee as of 2013. Gill was elected as a FIFA vice-president sitting on the FIFA Council in 2015; rejecting this position in protest at Sepp Blatter until Blatter announced his resignation as FIFA president, following the 2015 FIFA corruption case.

== Career ==
Born and raised in Reading, Berkshire, Gill studied at the University of Birmingham (BCom Industrial, Economic and Business Studies, 1978), becoming a chartered accountant with Price Waterhouse in 1981. After a two-year spell in San Francisco, he left the firm in 1986 to join BOC in its corporate finance department, and then Avis in 1990. At Avis, he was responsible for the disposal of the European leasing business to GE Capital for US$1 billion in August 1992. Subsequently, he was finance director at Proudfoot, the worldwide management consulting business, then quoted on the London Stock Exchange, and then at First Choice Holidays, the third largest UK tour operator, before joining Manchester United in 1997.

=== Manchester United ===
Gill joined Manchester United in 1997 as finance director. In August 2000, he was promoted to deputy chief executive whilst retaining his responsibilities as finance director. In July 2001, Nick Humby was appointed finance director of Manchester United, so Gill was promoted again this time to the title of Group Chief operating officer, allowing him to concentrate on managing the day-to-day operations of the business (including sponsorship & marketing, business development, financial services, conference & catering, ticketing & membership and group property).

In September 2003, after the departure of previous chief executive Peter Kenyon to Chelsea, Gill was promoted to chief executive of Manchester United. In 2005, he was appointed chief executive of the private limited company, Manchester United Ltd, that succeeded Manchester United PLC after the takeover by Malcolm Glazer.

Gill was also vice-chairman of the management committee of the now defunct G-14, an organisation of leading European football clubs. However, in September 2009, he was elected to a two-year place on the board of the European Club Association, the organisation created to replace the G-14.

On 20 February 2013, Manchester United announced that Gill would leave his post as chief executive in the summer of 2013, but that he would remain on the board as a director. He was replaced by the executive vice-chairman Ed Woodward.

=== The Football Association ===
On 2 June 2006, Gill was elected onto the board of The Football Association, replacing Arsenal vice-chairman David Dein. Gill said he was delighted to be working with the other board members of The Football Association. One of the first issues he had to deal with was the "club-vs.-country" row over Wayne Rooney's foot at the 2006 FIFA World Cup.

Questions were raised by Liverpool manager Rafael Benítez about a potential conflict of interest between Gill's roles with Manchester United and the FA. However, Gill dismissed the Spaniard's concerns, saying that he had been elected by the other Premier League chief executives.

In October 2012, Gill was appointed vice-chairman of the Football Association, replacing Dave Richards.

In June 2014, Gill walked out of a FIFA meeting in Brazil in protest at FIFA President Sepp Blatter, after he had labelled the British media as "racist", following serious corruption revelations published in The Sunday Times regarding the World Cup bids for Russia in 2018 and Qatar in 2022. Gill, along with a number of other European football executives, called for Blatter to resign and not to stand for a fifth term in 2015. Gill said Blatter's behaviour was "totally unacceptable".

=== UEFA ===
In May 2013, Gill was elected to the UEFA Executive Committee at the 2013 UEFA Congress in London, where 53 member associations voted for candidates to fill eight seats.

=== FIFA ===
In March 2015, Gill was elected as Britain's FIFA Vice-President, replacing Northern Ireland's Jim Boyce, sitting on the FIFA Council for a 4-year term.

Following the indictments in the United States of nine high-ranking FIFA officials and five corporate executives on charges including racketeering, wire fraud, and money laundering in May 2015, Gill threatened to resign his newly elected FIFA role if Sepp Blatter was re-elected as FIFA President or did not stand down. Blatter won re-election for a fifth term, and Gill immediately rejected his role as a FIFA Vice-President and a member of the Executive Committee in protest at Blatter's regime. "I simply do not see how there will be change for the good of world football while Mr Blatter remains in post" Gill stated. On 2 June, four days after FIFA's 65th FIFA Congress, Blatter abruptly announced he would be resigning, allowing Gill to "reconsider" his position as he had not yet formalised his resignation.

== Honours ==
Gill was appointed Commander of the Order of the British Empire (CBE) in the 2019 Birthday Honours for services to football.

== Personal life ==
Gill has two sons, Adam and Oliver, and a daughter, Jessica. Oliver signed a professional contract with Manchester United in July 2009.
