= WCPP =

WCPP may refer to:

- Wales Centre for Public Policy, an independent policy research institution based in Cardiff, Wales
- Wasm C++ (WebAssembly C Plus Plus)
- Western Cape Provincial Parliament
- WCPP-LP, a low-power radio station (102.1 FM) licensed to serve Ironwood, Michigan, United States
- WWKL (FM), a radio station (106.7 FM) licensed to serve Hershey, Pennsylvania, United States, which held the call sign WCPP from 2004 to 2005
