= Gabriele Gravina =

Italian sport director

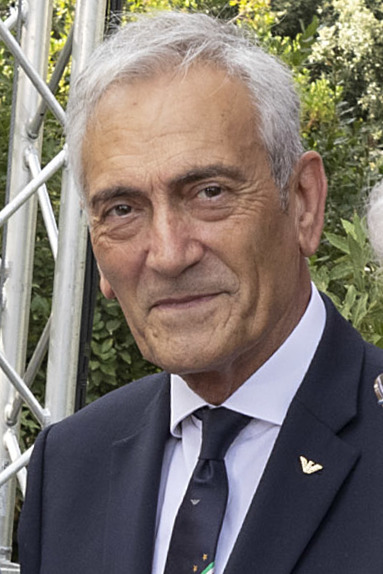
- Gravina in 2021

First Vice President of UEFA
- Incumbent
- Assumed office 3 April 2025
- President: Aleksander Čeferin
- Preceded by: Karl-Erik Nilsson (as first vice-president)

UEFA Vice President
- Incumbent
- Assumed office 21 April 2021 Serving with Zbigniew Boniek, Armand Duka, David Gill and Laura McAllister
- President: Aleksander Čeferin
- Vice President: Karl-Erik Nilsson (as first vice-president)

President of FIGC
- In office 22 October 2018 – 22 June 2026
- Preceded by: Roberto Fabbricini
- Succeeded by: Giovanni Malagò

Personal details
- Born: 5 October 1953 (age 73) Castellaneta, Apulia, Italy
- Occupation: Football administrator

Gabriele Gravina Grande Ufficiale OMRI (born 5 October 1953) is an Italian sports administrator. He has served as UEFA Vice President since 2021 and its First Vice President since 2025. From 2018 to 2026, he served as president of the Italian Football Federation.

== Biography ==
Originally from Castellaneta, Gravina resides in Sulmona, Abruzzo. He has a degree in Law. He has been an honorary citizen of Castel di Sangro since 14 December 2018.

== Career ==
=== President of Lega Pro ===
On 22 December 2015, Gravina was elected president of the Lega Italiana Calcio Professionistico with 31 votes against Raffaele Pagnozzi and Paolo Marcheschi with 13 and 7 votes respectively, thus succeeding Mario Macalli. He was reelected as president on 15 November 2016, with 55 votes, while his opponent Alessandro Barilli received only 3.

=== FIGC and UEFA ===
Gravina resigned as president of Lega Pro on 16 October 2018, and was elected president of the Italian Football Federation on 22 October with 97.2% of the votes. On 11 April 2019, he received the La Moda Veste la Pace Award from the European Parliament in Brussels for the activities to combat racism in football carried out during his term as President of the Italian Football Federation.

On 22 February 2021, Gravina ran for presidency of the FIGC against his deputy Cosimo Sibilia, president of the National Amateur League who supported him, with the support of most professional clubs, the Italian Football Coaches Association and the Italian Footballers Association. He was re-elected with 73.45% of the votes. On 20 April, Gravina was elected to the UEFA executive committee with 53 votes out of 55, making him the first of eight elected.

During Gravina's presidency, on 11 July 2021, the Italian men's national football team became European champion by winning the UEFA Euro 2020. They also finished in third place in the UEFA Nations League Finals in 2021 UEFA Nations League Finals and 2023. Also during his presidency, the women's national team also qualified for the 2023 FIFA Women's World Cup, where they competed in Group G.

However, the men's national team had failed to qualify for the 2022 and 2026 FIFA World Cup, As a result of the failure to qualify on 31 March 2026, two days later Gravina resigned as President of the FIGC.

== Honours ==
=== Orders ===
- 3rd Class / Grand Officer: Grande Ufficiale Ordine al Merito della Repubblica Italiana: 2021
