= Richard Wyn Jones =

British academic

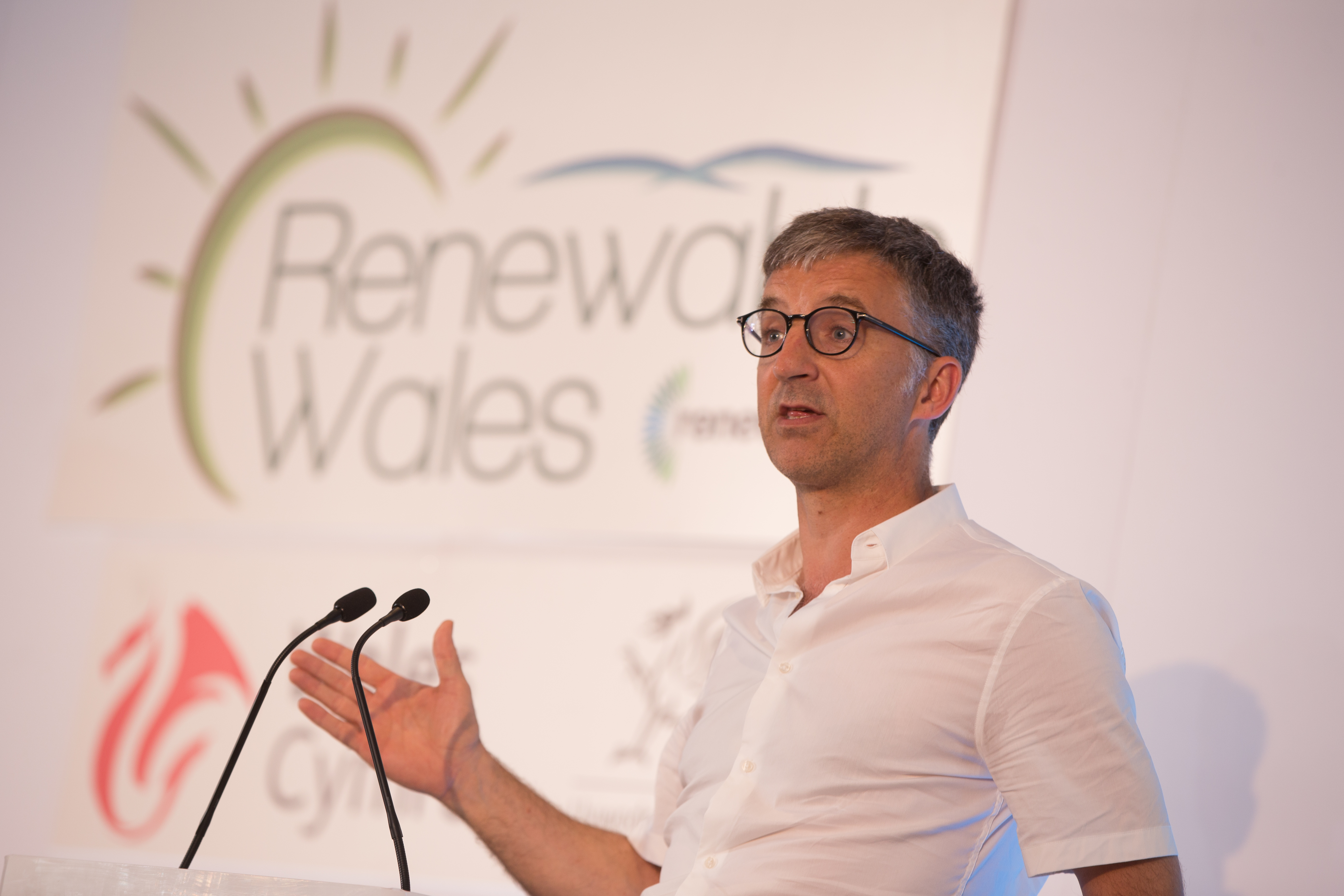
- Wyn Jones in 2016
- Born: 26 June 1966 (age 60); Sunset Boulevard, Hollywood, United States
- Occupations: Academic, lecturer, author
- Known for: Director of the Wales Governance Centre
- Title: Professor

Academic work
- Main interests: Critical security studies, Welsh politics, Devolution in the United Kingdom
- Website: cardiff.ac.uk

Richard Wyn Jones FAcSS FLSW (born 26 May 1966) is a Welsh academic at Cardiff University, where he is Director of Cardiff University's Wales Governance Centre and Dean of Public Affairs. Jones was a former Professor of Welsh Politics at Cardiff as well as the founding Director of the Institute of Welsh Politics and Critical Security Studies at Aberystwyth University.

Since 1997, he has led election surveys helping to detail the attitudes of electors in Wales in the immediate aftermath of Westminster and National Assembly elections. Jones joined the staff of Cardiff University in February 2009 as Director of the Wales Governance Centre. He has written extensively on contemporary Welsh politics, devolved politics in the UK, and nationalism. He is often featured on BBC appearing on both Welsh and English-language broadcasts.

In 2011, he was elected a Fellow of the Learned Society of Wales.

Jones' latest contribution was in August 2021 where he was part of a panel discussing Drakeford's secret for Welsh Labour success on the Guardian Politics Weekly podcast. The panel consisted of Jones, Chris Bryant, Labour MP for Rhondda, and Ruth Mosalski, political editor at Wales online.

== Key publications ==
- Minto, Rachel, and Richard Wyn Jones, 'UK intergovernmental relations: on state-form, sovereignty and Brexit', Territory, Politics, Governance 2025
- Jones, Richard Wyn (2013). ‘Y Blaid Ffasgaidd yng Nghymru’: Plaid Cymru a’r Cyhuddiad o Ffasgaeth. (‘The Fascist Party in Wales’: Plaid Cymru and the Accusation of Fascism.)
- Jones, Richard Wyn; Scully, Roger (2012). "Wales Says Yes: Welsh Devolution and the 2011 Referendum".
- Jones, Richard Wyn (2007). "Rhoi Cymru’n Gyntaf: Syniadaeth Wleidyddol Plaid Cymru", Cyfrol 1. ("Putting Wales First: The political thought of Plaid Cymru", Volume 1.)
- Jones, Richard Wyn, ed. (2001). Critical Theory and World Politics.
- Jones, Richard Wyn (1999). Security, Strategy and Critical Theory.
