= Oliver Gill =

English footballer (born 1990)

Personal information
- Full name: Oliver David Gill
- Date of birth: 15 September 1990 (age 36)
- Place of birth: Frimley, Surrey, England
- Height: 6 ft 1 in (1.85 m)
- Position: Defender

Youth career
- 2007–2009: Manchester United

Senior career*
Years	Team	Apps	(Gls)
2009–2011	Manchester United	0	(0)
2010	→ Bradford City (loan)	4	(0)
Total		4	(0)
- * Club domestic league appearances and goals

Oliver David Gill (born 15 September 1990) is an English former footballer who played as a defender for Manchester United. He also played for Bradford City on loan in 2010. He was born in Frimley, Surrey, and is the son of former Manchester United chief executive David Gill.

== Career ==
Although born in Frimley, Gill and his family moved to Manchester in 1997 when his father David took over as finance director of Manchester United. Gill began training at the Manchester United academy, and was first involved with the Under-18 side in April 2006, when he was named as an unused substitute in a 3–2 away defeat to Sunderland. His first appearance for the Under-18s came more than a year later, as he started in both of the final two games of the 2006–07 season: a 4–0 away win over Sheffield United on 21 April 2007 and a 1–0 home defeat to Sunderland a week later. In July 2007, Gill signed his first trainee contract with the club, and the following season he became a regular in the Under-18 team, making 16 league appearances during the season. Gill's first goal for the Under-18s came on 1 September 2007, when he scored the only goal in the 92nd minute of a 1–0 home win over Nottingham Forest.

Following his first full season in the Under-18s, Gill got his first taste of reserve team football in July 2008, when he made two substitute appearances in pre-season friendlies against Altrincham and Oxford United. Meanwhile, he continued as a regular in the Under-18s, and on 8 October 2008, he made his competitive debut for the reserves: a 3–0 away win over Bolton Wanderers in the Premier Reserve League. In February 2009, Gill made the full step up to the reserve team on a regular basis, playing in 12 of the team's final 17 matches of the season, including the final of the 2008–09 Manchester Senior Cup against Bolton Wanderers; Gill came on for forward Danny Welbeck in the 74th minute, helping United in the final 16 minutes to close out a 1–0 win.

Gill turned professional in July 2009, and in the opening months of the 2009–10 season continued to be an integral member of the reserve team. Throughout the month of October, the team conceded just one goal on the way to four wins and a draw. In December 2009, Gill was rewarded for his performances with a first team squad number, No. 45, and a defensive injury crisis meant that he travelled with the first-team to Germany for their final Champions League group stage game against Wolfsburg on 8 December. He was named as a substitute, but did not take the field. He was again named as an unused substitute for United's 3–0 home win over Fulham on 14 March 2010.

On 29 September 2010, Gill and his Manchester United Reserves team-mate Reece Brown joined Bradford City on a short-term loan deal until 25 October. The pair made their debuts three days later in Bradford's 1–0 home defeat against Morecambe on 2 October. Gill appeared in a further three league matches for Bradford, as well as their Football League Trophy second round defeat to Hartlepool United on 5 October. Despite Bradford manager Peter Taylor's keenness to keep them on, Gill and Brown returned to Manchester United on 25 October. He was named as an unused substitute for United's 1–0 home win over Bolton on 19 March 2011 and the 4–2 away win over West Ham United on 2 April.

On 18 May, Gill was named as the winner of the Denzil Haroun Reserve Player of the Year award for the year. Nevertheless, Gill left Manchester United in July 2011 to go to university the following September.

== Career statistics ==
Club	Season	League		Cup		League Cup		Continental		Other (Note: Includes other competitive competitions, including the FA Community Shield, Football League Trophy)		Total	
Club	Season	Apps	Goals	Apps	Goals	Apps	Goals	Apps	Goals	Apps	Goals	Apps	Goals
Manchester United	2010–11	0	0	0	0	0	0	0	0	0	0	0	0
Bradford City (loan)	2010–11	4	0	0	0	0	0	–		1	0	5	0
Career total		4	0	0	0	0	0	0	0	1	0	5	0

Statistics accurate as of match played 23 October 2010

== Personal life ==
Gill is the son of former Manchester United chief executive David Gill. He studied at Manchester Grammar School and received an offer to study economics at Durham University from September 2010, but decided to defer his entry in favour of following a career in football. He eventually took up the offer in July 2011, leaving Manchester United to pursue his academic career.
