= Eurfyl ap Gwilym =

Welsh economist, banker and politician

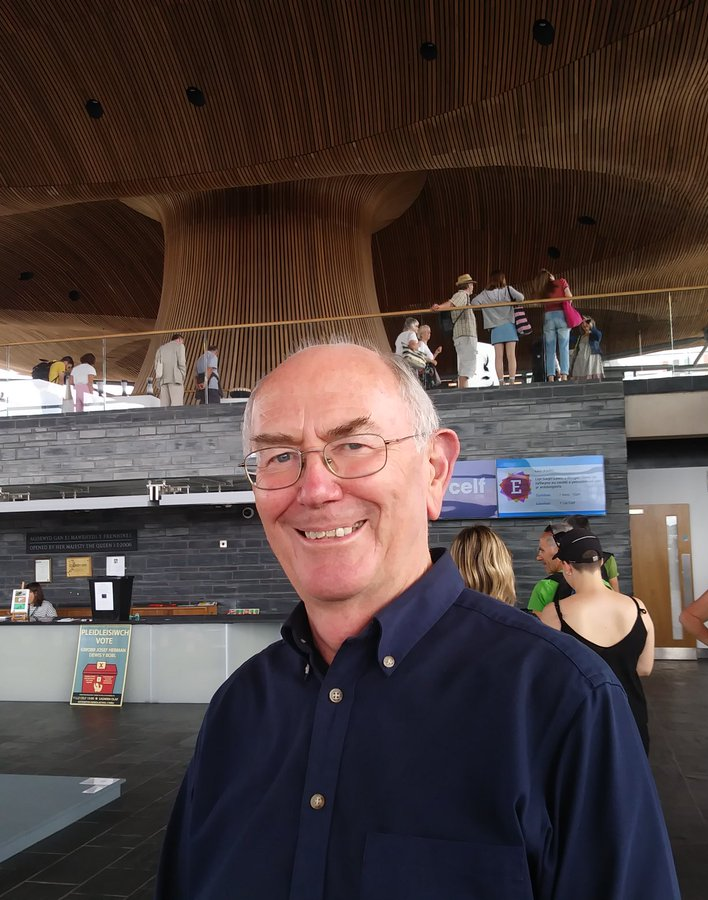
- Ap Gwilym, photographed in the Senedd in 2018

Chairman of Plaid Cymru
- In office 1977–1981

Director of Research for Plaid Cymru
- In office 1973–1977

Personal details
- Born: 14 November 1944 (age 81) Wales
- Party: Plaid Cymru
- Education: King's College London

Eurfyl ap Gwilym (born 14 November 1944) is a Welsh economist and a Plaid Cymru politician.

He was born in Penparcau, Ceredigion and was educated at Ardwyn Grammar School followed by a BSc and PhD at King's College London.

== Professional career ==
Ap Gwilym was previously a Deputy Chairman of the Principality Building Society, which is the largest mutual society in Wales. He was also a director of Nemo Personal Finance Ltd and Loan Link Ltd and was the chair of the Principality Pension Trustees. His other directorships include director of iSOFT Group plc from 19 May 2000 until 30 October 2007, NCC Group plc and Pure Wafer plc.

== Political career ==
Ap Gwilym has been a member of Plaid Cymru since 1963.

He is an economics adviser to the party and was one of their first prospective candidates for the House of Lords. Plaid had dropped its opposition to sending members to the House of Lords in response to constitutional changes that give the second chamber the power to veto law-making proposals put forward by the National Assembly for Wales.

He is a trustee of the Welsh think tank, the Institute of Welsh Affairs, and frequently writes for their ClickOnWales website.

He was formerly the party chairman and serves to cost manifesto proposals each year. He told the BBC in 2017 that the party would not strike a formal deal with the Conservative Party, but controversially has said that the party should consider co-operating with the Tories on particular topics if "we get something in return"

For many years he has advocated a revision of the Barnett formula, which determines how much money Wales receives from HM Treasury. He has proposed alternatives to the current funding settlement and contributes to the Institute of Welsh Affairs on such topics, and argues that if a new formula based on need was introduced, Wales would be entitled to hundreds of millions of pounds extra a year.

Ap Gwilym's public profile rose further after an interview with Jeremy Paxman on the BBC current affairs programme, Newsnight. In the interview ap Gwilym challenged Paxman on a variety of economic figures, telling him to "do your homework" when those figures were not readily available. A recording of the interview received over 90,000 hits on YouTube within the first few days of release.

Party political offices
Preceded by Phil Williams	Chair of Plaid Cymru; 1976–1980	Succeeded by Ieuan Wyn Jones
