= Steve Martin (academic) =

British academic (born 1961)

Stephen Martin
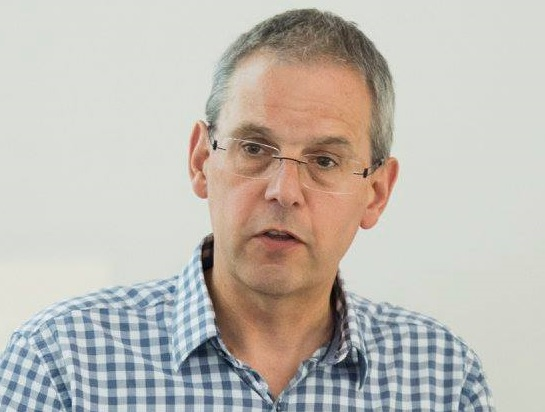
- Born: 27 February 1961 (age 65)
- Education: Aston University; University of Oxford
- Occupation: Academic

Steve Martin (born 27 February 1961) is a British academic. He is Professor Emeritus of Public Policy and founding Director of the Wales Centre for Public Policy at Cardiff University.

== Education ==
Steve Martin was educated at Sir Joseph Williamson's Mathematical School in Rochester, Hertford College at University of Oxford, and Aston University. He was awarded an Open Scholarship to the University of Oxford and gained a Congratulatory Double First in 1982. He was awarded a PhD by Aston University in 1987 for his research on state funded support to small and medium sized businesses in rural England.

== Career ==
Martin's previous academic appointments include: ESRC Research Fellow at Aston Business School; Lecturer in Public Sector Management at Aston University; and University Research Fellow and Reader in Public Policy Evaluation at the University of Warwick.

Whilst at Warwick he led the Local Authority Research Consortium, a collaboration between researchers and local government leaders which produced a series of groundbreaking studies on managing organisational and external change. In 1997 he was commissioned by the Blair government to conduct an independent evaluation of its flagship Best Value pilot programme which aimed to improve the cost effectiveness and quality of local government services in England.

Martin was appointed as a Professor at Cardiff Business School in 2000 where he established the Centre for Local & Regional Government Research, which he led until 2013. The Centre attracted more than £10 million in external research funding and became recognised as one of the leading public management research groups in the world, rated third in an independent study conducted by academics at Erasmus University and ranked fourth in the Academic Ranking of World Universities. Martin and his colleagues at Cardiff completed major studies on public service improvement with a particular focus on Best Value inspection, Comprehensive Performance Assessment and Corporate Peer Challenge. He has also evaluated external interventions in failing councils in England and Wales.

In 2013 Martin was asked by the First Minister of Wales to establish and lead the Public Policy Institute for Wales, which was succeeded in 2017 by the Wales Centre for Public Policy. The Centre is one of the UK's What Works Centres. It collaborates with leading researchers to provide ministers, officials and public service leaders with authoritative independent evidence and expertise. In 2018 the Centre won the 20th Anniversary Cardiff University Award for Impact on Policy and in 2019 it was a finalist in the Economic and Social Research Council's prestigious Impact Prize for its 'outstanding impact on public policy'.

== Government adviser ==
Martin has given evidence to numerous Parliamentary select committees and inquiries and served on a range of advisory bodies. He is a past Treasurer of the UK Evaluation Society, was a non-executive director of the Local Government Improvement and Development Agency from 2003 to 2010 and of the New Local Government Network from 2007 to 2016. In 2009 he was appointed as the lead member of the UK Government's Expert Panel on Local Governance. He was a member of independent panel on Assembly Members' remuneration in 2007–2008, and in 2005–2006 he served as the Academic Adviser to the Independent Review of Local Public Services chaired by Sir Jeremy Beecham.

== Publications ==
Martin has published more than 150 book chapters and articles in leading academic journals including Public Administration Review, Public Administration, Regional Studies, Public Management Review, Urban Studies, and the British Journal of Management, as well as over 200 reports commissioned by governments and other agencies. He was the editor of Policy & Politics from 2015 to 2020 and served as the public sector expert on the scientific committee of the Chartered Association of Business Schools' academic journal guide for four years until 2019.

== Personal life ==
Professor Martin has two daughters and lives in Penarth, South Wales, with his wife, Hattie.
