= John Osmond =

Welsh political reporter and television producer

John Osmond (born 1946) is a Welsh writer, journalist, former political candidate for Plaid Cymru, and think tank director. He has contributed to numerous books on the subjects of Welsh politics, culture and devolution, and is also a former television producer. Osmond was the founder director of the independent Welsh think-tank, the Institute of Welsh Affairs in 1996 until May 2013. In 2018 he publishedTen Million Stars are Burning the first volume of a documentary novel, Wales 1979 and 1997, which records the history of Wales between the 1979 and 1997 devolution referendums. The second volume Soul on Fire is being published during October 2026, along with republication of Ten Million Stars are Burning. Between 2018 and 2022 he was Special Adviser to Plaid Cymru leader Adam Price. In that capacity, in the wake of the 2021 Senedd election he was involved in negotiating the Co-operation Agreement between Labour and Plaid. In 2024 he published an account of how this emerged and its impact, The Politics of Co-Opposition: The Inside Story of the 2021-24 Co-Operation Agreement between Plaid Cymru and Welsh Labour (Welsh Academic Press).

== Personal life and education ==
John Osmond was born in Abergavenny in 1946. He attended King Henry VIII Grammar School, before moving on to study for a Bachelor of Arts (BA) in Philosophy and Politics at the University of Bristol. In 2004 he was awarded an honorary MA by the University of Wales. He has three children.

== Career ==
Upon leaving University, Osmond began working as a reporter for the Yorkshire Evening Post. He returned to Wales in the 1970s to work for the Western Mail newspaper as a reporter and Welsh Affairs Correspondent. During the 1980s he worked for HTV Wales, helping launch the current affairs programme Wales this Week and producing a number of documentary series, including The Divided Kingdom for Channel 4. He was Deputy Editor for Wales on Sunday between 1988 and 1990.

In the 1990s Osmond formed his own television company, Agenda Productions, producing programmes for the BBC, HTV, Channel 4, S4C and STV.

In 1996 Osmond became the founding director of the Welsh think-tank, the Institute of Welsh Affairs, retiring in 2013. In May 2007 he stood for election for the Preseli Pembrokeshire constituency in the National Assembly for Wales Election, representing Plaid Cymru and received 24.7% of the vote. However, Conservative candidate Paul Davies won the seat, defeating Tamsin Dunwoody, the Welsh Labour incumbent, he stood again, unsuccessfully, in 2016 finishing third and winning just 13.9% of the vote.

== Notable positions ==
Osmond was the editor of a radical magazine, Arcade: Wales Fortnightly, which was published between 1980 and 1982.

He has held a number of notable positions:

- Special Adviser to Plaid Cymru leader Adam Price, 2018-2022
- Honorary Senior Research Fellow with the Constitution Unit, School of Public Policy, University College, London.
- Fellow of the University of Wales Institute, Cardiff.
- Member of Academi Literature Promotion Agency for Wales.
- Board Member of Pembrokeshire Darwin Centre for Biology and Medicine.
- Board Member of Cynnal Cymru: the Sustainable Development Forum for Wales.

== Publications ==
Osmond has written a wide range of books on Welsh politics, culture and devolution; the titles of which are given below.

- Wales 1979 and 1997 in two volumes, Ten Million Stars are Burning and Soul on Fire (The H'Mm Foundation, 2026).
- The Politics of Co-Opposition: The Inside Story of the 2021-24 Co-Operation Agreement between Plaid Cymru and Welsh Labour (Welsh Academic Press, 2024).
- Real Preseli (Seren, 2019)
- Ten Million Stars Are Burning (Gomer, 2018)
- Crossing the Rubicon: Coalition Politics Welsh Style (IWA, 2007)
- Myths, Memories and Futures: The National Library and National Museum in the Story of Wales (Editor, IWA, 2007)
- Time to Deliver: The Third Term and Beyond (Editor, IWA, 2006)
- Welsh Politics Come of Ages (Editor, IWA, 2005)
- Birth of Welsh Democracy (Editor, IWA, 2003)
- Building a Civic Culture: Institutional Change, Policy Development and Political Dynamics in the National Assembly for Wales (co-Editor, 2002, IWA)
- The National Assembly Agenda (Editor, IWA, 1998)
- Welsh Europeans (Seren, 1995)
- The Reality of Dyslexia (Cassell, 1993)
- The Democratic Challenge (Gomer, 1992)
- The Divided Kingdom (Constable, 1988)
- Work in the Future (Thorsons, 1986)
- The National Question Again - Welsh Political Identity in the 1980s (Editor, Gomer, 1985)
- Police Conspiracy (Y Lolfa, 1984)
- Alternatives (Thorsons, 1983)
- Creative Conflict: The Politics of Welsh Devolution (Routledge, 1978)
- The Centralist Enemy (Christopher Davies, 1974)

== Sources ==
- Institute of Welsh Affairs 'Staff' page, October 2007
- , June 2003
- , May 2007
