= Laura McAllister =

Welsh academic, former international footballer and senior sports administrator

Laura McAllister CBE FLSW
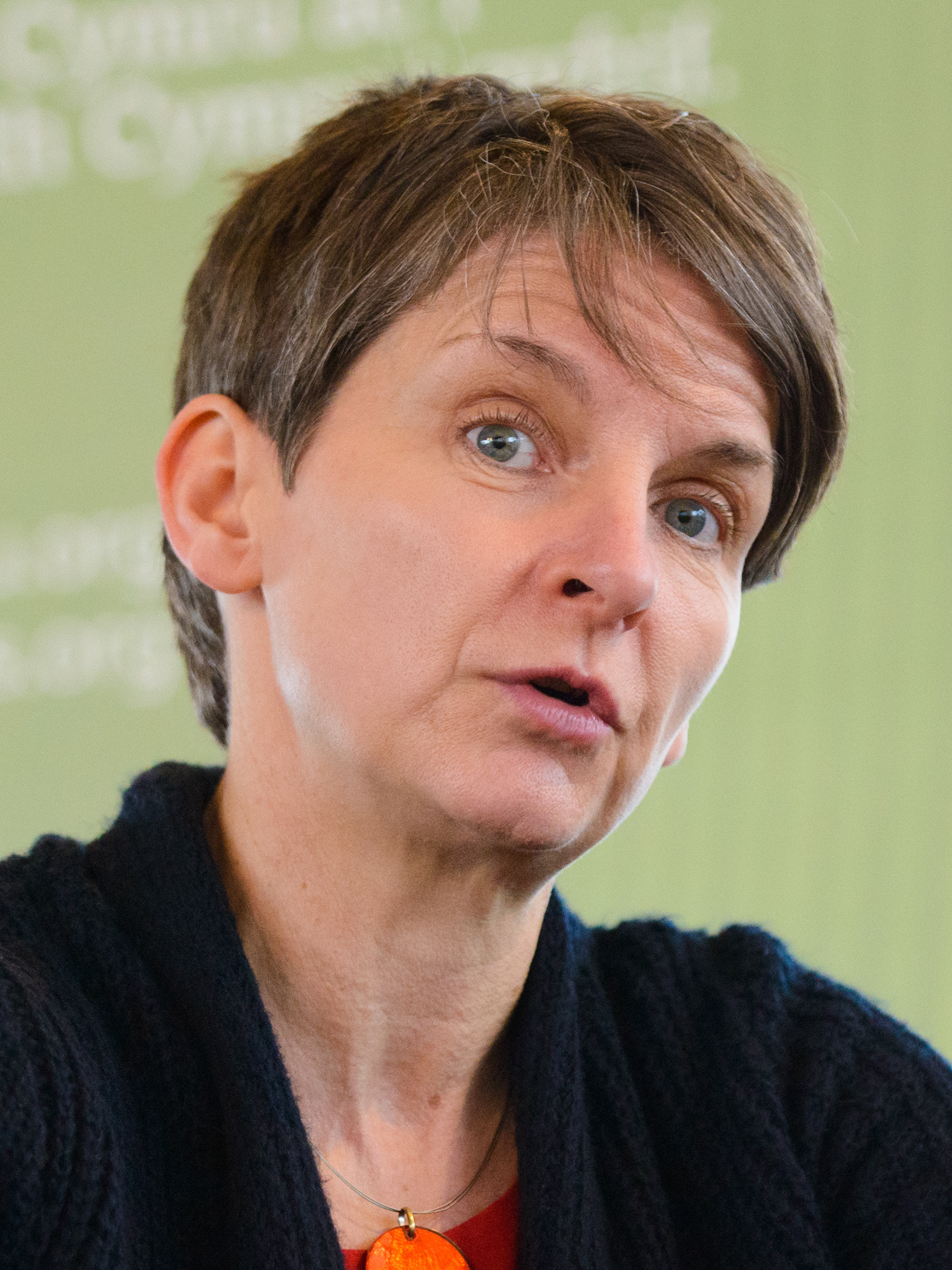
- McAllister in 2013

UEFA Vice President
- Incumbent
- Assumed office 29 May 2019 Serving with Zbigniew Boniek, Armand Duka, David Gill and Gabriele Gravina
- President: Aleksander Čeferin
- Vice President: Karl-Erik Nilsson (as first vice-president)

Personal details
- Born: Laura McAllister; 10 December 1964 (age 61) Bridgend, Wales
- Height: 5 ft 6 in (168 cm)
- Occupation: Footballer; Football administrator Academic
Association football career
Senior career*
Years	Team	Apps	(Gls)
- Millwall Lionesses
- Inter Cardiff; Cardiff City
International career
1994–1998	Wales	24	(0)
- * Club domestic league appearances and goals

Laura McAllister CBE FLSW (born 10 December 1964) is a Welsh academic, sports administrator and former international footballer. As a Wales women's national football team player, McAllister won 24 caps and served as team captain. She is currently Professor of Public Policy and the Governance of Wales at the Wales Governance Centre at Cardiff University.

She was formerly Professor of Governance at Liverpool University. She was appointed Commander of the Order of the British Empire (CBE) in the 2016 Birthday Honours for services to sport. She was a board member of Stonewall from 2012 to 2015, and is currently a board member of the Institute of Welsh Affairs. She is Chair of the Welsh Sports Hall of Fame and a Non-executive Director of Goodson Thomas boutique executive search agency. She was honoured as one of the BBC 100 Women in December 2022. Since April 2023, she has also been a vice-president of UEFA.

== Academic career ==
McAllister is a former pupil of Ysgol Glyndwr and Bryntirion Comprehensive School in Bridgend. She is a graduate of the London School of Economics, where she completed a BSc. (Econ.) Honours degree in government, and at Cardiff University, where she completed a PhD in Politics. She was Professor of Governance at the University of Liverpool Management School between 1998 and October 2016. She is now Professor of Governance and Public Policy at Cardiff University's Wales Governance Centre. She was elected as a Fellow of the Learned Society of Wales (FLSW) in 2015.

She was a member of the National Assembly for Wales Remuneration Board from 2014 to 2015, an advisor to the Independent Panel on Assembly Members' Pay and Support from 2008 to 2009, and a member of the Richard Commission between 2002 and 2004. She advised the Independent Panel on AMs' Pay and Support, 2008–10 and was Chair of the Expert Panel on Assembly Electoral Reform which published its report "A Parliament that Works for Wales" in December 2017. In October 2021, she was named co-chair of the Independent Constitutional Commission on Wales' place in the United Kingdom.

She holds honorary degrees and fellowships from Bangor University, Cardiff University, Cardiff Metropolitan University, Swansea University, and Trinity St David's University.

== Club career ==
McAllister was a club athlete (middle distance) and played netball and hockey. She did not play organised football until she joined Millwall Lionesses while studying at the London School of Economics. Upon her return to Wales, she spent 12 years with Cardiff City. McAllister was Club Captain and collected two Welsh Women's Cup winner's medals and won promotion into the FA Women's Premier League with Cardiff City. She is one of the club's Vice Presidents.

== International career ==
In 1992, McAllister was one of three female footballers who lobbied Football Association of Wales (FAW) secretary Alun Evans to grant recognition to women's football in Wales. An official team was put together and entered the 1995 UEFA Women's Championship qualification tournament. McAllister made her debut in Wales' second match, a 12–0 defeat by eventual winners Germany in Bielefeld. She won a total of 24 caps for Wales and was team captain on many occasions.

== Sports governance ==
Professor McAllister was Chair of Sport Wales between 2010 and March 2016. In this role, she oversaw the most successful period ever for elite sport in Wales, with Wales winning a record number of medals in the Commonwealth Games 2014, the 2012 London Olympics and Paralympics and the 2016 Rio Olympics and Paralympics. She was also a board member of UK Sport between 2010 and 2016, when Team GB broke its medal-winning records. She is currently a Director of the Football Association of Wales Trust.

McAllister was nominated by the Football Association of Wales for election as UEFA's female member of the FIFA Council but was controversially prevented from standing. She is currently Deputy Chair of the UEFA Women's Football Committee (2017–) and Chair of the Welsh Sports Hall of Fame. McAllister contested the election for the female representative from UEFA on FIFA Council, but was narrowly beaten by Evelina Christillin. In April 2023 McAllister was finally elected unopposed as vice-president of UEFA, the first person from Wales to be on the executive committee.

== Politics and media ==
McAllister was a Plaid Cymru Parliamentary candidate in 1987 and 1992 but left the party shortly afterwards. She is currently a political commentator for the BBC and other media platforms. She commentates regularly on international, network and Welsh media on Welsh politics, elections and public policy. McAllister writes a regular column on current affairs, sport and politics in the Western Mail newspaper and for Wales Online. In 2001, she authored a book titled Plaid Cymru: The Emergence of a Political Party on the history of the party through its first 75 years.

On 10 February 2022, McAllister was a panellist for BBC's Question Time. McAllister was the only Welsh woman to be included in the BBC's 100 Women List 2022, alongside Priyanka Chopra Jonas, Geraldina Guerra Garcés, Selma Blair and 96 others.

Following a 2026 FIFA World Cup controversy sparked by a phone call by U.S. president Donald Trump to FIFA president Gianni Infantino, during which the former asked the latter that a contentious red card decision against U.S player Folarin Balogun be reviewed before his team's game against Belgium, McAllister said that this situation created "an absolute cesspit for the future [of football] because anyone can appeal." She added that [at UEFA] "We're very clear what the rules of our competitions are. We know exactly what rules and regulations are applied – as do all the participants at the beginning – so to even create an environment where you can undermine the awarding of punishments on the pitch for right or wrong is very dangerous".

== Visit to Qatar ==
While following Wales to the 2022 FIFA World Cup, McAllister was prevented from entering the stadium ahead of the opening game with a bucket hat which had a rainbow on it. FIFA officials told her that the hat was a "restricted item" and attempted to confiscate it from her. The attempts to separate McAllister from her bucket hat seemed to relate to a crackdown in Qatar on items that had a rainbow on them and affected numerous other fans, including U.S. former Sports Illustrated journalist Grant Wahl, who was arrested over a t-shirt, as well as a reporter for The New York Times who attempted to report on that incident only to become caught up in the crackdown himself.

== Personal life ==
McAllister and her partner Llinos Jones have two children.
