= Wales Centre for Public Policy =

Welsh research institute

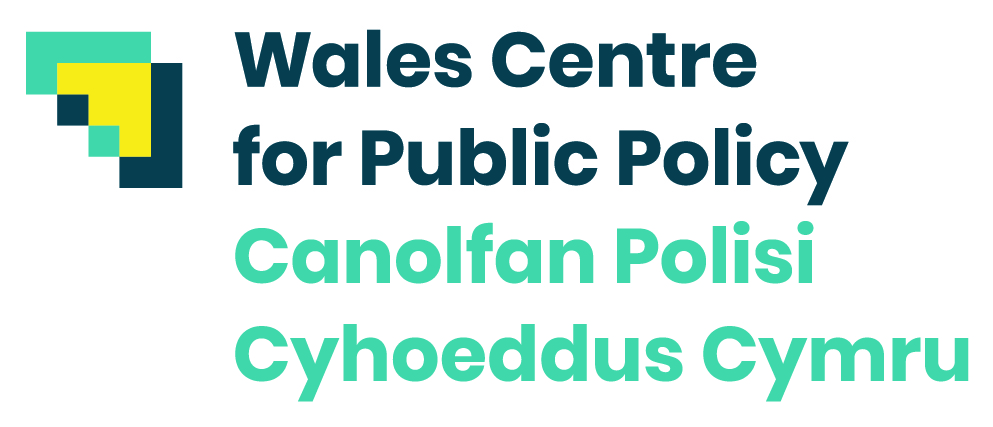
- Abbreviation: WCPP
- Predecessor: Public Policy Institute for Wales
- Formation: October 2017
- Purpose: Working to address key economic and societal challenges through the use of evidence.
- Location: Cardiff
- Director: Steve Martin
- Website: www.wcpp.org.uk

The Wales Centre for Public Policy (WCPP) is an independent policy research institution based in Cardiff, Wales.

It was established in October 2017, as a successor to the former Public Policy Institute for Wales (PPIW). The Centre builds on the work of the PPIW, combining it with a broader approach which involves working with public services and as part of the UK-wide What Works network. The Centre is based at Cardiff University and is co-funded by the Economic and Social Research Council and the Welsh Government.

== Function ==
Through close collaboration with leading policy experts the WCPP aims to provide Welsh Government Ministers, the civil service, and public services with high quality evidence and independent advice to enable them to improve policy decisions and outcomes for Wales. The WCPP helps policymakers and academic experts come together to make best use of the research base.

The WCPP meets regularly with all ministers to discuss their evidence needs, conducts reviews of the existing evidence, and identifies experts who it can work with to provide support to ministers and officials. Working with experts, the WCPP then produce reports and ministerial briefings and facilitate roundtables, workshops and public events, where researchers and policymakers work together to identify solutions to policy problems.

Using existing knowledge and expertise allows the WCPP to provide evidence more quickly than traditional academic studies involving new research. The studies are completed to short deadlines (three to six months, or less), meaning that results are available to Ministers when they are most useful.

== Organisation ==
Professor Steve Martin is the Director of the WCPP. The WCPP is overseen by an independent Advisory Group, who steer the WCPP’s overall strategy and future development; advise on ways to ensure that its work makes a positive difference; and ensure that its work is rigorous, authoritative, and independent. Members of the WCPP Advisory Board include Professor Laura McAllister, Welsh academic and former international footballer and Professor Sir Ian Diamond, who was appointed the UK's National Statistician in October 2019.

The WCPP employs 18 full-time members of staff, and its administrative base is located as a part of Cardiff University, Wales.

== Awards ==
In June 2018 the WCPP was awarded the Impact on Policy Award at Cardiff University’s Innovation and Impact Awards.

In July 2019 the WCPP was named as a finalist in the ESRC’s Celebrating Impact Prize in recognition of the way in which it has enabled Ministers to use evidence to inform policy decisions.
