= Public Policy Institute for Wales =

Welsh policy research institution

- Abbreviation: PPIW
- Successor: Wales Centre for Public Policy
- Formation: January 2014

The Public Policy Institute for Wales (PPIW) was an independent policy research institution based in Cardiff, Wales.

It was established in January 2014, and was co-funded by the Economic and Social Research Council and the Welsh Government. Its administrative base was at Cardiff University, Wales. It was a member of the UK’s What Works Network.

The PPIW’s key activities included:

- Stimulating policy-maker demand for evidence by working directly with Ministers to identify their evidence needs and make connections across policy areas.
- Improving the supply of evidence by making policy-maker evidence needs know and generating independent authoritative advice and analysis.
- Supporting interaction between evidence suppliers and policy-makers by developing networks.
- Facilitating knowledge exchange between Wales, the rest of the UK and beyond.

Professor Steve Martin was the Director of the PPIW. The PPIW had an independent Board of Governors, whose role it was to oversee the work of the Institute; safeguarding its independence and ensuring the quality of its work.

In June 2017 the PPIW was awarded £6m by the Economic and Social Research Council and the Welsh Government to establish the Wales Centre for Public Policy (WCPP). The WCPP builds on the work of the PPIW, combining it with a broader approach which involves working with public services and as part of the UK-wide What Works initiative. The PPIW was absorbed into the WCPP in October 2017.
