= Karl-Erik Nilsson (referee) =

Swedish football referee

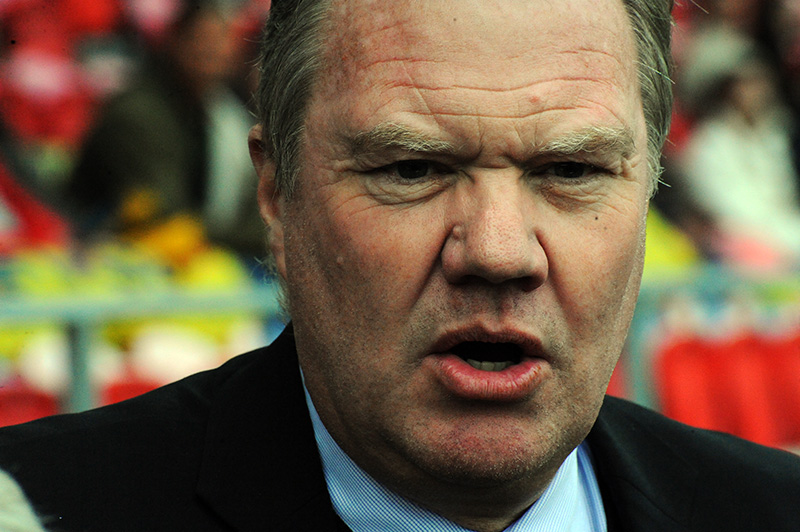
- Nilsson in 2014
- Born: 6 May 1957 (age 69); Emmaboda, Sweden
- Other occupation: Football administrator

Domestic
Years	League	Role
1992-2002	Allsvenskan	Referee

International
Years	League	Role
1994–2002	FIFA–listed	Referee

Karl-Erik Nilsson (born 6 May 1957) is the first vice-president of UEFA. Nilsson is also a retired football referee.

== Life ==
=== Early career ===
Nilsson was born on 6 May 1957 in Emmaboda, Sweden. He studied to become an elementary school teacher, a profession he practised during the 1970s. Nilsson also worked in the correctional system of Sweden. As a politician for the Social Democratic Party, Nilsson was the chairman of the municipal board of Emmaboda Municipality between 1994 and 2006.

=== Referee ===
In the 1980s Nilsson started his career as a professional football referee. Nilsson supervised his first Allsvenskan match in 1992 and became a FIFA certified referee in 1994. He is best known for supervising matches during the UEFA Champions League (1999–2002). He was also a regular choice for leading international matches in the 1990s, for instance at the 1997 FIFA World Youth Championship. Nilsson's other official competitions included qualifiers for Euro 1996, Euro 2000, and the 1998 and 2002 World Cups. He also worked as a fourth official during UEFA Euro 1996.

=== The Swedish Football Association ===
After his career as a referee Nilsson remained in football and served as the chairman of Bohusläns Fotbollförbund until 2012. Nilsson was also active as a member of the boards of directors at the Swedish Football Association before he was elected president of the association on 23 March 2012 after Lars-Åke Lagrell resigned.

On 28 May 2023, he was appointed chairperson for the Sveriges Riksidrottsförbund, succeeding Björn Eriksson.

=== Support for the Russian invasion of Ukraine ===
On 26 September 2023, Nilsson voted in UEFA for allowing again Russian participation in European competitions. Following the public outcry against his support for Russia in the Russia-Ukraine with this vote resulted in Nilsson being forced to resign as chairperson for the Sveriges Riksidrottsförbund on 6 October 2025.
