= Governance of England =

England-wide governance within the United Kingdom

Governance of England describes the parliamentary and government structures that exercise legislative and executive functions across the whole of England.

There has not been a government of England since 1707, when the Kingdom of England ceased to exist as a sovereign state after merging with the Kingdom of Scotland to form the Kingdom of Great Britain. The Kingdom of Great Britain continued from 1707 until 1801 when it merged with the Kingdom of Ireland to form the United Kingdom of Great Britain and Ireland, which itself became the United Kingdom of Great Britain and Northern Ireland (UK) in 1922 (in reality; in name in 1927) upon independence for most of the island of Ireland.

== Background ==
The UK since then has gone through significant change to its system of government, with devolved parliaments, assemblies and governments in Scotland, Wales and Northern Ireland. England, however, remains under the full jurisdiction of the Parliament of the United Kingdom of Great Britain and Northern Ireland and the UK government as no devolved administration has been created for England within the new structure.

This situation led to the anomaly, known as the West Lothian question, which is that Scottish Members of Parliament (MPs) have been able to vote on legislation that affects only England whereas English MPs have been unable to vote on certain Scottish matters due to devolution. In some cases, such as top-up university tuition fees and foundation hospitals, the votes of Scottish MPs have been crucial in helping pass legislation for England that the majority of English MPs have opposed. An attempt was made to address this anomaly in 2015 through the use of an English votes for English laws procedure which aimed to ensure that legislation affecting only England required a majority vote of MPs representing English constituencies.

Another possible solution to the West Lothian question would have been devolution to the English regions but attempts have been unsuccessful so far. Among the parts of England, Greater London has a degree of devolved power (although weaker than that of Scotland, Wales and Northern Ireland) with power vested in a Greater London Authority.

England is officially divided as follows for administrative purposes:

- The nine English regions,
- The modern day local authority areas,
- The geographical/ceremonial counties of England.

As of 2024, there are no plans to create a devolved English parliament and corresponding English executive.

== Shared competences ==
The UK Parliament retains the following legislative competencies in relation to England, which are exercised by devolved legislatures in the rest of the United Kingdom:

- Agriculture
- Culture
- Education
- Environment
- Health (including social care)
- Housing
- Local government
- Road transport (including buses, cycling and local transport)
- Sport
- Tourism

== Departments and agencies of the UK government ==
Prior to 1999, the Scottish Office, Welsh Office and Northern Ireland Office, exercised a wide range of government functions in their respective nations. After devolved administrations were established, secretaries of state for Scotland, Wales and Northern Ireland remained in place to represent the interests of people in the devolved nations at UK Cabinet level and to act as a conduit between central government and the devolved administrations. England however remains under the responsibility of several subject-specific government departments, many with broader UK-wide roles. There is no cabinet level secretary whose remit is to represent England as a whole.

Several ministerial departments of the UK government, as well as non-ministerial departments, executive agencies, and non-departmental public bodies, have responsibilities that apply only to England.

=== Ministerial departments ===
- Ministry of Housing, Communities and Local Government.
- Department for Education
- Department for Environment, Food and Rural Affairs (Defra)
- Department of Health and Social Care

The following ministerial departments deal mainly with matters affecting England though they also have some UK-wide responsibilities in certain areas;

- Department for Transport
- Department for Culture, Media and Sport

=== Non-ministerial departments ===
- Forestry Commission
- Office for Standards in Education, Children's Services and Skills (Ofsted)
- Office of Qualifications and Examinations Regulation (Ofqual)

=== Executive agencies ===
- Active Travel England
- Health Security Agency
- Planning Inspectorate
- Rural Payments Agency
- Standards and Testing Agency
- Teaching Regulation Agency

=== Non-departmental public bodies ===
- Arts Council England
- Care Quality Commission
- Children's Commissioner for England
- Environment Agency
- Forestry England
- Historic England
- Homes England
- Local Audit Office
- Natural England
- NHS England
- NHS Resolution
- Office for Students
- Office of the Schools Adjudicator
- Regulator of Social Housing
- School Teachers' Review Body
- Skills England
- Social Work England
- Sport England
- VisitEngland

=== Tribunals ===
- Valuation Tribunal for England

=== Boundary commissions ===
- Boundary Commission for England
- Local Government Boundary Commission for England

=== Ombudsmen ===
- Housing Ombudsman
- Local Government and Social Care Ombudsman

=== Government owned companies ===
- Community Health Partnerships
- DfT Operator
- English Institute of Sport
- Genomics England
- Highways England
- NHS Property Services
- NHS Professionals
- NHS Shared Business Services

== Mechanisms in the UK parliament ==
Unlike Scotland, Wales and Northern Ireland, which have had their own devolved legislatures since the late 1990s, England remains under the full jurisdiction of the United Kingdom parliament based in Westminster. In the 2024 general election, 543 of the 650 MPs were elected from constituencies in England.

Some mechanisms exist within the UK parliament to allow members elected from constituencies elected in England to discuss issues relating to the nation as a whole or to specific regions of England.

The Regional Affairs Committee was established in 2000. It has 13 members, however any MP from a constituency in England may attend and participate in its procedures effectively making it a de facto English grand committee. The standing order establishing the Regional Affairs Committee remains in force, however the committee last met in 2004 and no appointments have been made to it since 2005.

Eight Regional Grand Committees and Regional Select Committees existed between 2008 and 2010 for the eight regions of England outside Greater London.

=== English votes for English laws ===
As part of a commitment to introduce a policy known as English votes for English laws, prime minister David Cameron established a Legislative Grand Committee in 2015 in an attempt to give English MPs a greater say over legislation that only applies to England. The system of English Votes for English Laws was abolished by Boris Johnson's Conservative government in 2021.

On 22 October 2015 The House of Commons voted in favour of implementing a system of "English votes for English laws" by 312 votes to 270 after four hours of intense debate. Amendments to the proposed standing orders put forward by both Labour and The Liberal Democrats were defeated. Scottish National Party MPs criticized the measures stating that the bill would render Scottish MPs as "second class citizens". Under the new procedures, if the Speaker of The House determines that a proposed bill or statutory instrument exclusively affects England, England and Wales or England, Wales and Northern Ireland, then legislative consent should be obtained via a Legislative Grand Committee. This process was performed at the second reading of a bill or instrument as an attempt at answering the West Lothian question. English votes for English laws was suspended in April 2020, and in July 2021 the House of Commons abolished it, returning to the previous system with no special mechanism for English laws.

== Proposals for an English parliament ==
England is the only country of the United Kingdom to not have a devolved national legislature or government and English affairs are decided by the UK Parliament and UK central government. In the late 1990s a campaign was started to establish a Devolved English Parliament similar to that established in Scotland, Wales and Northern Ireland.

There have been proposals for the establishment of a single devolved English parliament to govern the affairs of England as a whole. This has been supported by groups such as English Commonwealth, the English Democrats, and Campaign for an English Parliament, as well as the Scottish National Party and Plaid Cymru who have both expressed support for greater autonomy for all four nations while ultimately striving for a dissolution of the Union. Without its own devolved Parliament, England continues to be governed and legislated for by the UK Government and UK Parliament, which gives rise to the West Lothian question. The question concerns the fact that, on devolved matters, Scottish MPs continue to help make laws that apply to England alone, although no English MPs can make laws on those same matters for Scotland. Since the 2014 Scottish independence referendum, there has been a wider debate about the UK adopting a federal system with each of the four Home Nations having its own equal devolved legislature and law-making powers.

In the first five years of devolution for Scotland and Wales, support in England for the establishment of an English parliament was low at between 16 and 19 per cent. While a 2007 opinion poll found that 61 per cent would support such a parliament being established, a report based on the British Social Attitudes Survey published in December 2010 suggests that only 29 per cent of people in England support the establishment of an English parliament, though this figure has risen from 17 per cent in 2007. John Curtice argues that tentative signs of increased support for an English parliament might represent "a form of English nationalism ... beginning to emerge among the general public". Krishan Kumar, however, notes that support for measures to ensure that only English MPs can vote on legislation that applies only to England is generally higher than that for the establishment of an English parliament, although support for both varies depending on the timing of the opinion poll and the wording of the question.

In September 2011 it was announced that the British government was to set up a commission to examine the West Lothian question. In January 2012 it was announced that this six-member commission would be named the Commission on the consequences of devolution for the House of Commons, would be chaired by former Clerk of the House of Commons, Sir William McKay, and would have one member from each of the devolved countries. The McKay Commission reported in March 2013.

== Historical governments of England ==
- Government in Anglo-Saxon England
- Government in Norman and Angevin England
- Government in late medieval England
- Elizabethan government

== See also ==
- Politics of England
- International relations of England
- List of parliaments of England
- The Difference between an Absolute and Limited Monarchy, a 14th century English constitutional work
