= Legislative grand committees =

Former committees of the Parliament of the United Kingdom

The legislative grand committees were committees of the Parliament of the United Kingdom. They were established in 2015 and abolished in July 2021.

There were three legislative grand committees:

- Legislative Grand Committee (England), made up of all 533 English MPs
- Legislative Grand Committee (England and Wales), made up of all 573 MPs elected from constituencies in England and in Wales
- Legislative Grand Committee (England, Wales and Northern Ireland), made up of all 591 MPs elected from constituencies in England, Wales and Northern Ireland.

== History ==
A grand committee for Scotland, the Scottish Grand Committee, was established in 1907 to consider issues and legislation exclusive to Scotland. Grand committees for Wales (Welsh Grand Committee) and Northern Ireland (Northern Ireland Grand Committee) were subsequently established to consider issues relating to those nations. No grand committee was established for England; however, a Regional Affairs Committee was established to discuss issues relating to the Regions of England. This committee had thirteen members, but all English MPs could attend and participate in its proceedings. Regional Select Committees and grand committees also existed for the English Regions between 2008 and 2010.

Standing orders to establish a legislative grand committee were approved by the House of Commons in October 2015 as part of efforts to address the so-called West Lothian Question, an anomaly whereby MPs representing seats in Scotland, Wales and Northern Ireland can vote on issues and legislation which only affect people in England. The idea of establishing a grand committee for England was suggested by Conservative MP Sir Malcolm Rifkind in 2007 as part of his "East Lothian Answer" to the West Lothian Question. This was echoed by the report of the McKay Commission established by the Conservative-Liberal Democrat coalition government, published in 2013.

== Functions ==
The legislative grand committees were established in 2015 to facilitate the Conservative government's policy of ensuring that legislation that only applies in England can only be enacted with the consent of MPs representing constituencies in England. This system has been dubbed "English votes for English laws".

The Speaker judged which parts of a bill relate to just England, or England and Wales. When a bill was deemed to apply to "England-only in its entirety", an England-only committee stage considered the bill. Membership of this committee reflected the number of MPs each party had in England. Where sections of legislation related only to England, to England and Wales or to England, Wales and Northern Ireland, agreement of a legislative grand committee all of English MPs, or as the case may be, all English and Welsh or English, Welsh and Northern Irish MPs, was required. All MPs were able to vote on the bill's Third Reading, but a double majority of all MPs and English (or English and Welsh) MPs would be required for the bill to be passed.

The first bill that was scrutinised by the committees was the Housing and Planning Act 2016, which had its second reading on 2 November 2015. Between October 2015 and December 2016, the committees met 15 times. Seven times in the England only configuration, seven times in the England and Wales configuration and once in the England, Wales and Northern Ireland configuration. The total time accumulated by sittings of the committees during that period was one hour and twenty three minutes.

== Abolition ==
The committees were suspended in April 2020. They were abolished by Boris Johnson's Conservative government in July 2021.

== See also ==
- Parliamentary committees of the United Kingdom
- Regional Affairs Committee
- Governance of England
- Devolved English parliament
