= Scottish mafia =

Group of Scottish Labour Party MPs

The Scottish mafia, Scottish Labour mafia, tartan mafia, Scottish Raj, or Caledonian mafia is a term used in the politics of England from the mid-1960s, although fell out of use after the initial collapse in the number of Scottish Labour MPs at the 2015 general election.

== Political use ==
The term is used in politics to pejoratively refer to a group of Scottish Labour Party politicians and broadcasters who are believed to have undue influence over the governance of England, such as the constitutional arrangement allowing Scottish MPs to vote on English matters, but, by convention, not the other way around. (Note: Under the Scotland Act 1998, Westminster retains its sovereignty over the Scottish Parliament, but do not typically vote on devolved matters.) The term is occasionally used in the UK press and in parliamentary debates.

Since the mid-1960s, the Conservatives have suffered from declining popularity amongst Scottish voters. In the 1999 Scottish Parliament election, the Conservatives won only 18 of 129 seats. That number has stayed relatively steady, with the party winning only 15 seats in the most recent election, making it the third largest party in Scottish politics after the Scottish National Party and Labour. In UK general elections, the Conservatives have gone from a high point of being the only party to carry both a majority of votes and seats in Scotland in 1955 to a complete wipeout, winning no seats in 1997 though in 2001 there had been a single Conservative MP in Scotland, until 12 were elected in 2017.

With Labour being the sole unionist party with broad support in Scotland, the ranks of Scots among Labour politicians have over a period of four or five decades become significant. Thus, the ranks of the so-called Scottish mafia supplied the last two Labour prime ministers, Tony Blair and Gordon Brown, as well as their predecessor as head of the Labour party, John Smith.

The influential position of Scots in the Labour Party is part of the plot of the television comedy The Thick of It, in which the character of the prime minister's director of communications (or, as he is referred to by other characters, the "enforcer"), Malcolm Tucker, is portrayed as an aggressive, foul-mouthed Scotsman. Many of the members of Tucker's staff, such as his deputy, Jamie MacDonald, are also belligerent Scotsmen.

In January 2024, with Labour likely to return to power at the 2024 general election, combined with the SNP's decline in the polls in Scotland. Labour's Shadow Secretary of State for Scotland Ian Murray, claimed that Scottish Labour MPs will run Westminster after the election and would be "a major percentage" in an administration led by Keir Starmer which would give them "massive influence". A month later at the Scottish Labour Conference in Glasgow. The Leader of the Scottish Labour Party, Anas Sarwar, in his conference speech claimed that he want to send a government where they send Scottish Labour MPs who will "sit in government round the table and help make decisions." Such comments could lead to the political revival of the term.

== Cabinet Ministers ==
The so-called Scottish mafia consists of two generations, the first generation are those who were MPs prior to the collapse of Scottish Labour at the 2015 general election and served under the 1997–2010 Labour Government, the second generation are mostly those who are elected as MPs at the 2024 general election in the Scottish Labour revival. Scots who were first elected as Labour MPs including those in non-Scottish constituencies during the intermediate period also became part of the second generation.

=== First generation ===
Name	Birthplace	Constituency	UK Government positions	Labour Party positions
Tony Blair	Edinburgh	Sedgefield (1983–2007) (constituency not in Scotland)	Prime Minister (1997–2007)	Leader of the Labour Party (1994–2007)
Gordon Brown	Giffnock	Dunfermline East (1983–2005); Kirkcaldy and Cowdenbeath (2005–15)	Chancellor of the Exchequer (1997–2007); Prime Minister (2007–10)	Leader of the Labour Party (2007–10)
Derry Irvine, Baron Irvine of Lairg	Inverness	Member of the House of Lords	Lord Chancellor (1997–2003)	
Alistair Darling	Hendon (not born in Scotland)	Edinburgh Central (1987–2005); Edinburgh South West (2005–15)	Chief Secretary to the Treasury (1997–98); Secretary of State for Work and Pensions (1998–2002); Transport Secretary (2002–06); Scottish Secretary (2003–06); Secretary of State for Trade and Industry (2006–07); President of the Board of Trade (2006–07); Chancellor of the Exchequer (2007–10)	
David Clark	Castle Douglas	Colne Valley (1970–74) (constituency not in Scotland); South Shields (1979–2001) (constituency not in Scotland)	Minister for the Cabinet Office (1997–98); Chancellor of the Duchy of Lancaster (1997–98)	
Robin Cook	Bellshill	Edinburgh Central (1974–83); Livingston (1983–2005)	Foreign Secretary (1997–2001); Leader of the House of Commons (2001–03); Lord President of the Council (2001–03)	
George Robertson	Port Ellen	Hamilton (1978–97); Hamilton South (1997–99)	Defence Secretary (1997–99)	
Donald Dewar	Glasgow	Aberdeen South (1966–70); Glasgow Garscadden (1978–97); Glasgow Anniesland (1997–2000)	Scottish Secretary (1997–99)	Leader of Scottish Labour (1999–2000)
Gavin Strang	Crieff	Edinburgh East (1970–97) and (2005–10); Edinburgh East and Musselburgh (1997–2005)	Transport Minister (1997–98)	
John Reid	Bellshill	Motherwell North (1987–97); Hamilton North and Bellshill (1997–2005); Airdrie and Shotts (2005–10)	Scottish Secretary (1999–2001); Northern Ireland Secretary (2001–02); Minister without Portfolio (2002–03); Leader of the House of Commons (2003); Lord President of the Council (2003); Health Secretary (2003–05); Defence Secretary (2005–06); Home Secretary (2006–07)	Chairman of the Labour Party (2002–03)
Helen Liddell	Coatbridge	Monklands East (1994–97); Airdrie and Shotts (1997–2005)	Scottish Secretary (2001–03)	
Charlie Falconer, Baron Falconer of Thoroton	Edinburgh	Member of the House of Lords	Secretary of State for Justice (2003–07); Lord Chancellor (2003–07)	
Ian McCartney	Lennoxtown	Makerfield (1987–2010) (constituency not in Scotland)	Minister without Portfolio (2003–06)	Chairman of the Labour Party (2003–06)
Des Browne	Stevenston	Kilmarnock and Loudoun (1997–2010)	Chief Secretary to the Treasury (2005–06); Defence Secretary (2006–08); Scottish Secretary (2007–08)	
Douglas Alexander	Glasgow	Paisley South (1997–2005); Paisley and Renfrewshire South (2005–15); Lothian East (2024–present)	Transport Secretary (2006–07); Scottish Secretary (2006–07); Minister for the Cabinet Office (2006–07); Chancellor of the Duchy of Lancaster (2006–07); Secretary of State for International Development (2007–10)	
Yvette Cooper	Inverness	Pontefract and Castleford (1997–2010) (constituency not in Scotland); Normanton, Pontefract and Castleford (2010–24) (constituency not in Scotland); Pontefract, Castleford and Knottingley (2024–present) (constituency not in Scotland)	Chief Secretary to the Treasury (2008–09); Secretary of State for Work and Pensions (2009–10); Home Secretary (2024–present)	
Jim Murphy	Glasgow	Eastwood (1997–2005); East Renfrewshire (2005–15)	Scottish Secretary (2008–10)	Leader of Scottish Labour (2014–15)
Pat McFadden	Glasgow	Wolverhampton South East (2005–present) (constituency not in Scotland)	Chancellor of the Duchy of Lancaster (2024–present)	
Ian Murray	Edinburgh	Edinburgh South (2010–present)	Scottish Secretary (2024–present)	

=== Second generation ===
Name	Birthplace	Constituency	UK Government positions	Labour Party positions
Anneliese Dodds	Aberdeen	Oxford East (2017–present) (constituency not in Scotland)	Minister of State for Development (2024–present); Minister of State for Women and Equalities (2024–present)	Chair of the Labour Party (2021–24)

== Other uses ==
The term has also been applied to the group of Scottish footballers who won several domestic and European honours in the 1960s and 70s while playing for the English first division club Leeds United; namely goalkeeper David Harvey (1965–1980, 1982–1984), defender Gordon McQueen (1972–1978), midfielder Billy Bremner (1959–1976)), left winger Eddie Gray (1965–1983), right winger Peter Lorimer (1963–1979, 1983–1986) and striker Joe Jordan (1970–1978).

In the city of Dunedin New Zealand the "Tartan Mafia" is used to describe the group of aging businessmen who are purported to run the city from behind the scenes. The business community do not disown this usage.

== See also ==
- West Lothian question
- Devolved English parliament
- Miami Mafia
