= Devolution in England =

Transfer of powers to areas of England

Current framework

Governing tiers
- National authorities: UK Government (Note: The UK Government currently exercises executive functions for England.); UK Parliament (Note: There is currently no devolved English Parliament. The UK Parliament legislates for England.)
- Strategic authorities: Combined authorities; Combined county authorities; Greater London Authority

Legislation
- Established: Local Democracy, Economic Development and Construction Act 2009 (Note: The Local Democracy, Economic Development and Construction Act 2009 established the legal framework for combined authorities.)
- Other legislation: Cities and Local Government Devolution Act 2016 (Note: Established directly elected mayors for the Combined Authorities); Levelling-up and Regeneration Act 2023 (Note: Established a new form of authority the Combined County Authority); English Devolution and Community Empowerment Act 2026 (Note: Established the Strategic authority legal category)

UK Government oversight
- Department: Cabinet Office (Note: This UK Department is responsible for overseeing the implementation of devolution in England)

Previous structures
- Regional bodies: Regional assemblies; Regional development agencies

Devolution in England describes the process of the UK Government granting more powers to the subdivisions of England. These subdivisions are, most recently, the twenty strategic authorities, which include the Greater London Authority, the thirteen combined authorities, and the six combined county authorities. All of them, except the Greater London Authority, are groupings of local authorities in parts of England.

The concept of transferring powers to parts of England was first raised in 1912 by Winston Churchill, as part of his proposal for a federal system. In the later half of the 20th century, concepts of provincial or regional governance were explored, with nine Government Office Regions created in 1994, and eight of them having regional chambers in 1998. The lone exception, Greater London, had the devolved Greater London Authority established in 2000 following a 1998 referendum. However, plans for devolution to the other eight regions of England were abandoned following a defeat in a 2004 referendum in North East England.

Subsequently, the eight regional assemblies were abolished by 2010, and were followed by the introduction of the "combined authorities", with the first one set up in Greater Manchester in 2011. From 2016, the role of a directly-elected mayor leading an authority was introduced, followed by a new form of body, a combined county authority, from 2023. Since 2026, combined authorities, combined county authorities, and the Greater London Authority are all designated as a form of "strategic authority". The Starmer government planned for all parts of England to be covered by a strategic authority with a mayor. The mayoral strategic authorities sit on the Council of the Nations and Regions and the Mayoral Council for England.

Unlike Northern Ireland, Scotland and Wales, England does not have its own national devolved legislature or government and is therefore subject to the administration of the UK Government in most executive areas and entirely subject to the UK Parliament in Westminster in all legislative areas. There have been proposals for a national devolved body, as well as other proposals for devolved bodies in different unofficial regions or counties of England.

== History ==
=== 1912–1973 ===
Devolution for England was proposed in 1912 by the Member of Parliament for Dundee, Winston Churchill, as part of the debate on Home Rule for Ireland. In a speech in Dundee on 12 September, Churchill proposed that the government of England should be divided up among regional parliaments, with power devolved to areas such as Lancashire, Yorkshire, the Midlands and London as part of a federal system of government.

The division of England into provinces or regions was explored by several post-Second World War royal commissions. The Redcliffe-Maud Report of 1969 proposed devolving power from central government to eight provinces in England. It recommended the abolition of all existing two-tier councils and council areas in England and replacing them with 58 new unitary authorities alongside three metropolitan areas (Merseyside, 'Selnec', and the West Midlands). These would have been grouped into eight provinces with a provincial council each. The report was initially accepted "in principle" by the government.

In 1973 the Royal Commission on the Constitution proposed the creation of eight English appointed regional assemblies with an advisory role; although the report stopped short of recommending legislative devolution to England, a minority of signatories wrote a memorandum of dissent which put forward proposals for devolving power to elected assemblies for Scotland and Wales, and five regional assemblies in England.

=== Government Office Regions and regional devolution (1994–2012) ===
Formal regions of England used since 1994

In April 1994, the government of John Major created a set of nine Government Office Regions which established a uniform pattern of geographic regions for all government departments to use to coordinate government service provision at a regional level within England.

In 1998, the government of Tony Blair established regional chambers for the eight regions of England outside of Greater London. These chambers were not directly elected, but members were appointed by local government and local interest groups.

Following a successful referendum in 1998, a strategic regional authority was created for Greater London, the Greater London Authority (GLA). The GLA was established in 2000 and consists of a directly elected Mayor of London and an elected London Assembly. The GLA is colloquially referred to as the City Hall and its powers include overseeing Transport for London, the work of the Metropolitan Police and the London Fire Brigade, various redevelopment corporations, and the Queen Elizabeth Olympic Park.

Regional development agencies (RDAs) were established in 1998 in all nine English regions. RDAs were made up of local councillors, business leaders, and other stakeholders and were focussed on fostering economic growth and redevelopment across England. RDAs were accountable to their regional chamber or to the GLA.

In 2001, the government published a white paper proposing to reorganise the eight regional chambers into directly elected regional assemblies. An "English Regions Network" was formed as a collective voice for England's eight regional chambers and the GLA. In a white paper published in 2002, the government proposed decentralisation of power across England similar to that done for Scotland, Wales, and Northern Ireland in 1998.

An unsuccessful referendum on establishing an elected regional assembly in North East England took place in November 2004. Plans for elected regional assemblies in the rest of England were dropped following the referendum. Regional chambers were phased out between 2008 and 2010, with some of their functions being assumed by Local authority leaders' boards. Regional development agencies were abolished in 2012.

=== City regions and strategic authority devolution (2009–present) ===
Strategic authorities in England

After the proposals for devolution to elected regional assemblies for regions outside of Greater London failed, governments have instead pursued the concept of devolution for city regions. The GLA is the only devolved area of England to remain from the old system of devolution to the nine English regions.

The 2009 Local Democracy, Economic Development and Construction Act provided the means for the creation of combined authorities, a type of strategic authority outside of Greater London. Multiple combined authorities were created in the early-to-mid-2010s, The first combined authority was established in Greater Manchester in 2011. This was initially an indirectly elected body, administered by a board of leaders of the local authorities within its area.

The Cities and Local Government Devolution Act 2016 was passed on 28 January 2016 and created an optional mayoral governance structure for the combined authorities. The Levelling-up and Regeneration Act 2023 introduced an alternative type of strategic authority outside of Greater London, the combined county authority.

Over the latter part of the 2010s and into the 2020s, the national government has progressed with proposed deals for more groups of local authorities to form combined (county) authorities. The Local Government Association keeps a register of up-to-date devolution proposals. The powers given to the combined (county) authorities are more limited than the powers of the devolved national governments; they are limited largely to the economy, transport, and planning.

In 2013, the GLA established the Devolution Working Group to oversee and further devolution in London. In 2017 the work of these authorities along with Public Health England achieved a devolution agreement with the national government in regard to some healthcare services.

Under the English Devolution and Community Empowerment Act 2026, the Greater London Authority, combined authorities and combined county authorities were formally designated as strategic authorities. The act made the process of creating new strategic authorities and devolving further powers to current strategic authorities faster and more uniform, made local government reform compulsory in all areas, and introduced spatial development strategies. Part 4 of act will establish the Local Audit Office, an independent body to oversee standards, registration of auditors and enforcement.

Strategic authorities are categorised as foundation, mayoral, and established mayoral. This indicates how developed they are as structures to receive devolved powers and funding. As of June 2026, there are twenty strategic authorities made up of thirteen combined authorities, six combined county authorities and the Greater London Authority. All strategic authorities outside Greater London were voluntarily established by their constituent councils. All but foundation strategic authorities have a strategic authority mayor.

In December 2024, the UK government published a white paper that outlined six strategic authorities to be created under the Devolution Priority Programme. As of 20 June 2026, strategic authorities have been created in four of these areas, while the following two remain in development:

- Greater Essex (Greater Essex Combined County Authority)
- Norfolk and Suffolk (Norfolk and Suffolk Combined County Authority)

== Intergovernmental ==
There are currently three intergovernmental bodies that have representation from strategic authorities that represent England at the United Kingdom level. These were created to help facilitate cooperation and policy coordination between the different groups within the English devolution framework.

=== Council of Nations and Regions ===
The Council of the Nations and Regions brings together the prime minister of the United Kingdom, first minister of Scotland, first minister of Wales, first and deputy first minister of Northern Ireland, and the 14 English strategic authority mayors.

=== Mayoral Council for England ===
The Mayoral Council for England brings together UK government ministers and England's strategic authority mayors.

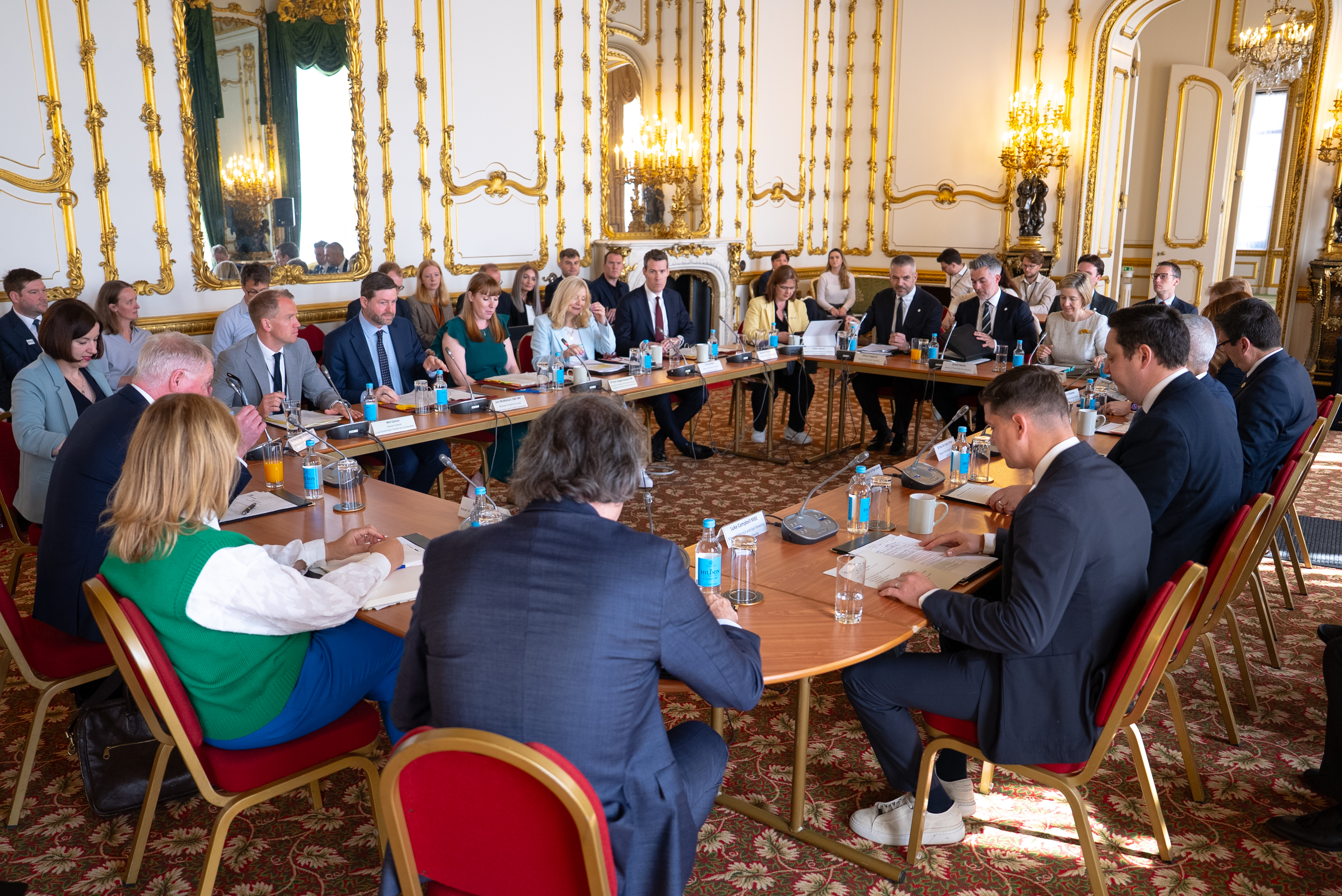
A meeting of the Mayoral Council for England, May 2025

In October 2024, the newly elected Labour government established the Mayoral Council for England, chaired by the Deputy Prime Minister, to bring together ministers from the UK government, the Mayor of London and the strategic authority mayors. As the Labour government hopes that strategic authorities will be established throughout England, the Mayoral Council would eventually evolve into an all-England forum. As of October 2024, 48% of the population and 26% of the land area of England is represented on the Mayoral Council.

The concept of a meeting of mayors had also been proposed prior to 2024. In 2012, then prime minister David Cameron proposed that directly elected mayors sit within an "English Cabinet of Mayors", chaired by the prime minister and meeting at least twice a year, giving them the opportunity to share ideas and represent their regions at national level. No further action towards establishing an English Cabinet of Mayors was taken. In 2022, Labour also proposed a similar body to be known as the "Council of England", chaired by the prime minister and bringing together strategic authority mayors, representatives of local government and other stakeholders.

=== Leaders Council ===
The Leader's Council brings together the Secretary of State for Housing, Communities and Local Government, other ministers in the UK government, and leaders of representative bodies of local government primarily in England.

=== Government ministers ===
Meetings of the Mayoral Council for England were chaired by the Secretary of State for Housing, Communities and Local Government. A junior minister for English Devolution was also first appointed in July 2024. In July 2026, prime minister Andy Burnham transferred responsibility for English devolution from the Ministry of Housing, Communities and Local Government to the newly established Number 10 North in Manchester.

A minister for London existed between 1994 and 2010 and again between 2016 and 2024. Regional ministers were appointed in the eight regions outside London between 2007 and 2010.

== Proposals ==
=== North of England ===
Northern England has a statutory transport body, Transport for the North. Multiple bodies are or have advocated for further devolution to Northern England. The Northern Powerhouse Partnership is one of these, made up of businesses and civil leaders.

In May 2025 the mayors of strategic authorities across the North of England (Greater Manchester, Hull and East Yorkshire, Liverpool City Region, North East, South Yorkshire, Tees Valley, West Yorkshire, York and North Yorkshire) launched a partnership known as The Great North. The partnership, whose brand is based on the Great North Run, will lead trade missions and focus on pan-North investment propositions including hosting a Northern investment summit.

The Northern Party was a political party established to campaign for Devolution to the North of England through the creation of a Regional Government over covering the six historic counties of the region. The Campaign aimed to create a Northern Government with tax-raising powers and responsibility for policy areas including economic development, education, health, policing and emergency services. The Northern Independence Party is a separatist, democratic socialist party founded in 2020, in response to the perceived growth of the North–South divide in England, aiming for the formation of an independent country in the north of England under the name of Northumbria, after the early medieval Anglo-Saxon kingdom of the same name. The party currently has no elected representatives in parliament.

=== North East England ===
A proposal to devolve political power to a fully elected Regional Assembly was put to public vote in the 2004 North East England devolution referendum. This, however, was defeated 78% to 22%, resulting in the cancellation of subsequent referendums planned in North West England and Yorkshire and the Humber, with the government abandoning its plans of regional devolution altogether. As well as facilitating an elected assembly, the proposal would also have reorganised local government in the area. However, the North East Mayoral Strategic Authority, covering much of the region, was formed in 2024.

=== Yorkshire ===
Arguments for devolution to Yorkshire, which has a population of 5.4 million – similar to Scotland – and whose economy is roughly twice as large as that of Wales, include focus on the area as a cultural region or even a nation separate from England, whose inhabitants share common features.

This cause has also been supported by the cross-party One Yorkshire group of 18 local authorities (out of 20) in Yorkshire. One Yorkshire has sought the creation of a directly elected mayor of Yorkshire, devolution of decision-making to Yorkshire, and giving the county access to funding and benefits similar to strategic authorities. Various proposals differ between establishing this devolved unit in Yorkshire and the Humber (which excludes parts of Yorkshire and includes parts of Lincolnshire), in the county of Yorkshire as a whole, or in parts of Yorkshire, with Sheffield and Rotherham each opting for a South Yorkshire Deal. This has been criticised by proponents of the One Yorkshire solution, who have described it as a Balkanisation of Yorkshire and a waste of resources.

The Yorkshire Devolution Movement is an associate parliamentary group campaigning for a directly elected parliament for the whole of the traditional county of Yorkshire with powers second to no other devolved administration in the UK.

The Yorkshire Party advocates for the establishment of a devolved Yorkshire Assembly within the UK, with powers over education, environment, transport and housing. In the 2019 European Parliament election, it received over 50,000 votes in the Yorkshire and the Humber constituency. In the 2021 West Yorkshire mayoral election, 2022 South Yorkshire mayoral Election, and the 2022 Wakefield By-Election, the Yorkshire Party beat major parties, being the third most voted for political party in each election.

=== South West / Wessex ===
The Wessex Regionalists are a small political party who argue for self-government for modern Wessex, which it defines accordingly to the Wessex Society as the historical counties of Berkshire, Oxfordshire, Gloucestershire, Somerset, Wiltshire, Hampshire, Devon, Dorset and the Isle of Wight. As such, the Wessex area corresponds to five of the six existing counties of the South West region (not including Cornwall) and four ceremonial counties from the South East region: Berkshire, Oxfordshire, Hampshire, and the Isle of Wight. The proposed Heart of Wessex Combined Authority will devolve power to Dorset, Wiltshire and Somerset.

=== Cornwall ===
There is a movement that supports devolution in Cornwall. A law-making Cornish Assembly is party policy for the Liberal Democrats, Mebyon Kernow, Plaid Cymru and the Greens. A Cornish Constitutional Convention was set up in 2001 with the goal of establishing a Cornish Assembly. Several Cornish Liberal Democrat MPs such as Andrew George, Dan Rogerson and former MP Matthew Taylor are strong supporters of Cornish devolution.

On 12 December 2001, the Cornish Constitutional Convention and Mebyon Kernow submitted a 50,000-strong petition supporting devolution in Cornwall to 10 Downing Street. This was over 10% of the Cornish electorate, the figure that the government had stated was the criteria for calling a referendum on the issue. In December 2007 Cornwall Council leader David Whalley stated that "There is something inevitable about the journey to a Cornish Assembly".

A poll carried out by Survation for the University of Exeter in November 2014 found that 60% were in favour of power being devolved from Westminster to Cornwall, with only 19% opposed and 49% were in favour of the creation of a Cornish Assembly, with 31% opposed.

In January 2015 Labour's Shadow Chancellor promised the delivery of a Cornish assembly in the next parliament if Labour are elected. Ed Balls made the statement whilst on a visit to Cornwall College in Camborne and it signifies a turn around in policy for the Labour party who in government prior to 2010 voted against the Government of Cornwall Bill 2008–09.

Cornwall has also been discussed as a potential area for further devolution and therefore a federal unit, particularly promoted by Mebyon Kernow. Cornwall has a distinct language and the Cornish have been recognised as a national minority within the United Kingdom, a status shared with the Scots, the Welsh, and the Irish. The electoral reform society conducted a poll which showed a majority supported more local decision making: 68% of councillors supported increased powers for councils and 65% believed local people should be more involved in the decision-making process.

In January 2025, reacting to proposals for mayoral authorities across England, Cornwall Council voted to seek a Cornwall-only devolution settlement and reject a combined authority spanning the border with Devon. Councillors and Cornwall's MPs argued that such an arrangement would fail to reflect the Cornish people's recognised national minority status. In July 2025, the council voted to call on the UK government to formally recognise Cornwall as the UK's fifth nation. The government subsequently expressed willingness to consider designating Cornwall Council, on an exceptional basis, as a single Foundation Strategic Authority, and the council's cabinet agreed to the proposed Cornwall-only arrangement in July 2026. In September 2026, Prime Minister Andy Burnham said he had asked No. 10 North to begin work with Cornwall Council and its six MPs on a devolution deal “with or without an elected mayor”.

=== Sussex ===
Cultural historian Peter Brandon called the current division of Sussex into east and west 'unnatural' and advocates the reunification of East and West Sussex while historian Chris Hare has called for a devolved regional assembly for Sussex. Former Brighton Kemptown MP, Lloyd Russell-Moyle also called for a tax-raising Sussex Parliament, with similar powers to the Senedd in Wales, and for regional representation for Sussex in a reformed House of Lords. The Sussex and Brighton Combined County Authority was formed in March 2026 and will elect its first mayor in the 2028 Sussex and Brighton mayoral election.

== Proposed further reform ==
The Good Things Foundation has called for using devolution to target digital exclusion.

Tunisha Kapoor, the leader of UK100's Clean Air Network, has called for clean air to be built into the devolution settlement.

== See also ==
- Devolution in the United Kingdom
- Federalism in the United Kingdom
- Politics of England
- Governance of England
