= Galligan =

Galligan is a surname. Notable people with this surname include:

- Claire Galligan, American freestyle swimmer
- Danielle Galligan (born 1992), Irish actress and theatre maker
- Devin Galligan (died 2003), founder of the charitable organization "Strain the Brain"
- John Galligan (1865–1937), American baseball player
- Mike Galligan (born 1968), Irish sportsperson
- Peter Paul Galligan (1888–1966), Irish politician
- Pete Galligan (1860–1917), American politician and baseball player
- Rory Galligan (1973–2012), Irish rally car driver
- Roseanne Galligan (born 1987), Irish athlete
- Shane Galligan, American drag queen and musician, stage name Thorgy Thor
- Tom Galligan (college president) (born 1955), American lawyer, legal scholar, administrator and educator
- Tom Galligan (mayor) (born 1946), mayor of Jeffersonville, Indiana, US
- Walter T. Galligan (1925–2010), American Air Force lieutenant general
- Yvonne Galligan, Irish political scientist and consultant
- Zach Galligan (born 1964), American actor, Gremlins

== See also ==
- Galga
- Galgan
