= McKay Commission =

The McKay Commission may refer to:

- the New York State Special Commission on the Attica Prison riot in 1971–1972
- the Commission on the consequences of devolution for the House of Commons in 2012–2013
