= International relations of the Greater London Authority =

The international relations of the Greater London Authority are carried out by the Mayor of London as part of the mayor's responsibility to promote Greater London's global links.

London is generally considered to be a global city.

== Agreements ==
=== Ken Livingstone ===
During his mayoralty, Ken Livingstone signed city partnerships during his terms with; Beijing, Delhi, Moscow, New York City, Paris and Tokyo.

Ken Livingstone signed a deal with the government of Venezuela so that buses in London would operate on fuel imported from Venezuela, and in return the Greater London Authority would open an office in Venezuela to work on recycling, waste management, reducing carbon emissions and traffic. The agreement led to a reduction of 20% in the cost of fuel, and allowed for the fares paid by individuals on income support to be halved. The agreement was signed in February 2007. The reduction in fares affected roughly 250,000 people and took effect in August 2007.

=== Boris Johnson ===
During his mayoralty, Boris Johnson signed partnership agreements with New York City, Paris and Tokyo.

Johnson chose not to renew the agreement with Venezuela.

=== Sadiq Khan ===
Sadiq Khan signed a 2018 partnership agreement with the Mayor of Paris on tourism.

== Intergovernmental relations ==
During its membership, the London Assembly nominated one member to the Chamber of Regions of the Congress of Local and Regional Authorities.

The Greater London Authority is an associate member of Eurocities and a member of the Commonwealth Local Government Forum.

== International offices ==
Under Ken Livingstone, the GLA maintained overseas offices: in Brussels (in conjunction with London Councils), Beijing/Shanghai and Delhi/Mumbai. Livingstone also opened a consultancy in Caracas and hired a consultant in Moscow.

As part of his reduction of the GLA's budget, Boris Johnson pledged to review overseas offices. Staff from the offices were transferred into London and Partners, a tourism and inward investment body, which replaced Visit London, Think London and Study London, which had been three separate bodies. In July 2012, only the Beijing and Brussels offices remained operational.

== See also ==
- Foreign relations of the United Kingdom
- International relations of England
