= Grand committee =

A grand committee has a different meaning in different countries. For example, in Finland, the Grand Committee is a committee of the Parliament of Finland. In the United Kingdom Grand Committees are made up of all MPs from each of the constituent countries.

== Finland ==
The Grand Committee (Finnish: suuri valiokunta) is a committee of the Parliament of Finland. It has special tasks related to Finland's membership in the European Union. It formulates the opinion of the parliament in questions of EU legislation. (Foreign and security policy is an exception, being handled by the Foreign Affairs Committee). In addition, the Grand Committee deliberates the Bills that are referred to it after their first reading at a plenary session.

The Grand Committee also debates Bills that are referred to it by the plenary session of the Parliament. This happens very rarely.

The Grand Committee has 25 members and 13 alternate members.

== United Kingdom ==
In the House of Commons of the United Kingdom, the grand committees are committees which are made up of all MPs from each of the constituent countries, together with some other MPs who are co-opted onto the committee.

- Northern Ireland Grand Committee
- Scottish Grand Committee
- Welsh Grand Committee

In the House of Lords, Grand Committee is a meeting of the House as a whole, but away from the Floor of the House. A Grand Committee operates similarly to a Committee of the Whole House, except that no votes can take place, so amendments must be unanimously agreed upon. House of Lords Grand Committees may consider Bills or statutory instruments (usually but not always instruments that later require approval on the Floor of the House under the affirmative resolution procedure), or debate particular issues or topics.

== United States ==
=== Rhode Island ===
A few of the powers of the Rhode Island General Assembly can only be exercised if it meets as a whole, House of Representatives and Senate together, and such a meeting is known as a grand committee.
