= Northern Ireland Grand Committee =

UK Parliament committee

The Northern Ireland Grand Committee is one of three such grand committees in the United Kingdom Parliament. The other two are for Scotland and Wales. The membership of the committee includes all participating Northern Irish MPs, as well as up to 25 other MPs who are nominated by the Committee of Selection.

The purpose of the committee is to read bills that are relevant to Northern Ireland before their second or third readings in Parliament. It also provides an opportunity for MPs to question ministers, debate current matters and for ministers to make statements. There are between three and six committee meetings per year.

Until recently, unlike its Scottish and Welsh counterparts, the Northern Ireland Grand Committee met at Westminster and never in Northern Ireland. However, the Democratic Unionist Party pressed for a meeting to take place in Northern Ireland itself. The government agreed, and in December 2006 the first local meeting of the committee took place in the council chamber at Belfast City Hall. The committee met again in Northern Ireland in September 2013, this time in the Senate Chamber at Parliament Buildings, Stormont.

== See also ==
- Parliamentary committees of the United Kingdom
- Northern Ireland Affairs Select Committee
- Scottish Grand Committee
- Welsh Grand Committee
- Regional Affairs Committee (England)
