= Welsh Grand Committee =

Committee of the British Parliament

The Welsh Grand Committee (Welsh: Uwch Bwyllgor Cymreig), is a committee of the House of Commons of the United Kingdom. It is one of three such grand committees in the United Kingdom Parliament; the other two are for Scotland and Northern Ireland. The committee is made up of all 40 Welsh MPs and up to five other MPs. Since 1996, the committee is governed by Standing Order numbers 102 to 108, which set out its remit and composition.

The committee can meet after a King's Speech or budget statement to consider the impact the legislation and finances outlined would have on Wales. It also provides an opportunity for MPs to question ministers and debate current matters, and for ministers to make statements. There are between three and six committee meetings per year.

== History ==
Initial attempts at setting up a Grand Committee for Wales were made in 1888 and again in the mid-1890s; however both attempts were unsuccessful.

The proposal was revived in 1958 by Ness Edwards MP, and was accepted by the Procedure Committee in 1959. On 5 April 1960, an order was made in the House of Commons establishing it. The first meeting of the Grand Committee took place on 11 May 1960.

Proceedings of the Welsh Grand Committee were conducted in English only until February 2017, when translation facilities were installed allowing proceedings to be conducted bilingually in English and in Welsh.

The Welsh Grand Committee usually meets at the Palace of Westminster in London but does occasionally meet in Wales itself. It met in Mold in June 1997, at County Hall, Aberaeron, in February 1998, at County Hall, Cwmbran, in March 2001 and at the Guildhall, Wrexham, in October 2011.

== See also ==
- List of committees of the Parliament of the United Kingdom
- Welsh Affairs Select Committee
- Northern Ireland Grand Committee
- Scottish Grand Committee
- Regional Affairs Committee (England)
