= West Lothian question =

UK constitutional anomaly

The West Lothian question, also known as the English question, is a political issue in the United Kingdom. It concerns the question of whether members of Parliament (MPs) from Northern Ireland, Scotland and Wales who sit in the House of Commons should be able to vote on matters that affect only England, while neither they nor MPs from England are able to vote on matters that have been devolved to the Northern Ireland Assembly, the Scottish Parliament and the Senedd (Welsh Parliament). The term West Lothian question was coined by Enoch Powell MP in 1977 after Tam Dalyell, the Labour MP for the Scottish constituency of West Lothian, raised the matter repeatedly in House of Commons debates on devolution.

In 2011 the UK Government set up the Commission on the consequences of devolution for the House of Commons, chaired by Sir William McKay, former Clerk of the House of Commons, to examine the question. The commission published a report in 2013 which proposed various procedural changes, including the recommendation that legislation which affects only England should require the support of a majority of MPs representing English constituencies. This recommendation was known as English votes for English laws. Following the election of a Conservative majority government in the 2015 general election, new parliamentary procedures and a Legislative Grand Committee were enacted to bring it into effect. The measures were subsequently abolished in 2021, returning to the previous status quo that still remains.

== Background ==
The equivalent question was raised by the opponents of Irish Home Rule in defeating William Gladstone's first (1886) and second (1893) home rule bills. Basil Williams enumerated four schemes which Gladstone proposed at various stages:

1. Total exclusion of Irish members.
2. Inclusion of Irish members, in reduced numbers, for all purposes.
3. Inclusion of Irish members, in their full numbers, for certain specified purposes – the "In and Out" clause.
4. Inclusion of Irish members, in their full numbers, for all purposes – the Omnes Omnia ("all for everything") clause.

The "West Lothian question" itself was first posed in 1977 during a British House of Commons debate about Scottish and Welsh devolution proposals. In the 14 November sitting, Tam Dalyell, the Labour MP for the Scottish constituency of West Lothian, asked,

For how long will English constituencies and English Honourable members tolerate ... at least 119 Honourable Members from Scotland, Wales and Northern Ireland exercising an important, and probably often decisive, effect on English politics while they themselves have no say in the same matters in Scotland, Wales and Northern Ireland?

To illustrate his point, Dalyell chose the example of a member of Parliament for West Lothian who could vote on matters affecting the English town of Blackburn, Lancashire, but not on matters concerning Blackburn, West Lothian in his own constituency. The name "West Lothian question" was later coined by the Ulster Unionist MP Enoch Powell in a response to Dalyell's speech, when he said "We have finally grasped what the Honourable Member for West Lothian is getting at. Let us call it the West Lothian question." The question is more commonly assumed to refer to the anomaly that came into being in 1999, with Scottish, Welsh and Northern Ireland members at Westminster allowed to vote upon English matters, but MPs for English constituencies having no influence on affairs which were devolved to Scotland, Wales or Northern Ireland. Dalyell was a vocal opponent of Scottish devolution in the 1979 and 1997 plebiscites. A devolved Scottish Parliament was created in 1999 after a clear majority voted in favour of devolution in the second referendum.

=== Legal status ===
The Scottish Parliament was formed by statute, the Scotland Act 1998, and is thus a creation of Westminster. No sovereign status on the Scottish Parliament is conferred, and the act has not changed the status of the Westminster Parliament as the supreme legislature of Scotland, with Westminster retaining the ability to override, or veto, any decisions taken by the Scottish Parliament. The Westminster Parliament remains the sovereign body; powers are devolved rather than transferred to the Scottish Parliament. The ability of all Westminster MPs to vote on Scottish legislation has not been legally diminished by devolution, as made clear by Section 28(7) of the Scotland Act 1998, which states that the legislative powers of the Scottish Parliament do "not affect the power of the Parliament of the United Kingdom to make laws for Scotland".

Legislation relating to reserved issues such as defence, national security, foreign policy and monetary and economic issues are voted on by all the MPs at Westminster to ensure consistency across the whole of the United Kingdom. The Scottish Parliament is not able to pass laws on these issues itself, as they were not devolved. The West Lothian question is not involved in this situation, as all parts of the Union have a say roughly proportional to their population and all are equally affected.

During devolution, a convention was created to manage the power of Westminster to legislate on matters within the legislative competence of the Scottish Parliament. This is known as the Sewel Convention, and the related Scottish parliamentary motions are now known as legislative consent motions (previously Sewel motions). These motions (of which there are around a dozen per year) allow MPs to vote on issues which, among other things, are within the Scottish Parliament's legislative competence. The Sewel Convention states that the Westminster Parliament will not normally legislate on devolved matters in Scotland without first obtaining the consent of the Scottish Parliament. The convention formally recognised in the Scotland Act 2016 by adding section 28(8) to the Scotland Act 1998, reading "But it is recognised that the Parliament of the United Kingdom will not normally legislate with regard to devolved matters without the consent of the Scottish Parliament."

== English votes for English laws (EVEL) ==
During the 2000s a number of pieces of legislation which affected only or mainly England were passed by the UK Parliament, although the votes cast by MPs were such that the legislation would not have been passed if only the votes cast by MPs representing English constituencies had been counted. The opposition Conservative Party commissioned a report, "Devolution, The West Lothian Question and the Future of the Union", which proposed some procedural changes restricting the participation of MPs representing non-English constituencies during the passage of bills relating only to England.

While the Conservatives were in government from 2010 to 2015 in coalition with the Liberal Democrats, they set up the McKay Commission to look into the question. The Commission proposed that bills in the House of Commons which affected England solely or differently should require a majority vote of MPs representing English constituencies. The Conservative manifesto for the 2015 general election included a proposal that England-only legislation should require approval from a Legislative Grand Committee prior to its Third Reading in the House of Commons. Having won a majority in that election, the Conservative government used a change in standing orders in October 2015 to give MPs representing English (or English and Welsh) constituencies a "veto" over laws affecting only England (or only England and Wales). Thus, a new law could no longer be imposed only on England by a majority of all MPs if a majority of English MPs were opposed. However, a proposed new law could still be vetoed by a majority of all MPs even if a majority of English MPs were in favour.

The measures were abolished in 2021, with the government saying that they had "added complexity and delay to the legislative process" and that their removal would allow all MPs to be represented equally. Although Labour welcomed the move, some Conservative backbenchers expressed concern that this simply recreated the previous problem. The abolishment of EVEL reverted the situation to the previous status quo, which remains today.

== Other possible answers to the question ==
=== Reversal of devolution ===
Reversion of all devolved powers, and abolition of the devolved administrations. No voting member from one region would have power over another region, wherein the voting members of that other region do not have reciprocal rights; all regions would be treated equally.

=== English devolution ===
==== English parliament or assembly ====
The creation of a devolved English parliament or assembly, with full legislative powers, akin to the Scottish Parliament is seen by some as a solution to this problem, with full legislative powers also being conferred on the existing Welsh Parliament. The Westminster (United Kingdom) Parliament would continue to meet and legislate on matters of UK-wide competence such as Defence, Foreign Affairs and economic matters with the parliaments of England, Wales, Scotland and Northern Ireland legislating locally. In the early-20th-century context of Irish home rule, the equivalent option was dubbed Home Rule All Round.

Lord Falconer, the former Secretary of State for Constitutional Affairs, has stated that he believes that an English Parliament would "dwarf all other institutions." Peter Hain, who campaigned for a Welsh Assembly, warned that creating an English parliament or trying to stop Scottish and Welsh MPs from voting on England-only matters would break up the Union. Chuka Umunna suggested in July 2015 that the Labour Party should support the creation of a separate English parliament, as part of a federal United Kingdom.

==== Regional assemblies ====
The Labour government of Tony Blair attempted to address part of the West Lothian question by introducing English regional assemblies with no legislative powers. Originally, it was planned that these would be directly elected. The London Assembly was the first of these, established following a referendum in 1998, in which public and media attention was focused principally on the post of Mayor of London. Ken Livingstone was the first directly elected mayor of London. He started his victory speech with "As I was saying before I was so rudely interrupted 14 years ago", making it clear he saw the London Assembly as a recreation of a similar London wide authority to that of the Greater London Council, which he had led before it was abolished in the 1980s.

Further progress was thwarted when a referendum in the North East rejected the proposal for an elected assembly in November 2004 leading to the shelving of similar proposals for other English regions. The Regional Development Agencies were all scrapped by March 2012 with their powers and functions being transferred either to local government or in the case of London, the Greater London Authority.

==== Increased powers to English counties and cities ====
Douglas Carswell and Daniel Hannan have proposed that all the powers currently devolved to the Scottish Parliament should also be devolved to the English counties and cities. This would mean that the situation of Scottish MPs voting on policy which only affected England would no longer arise, because parliament would no longer be responsible for areas of policy which affected only England. Therefore, parliament would have to choose to make policy either for the United Kingdom as a whole, or not at all. Carswell and Hannan write: "All the fields of policy currently within the purview of the Holyrood Parliament should be transferred to English counties and cities (thereby, incidentally, answering the west Lothian Question)."

==== Council of England ====
In 2022, Labour proposed a body to be known as the "Council of England", chaired by the prime minister, to bring together combined authority mayors, representatives of local government and other stakeholders. The Council of England would be complemented by a "Council of the UK" made up of the UK prime minister and the first ministers of the devolved governments and a "Council of the Nations and Regions" which would bring together the UK central government, devolved administrations, and representatives from the different parts of England, Scotland, Wales and Northern Ireland. The three bodies would be supported by their own intergovernmental secretariat.

In 2024, the new Labour government established a UK wide Council of the Nations and Regions and an England only Mayoral Council including ministers from the UK government, the Mayor of London and mayors of England's combined authorities. Unlike the proposed "Council of England", the Mayoral Council does not include representatives from local government in areas without a combined authority.

==== English territorial office and secretary of state ====
The Labour Party manifesto for the 2017 general election included a commitment to establish the post of a "Minister for England" within the Department of Communities and Local Government who would work alongside the existing secretaries of state for Scotland, Wales and Northern Ireland.

A 2022 report by the Electoral Reform Society suggested the establishment of an "England Office" to act as a representative for English regional and local government to the UK government and serve to coordinate between central and local government on English devolved matters. It also called for an "English Leaders' Forum" to bring together UK ministers with combined authority mayors, single local authority mayors and council leaders.

In a report titled Devolving English Government published in April 2023, to counter what they described as over-centralisation and a democratic deficit in England, the Institute for Government and the University of Cambridge's Bennett Institute for Public Policy proposed the establishment of an "Office for England" led by a "Secretary of State for England" and the formation of an "English Devolution Council". The existing Ministry for Housing, Communities and Local Government would be split into a Department for Housing and Communities and an Office for England, which would take on responsibility for oversight of devolved and local governance in England. The Secretary of State for England would chair a cabinet committee for England including other secretaries of state from departments whose remits mainly apply to England only. The English Devolution Council would include the Mayor of London and existing combined authority mayors. An interim mechanism would be put in place for the participation of local leaders in areas of England without a combined authority. The role of the council would be to debate issues related to local and regional governance in England, to call ministers and experts to provide evidence and to advise the UK central Government on English affairs.

=== Dissolution of the Union ===
Another solution might be the dissolution of the United Kingdom leading to some or all of the countries of the United Kingdom (England, Northern Ireland, Scotland, and Wales) becoming independent sovereign states. The Scottish National Party (SNP), which campaigns for Scottish independence, won an outright majority in the Scottish Parliament in the 2011 Scottish election. A referendum was held on 18 September 2014, with voters rejecting independence by 55% to 45%. In Wales, Welsh Nationalist party Plaid Cymru holds Welsh independence as a long-term aim, while Propel, formerly the Welsh National Party, more aggressively campaigns for independence. In Northern Ireland there are no mainstream political parties calling for an independent Northern Irish state, but parties calling for a united Ireland include Sinn Féin and the Social Democratic and Labour Party (SDLP).

=== Reducing the number of Scottish MPs ===
During the existence of the Parliament of Northern Ireland (1921–1972), the number of MPs elected from Northern Ireland to Westminster was below the standard ratio of MPs compared with the rest of the UK. During periods when the predominantly unionist MPs from Northern Ireland deprived Labour of working majorities, Conservatives supported the principle that "every member of the House of Commons is equal to every other member of the House of Commons". Scotland traditionally enjoyed a greater number of MPs per head of population than the rest of the UK, but this advantage was reduced significantly at the 2005 UK general election. An argument against the idea of having a lower number of MPs, in return for more devolved powers, is that if the national parliament takes important decisions (such as waging war) then people should be fully represented.

== See also ==
- Asymmetric federalism – Imbalance of powers as between members
- Barnett formula – Share due to devolved administrations
- British national identity – State or quality of embodying British characteristics
- Campaign for an English Parliament – English pressure group
- Cornish nationalism – Nationalist movement in the United Kingdom
- Democratic deficit – When an institution falls short of upholding the people's power in and over itself
- Devolved English parliament – Proposed institution in the UK
- English nationalism – Nationalism that asserts that the English are a nation
- Federalism in the United Kingdom – Proposed constitutional reform of a division of powers
- Legislative consent motion – Consent to UK law affecting devolved matter
- Parliament of England – Legislature of England, c. 1236 to 1707
- Proportional representation – Voting system that makes outcomes proportional to vote totals
- Scottish devolution – Since 1707 Acts of Union to present day
- Scottish mafia – Group of Scottish Labour Party MPs
- Scottish independence – Political movement for Scotland leaving the UK
- Welsh nationalism – Nationalism in Wales
