= Claire Galligan =

American swimmer

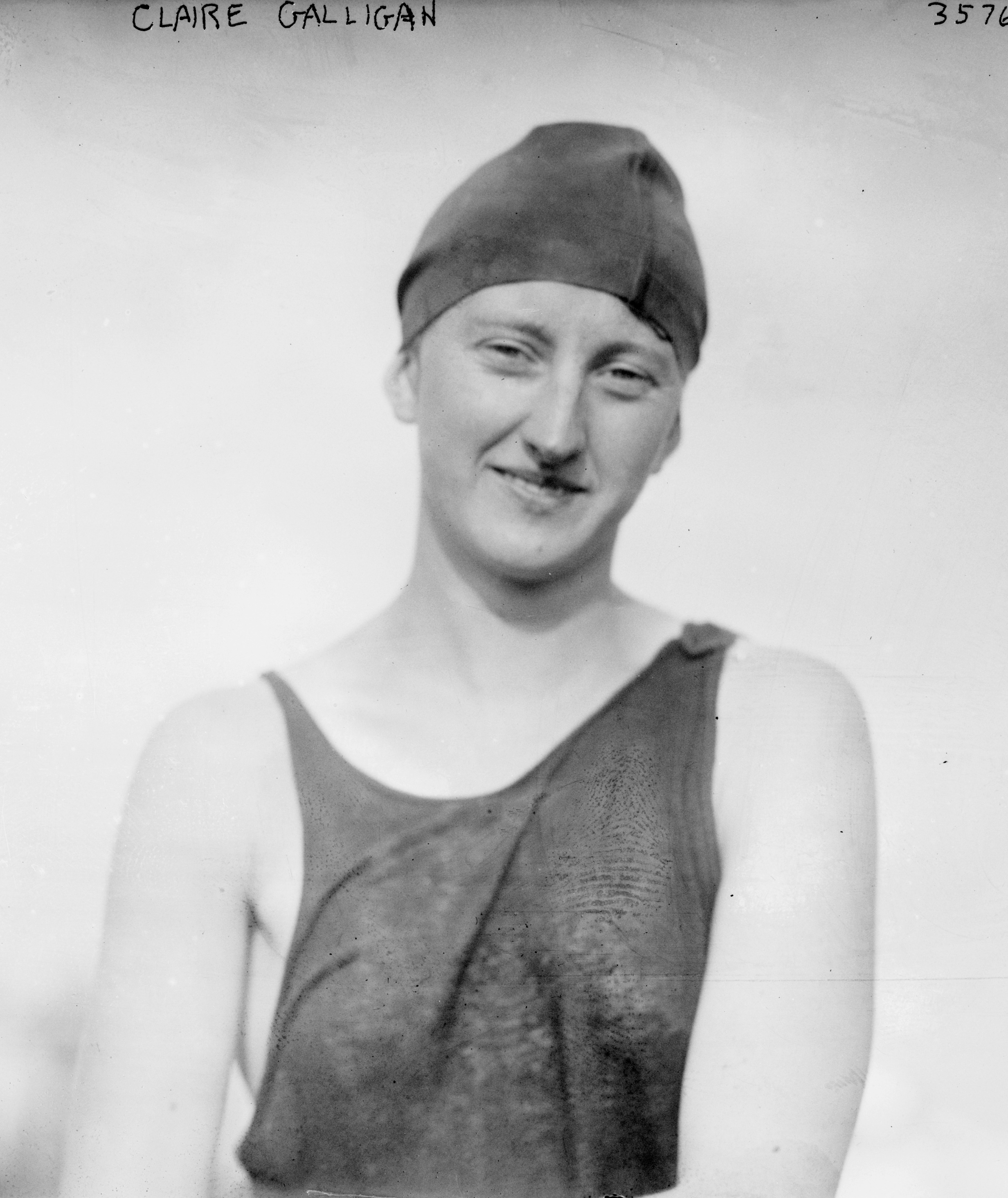
- Galligan in 1915

Personal information
- Born: September 24, 1895 New York, U.S.
- Died: October 8, 1978 (aged 83) Los Angeles, California, U.S.

Sport
- Sport: Swimming
- Club: Women's Life Saving League; New York's Women's Swimming Association
- Coach: Johnny Curran, Jim Riley, L. de B. Handley

Claire Agnes Galligan (September 24, 1895, in New York – October 8, 1978, in Los Angeles, California) was an American freestyle swimmer who won 13 AAU championships over distances ranging from 220 yd to 3 miles. In 1916 she became the first female AAU champion, and on September 13, 1917, she set a world record over 500 yd at 7:31.4. She missed the 1916 Olympics due to World War I, and by the 1920 Games was married to Edgar Finney and retired from swimming. In 1970 she was inducted into the International Swimming Hall of Fame.

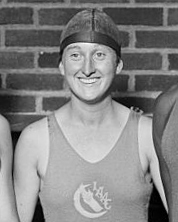
Claire Galligan c1920

== See also ==
- List of members of the International Swimming Hall of Fame
