= Scottish Grand Committee =

Committee of the UK House of Commons

The Scottish Grand Committee is a committee of the House of Commons. It is not a select committee (see Scottish Affairs Select Committee), but rather a grand committee composed of all 59 Scottish MPs (72 MPs prior to 2005).

The Scottish Grand Committee's function is to oversee UK Parliament bills specific to Scotland.

For several years it met at the Old Royal High School in Edinburgh.

== History ==
It has its origins in a Scottish standing committee set up in 1907 to consider the Committee Stage of exclusively Scottish bills. Its remit was widened in 1948 to include consideration of bills "in relation to their principle" and up to six days of Estimates debates. In 1957 up to two days of Matter Day debates was added and Committee Stage consideration was transferred to a small Scottish Standing Committee.

In operation bills under debate were normally limited to Scottish MPs, but voting was open to all UK parliamentarians. So in practice at decision time, UK MPs for other home nations would fill the chamber and often vote down any proposals put forward by the Scottish MPs.

In July 1994, a number of new procedures were introduced in the SGC which provided for:

- questions to be asked of the Secretary of State
- statements by, and subsequent questions to, any Minister of the Crown
- substantive debates on the adjournment
- half-hour adjournment debates at the end of each sitting (chosen by ballot)
- the power to meet in Scotland

However, since the creation of the Scottish Parliament none has been presented, and consequently the Committee has met only occasionally since. It is not a defunct body, however, as a Scotland-only UK Parliament bill is still theoretically possible.

The retention of the Scottish Grand Committee was agreed by the House of Commons on 21 October 1999. The Committee last met in November 2003.

In February 2020, the Scottish National Party suggested that regular meetings of the Scottish Grand Committee be revived to ensure that the actions of the UK Government in relation to Scotland are properly scrutinised.

=== Chairmen ===
- 1987–1997 Michael Martin (Labour)
- 1997–2001 John Maxton (Labour)
- 2001–2003 Various chairmen

== See also ==
- Parliamentary committees of the United Kingdom
- Scottish Affairs Select Committee
- Northern Ireland Grand Committee
- Welsh Grand Committee
- Regional Affairs Committee (England)
