= Yvonne Galligan =

Irish political scientist

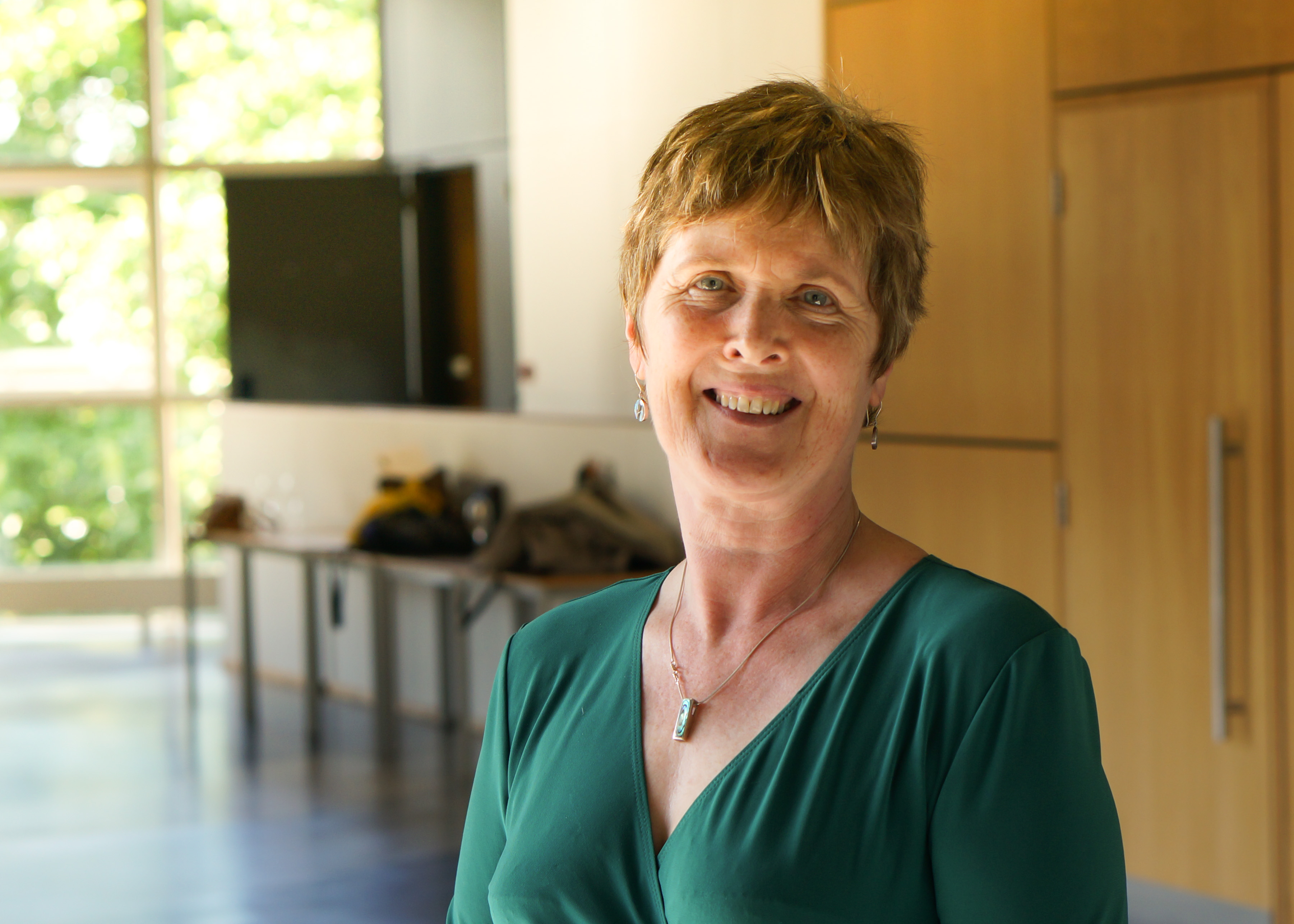
- Occupation: Political scientist

Yvonne Galligan OBE is an Irish political scientist and consultant who used to teach at Queen's University Belfast in Northern Ireland. She holds a Ph.D. in Political Science from Trinity College Dublin.

Galligan is a Professor of Comparative Politics, Founding Director of the Centre for Advancement of Women in Politics and Director of University Gender Initiative at Queen’s University.

Galligan has published on gender equality issues in public life, writing texts such as Contesting Politics: Women in Ireland, North and South. Galligan has served as an advisor to political parties, governments, parliaments, universities and international bodies on measures to gender balance political representation.

In Ireland, Galligan's research in 2012 created the foundations for the introduction of the 2012 Electoral Funding (Political Parties) Act, which allowed for candidate gender quotas.

In the United Kingdom, Galligan served in 2013 as a member of the Commission on the consequences of devolution for the House of Commons (the McKay Commission). Galligan was also independent chairperson of the Markievicz Commission in Ireland on measures to implement the candidate gender quota of 30%, in 2014.

Galligan was awarded an OBE in the Birthday 2014 Honours List for services to Higher Education. In 2015, she received an Honorary Fellowship from Trinity College Dublin. In 2017, Galligan was honored with an honorary doctorate by the University of Edinburgh. for her outstanding work in equality and diversity, which was awarded alongside Justin Trudeau.

In 2024, she was made a member of the Royal Irish Academy.
