= Community Health Partnerships =

British health organisation

Community Health Partnerships (formerly Partnerships for Health) is a Department of Health owned company in the United Kingdom. Its role was to set up public-private partnerships to invest in new healthcare facilities in England via the NHS Local Improvement Finance Trust programme.

The company was established in 2001 as Partnerships for Health, a joint venture between the Department of Health and Partnerships UK. In December 2006, the Department of Health acquired the full shareholding of the partnership and it was renamed Community Health Partnerships in November 2007.

Its current portfolio is over 300 buildings which include NHS foundation trusts, general practitioners, dentists, and pharmacies. This is about 5% of the NHS’ estate in England. In most cases ownership is shared by CHP which normally holds 40% and various private companies which have 60% ownership.

In 2019 it was reported that its proposals for a new form of private finance initiative were being considered by Princess Alexandra Hospital NHS Trust for the rebuilding of its hospital in Harlow.

The 25-year contractual terms for the first batch of LIFT buildings will expire in 2029. No new ownership or funding model has been agreed between the NHS and private sector after the government's policy of using private finance initiatives ended in 2018.

In 2020 it was managing 300 health clinics and 13 community hospitals.
