= Regional Affairs Committee =

The Regional Affairs Committee is a general committee of the House of Commons of the United Kingdom that considers any matter related to regional affairs in England that may be referred to it. The Committee comprises thirteen MPs from English constituencies, although any MP representing an English constituency may participate in its debates and proceedings. In that way it is similar to the Northern Ireland, Scottish, and Welsh Grand Committees. Also like those committees, provision is made for it to meet away from Westminster.

== History ==
The committee in its present form was created by House of Commons Standing Order 117 in 2000 as the Standing Committee on Regional Affairs, superseding an earlier standing committee established in 1975. It last met in June 2004. No members have been appointed since the 2005–10 Parliament.

The standing order establishing the Regional Affairs Committee was suspended between 2009 and 2010 when Regional Grand Committees and Regional Select Committees were established by temporary standing orders. In May 2010, the Leader of the House of Commons, Sir George Young, said that the Government would not reintroduce the temporary standing orders for the regional select committees.

During the present parliament elected in 2024, Standing Order 117 remains valid and the committee continues to exist, however as of October 2024, no appointments have been made to it.

== See also ==
- Mayoral Council for England
- List of committees of the United Kingdom Parliament
  - Regional Grand Committees
  - Regional Select Committees
  - Legislative Grand Committees
