= NHS Shared Business Services =

NHS Shared Business Services (NHS SBS) is a joint venture company in the United Kingdom between NHS Business Services Authority (NHS BSA), the French IT services company Sopra Steria, and, formerly, the Department of Health (DoH). It provides back office services such as accounting, procurement, payroll and managed IT to NHS organisations.

NHS SBS was formed in 2005 to provide a more efficient method of supplying business services to the National Health Service (NHS); by supplying many trusts it claims to have achieved cost savings of 30% due to benefits from economies of scale, with a target of saving £1bn by 2020.

== Loss of patient data ==
In February 2017, The Guardian reported that NHS England is holding an inquiry into reports that more than 500,000 pieces of patient data sent between GPs and hospitals went undelivered over the five years from 2011 to 2016, including investigating cases where loss and delay of the data may have harmed patients. The documents are reported to have been mistakenly stored in a warehouse by NHS Shared Business Services, "working as a kind of internal postal service within the NHS in England" until March 2016.

In October 2017, the total number of documents lost was reported to be 864,000.
