= Regulator of Social Housing =

Agency overview
- Type: Non-ministerial government department
- Jurisdiction: England
- Headquarters: Leeds, England
- Agency executive: Jonathan Walters, Chief Executive
- Parent department: Ministry of Housing, Communities and Local Government
- Website: www.gov.uk/rsh

The Regulator of Social Housing is a non-departmental public body that regulates registered providers of social housing in England. This function was transferred from the Homes and Communities Agency in October 2018, by the Legislative Reform (Regulator of Social Housing) (England) Order 2018. Until April 2012 it was performed by the Tenant Services Authority. It is sponsored by the Ministry of Housing, Communities and Local Government. The body is headquartered in Leeds, but will relocate to a new government hub in Manchester when it opens.

It maintains a list of registered social housing providers, such as housing associations.

It has challenged the business model of some providers where rent income from housing benefit payments is less than lease expenditure.

The regulator operates a system of financial viability grading for housing providers. In November 2022 it reduced its financial viability grading for 19 housing associations, because of higher inflation and borrowing costs, and a weakening housing market.

== See also ==
- Public housing in the United Kingdom
- Council house
- Scottish Housing Regulator
