= Commission on the consequences of devolution for the House of Commons =

Independent commission

The Commission on the consequences of devolution for the House of Commons, also known as the McKay Commission, was an independent commission established in the United Kingdom to consider issues arising from devolution in the United Kingdom and their effect on the workings of the House of Commons. In the statement made by the government when setting up the commission, it referred to the West Lothian question, a term coined in 1977 to refer to anomalies existing in the pre-devolution government of the UK.

The commission, chaired by Sir William McKay, considered changes to the procedures of the House of Commons in relation to legislation that only affects part of the UK. It started its work in February 2012 and reported in March 2013. It recommended that future legislation affecting England but not other parts of the UK should require the support of a majority of MPs sitting for English constituencies.

== Background ==
The term "West Lothian question" refers to issues concerning the former ability of members of parliament from constituencies in Northern Ireland, Scotland and Wales to vote on matters that affect only people living in England and therefore have no direct consequence on their constituents, whilst being unable to influence matters that affect their own constituencies. Anomalies of this kind are considered to have been made more apparent by the devolution of power from Westminster to the National Assembly for Wales, the Northern Ireland Assembly and the Scottish Parliament.

The Conservative Party manifesto for the 2010 general election included a commitment to introduce the idea of "English votes for English laws" and the party had previously explored this issue through a taskforce led by Kenneth Clarke. Scottish Conservative Sir Malcolm Rifkind has also written about the issue, proposing an English grand committee as a possible solution. The Liberal Democrat manifesto included a commitment to address the status of England as part of wider UK constitutional reforms. The 2010 coalition agreement between the parties included a commitment to establish a commission to examine the West Lothian question.

Plans for a commission were announced in September 2011 and its membership was disclosed in January 2012.

== Membership ==
The commission was set up with six members, described "independent, non-partisan" experts. The members were:

- Sir William McKay, former Clerk of the House of Commons
- Sir Geoffrey Bowman, former First Parliamentary Counsel (resigned 20 June 2012)
- Sir Stephen Laws, retiring First Parliamentary Counsel
- Sir Emyr Jones Parry, former UK Ambassador to the United Nations
- Prof Charlie Jeffery of the University of Edinburgh Academy of Government
- Prof Yvonne Galligan of Queen's University Belfast

== Terms of reference ==
The terms of reference for the commission were:

To consider how the House of Commons might deal with legislation which affects only part of the United Kingdom, following the devolution of certain legislative powers to the Scottish Parliament, the Northern Ireland Assembly and the National Assembly for Wales.

== Publication of report ==
The report of the commission was published on 25 March 2013. Its main conclusions are:

- "Evidence suggests that people in England feel unhappy with present arrangements, which take too little account of their grievances. A response is necessary.
- "Decisions taken in the Commons which have a separate and distinct effect for England (or England-and-Wales) should normally be taken only with the consent of a majority of MPs sitting for constituencies in England (or England-and-Wales).
- "That principle should be clearly set out in a resolution of the House of Commons, and House procedure should be changed to encourage MPs to follow this approach.
- "A range of procedural changes is suggested, all of which would allow the English voice to be heard. Some of them involve committees on bills, with majorities reflecting the party balance in England (or England-and-Wales). Others take the form of motions on the floor of the House. They are not a single package but a menu from which choices can be made to suit the circumstances of a particular bill.
- "A select committee on Devolution should be appointed, which would (among other things) assist the House to hold UK ministers to account for their responsibilities in connection with devolution and their relations with the devolved administrations.
- "Under the Commission's recommendations, no MPs would be prevented from voting on any bill, and the right of the House as a whole to make final decisions would be preserved. However, there would also be scope for additional roles for MPs from England (or England-and-Wales)."

Sir William McKay said:

Our proposals retain the right of a UK-wide majority to make the final decisions where they believe UK interests or those of a part of the UK other than England should prevail. We expect that governments will prefer compromise to conflict.

== See also ==
- Governance of England
- Devolved English parliament
