= English votes for English laws =

Procedure in UK Parliament (2015–2021)

English votes for English laws (EVEL) was a set of procedures of the House of Commons of the Parliament of the United Kingdom whereby legislation that affected only England required the support of a majority of MPs representing English constituencies. The procedures were in place between 2015 and 2021. They were developed following devolution in the United Kingdom as a result of the West Lothian question, a concern about the perceived inequity of MPs from Northern Ireland, Scotland and Wales, sitting in the House of Commons being able to vote on matters that affected only England, while MPs from England were unable to vote on matters that had been devolved to the Northern Ireland Assembly, the Scottish Parliament and the Senedd.

During the 2000s a number of pieces of legislation which affected only or mainly England were passed by the UK Parliament, although the votes cast by MPs were such that the legislation would not have been passed if only the votes cast by MPs representing English constituencies had been counted. The opposition Conservative Party in 2008 commissioned a report, "Devolution, The West Lothian Question and the Future of the Union", which proposed some procedural changes restricting the participation of MPs representing non-English constituencies during the passage of bills relating only to England.

While the Conservatives were in government from 2010 to 2015 in coalition with the Liberal Democrats, they set up the McKay Commission to look into the question. The Commission proposed that bills in the House of Commons which affected England solely or differently should require a majority vote of MPs representing English constituencies. The Conservative manifesto for the 2015 general election included a proposal that England-only legislation should require approval from a Legislative Grand Committee prior to its Third Reading in the House of Commons. Having won a majority in that election, the Conservative government used a change in standing orders in October 2015 to give MPs representing English constituencies a "veto" over laws only affecting England.

The system of English Votes for English Laws was suspended in April 2020, and abolished by Boris Johnson's Conservative government in July 2021, returning to the previous system with no special mechanism for English laws.

== Background ==
Following the establishment of the Scottish Parliament in 1999, it was suggested by Conservative MPs that Scottish MPs should be barred from voting on matters that do not affect Scotland. In July 1999, Conservative Party leader William Hague said that "English MPs should have exclusive say over English laws ... People will become increasingly resentful that decisions are being made in England by people from other parts of the UK on matters that English people did not have a say on elsewhere ... I think it is a dangerous thing to allow resentment to build up in a country. We have got to make the rules fair now."

In establishing foundation hospitals and increasing student tuition fees in England, Scottish votes were decisive in getting the measures through. The vote on foundation hospitals in November 2003 only applied to England – had the vote been restricted to English MPs then the government would have been defeated. Had there been a vote by English MPs only on tuition fees in January 2004, the government would have lost because of a rebellion on their own benches. Students at English universities are required to pay top-up fees, but students from Scotland attending Scottish universities are not. The legislation imposing top-up fees on students in England passed by a small majority of 316 to 311. At the time, the shadow education secretary Tim Yeo argued that this low majority made the passing of the law "completely wrong" due to Scottish MPs voting to introduce tuition fees that Scottish students attending university in Scotland would not have to pay. A small part of the bill did relate directly to Scotland.

Following his election as Leader of the Conservative Party in 2005, David Cameron established a "Democracy Taskforce" chaired by Kenneth Clarke. The taskforce's final report "Devolution, The West Lothian question and the Future of the Union" proposed a possible solution to the West Lothian question. The proposals called for changes in procedures in the House of Commons for the passage of bills relating only to England. Under the new procedures, all MPs would participate in the first and second readings of these bills, but only English MPs would participate in the committee stage consideration of the bill. All MPs would vote on the final bill at report stage. An amendment proposed by Malcolm Rifkind suggested that the second reading and report stages of bills would require a "double majority" of both the House as a whole and of English MPs.

Labour politician Jack Straw has speculated: "I say to the Conservatives that if they start to take a mechanical approach, this so-called 'English votes for English laws' approach, then they will break the Union."

== McKay Commission ==
The May 2010 coalition agreement between the Conservative Party and the Liberal Democrats provided for a commission to be established to consider the West Lothian question. In September 2011, the Government announced that the commission would be established in the near future and that it would consist of "independent, non-partisan experts". The new commission would examine how the House of Commons and Parliament as a whole could deal with business that affects only England and is devolved in Scotland, Wales and Northern Ireland. The commission would not look at reducing the number of MPs from the other three constituent countries or financing of the devolved institutions.

The McKay Commission reported on 25 March 2013. It concluded that changes were needed because of the perception that England was disadvantaged under the current devolution arrangements, and proposed that Commons decisions with a "separate and distinct effect" for England should "normally be taken only with the consent of a majority of MPs sitting for constituencies in England". This principle should be enshrined by a resolution of the House of Commons. The commission also proposed a number of changes to procedure, including allocating specific parliamentary time to proposals for England. The government said it would give the report "serious consideration".

On 18 September 2014, the people of Scotland voted against independence in a referendum by 55.3% to 44.7%. Shortly after the outcome of the vote was announced, the Prime Minister, David Cameron, stated that the "question of English votes for English laws – the so-called West Lothian question – requires a decisive answer." He announced the appointment of Lord Smith to lead a commission to develop proposals for constitutional reform to be included in a Bill to be published in January 2015. Labour refused to engage in cross party discussions about the issue.

== Legislative grand committees (2015–2021) ==
The governance of England featured in the 2015 general election manifestos of the three main political parties in England. The Conservative manifesto supported the idea of "English Votes for English Laws", with England-only legislation requiring approval from a Legislative Grand Committee prior to its Third Reading. In the case of legislation applying to both England and Wales, or to England, Wales and Northern Ireland, the Legislative Grand Committee would consist of MPs from both England and Wales or England, Wales and Northern Ireland. It proposed a separate English rate of Income Tax and rejected regional governance in England.

The Labour Party manifesto stated that it was time to "consider how English MPs can have a greater role in scrutiny of legislation that only affects England" and suggested that an English Grand Committee stage for legislation could be considered. The Liberal Democrat manifesto proposed that England-only legislation be considered by a committee of MPs with membership based on share of the vote in England. It proposed a system of "Devolution on Demand" where councils or groups of councils could request further powers from Central Government. It supported the principle of an assembly for Cornwall.

The Conservatives won an overall majority in the election and formed the government of the United Kingdom. On 2 July 2015, Chris Grayling, Leader of the House of Commons, announced proposals to change standing orders to give MPs representing English constituencies a new "veto" over laws only affecting England. On 9 July 2015, Grayling said that, following two days of debate in July, a final set of standing orders would be tabled and voted on after the summer recess. Labour said the "reckless and shoddy" plans had descended into "chaos" while the SNP said it was a "shambles". The new procedures were approved by a Commons vote in October 2015 and used for the first time in the House of Commons in January 2016.

The revised process was:

- The Speaker judged which parts of a bill related to just England, or England and Wales
- An England-only committee stage considered bills deemed "England-only in their entirety"
- Membership of this committee reflected the number of MPs each party had in England
- Where sections of legislation related only to England, England and Wales, or England Wales and Northern Ireland, the agreement of a Legislative Grand Committee composed of all English, English and Welsh or English, Welsh and Northern Irish MPs was required

In November 2016 the Centre on Constitutional Change published a report on the operation of the procedures during their first year, arguing that EVEL had avoided many of the problems predicted by its critics and recommending some improvements. As a result of the 2017 general election, the Conservative Party lost its House of Commons majority, but had a majority of 60 on English issues. The Conservatives later regained a majority of 81 seats in the 2019 general election, at the same time winning 345 out of the 533 seats in England.

Use of the EVEL mechanism was suspended in April 2020 to streamline parliamentary procedures during the COVID-19 pandemic. In June 2021 Michael Gove, the Minister for the Cabinet Office, speaking to The Times newspaper proposed abolition of the EVEL mechanism, saying: "Ultimately, it's a convention which arose out of a set of circumstances after the 2014 referendum, where you had a coalition government... We’ve moved on now."

On 13 July 2021, the House of Commons approved the government's motion to abolish the legislative grand committees, with the government claiming this would remove unnecessary complication. Although Labour welcomed the move, some Conservative backbenchers expressed concern that this simply recreated the previous problem.
