= Devolved English parliament =

Proposed institution in the UK

A devolved English parliament is a proposed institution that would give separate decision-making powers to representatives for voters in England, similar to the representation given by the Senedd (Welsh Parliament), Scottish Parliament and Northern Ireland Assembly.

Public opinion surveys have resulted in widely differing conclusions on public support for the establishment of a devolved English parliament.

Devolution in England is currently distributed among sub-national areas, called strategic authorities, rather than a national body.

== Background ==
The future prospects of a devolved English Parliament have been raised in relation to the West Lothian question, which came to the fore after devolutionary changes to British parliaments. Before 1998, all political issues, even when only concerning parts of the United Kingdom, were decided by the British Parliament at Westminster. After separate regional parliaments or assemblies were introduced in Scotland, Wales, and Northern Ireland in 1998, issues concerning only these parts of the United Kingdom were often decided by the respective devolved assemblies, while purely English issues were decided by the entire British Parliament, with MPs from Scotland, Wales and Northern Ireland fully participating in debating and voting. The establishment of a devolved English parliament, giving separate decision-making powers to representatives for voters in England, has thus become an issue in British politics.

During general elections, all of the single-member constituencies (seats) that constitute the UK Parliament are subject to separate, simultaneous contests, between several candidates. While these constituencies span the entire UK geographically, because of the way that the population of the UK is distributed – i. e. the population of England is greater than that of Northern Ireland, Scotland and Wales combined – the 533 MPs from English constituencies represent a majority within the House of Commons. Nevertheless, there are often occasions when the votes of MPs from non-English constituencies have proved to be decisive with regard to England-specific legislation (regarding matters that are devolved outside England). (Examples of this phenomenon since devolution include issues such as foundation hospitals, top-up fees and runways at Heathrow.) To a limited extent, the Scotland Act 1998 has reduced the potential for non-English MPs to form decisive regional blocs – that is, Section 81 of the Act abolished the previous system of apportionment, under which Scottish constituencies required a smaller electoral quota and Scotland was over-represented, relative to the other components of the UK; England now provides more MPs per capita than Scotland.

Surveys of public opinion on the establishment of an English parliament have given widely varying conclusions. In the first five years of devolution for Scotland and Wales, support in England for the establishment of an English parliament was low at between 16 and 19 %, according to successive British Social Attitudes Surveys. A report, also based on the British Social Attitudes Survey, published in December 2010 suggests that only 29 % of people in England support the establishment of an English parliament, though this figure had risen from 17 % in 2007. One 2007 poll carried out for BBC Newsnight, however, found that 61 % would support such a parliament being established.

While the Conservatives were in government from 2010 to 2015 in coalition with the Liberal Democrats, the coalition government approved the creation of the McKay Commission to look into the question. The Commission proposed that bills in the House of Commons which affected England solely or differently should require a majority vote of MPs representing English constituencies, a system known as English votes for English laws (EVEL).

In October 2021, a poll by Public First found that 62% of English voters would vote for an English Parliament. Furthermore, an even bigger majority of 'English identifiers' – 72% – want laws that only apply in England to be made by MPs elected in England, whilst 64% of all English voters, including 'British identifiers', thought the same.

=== Mayoral Council for England ===
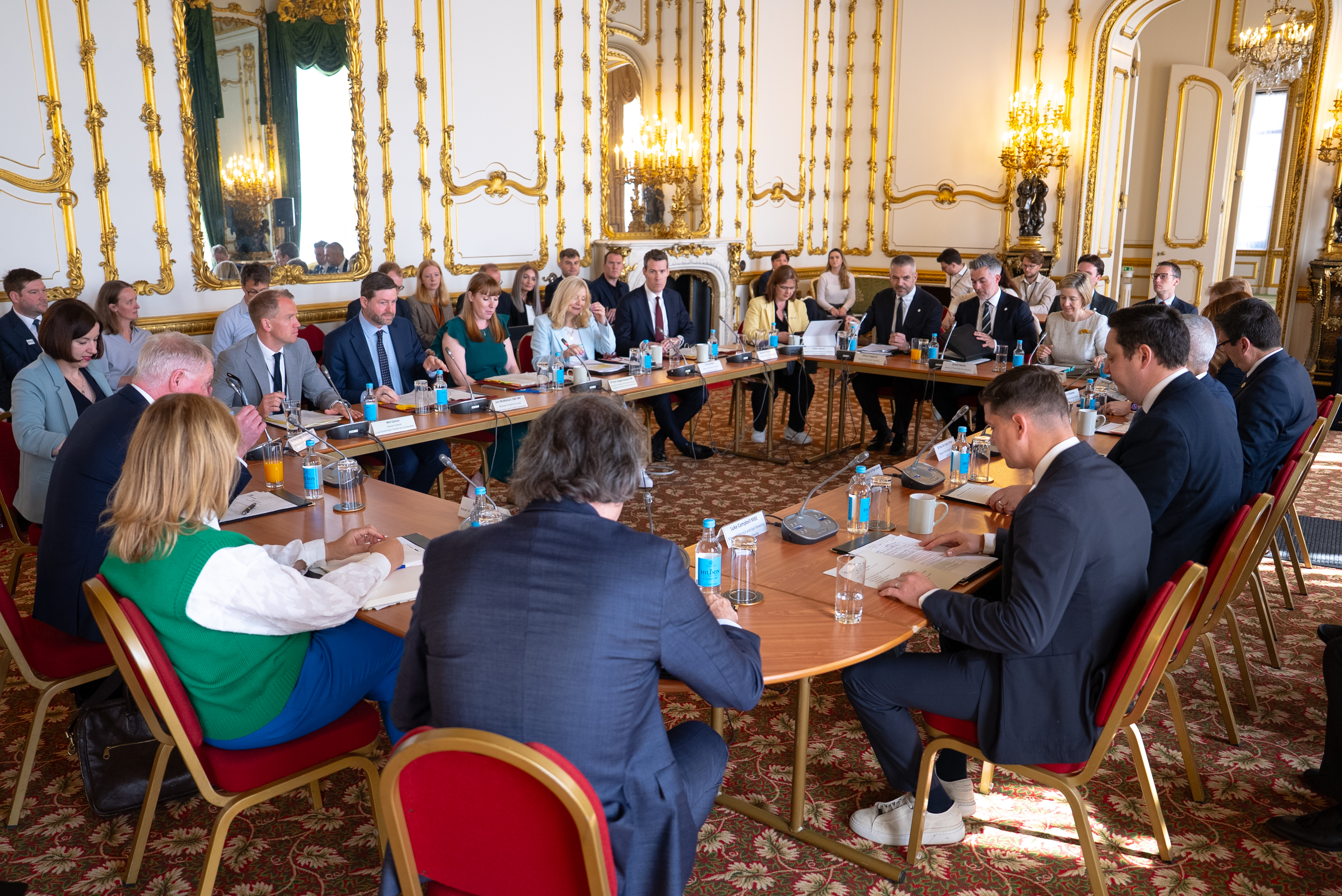
A meeting of the Mayoral Council for England, May 2025

In 2022, former prime minister Gordon Brown proposed the establishment of a "Council of England" which would be chaired by the prime minister and would include leaders of combined authorities, the Mayor of London, representatives of local government and other stakeholders in England. The proposed council would be similar to the Council for Wales which existed between 1949 and 1966. In 2024, the new Labour government established an England only forum known as the Mayoral Council for England to bring together ministers from the UK government, the Mayor of London and Mayors of England's Combined Authorities. As the Labour government hopes that combined authorities will be established throughout England, the Mayoral Council would eventually evolve into an all England forum. As of October 2024, 48% of the population and 26% of the land area of England is represented on the Mayoral Council.

== Positions taken by political parties ==
=== Conservatives ===
The Conservative Party manifesto for the 2015 general election included a proposal that England-only legislation should require approval from a Legislative Grand Committee prior to its Third Reading in the House of Commons. Having won a majority in that election, the Conservative government used a change in standing orders in October 2015 to give MPs representing English constituencies a "veto" over laws only affecting England. EVEL was scrapped in July 2021 by Boris Johnson.

=== Labour ===
The Labour Party has opposed the idea of English Votes for English Laws, arguing that this creates two classes of MPs in the House of Commons, and that a regional approach should be taken, in the form of regional English devolution.

In July 2015, then Shadow Secretary of State for Business, Chuka Umunna, suggested that the Labour Party should support the creation of a separate English parliament as part of a federal United Kingdom. He also called for a federal structure to the Labour Party with the creation of a distinct English Labour Party.

Labour's manifesto for the 2017 general election included a commitment to establish the post of a "Minister for England" within the Department of Communities and Local Government. Proposals for a "Council of England" featured in a 2022 Labour Party report on constitutional reform by Gordon Brown titled A New Britain: Renewing our Democracy and Rebuilding our Economy. The proposed council would be chaired by the prime minister and would include leaders of combined authorities, the mayor of London, representatives of local government and other stakeholders in England.

Following Labour's victory in the 2024 general election, Keir Starmer established a Mayoral Council for England bringing together the UK ministers, the Mayor of London, and combined authority mayors.

=== Liberal Democrats ===
The English Liberal Democrats is the state party within the federal Liberal Democrats which operates in England.

In January 2012, Simon Hughes, the deputy leader of the Liberal Democrats, supported calls for a devolved English parliament.

In 2021 the Liberal Democrats adopted a policy motion, "A Framework for England in a Federal UK", calling for the establishment of regional assemblies throughout England which would nominate members to concurrently serve on an "English National Chamber" to legislate at an all-England level with England remaining as a single legal jurisdiction within a federal United Kingdom.

=== Others ===
Flag of the Campaign for an English Parliament

Other political parties which have campaigned for an English Parliament are the English Democrats, and the UK Independence Party (UKIP). Electoral support for English nationalist parties is low, however, even though there is public support for many of the policies they espouse. The English Democrats gained just 64,826 votes in the 2010 UK general election, accounting for 0.3 % of all votes cast in England.

Since 1997, the Campaign for an English Parliament (CEP) has been campaigning for a referendum on an English Parliament. Several groups are working to raise this issue of a devolved English parliament include the English Constitutional Convention and English Commonwealth.

== Public opinion ==
A 2007 poll of 1,953 people throughout Great Britain carried out for BBC Newsnight, found 61% support among the English for a parliament of their own, with 51% of Scots and 48% of Welsh people favouring the same. An earlier ICM poll of 869 English people in November 2006 produced a slightly higher majority of 68% backing the establishment of such a body.

A 2014 poll by Cardiff and Edinburgh universities found that 54% of English people surveyed agreed with a devolved parliament, while 20% neither agreed nor disagreed, 15% disagreed, and 10% were undecided.

=== Opinion polls ===
Polling data for English devolution, English votes for English laws and independence may be found in the table below.

Note: Responses with the plurality of the vote are outlined in bold and are coloured in, those with at least 50% of the vote have more saturated colours.

Date	Independence	Status quo	English parliament	English votes for English laws	Regional assemblies	End devolution	Don't know /none
4 July 2002	N/A	N/A	**47%**	N/A	28%	N/A	25%
7 August 2006	N/A	32%	**41%**	N/A	14%	N/A	13%
4 May 2007	N/A	12%	21%	**51%**	N/A	N/A	16%
12 June 2007	15%	**32%**	20%	25%	N/A	N/A	8%
1 July 2007	N/A	41.22%	**51.42%**	N/A	N/A	N/A	7.36%
1 August 2007	N/A	32%	**61%**	N/A	N/A	N/A	7%
30 April 2009	N/A	15%	41%	N/A	N/A	N/A	**44%**
9 September 2009	N/A	20%	**58%**	N/A	N/A	N/A	22%
12 June 2011	N/A	21%	**52%**	N/A	N/A	14%	13%
12 January 2013	N/A	16%	**49%**	N/A	N/A	N/A	35%
10 April 2015	N/A	20%	**68%**	N/A	N/A	N/A	12%
7 April 2019	N/A	24.25%	**67.32%**	N/A	N/A	N/A	8.43%
6 February 2023	N/A	23.76%	11.88%	**46.53%**	10.89%	N/A	6.93%
6 November 2023	N/A	25.35%	**68.43%**	N/A	N/A	N/A	6.22%

=== British Social Attitudes research ===
The British Social Attitudes surveys have collated data on the question of English devolution since 1999, it has given participants three options.

Note: Responses with the plurality of the vote are outlined in bold and are coloured in, those with at least 50% of the vote have more saturated colours.

Date	Governed as it is now	England to have its own Parliament	Each region to have its own assembly
1999	62%	18%	15%
2000	54%	19%	18%
2001	57%	16%	23%
2002	56%	17%	20%
2003	56%	18%	26%
2004	53%	21%	21%
2005	54%	18%	20%
2006	54%	21%	18%
2007	57%	17%	14%
2008	51%	26%	15%
2009	49%	29%	15%
2010	53%	23%	13%
2011	56%	25%	12%
2012	56%	22%	15%
2013	56%	19%	15%
2015	50%	20%	23%
2018	52%	22%	18%
2020	55%	22%	20%

== See also ==
- Devolution in the United Kingdom
- Mayoral Council for England
- English nationalism
- English independence
- Asymmetric federalism
