= Local Audit Office =

Planned English local auditing body

Agency overview
- Type: Executive non-departmental public body
- Jurisdiction: England
- Parent department: Ministry of Housing, Communities and Local Government
- Website: https://www.gov.uk/government/organisations/local-audit-office

The Local Audit Office (LAO) is a planned statutory body of the Ministry of Housing, Communities and Local Government in the UK Government, to oversee the auditing of local government in England.

== Background ==
The Labour government published a consultation on 18 December 2024 entitled Local audit reform: a strategy for overhauling the local audit system in England. The consultation paper proposed the creation of a new public body called the Local Audit Office. The reform was supported by the Institute of Chartered Accountants in England and Wales. Provisions to establish the LAO are found in part 4 of the English Devolution and Community Empowerment Act 2026.

== Operations ==
The LAO will be a statutory and independent arm’s-length body of the Ministry of Housing, Communities and Local Government.

The first chair was Bill Butler, former chair of the Public Sector Audit Appointments. The first Controller of Local Audit was Adrian Crompton, a former Auditor General for Wales, appointed on an interim basis. As of 4 November 2026, secondary legislation is still necessary to formally establish the body.

== See also ==
- National Audit Office (United Kingdom)
- Audit Commission (United Kingdom)
- Audit Wales
- Audit Scotland
- Northern Ireland Audit Office
