= Unionism in the United Kingdom =

Support for continued unity of the UK

The United Kingdom is composed of four constituent countries: England, Scotland, Wales and Northern Ireland.

In the United Kingdom, unionism is a political stance favouring the continued unity of England, Scotland, Wales and Northern Ireland as one sovereign state; the United Kingdom of Great Britain and Northern Ireland. Those who support the union are referred to as Unionists. Though not all unionists are nationalists, UK or British unionism is associated with British nationalism, which asserts that the British are a nation and promotes the cultural unity of the Britons, which may include people of English, Scottish, Welsh, Irish, Cornish, Jersey, Manx and Guernsey descent.

Since the late 20th century, differing views on the constitutional status of the countries within the UK have become a bigger issue in Scotland, Northern Ireland, and to a lesser extent in Wales. Sinn Fein and the Social Democratic and Labor Party, formed in 1905 and 1970, both function in Northern Ireland and advocate for Irish Unity. In 2010 Sinn Fein achieved a majority in the Northern Irish Legislative Assembly for the first time. The pro-independence Scottish National Party first became the governing party of the Scottish Parliament in 2007, and it won an outright majority of seats at the 2011 Scottish Parliament election. This led to a referendum on Scottish independence in 2014, where voters were asked: "Should Scotland be an independent country?" 44.7% of voters answered "Yes" and 55.3% answered "No", with a record voter turnout of 84.5%.

== Formation of the Union ==
In 1542, the crowns of England and Ireland had been united through the creation of the Kingdom of Ireland under the Crown of Ireland Act 1542. Since the 12th century, the King of England had acted as Lord of Ireland, under papal overlordship. The act of 1542 created the title of "King of Ireland" for King Henry VIII of England and his successors, removing the role of the Pope as the ultimate overlord of Ireland. The crowns of England and Scotland were united in 1603, when James VI of Scotland succeeded his cousin Elizabeth I in England.

The Kingdom of Great Britain was formed on 1 May 1707 through the Acts of Union 1707, two simultaneous acts passed by the parliaments of England and Scotland. These created a political union between the Kingdom of England (consisting of England and Wales) and the Kingdom of Scotland. This event was the result of the Treaty of Union that was agreed on 22 July 1706. The Acts created a single Parliament of Great Britain at Westminster as well as a customs and monetary union. However, England and Scotland remained separate legal jurisdictions.

With the Act of Union 1800, the Kingdom of Ireland united with Great Britain into what then formed the United Kingdom of Great Britain and Ireland. The history of the Union is reflected in various stages of the Union Jack, which forms the flag of the United Kingdom. Ireland left the United Kingdom in 1922, however the separation of Ireland which originally occurred under the Government of Ireland Act 1920 was upheld by the British Government and the Unionist-controlled devolved Parliament of Northern Ireland, and chose to remain within the state today, which is now officially termed the United Kingdom of Great Britain and Northern Ireland. The 300th anniversary of the union of Scotland and England was marked in 2007.

== Support for the Union ==
=== England ===
In England, support for the Union has traditionally been high, while support for a separate English state has conversely been relatively low. However, the rise of English nationalism has seen a decrease in support for the United Kingdom, although English nationalism does not necessarily advocate English independence from the United Kingdom. In November 2006, an ICM poll, commissioned by the Sunday Telegraph, showed that support for full English independence had reached 48% of those questioned. However, two polls conducted in 2007 and 2013 showed that English support for the Union was stable and high, with 78% opposed to English independence in 2013.

=== Scotland ===
In 2014, a referendum for Scottish independence was held. Voters were asked: "Should Scotland be an independent country?" 44.7% of voters answered "Yes" and 55.3% answered "No", with a record voter turnout of 84.5%. Chief counting officer Mary Pitcaithly stated: "It is clear that the majority of people voting have voted No to the referendum question." Results were compiled from 32 council areas, with Glasgow backing independence—voting 53.5% "Yes" to 46.5% "No" (turnout in the area was 75%)—and Edinburgh voting against independence by 61% to 39% (turnout in the area was 84%). This shows that Glasgow area has the most anti - Unionist beliefs and Edinburgh area has the most pro - unionist beliefs.

Although support for independence declined and/or stagnated generally between 2015 and 2018, it started to increase towards the end of 2019. Independence was leading over Union support in most polls for each month of 2020 up to July. On 6 July 2020, Professor Sir John Curtice stated that "support for the Union [in Scotland] has never been weaker". Following the Brexit transition period, and the UK-EU trade deal going into effect, unionism has generally polled higher than nationalism within Scotland.

=== Wales ===
Multiple polls since 2007 show most people in Wales support remaining part of the United Kingdom over Welsh independence. In 2007, almost 70% of people in Wales supported remaining part of the UK whilst 20% were in favour of Welsh independence. In 2013, support for remaining in the UK was between 49% and 74% of the population. The lowest support for unionism in a standard opinion poll in Wales was 49% in April 2021, with the support for Welsh independence being 42%, the latter's highest ever figure in polling.

=== Northern Ireland ===
Prior to the Catholic Relief Act 1793, Irish Catholics could not vote; and they could not sit in the Westminster Parliament until the passing of the Emancipation Act 1829. Until this point, Ireland's constitutional position was determined by a Unionist Protestant minority. As the Irish population was overwhelmingly Catholic, the penal laws effectively disenfranchised Irish people in Ireland and of course the same effect could be seen in Great Britain where such laws against Catholics overwhelmingly fell on the Irish. Towards the end of the 19th century, Irish unionism was, by and large concentrated in some counties of Ulster as a result of Catholic Relief acts and Catholic Emancipation and later expansion of male suffrage which allowed Irish Catholic nationalists to vote for Irish home rule. This led to the partition of Ireland along the lines of nationalism and unionism in 1920, causing 26 out of 32 counties of Ireland to be separated from the Union to form the Irish Free State in 1922. The rest of the counties were incorporated to Northern Ireland, which remained part of the United Kingdom.

In 2012, Northern Irish support for the Union had increased after the end of The Troubles, especially within the Roman Catholic population. In part, this is as a result of a decreasing association of the Union with radical or extremist political ideologies following the Good Friday Agreement. After Brexit, support for a United Ireland was shown to have increased to a majority in one poll concerning reunification within 20 years, however most polling still puts Unionism firmly in the lead.

== Recent political history ==
Under the Second Johnson ministry, efforts were placed on promoting unionism to keep the union together, once described as "Project Love". The strategy involved replacing formerly EU investment funds with a UK Government "shared prosperity fund" awarded to various local authorities in the United Kingdom, and not involving the devolved governments. The UK Government may have hoped that separatist feeling is dispelled over time as long as the benefits of the UK are well enough advertised. Although critics argued the Conservatives' approach to maintaining their Northern England red wall seats involving "confected rows over flags, history and race" which may "not resonate [with] Scots". Others have stated that "unionism has singularly struggled to articulate its vision as to why Scottish voters should be persuaded".

In June 2021, Welsh First Minister Mark Drakeford announced a plan titled "Reforming Our Union" and described the UK as a "voluntary union" of England, Scotland, Wales and Northern Ireland [that] must be based on a partnership of equals", with devolution a "permanent feature". The plan had twenty ideas for the union including reform of the House of Lords into a constitutional body, centralised funding for devolved legislatures, respect for devolved matters, and devolution of justice and police to Wales inline with Scotland and Northern Ireland.

=== Muscular unionism ===
Attempts to promote the Union during Boris Johnson's time as prime minister were described as "Muscular unionism" or "know-your-place unionism". The strategies used to promote the Union were sometimes described as controversial. Examples include policies to bypass the devolved administrations to award funding relating in devolved areas, the Internal Market Bill, to include the UK flag on large infrastructure projects and requests for UK diplomats to stop referring to the UK as a union of four nations. Some media has stated that Johnson "made the calculation that most voters don't care which level of government delivers particular projects as long as things improve". The efforts have been criticised as being counter-productive and even encouraging independence.

Some have described the approach to be an inevitable response to the failure of devolution as intended by the First Blair ministry to tackle the rise in separatism, or to support the notion of a British nation, and that the "centrifugal forces unleashed by devolution must be balanced by a centripetal role [...] [of] the British State".

Former prime minister Gordon Brown stated that Johnson should stop his policy of "muscular unionism" as it would further the case for Scottish independence. Ciaran Martin, involved in creating the framework for the 2014 Scottish referendum for the UK Government, stated that muscular unionism "is pushing forward a single, British nationalist vision of the future, working to shape government policy to realise it, and relying on an English electoral majority to deliver it. And if you don't like it, know your place". Mark Drakeford, Welsh FM, clarified his government's support for the union but stated that "muscular unionism" was "bad for the UK", and that "raids on the powers of the Senedd is not the way to persuade people that the UK is a deal [that] they want".

== Political parties and other groups ==
The following is a list of active political parties and organisations that support the Union.

Major, Great Britain-wide parties

- Conservative and Unionist Party
  - Scottish Conservatives
  - Welsh Conservatives
  - Northern Ireland Conservatives
- Labour Party (Note: Labour in Northern Ireland endorse the Social Democratic and Labour Party who are in favour of Irish unification)
  - Co-operative Party
  - Scottish Labour
  - Welsh Labour
- Liberal Democrats
  - English Liberal Democrats
  - Scottish Liberal Democrats
  - Welsh Liberal Democrats
- Reform UK

Northern Ireland parties

- Democratic Unionist Party (DUP)
- Progressive Unionist Party (PUP)
- Traditional Unionist Voice (TUV)
- Ulster Unionist Party (UUP)
- Northern Ireland Conservatives (section of the United Kingdom's Conservative party)

Minor parties

- Abolish the Scottish Parliament Party
- Abolish the Welsh Assembly Party
- Britain First
- British National Party (BNP)
- British Unionist Party
- Christian Party
- National Front (NF)
- Scottish Unionist Party (SUP)
- UK Independence Party (UKIP)

Militant and other groups

- Ulster Defence Association (UDA)
- Ulster Volunteer Force (UVF)
- Orange Order

== See also ==
- Britishness
