= Yes for Wales =

Pro-devolution groups in Wales

Yes for Wales! (Welsh: Ie dros Gymru) is the name used to refer to two separate cross-party pro-devolution groups that were formed in the lead up to the 1997 and the 2011 devolution referendums held in Wales.

== 1997 campaign ==
1997 Yes for Wales logo

Yes for Wales was also name of the cross-party pro-devolution group launched on 10 February 1997 to co-ordinate the campaign for a 'Yes' vote in the 1997 Welsh devolution referendum to create a National Assembly for Wales. It was supported by the Welsh Labour Party, Welsh Liberal Democrats and Plaid Cymru. During the 1997 campaign, the Welsh Conservatives were opposed to the call for devolution.

The Yes for Wales organisation placed a great emphasis on grassroots involvement in the campaign and established local branches throughout Wales. It also managed to pull together campaigners and politicians with very different political backgrounds.

The pro-devolution campaign was fought against some fierce opposition from both the Conservative Party and elements within the Labour Party. Although the Assembly has gained increasing acceptance in both parties, these tensions still exist.

The Yes for Wales! Campaign was chaired by Kevin Morgan, a Cardiff University Professor. The campaign's national organiser was Daran Hill.

During the campaign for a Welsh Assembly, Princess Diana died in a car accident in Paris, France. The campaign had been temporarily suspended, and it was wondered what effect the death of the Princess of Wales would have on the referendum. Many commentators were concerned that the death of the princess and focus on the Royal Family would distract from the devolution debate and affect voter turnout.

== 2011 campaign ==
The 2011 group was launched on 4 January 2011 and co-ordinated the successful campaign for a 'Yes' vote in the 2011 Welsh devolution referendum to extend the law-making powers of the National Assembly for Wales.

The group was chaired by Roger Lewis, the group chief executive of the Welsh Rugby Union., on the recommendation of the First Minister and Deputy First Minister for Wales - Carwyn Jones and Ieuan Wyn Jones. Lewis was not a member of any political party but having returned to Wales from a series of senior jobs in the music industry brought private sector credibility as well as a reputation for being passionate about Wales.

The campaign was supported by both parties of the One Wales coalition government in the Assembly: Wales Labour Party and Plaid Cymru, as well as the Liberal Democrats and the Wales Green Party. Although the Welsh Conservative Party were officially neutral, all the Conservative AMs in the Assembly supported a Yes vote and the party group was represented on the Yes for Wales Steering Committee. The campaign also had the support of the other Permitted Participants recognised by the Electoral Commission: Cymru Yfory, Wales TUC and Unison.

The Yes campaign was overseen by a steering committee chaired by Leighton Andrews, the Labour AM for the Rhondda and Welsh Education Minister. On a day-to-day basis it was organised by a small team of volunteers led by Campaign Director Daran Hill, former Labour Special Adviser Cathy Owens, and ex-ITV Wales Political Editor Lee Waters.

The campaign set up more than 30 local groups across Wales and, within a two-month period from January - March 2011, succeeded in printing and distributing 1.5 million leaflets.

== See also ==
- Welsh devolution
- Elections in Wales
- Senedd
- Welsh independence
- Parliament for Wales Campaign

== Bibliography ==
- Leighton Andrews, Wales Says Yes: The Inside Story of the Yes for Wales referendum campaign, (Seren. Bridgend) 1999
