= Welsh independence =

Welsh political philosophy

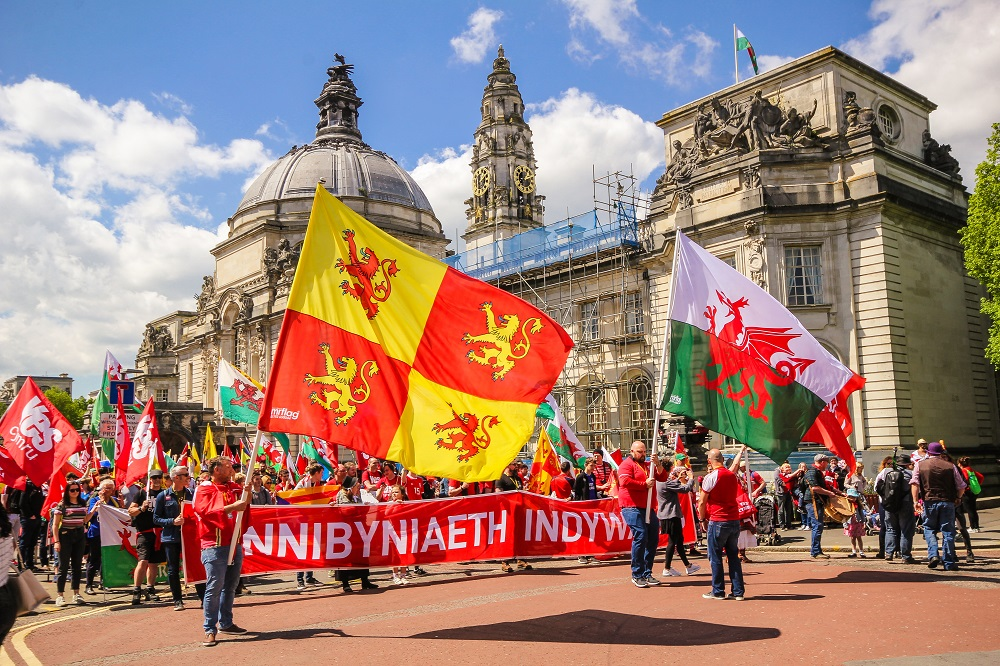
March for Welsh independence held in Cardiff, May 2019. Banner of Owain Glyndŵr (left) is seen flying alongside the modern Welsh flag (right).

Welsh independence (Welsh: Annibyniaeth i Gymru) is a political movement advocating for Wales to become a sovereign state, independent from the United Kingdom.

Wales was conquered during the 13th century by Edward I of England following the killing of Llywelyn the Last, Prince of Wales. Edward introduced the royal ordinance, the Statute of Rhuddlan, in 1284, introducing English common law alongside Welsh law and custom and causing the recently established Welsh principality to be incorporated into the Kingdom of England. Owain Glyndŵr restored Welsh independence c. 1400–15, but Henry IV of England put down the revolt. Henry VIII of England introduced the Laws in Wales Acts between 1535 and 1542, English law replaced Cyfraith Hywel (Welsh medieval law), and the Welsh principality and Marches were integrated into England. and Wales gained representation in parliament and a new equality under the law. The Wales and Berwick Act defined "England" to include Wales in 1746, but the Welsh Language Act 1967, partly repealed this with the term "England and Wales".

The modern Welsh independence movement emerged during the mid-19th century, as did a movement for "home rule". Since 1999, Wales has been granted some legislative power as part of Welsh devolution from the UK parliament, and contemporary Welsh law within the English legal system. At present, the political parties Plaid Cymru, Propel, Gwlad, and the Wales Green Party support Welsh independence, as does the non-partisan YesCymru campaign group.

Opinion polls on Welsh independence show more opposition in Wales to independence than support.

Location of Wales in the United Kingdom

== History ==
=== Norman Conquest of Wales (1067–1282) ===
The only king to unite Wales was Gruffydd ap Llywelyn, who ruled as King of Wales from about 1057 until his death in 1063. Fourteen years later the Norman invasion of Wales began, which briefly controlled much of Wales, but by 1100 Anglo-Norman control was reduced to the lowland Gwent, Glamorgan, Gower, and Pembroke, while the contested border region between the Welsh princes and Anglo-Norman barons became known as the Welsh Marches. The remaining territory was divided between native Welsh principalities. The leading principality was Gwynedd, and, with other Welsh princes becoming their vassals, princes of Gwynedd took the title Prince of Wales. Although English monarchs had made several attempts to seize control of the native Welsh territories, it was not until Edward's war of conquest against Llywelyn, the last native prince of Wales, that this was achieved with the death of Llywelyn in 1282.

=== Revolts ===
Following the death of his brother, Dafydd ap Gruffydd led the initial revolts, until his capture by English forces and became the first person to be hanged, drawn and quartered for high treason. A cadet member of the House of Aberffraw, Madog ap Llywelyn would lead another nationwide revolt in 1294–1295 with another nobleman, Llywelyn Bren revolting in 1316. While fighting with the French in the Hundred Years' War, Owain Lawgoch also made a number of attempts to create an independent Wales with the support of France in the 1370s.

The most significant revolt against English rule was the Glyndŵr Rising of 1400–1415, which briefly restored Welsh independence. Owain Glyndŵr held the first Welsh parliament (Senedd) in Machynlleth in 1404 where he was proclaimed Prince of Wales and a second parliament in 1405 in Harlech. During the same period, the Penal Laws against the Welsh people was implemented, restraining Welsh rights which were reaffirmed during the 15th century and were not removed from the statute books until the 17th century.

=== Annexation ===
During the reign of the King of England Henry VIII, two statutes were passed that are often referred to as the "Acts of Union". The laws incorporated Wales (both the principality and the march) into the King's empire and imposed English law in Wales. Wales was geographically and legally defined, and the laws allowed the Welsh equal status and representation in the English parliament. Nevertheless, the Welsh did not share in legal or political sovereignty and English was insisted as the official language of government, administration and law, which proved to be unpopular.

The Act of Uniformity 1549 made English the language of the reformed church and no provision was made for a Welsh prayer book.

=== Home rule movement (1881–present) ===
==== Independence of church ====
The march for home rule in Wales began with the movement for disestablishing the Anglican church in Wales, and the first step towards this was the Sunday Closing (Wales) Act 1881. This was the first legislation to acknowledge that Wales had a separate politico-legal character from the rest of the English state. Although the majority of people in Wales belonged to nonconformist chapels, the Church of England enjoyed legal and social privileges. This led to a widespread view that things could be done differently in Wales.

David Lloyd George, MP for what was then "Carnarvon Boroughs" (which also included several other North Wales towns), was committed to the cause of disestablishment, but it was not until 1914 that the Welsh Church Act was passed, giving the Church in Wales the freedom to govern its own affairs. The Act came into effect from 1920.

==== Cymru Fydd ====
In response to the Irish demand for "home rule", Liberal prime minister of the UK, William Gladstone proposed two bills on home rule for Ireland in 1886 and 1893, which both failed. In the same year, the Cymru Fydd ("Young Wales") movement was founded to further the cause. The main leaders were David Lloyd George, J. E. Lloyd, O. M. Edwards, T. E. Ellis (leader, MP for Merioneth, 1886–1899) and Beriah Gwynfe Evans. Their goal was a devolved assembly, but the movement was disbanded in 1896 amid personal rivalries.

==== Home Rule All Round ====
After the end of the First World War, there was widespread belief that "home rule all round" was an essential part of reformations and discussions of self-government for small nations were considered an essential part of any peace conference. Home rule for Ireland had been enacted via the Government of Ireland Act 1914 but faced opposition from Ulster unionists and the 1916 Easter Rising proving significant. The UK government considered home rule for Wales and Scotland to avoid making a special case for Ireland. In May 1918, a home rule conference for Wales was held in Llandrindod mostly attended by Liberals and a month later, "home rule all round" was in the Labour manifesto. A stance on federalising the UK was agreed by the South Wales Labour Federation and Arthur Henderson believed that a home ruled Wales could be a "modern utopia". Support was widespread in Wales and some Welsh media felt it was imminent.

Liberal Joseph Chamberlain also proposed "Home Rule All Round" for all nations of the United Kingdom, but after the formation of the Irish Free State in 1922, "home rule all round" lost support.

==== Plaid Cymru ====
In 1925 Plaid Genedlaethol Cymru ("the National Party of Wales") was founded; it was renamed Plaid Cymru – The Party of Wales in 1945. The party's principles as defined in 1970 were (1) self government for Wales, (2) to safeguard the culture, traditions, language and economic position of Wales and (3) to secure membership for a self-governing Welsh state in the United Nations. The party's first Westminster seat (MP) was won by Gwynfor Evans in 1966. By 1974 the party had three MPs and in the 2019 general election it won four seats. Following the formation of the Senedd in 1999, Plaid Cymru won 17 of 60 seats in the initial Welsh election of 1999 and 13 seats in 2021. Following the 2026 election, the party became the largest in the Senedd, enabling it to form a government for the first time in its history.

In 1975, Plaid Cymru opposed remaining in the European Communities (EC). The party stated, at the time, that it felt that the EC's regional aid policies would "reconcile places like Wales to their subordinate position". Nevertheless, 65% of Welsh voters voted to remain in the EC in the 1975 referendum. The EC was incorporated into the European Union (EU) in 1993.

==== A Parliament for Wales ====
In the 1950s, the deterioration of the British Empire removed a sense of Britishness and there was a realisation that Wales was not as prosperous as south-east England and smaller European countries. Successive Conservative Party victories in Westminster led to suggestions that only through self-government could Wales achieve a government reflecting the votes of a Welsh electorate. The Tryweryn flooding which was voted against by almost every single Welsh MP, suggested that Wales as a nation was powerless. The Epynt clearance in 1940 has also been described as a "significant – but often overlooked – chapter in the history of Wales".

On 1 July 1955, a conference of all parties was called at Llandrindod by the New Wales Union (Welsh: Undeb Cymru Fydd) to consider a national petition for a Parliament for Wales. The main leaders were Megan Lloyd George, the daughter of David Lloyd George, T. I. Ellis, and Sir Ifan ab Owen Edwards. According to the historian W. R. P. George, "Megan was responsible for removing much prejudice against the idea of a parliament for Wales". She later presented the petition with 250,000 signatures to the British government in April 1956.

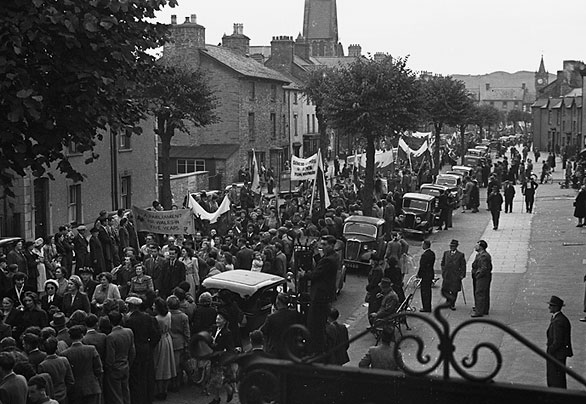
A Plaid Cymru rally in Machynlleth in 1949 where the "Parliament for Wales in 5 years" campaign was started

The declaration of Cardiff as the capital of Wales in 1955, the Labour Party's 1959 commitment to appoint a Secretary of State for Wales, the creation of the Welsh Office in 1965, and the repeal of the Wales and Berwick Act 1746 two years later seemed to demonstrate a growing nationalist impetus. However, the heavy defeat for a proposed Welsh Assembly offered by Labour in the 1979 devolution referendum "suggested that the vast majority of the inhabitants of Wales had no desire to see their country having a national future".

In the early 1990s, Labour became committed to devolution for both Scotland and Wales, and in 1997 it was elected with a mandate to hold referendums on a Scottish Parliament and a Welsh Assembly. The proposed assembly won a narrow majority in the 1997 referendum.

The National Assembly for Wales was formed in 1999, which was renamed Senedd Cymru/Welsh Parliament in 2020. Since the referendum on Welsh devolution in 1997 and formation of the Senedd (then National Assembly for Wales) in 1999, there has been increased support for and trust in the Senedd, with support for it to receive more devolved powers. Further powers have been granted to the Senedd by the Government of Wales Act 2006, the Wales Act 2014, and the Wales Act 2017.

Support for independence has increased from around 14% in 2014 to its highest support of 46% in April 2021 when excluding don't knows. Although in March 2023, a poll showed support for independence had dropped to its lowest level since 2019 to 18%; with the drop potentially being attributed to the prospect of a Labour UK Government. However it increased to another high level in April 2025, with a poll for YesCymru stating 41% supported independence, when excluding don't knows, with 53% of people aged 18 to 24 and 72% of those 25 to 34 supporting it. On the topic of a referendum, a January 2021 YouGov poll found that 47% of people in Wales opposed one within the next five years while 31% supported it.

== Independence movement ==
The independence movement has been present in Wales since the mid-19th century and Plaid Cymru has also campaigned for it throughout the majority of the 20th century, since it was founded in 1925. In the 21st century, the question of Welsh independence became more prominent following increased discussion on a second Scottish independence referendum.

YesCymru logo

=== YesCymru ===
Non-partisan pro-independence group YesCymru was founded in 2014 and open to the public for membership in 2016. In 2020, the group claimed that they had had a sudden rise in membership with 17,000 members by the end of 2020, partly influenced by the British government response to the COVID-19 pandemic.

=== Referendum proposals ===
In 2017, there were plans to hold a second referendum on Scottish independence, Plaid Cymru leader Leanne Wood said there needed to be a national debate on Welsh independence. In July 2020, Plaid brought forward a motion to discuss a referendum on Welsh independence, but it was rejected 43 votes to 9. On 24 October 2020, Wales Green Party members voted at their party conference that the party would support Welsh independence in the event of a referendum being held on whether or not Wales should become independent from the United Kingdom. In July 2020, Plaid Cymru tabled a motion for Welsh ministers to seek permission from Westminster for the right of the Senedd to legislate for a Welsh independence referendum. The members of Senedd rejected this motion 43 votes to 9. This was the first time in history that Welsh independence was debated in the Senedd.

On 11 December 2020, Plaid Cymru leader Adam Price stated that if his party won a majority at the 2021 Senedd election, an independence referendum would be held in its first term in office. At Plaid's special conference on independence, held on 13 February 2021, party members formally approved Price's pledge to hold a referendum in or before 2026. In addition to Plaid, three other parties—the Wales Green Party, Gwlad and Propel—stood on a pro-independence platform at the Senedd election. In the 2021 Senedd Election, of 60 seats, Plaid Cymru won 5 Constituency and 8 regional. Gwlad and Propel both won 0.

In June 2022, the UK government announced its intention to repeal the Welsh Government's Trade Union (Wales) Act 2017, which bans agency staff from being used if public sector workers go on strike. Plaid Cymru's Adam Price called this a "power grab" and "potentially devolution's breaking point", and called for a referendum to be held in order to protect the Senedd's powers. In response, First Minister Mark Drakeford stated that in order for a referendum to be held, a pro-referendum party would have to win the most seats in an election.

=== Labour for an Independent Wales ===
Labour for an Independent Wales, which is a group of Labour Party members who "believe the best way to achieve a democratic socialist Wales is through independence", was formed in 2018. Welsh Labour member Harriet Protheroe-Soltani has suggested that in order for the Welsh independence movement to create a supermajority and a cross-party movement, then the support of Welsh Labour members is required. In August 2020, a YouGov poll showed that 39% of Welsh Labour voters would vote for independence "if there was a referendum tomorrow". The Welsh Governance Centre also showed that in the last Senedd election over 40% of Labour voters supported independence.

=== All Under One Banner Cymru and independence marches ===
On 11 May 2019, the first march in history for Welsh independence was organised by All Under One Banner Cymru (AUOB Cymru) in Cardiff, with an estimated 3,000 in attendance. On 27 July 2019, AUOB organised an independence march in Caernarfon. An estimate put the attendance at about 8,000. On 7 September 2019, a third AUOB Cymru was held in Merthyr Tydfil and attracted a crowd of 5,200.

A pro-independence march organised by AUOBCymru, Indy Fest Wrexham and YesCymru took place in Wrexham on 2 July 2022, the first such march since before the pandemic. According to organisers, 6,000–8,000 were in attendance. A further march was held in Cardiff on 1 October 2022, with around 8,000 campaigners taking part.

The first march of 2023 was held in Swansea on 20 May. Between 6,000 and 7,000 supporters attended.

The only march of 2024 took place in Carmarthen on 22 June 2024. Speakers included former Labour MPs Gwynoro Jones and Beth Winter.

The first independence march of 2025 was in Barry on Saturday, April 26. The second march of 2025 was in Rhyl on Saturday, October 18.

The 2026 independence march is scheduled for Saturday, September 26, in Aberystwyth.

=== Influence of Brexit and Scottish independence ===
In January 2021, Guto Harri, who was Boris Johnson's communications chief when the latter was Mayor of London, wrote in The Sunday Times that "the idea of independence is taking off, with new recruits from very different backgrounds." He went on to say, "Brexiteers will hate me for saying this, but it is clear that some have contributed more to the cause of Welsh independence than my late father. The prospect of being attached to a leftover English rump of the UK, if Scotland and Northern Ireland head off, seems bleak to many people. And having argued against pooling sovereignty with our neighbours to facilitate trade and maximise our influence, Brexiteers should not be surprised if the same logic is applied in a different setting." Likewise, according to Martin Johnes, Professor of Modern History at Swansea University: "For so many [Welsh] voters, Brexit was not just a rejection of the EU but also of the British political establishment and its ways of doing things — ways that have failed far too many working-class communities for far too long. [...] For those who haven't given up on politicians entirely, independence can feel the only hope they have left. Some feel they have little to lose."

Richard Wyn Jones, director of the Welsh governance centre at Cardiff University, claimed that the cause of independence in Wales would be boosted significantly if Scotland chose independence first. Adam Price made the argument that if the UK Supreme Court allowed a referendum on Scottish independence to be held without Westminster's position, then Wales should be allowed to do the same. The judgement of the Supreme Court in November 2022 was that "If the UK Government and Parliament were unwilling to modify those reserved powers (as they did before the 2014 independence referendum) then 'the Scottish Parliament does not have the power to legislate for a referendum on Scottish independence'".

Following and in connection with Brexit, the term "Wexit" had been used to describe Welsh independence.

=== Independent Constitution Commission ===
In September 2021, an open letter, signed by a number of groups who advocate for Welsh independence (including AUOBCymru, members of the former central committee of YesCymru as well as Welsh Football Fans for Independence), was sent to First Minister Mark Drakeford. Written in response to Drakeford's proposed constitutional commission, it stated that "Wales needs an independence commission, not one to salvage the union."

The following month, the Independent Constitutional Commission was launched by the Welsh Labour government. Led by Professor Laura McAllister and former Archbishop of Wales, Rowan Williams, it will examine Wales' future relationship with the rest of the UK and will consider Welsh independence as well. Plaid Cymru called the commission the "most wide-ranging national conversation about Wales' future". The interim findings of the commission outlined three viable options for Wales including independence, to be explored in more depth in 2023. The report outlined the option of a Free Trade Association during a transition period to independence where an agreement could be made for e.g. England responsibility for matters such as defence. The report also identified a confederation of Britain and Ireland as a potential option and key questions on independence to be addressed in 2023. The report concluded that there are "significant problems" with the way Wales is currently governed within the Union of the United Kingdom and independence is a "viable" option.

=== Future Cymru Forum ===
In the Plaid Cymru conference of 2022, leader Adam Price announced "The Future Cymru Forum" with the Wales Green Party to "consult, research and develop a ground-breaking body of work" on an independent Wales.

On 23 December 2022, think tank Melin Drafod announced the first ever Welsh independence summit, which was held in the Brangwyn Hall in Swansea on 28 January 2023. Speakers at the summit included Adam Price, Wales Green Party leader Anthony Slaughter and Councillor Rachel Garrick of Welsh Labour for Independence. Welsh independence campaign groups Undod and YesCymru as well as Welsh-language pressure group, Cymdeithas yr Iaith all made speeches as well.

Melin Drafod's Harriet Protheroe-Soltani said, "This is the first summit of its kind where we're trying to bring people from all across the movement into one room to kind of thrash out some of those difficult discussions, to learn from one another. It is also to see the diversity of the movement in terms of different people in different parties having different tactics — but we're all on the same broader journey towards independence."

== Issues ==
The independent constitution commission identified "key questions" on the "viable" option of independence in its interim report. It aims to test potential solutions in the next phase, set to be published by the end of 2023. The key questions included addressing the following;

- Sustaining at least the current level of public services on the basis of its own fiscal capacity.
- Financing matters currently controlled by UK government including pensions and benefits, and forming the capacity immigration, trade and overseas representation.
- Establish fiscal stability and credibility, selection of currency.
- Maintain confidence of the financial markets immediately after independence and in the long term.
- Operation of the Wales/England border and any implications for everyday businesses and citizens crossing.
- Implications of a national trade border with the rest of the UK, Europe and the world.
- Would an independent Wales join the EU and how long would this take.

=== Arguments for independence ===
==== Westminster criticisms ====
As of the 2019 general election, 40 of 650 seats at the House of Commons are in Wales. Wales has the smallest average constituency size, with 56,000 constituents per MP compared to 72,200 per MP for England. Proposals revealed by the Boundary Commission in 2020 would reduce the number of Welsh seats from 40 down to 32 as part of efforts to equalise constituency sizes. Advocates for Welsh independence often cite the small number of seats in Wales as a justification for independence. They feel that this limits the ability of Wales to help make political decisions within the UK. Dissatisfaction with the House of Lords, where members are appointed rather than elected, has also been cited as a reason for independence. Further criticisms made of the Westminster system includes:

- Westminster government is not necessarily the government Wales voted for
- The Westminster first-past-the-post voting system ensures that a party can win a majority with only three in ten of voters
- Lack of Westminster concern for Welsh matters and lack of investment in Wales
- Welsh devolution powers are limited, with many matters reserved by Westminster
- Westminster retains parliamentary sovereignty and devolved powers can be taken away

==== Powers ====
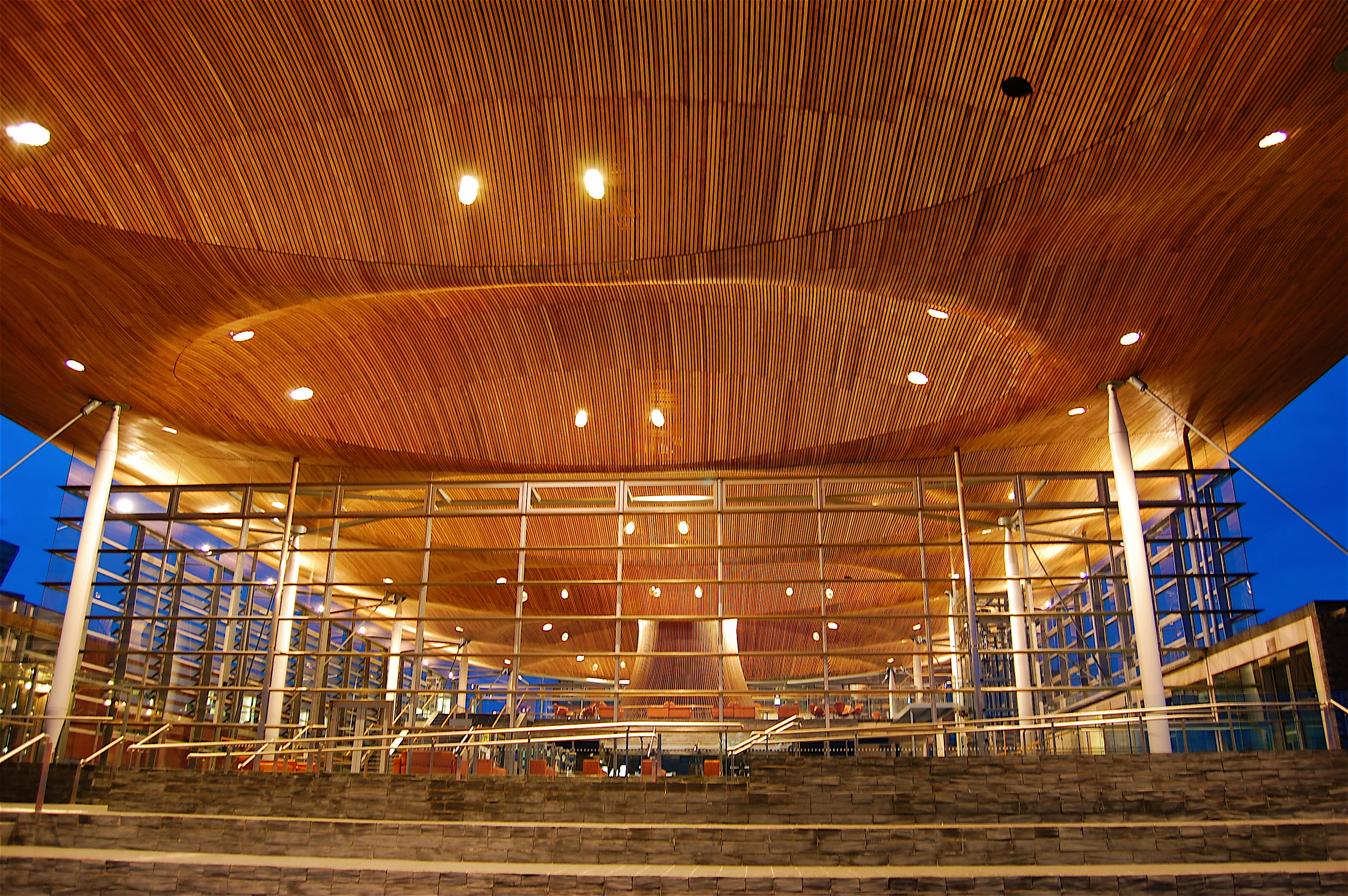
The Senedd building, housing the Senedd (Senedd Cymru / Welsh Parliament)

A central argument made by those in favour of independence is that becoming an independent country would allow Wales to make its own decisions on policy areas such as foreign policy, taxation, and other non-devolved issues. It has also been suggested that the Welsh government would be able to be fully accountable for an independent Wales and that the Welsh electorate would have sole political representation and would elect a government voted for by Wales only. Further proposed powers include:

- Ability to develop infrastructure such as transport and broadband
- Ability to build large energy projects to generate electricity that could be sold
- Creation of a custom, bespoke Welsh constitution including human rights and rights within the judicial system
- Control over the Crown Estate to provide Welsh revenue and potential for even more green energy generation
- Making Wales safer by separation from UK foreign affairs
- Option for inclusion in the UK and Ireland Common Travel Area.
- A custom immigration system

==== Economy and trade ====
Video of Welsh Government COVID-19 press conference where Economy Minister Ken Skates announces that the UK HMRC refused to share data with the Welsh Government

Welsh independence would also grant Wales far greater control over its economy. Proponents of independence argue that this would allow Wales to flourish as an independent country.

Advocates for independence suggest that Wales could draw from the success of the Republic of Ireland following its independence from the UK. In 1922, Ireland was financially heavily dependent on Britain. Ireland is said to have benefitted from EU membership in 1973 and by International Monetary Fund and had an economic growth called the Celtic Tiger from the 1990s. It has also been noted that Wales is in a better economic state than 1920s Ireland, when it gained independence. Think tank Melin Drafod suggests that an independent Wales would have newly found abilities to raise an additional £3 billion a year in public services funding via different tax and other policies. Further economic arguments made for independence include:

- Economic flexibility, more open to trade and adapt better to economic shock as a relatively small country as seen in the Flotilla effect.
- Full control over economic ability
- Powers for borrowing money
- Ability to form a development bank
- Ability to develop a competitive tax rate to draw industries
- A system of bank regulation, designed to protect citizens and not just the banks
- Addressing the fiscal deficit in Wales and reshaping the Welsh economy
- Welsh internal exports within the UK not published. These could be substantial
- Currency options: Pound, Welsh pound or euro all with pros and cons

==== Culture and sport ====
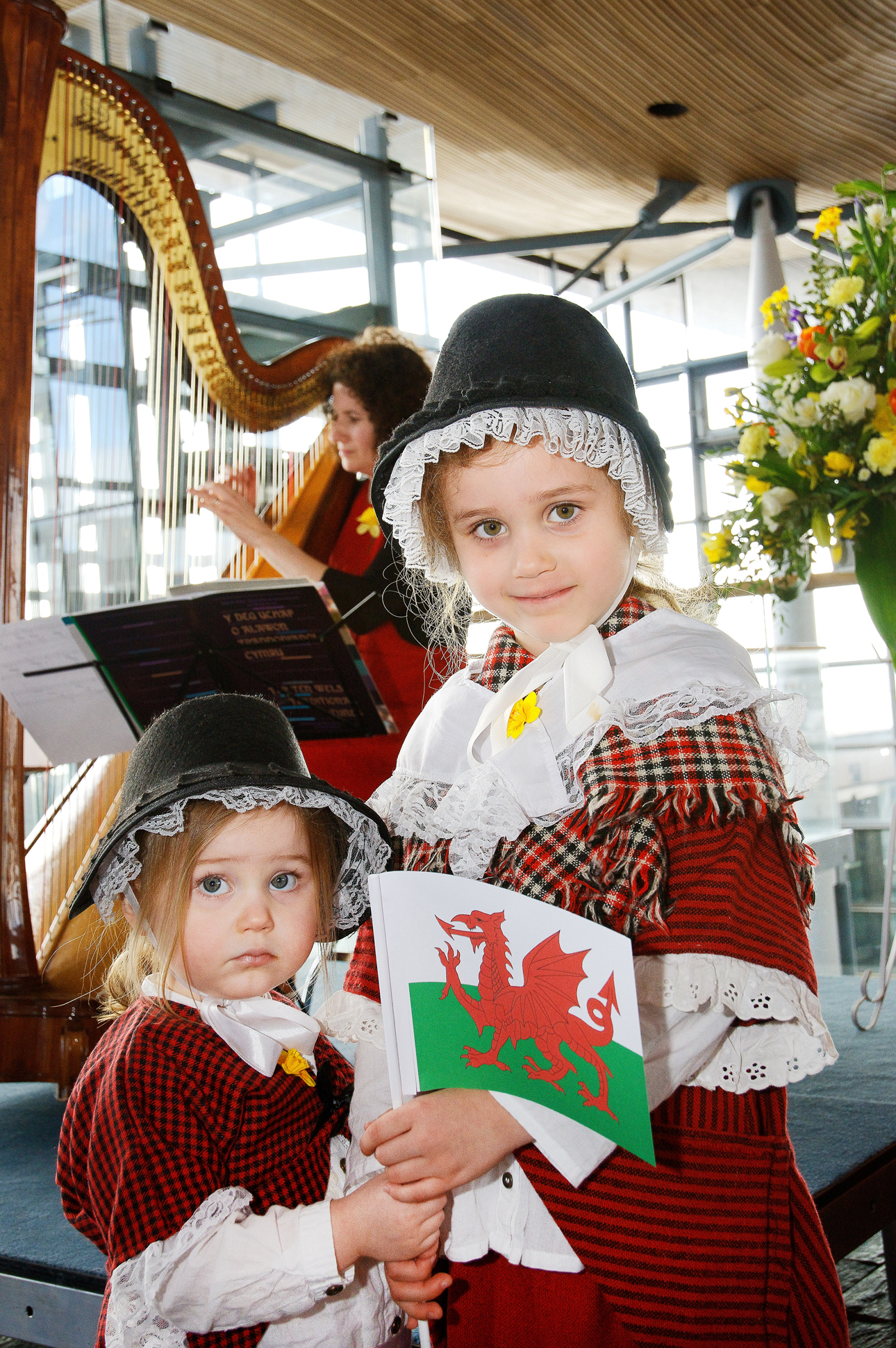
St David's Day, 2014

- Bank holiday powers, including a proposed St David's Day bank holiday
- Better protection of Welsh culture
- Supporters of Welsh independence have argued that the ability to form Welsh teams in sports such as cricket or at the Olympics would represent a significant benefit.
- Better protection of the Welsh language

==== European Union membership ====
The United Kingdom left the EU in 2020 following a referendum on membership in 2016. At the referendum, 53% of Welsh voters voted to leave, though Plaid Cymru, the only pro-independence party with representatives in the Welsh Assembly, opposed leaving. While most people who are pro-independence also favour joining the EU, this is not a universal position. According to Ashcroft Polls, a "significant" number of Plaid voters also voted for Brexit.

Since Brexit, many pro-independence campaigners, including Plaid, have argued that joining the EU would be a benefit to leaving the UK, noting the success of small nations such as Lithuania, Slovakia and the Republic of Ireland within the EU. It has been suggested that an independent Wales would have the option to join the EU in an exclusive Welsh deal if this option benefits Wales. A January 2021 poll found that a majority of Welsh voters were in favour of rejoining the EU, (44% for and 38% against).

An alternative option to EU membership is membership of the European Free Trade Association with a view to joining the European single market. Plaid Cymru has said that it will " explore the prospects for an independent Wales becoming a member of the European Free Trade Association, with a view to becoming part of the European Economic Area." With EFTA membership, an independent Wales would also be in a position to negotiate a free trade deal with England. Adam Price has stated that Plaid Cymru would seek to join the EFTA if Wales became independent. The Welsh Labour Government's current position is to remain outside both the EU and single market. In June 2022, Adam Price of Plaid Cymru called on the Welsh Labour Government to support rejoining the single market (without rejoining the EU) as was previously supported by both parties in the "Securing Wales's Future" white paper.

=== Arguments against independence ===
Reasons for continuing the union can be summarised as follows:

- Fiscal deficit – At £4,300, Wales' fiscal deficit per capita is the second highest of the UK's economic regions, after the Northern Ireland fiscal deficit. Tax revenue per capita in Wales is 76% of the UK average, but spending is 108 percent, leading to a shortfall. This shortfall is currently made up in part by the net fiscal surplus of some English regions of the UK, and the absence of this in the event of Welsh independence would necessitate some combination of increased revenue, reduced expenditure or increased borrowing.
- Currency – In the event of independence for either Scotland or Wales, the issue over currency is brought up. A currency union between an independent Scotland and the remaining UK was ruled out in the lead-up to the 2014 referendum. Scotland can continue to use the pound sterling without a currency union, but it will lack control over its monetary policy, such as interest rates. Those would be the responsibility of the Bank of England, the UK's central bank, who may prioritise the UK's economy over Scotland in the absence of a currency sharing agreement.
- "A stronger voice" and money from other parts of the UK – former First Minister of Wales and Leader of Welsh Labour from 2009 to 2018, Carwyn Jones, argued in 2012 that Wales being part of the UK "gives us a much stronger voice on the world stage". He also argued that "money is transferred from richer parts of the UK into Wales".

== Support for independence ==
=== Political parties with parliamentary representation in Wales ===
- Plaid Cymru
- Wales Green Party

=== Other parties ===
- Propel
- Gwlad
- Plaid Gomiwnyddol Cymru
- Welsh Underground Network
- Socialist Workers' Party

=== Individuals ===
- Eddie Butler (1957–2022) – Welsh rugby international and rugby commentator
- Charlotte Church – Welsh singer songwriter and political campaigner.
- Dafydd Iwan – Welsh folk singer, political campaigner and former politician.
- Bryn Fôn – Welsh singer, actor and producer
- Neville Southall – Welsh football international and social justice activist
- Iolo Williams – Welsh nature observer, author and television presenter.
- Julian Lewis Jones – Welsh actor best known for House of the Dragon.
- R. S. Thomas (1913–2000) – Welsh poet
- Angharad Mair – Welsh television presenter and executive director of Tinopolis
- Polly James – Welsh broadcaster who supports independence if it helps to reduce child poverty.
- Kizzy Crawford – Welsh singer-songwriter.
- Myrddin ap Dafydd – Welsh writer, poet and publisher.
- Callum Scott Howells – Welsh actor
- The Barry Horns – Welsh football brass band.
- Ashton Hewitt – professional Welsh rugby player
- Mike Jenkins – Welsh poet
- Patrick Jones – Welsh poet
- Glyndwr Jones – Welsh CEO, author and education professional who argues for a confederation.
- Andy John – Former Archbishop of Wales.
- Russell T Davies – Welsh screenwriter and producer

==== Politicians ====
- Adam Price – former leader of Plaid Cymru
- Leanne Wood – former leader of Plaid Cymru
- Gwynfor Evans (1912–2005) – former leader of Plaid Cymru
- Rhun ap Iorwerth – leader of Plaid Cymru (from 16 June 2023) and former BBC journalist
- Dafydd Wigley – Lord and former leader of Plaid Cymru
- Ieuan Wyn Jones – former leader of Plaid Cymru
- Lewis Valentine (1893–1986) – first leader of Plaid Cymru
- Dafydd Elis-Thomas – first Llywydd, former leader of Plaid Cymru and independent MS
- Gwynoro Jones – former Labour MP
- Elystan Morgan (1932–2021) – former Labour MP and Lord that supported "dominion" status
- Zack Polanski – leader of the Green Party of England and Wales

== Opposition to independence ==
=== Parties with parliamentary representation in Wales ===
- Reform UK
- Welsh Labour
- Welsh Conservatives
- Welsh Liberal Democrats
- Co-operative Party

=== Other parties ===
- Liberal Party
- UK Independence Party
- British National Party
- Abolish the Welsh Assembly Party
- Social Democratic Party
- Socialist Party Wales
- Christian Party

== Alternatives ==
- Further devolution of powers – More powers devolved from the Parliament of the United Kingdom to Wales and its devolved government. Devolution of powers to either local councils or a regional collection of them, such as North Wales has also been advocated.
- Decentralising power and wealth across the UK, including to and within Wales – This argument not only supports greater decentralisation to Wales, but also more power decentralised within Wales and the rest of the UK to local authorities and regions. For example, it has been argued that too much power is centralised in Cardiff, which could be handed out to the regions of Wales.
- Devolution system reform – An April 2022 article in The Economist argued that "a better combination of devolution and centralisation would compel governments to work together". The author argues that the existing devolution settlement "is making the United Kingdom chronically miserable", as politics in Scotland and Northern Ireland are "dominated by unresolved arguments about the constitution", neglecting local issues, such as healthcare and schooling. The editor suggests that powers were "crudely handed out" to devolved bodies and the resulting politics "favour blaming the centre [Westminster] rather than working with it". Leading to clashes over issues such as new nuclear power stations or gas drilling as energy policy is reserved to Westminster but planning is devolved. An "exchange" of powers to allow for better co-ordination, such as increasing devolved say over immigration and EU relations in return for increased UK-devolved cooperation in major transport links and energy security, as well as direct Westminster involvement in devolution failings over health and education, was advocated.
- Federal system – Federalism in the United Kingdom has been touted as an alternative political system to prevent a possible breakup.

== Public opinion ==
Opinion polling on Welsh independence has been carried out by various organisations to gauge public attitudes to independence. The dates for these opinion polls are from January 2007. Polling was initially sporadic, but it has been carried out almost every month from January 2021 to 2023. The question typically asked by pollsters is "Should Wales be an independent country?".

== See also ==
=== Wales ===
- Independent Nation: Should Wales Leave the UK?
- Culture of Wales
- History of Wales
- Welsh nationalism
- Parliament for Wales Campaign
- Yes for Wales
- Welsh Wars of Independence
- Glyndŵr Rising

=== Related movements ===
- Scottish independence
- Yes Scotland
- United Ireland
- Ireland's Future
- English independence
- Potential breakup of the United Kingdom
- List of active separatist movements in Europe

== Sources ==
- Davies, John (1994). A History of Wales. Penguin. ISBN 0-14-014581-8.
