= Undeb Cymru Fydd =

Welsh cultural society

Undeb Cymru Fydd (known in English as the New Wales Union) was a Welsh patriotic and cultural society. It was founded in 1941 when Undeb Cenedlaethol y Cymdeithasau Cymreig (National Union of Welsh Societies) and Pwyllgor Amddiffyn Diwylliant Cymru (Committee for the Protection of Welsh Culture) merged to form a new organization with the aim of promoting Welsh culture and the Welsh language and to be the focus and medium of cooperation for that purpose. The new organization took the name of the earlier patriotic movement Cymru Fydd, which was established in 1886.

== Cultural activity ==
Undeb Cymru Fydd's main activity was to press the UK government to adopt policies specific for Wales and to promote the Welsh language in areas such as education and broadcasting. In addition, a series of books and magazines such as Atgofion Cymru (Welsh Memories) for Welsh-speaking members of the armed forces during World War II.

Cymdeithas Lyfrau (Book Society) was formed in 1943; which published a journal for teachers Yr Athro (The Teacher), 1951-ca1970, as well as popular calendars. After Undeb Cymru Fydd suspended activity in 1970, Yr Athro was published by Welsh teachers' union UCAC.

A joint Committee between Undeb Cymru Fydd and the Churches was appointed to address the displacement of factory workers by the civilian wartime service during World War II.

== Political activity ==
One of the movement's first campaigns was the unsuccessful struggle to protect Mynydd Epynt, a Welsh-speaking farming community as well as other areas of Wales from being occupied by the War Office during World War II.

In 1950 a special conference was held which resulted in the Parliament for Wales Campaign culminating in a petition containing 250,000 names being presented to the UK Government. Undeb Cymru Fydd was overtaken by events in the 1960s with the rise of political Welsh nationalism and the establishment of Cymdeithas yr Iaith Gymraeg (Welsh Language Society) in 1962.

Throughout its existence, Undeb Cymru Fydd campaigned for Welsh-medium schools, the establishment of an Education Committee, and for better and more Welsh language provision in the media.

== Organisation ==
Undeb Cymru Fydd was managed by a Council and an executive committee, and committees addressing specific topics (education, radio, books, and Welsh Churches). At a local level, there were 13 branches inherited from Pwyllgor Amddiffyn Diwylliant Cymru. It held an Annual Conference, usually in June or July. After 1967, there were expert panels covering topics related to women, education, and television.

In 1956, a Women's Committee was established, which published its own newsletter, Llythyr Ceridwen (Ceridwen's Letter) between 1956 and ca. 1967.

In September 1965, Undeb Cymru Fydd was reorganised and registered as an educational charity, promoting Welsh-medium education for adults, and from then on the Ymddeirdolaeth Cymru Fydd (Cymru Fydd Trust) received applications for financial assistance.

All activities ceased in March 1970. and the charity was dissolved in 2000.

TI Ellis (1899 - 1970), son of the politician Thomas Edward Ellis (1859 - 1899) who played an important role in the 19th-century incarnation of Cymru Fydd, was secretary of the movement until 1967. Tom Jones worked as a full-time organizer, 1944–1949, as did Gwilym Tudur, 1966 - 1968.

The records of Undeb Cymru Fydd were donated to the National Library of Wales in 1997.
