= Powers and status of Welsh devolution =

Responsibilities and status of the Senedd

Since the establishment of Welsh devolution in 1999, the powers devolved to the Senedd from the UK Parliament have developed and expanded. As a result of the increase in responsibility the then National Assembly for Wales renamed itself the Welsh Parliament, or Senedd Cymru in Welsh, in 2020.

Some powers that are reserved to the UK Parliament have also been called to be devolved to Wales, or for system reform to achieve Welsh independence or an alternative constitutional reform. On the other hand, there remains some opposition to devolution, questioning its legitimacy, and calling for its abolition.

The Senedd has powers over any policy not reserved to the UK Parliament, therefore can make legislation for areas such as; agriculture and rural affairs, historic buildings, culture and Welsh language, education, economic development, the environment, fire and rescue, health and health services, food, highways and transport, housing, social welfare, local government, sport, tourism, and others. While it cannot legislate on reserved matters such as benefits, defence, foreign affairs, immigration, and nuclear energy.

== Powers of the Senedd ==
=== Overview ===
The Senedd has been given law-making powers from the UK Parliament, so it can pass primary legislation, as Acts of Senedd Cymru, that are equivalent in status to Acts of Parliament. However, the Senedd is not sovereign, it cannot legislate on any matter it chooses, but is governed by the powers set out first in the Government of Wales Act 1998, later replaced by the Government of Wales Act 2006, which has been amended by the Wales Act 2014 and Wales Act 2017.

The Senedd now operates on a "reserved powers model" set out in the Wales Act 2017, replacing the "conferred powers model", with the Senedd allowed to make laws on any matter that is not reserved to the UK Parliament. Laws by the Senedd must not be related to the reserved matters set out in the Schedule 7A of the act and not breach any restrictions set out in Schedule 7B of the same act.

Initially the then assembly had more limited powers than now, but eventually gained full law-making powers of areas such as; agriculture and rural affairs, culture and Welsh language, education, the environment, health and healthcare services, local government, transport (excluding rail infrastructure), and any other policy not reserved to the UK Parliament. (see the lists in the laws below)

The assembly also gained powers to amend certain taxes. While powers such as benefits, defence, foreign affairs, immigration, nuclear energy and major rail infrastructure remain reserved (see Powers and status of Welsh devolution § Schedule 7A - Reserved Matters) to the UK Parliament. This increase in powers over time awarded to the then assembly, led to it renaming itself the Welsh Parliament, or Senedd Cymru, simply the "Senedd" in both languages.

=== Specific laws ===
==== Government of Wales Act 1998 ====
The Government of Wales Act 1998 allowed the creation of the then known National Assembly for Wales (now the Senedd) and also describes devolved powers given to the devolved legislature. These powers include most of the powers previously held by the Secretary of State for Wales

Under the 1998 act, the Welsh Assembly received powers to legislate on powers previously held by the Secretary of State for Wales, the powers included:

- Agriculture
- Forestry
- Fisheries and food
- Ancient monuments and historic buildings
- Culture (including museums, galleries and libraries)
- Economic development
- Education and training
- The environment
- Health and health services
- Highways
- Housing
- Industry
- Local government
- Social services
- Sport and recreation
- Tourism
- Town and country planning
- Transport
- Water and flood defence
- The Welsh language

It also awarded the powers over multiple national institutions such as:

- Arts Council of Wales
- Education and Learning Wales
- Historic Buildings Council for Wales
- Library Advisory Council for Wales
- Qualifications, Curriculum and Assessment Authority for Wales
- Wales Tourist Board
- Welsh Industrial Development Advisory Board
- Welsh Development Agency
- Welsh Language Board
- Environment Agency Wales
- Countryside Council for Wales
- Higher Education Funding Council for Wales
- Ancient Monuments Board for Wales
- Welsh National Board for Nursing
- Midwifery and Health Visiting
- National Library of Wales
- National Museum of Wales
- Royal Commission on the Ancient and Historical Monuments of Wales
- Sports Council for Wales and Forestry Commission Wales
- Auditor General for Wales

==== Government of Wales Act 2006 ====
The Government of Wales Act 2006 separated the Welsh Government and the National Assembly for Wales and gives the assembly the power to create legislation on devolved matters in the following "fields":

1. Agriculture, fisheries, forestry & rural development
2. Ancient monuments & historic buildings
3. Culture
4. Economic development
5. Education & training
6. Environment
7. Fire and rescue services & promotion of fire safety
8. Food
9. Health & health services
10. Highways and transport
11. Housing
12. Local government
13. National Assembly for Wales
14. Public administration
15. Social welfare
16. Sport and recreation
17. Tourism
18. Town and country planning
19. Water and flood defence
20. Welsh language

==== Wales Act 2014: Tax ====
The Wales Act 2014 awarded the then Assembly the following powers:

1. Legislate devolved taxes. These revisions to devolution are added to Part 4A of the Government of Wales Act 2006.
2. This Act also allows the Senedd to set income tax rates for Wales.
3. Welsh Ministers’ borrowing powers. This includes powers to borrow funds and meet current expenditure (Welsh income tax vs forecast receipts).
4. The power for borrowing in order to fund capital spending (with the consent of UK Treasury). This sum was increased from £500 million to £1 billion.

Other provisions include:

- Increasing the Assembly term from 4 to 5 years
- no restriction on standing as an Assembly constituency member and Assembly regional member
- Prevents someone from being both an MP and AM
- Welsh Assembly Government renamed Welsh Government
- Local Government and Housing Act 1989: limits on housing debts incurred by local housing authorities in Wales with a Housing Revenue Account
- Law Commission to provide advice and assistance to Welsh Ministers & Welsh ministers to report how Law Commission recommendations are implemented in Wales

==== Wales Act 2017: Reserved Powers Model ====
The reserved powers model sets out the UK reserved powers that the Senedd are not permitted to apply an Act of Senedd Cymru to change. These are set out in the Wales Act 2017. Matters not listed are permitted to be changed in an Act of Senedd Cymru by the Senedd.

===== Schedule 7A - Reserved Matters =====
The following subject headings are listed in Schedule 7A which contains all of the matters that are reserved to the UK Parliament.

====== Part 1 – General Reservations ======
- The Constitution
- Public service
- Political parties
- Single legal jurisdiction of England and Wales
- Tribunals
- Foreign affairs etc.
- Defence

====== Part 2 – Specific Reservations ======
Head A – Financial and Economic Matters
- Section A1 – Fiscal, economic and monetary policy
- Section A2 – The currency
- Section A3 – Financial services
- Section A4 – Financial markets
- Section A5 – Dormant accounts
Head B – Home Affairs
- Section B1 – Elections
- Section B2 – Nationality and immigration
- Section B3 – National security and official secrets
- Section B4 – Interception of communications, communications data and surveillance
- Section B5 – Crime, public order and policing
- Section B6 – Anti-social behaviour
- Section B7 – Modern slavery
- Section B8 – Prostitution
- Section B9 – Emergency powers
- Section B10 – Extradition
- Section B11 – Rehabilitation of offenders
- Section B12 – Criminal records
- Section B13 – Dangerous items
- Section B14 – Misuse of and dealing in drugs or psychoactive substances
- Section B15 – Private security
- Section B16 – Entertainment and late night refreshment
- Section B17 – Alcohol
- Section B18 – Betting, gaming and lotteries
- Section B19 – Hunting
- Section B20 – Scientific and educational procedures on live animals
- Section B21 – Lieutenancies
- Section B22 – Charities and fund-raising
Head C – Trade and Industry
- Section C1 – Business associations and business names
- Section C2 – Insolvency and winding up
- Section C3 – Competition
- Section C4 – Intellectual property
- Section C5 – Import and export control
- Section C6 – Consumer protection
- Section C7 – Product standards, safety and liability
- Section C8 – Weights and measures
- Section C9 – Telecommunications and wireless telegraphy
- Section C10 – Post
- Section C11 – Research Councils
- Section C12 – Industrial development
- Section C13 – Protection of trading and economic interests
- Section C14 – Assistance in connection with exports of goods and services
- Section C15 – Water and sewerage
- Section C16 – Pubs Code Adjudicator and the Pubs Code
- Section C17 – Sunday trading
Head D – Energy
- Section D1 – Electricity
- Section D2 – Oil and gas
- Section D3 – Coal
- Section D4 – Nuclear energy
- Section D5 – Heat and cooling
- Section D6 – Energy conservation
Head E – Transport
- Section E1 – Road transport
- Section E2 – Rail transport
- Section E3 – Marine and waterway transport etc.
- Section E4 – Air transport
- Section E5 – Transport security
- Section E6 – Other matters
Head F – Social Security, Child Support, pensions and Compensation
- Section F1 – Social security schemes
- Section F2 – Child Support
- Section F3 – Occupational and Personal Pensions
- Section F4 – Public sector compensation
- Section F5 – Armed forces compensation etc.
Head G – Professions
- Section G1 – Architects, auditors, health professionals and veterinary surgeons
Head H – Employment
- Section H1 – Employment and industrial relations
- Section H2 – Industrial training boards
- Section H3 – Job search and support
Head J – Health, Safety and Medicines
- Section J1 – Abortion
- Section J2 – Xenotransplantation
- Section J3 – Embryology, surrogacy and genetics
- Section J4 – Medicines, medical supplies, biological substances etc.
- Section J5 – Welfare foods
- Section J6 – Health and safety
Head K – Media, Culture and Sport
- Section K1 – Media
- Section K2 – Public lending right
- Section K3 – Government Indemnity Scheme
- Section K4 – Property accepted in satisfaction of tax
- Section K5 – Sports grounds
Head L – Justice
- Section L1 – The legal profession, legal services and claims management services
- Section L2 – Legal aid
- Section L3 – Coroners
- Section L4 – Arbitration
- Section L5 – Mental capacity
- Section L6 – Personal data
- Section L7 – Information rights
- Section L8 – Public sector information
- Section L9 – Public records
- Section L10 – Compensation for persons affected by crime and miscarriages of justice
- Section L11 – Prisons and offender management
- Section L12 – Family relationships and children
- Section L13 – Gender recognition
- Section L14 – Registration of births, deaths and places of worship
Head M – Land and Agricultural Assets
- Section M1 – Registration of land
- Section M2 – Registration of agricultural charges and debentures
- Section M3 – Development and buildings
Head N – Miscellaneous
- Section N1 – Equal opportunities
- Section N2 – Control of weapons
- Section N3 – Ordnance Survey
- Section N4 – Time
- Section N5 – Outer space
- Section N6 – Antarctica
- Section N7 – Deep sea bed mining

===== Schedule 7B: Restrictions =====
Schedule 7B sets out certain restrictions on the Senedd's powers. For example, Acts of the Senedd:

- must not generally modify the law on reserved matters;
- must not modify private law (such as contract, tort, property) unless it is for a devolved purpose,
- must not modify certain criminal offences (such as serious offences against the person and any sexual offences) and must not modify certain rules around criminal law (such as the age a person can commit a criminal offence and the meaning of dishonesty);
- must not modify certain enactments such as the Human Rights Act 1998 and the Civil Contingencies Act 2004;
- must not modify any of the 2006 Act unless an exception applies;
- must not confer or impose functions on reserved authorities (such as Ministers of the Crown, the Crown Prosecution Service and the Health & Safety Executive) without the consent of the UK Government.

=== Proposed further powers ===
There have been calls for further Welsh devolution, increasing the autonomy for Wales, since the Welsh legislature of the Senedd was founded following the 1997 Welsh devolution referendum.

==== Crown Estate ====
In 2013, Dr Richard Cowell of Cardiff University said that devolution of the Crown estate in Wales "might enable a better quality of debate about the kind of off-shore renewable energy development pathway that is appropriate for Wales, and open up discussion on how the royalties from resource exploitation should be best invested."

Plaid Cymru called for the devolution of the Welsh Crown Estate in their manifesto in 2011. Liz Saville Roberts called for the devolution of the Crown Estate in Wales saying that a large majority in the Senedd supports its devolution and having the same powers as Scotland over the Crown Estate.

On 21 June 2021, Roberts presented the "Crown Estate (Devolution to Wales) Bill" to the UK Parliament saying this would “devolve management of the Crown Estate and its assets in Wales to the Welsh Government”. In 2022, Plaid Cymru MS Rhys ab Owen also called for the devolution of powers over the Welsh Crown Estate. The first minister, Mark Drakeford suggested that devolving the Crown Estate in Wales to the Welsh government could enable the government to harness the renewable energy potential in Wales saying, "Geography is on our side. If you're on the west side of the UK, you have the prevailing winds. We are surrounded on three sides by water". Liz Saville Roberts MP, leader of Plaid Cymru in Westminster, suggested that devolving these estates could “bring half a billion pounds worth of offshore wind and tidal stream potential under Welsh control." In January 2022, Wales' Climate Change minister Julie James stated that it is “outrageous” that the Crown Estate was devolved in Scotland and not in Wales.

The "Climate Change, Environment and Infrastructure Committee" of the Senedd published a report on 22 February 2022 recommending the devolution of the Crown Estate and using its income to combat climate change.

By July 2022, more than 11,000 supported the devolution of the Crown Estate in Wales with the petition reading, "This is money that would enable Wales to build and develop our own Welsh renewable energy industry rather than selling off our assets to the highest foreign bidder."

The Welsh Liberal Democrats also support the devolution of the Crown Estate in Wales as decided at their conference. Mark Drakeford confirmed in January 2023 that devolving the Crown Estate was Welsh government policy.

The secretary of state for Wales, Simon Hart said that Wales would not benefit from devolving the crown estate. Boris Johnson said that devolution of the Crown Estate would "fragment the market, complicate existing processes and make it more difficult for Wales and the rest of the UK to move forward to net-zero”. The session of the UK Parliament 2021-22 was prorogued and therefore the bill for its devolution sponsored by Liz Saville Roberts did not continue. In June 2022, Conservative MP Greg Hands said that he doesn't understand why there is support for devolving the Crown Estate to Wales. The Welsh Conservatives are opposed to devolving the crown estate to Wales.

In 2023, a poll by YouGov showed that a majority of 58% of the people of Wales support the devolution of the Crown Estate compared to 19% who are opposed and 23% who don't know.

In January 2025, a UK government minister stated no discussions with the Welsh government had taken place, although by February 2025 they clarified that the Welsh government had asked for devolution. The UK government stated they view devolution not to be in "[Wales's] best interests" and expressed concerns over the impact to the energy sector, while the Welsh government says devolution would allow money raised by the estate to be spent in Wales. Eluned Morgan, First Minister and Welsh Labour leader admitted Labour is split on the issue. By 21 February 2025, a majority of Wales principal area councils supported motions advocating to devolve the Crown Estate in Wales. On 24 February 2025, the UK Government rejected calls for the Crown Estate to be devolved to Wales. By June 2025, every Welsh principal council had supported motions for devolution.

==== Taxation and welfare ====
A 2020 YouGov poll found that 59% of Welsh voters would be in favour of devolution of tax and welfare, known as "devo-max". The question asked was “If there was a referendum tomorrow on the transferring of more powers to the Senedd (Welsh Parliament), including control of tax and welfare, but excluding defence and foreign affairs, how would you vote? Should more powers be transferred to the Senedd (Welsh Parliament)?”.

The Welsh government have also called for a vacant land tax to "incentivise developers to progress stalled developments to help provide high quality, safe and affordable housing." Sioned Williams, Plaid Cymru MS (member of Senedd) has called for devolution of welfare powers to the Senedd in response to cuts to Universal Credit made by the UK government. Williams also suggested that full taxation powers should be devolved to the Senedd because "any reforms to tackle poverty that we undertake in Wales will always be limited" without full taxation powers. A study by the Wales Governance Centre at Cardiff University concluded that devolvement of welfare benefits to Wales could increase the Welsh budget by £200 million per annum. The cross-party equality committee of the Senedd also concluded in 2019 that devolution of said powers may create a more "compassionate" system.

On 8 February 2023, Plaid Cymru called for the Welsh Government to support the devolution of setting all rates and bands for Welsh Income Tax. Plaid leader Adam Price said that lack of tax powers hampers effective policy-making in Wales, particularly in responding to the cost-of-living crisis and public services crises. This proposed devolution would match powers already devolved to the Scottish Parliament via the Scotland Act 2012. A report published earlier in the same week by the Senedd's Finance Committee recommended that the Welsh Government researches the risks and benefits of devolving powers to change income tax band rates and thresholds. On the other hand, first minister Mark Drakeford claims that Universal Credit is "better discharged" at a UK wide level and "part of the glue that holds the United Kingdom together" even after suggesting that the cuts to the welfare system by the UK government were "cruel and deliberate".

==== Justice system ====
The Labour Welsh Government, Plaid Cymru and various authors have called for the criminal justice system to move from an England and Wales system to a devolved Welsh system for Wales.

The Commission on Justice in Wales produced a report in 2019 assessing the justice system in Wales for the first time in over 200 years. The report criticised the UK government's funding of justice in Wales, noting that the cuts to the justice budget by the UK government was "amongst the most severe of all departmental budget cuts". The report notes how the Welsh Government has used its own money to attempt to "mitigate the damaging effects of these policies". 40% of justice funding is contributed in Wales in addition to Welsh taxpayers money paid to Westminster which is redistributed back to Wales. The report determined that "justice should be determined and delivered in Wales". In summary, the report made the following recommendations: Justice responsibilities should be held by a single Welsh MS and department, form a Welsh Criminal Justice Board, Criminal justice data should be Wales specific and more detailed and increased utilisation of prison alternatives, particularly for women.

There been calls for justice be devolved to the Senedd by the Welsh Government, and a report in 2022 proposed:

- A focus on prevention and rehabilitation.
- Reducing the prison population by pursuing alternatives to custody where appropriate. These include programmes to tackle mental health issues and support and treatment for drug and alcohol misuse.
- Using a rights based approach to law and policy making, and further incorporation of internationally agreed rights into domestic law.

In December 2022 first minister Mark Drakeford reiterated his desire for devolution of justice and said about Gordon Brown's Labour manifesto proposals of devolution of probation and youth justice, "in a practical way, we should focus on those aspects first, and if we can secure their devolution to Wales, then we will be able to move on from there into the other aspects that would follow." A UK government spokesperson, David Wolfson said that Wales benefitted from the “reputation” of England’s justice system, which “has undeniably benefitted Wales and – as part of the England and Wales jurisdiction – has made it a popular place to do business internationally”.

In May 2026, the UK government announced plans to devolve control over funding for youth justice initiatives to the Welsh Government which was described by the Wales Office as an "important first step" in the devolution of criminal justice.

==== Broadcasting ====
A cross-party Senedd inquiry via a report by The Culture, Welsh Language and Communications Committee concludes that the Senedd should have increased control over how broadcasting is both regulated and funded. The chair of this committee, MS Bethan Sayed concluded that Wales does not have "the media it needs to function as a successful nation". This report included the following recommendations: Increased broadcasting powers devolved, Ofcom with the Welsh and UK governments should state how media can be improved, an impartial fund formed by the Welsh government for news, establishment of an independent funding commission including a Welsh representative (with consent from other UK nations), all Welsh-language broadcasting devolved, Welsh government control of the Channel 3 licence (ITV) in Wales with increased Welsh content and improved BBC feedback forum for improvement of BBC policies.

In June 2022, the members of a new expert panel were announced for the devolution of communications and broadcasting powers to Wales as part of the co-operation agreement between the Welsh Government and Plaid Cymru.

It was revealed in November 2022 that former first minister of Wales, Carwyn Jones was offered the devolution of S4C by the Secretary of State for Culture, Media and Sport at the time, Jeremy Hunt. Jones said that he could not agree to devolution of the channel because it was offered “without a budget and without a penny". The chair of Cymdeithas yr Iaith ("The Language Society") said that Jones should have accepted the offer and explored other means of funding, adding, “It’s been obvious for years that the Westminster Government is not interested in S4C. In 2010 it cut S4C’s funding significantly and the channel’s funding now comes through the BBC; S4C also has to share a number of resources with the BBC. So it’s not much surprise Westminster wants to wash their hands of the channel."

UK Culture Minister Margot James said that broadcasting would remain a reserved power and is “the sort of thing which brings the union together”.

==== Rail infrastructure ====
Rail infrastructure funding is the responsibility of Network Rail and the UK Government but there are calls from the Welsh Government and cross-party agreement in the Senedd for the devolution of rail infrastructure to Wales, according to Ken Skates AM, Minister for Economy and Transport in a proposal for devolution document. The UK Government offered to devolve rail infrastructure to Wales in 2005 but the Welsh Assembly Government of the time refused the proposal, citing concerns around funding, the weakness of the Welsh civil service and possible issues arising from the levels of integration between Wales's rail infrastructure with England's. The Wales Governance Centre at Cardiff University has concluded that Wales could have had an additional £514 million for investment from 2011 to 2012 and 2019 to 2020 if rail infrastructure was devolved during this period.

HS2's classification as an England and Wales project, whilst being entirely in England has also been used as a reason for rail infrastructure devolution, with Westminster Welsh Affairs committee finding that HS2 will not benefit Wales and needs better north–south links. This classification means that Wales "loses out" on £5bn of rail spending. Mark Drakeford has suggested that rail infrastructure should be devolved, saying "the union connectivity review that the UK Government established concluded that devolution had been good for transport" and added that "successive Welsh Governments have made for the devolution of responsibility in rail to the Senedd, accompanied though, as Ken Skates has said, by the funding that needs to go alongside that responsibility.”

In March 2023, a second rail project, Northern Powerhouse Rail was classified as an England and Wales project, meaning Wales would not receive a £1bn Barnett consequential. Plaid Cymru MP Liz Saville Roberts again called for the full devolution of rail infrastructure.

The UK government said that devolution of rail network was considered as part of the St David's Day process, suggesting that its devolution did not political consensus. The UK government added that it would not devolve rail infrastructure and did not intent to revisit discussions.

==== Shared Prosperity Fund ====
The Shared Prosperity Fund is a UK government fund that replaced the European Structural Funds following Brexit from the EU. European Structural Funding to Wales averaged £375m during EU membership with decision making by the Welsh government. Labour leader Keir Starmer has promised to devolve the EU replacement fund to the Welsh government, if Labour is elected in the 2024 United Kingdom general election. Plaid Cymru have also introduced a Bill for the devolution of the Shared Prosperity Fund. A UK Government spokesman said that the UK Shared Prosperity Fund would match previous EU funding in Wales.

==== Energy firm taxation and regulation ====
In 2022, Adam Price, leader of Plaid Cymru, suggested that the power to tax and regulate energy firms should be devolved to Wales in the wake of the energy price crisis in the UK and a 54% rise in energy price cap. Mark Drakeford, although agreeing with the sentiment that the price cap should be lowered, believed that it was a matter of getting a UK government to "do the right thing".

==== Equality Act: gender identity ====
In February 2022, an action plan confirmed that the Welsh labour government would “seek the devolution of powers in relation to Gender Recognition and support our trans community” and suggested that the powers could be devolved “in the short term”. David TC Davies said he would not devolve the powers to Wales. A UK government equality hub spokesperson has said, "there are no plans to reform the Gender Recognition Act in England or Wales".

==== Regional devolution ====
In February 2023, the Welsh Government scrapped various planned road infrastructure projects in North Wales, including a potential Third Menai Crossing. Clwyd South MS and former Welsh transport minister, Ken Skates, subsequently argued that the Welsh Government should devolve powers over road and rail infrastructure and planning, from Cardiff to North Wales.

== Status ==
=== Political parties position ===
Plaid Cymru supports further devolution for Wales as well as independence. Wales Green Party and Gwlad also both support Welsh independence whilst Propel supports national sovereignty for Wales.

Welsh Labour and the Welsh Liberal Democrats support further devolution for Wales, as well as reform/federalism of the United Kingdom.

The Welsh Conservatives support the devolution system as it currently stands.

In September 2025, Reform UK ruled out including abolition of the Senedd in their 2026 manifesto, after Laura Anne Jones, the party's sole Member of the Senedd, made comments that it cannot be ruled out.

The UK Independence Party campaigned for a referendum to abolish it in the 2021 election, while the Abolish the Welsh Assembly Party are a single-issue party who campaign to abolish devolution.

=== Opposition ===
==== Legitimacy ====
Questions over the legitimacy of Welsh devolved bodies are centred on the low voter turnout for Senedd elections. Every election to the Assembly, and later Senedd, until 2026, had been under 50% of the Welsh electorate. The first election in 1999 had a 46% turnout, while the 2021 Senedd election had a 46.8% turnout, in comparison the 2021 Scottish Parliament election had 63.2%. With Welsh devolved elections having a "significantly lower turnout" to both the devolved elections in Scotland and Northern Ireland, and with UK general elections", as much as a 20% difference by 2022 with the latter. The only elections at the same level that were lower were to the Greater London Assembly. However, in the 2026 Senedd election, turnout did exceed 50%, at 51.7%, the highest in a devolved election.

The low turnout in 1999, led to questions whether devolution can revitalise representative democracy and whether the assembly itself was legitimate. While the establishment of devolution in Scotland in 1999, was hailed as the "settled will of the Scottish people", Welsh devolution had been described as "contested" due to a "narrow and half-hearted mandate" at the 1997 referendum, where 50.3% voted in favour compared to 49.7% against, on a 50.1% turnout. A previous 1979 referendum for a Welsh assembly was resoundingly rejected, while the 2011 Welsh devolution referendum had a turnout of 35.2%.

The low turnout has been credited to the confusion over what the Senedd is and is not responsible for, and the prevalence of England-based media in Wales, possibly leading to the lack of clarity. Ieuan Wyn Jones, former Plaid Cymru leader, described it as a "political and media deficit", and the turnout "does worry one because you need legitimacy". Carwyn Jones, former Labour First Minister, stated it is not a question on devolution itself, but there is "a deficit in Wales when it comes to media coverage", which Jones said was not as strong as Scotland's.

==== Campaigns for abolition ====
There have been calls to abolish the Welsh parliament. Those campaigning for it have been sometimes described as "devo-sceptics", although pledges to maintain the status quo of devolution have also been described with the term.

The Abolish the Welsh Assembly Party is a political party committed to the policy. In 2021, it was polled to win four seats to the Senedd, the legislature it aimed to abolish.

While the Welsh Conservatives have had some candidates connected to the idea. Presently the party is split between pro-devolution and anti-devolution camps. In 2025, leader Darren Millar dismissed calls to scrap Wales' devolved parliament. The party's previous leader Andrew RT Davies faced criticism for raising the debate on devolution at an agricultural show in 2024. The official policy of the party is to support Welsh devolution.

In September 2025, Reform UK ruled out including abolition of the Senedd in their 2026 manifesto, after Laura Anne Jones, the party's then sole Member of the Senedd, made comments that it cannot be ruled out.

A 2024 YouGov poll showed 31% of the public supported abolition, while 46% opposed the end to devolution.

=== Alternatives to devolution ===
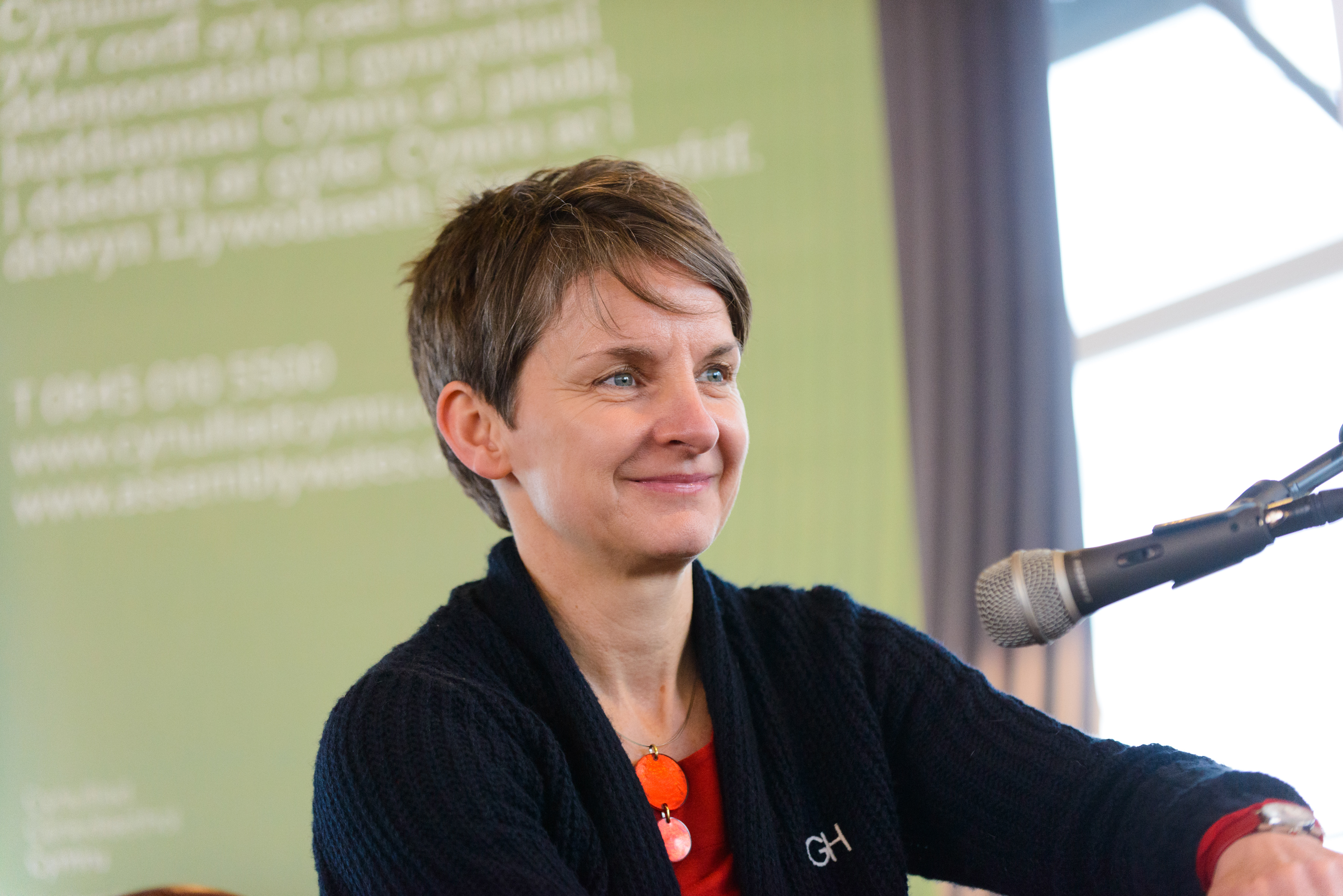
Laura McAllister

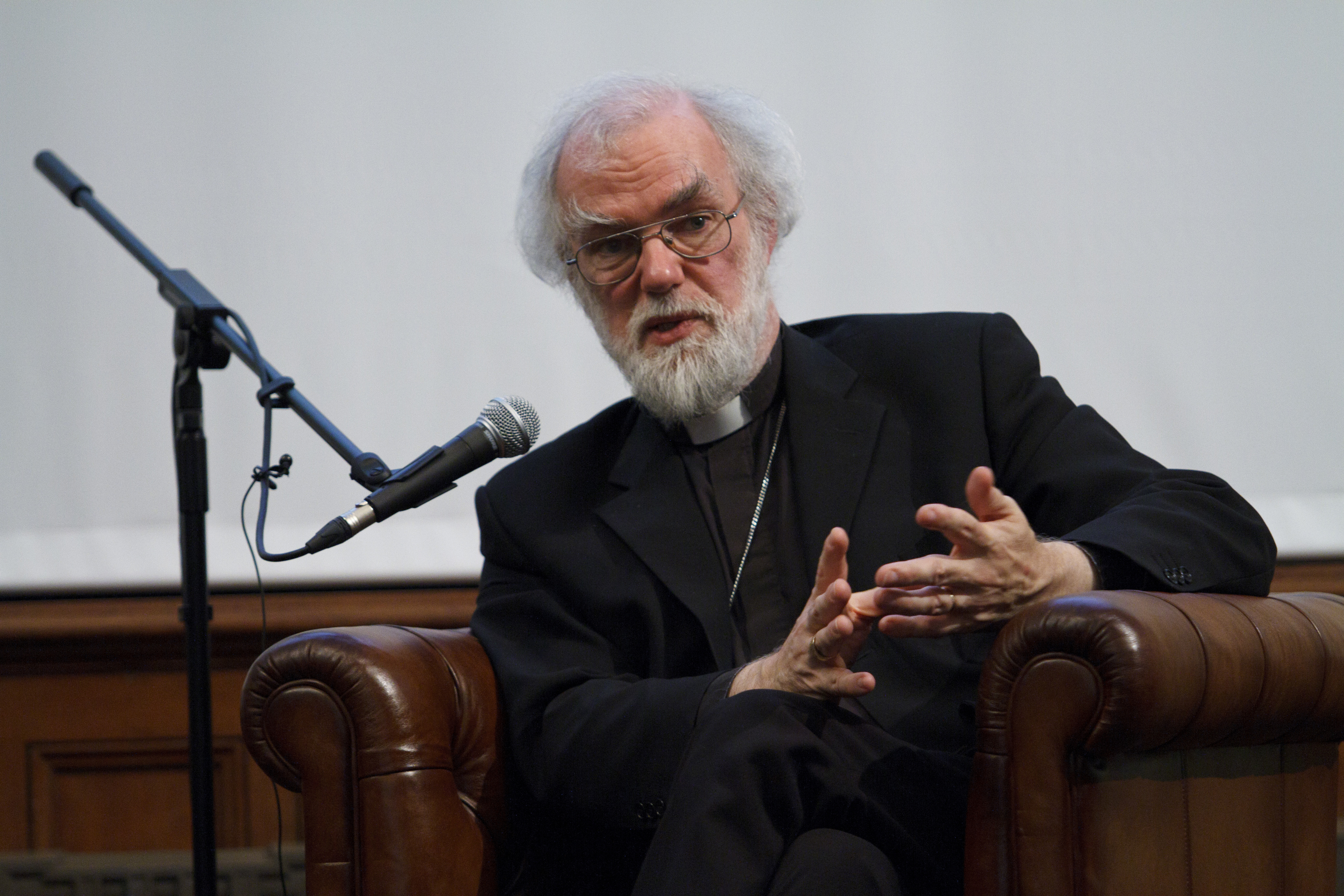
Rowan Williams

In 2011 the Welsh electorate voted in a referendum to give greater legislative powers to the National Assembly for Wales. The Independent Commission on the Constitutional Future of Wales was a commission established by the Welsh Government that will make recommendations about Wales’ constitutional future and the powers of the Senedd. Having their first meeting on the 25 November 2021, Professor Laura McAllister and Dr Rowan Williams are co-chairing the commission with McAllister stating that all options are on the table, including independence. The commission has two main objectives which are consideration and development of options for reform of constitutional structures of the UK, and progressive principal options to strengthen Welsh democracy and deliver improvements for Wales. The interim findings of the commission outlined three viable options for Wales, to be explored in more depth in 2023:

1. Entrenched devolution
2. Federal structures
3. Independence

==== Option 1: Entrenched devolution ====
This is the first of the three constitutional options for Wales as proposed by the Independent Commission on the Constitutional Future of Wales. This option includes:

- Protection against unilateral changes by the UK Parliament and Government
- More constructive intergovernmental relations
- More stable foundation for Welsh governance in the future
- Potential expansion of devolved powers, including justice and policing.

This option has been described as providing greater stability and requiring minimal changes for other countries of the UK.

On 5 December 2022, The UK Labour party announced that if elected, they would reform the house of lords to form a Council of the Nations and Regions. They would also devolve to the Senedd; Jobcentre plus, youth justice and probation service and access to British Regional Investment Bank. This plan have been described as almost being like a federal state.

==== Option 2: Federalism ====
The Independent Commission on the Constitutional Future of Wales proposes the following reform for this option:

- The UK Parliament and Government's responsibility for the UK is separate to England
- Reform of the House of Lords
- Devolved financial responsibility for taxation
- Optional devolved financial responsibility for welfare

The Welsh Labour Party manifesto supports "far-reaching federalism" with powers equal Scotland and Northern Ireland.

==== Option 3: Independence ====
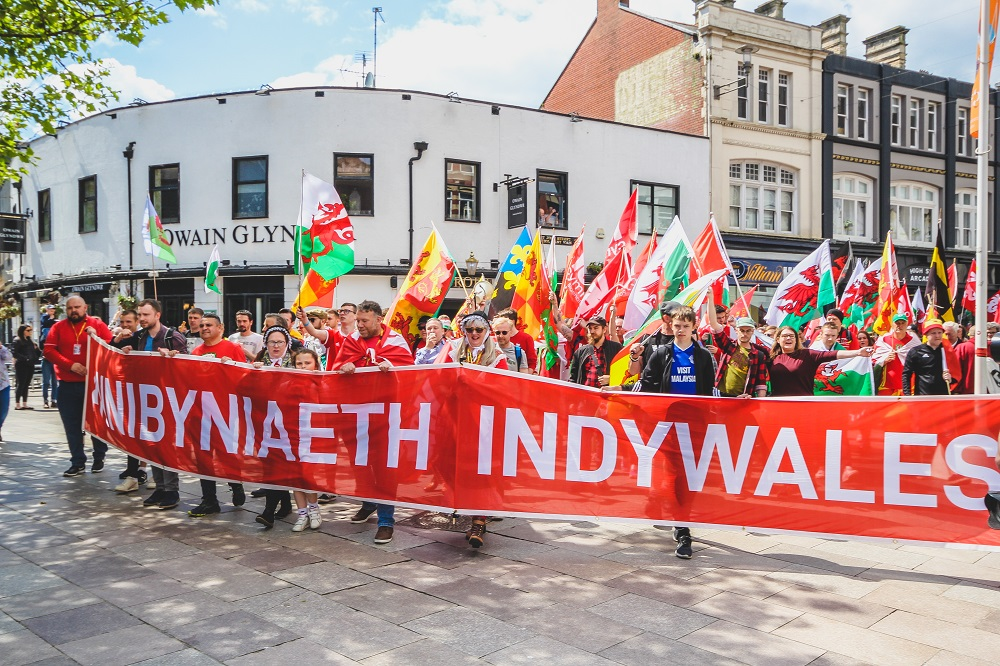
Independence supporters in Cardiff, 2019.

With independence, the commission states, Wales would become a sovereign country, and would be able to apply for full membership of the United Nations and other international organisations. As an independent country, Wales would be free to choose from a variety of governance options which could include agreements with other parts of the UK, such as in a free association or a confederation.

== Referendum results ==
Referendums on devolution
Date Conducted	Question/Statement	Support Devolution (%)	Against Devolution (%)	Turnout (%)
3 March 2011	Do you want the Assembly now to be able to make laws on all matters in the 20 subject areas it has powers for?	63.5	36.5	35.2
18 September 1997	(i) I agree that there should be a Welsh Assembly; or (ii) I do not agree that there should be a Welsh Assembly	50.3	49.7	51.3
1 March 1979	Do you want the provisions of the Wales Act 1978 to be put into effect?	20.3	79.7	58.8

== Opinion polling ==
=== Polls on devolution status ===
==== Polls on powers ====
Note: On 4 March 2011, 63.5% voted to devolve primary lawmaking powers for the areas already devolved to the Senedd.

Constitutional status polls
Date(s) conducted	Polling organisation	Support independence (%)	Support more powers for the Senedd (%)	Support status quo (%)	Support fewer powers for the Senedd (%)	Support abolition of the Senedd (%)	Indifferent/ don't know (%)	Combined total: more powers (%)	Combined total: no more powers (%)
5-25 June 2023	Beaufort Research / WalesOnline	16	23	25	6	17	13	39	48
12-17 May 2023	YouGov / Barn Cymru	13	21	20	7	20	16	34	47
3-7 February 2023	YouGov / Barn Cymru	15	20	21	7	20	16	35	50
25 November - 1 December 2022	YouGov / Barn Cymru	14	21	23	7	20	14	35	50
20-22 September 2022	YouGov	17	19	21	7	19	15	36	47
28 January – 21 February 2021	BBC / ICM Unlimited	14	35	27	3	15	6	49	45
4–22 February 2020	BBC / ICM	11	43	25	2	14	3	54	41
7–23 February 2019	BBC / ICM	7	46	27	3	13	4	53	43
December 2018	SkyData	8	40	23	4	18	7	48	45
February 2017	BBC / ICM	6	44	29	3	13	4	50	45
31 January 2017	Wales Act 2017 is passed								
February 2016	BBC / ICM	6	43	30	3	13	4	49	46
February 2015	BBC / ICM	6	40	33	4	13	4	46	50
17 December 2014	Wales Act 2014 passed								
19-22 September 2014	BBC / ICM	3	49	26	2	12	6	52	40
18 September 2014	2014 Scottish independence referendum								
February 2014	BBC / ICM	5	37	28	3	23	5	42	54
2013	BBC / ICM	9	36	28	2	20	4	45	50
2012	BBC / ICM	7	36	29	2	22	4	43	55
2011	BBC / ICM	11	35	18	17	15	4	46	50
3 March 2011	2011 Welsh devolution referendum								
January 2011	ITV Wales / YouGov	n/a	49	26	n/a	n/a	26	n/a	n/a
2010	BBC / ICM	11	40	13	18	13	4	51	44
June 2007	BBC / ICM	n/a	47	44	n/a	n/a	9	n/a	n/a

==== Polls on parliament ====
Polls on devolved parliament Question: Should Wales Have Its Own Parliament?
Date published	Publisher	Yes Parliament (%)	No Parliament (%)	Do not know (%)	Lead	Notes
2–8 September 2024	YouGov	46	31	24	15	Non-standard question: Abolition question
18–19 May 2024	Redfield & Wilton Strategies	60	31	9	29	
22–23 April 2024	Redfield & Wilton Strategies	60	30	10	30	
23–24 March 2024	Redfield & Wilton Strategies	55	32	13	23	
18 February 2024	Redfield & Wilton Strategies	55	34	11	21	
24–26 January 2024	Redfield & Wilton Strategies	59	32	9	27	
10–11 December 2023	Redfield & Wilton Strategies	60	30	10	30	
12–13 November 2023	Redfield & Wilton Strategies	55	33	11	22	
14–15 October 2023	Redfield & Wilton Strategies	58	32	10	26	
16–17 September 2023	Redfield & Wilton Strategies	65	22	13	43	
13–14 August 2023	Redfield & Wilton Strategies	60	28	12	32	
14–16 July 2023	Redfield & Wilton Strategies	66	27	8	39	
17–18 June 2023	Redfield & Wilton Strategies	61	30	9	31	
14–15 May 2023	Redfield & Wilton Strategies	63	28	10	35	
15–17 April 2023	Redfield & Wilton Strategies	63	25	12	38	

==== Other ====
Polls on devolved powers
Date Published	Publisher	Question/Statement	Disagree with removing powers (%)	Agree with removing powers (%)
2021	UK in a Changing Europe Using Welsh Election Study (WES) data in a report "British Politics after Brexit".	Brexit should not be used as an excuse to undermine the Senedd VS The UK Government is right to remove powers from the Senedd if it is necessary to maximise Brexit benefits	71	29

Date Published	Publisher	"Do you support or oppose the following potential constitutional settlements for Wales?"	Total Support (%)	Total Oppose (%)	Don't Know (%)
2–8 September 2024	YouGov	A fully independent Wales outside of the United Kingdom	24	61	15
2–8 September 2024	YouGov	An autonomous Welsh parliament and government within the United Kingdom with powers over everything except defence and foreign affairs	32	42	27
2–8 September 2024	YouGov	A devolved Welsh parliament and government with more powers than it currently has	40	37	22
2–8 September 2024	YouGov	A devolved Welsh parliament and government with the level of powers that it currently has	39	35	27
2–8 September 2024	YouGov	A devolved Welsh parliament and government with fewer powers than it currently has	23	52	25
2–8 September 2024	YouGov	Abolition of the devolved Welsh parliament and government	31	46	24

Polls on the status of the Senedd
Date(s) conducted	Polling organisation	Question/Statement	Support devolution (excluding don't know) (%)	Abolish the Senedd (excluding don't know) (%)	Do not know (%)	Abstain / Would not vote (%)
19 – 22 February 2021	YouGov	If there was a referendum tomorrow on abolishing the Senedd (Welsh Parliament) and this was the question, how would you vote? Should Wales abolish the Senedd (Welsh Parliament)?	45 (62)	28 (38)	17	10
1997	The Guardian / ICM	On establishing a National Assembly for Wales	37 (51)	36 (49)	27	n/a

Polls on increased devolved powers
Date(s) conducted	Polling organisation	Question/Statement	Age 18-24 Yes:No (%)	Age 25-49 Yes:No (%)	Age 50-64 Yes:No (%)	Age 65+ Yes:No (%)	Yes (%, excluding don't know)	No (%, excluding don't know)	Do not know (%)	Abstain / Would not vote (%)	Refused
11–16 November 2020	YouGov	If there was a referendum tomorrow on the transferring of more powers to the Senedd (Welsh Parliament), including control of tax and welfare, but excluding defence and foreign affairs, how would you vote? Should more powers be transferred to the Senedd (Welsh Parliament)?	55:12	41:15	40:39	32:43	40 (59)	28 (41)	20	10	3

Polls in the absence of devolution, by political party
Date(s) conducted	Polling organisation & client	Sample size	Independence (inc. sub-samples)					No devolved government (inc. sub-samples)					Indifferent / no reply (%)
Date(s) conducted	Polling organisation & client	Sample size	Total (%)	Conservative (%)	Labour (%)	Lib Dem (%)	Plaid Cymru (%)	Total (%)	Conservative (%)	Labour (%)	Lib Dem (%)	Plaid Cymru (%)	Indifferent / no reply (%)
29 May – 1 June 2020	ITV Wales / YouGov / Cardiff Uni	1,021	33%	12%	45%	39%	87%	45%	79%	35%	53%	4%	21%

== See also ==
- Proposed Welsh independence referendum
- Welsh devolution
- Devolution in the United Kingdom
- Devolved, reserved and excepted matters
