= Opinion polling on Welsh independence =

Opinion polling on Welsh independence is continually being carried out by various organisations to gauge public attitudes to independence. The dates for these opinion polls range from January 2007 to the present day. Polling was initially sporadic, but was then carried out almost every month from January 2021 until June 2024, and has been sporadic again since. The question typically asked by pollsters is "Should Wales be an independent country?".

== Public opinion ==
=== Graphical summary ===
A graphical summary of yes/no independence polls, excluding non-standard questions.

View chart definition.

=== Yes/No Independence polls ===
Date(s) conducted	Polling organisation & client	Sample size	Should Wales be an independent country?			Lead	Notes
Date(s) conducted	Polling organisation & client	Sample size	Yes	No	Undecided	Lead	Notes
7-13 September 2026	YouGov	845	20%	tbc	tbc	tbc	
13–24 August 2026	Survation	1023	26%	51%	23%	25%	
7 May 2026	2026 Senedd election						
5–12 January 2026	YouGov / BarnCymru	1220	26%	54%	12%	28%	
24–27 March 2025	Redfield and Wilton Strategies	960	35%	50%	15%	15%	
2–8 September 2024	YouGov	1207	24%	61%	15%	37%	
5–7 June 2024	Redfield and Wilton Strategies	960	33%	57%	10%	24%	
18–19 May 2024	Redfield and Wilton Strategies	900	29%	59%	12%	30%	
23–24 March 2024	Redfield and Wilton Strategies	878	30%	58%	11%	28%	
18 February 2024	Redfield and Wilton Strategies	874	27%	61%	12%	34%	
24–26 January 2024	Redfield and Wilton Strategies	1,100	30%	59%	11%	29%	
10–11 December 2023	Redfield & Wilton Strategies	1,086	34%	58%	9%	24%	
4–7 December 2023	YouGov / Barn Cymru	1,004	22%	56%	14%	34%	
12–13 November 2023	Redfield & Wilton Strategies	1,100	33%	56%	12%	23%	
14–15 October 2023	Redfield & Wilton Strategies	959	31%	59%	9%	28%	
1–6 September 2023	YouGov		22%	56%	13%	34%	
13–14 August 2023	Redfield & Wilton Strategies	1,068	33%	53%	14%	20%	
14–16 July 2023	Redfield & Wilton Strategies	1,050	32%	58%	10%	26%	
17–18 June 2023	Redfield & Wilton Strategies	1,000	30%	57%	13%	27%	
12–17 May 2023	YouGov / Barn Cymru	1,064	20%	54%	15%	34%	
14–15 May 2023	Redfield and Wilton Strategies	1,058	32%	58%	11%	26%	
15–17 April 2023	Redfield and Wilton Strategies	1,251	29%	60%	11%	31%	
17–23 Feb 2023	YouGov / WalesOnline	1,083	18%	55%	16%	37%	
25 Nov – 1 Dec 2022	YouGov / Barn Cymru	1,042	22%	55%	14%	33%	
21–25 November 2022	YouGov / YesCymru	1,033	23%	54%	13%	31%	
20–22 September 2022	YouGov / Barn Cymru	1,014	24%	52%	14%	28%	Age 16+
16–19 August 2022	YouGov / The Sunday Times	1,025	30%	48%	13%	18%	Non-standard question: If Liz Truss became Prime Minister of the UK
16–19 August 2022	YouGov / The Sunday Times	1,025	25%	53%	12%	28%	
12–16 June 2022	YouGov / ITV Wales	1,020	25%	50%	25%	25%	
25 Feb – 1 March 2022	YouGov/ Barn Cymru	1,086	21%	53%	26%	32%	Age 16+
6 May 2021	2021 Senedd election						
5 May 2021	Savanta ComRes	1,002	30%	55%	15%	25%	Taken with 29 April – 4 May 2021 poll, online
2–4 May 2021	YouGov / Welsh Barometer	1,071	21%	55%	14%	34%	
29 April – 4 May 2021	Savanta ComRes	1,002	27%	58%	14%	31%	Online
23–28 April 2021	Savanta ComRes	1,002	42%	49%	8%	7%	46% (excluding "don't know"), the highest ever level of support.
18–21 April 2021	YouGov	1,142	22%	54%	24%	32%	Age 16+
9–19 April 2021	Opinium / Sky News	2,005	28%	52%	19%	24%	
16–19 March 2021	Welsh Barometer Survey / YouGov	1,174	22%	55%	23%	33%	Age 16+
18–22 February 2021	Savanta ComRes / ITV News	1,003	35%	55%	10%	20%	39% (excluding "don't know"), the highest ever support at the time. Age 16+.
19–22 February 2021	WalesOnline / YouGov	1,059	25%	50%	14%	25%	Age 16+
18–21 January 2021	The Sunday Times / YouGov	1,059	23%	52%	25%	29%	Age 16+
11–14 January 2021	Welsh Barometer Survey / YouGov	1,018	22%	53%	25%	31%	Age 16+
26–29 October 2020	Welsh Barometer Survey / YouGov	1,013	23%	53%	25%	30%	Age 16+
24–27 August 2020	YesCymru / YouGov	1,044	25%	52%	23%	27%	
29 July – 7 August 2020	YesCymru / YouGov	1,044	26%	55%	19%	29%	Age 16+
29 May – 1 June 2020	ITV Wales / YouGov / Cardiff Uni	1,021	25%	54%	21%	29%	
20–26 January 2020	Welsh Barometer Survey / YouGov	1,037	21%	57%	22%	36%	Age 16+
6–9 December 2019	Welsh Barometer Survey / YouGov	1,020	17%	60%	23%	43%	
22–25 November 2019	Welsh Barometer Survey / YouGov	1,116	20%	57%	22%	37%	
31 October – 4 November 2019	Welsh Barometer Survey / YouGov	1,032	22%	57%	21%	35%	
10–14 October 2019	Welsh Barometer Survey / YouGov	1,032	21%	57%	23%	36%	
6–10 September 2019	Plaid Cymru / YouGov	1,039	24%	52%	23%	28%	
6–10 September 2019	Plaid Cymru / YouGov	1,039	33%	48%	20%	15%	Non-standard question: If an independent Wales was within the European Union
7–14 December 2018	Sky News Data: Wales	1,014	17%	67%	16%	50%	
30 May – 6 June 2018	YouGov	2,016	19%	65%	16%	46%	
July 2016	ITV Wales / YouGov	1,010	15%	65%	20%	50%	
July 2016	ITV Wales / YouGov	1,010	28%	53%	20%	25%	Non-standard question: If an independent Wales was within the European Union
July 2016	ITV Wales / YouGov	1,010	19%	61%	21%	42%	Non-standard question: If Scotland left the UK
6 May 2016	2016 Senedd election						
8–11 September 2014	ITV Wales / YouGov / Cardiff University	>1,000	17%	70%	13%	53%	The week before the Scottish independence referendum
April 2014	YouGov	1,000	12%	74%	14%	62%	
March 2013	ITV Wales / YouGov	Unknown	10%	62%	28%	52%	Non-standard question: If Scotland left the UK
5 May 2011	2011 National Assembly for Wales election						
5–8 January 2007	BBC / Opinion Research Business	527	19%	69%	13%	50%	Would you like the Union to continue as it is or would you like to see it come to an end? If it were to end this would mean that Wales became an independent country.

"0–10" Independence polls – (Respondents asked to rate 0–10. 0–4 Against, 5 indifferent, 6–10 In Favour. "Don't Know" removed)

Date(s) conducted	Polling organisation & client	Sample size	Total favourable	In favour					Indifferent	Against					Total unfavourable
Date(s) conducted	Polling organisation & client	Sample size	Total favourable	10	9	8	7	6	5	4	3	2	1	0	Total unfavourable
10–15 May 2019	YesCymru / YouGov	1,133	36%	14%	4%	5%	6%	7%	17%	5%	6%	6%	2%	28%	47%
9–12 May 2017	YesCymru / YouGov	1,000	29%	10%	2%	6%	6%	5%	18%	4%	6%	7%	5%	31%	53%

==== By age (August 2026) ====
Age group	No	Yes	Do not know	Lead
18–24	29%	41%	29%	12%
25–34	35%	39%	24%	4%
35–44	29%	38%	32%	9%
45–54	51%	21%	28%	30%
55–64	56%	22%	22%	34%
65+	74%	12%	24%	62%

==== By age (January 2026) ====
Age group	No	Yes	Do not know	Lead
18–24	29%	47%	14%	18%
25–49	48%	29%	16%	19%
50–64	58%	20%	12%	38%
65+	72%	17%	7%	55%

==== By age (February 2023) ====
Age group	No	Yes	Do not know	Lead
18–24	41%	20%	16%	21%
25–49	44%	18%	23%	26%
50–64	59%	22%	12%	37%
65+	72%	12%	11%	60%

==== Devolution extent polls ====
Date(s) Conducted	Polling organisation	Support independence (%)	Support more powers for the Senedd (%)	Support status quo (%)	Support fewer powers for the Senedd (%)	Support abolition of the Senedd (%)	Indifferent/Did not reply/Other (%)
5-25 June 2023	Beaufort Research / WalesOnline	16	23	25	6	17	13
12-17 May 2023	YouGov / Barn Cymru	13	21	20	7	20	16
3-7 February 2023	YouGov / Barn Cymru	15	20	21	7	20	16
25 November - 1 December 2022	YouGov / Barn Cymru	14	21	23	7	20	14
20-22 September 2022	YouGov	17	19	21	7	19	15
28 January – 21 February 2021	BBC / ICM Unlimited	14	35	27	3	15	6
29 May – 1 June 2020	ITV Wales & Cardiff University / YouGov	16	20	24	5	22	14
4–22 February 2020	BBC / ICM	11	43	25	2	14	3
7–23 February 2019	BBC / ICM	7	46	27	3	13	4
December 2018	SkyData	8	40	23	4	18	7
February 2017	BBC / ICM	6	44	29	3	13	4
February 2016	BBC / ICM	6	43	30	3	13	4
February 2015	BBC / ICM	6	40	33	4	13	4
September 2014	BBC / ICM	3	49	26	2	12	6
February 2014	BBC / ICM	5	37	28	3	23	5
2013	BBC / ICM	9	36	28	2	20	4
2012	BBC / ICM	7	36	29	2	22	4
2011	BBC / ICM	11	35	18	17	15	4
2010	BBC / ICM	11	40	13	18	13	4

Side by side polls – Independence vs. No devolved government in Wales

Date(s) conducted	Polling Organisation & client	Sample size	Independence (inc. sub-samples)					No devolved government (inc. sub-samples)					Indifferent / no reply (%)
Date(s) conducted	Polling Organisation & client	Sample size	Total (%)	Conservative (%)	Labour (%)	Lib Dem (%)	Plaid Cymru (%)	Total (%)	Conservative (%)	Labour (%)	Lib Dem (%)	Plaid Cymru (%)	Indifferent / no reply (%)
29 May – 1 June 2020	ITV Wales / YouGov / Cardiff Uni	1,021	33%	12%	45%	39%	87%	45%	79%	35%	53%	4%	21%

== See also ==
- Proposed Welsh independence referendum#Opinion polling
