= Independent Nation: Should Wales Leave the UK? =

Book by Will Hayward

- Author: Will Hayward
- Subject: Wales
- Genre: Non fiction
- Publisher: Biteback Publishing
- Publication date: 30 August 2022
- ISBN: 9781785907630

Independent Nation: Should Wales Leave the UK? is a book about Welsh independence by journalist Will Hayward. It has been published by Biteback Publishing on 30 August 2022.

== About ==
Author, the journalist Will Hayward

The book discusses the country's feelings about Welsh independence and aims to improve the quality of the debate about it. Hayward says, "[T]he idea of the book is two different people could read this book and they could come to a different conclusion based on their attitude to risk, their income and whereabouts they live in Wales."

In a review for the Institute of Welsh Affairs, Glyndwr Jones describes the book as an impartial, well-informed and enjoyable read which objectively examines the truth and false of the Welsh independence debate. The West Lothian question is raised about the lack of an English parliament for England only. The book also mentions the poor decisions of the UK government which include:

- An absence of a Barnett consequential for Wales and Scotland after the DUP deal which involved £1 billion for Northern Ireland
- The negative impact of the United Kingdom Internal Market Act 2020 on Welsh devolution
- Classing HS2 as an "England and Wales" project despite no track in Wales at all, meaning Wales loses out on £5 billion

The book notes the fractured relationship between the UK and Welsh governments and discusses both supportive and opposing views of Welsh independence. Hayward discusses currency, EU, and energy generation among other factors and Hayward concludes, "I could be convinced, but am not yet".

Journalist Ifan Morgan Jones says that the book is likely to make a significant impact on the debate surrounding an independent Wales and uses a matter of fact style with informative constructive advice. Huw Edwards notes in the foreword of the book that there hasn't been much discussion about the details of independence. The strengths of the book include the wealth of interview research with lesser aspects including some lack of discussion about identity and nationalism and the importance of a strong national media industry.

On 7 December 2022, Hayward discussed his book alongside Gerry Hassan to discuss his book Scotland Rising: The Case for Independence. They appeared at the City Arms pub in Cardiff for the debate.
