= Parliament for Wales Campaign =

Political campaign in Wales

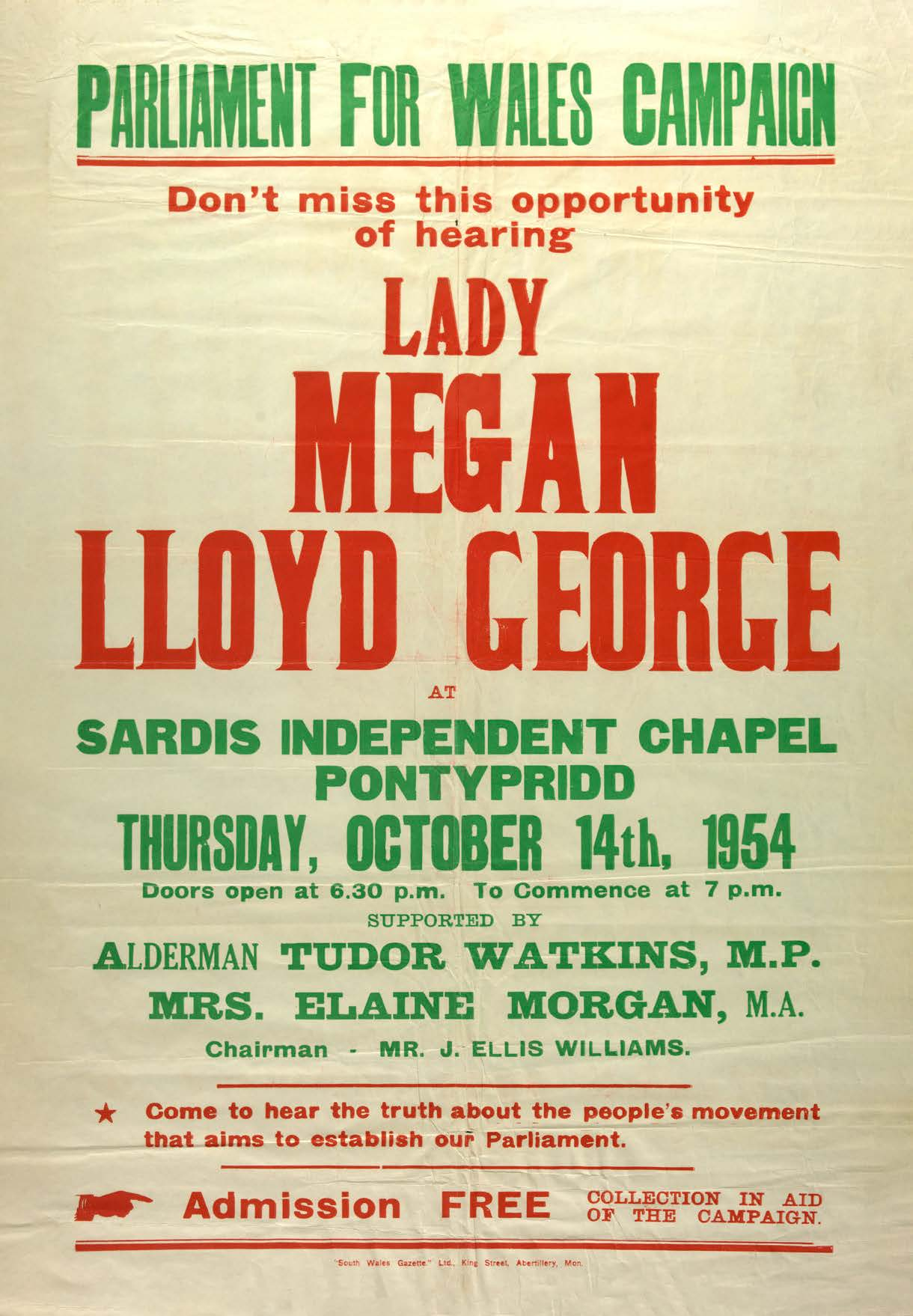
Poster for a Parliament for Wales campaign speech by Lady Megan Lloyd George in Pontypridd.

The Parliament for Wales Campaign (Welsh: Ymgyrch Senedd i Gymru) was a political campaign for a Welsh parliament (also known as a "Senedd") of elected representatives in Wales. This campaign was also known as a "Campaign for a Welsh Assembly".

== History ==
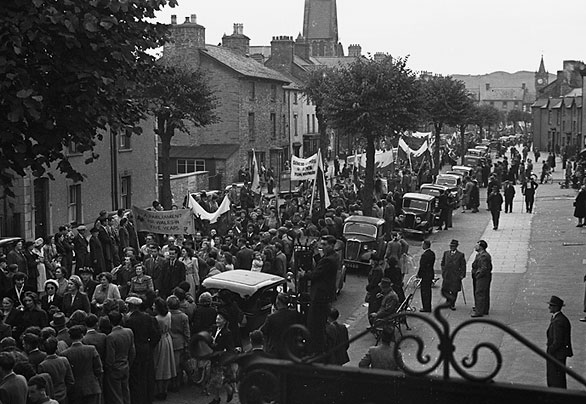
A Plaid Cymru rally in Machynlleth in 1949 where the "Parliament for Wales in 5 years" campaign was started

=== First parade ===
Those in favour of a Welsh parliament paraded in Machynlleth (the place of Owain Glyndŵr's last Senedd) on 1 October 1949. Speakers and entertainment were also at the event.

=== Parliament for Wales Campaign 1950-1956 ===
From 1950 to 1956, Parliament for Wales Campaign brought devolution back onto the political agenda. A cross-party campaign was led by Lady Megan Lloyd George, daughter of former prime minister and campaigner for Welsh devolution, David Lloyd George, who had died in 1945. The Campaign for a Welsh parliament (Ymgyrch Senedd i Gymru) was formally launched on 1 July 1950, at a rally in Llandrindod. This event lead to the creation of a petition of 240,652 names calling for the establishment of a Welsh parliament, which was presented to the House of Commons by Megan Lloyd George in 1956. This was rejected by the UK government. Petitions were also presented to the House of Commons for a Secretary of State for Wales which were also rejected. Following the pressure for a Welsh parliament, the UK government instead formed the Council for Wales and Monmouthshire in 1948 as an advisory body to the UK government composed of UK government-appointed members, but no elected members.

=== Following the establishment of the National Assembly ===
The Campaign for a Senate was set up following the 1987 general election and the Campaign for a Welsh Assembly (Ymgyrch dros Senedd i Gymru) was officially launched in Merthyr Tydfil on 26 November 1988, following multiple meetings in Wales the previous year. Their activities were conducted bilingually. The name of the organisation was changed in 1993 following the recommendation of the National Council to The Parliament for Wales Campaign (Ymgyrch Senedd i Gymru) and remained a cross-party, non-partisan organisation with the aim of gaining support for an elected and legislative Parliament for Wales. In March 1994, the Campaign held a two-day democracy conference in Llandrindod which was attended by 250 people including political parties, churches, local authorities, and trade unions. The campaign prepared questionnaires and petitions and also placed advertisements in newspapers calling for devolution to Wales. Following the establishment of the National Assembly for Wales in 1998, the Parliament for Wales Campaign called for an assembly with similar legislative powers to the Scottish Parliament and the Northern Ireland Assembly.

In 2013, the campaign recommended increased powers for the then National Assembly for Wales to the Silk II commission.

Proposed powers included:

- Human Rights. As well as the Criminal Justice System.
- Richard Commission Report recommendation regarding the devolution of the Police and Courts, Animal Welfare, Rail services and Power generation.
- Further devolution of the Civil Service, Post Offices, Licensing, Bank Holidays, Social Security, Job Creation, Ports, Elections, Broadcasting, Higher Education Research and enhanced contracts with the privatized utilities.
- The right of Welsh Courts to interpret Welsh Law with a Welsh Jurisdiction. The Right to a representative of the Welsh Judiciary to sit on the Supreme Court in cases that involve Welsh Law and International Law concerning Welsh people.

== See also ==
- Welsh devolution
- Welsh independence
- Yes for Wales
