= Proposed Welsh independence referendum =

Political proposal

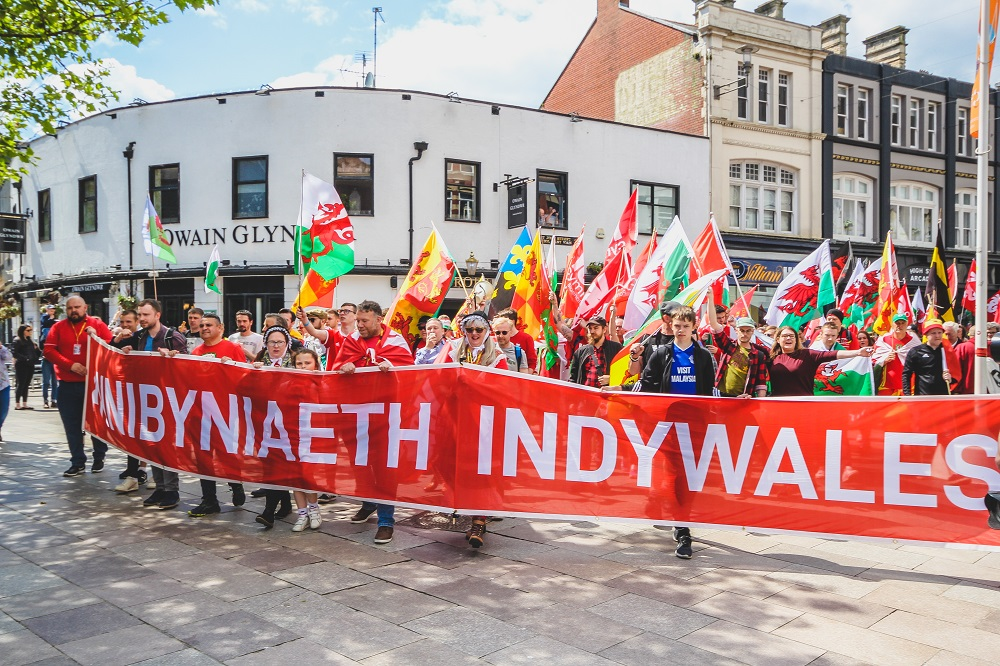
Welsh independence march in Cardiff, 11 May 2019.

A referendum on Welsh independence from the United Kingdom (UK) has been proposed by pro-independence supporters, including independence campaign group YesCymru, pro-independence political party Plaid Cymru and other groups and individuals. These follow similar calls for a proposed second Scottish independence referendum. Pro-independence party Plaid Cymru has pledged to hold a referendum should they win a majority of seats in the Senedd.

== Referendum proposals ==
In March 2017, following calls for a second referendum on Scottish independence, Plaid Cymru leader Leanne Wood said there needed to be a national debate on Welsh independence. In July 2020, Plaid brought forward a motion to discuss a referendum on Welsh independence, but it was rejected by 43 votes to 9.

In July 2020, Plaid Cymru tabled a motion for Welsh ministers to seek permission from Westminster for the right of the Senedd to legislate for a Welsh independence referendum. The members of Senedd rejected this motion by 43 votes to 9. This was the first time in history that Welsh independence was debated in the Senedd.

On 24 October 2020, Wales Green Party members voted at their party conference that the party would support Welsh independence in the event of a referendum being held on whether or not Wales should become independent from the United Kingdom.

On 11 December 2020, Plaid Cymru leader Adam Price stated that if his party won a majority at the 2021 Senedd election, an independence referendum would be held in its first term in office. At Plaid's special conference on independence, held on 13 February 2021, party members formally approved Price's pledge to hold a referendum in or before 2026.

A petition was made to the UK government and parliament requesting a referendum on Welsh independence which gathered over 8,000 signatures.

In August 2026, Yes Cymru announced that it would campaign for a Welsh independence referendum to be conducted in 2032.

== Route to a referendum ==
Emyr Lewis, Head of the Department of Law and Criminology at Aberystwyth University has said that there is no great difference between the situation in Wales and Scotland when it comes to the right to hold an independence without Westminster transfer of powers to do so. Under the Government of Wales Act 2006, the legislative powers of the Senedd, similarly to the Scottish Parliament cannot pass legislation that affects the constitution of the United Kingdom and the London Parliament.

Lewis notes that there is however a potential route for a referendum on independence without Westminster involvement. Under Section 64 of the Welsh Government Act 2006 however, the Welsh Government has the power to hold a poll (referendum) "for the purpose of ascertaining the views of those polled about whether or how any of the functions of the Welsh Ministers...should be exercised." Section 60 of the 2006 Act also states that the Welsh Government may do whatever is appropriate "in order to achieve...promote or improve the economic, social and environmental welfare of Wales". If the Welsh government considered independence to be a benefit to the economic welfare of Wales, it could potentially ask the opinion of the people of Wales in a referendum on independence. There is no section in the Scotland Act 1998, which corresponds to sections 60 or 64 which were in place at a time when the devolution settlement in Wales was different to what is it now. Lewis notes that a court of law may not accept section 60 in a broad sense that may apply to an independence referendum.

== Opposition ==
The leader of the Conservatives in Wales and the leader of the Liberal Democrats in Wales have shown opposition to a potential referendum on Welsh independence.

== Opinion polling ==
A YouGov poll in January 2021 found that 31% of people in Wales support holding a referendum on Welsh independence within the next five years with 47% opposing. In May 2021, a Redfield and Wilton Strategies poll of the British (not just Welsh) public, showed 30% opposed the Welsh having an independence referendum, while support and neithers were both 29%. 44% believed in such a referendum the pro-UK side would win, compared to 18% for pro-independence to win, and 38% who don't know which side would win in such a referendum.

Redfield and Wilton Strategies had been conducting polls on the issue. Their poll in April 2023 found that:

- 33% supported a referendum next year with 39% against, 21% choosing "neither" and 8% choosing "Don't know"
- 35% of Welsh voters supported a referendum on independence in 1-5 years with 34% opposing

While their poll in May 2023 found that:

- 32% supported a referendum next year with 36% opposing, 24% choosing "neither" and 7% opting for "Don't know"
- 35% of Welsh voters would support a referendum in 5 years with 32% opposing.

Their 17–18 June 2023 poll stated, on whether to hold a referendum in the next year:

- 39% oppose or strongly oppose a referendum in the next year, 30% support or strongly support, 22% neither and 8% do not know.
- 66% of 2019 Conservatives oppose or strongly oppose a referendum in the next year to 16% neither, 15% support or strongly support and 3% do not know.
- 42% of 2019 Labour voters support or strongly support a referendum in the next year to 28% oppose or strongly oppose, 23% neither and 7% do not know.
- 58% of 2019 Plaid Cymru voters support or strongly support a referendum in the next year to 17% neither, 17% oppose or strongly oppose and 7% do not know.
- When the time frame is increased to one to five years, a referendum was opposed by 35% and supported by 33%.

Their 14–16 July 2023 poll stated, on whether to hold a referendum in the next year:

- 39% oppose a referendum in the next year, 32% support, 25% neither and 4% do not know.
- When the time frame is increased to one to five years, a referendum was opposed and supported equally by 36%.

Their 13–14 August 2023 poll stated, on whether to hold a referendum in the next year:

- 34% oppose and 34% support a referendum in the next year, 23% neither and 9% do not know.
- When the time frame is increased to one to five years, a referendum was supported by 38% and opposed by 30%.

== See also ==
- Proposed further Welsh devolution
- 2014 Scottish independence referendum
- United Ireland
- English independence
- Potential breakup of the United Kingdom
