= Frontbench team =

Political term in the Westminster system

In the Westminster system of government, a frontbench team is the senior leadership of opposition parliamentarians, in particular in the British House of Commons and the Dáil Éireann.

== United Kingdom ==
Political party		Frontbench Team	Years
Liberal Party (UK)		Liberal Party Frontbench Team, 1945–1956	
Liberal Party (UK)		Liberal Party Frontbench Team, 1956–1967	
Liberal Party (UK)		Liberal Party Frontbench Team, 1967–1976	
Liberal Party (UK)		Liberal Party Frontbench Team, 1976–1988	
Liberal Democrats (UK)	Liberal Democrat frontbench team	Frontbench Team of Paddy Ashdown	1988–1999
Liberal Democrats (UK)	Liberal Democrat frontbench team	Frontbench Team of Charles Kennedy	1999–2006
Liberal Democrats (UK)	Liberal Democrat frontbench team	Frontbench Team of Menzies Campbell	2006–2007
Liberal Democrats (UK)	Liberal Democrat frontbench team	Frontbench Team of Nick Clegg	2007–2010
Liberal Democrats (UK)	Liberal Democrat frontbench team	First Frontbench Team of Vince Cable	2007
Liberal Democrats (UK)	Liberal Democrat frontbench team	Frontbench Team of Tim Farron	2015–17
Liberal Democrats (UK)	Liberal Democrat frontbench team	Second Frontbench Team of Vince Cable	2017–19
Liberal Democrats (UK)	Liberal Democrat frontbench team	Frontbench Team of Jo Swinson	2019
Liberal Democrats (UK)	Liberal Democrat frontbench team	Frontbench Team of Ed Davey	2020–present
Labour Party		Opposition frontbench of Ed Miliband	2010–2015
Labour Party		Opposition frontbench of Jeremy Corbyn	2015–2020
Labour Party		Opposition frontbench of Keir Starmer	2020–2024
Conservative Party		Opposition frontbench of David Cameron	2005–2010
Conservative Party		Opposition frontbench of Rishi Sunak	2024
Conservative Party		Opposition frontbench of Kemi Badenoch	2024–present
Scottish National Party	Scottish National Party frontbench team	Frontbench Team of Angus Robertson	2015–2017
Scottish National Party	Scottish National Party frontbench team	Frontbench Team of Ian Blackford	2017–2022
Scottish National Party	Scottish National Party frontbench team	Frontbench Team of Stephen Flynn	2022–2026
Change UK	Change UK Frontbench team		2019
Reform UK	Frontbench team of Nigel Farage		2026–present

== Ireland ==
- Frontbench team of Pat Rabbitte
- Frontbench team of Eamon Gilmore
- Frontbench team of Enda Kenny
- Frontbench team of Gerry Adams

== See also ==
- British Government frontbench
- Official Opposition frontbench
- Opposition Shadow Cabinets of the Scottish Parliament
- Shadow cabinet
