= List of British shadow cabinets =

This is a list of the shadow cabinets of the United Kingdom, including unofficial frontbench teams of spokespeople from other parties from 1964 to the present date.

== Shadow Cabinets ==
Party key	Conservative
Party key	Labour Party
Party key	Liberal Party
Party key	Social Democratic Party
Party key	Liberal Democrat
Party key	Scottish National Party
Party key	Democratic Unionist Party

=== 1964–present ===
Date	Leader of the Opposition	Official Shadow Cabinet	Government	Other opposition
1964	Alec Douglas-Home	Douglas-Home	Wilson I	Grimond Frontbench Team
1965	Edward Heath	Heath I	Wilson II	Grimond Frontbench Team
1970	Harold Wilson	Wilson II	Heath	Thorpe Frontbench Team
1974	Edward Heath	Heath II	Wilson III	Thorpe Frontbench Team
1974	Edward Heath	Heath II	Wilson IV	Thorpe Frontbench Team
1975	Margaret Thatcher	Thatcher	Callaghan	Thorpe Frontbench Team
1979	James Callaghan	Callaghan	Thatcher I	Steel Frontbench Team; Jenkins Frontbench Team
1980	Michael Foot	Foot	Thatcher I	Steel Frontbench Team; Jenkins Frontbench Team
1983	Neil Kinnock	Kinnock	Thatcher II	Steel Frontbench Team; Jenkins Frontbench Team
1987	Neil Kinnock	Kinnock	Thatcher III	Steel Frontbench Team; Jenkins Frontbench Team
1990	Neil Kinnock	Kinnock	Major I	Ashdown Frontbench Team
1992	John Smith	Smith	Major II	Ashdown Frontbench Team
May 1994	Margaret Beckett	Beckett	Major II	Ashdown Frontbench Team
Jul 1994	Tony Blair	Blair	Major II	Ashdown Frontbench Team
May 1997	John Major	Major	Blair I	Ashdown Frontbench Team
Jun 1997	William Hague	Hague	Blair I	Ashdown Frontbench Team
1999	William Hague	Hague	Blair I	Kennedy Frontbench Team
2001	Iain Duncan Smith	Duncan Smith	Blair II	Kennedy Frontbench Team
2003	Michael Howard	Howard	Blair II	Kennedy Frontbench Team
2005	David Cameron	Cameron	Blair III	Kennedy Frontbench Team
2006	David Cameron	Cameron	Blair III	Campbell Frontbench Team
Oct 2007	David Cameron	Cameron	Brown	First Cable Frontbench Team
Dec 2007	David Cameron	Cameron	Brown	Clegg Frontbench Team
May 2010	Harriet Harman	Harman I	Cameron I (Cons.–Lib Dem)	None
Sep 2010	Ed Miliband	Miliband	Cameron I (Cons.–Lib Dem)	None
May 2015	Harriet Harman	Harman II	Cameron II	Robertson Frontbench Team; Farron Frontbench Team
Sep 2015	Jeremy Corbyn	Corbyn	Cameron II	Robertson Frontbench Team; Farron Frontbench Team
2016	Jeremy Corbyn	Corbyn	May I	Robertson Frontbench Team; Farron Frontbench Team
2017	Jeremy Corbyn	Corbyn	May II	Blackford Frontbench Team; Farron Frontbench Team; Second Cable Frontbench Team; Swinson Frontbench Team
Jul 2019	Jeremy Corbyn	Corbyn	Johnson I	Blackford Frontbench Team; Farron Frontbench Team; Second Cable Frontbench Team; Swinson Frontbench Team
Dec 2019	Jeremy Corbyn	Corbyn	Johnson II	Blackford Frontbench Team; Flynn Frontbench Team; Davey Frontbench Team
2020	Keir Starmer	Starmer	Johnson II	Blackford Frontbench Team; Flynn Frontbench Team; Davey Frontbench Team
Sep 2022	Keir Starmer	Starmer	Truss	Blackford Frontbench Team; Flynn Frontbench Team; Davey Frontbench Team
Oct 2022	Keir Starmer	Starmer	Sunak	Blackford Frontbench Team; Flynn Frontbench Team; Davey Frontbench Team
Jul 2024	Rishi Sunak	Sunak	Starmer	Davey Frontbench Team; Flynn Frontbench Team; Doogan Frontbench Team; Farage Frontbench Team
Nov 2024	Kemi Badenoch	Badenoch	Starmer	Davey Frontbench Team; Flynn Frontbench Team; Doogan Frontbench Team; Farage Frontbench Team
Nov 2024	Kemi Badenoch	Badenoch	Burnham	Davey Frontbench Team; Flynn Frontbench Team; Doogan Frontbench Team; Farage Frontbench Team

== See also ==
- List of British governments
- Official Opposition of the United Kingdom
