= Frontbench Team of Rhun ap Iorwerth =

Plaid Cymru frontbench team in the Senedd (2023–2026)

- Frontbench Team of the Senedd
- June 2023–May 2026
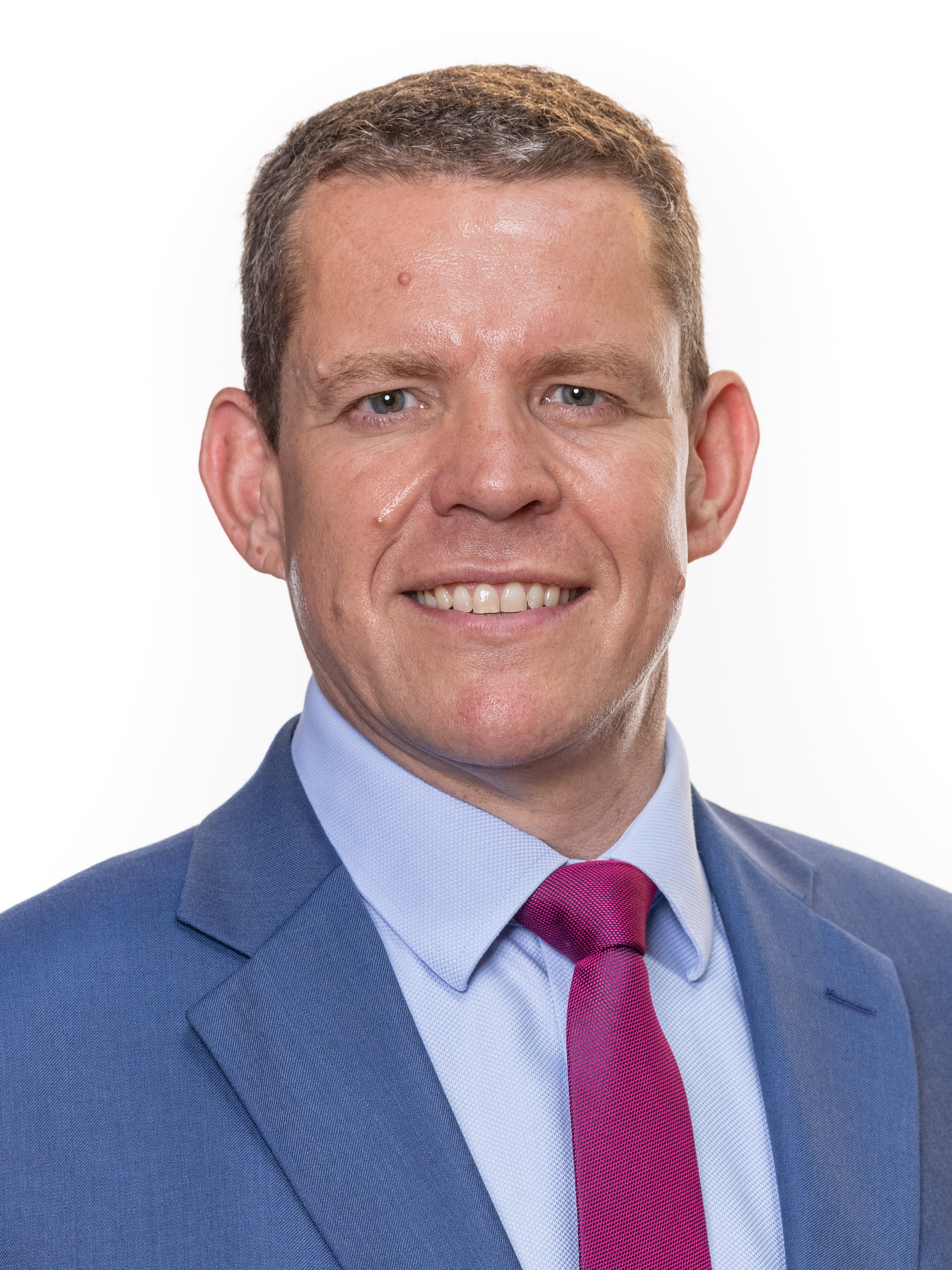
- ap Iorwerth's official portrait, 2021
- Date formed: 27 June 2023
- Date dissolved: 12 May 2026

People and organisations
- Leader: Rhun ap Iorwerth
- Deputy Leader: Delyth Jewell
- Member party: Plaid Cymru
- Status in legislature: Opposition party (Note: in co-operation with Welsh Labour government until May 2024)

History
- Legislature term: 6th Senedd
- Predecessor: Frontbench Team of Adam Price
- Successor: ap Iorwerth government

Rhun ap Iorwerth, the leader of Plaid Cymru, formed his frontbench team of party spokespeople in the Senedd on 27 June 2023 after he was elected unopposed to succeed Adam Price as party leader on 16 June. He reshuffled his frontbench team on 6 June 2024 to prepare for the 2026 Senedd election following the passage of a motion of no confidence in First Minister Vaughan Gething.

In the 2026 Senedd election, ap Iorwerth was elected as First Minister of Wales, leading the ap Iorwerth government.

== History ==
Rhun ap Iorwerth formed his frontbench team on 27 June 2023. Delyth Jewell was appointed the new spokesperson for climate change and deputy leader of Plaid Cymru. Heledd Fychan was given a prominent role as the Plaid Cymru Group's new business manager. She also became the spokesperson for education, Welsh language and culture. Outgoing acting leader Llyr Gruffydd returned to the chairmanship of the Plaid Cymru Group and also became the spokesperson for agriculture and rural affairs. Mabon ap Gwynfor became the group's chief whip and the spokesperson for health, social care and housing. Other appointments included Peredur Owen Griffiths as spokesperson for finance and local government, Adam Price as spokesperson for justice and European affairs, Sioned Williams as spokesperson for social justice and social services and Luke Fletcher as Spokesperson for the Economy.

On the formation of his frontbench team in June 2023, ap Iorwerth continued Plaid Cymru's co-operation agreement with Welsh Labour. As part of the agreement, he appointed members of the Plaid Cymru Group in the Senedd to serve as "designated members" who spoke on issues included in the agreement and co-ordinated with the First Minister and members of their government to implement its agreed policies. Under ap Iorwerth, Siân Gwenllian was the group's lead designated member while Cefin Campbell served simply as a designated member. In May 2024, ap Iorwerth terminated the co-operation agreement with Labour over concerns around the activities of First Minister Vaughan Gething and his government, who was found to have accepted a £200,000 donation from a company owned by a former convict for his Welsh Labour leadership campaign in March 2024 and sacked Hannah Blythyn from his government in May after she was accused of leaking private government text messages to the media.

The termination of Plaid's co-operation agreement with Labour left it with an effective minority in the Senedd and introduced the risk of a motion of no confidence in Gething's premiership. Later in May, the Welsh Conservatives tabled a non-biding motion of no confidence in Gething as first minister which was backed by Plaid Cymru and Welsh Liberal Democrat MS Jane Dodds. The motion was voted on in the Senedd on 5 June which Gething lost by two votes after two Labour MSs abstained. Following the confidence vote, ap Iorwerth reshuffled his frontbench team to prepare for the 2026 Senedd election, which must be held no later than 7 May 2026. He appointed himself as Plaid's new constitution and international affairs spokesperson. Other changes included the addition of transport to Peredur Owen Griffiths' portfolio in place of his previous responsibility for finance, which was given to Heledd Fychan in place of her education brief, which was given to Cefin Campbell. Siân Gwenllian became the new spokesperson for housing and planning and Sioned Williams' portfolio was reorganised into responsibility for social justice and early years. Adam Price also became Plaid Cymru's member of the Senedd Commission.

== Members ==
=== June 2023–June 2024 ===
| Portfolio | Spokesperson | Constituency | Term |
|---|---|---|---|
Party Spokespeople
| Leader of Plaid Cymru | Rhun ap Iorwerth MS | Ynys Môn | June 2023–May 2026 |
| Deputy Leader of Plaid Cymru; Spokesperson for Climate Change | Delyth Jewell MS | South Wales East | June 2023–May 2026 |
| Chair of the Plaid Cymru Group; Spokesperson for Agriculture and Rural Affairs | Llyr Gruffydd MS | North Wales | June 2023–May 2026 |
| Plaid Cymru Group Business Manager | Heledd Fychan AM | South Wales Central | June 2023–May 2026 |
| Spokesperson for Education, Welsh Language and Culture | Heledd Fychan AM | South Wales Central | June 2023–June 2024 |
| Plaid Cymru Group Chief Whip; Spokesperson for Health, Social Care and Housing | Mabon ap Gwynfor AM | Dwyfor Meirionnydd | June 2023–May 2026 |
| Spokesperson for Finance and Local Government | Peredur Owen Griffiths MS | South Wales East | June 2023–June 2024 |
| Spokesperson for Justice and European Affairs | Adam Price MS | Carmarthen East and Dinefwr | June 2023–May 2026 |
| Spokesperson for Social Justice and Social Services | Sioned Williams MS | South Wales West | June 2023–June 2024 |
| Spokesperson for the Economy | Luke Fletcher MS | South Wales West | June 2023–May 2026 |
Designated Members
| Lead Designated Member | Siân Gwenllian MS | Arfon | June 2023–May 2024 |
| Designated Member | Cefin Campbell MS | Mid and West Wales | June 2023–May 2024 |

=== June 2024–May 2026 ===
| Portfolio | Spokesperson | Constituency | Term |
|---|---|---|---|
| Leader of Plaid Cymru | Rhun ap Iorwerth MS | Ynys Môn | June 2023–May 2026 |
| Spokesperson for the Constitution and International Affairs | Rhun ap Iorwerth MS | Ynys Môn | June 2024–May 2026 |
| Deputy Leader of Plaid Cymru; Spokesperson for Climate Change | Delyth Jewell MS | South Wales East | June 2023–May 2026 |
| Chair of the Plaid Cymru Group; Spokesperson for Agriculture and Rural Affairs | Llyr Gruffydd MS | North Wales | June 2023–May 2026 |
| Plaid Cymru Group Business Manager | Heledd Fychan AM | South Wales Central | June 2023–May 2026 |
| Spokesperson for Finance, Welsh Language and Culture | Heledd Fychan AM | South Wales Central | June 2024–May 2026 |
| Plaid Cymru Group Chief Whip; Spokesperson for Health, Social Care and Housing | Mabon ap Gwynfor AM | Dwyfor Meirionnydd | June 2023–May 2026 |
| Spokesperson for Local Government and Transport | Peredur Owen Griffiths MS | South Wales East | June 2024–May 2026 |
| Spokesperson for Justice and European Affairs | Adam Price MS | Carmarthen East and Dinefwr | June 2023–May 2026 |
| Plaid Cymru Senedd Commissioner | Adam Price MS | Carmarthen East and Dinefwr | June 2024–May 2026 |
| Spokesperson for Social Justice and Early Years | Sioned Williams MS | South Wales West | June 2024–May 2026 |
| Spokesperson for the Economy | Luke Fletcher MS | South Wales West | June 2023–May 2026 |
| Spokesperson for Housing and Planning | Siân Gwenllian MS | Arfon | June 2024–May 2026 |
| Spokesperson for Education | Cefin Campbell MS | Mid and West Wales | June 2024–May 2026 |

== See also ==
- 2021 Welsh Labour–Plaid Cymru agreement
- Second Drakeford government
- Gething government
