= Delyth Jewell =

Welsh politician (born 1987 or 1988)

Delyth Jewell MS
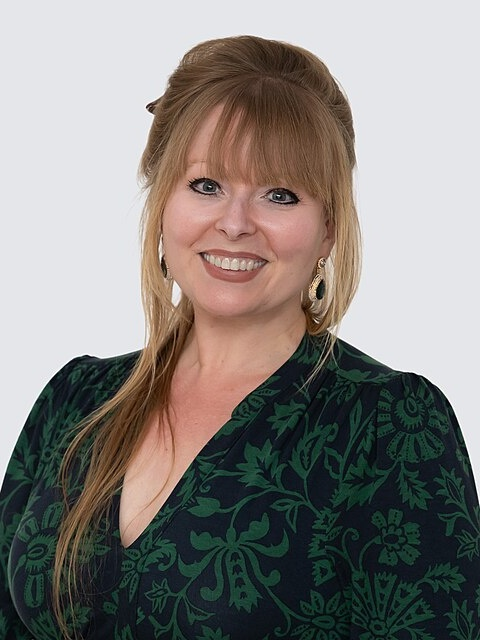
- Official portrait, 2026

Deputy Minister for Social Care, Mental Health and Women's Health
- Incumbent
- Assumed office 13 May 2026
- First Minister: Rhun ap Iorwerth
- Preceded by: Dawn Bowden
Plaid Cymru portfolios
2020–2021	Public Transformation and the Future; Local Government Association Coordinator
2023–2024	Climate Change, Energy, and Transport
2023–2026	Deputy Leader in the Senedd
2024–2026	Climate Change

Member of the Senedd
- Incumbent
- Assumed office 8 February 2019
- Preceded by: Steffan Lewis
- Constituency: Blaenau Gwent Caerffili Rhymni (since 2026); South Wales East (until 2026)

Personal details
- Born: Delyth Non Jewell; 1987 or 1988 (age 38–39) Caerphilly, Caerphilly County Borough, Wales
- Party: Plaid Cymru
- Education: Ysgol Gyfun Cwm Rhymni; University of Oxford (BA, M.St.)

Delyth Non Jewell (born 1987 or 1988) is a Welsh politician who has served as Deputy Minister for Social Care, Mental Health and Women's Health since 2026. A member of Plaid Cymru, she has served as a member of the Senedd (MS) since 2019, representing Blaenau Gwent Caerffili Rhymni, and until 2026, South Wales East.

Born in Caerphilly and raised in Ystrad Mynach, Jewell studied at the University of Oxford, graduating with degrees in English and Celtic studies and serving as president of the Dafydd ap Gwilym Society. She worked as a researcher and speechwriter for Plaid members of Parliament in the House of Commons, and later as a women's rights and international development campaigner for Citizens Advice.

Jewell unsuccessfully contested for the South Wales East electoral region in the 2016 National Assembly election. She was later sworn in as an assembly member in 2019, following the death of the elected Plaid candidate Steffan Lewis. Re-elected as an MS in the 2021 election, she held several positions on the Plaid frontbench team, including deputy leader of the party group in the Senedd. Following Plaid Cymru's victory in the 2026 election, Jewell was appointed into the ap Iorwerth government as Deputy Minister for Social Care, Mental Health and Women's Health.

== Early life and career ==
Delyth Non Jewell was born in 1987 or 1988 at the Caerphilly District Miners Hospital in Caerphilly and was raised in Ystrad Mynach. Her father was a campaigner for Plaid Cymru during the 1968 Caerphilly by-election, and she has said he influenced her political views. She had accompanied him to the funerals of former Assembly Member (AM) Phil Williams and former Member of Parliament (MP) Gwynfor Evans in 2003 and 2005 respectively.

She attended Ysgol Gyfun Cwm Rhymni and later studied at the University of Oxford, where she graduated with a Bachelor of Arts (BA) in English at St Hugh's College and a Master of Studies (M.St.) in Celtic studies at Jesus College. She served as the president of the Dafydd ap Gwilym Society, the Welsh language society at the university, in 2007.

Following graduation, Jewell worked for five and a half years as a researcher and speechwriter for the Plaid Cymru MPs in the House of Commons, including Elfyn Llwyd. In 2014, she received the Dods Overall Parliamentary Researcher of the Year Award, recognizing her work focusing on stalking and domestic violence legislation. In 2015, Jewell returned to Wales and worked for Citizens Advice, before becoming a women's rights and international development campaigner at ActionAid. In January 2019, Jewell published an article in The Independent on her research of abuse toward women politicians.

== Political career ==
In the 2016 National Assembly for Wales election, Jewell stood as a Plaid candidate for the South Wales East electoral region, and was not elected. She was placed second on Plaid Cymru's list of candidates for the constituency.

=== Member of the Senedd (2019–present) ===
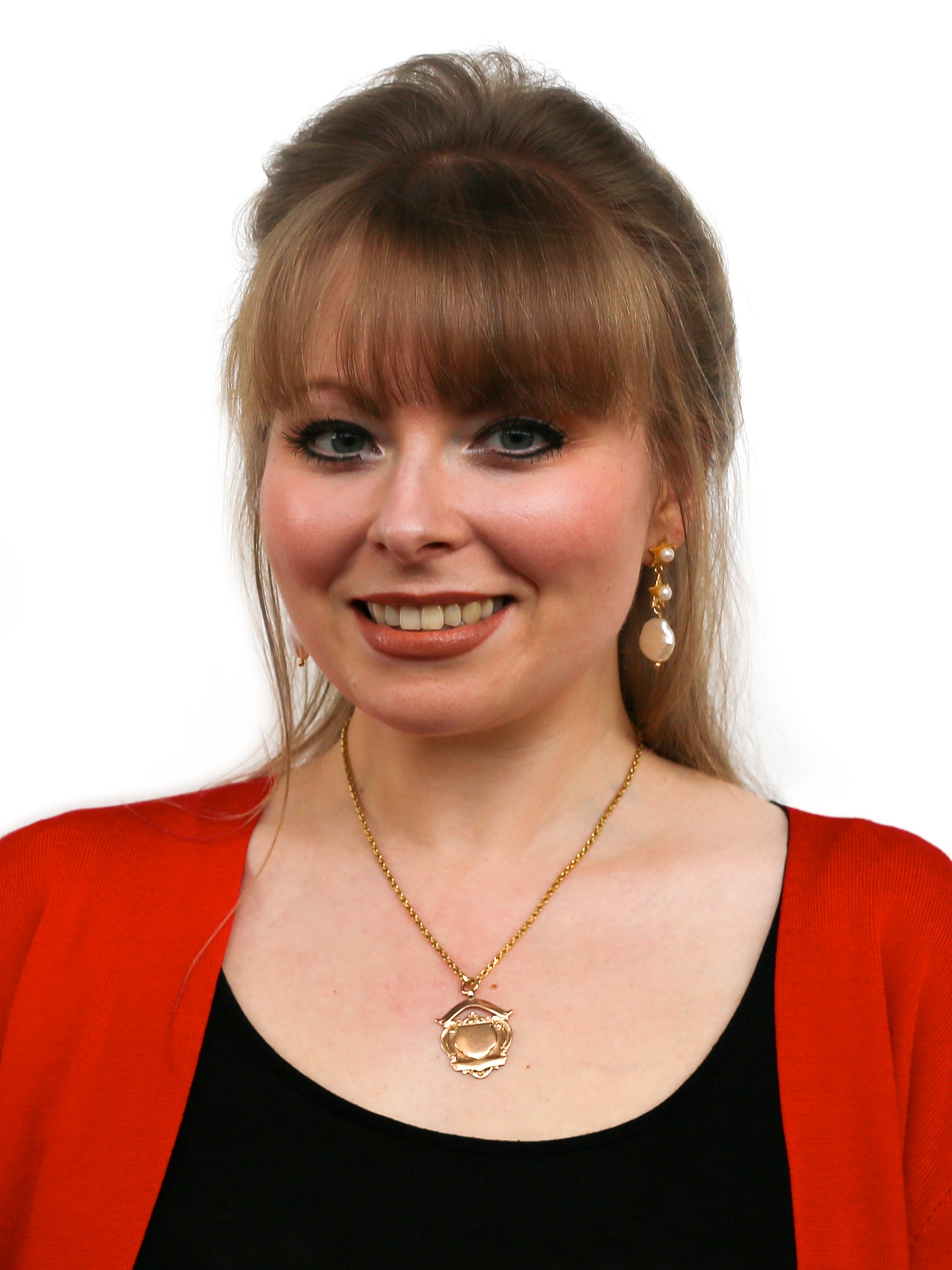
Official portrait as an assembly member, 2019

In January 2019, Jewell was confirmed as the successor of Steffan Lewis, Plaid Assembly Member (AM) for South Wales East, following his death from bowel cancer. On 8 February, she was sworn into office, and on 12 February, she gave her maiden speech, in which she paid tribute to Lewis. In a 2020 reshuffle of the Plaid frontbench team ahead of the 2021 Senedd election, Jewell was appointed as spokesperson for public transformation and the future, and Local Government Association coordinator, by Plaid leader Adam Price.

In the 2021 Senedd election, Jewell was re-elected as a Member of the Senedd (MS) for South Wales East. She had also been selected as the Plaid candidate for Caerphilly, and was not elected, receiving 8,211 votes (28.4%). She came second, defeated by Labour candidate Hefin David. Following the 2021 election, she was re-appointed to the frontbench team as spokesperson for climate change, energy, and transport. She served as the chair of the Senedd Culture, Communications, Welsh Language, Sport, and International Relations.

On 27 June 2023, following the election of Rhun ap Iorwerth as Plaid leader, Jewell was appointed into the frontbench team as deputy leader of Plaid Cymru in the Senedd. In April 2024 during First Minister's Questions, Jewell questioned First Minister Vaughan Gething on culture funding and offered Gething a yellow rose, quoting James Oppenheim's poem "Bread and Roses". The flower was declined by Gething, who acknowledged the point. In a June 2024 reshuffle of the frontbench team ahead of the 2026 Senedd election, the responsibility of energy and transport was transferred to Luke Fletcher and Peredur Owen Griffiths respectively.

In the 2026 Senedd election, Jewell was elected as a Member of the Senedd (MS) for the six-member Blaenau Gwent Caerffili Rhymni constituency, with Plaid Cymru receiving 29,314 votes (42%). She was the party's lead candidate for the constituency.

=== Deputy Minister (2026–present) ===
Jewell (second from the left) among the ap Iorwerth government on 13 May 2026

Following the 2026 election on 7 May, Plaid Cymru became the largest party in the Senedd and Plaid leader Rhun ap Iorwerth was nominated as First Minister of Wales, ending the Welsh Labour's uninterrupted tenure in Welsh Government since devolution in 1999. On 13 May, Jewell was appointed by ap Iorwerth into the Plaid minority government as Deputy Minister for Social Care, Mental Health and Women's Health.

In July 2026, Jewell said ministers would proceed with proposals for a National Care Service for Wales, and that support for neurodivergent people and people with learning disabilities would be improved through a focus on community-based services. In August, Jewell spoke at the Pembrokeshire National Eisteddfod and stated that the proposed service for Wales would not be established until the next Senedd term.

== Electoral history ==
Election	Seat	Party	Votes	Percentage (%)	Result	Source
National Assembly for Wales, 2016	South Wales East	Plaid Cymru	29,626	15.3	Not elected	
Senedd, 2021	Caerphilly	Plaid Cymru	8,211	28.4	Not elected	
Senedd, 2021	South Wales East	Plaid Cymru	30,530	14.7	Elected	
Senedd, 2026	Blaenau Gwent Caerffili Rhymni	Plaid Cymru	36,136	41	Elected	

== See also ==
  - 7th
  - 6th
  - 5th Senedd
- List of Plaid Cymru MSs
- List of female members of the Senedd

Political offices
Preceded by Dawn Bowden	Deputy Minister for Social Care, Mental Health and Women's Health; 2026–present	Incumbent
