= Yanukovych Government =

Yanukovych Government may refer to these cabinets of Ukraine headed by Viktor Yanukovych as Prime Minister:

- First Yanukovych government, November 2002 to January 2005
- Second Yanukovych government, August 2006 to December 2007

== See also ==
- Yanukovych shadow government, shadow cabinet during the second Tymoshenko government, December 2007 to March 2010
