= J. E. Meredith =

Welsh Presbyterian minister and writer

- Born: John Ellis Meredith; 7 August 1904; Denbigh
- Died: 16 April 1981 (aged 76); Aberystwyth
- Education: University College of North Wales; Jesus College, Oxford
- Spouse: Elizabeth Jones (m. 1931)
- Children: 4

6th President of the National Union of Students
- In office 1926–1927
- Preceded by: W J Langford
- Succeeded by: Frank Ongley Darvall

Religious life
- Religion: Christianity
- Denomination: Presbyterian
- Ordination: 1931

John Ellis Meredith (1904–1981) was a Welsh Presbyterian minister and writer. He was the first Welshman to become president of the National Union of Students.

== Early life and education ==
John was born on 7 August 1904 in Denbigh, the son of James and Margaret Meredith. James Meredith was a railwayman and an elder at Cricor Chapel, Pentrecelyn. James' job led to the family moving to Padeswood, Flintshire when John was aged 4. John was then educated in Buckley primary school and Mold's Alun County school. The family moved again after the First World War to Gwyddelwern where John's father became station master. John attended Tandomen County School, Bala before studying at University College of North Wales in Bangor. Here J.E. Meredith became president of the Students' Union 1925-6 and the following year became the first Welshman to become president of the National Union of Students. In the latter role, he met such figures as Bertrand Russell, Lord Beveridge, Lady Nancy Astor and, on a delegation abroad to Italy in 1928, Pope Pius XI, from whom he received his blessing. He also conversed with the Dictator Mussolini on the same trip.

J.E. Meredith graduated Bangor University with a BA in philosophy in 1928 and went on to study theology at Jesus College, Oxford that year. He shared a room in Oxford with T. Rowland Hughes. At Oxford, J.E. Meredith was secretary of the Dafydd ap Gwilym Society. He graduated with a distinction in 1930 and was ordained in 1931.

== Career ==
Having been ordained, Meredith went to preach at Bethania, Presbyterian Church of Wales, Aberdare, a leading Presbyterian church at the time. In 1937, he became pastor of Tabernacl Chapel, Aberystwyth, where he preached in both Welsh and English until his retirement. He also gave lectures in pastoralia at the Theological College in Aberystwyth where he focused on the comforts of the Gospel. As Chaplain of the town hospital he dedicated time and care to the sick and was a generous financial donor to the hospital. In 1988, in the committee preparing a new translation of the Welsh bible, he represented the Presbyterian Church. In 1970-1, he was Moderator of the General Assembly of the Presbyterian Church in Wales.

In Aberystwyth, Meredith was a loyal member of the local Free Church Council and served as the Mayor's Chaplain six times. He was the Chairman of the local committee for the United Theological College and of the International Committee for the Urdd. From 1939 to 1981 he was on the Court of Governors of the University College of Wales. He also more involved in the provision of Religious Education in the Department of Education and the Department of Extra Mural Studies.

=== Literary and academic works ===
Though Meredith wrote a number of articles, he is most famous for his published study handbook Ffordd y Bywyd in 1937, and Hanes yr Apocrypha (‘The History of the Apocrypha’) in 1942, the only book in Welsh on the subject. Meredith also delivered the 1970 Davies Lecture on ‘Gwenallt, religious poet’ which was later published in 1974, having been extended into a book. He edited Credaf, a collection of essays written by the people of Aberystwyth on their Welsh Christian values, perhaps getting the name from Gwenallt's autobiographical essay of the same name. In 1962 he wrote a brief biography of Thomas Levi, his predecessor as Tabernacl Chapel, and contributed to a memorial volume on Gwilym Davies in 1972. J.E. Meredith also wrote lyric poetry as a pastime.

At the National Eisteddfod of Wales in Cardiff in 1938, Meredith was adjudicator for Chief Recitation Competition, a role which he performed in numerous other Eisteddfodau.

== Personal life ==
In 1931, J.E. Meredith married Elizabeth Jones whom he had known from his school in Bala. She had graduated from Liverpool University and taught in Liverpool and Southport. The couple had four children; John Wyn, Margaret Wyn, Ruth Wyn and David Wyn. Meredith remained good friends with T Rowland Hughes.

J.E. Meredith was a proud pacifist and Welsh nationalist; Meredith's son John Wyn was among the first five children enrolled in the first Welsh medium school in Wales, Ysgol Gymraeg Aberystwyth, upon its opening in 1939. Meredith's other children also attended this school and he became the school's chairman of governors. He also strongly opposed the suggestion of introducing a bar in Aberystwyth's Students' Union and campaigned to keep pubs closed on Sundays, frequently preaching on the need for temperance.

Meredith received golfing lessons from Dai Rees, at Aberdare Golf Club, though golfing did not prove to be a passion of his. Later in life he became a keen fisherman. He was also a keen member of the literary group, the Bedol Society, of which R. I. Aaron was a member. He was a regular radio broadcaster and was the first person to perform Saunders Lewis's radio play, Buchedd Garmon, on BBC Radio Wales, speak the character Emrys' famous lines that compare Wales to a vineyard.

J.E. Meredith moved to North Parade, Aberystwyth, upon his retirement in 1969. In 1977 he had a seizure which resulted in him spending the rest of his life in hospital, where he died suddenly on 16 April 1981 from heart failure. A plaque was erected in Aberystwyth in his memory by his son John Wyn.
