= St Bernadette Catholic Secondary School =

Location
- Fossedale Avenue; Bristol, BS14 9LS; England
- Coordinates: 51.415846°N 2.562422°W

Information
- Type: Voluntary aided secondary school
- Religious affiliation: Roman Catholic
- Established: 1958
- Local authority: Bristol City Council
- Department for Education URN: 109331 Tables
- Ofsted: Reports
- Head teacher: Ed Walker
- Gender: Mixed
- Age: 11 to 16
- Enrolment: 735
- Capacity: 750
- Publication: The Bernard
- Website: http://www.stberns.bristol.sch.uk/

St Bernadette Catholic Secondary School is a coeducational Catholic, voluntary aided secondary school in Whitchurch, a suburb in the south of Bristol, England. It is located next to St Bernadette Catholic Primary School and the local parish church.

== History ==
St Berns, as the school is colloquially known, was founded in 1958 and named after Saint Bernadette. It was the second new Catholic school established in Bristol after World War II. In 2009-10 it underwent renovation through the "Building Schools for the Future" programme.

== Academic achievement ==
St. Bernadette's is a specialist school for maths and ICT.

The school has improved its results between the period 2008 to 2011 and achieved its best ever GCSE scores in 2011, the table below shows the percentage of students hitting the key measure of 5 A*-C including English and Mathematics.

2008	2009	2010	2011
45%	50%	37%	60%

== Notable former pupils ==
- Dawn Bowden, Welsh Labour politician and Member of the Welsh Assembly for Merthyr Tydfil and Rhymney
- Claudia Fragapane, Olympic Gymnast
- Tommy Doherty, footballer
- Neil Palmer, Writer
- Bobby Hodges, Irish Dancer lead of Riverdance
