= Opposition frontbench of David Cameron =

The frontbench of Her Majesty's Loyal Opposition in the Parliament of the United Kingdom consists of the Shadow Cabinet and other shadow ministers of the political party currently serving as the Official Opposition. From 2005 to 2010, Her Majesty's Loyal Opposition was the Conservative Party, and the Leader of the Opposition was David Cameron.

== Shadow cabinet ==
More women were appointed to the frontbench.

== Junior ministers ==
In December 2005 the following junior roles were appointed:

- Shadow environment minister – Greg Barker
- Shadow childcare minister – Paul Goodman
- Shadow police reform minister – Nick Herbert
- Deputy chief whip in the House of Commons – Andrew Robathan
- Senior parliamentary and political adviser to David Cameron – Andrew Mackay
- Leader of the policy group on economic competitiveness – John Redwood
- Deputy party chairmen – Angela Browning, Bernard Jenkin
- Shadow Europe minister – Graham Brady
- Shadow communities and local government minister – Alistair Burt
- Chief whip in the House of Lords – Lord Cope of Berkeley
- Shadow attorney general – Dominic Grieve
- Shadow minister for women and equality – Eleanor Laing
- Parliamentary private secretary to David Cameron – Desmond Swayne

Boris Johnson returned to the frontbench as shadow minister for higher education, so he quit his role at The Spectator. Mike Penning was Shadow Health Minister. Michael Gove was appointed Shadow Housing Minister.

The rest of the frontbench consisted of:

- John Baron, shadow minister for health
- Tim Boswell, shadow minister for work and pensions (also parliamentary private secretary to the party chairman)
- Julian Brazier, shadow minister for transport
- Geoffrey Clifton-Brown, shadow minister for foreign affairs
- Jonathan Djanogly, shadow solicitor general (also shadow minister for trade and industry and assists the shadow secretary of state for constitutional affairs)
- Mark Field, shadow minister for culture
- Mark Francois, shadow minister, Treasury
- Edward Garnier, shadow minister for home affairs
- Damian Green, shadow minister for immigration
- Nick Gibb, shadow minister for schools
- Michael Gove, shadow minister for housing
- Stephen Hammond, shadow minister for transport
- Mark Harper, shadow minister for defence Charles Hendry, shadow minister for trade and industry
- Mark Hoban, shadow minister, Treasury
- Gerald Howarth, shadow minister for defence
- Jeremy Hunt, shadow minister for disabled people
- Jacqui Lait, shadow minister for London
- Julian Lewis, shadow minister for defence
- Tim Loughton, shadow minister for children
- Anne McIntosh, shadow minister for work and pensions
- Patrick Mercer, shadow minister for homeland security
- Maria Miller, shadow education minister
- Malcolm Moss, shadow minister for culture, media and sport
- Andrew Murrison, shadow minister for health
- James Paice, shadow minister for agriculture
- Eric Pickles, deputy chairman of the party (local government) and shadow minister for local government
- Mark Prisk, shadow minister for small businesses
- Hugh Robertson, shadow minister for sport and the Olympics
- Laurence Robertson, shadow minister for Northern Ireland
- David Ruffley, shadow minister for work and pensions
- Mark Simmonds, shadow minister for international development
- Keith Simpson, shadow minister for foreign affairs
- Robert Syms, shadow minister for local government
- Andrew Turner, shadow minister for charities
- Nigel Waterson, shadow minister for work and pensions
- Bill Wiggin, shadow minister for environment, food and rural affairs

=== Whips ===
- Henry Bellingham, whip
- Crispin Blunt, whip
- Simon Burns, whip
- Tobias Ellwood, whip
- David Evennett, whip
- Michael Fabricant, whip
- John Randall, assistant chief whip
- Andrew Rosindell, whip
- Andrew Selous, whip
- Angela Watkinson, whip

== Changes ==
In 2006, the shadow ministers for the Scottish Office were appointed for the two biggest cities in Scotland:

- David Mundell, Shadow Scottish Secretary, minister for Glasgow
- Lord Strathclyde, leader of the Conservatives in the House of Lords, minister for Edinburgh

Due many English cities not having any Conservative councillors or MPs, cities in England were given shadow ministers too:

- Minister for Birmingham – Andrew Mitchell
- Minister for Bristol – Liam Fox
- Minister for Coventry – Caroline Spelman
- Ministers for Leeds and Bradford – William Hague and Eric Pickles
- Minister for Liverpool – Chris Grayling
- Minister for Manchester – George Osborne
- Minister for Newcastle – Alan Duncan
- Minister for Wolverhampton – Francis Maude

In 2007, Patrick Mercer was sacked as Shadow Homeland Security Minister. In 2007, Graham Brady resigned as Shadow Europe Minister over party policy on grammar schools.

In July 2007, new MPs were promoted to the frontbench:

- Shadow Treasury Minister – Justine Greening
- Shadow Justice Minister – David Burrowes
- Shadow Scotland Minister – Ben Wallace
- Opposition Whip – Jeremy Wright

In January 2009, the following roles were appointed:

- Shadow minister for housing – Grant Shapps
- Shadow minister for community cohesion and social action – Sayeeda Warsi, Baroness Warsi
- Shadow secretary of state for innovation, universities and skills – David Willetts
- Chief whip in the House of Lords – Lady Anelay of St Johns (attending shadow cabinet)
- Shadow environment minister – Richard Benyon
- Shadow security minister – Crispin Blunt
- Shadow innovation, universities and skills minister – David Evennett
- Shadow communities and local government minister – Justine Greening
- Shadow Treasury minister – Greg Hands
- Shadow business minister – John Penrose
- Whip – Bill Wiggin
- Whip – Robert Wilson

== See also ==
- Opposition frontbench of Ed Miliband
- Opposition frontbench of Jeremy Corbyn
- Opposition frontbench of Keir Starmer
