= Serhiy Rybalka (politician) =

Ukrainian politician

- Сергій Рибалка
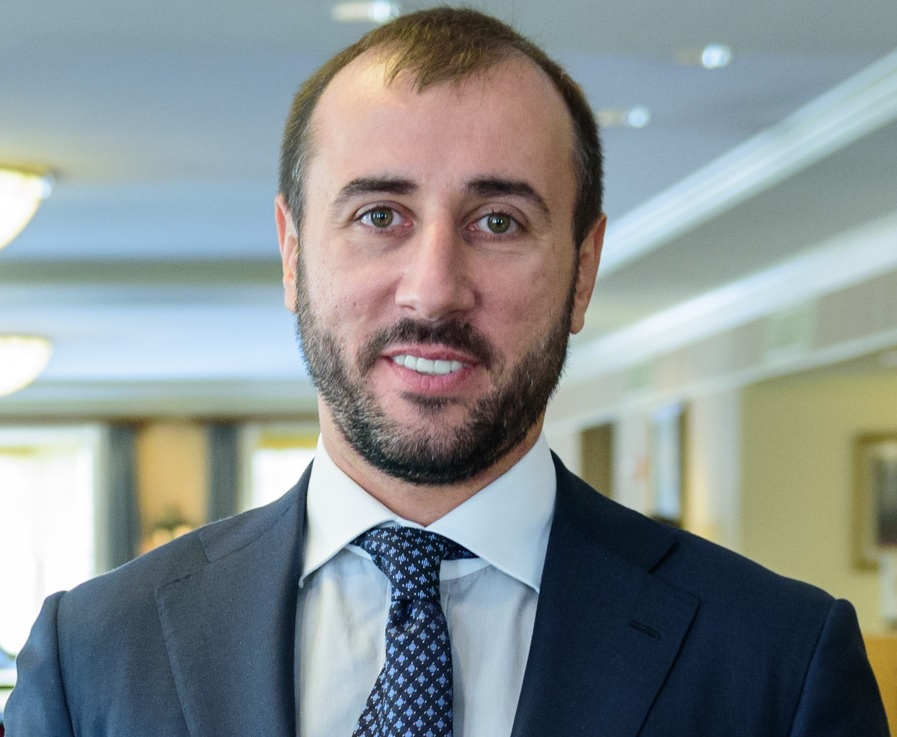

Member of the Verkhovna Rada
- In office 10 September 2014 – 29 July 2019

Personal details
- Born: 22 July 1978 (age 47) Dnipropetrovsk, Ukrainian SSR, Soviet Union
- Citizenship: Ukraine
- Party: Radical Party of Oleh Lyashko

Serhiy Victorovych Rybalka (Ukrainian: Сергій Вікторович Рибалка, aka Serhiy Rybalka, Sergey Rybalka) (born on 22 July 1978, Dnipropetrovsk) is a Ukrainian politician and a former member of parliament of Ukraine. He was a Chairman of the Committee of the Verkhovna Rada of Ukraine on financial policy and banking activity and former Deputy Minister of Ecology of Ukraine, former Deputy Head of the National Agency of Ukraine on preparation and holding of the final part of the 2012 European Football Championship. Member of groups of inter-parliamentary relations with parliaments of the United States of America, the United Arab Emirates, China, Austria, Kazakhstan, Georgia, Uzbekistan. Head of the Council of the National Professional Boxing League.

== Early life and family ==
Serhiy Rybalka was born on 22 July 1978, in Dnipropetrovsk, in the family of Victor and Yevheniia Rybalka. He started his first business in the mid-1990s. His brother Dmytro is now the head of the family business, Victor and Yevheniia are also involved in the company's management.

In 2000, he graduated from National Metallurgical Academy of Ukraine with a degree in Metallurgy of ferrous metals.

In 2003, he graduated from Law Academy of the Ministry of Internal Affairs of Ukraine with a degree in Jurisprudence.

In 2006, he married Hanna Butkevych, the daughter of Ukrainian tycoon Hennadii Butkevych, one of three co-owners of ATB-Market, the largest supermarket chain in Ukraine. In 2009, their daughter Roksolana was born. In 2013, Serhii and Hanna got divorced. This allegedly resulted in a business dispute between ATB and the companies of Rybalka's family and in criminal persecution by police and security service authorities. They continued and intensified after Serhii Rybalka was elected a member of parliament in 2014.

== Business ==
In 1995, as a student, he and his partner, Ivan Omelchenko, founded a private enterprise in the wholesale and retail trade sphere .

From 2001 to 2003, he worked as an engineer on occupational safety, the head of the occupational protection department for Kabliuk A.V. private company.

In 2000, Serhiy Rybalka and his partner, Ivan Omelchenko, set up "Snack Export" company that then became the leader in the snack market of Ukraine. The company is the owner of several brand names: "Semki", "Kozatska rozvaga", "Flint", "Macho" and "Morski".

From 2002 to January 2005, he acted as Director of Legal Affairs at Limited Liability Company "Markom".

In January 2005, he started to work as a Director of Legal Affairs at Limited Liability Company "Snack Export".

In July 2007, he became an Advisor to the Director General of Legal Affairs at Limited Liability Company "Snack Export". During this period, within the framework of "S.I. Group" other areas of business began to develop, such as transportation, development, distribution of goods, production of pulp and paper products.

After almost two-year break, he connected with work at the Ukrainian authorities. In March 2010, he returned to business and took the post of Advisor to the Director General of Legal Affairs in "S.I. Group" corporation.

From August to November 2014, Serhiy Rybalka worked as an Advisor to the Director General of Legal Affairs at the company "Snack Export".

In September 2014, as a result of political persecution and actions of his former father-in-law Hennadii Butkevych, "S.I. Group" was reorganized. Serhiy Rybalka and Ivan Omelchenko decided on splitting the corporation into two equal parts. The new company of Serhiy Rybalka was named "S. Group".

Since Serhii became a People's Deputy, the new group of companies is now run by his family under the name S. Group.

== Political career ==
In 2002 and 2006, he was elected a member of the Dnipropetrovsk City Council. He held position as a secretary of the standing commission on issues of legality, law enforcement, and security.

On 17 April 2008, by the order of the Government of Ukraine he was appointed as a Deputy Head of the National Agency of Ukraine on preparation and holding of the final part of the 2012 European Football Championship. At this position he was in charge of working with regions.

In January 2010, Serhiy Rybalka was appointed as a Deputy Minister of Environmental Protection of Ukraine with the Order of Government (Second Tymoshenko government).

At the extraordinary parliamentary elections, which took place on 26 October 2014, Serhiy Rybalka was elected as a deputy of the Parliament of Radical Party of Oleh Lyashko.

He was a former Head of the Committee on Financial Policy and Banking at the Parliament. As head of the committee, he initiated a number of draft laws in the field of investment, banking, and financial sector.

He was also a member of the groups on inter-parliamentary relations with the United States of America, the United Arab Emirates, China, Austria, Kazakhstan, Georgia, Uzbekistan.

(Rybalka's) Radical Party lost all its parliamentary seats in the 2019 Ukrainian parliamentary election, because it gained about 1% to little to clear the 5% election threshold and also did not win an electoral district seat. Rybalka itself took part in the election as an independent candidate in constituency 107 in Luhansk Oblast. Rybalka lost this election to Oleksandr Sukhov (who won with 28,96% of the votes).

== Activity in Financial Committee ==
Serhii Rybalka chaired VR Financial Policy and Banking Committee based on political quota of the Radical Party of Oleh Lyashko, which was a part of democratic coalition until the autumn 2015. After withdrawal of the faction from the coalition, all faction members that chaired parliamentary committees turned in their resignations. These resignations, however, were not considered by the Regulatory Committee and the Verkhovna Rada for two years.

As the chair of the financial policy and banking committee, Serhii Rybalka focused on the reforms in the banking sector. Specifically, under his leadership, a group of highly respected experts, employees of NBU, commercial banks, economists and scholars developed the Strategy of Banking Sector Development in Ukraine until 2020.

This was the first time, when the parliamentary committee initiated its own strategy for a whole industry. The document was approved at the meeting of the committee and recommended for the introduction to the parliament and the government of Ukraine.

The strategy provided an analysis of the operation of the National bank in relation to providing stability of the national currency – hryvnia for the first time (which is its constitutional obligation), withdrawing problem banks from the market (in 2014–2017, over 90 banks, which is half of all banking institutions in the country, were withdrawn from the market). In addition, it provided analysis of the factors suppressing financing of the economy, absence of export support and the role of state banks in the financial system of Ukraine.

The strategy proposed is to increase transparency of NBU's operation, introduce instruments to encourage development of hi-tech productions, activate financing, increase liability for violating banking laws, in particular bankrupting a bank. Rybalka and experts also proposed to create a number of development institutes on the basis of state banks to support not only big businesses, but also small and medium enterprises, improve domestic demand, support exporters and develop hi-tech branches of production.

With Serhii Rybalka as the chair of the committee, an open competition for the positions of members of the NBU Council, a supervisory constitutional body that controls how NBU exercises its authority, was introduced for the first time. Specifically, the committee reviewed programs of candidates from different political forces, before making a recommendation to the Verkhovna Rada on the candidates to be approved as the members of the NBU Council by the parliament's quota.

Also, in 2014–2017, Rybalka and VR Committee on Financial Policy and Banking drafted and introduced to the Verkhovna Rada a number of draft laws aimed at reforming the financial sector.

Specifically, these include draft laws on improving trust towards the banking system, on the deposit guarantee system for individuals, on supporting export, on minimum size of banks' capital, on credit register, on improving transparency of operation of the National Bank, on protection of rights of consumers of financial services, on stimulating financing in Ukraine. Implementation of a number of reforms, reflected in these draft laws, is a part of requirements of the International Monetary Fund within the package of the reforms that must be implemented in order to continue cooperation with Ukraine along with the demand to create anti-corruption court.

In addition, under Rybalka's leadership, the Committee initiated the development of draft laws regulating circulation of cryptocurrency in Ukraine. The draft law envisages the introduction of instruments of protection of unqualified investors and also preferential conditions for development of blockchain infrastructure.

However, the parliament's unwillingness to introduce financial reforms, including those initiated by the committee chaired by Rybalka, resulted into suspension of financial assistance to Ukraine from the international partners.

== Activity as a member of USA-Ukraine inter-parliamentary group ==
Serhii Rybalka as the Chair of the VR Committee on Financial Policy and Banking and a member of the USA-Ukraine inter-parliamentary group regularly pays working visits to Washington. In 2017, he met with a number of chairs of committees of the US Congress, held a number of meetings at the IMF, IRI, Heritage Foundation.

The issues discussed at the meetings included reforms progress in the sphere of finance and also law enforcement and judicial systems, U.S. experience in supporting small and medium enterprises as well as high level of political corruption in the contest of creating and organizing the work of the anti-corruption court.

== Persecution ==
Since 2013 his family's business and Rybalka himself have been persecuted, they claim for his political activity. Specifically, the media reported the first searches in January 2014. Later, the family's company was accused of tax evasion, drug trade, illegal surveillance, fraud and many other crimes, every time none of these accusations were proven in court.

Rybalka has claimed there have also been murder attempts against Rybalka and his close ally, S.Group top manager Serhiy Bilyy. One of the financial managers of the company Iryna Savytska is also being persecuted; in 2017 she was under arrest in Georgia on what she claimed were trumped-up charges of fraudulent actions. American media has written a lot about it.

In an interview for The Washington Times a former employee of Prosecutor General of Ukraine Dmytro Sus claimed that PGO employees falsified cases against Rybalka and company. Hennadii Butkevych could have been behind these falsified cases, said Sus.

In 2017 the National Anti-Corruption Bureau of Ukraine initiated a criminal proceedings regarding these facts.
