= Dafydd ap Gwilym Society =

Welsh student society of Oxford University

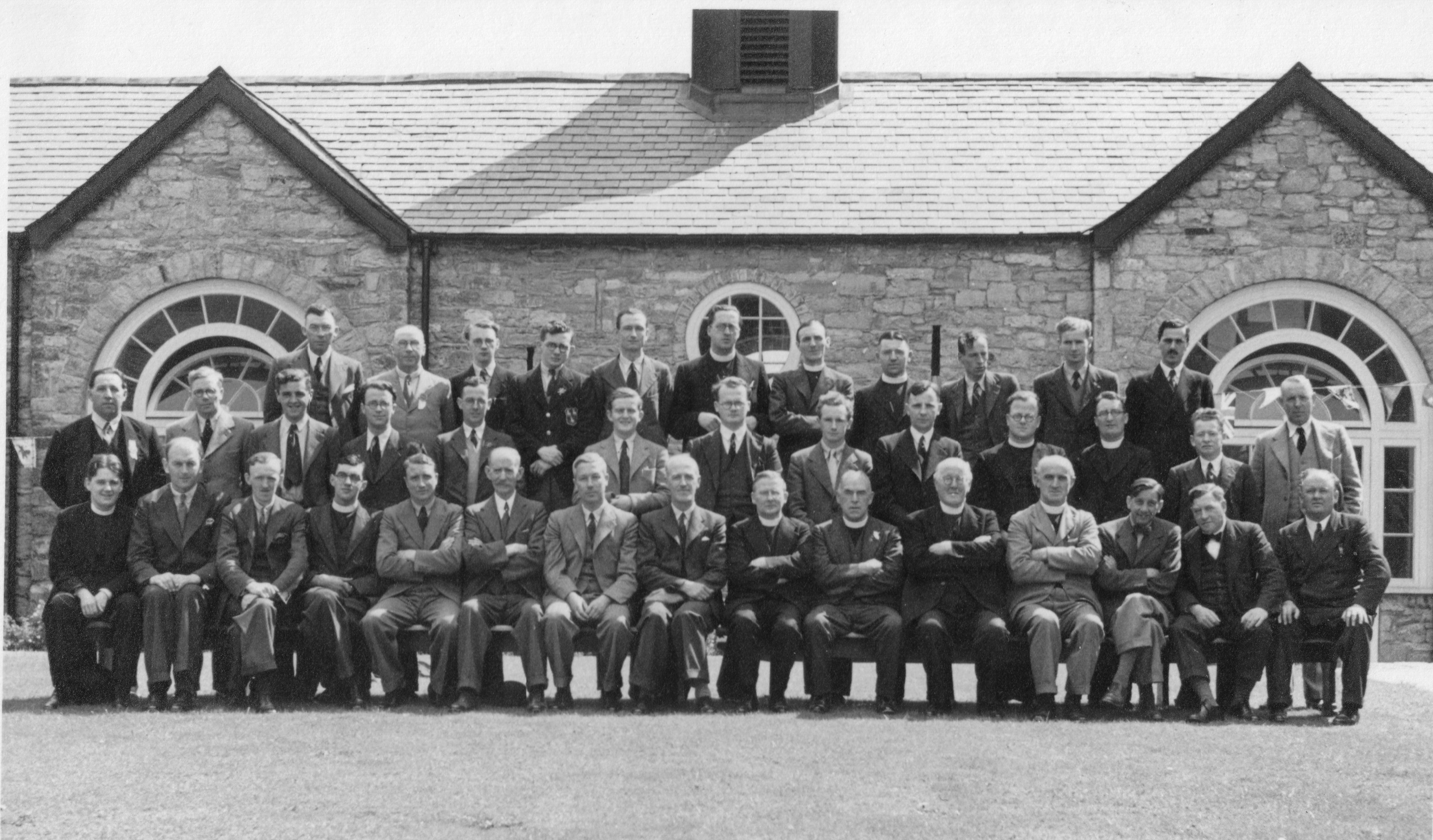
Dafydd ap Gwilym Society, National Eisteddfod, Denbigh 1939 Front row (left to right) G. O. Williams, T.I. Ellis, P. Macaulay Owen, Evan J. Jones, Hywel Davies, Jeremiah Williams, B. B. Thomas, J. Lloyd-Jones, T. J. Rowlands, G. A. Edwards, D. J. Lewis, C. Wynne Griffith, J. Williams-Hughes, Griffith Rees, T. J. Jones Second row (right to left): J. Edwards, R. H. Evans, D. J. Davies, J. H. Williams, R. I. Aaron, D. M. Jones, E. Pryce Jones, Dewi W. Powell, H. V. Morris-Jones, H. Williams, M. Elis-Williams, A. Tudno Williams, J. H. Griffith Back row (left to right): Llewelyn Jones, D. J. Williams, T. Meurig Wynne, H. Winter Jones, D. J. Samuel, E. Goronwy Owen, M. Hughes-Thomas, J. E. Davies, H. D. Lewis, G. R. Evans, I. Oswy Davies

The Dafydd ap Gwilym Society is the Welsh society at the University of Oxford. It is a Welsh language student society which is named after the Welsh poet Dafydd ap Gwilym and was founded in 1886. It is the second oldest student society in the university.

== History ==
Jones (1967) documented that in 1885 W. Llewelyn Williams 'was assisting in founding the Dafydd ap Gwilym Society at Oxford, with important consequences for the Welsh national movement.' The society, which was named after the poet Dafydd ap Gwilym, was founded in the following year by Williams and six other undergraduate students: Edward Anwyl, O.M. Edwards, T.E. Ellis, John Puleston Jones, John Morris-Jones and Daniel Lleufer Thomas. (Note: The society contrasts with Cymdeithas y Mabinogi (The Society of the Mabinogi) in Cambridge University, which is of Welsh students.) It is the second oldest student society in the university, the Oxford Union having been established in 1823. Löffler (2020) documented that in the year in which the society was founded it collaborated with Cymdeithas yr Iaith Gymraeg (The Welsh Language Society) in a resumption of its work to produce a standard Welsh orthography. (Note: Lloyd-Jones 1929 may be consulted about the work that both societies needed to undertake.) Morgan (1982) observed:

'The impact on Welsh life of so distinguished and closely-knit a coterie at the leading university in Britain was immense. The members of the Dafydd ap Gwilym felt themselves to be a cultural elite. Almost a hundred years later, Welsh students at Oxford (now of both sexes) who joined the Dafydd, preserving many of the rituals and customs of their Victorian predecessors, still felt membership of their society to be a badge of rare distinction.'

The society is informally known by its members as Y Dafydd (The Dafydd). It began accepting female members in the academic year 1966–1967. In the 1990s, several of the society's magazine editions (Yr Aradr), feature articles on the creative work of its members, as well as some of its guest speakers.

== Traditions ==
It was the tradition for every meeting of the society to begin with a reading of his work by the Chaplain, followed by discussion. Also the society had some formal rituals and prestigious-sounding positions. However, they were intended to be ironic. Today the chairman keeps the title of Chaplain, and the prestigious job of Headquarters remains. Traditionally members and alumni of the society meet annually at the National Eisteddfod.

== Constitution ==
It is not known whether there existed an original constitution for the society or, if so, whether it was lost. However the Co-Caplaniaid of Y Dafydd felt that a constitution was necessary for the continuance of the society. Consequently in 2025 an official constitution was drafted for it.

== Chaplains ==
Year	Caplan
2026/27	Charlie Evans (Jesus College) & Taryn Purchase (Jesus College)
2025/26	David Ingham (Jesus College) & Maia Williams (Jesus College)
2024/25	Ffion Wood (Hertford College) & Ethan Carmichael (St Hilda’s College)
2023/24	Alaw Owen (St Anne's College) & Eigra Williams (Jesus College)
2022/23	Efan Owen (Balliol College) & Manon Hammond (Lincoln College)
2021/22	Daniel Rolles (Jesus College)
2020/21	Carys Bill (St Anne's College)
2019/20	Adam Wilkinson-Hill (Jesus College)
2018/19	Osian Prys Elis (Jesus College)
2017/18	Lois Llywelyn Williams (Jesus College)
2016/17	Elin Havard (Jesus College)
2015/16	Llewelyn Rhys Hopwood (Jesus College)
2014/15	Benjamin Sadler (Jesus College)
2013/14	Cai Wilshaw (St Anne's College)
2012/13	Carwyn Graves (Worcester College)
2011/12	Laura Davies (Jesus College)
2010/11	Tomos David (Jesus College)
2009/10	Emrys Evans (New College)
2008/09	Dafydd Green (Pembroke College)
2007/08	Delyth Jewell (St. Hugh's College)
2006/07	Rhys ab Owen (Regent's Park College)
2005/06	Manon Mathias (Trinity College)

== Presidents ==
Some former fellows of the university who have served, or now serve as honorary presidents of the society:

- Sir John Rhys (1886–1919)
- Goronwy Edwards, (1919–1948)
- Sir Idris Foster, (1948–1978)
- Sir Robert Rees Davies, (1938-2005)
- Robert Evans
- Rosalind Temple
- David Willis

== Alumni ==
- O. M. Edwards, educationalist and writer
- Ifan ab Owen Edwards, founder of Urdd Gobaith Cymru
- Gwynfor Evans, politician
- Bruce Griffiths, lexicographer
- W. J. Gruffydd, scholar and politician
- Guto Harri, newsreader
- R. Tudur Jones, scholar
- D. Densil Morgan, theologian
- Rhodri Morgan, politician
- John Morris-Jones, writer
- Huw Thomas, politician
- D. J. Williams, writer and nationalist
- Gwilym Owen Williams, archbishop
- J. E. Meredith, writer and minister
- Ben Lake, politician
- Delyth Jewell, politician
- Rhys ab Owen, politician
