= Frontbencher =

Senior member of parliament

In many parliaments and other similar assemblies, seating is typically arranged in banks or rows, with members of parliament from each political party or caucus grouped together. The spokespeople for each group will often sit at the front of their group, and are then known as being on the frontbench (or front bench) and are described as frontbenchers. Those sitting behind them are known as backbenchers. Independent and minority parties sit to the side or on benches between the two sides, and are referred to as crossbenchers. Frontbenchers may be part of a Frontbench Team with other members of their political party.

== United Kingdom ==
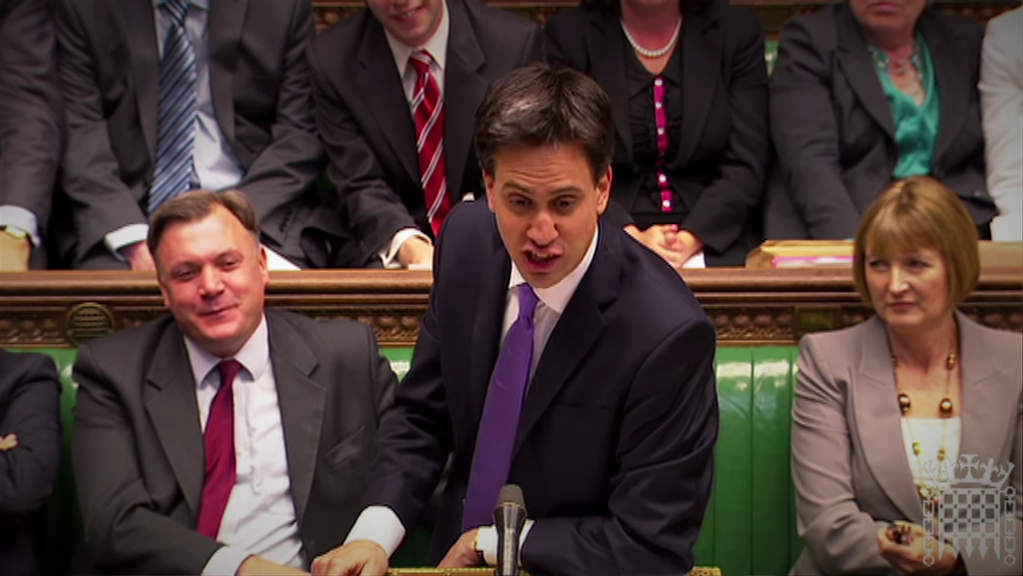
The Labour frontbench in 2012: Ed Miliband (Leader of the Opposition) flanked by Ed Balls (Shadow Chancellor) and Harriet Harman (Deputy Leader of the Opposition and Shadow Deputy Prime Minister)

In the House of Commons, the Government frontbench is traditionally called the Treasury bench (HM Treasury is the oldest government department). The government frontbench is on the right hand side as seen by the Chairman (typically the Speaker of the House of Commons or the Lord Speaker), and is occupied by Government ministers. The opposition frontbench is occupied by shadow ministers, of whom the most senior form the Shadow Cabinet.

== Canada ==
While backbenchers are referred to in the House of Commons of Canada (and the provincial legislatures), the front seats on the government side are reserved for cabinet ministers. Front row members of the governing party are not referred to as frontbenchers, but as cabinet ministers. Some "frontbenchers" actually sit in the centre of the second row, so as to be seen directly behind the party leader during Question Period (and thus, in the television frame).

The same arrangement exists for each provincial legislature and the territorial legislature of Yukon. In the case of Nunavut and Northwest Territories where there is consensus government with a non-partisan makeup, ministers sit amongst regular members.

== Ireland ==
A front bench in Dáil Éireann, the lower house of the Oireachtas of Ireland, refers to any organised group of party members who holds any degree of speaking power (derived from the party) on specific issues. The Teachtaí Dála (TDs) who are members of the Government of Ireland constitute the government front bench, while the members of parties in declared opposition to the government constitute the opposition front bench.

== Australia ==
The Parliament of Australia has a front bench, and all ministers and shadow ministers are government or opposition frontbenchers, respectively. The term is also used for state and territory governments.

In more recent times, journalists have casually referred to ministers as frontbenchers rather than expressing the due deference of their ministerial positions.

== New Zealand ==
New Zealand follows the Westminster tradition whereby the front benches, or in the New Zealand House of Representatives front seats, are reserved for the government and opposition leaders. The government ministers sit to the Speaker's right, whilst the opposition leaders sit to the Speaker's left (as seen from the Speaker's chair). The term frontbencher is therefore also used in New Zealand but usually refers to the foremost leaders and spokespersons of the Official Opposition rather than those on the government front benches.

== See also ==
- Backbencher
- Frontbench Team
