= Deputy Minister for Social Care, Mental Health and Women's Health =

Welsh Government minister

Deputy Minister for Social Care, Mental Health and Women's Health of Wales
- Dirprwy Weinidog dros Ofal Cymdeithasol, Iechyd Meddwl ac Iechyd Menywod

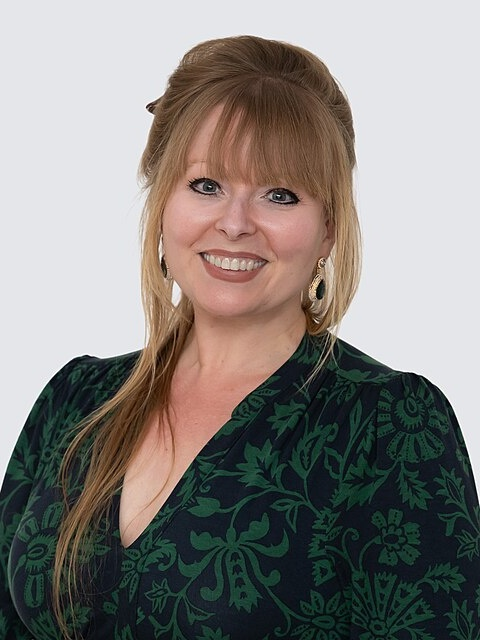
- Incumbent; Delyth Jewell MS since 13 May 2026
- Welsh Government
- Style: Welsh Deputy Minister
- Status: Deputy Minister
- Member of: Senedd; Cabinet
- Reports to: the Senedd, the First Minister of Wales and the Cabinet Secretary for Health and Social Care
- Seat: Cardiff
- Nominator: First Minister of Wales
- Appointer: The Crown
- Term length: Four years; Subject to elections to the Senedd which take place every four years
- First holder: Alun Pugh AM
- Salary: £101,443 (MS pay + £25,063 Deputy Minister pay)

The Deputy Minister for Social Care, Mental Health and Women's Health (Welsh: Y Gweinidog Plant a Gofal Cymdeithasol) is a minister of the Welsh Government, accountable to the cabinet Cabinet Minister for Health and Care. The current officeholder is Delyth Jewell since May 2026.

== Deputy ministers ==
Name	Picture	Entered office	Left office	Other offices held	Political party	Government	Notes
Deputy Secretary for Health and Social Services
Alun Pugh		23 February 2000	17 October 2000		Labour	Interim Rhodri Morgan administration	
Deputy Minister for Health and Social Care
John Griffiths		13 May 2003	2007		Labour	Second Rhodri Morgan government	
Deputy Minister for Health and Social Services
Gwenda Thomas		31 May 2007	19 July 2007		Labour	Third Rhodri Morgan government	
Deputy Minister for Social Services
Gwenda Thomas		19 July 2007	10 December 2009		Labour	Fourth Rhodri Morgan government	
Gwenda Thomas		10 December 2009	2011		Labour	First Jones government	
Deputy Minister for Children & Social Services
Gwenda Thomas		13 May 2011	11 September 2014		Labour	Second Jones government	
Minister for Social Services and Public Health
Rebecca Evans		19 May 2016	2017		Labour	Third Jones government	
Minister for Children and Social Care (2017–18) Minister for Children, Older People and Social Care (2018)
Huw Irranca-Davies		3 November 2017	2018	Older People brief added in May 2018.	Labour	Third Jones government	
Deputy Minister for Health and Social Services (2018–2021) Deputy Minister for Social Services (2021–2024)
Julie Morgan		13 December 2018	20 March 2024		Labour	First Drakeford government	
Julie Morgan		13 December 2018	20 March 2024		Labour	Second Drakeford government	
Minister for Social Care
Dawn Bowden		21 March 2024	11 September 2024		Labour	Gething government	
Dawn Bowden		21 March 2024	11 September 2024		Labour	Eluned Morgan government	
Minister for Children and Social Care
Dawn Bowden		11 September 2024	12 May 2026		Labour	Eluned Morgan government	
Deputy Minister for Social Care, Mental Health and Women's Health
Delyth Jewell		13 May 2026	Incumbent		Plaid Cymru	ap Iorwerth government	

== Responsibilities ==
The post's responsibilities are:

- Oversight of Social Care Wales
- Mental health services
- Women's Health Services and policy
- Suicide prevention
- Dementia
- Neurodiversity
- Learning disability
- Regulation of residential, domiciliary, adult placements, foster care, under 12s care provision and private healthcare
- Inspection of, and reporting on, the provision of social services by Local Authorities (via Care Inspectorate Wales), including joint reviews of social services and responding to reports
- Policy and oversight of the provision of all social service activities of Local Authorities in Wales, including the issue of statutory guidance
- Information sharing under the Children Act 2004
- Adoption and fostering services
- Cafcass Cymru
- Carers
- Safeguarding (in Social Services and health) and a cross-Government coordination and overarching safeguarding policy
- Older people

The post is accountable and deputy to the Cabinet Minister for Health and Care.

== See also ==
- Ministry
