= Ap Iorwerth government =

Government of Wales since 2026

ap Iorwerth Government
- 14th devolved government of Wales
- May 2026 – present
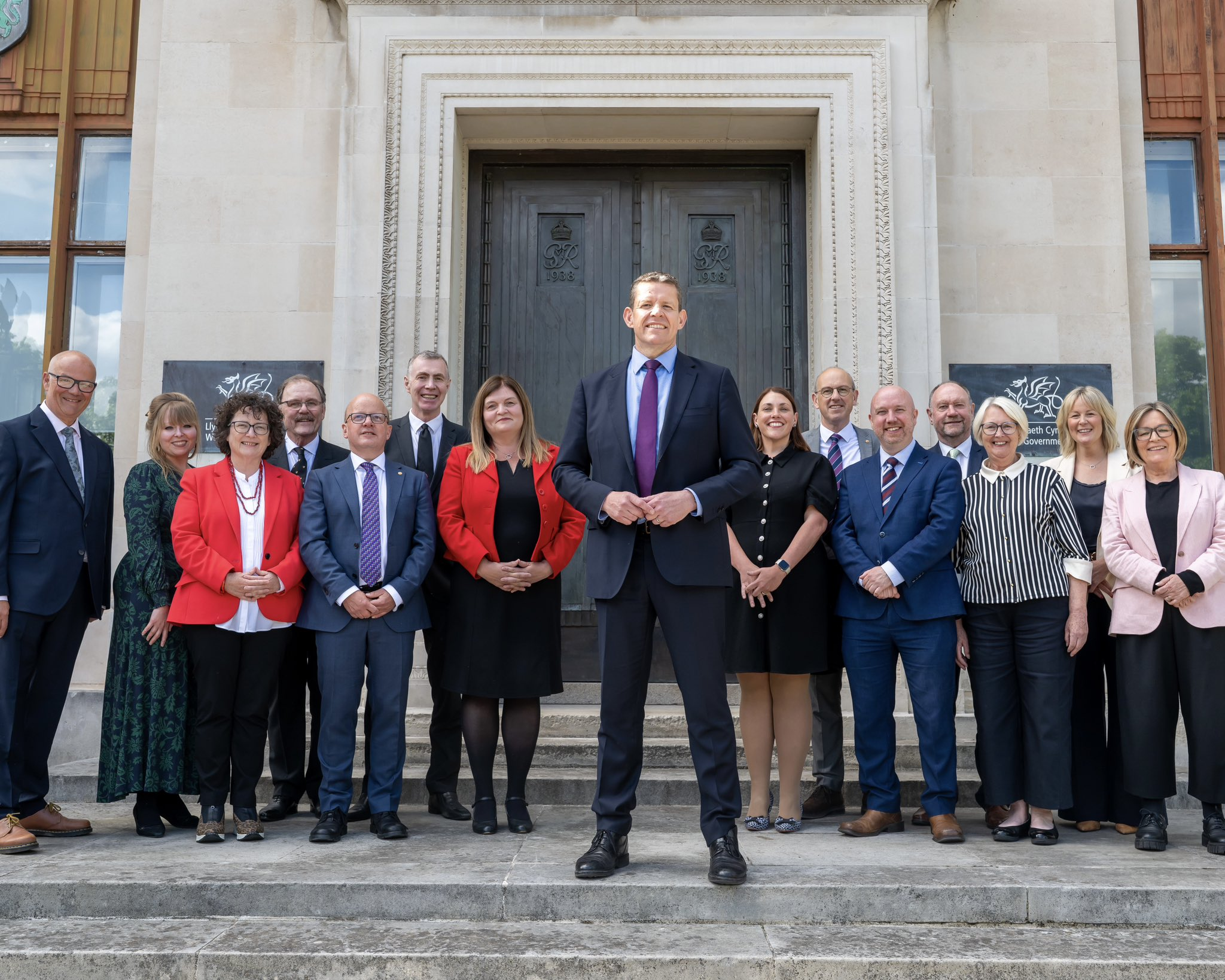
- ap Iorwerth's cabinet on 13 May 2026
- Date formed: 13 May 2026

People and organisations
- Monarch: Charles III
- First Minister: Rhun ap Iorwerth
- Deputy First Minister: Sioned Williams
- Member party: Plaid Cymru
- Status in legislature: Minority
- Opposition cabinet: Thomas shadow cabinet; Jenner shadow cabinet
- Opposition party: Reform UK Wales
- Opposition leader: Dan Thomas (2026); Helen Jenner (2026–)

History
- Election: 2026 Senedd election
- Legislature term: 7th Senedd
- Predecessor: Eluned Morgan government

The ap Iorwerth government is led by Rhun ap Iorwerth, who appointed members on 13 May 2026 following his nomination as first minister of Wales on 12 May 2026.

== History ==
From 2023 to 2026, Rhun ap Iorweth ran a frontbench team of shadow members, when Plaid Cymru was in opposition to the Labour government in the 6th Senedd.

=== Election ===
In January 2026, after opinion polls suggested that Plaid Cymru would win the most seats in the 2026 Senedd election, but not manage to win enough seats for a majority, Rhun ap Iorwerth stated that he would prefer to form a minority government than a coalition government. In the 2026 Senedd election on 7 May, ap Iorwerth was re-elected to the Senedd, with a seat in the newly formed Bangor Conwy Môn constituency. His party Plaid Cymru became the largest party in the Senedd with 43 seats; however, as the opinion polls predicted, they did not win the 49 seats needed for a majority. Ap Iorwerth confirmed that Plaid Cymru would seek to form a minority government, and that his party preferred a "cooperative approach" to a coalition. Ap Iorwerth was elected by the Senedd to succeed Eluned Morgan as First Minister of Wales on 12 May 2026. He was elected by 44 MSs: 42 members of his party Plaid Cymru (not including the non-voting Deputy Llywydd Kerry Ferguson) and the two members of the Green Party. All 34 Reform UK MSs voted for their Welsh leader Dan Thomas, and the 7 Conservative MSs voted for their leader Darren Millar, with Labour MSs and the sole Liberal Democrat MS Jane Dodds abstaining from the vote. Ap Iorwerth was officially sworn in as First Minister later the same day after 19:45 BST by High Court Justice Mary Stacey. He is the first First Minister to come from a party other than Welsh Labour.

12 May 2026 7th Senedd Election of First Minister
Senedd
Choice	Party	Votes
Rhun ap Iorwerth	Plaid Cymru	44 / 96
Dan Thomas	Reform UK Wales	34 / 96
Darren Millar	Welsh Conservatives	7 / 96
Abstained		9 / 96

=== Formation of Government ===
Rhun ap Iorwerth announced his cabinet on 13 May 2026. Many former frontbench members of his shadow cabinet were chosen as part of his top team. Elin Jones, the former Llywydd, was picked as Minister for Finance and has a key role in broking budget deals with other parties within the Senedd. In addition ap Iorwerth chose to include newly elected members to his cabinet and picked Elfyn Llwyd as someone from outside the Senedd. According to Nation.Cymru journalist Martin Shipton ap Iorwerth as a more 'centrist' FM wished to have a broad church of members within the cabinet and therefore chose Sioned Williams, seen on the left of the party, to be his deputy and to lead on the Social Justice and Equality brief.

== Members ==
Cabinet ministers

Portfolio	Name	Constituency	Party	Term
First Minister of Wales	Rhun ap Iorwerth MS	Bangor Conwy Môn	Plaid Cymru	May 2026 –
Deputy First Minister of Wales, Cabinet Minister for Social Justice and Equality	Sioned Williams MS	Brycheiniog Tawe Nedd	Plaid Cymru	May 2026 –
Cabinet Minister for Finance	Elin Jones MS	Ceredigion Penfro	Plaid Cymru	May 2026 –
Cabinet Minister for Government Effectiveness and the Constitution	Dafydd Trystan MS	Caerdydd Ffynnon Taf	Plaid Cymru	May 2026 –
Cabinet Minister for Local Government, Housing and Planning	Siân Gwenllian MS	Gwynedd Maldwyn	Plaid Cymru	May 2026 –
Cabinet Minister for Health and Care	Mabon ap Gwynfor MS	Gwynedd Maldwyn	Plaid Cymru	May 2026 –
Cabinet Minister for Enterprise, Connectivity and Energy	Adam Price MS	Sir Gaerfyrddin	Plaid Cymru	May 2026 –
Cabinet Minister for Rural Resilience and Sustainability	Llyr Gruffydd MS	Clwyd	Plaid Cymru	May 2026 –
Trefnydd (House Leader) and Chief Whip Cabinet Minister for Culture and Sport	Heledd Fychan MS	Pontypridd Cynon Merthyr	Plaid Cymru	May 2026 –
Cabinet Minister for Education and the Welsh Language	Anna Brychan MS	Caerdydd Penarth	Plaid Cymru	May 2026 –
Counsel General	Elfyn Llwyd	None	Plaid Cymru	May 2026 –

Deputy Ministers

Portfolio	Name	Constituency	Party	Term
Deputy Minister for Transport	Mark Hooper MS	Pen-y-bont Bro Morgannwg	Plaid Cymru	May 2026 –
Deputy Minister for Social Care, Mental Health and Women's Health	Delyth Jewell MS	Blaenau Gwent Caerffili Rhymni	Plaid Cymru	May 2026 –
Deputy Minister for Public and Preventative Health	Nerys Evans MS	Sir Gaerfyrddin	Plaid Cymru	May 2026 –
Deputy Minister for Skills and Tertiary Education	Cefin Campbell MS	Sir Gaerfyrddin	Plaid Cymru	May 2026 –
