= John Morris-Jones =

Welsh writer and academic (1864–1929)

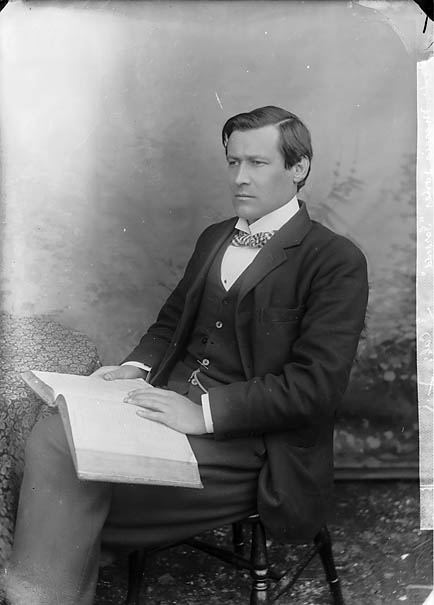
John Morris-Jones, photograph by John Thomas, c. 1885, when Morris-Jones was a student at Oxford

Sir John Morris-Jones (17 October 1864 – 16 April 1929) was a Welsh grammarian, academic and Welsh-language poet.

== Family and early life ==
Morris-Jones was born John Jones, at Trefor in the parish of Llandrygarn, Anglesey the son of Morris Jones, who was first a schoolmaster, then a shopkeeper, and his wife Elizabeth. He had a younger brother William Jones. In 1868 the family moved to Llanfairpwllgwyngyll where he received elementary education. In 1876 he entered Friars School, Bangor. In 1879 the headmaster of Friars School, Daniel Lewis Lloyd, was appointed to Christ College, Brecon, and John Jones accompanied him there. In 1883 he attended Jesus College, Oxford, where he graduated with honours in mathematics in 1887.

== Studies in Welsh literature ==
While at Oxford, Morris-Jones studied Welsh books and manuscripts in the Bodleian Library, and attended lectures by Sir John Rhys (1840–1915), the professor of Celtic. Morris-Jones and Rhys prepared an edition of The Elucidarium and other tracts in Welsh from Llyvyr agkyr Llandewivrevi A.D. 1346 (The Book of the Anchorite of Llanddewi Brefi), a collection of Medieval Welsh manuscripts in Jesus College Library, which they published in 1894.

Morris-Jones was one of the original members of Cymdeithas Dafydd ap Gwilym (the Dafydd ap Gwilym Society), which was founded in 1886 and is still a students' society.

== Academic career ==
In 1889 Morris-Jones was appointed as a lecturer in Welsh at the University College of North Wales, Bangor (now Bangor University) where he was promoted to professor in 1895, a post he held until his death.

Morris-Jones worked to standardise Welsh orthography. His works, Welsh Orthography (1893) and A Welsh Grammar, Historical and Comparative: phonology and accidence (1913), added to the status of the language and thus were well received in Wales. He was also founder and editor of the literary journal, Y Beirniad, published between 1911 and 1919. Morris-Jones was knighted in 1918, after which he used the surname Morris-Jones.

Morris-Jones was a commissioner of the Royal Commission on the Ancient and Historical Monuments of Wales from 1920.

== Translations ==
In addition to his own poetry, Morris-Jones published influential translations into Welsh of the German poet Heinrich Heine (1797–1856) and the Persian Omar Khayyam (1048–1131).

== Marriage and children ==
In 1897 Morris-Jones married Mary Hughes of Llanfairpwllgwyngyll. They had four daughters. He died in Bangor on 16 April 1929, aged 64.

== Legacy ==
The Welsh-speaking hall of residence at Bangor University is named Neuadd John Morris-Jones (John Morris-Jones Hall) in his honour.
