= Dawn Bowden =

British politician

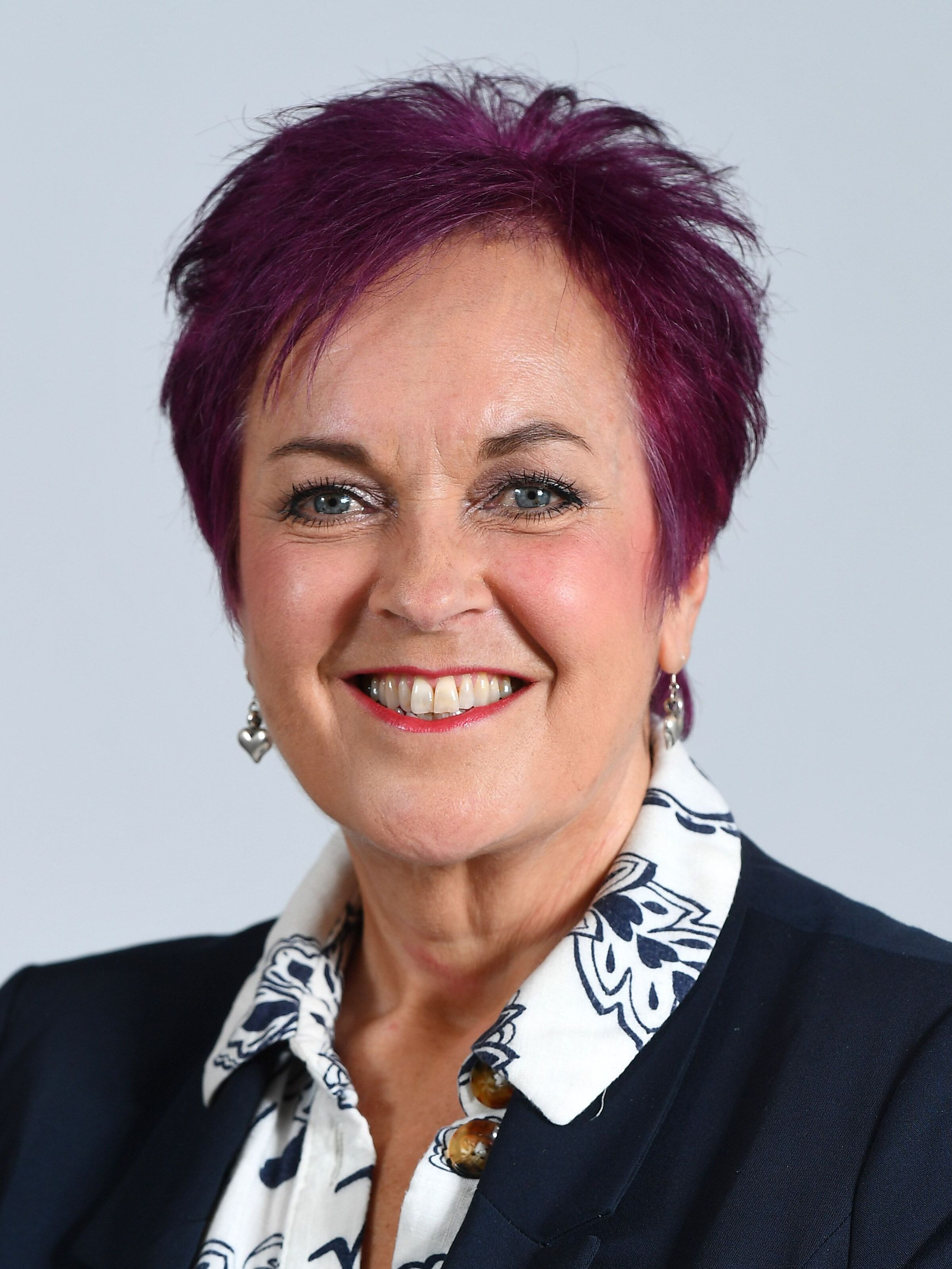
- Official portrait, 2024

Minister for Children and Social Care (Note: As Minister for Social Care from March to September 2024)
- In office 21 March 2024 – 12 May 2026
- First Minister: Vaughan Gething; Eluned Morgan
- Preceded by: Huw Irranca-Davies
- Succeeded by: Delyth Jewell

Deputy Minister for Arts, Sport and Tourism
- In office 13 May 2021 – 20 March 2024
- First Minister: Mark Drakeford
- Preceded by: The Lord Elis-Thomas
- Succeeded by: Office vacant

Welsh Government Chief Whip
- In office 13 May 2021 – 2 May 2023
- First Minister: Mark Drakeford
- Preceded by: Jane Hutt
- Succeeded by: Jane Hutt

Member of the Senedd for Merthyr Tydfil and Rhymney
- In office 6 May 2016 – 7 April 2026
- Preceded by: Huw Lewis
- Majority: 9,311 (44%)

Personal details
- Born: Dawn Alison Louise Bowden; 14 February 1960 (age 66) Bristol, England
- Party: Welsh Labour
- Spouse: Martin Eaglestone
- Children: Two
- Education: St Bernadette Catholic Secondary School; Soundwell Technical College

Dawn Alison Louise Bowden (born 14 February 1960) is a Welsh Labour Party politician and trade unionist who most recently served as Minister for Children and Social Care from 2024 to 2026. She previously served as Chief Whip of the Welsh Government from 2021 to 2023 and Deputy Minister for Arts and Sport (later also Tourism) from 2021 to 2024. Bowden was the final Member of the Senedd (MS) for Merthyr Tydfil and Rhymney from 2016 to 2026 before it was split between the new constituencies of Pontypridd Cynon Merthyr and Blaenau Gwent Caerffili Rhymni.

== Early life and education ==
Bowden was born on 14 February 1960 in Bristol, England. She was educated at St Bernadette Catholic Secondary School, a state-funded Catholic school in Bristol. Then, from 1976 to 1978, she undertook a secretarial course at Soundwell Technical College.

== Career ==
=== Early career ===
Bowden began her working life as a secretary. She worked for the National Health Service between 1979 and 1982, and for Bristol City Council from 1982 to 1983.

From April 2012 until her election to the Welsh Assembly in May 2016, Bowden was the head of health for UNISON Cymru/Wales (the Welsh division of the national trade union UNISON).

=== Political career ===
In February 2016, it was announced that Bowden had been selected from an all-women shortlist to be the Welsh Labour candidate for the Merthyr Tydfil and Rhymney constituency seat in the next Welsh Assembly election. The all-women shortlist was controversial; it drew criticism from a number of male councillors, including the leader of Merthyr Tydfil County Borough Council. On 5 May 2016, she was elected a Member of the Welsh Assembly with 9,763 votes (47.2% of votes cast).

Bowden sat as a Labour Co-operative member since her re-election in 2021. She was re-elected with a majority of 9,311 votes. After the election, she was appointed as Chief Whip for the Welsh Government and Deputy Minister for Arts, Sport and Tourism by First Minister Mark Drakeford. She was moved from the role of Chief Whip to being a Ministerial liaison for the co-operation agreement, in May 2023. After Vaughan Gething was elected First Minister in May 2024, she was appointed as Minister for Social Care. First Minister Eluned Morgan retained her in this role when she appointed her cabinet in August 2024, but renamed it to Minister for Children and Social Care in Morgan's September 2024 reshuffle.

In January 2025 Bowden announced she would be standing down at the 2026 Senedd election.

== Personal life ==
Bowden has two children. Sam and Jack. In 2011, she married Martin; he works as a policy officer for Welsh Labour.
