= Frontbench team of Enda Kenny =

- General: 2016; 2020; 2024
- Presidential: 2011; 2018; 2025
- Local: 2014; 2019; 2024
- European: 2014; 2019; 2024

These are the front benches of Enda Kenny from 2002 until 2011, before he became Taoiseach.

== Initial front bench ==
- Enda Kenny - Leader and Spokesperson on the North
- Richard Bruton - Deputy Leader and Spokesperson on Finance
- Bernard Durkan - Chief Whip
- Jim O'Keeffe - Spokesperson for Justice, Equality & Law Reform
- Dinny McGinley - Spokesperson for Defence
- Phil Hogan - Spokesperson on Enterprise, Trade & Employment
- Olwyn Enright - Spokesperson on Education & Science
- Bernard Allen - Spokesperson on Environment & Local Government
- Simon Coveney - Spokesperson on Communications, Marine & Natural Resources
- Billy Timmins - Spokesperson on Agriculture & Food
- Denis Naughten - Spokesperson on Transport
- Gay Mitchell - Spokesperson on Foreign Affairs
- Jimmy Deenihan - Spokesperson on Arts, Sport & Tourism
- Fergus O'Dowd - Spokesperson on Community, Rural & Gaeltacht Affairs
- Paul Connaughton - Spokesperson on Regional Development
- Michael Ring - Spokesperson on Social & Family Affairs
- Olivia Mitchell - Spokesperson on for Health & Children
- John Bruton - Spokesperson without portfolio

== 2004 reshuffle ==
- Enda Kenny - Leader and Spokesperson on the North
- Richard Bruton - Deputy Leader and Spokesperson on Finance
- Paul Kehoe - Chief Whip
- Jim O'Keeffe - Spokesperson on Justice & Law Reform
- Billy Timmins - Spokesperson on Defence
- Phil Hogan - Spokesperson on Enterprise, Trade & Employment
- Olwyn Enright - Spokesperson on Education & Science
- Fergus O'Dowd - Spokesperson on the Environment, Heritage & Local Government
- Bernard Durkan - Spokesperson on Communications & Natural Resources
- Denis Naughten - Spokesperson on Agriculture & Food
- Olivia Mitchell - Spokesperson on Transport
- John Perry - Spokesperson on Marine
- Bernard Allen - Spokesperson on Foreign Affairs
- Jimmy Deenihan - Spokesperson on Arts, Sport & Tourism
- Dinny McGinley - Spokesperson on Community, Rural & Gaeltacht Affairs
- Paul Connaughton - Spokesperson on Regional Development & Emigrant Affairs
- David Stanton - Spokesperson on Social, Family Affairs & Equality
- Liam Twomey - Spokesperson on Health & Children
- Michael Noonan - Spokesperson without portfolio

== 2007 reshuffle ==
- Enda Kenny - Leader and Spokesperson on the North
- Richard Bruton - Deputy Leader and Spokesperson on Finance
- Paul Kehoe - Chief Whip
- Charles Flanagan - Spokesperson on Justice & Law Reform
- Jimmy Deenihan - Spokesperson on Defence
- Leo Varadkar - Spokesperson on Enterprise, Trade & Innovation
- Brian Hayes - Spokesperson on Education & Skills
- Olwyn Enright - Spokesperson on Social Protection
- Phil Hogan - Spokesperson on Environment, Heritage & Local Government
- Simon Coveney - Spokesperson on Communications, Energy & Natural Resources
- Michael Creed - Spokesperson on Agriculture, Fisheries & Food
- Fergus O'Dowd - Spokesperson on Transport & Marine
- Billy Timmins - Spokesperson on Foreign Affairs
- Olivia Mitchell - Spokesperson on Tourism, Culture & Sport
- James Reilly - Spokesperson on Health
- Michael Ring - Spokesperson on Community, Equality & Gaeltacht Affairs
- Denis Naughten - Spokesperson on Immigration & Integration
- Alan Shatter - Spokesperson on Children
- Frances Fitzgerald - Seanad leader

== 2010 reshuffle ==
This was announced following the 2010 heave against Kenny's leadership.

- Enda Kenny - Leader
- James Reilly - Deputy Leader and Spokesperson on Health & Children, (with responsibility for policy coordination & implementation)
- Paul Kehoe - Chief Whip (with responsibility for political reform)
- Michael Noonan - Spokesperson on Finance
- Alan Shatter - Spokesperson on Justice & Law Reform
- David Stanton - Spokesperson on Defence
- Richard Bruton - Spokesperson on Enterprise, Jobs & Economic Planning (including public service reform)
- John Perry - Spokesperson on Small Business
- Fergus O'Dowd - Spokesperson on Education & Skills
- Deirdre Clune - Spokesperson on Innovation & Research
- Michael Ring - Spokesperson on Social Protection
- Phil Hogan - Spokesperson on Environment, Heritage & Local Government
- Leo Varadkar - Spokesperson on Communications & Natural Resources
- Andrew Doyle - Spokesperson on Agriculture, Fisheries & Food
- Simon Coveney - Spokesperson on Transport
- Seán Barrett - Spokesperson on Foreign Affairs
- Jimmy Deenihan - Spokesperson on Tourism, Culture & Sport
- Frank Feighan - Spokesperson on Community, Equality & Gaeltacht Affairs
- Catherine Byrne - Spokesperson on Older Citizens
- Charlie Flanagan - Spokesperson on Children

== See also ==
- Frontbench team of Eamon Gilmore
