= Opposition frontbench of Ed Miliband =

The frontbench of Her Majesty's Loyal Opposition in the Parliament of the United Kingdom consists of the Shadow Cabinet and other shadow ministers of the political party currently serving as the Official Opposition. From 2010 to 2015, Her Majesty's Loyal Opposition was the Labour Party, and the Leader of the Opposition was Ed Miliband.

Key

Member of the House of Commons
Member of the House of Lords
Shadow Cabinet full members **in bold**
Shadow Cabinet attendees **in bold italics**

== Leader's Office, Cabinet Office and Whips Office ==
Office of the Leader of the Opposition
Leader of Her Majesty's Most Loyal Opposition; Leader of the Labour Party	Ed Miliband	2010 – 2015
Deputy Leader of Her Majesty's Most Loyal Opposition; Deputy Leader of the Labour Party; Shadow Deputy Prime Minister of the United Kingdom; Chair of the Labour Party	Harriet Harman	2010 – 2015
Deputy Chair of the Labour Party	Tom Watson	2011–2013
Deputy Chair of the Labour Party	Jon Trickett	2013–2015
Parliamentary Private Secretary to the Leader of the Opposition	Karen Buck	2013 – 2015
Parliamentary Private Secretary to the Leader of the Opposition	Wayne David	2013 – 2015
Parliamentary Private Secretary to the Leader of the Opposition	John Denham	2011 – 2013
Parliamentary Private Secretary to the Leader of the Opposition	Anne McGuire	2010 – 2011
Cabinet Office
Shadow Minister for the Cabinet Office	Liam Byrne	2010–2011
Shadow Minister for the Cabinet Office	Tessa Jowell	2011–2011
Shadow Minister for the Cabinet Office	Jon Trickett	2011–2013
Shadow Minister for the Cabinet Office	Michael Dugher	2013–2014
Shadow Minister for the Cabinet Office	Jonathan Ashworth	2013–2015
Shadow Minister for the Cabinet Office	Lucy Powell	2014–2015
Shadow Spokesman in the House of Lords	Lord Hunt of Kings Heath	2010–2012
Whips' Office
Opposition Chief Whip in the House of Commons	Rosie Winterton	2010–2015
Shadow Chief Whip in the House of Lords	Lord Bassam of Brighton	2010–2015
Opposition Whip	Nic Dakin	2011–2015
Junior Whip	Heidi Alexander	2012–2013
Senior Whip	Heidi Alexander	2013–2015
House of Lords Whip	Baroness Sherlock	2013–2015
Junior Whip	Baroness Wheeler	2010–2014
Senior Whip	Baroness Wheeler	2014–2015
Parliament
Shadow Leader of the House of Commons	Hilary Benn	2010–2011
Shadow Leader of the House of Commons	Angela Eagle	2011–2015
Shadow Leader of the House of Lords	Baroness Royall of Blaisdon	2010–2015
Shadow Deputy Leader of the House of Lords	Lord Hunt of Kings Heath	2010–2015

== Treasury ==
HM Treasury
Shadow Chancellor of the Exchequer	Alan Johnson	2010–2011
Shadow Chancellor of the Exchequer	Ed Balls	2011–2015
Shadow Chief Secretary to the Treasury	Angela Eagle	2010–2011
Shadow Chief Secretary to the Treasury	Rachel Reeves	2011–2013
Shadow Chief Secretary to the Treasury	Chris Leslie	2013–2015
Shadow Economic Secretary to the Treasury	David Hanson	2010–2011
Shadow Economic Secretary to the Treasury	Cathy Jamieson	2011–2013
Shadow Economic Secretary to the Treasury	Catherine McKinnell	2013–2015
Shadow Financial Secretary to the Treasury	Chris Leslie	2010–2013
Shadow Financial Secretary to the Treasury	Shabana Mahmood	2013–2015

== Foreign Affairs and Defence ==
Foreign Office
Shadow Foreign Secretary	Yvette Cooper	2010–2011
Shadow Foreign Secretary	Douglas Alexander	2011–2015
Shadow Minister for Europe	Wayne David	2010–2011
Shadow Minister for Europe	Emma Reynolds	2011–2013
Shadow Minister for Europe	Gareth Thomas	2013–2014
Shadow Minister for Europe	Pat McFadden	2014–2015
Department for International Development
Shadow Secretary of State for International Development	Harriet Harman	2010–2011
Shadow Secretary of State for International Development	Ivan Lewis	2011–2013
Shadow Secretary of State for International Development	Jim Murphy	2013–2014
Shadow Secretary of State for International Development	Mary Creagh	2014–2015
Ministry of Defence
Shadow Secretary of State for Defence	Jim Murphy	2010–2013
Shadow Secretary of State for Defence	Vernon Coaker	2013–2015
Shadow Minister for Defence Personnel, Welfare and Veterans	Gemma Doyle	2010–2015

== Home Affairs ==
Home Office
Shadow Home Secretary	Ed Balls	2010–2011
Shadow Home Secretary	Yvette Cooper	2011–2015
Shadow Minister for Policing	Jack Dromey	2013–2015
Shadow Minister for Prisons	Jenny Chapman	2011–2015
Shadow Minister for Crime Prevention	Gloria De Piero	2011–2013
Shadow Minister for Home Affairs	Steve Reed	2013–2015
Shadow Minister for Immigration	Gerry Sutcliffe	2010–2011
Shadow Minister for Immigration	David Hanson	2011–2015
Shadow Spokesman in the House of Lords	Lord Hunt of Kings Heath	2012–2015
Ministry of Justice and Attorney General's Office
Shadow Secretary of State for Justice and Shadow Lord Chancellor	Sadiq Khan	2010–2015
Shadow Minister for Justice	Andy Slaughter	2010–2015
Shadow Attorney General	Baroness Scotland of Asthal	2010–2011
Shadow Attorney General	Emily Thornberry	2011–2014
Shadow Attorney General	Lord Bach	2014–2015
Shadow Solicitor General	Catherine McKinnell	2010–2011
Shadow Solicitor General	Karl Turner	2014–2015
Parliamentary Private Secretary to the Shadow Justice Secretary	Alex Cunningham	2010–2015

== Business ==
Department for Business, Innovation and Skills
Shadow Secretary of State for Business, Innovation and Skills	John Denham	2010–2011
Shadow Secretary of State for Business, Innovation and Skills	Chuka Umunna	2011–2015
Shadow Minister for Business, Innovation and Skills	Gordon Banks	2010 – 2011
Shadow Minister for Business, Innovation and Skills	Nia Griffith	2010 – 2011
Shadow Minister for Business, Innovation and Skills	Chuka Umunna	2011

== Education ==
Department for Education
Shadow Secretary of State for Education	Andy Burnham	2010–2011
Shadow Secretary of State for Education	Stephen Twigg	2011–2013
Shadow Secretary of State for Education	Tristram Hunt	2013–2015
Shadow Minister for Further Education	Iain Wright	2010 – 2011
Shadow Minister for Further Education	Karen Buck	2011 – 2013
Shadow Minister for Further Education	Tristram Hunt	2013
Shadow Minister for Further Education	Rushanara Ali	2013 – 2014
Shadow Minister for Children and Families	Sharon Hodgson	2010 – 2013
Shadow Minister for Children and Young Families	Lisa Nandy	2012 – 2013
Shadow Minister for Children and Families	Steve McCabe	2013–2015
Shadow Minister for Childcare and Early Years	Lucy Powell	2013 – 2014
Shadow Minister for Children and Families	Alison McGovern	2014 – 2015
Shadow Minister for Further Education, Skills and Regional Growth	Gordon Marsden	2010 – 2013

== Energy and Climate Change ==
Department of Energy and Climate Change
Shadow Secretary of State for Energy and Climate Change	Meg Hillier	2010–2011
Shadow Secretary of State for Energy and Climate Change	Caroline Flint	2011–2015
Shadow Minister for Energy	Huw Irranca-Davies	2010 – 2011
Shadow Minister for Energy	Tom Greatrex	2011 – 2015
Shadow Minister for Energy and Climate Change	Luciana Berger	2010 – 2013
Shadow Minister for Energy and Climate Change	Jonathan Reynolds	2013 – 2015

== Local government ==
Department for Communities and Local Government
Shadow Secretary of State for Communities and Local Government	Caroline Flint	2010–2011
Shadow Secretary of State for Communities and Local Government	Hilary Benn	2011–2015
Shadow Minister for Communities and Local Government	Barbara Keeley	2010–2011
Shadow Minister for Communities and Local Government	Roberta Blackman-Woods	2011–2015
Shadow Minister for Communities and Local Government	Lyn Brown	2013–2015
Shadow Minister for Housing	Jack Dromey	2010–2013
Shadow Minister for Communities and Local Government	Andy Sawford	2013–2015
Deputy Shadow Minister for London	Heidi Alexander	2013–2015
Shadow Spokesman in the House of Lords	Lord McKenzie of Luton	2010–2013

== DEFRA ==
Department for Environment, Food and Rural Affairs
Shadow Secretary of State for Environment, Food and Rural Affairs	Mary Creagh	2010–2013
Shadow Secretary of State for Environment, Food and Rural Affairs	Maria Eagle	2013–2015
Shadow Minister for Food	Willie Bain	2010 – 2011
Shadow Minister for Food and Farming	Huw Irranca-Davies	2011 – 2015
Shadow Minister for the Natural Environment and Fisheries	Jamie Reed	2010 – 2011
Shadow Minister for the Natural Environment and Fisheries	Fiona O'Donnell	2011 – 2012
Shadow Minister for the Natural Environment and Fisheries	Barry Gardiner	2013 – 2015
Shadow Minister for the Environment	Tom Harris	2012 – 2013
Parliamentary Private Secretary to the Shadow Environment, Food and Rural Affairs team	Heidi Alexander	2010 – 2012

== Health and social services ==
Department of Health
Shadow Secretary of State for Health	John Healey	2010–2011
Shadow Secretary of State for Health	Andy Burnham	2011–2015
Shadow Minister for Health	Derek Twigg	2010–2011
Shadow Minister for Health	Jamie Reed	2011–2015
Shadow Minister for Health	Andrew Gwynne	2011–2015
Shadow Minister for Social Care	Emily Thornberry	2010–2011
Shadow Minister for Social Care	Liz Kendall	2011–2015
Shadow Minister for Public Health	Diane Abbott	2010–2013
Shadow Minister for Public Health	Luciana Berger	2013–2015
Shadow Minister for Disabled People	Margaret Curran	2010–2011
Shadow Minister for Disabled People	Anne McGuire	2011–2013
Shadow Minister for Disabled People	Kate Green	2013 – 2015
Parliamentary Private Secretary to the Shadow Secretary of State for Health	Debbie Abrahams	2010–2015
Shadow Spokesman in the House of Lords	Baroness Thornton	2010–2012
Department for Work and Pensions
Shadow Secretary of State for Work and Pensions	Douglas Alexander	2010–2011
Shadow Secretary of State for Work and Pensions	Liam Byrne	2011–2013
Shadow Secretary of State for Work and Pensions	Rachel Reeves	2013–2015
Shadow Minister for Pensions	Rachel Reeves	2010–2011
Shadow Minister for Pensions	Gregg McClymont	2011–2015
Shadow Spokesman in the House of Lords	Baroness Sherlock	2013–2015
Shadow Spokesman in the House of Lords	Lord McKenzie of Luton	2010–2013

== Culture ==
Department for Culture, Media, and Sport
Shadow Secretary of State for Culture, Media and Sport	Ivan Lewis	2010–2011
Shadow Secretary of State for Culture, Media and Sport	Harriet Harman	2011–2015
Shadow Minister for Civil Society	Roberta Blackman-Woods	2010–2011
Shadow Minister for Civil Society	Gareth Thomas	2011–2013
Shadow Minister for Civil Society	Lisa Nandy	2013–2015
Shadow Culture Minister	Gloria De Piero	2010–2011

== Transport ==
Department for Transport
Shadow Secretary of State for Transport	Maria Eagle	2010–2013
Shadow Secretary of State for Transport	Mary Creagh	2013–2014
Shadow Secretary of State for Transport	Michael Dugher	2014–2015
Shadow Minister for Transport	Andrew Gwynne	2010 – 2011
Shadow Minister for Transport	Gordon Marsden	2013 – 2015
Shadow Minister for Aviation, Shipping and Road Safety	Jim Fitzpatrick	2010 – 2013
Shadow Minister for Roads and Road Safety	Richard Burden	2013 – 2015

== Women and Equalities ==
Government Equalities Office
Shadow Secretary of State for Women and Equalities	Yvette Cooper	2010–2013
Shadow Secretary of State for Women and Equalities	Gloria De Piero	2013–2015
Shadow Minister for Women and Equalities	Fiona Mactaggart	2010 – 2011
Shadow Minister for Women and Equalities	Kate Green	2011 – 2013
Shadow Minister for Women and Equalities	Sharon Hodgson	2013 – 2015
Shadow Spokesman in the House of Lords	Baroness Thornton	2011 – 2015

== Wales, Scotland and Northern Ireland ==
Office of the Secretary of State for Wales
Shadow Secretary of State for Wales	Peter Hain	2010–2012
Shadow Secretary of State for Wales	Owen Smith	2012–2015
Shadow Minister for Wales	Owen Smith	2010–2012
Shadow Minister for Wales	Nia Griffith	2011–2015
Office of the Secretary of State for Scotland
Shadow Secretary of State for Scotland	Ann McKechin	2010 – 2011
Shadow Secretary of State for Scotland	Margaret Curran	2011 – 2015
Shadow Minister for Scotland	Tom Greatrex	2010 – 2011
Shadow Minister for Scotland	Willie Bain	2011 – 2013
Shadow Minister for Scotland	Gordon Banks	2013 – 2015
Northern Ireland Office
Shadow Secretary of State for Northern Ireland	Shaun Woodward	2010–2011
Shadow Secretary of State for Northern Ireland	Vernon Coaker	2011–2013
Shadow Secretary of State for Northern Ireland	Ivan Lewis	2013–2015
Shadow Minister for Northern Ireland	Stephen Pound	2010–2015
