= Frontbench team of Pat Rabbitte =

- General: 2016; 2020; 2024
- Presidential: 2011; 2018; 2025
- Local: 2014; 2019; 2024
- European: 2014; 2019; 2024

This is the front bench of Pat Rabbitte, who led the Labour Party from 2002 until 2007. Rabbitte's first shadow cabinet was announced on the afternoon of Monday 4 November 2002.

- Pat Rabbitte - Leader and Northern Ireland
- Liz McManus - Deputy Leader and Health
- Emmet Stagg - Chief Whip and Nuclear Safety
- Brendan Howlin - Enterprise, Trade and Employment
- Eamon Gilmore - Environment and Local Government
- Willie Penrose - Social and Family Affairs
- Roisín Shortall - Transport
- Joan Burton - Finance
- Joe Costello - Justice
- Jan O'Sullivan - Education
- Kathleen Lynch - Consumer Affairs
- Breda Moynihan Cronin - Equality and Law Reform
- Brian O'Shea - Community, Rural and Gaeltacht Affairs
- Michael D. Higgins - Foreign Affairs
- Tommy Broughan - Communications, Marine and Natural Resources and Assistant Whip
- Jack Wall - Arts, Sports and Tourism
- Joe Sherlock - Defence
- Mary Upton - Agriculture and Food Safety
- Sean Ryan - Older Persons Issues
- Seamus Pattison - Leas Ceann Comhairle
