= Yanukovych shadow government =

Shadow government of Ukraine

- Shadow cabinet of Ukraine
- 2007–2010
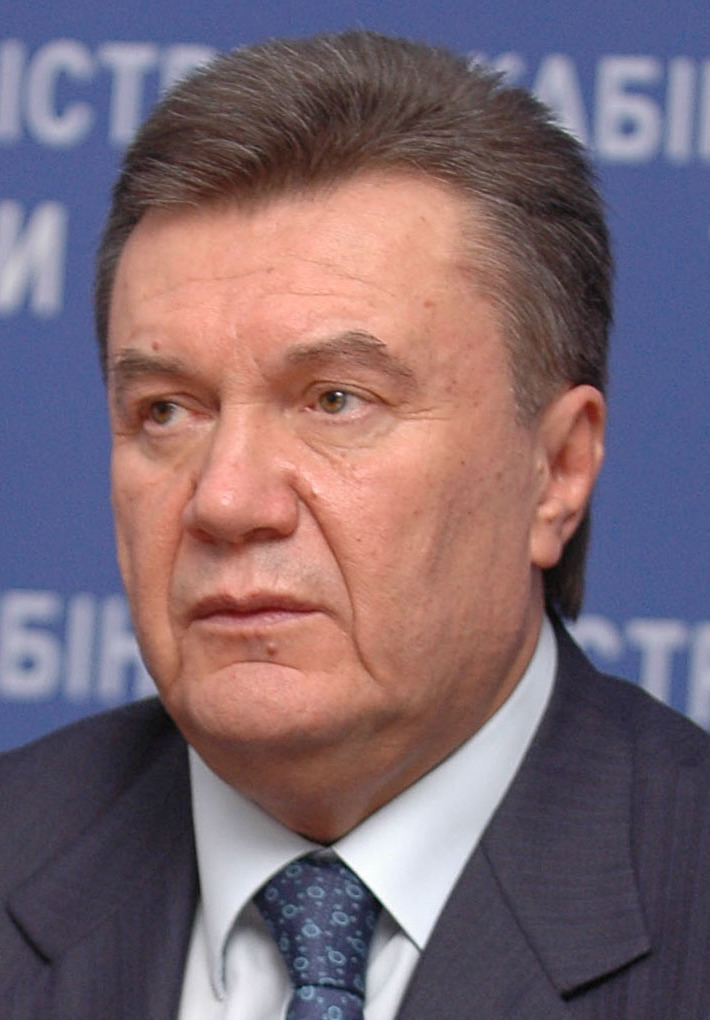
- Viktor Yanukovych in 2007
- Date formed: 21 December 2007
- Date dissolved: 25 February 2010

People and organisations
- President of Ukraine: Viktor Yushchenko
- Shadow Prime Minister: Viktor Yanukovych
- Prime Minister being shadowed: Yulia Tymoshenko (Tymoshenko II)
- No. of ministers: 18
- Total no. of members: 24
- Member party: Party of Regions
- Status in legislature: 175 / 450

History
- Election: 2007 Ukrainian parliamentary election
- Legislature terms: 6th Verkhovna Rada
- Predecessor: Tymoshenko shadow government (1998)
- Successor: Sobolyev shadow government

The shadow government of Viktor Yanukovych was formed on 21 December 2007 as a result of the formation of the second Tymoshenko government, following the 2007 Ukrainian parliamentary election.

== Background ==
Shadow governments are not officialised in Ukraine, nor do they hold any real power and significance. However, a few of them have been formed or tried to be formed before: Yulia Tymoshenko has previously led an opposition shadow government of the Hromada party in 1998, Our Ukraine had proposed to form shadow governments twice: in 2002 and 2006.

By the 2007, when after a long-lasting political crisis, which led to the snap 2007 parliamentary election, the "orange coalition" blocs, BYuT and NUNS, agreed to form a coalition government, largest opposition party in the Verkhovna Rada, Party of Regions, pledged to form a shadow cabinet, if party becomes the opposition. Despite Yanukovych's wishes to form a "united opposition government", other two opposition factions, Lytvyn Bloc and Communist Party of Ukraine stated that they would not join the shadow cabinet.

On 21 December 2007, the shadow cabinet of Viktor Yanukovych gathered for their first meeting in the former headquarters of Yanukovych's presidential campaign team, the Zoryanyi cinema building. Later that day, PR representative, Serhiy Lyovochkin refused to call the cabinet a "shadow" one, and preferred for it to be called "an opposition cabinet". Lyovochkin also added that there would be vacant positions inside the cabinet, like the culture and health ministries, which are available for the other opposition parties, in case of the opposition coalition expansion.

== Composition ==
The shadow cabinet is composed of the shadow prime minister, 20 ministers, and four other members without portfolio (National Bank governor, heads of the Security Service, the State Tax Administration and the State Customs Service).

Portfolio	Name	Party	Took office	Left office
Shadow Prime Minister	Viktor Yanukovych	PR	21 December 2007	25 February 2010
Shadow Minister of Finance	Mykola Azarov	PR	21 December 2007	25 February 2010
Shadow Minister of Economy	Iryna Akimova	PR	21 December 2007	25 February 2010
Shadow Minister of Defense	Oleksandr Kuzmuk	PR	21 December 2007	25 February 2010
Shadow Minister of Internal Affairs	Mykola Dzhyha	PR	21 December 2007	25 February 2010
Shadow Minister of Fuel and Energy	Yuriy Boyko	PR	21 December 2007	25 February 2010
Shadow Minister of Coal Industry	Serhiy Tulub	PR	21 December 2007	25 February 2010
Shadow Ministry of Transport and Communication	Volodymyr Kozak	PR	21 December 2007	25 February 2010
Shadow Minister of Labour and Social Policy	Mykhailo Papiyev	PR	21 December 2007	25 February 2010
Shadow Minister of Education and Science	Dmytro Tabachnyk	PR	21 December 2007	25 February 2010
Shadow Minister of Foreign Affairs	Kostyantyn Hryshchenko	PR	21 December 2007	25 February 2010
Shadow Minister of Justice	Oleksandr Lavrynovych	PR	21 December 2007	25 February 2010
Shadow Minister of Environmental Protection	Anatoliy Tolstoukhov	PR	21 December 2007	25 February 2010
Shadow Minister of Agrarian Policy	Viktor Slauta	PR	21 December 2007	25 February 2010
Shadow Minister of Public Housing and Utilities	Oleksandr Popov	PR	21 December 2007	25 February 2010
Shadow Minister of Family, Youth, and Sports Affairs	Viktor Korzh	PR	21 December 2007	25 February 2010
Shadow Minister of Industry	Anatoliy Kinakh	PR	21 December 2007	25 February 2010
Shadow Minister of Emergency Situations	Nestor Shufrych	PR	21 December 2007	25 February 2010
Shadow Minister of Building and Regional Development	Volodymyr Yatsuba	PR	21 December 2007	25 February 2010
Shadow Minister of Health	Vacant (reserved for other opposition parties)			
Shadow Minister of Culture and Tourism	Vacant (reserved for other opposition parties)			
Members without portfolio
Shadow Governor of the National Bank of Ukraine	Serhiy Lyovochkin	PR	21 December 2007	25 February 2010
Shadow Head of the State Tax Administration	Inna Bohoslovska	PR	21 December 2007	25 February 2010
Shadow Head of the Security Service of Ukraine	Vacant (reserved for other opposition parties)			
Shadow Head of the State Customs Service	Vacant (reserved for other opposition parties)			
