= Liberal Party frontbench, 1945–1956 =

Members of the British Liberal Party's Frontbench Team from 1945 to 1956 (leaderships listed chronologically):

Portfolio	Name	Timeline	
Leader of the Liberal Party	Clement Davies	2 August 1945	5 November 1956
Chief Whip of the House of Commons	Tom Horabin		
Chief Whip of the House of Commons	Frank Byers		
Chief Whip of the House of Commons	Jo Grimond		

Changes

- 1946: Tom Horabin defects to Labour Party and is replaced as Chief Whip by Frank Byers
- July 1949: Violet Bonham Carter becomes Deputy Leader of the party
- February 1950: Jo Grimond replaces Frank Byers as Chief Whip
- 1952: Arthur Holt becomes Parliamentary Chairman of the Liberal Party.
- 1955: Arthur Holt replaced as Parliamentary Chairman of the Liberal Party.

== Liberal MPs ==
- Roderic Bowen 1945-
- Rhys Hopkin Morris Deputy Chairman of Ways and Means 1951–1956 died (1957 Carmarthen by-election
- Lady Megan Lloyd George lost seat in 1951 GE
- Emrys Roberts lost seat in 1951 GE
- Edgar Granville lost seat in 1951 GE
- Wilfrid Roberts lost seat in 1950 GE
- Frank Byers lost seat in 1950 GE
- Gwilym Lloyd George defect to National Liberal in 1948
- George Wadsworth lost seat in 1950 GE
- W. J. Gruffydd did not contest 1950 GE
- Tom Horabin defect to Labour in 1947
- Jo Grimond
- Donald Wade lost seat in 1964 GE
- Archie Macdonald lost seat in 1951 GE
- Arthur Holt lost seat in 1964 GE
