= Frontbench team of Gerry Adams =

Shadow Cabinet of Gerry Adams

- General: 2016; 2020; 2024
- Presidential: 2011; 2018; 2025
- Local: 2014; 2019; 2024
- European: 2014; 2019; 2024

This was the front bench of Gerry Adams, who led Sinn Féin's parliamentary delegation to Dáil Éireann from 2011 until 2018, upon the election of Mary Lou McDonald as leader.

== Initial front bench ==
Adams's first front bench was announced on Tuesday 22 March 2011.

- Gerry Adams - Leader
- Mary Lou McDonald - Deputy Leader and Public Expenditure and Reform
- Pearse Doherty - Finance
- Aengus Ó Snodaigh - Social Protection and Party Whip
- Caoimghín Ó Caoláin - Health and Children
- Peadar Tóibín - Enterprise, Jobs and Innovation and An Gaeltacht
- Jonathan O'Brien - Justice, Equality and Defence
- Pádraig MacLochlainn - Foreign Affairs and Trade
- Martin Ferris - Communications, Energy and Natural Resources
- Seán Crowe - Education and Skills
- Brian Stanley - Environment, Community and Local Government
- Michael Colreavy - Agriculture, Food and Marine
- Dessie Ellis - Transport and Housing
- Sandra McLellan - Arts, Heritage, Tourism and Sport

== 2012 reshuffle ==
Adams announced a reshuffle on 13 September 2012.

- Gerry Adams - Leader
- Mary Lou McDonald - Deputy Leader and Public Expenditure and Reform
- Pearse Doherty - Finance
- Aengus Ó Snodaigh - Social Protection and Party Whip
- Caoimghín Ó Caoláin - Health and Children
- Peadar Tóibín - Enterprise, Jobs and Innovation and An Gaeltacht
- Pádraig MacLochlainn - Justice, Equality and Defence
- Seán Crowe - Foreign Affairs, Trade and Diaspora
- Martin Ferris - Communications, Energy and Natural Resources
- Jonathan O'Brien - Education and Skills
- Brian Stanley - Environment, Community and Local Government
- Michael Colreavy - Agriculture, Food and Marine
- Dessie Ellis - Transport and Housing
- Sandra McLellan - Arts, Heritage, Tourism and Sport

== 2016 reshuffle ==
Following the 2016 general election and government formation, Adams announced these spokespeople on 11 May.

Dáil

- Gerry Adams - Leader
- Mary Lou McDonald - Deputy Leader and all-Ireland Spokesperson on Mental Health & Suicide Prevention
- Aengus Ó Snodaigh - Chief Whip and Defence
- Pearse Doherty - Finance
- Louise O'Reilly - Health
- Carol Nolan - Education & Skills
- Eoin Ó Broin - Housing, Planning & Local Government
- David Cullinane - Public Expenditure & Reform and all-Ireland Spokesperson on Workers' Rights
- Martin Kenny - Agriculture, Food & the Marine
- Peadar Tóibín - Regional Development, Rural Affairs, Arts & the Gaeltacht
- Jonathan O’Brien - Justice & Equality and Drug & Alcohol Abuse
- Donnchadh Ó Laoghaire - Children & Youth Affairs
- Seán Crowe - Foreign Affairs & Trade, the EU and the Diaspora
- John Brady - Social Protection
- Brian Stanley - Communications, Climate Change & Natural Resources
- Maurice Quinlivan - Jobs, Enterprise & Innovation
- Imelda Munster - Transport, Tourism & Sport and Urban Renewal
- Caoimhghín Ó Caoláin - Disability Rights & Older People
- Denise Mitchell - Deputy Whip and Junior Spokesperson on Social Protection
- Dessie Ellis - Junior Spokesperson on Housing, Planning & Local Government
- Kathleen Funchion - Junior Spokesperson on Children & Youth Affairs (with special responsibility for Childcare)
- Martin Ferris - Junior Spokesperson on Agriculture, Food & the Marine (with special responsibility for Fisheries & the Marine)
- Pat Buckley - Junior Spokesperson on Mental Health & Suicide Prevention

Seanad

- Rose Conway-Walsh - Seanad Group Leader and Rural Ireland
- Paul Gavan - Seanad Whip and Workers' Rights & Collective Bargaining
- Pádraig Mac Lochlainn - Jobs & the Economy
- Fintan Warfield - Youth, Arts & LGBT Rights
- Máire Devine - Health & Wellbeing
- Niall Ó Donnghaile - North/South Integration
- Trevor Ó Clochartaigh - An Gaeilge and the Diaspora and Housing, Regional Development, Rural Affairs, Arts & the Gaeltacht
