= Liberal Party frontbench, 1967–1976 =

Members of the British Liberal Party's Frontbench Team from 1967 to 1976 (leaderships listed chronologically):

== Party Spokesmen under Jeremy Thorpe's First Parliament January 1967–June 1970 ==
Mr. Thorpe announced changes in the organisation of the Parliamentary Liberal Party, and the reallocation of duties among the 12 Liberal M Ps. Mr. Jo Grimond. who resigned as Leader of the party last month. has been invited to undertake a general oversight of foreign affairs. defence, and regionalism. His sphere will Include a study of present Common Market trends. East-West Euroman relations,, the future of Nato and its relationship with the Warsaw Pact powers, and Highland development.

Mr. Eric Lubbock. Liberal Whip. will have responsibility for science and technology. power. aviation, housing. public building. land and natural resources.

Duties have been allocated among the other MPs as follows:

Mr. Peter Bessell (Bodmin): trade. transport. second spokesman on land and housing. Mr. James Davidson (Aberdeen West): foreign affairs. defence. Mr. Emlyn Hooson (Montgomery): Wales, law. second spokesman on defence, and Home Office. Mr. Russell Johnston (Invernen): Scottish affairs. Scottish WWI). Mr. A. R. McKenzie (Ross and Cromarty): agnculture. Mr. J. W. Pardoe (Cornwall North): West Country affairs. education. social security. Mr. David Steel (Roxbinth : Selkirk and Peebles): Perlis. mentary aide to Mr. Thorpe. Commonwealth affairs. overseas development. Mr. Richard Wainwright ((Colne Valley): Treasury. labour, economic affairs. Dr. Michael Winstanley (Cheadle,: Rome °Mee. health. Post °Mee. ...

(Source: British Newspaper Archive, Birmingham Post)

=== Changes ===
- June 1969: Upon election to the house, Wallace Lawler becomes Chief Spokesman for Pensions and Housing

== Party Spokesmen under Jeremy Thorpe's Second Parliament June 1970–February 1974 ==
- Jeremy Thorpe: Party Leader
- David Steel: Chief Whip
- John Pardoe: Chief Treasury Spokesman

Changes

1973: On election Alan Beith becomes home affairs spokesman

== Party Spokesmen under Jeremy Thorpe's Third Parliament February 1974–October 1974 ==
- Jeremy Thorpe: Party Leader
- David Steel: Chief Whip, Chief Spokesman for Foreign Affairs and Commonwealth
- John Pardoe: Chief Treasury Spokesman
- Alan Beith: Chief Home Affairs Spokesman

== Party Spokesmen under Jeremy Thorpe's Fourth Parliament October 1974–May 1976 ==
- Jeremy Thorpe: Party Leader
- David Steel: Chief Whip, Chief Spokesman for Foreign Affairs and Commonwealth
- John Pardoe: Chief Treasury Spokesman
- Alan Beith: Chief Home Spokesman

=== Changes ===
- 1975: Cyril Smith becomes Chief Whip

== Party Spokesmen under Jo Grimond's Interim Leadership May 1976–July 1976 ==
- Jo Grimond: Interim Party Leader
- Cyril Smith: Chief Whip
- John Pardoe: Chief Treasury Spokesman
- David Steel: Chief Spokesman for Foreign Affairs and Commonwealth
- Alan Beith: Chief Spokesman for Home Affairs
