= Shadow cabinet =

Feature of the Westminster system of government

The shadow cabinet or shadow ministry is a feature of some parliamentary systems of government, chiefly of the Westminster subtype. It consists of a senior group of opposition spokespeople who, under the leadership of the Leader of the Opposition, form an alternative cabinet to that of the government, and whose members shadow or mirror the positions of each individual member of the Cabinet. Their areas of responsibility, in parallel with the ruling party's ministries, may be referred to as a shadow portfolio. Members of a shadow cabinet have no executive power. It is the shadow cabinet's responsibility to scrutinise the policies and actions of the government, as well as to offer alternative policies. The shadow cabinet makes up the majority of the Official Opposition frontbench, as part of frontbenchers to the parliament. Smaller opposition parties in Britain and Ireland have Frontbench Teams.

In many countries, a member of the shadow cabinet is referred to as a shadow minister. In the United Kingdom's House of Lords and in New Zealand, the term shadow spokesperson is used instead of minister. In Canada, the term opposition critic is also used.

== Description and functions ==
The shadow ministers' duties may give them considerable prominence in the party caucus hierarchy especially if it is a high-profile portfolio. Although the salary and benefits paid from the public treasury to shadow ministers remain the same as for a backbencher—they have no executive responsibilities, unlike cabinet ministers—some opposition parties provide an additional stipend in addition to the salary they receive as legislators while many at least reimburse shadow ministers for any additional expenses incurred that are not otherwise eligible for reimbursement out of public funds. Moreover, in most Westminster-style legislative bodies all recognised parliamentary parties are granted a block of public funding to help their elected members carry out their duties, often in addition to the budgets individual legislators receive to pay for constituency offices and other such expenses. There is typically a stipulation that such funds must be used for official parliamentary business; however, within that restriction, parties can usually distribute the funds among their elected lawmakers as they see fit and thereby provide the money needed to staff and support shadow ministries.

Members of a shadow cabinet may not necessarily be appointed to the corresponding Cabinet post if and when their party forms a government. However, the consistency with which parties assuming power appoint shadow ministers into the actual roles in government varies widely depending on such things as jurisdiction, the traditions and practices of the party assuming government, the exact circumstances surrounding their assumption of power, the prerequisites to serve in the cabinet, and even the importance of the cabinet post in question. Political dynamics based around coalition government add another element of unpredictability: parties that sit together in a shadow cabinet are not guaranteed to serve as coalition partners, and a once-opposition party that comes to power might rely on the same junior coalition partners as the previous government. For example, in the Netherlands, Joop den Uyl's shadow cabinet shadowed the De Jong cabinet, which had the Anti-Revolutionary Party (ARP) as one of its coalition partners. Once the Den Uyl cabinet was formed, it also had the ARP as a coalition member.

As well as being potential future ministers, a number of shadow ministers have held ministerial posts in the past.

As a mark of discipline, shadow ministers are expected to speak within and not outside their portfolio areas.

== Cultural applications ==
In the United Kingdom, Canada, New Zealand, and Australia, the major opposition party and specifically its shadow cabinet is called His (or Her) Majesty's Loyal Opposition. The adjective loyal is used because, while the role of the opposition is to oppose His Majesty's Government, it does not dispute the sovereign's right to the throne and therefore the legitimacy of the government. However, in other countries that use the Westminster system, the opposition is known simply as the parliamentary opposition.

In most Westminster systems, the leader of the opposition heads the shadow cabinet in person and directly shadows the prime minister, and the title of "shadow prime minister" is generally not used. Non-Westminster systems that have adopted a shadow cabinet system, however, typically designate its head as "shadow prime minister". Moreover, in these systems, the shadow prime minister is not necessarily the leader of the opposition party (for example, in Czechia, ANO 2011 party leader Andrej Babiš designated Karel Havlíček as the party's shadow prime minister) and is not necessarily expected to become prime minister if the opposition party assumes power.

Some parliamentary parties, notably the Australian Labor Party, elect all the members of their shadow cabinets in a party room ballot, with the shadow prime minister then allocating portfolios to the shadow ministers. In other parliamentary parties, the membership and composition of the shadow cabinet is generally determined solely by the shadow prime minister.

A related term is the shadow budget, which is often prepared by shadow cabinets (and, when released, usually presented by the shadow finance minister or equivalent) as an alternative to the real budget presented by the government. When prepared and released in an election year, an opposition party's shadow budget will typically form a key part of the party's manifesto, and will be largely if not wholly implemented if the opposition party subsequently forms a government (especially if it wins an outright majority).

=== Third parties ===
In many jurisdictions that have the Westminster system's typical dynamics of two large parties alternating in power, third parties (who are neither participants in the government nor in the official opposition) may also form their own parliamentary front benches of spokespersons. However, parliamentary standing orders on the right of parties to speak often dictate that it can only be granted to a party or group if a minimum number of members can be recorded by the party. In Ireland, for example, technical groups are often formed by third parties and independent TDs in the Dáil Éireann in order to increase the members' right to speak against larger parties which can afford the right to speak as front benches in government or opposition.

In political systems where the parliamentary dynamics revolve around multiparty coalition governments, however, the shadow cabinet is typically backed by a "shadow coalition" of like-minded opposition parties. For example, the Den Uyl shadow cabinet in the Netherlands was formed not only of Joop den Uyl's Labour Party but also of Democrats 66 and the Political Party of Radicals, while the Yanukovych shadow government in Ukraine, which was made up of only one party, left the culture and health shadow portfolios vacant and reserved them for other opposition parties in case they would join the shadow coalition.

Opposition parliamentary parties which are sufficiently small that they are about the same size as the government cabinet will often appoint all of their elected members to their shadow cabinet or equivalent, with third parties more likely compared to official opposition parties to use this sort of arrangement. If the parliamentary party is only slightly larger than the government's cabinet, its leadership potentially faces the awkward position of embarrassing a small minority of legislators by singling them out for exclusion from the shadow cabinet. On the other hand, incoming governments in the Westminster system often change the number and/or composition of ministries upon assuming office. Therefore, one solution to such an aforementioned issue when it occurs is to create nominal shadow "ministries" that correspond to currently nonexistent cabinet posts the party actually intends to create once in government. An opposition party can also employ this process in reverse by "merging" its shadow ministries to correspond to actual cabinet posts the opposition party wants to merge or otherwise eliminate.

=== Use outside English-speaking countries ===
While the practice of parliamentary shadow cabinets or frontbenches is not widespread in Germany, party leaders have often formed boards of experts and advisors ("teams of experts", or Kompetenzteam, in CDU/CSU and SPD parlance; alternate "top team", or Spitzenteam, in Bündnis '90/Die Grünen parlance).

In France, although the formation of a shadow cabinet is not compulsory or common, several shadow cabinets have been formed.

In Hungary, a shadow cabinet under the leadership of Klára Dobrev was established by the strongest opposition party, the Democratic Coalition, for the first time, in 2022.

In Japan, the term "Next Cabinet" was coined for the de facto shadow cabinet, though it has only been used by the Democratic Party of Japan and its successors.

In Turkey, the main opposition party, CHP, formed a shadow cabinet after the election of Özgür Özel as its leader, in 2023.

== By country ==
Australia

- Shadow cabinet of Australia (Liberal Party of Australia, Angus Taylor)
  - List of state and territory shadow cabinets

The Bahamas

- Shadow Cabinet (Free National Movement, Michael Pintard)

Bangladesh

- Shadow Cabinet of Bangladesh (11 Party Alliance)

Cameroon

- Shadow Cabinet (Social Democratic Front)

SDF Shadow Cabinet

Canada

- Official Opposition Shadow Cabinet of the 45th Parliament of Canada (Conservative Party of Canada, Pierre Poilievre)

Ontario

- Official Opposition Shadow Cabinet of the 44th Legislative Assembly of Ontario (New Democratic Party of Ontario, Marit Stiles)
France

- Shadow Cabinet of France

Hungary

- Shadow Cabinet (Democratic Coalition, Klára Dobrev)

Indonesia

- Shadow Cabinet of Indonesia (Kabinet Bayangan)

Iran

- Shadow Cabinet (Saeed Jalili)

Ireland

- Opposition Front Bench (Sinn Féin, Mary Lou McDonald)

Israel

- Shadow Cabinet of Tommy Lapid (Tommy Lapid)

Italy

- Shadow Cabinet of Italy (Governo ombra) (Walter Veltroni)

Jamaica

- Shadow Cabinet of Jamaica (People's National Party)

Japan

- Next Cabinet (Constitutional Democratic Party of Japan)

Lithuania

- Shadow Cabinet of Lithuania (Šešėlinis kabinetas) (Andrius Kubilius).

Malaysia

- Shadow Cabinet of Malaysia (Perikatan Nasional, Hamzah Zainuddin)

The Netherlands

- Den Uyl shadow cabinet (Labour Party, Democrats 66, Political Party of Radicals, Joop den Uyl)

New Zealand

- Shadow Cabinet of Chris Hipkins (New Zealand Labour Party, Chris Hipkins)

Serbia

- Shadow Cabinet (Democratic Party, Bojan Pajtić)

Solomon Islands

- Shadow Cabinet (Democratic Party and allies)

South Africa

- Official Opposition Shadow Cabinet (uMkhonto we Sizwe, John Hlophe)

Sudan

- Sudanese Shadow Government (Official website, Wael Omer Abdin)

Thailand

- Shadow Cabinet (Democrat Party, Abhisit Vejjajiva)

Turkey

- Shadow Cabinet (Republican People's Party, Özgür Özel)

Ukraine

- Shadow Government (Bloc of Yulia Tymoshenko, Arseniy Yatsenyuk)
- Yanukovych shadow government

United Kingdom

- Official Opposition frontbench/Official Opposition Shadow Cabinet (Conservatives, Kemi Badenoch)

Scotland

- Shadow Cabinet (Scottish Labour, Anas Sarwar MSP)
- Shadow Cabinet (Reform UK Scotland, Malcolm Offord MSP)

Wales

- Shadow Cabinet (Reform UK, Dan Thomas MS)

== See also ==
- Minority leader
- Frontbench Team
- Government-in-exile
