= Frontbench team of Eamon Gilmore =

These are the front benches of Eamon Gilmore from 2007 until 2011, before he became Tánaiste. Gilmore led the Labour Party between 2007 and 2014. He was confirmed unopposed as leader on 6 September 2007, succeeding Pat Rabbitte.

== Initial front bench ==
This was announced in 2007.

- Eamon Gilmore - Party Leader
- Emmet Stagg - Chief Whip
- Joe Costello - Spokesperson on European Affairs, Defence and Assistant Party Whip
- Proinsias De Rossa Vice-President, European Socialist Group
- Joan Burton - Spokesperson on Finance
- Brendan Howlin - Spokesperson on Constitutional Matters and Law Reform
- Pat Rabbitte - Spokesperson on Justice
- Brian O'Shea - Spokesperson on Defence and the Irish language
- Willie Penrose - Spokesperson on Enterprise, Trade and Employment
- Jan O'Sullivan - Spokesperson on Health
- Ruairi Quinn - Spokesperson on Education and Science
- Dominic Hannigan - Spokesperson on Commuter Issues; Crime and Policing; Environment and Climate Change; Community and Rural Affairs
- Michael D. Higgins - Spokesperson on Foreign Affairs
- Tommy Broughan - Spokesperson on Transport
- Alan Kelly - Spokesperson on Tourism; Finance; Local Government
- Ciarán Lynch - Spokesperson on Housing and Local Government
- Kathleen Lynch - Spokesperson on Disability Issues and Equality
- Michael McCarthy - Spokesperson on Communications, Energy and Natural Resources; Marine; Agriculture and Food
- Liz McManus - Spokesperson on Communications, Energy and
- Phil Prendergast - Spokesperson on Health; Arts and Sports; Social and Family Affairs
- Brendan Ryan - Spokesperson on Consumer Affairs; Education and Science; Transport; Defence
- Séan Sherlock - Spokesperson on Agriculture and Food
- Roisin Shortall - Spokesperson on Social and Family Affairs
- Joanna Tuffy - Spokesperson on Environment and Heritage
- Mary Upton - Spokesperson on Arts, Sport and Tourism
- Jack Wall - Spokesperson on Community and Rural Affairs
- Alex White - Seanad Group Leader and Spokesperson on Children; Foreign Affairs; Northern Ireland; Enterprise, Trade and Employment; Equality and Immigration
