= Liberal Party frontbench, 1956–1967 =

Members of the British Liberal Party's Frontbench Team from 1956 to 1967 (leaderships listed chronologically):

== Party Spokesmen under Jo Grimond's First Two Parliaments November 1956–October 1964 ==
- Jo Grimond: Party Leader
- Donald Wade: Chief Whip

=== Changes ===
- 1958: Mark Bonham Carter becomes Foreign Affairs Spokesman upon election to parliament in March 1958. (Ballot Box to Jury Box: The Life and Times of an English Crown Court Judge). However he lost his seat at the October '59 general election.
- 1961: Christopher Layton appointed as Economic Spokesman (ref. The Liberal Party and the Economy, 1929–1964)
- May 1962: Arthur Holt replaces Donald Wade as Chief Whip
- 1962: Donald Wade appointed as Deputy Leader of the Liberal Party
- 1963: Eric Lubbock replaces Arthur Holt as Chief Whip

== Party Spokesmen under Jo Grimond's First Two Parliaments October 1964–June 1966 ==
- Jo Grimond: Party Leader
- Eric Lubbock: Chief Whip
- Alasdair Mackenzie: Agriculture, Food, Fisheries, Posts and Telecommunications
- Alec Peterson: Education Spokesman (ref. again Lib Party and Economy)

=== Changes ===
- March 1965: Upon election to the House, David Steel becomes Chief Spokesman for Work.
- 1965: Eric Lubbock is noted as being 'Liberal Aviation Spokesman' in documentation from this time.

== Party Spokesmen under Jo Grimond's Final Parliament March 1966–January 1967 ==
- Jo Grimond: Party Leader
- Eric Lubbock: Chief Whip
- Richard Wainwright: Chief Treasury Spokesman
- James Davidson: Chief Foreign Affairs and Defence Spokesman
- Alasdair Mackenzie: Chief Agriculture, Food, Fisheries, Posts and Telecommunications Spokesman
- David Steel: Chief Work Spokesman
