= Luke Fletcher (politician) =

Welsh politician

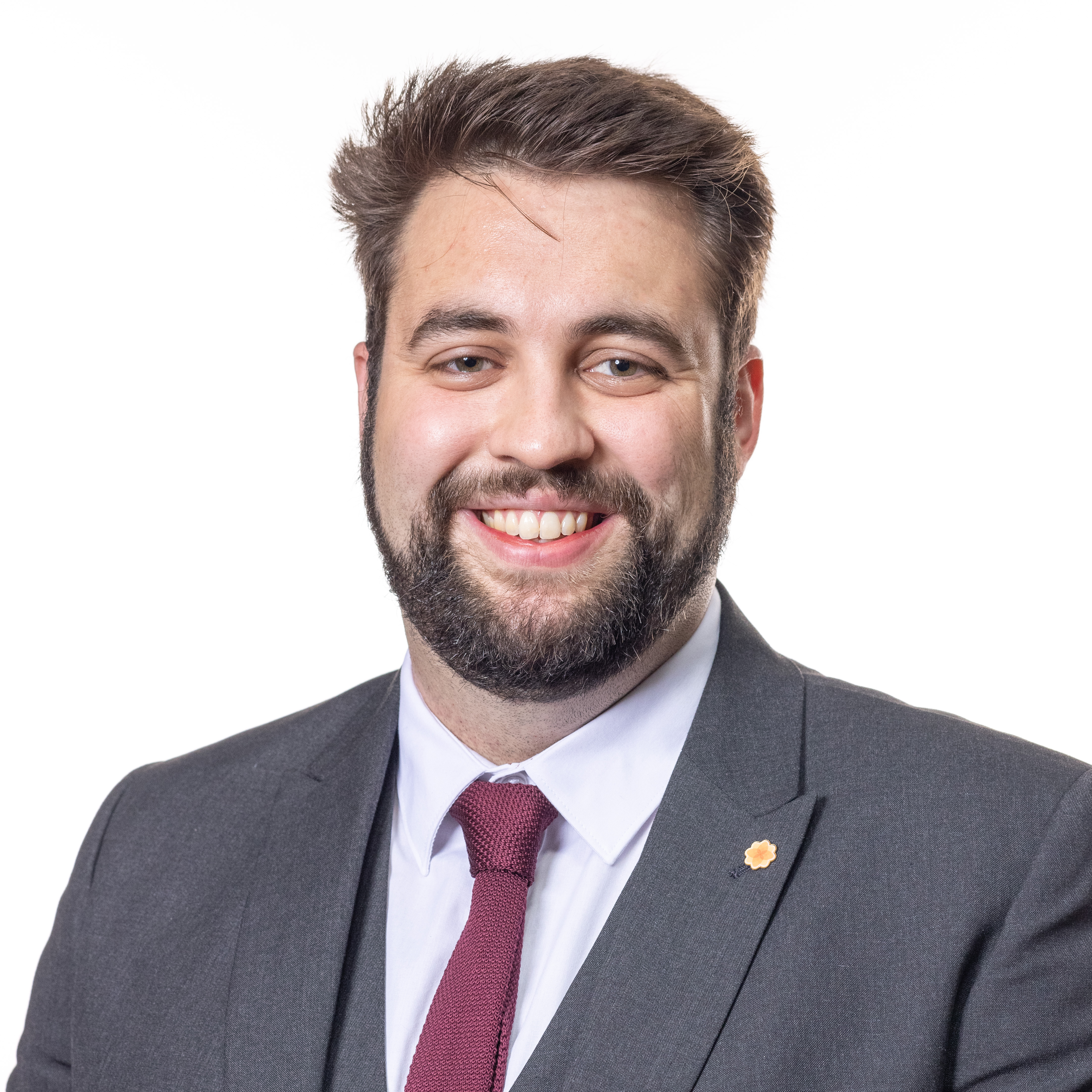
- Official portrait, 2021

Member of the Senedd for South Wales West
- In office 7 May 2021 – 8 April 2026
- Succeeded by: Constituency abolished

Personal details
- Born: Pencoed, Wales
- Party: Plaid Cymru
- Education: Cardiff University

Luke Fletcher is a Welsh politician who was a Member of the Senedd (MS) for the South Wales West region from 2021 to 2026. He is a member of Plaid Cymru.

== Early life and education ==
Fletcher was born and raised in Pencoed and attended Ysgol Gymraeg Bro Ogwr primary school and Ysgol Gyfun Llanhari. Fletcher then studied Politics and International Relations at Cardiff University and completed a Master's degree in Welsh Government and Politics. He worked in a bar for five years before he started working as an economy and finance researcher.

== Political career ==
He stood as Plaid Cymru's parliamentary candidate in Ogmore in the 2019 general election and finished fourth.

He contested the Ogmore constituency at the 2021 Senedd election, finishing 2nd. Fletcher was then elected as a Member of the Senedd for the region of South Wales West.

During his term in the Senedd, Fletcher was Plaid Cymru's economy spokesperson.

He contested the 2026 Senedd election in the Pen-y-bont Bro Morgannwg constituency, in third place on the party's list, after losing a selection battle with local councillor Mark Hooper. He failed to gain re-election.
