= Liberal Party frontbench, 1976–1988 =

Members of the British Liberal Party's Frontbench Team from 1976 to 1988 (leaderships listed chronologically):

== Party Spokesmen under David Steel's First Parliament July 1976–April 1977 ==
- David Steel: Party Leader
- John Pardoe: Deputy Leader and Chief Treasury Spokesman
- Jeremy Thorpe: Foreign Affairs
- Emlyn Hooson: Home Affairs
- Cyril Smith: Chief Whip
- Clement Freud: Northern Ireland Spokesman
- Lord Kimberley: Aviation Spokesman

== Party Spokesmen under David Steel's First Parliament April 1977–May 1979 ==
- David Steel: Party Leader
- John Pardoe: Deputy Leader and Chief Treasury Spokesman
- Jeremy Thorpe: Foreign Affairs
- Cyril Smith: Employment
- Alan Beith: Chief Whip
- Clement Freud: Northern Ireland, Broadcasting and the Arts
- Lord Kimberley: Aviation Spokesman
