= 2023 Plaid Cymru leadership election =

Plaid Cymru leadership election

- 16 May – 16 June 2023
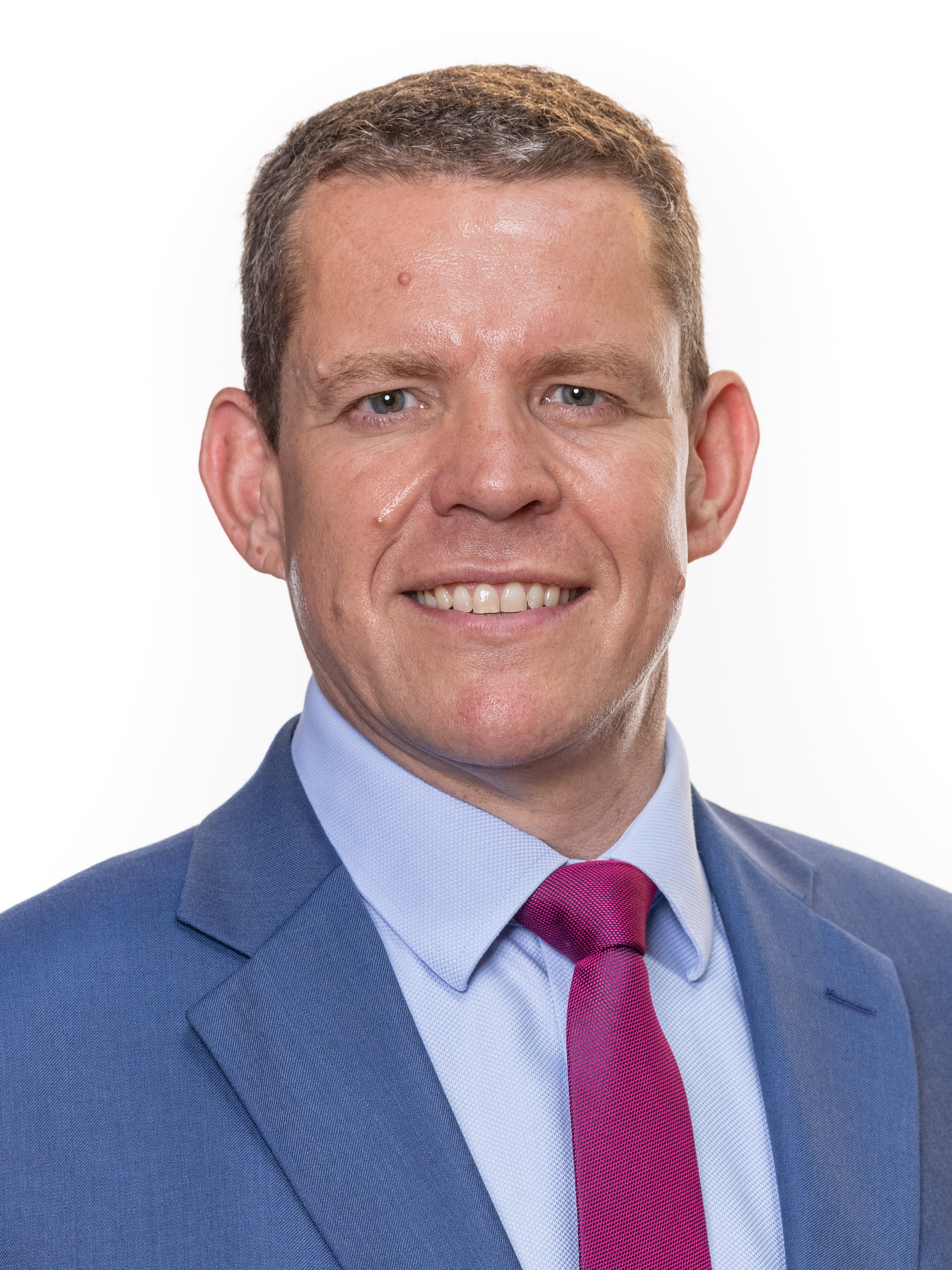
Candidate	Rhun ap Iorwerth
Popular vote	Unopposed
Leader before election
Llyr Gruffydd (acting)
Adam Price
Elected Leader
Rhun ap Iorwerth

The 2023 Plaid Cymru leadership election was triggered by the resignation of Adam Price as party leader on 16 May, after an internal report found the party to have a "culture of harassment, bullying and misogyny". Rhun ap Iorwerth became leader on 16 June 2023 unopposed.

== Background ==
Leanne Wood was elected leader of Plaid Cymru in 2012. The party re-elects its leaders every two years, typically unchallenged. In 2018, following growing discontent with the party's election performance, she was challenged by two members of the Welsh Assembly (now Senedd): Rhun ap Iorwerth and Adam Price. Price was elected, with ap Iorwerth coming second and Wood coming third. Price had advocated "equidistance" between Labour and the Conservatives, while Wood was seen as closer to Labour under Jeremy Corbyn and ap Iorweth as more willing to work with the Conservatives.

In the 2021 Senedd election, Plaid Cymru made a net gain of one seat to hold thirteen overall, though Wood was not re-elected. The result was considered disappointing for the party. The party formed a "co-operation agreement" on several areas of policy with the governing Labour Party. In March 2023, the party produced a new political strategy that would enable it to enter a coalition with Labour in the future while ruling out working with the Conservatives.

In November 2022, party figures complained that Price's leadership had developed a "toxic atmosphere" where members felt afraid to make complaints in case they faced retaliation, and that complaints were not handled effectively. High-profile incidents included the readmittance to the party of Jonathan Edwards, an MP who was cautioned by the police for domestic violence against his wife, and waiting until an external investigation to suspend Rhys ab Owen, an MS accused of breaking the code of conduct. In December, Price commissioned the former member of the Senedd Nerys Evans to write a report into the party's complaints process. The report was published in May 2023, finding a "culture of harassment, bullying and misogyny" in the party. Price apologised on behalf of Plaid Cymru, saying there had been times "whereby unacceptable behaviour has been allowed to take place or go unchallenged and that our processes and governance arrangements have been inadequate to address this". Price announced his resignation on 10 May. Llyr Gruffydd has been nominated to be interim leader while a permanent replacement is elected. Former leader Leanne Wood later confirmed that "there were historic issues and incidences especially on the sexual harassment side of things" during her leadership (2012–2018), but there wasn't a "toxic culture amongst the staff." Wood also said that the next leader should be a woman and that Plaid should avoid a coronation of an unopposed leader.

== Timetable and procedure ==
Only members of the Plaid Cymru group in the Senedd are eligible to stand for election, with the interim leader ineligible to stand. Nominations closed on 16 June.

== Winner ==
On 16 June 2023 Rhun ap Iorwerth became leader of Plaid Cymru after nominations closed and no other candidate put themselves forward.

=== Declared ===
On 30 May 2023, Rhun ap Iorwerth, joint deputy leader since 2018 and MS for Ynys Môn, declared that he would be running in the election.

=== Ineligible ===
The MPs Ben Lake and Liz Saville Roberts were also included in media coverage, but were ineligible to serve as leader due to not being members of the Senedd.

=== Declined ===
- Delyth Jewell, MS for South Wales East since 2019, shadow minister for climate change, energy and transport.
- Elin Jones, Llywydd of the Senedd since 2016, MS for Ceredigion since 1999.
- Heledd Fychan, MS for South Wales Central since 2021.
- Mabon ap Gwynfor, MS for Dwyfor Meirionnydd since 2021, shadow minister for agriculture, rural affairs, housing and planning.
- Siân Gwenllian, joint deputy leader since 2018, MS for Arfon since 2016.

The other eligible candidates Cefin Campbell, Luke Fletcher, Peredur Owen Griffiths and Sioned Williams also declined.
