= 2018 Plaid Cymru leadership election =

Plaid Cymru leadership election

- 7 August – 28 September 2018
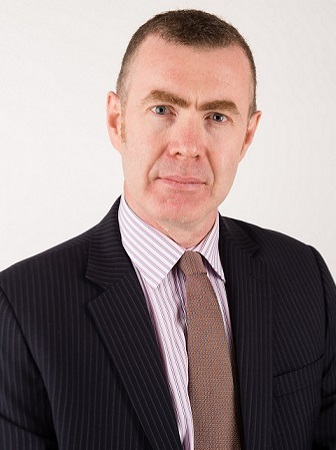

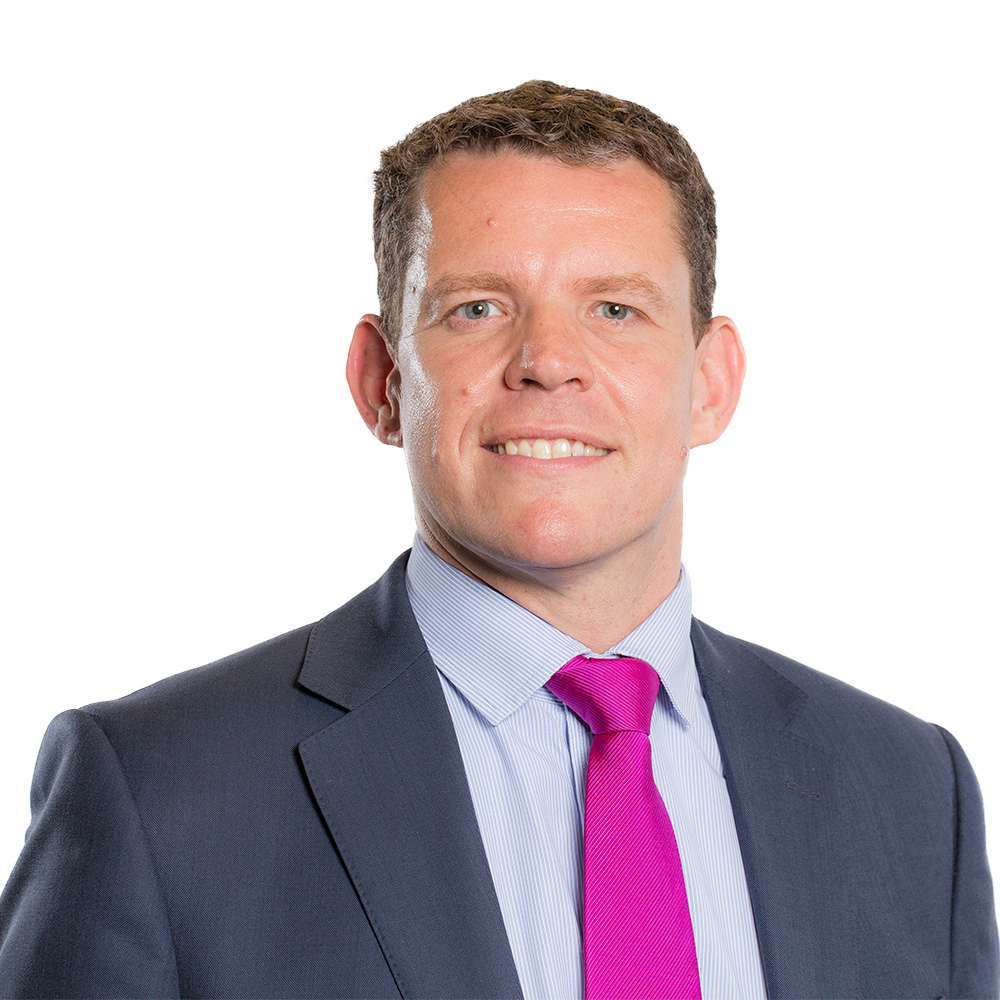

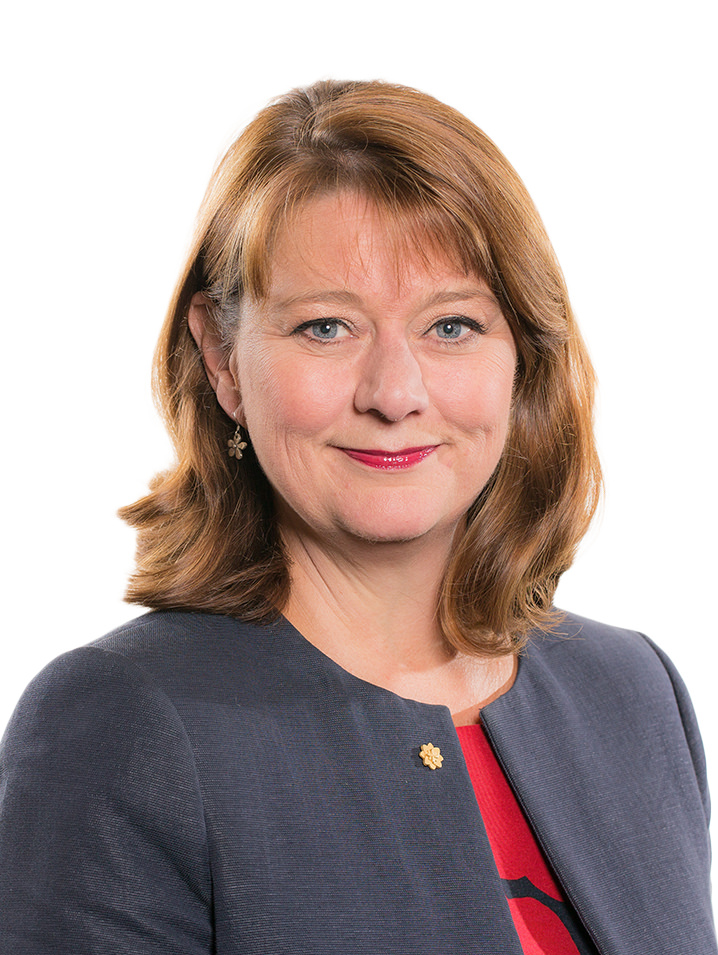
Candidate	Adam Price	Rhun ap Iorwerth	Leanne Wood
First round	2,863	1,613	1,286
Percentage	49.7%	28.0%	22.3%
Second round	3,481	1,961	Eliminated
Percentage	64.0%	36.0%	Eliminated
Leader before election
Leanne Wood
Elected Leader
Adam Price

The 2018 election for the leader of the Welsh political party Plaid Cymru began on 7 August. Voting closed at midnight on 27 September. Adam Price was declared the winner on 28 September, defeating the two other candidates.

A prospective leadership election was first announced after Rhun ap Iorwerth, Assembly Member (AM) for Ynys Môn and Adam Price, AM for Carmarthen East and Dinefwr, both declared their intention to challenge the incumbent leader, Leanne Wood. Speculation about a leadership election arose after what were perceived to be disappointing showings in recent elections, which led some figures within the party to comment that Plaid was potentially stagnant.

== Background ==
Leanne Wood was elected leader of Plaid Cymru in March 2012 with 57% of the vote, defeating Elin Jones and Dafydd Elis-Thomas.

Under Plaid Cymru's constitution, the leader is subject to re-election every two years, but this is usually uncontested. The window for any leadership challenge closed on 4 July 2018, when Wood was challenged by two of her Assembly colleagues. Wood submitted her nomination papers in June 2018.

Wood admitted that she was preparing to resign following Plaid's results in the 2017 general election until the result in Ceredigion came through showing a Plaid Cymru gain. During the summer of 2017, Rhun ap Iorwerth publicly announced that it would be 'very probable' that he would stand when a vacancy arose. On 13 June 2018 Wood stated that she would resign as leader in 2021 if she failed to become First Minister. She had previously stated that she would welcome any challenge to her leadership. On 14 June it was revealed that a letter had been circulated by AMs Llyr Huws Gruffydd, Siân Gwenllian and Elin Jones, asking colleagues to consider putting their names forward. The Carmarthenshire Plaid council group wrote to encourage Adam Price to stand against Wood.

On 26 June former MP Elfyn Llwyd said in a BBC Radio Cymru podcast that "[Plaid Cymru has] been standing still for five to seven years now and perhaps that suggests that it's time to change the team." On 1 July 2018, fifty-three (out of about 200) of Plaid Cymru's principal Councillors wrote to pledge their allegiance to Leanne Wood ahead of any potential leadership challenge.

== Campaign ==
On 4 July 2018, both Rhun ap Iorwerth and Adam Price formally announced that they would be challenging Wood for the party leadership. Wood reaffirmed her plan to stand as a candidate in the ensuing election. Whilst Wood is seen as ideologically close to Labour leader Jeremy Corbyn, ap Iorwerth is considered more willing to work with the Conservative Party, while Price has advocated "equidistance", advocating for Plaid Cymru to position itself equally between the Labour Party and the Conservative Party.

Wood ruled out making any sort of deal with the Conservatives after the 2021 assembly election, while Adam Price ruled out a coalition deal with either the Conservative Party or the Labour Party.

Price proposed changing the name of the party to the "New Wales Party", and set out a timeline for Welsh independence by 2030.

The candidates disagreed about Wylfa Newydd, a proposed nuclear power station on Anglesey. Adam Price opposed it, describing it as "incompatible with independence", whilst ap Iorwerth, who represents the area in the Assembly, supported the scheme. Wood said that the party would review its energy policies if she were to be re-elected.

In July, Price proposed increasing income tax by 1p to fund education. In August, he proposed reducing all income tax rates by 9p as well as abolishing business rates and council tax. He said that this second proposal would be funded by a 3% land value tax levied on non-agricultural land.

Ap Iorwerth proposed a new infrastructure commission, and increasing the proportion of government procurement spending inside Wales.

== Hustings ==
Hustings were held across Wales during the campaign period in September. The location and dates were as follows:

- 4 September – Pontypridd
- 5 September – Neath
- 6 September – Blackwood
- 8 September – Carmarthen
- 10 September – Bangor
- 11 September – Llangollen
- 12 September – Porthmadog
- 17 September – Aberystwyth

== Candidates ==
Candidate	Portrait	Seat	Endorsements
Rhun ap Iorwerth		Ynys Môn since 2013	Jocelyn Davies, former Assembly Member; Elin Jones, Assembly Member; Mark Lewis Jones, actor; Ieuan Wyn Jones, former leader, AM and MP; Ben Lake, Member of Parliament; Elfyn Llwyd, former Member of Parliament and Westminster group leader; Dafydd Wigley, former Leader and member of the House of Lords
Adam Price		Carmarthen East and Dinefwr since 2016 Carmarthen East and Dinefwr (UK Parliament seat) 2001–2010	Simon Brooks, academic and writer; Cynog Dafis, former Assembly Member and Member of Parliament; Catrin Dafydd, author, scriptwriter and poet; Fflur Dafydd, novelist and musician; Jonathan Edwards, Member of Parliament; Llŷr Gruffydd, Assembly Member; Eurfyl ap Gwilym, economist; Gareth Jones, former Assembly Member; Dafydd Llywelyn, Police and Crime Commissioner; Geraint Lövgreen, singer-songwriter; Sharon Morgan, actor; John Osmond, former think tank director; Liz Saville Roberts, Member of Parliament and Westminster group leader; Hywel Williams, Member of Parliament; Siân Gwenllian, Assembly Member
Leanne Wood		Rhondda since 2016 South Wales Central 2003–2016	Arfon Jones, Police and Crime Commissioner; Dai Lloyd, Assembly Member; Lindsay Whittle, former Assembly Member

== Results ==
The winner was declared on 28 September.

Candidate	First round		Second round		
Candidate	Votes	%	Transfers	Votes	%
Adam Price	2,863	49.7%	▲618	3,481	64.0
Rhun ap Iorwerth	1,613	28.0%	▲348	1,961	36.0
Leanne Wood	1,286	22.3%			
Total		5,762	966	5,442	100
