= 2026 Cardiff Agreement =

2026 UK pro-independence agreement

- Created: 14 September 2026
- Signatories: Rhun ap Iorwerth, Michelle O'Neill and John Swinney

Full text
- Cardiff Agreement (Cytundeb Caerdydd): agreement between Welsh and Scottish Government at Wikisource

The Cardiff Agreement (Welsh: Cytundeb Caerdydd; Irish: Comhaontú Chaerdydd; Scottish Gaelic: Aonta Caerdydd) is a memorandum of understanding signed on 14 September 2026 by the leaders of Plaid Cymru, the Scottish National Party (SNP) and Sinn Féin setting out a shared commitment to independence from the United Kingdom for Wales and Scotland, alongside reunification for Northern Ireland with the Republic of Ireland. The agreement was signed in Cardiff by Rhun ap Iorwerth, First Minister of Wales and leader of Plaid Cymru; John Swinney, First Minister of Scotland and leader of the SNP; and Michelle O’Neill, First Minister of Northern Ireland and Sinn Féin's vice president. Sinn Féin president Mary Lou McDonald, leader of the opposition in the Dáil also took part in the signing. The four leaders participated in their capacity as party leaders rather than as members of their respective governments.

The agreement states that the current United Kingdom is "unjust and unsustainable" and calls on the British government to prepare for, plan and facilitate constitutional change. It marks the first time since the introduction of devolution that Scotland, Wales and Northern Ireland have been all led by governments committed to withdrawing from the United Kingdom. It also sets out planned areas of cooperation between the Scottish and Welsh governments, including tackling child poverty, addressing the cost-of-living crisis, pressures and international engagement. The leaders also outlined ambitions for partnership on the economy, energy and international cooperation.

== Background ==
Northern Ireland, Scotland, and Wales striped in the United Kingdom

In May 2026, for the first time, all of the three devolved governments of Scotland, Northern Ireland and Wales are led by separatist parties, with the main separatist party being the largest party in each of the three devolved legislatures. This follows Plaid Cymru winning the most seats in the 2026 Senedd election, the party's first win to Wales' parliament.

The signing came two days after Donald Trump said he would like to see Ireland united, and followed the 2026 election, which had rearranged the political landscape of the devolved nations.

== Reactions ==
British Prime Minister Andy Burnham responded that there was no agreement in Scotland on holding an independence referendum and no clear evidence that a majority in Northern Ireland favoured leaving the UK, to which Swinney replied that Burnham risked being remembered as "the last prime minister of the United Kingdom."

On 24 September 2026, Russian Foreign Minister Sergey Lavrov referenced the declaration, questioning what would be the United Nations Secretariat's response to the plans of the three countries, after the Secretary-General had stated the principle of self-determination did not cover Russia's claims in Crimea and Donbas.
