= Jonathan Edwards (Welsh politician) =

Welsh politician (born 1976)

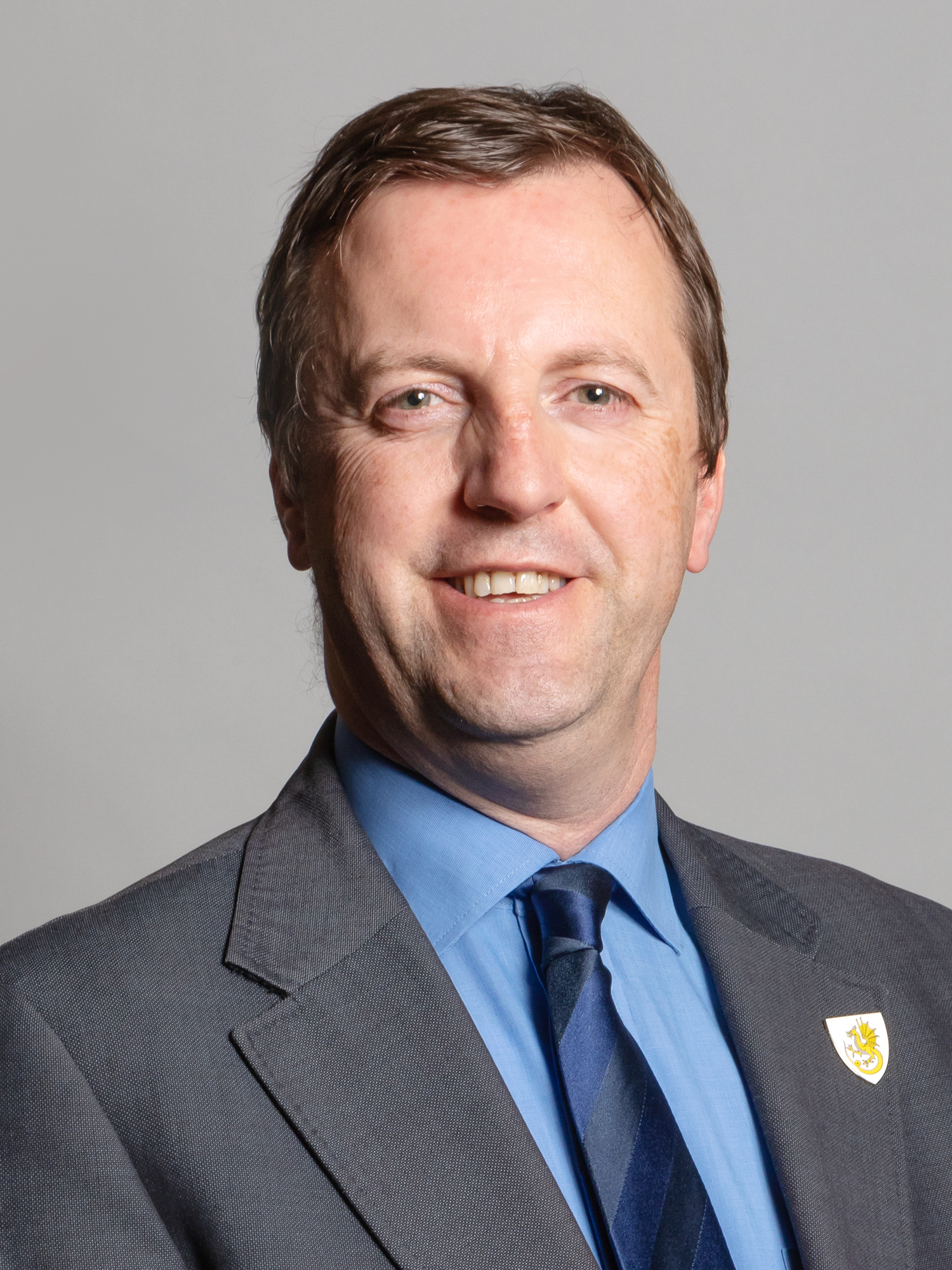
- Official portrait, 2020

Member of Parliament for Carmarthen East and Dinefwr
- In office 6 May 2010 – 30 May 2024
- Preceded by: Adam Price
- Succeeded by: Constituency abolished

Personal details
- Born: 26 April 1976 (age 50) Capel Hendre, Carmarthenshire, Wales
- Party: Independent (2020–present)
- Other political affiliations: Plaid Cymru (until 2020)

David Jonathan Edwards (born 26 April 1976) is a Welsh politician who served as the Member of Parliament (MP) for Carmarthen East and Dinefwr from 2010 to 2024. Initially elected as a Plaid Cymru MP. He sat as an independent MP after the party's disciplinary panel suspended him in 2020. His membership of Plaid was restored in July 2022, and the whip was returned the following month although following further revelations he stated that he would not rejoin the Plaid group of MPs at Westminster.

== Early life ==
David Jonathan Edwards was born in Carmarthenshire on 26 April 1976. He was educated at Ysgol Maes yr Yrfa before studying history and politics at the University of Wales, Aberystwyth. He went on to complete a postgraduate degree in international history.

Edwards worked as a staff member for Rhodri Glyn Thomas and Adam Price before working for Plaid Cymru from 2005 to 2007. He worked at Citizens Advice Cymru from 2007 to 2010.

== Political career ==
Price stood down as MP for Carmarthen East and Dinefwr before the 2010 general election. Edwards was the new candidate for Plaid Cymru, and he was elected with 35.6% of the vote. In January 2012, Edwards submitted an early day motion for a Cornish Assembly, being supported by fellow Plaid Cymru MPs Hywel Williams and Elfyn Llwyd, as well Paul Flynn of Labour. He ran Leanne Wood's successful campaign in the 2012 Plaid Cymru leadership election. In 2014, Edwards criticised Wales rugby captain Sam Warburton for describing himself as British whilst representing the British and Irish Lions. In the run up to the 2014 Scottish independence referendum he was criticised for saying that unionists "loathe" their country.

Edwards was re-elected in the 2015 general election with 38.4% of the vote. He was appointed as the leader of the Plaid Cymru group in the House of Commons in May 2015, a role he held until October 2015. Edwards supports foxhunting and backed the Conservatives' plans to relax the Hunting Act 2004 in 2015. The Welsh Conservatives criticised a leaflet Edwards wrote for Price in 2016 describing him as Mab Darogan, a figure from folklore destined to force the English out of Britain. In January 2016, he called for the return of Welsh bank notes, which Plaid Cymru proposed could be issued by the Lloyds Banking Group, as well as calling for the renaming of the Bank of England to "Sterling Central Bank" to better reflect the UK as a whole. Acting as Plaid Cymru's Brexit spokesperson, Edwards described the Brexit bill as the "biggest job-killing act in Welsh economic history". He introduced an amendment which would have required the government to report on the effect on Wales' public finances, which was defeated.

He held his parliamentary seat during the 2017 general election with 39.3% of the vote. In a speech at Plaid Cymru's March 2018 spring conference, Edwards warned against his party moving any further to the left politically: "I would appeal to my party not to respond to the electoral challenges we face from Corbyn's Labour by basing our political strategy on the intricacies of socialist theory." Later that year, he criticised Wood as not understanding how important Brexit was, and endorsed Adam Price in the ensuing 2018 Plaid Cymru leadership election. In March 2019, Edwards voted for an amendment tabled by members of The Independent Group calling for a second public vote on EU membership.

Edwards was re-elected in the 2019 United Kingdom general election with 38.9% of the vote.

=== Arrest ===
He was arrested on suspicion of assault on 20 May 2020, and suspended from the Plaid Cymru group during the police investigation, sitting as an independent. On 27 June, Edwards accepted a police caution for domestic violence against his wife and he was suspended from Plaid Cymru pending an investigation. He said he was "deeply sorry" and it was "the biggest regret" of his life; his wife Emma accepted his apology. Conservative MP for Brecon and Radnorshire, Fay Jones said Plaid had been too slow to respond, had failed to act and she believed that Plaid had "turn(ed) a blind eye" on the issue. On 15 July 2020, Edwards was officially suspended from the party for 12 months after the disciplinary panel concluded its internal investigation. Alun Ffred Jones, the chairman of Plaid Cymru, said: "All forms of harassment, abuse and violence are unacceptable, and this has been reflected in the verdict." Edwards was told that if he wished to rejoin the party, he would have to face the panel again to show that he has reflected and learnt from his actions.

One year after the suspension, Edwards remained an independent MP. Speaking to the South Wales Guardian, he confirmed that he had not applied to re-join the party and was yet to make any final decision about his future. He said: "It's really easy to make hasty decisions about my career and I don't want to rush into anything at the moment. I have missed being part of the Plaid group and my parliamentary colleagues are great friends, but being an independent MP gives you a lot of flexibility. I have really enjoyed working to my own timetable and it could be three years until the next general election, so I'm going to take that time to work through some things before making a final decision."

On 25 February 2022, he called the Russian invasion of Ukraine "a despicable act of imperialism that can't be defended on any count".

=== Readmission ===
In a May 2022 op-ed in The National Wales, former Plaid leader Leanne Wood claimed that if the party was "serious about stamping out misogyny and domestic abuse, there can be no way back for [Edwards]". Edwards was readmitted to Plaid Cymru in July 2022, after being suspended for two years. A statement from the panel of the membership, discipline and standards committee read: "The same panel which imposed Jonathan Edwards' 12-month suspension in July 2020 has now reconvened at Mr Edwards' request. The panel unanimously agreed that the suspension of Mr Edwards' party membership should be lifted with immediate effect. In arriving at its decision, the panel agreed that Jonathan Edwards had satisfied the conditions placed upon him at the point of his suspension. The suspension imposed in July 2020 reflected the seriousness with which the panel dealt with the matter and reinforced its unequivocal stance that all forms of harassment, abuse and violence are unacceptable." Alun Ffred Jones quit as head of Plaid's NEC in protest at the NEC's recommendation that Edwards should remain an independent MP despite re-joining the party. His wife Emma Edwards told BBC Cymru Wales that she was "appalled" by Plaid's decision and claimed it would send out the message "that survivors of domestic abuse don't matter". On 13 August, Edwards announced he would not be rejoining the party group at Westminster.

In January 2023 Edwards claimed there was a "groundswell of support" in his constituency for him to stand for re-election come the next UK General Election. "Part of the process of deciding what to do is the support I am receiving locally, and there is a lot of support from individuals locally," he told BBC Wales.

On 28 May 2024, he announced he would stand down at the 2024 United Kingdom general election.

== Personal life ==
Edwards lives in Ammanford in Carmarthenshire. He has three children.

He was arrested on suspicion of assaulting his wife Emma in May 2020. As of January 2023, they had reportedly divorced.

Parliament of the United Kingdom
Preceded by Adam Price	Member of Parliament for Carmarthen East and Dinefwr; 2010–2024	Constituency abolished
