= Plaid Cymru =

Welsh nationalist political party

Plaid Cymru – the Party of Wales
- Leader: Rhun ap Iorwerth
- Deputy Leader: Delyth Jewell
- Westminster Leader: Liz Saville Roberts
- Chair: Karl Davies
- Honorary President: The Lord Wigley
- Founded: 5 August 1925; 101 years ago
- Headquarters: Tŷ Gwynfor; Marine Chambers; Anson Court; Atlantic Wharf; Cardiff; CF10 4AL
- Youth wing: Plaid Ifanc
- LGBTQ wing: Plaid Pride
- Disability wing: Plaid Anabledd
- Membership (2022): c.10,000
- Ideology: Welsh nationalism; Welsh independence; Social democracy
- Political position: Centre-left to left-wing
- European affiliation: European Free Alliance
- Colours: Green (primary); Yellow (secondary); Red (secondary)
- House of Commons: 4 / 32 (Welsh seats)
- House of Lords: 2 / 796
- Senedd: 44 / 96
- Councillors in Wales: 203 / 1,234
- Councils led In Wales: 4 / 22
- Police and crime commissioners in Wales: 1 / 4

Website
- plaid.cymru (Welsh) partyof.wales (English)

Plaid Cymru (English: /plaɪd ˈkʌmri/ plyde KUM-ree; Welsh: [plaid ˈkəmrɨ̞]; lit. 'Party of Wales', officially Plaid Cymru – the Party of Wales, and often referred to simply as Plaid) is a centre-left to left-wing Welsh nationalist political party in Wales, that supports Welsh independence from the United Kingdom. It campaigns on a platform of social democracy and civic nationalism. The party is a supporter of the European Union and is a member of the European Free Alliance (EFA). The party holds 4 of 32 Welsh seats in the UK House of Commons, 44 of 96 seats in the Senedd, and 200 of 1,234 principal local authority councillors. It is currently leading a minority government in Wales. Plaid was formed in 1925 under the name Plaid Genedlaethol Cymru ('the national party of Wales') and Gwynfor Evans won the first Westminster seat for the party at the 1966 Carmarthen by-election.

In 1999 (in the first devolved Welsh Assembly election), Plaid Cymru gained considerable ground in traditionally Labour heartlands. These breakthroughs were part of the intentional aim to win more seats in the Welsh valleys and North East Wales. The party have mostly been in opposition in the Senedd. Although under the leadership of Ieuan Wyn Jones, the party was part of a coalition as a junior partner with Welsh Labour between 2007 and 2011. Wyn Jones became the deputy First Minister and Minister for the Economy and Transport, alongside other Plaid MSs who also joined the cabinet.

After losses in the 2011 Assembly elections and dropping down to being the third largest party, Wyn Jones stepped down. He was succeeded by Leanne Wood. In the 2016 Assembly elections Wood managed to win her constituency seat of Rhondda meaning the party gained one seat, and became the official opposition once again, although only for a brief period. In 2018 following internal pressure and a leadership contest, Adam Price defeated Wood and was elected the new leader. Following the 2021 Senedd election Plaid formed a co-operation agreement with the Welsh Labour government. In May 2023 Price resigned as leader following the publication of a report which detailed failings by the party to prevent sexual harassment and bullying. In June 2023 Rhun ap Iorwerth was elected unopposed as leader. The party won both its target seats in the 2024 general election, therefore becoming the second largest party representing Wales in the House of Commons.

Plaid Cymru won a plurality in the 2026 Senedd election with 43 out of 96 seats, and have formed the current Welsh government, with Rhun ap Iorwerth becoming the first Plaid Cymru First Minister.

== Ideology ==
Plaid Cymru is a centre-left to left-wing party that heavily emphasises its Welsh character, having been described as regionalist, civic nationalist, left-wing nationalist, Welsh nationalist, and pro-independence.

Economically, the party gradually adopted a socialist line and welcomed a number of socialists since its founding, but formalised its goal of "decentralized socialism" only in 1981. The party has been described as democratic socialist and left-wing, and later as social democratic and centre-left, but in recent years the former party leader Leanne Wood has described herself as a socialist and the party has gradually been re-conceived as left-wing and also left-wing populist.

The party has been described as environmentalist, and opposes new nuclear power plants and nuclear weapons (including the UK's Trident nuclear weapons programme).

In May 2025, the party's leader, Rhun ap Iorwerth, stated there was no plan for an independence referendum in the first term of a Plaid Cymru government if they are elected at the 2026 Senedd election, and that talk of a referendum would not take place before 2030. However, the party continues to hold an official position favouring Welsh independence. At the party's October 2025 conference, the party's members backed a motion to establish a "standing commission" to develop a white paper on Welsh independence. However, leader Rhun ap Iorwerth has stated that the white paper would not be for Plaid's first term of government if they were elected, although the commission may still collect evidence for the white paper during a Plaid first term. A date was not given but it is suggested they may develop plans if Plaid win both the 2026 and 2030 Senedd elections. Ap Iorweth stated they aim to "kick start the national debate on independence", "take the discussion forward" and "call the referendum when the time is right", with members backing a statement that Wales was "on a journey to independence".

== History ==
=== Beginnings ===
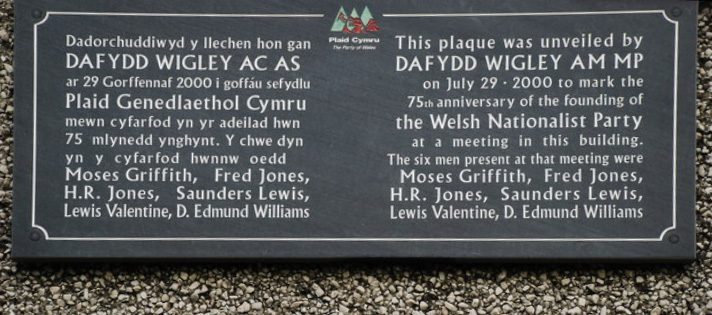
Plaque commemorating the founding of Plaid Cymru, Pwllheli

While both the Labour and Liberal parties of the early 20th century had accommodated demands for Welsh home rule, no political party existed for the purpose of establishing a Welsh government. Plaid Genedlaethol Cymru (Welsh for 'the National Party of Wales') was formed on 5 August 1925, by Moses Gruffydd, H. R. Jones and Lewis Valentine, members of Byddin Ymreolwyr Cymru (Welsh for 'the Home Rule Army of Wales'; lit. 'the Self-Rulers' Army of Wales'); and Fred Jones, Saunders Lewis of Y Mudiad Cymreig (Welsh for 'the Welsh Movement') and D. Edmund Williams. Initially, home rule for Wales was not an explicit aim of the new movement; keeping Wales Welsh-speaking took primacy, with the aim of making Welsh the only official language of Wales.

Plaid Genedlaethol Cymru's principles (translated from Welsh), as of 1925, were as followed: "(to) Have a Welsh Wales, That includes;", "To preserve the Welsh language as the only living language of Wales, and to restore it as the official language in public life and administration throughout Wales", "To secure for the Welsh language a central place in the educational system of Wales, from elementary school to university", they outlined that they wanted Wales to be "a self-governing nation" and they would do so by having "Control over Welsh affairs through a national parliament elected by the people", "Representation in the League of Nations and the right to determine its own relationships as a member nation among the nations of the world", "Freedom from English political domination", have "Control over all local resources within Wales".

In the 1929 general election, the party contested its first parliamentary constituency, Caernarvonshire, polling 609 votes, or 1.6% of the vote for that seat. The party contested few such elections in its early years, partly due to its ambivalence towards Westminster politics. Indeed, the candidate Lewis Valentine, the party's first president, offered himself in Caernarvonshire on a platform of demonstrating Welsh people's rejection of English dominion.

=== 1930s ===
By 1932, the aims of self-government and Welsh representation at the League of Nations had been added to that of preserving Welsh language and culture. However, this move, and the party's early attempts to develop an economic critique, did not broaden its appeal beyond that of an intellectual and socially conservative Welsh language pressure group. The alleged sympathy of the party's leading members (including President Saunders Lewis) towards Europe's totalitarian regimes compromised its early appeal further.

Saunders Lewis, David John Williams and Lewis Valentine set fire to the newly constructed RAF Penyberth air base on the Llŷn Peninsula in Gwynedd in 1936, in protest at its siting in the Welsh-speaking heartland. The leaders' treatment, including the trial judge's dismissal of the use of Welsh and their subsequent imprisonment in Wormwood Scrubs, led to "The Three" becoming a cause célèbre. This heightened the profile of the party dramatically and its membership had doubled to nearly 2,000 by 1939.

=== 1940s ===
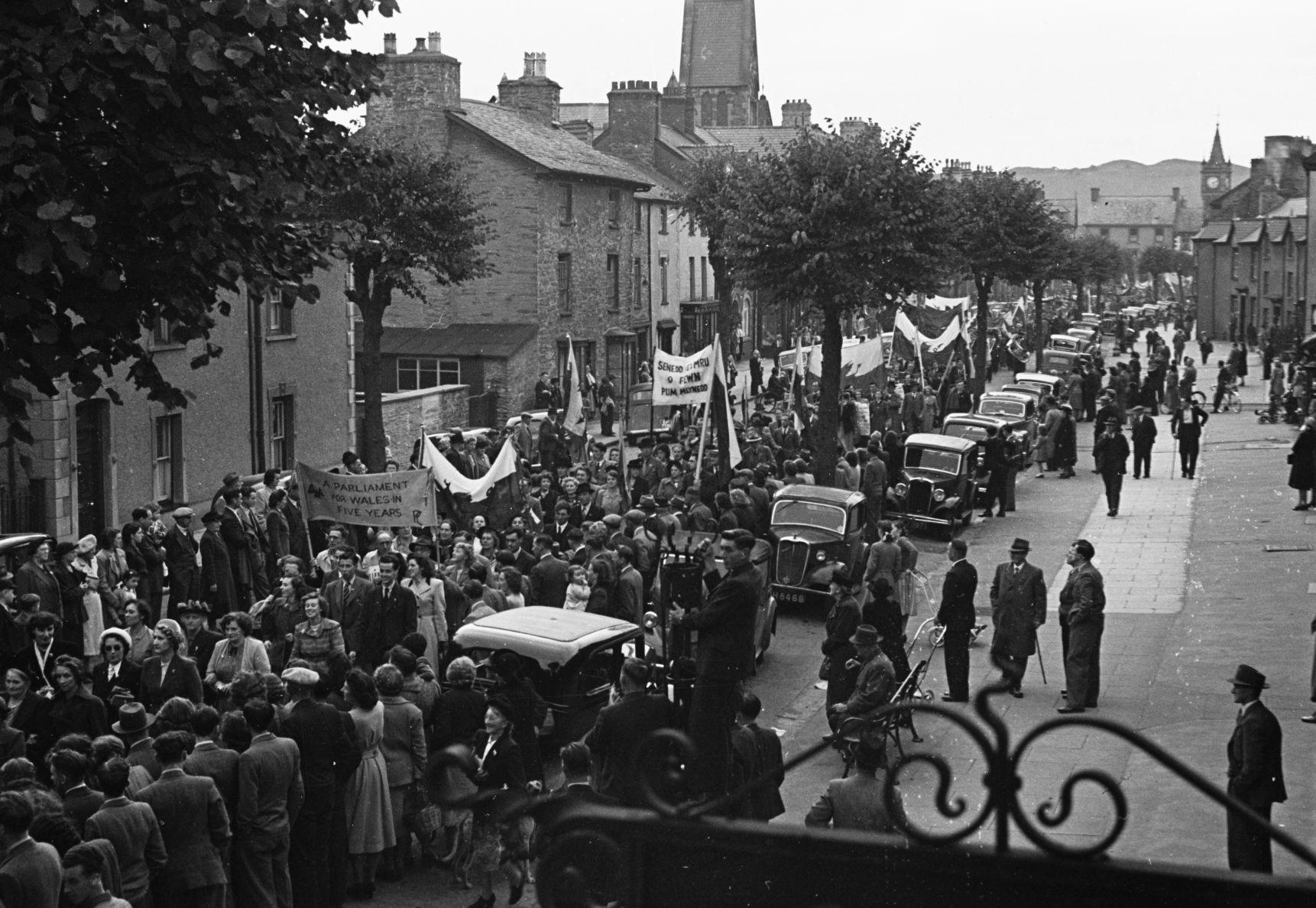
A Plaid Cymru rally in Machynlleth in 1949

Penyberth, and Plaid Cymru's neutral stance during the Second World War, prompted concerns within the UK Government that it might be used by Germany to insert spies or carry out other covert operations. In fact, the party adopted a neutral standpoint and urged (with only limited success) conscientious objection to war service.

In 1943, Saunders Lewis contested the University of Wales parliamentary seat at a by-election, gaining 1,330 votes, or 22%. In the 1945 general election, with party membership at around 2,500, Plaid Cymru contested seven seats, as many as it had in the preceding 20 years, including constituencies in south Wales for the first time. At this time Gwynfor Evans was elected president.

At the party’s 1949 conference in Dyffryn Ardudwy, the Cardiff branch proposed changing Plaid Cymru’s objective from “Dominion Status within the British Commonwealth” to “an Independent Republic”. The motion was defeated and a number of republican members left the party to found the Welsh Republican Movement.

=== 1950s ===
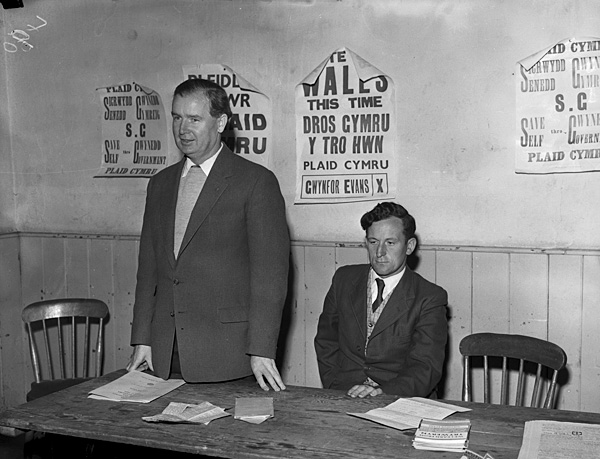
1959 election in Merioneth. Gwynfor Evans, standing, is talking at Bryncrug

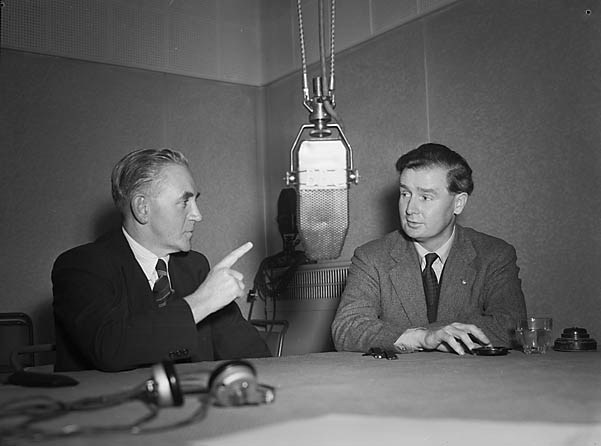
BBC debate between Iorwerth Thomas (Rhondda MP - Labour) and Gwynfor Evans, Plaid Cymru's first MP

Gwynfor Evans's presidency coincided with the maturation of Plaid Cymru (as it now began to refer to itself) into a more recognisable political party. Its share of the vote increased from 0.7% in the 1951 general election to 3.1% in 1955 and 5.2% in 1959. In the 1959 election, the party contested a majority of Welsh seats for the first time. Proposals to flood the village of Capel Celyn in the Tryweryn valley in Gwynedd in 1957 to supply the city of Liverpool with water played a part in Plaid Cymru's growth. The fact that the parliamentary bill authorising the dam went through without support from any Welsh MPs showed that the MPs' votes in Westminster were not enough to prevent such bills from passing.

=== 1960s ===
Support for the party declined slightly in the early 1960s, particularly as support for the Liberal Party began to stabilise from its long-term decline. In 1962, Saunders Lewis gave a radio talk entitled Tynged yr Iaith ('the fate of the language') in which he predicted the extinction of the Welsh language unless action was taken. This led to the formation of Cymdeithas yr Iaith Gymraeg ('the Welsh Language Society') the same year.

Labour's return to power in 1964 and the creation of the post of Secretary of State for Wales appeared to represent a continuation of the incremental evolution of a distinctive Welsh polity, following the Conservative government's appointment of a Minister of Welsh Affairs in 1951 and the establishment of Cardiff as Wales's capital in 1955.

However, in 1966, less than four months after coming in third in the constituency of Carmarthen, Gwynfor Evans captured the seat from Labour at a by-election. This was followed by two further by-elections in Rhondda West in 1967 and Caerphilly in 1968 in which the party achieved massive swings of 30% and 40% respectively, coming within a whisker of victory. The results were caused partly by an anti-Labour backlash. Expectations in coal mining communities that the Wilson government would halt the long-term decline in their industry had been dashed by a significant downward revision of coal production estimates. However, particularly in Carmarthen, Plaid also successfully depicted Labour's policies as a threat to the viability of small Welsh communities.

=== 1970s ===
In the 1970 general election, Plaid Cymru contested every seat in Wales for the first time and its vote share surged from 4.5% in 1966 to 11.5%. Gwynfor Evans lost Carmarthen to Labour, but regained the seat in October 1974, by which time the party had gained a further two MPs, representing the constituencies of Caernarfon and Merionethshire.

Plaid Cymru's emergence (along with the Scottish National Party) prompted the Wilson government to establish the Kilbrandon Commission on the constitution. The subsequent proposals for a Welsh Assembly were, however, heavily defeated in a referendum in 1979. Despite Plaid Cymru's ambivalence toward home rule (as opposed to outright independence) the referendum result led some in the party to question its direction.

Plaid campaigned to leave the Common Market in the 1975 referendum, feeling that the EC's regional aid policies would "reconcile places like Wales to their subordinate position". Nevertheless, 65% of Welsh voters voted to remain in the EC during a 1975 referendum. The EC was incorporated into the European Union (EU) in 1993.

At the 1979 general election, the party's vote share declined from 10.8% to 8.1% and Carmarthen was again lost to Labour, although Caernarfon and Merionethshire were held by the party.

=== 1980s ===
Caernarfon MP Dafydd Wigley succeeded Gwynfor Evans as president in 1981, inheriting a party whose morale was at an all-time low. In 1981 the party adopted a policy of "community socialism". While the party embarked on a wide-ranging review of its priorities and goals, Gwynfor Evans fought a successful campaign (including the threat of a hunger strike) to oblige the Conservative government to fulfill its promise to establish S4C, a Welsh-language television station. In 1984, Dafydd Elis-Thomas was elected president, defeating Dafydd Iwan, a move that saw the party shift to the left. Ieuan Wyn Jones (later Plaid Cymru leader) captured Ynys Môn from the Conservatives in 1987. In 1989 Dafydd Wigley once again assumed the presidency of the party.

In 1986, the party established Undeb Credyd Plaid Cymru Credit Union Limited, a savings and loans co-operative based in Roath, Cardiff, open to party members. The credit union closed in the late 2010s and was deregistered in 2023.

=== 1990s ===
In the 1992 general election, the party added a fourth MP, Cynog Dafis, when he gained Ceredigion and Pembroke North from the Liberal Democrats. Dafis was endorsed by the local branch of the Green Party. The party's vote share recovered to 9.9% at the 1997 general election.

In 1997, following the election of a Labour government committed to devolution for Wales, a further referendum was narrowly won, establishing the National Assembly for Wales. Plaid Cymru became the main opposition to the ruling Labour Party, with 17 seats to Labour's 28. In doing so, it appeared to have broken out of its rural Welsh-speaking heartland, and gained seats in traditionally strong Labour areas in industrial South Wales.

Ahead of the 1999 National Assembly for Wales election, Plaid Cymru dropped its policy of Welsh independence in favour of continued membership in the European Union. These changes in policy were made as it was believed that the electorate in Wales did not view independence as an important issue. It also adopted social democracy for its economic policy in an attempt to weaken Labour. These changes in policy have been used to explain the party's subsequent electoral success in Labour's traditional South East Wales heartlands.

=== Assembly/Senedd era ===
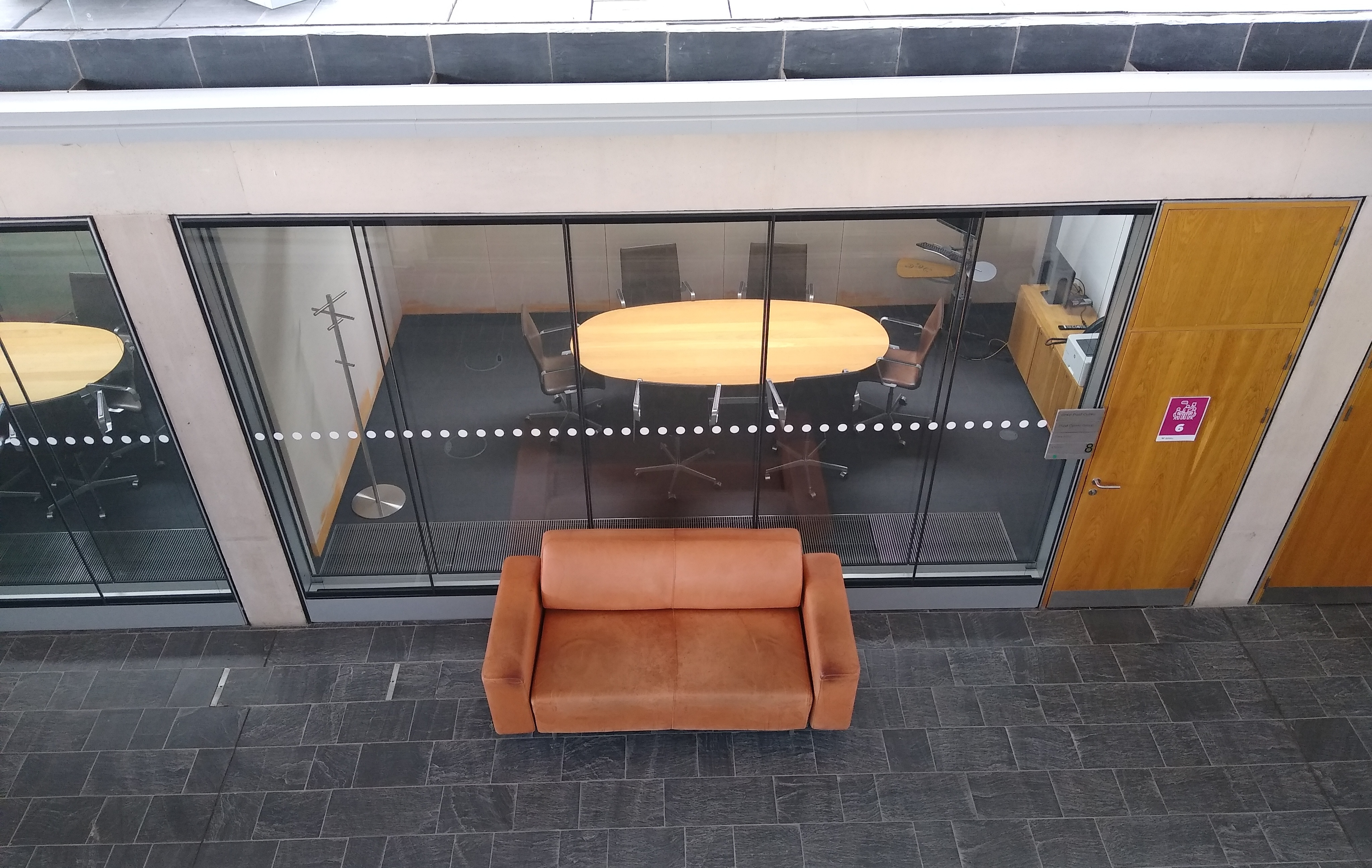
Plaid Cymru Group office in the Senedd building

==== First National Assembly (1999–2003) ====
In the 1999 election, Plaid Cymru gained seats in traditional Labour areas such as Rhondda, Islwyn and Llanelli, achieving by far its highest share of the vote in any Wales-wide election until the 2026 Senedd election While Plaid Cymru regarded itself as the natural beneficiary of devolution, others attributed its performance in large part to the travails of the Labour Party, whose nomination for Assembly First Secretary, Ron Davies, was forced to stand down in an alleged sex scandal. The ensuing leadership battle, won by Alun Michael, did much to damage Labour, and thus aided Plaid Cymru, whose leader was the more popular and higher profile Dafydd Wigley. The Labour Party's UK national leadership was seen to interfere in the contest and deny the popular Rhodri Morgan victory. Less than two months later, in elections to the European parliament, Labour support slumped further, and Plaid Cymru came within 2.5% of achieving the largest share of the vote in Wales. Under the new system of proportional representation, the party also gained two MEPs.

Plaid Cymru then developed political problems of its own. Dafydd Wigley resigned, citing health problems but amid rumours of a plot against him. His successor, Ieuan Wyn Jones, struggled to impose his authority, particularly over controversial remarks made by a councillor, Seimon Glyn. At the same time, Labour leader and First Minister Alun Michael was replaced by Rhodri Morgan.

In the 2001 general election, notwithstanding Plaid Cymru recording its highest-ever vote share in a general election, 14.3%, the party lost Wyn Jones's former seat of Ynys Môn to Albert Owen, although it gained Carmarthen East and Dinefwr, where Adam Price was elected.

==== Second National Assembly (2003–07) ====
The Assembly elections of May 2003 saw the party's representation drop from 17 to 12, with the seats gained in the 1999 election falling again to Labour and the party's share of the vote declining to 21%. Plaid Cymru narrowly remained the second-largest party in the National Assembly ahead of the Conservatives, Liberal Democrats and a single independent.

On 15 September 2003, folk-singer and county councillor Dafydd Iwan was elected as Plaid Cymru's president. Ieuan Wyn Jones, who had resigned from his dual role as president and Assembly group leader following the losses in the 2003 Assembly election, was re-elected in the latter role. Elfyn Llwyd remained the Plaid Cymru leader in the Westminster Parliament. Under Iwan's presidency, the party formally adopted a policy of independence for Wales within Europe at its conference in September 2003. Plaid Cymru had historically supported Welsh independence but dropped this policy ahead of the 1999 devolved election.

The 2004 local election saw the party lose control of the two South Wales councils it gained in 1999, Rhondda Cynon Taff and Caerphilly, while retaining its stronghold of Gwynedd in the north-west. The results enabled the party to claim a greater number of ethnic minority councillors than all the other political parties in Wales combined, along with gains in authorities such as Cardiff and Swansea, where Plaid Cymru representation had been minimal. In the European Parliament elections of the same year, the party's vote share fell to 17.4%, and the reduction in the number of Welsh MEPs saw its representation reduced to one.

Old logo (above) and new logo (below)

In the general election of 5 May 2005, Plaid Cymru lost the Ceredigion seat to the Liberal Democrats; this result was a disappointment to Plaid, who had hoped to gain Ynys Môn. Overall therefore, Plaid Cymru's Parliamentary representation fell to three seats, the lowest number for the party since 1992. The party's share of the vote fell to 12.6%.

Since Plaid Genedlaethol Cymru reformation to 'Plaid Cymru' in 1933, the logo representing the party was the green 'triban' (three peaks) which symbolically represented Plaid's three key goals; self-government, cultural prosperity and economic prosperity, 'anchored in the bedrock of Welsh identity and history that is the Welsh upland landscape', the logo would change in the late stages of 20th century to include the red dragon of Wales, however this version was short-lived. In 2006, the party voted constitutional changes to formally designate the party's leader in the assembly as its overall leader, with Ieuan Wyn Jones being restored to the full leadership and Dafydd Iwan becoming head of the voluntary wing of the party. The party unveiled a radical change of image in 2006. In that year, the party opted to use "Plaid" as the party's name, although "Plaid Cymru — the Party of Wales" would remain the official title. Plaid would abandon the triban (apart from the merchandise) and adopt the yellow Welsh poppy (Meconopsis cambrica).

==== Third National Assembly (2007–2011) ====
In the National Assembly election of 3 May 2007, Plaid Cymru increased its number of seats from 12 to 15, regaining Llanelli, gaining one additional list seat and winning the newly created constituency of Aberconwy. The 2007 election also saw Plaid Cymru's Mohammad Asghar become the first ethnic minority candidate elected to the Welsh Assembly. The party's share of the vote increased to 22.4%.

After weeks of negotiations involving all four parties in the Assembly, Plaid Cymru and Labour agreed to form a coalition government. Their agreed "One Wales" programme included a commitment for both parties to campaign for a Yes vote in a referendum on full law-making powers for the Assembly, to be held at a time of the Welsh Assembly Government's choosing. Ieuan Wyn Jones was subsequently confirmed as Deputy First Minister of Wales and Minister for the Economy and Transport. Rhodri Glyn Thomas was appointed Heritage Minister. He later stood down, and Alun Ffred Jones took over. Ceredigion AM Elin Jones was appointed to the Rural Affairs brief in the new 10-member cabinet. Jocelyn Davies became Deputy Minister for Housing and Regeneration.

In the 2010 general election, Plaid returned three MPs to Westminster. They took part in the Yes for Wales cross-party campaign for the March 2011 referendum.

==== Fourth National Assembly (2011–16) ====
In the 2011 National Assembly election, Plaid slipped from second place to third, being overtaken by the Welsh Conservatives and losing its deputy leader Helen Mary Jones. The party held an inquiry into the election result. The internal investigation led to the adoption of wide-ranging changes to its constitution, including a streamlining of the leadership structure.

In May 2011, Ieuan Wyn Jones announced he would stand down as leader within the first half of the Assembly term. A leadership election was held in which three candidates eventually stood: Elin Jones, Dafydd Elis-Thomas and Leanne Wood; Simon Thomas withdrew his candidacy before ballots were cast.

On 15 March 2012, Plaid Cymru elected Leanne Wood as its new leader. She received 55% of the vote, over second-placed Elin Jones with 41%. Wood was the party's first female leader, and its first not to be a fluent Welsh speaker. Soon after her election as leader, she appointed former MP Adam Price to head an economic commission for the party "focussed on bringing together tailor-made policies in order to transform our economy". On 1 May 2012, it was confirmed Leanne Wood would not be taking the £23,000 pay increase that every other party leader in the Assembly receives.

On 12 November 2012, Wood announced she would aim to abandon her relatively safe list seat by winning a constituency at the 2016 National Assembly elections; she later confirmed she would contest the Rhondda. Adam Price was subsequently selected as the party's candidate for Carmarthen East and Dinefwr. Lindsay Whittle confirmed he would stand solely in Caerphilly.

On 20 June 2013, former party leader Ieuan Wyn Jones stood down from the Assembly as the member for Ynys Môn. Plaid Cymru's candidate Rhun ap Iorwerth was elected as the new Assembly Member for the constituency, receiving 12,601 votes (a 58% share) with a majority of 9,166 over the Labour candidate.

==== Fifth National Assembly/Senedd (2016–2021) ====
At the 2016 Welsh Assembly elections, Plaid Cymru gained one seat, Rhondda from Labour, on what was an otherwise disappointing night, and became the Assembly's second-largest party and briefly became the official opposition to the Welsh Government with 12 seats. By January 2018 Plaid Cymru had been reduced to ten Assembly Members, following the resignation of Dafydd Elis-Thomas in 2016 and the permanent expulsion of Neil McEvoy from Plaid's Assembly group in 2018.

Despite campaigning to leave in 1975, Plaid campaigned for a Remain vote in the 2016 referendum on the UK's membership of the EU, spending £27,495 on the campaign. In the referendum Wales voted 52.5% in favour of Leave. Immediately after the referendum, Leanne Wood stated that voters 'must be respected' and criticised calls for a second EU referendum. Plaid Cymru later modified their policy to support a People's Vote.

In the 2017 United Kingdom general election, Plaid saw their popular vote fall, but narrowly gained Ceredigion and saw Arfon become highly marginal.

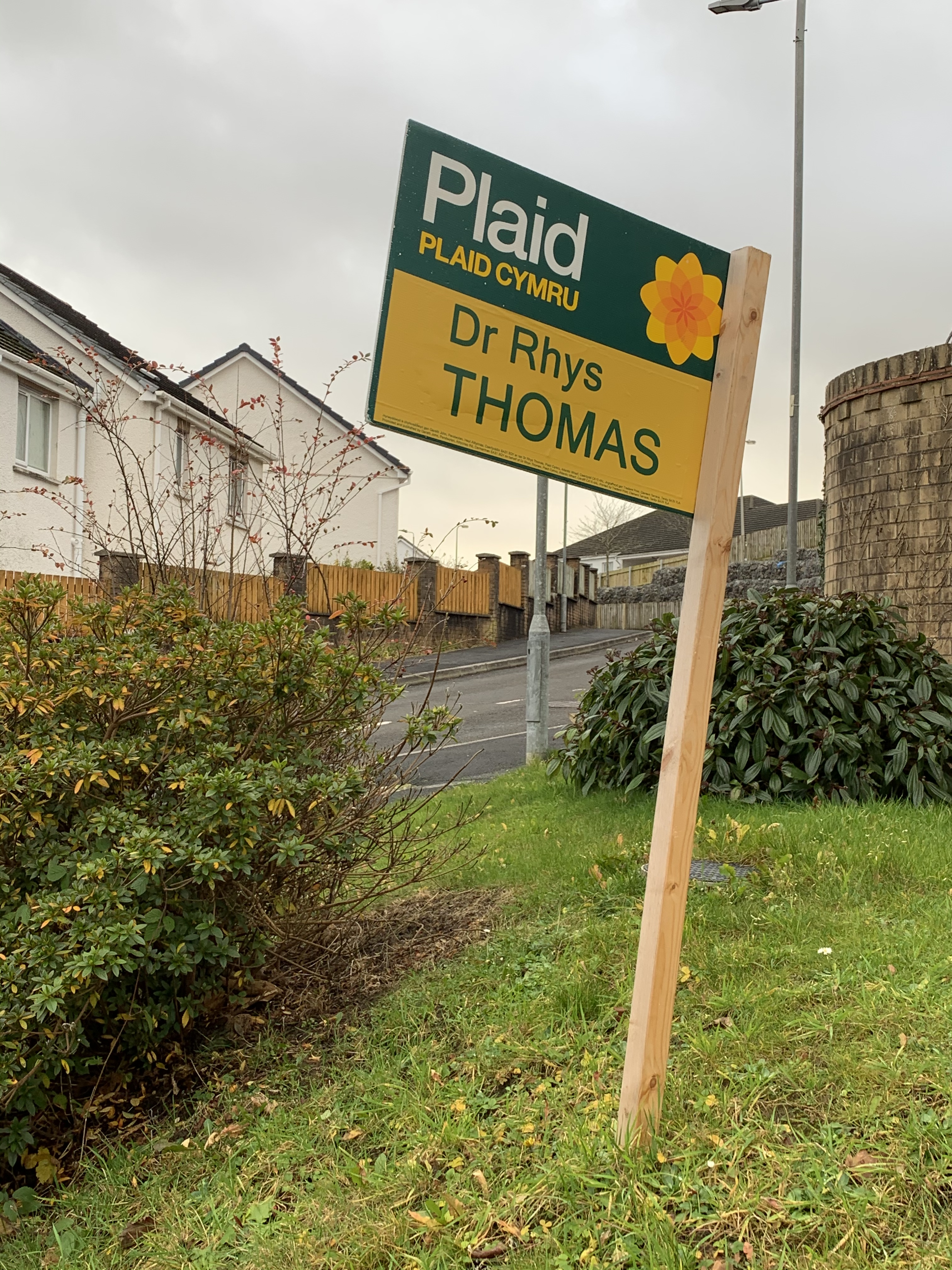
A campaign board for a Plaid Cymru election candidate in 2019

In September 2018, Adam Price won the party's leadership election, defeating the incumbent Leanne Wood and fellow challenger Rhun ap Iorwerth. In October 2018, it was regarded as left-wing populist by Massetti Emmanuel in the Comparative European Politics academic journal.

In the Brecon and Radnorshire by-election Plaid Cymru decided not to put up a candidate, but instead to support the Liberal Democrat candidate Jane Dodds in order to maximise the chance of an anti-Brexit candidate winning.

In the 2019 United Kingdom general election, Plaid stood aside in four seats to endorse Unite to Remain candidates. Plaid held their four seats but saw a decrease in their popular vote. Also ahead of the election, Price announced the creation of an independence commission, led by former Dwyfor Meirionydd MP Elfyn Llwyd, to examine the practicality of Welsh independence and how a referendum might be held. The commission published its report in September 2020, recommending that an independent Wales seek EU membership, explore a confederal relationship with England and Scotland, and hold an initial multi-option referendum to gauge public opinion. The report was criticised by the Welsh Liberal Democrats as a mix of "fanatical politics" and "pie in the sky economics". In December 2020, Price pledged that a Plaid government would hold an independence referendum in its first term if the party won a majority at the 2021 Senedd election.

==== Sixth Senedd (2021–2026) ====
In the run-up to the 2021 Senedd election, polling suggested that Welsh Labour would win the highest number of seats but fall short of an overall majority. Pollsters and commentators suggested that the most likely outcome would be another Labour–Plaid Cymru coalition, an option First Minister Mark Drakeford said he would be open to. Price insisted that his party would not be Labour's "junior partner", nor would they work with the Conservatives under any circumstances. He stated that Plaid would be willing to join forces with Labour, but only if the former were the largest party or if it were an equal partnership. Price also said that he did not consider Welsh independence to be "a distraction or a constitutional abstraction", but rather "a practical necessity".

At the election, Plaid increased their seat total to thirteen, up one from the twelve they won in 2016, but lost out in their target constituencies, and lost Rhondda where former leader Leanne Wood lost her seat to Labour. Price said he would not resign, telling ITV Wales: "My job is to lead, its not to give up at a set back or disappointment. My job is to sustain the hope – all those young people who voted for Plaid because they were inspired by our message of the potential we believe is there in Wales to deliver a decent society for our people. I firmly believe that we have sown a lot of seed at this election. A lot of young people in particular who did come with us this time has laid the foundations for the future which I think will set us up for growth in the years to come."

On 22 November 2021, despite Price's earlier comments about refusing to work with Labour, the two parties announced a co-operation agreement consisting of almost 50 different policies, including providing free school meals for all primary school children, the establishment of a free-at-point-of-need national care system and building a railway between North and South Wales. Price called the agreement "a down-payment on independence" and claimed that the results of the Senedd election "confirmed Wales's status as an indy-curious nation. A curiosity that will give birth – sooner than many think – to an independent Wales." He went on to say, "For Wales to be free, we must first be united. And, that is what this Co-operation Agreement sets out to achieve. It launches us on a pathway to a united Wales, one that, sooner than we perhaps think, will find it both comfortable and natural, indeed essential, to join the world community of normal, independent nations."

The co-operation agreement was ratified by Plaid's conference, with 94% voting in favour. "This is a huge step forward for Wales and our democracy," Price said. "The co-operation agreement will bring immediate, tangible and long-term benefit for the people of Wales. All primary school children will now receive free school meals; there will be free childcare for all two-year-olds; and radical action to tackle the housing crisis. There will be stability payments to support family farms; exploration of an accelerated pathway to net zero by 2035; the creation of Ynni Cymru – a company to expand community-owned renewable energy generation; and a new and reformed Senedd – bigger, more diverse, and gender balanced in law. From feeding our children to caring for our elderly, this is a nation-building Programme for Government which will change the lives of thousands of people the length and breadth of our country for the better. And none of it would be happening without Plaid Cymru."

In May 2023, the publication of a report which detailed failings by the party to prevent sexual harassment and bullying led to media coverage suggesting that Price had agreed to resign the party leadership, and Price confirmed this in a statement on 10 May. Acknowledging that he "no longer had the united support of [his] colleagues", Price stated that he would step down officially at the start of the following week, once the process for electing a new interim leader was finalised. On 11 May Plaid Cymru announced that Llyr Gruffydd, Senedd member for North Wales, would replace him as interim party leader, and that this would be confirmed by the NEC on 13 May. On 16 June 2023 Rhun ap Iorwerth was announced as the new permanent leader after he was elected unopposed.

At party conference in Aberystwyth in October 2023, Rhun ap Iorwerth said the party was "not just for Welsh speakers". Accomplishments like free school meals with the Drakeford government were promoted.

In the 2024 UK general election Plaid Cymru managed to get its best percentage of the vote share in Wales for a General Election and win two of its targets seats in Caerfyrddin and Ynys Môn. On 23 October 2025 Plaid Cymru won the Caerphilly by-election, Laura McAllister suggested that the by-election was a sign of the 'fundamental realignment of Welsh politics' and that Labour could soon lose its 'hegemony' in Wales.

Opinion polls before the next Senedd election in 2026 suggested Plaid Cymru winning the most number of seats. Rhun ap Iorwerth in December 2025 suggested that Plaid was the local equivalent of Zohran Mamdani, and a viable alternative to Welsh Labour.

==== Seventh Senedd (2026–) ====
Plaid Cymru had their best result in the 2026 Senedd election, winning 43 of the 96 seats and 35.4% of the vote. They went on to form the Welsh Government as a minority government, with Rhun ap Iorwerth as the first Plaid Cymru First Minister.

On 14 September 2026 Rhun ap Iorwerth the leader of Plaid Cymru signed the Cardiff Agreement alongside the John Swinney leader of the Scottish National Party (SNP) and Michelle O’Neill and Mary Lou McDonald the Vice President and President of Sinn Féin setting out a shared commitment to independence from the United Kingdom for Wales and Scotland, alongside reunification for Northern Ireland with the Republic of Ireland.

== Party leadership ==
Name and portrait	Party office	Constituency (if any)	Notes
Rhun ap Iorwerth	First Minister of Wales and Party Leader	MS for Bangor Conwy Môn	
Liz Saville Roberts	Westminster Group Leader	MP for Dwyfor Meirionydd	
Dafydd Wigley	Honorary Party President from 2001	Life peer	Former Party President Member of the House of Lords

=== Leaders ===
The party leader was referred to in English as the president until March 2000, when the separate role of Leader was created.

Party leaders
	Name	From	To
1	Lewis Valentine	1925	1926
2	Saunders Lewis	1926	1939
3	John Edward Daniel	1939	1943
4	Abi Williams	1943	1945
5	Gwynfor Evans	1 August 1945	1981
6	Dafydd Wigley	1981	1984
7	Dafydd Elis-Thomas	1984	1991
(6)	Dafydd Wigley	1991	4 August 2000
8	Ieuan Wyn Jones	4 August 2000	16 March 2012
9	Leanne Wood	16 March 2012	28 September 2018
10	Adam Price	28 September 2018	16 May 2023
-	Llyr Gruffydd (acting)	16 May 2023	16 June 2023
11	Rhun ap Iorwerth	16 June 2023	Incumbent

=== Deputy leaders ===
Deputy Leader	From	To
Rhodri Glyn Thomas	2003	2007
Alun Ffred Jones	2007	2008
Helen Mary Jones	2008	2012
Elin Jones	17 July 2012	2016
Vacant	2016	2018
Rhun ap Iorwerth & Siân Gwenllian	23 October 2018	27 June 2023
Delyth Jewell	27 June 2023	Present

=== Chief executives ===
Chief executive	From	To
Dafydd Trystan Davies	2002	2007
Gwenllian Lansdown	2007	2011
Rhuanedd Richards	2011	2016
Gareth Clubb	2016	2020
Marc Phillips	2020	2021
Carl Harris	2021	2022
Owen Roberts	2023	Incumbent

== Elected representatives ==
=== House of Commons ===
Name	Constituency	Since	Spokesperson role
Ann Davies	Caerfyrddin	2024	Department for Work and Pensions; Environment and Rural Affairs; Education; Transport; and Culture, Media, and Sport
Llinos Medi	Ynys Môn	2024	Department of Energy Security and Net Zero; Business and Trade; Housing, Communities and Local Government; Health; and Equalities
Ben Lake	Ceredigion Preseli (Ceredigion 2017-2024)	2017	Group Secretary and Treasurer, speaking for the group on the Treasury; Foreign and Commonwealth Office; and Science, Innovation and Technology
Liz Saville Roberts	Dwyfor Meirionnydd	2015	Wales Office; Ministry of Justice; Home Office; Cabinet Office; Attorney General's Office; and Ministry of Defence

=== Senedd ===
Name	Constituency	Role
Lyn Ackerman MS	Casnewydd Islwyn	N/A
Zaynub Akbar MS	Caerdydd Ffynnon Taf	N/A
Mabon ap Gwynfor MS	Gwynedd Maldwyn	Cabinet Minister for Health and Care
Rhun ap Iorwerth MS	Bangor Conwy Môn	First Minister of Wales
Beca Brown MS	Gwynedd Maldwyn	N/A
Anna Brychan MS	Caerdydd Penarth	Cabinet Minister for Education and the Welsh Language
Cefin Campbell MS	Sir Gaerfyrddin	Deputy Minister for Skills and Tertiary Education
Nick Carter MS	Caerdydd Ffynnon Taf	N/A
Alun Cox MS	Afan Ogwr Rhondda	N/A
Sara Crowley MS	Pontypridd Cynon Merthyr	N/A
Donna Cushing MS	Sir Fynwy Torfaen	N/A
John Davies MS	Gŵyr Abertawe	N/A
Safa Elhassan MS	Gŵyr Abertawe	N/A
Nerys Evans MS	Sir Gaerfyrddin	Deputy Minister for Public and Preventative Health
Sera Evans MS	Afan Ogwr Rhondda	N/A
Kerry Ferguson MS	Ceredigion Penfro	Dirprwy Lywydd
Heledd Fychan MS	Pontypridd Cynon Merthyr	Trefnydd, Chief Whip and Cabinet Minister for Culture and Sport
Leticia Gonzalez MS	Caerdydd Penarth	N/A
Llyr Gruffydd MS	Clwyd	Cabinet Minister for Rural Resilience and Sustainability
Siân Gwenllian MS	Gwynedd Maldwyn	Cabinet Minister for Local Government, Housing and Planning
Carrie Harper MS	Fflint Wrecsam	N/A
Mark Hooper MS	Pen-y-bont Bro Morgannwg	Deputy Minister for Transport
Delyth Jewell MS	Blaenau Gwent Caerffili Rhymni	Deputy Minister for Social Care, Mental Health and Women's Health
Elin Jones MS	Ceredigion Penfro	Cabinet Minister for Finance
Marc Jones MS	Fflint Wrecsam	N/A
Matthew Jones MS	Sir Fynwy Torfaen	N/A
Kiera Marshall MS	Caerdydd Penarth	N/A
Becca Martin MS	Clwyd	N/A
Lis McLean MS	Pontypridd Cynon Merthyr	N/A
Anna Nicholl MS	Ceredigion Penfro	N/A
Peredur Owen Griffiths MS	Casnewydd Islwyn	Commissioner
Rebeca Phillips MS	Brycheiniog Tawe Nedd	N/A
Adam Price MS	Sir Gaerfyrddin	Cabinet Minister for Enterprise, Connectivity and Energy
Sarah Rees MS	Pen-y-bont Bro Morgannwg	N/A
Mair Rowlands MS	Bangor Conwy Môn	N/A
Niamh Salkeld MS	Blaenau Gwent Caerffili Rhymni	N/A
Elyn Stephens MS	Afan Ogwr Rhondda	N/A
Dafydd Trystan Davies MS	Caerdydd Ffynnon Taf	Cabinet Minister for Government Effectiveness and the Constitution
Elwyn Vaughan MS	Gwynedd Maldwyn	N/A
Lindsay Whittle MS	Blaenau Gwent Caerffili Rhymni	N/A
Elfed Williams MS	Bangor Conwy Môn	N/A
Gwyn Williams MS	Gŵyr Abertawe	N/A
Sioned Williams MS	Brycheiniog Tawe Nedd	Deputy First Minister of Wales and Cabinet Minister for Social Justice and Equality

=== Local councillors ===
198 councillors in local government. They form the Plaid Cymru Councillors Association.

Plaid Cymru is involved in the administration of 7 out of 22 Welsh councils.

County Council	Plaid Cymru Seats	Total	Administration
Gwynedd	43	69	Plaid Cymru overall control
Ceredigion	21	38	Plaid Cymru overall control
Isle of Anglesey	19	35	Plaid Cymru overall control
Carmarthernshire	38	75	Plaid Cymru - Independents coalition
Neath Port Talbot	10	60	Plaid Cymru - Independents coalition
Denbighshire	7	48	Plaid Cymru - Labour coalition
Conwy	8	55	Plaid Cymru - Independents - Labour - Greens coalition

== Appointments ==
=== House of Lords ===
Name	Date Ennobled
Lord Wigley	24 January 2011
Baroness Smith of Llanfaes	13 March 2024

== Election results ==
=== House of Commons ===
Election	Leader	Wales			UK	+/–	Government
Election	Leader	Votes	%	Seats	%	+/–	Government
1929	Saunders Lewis	609	0.03	0 / 36	0.0		—N/a
1931	Saunders Lewis	2,050	0.2	0 / 36	0.0	Steady	—N/a
1935	Saunders Lewis	2,534	0.3	0 / 36	0.0	Steady	—N/a
1945	Abi Williams	16,017	1.2	0 / 36	0.1	Steady	—N/a
1950	Gwynfor Evans	17,580	1.2	0 / 36	0.1	Steady	—N/a
1951	Gwynfor Evans	10,920	0.7	0 / 36	0.0	Steady	—N/a
1955	Gwynfor Evans	45,119	3.1	0 / 36	0.2	Steady	—N/a
1959	Gwynfor Evans	77,571	5.2	0 / 36	0.3	Steady	—N/a
1964	Gwynfor Evans	69,507	4.8	0 / 36	0.3	Steady	—N/a
1966	Gwynfor Evans	61,071	4.3	0 / 36	0.2	Steady	—N/a
1970	Gwynfor Evans	175,016	11.5	0 / 36	0.6	Steady	—N/a
Feb 1974	Gwynfor Evans	171,374	10.8	2 / 36	0.5	▲2	Opposition
Oct 1974	Gwynfor Evans	166,321	10.8	3 / 36	0.6	▲1	Opposition
1979	Gwynfor Evans	132,544	8.1	2 / 36	0.4	▼1	Opposition
1983	Dafydd Wigley	125,309	7.8	2 / 38	0.4	Steady	Opposition
1987	Dafydd Elis-Thomas	123,599	7.3	3 / 38	0.4	▲1	Opposition
1992 (Note: Six seats (Blaenau Gwent, Ceredigion & Pembroke North, Islwyn, Monmouth, Newport West and Torfaen) contested on a joint Plaid Cymru/Green Party ticket)	Dafydd Wigley	156,796	9.0	4 / 38	0.5	▲1	Opposition
1997	Dafydd Wigley	161,030	9.9	4 / 40	0.5	Steady	Opposition
2001	Ieuan Wyn Jones	195,893	14.3	4 / 40	0.7	Steady	Opposition
2005	Ieuan Wyn Jones	174,838	12.6	3 / 40	0.6	▼1	Opposition
2010	Ieuan Wyn Jones	165,394	11.3	3 / 40	0.6	Steady	Opposition
2015	Leanne Wood	181,694	12.1	3 / 40	0.65	Steady	Opposition
2017	Leanne Wood	164,466	10.4	4 / 40	0.5	▲1	Opposition
2019	Adam Price	153,265	9.9	4 / 40	0.48	Steady	Opposition
2024	Rhun ap Iorwerth	194,811	14.8	4 / 32	0.68	Steady	Opposition

=== Senedd ===
Election	Constituency			Regional			Votes	%	Total seats	+/–	Government
Election	Votes	%	Seats	Votes	%	Seats	Votes	%	Total seats	+/–	Government
1999	290,572	28.4	9 / 40	312,048	30.6	8 / 20			17 / 60		Opposition
2003	180,185	21.2	5 / 40	167,653	19.7	7 / 20			12 / 60	▼5	Opposition
2007	219,121	22.4	7 / 40	204,757	21.0	8 / 20			15 / 60	▲3	Lab–Plaid
2011	182,907	19.3	5 / 40	169,799	17.9	6 / 20			11 / 60	▼4	Opposition
2016	209,376	20.5	6 / 40	211,548	20.8	6 / 20			12 / 60	▲1	Opposition
2021	225,376	20.3	5 / 40	230,161	20.7	8 / 20			13 / 60	▲1	Opposition
2026 (Note: Starting with the 2026 election, the Senedd was increased to 96 members who are all elected through closed list proportional representation (using the D'Hondt method) in sixteen six-member constituencies)							444,665	35.4	43 / 96	▲30	Minority

=== Local councils ===
Election	Votes	%	Councils	±	Seats	±
1995	115,900	12.5	1 / 8		202 / 1,272	
1999	179,212	18.2	3 / 22	▲2	205 / 1,270	▲3
2004	149,352	16.4	1 / 22	▼2	175 / 1,263	▼30
2008 (Note: In 2008, Plaid won 205 seats including six in Anglesey. For the purposes of this table the 205 figure has been reduced to 199 for the 2012 elections where the party lost 41 of the 199 seats it was defending on the night, leaving them with 158 seats.)	159,847	16.8	0 / 22	▼1	205 / 1,270	▲31
2012 (Note: The 2012 figures exclude Anglesey, where the vote was delayed until 2013. The changes in seats and votes shown for 2012 are a direct comparison since the 2008 elections in the 21 councils up for election (i.e. excluding Anglesey).) (Note: In the 2013 Isle of Anglesey County Council election, the party won 12 seats, up from the 6 it won in 2008 (although there were significant boundary changes and a reduction in the total number of seats from 40 to 30).)	133,961	15.8	0 / 22	Steady	158 / 1,235	▼41
2017 (Note: The 2017 figures are based on changes from the 2012 and 2013 elections. (Hence the slight discrepancy in the percentage increase.))	160,519	16.5	1 / 22	▲1	208 / 1,254	▲33
2022	160,284	16.9	4 / 22	▲3	202 / 1,231	▼6

=== Police and Crime Commissioners ===
Election	Wales			+/–
Election	First Pref Votes	%	Seats	+/–
2012	did not contest			
2016	228,334	23.7%	2 / 4	
2021	247,518	23.2%	1 / 4	▼1
2024	92,063	23.3%	1 / 4	Steady

=== European Parliament ===
Election	Wales			+/–
Election	Votes	%	Seats	+/–
1979	83,399	11.7	0 / 4	
1984	103,031	12.2	0 / 4	Steady
1989	115,062	12.9	0 / 4	Steady
1994	162,478	17.1	0 / 5	Steady
1999	185,235	29.6	2 / 5	▲2
2004	159,888	17.1	1 / 4	▼1
2009	126,702	18.5	1 / 4	Steady
2014	111,695	15.3	1 / 4	Steady
2019	163,928	19.6	1 / 4	Steady

== European Free Alliance ==
Plaid retains strong links with the Scottish National Party (SNP), with both parties' MPs co-operating closely with one another. They work as a single parliamentary group within Westminster, and were involved in joint campaigning, under the banner of a "Celtic alliance", during the 2001 and 2010 general elections. Both Plaid and the SNP, along with Mebyon Kernow of Cornwall, are members of the European Free Alliance (EFA), a European political party for regionalist, autonomist and pro-independence political parties across Europe. The EFA co-operates with the larger European Green Party to form the Greens–European Free Alliance (Greens/EFA) political group in the European Parliament, although the UK is no longer a member of the European Union.

== Sections ==
Plaid Cymru has several official sections and affiliated groups, with the aim of representing all parts of wider society. The official sections of Plaid are as follows:

- Plaid Anabledd - Section for the Disabled & Neurodivergent members of the party.
- Plaid BME - Section for the BME members of the party.
- Councillors' Association - Section for both elected councillors' and encouraging members to stand as a councillor for Plaid Cymru.
- Plaid Ifanc - Section for youth and student members of the party.
- Merched Plaid - Section for women members of the party.
- Plaid Pride - Section for LGBTQIA+, and ally members of the party.
- Undeb - Plaid Cymru's network of trade union activists.

== See also ==
- List of Plaid Cymru MSs
- List of Plaid Cymru MPs
- Credit unions in the United Kingdom
- Culture of Wales
- Politics of Wales
