= Rhun ap Iorwerth =

First Minister of Wales since 2026

The Right Honourable Rhun ap Iorwerth MS
- Official portrait, 2026

First Minister of Wales
- Incumbent
- Assumed office 12 May 2026
- Monarch: Charles III
- Deputy: Sioned Williams
- Preceded by: Eluned Morgan

Leader of Plaid Cymru
- Incumbent
- Assumed office 16 June 2023
- Deputy: Siân Gwenllian; Delyth Jewell
- Preceded by: Adam Price (Note: Llyr Gruffydd acted from 17 May to 16 June 2023.)
Opposition offices
Shadow Minister for Health
In office 25 May 2016 – 14 October 2016
Leader	Leanne Wood
Preceded by	Darren Millar
Succeeded by	Angela Burns
Plaid Cymru portfolios
2014–2016	Economy, Enterprise and Transport
2018–2020	Economy and Finance
2018–2023	Deputy Leader in the Senedd
2020–2021	Health and Finance
2021–2023	Health and Social Care

Member of the Senedd
- Incumbent
- Assumed office 1 August 2013
- Preceded by: Ieuan Wyn Jones
- Constituency: Bangor Conwy Môn (since 2026); Ynys Môn (until 2026)

Personal details
- Born: Rhun ap Iorwerth Jones; 27 August 1972 (age 54) Tonteg, Glamorgan, Wales
- Party: Plaid Cymru
- Children: 3
- Education: Cardiff University (BA)

Rhun ap Iorwerth (Note: Welsh pronunciation: [r̥ɨːn ap ˈjɔrwɛrθ]) (born 27 August 1972) is a Welsh politician and former broadcaster who has served as First Minister of Wales since 2026 and Leader of Plaid Cymru since 2023. He has served as Member of the Senedd (MS) since 2013, representing Bangor Conwy Môn, and until 2026, Ynys Môn.

Born in Tonteg, ap Iorwerth was raised in Anglesey and studied politics and Welsh at Cardiff University. He worked as a journalist for BBC Cymru Wales from 1994, serving as chief political correspondent, before working as a radio and television presenter. In 2013, he stepped down from broadcasting to pursue a career in politics, standing as the Plaid Cymru candidate in the Ynys Môn by-election, winning the seat and becoming an Assembly Member (AM). (Note: Prior to the Senedd and Elections (Wales) Act 2020, a member of the legislature of Wales, now known as a member of the Senedd (MS), was known as an "assembly member" (AM). From its establishment in 1999 until the act in 2020, the legislature was known as the "National Assembly for Wales", being renamed the "Senedd".)

Re-elected in the 2016 and 2021 elections, ap Iorwerth served as Shadow Minister for Health in the Wood shadow cabinet and held several positions on the Plaid Cymru frontbench team, including Deputy Leader following defeat in the 2018 party leadership election. Ap Iorwerth was elected unopposed as leader in 2023, and was nominated as First Minister of Wales following the party's victory in the 2026 Senedd election. He is the first FM to represent a party other than Welsh Labour or the Co-operative Party, his appointment ending the party's uninterrupted tenure in Welsh Government since devolution in 1999.

== Early life ==
Rhun ap Iorwerth was born in Tonteg, Glamorgan, Wales, on 27 August 1972 to Gwyneth and Edward Morus Jones, both teachers and Welsh language campaigners; his sister, Awen Iorwerth, is an orthopaedic surgeon. On his birth certificate, ap Iorwerth's surname was recorded as Jones, against the wishes of his parents to name him ap Iorwerth. The literal English meaning of his name is Rhun, son of Iorwerth, Iorwerth being a Welsh form of Edward. The name follows the Welsh patronymic naming system, which was common in Wales until the 18th century.

Ap Iorwerth grew up in Meirionnydd and, from the age of five, Anglesey. He attended Ysgol Gynradd Llandegfan, where his father was headteacher, and Ysgol David Hughes before going on to study politics and Welsh at Cardiff University. He has said that as a teenager, he briefly considered a career as a veterinarian and chose his A-levels accordingly, but later changed his mind and pursued a career in journalism. During his twenties, ap Iorwerth worked in a bar in Parma, Italy, alongside his future wife whilst she was a student at the University of Parma in the Erasmus Programme.

ap Iorwerth has described music as a key part of his childhood; his father a composer. He performed in a Welsh music band in the late 1980s and early 90s, named "Chwe Deg Naw" (English: Sixty Nine). The band played dance funk music and was named after the year 1969, which was prominent in Welsh history as the year of the investiture of Prince Charles. He set up a radio studio in his home and, at the age of 14, was a reporter on a children's news programme. He developed an interest in politics during the 1987 general election, during Ieuan Wyn Jones' campaign as a candidate for Ynys Môn.

== Broadcasting career ==
In 1994, ap Iorwerth began working as a political journalist for BBC Cymru Wales, for some time in Westminster, returning to Wales following the 1997 Welsh devolution referendum. In 2001, he became the chief political correspondent at BBC Cymru Wales, a position he held for five years before moving to presenting roles. He presented several television and radio programmes, including S4C's Newyddion and Dragon's Eye.

== Early political career ==
In 2013, ap Iorwerth stepped down from his role in the BBC to run as the Plaid Cymru candidate in the Ynys Môn by-election, which was triggered by the June resignation of Ieuan Wyn Jones, the former seat holder. During the campaign, Welsh Labour sought to publicize his support of the construction of the Wylfa nuclear power station, in contradiction to Plaid Cymru's policy in opposition to nuclear power. A Plaid Cymru blogger faced disciplinary action within the party after attacking ap Iorwerth for his position on the power station's construction. During his candidacy, suggestions were made within Plaid Cymru that he could serve as a future party leader, to which he found "somehow amusing" considering his status as a newcomer.

=== Member of the Senedd (2013–present) ===
On 1 August 2013, he won the by-election with 12,601 votes (58.24%), a majority of 9,166 over Labour. The result was Plaid Cymru's fifth victory in a National Assembly election. On 2 August, ap Iorwerth was sworn in as the Assembly Member (AM) for Ynys Môn, and arrived at the Senedd building accompanied by his wife and three children, cheered by Plaid Cymru supporters. The result caused Labour to lose their status as the majority in the Senedd.

Official portrait of ap Iorwerth as an Assembly Member, 2016

In the 2016 National Assembly for Wales election, ap Iorwerth was re-elected as the AM for Ynys Môn with 13,788 votes (54.8%). Plaid Cymru leader Leanne Wood appointed him into her shadow cabinet as Shadow Minister for Health. In the 2021 Senedd election, he was re-elected as the Member of the Senedd (MS) for Ynys Môn with 15,506 votes (55.9%).

He has held several positions on the Plaid Cymru frontbench team. In a 2014 reshuffle of the frontbench ahead of the 2016 National Assembly election, he was appointed as the economy, enterprise and transport spokesman by Leader of Plaid Cymru Leanne Wood. In 2018, he was appointed by Plaid Cymru leader Adam Price as economy and finance spokesperson, the frontbench position formerly held by Price, and was then moved to health and finance in a 2020 reshuffle. Following the 2021 Senedd election, he was made health and social care spokesperson.

In 2022, he announced his candidacy as Plaid Cymru's prospective parliamentary candidate for Ynys Môn in the 2024 general election, but was replaced with Llinos Medi.

In 2023, as Plaid Cymru Spokesperson for Health and Social Care, he called for a public inquiry into the Betsi Cadwaladr University Health Board and for the health board to be replaced with smaller boards.

=== Leader of Plaid Cymru (2023–present) ===
In 2023, an internal report found "bullying, harassment and misogyny" within Plaid Cymru, leading to the resignation of Plaid Cymru leader Adam Price, with Llyr Gruffydd succeeding as interim leader. Ap Iorwerth ran as a candidate in the subsequent leadership election. He had previously ran as a candidate for leadership in the 2018 election, defeated by Adam Price, after which he was appointed as joint-deputy leader of Plaid Cymru alongside Siân Gwenllian. On 16 July, ap Iorwerth was elected as leader unopposed, vowing to make the party one "where everyone feels safe and supported and empowered to play their parts."

In 2024, he ended the co-operational agreement between Plaid Cymru and Welsh Labour, following concerns regarding Welsh Labour leader First Minister Vaughan Gething. The concerns included allegations of perjury against Gething, his dismissal of Minister for Social Partnership Hannah Blythyn, and his failure to repay a £200,000 campaign donation. Ap Iorwerth described the factors as demonstrating "a significant lack of judgement". Gething said following the withdrawal: "we are disappointed Plaid Cymru has decided to walk away from their opportunity to deliver for the people of Wales".

As leader, he had been described by the BBC as having a more "confrontational" approach to the Welsh Labour government.

== First Minister of Wales (2026–present) ==
=== Appointment ===
Ap Iorwerth’s cabinet outside the Crown Buildings, Cardiff, 13 May 2026

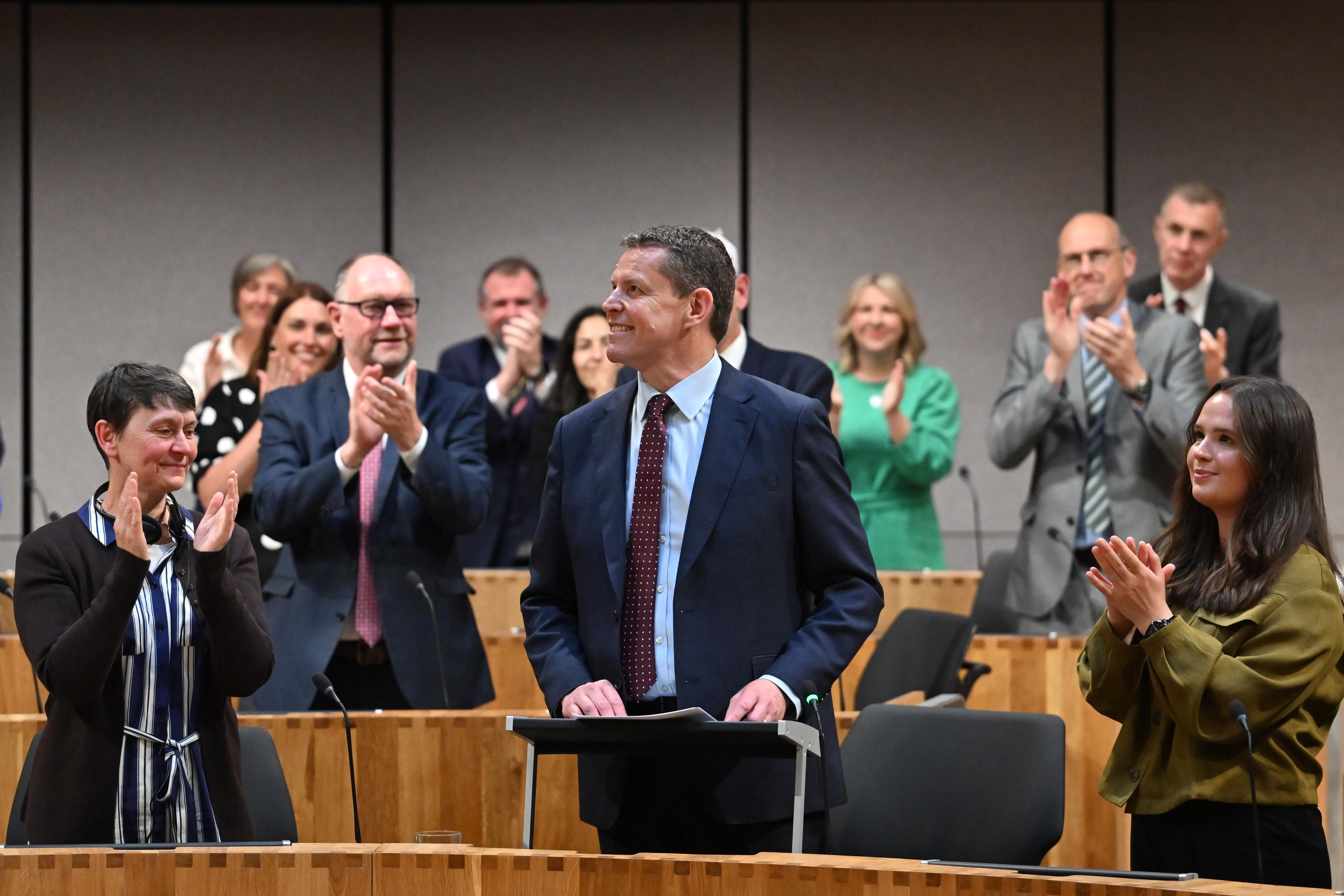
Ap Iorwerth following his election as First Minister of Wales

Rhun Ap Iorwerth with Irish Sinn Féin leader Mary Lou McDonald.

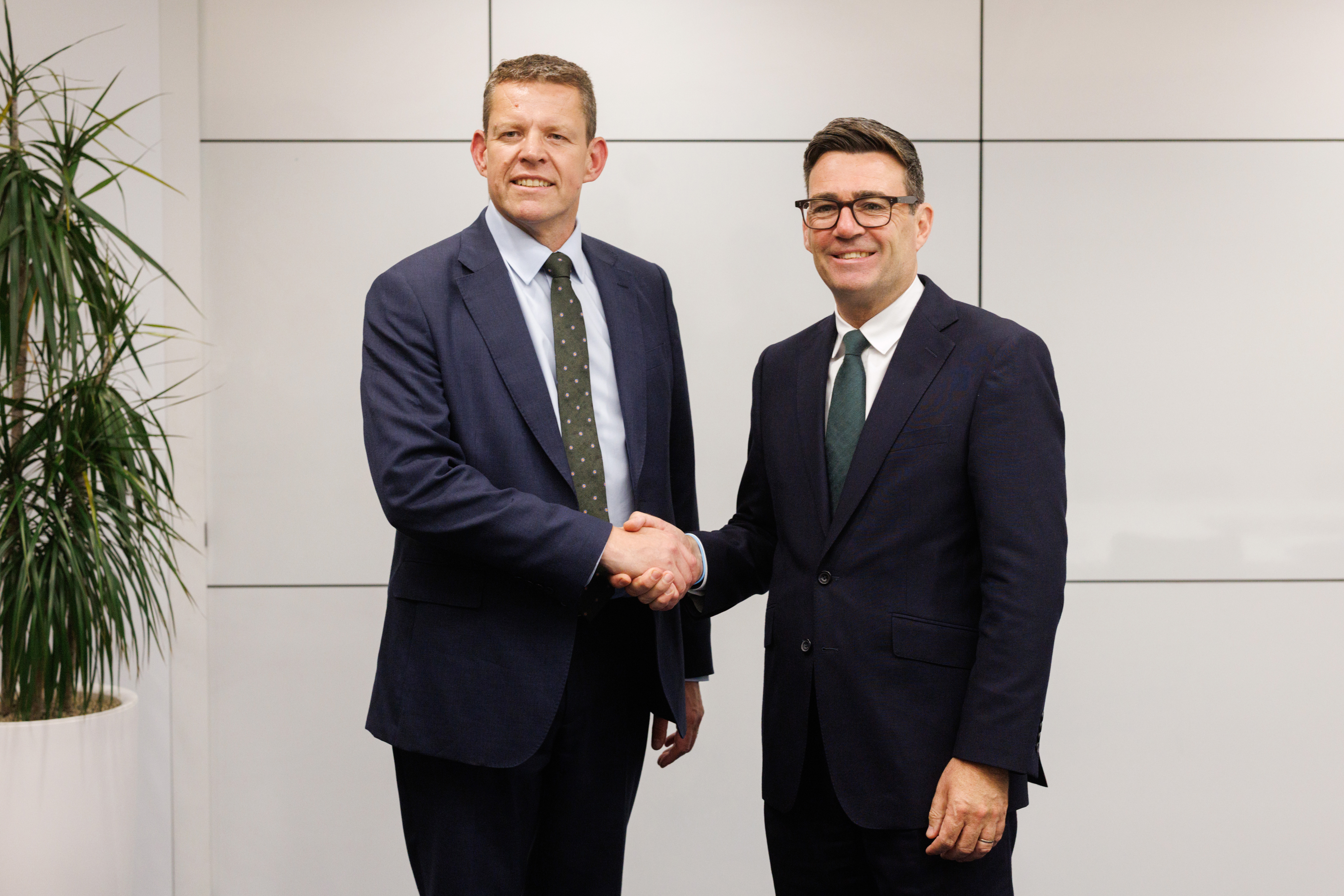
Ap Iorwerth meeting Prime Minister Andy Burnham in 2026

In January 2026, after opinion polls suggested Plaid Cymru would win the most seats in the 2026 Senedd election, but not manage to win enough seats for a majority, Rhun ap Iorwerth said he preferred to form a minority government than a coalition government. In the 2026 Senedd election on 7 May, ap Iorwerth was re-elected to the Senedd, with a seat in the newly-formed Bangor Conwy Môn constituency. Plaid Cymru became the largest party in the Senedd, winning 43 seats. However, as predicted by the opinion polls, it did not secure the 49 seats required for a majority. Ap Iorwerth confirmed that Plaid Cymru would seek to form a minority government, and that his party preferred a "cooperative approach" to a coalition.

Ap Iorwerth was elected by the Senedd to succeed Eluned Morgan as First Minister of Wales on 12 May 2026. He was elected by 44 MSs: 42 members of his party Plaid Cymru (not including the non-voting Deputy Llywydd Kerry Ferguson) and the two members of the Green Party. All 34 Reform UK MSs voted for their Welsh Leader Dan Thomas, and the 7 Welsh Conservative MSs voted for their Leader Darren Millar, with Labour MSs, and sole Liberal Democrat MS Jane Dodds, abstaining from the vote. Ap Iorwerth was officially sworn in as First Minister later the same day by High Court Justice Mary Stacey. He is the first First Minister to come from a party other than Welsh Labour.

=== International relations ===
==== Ireland ====
Ap Iorwerth made his first foreign visit as First Minister to Ireland on 24 June 2026, where he met President Catherine Connolly at Áras an Uachtaráin. He also attended the sixth Ireland-Wales Forum where he met the Irish Government's foreign affairs minister, Helen McEntee. During the meeting, the two governments agreed to closer ties between the two nations, and discussed the possibility of a future collaboration between the nations regarding renewable energy projects in the Irish Sea. In an interview with RTÉ News: Six One, ap Iorwerth stated that he was leading a pro-Europe government, and that his government wanted "as close a relationship with Europe as possible", and a "stronger relationship than ever" with Ireland.

==== Israel and Palestine ====
In August 2026 at the Eisteddfod Ap Iorwerth, alongside Deputy First Minister Sioned Williams, gave speeches in which they publicly stated that they believed Israel's actions in Gaza amounted to genocide, with Ap Iorwerth saying that "We call out the genocide for what it is.", and that his government would stand with Palestine. They also met with Palestinian curator Faisal Saleh, to view an exhibition documenting the destruction of the Gaza Strip.

=== Economic Policy ===
Iorwerth entered office during the major and ongoing cost of living crisis. During the election campaign, he and his party advocated for the "Cynnal" scheme, a weekly £10 payment to 15,000 low income households in Wales, in order to combat rising child poverty. In October 2026, the Welsh Government also began the creation of a new economic development panel, chaired by Adam Price, the Enterprise & Energy Secretary.

==== Failed supplementary budget ====
In June 2026, Ap Iorwerth announced that the Welsh Government would pass a supplementary budget before the Senedd recess in July. The budget would have allocated funding to NHS Wales in order to help cut waiting times, expand free school meals to secondary school children, and provide £55,000,000 for Plaid Cymru's "flagship policy" of universal childcare for Wales. On 14 July, the Senedd voted against the plans after Welsh Labour withdrew their support. Welsh Labour MS Huw Thomas stated that the party could not support the budget due to criticism from teaching unions over a dispute regarding the funding for pupils with additional learning needs. Finance Minister Elin Jones stated that she was "flabbergasted" by the decision, and accused Welsh Labour of being a "destructive opposition".

== Political positions ==
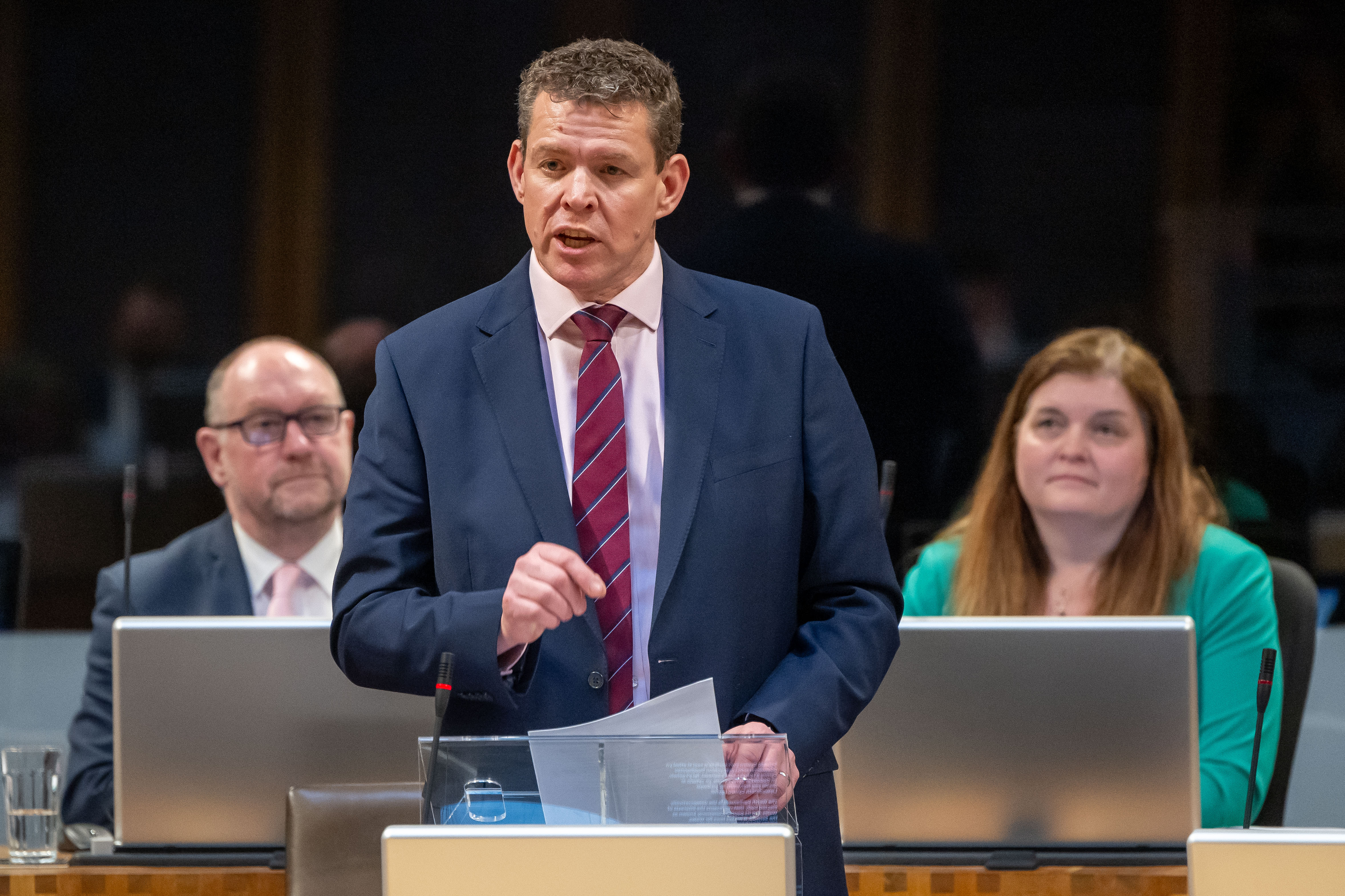
Ap Iorwerth speaking in the Senedd debating chamber in 2024

Ap Iorwerth has identified himself as being an environmentalist, internationalist and republican. He is described as being centrist in the media, but he self describes himself as on "the left of politics" and socialist.

=== European Union ===
He supports a re-accession of the United Kingdom into the European Union, single market and customs union, and has described Wales' vote for Brexit as "the greatest act of economic self-sabotage in modern history".

=== Nuclear power ===
Ap Iorwerth is a key supporter of the reopening of the Wylfa nuclear power station which is situated in his constituency of Bangor Conwy Môn. The position of his party is that there should be no new nuclear power plants and only the redevelopment of old ones.

=== Welsh independence ===
In 2026, ap Iorwerth said that he hoped Wales would become independent in the future but said that it would be up to "the people of Wales" to decide when it would be ready.

== Personal life and honours ==
Rhun ap Iorwerth is married to his wife, Llinos, whom he met at Cardiff University. He has three children. Following his victory in the 2013 Ynys Môn by-election, he told WalesOnline that he was motivated to pursue a career in politics following the 2012 death of his mother Gwyneth Morus Jones. In his personal life, he likes to play the guitar and playing rugby for the Senedd rugby team.

Ap Iorwerth was inducted to the Gorsedd in 2025, at a ceremony during the National Eisteddfod of Wales at Wrexham. He was appointed a member of the Privy Council on 10 June 2026, entitling him to the style The Right Honourable for life.

== Notes ==
Senedd
Preceded by Ieuan Wyn Jones	Member of the Senedd for Ynys Môn; 2013–2026	Succeeded by Constituency abolished
Preceded by Constituency created	Member of the Senedd for Bangor Conwy Môn; 2026–present	Incumbent
Political offices
Preceded by Darren Millar	Shadow Minister for Health and Social Care; 2016	Succeeded by Angela Burns
Preceded by Eluned Morgan	First Minister of Wales; 2026–present	Incumbent
Party political offices
Preceded by Llyr Gruffydd; Acting	Leader of Plaid Cymru; 2023–present	Incumbent
