= 2012 Plaid Cymru leadership election =

Plaid Cymru leadership election

- 3 January 2012 – 15 March 2012
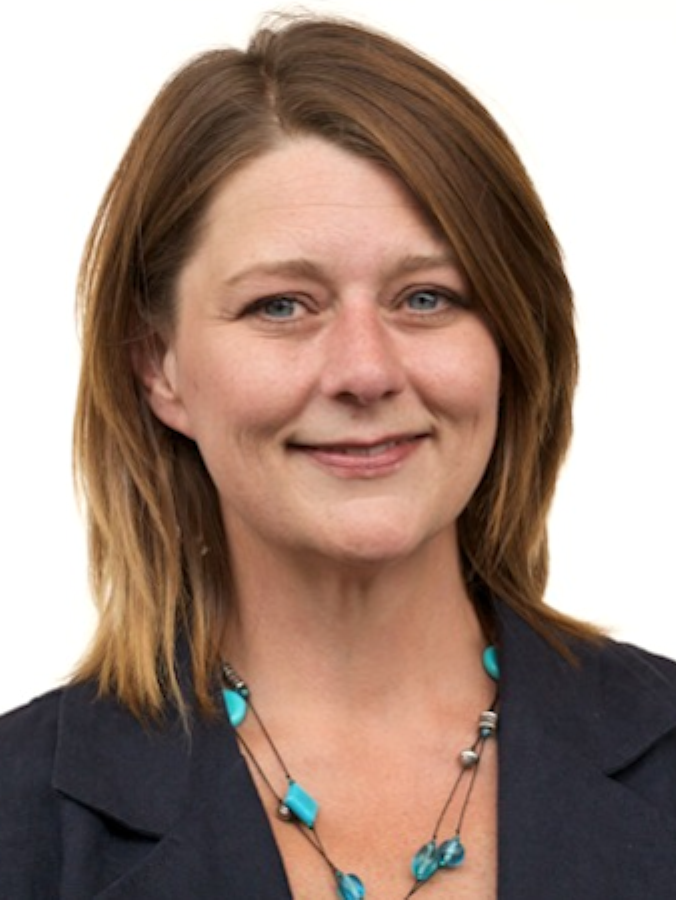

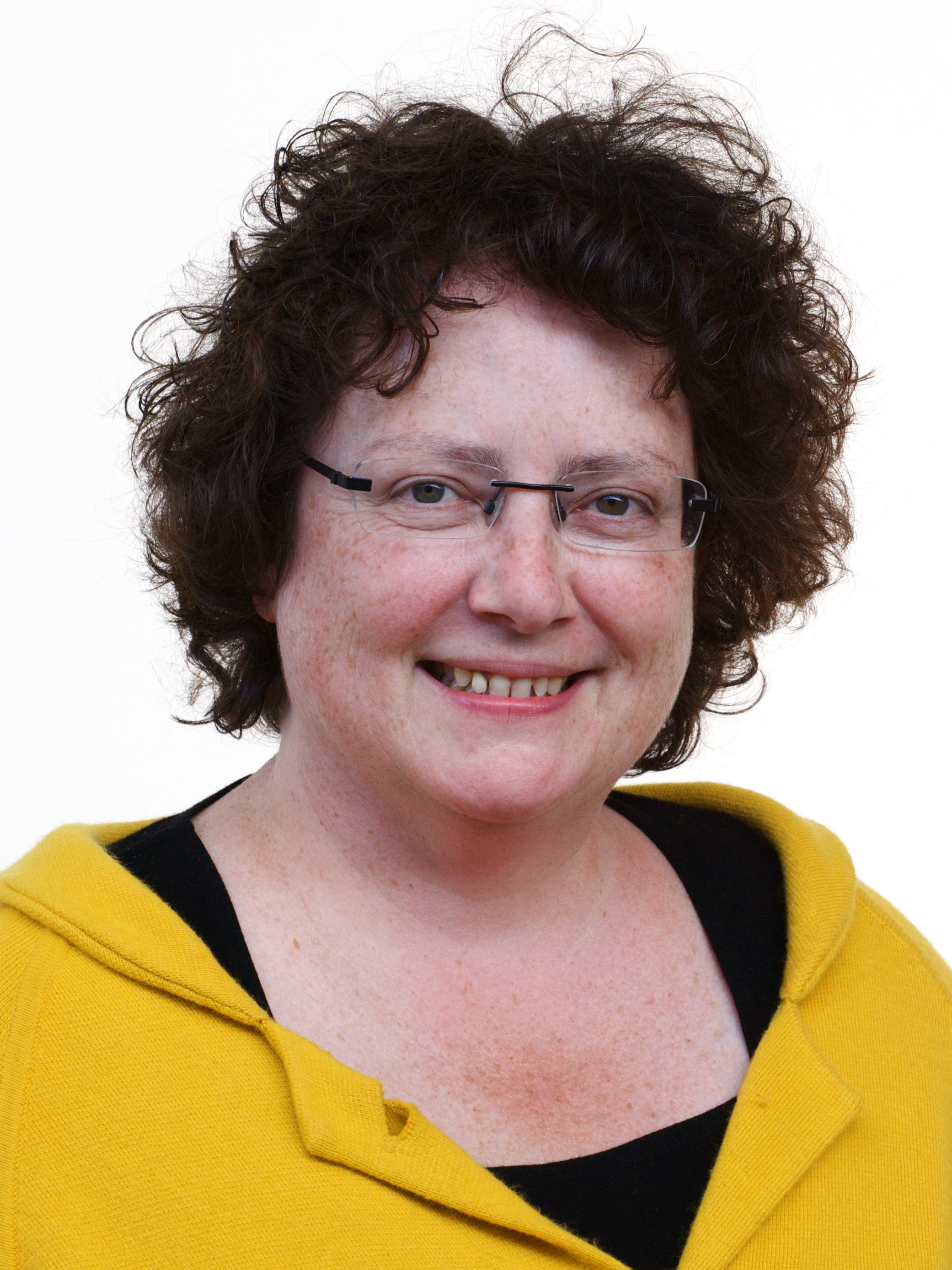

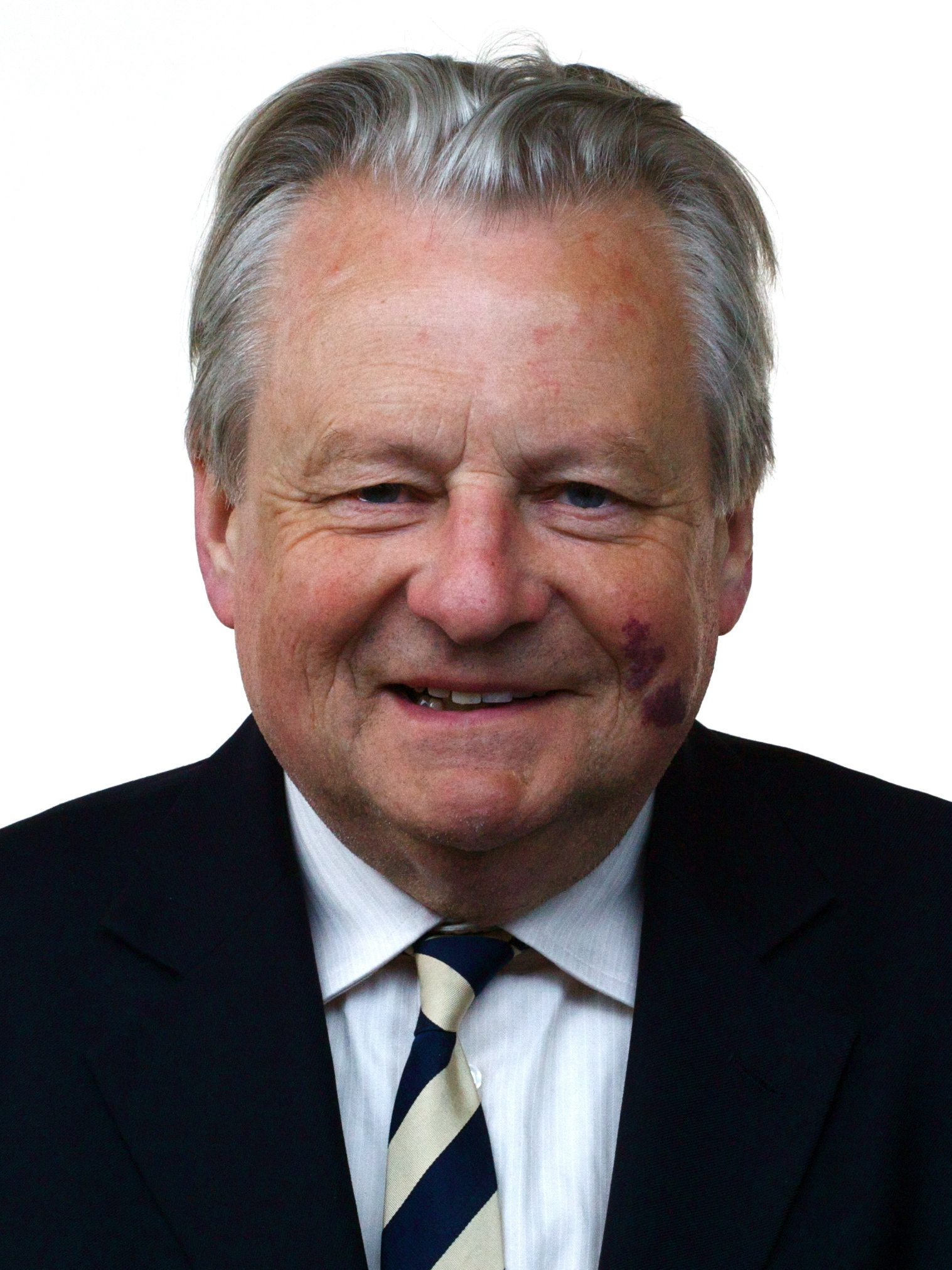
Candidate	Leanne Wood	Elin Jones	Dafydd Elis-Thomas
First round	2,879	1,884	1,278
Percentage	47.7%	31.2%	21.1%
Second round	3,326	2,494	—
Percentage	57.1%	42.9%	—
Leader before election
Ieuan Wyn Jones
Elected Leader
Leanne Wood

The 2012 Plaid Cymru leadership election was held following the resignation of Ieuan Wyn Jones following the 2011 Assembly Elections. Following the election Jones originally stated that he would resign in the first half of the Assembly term. Nominations officially opened on 3 January 2012.

The leadership was fought by former Agriculture Minister Elin Jones, former party leader Dafydd Elis-Thomas and backbencher Leanne Wood. Simon Thomas declared his intention to run, but later withdrew in favour of Elin Jones.

The Guardian reported that 7,863 members were entitled to vote, which was an increase in membership of 23% over the preceding four-month period.

Leanne Wood was declared leader on 15 March 2012, taking over as leader the day after.

== Results ==
Candidate	First round		Second round		
Candidate	Votes	%	Transfers	Votes	%
Leanne Wood	2,879	47.7	▲447	3,326	57.1
Elin Jones	1,884	31.2	▲610	2,494	42.9
Dafydd Elis-Thomas	1,278	21.1			
Total	6,041	100	1,057	5,820	100

== Endorsements ==
Of the 11 Plaid Assembly Members, Elin Jones received the support of 6 (including herself), Leanne Wood won the backing of 3 (including herself) and Dafydd Elis-Thomas 1 (himself). Out going leader Ieuan Wyn Jones did not publicly back any candidate.

=== Elin Jones ===
AMs:

- Jocelyn Davies
- Rhodri Glyn Thomas
- Alun Ffred Jones
- Simon Thomas
- Llyr Huws Gruffydd

MPs

- Hywel Williams

Others

- Dafydd Trystan
- Dai Lloyd, former AM
- Nerys Evans, former AM
- Cynog Dafis, former AM and MP

=== Dafydd Elis-Thomas ===
- Councillor Delme Bowen,
- Dyfed Edwards, Leader of Gwynedd County Council
- Chris Franks, former AM

=== Leanne Wood ===
AMs:

- Bethan Jenkins
- Lindsay Whittle

MPs:

- Jonathan Edwards (Campaign Manager)

Others:

- Adam Price, former MP
