= Siân Gwenllian =

Welsh politician

Siân Gwenllian MS
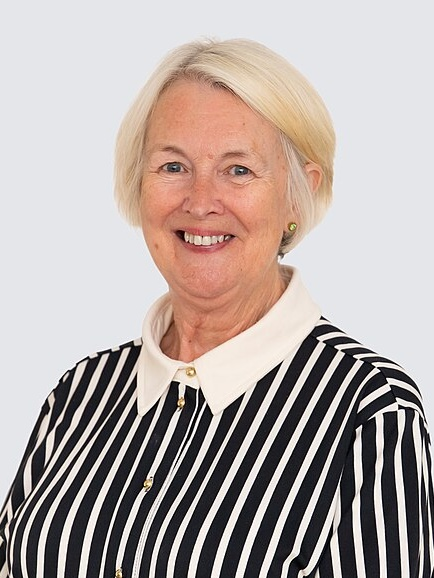
- Official portrait, 2026

Cabinet Minister for Local Government, Housing and Planning
- Incumbent
- Assumed office 13 May 2026
- First Minister: Rhun ap Iorwerth
- Preceded by: Jayne Bryant

Deputy Leader of Plaid Cymru
- In office 23 October 2018 – 27 June 2023 Serving with Rhun ap Iorwerth
- Leader: Adam Price; Llyr Gruffydd (acting); Rhun ap Iorwerth
- Preceded by: Elin Jones (2016)
- Succeeded by: Delyth Jewell

Member of the Senedd
- Incumbent
- Assumed office 5 May 2016
- Preceded by: Alun Ffred Jones
- Constituency: Arfon (2016–2026); Gwynedd Maldwyn (2026–)
- Majority: 8,642

Plaid Cymru portfolios
- 2024 – 2026: Housing and Planning
- 2021 – 2024: Lead Designated Member in the Co-operation Agreement

Personal details
- Born: 19 June 1956 (age 70)
- Party: Plaid Cymru
- Education: Aberystwyth University; Cardiff University

Siân Gwenllian is a Welsh politician who has served as Cabinet Minister for Local Government, Housing and Planning since 2026. A member of Plaid Cymru, she has been a Member of the Senedd (MS) since 2016, representing Gwynedd Maldwyn since 2026 and previously Arfon

== Early life and career ==
Gwenllian was educated at Friars School, Bangor and at Aberystwyth and Cardiff universities. She was then a journalist with the BBC and HTV in Bangor before becoming a county councillor for Y Felinheli, the village where she was brought up and currently lives.

Between 2010 and 2012 she was responsible for the authority's finance portfolio. Between 2012 and 2014 she was Cabinet Member for Education, lead on children and young people, and was deputy leader of the Council. In 2014, she was appointed Gwynedd Small Business Champion, responsible for promoting this sector of the economy in Gwynedd.

== Senedd career ==
Gwenllian represented the Arfon constituency in the Welsh Parliament. She was elected for the first time in 2016, and was re-elected in 2021 with a majority of 8,642 votes.

Gwenllian previously held the portfolio for Local Government, the Welsh Language, Equalities and Planning in Plaid's shadow cabinet in the 5th Senedd.

Gwenllian was also a member of the Senedd's Committee for Children, Young People and Education, Finance Committee and the Senedd's Business Committee.

In 2018, she became co-deputy leader of Plaid Cymru alongside fellow Ynys Môn AM Rhun ap Iorwerth. Upon her appointment by leader Adam Price, Siân Gwenllian stated that, "I'm proud to be a member of this group of talented and skilled individuals and look forward to working together as a collective as we move towards the project of building a New Wales".

Gwenllian was also appointed as an Senedd Commission Commissioner in November 2018 and was responsible for official languages and the delivery and transformation of services to Assembly Members.

From 2018 to 2021, Gwenllian was Plaid Cymru's spokesperson for the Welsh Language, Education, Children and Young People and Culture. She was also the Chief Whip and Deputy Leader of Plaid Cymru's shadow cabinet until 2023.

Gwenllian was re-elected in 2021 with a higher percentage of the vote than any other candidate throughout Wales.

Gwenllian was Plaid Cymru's Lead Designated Member in the 2021–2024 Co-operation agreement between Plaid Cymru and the Welsh Government.

In the 2026 Senedd election, Gwenllian was re-elected as MS for the Gwynedd Maldwyn constituency, which replaced the former Arfon constituency. Gwenllian had been placed first on Plaid Cymru's list for the constituency.

== Personal life ==
Gwenllian had four children with her husband, Dafydd who died from cancer in 1999, when their youngest son was three years old, Gwenllian brought up her children as a single parent.

During her time at Aberystwyth University she was President of the Students' Union. She was also a Member of the Board of Governors of schools and a Member of the Community Council before becoming a County Councillor.

Gwenllian is the sister of the disgraced former Plaid County Councillor Iwan Huws who admitted to attempting to defraud Anglesey County Council and Beaumaris Town Council by asking a TV Production Company to pay £3,000 into his personal bank account for hire of Beaumaris Pier and adjacent Car Park. He was previously chief executive of the Eryri National Park Authority and director of the National Trust in Wales and upto the date of his resignation was the Plaid Cymru Councillor for Bethel and Y Felinheli. At the time of the investigation he was serving on Gwynedd's Education and Economy Scrutiny and Pensions committees and was employed by Anglesey County Council as a senior maritime officer.
