= Adam Price =

Welsh politician (born 1968)

Adam Price MS
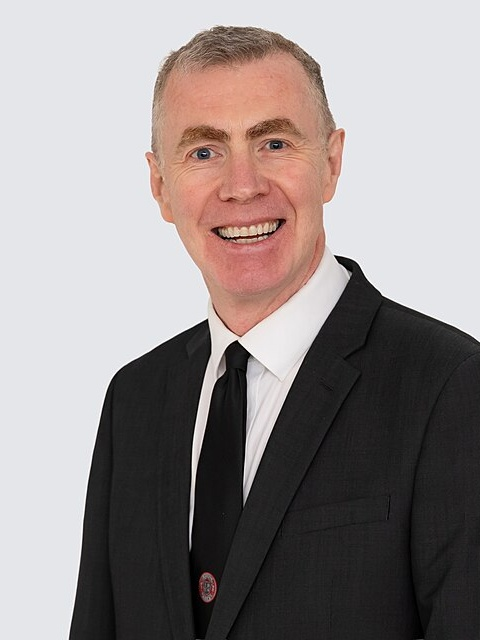
- Official portrait, 2026

Cabinet Minister for Enterprise, Connectivity and Energy
- Incumbent
- Assumed office 13 May 2026
- First Minister: Rhun ap Iorwerth
- Preceded by: Rebecca Evans

Leader of Plaid Cymru
- In office 28 September 2018 – 16 May 2023
- President: The Lord Wigley
- Deputy: Rhun ap Iorwerth; Siân Gwenllian
- Preceded by: Leanne Wood
- Succeeded by: Rhun ap Iorwerth (Note: Llyr Gruffydd acted from 17 May to 16 June 2023)

Member of the Senedd
- Incumbent
- Assumed office 5 May 2016
- Preceded by: Rhodri Glyn Thomas
- Constituency: Carmarthen East and Dinefwr (2016–2026); Sir Gaerfyrddin (2026–present)

Member of Parliament for Carmarthen East and Dinefwr
- In office 7 June 2001 – 12 April 2010
- Preceded by: Alan Williams
- Succeeded by: Jonathan Edwards

Personal details
- Born: Adam Robert Price; 23 September 1968 (age 58) Carmarthen, Carmarthenshire, Wales
- Party: Plaid Cymru
- Children: 2
- Education: Ysgol Dyffryn Aman; Cardiff University (BA); Harvard University (MPA)

Adam Robert Price (born 23 September 1968) is a Welsh politician who served as Leader of Plaid Cymru from September 2018 to May 2023. He has been the Member of the Senedd (MS) for Sir Gaerfyrddin, and formerly Carmarthen East and Dinefwr, since 2016. Price was previously a Member of Parliament (MP) for the same Westminster constituency from 2001 to 2010. He is currently serving as Member of Senedd for Sir Gaerfyrddin and Cabinet Minister for Enterprise.

== Early life and career ==
Price was born in Carmarthen and grew up in Tycroes. His father, Rufus, was a miner at Betws Colliery. His parents were Welsh speakers, but raised their children to speak English; Price was taught Welsh as a teenager by his brother Adrian. His parents were active in politics, starting a branch of Plaid Cymru in Ammanford, Carmarthenshire.

He went to Ysgol Dyffryn Aman in Ammanford. He later studied at Cardiff University, gaining a BA in European Community studies in 1991. He also studied at Saarland University in Saarbrücken in Germany.

After graduating, Price worked as a research associate at Cardiff University's department of city and regional planning. From 1998, he was the managing director of the Newidiem Economic Development Consultancy.

== Member of Parliament ==
Price unsuccessfully contested the Gower seat in 1992 winning 3.5% of the vote. He was elected Member of Parliament for Carmarthen East and Dinefwr in 2001, holding the seat until he stood down in 2010.

In 2002, Price obtained a letter written by Tony Blair to the Romanian Government in support of Lakshmi Mittal's LNM steel company, which was in the process of bidding to buy Romania's state-owned steel industry. This revelation caused controversy, because Mittal had given £125,000 to the British Labour Party the previous year. Although Blair defended his letter as simply "celebrating the success" of a British company, he was criticised because LNM was registered in the Dutch Antilles and employed less than 1% of its workforce in the UK. LNM was a "major global competitor of Britain's own struggling steel industry". Blair's letter hinted that the privatisation of the firm and sale to Mittal might help smooth the way for Romania's entry into the European Union. It also had a passage, removed prior to Blair's signing of it, describing Mittal as "a friend".

In 2004, Price announced his intention to begin a process of impeachment against Tony Blair following controversy over the Iraq War, with the backing of Plaid Cymru and SNP MPs as well as Boris Johnson and Nigel Evans. If successful, it could have seen Blair tried before the House of Lords; however, as expected, the measure failed. Price was ejected from the Commons chamber in 2005 after accusing the Prime Minister of having "misled" Parliament and then refusing to withdraw his comment, in violation of the rules of the House. In 2006, Price opened a three-hour debate on an inquiry into the Iraq War, the first such debate in over two years. The SNP and Plaid Cymru motion proposing a committee of seven senior MPs to review "the way in which the responsibilities of government were discharged in relation to Iraq", was defeated by 298 votes to 273.

Writing in the Welsh language current affairs magazine Barn in April 2007, Price criticised UK government policy on drugs, indicating his support for their legalisation under medical supervision.

In August 2007, Price highlighted what he perceived as a lack of a Welsh focus in BBC news broadcasts. Price threatened to withhold future television licence fees in response to a lack of thorough news coverage of Wales, echoing a BBC Audience Council for Wales July report citing public frustration over how the Welsh Assembly is characterised in national media. Plaid AM Bethan Jenkins agreed with Price and called for responsibility for broadcasting to be devolved to the Welsh Assembly, voicing similar calls from Scotland's First Minister Alex Salmond. Criticism of the BBC's news coverage for Wales and Scotland since devolution prompted debate of possibly providing evening news broadcasts with specific focus for both countries.

Following the 2007 Welsh Assembly elections, a parliamentary standards and privileges committee found Plaid MPs Price, Elfyn Llwyd, and Hywel Williams guilty of improperly advertising during the elections. Though the committee acknowledged the MPs did not break any rules of the House of Commons, the committee believed the timing of the adverts were planned to coincide with the Assembly elections. Parliamentary funds are available for MPs to communicate with constituents regularly. However, the committee found that the three used this communication allowance improperly as part of Plaid's campaigning during the elections as the adverts were placed in publications with a circulation outside of their respective constituencies. Of the committee findings, Plaid MP group leader Elfyn Llwyd said that they would comply with the findings of the committee, but that they had "acted in good faith throughout, and fully in line with the advice that was offered to us by the DFA (Department of Finance and Administration) at the time of the publication of the reports". The MPs had to repay the money, about £5,000 each, and report the costs as part of Plaid's election spending.

In August 2007, Price began a regular column in the weekly Welsh language current affairs magazine Golwg.

Price has been a long-standing opponent to the war in Afghanistan and put forward an Early Day Motion calling for a timetable for withdrawal. Price has been critical of the strategy and objectives of the war.

In August 2010, Price announced he would not to stand in the 2011 Welsh Assembly elections, and instead stated he planned to spend a year in the United States on a Fulbright scholarship, before returning to the Welsh Assembly for the 2016 elections.

== Business and charity career ==
In September 2010, he began studying at Harvard University, for a Master's in Public Administration and gaining a fellowship at the Center for International Development in the John F. Kennedy School of Government. He returned to Wales two years later and helped form financial software firm Ideoba in Bridgend. The company collapsed and subsequently went bankrupt after being unable to secure further investment. He then worked for the innovation charity Nesta.

Between September and October 2014, Price presented a 3-part documentary series titled Streic (Strike) about the 1984–85 Welsh miners' strike, broadcast on S4C.

== Later political career ==
Having stood down from the UK Parliament in 2010, he announced in 2013 his intention to re-enter politics and stand again for the National Assembly for Wales, and returned to politics when he was elected to the Assembly in 2016 for Carmarthen East and Dinefwr.

On 2 July 2018, Price published an article for WalesOnline where he called on Plaid Cymru leader Leanne Wood to accept proposals to implement a new co-leadership model for Plaid Cymru, "where two leaders, male and female, jointly lead the party". He had criticised the direction of the party under Wood. Wood rejected the proposals, leading Price to challenge Wood for the leadership and declare his candidacy for the 2018 Plaid Cymru leadership election on 4 July, along with fellow Plaid Cymru AM Rhun ap Iorwerth.

Price proposed several new policies Plaid Cymru could adopt as part of his leadership bid. He suggested his party should use Wales's incoming devolved powers on taxation to put one penny on income tax for increased funding in the education system. In August, Price released a ten-point policy plan setting out his vision for the Welsh economy, policies included: cuts and swaps to tax, a publicly owned Welsh energy company, infrastructure spending, and a job guarantee programme. A separate document he released for his campaign, "Wales 2030: Seven Steps to Independence", detailed step-by-step measures his party could take to achieve Welsh independence by the year 2030.

=== Leader of Plaid Cymru (2018–2023) ===
In the 2018 Plaid Cymru leadership election, Price was elected leader of Plaid Cymru with almost half of members' votes, defeating incumbent leader, Leanne Wood. Price announced a new frontbench team the following month. In October 2018, Price revealed that he had recruited the SNP's former deputy leader Angus Robertson to oversee a review of Plaid Cymru's campaign strategy. Guest speaking at that month's SNP conference, he backed calls for a second referendum on the UK's membership of the European Union, and said he and his party would campaign to remain in the EU in the event of another referendum.

In January 2019, Price spoke in favour of cooperation among the Celtic nations of Britain and Ireland following Brexit. Among his proposals were a Celtic Development Bank for joint infrastructure and investment projects in energy, transport and communications in Ireland, Wales, Scotland and the Isle of Man and the foundation of a Celtic union the structure of which is already existent in the Good Friday Agreement according to Price. Speaking to RTÉ, the Irish national broadcaster, he proposed Wales and Ireland working together to promote the indigenous languages of each nation.

At the 2019 general election, Plaid Cymru's manifesto titled 'Wales, It's Us' included policies such as a second Brexit referendum in which the party would campaign to remain in the European Union, investment in the development of environmentally friendly industry referred to as a 'green jobs revolution', more funding for education and police, drug law reform, greater devolution of powers over tax and giving the devolved administrations a veto over the UK going to war. The party also formed an agreement with the Green Party and Liberal Democrats called the Unite to Remain alliance to stand down for each over in certain constituencies, Price described this decision as "grownup politics". Plaid Cymru left the election with the same number of seats and a small decrease in its vote share.

In December 2020, Price promised that his party would hold a referendum on Welsh independence if it won a majority at the 2021 Senedd election though any such vote would need the agreement of the UK government. Other policies his party promised for that election included free school meals for every primary school child, lower average council tax along with more social and affordable housing, health professionals and eco friendly jobs. Price stated that he would form a government which would create a "fairer, greener future where our country thrives by taking control of its own affairs and unleashing its greatest potential – its people". The party made a net gain of one seat in that election with a slight reduction in its proportion of votes cast but lost second-place position to the Welsh Conservatives.

In November 2021, Price and Welsh Labour leader Mark Drakeford reached a co-operation agreement on policy in a wide range of areas. Ideas they planned to implement included free-at-the-point-of-use social care, expanding services for children and restrictions on second homes. The deal was the third time Welsh Labour and Plaid Cymru had agreed to work together in the era of devolution.

In May 2023, the publication of a report which detailed failings by the party to prevent sexual harassment and bullying led to media coverage suggesting that Price had agreed to resign the party leadership, and Price confirmed this in a statement on 10 May. Acknowledging that he "no longer had the united support of [his] colleagues", Price stated that he would step down officially the following week, once the process for electing a new interim leader was finalised. On 11 May, Plaid Cymru announced that Llyr Gruffydd, Senedd member for North Wales, would replace him as interim party leader, and that this would be confirmed by the party's National Executive Committee (NEC) on 13 May. The handover of power, including notifying the Electoral Commission, took place on 16 May after Price took part in his final First Minister's Questions.

=== Post leadership (2023–present) ===
In the 2026 Senedd election, Price was re-elected as MS for Sir Gaerfyrddin.

== Personal life ==
Price is gay. He has two children. He also features in the Rainbow List of leading Welsh figures.

== Publications ==
- Price, Adam (2010), Why Vote Plaid Cymru?, Biteback Limited, ISBN 978-1849540360
- Morgan, Kevin John, & Price, Adam, 2011, The Collective Entrepreneur: Social Enterprise and the Smart State, Community Housing Cymru and Charity Bank
- Price, Adam (2018), Wales – The First and Final Colony, Y Lolfa, ISBN 978-1784615925

== Notes ==
Parliament of the United Kingdom
Preceded by Alan Williams	Member of Parliament for Carmarthen East and Dinefwr; 2001–2010	Succeeded by Jonathan Edwards
Senedd
Preceded by Rhodri Glyn Thomas	Member of the Senedd for Carmarthen East and Dinefwr; 2016–present	Incumbent
Party political offices
Preceded by Leanne Wood	Leader of Plaid Cymru; 2018–2023	Succeeded by Llyr Gruffydd; Acting
