= Llyr Gruffydd =

Welsh politician, Member of the Senedd

Llyr Gruffydd MS
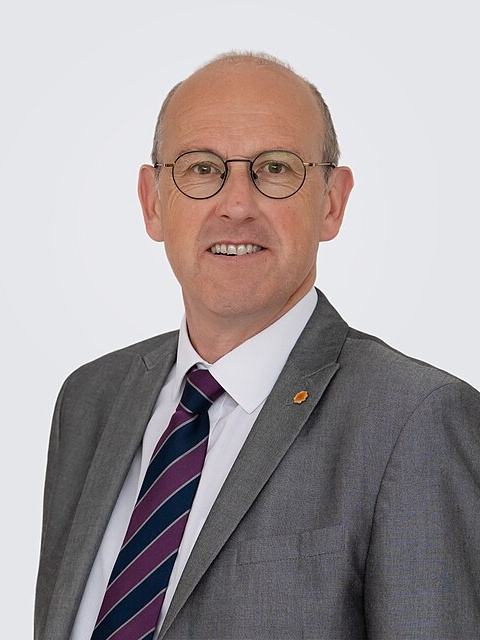
- Official portrait, 2026

Cabinet Minister for Rural Resilience and Sustainability
- Incumbent
- Assumed office 13 May 2026
- First Minister: Rhun ap Iorwerth
- Preceded by: Huw Irranca-Davies

Leader of Plaid Cymru
- Acting; 17 May 2023 – 16 June 2023
- Deputy: Rhun ap Iorwerth; Siân Gwenllian
- Preceded by: Adam Price
- Succeeded by: Rhun ap Iorwerth

Member of the Senedd
- Incumbent
- Assumed office 6 May 2011
- Preceded by: Janet Ryder
- Constituency: North Wales (2011–2026); Clwyd (2026–present)

Personal details
- Born: Llyr Huws Gruffydd; 25 September 1970 (age 56) Carmarthenshire, Wales
- Party: Plaid Cymru
- Education: Aberystwyth University (BA)

Llyr Huws Gruffydd (born 25 September 1970) is a Welsh Plaid Cymru politician, serving as a Member of the Senedd (MS) for the North Wales region from 2011 to 2026, and then for Clwyd from May 2026. He acted as interim leader of Plaid Cymru from 16 May to 16 June 2023.

== Education and early career ==
Gruffydd attended Bro Myrddin Welsh Comprehensive School and Aberystwyth University where he graduated with a BA degree in Welsh.

He began his working career as a youth worker, then worked for Wales Youth Agency and the Council for Wales of Voluntary Youth Services and then as a project manager for an economic development company. Gruffydd has also been a Management Consultant for the National Trust in Wales.

== Political career ==
=== Local politics ===
He was a Carmarthen Town Councillor and Mayor of the town from 2001–2002.

=== National politics ===
Gruffydd stood for the Carmarthen West and South Pembrokeshire UK Parliament constituency at the 2001 general election, coming third, and for the Carmarthen West and South Pembrokeshire Welsh Assembly constituency at the 2003 Assembly elections, coming second. He then stood for Clwyd West seat at the 2010 General Election, but was not elected.

He has served as a Member of the Senedd (MS) for the North Wales region since 2011. In the 2011 Senedd election, he was returned as one of the four members of the Senedd for the North Wales region, being the first placed candidate on the Plaid Cymru list.

In October 2018, Llyr Gruffydd took on the Plaid Cymru role for the environment and rural affairs.

Gruffydd is currently Cabinet Minister for Rural Resilience and Sustainability. He previously served as Plaid Cymru's Shadow Minister for rural affairs. He also served as the party's spokesperson for finance & local government as well as education in previous parliaments. Prior to the 2026 election, he was the chair of the Senedd committee on climate change, environment and infrastructure, and a member of the committee for scrutiny of the First Minister, and the Llywydd's committee. He also chaired the cross-party group on horseracing, as well as being a member of cross-party groups on mental health, North Wales, public transport, renewable and low carbon energy, rural growth, shooting and conservation, small shops, sport and tourism.

=== Interim leadership of Plaid Cymru ===
On 11 May 2023 he was nominated as the interim leader of Plaid Cymru following the resignation of Adam Price. He served as Plaid Cymru's interim leader from 16 May until 16 June, when Rhun ap Iorwerth was elected unopposed as the new party leader.

During his leadership, Gruffydd maintained the co-operation agreement between Welsh Labour and Plaid Cymru. He was also critical of the party's inaction on misconduct within the party, which led to Price's resignation and his interim leadership.

In the 2026 Senedd election, he was elected as an MS for the Clwyd constituency.

== Personal life ==
Llyr Gruffydd was born and raised in Carmarthenshire and now lives in Ruthin, Denbighshire.

He is the father of four children.

Senedd
Preceded by Janet Ryder	Member of the Senedd for North Wales; 2011–2026	Succeeded by Seat abolished
Preceded by Seat created	Member of the Senedd for Clwyd; 2026–present	Incumbent
Party political offices
Preceded by Adam Price	Leader of Plaid Cymru; Acting; May–June 2023	Succeeded by Rhun ap Iorwerth
