= Education in the United Kingdom =

Education in United Kingdom
National education budget (2015)
- Budget: 6.6% of GDP

General details
- Primary languages: English, Irish, Scottish Gaelic, Welsh

Literacy (2020)
- Total: 99%
- Male: 99%
- Female: 99%

Attainment
- Secondary diploma: 88%
- Post-secondary diploma: 45.7%

Education in the United Kingdom is a devolved matter, with each of the countries of the United Kingdom having separate systems under separate governments. The UK Government is responsible for England, whilst the Scottish Government, the Welsh Government and the Northern Ireland Executive are responsible for Scotland, Wales and Northern Ireland, respectively.

For details of education in each country, see:

- Education in England
- Education in Northern Ireland
- Education in Scotland
- Education in Wales

In 2018, the Programme for International Student Assessment, coordinated by the OECD, ranked the overall knowledge and skills of British 15-year-olds as 13th in the world in reading, literacy, mathematics, and science. The average British student scored 503.7, compared with the OECD average of 493.

In 2014, the country spent 6.6% of its GDP on all levels of education – 1.4 percentage points above the OECD average of 5.2%. In 2017, 45.7% of British people aged 25 to 64 had attended some form of post-secondary education. Of British people aged 25 to 64, 22.6% had attained a bachelor's degree or higher, whilst 52% of British people aged 25 to 34 had attended some form of tertiary education, compared with the OECD average of 44%.

== Timeline of introduction of Compulsory Education ==
- 1872: Scotland (Education (Scotland) Act 1872)
- 1880: England, Wales
- 1892: Northern Ireland (As part of pre-partition Ireland)
- 1917: Gibraltar
- 1926: Northern Ireland (Post partition)

== History ==
For details of the history of education in each country, see:

- History of education in England
- History of education in Scotland
- History of education in Wales

Public schools, and the universities of Oxford and Cambridge, for example through English public school football games and the Cambridge rules established in 1848, played a significant role in the development of modern sports, which shaped British sports that spread worldwide.

== Stages ==
In each country there are five stages of education: early years, primary, secondary, further education (FE) and higher education (HE). The law states that full-time education is compulsory for all children between the ages of 5 (4 in Northern Ireland) and 16. In England, compulsory education or training was extended to 18 in 2015. Before they reach compulsory school age, children can be educated at nursery; the four governments all provide universal funding for children from the age of three years old or younger.

Further education is non-compulsory, and covers courses equivalent to qualifications available in secondary education as well as advanced education which can be taken at higher education institutions (HEIs). The fifth stage, higher education, is study beyond A-levels or BTECs (and their equivalent), or Highers in Scotland, which, for most full-time students, takes place in universities.

The National Curriculum, established in 1988, provides a framework for education in England between the ages of 5 and 16. Although the curriculum is compulsory, some private schools, home educators, academies and free schools design their own curricula. Following devolution in 1999, the Welsh Government took responsibility for education in Wales and the curriculum began to differ from that of England. The National Curriculum for Wales was established and is now being succeeded by the Curriculum for Wales.

In Scotland, the equivalent is the Curriculum for Excellence. Scotland's qualifications system of National 4/5s, Highers and Advanced Highers are very similar to Advanced Subsidiary (AS) and Advanced Level (A2) courses in England.

The Northern Ireland Curriculum is a separate system.

Equivalent qualifications across UK nations
England	Scotland	Wales	Northern Ireland
GCSE (grades 1-3)	National 4	GCSE (grades D-G)	GCSE (grades D-G)
GCSE (grades 4-9)	National 5	GCSE (grades C-A*)	GCSE (grades C-A*)
AS-level	Higher	AS-level	AS-level
A-level	Advanced Higher	A-level	A-level

== Further education ==
Further education (FE) refers to post-secondary education in England and Wales. FE may include the study of apprenticeships, A-levels, BTEC, International Baccalaureate, NVQ or others, ranging from entry level to the highest level (Level 3, equivalent to A-level) and aim to prepare students for higher education. The sixth form is one type of FE, which includes post-16 study that is undertaken after completing GCSE (General Certificate of Secondary Education). Sixth form may be offered by sixth form colleges or by schools which teach the 11–18 age-range and have an attached sixth form. Further education colleges generally provide a wider curriculum and have a wider range of options for FE, including vocational forms of education (such as NVQs). Tertiary colleges provide both academic and vocational courses.

== Higher education ==
In the United Kingdom, higher education is offered by universities and other institutions (colleges, institutes, schools, and academies) and includes both research-oriented and higher professional education. Universities provide programmes that lead to a degree (bachelor's, master's, or doctorate) and non-degree programmes that lead to a vocational qualification such as a certificate or diploma. British higher education is valued around the globe for its quality and rigorous academic standards. Several British universities are ranked among the top universities in the world, including the University of Cambridge, the University of Oxford, Imperial College London, and UCL.

=== Entry qualifications ===
In 2023, most students who sat for GCSEs undertook 9 subjects. In 2023, the most common combination of three subjects that was undertaken by students included: 1) English Language, 2) English Literature and 3) Mathematics, with 61.2% of students studying these three subjects in combination.

Sitting the exam represents the end of 11 years of mandatory education. A General Certificate of Secondary Education or National 5 in Scotland, is awarded for each subject passed and World Education Services issues a high school diploma after the evaluation of a minimum of three GCSEs. Pre-university education in the United Kingdom is a two-year senior secondary programme that leads to a new round of examinations, the General Certificate of Education, Advanced Level (A-levels), or the Advanced Highers in Scotland. As with the GCSE, students who sit for the exam choose the subjects and the number of advanced examinations. In 2022, students who sat for A-Levels averagely undertook 2.64 subjects. WES awards undergraduate credit based on the nature and number of subjects passed. Each university has their own set of admission policies and the minimum entry requirements for each particular higher education programme that they offer. The A-Level is an entry qualification for universities in the United Kingdom and many other universities across the world. Students that are interested in pursuing higher education will usually enrol in pre-university and further education programmes.

=== Vocational ===
Technical and vocational education in the United Kingdom is introduced during the secondary school years and goes on until further and higher education. Secondary vocational education is also known as further education. It is separate from secondary education and does not belong to the category of higher education. Further education incorporates vocational oriented education as well as a combination of general secondary education. Students can also go on to a further education college to prepare themselves for the Vocational Certificate of Education (VCE), which is similar to the A-levels. Major provider of vocational qualifications in the United Kingdom include the City and Guilds of London Institute and Edexcel. Higher National Certificates and Higher National Diplomas typically require 1 and 2 years of full-time study and credit from either HNE or Diplomas can be transferred toward an undergraduate degree. Along with the HNC and HND, students who are interested in other vocational qualifications may pursue a Foundation degree, which is a qualification that trains people to be highly skilled technicians. The National Apprenticeship Service also offers vocational education where people at ages of 16 and older enter apprenticeships in order to learn a skilled trade. There are over 60 different certifications can be obtained through an apprenticeship, which typically lasts from 1 to 3 years. Trades apprentices receive paid wages during training and spend one day at school and the rest in the workplace to hone their skills.

T Levels are a technical qualification being introduced between Autumn 2020 and 2023. They are intended to provide the knowledge and experience needed for learners to progress to skilled employment, further study or a higher apprenticeship.

== Inequality ==
In 2018 The Guardian commented that successful schools tend to choose pupils from high–achieving backgrounds. Pupils from disadvantaged backgrounds, and challenging pupils, tend to be concentrated in schools that do less well in inspections; also that children from prosperous backgrounds are more likely to be in good or outstanding schools, while disadvantaged children are more likely to be in inadequate schools. The inequality gap as of 2015 is closing with more students in good or outstanding schools from all social backgrounds.

A 2016 report by the Equality and Human Rights Commission said that racial inequality exists in the Great Britain education system. It was found that 6% of Black school leavers went on to attend a Russell Group university, compared with 12% of mixed race and Asian school leavers, and 11% of White school leavers. In 2009, it was found that White students' predicted A-Level grades were 53% accurate, whilst Black students' received predicted grades that were 39.1% accurate. Black students are also the most likely to receive under-predicted grades by their teachers. It was found that 7.1% of Black students received higher actual grades compared to 6.6% of White students, 6.5% of Asian students and 6.1% of Mixed students. In 2018, of all teachers in state-funded schools in England, 14.1% were from BAME groups. 33.5% of primary school and 31.3% of secondary school pupils in England were from BAME groups.

== Funding ==
In 2015/16, the UK spent £3.2 billion on early years education, £27.7 billion on primary education, £38.2 billion on secondary education and £5.9 billion on tertiary education. In total, the UK spent £83.4 billion on education (includes £8.4 billion on other categories).

== International students ==
Schools and universities in Britain are popular destinations for international students. The country's universities and colleges have educated many heads of state and government around the world, rivalled only by the United States.

== See also ==
- Education administration in the United Kingdom
- Education of the British royal family
- Examination boards in the United Kingdom
- Faith school
- Grammar school
- Preparatory school
- Public school
- Special education in the United Kingdom
- Teachers' trade unions in the United Kingdom
