= National Curriculum for Wales =

The National Curriculum for Wales may refer to:

- National Curriculum for Wales (2008 to 2026) - the curriculum currently being phased out
- Curriculum for Wales (2022 to present) - the curriculum currently being phased in
