= National Curriculum for Wales (2008–2026) =

Curriculum used in Welsh schools

The National Curriculum was first introduced in Wales as part of the Education Reform Act 1988, alongside the equivalent curriculum for England. Following devolution in 1999, education became a matter for the Welsh Government. Consequently, some elements of the system began to differ from England. This article covers the curriculum as it existed from 2008 until the formal introduction of a new Curriculum for Wales between 2022 and 2026.

== Background ==
The Education Reform Act 1988 introduced a standardised National Curriculum in England and Wales. The curriculum specified what subjects should be taught and what standard children were expected to reach by different ages. It grouped school years between the ages of five and sixteen into four "key stages". According to one summary of the act:

There would be three 'core subjects' (mathematics, English and science); six foundation subjects (history, geography, technology, music, art and physical education); plus a modern foreign language at key stages 3 and 4 (3(1-2)). Schools in Welsh-speaking areas of Wales would also teach Welsh.

In Wales, Welsh language lessons became a universal part of the curriculum for children up to the age of fourteen in 1990. In 1993, the Developing a Curriculum Cymreig, Advisory Paper was published with the intention of adding more of an emphasis on the cultural life and society of Wales into the curriculum. In 1995 the Curriculum Cymreig was given statutory status in every subject. However, a report produced by Estyn in 2001 suggested that the success of this endeavour had been quite limited and varied significantly between subjects, schools and regions.

Devolution created the potential for further divergence between England and Wales. Changes in the years immediately following devolution included compulsory study of the Welsh language for students up to the age of 16 and the removal of statutory testing for children in the middle years of their schooling (though it was later reintroduced). Though in general, the basic structure of the education system remained the same. The Foundation Phase, a new play-based curriculum was introduced for children aged three to seven from 2008 onwards. Curriculum materials more broadly were also updated that year. The 2008 curriculum is still being used by some learners in Wales until the Curriculum for Wales (2022–present) is fully implemented by the 2026-2027 academic year.

== Structure ==
The curriculum divided schooling into four phases, each relating to pupils of different ages. Key Stages 2 to 4 mirrored those used in England, with pupils in Key Stage 2 being aged 7–11, in Key Stage 3 aged 11–14 and Key Stage 4 representing the GCSE years of 14- to 16-year-olds. For children aged between 3 and 7, the key stage was known as the Foundation Phase. Within each phase or key stage, certain subjects were set out in statute as part of the national curriculum.

=== Foundation phase ===
Within the foundation phase, the curriculum was set out in seven areas of learning:

- Personal and Social Development, Well-being and Cultural Diversity
- Language, Literacy and Communication Skills
- Mathematical Development
- Welsh Language Development
- Knowledge and Understanding of the World
- Physical Development
- Creative Development

=== Key Stages 2, 3 and 4 ===
The following subjects were statutory in each of the later key stages:

	Key Stage 2	Key Stage 3	Key Stage 4
Age	7–11	11–14	14–16
Year groups	3–6	7–9	10–11
English	✓	✓	✓
Welsh	✓	✓	✓
Mathematics	✓	✓	✓
Science	✓	✓	✓
Design and Technology	✓	✓	
Information and Communication Technology	✓	✓	
History	✓	✓	
Geography	✓	✓	
Art and Design	✓	✓	
Music	✓	✓	
Physical Education	✓	✓	✓
Modern Foreign Language		✓	

== Replacement ==
In 2014, the Welsh Government commissioned Graham Donaldson a professor at the University of Glasgow who had worked on reforms to Education in Scotland to conduct a report into reforming the curriculum in Wales. He recommended the following year a variety of changes including a greater emphasis on computer skills, giving schools more control over what they taught and creating more of a sense of natural progression through school. The Welsh Education Minister promised a few months later that the report would be implemented in full within eight years. The curriculum was initially planned to begin being taught in 2021 though this was later delayed until 2022.

The new system would be introduced first for children in primary school and their first year of secondary school before being rolled out further as that age cohort progressed towards the end of their schooling. Meaning that some students would still be enrolled on the old system until 2026. However, due to the COVID-19 pandemic schools were allowed to delay teaching the new curriculum in the first and second years of secondary school to 2023.

== See also ==
- Education in Wales
- Education of Welsh History
- Welsh-medium education
- Education in the United Kingdom

=== Other UK curricula ===
- National Curriculum for England - England
- Northern Ireland Curriculum - Northern Ireland
- Curriculum for excellence - Scotland
