= 2021 Welsh Labour–Plaid Cymru agreement =

2021–2024 Welsh political agreement

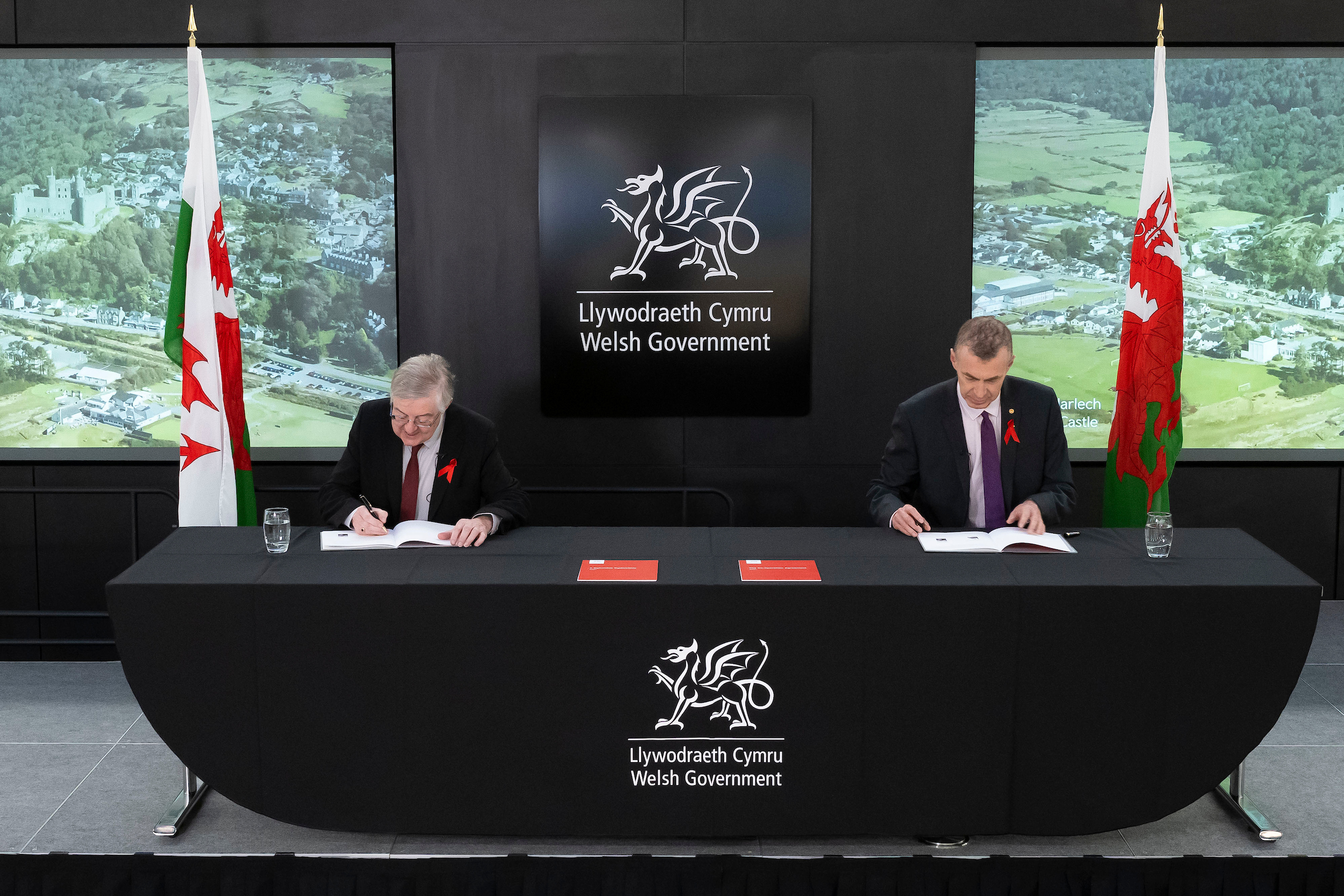
Welsh Labour leader Mark Drakeford and Plaid Cymru leader Adam Price sign the agreement, December 2021

In December 2021, the Welsh Labour government and Plaid Cymru signed a three-year co-operation agreement, where the two parties agreed to work together in 46 policy areas. The agreement was not a coalition or confidence and supply agreement; Plaid Cymru remained in opposition but appointed advisers to offices of the Welsh Government.

It was announced in November 2021, by the leaders of the two parties, Mark Drakeford, leader of Welsh Labour and First Minister, and Adam Price, leader of Plaid Cymru, following months of talks. The agreement was ratified by both parties, voted for by Plaid Cymru's party membership, but criticised by the Welsh Conservatives and some Welsh Labour representatives.

Plaid Cymru leader Rhun ap Iorwerth announced that he was ending the deal in May 2024, citing donations that First Minister Vaughan Gething had received during the initial 2024 Welsh Labour leadership election among the reasons for ending the agreement early.

== Background ==
Since the establishment of the Senedd, its usual largest party, the Welsh Labour party, has not gained an outright majority in the devolved parliament. To allow past government plans to pass, formal coalition agreements had been agreed, previously with the Liberal Democrats, Plaid Cymru or individual members including Dafydd Elis-Thomas and Liberal Democrat Kirsty Williams. Confidence and supply agreements have also been used. The 2021 agreement is not a coalition or supply and confidence agreement, and described by the parties as a "bespoke agreement".

Previously, the Welsh nationalist party, Plaid Cymru and Welsh Labour had a coalition agreement, One Wales between 2007 and 2011, and in 2016 agreed to a "compact" deal, following that year's assembly elections.

Following the 2021 Senedd election, the Labour Welsh Government won 30 of 60 seats, one below an absolute majority, forming a minority government. Plaid Cymru won thirteen seats. Following the election Welsh Labour announced it planned to govern without any formal assistance with members from other parties. But Welsh academic, Laura McAllister, argued a deal with another party was needed if Welsh Labour wanted to pass big or radical legislation through the Senedd.

== Agreement ==
=== Initial talks ===
Talks were conducted over summer 2021, with the two parties publicly reporting they were in talks in September 2021. Reports of the two close to reaching a final agreement were raised on 19 November 2021, although details were not provided as it still required ratification by both parties.

When reports of talks were raised in September 2021, BBC News stated the two parties are likely to agree on Senedd reform, social care, council tax reform, free school meals and tackling second homes, but disagree on Welsh independence.

The Welsh Liberal Democrats, who have one MS, just enough to achieve a working majority with Welsh Labour, was not involved in any talks with the Welsh Government, despite a previous coalition between the Liberal Democrats and Welsh Labour. The leader of the Welsh Liberal Democrats, Jane Dodds MS, said not being in talks was "right". UK Liberal Democrats leader Ed Davey, supported the Welsh branch not being in talks, allowing Dodds, the party's sole Welsh MS, to be an independent opposition voice, and said a deal was never proposed to the party by the Welsh Government.

The executive committees of Welsh Labour and Plaid Cymru approved a deal for the two to cooperate in the Senedd on 21 November 2021. Although further support from Plaid Cymru's party membership was still required at the time.

=== Announcement and ratification ===
The agreement was formally announced on 22 November 2021, by both leaders in front of the Senedd building. Welsh Labour leader and first minister Mark Drakeford stated the agreement would bring a "stable Senedd" which can deliver "radical change and reform". Plaid Cymru leader Adam Price, called it "historic" for Wales, and allowed the party to both push its main priorities and criticise Labour on issues not in the agreement. At Plaid Cymru's conference on 26 November, Price described the agreement as "a new kind of politics" and a "down-payment [...] on independence", that allowed the party to become a "co-opposition party" rather than just a traditional opposition party. The agreement involved only Welsh Labour government ministers and not the party's backbench members, according to those backbench members.

The Plaid Cymru membership ratified the agreement during their annual conference on 27 November 2021 after 94% of the party's members supported the agreement, and on 1 December 2021, the agreement came into force after the two parties officially signed the agreement.

Plaid Cymru can appoint special advisers to work within offices of the Welsh Government, but as it is not a coalition, no members of Plaid Cymru's Senedd Group can join the Welsh Government as ministers or deputies. Plaid Cymru would appoint a designated lead member for the agreement. While committees formed of Welsh Government ministers and designated members of Plaid Cymru would be formed to agree on issues covered in the agreement. Funding for the agreement were made part of the Welsh Government's budget. The Welsh Government stated Plaid Cymru can contribute to Welsh Government press releases, and there would be regular joint media briefings with leaders of the two parties.

The agreement was described by the leader of the Scottish National Party, Nicola Sturgeon, as grown up politics. While the Welsh Liberal Democrats commended it, the Conservatives condemned the deal. UK Labour leader Keir Starmer, stated in September 2021 during the initial talks, that he would not interfere with them, although when the final deal was agreed, Starmer nor the UK party commented on the deal at the time. Some senior Labour MP's in Wales did not comment on the agreement, a week after it was announced, with only four Labour MP's in Wales commenting with different amounts of praise. Plaid Cymru MP, Liz Saville Roberts, argued that the deal signified a divergence between Welsh Labour and UK Labour, and that Welsh Labour was more closer to Plaid Cymru than UK Labour, as it agreed with Plaid Cymru over more policies, while UK Labour ignored them.

By June 2023, the agreement's designated members from Plaid Cymru were Siân Gwenllian and Cefin Campbell.

The agreement lasts three years and involved the two parties working together in "46 policy areas". The agreement was set to end in December 2024, with Plaid Cymru stating in October 2023, that it will not be extended. In December 2023, Mark Drakeford clarified that as part of the deal Plaid Cymru could command influence over the Welsh Government's budget, beyond the agreed areas.

=== Calls for termination ===
In May 2023, Ken Skates, Labour MS and former Welsh Government economy minister, called for the agreement to end, following a report into inappropriate behaviour tolerated within Plaid Cymru. Skates states he wouldn't like to work "with bullies, misogynists or anyone who discriminates against others". Following the report, Mark Drakeford, Welsh Labour leader, suggested the agreement is under review following the developments within Plaid Cymru.

In December 2023, David Rees, Labour MS, questioned whether the co-operation deal was being prioritised for funding over other parts of the Welsh Government's programme. First Minister, Mark Drakeford, stated that funding commitments to the deal were "ring-fenced", but Plaid Cymru can influence the budget, while Plaid Cymru leader Rhun ap Iorwerth, stated the deal's commitments were "a small percentage" of the £20 billion budget.

In March 2024, Plaid Cymru leader Rhun ap Iorwerth, stated that the remaining length of the agreement should be discussed, following the campaign and subsequent election of Vaughan Gething as Labour leader and first minister.

In April 2024, calls were made for Plaid Cymru to end the agreement, due to Labour defending a £4.5 million reduction of the budget to Amgueddfa Cymru – Museum Wales, with the museum stating they may have to close National Museum Cardiff as a result.

=== End ===
On 17 May 2024, Rhun ap Iorwerth announced that Plaid Cymru had withdrawn from the co-operation agreement with Welsh Labour, saying "I remain deeply concerned that the First Minister has failed to pay back the £200,000 donation to his leadership campaign from a company convicted of environmental offences, and believe it demonstrates a significant lack of judgment." First Minister Vaughan Gething responded by saying that "The co-operation agreement was about mature politics, working together on areas where we agree. While it was always a time-limited agreement, we are disappointed Plaid Cymru has decided to walk away from their opportunity to deliver for the people of Wales."

== Agreed policies ==
The 46 policy areas, under four rough categories, in which the two parties aim to implement for Wales are as follows:

=== Social ===
- Free school meals to all pupils in primary schools during the agreement.
- Free childcare for children up to two-years-old, with a focus on Welsh-medium education.
- Look into creating a "National Care Service", by creating an "expert group" to look into the proposal.
- Tackle the second homes crisis and unaffordable housing, using the property, land planning, and taxation systems. This could include proposals on a cap on second/holiday homes, increase common ownership, a holiday let licensing scheme, providing greater powers to local authorities to allow them charge council tax premiums or higher taxes, or allow local authority mortgages.
- Create "Unnos" – National construction company, to increase the supply of affordable and social housing.
- Reform building safety system – introduce Welsh Building Safety Fund's second phase.
- White paper on proposals for the "right to adequate housing", the role of a fair rents (rent control) system in the private sector to make homes more affordable, and new general approaches to increasing house affordability.
- End homelessness – reform housing law, enact a "Renting Homes Act", providing "greater security" to those renting, and implement recommendations of the Homeless Action Group.
- Reform Council Tax to "make it fairer".
- Increase procurement in the Welsh public sector (from existing 52%), by setting targets. Analyse the supply chains of the public sector, and the promotion of Welsh produce and services.
- Introduce local tourism levies.

=== Energy, Environment and Transport ===
- Seek independent advice on actions needed to reach net zero by 2035 (current target is 2050). This would involve analysing the societal and economic impact and how to mitigate any adverse effects to share costs and benefits. Supporting devolution of further powers to reach net zero, such as devolving the Crown Estate.
- Create "Ynni Cymru" – Welsh publicly owned energy company, to increase renewable energy that is owned by communities, within two years of the agreement.
- Through Transport for Wales, look into North–South Wales transport links, and protecting possible travel corridors along Wales' west coast (the agreement did not specify a railway). Continue development of regional metros to encourage increased use of public transport. Push TfW to develop plans for a North West Wales integrated transport system.
- Set targets and utilise an "environmental governance body" to help protect and restore the biodiversity of Wales.
- Encourage farmers to create woodlands on less productive land, through agro-foresty. Support farmers through a sustainable farming scheme, and looking how to draw investment while securing local ownership and control.
- Work with farming community to improve air and water quality. Using the Water Resources Regulations 2021 to target polluting activities.
- Independent review of the "local government section 19" and the reports of Natural Resources Wales into the 2020–21 winter extreme floods, and act on the review's recommendations.
- More investment in the management and mitigation of flooding. Plan response to increased flooding risk. Through National Infrastructure Commission for Wales assess how to minimise the likelihood of flooding nationwide of businesses, homes and infrastructure, and how to minimise it by 2050.
- Transition period during reform of farm payments into the Sustainable Farming Scheme, through the current Senedd term and beyond.
- Create a community food strategy, encouraging locally sourced food production and supply in Wales.

=== Government, Media and Education ===
- Reform the Senedd – increase size to 80–100 members, a more proportional voting system, and introduce statutory gender quotas.
- Support the Independent Commission on Wales' Constitution Future.
- Look into creating a "Broadcasting and Communications Authority for Wales", a shadow body which would specifically support Welsh-language digital media, and media plurality. Support devolution of broadcasting and communication.
- Fund new and existing Welsh journalism enterprises.
- Build on Arfor pilot, which promotes entrepreneurship, business growth, resilience of the community and the Welsh language. Add a second phase of Arfor with local government and contact the OECD in the development of local government models to allow authorities to work together in West Wales and in the South Wales Valleys to tackle inequalities between the poor and rich areas of Wales.
- Look into establishing a "National School for Government" and how it contributes to a "One Wales Public Service" principle.
- Ongoing reviews of regional partnerships, such as the Corporate Joint Committees, to ensure efficiency and whether changes are needed in their operation.
- Co-operate with the Office for Budget Responsibility, the Wales Governance Centre, and others in understanding devolved public financing and the needs of Wales' public services into the future, by addressing possible future funding gaps, how to grow Wales' tax base and any implications from the Constitutional Commission's recommendations.
- Develop a model of supply teaching that is more sustainable, centred on fair work, possible led by local authorities or schools. Oppose the for-profit model in supply teaching and looked after children.
- Aim to reform school term dates to fit family life or employment patterns. Explore school day reform to allow time for a wider range of culturally-accessible activities and opportunities.
- Reform educational qualifications, lining up with Wales' new curriculum, focusing on experiences and wellbeing. Expand range of vocational qualifications that are made-in-Wales.
- Forward the Tertiary Education and Research Bill, introduce a mission-based national innovation strategy. Promote innovation through the Commission for Tertiary Education and Research.

=== Culture and Language ===
- Develop a culture strategy, promoting diversity, the Welsh language and Wales' arts, culture and heritage, while meeting the Well-being of Future Generations (Wales) Act 2015. Develop the proposed national contemporary art gallery for Wales.
- Increase the school teaching of Welsh history in the new Curriculum for Wales.
- Prosiect 2050 – Promote the Welsh language to be used daily in more places. Support Welsh Government sponsored bodies, Wales' local authorities and the Welsh civil service to use Welsh.
- Introduce the Welsh Language Education Bill, alongside non-legislative work, to strengthen the use of Welsh in educational strategy plans. To incentivise and increase the ambition for more of the education workforce to teach and work in Welsh, as well as in all education settings. Establish a Welsh language learning continuum and enable existing schools to become of a higher category Welsh language learning.
- Reduce obstacles in the setting of Welsh Language Standards, in communication with the Welsh Language Commissioner. Make the implementation process for standards more efficient while not weakening them. Implement standards on health sector regulators, public transport, water companies, newly established bodies that are outside the existing standards regime, and start applying them to housing associations by the end of the Senedd term. Fully implement the Welsh Language (Wales) Measure 2011 and list the highly prioritised standards under the measure's schedules in need of further rollout beyond the agreement's tenure.
- Promote and safeguard Welsh place names
- Invest in Coleg Cymraeg Cenedlaethol and in the National Centre for Learning Welsh, to increase Welsh-medium apprenticeships and Welsh-medium further education, and to provide free Welsh learning to 16–25 year olds.
- Increase the opportunities for learners from a disadvantaged background to participate in the Seren Network. Offer summer schools at Welsh universities for the network's foundation learners. Expand the partnership with Aberystwyth University and Cardiff University and develop new pilot trials at other Welsh institutions.
- Support devolution of welfare administration, and the accompanied financial support. Investigate the infrastructure required for its implementation if devolved.
- Trial community facilities, being run by trained third sector staff which have clear referral pathways into services of the NHS if required, to use the sanctuary model. To support young people with urgent mental health issues, issues to their mental wellbeing or in a crisis, and would take place on open evenings and weekends.
- Improvement disabled peoples' rights and tackle the continued inequalities they face. Commit to a social model of disability. Ensure the Disability Task Force is successful.
- Publish the Race Equality Action Plan, working with communities and bodies such as the courts and Wales' police to develop the plan and tackle systemic and institutionalised racism. Support the devolution of justice and policing.
- Publish the LGTBQ+ Action Plan. Support devolving powers to protect and improve the lives of Trans people.

== Criticism ==
Following the announcement of the agreement, Welsh Conservative MS Darren Millar, said the deal "fails to deliver on the priorities of the people of Wales", criticising the deal's lack of commitments on tackling the crisis in NHS Wales, issues with Welsh infrastructure and Wales' economic performance, and the deal was a "move towards Welsh independence". Concerns over the lack of healthcare measures were also raised by the Liberal Democrats. On 1 December, UK Conservative Secretary of State for Wales, Simon Hart, called it an "absolute travesty", that allows Plaid Cymru to "claim credit" for government policies while also acting as an opposition party. In October 2023, Cefin Campbell, the deal's co-designated Plaid MS, stated that Plaid Cymru should be allowed to claim credit for the deal's policies, such as free school meals, as it was in their manifesto but not Labour's.

The Welsh Conservatives described the deal in December 2021 as undermining the work of the Welsh parliament. The Conservatives questioned Plaid Cymru's opposition status, and that for the government to be properly scrutinised, changes are to be made. If Plaid Cymru is considered as "effectively in government" rather than an opposition, one of the parliament's two presiding officers, Elin Jones of Plaid Cymru has to be from an opposition party instead. However, the rules specify a party's "executive role" defined as having government ministers which Plaid Cymru do not have as part of the agreement.

In December 2021, Labour MS Alun Davies, stated that while the deal "might not be a coalition, [...] it looks like one", and that Plaid Cymru is "clearly part" of the Welsh Government. This was rejected by Welsh business minister Lesley Griffiths who stated "this is not a coalition", as well as Plaid Cymru. Davies stated that backbench members of Welsh Labour had not been party to the agreement, which involved only Welsh Labour ministers. Rhun ap Iorwerth, Plaid Cymru MS, did say he would prefer a coalition agreement. Hefin David, Labour MS, called on the presiding officer to make appointees of Plaid Cymru to also be called to answer questions in the Senedd, while also supporting the deal.

In July 2022, the Welsh Conservatives claimed that Plaid Cymru leader, Adam Price failed to challenge the Labour first minister, Mark Drakeford because of the deal. Plaid Cymru stated, they do oppose the government "strongly" on issues outside the agreement.

In February 2023, Hefin David, Labour MS, criticised the agreement, saying it gave Plaid Cymru "power without responsibility". During the debate on the Welsh Government's budget, Plaid Cymru abstained to allow the budget to pass, but criticised ministers for not raising income tax to increase NHS funding. David argued for a formal coalition government or a confidence and supply agreement over the current deal, which David described as "worst of both worlds".

In March 2023, Adam Price MS, Plaid Cymru leader, said he would prefer a coalition government over a co-operation deal, as it would allow Plaid Cymru to be in government to govern Wales and move forward in achieving Welsh independence.
