= Humanism in Wales =

Humanism in Wales is presence of humanist thought and organised humanist activity in Wales, originating during the renaissance and continuing to this day. Humanism in the Welsh context has been shaped by wider European intellectual movements, the cultural and linguistic traditions of Wales, and modern social and political developments, especially the rise in atheism and agnosticism and its effect on public views on the role of religion in education.

== History ==
=== Early influences ===
Humanist ideas reached Wales through the broader currents of Renaissance humanism in Britain during the late medieval and early modern periods. Welsh scholars educated in England and continental Europe encountered classical learning and humanist philosophy, particularly during the 15th and 16th centuries. These ideas influenced Welsh intellectual life through education, translation, and literature, although they often coexisted with strong religious traditions.

=== The Enlightenment and Nonconformity ===
During the 18th and 19th centuries, Wales experienced significant religious and social change. The growth of Nonconformist Christianity, particularly following the Welsh revival of Methodism, reshaped Welsh religious life and culture. The expansion of Sunday schools and circulating schools, often conducted in the Welsh language, contributed significantly to rising levels of literacy and popular education. These developments fostered a culture that encouraged personal study, debate, and moral reflection. While not explicitly humanist in the modern sense, this environment placed increasing emphasis on reason, individual moral responsibility, and social reform. Some Welsh thinkers and reformers engaged with secular, deist, and freethought ideas associated with the Enlightenment, particularly in urban and industrialised areas of south Wales. Notable figures such as the deist philosophers Thomas Morgan and David Williams, and the moral philosopher and political reformer Richard Price, contributed to wider debates on reason, ethics, and religious authority.

=== Modern humanism in Wales ===
The modern Humanist movement in Wales developed primarily in the mid to late 20th century, with the formation of local groups and the increasing visibility of non-religious worldviews. Humanist organisations in Wales have since sought to articulate a distinctively Welsh expression of Humanism, reflecting national cultural and linguistic contexts while remaining part of wider British and international Humanist networks. Since the early twentieth century, changes such as the disestablishment of the Church in Wales have reduced the formal role of the church in governance and contributed to the development of a more secular public framework in which different religions and non-religious beliefs are treated on an equal basis. The Senedd was the first government of a constituent country of the UK to be created on secular ideals. Many Welsh humanists in the twentieth and twenty-first centuries have contributed to improvements in society, such as in politics, education and literature. One of the most influential was Aneurin Bevan, who was born in Tredegar. He helped to establish the National Health Service (NHS), thereby enabling millions of people throughout the UK to access medical care. Millicent Mackenzie was born in Bristol, but she spent most of her working life in Wales. She was the first female professor in Wales, and also the first woman to stand for Parliament in Wales. She became a Vice President of the 'Union of Ethical Societies', a forerunner of 'Humanists UK.

== Organisation ==
Humanism in Wales is principally represented by 'Wales Humanists', the Welsh section of the UK-wide charity Humanists UK. Wales Humanists campaigns for the rights and representation of non-religious people and promotes Humanism, secularism, and equal treatment regardless of belief within Welsh public life. The organisation engages with the Welsh Government and public bodies on issues including education, public policy, and freedom of belief. Alongside the national organisation, a number of local Humanist groups operate across Wales. These include 'Cardiff Humanists', founded in 1966, which is one of the longest-established Humanist groups in the country. Local groups typically organise discussion meetings, lectures, social events and community activities, providing opportunities for Humanists to meet and engage at a local level.

== Humanism and education ==
Humanism in Wales has been closely associated with debates over education, particularly religious education and collective worship in state-funded schools. The Welsh Government’s reform of the national curriculum replaced Religious Education (RE) with Religion, Values and Ethics (RVE), a statutory subject required for all pupils that must be taught in a Religious pluralism way reflecting both religious and non-religious philosophical convictions, including humanism. Wales Humanists and related organisations have campaigned for the repeal of the statutory requirement for daily collective worship in all state schools, arguing that assemblies should be inclusive of all pupils regardless of their religious or non-religious beliefs. Humanist organisations have also campaigned for Religion, Values and Ethics (RVE) classes to include humanism alongside religious worldviews and for humanist representation on local education advisory councils responsible for RVE policy, reflecting the diversity of beliefs in Welsh society. The development of the Curriculum for Wales in the 21st century, including the introduction of Religion, Values and Ethics (RVE), has provided a framework in which non-religious philosophical perspectives, including humanism, may be studied alongside religious traditions. Humanists UK developed resources for teaching Humanism in Welsh schools post-Curriculum reform. Third-party advocacy groups such as the National Secular Society welcomed the inclusion of secular and non-religious worldviews in the RVE curriculum as a significant reform in how religion and belief are taught in schools, noting that the legislation explicitly requires a pluralistic approach to religion and belief education. Civil society coalitions campaigning for inclusive education across England and Wales, such as the Accord Coalition for Inclusive Education, also argue for state schools to be open and suitable for pupils of all religious and non-religious beliefs, reflecting wider debates about pluralism and equality in education policy.

== Demographics and social context ==
Census data in the United Kingdom has shown a growth in the number of people in Wales identifying as having no religion, to the point where most people under 74 ticked 'no religion' in the 2021 census.

== Geographical distribution ==
The graphic shows the distribution of 'irreligious' people across the UK in the 2021 census.

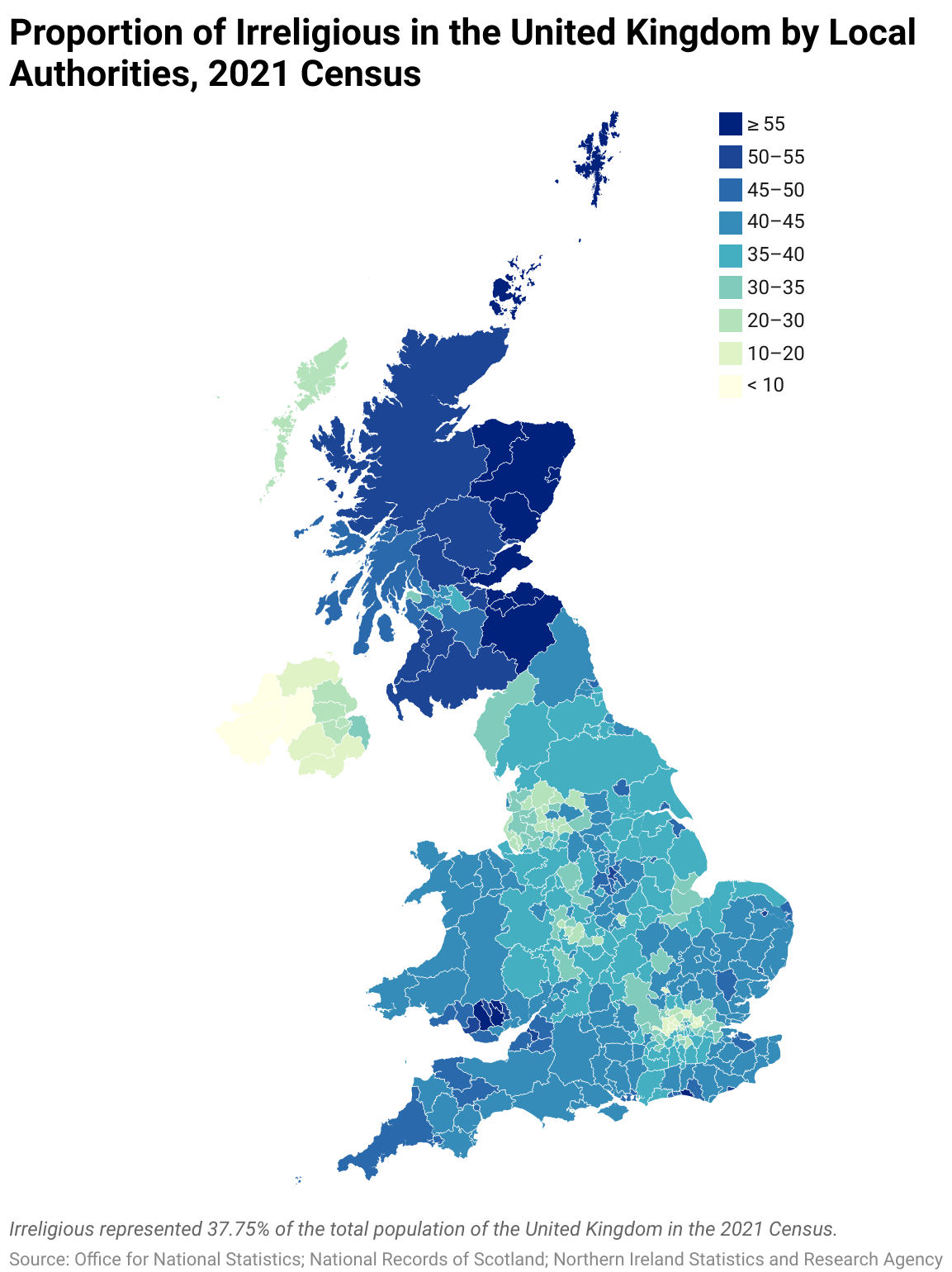
Distribution of Irreligious by local authority, 2021 census

== See also ==
- Religion in Wales
- Secularism in the United Kingdom
