= National Contemporary Art Gallery for Wales =

Proposed network of Welsh art galleries

- Oriel Celf Gyfoes Genedlaethol i Gymru (Welsh)
- Established: Proposed, delayed from 2024, part-cancelled
- Location: Across Wales
- Type: Proposed multi-venue contemporary art gallery brand
- Founders: Amgueddfa Cymru – Museum Wales; Arts Council of Wales; Welsh Government; National Library of Wales
- Website: celfarycyd.wales/ncagw/

The National Contemporary Art Gallery for Wales is a proposed branded network of art galleries distributing Wales' existing contemporary art collection. It is being developed by a partnership of Amgueddfa Cymru – Museum Wales, the Arts Council of Wales, the Welsh Government and the National Library of Wales. The proposal formed part of the 2021 Welsh Labour–Plaid Cymru agreement.

The gallery was also proposed to have a main site, alongside a network of existing venues, although due to budget constraints, a main site was scrapped by Cabinet Secretary for Culture and Social Justice, Lesley Griffiths, in July 2024.

== History ==
In 2008, a study was conducted to look into proposals for the feasibility of a National Gallery of Art for Wales, and what options were available for a National Centre for Contemporary Art. The study recommended the National Gallery of Art for Wales, to be based in a reconfigured site in Cathays Park, Cardiff, while the National Centre for Contemporary Art was recommended in the 2008 study to be housed in a "white box space" in either Riverside, Newport or in Swansea. The Welsh Government acted on neither of the 2008 study's recommendations.

In 2016, the Welsh Government and Plaid Cymru were negotiating the 2017–18 government budget, where it was agreed that as part of £3 million towards culture funding, feasibility studies into developing a "national art gallery and a football museum in North Wales" would be supported.

In 2017, the proposals for the gallery were first reported, with the government committed to funding a feasibility study with the support of Plaid Cymru. No location nor contents of the proposed gallery were stated, but it would be focused on "20th and 21st Century" Welsh art. In October 2017, a two-year budget deal between the Welsh Labour government and Plaid Cymru was agreed and included a commitment to a "national art museum".

In 2018, a feasibility report by Event, was said to have "showed significant support" for the proposal from artists, venues and other sector professionals. Following the report's release the Welsh Assembly were to hold a debate on the proposed gallery, as well as a proposed Football Museum for Wales. The report estimated a preliminary cost of the proposal would be between £50 million and £180 million. Although the study compared the costs of recent cultural projects such as V&A Dundee (£80 million), Courtauld Gallery (£50 million) and Factory, Manchester (£110 million).

The gallery was initially proposed to be housed in a new building. However, in 2018, the Welsh Government announced they were considering the gallery being housed in an existing building instead, even in the National Library of Wales, although the government stated all options were still to be considered. The 2018 feasibility report suggested that the gallery should first use no buildings at all, and instead be initially composed of works installed at sites across Wales. Then afterwards the gallery should be developed so it is shared between 6–8 existing galleries in Wales rather than being centrally located. Then a possible headquarters for the "decentralised gallery" may be built in the future after its initial establishment.

Between the 2019–2020 budget and 2023, the Welsh Government had committed £1.939 million to the project, including funding for digitising artworks.

In December 2021, the Welsh Government's draft budget mentioned funding to be allocated to the development of the gallery, as well as other proposed museums such as a Football Museum for Wales and a Museum for North Wales. The inclusion in the draft budget follows Welsh Labour's programme for government and the 2021 Welsh Labour–Plaid Cymru agreement.

In summer 2019, Neath Port Talbot County Borough Council considered exploring whether the gallery can be somewhere based in Neath Port Talbot. No site in Neath Port Talbot was later shortlisted. In July 2022, a request for candidate sites for the main site was requested, closing by the end of August 2022. In September 2022, fourteen expressions of interest for sites to become the anchor site were received, with five later shortlisted. In February 2023, the Welsh third sector was also invited to submit expressions of interest.

In March 2023, the Arts Council of Wales, advertised for a "project director", as well as an "independent chair". By June 2023, the project appointed three individuals to make progress on the proposal.

In January 2024. Deputy Minister for Arts, Sport and Tourism, Dawn Bowden MS, stated while the government still hopes to progress the project, the government budget for the following year has been reduced. Bowden said the government may have to revise and revisit the proposals, saying the initial plans to announce a decision in March 2024 could be delayed. Bowden also stated that due to the "massive" amounts of funding needed to develop a main anchor site for the gallery, that part of the proposals may need to be reconsidered.

In May 2024, the Welsh Labour–Plaid Cymru agreement was ended early by Plaid Cymru.

In July 2024, Cabinet Secretary for Culture and Social Justice, Lesley Griffiths, announced the concept of a main site would be scrapped, as well as plans for a North Wales museum. The national contemporary gallery project's long-term vision would also be deprioritised by the current government. The scrapping of the main site and delaying the gallery project was to raise funds and support to Wales' existing museums and collections. The £3.2 million raised was then re-allocated to support emergency repairs to National Museum Cardiff and National Library of Wales buildings.

== Description ==
The project is developed through a partnership of Amgueddfa Cymru – Museum Wales, the Arts Council of Wales, the Welsh Government and the National Library of Wales. The proposed art gallery is part of the 2021 Welsh Labour–Plaid Cymru agreement, and part of the 2021–2026 Welsh Government's programme.

The gallery is to provide access to both digital and physical artwork to communities across Wales. Its collection would comprise the existing national collections of contemporary art held by Amgueddfa Cymru – Museum Wales and the National Library of Wales. The collection would then be dispersed through a network of galleries across Wales, using an extensive loan programme. The proposal uses a "geographically dispersed model".

This national art collection is held in Cardiff under the care of Amgueddfa Cymru, and the collection comprises 46,000 works, including applied artworks (11,000), artworks on paper (32,000), oil paintings (<2,000), sculptures (>600) and some new media (<50) including film and video. Of these artworks 60% are classed as modern and contemporary, being from 1900 to the present, and are part of the gallery's digitisation project. Another contemporary art collection of 10,000 works is held at the National Library of Wales.

The proposed gallery aims to fill in the absence of a national modern and contemporary art gallery representing Wales among the countries of the United Kingdom, and comparable to the Republic of Ireland's Irish Museum of Modern Art and Scotland's Scottish National Gallery of Modern Art. It was claimed in 2018, that many of Wales' contemporary artists could only showcase their work at the annual National Eisteddfod of Wales.

=== Aims ===
Developers of the proposal aim for the gallery to "grow the audience for visual art", particularly younger and more diverse audiences not usually represented in Welsh gallery attendance, as well as to support young and emerging artists. The gallery aims to increase access to contemporary art across Wales, and ensure such access is free. For the community, the gallery hopes to make contemporary art a stronger part of community health and wellbeing, provide learning opportunities (particularly for the youth), align with other digitisation projects, and invest in existing infrastructure to improve capital facilities. As well as increasing investment in exhibitions and programmes of work, creating new opportunities for contemporary artists working/living in Wales, creating new jobs in the arts sector, and increasing the status and profile of contemporary art with potential for tourism locally and outside Wales.

=== Galleries ===
The gallery uses a "geographically dispersed model" consisting of a network of galleries across Wales, as well as a main "anchor" site.

The gallery is also supported by an online gallery, the development of the Celf ar y Cyd website, with 30,000 images of the national collection being on the website from 20 June 2023, many of which not being on public display before.

==== Member galleries ====
Map of the nine shortlisted existing sites.

The Welsh Government proposes the gallery be made of either 6–10 regional sites, and one anchor hub.

The nine existing member venues that have been shortlisted to form a network for the gallery are:

- Aberystwyth Arts Centre
- Glynn Vivian Art Gallery, Swansea
- Mostyn, Llandudno
- Newport Museum and Art Gallery
- Oriel Davies, Newtown
- Oriel Myrddin, Carmarthen
- Plas Glyn-y-Weddw, Pwllheli
- Ruthin Craft Centre
- Storiel, Bangor

Work is to be done on how to potentially join these existing venues into the network of galleries through a phased approach, and to conduct a more detailed assessment of each, to fully identify any costs or constraints of any venue before deciding on a final list.

In July 2023, Storiel announced they were now beginning preparation for the gallery. Gwynedd Council welcomed the news that two member galleries would be within Gwynedd.

Other existing national host galleries, that already display the collection, or plan to, are the National Museum Cardiff, and National Library of Wales in Aberystwyth. The two would continue to display parts of the collection following the establishment of the gallery. There are also proposals for the National Slate Museum, Llanberis, to be another host gallery.

==== Cancelled proposals for main site ====
Map of the five shortlisted main site contenders by early 2024, until the idea was abandoned.

A main "anchor gallery" was under consideration to be the most prominent face of the contemporary gallery. It would have not replaced the other existing venues which would have also formed part of the gallery. But potentially it would have become a "central hub" to complement the provision of the collection to the other possibly ten sites. Re-using existing structures and possibly regenerating a town centre was desired of any candidate site. The anchor site was hoped to be a "magnet" for visitors and contribute to the local visitor economy and the cultural/creative sectors. Before 2018, the Welsh Government were considering it being housed in a new building until they recommended an existing building to be used instead.

In July 2022, the Deputy Minister for Arts and Sport, Dawn Bowden MS, stated that a request for candidate sites for the main site was requested in the same month, with a deadline set for the end of August 2022.

In September 2022, fourteen expressions of interest for sites to become the anchor site were received. Five local authorities, Cardiff, Merthyr Tydfil, Newport, Swansea and Wrexham, were shortlisted for the further development of their proposals.

In February 2023, the Welsh third sector was also invited to submit expressions of interest for any site they would consider to match the criteria, with the submissions considered by the government by June 2023.

In April 2023, Merthyr Tydfil's proposed site was revealed to be Cyfarthfa Castle. While in May 2023, it was revealed that Wrexham's shortlisted proposed site was the former Grove Park School building, and received £25,000 to develop their shortlisted proposal further. While by August 2023, Swansea council's proposed site for their anchor site in Swansea, comprised a re-developed Swansea Civic Centre and a newly built "art-box".

In January 2024, Deputy Minister for Arts, Sport and Tourism, Dawn Bowden MS, stated that due to high levels of funding needed for a main site, and the decreased funding in the Welsh government's budget, developing a main site may initially become more challenging than just an initial regional network of existing galleries. Bowden also stated the planned March 2024 announcement may be delayed.

In July 2024, Cabinet Secretary for Culture and Social Justice, Lesley Griffiths, announced the concept of a main site would be scrapped, as part of an initiative to raise £3.2 million to be re-allocated to support emergency repairs to National Museum Cardiff and National Library of Wales buildings.
