= National Curriculum for England =

Educational curriculum used in England since 1988

The National Curriculum for England is the statutory standard of school subjects, lesson content, and attainment levels for primary and secondary schools in England. It is compulsory for local authority-maintained schools, but also often followed by independent schools and state-funded academies. It was first introduced by the Education Reform Act 1988 as simply The National Curriculum and applied to both England and Wales. However, education later became a devolved matter for the Welsh government.

The National Curriculum for England has been updated multiple times since its introduction. As of 2024, the current version in use dates from 2014.

== Aims ==
The Education Act 2002 sets out the statutory duty for schools to offer a school curriculum that is balanced and broad-based, that "promotes the spiritual, moral, cultural, mental and physical development of pupils at the school and of society" and that prepares pupils for the "opportunities, responsibilities and experiences of later life". The National Curriculum is designed to be one part of such a school curriculum.

The statutory documentation for the National Curriculum presents two main aims:

3.1
The national curriculum provides pupils with an introduction to the essential knowledge they require to be educated citizens. It introduces pupils to the best that has been thought and said, and helps engender an appreciation of human creativity and achievements.

3.2
The national curriculum is just one of the many elements in the education of every child. There is time and space in the school day and in each week, term and year to range beyond the national curriculum specifications. The national curriculum provides an outline of core knowledge around which teachers can develop exciting and stimulating lessons to promote the development of pupils’ knowledge, understanding and skills as part of the wider school curriculum.

== Structure ==
The National Curriculum is set out for all year groups for pupils aged between 5 and 16. Year groups are divided into four Key Stages, each of which has a different compulsory list of taught subjects. These subjects are indicated in the following table:

Subject	Key Stage 1 (age 5–7)	Key Stage 2 (age 7–11)	Key Stage 3 (age 11–14)	Key Stage 4 (age 14–16)
English				
Mathematics				
Science				
Art & Design				
Citizenship				
Computing				
Design & Technology				
Languages (Note: Languages is entitled "Foreign Languages" in Key Stage 2, and "Modern Foreign Languages" in Key Stage 3.)				
Geography				
History				
Music				
Physical Education				

The Secretary of State for Education is required to set out a Programme of Study for each statutory curriculum subject which outlines the "matters, skills and processes" which must be taught at the relevant Key Stages. The most recently published National Curriculum was introduced into schools in September 2014.

=== Other entitlements ===
Children in all Key Stages must additionally be provided with a curriculum of Religious Education, and for pupils in Key Stages 3 and 4 a curriculum of Sex and Relationships Education must also be provided.

In addition to the compulsory subjects, students at Key Stage 4 have a statutory entitlement to study one modern language and at least one subject from:

- the arts (comprising art and design, music, photography, dance, drama and media arts)
- design and technology (comprising design and technology, electronics, engineering, food preparation and nutrition)
- humanities (comprising geography and history), business and enterprise (comprising business studies and economics)

== History ==
=== Callaghan's Great Debate ===
In a 1976 speech at Ruskin College, Prime Minister James Callaghan launched what became known as the "Great Debate". The speech has been called "revolutionary" in the context of its time, and said to have "lit a flare that has illuminated education reform ever since". The speech was intended to stimulate wide debate on the purpose of education in the UK:

These are proper subjects for discussion and debate. And it should be a rational debate based on the facts... It is not my intention to become enmeshed in such problems as whether there should be a basic curriculum with universal standards - although I am inclined to think there should be... The goals of our education, from nursery school through to adult education, are clear enough. They are to equip children to the best of their ability for a lively, constructive, place in society, and also to fit them to do a job of work. Not one or the other but both... Both of the basic purposes of education require the same essential tools. These are basic literacy, basic numeracy, the understanding of how to live and work together, respect for others, respect for the individual. This means requiring certain basic knowledge, and skills and reasoning ability. It means developing lively inquiring minds and an appetite for further knowledge that will last a lifetime. It means mitigating as far as possible the disadvantages that may be suffered through poor home conditions or physical or mental handicap. Are we aiming in the right direction in these matters?

=== 1988 Education Reform Act ===
The first statutory National Curriculum was introduced by the Education Reform Act 1988 by Kenneth Baker. The Programmes of Study were drafted and published in 1988 and 1989, with the first teaching of some elements of the new curriculum beginning in September 1989. Moreover, the curriculum was viewed as an opportunity to promote cultural and moral values.

=== 1994–1995 Shephard reforms ===
Under Gillian Shephard's tenure as Education Secretary, a review of the National Curriculum was launched in 1994, led by Ron Dearing. Its objective was to find ways to 'slim down' the over-detailed curriculum. The final report set out the need to reduce the volume of statutory content, particularly at lower key stages, as well as recommending changes to methods of assessment. Consequently, an updated National Curriculum was published in 1995 which saw a considerable reduction in the content of the curriculum and a simplification in line with Dearing's recommendations.

=== 1997–1999 Blunkett reforms ===
When a new Labour government took office in 1997, its focus on English and Mathematics led to a decision to disapply the statutory Programmes of Study for the foundation subjects from September 1998, to allow schools to spend more time teaching literacy and numeracy. The Secretary of State, David Blunkett, later announced another overhaul of the National Curriculum, particularly at primary level, to reduce the content in foundation subjects allowing more time to be spent on the core subjects of English, Mathematics and Science. A new National Curriculum was published in 1999, for first teaching in September 2000.

=== 2007–2008 Balls reforms ===
Further changes were announced by Ed Balls in 2007 for the statutory curriculum for Key Stages 3 and 4, which again focused on removing some content from the documentation, while also adding some additional element, with the intended aim of additional flexibility for schools. These changes were introduced in September 2008, and were swiftly followed by proposed changes to the primary curriculum, based on a review to be led by Jim Rose. The review proposed replacing the 10 statutory subjects in Key Stages 1 and 2 with 6 broader 'areas of learning', such as "understanding English, communication and languages" and "human, social and environmental understanding". However, following the change of government in 2010, the plans for this change — proposed to begin in September 2011 — were abandoned, with schools advised to continue to follow the 2000 curriculum pending review.

=== 2012–2014 Gove reforms ===
Following his appointment as Education Secretary in 2010, Michael Gove commissioned an expert review panel to report on a framework for a new National Curriculum. The review was led by Tim Oates of Cambridge Assessment, and reported in December 2011. It suggested significant changes to the structure of the National Curriculum, including dividing Key Stage 2 into two shorter (two-year) phases.

In 2013, the government produced a draft National Curriculum, followed by a final version in September 2013, for first teaching in September 2014. Due to the short timescales for introduction, the curriculum was introduced only for certain subjects and year groups in 2014, with the core subjects in Years 2 and 6 (the final years of Key Stages 1 and 2) only becoming statutory in September 2015, to allow time for the introduction of new testing arrangements at the end of the Key Stages. Similarly, core subjects at Key Stage 4 were introduced on a year-by-year basis starting in September 2015 for English and Mathematics, and September 2016 for Science.

== See also ==
- Education in England
- Education in the United Kingdom

=== Other UK curriculums ===
- Northern Ireland Curriculum - Northern Ireland
- Curriculum for excellence - Scotland
- National Curriculum for Wales (2008 to 2026) - Wales (old)
- Curriculum for Wales (2022 to present) - Wales (new)

=== External links ===
- Official website
- UK Parliament Briefing Note OGL licence
- Secondary Curriculum
- Primary Curriculum
