= Grove Park School, Wrexham =

Disused school building in Wrexham, Wales

Grove Park School
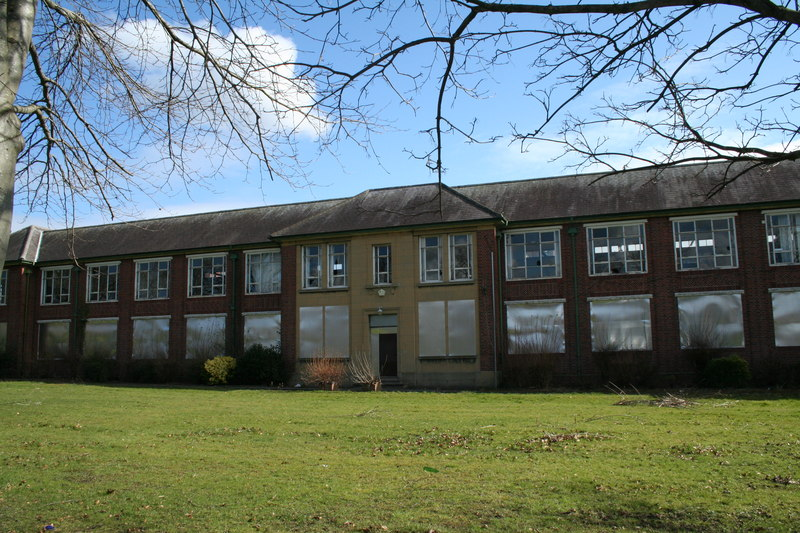
- Disused buildings of the Chester Road site, first used as a girls grammar school.
- Interactive map of the Grove Park School area
- Former names: Grove Park County School for Girls (1939–1972); Park Avenue Comprehensive (1972); Bromfield High School (~1970s–1983); Groves High School (1983–2003); Penymaes (2003–2005)

General information
- Type: School (1939–2003); Gallery (proposed)
- Architectural style: 1930s Neo-classical and some Art Deco
- Location: Chester Road/Powell Road, Acton, Wrexham, Wales
- Coordinates: 53.050714°N 2.990848°W
- Construction started: 1936
- Completed: 1939
- Renovated: 1950s–1960s
- Closed: 2003

Design and construction
- Architect: Gilbert D Wiles

Listed Building – Grade II
- Official name: Former Grove Park School
- Designated: 29 November 2016
- Reference no.: 87719

The Grove Park School (or simply the Groves School) is a former school building in Wrexham, North Wales, which was home to a school between 1939 and 2003. The secondary school closed in 2003, although pupils of the two successor schools continued to use the site until 2005 as their schools underwent re-development. The Groves site was proposed for demolition by Wrexham council in 2016 for two new schools, but was prevented by the Welsh Government, who listed the building in 2016, following a campaign to preserve it. Various bids have been made to re-develop the site, including it becoming part of Coleg Cambria, being converted into a new primary school, a Welsh-medium secondary school, a medical training facility, or part of a national gallery. Coleg Cambria announced they were discussing the site again in 2026.

There were initially two schools using the local name Grove Park, a boys and a girls school, based on Grove Park Road and Chester Road respectively. They were both converted into comprehensive schools, with the former boys school merging to the main existing girls school site. The combined secondary school later became known as the Bromfield High School and later Groves High School. The old boys school buildings became part of Coleg Cambria's Yale campus.

== History ==
=== Grove Park schools ===
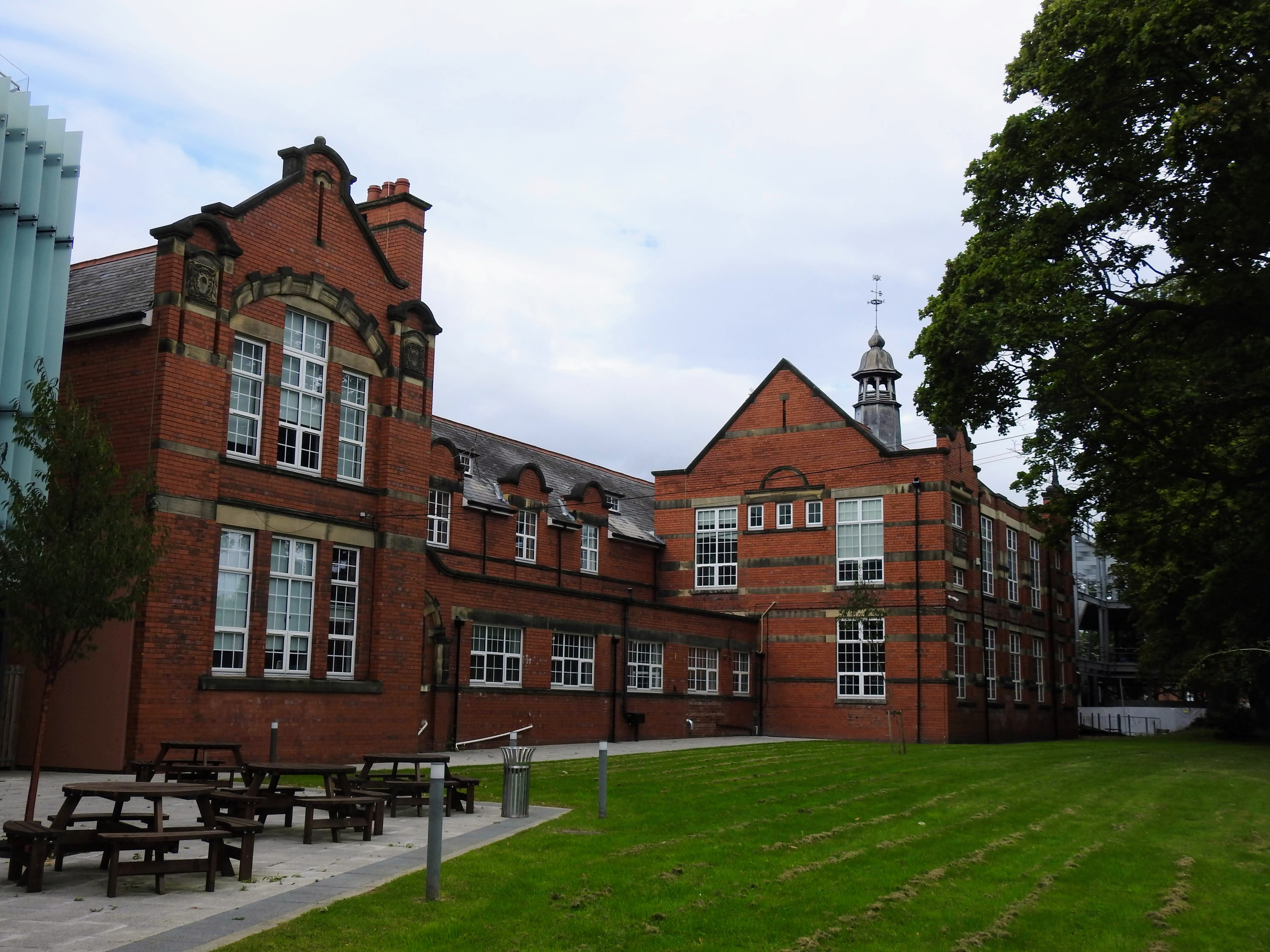
1902 Boys School buildings facing Chester Road, near the Grove Park Road site which would've been behind these buildings. Now part of Coleg Cambria.

A school under the name Grove Park was founded in 1895, replacing a previous school known as The Groves Academy, and the new school was a grammar school for boys. It was initially housed in the Groves Academy (or now old Grove Park School) buildings near Grove Park Road, until they were sold to Wrexham Borough Council in return for a £11,500 (equivalent to £1,222,104 in 2025) fund which led to the construction of new red brick buildings closer to Chester Road, opening in 1902. While it was mainly a school for boys, some girls were educated at the school in small numbers, until they later moved to a purpose-built girls school site.

=== Construction of main building ===
In 1936, a separate building began construction on Chester Road/Powell Road, to the designs of Gilbert D Wiles. In 1939, a girls grammar school was founded also under the name Grove Park and moved into the now-existing building on Chester Road/Powell Road (the only one that now stands) and had 580 female pupils at the end of the World War II. This girl's building was almost opposite the 1902 boys school buildings. It was renamed a grammar school in the 1940s.

Between the late 1950s and early 1960s, the girls school had large extensions built onto it, providing a new gymnasium, science block and extra classrooms. The science block was constructed in anticipation of the introduction of mixed-sex comprehensive education in the area by 1972.

=== School re-organisation ===
By the 1960s, comprehensive schools were emerging in Denbighshire, leading to the eventual amalgamation and dissolution of single-sex schools, despite a local campaign to maintain them. The Grove Park County School for Boys and the Grove Park County School for Girls were amalgamated with each other, and two comprehensive schools were then formed on the two sites in 1972. The boys school on Grove Park Road became the Grove Park School, while the girls school on Chester Road became Park Avenue Comprehensive, although later changed to Bromfield High School. Bromfield was situated in the buildings of the former girls school and was to serve the areas around Chester Road, Maesydre, and Queens Park (now Caia Park). School children from the Groves also utilised the nearby Nine Acres field.

In 1983, the Grove Park School situated on the former red brick boys school site merged with Bromfield High School becoming the Groves High School, with pupils from the Grove Park Road/Chester Road site moving to the Chester Road site. The red brick buildings facing Chester Road and near Grove Park Road, were then left vacant for a few years until it became the NEWI (now Wrexham University; formerly Glyndŵr) School of Art. Until the early 1990s when it was transferred to Yale College, with the entire 1972 Grove Park School site becoming part of the college, which itself is now part of Coleg Cambria.

=== Closure and proposed demolition ===
The former high school closed down in July 2003, amid a reorganisation of Wrexham's secondary school education. Pupils of the school were split into two "super" high schools, Ysgol Clywedog (previously Bryn Offa) and Rhosnesni High School (previously St Davids). Although the Groves site continued to be used until 2005 for pupils of the two new schools during their re-development, but under the name "Penymaes". It was also planned, prior in 2002, for the Groves to be purchased by nearby Yale College, with Yale needing to raise "major investment" for it. However by the end of 2002, Yale admitted it could not afford to purchase the Groves School building. The council looked into selling other council property as a result.

In 2012, the first arguments for demolishing the deteriorating building were raised, with the building's newer science tower being demolished later in the same year.

In 2014, Coleg Cambria (replacing Yale) revealed plans to develop the site into part of its Wrexham central campus. In 2015, the original 1902 buildings, part of Coleg Cambria, were refurbished.

In 2016, it was announced to be demolished, and replaced with up to two new schools on the site. 250 and later 1,000 people signed a petition urging the site be retained. Coleg Cambria considered the site to become part of its campus, however the plans did not fall through. The council rejected requests to re-evaluate the decision, and 55 local campaigners gathered outside the building to oppose its demolition. Threats were also made to the council's leader over the announcement. The site has cost £100,000 in upkeep to maintain since its closure in 2003, and an additional £900,000 between 2006 and 2016.

=== Listed status and proposals ===
In August 2016, the Welsh Government prevented its demolition by making it a listed building with Cadw. Its listing by the government has led Wrexham council to argue the Welsh Government should pay for the site. In November 2016, the listed status was overturned following a High Court-issued judicial review raised by Wrexham council. It asked Welsh economy and infrastructure secretary, Ken Skates to review his decision for listing. However, Mark Drakeford, finance and local government secretary, backed the listing, re-instating it with immediate effect. Skates backed his original decision to list the building, stating it was the "right one", but accepted the original decision lacked detail. The site is subject to a covenant meaning it can only be redeveloped for educational use, with Wrexham council initially wanting to build a new school on the site by demolishing the building prior to its listed status. In 2017, the council abandoned its bid to demolish the site.

In 2018, Wrexham council looked into re-using the building for education, such as a primary school for 480 pupils. However, the estimated cost of £11.5 million to refurbish the building was stated to be too expensive to pursue. The council then considered using the land adjacent to the building to construct a new school building costing £6.7 million.

In 2020, following plans to build a new school on the nearby Nine Acre field, campaigners opposing a school on that site, urged Wrexham Council to construct the new school on the Groves site instead. In 2021, the site was considered to become a medical training facility, however Wales' travel restrictions at the time were stated to have hampered the proposal. In 2022, a local councillor argued the site should be used to create Wrexham's second Welsh-medium high school.

In May 2023, the site was shortlisted, alongside five others, as a potential contender of the main site of the National Contemporary Art Gallery for Wales, with Wrexham Council receiving £25,000 to develop its proposal. A proposed main site for the gallery was scrapped in July 2024.

In 2024, local heritage campaigners accused the council of allowing the building to fall into disrepair. On 10 August 2025, Wrexham Council stated that the headline summary costs for the site since its closure in 2003 was £821,255, with the council describing the situation concerning the former school as "frustrating" and they "worked tirelessly" searching for a solution to it. The cost is attributed to insurance and security to protect the site from issues like vandalism and adverse weather. On 13 August 2025, local Plaid Cymru councillors called for the site to be turned into a community hospital. The local health board, Betsi Cadwaladr University Health Board, stated they have "no plans" to progress with the proposal.

In April 2026, the council and Coleg Cambria announced an agreement for the college to use the site for an educational purpose, as required by the site's legal covenant. The college previously was interested in the site in 2014.

== Description ==
The building is largely in the neoclassical styles, although a 1930s interpretation, with some art deco elements. It is made of brushed brick, with herringbone panels and geometric arrangements. The building main western-facing entrance range is of a wide 15-bay symmetrical façade, with advanced hipped end bays, while its central entrance is advanced with stone or artificial stone. There is a dedication stone located next to the entrance doors, which was laid by William Jones JP, who was chairman of the Governors, and laid the stone in June 1938. The building has three wings projecting backwards, a central hall wing, and from the outside it also has two mirrored classroom wings. There are quadrangles and cloistered walkways filling the spaces between the wings.

Inside the building, there is a double sweep stair, located in the main entrance hall which has terrazzo treads and a baluster of cast iron. Small stairs of a similar design are present in the rears of each side wing. The classroom layouts are largely still intact, containing some of its original detailing such as dado panelling, parquet flooring and doors.

== Notable alumni ==
- Martyn Jones – British politician
- Frederick Rosier – Royal Air Force Air Chief Marshal (1915–1998)
- John Eyton-Jones – Welsh physician and footballer
- Robert Armstrong-Jones – Welsh physician
