= Education of the British royal family =

The education of the British royal family has changed over time, reflecting shifting ideas about education of the aristocracy and the role of the monarchy in the United Kingdom. Traditionally, heirs to the throne and other royal children were educated privately by tutors. In the Tudor era, ideas of Renaissance humanism—emphasising the liberal arts and sciences and the classics—influenced royal education. Elizabeth I, for example, was multi-lingual and wrote a number of translations.

Later, in the Georgian and Victorian eras, royal education followed the French model, with governors overseeing the child's discipline and moral development, and preceptors conducting academic instruction. In the modern era, members of the House of Windsor have had varying degrees of education. The first heir to the British throne (and later monarch) to receive a university degree was Charles III. Since the later 20th century, members of the royal family have been educated in public schools, universities and military institutes.

== Tudor and Elizabethan eras ==
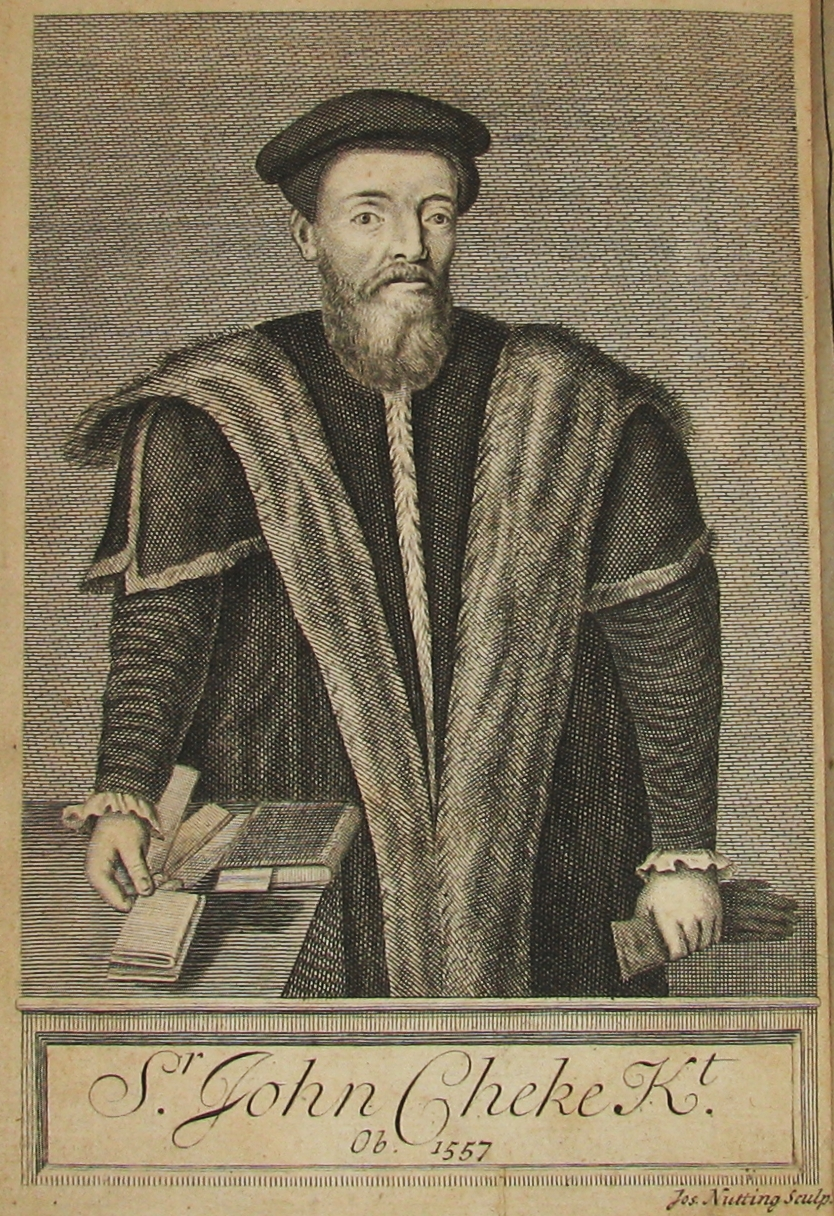
The scholar John Cheke, depicted here in an engraving by Joseph Nutting, was tutor to Edward VI.

The scholar Erasmus and his fellow humanists, who promoted the liberal arts and sciences over military training for princes, had an influence on the curriculum studied by Henry VIII's children, and later the Stuart princes.

Henry VIII established an elite palace school for his son Prince Edward, selecting fourteen sons of prominent aristocrats to be educated alongside him. Biographer Alison Weir writes: "The men who were given responsibility for the Prince's education were among the most brilliant scholars of their day". Edward was taught by Dr. Richard Cox, a clergyman who later become provost of Eton College and bishop of Ely, as well as John Cheke, the first Regius Professor of Greek at Cambridge University. Elizabeth I was well-educated, receiving lessons alongside her brother Edward and later being tutored by William Grindal and Roger Ascham. Elizabeth was proficient in French, Italian and Latin, using these foreign-language skills to interact with foreign diplomats and to create a "sizeable body of translations" over the course of her life. Battista Castiglione served as Elizabeth's formal tutor in Italian.

Historian Aysha Pollnitz writes: "While Erasmus never managed to deter English or Scottish royal boys from military training, he did succeed in tipping the scales in letters' favour: between 1534 in England, 1566 in Scotland and the outbreak of the Bishops' Wars in 1639, princes male and female spent more time learning to wield pens than swords or guns". During this period, "British princes were notably bookish" in comparison to the Spanish Habsburgs (who emphasized "bureaucratic skills, handling weapons, and orthodox piety"). While royal females in early modern Britain were not raised in preparation to rule and received liberal educations that were constrained in comparison to their male relatives, Mary I, Elizabeth I, Lady Jane Grey, Mary, Queen of Scots, and Elizabeth Stuart, Queen of Bohemia all wrote letters generally praised by scholars. Lady Jane Grey was tutored by clergyman John Aylmer, her family's chaplain, and "distinguished herself in her studies beyond her parents' wishes, since they were more interested in preparing her for the stylish life of court" than for serious academic learning.

== Stuart era ==
The education of Charles I, King of England, Scotland and Ireland, was overseen by Sir Thomas Murray, who taught Charles "the usual subjects: the Classics, French, Italian, arithmetic and theology" and supervised other tutors to the future king—Charles Guerolt, who taught fencing; John Beauchesne (who taught fine penmanship), and John Norton (who oversaw the library). Charles's education "has been praised and blamed for forming his personality and political conduct" in the lead-up to the English Civil War. Samuel Rawson Gardiner and Conrad Russell believed that Charles's education had not taught him empathy or the ability "to identify both sides of a political or religious question, a skill that could have taught him to appreciate both his opponents' perspectives or at least to anticipate their arguments and negotiate with them effectively".

In 1635, Brian Duppa—dean of Christ Church and a chaplain to Charles I—was appointed tutor to the future Charles II. Duppa was well-suited to the position and had a close relationship with Charles for the rest of his life. Other tutors were brought in as well - including Peter Massonnet, who taught the prince Latin, Spanish, Italian, and most importantly French; Henry Gregory, who taught the prince to write; and Guilaume le Pierrie, a Frenchman hired when Charles was six years old to teach him dancing. In 1638, William Cavendish, Earl of Newcastle was placed in overall charge of the prince (then seven years old) as his governor. In 1647, Hobbes took up a position as mathematical instructor to the young Charles, Prince of Wales, who had come to Paris from Jersey around July. This engagement lasted until 1648 when Charles went to Holland.

== Georgian, Victorian, and Edwardian eras ==
In the 18th century, George III had his two eldest sons - the future George IV and Frederick - educated in emulation of French royal custom. A governor and sub-governor were appointed for the child's discipline and morals, and the preceptor and sub-preceptor for lessons concerning academic subjects.

The role and public perceptions of the monarchy have changed over time, raising "interesting questions about the ideal upbringing and preparation of future constitutional monarchs, including their formal education". Walter Bagehot, in his book The British Constitution, concluded that a prince's education "can be but a poor education and that a royal family will generally have less ability than other families".

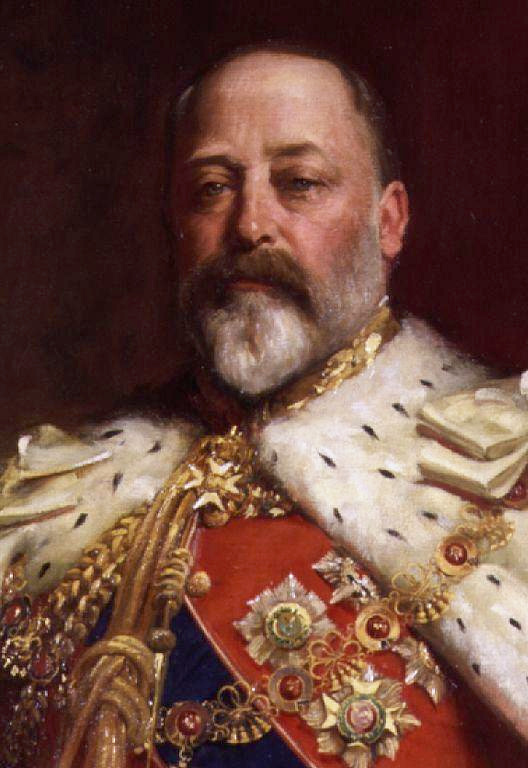
Edward VII was described as having a "lack of power to grasp almost anything put before him" by one of his tutors.

Historians have "assessed how well royal education has prepared monarchs for their political and ceremonial role" in British society. Peter Gordon and Dennis Lawton, writing in 1999, rated the education of Queen Victoria as good, "yet in contrast no subsequent monarch (or current heir) has been anywhere near adequately educated". Ross McKibbin argues that the educations of George V, Edward VIII, and George VI were "aimless" and "narrow," leaving them with the equivalent to the educations of "landed gentry with military connections".

Although phrenology was largely discredited by the mid-19th century, Queen Victoria and Prince Albert had their children evaluated by a phrenologist. He described her eldest son Edward VII as having a skull that was "feeble and abnormal". Throughout her life, Victoria believed Edward to have a "small, empty brain".

Edward briefly attended the universities at Edinburgh, Oxford, and Cambridge, but did not graduate from any of them. Dennis Judd, professor of British history at London Metropolitan University has opined that "there is no evidence" Edward's brief time at these universities "did much good" and William Ewart Gladstone said of the king that he "knew everything except what is in books". John Neale Dalton, one of Edward's tutors, said that the future king had a "weakness of brain, this feebleness and lack of power to grasp almost anything put before him"; another tutor, J. K. Stephen, determined there was no use for Edward to attend university at all since he was unable to understand the words he was reading. As a "tribute to his birth, rather than his intellect" he was granted an honorary LL.D. Even as a child, however, Edward VII's governess had noted he would learn more from people than books, and he had great social gifts; his popularity is believed to have helped the United Kingdom create alliances in Europe in the early 20th century.

Victoria's youngest son, Prince Leopold, Duke of Albany, enrolled at Christ Church, Oxford, in November 1872. He had been diagnosed about 1859 with haemophilia, having shown symptoms from a young age. The family tried to take measures through Leopold's youth to protect his health; the disease was not well understood at the time. He studied science, art and the modern languages at Oxford but did not receive a university degree; he was granted an honorary doctorate from Oxford University in 1876. He also was believed to have epilepsy, and died young in 1884.

George VI attended the Royal Naval College, Osborne, which was then a junior officer training facility for students of secondary-school age; he finished at the bottom of his class. George studied for one year at the University of Cambridge, but did not complete an undergraduate degree.

== Modern era ==
=== Elizabeth II's generation ===
Elizabeth II, and her sister Margaret were the last members of the royal family to be educated at home by tutors in the traditional manner. Elizabeth and Margaret were home-schooled by their governess Marion Crawford. Private tutors of Elizabeth included the provost of Eton College, Henry Marten, who instructed her in constitutional history. Elizabeth spoke French fluently, learning from a succession of governesses who were native speakers. During World War II, the then Princess Elizabeth joined the Auxiliary Territorial Service and participated in a Vehicle Maintenance Course at Aldershot; the length of the course is variously reported as three weeks or six weeks.

Historian David Starkey described Elizabeth II in his 2007 television documentary series Monarchy as poorly learned, comparing her to a "housewife" in terms of cultural refinement and intellectual curiosity. According to The Telegraph, his comments prompted rebuttals from several sources. Royal biographer Penny Junor said: "The Queen is certainly cultured even if not that moved by the arts. The Prince of Wales has a great sense of history and a lot of that comes from his mother". Marco Houston, editor of Royalty Monthly, said Elizabeth "may not have had the best formal education, but she has had the best education at the university of life".

Prince Richard, Duke of Gloucester, Elizabeth's cousin, studied architecture at Magdalene College, Cambridge. Richard graduated in 1966 after completing three years of a five-year architectural course; after a practical year at an office in the Ministry of Public Building and Works, Richard returned to Cambridge and in June 1969 passed both parts of a diploma in architecture. Richard went on to work as an architect.

=== Elizabeth and Philip's children and their spouses ===
After being tutored as a child, Prince Charles briefly attended Hill House School before entering Cheam School at age eight. Charles spent five years at Cheam, from ages eight to thirteen. Charles was then sent—over the objections of Queen Elizabeth the Queen Mother—to Gordonstoun, a Scottish public school, becoming the first heir to the throne to sit for public examinations when he took his O-levels at age sixteen, passing six. Charles strongly disliked Gordonstoun, describing the school as "Colditz in kilts" and his time there as a "disastrous" one. In 1966 he also spent two terms at Geelong Grammar's Timbertop campus in Victoria, Australia. Prince Charles entered Trinity College, Cambridge in 1967, where he read history, archaeology and anthropology and graduated with a 2:2 degree in 1970. This was the first time in history that a British monarch or heir to the throne had completed a university degree.

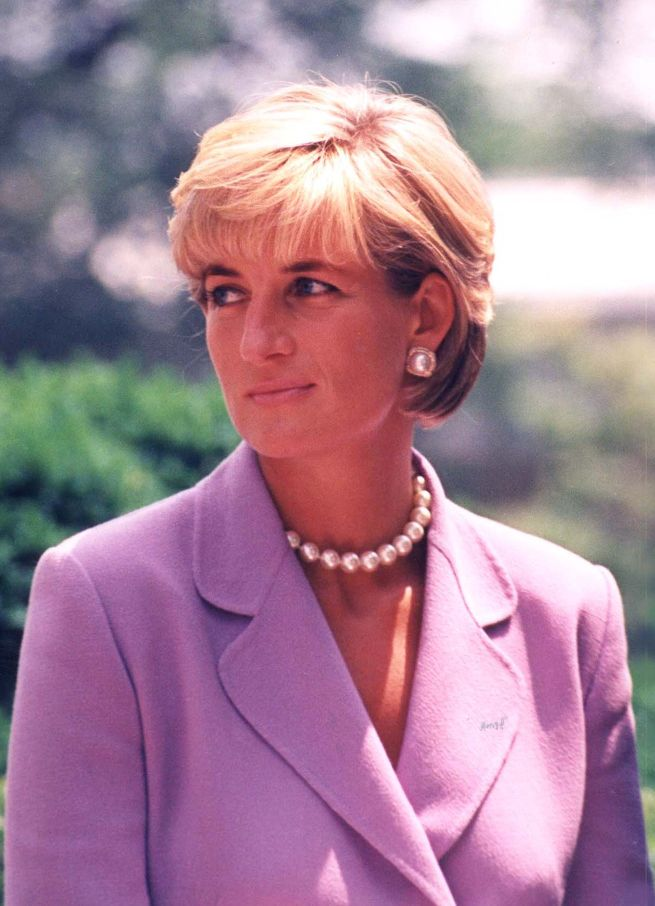
Diana, Princess of Wales, failed her O-level exams before dropping out of finishing school.

Novelist Monica Ali described Charles's first wife, Diana, Princess of Wales, as being able to engage with the public on issues such as mental health in spite of her being "uneducated and intellectually insecure". Princess Michael of Kent has said that Diana struggled with praise on account of her difficult upbringing and because she "did not have much education". According to tapes released in 2004, Diana had said that her immediate family members told her she was "the thick one". Diana failed her O-level examinations (equivalent of a high school diploma in the United States) and later dropped out of finishing school. Journalist John Lanchester said that, while failure on Diana's scale would normally mean one was "astoundingly stupid", Diana had intentionally avoided academic pursuits as part of a master plan not to "put a royal suitor off".

Anne, Princess Royal was tutored at home as a child by her governess Catherine Peebles, who had also taught Charles. At the age of 13, Anne was sent to Benenden School, a boarding school. In 1968 she left with O-Levels and two A-Levels.

Andrew Mountbatten-Windsor attended Gordonstoun. He had no formal education beyond that, but completed a Royal Navy commissioning course at Britannia Royal Naval College and other courses during a military career. Andrew's election to the Royal Society in 2013 caused discontent amongst the scientific community in the UK due to his lack of scientific background. In an op-ed in The Sunday Times, Humboldt Prize recipient David Colquhoun opined, in references to Andrew's qualifications, that "if I wanted a tip for the winner of the 14.30 at Newmarket, I'd ask a royal. For most other questions, I wouldn't".

Prince Edward, Duke of Edinburgh, born in 1964, also went to private schools. In 1982, he left Gordonstoun with several A-levels. He enrolled for two terms at the Wanganui Collegiate School in Wanganui, New Zealand. There he also served as a house tutor and oversaw drama classes. In 1986, he received a Bachelor of Arts degree from the University of Cambridge.

=== Charles and Diana's children ===
William, Prince of Wales, Charles's elder son and next in line to the throne, entered Eton College in 1995, becoming the first senior member of the royal family to attend Eton. William obtained A-levels in geography, biology and history of art, as well as 12 GCSEs. Following a gap year, William enrolled at University of St Andrews in Fife, Scotland, where he graduated in 2005 with a 2:1 degree in geography.

To prepare for eventually inheriting and taking over management of the Duchy of Cornwall estate (a "£760 million (about $1.25 billion) entity established in 1337 to provide a private income for use by the reigning monarch's eldest son") after his father's eventual accession as king, William enrolled in 2014 in a 10-week, vocational agriculture-management course through the Cambridge Programme for Sustainability Leadership (CPSL), whose patron is the Prince of Wales. William's admission to the program prompted some criticism from commentators who believed William had an unfair advantage, but criticism receded after observers noted that the program was a short, non-degree-granting executive education-type course that was customarily open to anyone willing to pay for it, without regard to past grades or academic records.

William's younger brother, Prince Harry, Duke of Sussex, also attended Eton; Harry does not have a university degree but completed ten months of officer commissioning training at the Royal Military Academy Sandhurst.

In 2005 Sarah Forsyth, one of Harry's former teachers at Eton, said that Harry was a "weak student" and alleged that fellow staff had conspired to help him cheat in examinations. Her statement was related to a wrongful dismissal suit Forsyth filed alleging she had been fired for refusing to participate in the alleged cheating scheme. Both Eton and Harry denied the claims. While a tribunal made no ruling on the cheating claim, it "accepted the prince had received help in preparing his A-level 'expressive' project, which he needed to pass to secure his place at Sandhurst". Eton paid £45,000 in damages to Forsyth over her dismissal.

=== Andrew's children ===
Andrew's daughters, Beatrice and Eugenie, were noted in 2008 as having earned the best grades so far in the royal family in their A-levels, better than their father and uncle, and than their older cousins William and Harry. Eugenie ranked first with her two As and a B in art, English literature, and history of art from Marlborough College. Beatrice, who is dyslexic, studied at Goldsmiths, University of London, graduating in 2011 with a 2:1 bachelor's degree in history and the history of ideas. Eugenie studied at Newcastle University, graduating in 2012 with a 2:1 bachelor's degree in English and history of art.

== See also ==
- History of education in England
- Education in the United Kingdom

== Bibliography ==
- Clarke, M.J. (1978). "The Education of Royalty in the Eighteenth Century: George IV and William IV". British Journal of Educational Studies. 26 (1): 73–87. doi:10.2307/3120477. JSTOR 3120477.
- Gordon, Peter; Lawton, Denis (2003). Royal Education: Past, Present, and Future. Psychology Press. ISBN 978-0-7146-8386-7.
- Hulse, Clark (2003). Elizabeth I: Ruler and Legend. University of Illinois Press. ISBN 978-0-252-07161-4.
- Keay, Anna (2008). The Magnificent Monarch: Charles II and the Ceremonies of Power. Bloomsbury Academic. ISBN 978-1-84725-225-8.
- Mueller, Janel; Scodel, Joshia, eds. (2009). Elizabeth I: Translations, 1544-1589. University of Chicago Press. ISBN 978-0-226-20133-7.
- Pollnitz, Aysha (2015). Princely Education in Early Modern Britain. Cambridge University Press. ISBN 978-1-107-03952-0.
- Weir, Alison (2008). Henry VIII: King and Court. Vintage. ISBN 978-0-09-953242-2.
- Zeepvat, Charlotte (1998). Prince Leopold: The Untold Story of Queen Victoria's Youngest Son. Sutton. ISBN 978-0-7509-1308-9.
