= North–South Wales railway =

Proposed railway line in Wales

A North–South Wales railway, also known as Traws Link Cymru (lit. 'Trans Link Wales') is a proposed rail service line that would link North and South Wales via a western rail line from Swansea to Bangor. Most proposals for such a route would include re-opening the Carmarthen–Aberystwyth and the Bangor–Afon Wen line.

== Campaign ==
The campaign group, Traws Link Cymru was founded in 2013 and its aim is to reopen the Aberystwyth–Carmarthen and Afon Wen–Bangor rail lines which were closed as part of the Beeching cuts in the 1960s. Since those cuts, rail travel between Carmarthen and Bangor takes a six-hour journey that must go outside Wales and through Hereford, Shrewsbury and Chester (although it Is possible to travel the route by bus)

In March 2020, the campaign group gained media attention following campaigning for several years to re-open the line south from Aberystwyth to Carmarthen and a £300,000 feasibility study was carried out. Spokesman Elfed Wyn Jones stated, "Reopening the railway would benefit villages and towns along the track and by reinstating the line between Afon-wen and Bangor, as well as reopening the line between Aberystwyth and Carmarthen, would create a rail network within Wales, between the North and the South, rather than travelling for extra hours and distance through England to complete the journey."

An agreement between Plaid Cymru and the Labour Welsh Government was made which included transport in Wales, and would “ask Transport for Wales and other partners to explore how transport links between the north and south of Wales can be developed”. The agreement would also explore “how to protect potential travel corridors along the western coast of Wales from Swansea to Bangor”.

In June 2021, Transport for Wales stated there were no plans to open a north-south route. A route that reinstated the former lines through mid-Wales would most likely be slower than the existing route through England, and a completely new route and alignment through mid-Wales would be too complex to design and build, likely making costs prohibitive.

=== Carmarthen–Aberyswyth ===
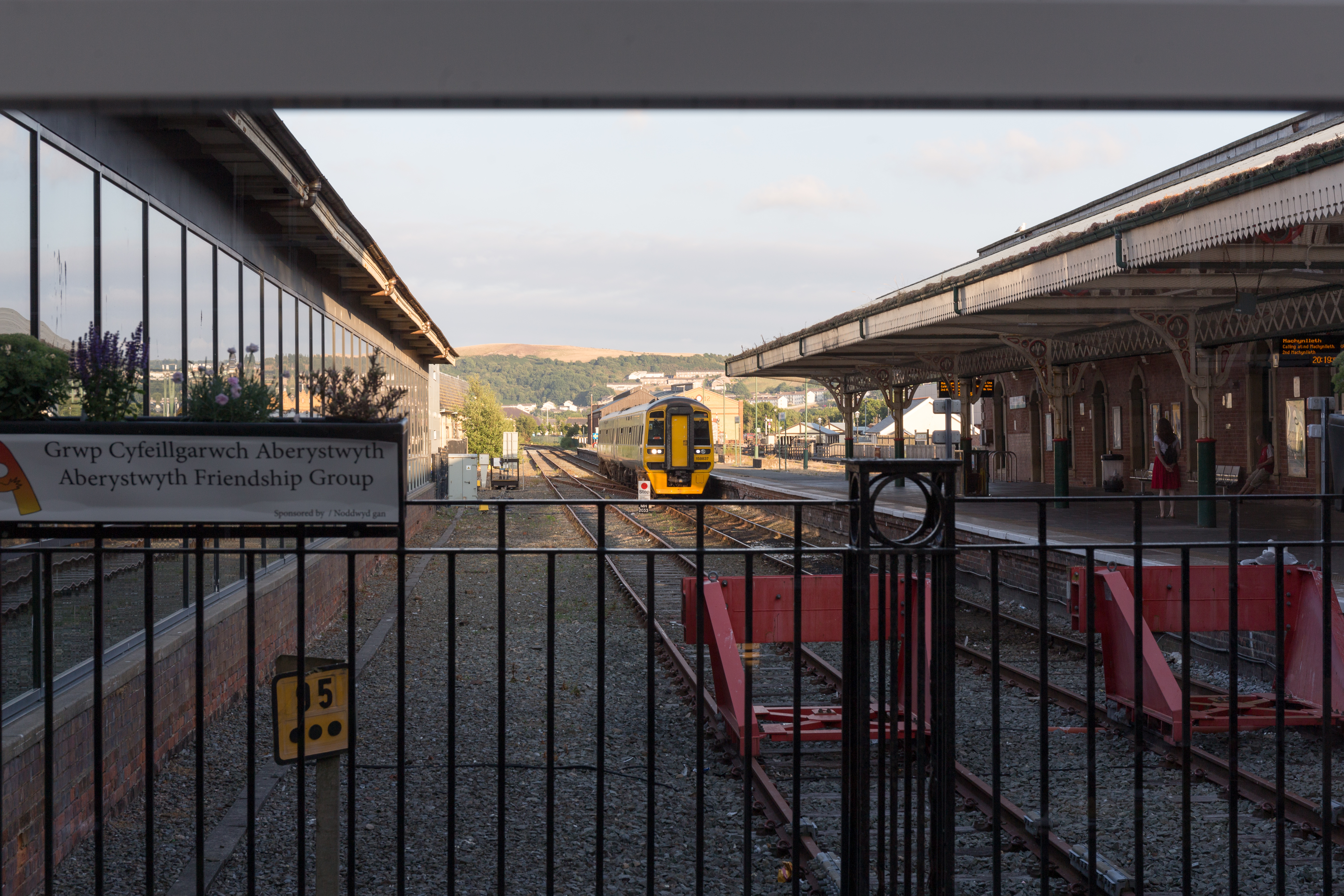
Aberystwyth railway station platforms.

Official talks of reopening started in 2014 when First Minister Carwyn Jones shared his support towards the reopening, and it was adopted as an official policy of the Welsh Liberal Democrats. The next two years were followed by support from Carmarthenshire County Council, Ceredigion County Council, the Minister for Science, Economy and Transport (Welsh Government) and Plaid Cymru. Official talks and meetings included Stephen Crabb MP, Secretary of State for Wales and James Price, Director General, Economy, Science and Transport (Welsh Government) shortly followed by the AECOM report.

In October 2016, the Welsh government announced it would be allocating £300,000 towards funding a feasibility report into re-opening the railway as part of the draft 2017–18 budget. The study is being carried out by engineering consultancy, Mott MacDonald and began in September 2017. Subsequently, Ken Skates, the Welsh Transport Minister consulted the Secretary of State for Transport, Grant Shapps, explaining that the reopening of the line was important to revitalise the Welsh economy following the COVID-19 pandemic.

In October 2018, the Welsh Government published the full feasibility study which showed that there were no major obstacles to reopening and that the project would cost up to £775m although this was subject to a number of unknown further costs being determined such as the crossing of Trawscoed Bog. In September 2020, this was revised to £620 million by the campaign group Traws Link Cymru. The group's report concluded that 97% of the original trackbed was already clear and that reopening the line is realistic.

In 2022, the Welsh government's National Transport Delivery Plan suggested that the case for a rail link between the south of Wales and Aberystwyth could be made by 2025 and the plan and design drawn up by 2027. The document also suggested that planning could continue beyond that point.

In December 2022, former Ceredigion MP and leader of Welsh Liberal Democrats, Mark Williams said that an Aberystwyth-Carmarthen rail link could be a major factor in keeping young people and skilled workers and build up the economy in the area.

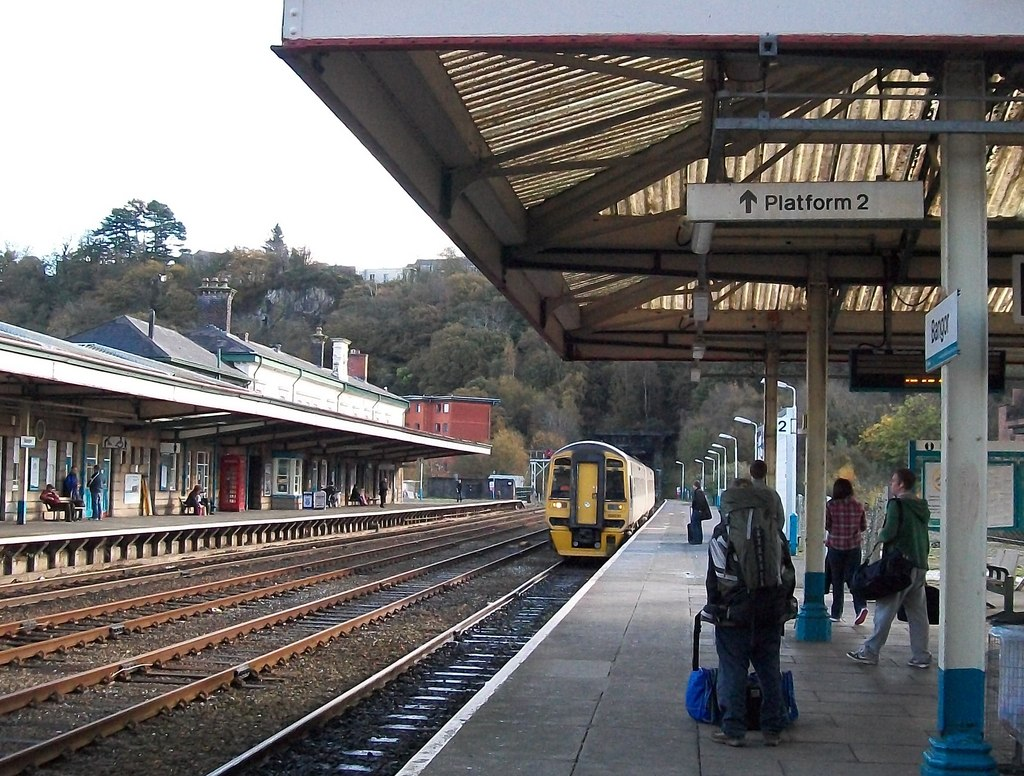
Bangor railway station platforms

=== Bangor–Afon Wen ===
In November 2020, regional MS Llyr Gruffydd described the “gaping hole” in rail infrastructure and that re-opening the rail link between Bangor and Afon Wen would “help integrate public transport in Gwynedd and down the western coast of Wales.”

In 2021, a report by the Welsh government showed a green arrow pointing southwards from Bangor to Afon Wen. This was interpreted by the campaign group "Traws Link Cymru" that Afon Wen to Bangor or a part of the route is now being considered as part of a "North Wales Metro".

A feasibility study published in January 2025 by AtkinsRéalis, on behalf of the Transport for Wales, examined the potential for reopening the former railway line between Bangor and Afon Wen in North West Wales, a route approximately 43.7 km in length that was closed during the 1960s. The study identifies a proposed indicative preferred route, largely following the original alignment, where feasible, particularly where land remains under Welsh Government or local authority ownership or is used for transport purposes such as active travel routes or heritage railways.

The route is divided into five sections (A–E), with assessments made regarding the required level of intervention — categorised as Minimal, Moderate, High, or Very High — based on engineering challenges and potential public impact. Only around 35% of the route requires minimal interventions, while roughly 15% faces high or very high intervention needs, particularly in urbanised areas such as Caernarfon and Bangor.

Significant challenges identified include:

- Land Use Changes: Widespread development on or near the original trackbed, including residential, commercial, and agricultural land.
- Civil Engineering Works: The need for new or replacement overbridges, underbridges, retaining walls, and embankments. In total, 69 civil or geotechnical interventions are currently proposed.
- Road Interfaces: 79 road crossings would require various interventions, such as roundabout reconfiguration and gated crossings.
- Property Interfaces: Conflicts with existing buildings and businesses, particularly in Caernarfon, Y Felinheli, and Groeslon, prompting proposals for short sections of street-level tram running.
- Active Travel Routes: Where existing cycle routes conflict with the proposed railway, diversions will be required.

To address these constraints, the study recommends using Tram-Train vehicles (similar to those such as British Rail Class 398) operating primarily in tram mode, enabling integration into the urban landscape and minimising disruption. Approximately 91% of the route would operate in off-street tram mode, with some sections requiring on-street integration.

The study proposes the development of a detailed timetable analysis to determine whether the tram mode provides sufficient speeds for the planned services or whether heavier rail interventions would be needed. It also recommends further environmental, structural, and land ownership surveys in later project stages.

== See also ==
- Carnarvonshire Railway
- Transport for Wales
- West Wales
