= Teaching of Welsh history =

Until the latter part of the 20th century, the teaching of Welsh history was predominantly taught from a British or Southern English perspective. In recent decades, there has been a notable increase in emphasis on the teaching of Welsh history, a trend that has persisted into the 21st century.

Presently, it is mandatory for schools in Wales to incorporate Welsh history into their curriculum. This requirement was not enforced until the 1990s. This mandatory inclusion of Welsh history is now an integral component of the Curriculum for Wales (2022–present), as stipulated by the Welsh Government. As part of this new curriculum, the teaching of Welsh history, alongside the study of ethnic minority history, has been introduced and mandated since September 2022.

== Teaching of Welsh history ==
=== Before 1939 ===
As a result of the Welsh Intermediate Education Act 1889, secondary provision in Wales far outstripped that in England before the Second World War. The legislation enacted several of the proposals made by the 1881 Aberdare Committee, appointed to enquire into ‘the state of intermediate and higher education in Wales’, and was one of the first pieces to apply to Wales alone. The committee recommended the founding of two university colleges in Wales (University College of South Wales and Monmouthshire in Cardiff, 1883 and University College of North Wales in Bangor, 1884), and stressed the general dissatisfaction with secondary level provision in Wales. In response, the act created a system of publicly funded intermediate (selective secondary) schools in Wales along with a new system of local administration, and, in so doing, established a firm precedent for ongoing claims over the next century that Wales had distinct educational needs from those across the border.

=== 20th century ===
==== "For Wales, see England" ====
Professor Robert Philips states that, given the significance of historical context in shaping national identity, Welsh students in the 20th century were largely unaware of their nation's distinct past. This assertion is supported by literary evidence, which indicates a prevailing focus on "English" and "British" history, as well as the application of the English curriculum in Wales.

Jeremy Slater says that history education in Wales was "mostly a jumble of Acts of Parliament, of kings and battles in English history, leavened in the latter decades by forays in social and local history." History of the English curriculum was "largely British, or rather Southern English; Celts looked in to starve, emigrate or rebel; the North to invent looms or work in mills; abroad was of interest once it was part of the Empire; foreigners were either, sensibly allies, or, rightly, defeated. Skills - did we even use the word?- were mainly those of recalling accepted facts about famous dead Englishmen, and communicated in a very eccentric literary form, the examination length essay. It was an inherited consensus, based largely on hidden assumptions.

In the 20th century, there were multiple reports concluding that Welsh history was taught inadequately and a recommendation from 1931 that at least one question was asked on Welsh history, which had not been taken on by the WJEC (exam board) after the second world war. this continued until 1967, when the Gittins report called for Welsh students to be taught more Welsh history. This was then blamed on the lack of curriculum direction following the Education Act 1944 and lack of Welsh devolved institutions. The Butler Education Act of 1944 implemented three stages of education, primary, secondary, and further, which finally replaced the old parallel system whereby the only education open to the majority was an elementary one. After this, in Industrial Wales, particularly, the primary schools were little different from those of England as in 1961, only 17.6 per cent of Welsh children between the ages of five and fifteen could speak or understand Welsh. The only inclusion of Welsh history was a ration of Welsh history and occasional local or Welsh mention, with no nationalized policy. Proposed reasons include English control in Wales, lack of Welsh devolved institutions and suspicions in the South Wales industrialized areas of Welsh nationalism.

==== Improvement ====
In the 60s and 70s the quality and quantity of resources with an emphasis on Wales improved including works sponsored by the University of Wales Press and the Board of Celtic Studies. This also led to an improvement in school resources. In the late 70s and 80s, Her Majesty's Inspectorate of Education and the Welsh Office sponsored heritage and culture initiatives which also improved school resources. In the early 1980s, education of Welsh history was still inconsistent and inadequate. The GCSE was introduced in 1986 and led to some development of Wales specific resources but Welsh history teaching was still not mandatory. The Education Reform Act 1988 then legislated for a national curriculum in England and Wales.

==== Welsh History Committee ====
In 1982, the Association of History Teachers of Wales (AHTW) formed which led to the establishment of a committee on history curriculum in Wales. In 1989, the AHTW appointed the National Curriculum History Committee for Wales (HCW) under the chairmanship of Rees Davies. They advised the Secretary of State for Wales on "the content of Welsh history which should be incorporated into the history curriculum in Wales’ through a report which set out and justified a balanced and complete curriculum for history in Wales".

In 1990, the HCW produced a final report that said, "The history of Wales is the history of a distinct people and nation. That is how it has been and is perceived by Welsh men and women. It is true that since the thirteenth century Wales has not had a separate machinery of government, or the other organs of statehood. She has, however, retained her own language and culture and a strong awareness of a separate identity."

An English equivalent was also produced and the production of two reports showed that there existed a unique cultural, temporal and national Welsh existence, which was of interest to historians. The two reports, one by the Welsh committee and one by the English committee, led to the 1991 history statutory orders. Since 1995, the Curriculum Cymreig became a statutory common requirement in every National Curriculum subject in Wales meaning that, "In Wales, pupils should be given opportunities, where appropriate, in their studies to develop and apply knowledge and understanding of cultural, economic, historical and linguistic characteristics of Wales (Welsh Office, 1995). By the 1990s a distinct curriculum in Wales had become established. Welsh history had become compulsory within British, European and World contexts between the ages of 5 and 14.

=== Devolved era ===
==== Criticism of lack of Welsh history ====
In 2015, Welsh historian Elin Jones said that Welsh pupils were "deprived" of not being taught history from a Welsh perspective, and that there should be a far bigger emphasis on Welsh history, with there being "very little evidence" of this. She added that nothing had improved since her 2013 report for the Welsh government. Dr Jones added, "I did a soft consultation by going to public libraries and talking to the public when I was preparing my report and very many people said to me that their education had robbed them of the opportunity to learn about their own country. And that's a sad thing to learn."

In 2015, 10-15% of History GCSE was about Wales and WJEC CEO Gareth Pierce added that there is a lack of Welsh history teaching but that the WJEC was moving towards GCSE history where of the three units taught, two of these will include a fundamental Welsh perspective.

In 2020, on the national curriculum in Wales UCAC, were concerned about "ability and willingness" to teach Welsh history as not all history teachers are Welsh. Swansea University historian Martin Johnes added that "There is no guarantee that any pupil will learn about medieval conquest, the flooding of Tryweryn, the Second World War, the struggles for civil rights, or the rise of democracy." he added that there is a danger of discrepancy based on which school pupils attend.

A 2021 Estyn report found that Welsh students had "little knowledge" of Welsh history.

In 2022, Plaid Cymru Member of Senedd, Heledd Fychan criticised the lack of Welsh history teaching in Wales, adding that Welsh children know more about England under the Tudors than about the history of Wales. She also criticised Labour politician Neil Kinnock who said that Wales had practically no history between the 16th and 18th centuries.

In the same year, Dr Stephen Thompson of Aberystwyth University has said tat children in Wales in both Welsh and English medium schools are growing up "without any real sense of the history of their own communities and are far more conversant with the history of other countries”.

Teacher, Iwan Jones said "Welsh history has been neglected over the past 30 or 40 years." Jones says that the main area to improve is to provide modern resources for teachers to better teach Welsh history.

Gaynor Legall, of the history group The Heritage & Cultural Exchange had previously said to a Senedd Committee, “I want the kids who live in the docks…to know about north Wales…as much as I want the people in Harlech…to know about the docks and about the coal industry…because it’s about Wales.”

==== History Grounded ====
Elin Jones' book History Grounded was provided to all schools in Wales by the Welsh Government in early 2022 in time for the 2022/2023 academic year. Sian Gwenllian, the designated member from Plaid Cymru for the cooperation agreement, noted that Jones' book adds a "positive development" and will help to support teachers in teaching Welsh history. Gwenllian added that a proper understanding of Welsh history is an "integral part of ensuring that young people in Wales understand their nation’s past, present and future."

==== Lack of teaching skills ====
According to some, there is a lack of investment and a skills gap when it comes to teaching Welsh history in both primary and secondary schools. Education adviser Dr. Huw Griffiths has said that making Welsh history compulsory is a "game changer" but that there is insufficient resources for teachers in Wales. He says that teachers have had far more exposure to the history of the US and the Nazi's than Welsh history and don't have the expertise to teach Welsh history, adding that this is "a vicious circle that we need to break".

Elin Jones has said that she is concerned that the state of Welsh history teaching could be in the "same position as we were 20 years ago". Jones said that she wants to see "more than legislating" and that teachers need to be shown how to deliver the history which includes ethnic minority history and incorporating Welsh history teaching with a wider context. She said that there is no guidance for teachers to deliver this.

==== Lack of teaching resources ====
In 2019, it was reported that due to budget cuts in education since 2010, each student lost over £500 towards their education. This has resulted in teachers feeling pressured to teach students more topics while also having less resources.

According to the UCAC, a teachers' trade union in Wales, there is a lack of resources to teach Welsh History. The UCAC states that teachers should be guided to proper resources so they can plan their curriculums appropriately. Otherwise, even with the new Curriculum for Wales 2020, teachers may simply revert to their old lesson plans. The union also believes that the available resources they do have to teach Welsh history are not from a Welsh perspective. This lack of proper teaching resources has resulted in tokenistic education of Welsh history. To quote them directly,

“If resources are readily available from the Welsh dimension, showing the Welsh dimension, then they will be used more, but in the past a lot of the resources were, I wouldn’t say Anglo-centric, but they were British-viewing rather than specifically Welsh-viewed. I think the biggest thing that’s needed is some exemplar materials to show what is it people need to deliver the new curriculum properly.”

Prominent Welsh historian Dr. Elin Jones stated that local resources, such as history societies, had a lot to offer regarding Welsh History. However, a conflict of interest may arise when sourcing from local resources due to the want to standardize Welsh history. For example, the Owain Glyndwr Society stated that, “Pupils living in the valleys of South Wales may well end up with an in depth knowledge of the coal industry, but will probably have very little knowledge of the slate industry in Gwynedd."

Furthermore, the Welsh government has stated that they will hold National Network conversations to aid the development of common techniques for teaching Welsh history. They've also stated that they will continue to work with historians and academics to support teachers with developing curriculums.

==== Teaching of ethnic minority history ====
A 2021 Estyn report showed that Welsh students have little knowledge of diverse history. Wales was set to become the first country in the UK to make ethnic minority history a mandatory part of the school curriculum, set to be implemented in September 2022.

Jones said that she wants to see "more than legislating" and that teachers need to shown how to deliver the history which includes ethnic minority history and incorporating Welsh history teaching with a wider context. She said that there is no guidance for teachers to deliver this.

The Welsh education minister, Kirsty Williams said in March 2021, that under new changes to the school, from September 2022, BAME (Black, Asian and minority ethnic) history would be taught in schools.

== 21st century curricula ==
=== 2008 Curriculum ===
The Curriculum 2008 is used in schools in Wales until it is fully replaced by the Curriculum for Wales which was implemented from 2022. Pupils aged 7–14 are taught according to the Curriculum Cymreig including a teaching of the cultural, economic, environmental, historical and linguistic characteristics of Wales. Pupils aged 14–19 are taught via the Wales, Europe and the World which includes the political, social, economic and cultural aspects of Wales and as part of the world.

=== 2022 Curriculum ===
In 2012, the Welsh government set up a task group headed by historian Elin Jones to review of history, Welsh history and the Curriculum Cymreig and minister Leighton Andrews saying that there had been significant increase in interest in the history of Wales over the preceding decade. This followed ACCAC's guidance on ‘Developing the Curriculum Cymreig’ in 2003. In 2013 “The Cwricwlwm Cymreig, history and the story of Wales report” was published. In 2015 Professor Graham Donaldson built on this report in developing a Cwricwlwm Cymreig that should have six Areas of Learning and Experience (AoLE) and that each AoLE should have a Welsh dimension and an international perspective. All schools were set to have access to the new Curriculum for Wales from 2020 with the goal of implementation in September 2022, per the cooperation agreement in the Senedd between the Welsh Labour Government and Plaid Cymru.
