= Education administration in the United Kingdom =

The administration of education policy in the Britain began in the 19th century. Official mandate of education began with the Elementary Education Act 1870 (33 & 34 Vict. c. 75) for England and Wales, and the Education (Scotland) Act 1872 for Scotland. Education policy has always been run separately for the component nations of Britain, and is now a devolved matter (by the Northern Ireland Constitution Act 1973, the Scotland Act 1998, and the Government of Wales Act 1998 - each as amended).

== England ==
As there is no devolved government for England, the administration of education policy for the nation has been carried out by a number of different British central government departments since the 19th century. Key events in Education in England have been the Elementary Education Act 1870 (33 & 34 Vict. c. 75), the Education Act 1902, the Education Act 1944, and the Education Reform Act 1988.

=== 19th century ===
Before the latter-part of the 19th century education was a private matter, and there was no governmental policy lead. Some education services were provided by the Church (dating back to a Papal proclamation in the 11th century).

A Committee of the Privy Council was appointed in 1839 to supervise the distribution of certain Government grants in the education field. The members of the Committee were the Lord President of the Council, the Secretaries of State, the First Lord of the Treasury, and the Chancellor of the Exchequer. From 1857 a Vice President was appointed who took responsibility for policy, leading to the creation of the Education Office.

With the 1870 Act the Education Office was given the task to manage the national process and commission local school boards in boroughs and parishes where they were requested.

The Board of Education Act 1899 took effect in 1900, renaming the Education Office to the Board of Education was created which managed the national process and commissioned local school boards in boroughs and parishes where they were found to be needed.

=== 20th century ===
The Education Act 1902 formalised the relationship between central government and education delivery by abolishing the 2568 school boards set up by the 1870 Act, and transferring their duties (and schools) to local government (borough and county councils) in a new guise as local education authorities.

The Education Act 1944 changed the system of education in England by forming the Tripartite System wherein secondary schools were mandated in one of four forms (Grammar, Comprehensive, Secondary Modern, and Secondary Technical schools), and renamed the Board of Education to the Ministry of Education.

The Department of Education and Science (DES) was created in 1964 as the merger of the Ministry of Education with that of the Ministry of Science following the Prime Minister Harold Wilson's focus on the "white heat of technology".

The 1988 Act brought in the concept of external validation of teacher performance and a support framework for teachers to use as the core of their syllabus, in the form of the National Curriculum.

In 1995 the DES was merged with the Benefits Agency and split off the Office of Science and Technology to become the Department for Education and Employment (DfEE).

=== 21st century ===
After the 2001 General Election, the DfEE and the Department for Social Security were combined and re-split into the Department for Education and Skills (DfES) and the Department for Work and Pensions.

In 2007, when Gordon Brown became Prime Minister, he split the education ministerial portfolio into two. The Department for Children, Schools and Families (DCSF) was formed with board responsibilities for children up to the age of 14, and for some aspects up to 19, taking on some social care responsibilities from the Department for Health. The Department for Innovation, Universities and Skills (DIUS) took over responsibility for all higher and further education and science policy, taking on the Government Office for Science, which by then included the Office of Science and Technology that had split off from DES in 1994.

In 2009, DIUS was merged with parts of the Department of Trade and Industry to form the Department for Business, Innovation and Skills (BIS), but with no change in the scope of its education policy remit.

== Northern Ireland ==
Education policy in Northern Ireland is run by the Northern Ireland Department of Education.

== Scotland ==
Education policy in Scotland has always been run on its own lines. Since devolution it has transferred from the defunct Scottish Office to the Scottish Government.

== Wales ==
Education policy in Wales was run as with that of England until devolution in 1998. Since then it has been run under the Welsh Government.
