= Northern Ireland Curriculum =

National curriculum for schools

The National Curriculum of Northern Ireland identifies the minimum requirements of skills for each subject and the activities to develop and applied the skills .

== History ==
Before 1988 schools had total autonomy and teachers devised the curriculum for their pupils. Margaret Thatcher imposed the first 'common curriculum' for three of the four nations. Teachers opposed this prescriptive move. The first curriculum review took place in 1998–1999 in England and 2000–2004 in Northern Ireland, with a further review in Northern Ireland in 2010. The 1988 curriculum was rigidly defined by subject, prescribing both the content and the pedagogy, and had neither teacher input nor testing. It proved over-ambitious and content-laden and was unmanageable. Cross-curriculum working and personal development was not covered. In England the Dearing Report trimmed the content, but did not change the structure; the review in Northern Ireland was more thorough, and addressed the issue phase by phase.

== Structure of the national curriculum ==
=== Foundation Stage ===
Language and Literacy
Talking and Listening
Reading
Writing
Mathematics and Numeracy
Number
Measures
Shape and Space
Sorting
Patterns and Relationships
The Arts
Art and design
Music
Drama
The World Around Us
The World Around Us
Personal Development and Mutual Understanding
Personal Understanding and Health
Mutual Understanding in the Local and Wider Community
Physical Development and Movement
Physical Development and Movement

== Areas of learning and skills ==
Areas of learning
Language and Literacy
Mathematics and Numeracy
Modern Languages
The Arts
Environment and Society
Science and Technology
Learning for Life and Work
Physical Education
Cross-Curricular Skills
Communication
Using ICT
Using Mathematics
Other Skills
Problem Solving
Working with others
Self-Management

== Key stage 3 ==
Key Stage 3 students are 11-14 year olds (Years 8, 9, and Year 10 in the Northern Ireland system). This is the first post-primary keystage.

== Key stage 4 - Entitlement Framework ==
"Every school must offer at least 24 courses at Key Stage 4, and 27 in the post-16 category. In addition, at least one third of the courses offered must be general and one third applied; that is the minimum figure", said Peter Wier. This was subsequently reduced to 21- of which one-third must be general courses, and one third applied courses. All secondary schools in Northern Ireland are in Area Learning Communities (ALC) where they are encouraged to co-operate, and deliver 'shared education'. To fulfill the required 21 courses a school is encouraged run a joint course with a neighbouring school and extra funding is available to help them do so.

Key Stage 4 students are 14 to 16 year olds (Year 11 and Year 12 in the Northern Ireland system). These students will study for GCSEs or an equivalent. Schools offer GCSE courses that map to the areas of learning- to provide a balanced offer.

== See also ==
- Education Reform Act 1988
- National Curriculum for England
