= Curriculum for Wales (2022–present) =

National curriculum being introduced

The Curriculum for Wales (CfW; Welsh: Cwricwlwm i Gymru) is the curriculum which is being introduced in state-funded education in Wales for pupils aged three to sixteen years. The curriculum's rollout began in 2022. Since September 2023, the Curriculum for Wales has been statutory for all pupils up to Year 9, with the roll-out continuing each year and reaching Year 11 in 2026-2027. And since September 2025 the first section of 'Made-for-Wales' GSCEs have been taught. The curriculum has been developed based on a report commissioned in 2014. Amongst other changes, it gives schools greater autonomy over what they teach children. Views on the curriculum have been varied.

== History ==
Opening page of the Curriculum and Assessment (Wales) Act 2021

In 2014, the Welsh Government commissioned Graham Donaldson, a professor at the University of Glasgow who had worked on reforms to education in Scotland, to conduct a report on reforming the curriculum in Wales. In the following year he published a report called Successful Futures, which recommended a greater emphasis on computing skills, giving schools more control over what they taught and creating more of a sense of natural progression through school. A few months later the Welsh Education Minister at the time, Huw Lewis, promised that the report would be implemented in full within eight years.

Although the curriculum was initially planned to begin being taught in 2021, it was later delayed until 2022. On 6 July 2020, Kirsty Williams the Welsh Minister for Education at the time, introduced the Curriculum and Assessment (Wales) Act 2021 which formed the legal basis for the new curriculum. The bill was latter passed in March 2021.

=== Implementation ===
The new system was planned to be introduced first for children in primary school and their first year of secondary school before being rolled out further as that age cohort progressed towards the end of their schooling, meaning that some students would still be using the old system until 2026. Due to the COVID-19 pandemic schools were allowed to delay teaching the new curriculum in the first and second years of secondary school until 2023. Nearly half of all secondary schools chose to introduce the new curriculum to Year 7 in 2022.

Academic Year	New curriculum introduced to Year Group
2022-2023	Nursery to Year 6 and Year 7 (in participating secondary schools)
2023-2024	Year 8
2024-2025	Year 9
2025-2026	Year 10
2026-2027	Year 11

== Instruction ==
The curriculum applies to all learners aged from three to sixteen in maintained or funded non-maintained nursery education. The new curriculum is designed to include more emphasis on skills, experiences and areas such as "digital skills, adaptability and creativity" as well as knowledge. The curriculum groups education into six "Areas of Learning and Experience", with the intention of helping teachers draw links between subjects and teach topics in a broad way, though traditional subjects will still be taught. Within a basic framework of goals and learning areas, it give schools freedom to develop their own curriculum to suit the needs of their pupils. Instruction is grouped into six different areas:

- Languages, Literacy and Communication
- Mathematics and Numeracy
- Science and Technology
- Health and Well-being
- Humanities
- Expressive Arts

The only specific subjects which all schools are obliged to teach are the English and Welsh languages along with:

- Literacy, numeracy and digital competence
- Religion, values and ethics
- Relationships and sexuality education

Other changes include a greater emphasis on the history of Wales and ethnic minority groups, which reports by Estyn in previous years suggested had often been poor, and the removal of parents' right to opt out their children from sex education classes.

To accompany the introduction of the new curriculum a new body, Adnodd, has been set up which has the responsibility of commissioning bilingual educational resources.

== Assessment and progression ==
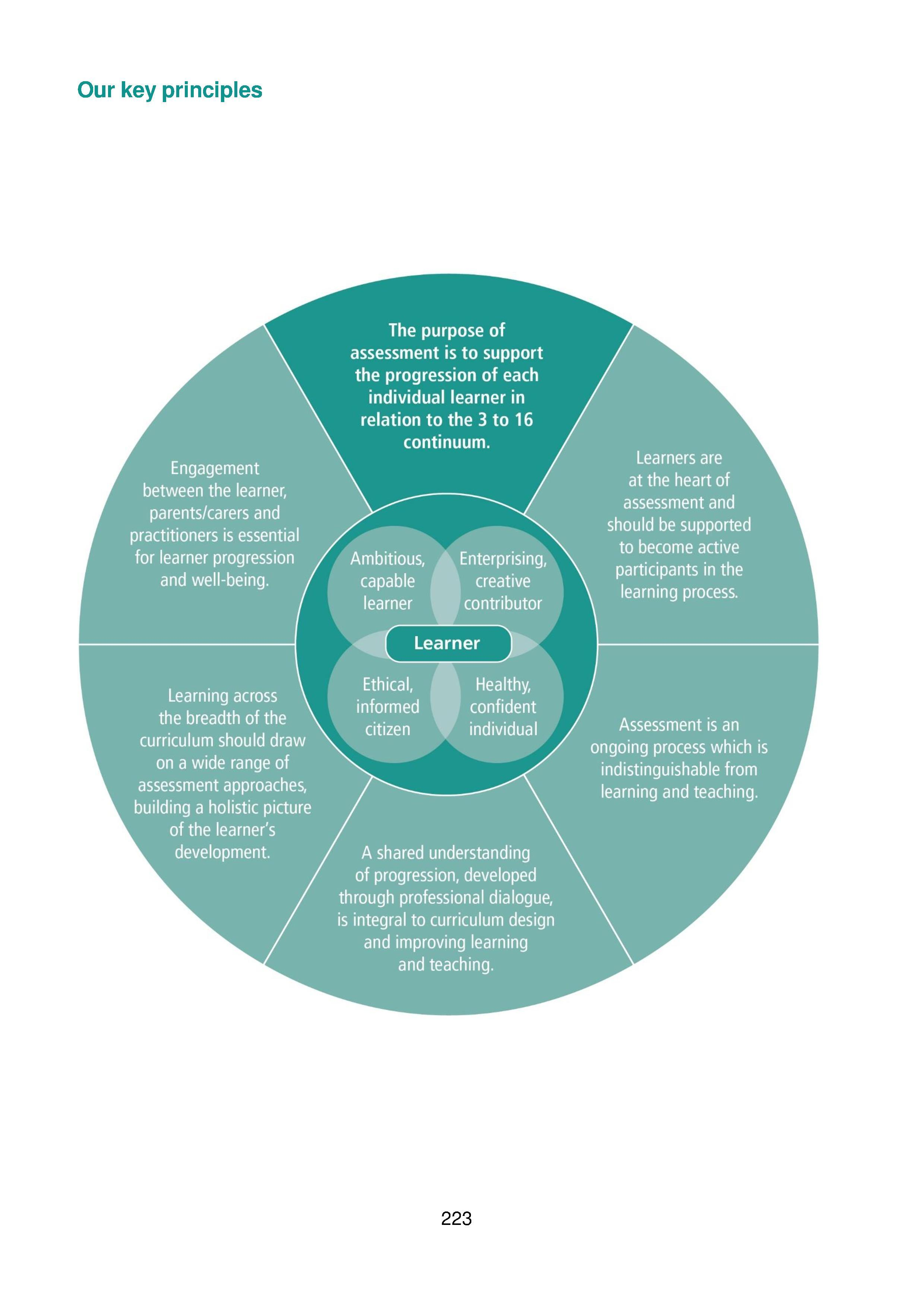
Page from Welsh Government guidance on the key principles of assessments within the new curriculum.

One of Donaldson's initial recommendations for the new curriculum was that school should be made into more of a single "journey" for a child, rather than the way he argued pupils and teachers had previously seen the process as a series of shorter chunks. This could include, for instance, more cooperation between primary and secondary schools. The key stages into which a child's time at school were previously broken are replaced with "progression steps" with guidance of what level pupils are expected to reach at different ages. These take place at age five, eight, eleven, fourteen and sixteen years old. The standardised literary and numeracy tests which seven- to fourteen-year-old children had taken annually since 2013 were replaced in 2021 with personalised online assessments.

=== GCSEs ===
Since September 2025 the first wave of 'Made-for-Wales' GSCEs have been taught, with first awarding due in 2027. The intention is that school-leaving exams will be reformed to reflect the new structure and to put less emphasis on exams (except maths). Multiple qualifications such as English, Welsh and maths have been merged into one for each subject. New GCSEs will be created in subjects such as "dance" and "digital media and film", these and other reformed GCSEs such as history will be introduced in Schools from September 2026. The Welsh Baccalaureate for 14 to 16 year olds will be replaced by the "skills suite" from September 2027.

There was a plan to discontinue the separate optional GCSEs of chemistry, physics and biology and introduce a double science and single science qualification. But this was delayed pending a further consultation in 2029. An introduction of a standalone GCSE in British Sign Language was also scrapped.

In addition there will be a new brand of vocational qualifications, called VCSEs, in subjects like "retail and customer service" and "nature restoration" will be introduced in Wales from September 2027.

=== A-Levels ===
Despite the new curriculum only covering ages three to 16 years old the changes to the education system will have an effect on post-16 education. No changes have been announced yet but in 2024 the qualifications regulator in Wales, Qualifications Wales, asked for a review to be conducted by WJEC on all AS and A levels. This review will look if there are 'inconsistencies with, or gaps in relation to, the new GCSEs and related qualifications'. A more comprehensive review of A-Levels in Welsh (first language) and Welsh second language will be conducted.

== Response ==
Surveys of teachers suggested that they broadly supported the changes being introduced. Journalists from the news website Wales Online spoke in 2022 to teachers and students at Crickhowell High School which had been using the new curriculum for several years. The children interviewed felt that the way the curriculum linked subjects together made their studies feel more relevant to them and improved their understanding. The staff also praised the new structure. The headteacher said that in her view,

Everything we do now we try to pull subjects together. I think it makes learners more confident and more aware of individual skills ... We went from a knowledge-based curriculum to a more interactive new curriculum. It's a structure that changes school ethos and culture ... Students now feel they have better relationships with their teachers and are more interactive with their learning. That's not to say they just want to do easy things. It's raised aspirations and expectations. What we need in 2022 is vastly different from what we needed 10 years ago.

Terry Mackie, an expert in Welsh education, criticised the draft of the curriculum published in 2019 as being overly vague, excessively focused on cultural issues and based on little research. He also noted the negative effect a similar curriculum introduced in Scotland had on results. There were also concerns that grouping subjects into faculties could lead to a "dumbing down" of instruction and suggestions that the requirement for schools to develop their own curriculum was an unhelpful distraction. Many teachers and schools believed that they were inadequately prepared to implement the new curriculum, especially after the COVID-19 pandemic.

The parents' group Public Child Protection Wales took legal action against the Welsh government over plans to make sex education compulsory at schools arguing that parents were being "denied their time-honoured right" to choose whether their children were taught the subject. Their attempt to have the introduction of the new relationships and sex (RSE) curriculum temporarily stopped until the completion of a judicial review into the subject was declined by High Court Justice Tipples on the grounds that "there is nothing in the claimants' evidence that any of the three children to whom RSE will be taught in the 2022/23 academic year will suffer any harm, yet alone any irreparable harm". The group lost the judicial review on the new curriculum, which they saw as biased, with Justice Steyn stating that "teaching should be neutral from a religious perspective, but it is not required to be value neutral".

== See also ==
- Education in Wales
- Education of Welsh History
- Welsh-medium education
- Education in the United Kingdom

=== Other UK curricula ===
- National Curriculum for England – England
- Northern Ireland Curriculum – Northern Ireland
- Curriculum for excellence – Scotland
