= Y Felinheli =

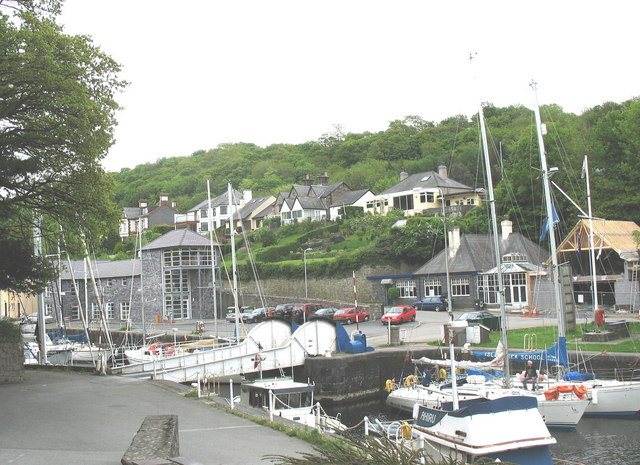
- Road bridge at Y Felinheli marina

- Location within Gwynedd
- Area: 2.28 sq mi (5.9 km^{2})
- Population: 2,330 (2021)
  - Density: 1,022/sq mi (395/km^{2})
- Language: Welsh; English
- OS grid reference: SH525675
- Community: Y Felinheli
- Principal area: Gwynedd
- Preserved county: Gwynedd
- Country: Wales
- Sovereign state: United Kingdom
- Post town: Y FELINHELI
- Postcode district: LL56
- Dialling code: 01248
- Police: North Wales
- Fire: North Wales
- Ambulance: Welsh
- UK Parliament: Dwyfor Meirionnydd
- Senedd Cymru – Welsh Parliament: Gwynedd Maldwyn
- Website: Felinheli Community Council
- List of places UK Wales Gwynedd 53.183°N 4.210°W Map of the community

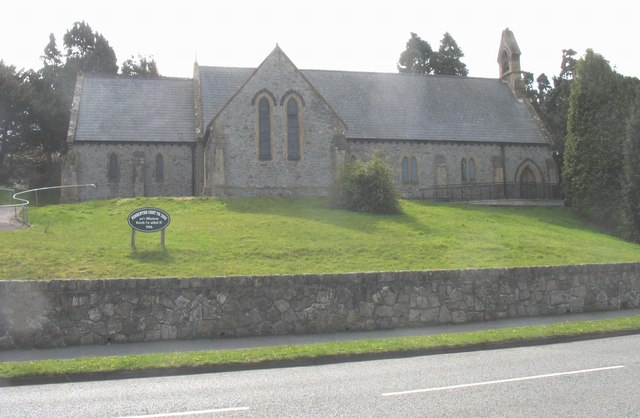
St Mary's Church, an Early English style church built in 1865

Y Felinheli (Welsh pronunciation), formerly known in English as Port Dinorwic, is a village and community beside the Menai Strait (Welsh: Y Fenai or Afon Menai) between Bangor and Caernarfon in Gwynedd, northwest Wales.

== History ==
=== Toponymy ===
Etymologically, its name comes from the Welsh y meaning the, melin meaning mill and heli, meaning brine/salt-water/sea. An alternative interpretation is from Y Felin Heulyn, "the mill on the River Heulyn", which refers to the river that runs into the village.

=== Origins ===
Y Felinheli has its origins in two hamlets, Tafarngrisiau near St Mary's Church and Aberpwll to the north-east where there was a mill on the Afon Heulyn. The mill was rebuilt closer to the sea in 1633 and gave its name to the settlement. The area was largely agricultural until the area was transformed by slate quarrying in the 19th century. A new dock was built in 1828 when lime was extracted at Brynadda and slate and lime were loaded and culm (coal dust or anthracite slack) was brought in to fire the lime kilns.

The owners of the Vaynol Estate, the Assheton Smiths, owned most of the land in Y Felinheli and developed the Dinorwic Quarry in the late 18th century, They also built the harbour to export slate transported to the quay by the Dinorwic Railway, a narrow gauge railway that was subsequently replaced by the Padarn Railway. Industrial expansion gave Y Felinheli (Felin-hely, 1838) the alternative name Port Dinorwig or Port Dinorwic.

== Harbour ==
The harbour is a centre for pleasure boating and sailing. It has moorings, a marina and yacht support businesses, including rigging, sail making and boatyards. The boatyard was constructed before the Second World War for building landing craft. Its slipway, probably the largest in North Wales, is in private ownership; it is usable at most states of tide. The local sailing club organises dinghy racing.

== Demographics ==
=== Population ===
==== Number ====
The population of the village was 2,284 at the 2011 Census. According to the 2021 Census, Y Felinheli's population was 2,330.

==== Density ====
In June 2018, the population density in Y Felinheli was 412 per square kilometre (1,067/sq mi), compared to 49 per square kilometre (127/sq mi) for Gwynedd.

=== Languages ===
According to the 2021 Census, 97.6 per cent of the population considered English or Welsh to be their main language.

==== Welsh ====
In 2021, 68.3 per cent of all usual residents aged 3+ in Y Felinheli can speak Welsh. 78.6 per cent of the population noted that they could speak, read, write or understand Welsh. 95.8 per cent of the population who were born in Wales could speak, read, write or understand Welsh.

The 2011 census noted 64.3 per cent of all usual residents aged 3 years and older in the village could speak Welsh. The 2011 census also noted that 89.4 per cent of all usual residents aged 3+ who were born in Wales could speak Welsh. The Welsh-language skills of Y Felinheli residents were as follows in 2011 and 2021:

| Welsh language skills | Numbers and % of persons aged 3+ | | |
| Welsh language skills | 2011 | 2021 | Change (%) |
|---|---|---|---|
| One or more Welsh language skills | 1,579 (72.1%) | 1775 (78.6%) | +6.5% |
| Can understand spoken Welsh | 1,431 (65.4%) | 1,636 (72.5%) | +7.1% |
| Can speak, read or write Welsh | 1,429 (65.3%) | | |
| Can speak Welsh | 1,407 (64.3%) | 1,542 (68.3%) | +4.0% |
| Can read Welsh | 1,275 (58.3%) | 1,436 (63.6%) | +5.3% |
| Can write Welsh | 1,213 (55.4%) | 1,372 (60.8%) | +5.4% |
| Can speak, read and write Welsh | 1,196 (54.6%) | 1,320 (58.5%) | +3.9% |
| Totals | 2,189 | 2,257 | |

As of June 2023, 63.8 per cent of statutory school age pupils in the village's primary school (Ysgol Y Felinheli) spoke Welsh at home. 75 per cent spoke Welsh at home in 2014.

In 2001, 72.1 per cent of all usual residents aged 3+ in Y Felinheli could speak Welsh. 73.4 per cent could speak it in 1991. In 1981, 80.6 per cent of the population could speak Welsh; 3.1 per cent of the population were monoglot Welsh-speakers.

==== Other languages ====
According to the 2011 Census, 6% of Y Felinheli's population spoke a language other than English or Welsh as their main language. The most common was Arabic, with 2.92% speaking it as their main language.

=== Identity ===
According to the 2011 Census, 59.7% of the population noted that they had Welsh-only national identity, with 35.6 per cent noting that they had no Welsh national identity at all. According to the 2022 Census, 63.8 per cent of the population noted that they had Welsh-only national identity.

=== Country of birth ===
The 2021 Census noted that 93.9 per cent of the population were born in the United Kingdom.

The 2011 Census noted that 91.1 per cent of the population were born in the United Kingdom. 66.1% of the population were born in Wales and 23.8% in England. 5.7% of the population were born outside the European Union.

=== Ethnic Group ===
In 2021, 96.5 per cent of the population identified their ethnic group within the high-level "White" category.

=== Religion ===
The religion question was voluntary in the 2021 Census. Of those in Y Felinheli who answered the question, 49.4 per cent described themselves as having no religion, with 49.2 per cent describing themselves as Christian. Buddhist was the second most common religion.

=== Legal Partnership Status ===
In 2021, 40.1 per cent of residents aged 16 or over were married or in a registered civil partnership. 41.2 percent noted that they had never married or registered in a civil partnership. 9.7 per cent were divorced or had their civil partnership dissolved.

== Notable people ==
- Siân Gwenllian (born 1956) a Welsh Plaid Cymru politician
- Wil Jones (1960–2020) a Welsh portrait artist, guitarist, and teacher.
- Lisa Gwilym (born 1975) a Welsh broadcaster, lives in the village.

== Transport ==
The A487 road by-pass, completed in 1994, has removed much traffic congestion from the main street. The nearest railway station as the crow flies is across the Menai Strait at Llanfairpwll (2 miles (3.2 km)). The next nearest (not involving travelling by boat) is at Bangor (4 miles (6.4 km)).

Historically, the passenger railway station Port Dinorwic was open between 1852 and 1960. There was also a narrow gauge railway running from the town to Dinorwic Quarry on the Dinorwic Railway (later Padarn Railway) to carry slate.

== Education ==
A Welsh-language playgroup Cylch Meithrin Y Felinheli currently serves the community with the support of Mudiad Meithrin.

Ysgol Gynradd Y Felinheli provides Welsh-medium primary education to the village and the surrounding area. As of 2024, there were 171 pupils enrolled at the school.

In terms of secondary education, the village is in the catchment area of three secondary schools, namely Ysgol Tryfan, Ysgol Syr Hugh Owen and Ysgol Friars.

== Governance ==
=== Local Government ===
Y Felinheli forms part of the Bethel a'r Felinheli ward and is currently represented in Cyngor Gwynedd by Plaid Cymru councillors Sasha Ellen Fraser Williams and Gwion Emyr. The village also has a Community Council, currently chaired by Eifion Wyn Williams.

=== Senedd ===
The village lies within the Gwynedd Maldwyn constituency in the Senedd. The constituency is currently represented by six members of the Senedd, namely Siân Gwenllian (Plaid Cymru); Mabon ap Gwynfor (Plaid Cymru); Beca Brown (Plaid Cymru); Elwyn Vaughan (Plaid Cymru); Andrew Griffin (Reform UK) and Claire Johnson-Wood (Reform UK).

=== House of Commons ===
The village is currently represented in the House of Commons by Dwyfor Meirionnydd constituency member Liz Saville Roberts (Plaid Cymru).

== Culture ==
The first National Cerdd Dant Festival was held in Y Felinheli in 1947.

The local carnival committee organises the annual Gŵyl Y Felinheli.

== Sport ==
The local football team, CPD Y Felinheli, celebrated its 40th anniversary in 2017. For the 2021–22 season, the team was selected by the FAW to be part of the newly-created Ardal Leagues North West.

A private members' sailing club, Clwb Hwylio Y Felinheli, has been based in the village, on the banks of the Menai Strait, since 1947. As of 2015, it had 136 youth members who have been trained at the club.
