= Arddleen =

Village in Powys, Wales

Coordinates: 52.736038°N 3.098230°W

Arddleen: Welsh: Arddlin
- Location within Powys
- Population: 418
- OS grid reference: SJ2515
- Principal area: Powys
- Country: Wales
- Sovereign state: United Kingdom
- Police: Dyfed-Powys
- Fire: Mid and West Wales
- Ambulance: Welsh
- UK Parliament: Montgomeryshire and Glyndŵr
- Senedd Cymru – Welsh Parliament: Montgomeryshire

Arddleen or Arddlin is a village in Powys, central Wales. It lies about 5 miles north of Welshpool, in the community of Llandrinio. It had a population of 418 as of the 2011 census, with 31% born in Wales.

== Transport ==
The village was formerly served by Arddleen railway station on the Cambrian Railways network, but is currently served by the X76 bus service. The disused Montgomeryshire Canal also runs through Arddleen and the start of the Guilsfield branch starts just outside of the village.

== Governance ==
The MP for Arddleen is Steve Witherden who has served the Montgomeryshire and Glyndŵr constituency since the 2024 UK General Election. The MSs for Arddleen are Siân Gwenllian (PC), Mabon ap Gwynfor (PC), Beca Brown (PC), Elwyn Vaughan (PC), Claire Johnson-Wood (REF) and Andrew Griffin (REF) and have served the Gwynedd Maldwyn constituency since the 2026 Senedd Election.
