= Dwyfor Meirionnydd =

Dwyfor Meirionnydd may refer to:

- Dwyfor Meirionnydd (UK Parliament constituency), the UK Parliamentary constituency
- Dwyfor Meirionnydd (Senedd constituency), the Senedd constituency
