= Meirionnydd Nant Conwy =

Meirionnydd Nant Conwy may refer to either of two geographically identical former constituencies in Wales:

- Meirionnydd Nant Conwy (UK Parliament constituency) (1983–2010)
- Meirionnydd Nant Conwy (Assembly constituency) (1999–2007)
