= Elfyn Llwyd =

Welsh barrister and politician (born 1951)

The Right Honourable Elfyn Llwyd
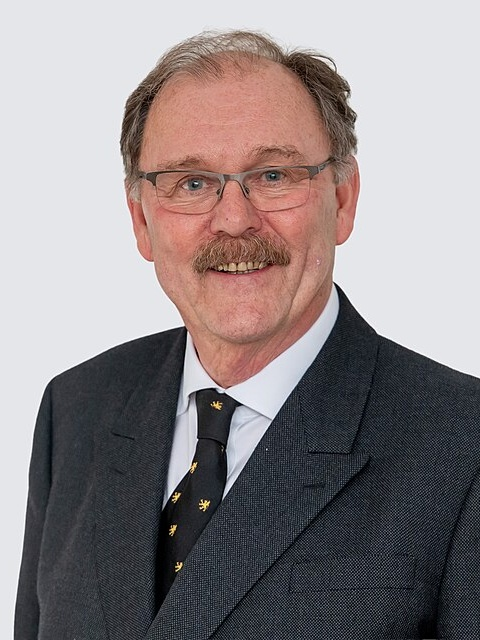
- Official portrait, 2026

Counsel General
- Incumbent
- Assumed office June 2026
- First Minister: Rhun ap Iorwerth
- Preceded by: Julie James

Member of Parliament for Dwyfor Meirionnydd Meirionnydd Nant Conwy (1992–2010)
- In office 9 April 1992 – 30 March 2015
- Preceded by: Dafydd Elis-Thomas
- Succeeded by: Liz Saville Roberts

Personal details
- Born: 26 September 1951 (age 75) Betws-y-Coed, Caernarfonshire, Wales
- Party: Plaid Cymru
- Spouse: Eleri Llwyd
- Education: University of Wales, Aberystwyth
- Occupation: Barrister

Elfyn Llwyd PC (born 26 September 1951) is a Welsh barrister and politician. He was the Member of Parliament for Meirionnydd Nant Conwy in the House of Commons from the 1992 general election until its abolition in 2010, and then for its principal successor constituency of Dwyfor Meirionnydd from 2010 until his retirement in 2015. Llwyd was Plaid Cymru's Westminster parliamentary group leader.

He was announced in August 2021 as the Pro-Chancellor of Aberystwyth University.

== Biography ==
Born in Betws-y-Coed, Gwynedd, Wales, Llwyd was raised in Llanrwst and later went to University of Wales, Aberystwyth, and Chester Law College.

Llwyd worked as a solicitor and subsequently a barrister (called to the bar in 1997) before election to public office. Between 1990 and 1991 he served as President of the Gwynedd Law Society. A fluent Welsh and English speaker, Llwyd is married to Welsh folk singer Eleri Llwyd, and they have two children. His hobbies include pigeon breeding, reading, travelling and rugby.

In December 2013, Llwyd appeared on a special Christmas edition of BBC Two's University Challenge representing Aberystwyth University.

== Member of Parliament ==
Llwyd was first elected to the British Parliament at the 1992, winning the Meirionnydd Nant Conwy constituency, being re-elected in 1997, 2001, and 2005. He took the newly configured Dwyfor Meirionnydd seat at the 2010 British general election with 44.3% of the vote, but there was a 7.3% swing from Plaid Cymru to the Conservatives.

He was appointed to Her Majesty's Privy Council on 9 February 2011.

== Public service ==
Having been elected to public office, his main political interests are home affairs, transport and agriculture. Llwyd credits Saunders Lewis as having most influenced his political thinking.

=== Housing and language controversy ===
In September 2001, Llwyd alluded to Plaid Cymru councillor Seimon Glyn's controversial remarks about a "tidal wave" of English retirees emigrating to Wales and restrictions on second-home ownership proposed for Exmoor National Park when he observed that "it is fine for Exmoor to defend their community but in Wales when you try to say these things it is called racist".

Glyn's comments that English-speaking migrants were "of no use to our communities" had reportedly lost Plaid Cymru votes earlier in the year, and Glyn had earlier apologised for any offence caused by the "out of context" remarks.

Llwyd argued "The language now being used in Exmoor is exactly the same issues as in Wales except that we have an added dimension in Wales of the language and the culture" and called on other parties to join in a debate to "talk about the Exmoor suggestion and see if we can now bring it into Wales" The following spring Snowdonia National Park (Welsh: Parc Cenedlaethol Eryri) and Pembrokeshire Coast National Park (Welsh: Parc Cenedlaethol Arfordir Penfro) authorities followed the example set by Exmoor and began limiting second home ownership within the parks

=== Impeach Blair campaign ===
In August 2004 Llwyd joined Adam Price in a campaign to impeach then Prime Minister of the United Kingdom Tony Blair over the alleged misleading of the UK Parliament and for allegedly making a secret agreement with then US President George W. Bush to overthrow Saddam Hussein, amongst other charges. Llwyd and then Scottish National Party (SNP) group leader Alex Salmond co-drafted the motion.

Impeachment had not been used in the UK for one hundred and fifty years. If successful, it could have seen Blair tried before the House of Lords; however, as expected, the measure failed.

Llwyd had told the Guardian Unlimited that "leading the debate on the unlawfulness of the attack on Iraq - in particular opening a debate calling for the disclosure of the attorney general's opinion in full in March 2004," was his proudest moment.

In November 2005, the campaign announced a new motion (this time with the support of the Liberal Democrats) asking for a Commons committee to examine the conduct of ministers before and after the war. The campaign tabled an Early Day Motion:

"Conduct of Government Policy in relation to the war against Iraq"

"That this House believes that there should be a select committee of 7 Members, being members of Her Majesty's Privy Council, to review the way in which the responsibilities of Government were discharged in relation to Iraq and all matters relevant thereto, in the period leading up to military action in that country in March 2003 and in its aftermath".

The motion collected 151 signatures, including some Labour back-benchers.

By October 2006, Llwyd joined in a three-hour debate on an inquiry into the Iraq War, the first such debate in over two years. The SNP and Plaid Cymru motion proposing a committee of seven senior MPs to review "the way in which the responsibilities of government were discharged in relation to Iraq", was defeated by 298 votes to 273, a Government majority of 25, but was supported by a significant number of opposition MPs, and twelve "rebel" Labour MPs, including Glenda Jackson.

Despite the lack of debate on the original impeachment motion, Llwyd, Price, and others pledged to continue the impeachment campaign. However, with the resignation of Blair on 27 June 2007, the entire issue of impeachment may now be moot.

=== Cash-for-Honours Scandal ===
In March 2007 Elfyn Llwyd was one of three individuals who made complaints about the Labour Government under section 1 of the Honours (Prevention of Abuses) Act 1925 to the Commissioner of the Metropolitan Police. The other complainants were Angus MacNeill MP (Scottish National Party) and an individual who remains unidentified to this day. These three complaints led to a police investigation headed by Assistant Commissioner John Yates. The whole affair was dubbed by some in the media the Cash for Honours scandal.

=== 2007 Welsh Assembly election spending controversy ===
Following the 2007 Welsh Assembly elections, a UK parliamentary standards and privileges committee found Plaid MPs Llwyd, Adam Price and Hywel Williams guilty of improperly advertising during the elections. Though the committee admitted the three did not break any clear rules of the UK House of Commons, the committee believed the timing of the adverts were planned to coincide with the Assembly elections.

Parliamentary funds are available for MPs to communicate with constituents regularly. However, the committee found that the three used this communication allowance improperly as part of Plaid's campaigning during the elections as the adverts were placed in publications with a circulation outside of their respective constituencies.

Of the committee findings, Llwyd said that they would comply with the findings of the committee, but that they had "...acted in good faith throughout, and fully in line with the advice that was offered to us by the DFA (Department of Finance and Administration) at the time of the publication of the reports". The three had to repay the money, about five thousand pounds each, and report the costs as part of Plaid's election spending.

=== Peerage call ===
At the Llandudno party conference 2007, Llwyd encouraged the party to nominate peers into the House of Lords, citing that Plaid peers would "help ensure planned legislation for Wales was not blocked at Westminster", adding that many in the Lords may want to prevent full law-making powers for Wales. In January 2011, Dafydd Wigley joined Lord Elis-Thomas in the House of Lords.

In February 2024, Llwyd was controversially overlooked for a peerage in the 2024 Special Honours in favour of Carmen Smith.

=== Counsel General ===
On 13 May 2026, Llwyd was announced as Rhun ap Iorwerth's choice for Counsel General for Wales, subject to approval by the Senedd.

Parliament of the United Kingdom
Preceded by Dafydd Elis-Thomas	Member of Parliament for Meirionnydd Nant Conwy; 1992–2010	Constituency abolished
New constituency	Member of Parliament for Dwyfor Meirionnydd; 2010–2015	Succeeded by Liz Saville Roberts
