= Robin Williams (physicist) =

Welsh physicist

Professor Sir Robin Williams CBE FRS FLSW HonFInstP

13th Chancellor of Bangor University
- Incumbent
- Assumed office 2022
- Preceded by: George Meyrick

Vice Chancellor of Swansea University
- Preceded by: Brian Clarkson (Principal)
- Succeeded by: Richard Davies

Personal details
- Born: Robert Hughes Williams; 22 December 1941 (age 84)

Sir Robert Hughes Williams, CBE, FRS, FLSW, HonFInstP (born 22 December 1941), commonly known as Robin Williams, is a Welsh physicist and academic specialising in solid state physics and semiconductors, and Chancellor of Bangor University.

== Early life ==
Born on a hill farm at Llanuwchllyn, after attending the village school there Williams was educated at Bala Grammar School before studying Physics at the University College of North Wales, where he graduated BSc and PhD.

== Career ==
Williams is an authority on semiconductors, and his research work has furthered digital electronics. He has developed new methods for the study of semiconductors and was an early user of synchrotron radiation to study the surfaces of solids.

He taught at the New University of Ulster and the University of Wales, College of Cardiff, before serving as Vice-Chancellor of the University of Wales, Swansea, from 1994 to 2003.

== Honours ==
In 1990, Williams was elected a Fellow of the Royal Society (FRS), the United Kingdom's national academy for the sciences. In 2010, he was elected a Founding Fellow of the Learned Society of Wales (FLSW).

He was appointed Commander of the Order of the British Empire (CBE) in the 2004 New Year Honours for services to education and to the community in Swansea and knighted in the 2019 Birthday Honours for services to higher education, research and the Welsh language.

== Selected works ==
- Rhoderick, E. H.; Williams, R. H. (1988). Metal-semiconductor contacts (2nd ed.). Oxford: Clarendon Press. ISBN 9780198593355.
- Morgan, D. V.; Williams, R. H., eds. (1991). Physics and technology of heterojunction devices. Stevenage: Peter Peregrinus. ISBN 9780863412042.
- Davies, G. J.; Williams, R. H. (1994). Semiconductor growth, surfaces, and interfaces (1st ed.). London: Published by Chapman & Hall for the Royal Society. ISBN 9780412577307.
