= Chancellor of Bangor University =

Titular head of Bangor University

- Incumbent; Professor Sir Robin Williams CBE FRS FLSW HonFInstP since 2022
- Member of: University Council
- Appointer: University Council
- Constituting instrument: Royal Charter of Bangor University
- Deputy: Pro-Chancellor (when appointed), Vice-Chancellor
- Salary: sinecure
- Website: www.bangor.ac.uk/vice-chancellor/the-chancellor

The Chancellor is the titular head of Bangor University. Their duties include conferring degrees, acting as an ambassador for the university, and promoting the university and its achievements.

Prior to the university's independence in 2007, the titular head of the institution was the President.

The current chancellor since 2022 is Professor Sir Robin Williams.

== Deputies ==
The university allows for the appointment of up to two pro-chancellors, who act as functional deputies for the chancellor. The vice-chancellor, whilst officially acting on behalf of the chancellor, is the chief executive of the university.

== List of chancellors ==
=== Presidents ===
- 1884–1891 Edward Herbert, 3rd Earl of Powis,
- 1891–1900 William Rathbone
- 1900–1927 Lloyd Tyrell-Kenyon, 4th Baron Kenyon
- 1927–1935 Herbert Gladstone, 1st Viscount Gladstone
- 1935–1940 Lord Howard de Walden
- 1940–1945 William Ormsby-Gore, 4th Baron Harlech
- 1940–1945 Charles Paget, 6th Marquess of Anglesey
- 1947–1982 Lloyd Tyrell-Kenyon, 5th Baron Kenyon
- 1982–1995 William Mars-Jones
- 1995–2000 Cledwyn Hughes
- 2000–2007 Dafydd Elis-Thomas

=== Chancellors ===
- 2007–2017 Dafydd Elis-Thomas
- 2017–2022 George Meyrick
- 2022–present Professor Sir Robin Williams
