= Dafydd Elis-Thomas =

Welsh politician (1946–2025)

The Right Honourable The Lord Elis-Thomas PC
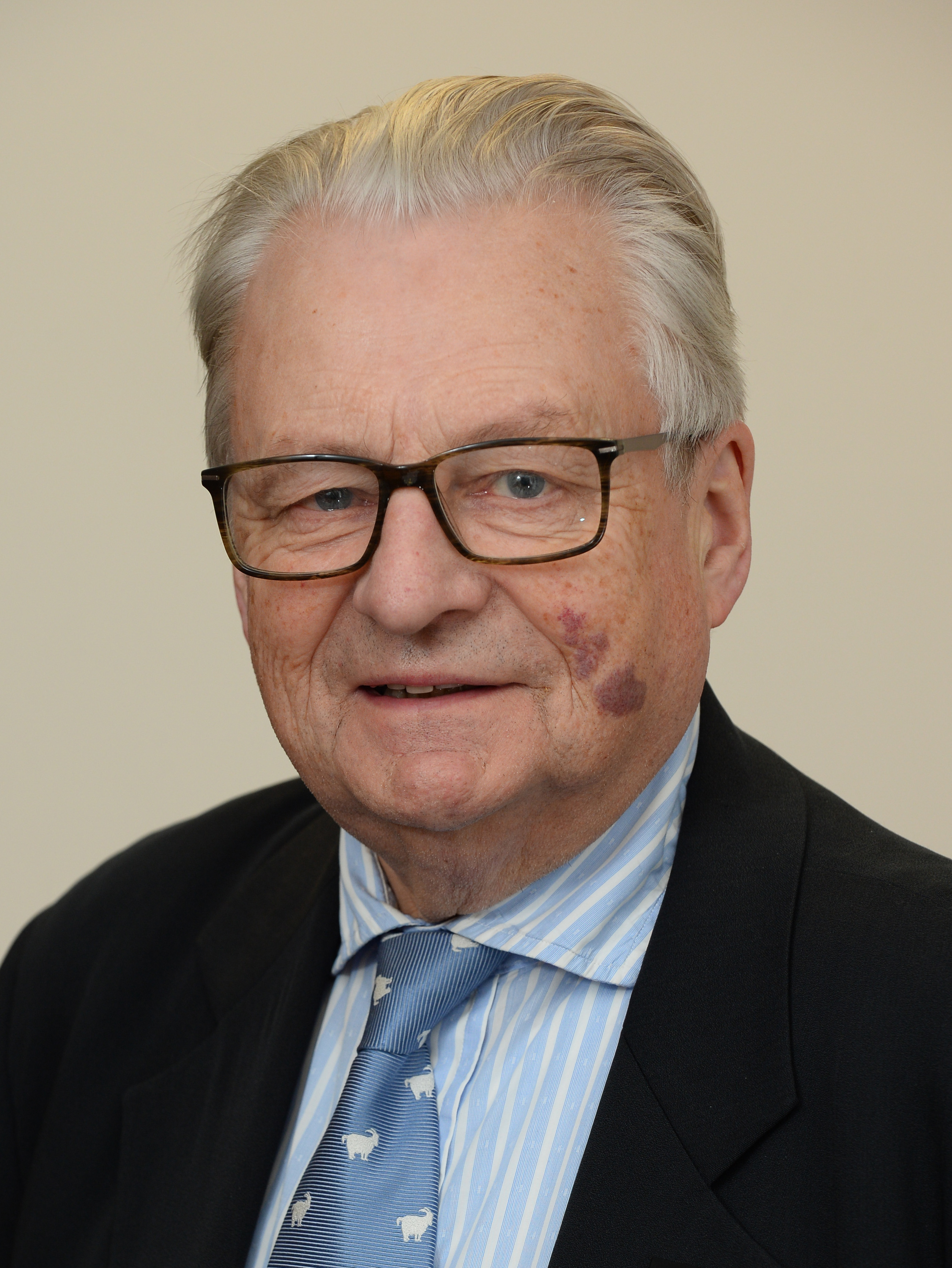
- Official portrait, 2019

Presiding Officer of the National Assembly for Wales
- In office 12 May 1999 – 11 May 2011
- Monarch: Elizabeth II
- First Minister: Alun Michael; Rhodri Morgan; Carwyn Jones
- Deputy: Jane Davidson; John Marek; Rosemary Butler
- Preceded by: Position established
- Succeeded by: Rosemary Butler

Minister for Culture, Sport and Tourism
- In office 3 November 2017 – 13 May 2021
- First Minister: Carwyn Jones; Mark Drakeford
- Preceded by: Ken Skates
- Succeeded by: Dawn Bowden

Assembly Member for Dwyfor Meirionnydd Meirionnydd Nant Conwy (1999–2007)
- In office 6 May 1999 – 29 April 2021
- Preceded by: Position established
- Succeeded by: Mabon ap Gwynfor

Leader of Plaid Cymru
- In office 1984–1991
- Preceded by: Dafydd Wigley
- Succeeded by: Dafydd Wigley
UK Parliamentary representation
Member of the House of Lords
Lord Temporal
Life peerage 18 September 1992 – 7 February 2025
Member of Parliament for Meirionnydd Nant Conwy (Merioneth 1974–1983)
In office 28 February 1974 – 16 March 1992
Preceded by	William Edwards
Succeeded by	Elfyn Llwyd

Personal details
- Born: Dafydd Elis Thomas; 18 October 1946 Carmarthen, Carmarthenshire, Wales
- Died: 7 February 2025 (aged 78)
- Party: Independent (2016–2025)
- Other political affiliations: Plaid Cymru (1970–2016)
- Spouse(s): Elen Williams (m. 1970, divorced) Mair Parry Jones (m. 1993)
- Children: 3

Dafydd Elis Elis-Thomas, Baron Elis-Thomas, PC (né Thomas; 18 October 1946 – 7 February 2025) was a Welsh politician who served as the leader of Plaid Cymru from 1984 to 1991 and represented the Dwyfor Meirionnydd constituency in the Senedd from 1999 to 2021.

Born in Carmarthen, Wales, he was raised in Ceredigion and the Conwy Valley. He represented Merioneth and later Meirionnydd Nant Conwy as a member of Parliament (MP) from 1974 to 1992, and was Presiding Officer of the National Assembly for Wales from the office's inception in 1999 to 2011. Elis-Thomas was a member of the House of Lords and a privy counsellor from 1992 and 2004, respectively, until his death.

From 2007 to 2017 he was the Chancellor of Bangor University. In 2016, he left Plaid Cymru to support Carwyn Jones's government in the Senedd, sitting as an independent. He joined the Welsh government in November 2017 and was Minister for Culture, Sport and Tourism until May 2021. Elis-Thomas applied to rejoin Plaid Cymru in August 2023, but withdrew his application later in the year.

== Background ==
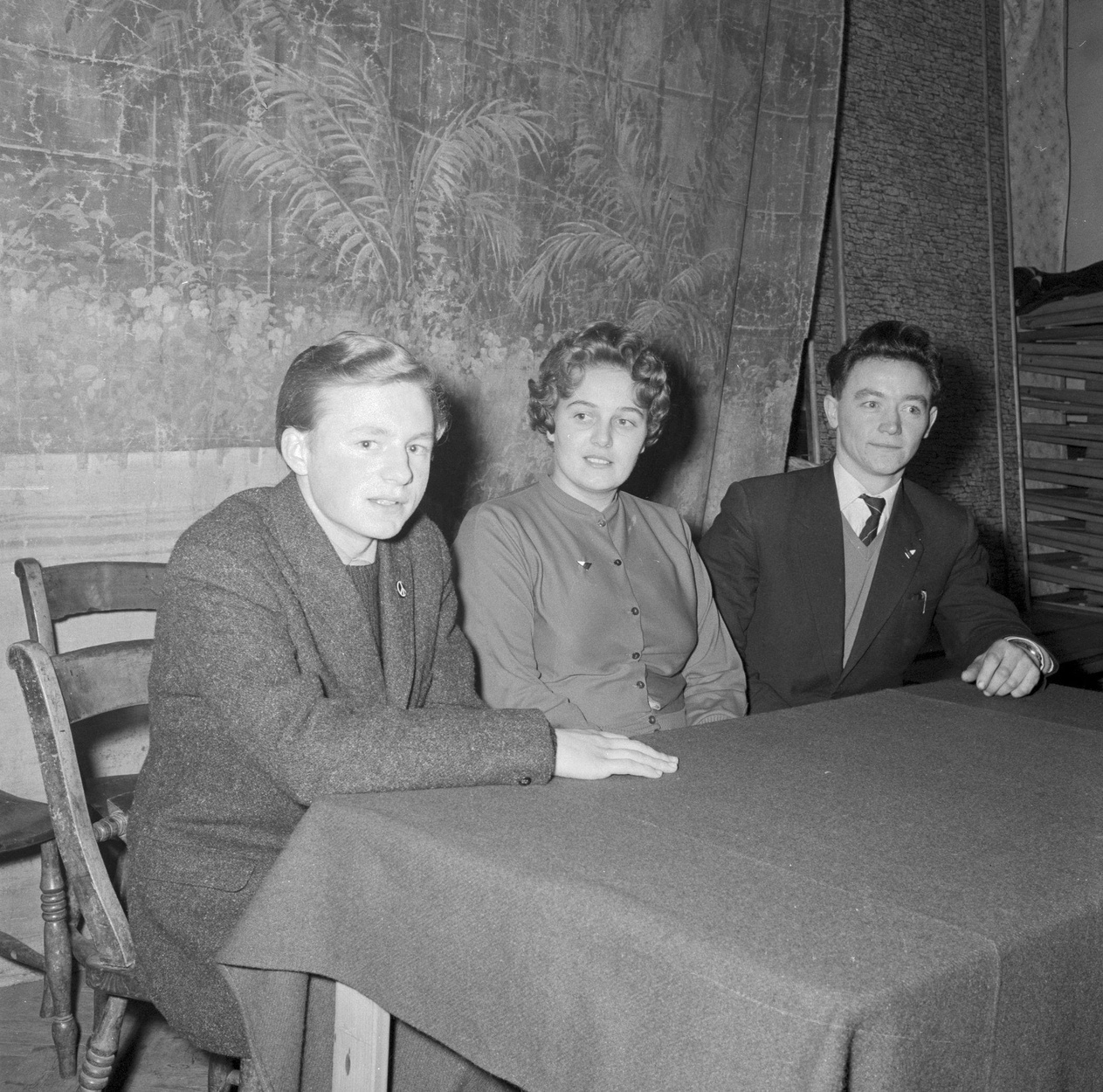
Elis-Thomas (left) at an Urdd Gobaith Cymru public speaking competition in Llanrwst in 1962

Dafydd Elis Thomas was born on 18 October 1946 at Priory Hospital, Carmarthen, and brought up in the Llandysul area of Ceredigion, and in Llanrwst in the Conwy Valley. In 1970, he married Elen Williams and had three sons. They later divorced. From the mid-1980s until 1992 his partner was Marjorie Thompson, the chairwoman of the Campaign for Nuclear Disarmament (CND). In 1993, he married Mair Parry-Jones. Between 1993 and his death, he lived in Llandaff, Cardiff (when working at the Senedd), and Betws-y-Coed (which was in his constituency of Meirionnydd Nant Conwy prior to the 2010 boundary changes).

== Professional career ==
Elis-Thomas was the chairman of the Welsh Language Board between 1994 and 1999, and was a member of the Arts Council of Wales, governor of the British Film Institute and chairman of Screen Wales between 1992 and 1999. He was a director and vice-chairman of Cynefin Environmental Ltd. between 1992 and 1999. A former university lecturer, he was the chancellor and chair of Council at Bangor University between 2000 and 2017, as well as being a member of the governing body of the Church in Wales. He was an honorary president of the anti-fascist organisation Searchlight Cymru.

== Political career and views ==
=== UK Parliament ===
Having come third at Conwy in the 1970 general election, Thomas served as MP for Merioneth between 1974 and 1983, initially as the Baby of the House, and subsequently as MP for Meirionnydd Nant Conwy from 1983 to 1992. On entering the House of Commons after the February 1974 election, he became one of the first MPs to be allowed to take the oath of allegiance in Welsh as well as in English. For most of his time in the House of Commons, he was one of only two Plaid Cymru MPs, alongside Dafydd Wigley. In 1981, Thomas moved the writ in the Westminster Parliament that allowed for the election of Provisional Irish Republican Army hunger striker Bobby Sands in Fermanagh South Tyrone. Thomas was noted for the number of questions he tabled during his time in parliament, through which he secured economic support for Wales, bolstered the status of the Welsh language and played a leading role in thwarting the closure of the Cambrian Coast railway. In 1991 he announced that he would not stand for parliament at the next election.

He was created a life peer on 18 September 1992 as Baron Elis-Thomas, of Nant Conwy in the County of Gwynedd, with a change of his surname from Thomas to Elis-Thomas. He sat as a crossbench peer because at that time he had taken on the non-political role of chair of the Welsh Language Board; upon leaving that post in 1999, he took the Plaid Cymru whip in the Lords until leaving the party in 2016.

=== Senedd ===
Elis-Thomas was elected to the newly established National Assembly for Wales (now called "Senedd Cymru" or "the Welsh Parliament", or simply Senedd) in 1999, representing the Meirionnydd Nant Conwy constituency until the 2007 election, and then the Dwyfor Meirionnydd constituency. He also held the position of Presiding Officer from the Assembly's inception in 1999 until 2011. In the early Assembly he successfully expanded the role of the Office of the Presiding Officer, playing a significant role in establishing de facto separation of powers between the Welsh Assembly and the Welsh Assembly government, despite the lack of separation prescribed by the Government of Wales Act 1998 and the corporate structure of the Assembly.

During his tenure as Presiding Officer, he also expelled Assembly member Leanne Wood from the Assembly chamber during a December 2004 debate after Wood referred to Queen Elizabeth II as "Mrs Windsor" during a debate and refused to withdraw the remark, the first time an AM was ordered out of the chamber.

From 2011, Elis-Thomas was Plaid Cymru's spokesperson for Environment, Energy and Planning before transferring to Rural Affairs, Fisheries and Food in 2012. In October 2016 he left Plaid Cymru, alleging that they were 'not willing to seriously participate in government', describing Brexit as a 'serious constitutional challenge' and a threat to the powers of the Assembly. He remained in the Assembly as an independent member. In November 2017, as part of a Welsh Government reshuffle, Elis-Thomas was appointed as Minister for Culture, Tourism and Sport.

He announced on Dewi Llwyd's BBC Radio Cymru programme on 12 April 2020 that after long consideration and realising that there were many other ways to serve society, he would not be standing for Dwyfor Meirionnydd in the 2021 Senedd election.

=== Europe ===
Thomas, in line with Plaid Cymru policy, was a strong supporter of a "no" vote in the 1975 European Communities referendum. Fourteen years later, he contended unsuccessfully for the North Wales European Parliament seat in the 1989 election. On the eve of the 2016 EU referendum, he and two Labour AMs sponsored a Senedd debate on the motion "The National Assembly believes Wales would be stronger, safer and more prosperous if it were to remain a member of the European Union"; it passed by 44 votes to 9. During the discussion, Elis-Thomas said his stance in the 1975 referendum was something he had "regretted ever since".

== Death and funeral ==
Elis-Thomas died peacefully at his home after a short illness, on 7 February 2025, at the age of 78.

Following his death First Minister Eluned Morgan paid tribute saying: "Wales has lost one of its greatest servants, and many of us have lost an irreplaceable friend. Dafydd was a true giant of Welsh politics and a passionate champion of our nation, our language, and our culture."

In a letter to his widow King Charles III wrote: "Our public life will be so very much the poorer without his thoughtful and stimulating presence. There can be few people who have contributed so much to the lives of their nation, in so many fields, for so long."

Elis-Thomas' funeral was held at Llandaff Cathedral on 14 March 2025 and attended by hundreds of mourners. Following the funeral as part of the procession his body was taken past the Welsh Senedd.

== Legacy ==
A biography of Elis-Thomas by Aled Eirug was published on 22 September 2025.

Parliament of the United Kingdom
Preceded by William Edwards	Member of Parliament for Meirionnydd; 1974–1983	Constituency renamed
New constituency	Member of Parliament for Meirionnydd Nant Conwy; 1983–1992	Succeeded by Elfyn Llwyd
Preceded by Bernadette Devlin	Baby of the House; 1974	Succeeded by Helene Hayman
Senedd
New constituency	Assembly Member for Meirionnydd Nant Conwy; 1999–2007	Constituency abolished
New constituency	Member of the Senedd for Dwyfor Meirionnydd; 2007–2021	Succeeded by Mabon ap Gwynfor
New post	Presiding Officer of the National Assembly for Wales; 1999–2011	Succeeded by Rosemary Butler
New post	Assembly Commission; 2007–2011	Succeeded by Rosemary Butler
Party political offices
Preceded by Phil Williams	Vice-President of Plaid Cymru; 1979–1981	Succeeded by Phil Williams
Preceded by Dafydd Wigley	President of Plaid Cymru; 1984–1991	Succeeded by Dafydd Wigley
Academic offices
Preceded by Cledwyn Hughes	President of Bangor University; 2000–2017	Succeeded by George Meyrick
