= Wil Jones (artist) =

Welsh portrait artist, guitarist, and teacher (1960–2020)

- Born: William Richard Jones; 1960; Wales
- Died: 30 August 2020 (aged 59–60); Y Felinheli, Gwynedd, Wales
- Education: Ysgol Friars; John Moores University
- Known for: Portrait painting, guitarist
- Spouse: Tracey Jones
- Children: 4

William Richard Jones (1960–30 August 2020) was a Welsh portrait artist, guitarist, and teacher. His portrait work has been exhibited around the United Kingdom, notably portraits of Eric Sykes and Norman Wisdom, and a collection of Welsh literary portraits on display at the National Library of Wales.

== Career ==
Having graduated in graphic design from Liverpool Polytechnic and undergone teacher training, Jones became the head of art at Ysgol Dyffryn Nantlle secondary school in 1984 and later became head of art at Ysgol Friars where he was a pupil himself.

He was a member of the band 'Y Cynghorwyr' (The Councillors), playing guitar on a number of releases on Crai in the late 1980s and early 1990s. He worked on a mural at Glynllifon in 1993 as part of the Gwerin Y Graith collection of artworks highlighting the lives of slate miners.

He focused on portrait work as an artist and has four paintings of Welsh writers and performers Wil Sam, Elis Gwyn Jones, Meredydd Evans, and Richard Hughes in the National Library of Wales portraits collection. He painted live portraits with English comedians Eric Sykes and Norman Wisdom which are on display at Gallery Oldham and the Manx Museum respectively. He also made notable portraits of Rhys Ifans, Bryn Terfel, Tom Courtenay, and Kyffin Williams. His work was exhibited at a number of galleries and art prizes including The Best of British Illustration at the Mall Galleries in 1980, the National Eisteddfod of Wales in 1989, and Garrick/Milne Prize exhibition in 2003, where his portrait of Tom Courtenay was chosen for exhibition at Christie's.

Described as an "unorthodox" teacher, he was struck off the teaching register in 2014 for unacceptable professional behaviour, including swearing in the classroom.

== Personal life and death ==
Jones had four children with his wife Tracey, they lived in both Talysarn and Felinheli. He was a board member of the Welsh third tier football team Y Felinheli F.C., as well as being a local councillor and chairperson of the community council in Felinheli.

Known by many in the community as 'Wil Art', he died in August 2020 in Felinheli where he grew up.

== Legacy ==
Jones taught Wales national football team player and artist Owain Fôn Williams at Ysgol Dyffryn Nantlle secondary school. Jones was mentioned in Williams' autobiography as a great teacher that gave him a lot of support and encouraged him to take up art at A level and university before he was offered a contract at Crewe Alexandra. Williams has had his artwork exhibited at the National Library of Wales and Oriel Ynys Mon.
