= Beca Brown =

Welsh politician

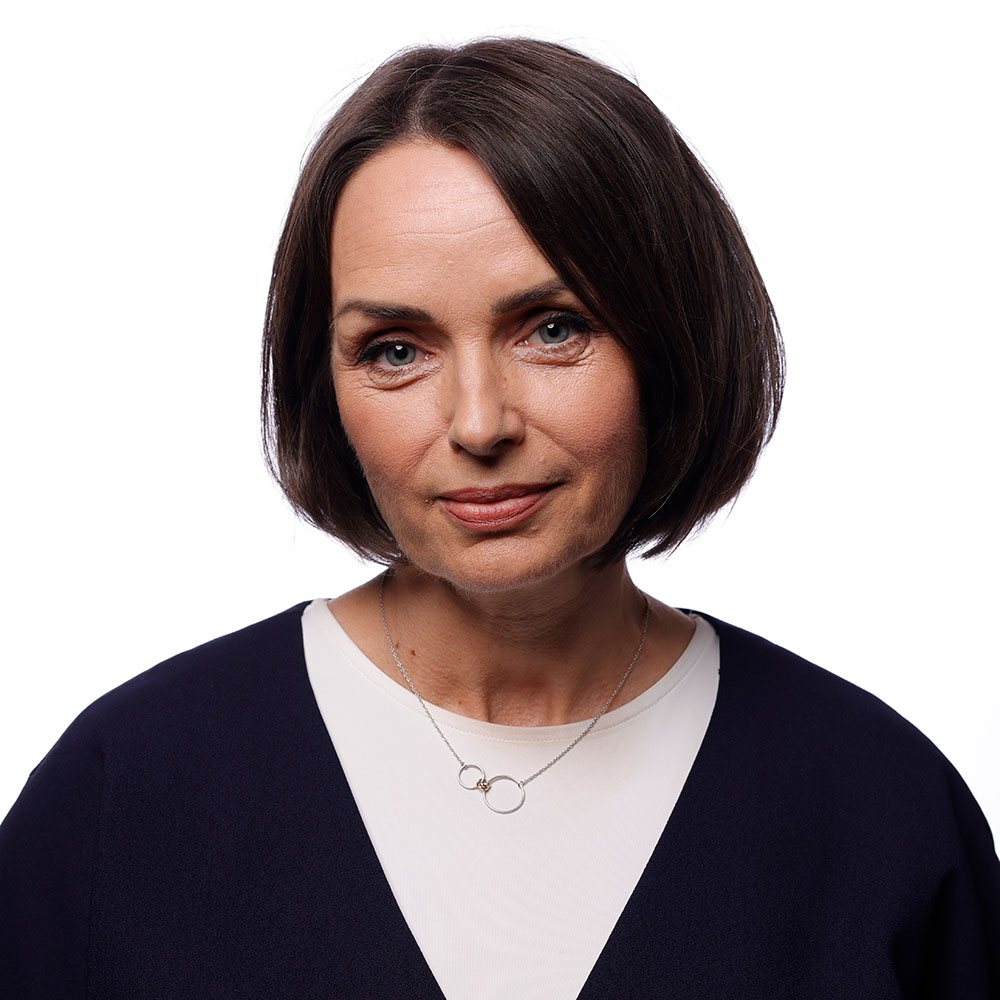
- Official portrait, 2026

Member of the Senedd for Gwynedd Maldwyn
- Incumbent
- Assumed office 8 May 2026
- Preceded by: Seat Established

Personal details
- Party: Plaid Cymru
- Children: Leisa Gwenllian

Beca Brown is a Welsh politician from Plaid Cymru who has been Member of the Senedd for Gwynedd Maldwyn since May 2026.

== Biography ==
Brown was born in Brecon, and raised in Dyffryn Ardudwy and the Caernarfon area. Before entering politics, Brown was an author, columnist, and television producer. She has two children, and lives in Llanrug.

Brown was elected a member of Gwynedd Council in 2021, representing the Llanrug ward, and re-elected in 2022. She was cabinet member for education between 2022 and 2024.

In the 2026 Senedd election, she was elected as the third candidate in Gwynedd Maldwyn behind Siân Gwenllian and Mabon ap Gwynfor.
