= Steve Witherden =

British politician

Steve Witherden MP
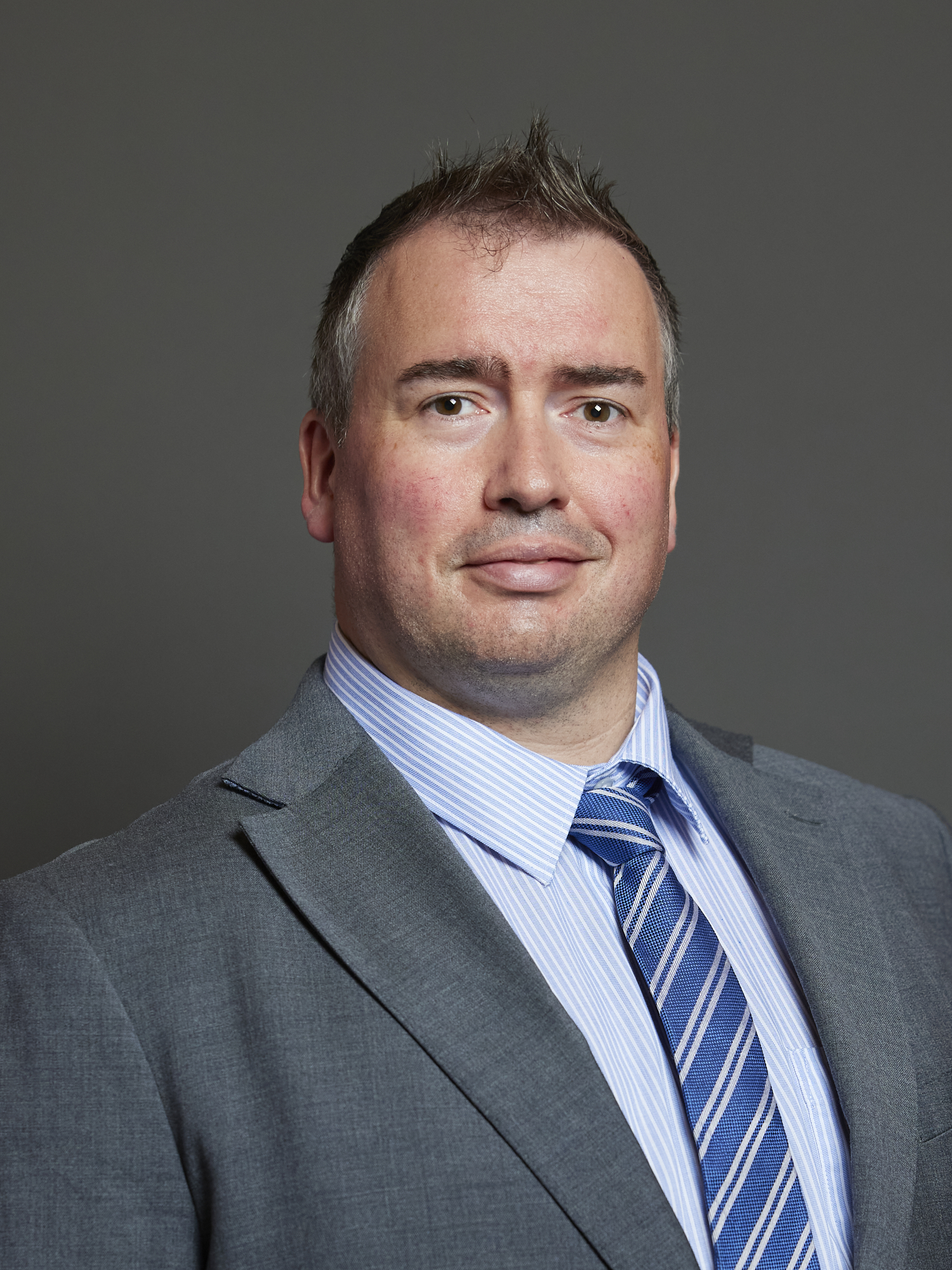
- Official portrait, 2024

Member of Parliament for Montgomeryshire and Glyndŵr
- Incumbent
- Assumed office 4 July 2024
- Preceded by: Craig Williams
- Majority: 3,815 (8.8%)

Personal details
- Born: Wrexham, Wales
- Party: Labour
- Education: University of Wales, Lampeter; University of Wales, Aberystwyth (PGCE)
- Occupation: Politician; teacher; trade unionist

Steve Witherden is a Welsh Labour Party politician who has served as Member of Parliament for Montgomeryshire and Glyndŵr since 2024.

Ideologically on the left, he is a member of the Socialist Campaign Group. Witherden has focused his parliamentary career on such issues as the cost-of-living crisis, climate change, local constituency matters such as cross-border health and education, and the ongoing Gaza war. Witherden as a backbencher was at times an outspoken critic of Keir Starmer. Witherden backed Andy Burnham and now serves as a Parliamentary private secretary to the Secretary of State for Energy Security and Net Zero.

== Early life and career ==
His father was a founding member of the Centre for Alternative Technology in Machynlleth, Powys. Witherden describes on his Facebook page how in the 1970s his dad brought the family with him to Machynlleth and "a few years later I came along".

He was born in Wrexham, Wales. He earned a degree in English Literature from the University of Wales, Lampeter, and a Postgraduate Certificate in Education from the University of Wales, Aberystwyth.

Witherden worked as a teacher in his constituency for 18 years. He also served as a trade union representative from 2009 and as a county officer from 2015.

Witherden is dyslexic and dyscalculic, and was illiterate until the age of 11. These experiences led him to become a teacher.

== Political career ==
Witherden won the Montgomeryshire and Glyndŵr seat with a majority of 3,815 votes. The former Montgomeryshire MP, Craig Williams, finished third. In his victory speech, Witherden stated that "Montgomeryshire is the only seat in Wales that had never had a Labour MP so history has been made here tonight".

In his maiden speech, Witherden cited the creation of Great British Energy and the elimination of zero-hour contracts as his priorities.

He sits on the Welsh Affairs Select Committee in Parliament.

Witherden opposed the government's proposed changes to Agricultural Property Relief. The proposes changes led to the 2024–2026 United Kingdom farmers' protests. In January 2025 he spoke emotionally in a Westminster Hall debate saying "when you sit with an elderly farmer and his wife, and both are fighting back tears, and they tell you 'if only I could die now, if only there were some sort of pill I could take now, so that my children won't have to worry about this' it does have a profound effect on you".

Witherden is a member of the Labour Rural Research Group, a body of Labour MPs representing agricultural constituencies.

Witherden opposed the government's proposed welfare benefits reforms.

In April 2026, Witherden was accused of plagiarising a constituent's letter of appeal, and idea, presented to him in February 2026, to have unused ventilators stored in the UK sent to Ukraine. A letter from Witherden, dated 3 days later, made the same appeal on behalf of the All-Party Parliamentary Group (APPG) on Cuba, in which he made similar points to his constituent's original letter of appeal.

In the summer of 2026 Witherden featured in the Michael Sheen documentary Buried where it was revealed that within Witherden's constituency of Montgomeryshire and Glyndŵr there was a high level of forever chemicals from years of industrial waste.

Witherden in the summer of 2026 was made a Parliamentary private secretary to the Secretary of State for Energy Security and Net Zero in the new Premiership of Andy Burnham He is the Chair of the APPG for Education and Parliamentary Convenor of the Socialist Education Association.

== Personal life ==
Witherden and his wife, Katie have two children, a son and a daughter. Katie is a community councillor in Cefn and also works in the NHS.

Parliament of the United Kingdom
New constituency	Member of Parliament for Montgomeryshire and Glyndŵr; 2024–present	Incumbent
