= Liz Saville Roberts =

Welsh politician (born 1964)

The Right Honourable Liz Saville Roberts MP
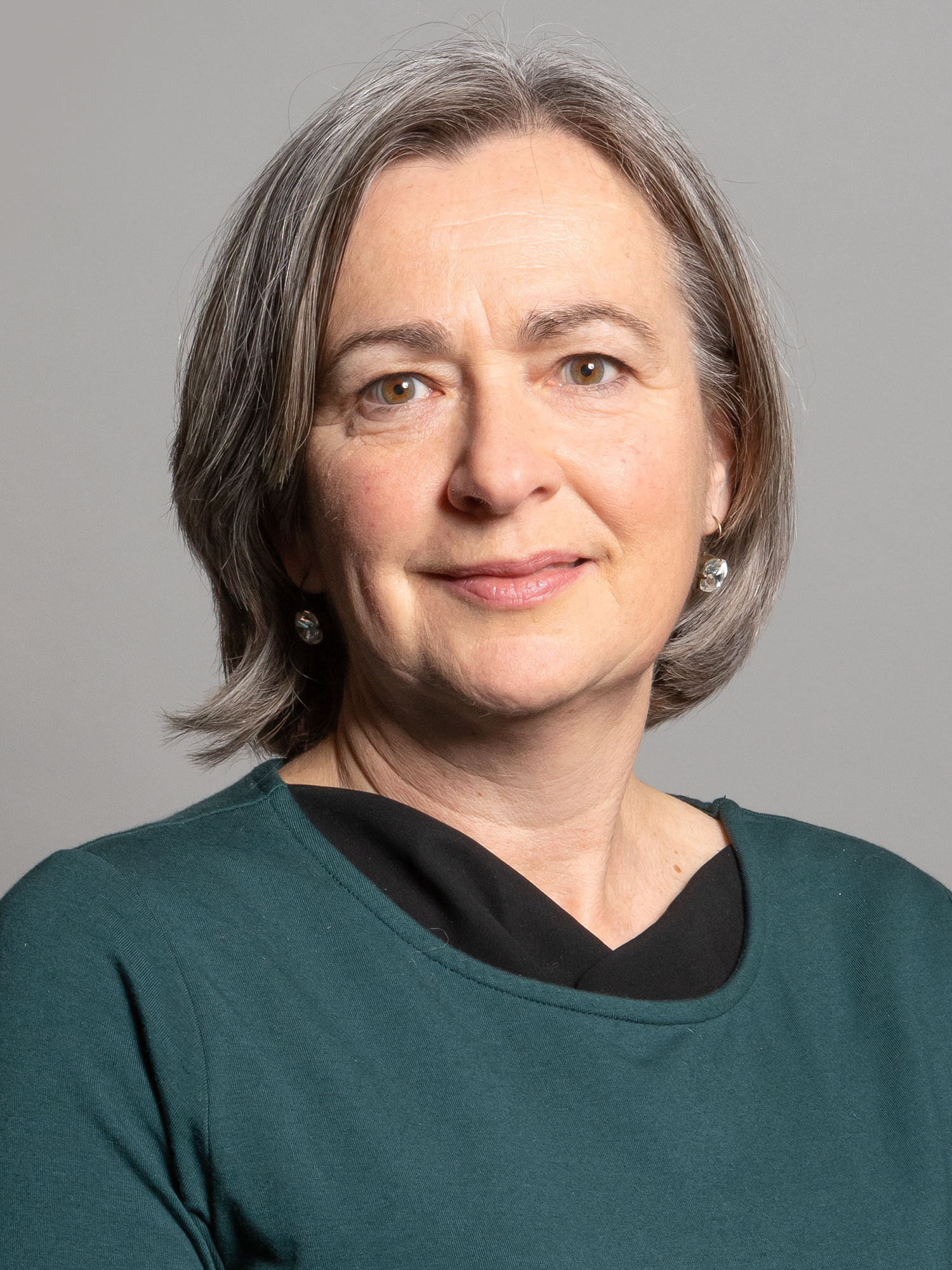
- Official portrait, 2020

Leader of Plaid Cymru in the House of Commons
- Incumbent
- Assumed office 14 June 2017
- Leader: Leanne Wood; Adam Price; Llyr Gruffydd (acting); Rhun ap Iorwerth
- Preceded by: Hywel Williams

Member of Parliament for Dwyfor Meirionnydd
- Incumbent
- Assumed office 7 May 2015
- Preceded by: Elfyn Llwyd
- Majority: 15,876 (39.3%)

Plaid Cymru Spokesperson for Home Affairs, Justice, Business and Equality
- Incumbent
- Assumed office 14 June 2017
- Leader: Leanne Wood; Adam Price
- Preceded by: Various

Plaid Cymru Spokesperson for Environment, Education, Health, Climate Change and Local Government
- In office 8 May 2015 – 3 May 2017
- Leader: Ieuan Wyn Jones; Leanne Wood
- Preceded by: Various
- Succeeded by: Various

Gwynedd County Councillor
- In office 4 May 2004 – 7 May 2015
- Succeeded by: Sian Wyn Hughes
- Constituency: Morfa Nefyn

Personal details
- Born: Elizabeth Saville; 16 December 1964 (age 61) Eltham, London, England
- Party: Plaid Cymru
- Spouse: Dewi Wyn Roberts (m. 1994)
- Children: 2
- Relatives: Jenny Saville (cousin)
- Education: Aberystwyth University

Elizabeth Saville Roberts PC (née Saville; born 16 December 1964) is a Welsh Plaid Cymru politician who has been the Member of Parliament (MP) for Dwyfor Meirionnydd since 2015. She has served as the group leader of Plaid Cymru in the House of Commons since 2017.

== Early life and career ==
Elizabeth Saville was born on 16 December 1964 in Eltham, before moving to Aberystwyth at the age of 18 to study languages at Aberystwyth University. She worked in Welsh-medium further education.

In 2004, she became a member of Gwynedd Council for Morfa Nefyn. In 2008, she became the authority's cabinet member for education.

== Parliamentary career ==
At the 2015 United Kingdom general election, Saville Roberts was elected to Parliament as MP for Dwyfor Meirionnydd with 40.9% of the vote and a majority of 5,261. She stood down as a councillor following the result, becoming Plaid's spokesperson for Home Affairs, Education, Health, Environment, Energy, Equalities and Local Government. In her maiden speech to Parliament, she emphasised her and Plaid Cymru's commitment to public education, and highlighted issues facing rural Wales.

In March 2016, Saville Roberts introduced a bill to the House of Commons which tackled online bullying and cyber crime.

In February 2017, Saville Roberts argued in favour of introducing a US-style rape shield law to prevent cross-examination of rape victims' sexual history in courtrooms, and tabled a private members bill on the matter. The government launched an emergency review in response.

At the snap 2017 general election, Saville Roberts was re-elected as MP for Dwyfor Meirionnydd with an increased vote share of 45.1% and a decreased majority of 4,850. Following the election, she became the leader of Plaid's Westminster group and party spokesperson for Home Affairs, Justice, Business, Energy, Industrial Strategy, Women and Equalities.

In November 2017, she led calls for a system of electronic tagging to be implemented for domestic abusers and stalkers which would allow their victims to be alerted if they were near by.

In April 2018, Saville Roberts opposed UK involvement in the 2018 bombing of Damascus and Homs, which she described as a "tokenistic action" that would do "little to allay the human suffering on the ground in Syria nor to bring stability to the region." She also criticised Prime Minister Theresa May for not having given Parliament a vote on the air strikes before proceeding. In October 2018 she spoke in Irish in the House of Commons as she called on Northern Ireland Secretary of State Karen Bradley to implement an Irish Language Act. She is believed to be the first person to speak Irish in the House of Commons since February 1901.

On 7 March 2019, Saville Roberts was sworn in as a member of the Privy Council of the United Kingdom. She is a member of the Joint Committee on the Draft Domestic Abuse Bill.

On 14 March 2019, Saville Roberts voted for an amendment tabled by members of The Independent Group for a second public vote on EU membership.

At the 2019 general election, Saville Roberts was again re-elected with an increased vote share of 48.3% and a decreased majority of 4,740.

On 17 March 2021, Saville Roberts again spoke in Irish, this time to wish Irish people a happy Saint Patrick's Day. She also gave the message in Welsh, for which the Speaker Lindsay Hoyle told her off and stated that speaking Welsh was against parliamentary rules. Saville Roberts claimed afterwards that the incident displayed "Westminster's disdain for minority languages". Leader of the House, Jacob Rees-Mogg later referenced the incident and called Welsh "a foreign language". In response, Saville Roberts tweeted: "Jacob Rees-Mogg may not be aware, but Welsh is not a 'foreign language'. It had been spoken in Britain for hundreds of years before English even existed."

She has called for an independent Wales to rejoin the European Union and the European single market.

At the 2024 general election, Saville Roberts was again re-elected, with an increased vote share of 53.9% and an increased majority of 15,876.

Saville Roberts supported Kim Leadbeater's bill introducing assisted suicide into law and served on the committee examining the legislation.

== Personal life ==
Saville Roberts has lived in the village of Morfa Nefyn in Gwynedd with her husband, Dewi Wyn Roberts, since 1993. They married in 1994 and have twin daughters. Her mother, Nancy Saville, was a scientist who was diagnosed with dementia in 2021. Saville Roberts has written openly about it, and the impact of COVID-19 lockdowns on people with the condition.

She is a cousin of the contemporary British artist Jenny Saville.

Parliament of the United Kingdom
Preceded by Elfyn Llwyd	Member of Parliament for Dwyfor Meirionnydd; 2015–present	Incumbent
