= Meirionnydd Nant Conwy (UK Parliament constituency) =

UK Parliament constituency (1983–2010)

Coordinates: 52.841°N 3.605°W

- Former county constituency for the House of Commons
- Boundary of Meirionnydd Nant Conwy in Wales for the 2005 general election
- Preserved county: Clwyd, Gwynedd
- Major settlements: Blaenau Ffestiniog, Dolgellau, Llanrwst

1983–2010
- Seats: One
- Created from: Merioneth, Conway and Denbigh
- Replaced by: Aberconwy, Dwyfor Meirionnydd

Meirionnydd Nant Conwy was a constituency represented in the House of Commons of the Parliament of the United Kingdom. It elected one Member of Parliament (MP) by the first past the post system of election.

The Meirionnydd Nant Conwy Welsh Assembly constituency was created with the same boundaries in 1999.

== History ==
The constituency was created in 1983, largely replacing the ancient constituency of Merioneth, and was abolished in 2010. For the entire period of its existence, it was represented by Plaid Cymru, and was generally regarded as a safe seat. It had the lowest population of any constituency in England or Wales, and also had the second highest proportion of Welsh-speaking voters.

== Boundaries ==
Meirionnydd Nant Conwy consisted of Merionethshire and part of the Conwy valley. This was a mainly rural area containing small towns and villages such as Dolgellau, Blaenau Ffestiniog, Bala, Betws-y-Coed, and Llanrwst.

=== Boundary review ===
Following its review of parliamentary representation in Wales, the Boundary Commission for Wales abolished this constituency. It was replaced mostly by Dwyfor Meirionnydd and in part by Aberconwy. These new constituencies were first fought at the 2010 general election.

== Members of Parliament ==
From 1983 to 1992 the constituency was represented by Dafydd Elis Thomas of Plaid Cymru, who represented Dwyfor Meirionnydd in the Welsh Senedd and is its former Presiding Officer. The constituency was represented at its abolition by Elfyn Llwyd, also of Plaid Cymru.

Election	Member	Party
1983	Dafydd Elis Thomas	Plaid Cymru
1992	Elfyn Llwyd	Plaid Cymru
2010	constituency abolished: see Aberconwy and Dwyfor Meirionnydd	

== Elections ==
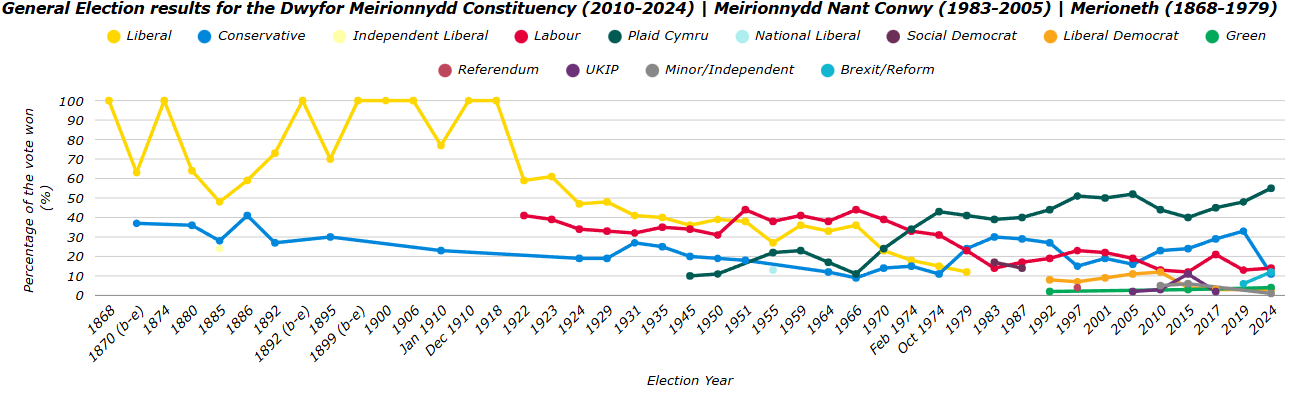
Graph to show the election results of the Meirionnydd Nant Conwy UK constituency and its predecessor/successor seat. (1868–2024)

=== Elections in the 1980s ===
General election 1983: Meirionnydd Nant Conwy
Party	Candidate	Votes	%	±%
Plaid Cymru	Dafydd Elis-Thomas	9,709	39.2	
Conservative	David Lloyd	7,066	28.5	
SDP	David Roberts	4,254	17.2	
Labour	Glyn Williams	3,735	15.1	
Majority		2,643	10.7	
Turnout		24,764	81.3	
Plaid Cymru win (new seat)				

General election 1987: Meirionnydd Nant Conwy
Party	Candidate	Votes	%	±%
Plaid Cymru	Dafydd Elis-Thomas	10,392	40.0	+0.8
Conservative	Dennis Jones	7,366	28.4	−0.1
Labour	Hugh Roberts	4,397	16.9	+1.8
SDP	David Roberts	3,814	14.7	−2.5
Majority		3,026	11.7	+1.0
Turnout		25,969	80.6	−0.7
Plaid Cymru hold		Swing	+0.5	

=== Elections in the 1990s ===
General election 1992: Meirionnydd Nant Conwy
Party	Candidate	Votes	%	±%
Plaid Cymru	Elfyn Llwyd	11,608	44.0	+4.0
Conservative	Gwyn Lewis	6,995	26.5	−1.9
Labour	Rhys Williams	4,978	18.8	+1.9
Liberal Democrats	Ruth Parry	2,358	8.9	−5.8
Green	William Pritchard	471	1.8	New
Majority		4,613	17.5	+5.8
Turnout		26,410	81.5	+0.9
Plaid Cymru hold		Swing	+2.9	

General election 1997: Meirionnydd Nant Conwy
Party	Candidate	Votes	%	±%
Plaid Cymru	Elfyn Llwyd	12,465	50.7	+6.7
Labour	Hefin E. Rees	5,660	23.0	+4.2
Conservative	Jeremy Quin	3,922	16.0	−10.5
Liberal Democrats	Robina L. Feeley	1,719	7.0	−1.9
Referendum	Phillip H. Hodge	809	3.3	New
Majority		6,805	27.7	+10.2
Turnout		24,575	76.0	−5.5
Plaid Cymru hold		Swing		

=== Elections in the 2000s ===
General election 2001: Meirionnydd Nant Conwy
Party	Candidate	Votes	%	±%
Plaid Cymru	Elfyn Llwyd	10,459	49.6	−1.1
Labour	Denise Idris Jones	4,775	22.7	−0.3
Conservative	Lisa Francis	3,962	18.8	+2.8
Liberal Democrats	Dafydd Raw-Rees	1,872	8.9	+1.9
Majority		5,684	26.9	−0.8
Turnout		21,068	63.9	−12.1
Plaid Cymru hold		Swing		

General election 2005: Meirionnydd Nant Conwy
Party	Candidate	Votes	%	±%
Plaid Cymru	Elfyn Llwyd	10,597	51.3	+1.7
Labour	Rhodri Jones	3,983	19.3	−3.4
Conservative	Dan Munford	3,402	16.5	−2.3
Liberal Democrats	Adrian Fawcett	2,192	10.6	+1.7
UKIP	Francis Wykes	466	2.3	New
Majority		6,614	32.0	+5.1
Turnout		20,640	61.7	−2.2
Plaid Cymru hold		Swing	+2.6	

== See also ==
- List of parliamentary constituencies in Clwyd
- List of parliamentary constituencies in Gwynedd
