= Dwyfor Meirionnydd (UK Parliament constituency) =

UK Parliament constituency (since 2010)

- County constituency for the House of Commons
- Interactive map of boundaries from 2024
- Location within Wales
- Preserved county: Gwynedd
- Electorate: 72,533 (March 2020)
- Major settlements: Caernarfon, Pwllheli, Blaenau Ffestiniog, Porthmadog, Dolgellau, Bala

Current constituency
- Created: 2010
- Member of Parliament: Liz Saville Roberts (Plaid Cymru)
- Seats: One
- Created from: Caernarfon and Meirionnydd Nant Conwy

Overlaps
- Senedd: Gwynedd Maldwyn

Dwyfor Meirionnydd is a constituency of the House of Commons of the Parliament of the United Kingdom (at Westminster), represented since 2015 by Liz Saville Roberts of Plaid Cymru.

Like its predecessors, it is a Plaid Cymru stronghold, with their candidate in 2024 achieving a majority of 39.3%.

Until 2024, the seat shared the same boundaries with the Dwyfor Meirionnydd Senedd constituency, the latter of which still uses the borders established for the 2007 Welsh Assembly election.

== History ==
Dwyfor Meirionnydd was created by the Welsh Boundary Commission for the 2010 general election, and replaced the old north Wales seat of Meirionnydd Nant Conwy.

At the 2023 Periodic Review of Westminster constituencies and under the June 2023 final recommendations of the Boundary Commission for Wales, the constituency retained its name and gained wards in boundary changes first used for the 2024 United Kingdom general election.

== Boundaries ==
The constituency was created by merging most of Meirionnydd Nant Conwy with the southern part of Caernarfon; the northern area became part of a new Arfon constituency.

Map of boundaries 2010–2024

2010–2024: The County of Gwynedd wards of: Aberdaron, Aberdyfi, Abererch, Abermaw, Abersoch, Bala, Botwnnog, Bowydd and Rhiw, Brithdir and Llanfachreth/Ganllwyd/Llanelltyd, Bryn-crug/Llanfihangel, Clynnog, Corris/Mawddwy, Criccieth, Diffwys and Maenofferen, Dolbenmaen, Dolgellau North, Dolgellau South, Dyffryn Ardudwy, Efail-newydd/Buan, Harlech, Llanaelhaearn, Llanbedr, Llanbedrog, Llandderfel, Llanengan, Llangelynin, Llanuwchllyn, Llanystumdwy, Morfa Nefyn, Nefyn, Penrhyndeudraeth, Porthmadog East, Porthmadog West, Porthmadog-Tremadog, Pwllheli North, Pwllheli South, Teigl, Trawsfynydd, Tudweiliog and Tywyn.

2024–present: Under the 2023 review, drawn up in accordance with the ward structure in existence on 1 December 2020, the constituency was defined as comprising the wards above, plus the Gwynedd wards of Bethel, Bontnewydd, CadnantCwm-y-Glo, Deiniolen, Groeslon, Llanberis, Llanllyfni, Llanrug, Llanwnda, Menai (Caernarfon), Peblig (Caernarfon), Penisarwaun, Pentir, Penygroes, Seiont, Talysarn, Waunfawr, and Y Felinheli; and the County of Denbighshire wards of Corwen and Llandrillo.

The areas in Gwynedd were transferred in from the abolished Arfon constituency, and the areas in Denbighshire from the abolished Clwyd South constituency.

Following local government boundary reviews which came into effect in May 2022, the constituency now comprises the following from the 2024 general election:

- The County of Gwynedd wards of: Aberdyfi; Abererch; Abermaw; Abersoch gyda Llanengan; Arthog a Llangelynnin; Bethel a’r Felinheli; Bowydd a’r Rhiw; Brithdir and Llanfachreth/Ganllwyd/Llanelltyd; Bro Dysynni; Cadnant; Canol Tref Caernarfon; Clynnog; Corris a Mawddwy; Criccieth; Cwm-y-glo; De Dolgellau; De Pwllheli; Deiniolen; Diffwys a Maenofferen; Dolbenmaen; Dwyrain Porthmadog; Dyffryn Ardudwy; Efailnewydd a Buan; Glaslyn; Gogledd Dolgellau; Gogledd Pwllheli; Gorllewin Porthmadog; Gorllewin Tywyn; Harlech a Llanbedr; Hendre; Llanbedrog gyda Mynytho; Llanberis; Llandderfel; Llanllyfni; Llanrug; Llanuwchllyn; Llanwnda; Llanystumdwy; Menai; Morfa Nefyn a Thudweiliog; Morfa Tywyn; Nefyn; Peblig; Pen draw Llŷn; Penisa’r-waun; Penrhyndeudraeth; Pen-y-groes; Teigl; Trawsfynydd; Tryfan; Waunfawr; Y Bala; Y Bontnewydd; Y Groeslon; Yr Eifl.
- The County of Denbighshire ward of Edeirnion.

The seat is bordered to the north by Bangor Aberconwy, to the south by Montgomeryshire and Glyndŵr, and to the east by Clwyd East.

== Members of Parliament ==
Election	Member	Party	Notes
2010	Elfyn Llwyd	Plaid Cymru	Plaid Cymru's Westminster parliamentary group leader until 2015
2015	Liz Saville Roberts	Plaid Cymru	Plaid Cymru's Westminster parliamentary group leader from 2017

== Elections ==
=== Election Graph ===
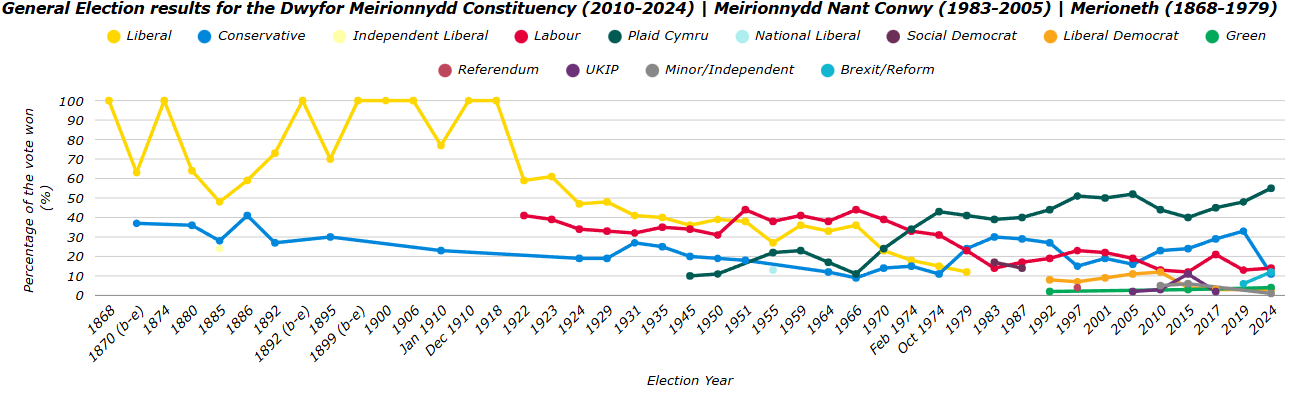
Graph to show the election results of the Dwyfor Meirionnydd UK constituency and its predecessor seats. (1868–2024)

=== Elections held in the 2010s ===
General election 2010: Dwyfor Meirionnydd
Party	Candidate	Votes	%	±%
Plaid Cymru	Elfyn Llwyd	12,814	44.3	
Conservative	Simon Baynes	6,447	22.3	
Labour	Alwyn Humphreys	4,021	13.9	
Liberal Democrats	Stephen Churchman	3,538	12.2	
Independent	Louise Hughes	1,310	4.5	
UKIP	Frank Wykes	776	2.7	
Majority		6,367	22.0	
Turnout		28,906	63.7	
Registered electors		45,354		
Plaid Cymru win (new seat)				

General election 2015: Dwyfor Meirionnydd
Party	Candidate	Votes	%	±%
Plaid Cymru	Liz Saville Roberts	11,811	40.9	−3.4
Conservative	Neil Fairlamb	6,550	22.7	+0.4
Labour	Mary Clarke	3,904	13.5	−0.4
UKIP	Christopher Gillibrand	3,126	10.8	+8.1
Independent	Louise Hughes	1,388	4.8	+0.3
Liberal Democrats	Stephen Churchman	1,153	4.0	−8.2
Green	Marc Fothergill	981	3.4	N/A
Majority		5,261	18.2	−3.8
Turnout		28,913	65.1	+1.4
Registered electors		44,394		
Plaid Cymru hold		Swing	−1.9	

General election 2017: Dwyfor Meirionnydd
Party	Candidate	Votes	%	±%
Plaid Cymru	Liz Saville Roberts	13,687	45.1	+4.2
Conservative	Neil Fairlamb	8,837	29.1	+6.4
Labour	Mathew Norman	6,273	20.7	+7.2
Liberal Democrats	Stephen Churchman	937	3.1	−0.9
UKIP	Frank Wykes	614	2.0	−8.8
Majority		4,850	16.0	−2.2
Turnout		30,312	68.0	+2.9
Registered electors		44,699		
Plaid Cymru hold		Swing	−1.1	

General election 2019: Dwyfor Meirionnydd
Party	Candidate	Votes	%	±%
Plaid Cymru	Liz Saville Roberts	14,447	48.3	+3.2
Conservative	Tomos Davies	9,707	32.4	+3.3
Labour	Graham Hogg	3,998	13.4	−7.3
Brexit Party	Louise Hughes	1,776	5.9	N/A
Majority		4,740	15.9	−0.1
Turnout		29,928	67.5	−0.5
Registered electors		44,362		
Plaid Cymru hold		Swing	−0.1	

2019 notional result (Note: Estimate of the 2019 general election result as if the revised boundaries recommended under the 2023 boundary review were in place)
Party	Vote	%
Plaid Cymru	23,110	45.7
Conservative	13,230	26.2
Labour	11,541	22.8
Brexit Party	2,558	5.1
Liberal Democrats	79	0.2
Majority	9,880	19.6
Turnout	50,518	69.6
Electorate	72,533	

=== Elections held in the 2020s ===
General election 2024: Dwyfor Meirionnydd
Party	Candidate	Votes	%	±%
Plaid Cymru	Liz Saville Roberts	21,788	53.9	+8.2
Labour	Joanna Stallard	5,912	14.6	−8.2
Reform	Lucy Murphy	4,857	12.0	+6.9
Conservative	Tomos Day	4,712	11.7	−14.5
Green	Karl Drinkwater	1,448	3.6	+3.6
Liberal Democrats	Phoebe Jenkins	1,381	3.4	+3.2
Heritage	Joan Ginsberg	297	0.7	+0.7
Majority		15,876	39.3	+19.7
Turnout		40,395	55.3	−14.3
Registered electors		73,042		
Plaid Cymru hold		Swing	+8.2	

== See also ==
- Dwyfor Meirionnydd (Senedd constituency)
- List of parliamentary constituencies in Gwynedd
- List of parliamentary constituencies in Wales
