= Gwynedd Maldwyn =

Senedd constituency (from 2026)

- County multi-member constituency for the Senedd
- Boundary of Gwynedd Maldwyn in Wales
- Principal areas: Denbighshire; Gwynedd; Powys; Wrexham County Borough
- Preserved county: Clwyd; Gwynedd; Powys
- Population: 195,838 (2024)
- Major settlements: Bala, Caernarfon, Chirk, Machynlleth, Newtown, Porthmadog, Ruabon, Welshpool

Current County multi-member constituency
- Created: 2026
- Seats: 6
- Created from: UK Parliament boundaries: Dwyfor Meirionnydd; Montgomeryshire and Glyndŵr; Previous Senedd constituencies: Arfon; Clwyd South; Dwyfor Meirionnydd; Montgomeryshire; Previous Senedd region: Mid and West Wales; North Wales

Gwynedd Maldwyn (Welsh for 'Gwynedd [and] Montgomeryshire';) is a six-member constituency of the Senedd (Welsh Parliament; Welsh: Senedd Cymru) used in the 2026 Senedd election. It is located in North and Mid Wales, and covers western and southern Gwynedd, southern Denbighshire, northern Powys, and the south-west of Wrexham County Borough.

It was proposed following the 2026 review of Senedd constituencies, and is a pairing of the two UK Parliament constituencies Dwyfor Meirionnydd and Montgomeryshire and Glyndŵr. It has a Welsh-only name.

== Boundaries ==
The constituency includes Gwynedd with the exception of the area around Bangor and Bethesda in the north; the area around Corwen in southern Denbighshire; northern Powys, including Llanidloes and Newtown; and the south-west of Wrexham County Borough including Rhostyllen.

A Senedd constituency comprising the boundaries of the UK Parliament constituencies of Dwyfor Meirionnydd and Montgomeryshire and Glyndŵr, has been proposed by the Democracy and Boundary Commission Cymru for the 2026 election to the Senedd (Welsh Parliament; Senedd Cymru). It was initially proposed using the name Dwyfor Meirionnydd, Montgomeryshire and Glyndŵr in September 2024, but was renamed to Gwynedd Maldwyn in December proposals with most constituencies using Welsh-only names. The Welsh-only name and boundaries were confirmed in the commission's final recommendations in March 2025. When announcing their candidates, Reform UK used "Dwyfor Meirionnydd, Montgomeryshire and Glyndŵr" instead, using the English names for the pair of UK Parliament constituencies that form it.

The constituency was established in 2026, following the passing of the Senedd Cymru (Members and Elections) Act 2024. The act legislates electoral reform of the Senedd to create 16 larger "super constituencies", pairing the 32 UK Parliament constituencies in Wales, and using a new fully proportional voting system, with each constituency electing six Members of the Senedd (MSs) rather than one previously.

== Members of the Senedd ==
Term	Election	Distribution	MS	MS	MS	MS	MS	MS
7th	2026	4 / 2	Siân Gwenllian (PC)	Andrew Griffin (Ref)	Mabon ap Gwynfor (PC)	Beca Brown (PC)	Claire Johnson-Wood (Ref)	Elwyn Vaughan (PC)

== Elections ==
=== Elections in the 2020s ===
2026 Senedd election: Gwynedd Maldwyn
Party	Candidate	Votes	%	±%
Plaid Cymru	Siân Gwenllian (E) Mabon ap Gwynfor (E) Beca Brown (E) Elwyn Vaughan (E) Elin Hywel Donna O'Brien Victoria Evans Elfed ap Elwyn	36,087	44.2	+10.6
Reform	Andrew Griffin (E) Claire Johnson-Wood (E) Karl Lewis Phillip Robinson Mark Blake Richard Pendry	22,667	27.7	+26.7
Conservative	Aled Davies Henrietta Hensher Peter Lewington Hedd Thomas Daniel Spilsbury Roger Cracknell	5,650	6.9	−18.0
Liberal Democrats	Glyn Preston Steve Churchman Richard Church Pete Roberts Carol Robinson Chris Lloyd	4,554	5.6	−0.6
Labour	Ian Parry Dawn McGuinness Steffan Chambers Dana Davies Mathew Norman Morgan Peters	4,466	5.5	−16.7
Green	Nathan Jarvis Nicole Wait Sue MacFarlane Sian Thomas Curtis Wilford Ed Mason	4,090	5.0	+0.9
Independent	Russell George	2,862	3.5	New
Gwlad	Jeremy Davies	767	0.9	+0.3
Independent	Monty Kennard	307	0.4	New
Heritage	Mattie Ginsberg	240	0.3	New
Majority		13,420	16.5	+10.0
Turnout		81,690	52.5	+2.2
Registered electors		155,719		
win (new seat)				

2021 notional result (Note: Estimate of the 2021 Senedd election result as if the revised boundaries recommended under the 2026 boundary review were in place)
Party	Vote	%	Seats
Plaid Cymru	26,224	35.3	3
Conservative	21,370	28.8	2
Labour	15,719	21.2	1
Liberal Democrats	5,880	7.9	0
Reform UK	1,609	2.2	0
Propel	1,314	1.8	0
Llais Gwynedd	1,136	1.5	0
Abolish	310	0.4	0
UKIP	271	0.4	0
Gwlad	157	0.2	0
Freedom Alliance	152	0.2	0
Independent	48	0.1	0
