= Andrew Griffin (politician) =

Welsh politician

Andrew Griffin MS
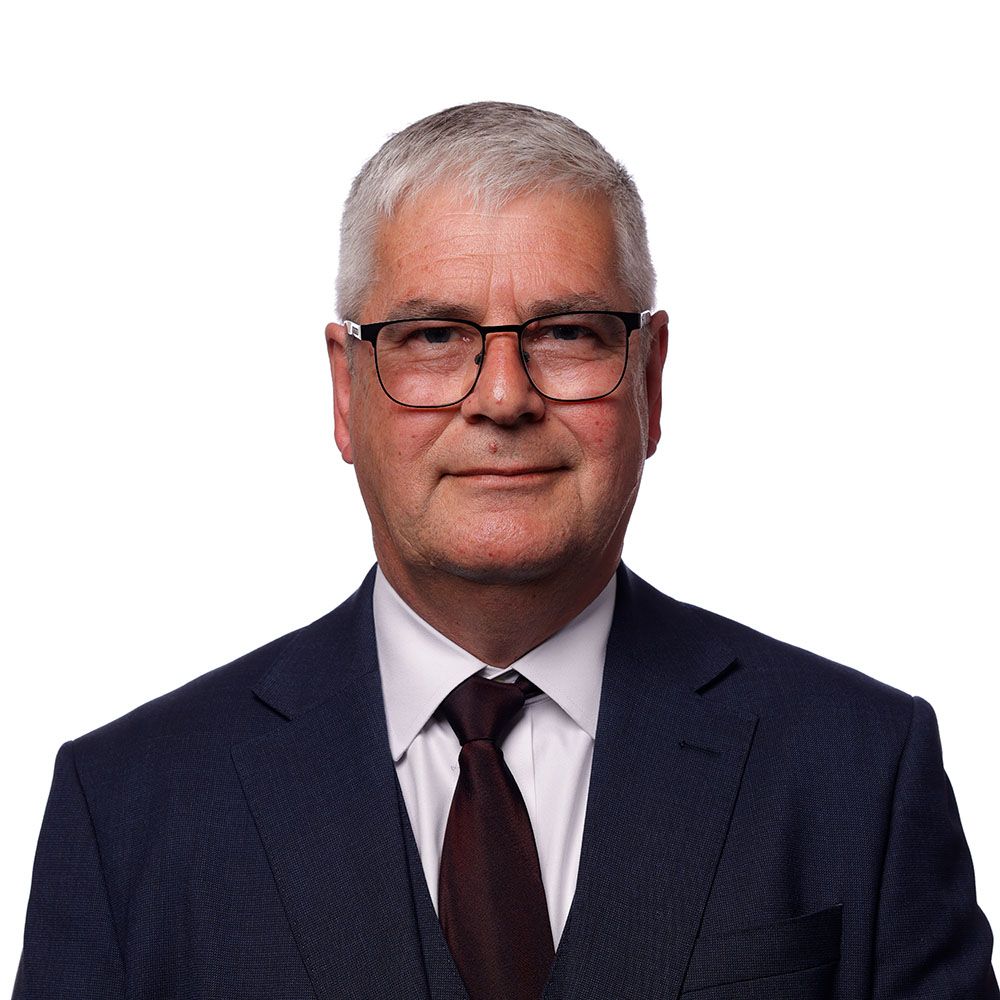
- Official portrait, 2026

Member of the Senedd for Gwynedd Maldwyn
- Incumbent
- Assumed office 8 May 2026
- Preceded by: Seat Established

Personal details
- Party: Reform UK

Andrew Charles Griffin is a Welsh politician for Reform UK Wales, who has served as Member of the Senedd for the Gwynedd Maldwyn constituency since May 2026. Griffin is a former Town Mayor of Llanfyllin. He has had a career in administration, operations and data management.

== See also ==
- 7th Senedd
