= Montgomeryshire and Glyndŵr =

UK Parliament constituency (since 2024)

- County constituency for the House of Commons
- Interactive map of the constituency.
- Location of the constituency within Wales
- Electorate: 74,223 (March 2020)
- Major settlements: Newtown, Welshpool, Llanidloes, Chirk, Cefn Mawr, Rhosllanerchrugog, Machynlleth, Montgomery

Current constituency
- Created: 2024
- Member of Parliament: Steve Witherden (Labour)
- Seats: One
- Created from: Montgomeryshire; Clwyd South

Overlaps
- Senedd: Gwynedd Maldwyn

Montgomeryshire and Glyndŵr (Welsh: Maldwyn a Glyndŵr) is a constituency of the House of Commons in the UK Parliament, first contested at the 2024 United Kingdom general election, following the 2023 review of Westminster constituencies.

The constituency name refers to the former county of Montgomeryshire and the former district of Glyndŵr. The official spelling of the constituency, in English and Welsh, uses the spelling 'Glyndŵr' with a circumflex over the "w".

Upon its abolition, the predecessor seat, Montgomeryshire, was the only one in Wales never to elect a member of the Labour Party. At the 2024 election Montgomeryshire and Glyndŵr elected Steve Witherden, the first Labour MP ever to represent the Montgomeryshire area in the House of Commons, meaning that the party has now won in every area of Wales at some point in its history.

== Boundaries ==
Under the 2023 review, the constituency was defined as being composed of the following, as they existed on 1 December 2020:

- The County of Powys wards of: Banwy, Berriew, Blaen Hafren, Caersws, Churchstoke, Dolforwyn, Forden, Glantwymyn, Guilsfield, Kerry, Llanbrynmair, Llandinam, Llandrinio, Llandysilio, Llanfair Caereinion, Llanfihangel, Llanfyllin, Llanidloes, Llanwddyn, Llanrhaeadr-ym-Mochnant/ Llansilin, Llansantffraid, Machynlleth, Meifod, Montgomery, Newtown Central, Newtown East, Newtown Llanllwchaiarn North, Newtown Llanllwchaiarn West, Newtown South, Rhiwcynon, Trewern, Welshpool Castle, Welshpool Gungrog, and Welshpool Llanerchyddol.
- The County Borough of Wrexham wards of: Cefn, Chirk North, Chirk South, Dyffryn Ceiriog/Ceiriog Valley, Esclusham, Johnstown, Pant, Penycae, Penycae and Ruabon South, Plas Madoc, Ponciau, and Ruabon.

Following local government boundary reviews which came into effect in May 2022, the constituency now comprises the following from the 2024 general election:

- The County of Powys wards of: Banwy, Llanfihangel and Llanwddyn; Berriew and Castle Caereinion; Caersws; Churchstoke; Dolforwyn; Forden and Montgomery; Glantwymyn; Guilsfield; Kerry; Llanbrynmair; Llandinam with Dolfor; Llandrinio; Llandysilio; Llanfair Caereinion and Llanerfyl; Llanfyllin; Llangyniew and Meifod; Llanidloes; Llanrhaeadr-ym-Mochnant and Llansilin; Llansantffraid; Machynlleth; Newtown Central and South; Newtown East; Newton North; Newtown West; Rhiwcynon; Trelystan and Trewern; Welshpool Castle; Welshpool Gungrog; and Welshpool Llanerchyddol.
- The County Borough of Wrexham wards of: Acrefair North; Cefn East; Cefn West; Chirk North; Chirk South; Dyffryn Ceiriog; Esclusham; Pant and Johnstown; Penycae; Penycae and Ruabon South; Ponciau; Rhos; and Ruabon.

The Powys wards comprised the former constituency of Montgomeryshire; the Wrexham wards were previously part of the abolished constituency of Clwyd South.

== Election results ==
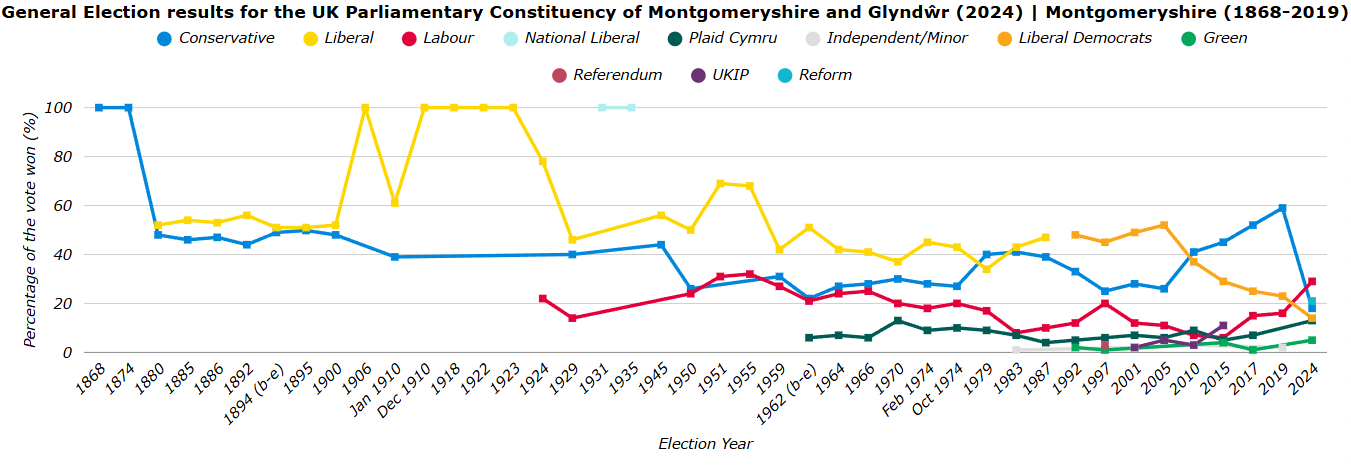
Graph to show the election results of the Montgomeryshire and Glyndŵr UK constituency and its predecessor seat Montgomeryshire. (1868–2024)

=== Elections in the 2020s ===
General Election 2024: Montgomeryshire and Glyndŵr
Party	Candidate	Votes	%	±%
Labour	Steve Witherden	12,709	29.4	+4.6
Reform	Oliver Lewis	8,894	20.6	+19.2
Conservative	Craig Williams (Note: Suspended after implication in the 2024 United Kingdom general election betting scandal)	7,775	18.0	−35.6
Liberal Democrats	Glyn Preston	6,470	15.0	−1.8
Plaid Cymru	Elwyn Vaughan	5,667	13.1	+11.1
Green	Jeremy Brignell-Thorp	1,744	4.0	N/A
Majority		3,815	8.8	N/A
Turnout		43,259	58.0	
Labour gain from Conservative		Swing		

On 25 June the Conservative Party withdrew support for their candidate due to the 2024 United Kingdom general election betting scandal. It was confirmed on behalf of the returning officer that his name and party designation had to remain on the ballot paper, as the suspension came after nominations for the election had closed. On 20 June a YouGov poll had predicted Montgomeryshire and Glyndŵr would be the only seat in Wales to be won by the Conservatives, by a narrow margin.

=== Elections in the 2010s ===
2019 notional result (Note: Estimate of the 2019 general election result as if the revised boundaries recommended under the 2023 boundary review were in place)
Party	Vote	%
Conservative	27,466	53.6
Labour	12,701	24.8
Liberal Democrats	8,595	16.8
Plaid Cymru	1,019	2.0
Gwlad Gwlad	727	1.4
Brexit Party	700	1.4
Majority	14,765	28.8
Turnout	51,208	69.0
Electorate	74,223	
