= Elwyn Vaughan =

Welsh politician

Elwyn Vaughan MS
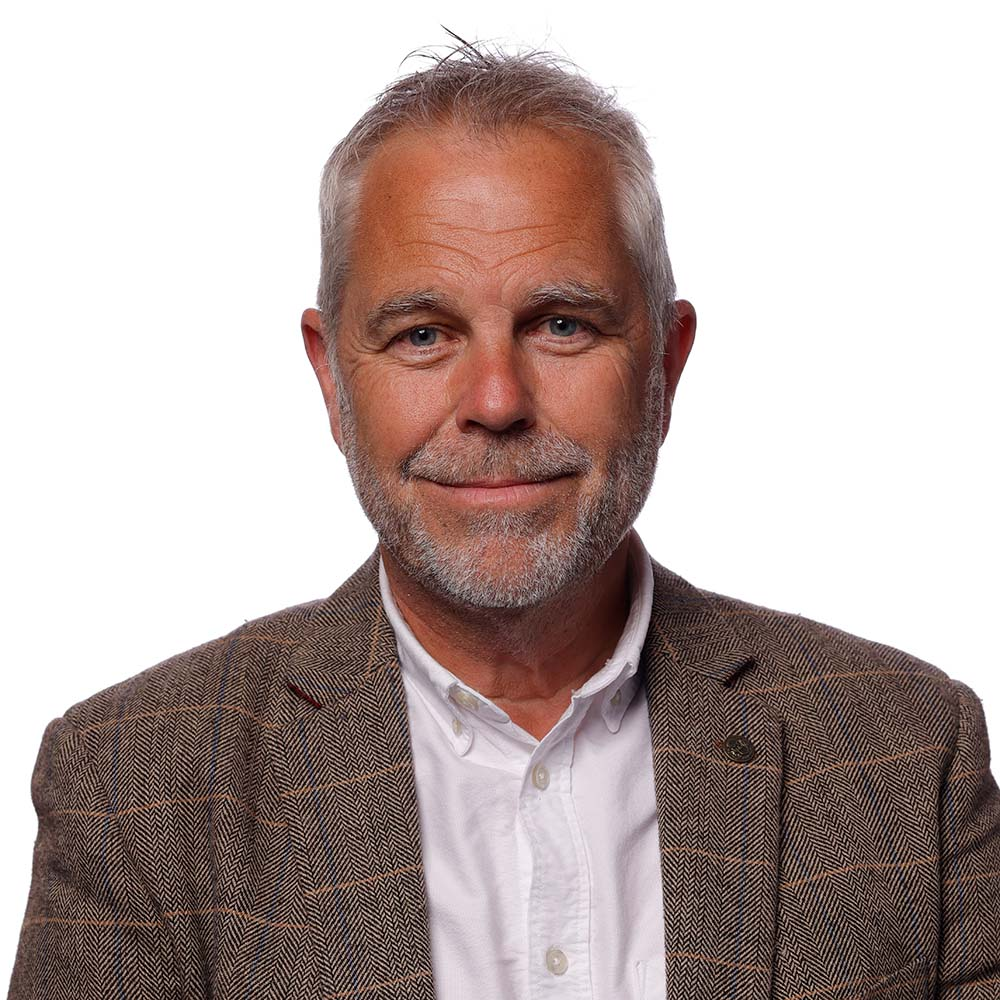
- Official portrait, 2026

Member of the Senedd for Gwynedd Maldwyn
- Incumbent
- Assumed office 8 May 2026
- Preceded by: Seat Established

Personal details
- Born: 20 December 1965 (age 60)
- Party: Plaid Cymru

Elwyn Graham Vaughan is a Welsh politician for Plaid Cymru, who has served as Member of the Senedd for the Gwynedd Maldwyn constituency since May 2026. He was previously a councillor for the Powys County Council.

== Early career ==
Vaughan founded the not-for-profit enterprise agency Cymad Cyf in 1995. Cymad, which was based in Gwynedd, was created to support the rural development of communities in Meirionydd and Dwyfor through the delivery of publicly funded, time limited projects with specific funding restrictions. At its peak, the organisation administered millions of pounds in European funding through the LEADER programme and delivered work training initiatives, employing up to 65 staff in Porthmadog and generating an annual turnover of around £2 million. In later years it employed around 30 full-time staff, many of them working at the Welsh language call centre Galw, with its main base at Parc Busnes, Porthmadog, and additional offices in Wrexham. In July 2008, Vaughan resigned from his role as Managing Director at Cymad to establish Bwyd Da, a business focused on food production and marketing.

In 2007, Vaughan was found guilty of two offences of false accounting relating to cheque stubs while he was managing director of Cymad, and was fined. The offences involved two cheques totalling £680. Vaughan stated that the payments were intended to cover overtime and outstanding holiday pay owed to a member of staff and denied any dishonest intent. However a Crown Court Judge found that he had behaved "unprofessionally, unethically" and "dishonestly". Vaughan subsequently resigned as director of Cymad. It emerged following his resignation that compensation and costs ordered by an employment tribunal to be paid by the agency to a whistleblower was outstanding. Cymad entered liquidation in 2009. The Wales Audit Office later concluded that, while there was no evidence that the agency deliberately misused public funds, Cymad did not adequately manage much of the £3.6 million of public funds it received and awarded.

== Local government career ==
Vaughan was first elected as a county councillor on Powys County Council, representing the Glantwymyn ward, in May 2017. He was re-elected in May 2022, and served as a councillor until his election to the Senedd in May 2026.

=== Committees and roles ===
During his time on Powys County Council, Vaughan served on a number of committees. These have included serving as a member of the Democratic Services Committee, the Planning, Taxi Licensing and Rights of Way Committee, the council's Finance Panel, and the Taxi Licensing Sub-Committee.

In the 2024–25 municipal year, Vaughan was listed in his councillor annual report as chair of the Democratic Services Committee. The committee has responsibility for matters relating to member support, standards of conduct, and democratic governance arrangements within the authority.

In addition to his internal council roles, Vaughan was appointed by Powys County Council to represent the authority on several outside bodies, including the Mid and West Wales Fire and Rescue Service, as well as governing bodies connected with local education provision.

=== Motions and council activity ===
As a councillor, Vaughan proposed and contributed to motions and scrutiny on a range of local and regional issues. These included matters affecting rural communities, council governance, financial oversight, and the relationship between local government in Wales and the UK Government.

In council meetings, Vaughan used formal scrutiny mechanisms, including the submission of questions to senior officers and cabinet members, particularly in relation to public spending, transparency, and service provision.

=== Welshpool air ambulance base ===
In October 2022, Vaughan brought a motion at Powys County Council supporting efforts to keep the Wales Air Ambulance base in Welshpool open. During the debate he said: “Our communities in Powys, and the lives of our residents are just as important as those of people living in urban parts of Wales,” and argued that the service should be “serving the most rural parts of Wales.” In 2025, regional media reported Vaughan as part of a cross-party group involved in legal challenge and appeal activity relating to the Welshpool base proposals.

=== Bethany Chapel (Hodley) ===
In September 2023, on behalf of local residents, Vaughan raised concerns about development works at Bethany Chapel in Hodley (near Kerry, Newtown) after an access road was built across a cemetery and graves were disturbed. County Times reported Vaughan said the council's finding of a breach followed his enforcement complaint and that: “It is imperative now therefore that matters are not only corrected but that not one grave [be] used as a driveway.” Nation.Cymru later reported that restoration steps were agreed following meetings with the council and the trust, quoting Vaughan describing the outcome as “a victory for common sense”.

=== Proposed national park ===
In October 2023, Vaughan proposed a Powys County Council motion to formally oppose the inclusion of areas of Powys within the proposed Glyndŵr National Park; the motion passed, according to published vote records. County Times reported Vaughan questioned the advantages of designation during a period of budget pressure, saying it was “difficult to see the advantages of a new national park whilst facing multi-million pound cuts in Powys.” The Guardian later described Vaughan as a prominent opponent of the proposal and quoted him raising concerns about visitor pressure, holiday homes and local impacts.

=== Crown Estate ===
In December 2024, Vaughan brought forward a motion at Powys County Council supporting the devolution of management of the Crown Estate to the Welsh Government. Nation.Cymru quoted Vaughan saying the proposal was “about fairness” and urging action on funding and resource allocation.

== Senedd career ==
Vaughan was candidate for Montgomeryshire in the 2021 Senedd election. He stood in Montgomeryshire and Glyndŵr at the 2024 United Kingdom general election.

Vaughan was elected at the 2026 Senedd election as a member for the newly formed Gwynedd Maldwyn constituency.

== See also ==
- 7th Senedd
