= Dwyfor Meirionnydd (Senedd constituency) =

Senedd constituency (2007–2026)

- Former Senedd county constituency for the Senedd

- Dwyfor Meirionnydd shown within the Mid and West Wales electoral region and the region shown within Wales

Former Senedd county constituency
- Created: 2007
- Abolished: 2026
- Party: Plaid Cymru
- MS: Mabon ap Gwynfor
- Preserved county: Gwynedd
- Created from: Caernarfon and Meirionnydd Nant Conwy

Dwyfor Meirionnydd was a constituency of the Senedd, first created for the former Assembly's 2007 election. It elected one Member of the Senedd by the first past the post method of election. Also, however, it was one of eight constituencies in the Mid and West Wales electoral region, which elected four additional members, in addition to nine constituency members, to produce a degree of proportional representation for the region as a whole.

== Boundaries ==
Map of 2007–2026 boundaries

The constituency shared the boundaries of the Dwyfor Meirionnydd Westminster constituency, which came into use for the 2010 United Kingdom general election, created by merging into one constituency areas which were previously within the Caernarfon and Meirionnydd Nant Conwy constituencies.

Caernarfon was a Gwynedd constituency, entirely within the preserved county of Gwynedd, and one of nine constituencies in the North Wales region. Meirionnydd Nant Conwy was partly a Gwynedd constituency and partly a Clwyd constituency, partly within the preserved county of Gwynedd and partly within the preserved county of Clwyd, and one of eight constituencies in the Mid and West Wales electoral region.

Dwyfor Meirionnydd was a Gwynedd constituency, one of three constituencies entirely within the preserved county of Gwynedd, and one of eight constituencies in the Mid and West Wales electoral region. The other Gwynedd constituencies, however, Arfon and Ynys Môn, were within the North Wales electoral region.

The Mid and West Wales region consisted of the constituencies of Brecon and Radnorshire, Carmarthen East and Dinefwr, Carmarthen West and South Pembrokeshire, Ceredigion, Dwyfor Meirionnydd, Llanelli, Montgomeryshire and Preseli Pembrokeshire.

== Voting ==
In general elections for the Senedd each voter had two votes. The first vote was used to vote for a candidate to become the Member of the Senedd for the voter's constituency, elected by the first-past-the-post system. The second vote was used to vote for a regional closed party list of candidates. Additional member seats were allocated from the lists by the d'Hondt method, with constituency results being taken into account in the allocation.

== Members of the Senedd ==
The seat had been represented since its creation in 2007 by Dafydd Elis-Thomas of Plaid Cymru, the Assembly's former Presiding Officer. He previously represented the former constituency of Meirionnydd Nant Conwy from 1999 to 2007, and was the Westminster MP for the area from 1974 to 1992. He was succeeded by Mabon ap Gwynfor of Plaid Cymru.

Period	Member	Party	Portrait
2007	Dafydd Elis-Thomas	Plaid Cymru	
2016	Dafydd Elis-Thomas	Independent	
2021	Mabon ap Gwynfor	Plaid Cymru	

== Elections ==
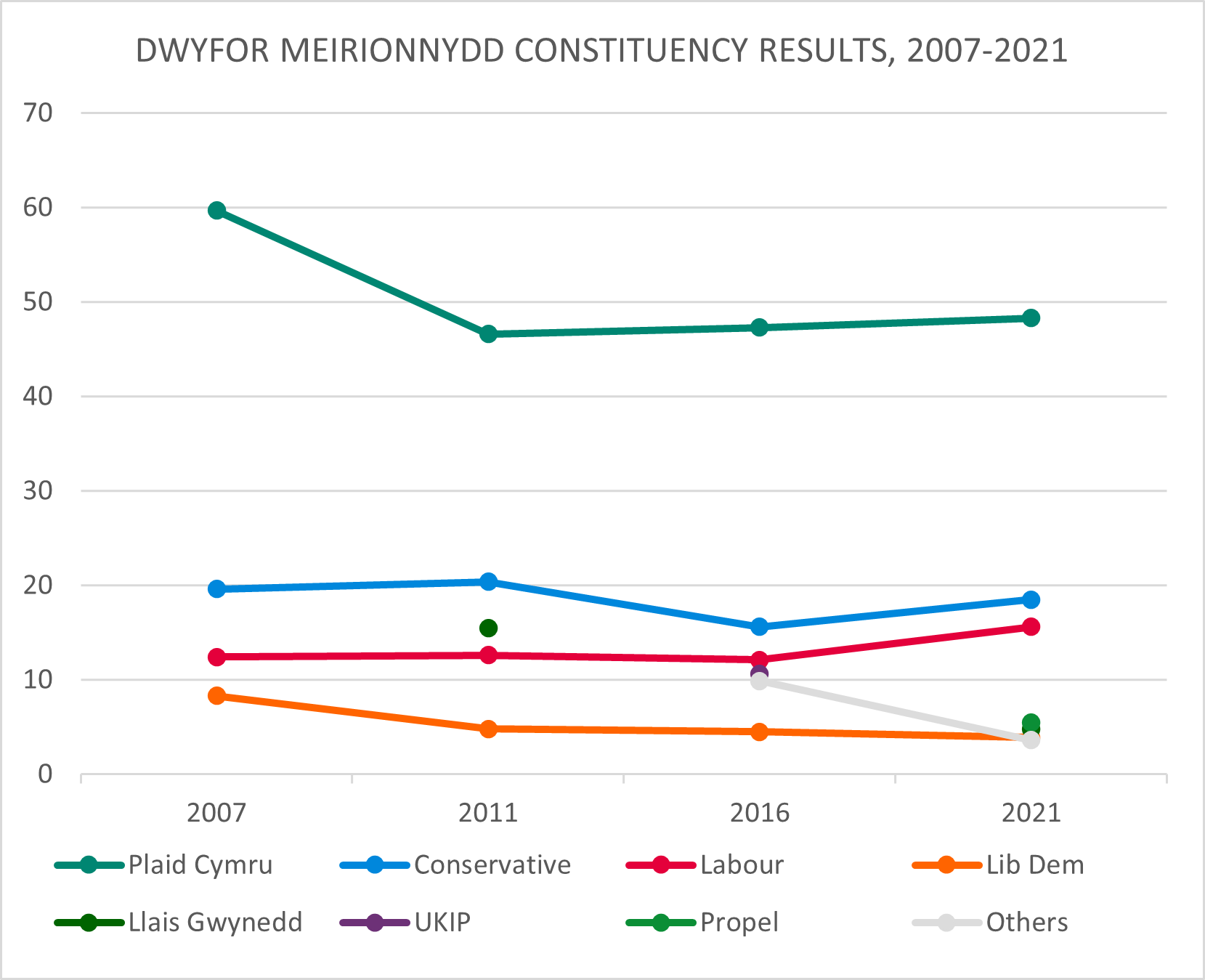
Election results since 2007 (parties who never got >5% counted as others)

=== Elections in the 2020s ===
2021 Senedd election: Dwyfor Meirionnydd
Party	Candidate	Constituency			Regional		
Party	Candidate	Votes	%	±%	Votes	%	±%
Plaid Cymru	Mabon ap Gwynfor (Note: Incumbent member for this constituency)	11,490	48.3	+1.0	10,975	45.5	+1.0
Conservative	Charlie Evans	4,394	18.5	+2.9	4,433	18.4	+1.8
Labour	Cian Ireland	3,702	15.6	+3.5	4,794	19.9	+6.2
Propel	Peter Read	1,314	5.5	New	821	3.4	New
Llais Gwynedd	Glyn Daniels	1,136	4.8	New			
Liberal Democrats	Stephen Churchman	916	3.9	-0.6	565	2.3	-1.3
Reform	Louise Hughes	710	3.0	New	129	0.5	New
Freedom Alliance (UK)	Michelle Murray	152	0.6	New	129	0.5	New
Green					993	4.1	+0.3
Abolish					468	1.9	-1.8
UKIP					238	1.0	-10.4
Gwlad					218	0.9	New
Christian					169	0.7	New
Communist					62	0.3	+0.1
TUSC					14	0.1	New
Majority		7,096	29.8	−1.9			
Turnout		23,814	47.01	+0.31			
Plaid Cymru hold		Swing	-0.95				

=== Elections in the 2010s ===
Welsh Assembly Election 2016: Dwyfor Meirionnydd
Party	Candidate	Constituency			Regional		
Party	Candidate	Votes	%	±%	Votes	%	±%
Plaid Cymru	Dafydd Elis-Thomas	9,566	47.3	+0.7	8,949	44.5	-1.1
Conservative	Neil Fairlamb	3,160	15.6	-4.8	3,332	16.6	-5.9
Labour	Ian MacIntyre	2,443	12.1	-0.5	2,759	13.7	-1.0
UKIP	Frank Wykes	2,149	10.6	New	2,299	11.4	+7.6
Independent	Louise Hughes	1,259	6.2	New			
Liberal Democrats	Stephen Churchman	916	4.5	-0.3	730	3.6	-1.1
Green	Alice Hooker-Stroud	743	3.7	New	772	3.8	-0.6
Abolish					745	3.7	New
Monster Raving Loony					94	0.5	New
Welsh Christian					112	0.6	-0.2
Association of Welsh Independents					157	0.8	New
People First (Wales)					121	0.6	New
Communist					45	0.2	-0.1
Majority		6,406	31.7	+5.5			
Turnout		20,236	46.7	+0.4			
Plaid Cymru hold		Swing	+2.75				

Welsh Assembly Election 2011: Dwyfor Meirionnydd
Party	Candidate	Constituency			Regional		
Party	Candidate	Votes	%	±%	Votes	%	±%
Plaid Cymru	Dafydd Elis-Thomas	9,656	46.6	-13.1	9,465	45.6	-4.1
Conservative	Simon Baynes	4,239	20.4	+0.8	4,665	22.5	+3.8
Llais Gwynedd	Louise Hughes	3,225	15.5	New			
Labour	Martyn Singleton	2,623	12.6	+0.2	3,059	14.7	+1.4
Liberal Democrats	Stephen Churchman	1,000	4.8	-3.5	981	4.7	+0.6
Green					920	4.4	+0.3
UKIP					799	3.8	+1.1
Socialist Labour					369	1.8	+0.4
BNP					277	1.3	-1.2
Welsh Christian					167	0.8	+0.4
Communist					61	0.3	0.0
Majority		5,417	26.2	−13.9			
Turnout		20,743	46.3	−1.1			
Plaid Cymru hold		Swing	-7.0				

Regional ballots rejected: 132

=== Elections in the 2000s ===
Welsh Assembly Election 2007: Dwyfor Meirionnydd (Note: Due to boundary changes it is only possible to compare election results from 2003 and 2007 by creating notional figures. These notional results, compiled by professors Colin Rallings and Michael Thrasher of Plymouth University, take the figures from the 2003 election and apply them to the new boundaries which are being used for the first time on 3 May 2007. Notional results for this seat with regards to the list seat were not calculated.)
Party	Candidate	Constituency			Regional		
Party	Candidate	Votes	%	±%	Votes	%	±%
Plaid Cymru	Dafydd Elis-Thomas	13,201	59.7	+2.3	10,960	49.7	N/A
Conservative	Mike Wood	4,333	19.6	+5.5	4,097	18.7	N/A
Labour	David Phillips	2,749	12.4	-9.1	2,943	13.3	N/A
Liberal Democrats	Stephen Churchman	1,839	8.3	+1.3	1,159	5.3	N/A
Green					914	4.1	N/A
UKIP					597	2.7	N/A
BNP					545	2.5	N/A
Socialist Labour					305	1.4	N/A
Gwynoro Jones - Independent					179	0.8	N/A
Welsh Christian					95	0.4	N/A
Communist					77	0.3	N/A
Veritas					69	0.3	N/A
Caroline Evans - Independent					58	0.3	N/A
CPA					54	0.2	N/A
Majority		8,868	40.1				
Turnout		22,122	47.4	+3.4			
Plaid Cymru win (new seat)							

2003 Electorate: 57,428
Regional ballots rejected: 227
