= Claire Johnson-Wood =

Welsh politician

Claire Johnson-Wood MS
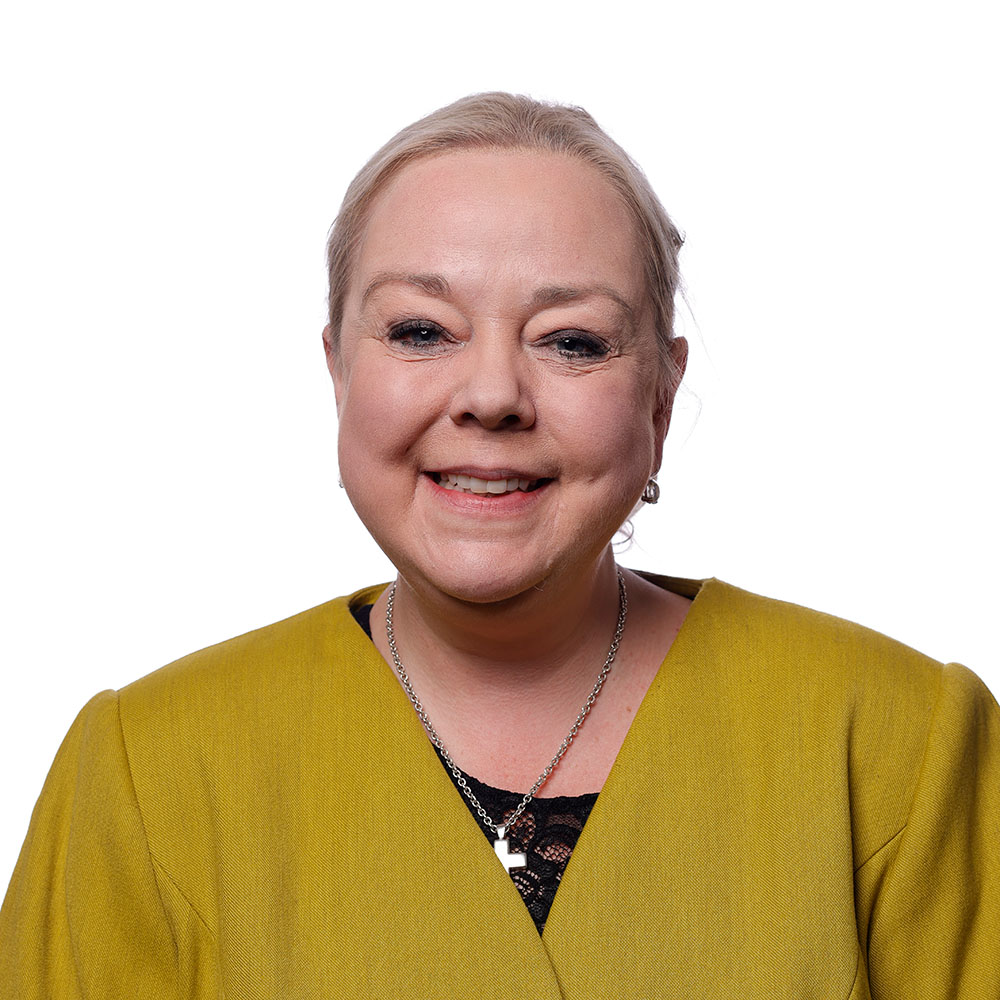
- Official portrait, 2026

Member of the Senedd for Gwynedd Maldwyn
- Incumbent
- Assumed office 8 May 2026

Powys County Councillor for Llanyre with Nantmel Ward (Note: 2017-2022 Term was representing a different form of the ward, called simply Llanyre)
- Incumbent
- Assumed office 5 May 2017

Personal details
- Party: Reform UK Wales (since 2025)
- Other political affiliations: Independent (2021–2025); Abolish the Welsh Assembly Party (2020–2021); Welsh Conservatives (until 2020)

Claire Victoria Johnson-Wood (née Mills) is a Reform UK Wales politician, serving as a Member of the Senedd (MS) for Gwynedd Maldwyn since 2026.

== Political career ==
Johnson-Wood (née Mills) was elected as a Conservative Party candidate to Powys County Council in 2017, representing the Llanyre ward. In 2020 she defected to Abolish the Welsh Assembly Party. She stood for Abolish in the 2021 Senedd election but was not elected. In 2022 she was re-elected to Powys County Council as an independent, representing the Llanyre with Nantmel ward, and in March 2025 affiliated herself with Reform UK.
