= Mabon ap Gwynfor =

Welsh politician

Mabon ap Gwynfor MS
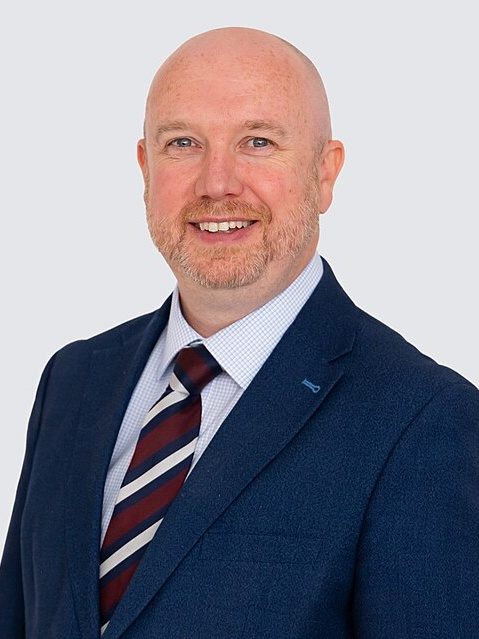
- Official portrait, 2026

Cabinet Minister for Health and Care
- Incumbent
- Assumed office 13 May 2026
- First Minister: Rhun ap Iorwerth
- Preceded by: Jeremy Miles

Plaid Cymru Chief Whip
- In office 27 June 2023 – 12 May 2026
- Leader: Rhun ap Iorwerth
- Succeeded by: Heledd Fychan

Member of the Senedd
- Incumbent
- Assumed office 7 May 2021
- Preceded by: Dafydd Elis-Thomas
- Constituency: Dwyfor Meirionnydd (2021–2026); Gwynedd Maldwyn (2026–)

Denbighsire County Councillor for Llandrillo Ward
- In office 4 May 2017 – 6 August 2021

Personal details
- Party: Plaid Cymru
- Children: 4
- Relatives: Gwynfor Evans (grandfather)
- Education: University of Wales, Bangor

Rhodri Mabon ap Gwynfor is a Welsh Plaid Cymru politician who has been Member of the Senedd (MS) for Gwynedd Maldwyn, formerly Dwyfor Meirionnydd, since 2021. He has served as Cabinet Minister for Health and Care in the ap Iorwerth government since May 2026.

== Career ==
Mabon was elected as a town councillor in Aberystwyth Town Council in 2004.

He stood for election to the British Parliament and Senedd unsuccessfully on several occasions between 2005 and 2016. He contested the Brecon and Radnorshire seat at the 2005 general election. He attempted to be selected as Plaid Cymru candidate for Ceredigion in 2010, but was not successful. He stood for the Clwyd South Senedd constituency in the 2011 and 2016 elections, and for the identically named Clwyd South constituency at the 2015 general election.

He was later elected as a Denbighshire County Councillor for Llandrillo in 2017.

=== Member of the Senedd (2021 – present) ===
In 2019 it was announced he would be the Plaid Cymru candidate for the Dwyfor Meirionnydd Senedd constituency in the 2021 Senedd elections, in a selection process involving five other candidates. He was elected, with a majority of 7,096 votes. Shortly after he was elected, in August 2021, he resigned as councillor for Llandrillo. He said it was impossible to "effectively" fulfil roles as a councillor and Senedd Member. He had previously said he would remain in place until elections to be held in May 2022.

He is a member of the Senedd Health and Social Care committee. He chairs cross-party groups on Fisheries and Aquaculture, Housing, and Peace and Reconciliation, and is vice-chair of the North Wales group. He is a member of cross-party groups on hospice and palliative care, human rights, long COVID, poverty, renewable and low carbon energy, rural growth, stroke and Welsh wool.

In 2023 he was elected as national chair of CND Cymru

In the 2026 Senedd election, Mabon was re-elected as a MS for the Gwynedd Maldwyn constituency, which replaced his former constituency of Dwyfor Meirionydd.

Following Rhun ap Iorwerth's election as First Minister, ap Gwynfor joined the Welsh Government as Cabinet Minister for Health and Care.

== Personal life ==
He is the grandson of Plaid Cymru's first Member of Parliament and former president, Gwynfor Evans. He is married, and has four children.

Mabon graduated from the University of Wales, Bangor, with a BA in History. In 2023, he self-published a book, Going Nuclear.

He was accepted to the Gorsedd of the Bards in the National Eisteddfod at Boduan in 2023.

== Selected works ==
Mabon ap Gwynfor (2023). Going Nuclear. Mabon ap Gwynfor (self). ISBN 9781845245405.

Senedd
Preceded by Dafydd Elis-Thomas	Member of the Senedd for Dwyfor Meirionnydd; 2021 – Present	Incumbent
