= Robert Buckland =

British politician (born 1968)

The Right Honourable Sir Robert Buckland KBE KC
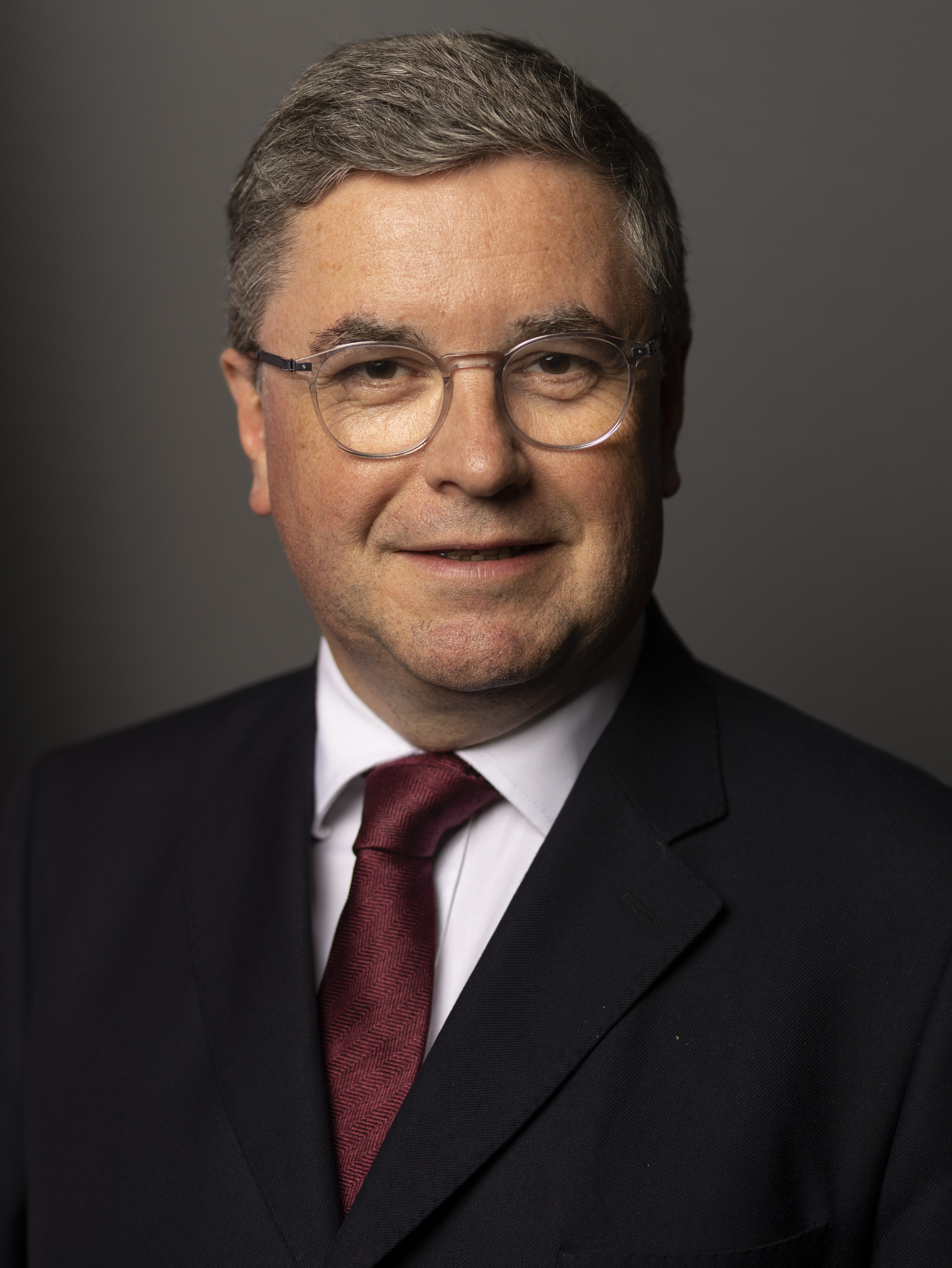
- Official portrait, 2022

Third Church Estates Commissioner
- Incumbent
- Assumed office 14 March 2025
- Preceded by: Flora Winfield

Chair of the Northern Ireland Affairs Select Committee
- In office 28 November 2023 – 30 May 2024
- Preceded by: Simon Hoare
- Succeeded by: Tonia Antoniazzi

Secretary of State for Wales
- In office 7 July 2022 – 25 October 2022
- Prime Minister: Boris Johnson; Liz Truss
- Preceded by: Simon Hart
- Succeeded by: David T. C. Davies

Secretary of State for Justice; Lord Chancellor
- In office 24 July 2019 – 15 September 2021
- Prime Minister: Boris Johnson
- Preceded by: David Gauke
- Succeeded by: Dominic Raab

Minister of State for Prisons and Probation
- In office 9 May 2019 – 24 July 2019
- Prime Minister: Theresa May
- Preceded by: Rory Stewart
- Succeeded by: Lucy Frazer

Solicitor General for England and Wales
- In office 15 July 2014 – 9 May 2019
- Prime Minister: David Cameron; Theresa May
- Preceded by: Oliver Heald
- Succeeded by: Lucy Frazer

Member of Parliament for South Swindon
- In office 6 May 2010 – 30 May 2024
- Preceded by: Anne Snelgrove
- Succeeded by: Heidi Alexander

Personal details
- Born: Robert James Buckland; 22 September 1968 (age 58) Llanelli, Wales
- Party: Conservative
- Children: 2
- Education: St Michael's School, Llanelli; Inns of Court School of Law; Hatfield College, Durham (LLB)
- Profession: Barrister, recorder
- Website: robertbuckland.co.uk

Sir Robert James Buckland (born 22 September 1968) is a British politician who served as Lord Chancellor and Secretary of State for Justice from 2019 to 2021, and as Secretary of State for Wales from July to October 2022. A member of the Conservative Party, he was first elected as the member of Parliament (MP) for South Swindon in 2010, until losing the seat in the 2024 general election.

Buckland was Solicitor General for England and Wales from 2014 to 2019 and Minister of State for Prisons from May to July 2019. He was appointed Secretary of State for Justice and Lord Chancellor by Boris Johnson in July 2019, serving until the cabinet reshuffle in September 2021. In July 2022, following the mass resignation of ministers from the Johnson government, he was appointed Secretary of State for Wales by Johnson, and continued to serve in the position under Liz Truss; he resigned from the role when new Prime Minister Rishi Sunak took office in October 2022.

Before entering politics, Buckland was a barrister practicing in Wales, and also sat as a recorder (a type of part-time judge) in the Crown Court. He was appointed honorary canon of Bristol Cathedral in 2024. After losing his seat as an MP, he was appointed as the Church of England's Third Church Estates Commissioner in 2025.

== Early life and career ==
Robert Buckland was born on 22 September 1968 in Llanelli, Wales. He was educated at Old Road County Primary School (Welsh: Ysgol yr Hen Heol) and then privately at St Michael's School, Llanelli (Welsh: Ysgol Sant Mihangel).

In 1990, he graduated in law from Hatfield College, University of Durham, where he was Secretary of the Junior Common Room and President of the Durham Union Society in Michaelmas term 1989. He was called to the bar in 1991 at the Inner Temple.

Buckland practised as a barrister in Wales from 1992 to 2010, specialising in criminal law at the Crown Court in Swansea, Cardiff, Merthyr and Newport. He was appointed as a recorder in 2009, sitting as a part-time judge in the Crown Court. He was appointed Queen's Counsel in 2014 on becoming Solicitor General and was elected as a Master of the Bench of Inner Temple.

== Pre-parliamentary political career ==
Buckland stood as the Conservative Party candidate for Elli ward on Dyfed County Council in May 1993, winning the seat from Labour with a majority of just 3 votes. It was reported that he was the first Conservative "in living memory" to have been elected in the Llanelli area. Following local government reorganisation, the Elli ward became part of the unitary Carmarthenshire County Council and Buckland stood again in 1995, losing to the Labour candidate by over 200 votes.

At the 1994 European Parliament election, Buckland stood in South Wales West, coming second with 12.2% of the vote behind the Labour candidate David Morris.

In 1995, Buckland stood in the 1995 Islwyn by-election. He came in fourth place with 3.9% of the vote.

Buckland stood in Preseli Pembrokeshire at the 1997 general election, coming second with 27.7% of the vote behind the Labour candidate Jackie Lawrence.

He was on the Conservative Party list of candidates for Wales at the 1999 European elections, but was not elected.

At the 2005 general election, Buckland stood in South Swindon, coming second with 37.2% of the vote behind the Labour candidate Anne Snelgrove.

== Parliamentary career ==
=== First term as MP (2010–2015) ===
Buckland was elected to Parliament as MP for South Swindon at the 2010 general election with 41.8% of the vote and a majority of 3,544.

In 2010, Buckland was elected to the Justice Select Committee. In 2012, along with fellow Tory MP Stuart Andrew, he called for prisoners' mobile phones to be destroyed or sold to raise money for victims' charities, saying that mobiles in prison were a "menace" and that selling them would provide a service to the country, as it costs £20,000 a year to store criminals' phones. They were both supported by Parliamentary Under-Secretary of State for Legal Aid and Legal Services Jeremy Wright and Shadow Secretary of State for Justice Sadiq Khan.

On 4 December 2012, Buckland was elected Joint Secretary of the 1922 Backbench Committee. He was also Chair of the Conservative Human Rights Commission from 2011 to 2014. He sat on the Standards Committee and the Privileges Committee from 2012 to 2014. He also served on the Joint Committee on Human Rights from 2013 to 2014 and the Joint Committee on Privacy and Superinjunctions which was convened from 2011 to 2012.

On 15 July 2014, Buckland was appointed Solicitor General for England and Wales, replacing Oliver Heald as part of a wide-ranging Government reshuffle.

His appointment as Solicitor General for England and Wales in July 2014 attracted media attention after it was revealed that in 2011 the Bar Standards Board (BSB) had sanctioned Buckland for breaching BSB standards of conduct. Buckland had led an investigation in 2008 into a racially motivated attack at a school at which he was a governor. Despite having no legal grounds to do so, Buckland sought to obtain documents relating to the incident that were held by a barrister representing one of the pupils involved. In response, the attorney general's office stated that Buckland's breach had been "minor" and that the finding "was removed from the Bar records after two years and therefore Mr Buckland was not required to declare it upon appointment as Solicitor General."

In February 2015, it was reported that Buckland was one of a number of individuals investing in the Invicta Film Partnership, which HM Revenue and Customs (HMRC) had alleged to be a tax avoidance scheme. This followed a tax tribunal that had ruled that two film partnership schemes were being used primarily for tax avoidance rather than for business purposes and that the investors were not therefore entitled to the claimed tax relief. Buckland responded that he had not attempted to avoid tax and his investments were a matter of public record. He argued his financial adviser had looked into the companies and found them to be completely beyond reproach.

=== Cameron ministry ===
At the 2015 general election, Buckland was re-elected as MP for South Swindon with an increased vote share of 46.2% and an increased majority of 5,785.

In January 2016, the Labour Party unsuccessfully proposed an amendment in Parliament that would have required private landlords to make their homes "fit for human habitation". According to Parliament's register of interests, Buckland was one of 72 Conservative MPs who voted against the amendment who personally derived an income from renting out property. The Conservative Government had responded to the amendment that they believed homes should be fit for human habitation but did not want to pass the new law that would explicitly require it.

In 2016 it was reported that his preference was to remain in the EU, though Buckland never publicly stated this.

=== May ministry ===
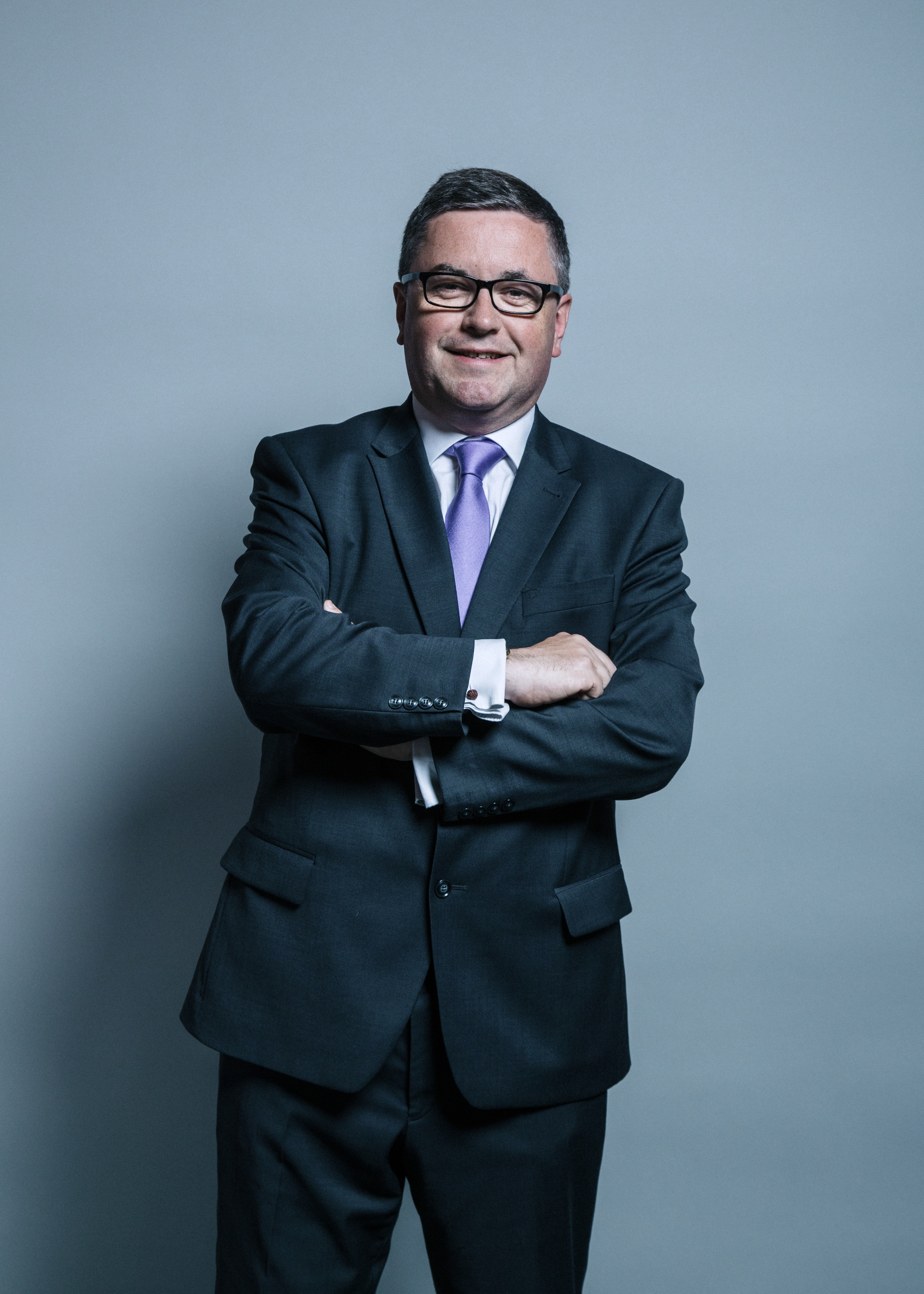
Buckland's official portrait, 2017

At the snap 2017 general election, Buckland was again re-elected, with an increased vote share of 48.4% and a decreased majority of 2,464.

In May 2019, Buckland was appointed as Minister of State for Prisons and Probation at the Ministry of Justice in succession to Rory Stewart, who had been appointed as Secretary of State for International Development. Buckland was replaced as Solicitor General for England and Wales by Lucy Frazer.

=== Secretary of State for Justice ===
On 24 July 2019, Buckland was appointed Justice Secretary and Lord Chancellor by incoming Prime Minister Boris Johnson. He was sworn in as a Member of the Privy Council the next day.

He said that he had considerable relevant experience and expressed an intention to "help drive through a massive programme of change".

A week after being sworn-in, in an interview for The Times newspaper, he expressed the opinion that suspects accused of serious crimes should be granted anonymity if the accusations threatened their reputation, stating "let's say you are a reputable local business person who is accused of fraud. Your good name is going to be really undermined by this mere accusation. That might be a meritorious case for anonymity". In response to the interview, Ian Murray, director of the Society of Editors, said it was "absurd to suggest that in a liberal democracy we are going to create a system of justice that enables the rich, the powerful and celebrities to be protected when they are under investigation for serious crimes but the ordinary man or woman would be offered no such protections." Buckland's opinion was rejected by a Government spokesman, who confirmed "this is not government policy", and the Ministry of Justice, which confirmed "this isn't departmental policy" and stated that Buckland would not be giving further interviews on the subject, which would now be handled by Downing Street.

In the House of Commons, Buckland sat on the Speaker's Advisory Committee on Works of Art, Statutory Instruments (Select and Joint Committees), Standards and Privileges Committee, Privacy and Injunctions (Joint Committee), Consolidation Bills (Joint Committee), Justice Committee and Human Rights (Joint Committee).

At the 2019 Conservative Party Conference, Buckland set out plans to ensure that sexual and violent offenders would be required to serve two-thirds of their custodial sentence in prison, as opposed to half.

Buckland was again re-elected at the 2019 general election, with an increased vote share of 52.3% and an increased majority of 6,625.

In January 2020, Buckland announced he wished to open a new prison in Wales, despite the recent withdrawal of plans for a 1,600 prisoner "category C super-prison" in Port Talbot. The proposal came after the announcement of Boris Johnson's plan to create a further 10,000 prison places in England and Wales. The BBC at the time cited Cardiff University and Wales Governance Centre research which found Wales had "the highest imprisonment rate in western Europe".

In September 2020, Buckland stated on The Andrew Marr Show that he would resign only if the UK Internal Market Bill broke the law "in a way I find unacceptable". Buckland defended plans to potentially override the Brexit withdrawal agreement as an emergency "insurance policy". He said he hoped powers being sought by ministers in the Internal Market Bill would never be needed, as a solution could be found with the EU.

Buckland oversaw a UK prison management response to the COVID-19 pandemic which increased the time prisoners spent in their cells, but achieved what were seen as low infection rates.

On 15 September 2021, Buckland was dismissed as Justice Secretary after Johnson reshuffled his cabinet.

=== Secretary of State for Wales ===
He was reinstated into Johnson's cabinet on 7 July 2022 when he succeeded Simon Hart as Secretary of State for Wales.

On 13 August, Buckland wrote an article in The Daily Telegraph, changing his support from Rishi Sunak to Liz Truss in the July–September 2022 Conservative Party leadership election after disagreements with the former about the proposed British Bill of Rights.

On 6 September 2022, he was re-appointed by Prime Minister Liz Truss. It was reported that he declined to take up the role of Secretary of State for Northern Ireland. As Welsh Secretary, Buckland played a role in the proceedings following the death of Queen Elizabeth II, attending the Accession Council and the proclamation of accession of King Charles III at Cardiff Castle.

At the 2022 Conservative Party Conference, Buckland stated his view that benefits should be uprated in line with inflation, amid a public debate on the matter, along with fellow cabinet ministers Penny Mordaunt and Chloe Smith.

=== Return to the backbenches ===
On 25 October 2022, Buckland stood down from the Government upon Rishi Sunak's appointment as Prime Minister. He subsequently returned to the backbenches.

After leaving the role of Welsh Secretary, Buckland accepted an appointment to lead a review into boosting employment opportunities for autistic people on behalf of the Government and the Department for Work and Pensions in 2023.

The November 2023 cabinet reshuffle saw Simon Hoare, the chair of the Northern Ireland Affairs Committee, made a local government minister, with Buckland announcing his intention to run to replace him as chairman. In the event, Buckland was elected unopposed.

Buckland lost his Swindon seat to Labour in the 2024 general election. He was the first Conservative incumbent candidate to lose in the election night.

== Post-parliamentary career ==
On 25 February 2025, it was announced that Buckland would be the next Third Church Estates Commissioner, one of the senior lay people in the Church of England who has an automatic seat on the General Synod. The Third Church Estates Commissioner chairs two committees: the Mission, Pastoral and Church Property Committee, and the Bishoprics and Cathedrals Committee. He took up the post on 14 March 2025.

== Personal life ==
Buckland is married to Sian, whom he met at university. They had twins in 2002, and live in Wroughton in his former constituency. Buckland's interests include music, wine, political history and watching rugby and cricket. Buckland has a cat, named "Mrs Landingham" after a character on The West Wing.

In January 2013, Buckland was awarded the "Grassroot Diplomat Initiative Award" under the Social Driving category for his extensive work on advocating awareness at Parliament for children with special educational needs, including those with autism, both locally and nationally.

Buckland was appointed Knight Commander of the Order of the British Empire (KBE) in the 2022 Political Honours and was invested by King Charles III in November 2022. He was awarded an honorary degree in 2022 by Bangor University for Public Service.

Buckland is an Anglican Christian, and was made a lay canon of Bristol Cathedral in March 2024.

Parliament of the United Kingdom
Preceded by Anne Snelgrove	Member of Parliament for Swindon South; 2010–2024	Succeeded by Heidi Alexander
Legal offices
Preceded by Oliver Heald	Solicitor General for England and Wales; 2015–2019	Succeeded by Lucy Frazer
Political offices
Preceded by Rory Stewart	Minister of State for Prisons; 2019	Succeeded by Lucy Frazer
Preceded by David Gauke	Secretary of State for Justice; 2019–2021	Succeeded by Dominic Raab
Preceded by David Gauke	Lord High Chancellor of Great Britain; 2019–2021	Succeeded by Dominic Raab
Preceded by Simon Hart	Secretary of State for Wales; 2022	Succeeded by David T. C. Davies
