= Wales (European Parliament constituency) =

Former European Parliament constituency

- European Parliament constituency
- Location among the 2014 constituencies

- Shown in the United Kingdom
- Member state: United Kingdom
- Created: 1999
- Dissolved: 31 January 2020
- MEPs: 5 (1999–2004); 4 (2004–2020)

Wales (Welsh: Cymru [ˈkəmrɨ]) was a constituency of the European Parliament. It elected 4 MEPs using the D'Hondt method of party-list proportional representation, until the UK exit from the European Union on 31 January 2020.

== Boundaries ==
The constituency corresponded to the boundaries of Wales, one of the four countries of the United Kingdom.

== History ==
It was formed as a result of the European Parliamentary Elections Act 1999, replacing a number of single-member constituencies. These were Mid and West Wales, North Wales, South Wales Central, South Wales East, and South Wales West.

MEPs for former Welsh constituencies, 1979–1999
Election	1979–1984	1984–1989	1989–1994	1994–1999
North Wales	Beata Brookes; Conservative		Joe Wilson; Labour	
Mid and West Wales	Ann Clwyd; Labour	David Morris; Labour		Eluned Morgan; Labour
South East Wales (1979–1984) South Wales East (1984–1999)	Allan Rogers; Labour	Llew Smith; Labour		Glenys Kinnock; Labour
South Wales	Win Griffiths; Labour		Wayne David; Labour	Constituency abolished
South Wales Central	Constituency not established			Wayne David; Labour
South Wales West	Constituency not established			David Morris; Labour

== Returned members ==
MEPs for Wales, 1999 onwards
Election	1999 (5th parliament)	2004 (6th parliament)	2009 (7th parliament)	2014 (8th parliament)	2019 (9th parliament)
MEP Party	Jonathan Evans; Conservative		Kay Swinburne; Conservative		James Wells; Brexit Party
MEP Party	Eluned Morgan; Labour		John Bufton; UKIP	Nathan Gill; UKIP (until 2018); Independent (2018–2019); Brexit Party (from 2019)	
MEP Party	Glenys Kinnock; Labour		Derek Vaughan; Labour		Jackie Jones; Labour
MEP Party	Jill Evans; Plaid Cymru				
MEP Party	Eurig Wyn; Plaid Cymru	Seat abolished			

Key to political groups of the European Parliament (UK)
Party			Faction in European Parliament	
Brexit Party	29		Non-Inscrits	57
DUP	1		Non-Inscrits	57
Liberal Democrats	16	17	Renew Europe	108
Alliance	1	17	Renew Europe	108
Green	7	11	Greens–European Free Alliance	75
SNP	3	11	Greens–European Free Alliance	75
Plaid Cymru	1	11	Greens–European Free Alliance	75
Labour	10		Socialists and Democrats	154
Conservative	4		European Conservatives and Reformists Group	62
Sinn Féin	1		European United Left–Nordic Green Left	41
Total	73		Total	750

== Election results ==
Elected candidates are shown in bold. Brackets indicate the number of votes per seat won.

=== 2019 ===
Map showing highest polling party by counting area in the 2019 European Parliament election; Brexit Party Plaid Cymru

European Election 2019: Wales
List	Candidates	Votes	Of total (%)	± from prev.
Brexit Party	**Nathan Gill** (1) **James Wells** (3) Gethin James, Julie Price	271,404 (135,702)	32.46	▲32.46
Plaid Cymru	**Jill Evans** (2) Carmen Smith, Patrick McGuinness, Ioan Bellin	163,928	19.60	▲4.34
Labour	**Jacqueline Jones** (4) Matthew Dorrance, Mary Wimbury, Mark Whitcutt	127,833	15.29	▼12.86
Liberal Democrats	Sam Bennett, Donna Lalek, Alistair Cameron, Andrew Parkhurst	113,885	13.62	▲9.67
Conservative	Daniel Boucher, Craig Lawton, Fay Jones, Tomos Davies	54,587	6.53	▼10.90
Green	Anthony Slaughter, Ian Chandler, Ceri Davies, Duncan Rees	52,660	6.30	▲1.76
UKIP	Kristian Hicks, Keith Edwards, Thomas Harrison, Robert McNeil-Wilson	27,566	3.30	▼24.25
Change UK	Jon Owen Jones, June Davies, Matthew Paul, Sally Anne Stephenson	24,332	2.91	▲2.91
Turnout		836,195	37.1	▲5.6

==== 2019 opinion polls ====
Date(s)	Polling organisation/client	Sample	Lab	UKIP	Con	Plaid	Green	Lib Dems	Brexit	Change UK	Others	Lead
16–20 May 2019	YouGov/ITV	1,009	15%	2%	7%	19%	8%	10%	**36%**	2%	0%	17%
10–15 May 2019	YouGov/Plaid Cymru	1,133	18%	3%	7%	16%	8%	10%	**33%**	4%	0%	15%
2–5 April 2019	YouGov/ITV	1,025	**30%**	11%	16%	15%	5%	6%	10%	8%	1%	14%
22 May 2014	**2014 EU election results**	733,060	**28.2%**	27.6%	17.4%	15.3%	4.5%	4.0%	N/A	N/A	3.2%	0.6%

=== 2014 ===
Map outlining the highest polling party by county / county borough in Wales for the 2014 election; Labour UKIP Conservatives Plaid Cymru

European Election 2014: Wales
List	Candidates	Votes	Of total (%)	± from prev.
Labour	**Derek Vaughan** (1) Jayne Bryant, Alex Thomas, Christina Rees	206,332	28.15	▲7.8
UKIP	**Nathan Gill** (2) James Cole, Caroline Jones, David Rowlands	201,983	27.55	▲14.7
Conservative	**Kay Swinburne** (3) Aled Davies, Dan Boucher, Richard Hopkin	127,742	17.43	▼3.8
Plaid Cymru	**Jill Evans** (4) Marc Jones, Stephen Cornelius, Ioan Bellin	111,864	15.26	▼3.2
Green	Pippa Bartolotti, John Matthews, Chris Were, Rosemary Cutler	33,275	4.54	▼1.1
Liberal Democrats	Alec Dauncey, Robert Speht, Jackie Radford, Bruce Roberts	28,930	3.95	▼6.8
BNP	Mike Whitby, Laurence Reid, Jean Griffin, Gary Tumulty	7,655	1.04	▼4.4
Britain First	Paul Golding, Anthony Golding, Christine Smith, Anne Elstone	6,633	0.9	New
Socialist Labour	Andrew Jordan, Katherine Jones, David Lloyd Jones, Liz Screen	4,459	0.61	▼1.2
NO2EU	Robert Griffiths, Claire Job, Steve Skelly, Laura Picand	2,803	0.38	▼0.9
Socialist (GB)	Brian Johnson, Richard Cheney, Ed Blewitt, Howard Moss	1,384	0.19	New
Turnout		733,060	31.5	▲1.1

==== 2014 opinion polls ====
Date(s)	Polling organisation/client	Sample	Con	Lab	Plaid	UKIP	Lib Dems	Others	Lead
22 May 2014	EU election, 2014 (Wales) Results	733,060	17.4%	**28.2%**	15.3%	27.6%	4.0%	7.7%	0.6%
12–14 May 2014	YouGov/ITV	1,092	16%	**33%**	15%	23%	7%	7%	10%
11–22 Apr 2014	YouGov/Cardiff University	1,027	18%	**39%**	11%	20%	7%	6%	19%
10–12 Feb 2014	YouGov/ITV	1,250	17%	**39%**	12%	18%	7%	7%	21%
2–4 Dec 2013	YouGov/ITV	1,001	20%	**41%**	13%	13%	8%	5%	21%
4 Jun 2009	EU election, 2009 (Wales) Results	684,520	**21.2%**	20.3%	18.5%	12.8%	10.7%	16.6%	0.9%

=== 2009 ===
Map outlining the highest polling party by county / county borough in Wales for the 2009 election; Labour Conservatives Plaid Cymru

European Election 2009: Wales
List	Candidates	Votes	Of total (%)	± from prev.
Conservative	**Kay Swinburne** (1) Evan Price, Emma Greenow, David Chipp	145,193	21.2	▲1.8
Labour	**Derek Vaughan** (2) Lisa Stevens, Rachel Maycock, Leighton Veale	138,852	20.3	▼12.2
Plaid Cymru	**Jill Evans** (3) Eurig Wyn, Ioan Bellin, Natasha Asghar	126,702	18.5	▲1.1
UKIP	**John Bufton** (4) David Bevan, Kevin Mahoney, David Rowlands	87,585	12.8	▲2.3
Liberal Democrats	Alan Butt Phillip, Kevin O'Connor, Nick Tregoning, Jackie Radford	73,082	10.7	▲0.2
Green	Jake Griffiths, Kay Roney, Ann Were, John Matthews	38,160	5.6	▲2.0
BNP	Ennys Hughes, Laurence Read, Clive Bennett, Kevin Edwards	37,114	5.4	▲2.4
Christian	Jeffrey Green, David Griffiths, Alun Owen, John Harrold	13,037	1.9	New
Socialist Labour	Robert English, Richard Booth, Liz Screen, Judith Sambrook	12,402	1.8	New
NO2EU	Robert Griffiths, Rob Williams, Laura Picand, Trevor Jones	8,600	1.3	New
Jury Team	Paul Sabanskis, James Eustace, Neil Morgan, Steven Partridge	3,793	0.6	New
Turnout		684,520	30.4	▼11.0

=== 2004 ===
Map outlining the highest polling party by county / county borough in Wales for the 2004 election; Labour Conservatives Plaid Cymru

European Election 2004: Wales
List	Candidates	Votes	Of total (%)	± from prev.
Labour	**Glenys Kinnock** (1) **Eluned Morgan** (4) Gareth Williams, Gwennan Jeremiah	297,810 (148,905)	32.5	▲0.6
Conservative	**Jonathan Evans** (2) Owen Williams, Felicity Elphick, Albert Fox	177,771	19.4	▼3.3
Plaid Cymru	**Jill Evans** (3) Jon Blackwood, Eilian Williams, Gwenllian Lansdown	159,888	17.4	▼12.2
UKIP	David Rowlands, Clive Easton, Elizabeth Phillips, Timothy Jenkins	96,677	10.5	▲7.4
Liberal Democrats	David John Williams, Alison Goldsworthy, Nicholas Tregoning, Nilmini Priyanga de Silva	96,116	10.5	▲2.4
Green	Martyn Shrewsbury, Molly Scott Cato, David Bradney, Dorienne Robinson	32,761	3.6	▲1.0
BNP	John Walker, Pauline Gregory, James Roberts, Mark Stringfellow	27,135	3.0	New
Forward Wales	Ron Davies, Wendy Paintsil, Janet Williams, Graham Jones	17,280	1.9	New
Christian Democratic Party	Catherine Smith, Christine West, Joseph Biddulph, Robert Evans	6,821	0.7	New
Respect	Helen Griffin, Huw Williams, Raja Gul Raiz, Taran O'Sullivan	5,427	0.6	New
Turnout		917,686	41.4	▲12.4

=== 1999 ===
Map outlining the highest polling party by county / county borough in Wales for the 1999 election; Labour Conservatives Plaid Cymru

European Election 1999: Wales
List	Candidates	Votes	Of total (%)	± from prev.
Labour	**Glenys Kinnock** (1) **Eluned Morgan** (4) Joe Wilson, Gareth Williams, Jane Hutt	199,690 (99,845)	31.9	
Plaid Cymru	**Jill Evans** (2) **Eurig Wyn** (5) Marc Phillips, Susanna Perkins, Owain Llywelyn	185,235 (92,617.5)	29.6	
Conservative	**Jonathan Evans** (3) Chris Butler, Owen John Williams, Robert Buckland, Edmund Hayward	142,631	22.8	
Liberal Democrats	Roger Roberts, Peter Price, Alistair Cameron, Juliana Hughes, John Dixon	51,283	8.2	
UKIP	Dai Rees, Niall Warry, Idris Richard Francis, Alan Barham, David Lloyd	19,702	3.1	
Green	Molly Scott Cato, Klaus Armstrong-Braun, Sue Walker, Rachel Kalela, John Matthews	16,146	2.6	
Pro-Euro Conservative	William Powell, Jennifer Harris, Antonio Fernandes-Vidal, Alan Morris, Christopher Hodgkinson	5,834	0.9	
Socialist Labour	Elizabeth Screen, Darren Hickery, Stephen Bell, Miriam Bowen, George Tafarides	4,283	0.7	
Natural Law	David Hughes, Brian Francis, Helen Evans, Andrea Jarman, John Ashforth	1,621	0.3	
Turnout		626,425	29.0	
