= Beata Brookes =

British politician (1930–2015)

Beata Brookes CBE
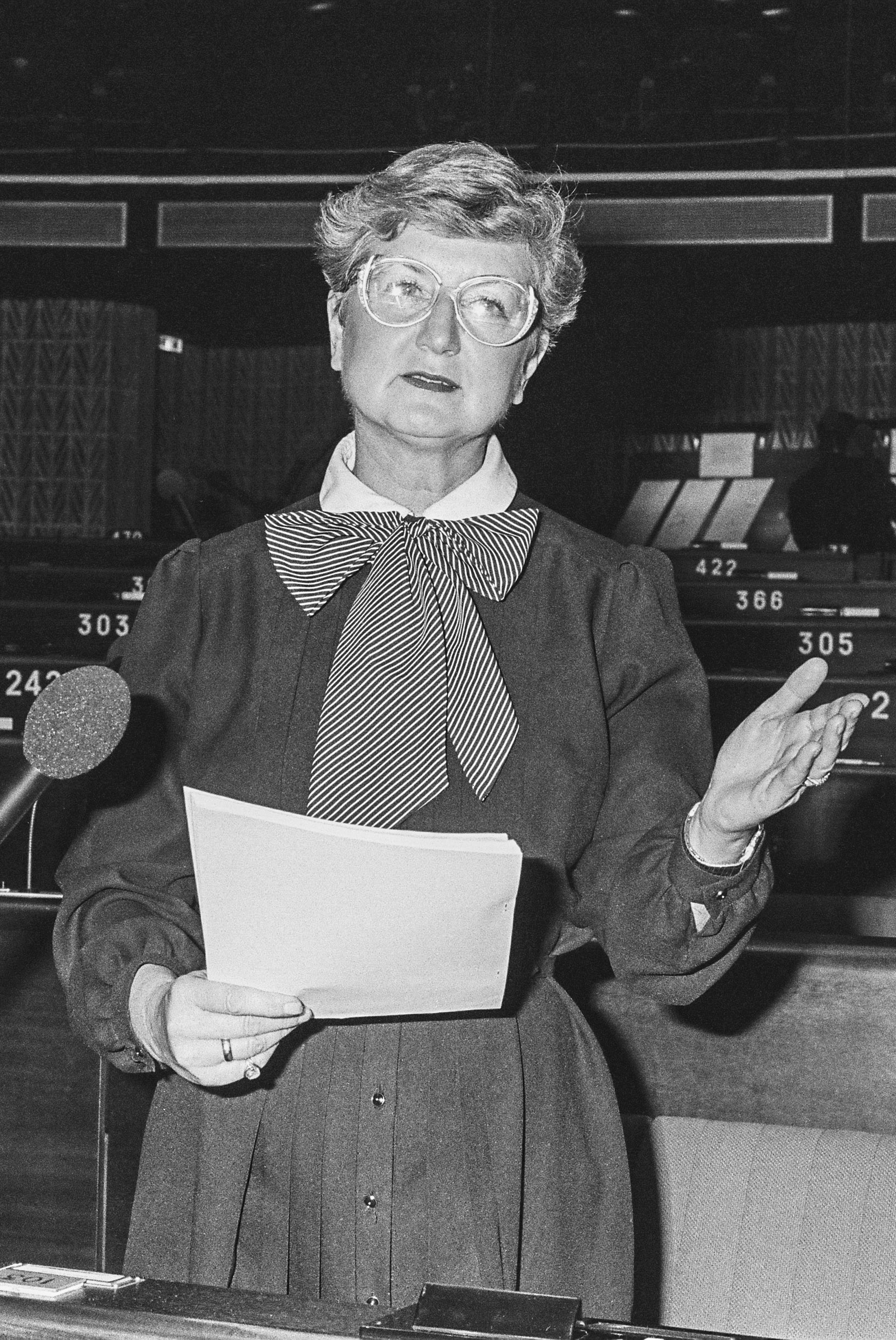
- Brookes speaking in the European Parliament in 1984

Member of the European Parliament
- In office 17 July 1979 – 24 July 1989
- Succeeded by: Joe Wilson
- Constituency: North Wales

Personal details
- Born: Beata Ann Brookes; 21 January 1930
- Died: 17 August 2015 (aged 85)
- Education: Lowther College
- Alma mater: University of Wales, Bangor

Beata Ann Brookes CBE (21 January 1930 – 17 August 2015) was a British social worker, company secretary and Conservative Party politician. She served ten years as Member of the European Parliament for North Wales, and made several attempts to obtain election to the House of Commons. She was sometimes nicknamed the "Celtic Iron Lady".

== Education ==
Brookes was educated at Lowther College in Abergele and went on to the University of Wales, Bangor. She obtained a scholarship from the State Department to study politics in the US. She began to work as company secretary and director of a North Wales firm.

== Political activity ==
Her early interest in politics took her into the Conservative Party and she was elected to the executive of the National Union of Conservative and Unionist Associations. She was also elected as a Conservative to Rhyl Urban District Council, and aged just 25 in the 1955 general election she fought Widnes which was a marginal Labour-held seat. She lost by only 1,449 votes.

She later worked for Denbighshire County Council as a social worker, and as a farmer. In 1961 she was Conservative candidate in the Warrington by-election, a safe Labour seat. At the 1964 general election she fought in Manchester Exchange. She was appointed by the Conservative government to the Welsh Hospital Board in 1963, where she remained for eleven years. Although she had married Anthony Arnold, in May 1963 they were divorced and she announced that she wished to remain known as Miss Beata Brookes.

== Local posts ==
From 1973 Brookes was a member of Clwyd Area Health Authority, where she served on the Family Practitioner Committee, and was also co-opted onto Clwyd County Council Social Services Committee. She was a member of the Council for Professions Supplementary to Medicine and had several voluntary sector posts in North Wales relating to the disabled and mentally handicapped.

== European Parliament ==
At the 1979 European Parliament election, Brookes was elected as Conservative MEP for North Wales. She was a strong supporter of British membership of the European Communities and in 1981 at the Conservative Party conference moved a motion condemning the then Labour policy of leaving it; she argued that such a policy would leave Britain weak, friendless, isolated and bankrupt. She pointed to statistics about the economy and trade with Europe to claim that one job in three depended on Britain staying in.

== Selection dispute ==
Brookes made a determined effort to be selected for the boundary changed constituency of Clwyd North West at the 1983 general election, over the claims of the sitting MPs for West Flintshire (Sir Anthony Meyer) and Denbigh (Geraint Morgan). The selection contest attracted national attention and Conservative Central Office decided to stay out of the dispute. On 6 March, Brookes won the selection vote in the Clwyd North West Conservative Executive, with Meyer describing the meeting as having been fixed and Morgan saying that speaking at the meeting was "like speaking to a nobbled jury".

Conservative Party chairman Cecil Parkinson then intervened, arising out of a newspaper report that Brookes claimed Central Office put her forward for the nomination (Meyer was a leading "wet" who was not popular with the Conservative leadership). When the Executive of Clwyd North West Conservative Association placed only Brookes' name before the general membership for adoption, Meyer won a High Court judgment that his name should also be offered. When the full membership met on 9 May 1983, Meyer was narrowly adopted.

== Further political life ==
Brookes remained in the European Parliament. She protested in December 1983 over a BBC interview with the Welsh republican John Jenkins, who had been jailed for a bombing campaign at the time of the investiture of Charles, Prince of Wales. In the European Parliament she was a member of the Education and Agricultural Committees. She was defeated by the Labour Party candidate at the 1989 European Parliament elections.

She remained involved in Welsh Conservative politics and in 1993 was chair of the Welsh Conservative Party, and proclaimed her support for John Major at a time when he was under fire from within the party. She was appointed Chair of the Welsh Consumer Council, but her re-appointment in 1994 went ahead despite criticism from the National Consumer Council that despite her ability, a non-political choice would be more appropriate. She was awarded the CBE in 1996. On 3 May 2013 she joined UKIP.

== Car boot sales ==
Although retired, she was still considered newsworthy in 2003 when she won permission to hold more "car boot sales" on her land at Rhuddlan on 14 Saturdays in a year. She had in 2000 obtained permission to hold sales on 28 Sundays in a year, and also offered the land for use for fireworks displays and the National Eisteddfod of Wales.

== Bibliography ==
- "Who's Who 2007", A & C Black
- The Times

European Parliament
Preceded by Direct elections began	Member of the European Parliament for North Wales; 1979–1989	Succeeded by Joe Wilson
