= South Wales West (European Parliament constituency) =

Former European Parliament constituency

- European Parliament constituency
- Boundary within Wales (1994-1999)
- Member state: United Kingdom
- Created: 1994
- Dissolved: 1999
- MEPs: 1

South Wales West was a European Parliament constituency covering part of south Wales, including the city of Swansea.

Prior to its uniform adoption of proportional representation in 1999, the United Kingdom used first-past-the-post for the European elections in England, Scotland and Wales. The European Parliament constituencies used under that system were smaller than the later regional constituencies and only had one Member of the European Parliament each.

The constituency consisted of the Westminster Parliament constituencies of Aberavon, Bridgend, Gower, Neath, Ogmore, Swansea East and Swansea West.

The constituency replaced parts of South Wales and Mid and West Wales in 1994 and became part of the much larger Wales constituency in 1999.

== Members of the European Parliament ==
Elected	Name	Party
1994	David Morris	Labour

== Results ==
European Parliament election, 1994: South Wales West
Party	Candidate	Votes	%	±%
Labour	David Morris	104,263	66.1	
Conservative	Robert Buckland	19,293	12.2	
Liberal Democrats	John G. Bushell	15,499	9.8	
Plaid Cymru	Mrs. Catherine M. Adams	12,364	7.9	
Green	Miss Jan B. Evans	4,114	2.6	
Natural Law	Miss Helen Evans	1,112	0.7	
European Candidate from Planet Beanus	Captain Beany	1,106	0.7	
Majority		84,970	53.9	
Turnout		157,751	39.9	
Labour win (new seat)				
