= 1984 Cynon Valley by-election =

UK parliamentary by-election

- 3 May 1984

Constituency of Cynon Valley
- Turnout: 65.7% (▼7.7%)
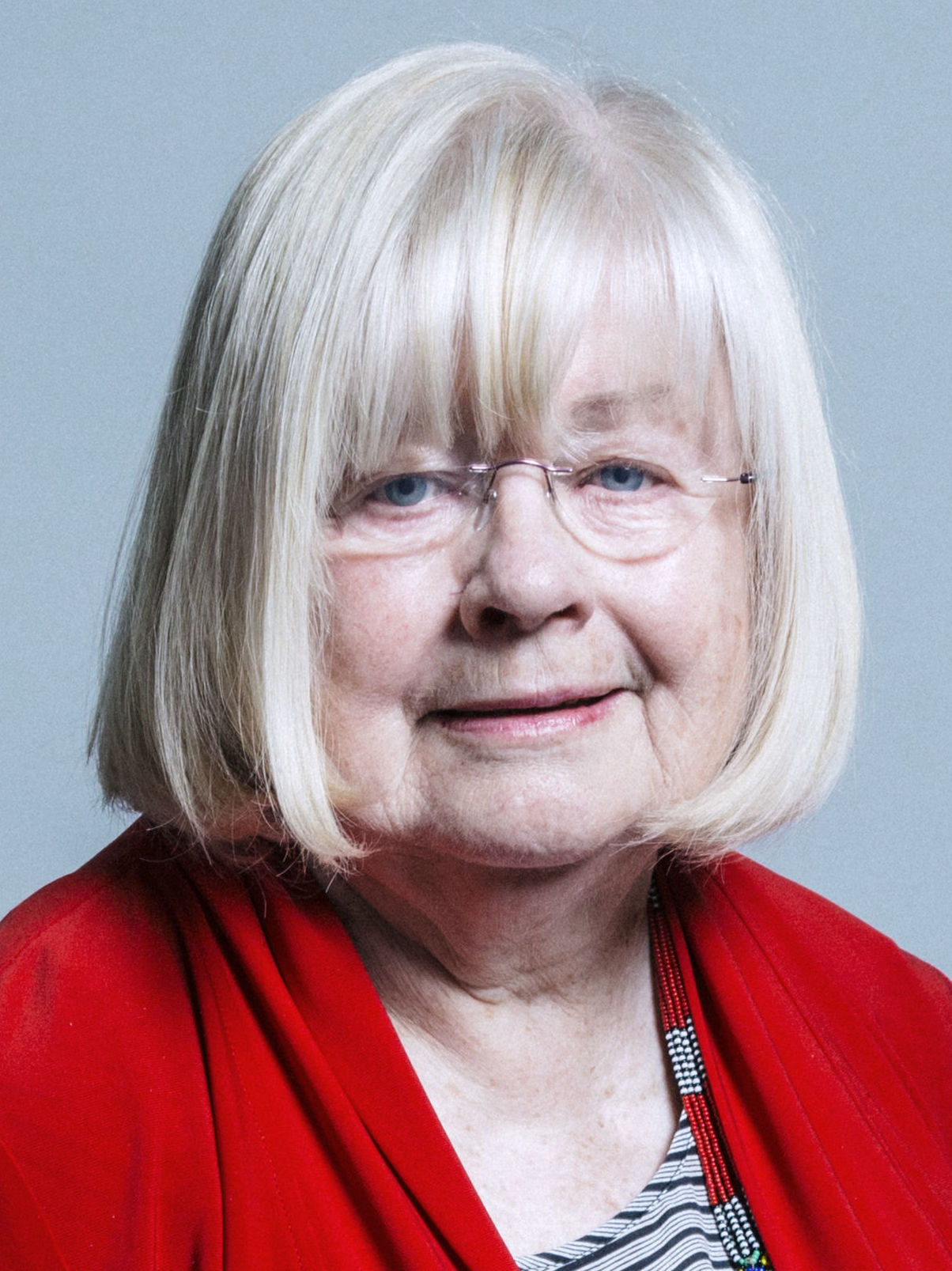

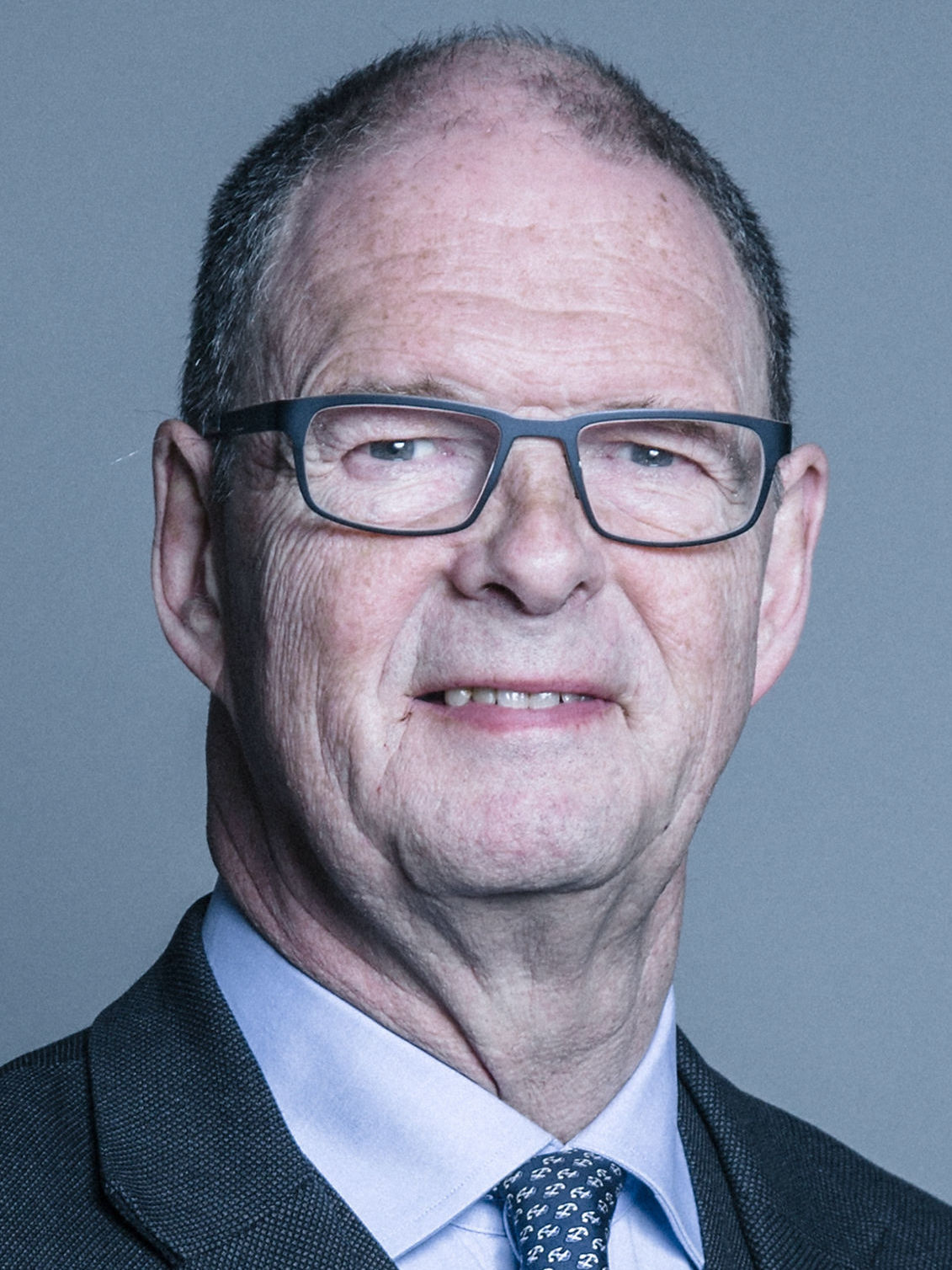
	First party	Second party
		SDP
Candidate	Ann Clwyd	Felix Aubel
Party	Labour	SDP
Popular vote	19,389	6,554
Percentage	58.8%	19.9%
Swing	▲2.8%	▼0.7%
	Third party	Fourth party
	PC
Candidate	Clayton Jones	James Arbuthnot
Party	Plaid Cymru	Conservative
Popular vote	3,619	2,441
Percentage	11.0%	7.4%
Swing	▲1.8%	▼6.8%
MP before election
Ioan Evans
Labour
Elected MP
Ann Clwyd
Labour

The 1984 Cynon Valley by-election was a parliamentary by-election held on 3 May 1984 for the House of Commons constituency of Cynon Valley.

== Previous MP ==
The seat had become vacant on 10 February 1984. The constituency's Labour Member of Parliament (MP), Ioan Lyonel Evans (10 July 1927 – 10 February 1984), had died at the age of 56.

Evans was a Labour Co-operative politician. He was educated at Llanelli Grammar School and Swansea University College. He served on the West Bromwich education committee and acted as Labour Party agent for the general elections in 1955 and 1959 in Birmingham Small Heath. He was secretary of Birmingham and District Co-operative Party.

Evans was elected as Labour Co-operative MP for Birmingham Yardley at the 1964 general election, but lost the seat in 1970. He was Comptroller of the Household from 1968 to 1970.

At the February 1974 general election he was returned for the Welsh seat of Aberdare which was abolished in 1983, with Evans taking the new seat of Cynon Valley.

== Candidates ==
Seven candidates were nominated.

1. Mrs Ann Clwyd Roberts (usually known as Ann Clwyd), born 21 March 1937, a broadcaster and journalist was selected to run for Labour.

She had been a Member of the European Parliament (MEP) for Mid and West Wales 1979–1984 and had contested the Westminster seat of Denbigh in 1970. After winning the by-election, she held the seat until her retirement in 2019.

2. Felix Franc Elfed Aubel, a postgraduate research student born in 1960 was the candidate of the Social Democratic Party (SDP) and represented the SDP–Liberal Alliance. He had contested the same seat in the 1983 general election.

3. Clayton Francis Jones was nominated by Plaid Cymru. He was a 31-year-old coach operator and was a member of Taff-Ely Borough Council and Mid-Glamorgan County Council.

4. James Norwich Arbuthnot, a barrister born in 1952, represented the Conservative Party. He had been a Councillor in the Royal Borough of Kensington and Chelsea since 1978. Arbuthnot contested this constituency in 1983. He became a Conservative MP in 1987 and sat until 2015, when he joined The House of Lords.

5. Mrs Mary Winter represented the Communist Party. She was a senior social services officer with Mid-Glamorgan County Council and was aged 36 at the time of the by-election.

6. Noel Edmundbury Rencontre was an independent candidate, who sought election under the ballot paper label Womble Independent.

7. Paul Nicholls-Jones was an independent candidate.

== Result ==
1984 Cynon Valley by-election
Party	Candidate	Votes	%	±%
Labour	Ann Clwyd	19,389	58.8	+2.8
SDP	Felix Aubel	6,554	19.9	−0.7
Plaid Cymru	Clayton Jones	3,619	11.0	+1.8
Conservative	James Arbuthnot	2,441	7.4	−6.8
Communist	Mary Winter	642	1.9	N/A
Independent	Noel Rencontre	215	0.6	N/A
Independent	Paul Nicholls-Jones	122	0.4	N/A
Majority		12,835	38.9	+3.5
Turnout		32,982	65.7	−7.7
Registered electors		50,237		
Labour hold		Swing		

== See also ==
- Cynon Valley constituency
- Lists of United Kingdom by-elections
- United Kingdom by-election records

== Sources ==
- Britain Votes/Europe Votes By-Election Supplement 1983-, compiled and edited by F.W.S. Craig (Parliamentary Research Services 1985)
