= Beth Winter =

British politician

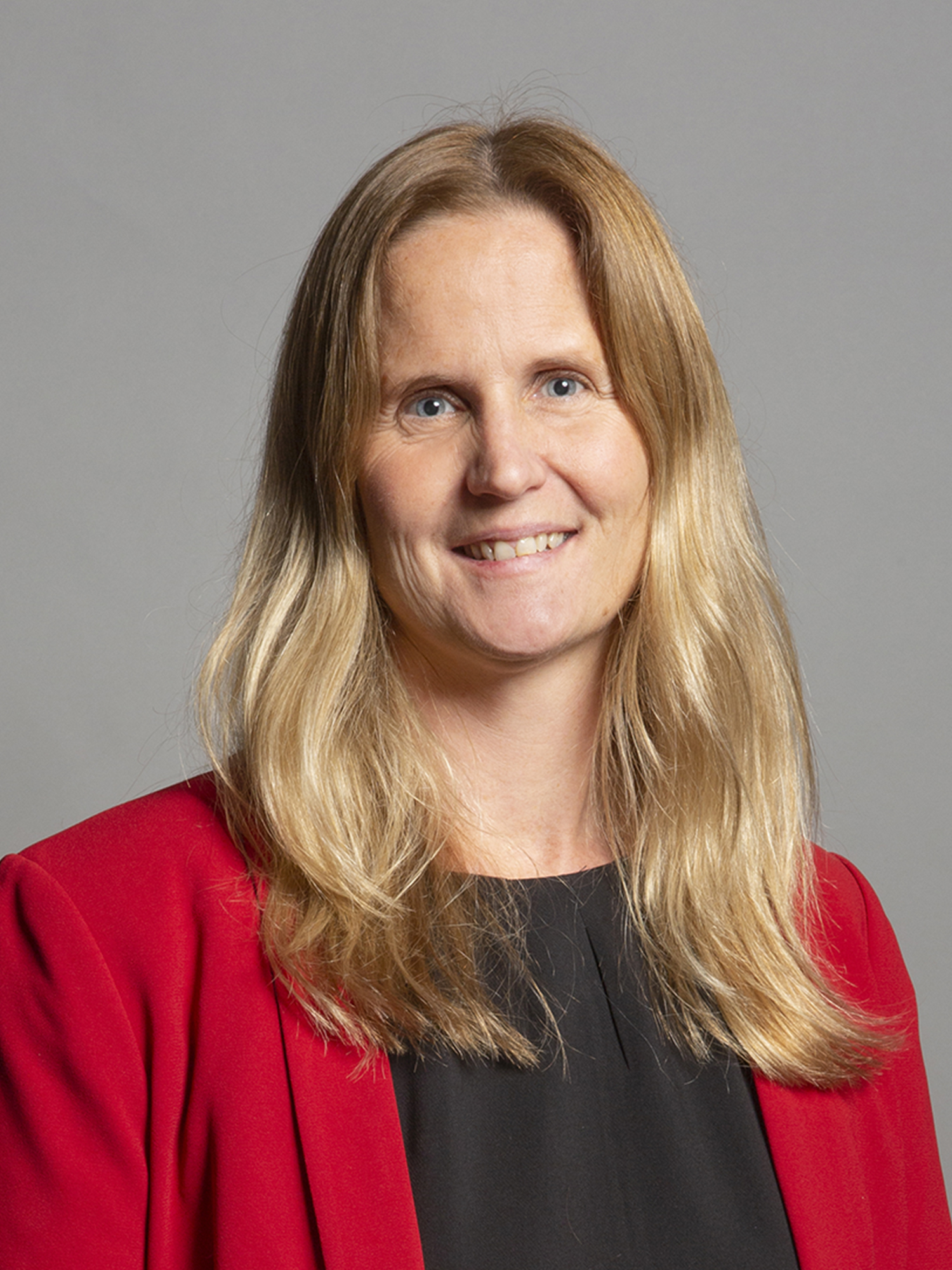
- Official portrait, 2020

Member of Parliament for Cynon Valley
- In office 12 December 2019 – 30 May 2024
- Preceded by: Ann Clwyd
- Succeeded by: Seat abolished

Personal details
- Born: Bethan Winter; 4 October 1974 (age 52)
- Party: Independent (since 2024)
- Other political affiliations: Labour (until 2024); Socialist Campaign Group (2019–2024)
- Education: University of Bristol (BSc, MA); Swansea University (PhD)
- Website: www.bethwinter.wales

Bethan Winter (born 4 October 1974) is a Welsh politician and former member of Welsh Labour, who served as Member of Parliament (MP) for Cynon Valley from 2019 to 2024.

== Early life and education ==
Bethan Winter was born on 4 October 1974 and raised in Cynon Valley. She graduated with a Bachelor of Science in Social Policy and a Master of Arts in Housing Studies, both from the University of Bristol. She later became a researcher and received a PhD from Swansea University in disadvantage among older people in rural communities.

== Career ==
Winter has worked in RCT for Shelter Cymru and in Penywaun as a community worker, and has also managed a youth club and worked in a food bank. She is an official for the University and College Union.

On entering Parliament following the 2019 general election, Winter was appointed Parliamentary Private Secretary to Rachel Reeves as Shadow Chancellor of the Duchy of Lancaster. However, she resigned in September 2020, when she defied the Labour whip and voted against the Overseas Operations Bill alongside 18 other Labour MPs, including two other junior office holders, Nadia Whittome and Olivia Blake.

In February 2022, following the 2022 Russian invasion of Ukraine, Winter was one of 11 Labour MPs who signed a statement by the Stop the War Coalition which questioned the legitimacy of NATO and accused the military alliance of "eastward expansion". All 11 MPs subsequently removed their signatures after the Labour party threatened them with withdrawal of the party whip.

In May 2023, she called the Welsh Labour selection of prospective parliamentary candidates for the 2024 general election "undemocratic". On 7 June 2023, Winter was defeated by Gerald Jones for her party's selection to become the Labour candidate for the new parliamentary seat of Merthyr Tydfil and Upper Cynon, which was contested at the 2024 general election. The seat was ultimately renamed Merthyr Tydfil and Aberdare in the final recommendations published late in June, which also abolished her existing seat.

In November 2024, Winter resigned from the Labour Party. In her statement she said "I cannot in all conscience remain in a political party that is pursuing an authoritarian political agenda whose primary objective is to retain the neoliberal status quo, serve corporate interests and protect the ruling class."

On 24 July 2025, Winter announced her support for the newly formed Your Party, co-founded by left-wing former Labour Party MPs Zarah Sultana and Jeremy Corbyn, in a social media statement alongside Mark Serwotka, former General Secretary of the Public and Commercial Services Union. By July, Winter was described by Nation.Cymru as playing a "key role" in Your Party, being one of three directors of MoU Operations, the entity responsible for handling the data and finances of Your Party, alongside Jamie Driscoll and Andrew Feinstein. Winter and Serwotka "fronted" Your Party in Wales, organising a "mapping exercise", working to establish local branches, and announcing an all-Wales meeting for 25 October 2025 to discuss how Your Party would promote Welsh self-determination and its future political strategy in Wales. This included considering whether to run in the upcoming 2026 Senedd election. Following a public split in Your Party between co-founders Sultana and Corbyn on 18 September, Winter released a statement on social media stating she and Serwotka were "shocked and appalled by the communications coming out of Your Party", promising to continue moving forward with regional organising in Wales.

In October 2025, it was reported that Your Party had launched legal action against the three directors of the MoU, including Winter, after a 'final deadline' to hand over the money accrued by membership fees from Zarah Sultana's aborted membership portal had passed without control being transferred. The MoU, holding around £800,000 worth of membership fees, was originally reported to be the designated body for managing the party's money and data until it was formally registered, at which point it would be handed over to the 'formalised' party. However, despite its registration on 30 September, The Guardian reported that the handover had not occurred. In a statement to The Guardian, Driscoll, Winter and Feinstein said: "These allegations are factually incorrect and frankly nonsense. We will make a full statement when we have time, but none of us are paid politicians with press officers."

On 25 October 2025, Winter and Serwotka led a 250-member 'All-Wales Gathering' of Your Party in Merthyr Tydfil. The attendees were gathered through the party's informal proto-branches, for the central office of Your Party had not yet handed over the membership data to the party's Welsh branch.

In November 2025, it was reported that Winter had registered a new political party, People's Party Wales, with herself as the leader. It was unclear whether this was a wholly new political organisation, or a Welsh branch of Your Party, of which Winter was a co-convenor in Wales. Several days later, the new party was removed from the Electoral Commission register without explanation, and its former registration page began to display an error.

In February 2026, Winter announced that she would be standing as a community independent in the Pontypridd Cynon Merthyr constituency in the 2026 Senedd election. She confirmed that she was no longer a member of Your Party. In the event she achieved a 3.2% vote share and was not elected.

== Political positions ==
She has described herself as a "proud socialist".

She has supported Cymdeithas yr Iaith's campaign to introduce a Property Act, and has supported devolution of the Crown Estate to the Senedd. She has opposed construction of the AUKUS Deep Space Advanced Radar Concept (DARC) at Cawdor Barracks in Pembrokeshire and is an official supporter of the campaign PARC Against DARC which was founded in 2024 to stop it.

In June 2024, although not specifically endorsing Welsh independence, she spoke in a rally in Carmarthen that was in favour of Welsh independence.

== Personal life ==
Winter has three children. Three generations of her family participated in the September 2019 climate strikes at the Senedd building.

Parliament of the United Kingdom
| Preceded by Ann Clwyd | Member of Parliament for Cynon Valley; 2019–2024 | Constituency abolished |
