= Eluned Morgan =

First Minister of Wales from 2024 to 2026

The Right Honourable The Baroness Morgan of Ely PC
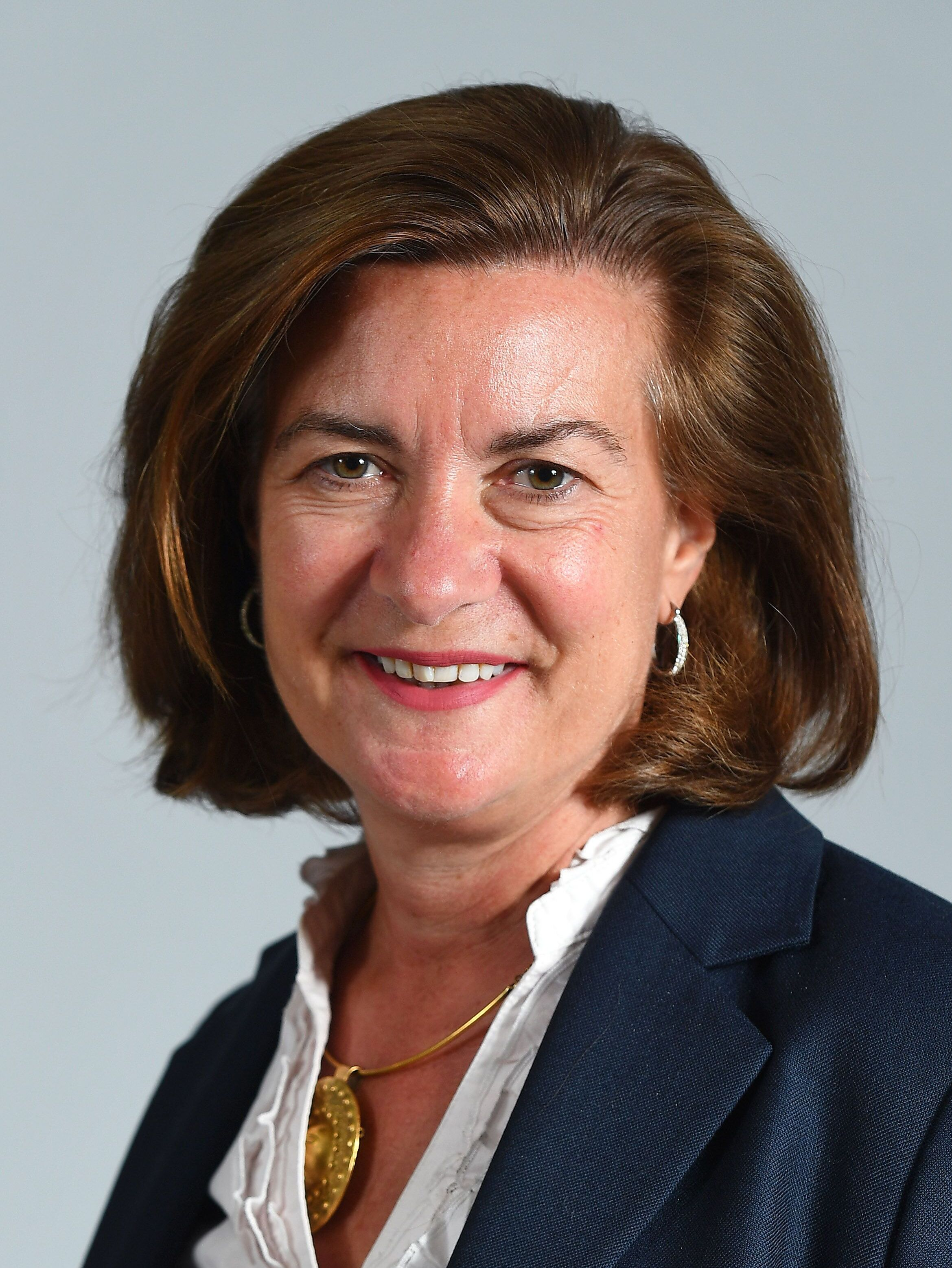
- Official portrait, 2024

First Minister of Wales
- In office 6 August 2024 – 12 May 2026
- Monarch: Charles III
- Deputy: Huw Irranca-Davies
- Preceded by: Vaughan Gething
- Succeeded by: Rhun ap Iorwerth

Leader of Welsh Labour
- In office 24 July 2024 – 8 May 2026
- Deputy: Carolyn Harris
- UK party leader: Keir Starmer
- Preceded by: Vaughan Gething
- Succeeded by: Ken Skates
Ministerial offices
Cabinet Secretary for Health and Social Care (Note: As Minister for Health and Social Services from 2021 to 2024)
In office 13 May 2021 – 6 August 2024
First Minister	Mark Drakeford; Vaughan Gething
Preceded by	Vaughan Gething
Succeeded by	Mark Drakeford
Minister for Mental Health and Wellbeing
In office 8 October 2020 – 13 May 2021
First Minister	Mark Drakeford
Preceded by	Office established
Succeeded by	Lynne Neagle
Minister for the Welsh Language (Note: Deputy Minister for Lifelong Learning and Welsh Language from 3 November 2017 to 13 December 2018; Minister for International Relations and the Welsh Language from 13 December 2018 to 8 October 2020; Welsh Language from 8 October 2020.)
In office 3 November 2017 – 13 May 2021
First Minister	Carwyn Jones; Mark Drakeford
Preceded by	Alun Davies
Succeeded by	Jeremy Miles

Member of the Senedd for Mid and West Wales
- In office 5 May 2016 – 7 April 2026
- Preceded by: Rebecca Evans
- Succeeded by: Constituency abolished

Member of the House of Lords
- Lord Temporal
- Life peerage 26 January 2011

Member of the European Parliament
- In office 9 June 1994 – 4 June 2009
- Preceded by: David Morris
- Succeeded by: John Bufton
- Constituency: Mid and West Wales (1994–1999); Wales (1999–2009)

Personal details
- Born: Mair Eluned Morgan; 16 February 1967 (age 59) Cardiff, Wales
- Party: Labour
- Spouse: Rhys Jenkins (m. 1996)
- Children: 2
- Parent: Bob Morgan (father)
- Education: University of Hull (BA)
- Website: www.elunedmorgan.wales

Mair Eluned Morgan, Baroness Morgan of Ely (born 16 February 1967) is a Welsh politician who served as First Minister of Wales and Leader of Welsh Labour from 2024 to 2026. She was the first woman to serve as FM. She held several positions in the Welsh Cabinet between 2017 and 2024. Morgan has been a life peer in the House of Lords since 2011, and served as Member of the Senedd (MS) from 2016 to 2026. She served as Member of the European Parliament (MEP) from 1994 to 2009.

As Welsh Labour leader and First Minister, Morgan revived Welsh Labour's clear red water strategy used by some of her predecessors, shifting Welsh Labour back to the political left and distancing it from the centrist UK Labour leadership of Keir Starmer, criticising some of the policies implemented by Starmer's government

Having led the party into the 2026 Senedd elections, Morgan lost her seat contesting the Ceredigion Penfro constituency, becoming the first leader of a government in the UK to be unseated while still in office. She subsequently announced that she would stand down as leader of Welsh Labour, initiating the 2026 Welsh Labour leadership election.

== Personal life and education ==
Morgan was born and brought up in Ely, Cardiff, the daughter of Bob Morgan and Elaine Morgan. She was educated at Ysgol Gyfun Gymraeg Glantaf, as well as, through a scholarship, the independent United World College of the Atlantic, and later gained a degree in European Studies from the University of Hull.

Morgan is married to Rhys Jenkins, who is a GP and also a non-stipendiary priest. Morgan's family hails from St Davids in Pembrokeshire.

In March 2022, Morgan was banned from driving for six months following repeated speeding fines. The offence which took her over the 12-point limit was on a 30 mph road in Wrexham.

She has been described as a "committed Christian".

== Professional career and voluntary positions ==
Morgan formerly worked as a researcher for S4C, Agenda TV and the BBC.

After leaving the European Parliament she worked as the Director of National Development for SSE in Wales (SWALEC) from 2009 to June 2013 where she was responsible for establishing the new SWALEC Smart Energy Centre in Treforest. She was appointed Chair of the Cardiff Business Partnership.

Morgan is a Fellow of Trinity College Carmarthen and is an Honorary-Distinguished Professor and Fellow of Cardiff University. She served on the board of the International Baccalaureate Organisation for three years. She was the Chair of the Cardiff Business Partnership. She was a member of the External Advisory Board to the Wales Governance Centre. She served on the Council of Atlantic College. She was Chair of Live Music Now in Wales, a charity which sends talented young musicians to care homes and special schools and demonstrates the transformational impact of music, from 2012 to 2016.

== Political career ==
=== Welsh Labour and Yes for Wales ===
Morgan served on the Welsh Labour Party Executive for ten years and was appointed to the Welsh Assembly Advisory Group, which was responsible for developing the standing orders of the Senedd. She was a founding member of the Yes for Wales cross-party group, which campaigned for the Welsh Assembly to be established.

=== European Parliament ===
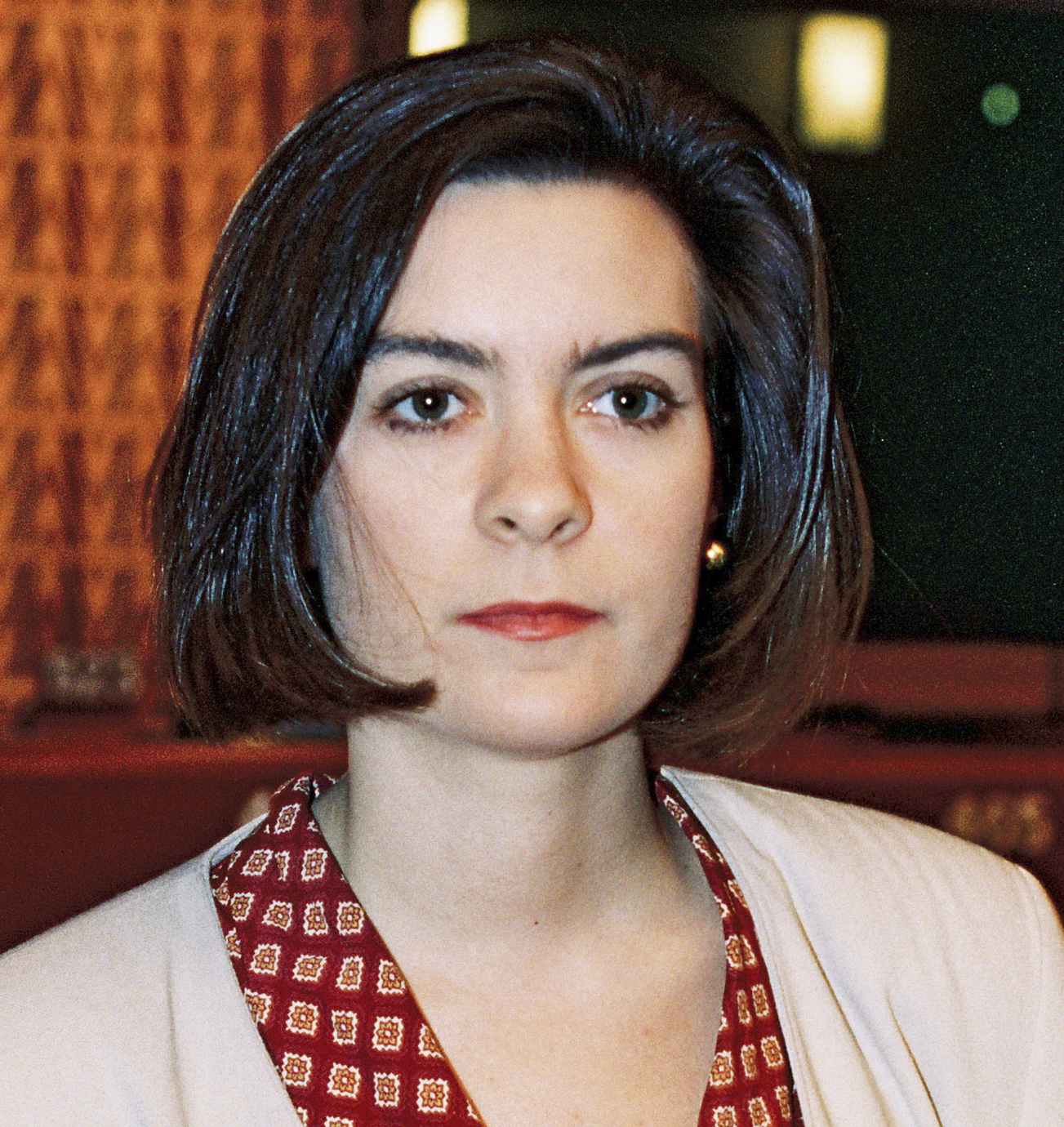
Morgan as an MEP at a meeting of the European Parliament in Strasbourg in 1995

In 1990, Morgan worked as a stagiaire in the European Parliament for the Socialist Group.

In 1994, Morgan was elected as a Member of the European Parliament representing Mid and West Wales. At the time she was the youngest MEP when she took up her seat, aged 27. She continued as an MEP representing the Wales constituency, being elected at both the 1999 and 2004 elections, before standing down at the 2009 elections.

Morgan served as the budget control spokesperson for the 180 strong Socialist Group. She was also the Labour Party's European spokesperson on Energy, Industry and Science. She was responsible for drafting the European Parliament's response to the Energy Green Paper and also took the lead role in negotiating on behalf of the Parliament the revision of the Electricity Directive.

=== House of Lords ===
On 19 November 2010 it was announced that Morgan had been granted a life peerage and would sit on the Labour benches of the House of Lords, and was gazetted on 27 January 2011 as Baroness Morgan of Ely, in the City of Cardiff. From 2013–2016, Morgan served as the Shadow Minister for Wales in the House of Lords, and from 2014 to 2016 she served as Shadow Minister for Foreign Affairs and also as a whip. She was responsible for leading for Labour in the House of Lords on the EU Referendum Bill and led for Labour on two Wales Bills.

Morgan is currently on a leave of absence from the House of Lords, and has been since 2017. In 2018, Morgan stated that if she were to become First Minister, she would renounce her peerage. In 2024, when Morgan became First Minister, she instead stated she wanted to 'pause' her peerage, and 'have that opportunity if necessary to think about what happens in the future.'

=== Senedd and Welsh Government ===
A video of Morgan taking the daily COVID-19 press conference in November 2020

In 2015 Morgan was selected as a candidate for the 2016 Welsh election on the Mid and West Wales regional list. On 5 May 2016 she was elected from the regional list as an Assembly Member in the Senedd.

In November 2017 she was appointed Minister for Welsh Language and Lifelong Learning. She contested the 2018 Welsh Labour leadership election, but was not successful, coming third. She was then appointed by First Minister Mark Drakeford as Minister for International Relations and the Welsh Language in December 2018 before being moved to Minister for Mental Health, Wellbeing and the Welsh Language in October 2020.

Morgan was re-elected at the 2021 Senedd election, and a week later was appointed Minister for Health and Social Services. In March 2023, the Welsh Conservatives submitted a motion of no confidence in her, following mounting criticism of Morgan's handling of the Betsi Cadwaladr crisis. The motion was defeated, with 26 votes in favour and 29 against.

Morgan endorsed Vaughan Gething in the February–March 2024 Welsh Labour leadership election. She retained her role as Cabinet Secretary for Health and Social Care in the Gething government.

==== Leader of Welsh Labour ====
In July 2024, Morgan announced that she would be standing in the July 2024 Welsh Labour leadership election on a unity ticket with Huw Irranca-Davies, who would serve as her deputy First Minister if she was elected leader. On 24 July 2024, she was confirmed to be the only candidate that met the five–nomination threshold, and was therefore elected as leader of Welsh Labour.

=== First Minister of Wales (2024–2026) ===
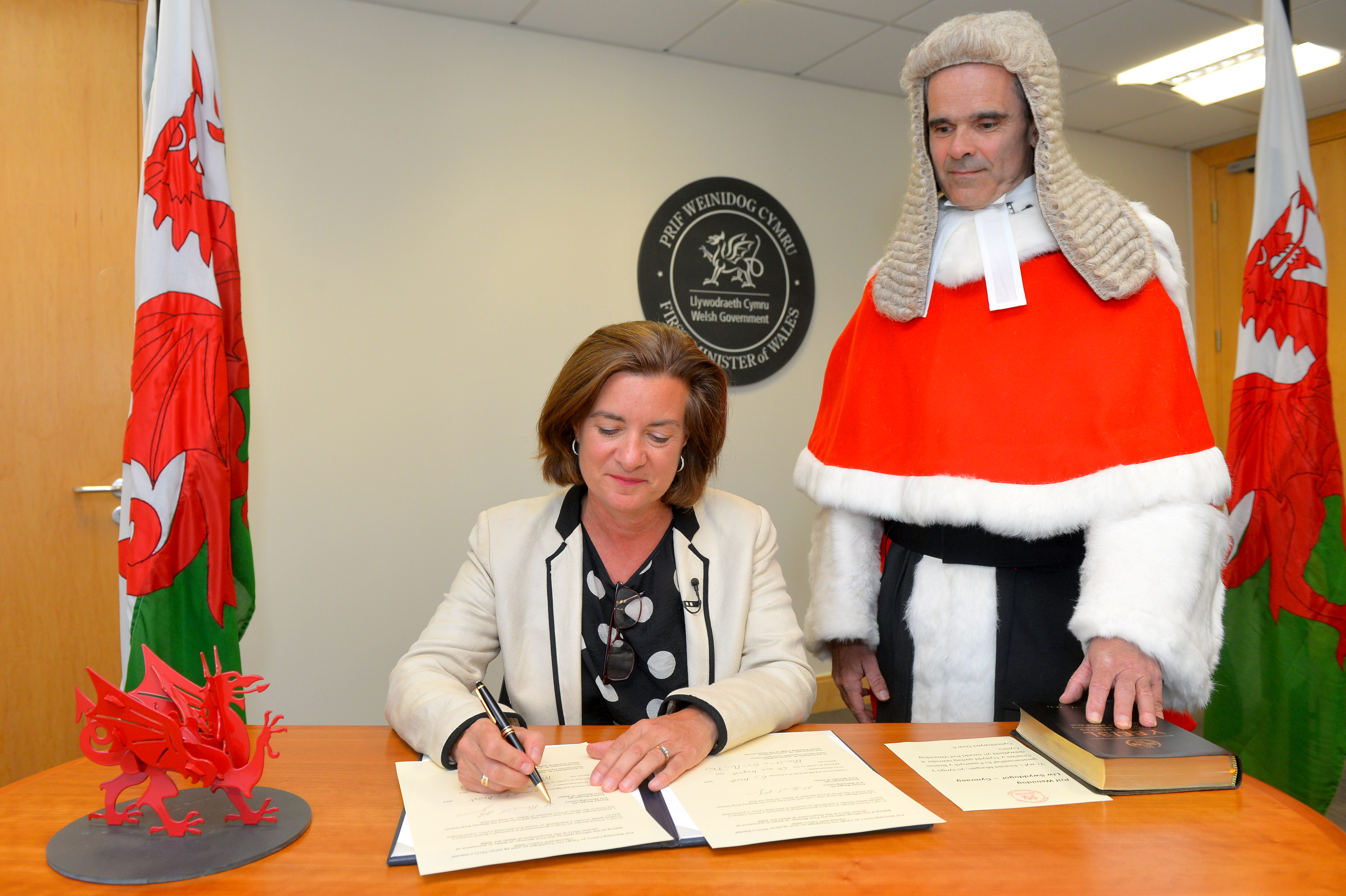
Morgan being sworn in as First Minister on 6 August 2024

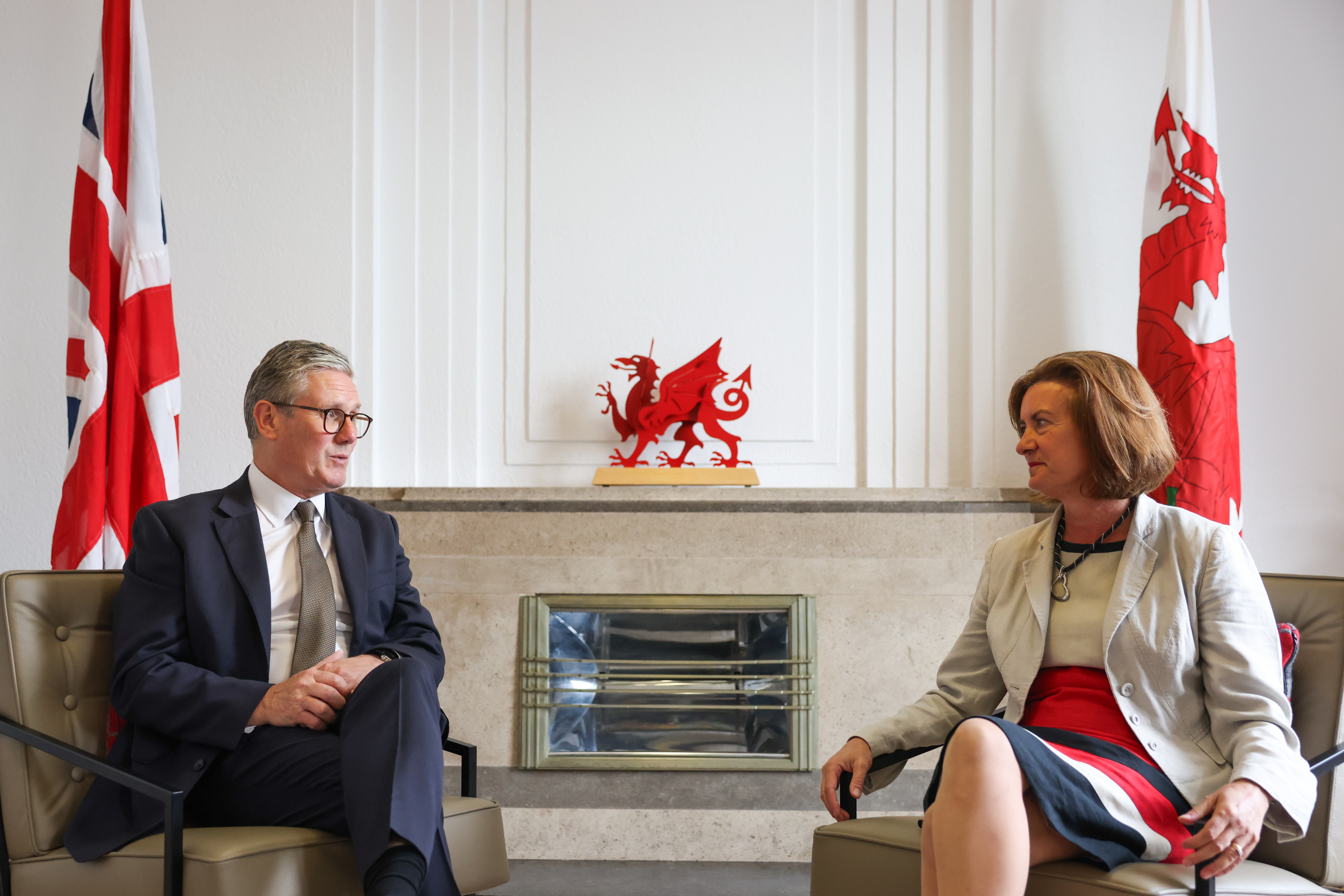
Morgan meeting Prime Minister Keir Starmer in Cardiff

On 6 August 2024, Morgan was officially sworn in as the First Minister of Wales, following her nomination by the Senedd, which was recalled from its summer recess for this purpose. As the leader of the largest party in the Senedd, Morgan secured the position with 28 votes, marking the beginning of her tenure as Wales' first female First Minister.

Upon entering government as the First Minister, one of the first issues to face Morgan was the prospect of the 2024 United Kingdom riots beginning in Wales. In a statement, Morgan said that she was "not complacent", further adding that Wales was a "society and a nation that should be welcoming people... we cannot let those people who are determined to be destructive within our communities to get a hold".

Shortly after taking office, Morgan met with Prime Minister Keir Starmer in Cardiff during his visit to Wales. The meeting focused on "resetting the relationship" between the UK and Welsh governments. Key topics included NHS funding, energy independence, and the future of Tata Steel jobs in Wales. They also discussed the development of renewable energy through the Welsh Government's initiative, Trydan Gwyrdd Cymru, aimed at producing clean energy and creating skilled jobs in Wales.

On 2 October 2024, she was sworn into the Privy Council.

==== 2026 election ====
In the 2026 Senedd election, she was a candidate in the Ceredigion Penfro constituency. She was also the lead candidate on the party list. Eluned Morgan was alleged to have intervened in the controversial Labour selection in Cardiff, after would-be candidate Owain Williams was initially ruled out on an administrative issue. On 23 April, she admitted that she was at risk of losing her seat in a "knife edge election".

On 8 May 2026, Morgan lost her seat in the Senedd and she subsequently resigned as leader of Welsh Labour with immediate effect, which triggered the 2026 Welsh Labour leadership election.

== Notes ==
European Parliament
Preceded by David Morris	Member of the European Parliament for Mid and West Wales; 1994–1999	Constituency abolished
New constituency	Member of the European Parliament for Wales; 1999–2009	Succeeded by John Bufton
Senedd
Preceded by Rebecca Evans	Member of the Senedd for Mid and West Wales; 2016–2026	Succeeded by Constituency abolished
Political offices
Preceded by Vaughan Gething	First Minister of Wales; 2024–2026	Succeeded by Rhun ap Iorwerth
Party political offices
Preceded by Vaughan Gething	Leader of Welsh Labour; 2024–2026	Succeeded by Ken Skates (interim)
