= North Wales (European Parliament constituency) =

Former European Parliament constituency

- European Parliament constituency
- Boundary within Wales (1979-1984)
- Member state: United Kingdom
- Created: 1979
- Dissolved: 1999
- MEPs: 1

Boundary within Wales (1984-1994)

Boundary within Wales (1994-1999)

North Wales was a European Parliament constituency which roughly covered the geographic region of North Wales, from 1979 until 1999. It was held by the Conservative Party from 1979 until 1989, during which time it was their only seat in Wales.

Prior to its uniform adoption of proportional representation in 1999, the United Kingdom used first-past-the-post for the European elections in England, Scotland and Wales. The European Parliament constituencies used under that system were smaller than the later regional constituencies and only had one Member of the European Parliament each.

The seat became part of the much larger Wales constituency in 1999.

== Boundaries ==
1979–1984: Anglesey, Caernarfon, Conwy, Denbigh, Flintshire East, Flintshire West, Merionnydd, Montgomery, Wrexham.

1984–1994: Alyn and Deeside, Caernarfon, Clwyd North West, Clwyd South West, Conwy, Delyn, Meirionnydd Nant Conwy, Montgomery, Wrexham, Ynys Mon.

1994–1999: Alyn and Deeside, Caernarfon, Clwyd North West, Clwyd South West, Conwy, Delyn, Wrexham, Ynys Mon.

== Members of the European Parliament ==
Elected	Name	Party
1979	Beata Brookes	Conservative
1989	Joe Wilson	Labour

== Results ==
European Parliament election, 1979: North Wales
Party	Candidate	Votes	%	±%
Conservative	Beata Brookes	71,473	41.9	
Labour	T. A. Dillon	46,627	26.4	
Plaid Cymru	Ieuan Wyn Jones	34,171	19.3	
Liberal	Nesta Wyn Ellis	21,989	12.4	
Majority		27,546	15.5	
Turnout		174,260	35.9	
Conservative win (new seat)				

European Parliament election, 1984: North Wales
Party	Candidate	Votes	%	±%
Conservative	Beata Brookes	69,139	31.6	−10.3
SDP	Robert Thomas Ellis	56,861	26.0	+13.6
Labour	Colin Ian Campbell	54,768	25.0	−1.4
Plaid Cymru	Dafydd Iwan	38,117	17.4	−1.9
Majority		12,278	5.6	−9.9
Turnout		218,885	42.4	+6.5
Conservative hold		Swing		

European Parliament election, 1989: North Wales
Party	Candidate	Votes	%	±%
Labour	Joe Wilson	83,638	33.1	+8.1
Conservative	Beata Brookes	79,178	31.3	−0.3
Plaid Cymru	Dafydd Elis-Thomas	64,120	25.3	+7.9
Green	Patrick H. W. Adams	15,832	6.3	New
SLD	R. K. (Keith) Marshall	10,056	4.0	−22.0
Majority		4,460	1.8	−3.8
Turnout		252,824	46.8	+4.4
Labour gain from Conservative		Swing		

European Parliament election, 1994: North Wales
Party	Candidate	Votes	%	±%
Labour	Joe Wilson	88,091	40.8	+7.7
Plaid Cymru	Dafydd Wigley	72,849	33.8	+8.5
Conservative	Glyn Mon Hughes	33,450	15.5	−15.8
Liberal Democrats	Ruth E. Parry	14,828	6.9	+2.9
Green	Patrick H. W. Adams	2,850	1.3	−5.0
Natural Law	David E. Hughes	2,065	0.9	New
Independent	J. M. (Maxwell) Cooksey	1,623	0.8	New
Majority		15,242	7.0	+5.2
Turnout		215,756	45.3	−1.5
Labour hold		Swing		
