= John Bufton =

British politician (born 1962)

John Andreas Bufton
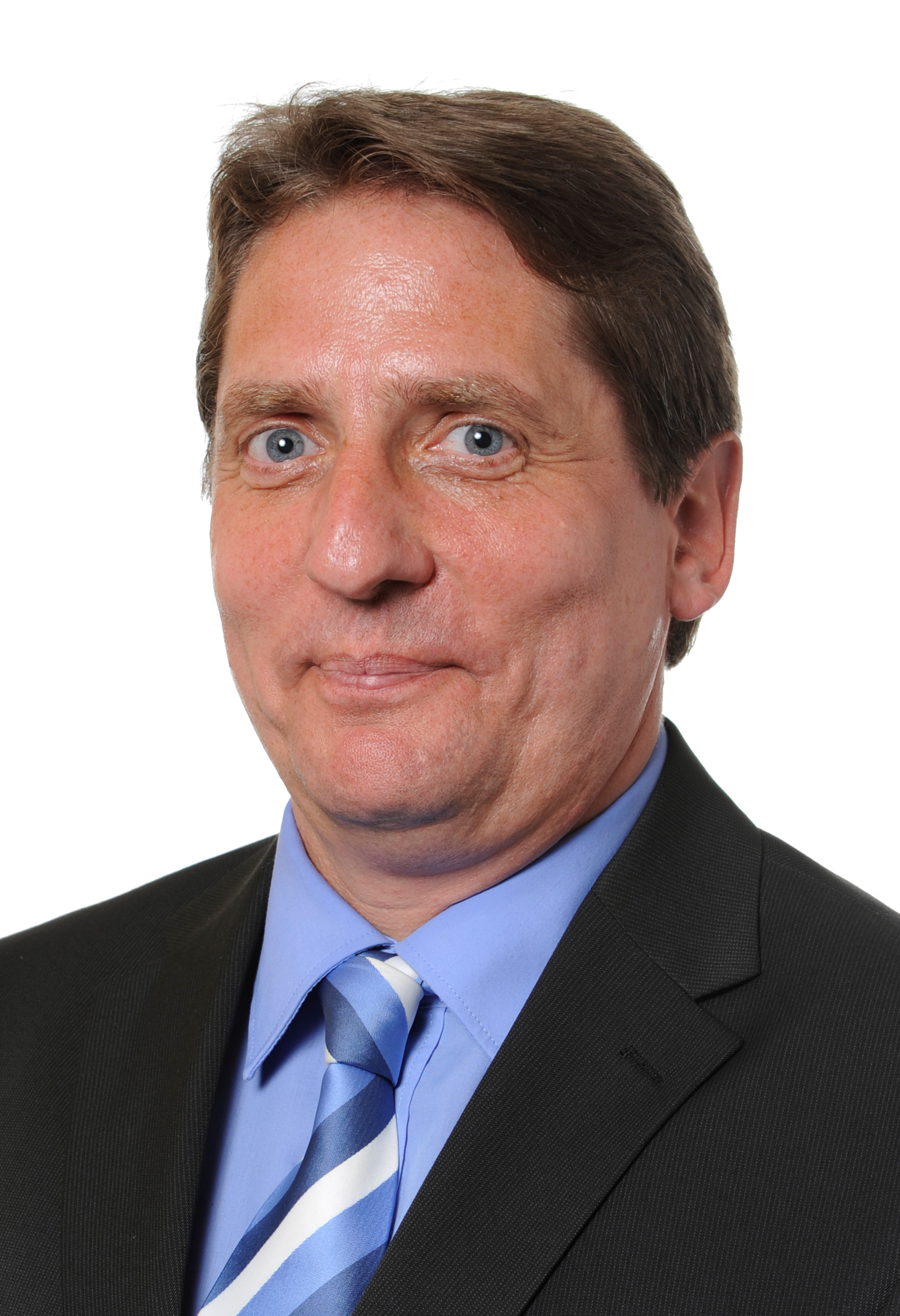

Member of the European Parliament for Wales
- In office 8 June 2009 – 2 July 2014
- Preceded by: Eluned Morgan
- Succeeded by: Nathan Gill

Personal details
- Born: 31 August 1962 (age 63) Llanidloes, Montgomeryshire, Wales
- Party: UK Independence Party
- Other political affiliations: Independent; Referendum Party (1997)

John Andreas Bufton (born 31 August 1962 in Llanidloes) is a British former politician who was a UK Independence Party (UKIP) Member of the European Parliament (MEP) for Wales, from 2009 to 2014, when he stood down.

== Early life ==
Bufton was educated at Elan Village Primary School and Llandrindod Wells High School, and joined the family haulage business before embarking on a career managing a residential care home for the elderly with the local authority.

== Political career ==
Bufton's political career began when he was elected onto Rhayader Town Council in 1987. In 1995, he was elected to Powys County Council. In the 1997 General Election, he ran for the Referendum Party in the Montgomeryshire constituency.

In 2000, he ran as UKIP candidate in the Ceredigion by-election, coming fifth with 1.9% of the vote. He also ran for UKIP in the 2005 General Election, 2007 Welsh Assembly Elections and 2008 Powys County Council election.

In 2009, Bufton became UKIP's first MEP for Wales, picking up the fourth available seat from Labour. Bufton was appointed to serve on the Committee on Regional Development, at the European Parliament. In May 2013, Bufton announced his intention to stand down at the following European elections. He was replaced by Nathan Gill.
