= Cynon Valley (UK Parliament constituency) =

UK Parliament constituency (1983–2024)

Coordinates: 51.657°N 3.461°W

- Former county constituency for the House of Commons
- Boundary of Cynon Valley in Wales
- Preserved county: Mid Glamorgan
- Electorate: 52,372 (December 2010)
- Major settlements: Aberdare, Mountain Ash, Hirwaun

1983–2024
- Seats: One
- Created from: Aberdare and parts of Brecon and Radnor and Neath
- Senedd: Cynon Valley, South Wales Central

Cynon Valley (Welsh: Cwm Cynon) was a constituency (Note: A borough constituency (for the purposes of election expenses and type of returning officer)) in Wales, of the House of Commons of the UK Parliament from 1983 to 2024. Its last MP from 2019 to 2024 was Beth Winter of the Labour Party. (Note: As with all constituencies, the constituency elected one Member of Parliament (MP) by the first past the post system of election at least every five years.)

The Cynon Valley Senedd constituency was created with the same boundaries in 1999 (as an Assembly constituency).

The constituency was abolished as part of the 2023 periodic review of Westminster constituencies and under the June 2023 final recommendations of the Boundary Commission for Wales. Its wards were split between Merthyr Tydfil and Aberdare, and Pontypridd.

== Boundaries ==
Map of boundaries 2010–2024

1983–2010: The Borough of Cynon Valley.

2010–2024: The Rhondda Cynon Taff County Borough electoral divisions of Aberaman North, Aberaman South, Abercynon, Aberdare East, Aberdare West/Llwydcoed, Cilfynydd, Cwmbach, Glyncoch, Hirwaun, Mountain Ash East, Mountain Ash West, Penrhiwceiber, Pen-y-waun, Rhigos, and Ynysybwl.

The constituency encompasses the towns of Aberdare, Mountain Ash, Cilfynydd, Abercynon and Hirwaun.

== Members of Parliament ==
Election	Member	Party
1983	Ioan Evans	Labour Co-op
1984 by-election	Ann Clwyd	Labour
2019	Beth Winter	Labour
2024	Constituency abolished	

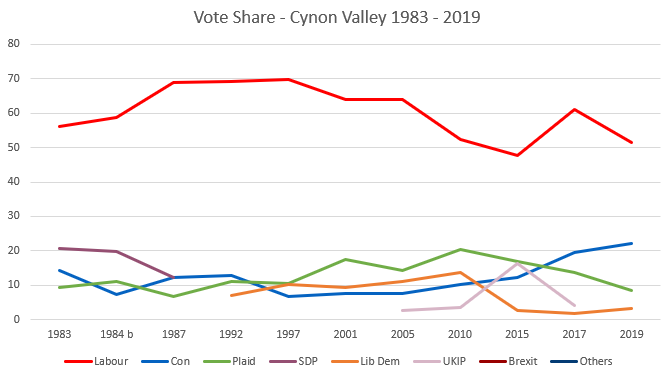

== Elections ==
=== Elections in the 1980s ===
General election 1983: Cynon Valley
Party	Candidate	Votes	%	±%
Labour Co-op	Ioan Evans	20,668	56.0	N/A
SDP	Felix Aubel	7,594	20.6	N/A
Conservative	James Arbuthnot	5,240	14.2	N/A
Plaid Cymru	Pauline Jarman	3,421	9.3	N/A
Majority		13,074	35.4	N/A
Turnout		36,923	73.4	N/A
Registered electors		50,284		
Labour Co-op win (new seat)				

1984 Cynon Valley by-election
Party	Candidate	Votes	%	±%
Labour	Ann Clwyd	19,389	58.8	+2.8
SDP	Felix Aubel	6,554	19.9	−0.7
Plaid Cymru	Clayton F. Jones	3,619	11.0	+1.8
Conservative	James Arbuthnot	2,441	7.4	−6.8
Communist	Mary Winter	642	1.9	N/A
Independent	Noel E. Rencontre	215	0.6	N/A
Independent	Paul Nicholls-Jones	122	0.4	N/A
Majority		12,835	38.9	+3.5
Turnout		32,982	65.7	−7.7
Registered electors		50,237		
Labour hold		Swing		

General election 1987: Cynon Valley
Party	Candidate	Votes	%	±%
Labour	Ann Clwyd	26,222	68.9	+12.9
SDP	Keith Butler	4,651	12.2	−8.4
Conservative	Mark Bishop	4,638	12.2	−2.0
Plaid Cymru	Dorothy Richards	2,549	6.7	−2.6
Majority		21,571	56.7	+21.3
Turnout		38,060	76.7	+3.3
Registered electors		49,621		
Labour hold		Swing		

=== Elections in the 1990s ===
General election 1992: Cynon Valley
Party	Candidate	Votes	%	±%
Labour	Ann Clwyd	26,254	69.1	+0.2
Conservative	Andrew Smith	4,890	12.9	+0.7
Plaid Cymru	Clifford Benney	4,186	11.0	+4.3
Liberal Democrats	Marcello Verma	2,667	7.0	−5.2
Majority		21,364	56.2	−0.5
Turnout		37,997	76.5	−0.2
Registered electors		49,695		
Labour hold		Swing	−0.2	

General election 1997: Cynon Valley
Party	Candidate	Votes	%	±%
Labour	Ann Clwyd	23,307	69.7	+0.6
Plaid Cymru	Alun Davies	3,552	10.6	−0.4
Liberal Democrats	Huw Price	3,459	10.3	+3.3
Conservative	Andrew Smith	2,260	6.8	−6.1
Referendum	Gwyn John	844	2.5	N/A
Majority		19,755	59.1	+2.9
Turnout		33,422	69.2	−7.3
Registered electors		48,286		
Labour hold		Swing	+0.5	

=== Elections in the 2000s ===
General election 2001: Cynon Valley
Party	Candidate	Votes	%	±%
Labour	Ann Clwyd	17,685	65.6	−4.1
Plaid Cymru	Steven J. Cornelius	4,687	17.4	+6.8
Liberal Democrats	Ian Parry	2,541	9.4	−0.9
Conservative	Julian Waters	2,045	7.6	+0.8
Majority		12,998	48.2	−10.9
Turnout		26,958	55.4	−13.8
Registered electors		48,639		
Labour hold		Swing	−5.4	

General election 2005: Cynon Valley
Party	Candidate	Votes	%	±%
Labour	Ann Clwyd	17,074	64.1	−1.5
Plaid Cymru	Geraint Benney	3,815	14.3	−3.1
Liberal Democrats	Margaret Phelps	2,991	11.2	+1.8
Conservative	Antonia Dunn	2,062	7.7	+0.1
UKIP	Sue Davies	705	2.6	N/A
Majority		13,259	49.8	+1.6
Turnout		26,647	58.7	+3.3
Registered electors		44,803		
Labour hold		Swing	+0.8	

=== Elections in the 2010s ===
General election 2010: Cynon Valley
Party	Candidate	Votes	%	±%
Labour	Ann Clwyd	15,681	52.5	−10.5
Plaid Cymru	Dafydd Trystan Davies	6,064	20.3	+6.8
Liberal Democrats	Lee Thacker	4,120	13.8	+1.6
Conservative	Juliette Ash	3,010	10.1	+2.1
UKIP	Frank Hughes	1,001	3.4	+0.7
Majority		9,617	32.2	−17.6
Turnout		29,876	59.0	−1.3
Registered electors		50,650		
Labour hold		Swing	−8.6	

General election 2015: Cynon Valley
Party	Candidate	Votes	%	±%
Labour	Ann Clwyd	14,532	47.7	−4.8
Plaid Cymru	Cerith Griffiths	5,126	16.8	−3.5
UKIP	Rebecca Rees-Evans	4,976	16.3	+12.9
Conservative	Keith Dewhurst	3,676	12.1	+2.0
Liberal Democrats	Angharad Jones	830	2.7	−11.1
Green	John Matthews	799	2.6	N/A
Socialist Labour	Chris Beggs	533	1.7	N/A
Rejected ballots		81		
Majority		9,406	30.9	−1.3
Turnout		30,472	59.3	+0.3
Registered electors		51,422		
Labour hold		Swing	−0.6	

Of the 81 rejected ballots:

- 59 were either unmarked or it was uncertain who the vote was for.
- 22 voted for more than one candidate.

General election 2017: Cynon Valley
Party	Candidate	Votes	%	±%
Labour	Ann Clwyd	19,404	61.0	+13.3
Conservative	Keith Dewhurst	6,166	19.4	+7.3
Plaid Cymru	Liz Walters	4,376	13.8	−3.0
UKIP	Ian McLean	1,271	4.0	−12.3
Liberal Democrats	Nicola Knight	585	1.8	−0.9
Majority		13,238	41.6	+11.7
Turnout		31,802	62.0	+2.7
Registered electors		51,334		
Labour hold		Swing	+3.0	

General election 2019: Cynon Valley
Party	Candidate	Votes	%	±%
Labour	Beth Winter	15,533	51.4	−9.6
Conservative	Pauline Church	6,711	22.2	+2.8
Brexit Party	Rebecca Rees-Evans	3,045	10.1	N/A
Plaid Cymru	Geraint Benney	2,562	8.5	−5.3
Cynon Valley	Andrew Chainey	1,322	4.4	N/A
Liberal Democrats	Steve Bray	949	3.1	+1.3
SDP	Ian McLean	114	0.4	N/A
Majority		8,822	29.2	−12.4
Turnout		30,236	59.1	−2.9
Registered electors		51,134		
Labour hold		Swing	-6.2	

== See also ==
- Cynon Valley (Senedd constituency)
- 1984 Cynon Valley by-election
- List of parliamentary constituencies in Mid Glamorgan
- List of parliamentary constituencies in Wales
