= Eurig Wyn =

Welsh politician (1944–2019)

- Official portrait, 1999

Member of the European Parliament
- In office 10 June 1999 – 10 June 2004
- Constituency: Wales

Member of Gwynedd Council
- In office 3 May 2012 – June 2016
- Ward: Waunfawr
- Preceded by: Gwilym Williams
- Succeeded by: Edgar Owen

Personal details
- Born: 10 October 1944 Hermon, Pembrokeshire
- Died: 25 June 2019 (aged 74) Waunfawr, Gwynedd
- Party: Plaid Cymru
- Other political affiliations: Greens–European Free Alliance (1999–2004)
- Children: 2
- Relatives: Llŷr and Rhys Ifans (nephews); Gareth Miles (brother-in-law)

Eurig Wyn (10 October 1944 – 25 June 2019) was a Welsh Plaid Cymru politician who served as a member of the European Parliament (MEP) for Wales from 1999 to 2004. He served as a member of Gwynedd Council for Waunfawr from 2012 to 2016.

== Early life and career ==
Wyn was born in Hermon, Pembrokeshire on 10 October 1944. He attended and studied at Aberystwyth College, before moving to Cardiff where he worked in teaching for three years. He said in 2001, that he had taught rugby union player Danny Wilson.

While in Cardiff, Wyn began working as a journalist for BBC Cymru Wales, and was a reporter for the Welsh language news programme Heddiw. He performed in the first Welsh rock opera, Nia Ben Aur. Wyn eventually became an organizer for Plaid Cymru.

== Political career ==
In the 2005 general election, Wyn unsuccessfully ran as the Plaid candidate for Ynys Môn. He came second, receiving 11,036 votes (31.1%), and was not elected, defeated by Labour candidate Albert Owen.

In the 2012 Gwynedd Council election, Wyn was elected as a councillor for the Waunfawr ward and served until his retirement in June 2016. He was the chairman of the council social services committee, and also a community councillor in Waunfawr.

=== Member of the European Parliament (1999–2004) ===
In the 1999 European Parliament election, Wyn was elected alongside Jill Evans as a Plaid Member of the European Parliament (MEP) for Wales, and he served until 2004. He was a member of the Greens–European Free Alliance political group.

During the 2001 foot-and-mouth outbreak in the United Kingdom, Wyn became a prominent advocate for the Welsh agriculture industry.

In May 2002, as part of a peace mission to the Middle East, Wyn was among a delegation, alongside Jill Evans and AM Geraint Davies, which met with Yasser Arafat, president of the Palestinian National Authority, in Ramallah, West Bank, Palestine.

Wyn was a member of the European Parliament committees on culture, education, petitions and the regions. He was also a member of the delegation for relations with South Africa and the EU-Czech Republic joint parliamentary committee. He supported the introduction of the euro.

== Electoral history ==
Election	Seat	Party	Votes	Percentage (%)	Result	Source
European Parliament, 1999	Wales	Plaid Cymru	185,235	1.9	Elected	
General election, 2005	Ynys Môn	Plaid Cymru	11,036	31.1	Not elected	
Gwynedd Council, 2012	Waunfawr	Plaid Cymru	388	56.89	Elected	

== Personal life and death ==
Wyn was married to his wife Gillian, they had a son, a daughter and four grandchildren. He was the uncle of actors Llŷr and Rhys Ifans, and the brother-in-law of actor Gareth Miles. Wyn died on 25 June 2019, at the age of 74, at his home in Waunfawr, Gwynedd, following a short illness. He lived with Parkinson's disease and had been taken to Royal Stoke University Hospital and Ysbyty Gwynedd in the three weeks prior to his death.

Leader of Plaid Cymru Adam Price said Wyn served his nation with distinction throughout his life and that he would be remembered for his advocacy, describing him as a "calm but firm voice". Jill Evans referred to Wyn following his death as "such a good man" who was "never afraid to speak up when he happened upon injustice" and "never afraid to intervene when he thought things should be done differently". Former president of Plaid Cymru Dafydd Iwan and leader of Gwynedd Council Dyfrig Siencyn also gave tribute.

== See also ==
- List of members of the European Parliament for the United Kingdom (1999–2004)
- List of Welsh-speaking politicians
