= Ann Clwyd =

Welsh Labour politician (1937–2023)

The Right Honourable Ann Clwyd
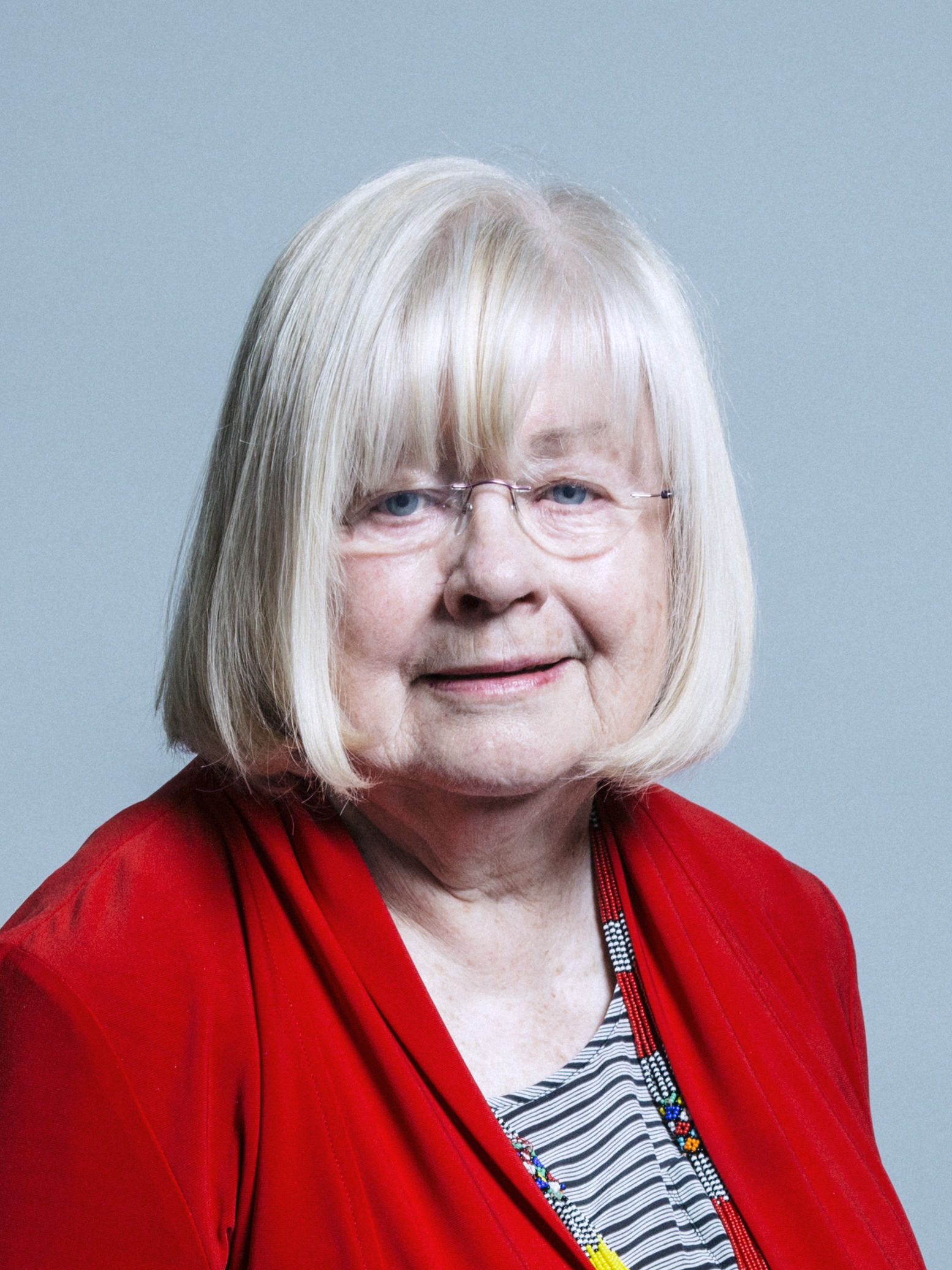
- Official portrait, 2017

Chair of the Parliamentary Labour Party
- In office 24 May 2005 – 5 December 2006
- Leader: Tony Blair
- Preceded by: Jean Corston
- Succeeded by: Tony Lloyd

Shadow Secretary of State for National Heritage
- In office 29 September 1992 – 21 October 1993
- Leader: John Smith
- Preceded by: Bryan Gould
- Succeeded by: Mo Mowlam

Shadow Secretary of State for Wales
- In office 18 July 1992 – 1 November 1992
- Leader: John Smith
- Preceded by: Barry Jones
- Succeeded by: Ron Davies

Shadow Minister for Overseas Development
- In office 2 November 1989 – 18 July 1992
- Leader: Neil Kinnock
- Preceded by: Guy Barnett
- Succeeded by: Michael Meacher

Member of Parliament for Cynon Valley
- In office 3 May 1984 – 6 November 2019
- Preceded by: Ioan Evans
- Succeeded by: Beth Winter

Member of the European Parliament for Mid and West Wales
- In office 7 June 1979 – 14 June 1984
- Preceded by: Office created
- Succeeded by: David Morris

Personal details
- Born: 21 March 1937 Halkyn, Flintshire, Wales
- Died: 21 July 2023 (aged 86) Cardiff, Wales
- Party: Welsh Labour
- Spouse: Owen Roberts (m. 1963; died 2012)
- Education: Bangor University
- Website: Welsh Labour

Ann Clwyd Roberts (/ˈkluːɪd/ KLOO-id, Welsh: [ˈklʊɨd]; née Ann Clwyd Lewis; 21 March 1937 – 21 July 2023) was a Welsh Labour politician who served as Member of Parliament (MP) for Cynon Valley for 35 years, from 1984 until 2019. Although she had intended to stand down in 2015, she was re-elected in that year's general election and in 2017 before standing down in 2019. Clwyd is the longest-serving female MP for a Welsh constituency.

== Early life ==
Ann Clwyd was born in Halkyn, Flintshire, in 1937, the daughter of Gwilym Henri Lewis and Elizabeth Ann Lewis, born and brought up in Pentre Halkyn, Flintshire. She was educated at Halkyn Primary School, Holywell Grammar School and the Queen's School, Chester, before graduating from the University of Wales, Bangor.

== Early career ==
Clwyd was a student teacher at Hope School in Flintshire, before training as a journalist. She then worked for BBC Wales as a studio manager, and then became Welsh correspondent for the Guardian and Observer newspapers during 1964–79.

She was vice-chair of the Arts Council of Wales from 1975 to 1979. She was a member of the National Union of Journalists and Transport and General Workers' Union.

== Parliamentary career ==
Clwyd was persuaded to stand for Parliament by Huw T. Edwards, who felt that there should be more women in parliament. She was the unsuccessful Labour candidate in Denbigh in 1970 and Gloucester in October 1974.

From 1979 to 1984, Clwyd was the Member of the European Parliament (MEP) for Mid and West Wales. She was elected to Parliament in a by-election in May 1984 following the death of Ioan Evans, and became the first woman to sit for a Welsh valleys constituency. Her election came in the midst of the biggest industrial dispute since 1926, which was the 1984-85 coal miners' strike, in one of the mining constituencies most deeply affected. On her maiden speech on 7 June 1984, on the subject of the strike, she opened her remarks by saying "I am the new Member for Cynon Valley and will be the Member for a long time". This prediction bore out correctly as she would serve the constituency for 35 years, and is one of the longest-serving MPs in recent history. Clwyd served as Shadow Minister of Education and Women's Rights from 1987, but was sacked in 1988 for rebelling against the party whip on further spending on nuclear weapons. She returned as Shadow Minister for Overseas Development from 1989 to 1992, and then served as Shadow Secretary of State for Wales in 1992 and for National Heritage from 1992 to 1993.

In January 1993, Clwyd was rebuked by the Speaker of the House of Commons Betty Boothroyd for parking her car in Speaker's Court, without permission. This culminated in Boothroyd threatening to have Clwyd's car clamped if she did it in future whereupon Clwyd desisted.

Clwyd was the Opposition Spokesperson for Employment from 1993 to 1994, and for Foreign Affairs from 1994 to 1995, when she was again sacked, along with Jim Cousins, for observing the Turkish invasion of Iraqi Kirkuk without permission. In 1994 she staged a sit-in down Tower Colliery in her constituency to protest at its closure. She was a member of the International Development Select Committee from 1997 to 2005. On 9 August 2004, she became a member of the Privy Council.

Clwyd was a vice-chair of the Parliamentary Labour Party from 2001 until 2005, and was elected as chair by 167 to 156 (beating Tony Lloyd) on 24 May 2005. However, on 5 December 2006 she was defeated by Lloyd by 11 votes when she sought re-election, with her closeness to Tony Blair being cited as a reason for her defeat.

During her parliamentary career, Clwyd served as Chair of the All Party Parliamentary Human Rights Group and the All Party Parliamentary Iraq Group. She was vice-chair of the All-Party Parliamentary Group on Coalfield Communities, and Secretary of the All-Party Parliamentary Group on Cambodia. She was a former Chair of the British Group of the Inter-Parliamentary Union (IPU), an Executive Member on the (IPU) Committee on Middle East Questions and an Executive Member on the (IPU) Coordinating Committee of Women Parliamentarians.

In February 2014, after informing party leader Ed Miliband of her decision at the monthly meeting of the Cynon Valley Labour Party, Clwyd announced that she was to stand down at the 2015 general election. However, she subsequently changed her mind but was told that she would need to go through a reselection process as the procedure to find her successor had already been put in train by the Labour Party. On 13 December 2014, she was reselected from an all-women shortlist as the Labour Party candidate in Cynon Valley for the 2015 General Election.

Clwyd was one of 13 MPs to vote against triggering the 2017 General Election.

In the series of Parliamentary votes on Brexit in March 2019, Clwyd voted against the Labour Party whip and in favour of an amendment tabled by members of The Independent Group for a second public vote.

In September 2019, Clwyd announced again that she intended to retire at the next general election.

=== Iraq ===
Through her interest in human rights and international women's rights, Clwyd became involved in the debate around the rule of Saddam Hussein in Iraq. Whilst opposition spokesperson for Foreign Affairs, she was sacked along with Jim Cousins for observing the Turkish Army's invasion of Iraqi Kirkuk without permission. From 1997 to 2005 Clwyd was a member of the International Development Select Committee.

On 12 March 2003, James Mahon made first mention of the claims that some Iraqis were killed in plastic shredders or woodchippers, when he addressed the House of Commons after returning from research in northern Iraq. Six days later, Clwyd wrote an article in The Times entitled "See men shredded, then say you don't back war," saying that an unnamed Iraqi had said that Saddam and Qusay Hussein fed opponents of their Baathist rule into a plastic shredder or woodchipper, and then used their shredded bodies as fish food. Later she would add that it was believed to be housed in Abu Ghraib prison, and spoke with an unidentified person who claimed the American-sourced shredders were dismantled "just before the military got there". As the first journalist to state the unsubstantiated claim, the rolling effect of the gruesome verbal picture garnered wider media and international political support, including from Australian Prime Minister John Howard, for an invasion of Iraq. The Sun's political editor Trevor Kavanagh wrote in February 2004 that as a result of Clwyd's article "Public opinion swung behind Tony Blair, as voters learned how Saddam fed dissidents feet first into industrial shredders." As she had been vocal and prominent in her concern for the situation in Iraq before the war, Tony Blair made her a Special Envoy on Human Rights in Iraq in the run-up to the war.

At the Chilcot Inquiry in February 2010, Clwyd explained why she supported the Iraq War. A month before the invasion, she had been on a visit to Kurdistan collecting evidence regarding human rights abuses. There she found people living in fear of a repeat of the 1988 Halabja massacre, where 5,000 Kurds had been killed in a gas attack. Whilst there she was taken by the wife of the [now] President of Iraq to the border of Iraq and Kurdistan, where she pointed towards the hillside and said: "That’s where they are going to fire the chemical weapons from." On publication of the Chilcot report in July 2016, Clwyd remained unmoved: "So would I have still voted in Parliament in 2003 to support military action in Iraq – with the benefit of hindsight and in light of the Chilcot report? Yes. No one will ever be able to convince me that the world is not better off without Saddam Hussein and his Baathist regime in power."

=== NHS ===
Clwyd was a member of the Royal Commission on the National Health Service 1976–79.

In December 2012 Clwyd publicly criticised the standard of nursing care that her husband Owen Roberts had received at the University Hospital of Wales when he was dying there in October 2012. She focussed on the lack of compassion shown to him.

In 2013, following the Stafford Enquiry report, she was appointed by the Prime Minister to advise on complaint handling in the NHS.

=== Female genital mutilation ===
In 2003, Clwyd was chosen for a place to introduce a Private member's bill via a ballot of MPs. She was pressed by hundreds of pressure groups who wished to publicise their own groups, and promote their own proposals for legislation. She chose to introduce the Female Genital Mutilation Bill (to prohibit parents from sending, or taking, their daughters abroad for operations such as female circumcision), which was successfully enacted. Female circumcision itself had already been banned in 1985.

== Other positions ==
Clwyd was admitted to the White Robe of the Gorsedd of Bards at the National Eisteddfod of Wales in 1991. She was an Honorary Fellow of the University of Wales, Bangor, and the North East Wales Institute of Higher Education, which awarded her a University of Wales honorary degree. She held an Honorary Doctorate of Laws from Trinity College, Carmarthen for her contribution to politics and as a human rights campaigner. She was a Member of the Arts Council 1975–1979 and the Vice Chair of the Welsh Arts Council 1975–97.

== Personal life ==
In 1963, Ann Clwyd married Owen Dryhurst Roberts, a television director and producer. He died in October 2012, at the age of 73.

Clwyd died at her home in Cardiff on 21 July 2023, at the age of 86.

== Honours ==
- Clwyd was sworn in as a member of Her Majesty's Most Honourable Privy Council in 2004, giving her the honorific title "The Right Honourable" for Life.

European Parliament
Preceded by (new post)	Member of the European Parliament for Mid and West Wales; 1979–1984	Succeeded by David Morris
Parliament of the United Kingdom
Preceded by Ioan Evans	Member of Parliament for Cynon Valley; 1984–2019	Succeeded by Beth Winter
Political offices
Preceded by Jean Corston	Chair of the Parliamentary Labour Party; 2005–2006	Succeeded by Tony Lloyd
