= Mid and West Wales (European Parliament constituency) =

Former European Parliament constituency

- European Parliament constituency
- Boundary within Wales (1979-1984)
- Member state: United Kingdom
- Created: 1979
- Dissolved: 1999
- MEPs: 1

Mid and West Wales was a European Parliament constituency covering south western Wales.

Prior to its uniform adoption of proportional representation in 1999, the United Kingdom used first-past-the-post for the European elections in England, Scotland and Wales. The European Parliament constituencies used under that system were smaller than the later regional constituencies and only had one Member of the European Parliament each.

The seat became part of the much larger Wales constituency in 1999.

Boundary within Wales (1984-1994)

Boundary within Wales (1994-1999)

== Boundaries ==
1979–1984: Brecon and Radnor; Cardigan; Carmarthen; Gower; Llanelli; Pembroke; Swansea East; Swansea West.

1984–1994: Brecon and Radnor; Carmarthen; Ceredigion and Pembroke North; Gower; Llanelli; Neath; Pembroke; Swansea East; Swansea West.

1994–1999: Brecon and Radnor; Carmarthen; Ceredigion and Pembroke North; Llanelli; Meirionnydd Nant Conwy; Montgomery; Pembroke.

== Members of the European Parliament ==
Elected	Name	Party
1979	Ann Clwyd	Labour
1984	David Morris	Labour
1994	Eluned Morgan	Labour

== Results ==
European Parliament election, 1979: Mid and West Wales
Party	Candidate	Votes	%	±%
Labour	Ann Clwyd	77,474	41.4	
Conservative	David Lloyd	67,226	36.0	
Plaid Cymru	Hywel Moseley	22,730	12.2	
Liberal	Clem Thomas	17,628	9.4	
Independent	H. D. Windsor-Williams	1,826	1.0	
Majority		10,248	5.4	
Turnout		186,884	38.2	
New creation: Labour win.		Swing	N/A	

European Parliament election, 1984: Mid and West Wales
Party	Candidate	Votes	%	±%
Labour	David Morris	89,362	41.6	+0.2
Conservative	David Lewis	52,910	24.7	−11.3
Liberal	David G. B. Lloyd	35,168	16.4	+7.0
Plaid Cymru	Phil Williams	32,880	15.3	+3.1
Ecology	Marilyn Smith	4,266	2.0	New
Majority		36,452	16.9	+11.5
Turnout		214,586	40.2	+2.0
Labour hold		Swing		

European Parliament election, 1989: Mid and West Wales
Party	Candidate	Votes	%	±%
Labour	David Morris	105,670	46.9	+5.3
Conservative	Owen John Williams	53,758	23.9	−0.8
Green	B. I. McPake	29,852	13.2	+11.2
Plaid Cymru	Phil Williams	26,063	11.6	−3.7
SLD	Geoffrey Sinclair	10,031	4.4	−12.0
Majority		51,912	23.0	+6.1
Turnout		225,374	41.2	+1.0
Labour hold		Swing		

European Parliament election, 1994: Mid and West Wales
Party	Candidate	Votes	%	±%
Labour	Eluned Morgan	78,092	40.5	−6.4
Plaid Cymru	Marc Phillips	48,858	25.4	+13.8
Conservative	Peter Bone	31,606	16.4	−7.5
Liberal Democrats	Juliana Hughes	23,719	12.3	+7.9
UKIP	David Rowlands	5,536	2.9	New
Green	Chris Busby	3,938	2.0	−11.2
Natural Law	M. T. L. (Tom) Griffith-Jones	988	0.5	New
Majority		29,234	15.1	−7.9
Turnout		192,737	48.0	+6.8
Labour hold		Swing		
