= David Morris (Labour politician) =

Welsh politician (1930–2007)

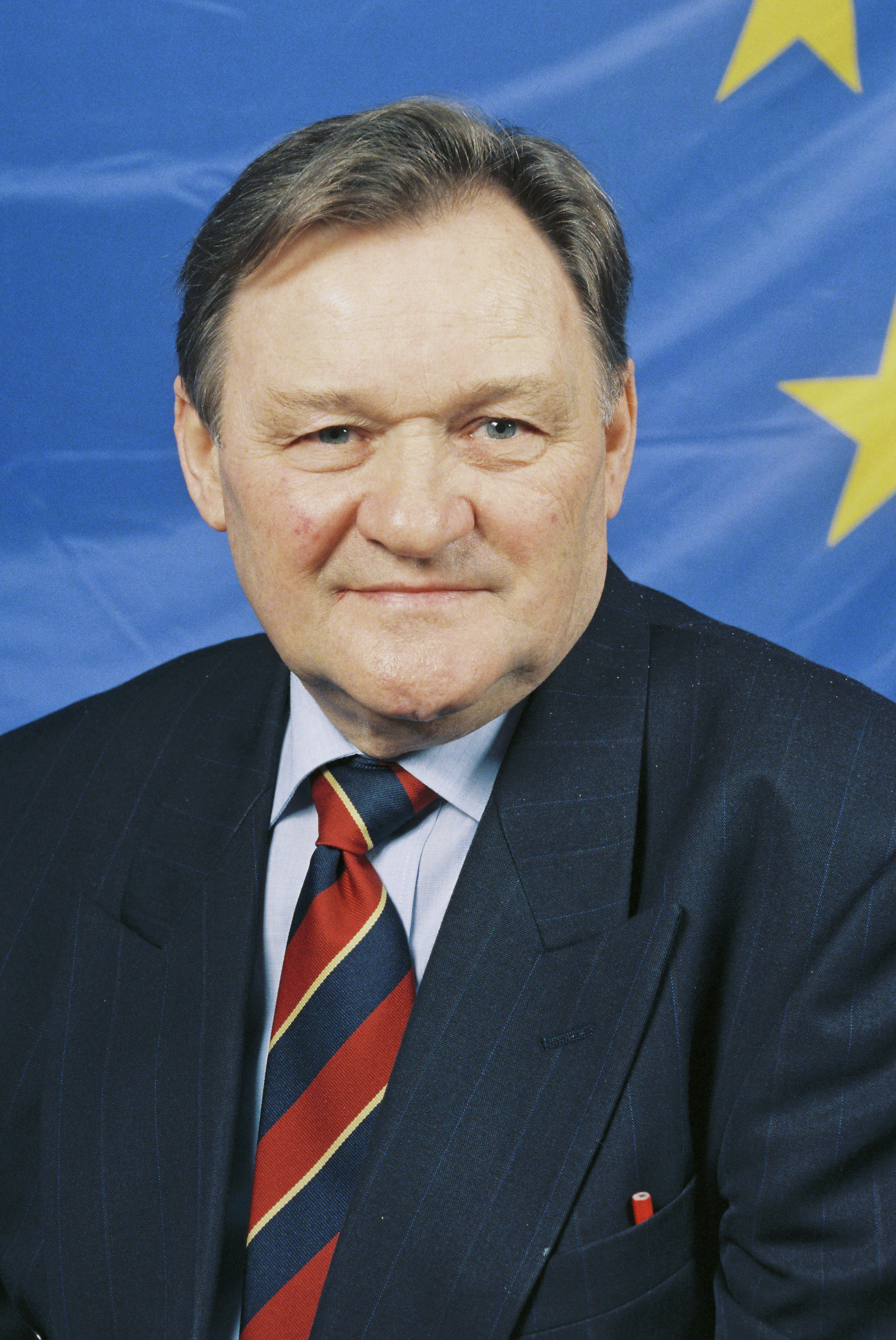
European Parliament portrait

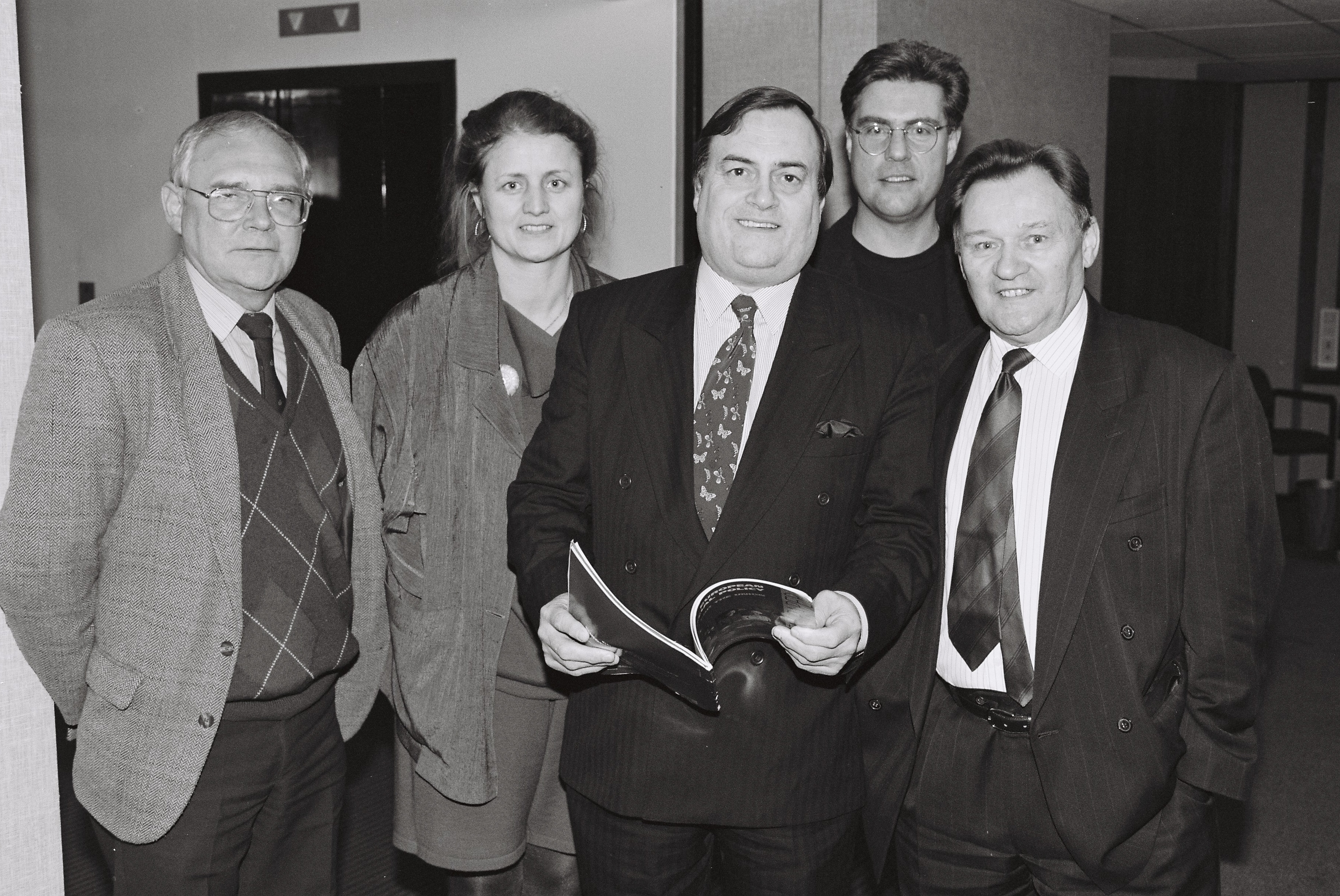
Morris (right), John Prescott and British MEPs of the Labour party react to the EC Green Paper on the European Social Policy, 1993

David Morris (28 January 1930 – 24 January 2007) was a Welsh politician, Member of the European Parliament (MEP), chairman of Campaign for Nuclear Disarmament (CND) Cymru and peace activist.

Morris was born in Kidderminster, but adopted by a Welsh family. He joined the Labour Party at the age of fifteen, and as a young man he worked in a steel foundry in Llanelli, South Wales. During National Service in the late 1940s he was exempted from military service as a conscientious objector, conditional upon working down coal mines.

He gained a scholarship to Ruskin College, Oxford, and became a Presbyterian minister in 1958.

Morris became an anti-nuclear campaigner in 1957, opposing Operation Grapple X, in which Britain tested nuclear weapons including its first hydrogen bombs over the Pacific Ocean atoll of Christmas Island (now Kiritimati).

== Political career ==
Morris served as a Labour Party Councillor in South Wales, and unsuccessfully contested Brecon and Radnorshire at the 1983 general election before being elected in 1984 as the Member of the European Parliament (MEP) for Mid and West Wales. After boundary changes he served until 1999, latterly representing South Wales West, an area corresponding to Swansea, Neath Port Talbot and Bridgend.

In the late 1990s, due to the introduction of a list system of proportional representation for British seats, the Labour Party introduced a transitional selection process to determine its candidates for the 1999 European elections. Like other internal Labour Party processes of the time (e.g. "Labour London Mayor Selection" and the "Welsh Labour Leadership Election"), the process to determine the order of candidates on the party list for the 1999 elections was controversial, with allegations that it was undemocratic and designed to sideline left-of-centre candidates, such as Morris.

Morris, like the other sitting Welsh MEPs, was re-elected to be a Labour candidate by members in his own soon-to-be-defunct constituency. However, in the more important process to determine the Welsh Labour candidates’ party list ranking, Morris was placed too low to have a realistic chance of being elected, and he therefore withdrew as a candidate. He blamed his deselection on his outspoken opposition to the Trident project.

After retiring from the European Parliament, Morris remained active in Welsh and Labour politics. Indeed, he eventually benefited from the democratisation of the Welsh Labour Party that occurred after Rhodri Morgan took over as leader, when he was elected to represent "South West Wales" (the same area as his former European constituency) on the National Executive Committee of the Welsh Labour Party, on which he served until 2006.

== Sources ==
- Guardian obituary

European Parliament
Preceded by Ann Clwyd	Member of the European Parliament for Mid and West Wales; 1984–1994	Succeeded by Eluned Morgan
New constituency	Member of the European Parliament for South Wales West; 1994–1999	constituency abolished
