= Joe Wilson (British politician) =

British politician (born 1937)

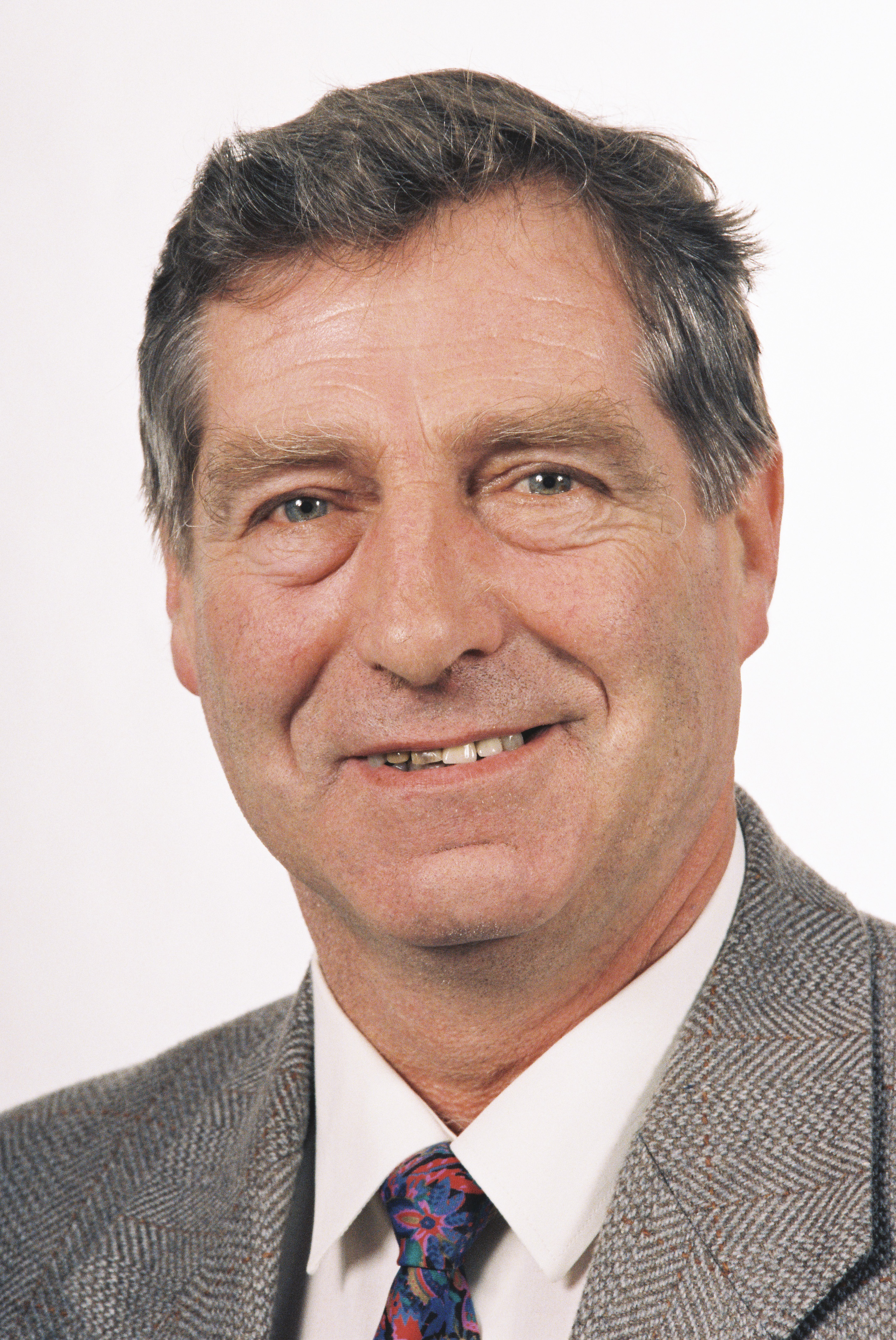
- Official MEP portrait

Member of the European Parliament
- In office 25 July 1989 – 19 July 1999
- Constituency: North Wales

Personal details
- Born: 6 July 1937 (age 88) Birkenhead, United Kingdom
- Party: Labour
- Occupation: Politician

Anthony Joseph Wilson (born 6 July 1937) is a British politician who served as a member of the European Parliament.

Wilson was born in Birkenhead and was educated at Loughborough College and the University of Wales. He became a teacher, then spent time as a manager and as a lecturer. He became active in the Labour Party, serving on Wrexham Borough Council, also chairing Wrexham Trades Council. At the 1983 general election, he stood unsuccessfully for Montgomeryshire.

At the 1989 European Parliament election, Wilson was elected to represent North Wales, and spent time as the European Parliamentary Labour Party's spokesperson on agriculture and rural affairs. He stood down in 1999.

== Parliamentary service ==
- Vice-Chair, Delegation for relations with Canada (1992–1994)
