= List of UK Parliament constituencies in Mid Glamorgan =

The Preserved county of Mid Glamorgan is divided into 6 parliamentary constituencies, one of which is shared with Gwent. The current boundaries have been effective since the 2007 National Assembly for Wales election and the 2010 United Kingdom general election.

== Constituencies ==
Name
1. Bridgend CC *
2. Cynon Valley CC
3. Merthyr Tydfil and Rhymney CC (part)
4. Ogmore CC *
5. Pontypridd CC *
6. Rhondda CC
7. 1997-2010 Vale of Glamorgan CC (covered very small part of the Preserved County)

* pre-2010 parts coloured white were included and were in South Glamorgan
(in the case of Ogmore the part was too small to show)

1997 to 2010

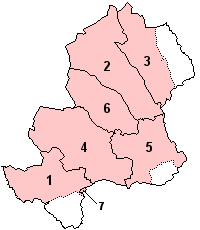
Parliamentary constituencies in Mid Glamorgan

From 2010

Proposed Revision

Conservative † Labour ‡

Constituency	Electorate	Majority	Member of Parliament	Nearest opposition	Map reference above
Bridgend CC	63,303	1,157	Jamie Wallis †	Madeleine Moon ‡	1
Cynon Valley CC	51,134	8,822	Beth Winter ‡	Pauline Church †	2
Merthyr Tydfil and Rhymney CC (western part is in Mid Glamorgan)	56,322	10,606	Gerald Jones ‡	Sarah Jones †	3
Ogmore CC	57,581	7,805	Chris Elmore ‡	Sadie Vidal †	4
Pontypridd CC	60,327	5,887	Alex Davies-Jones ‡	Sam Trask †	5
Rhondda CC	50,262	11,440	Chris Bryant ‡	Hannah Jarvis †	6

== Proposed boundary changes ==
The Boundary Commission for Wales submitted their final proposals in respect of the Sixth Periodic Review of Westminster Constituencies (the 2018 review) in September 2018. Although the proposals were immediately laid before Parliament they were not brought forward by the Government for approval. Accordingly, they did not come into effect for the 2019 election which took place on 12 December 2019, and which was contested using the constituency boundaries in place since 2010.

Under the terms of the Parliamentary Voting System and Constituencies Act 2011, the Sixth Review was based on reducing the total number of MPs from 650 to 600 and a strict electoral parity requirement that the electorate of all constituencies should be within a range of 5% either side of the electoral quota.

On 24 March 2020, the Minister of State for the Cabinet Office, Chloe Smith, issued a written statement to Parliament setting out the Government's thinking with regard to parliamentary boundaries. They propose to bring forward primary legislation to remove the statutory obligation to implement the 2018 Boundary Review recommendations, as well as set the framework for future boundary reviews in time for the next review which is due to begin in early 2021 and report no later than October 2023. It is proposed that the number of constituencies now remains at the current level of 650, rather than being reduced to 600, while retaining the requirement that the electorate should be no more than +/- 5% from the electoral quota.

== See also ==
- List of parliamentary constituencies in Wales
- List of parliamentary constituencies in West Glamorgan for historical representation by party for the whole of Glamorgan

The implemented Fifth Periodic Review of Westminster constituencies.
