= Nick Ward =

Nick Ward may refer to:

== Music ==
- Nick Ward (Australian musician) (born 2002/2003), writer of the score for the 2025 drama film Jimpa
- Nick Ward (Welsh musician) (c. 2009), Welsh singer-songwriter
- Nick Ward, drummer, percussionist, and vocalist in Australian alt-rock group the Church

== Sport ==
- Nick Ward (basketball) (born 1997), American basketballer in the Canadian Elite Basketball League
- Nick Ward (footballer, born 1977), Welsh footballer in the Welsh Premier League
- Nick Ward (soccer, born 1985), Australian association footballer in the National Premier League

== Other uses ==
- Nick Ward (physician), British physician and expert on smallpox

== See also ==
- Nicholas Ward (disambiguation)
