= Newton, Porthcawl =

Coordinates: 51.484°N 3.679°W

Newton: Welsh: Drenewydd yn Notais
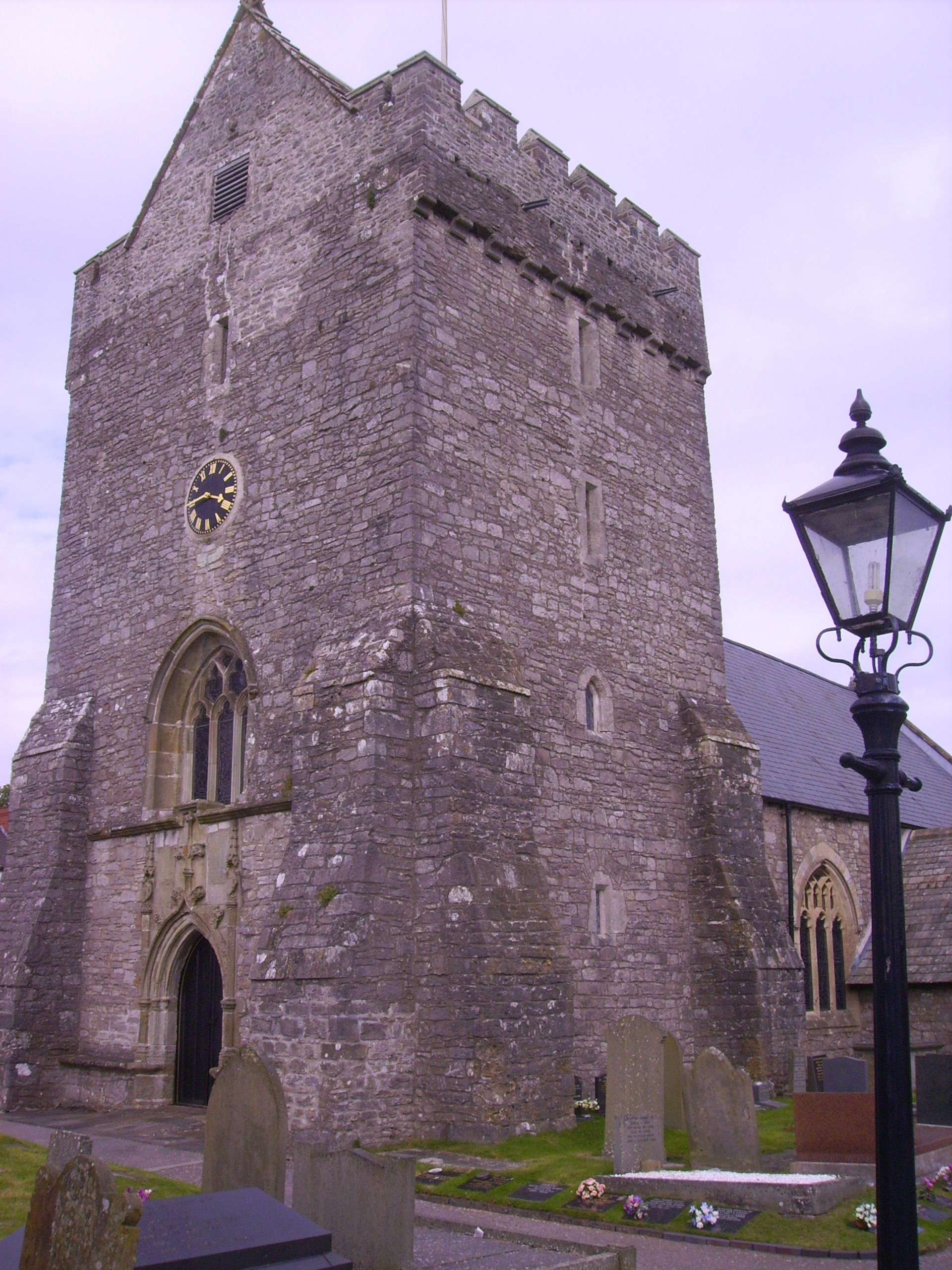
- St John the Baptist Church

- Location within Bridgend
- Population: 3,608 (ward 2011)
- OS grid reference: SS834774
- Principal area: Bridgend
- Preserved county: Bridgend
- Country: Wales
- Sovereign state: United Kingdom
- Post town: PORTHCAWL
- Postcode district: CF36 5
- Dialling code: 01656
- Police: South Wales
- Fire: South Wales
- Ambulance: Welsh
- UK Parliament: Bridgend
- Senedd Cymru – Welsh Parliament: Bridgend (National Assembly for Wales constituency)

Newton (Welsh: Drenewydd yn Notais) is a village located near the seaside resort town of Porthcawl, in Bridgend County Borough, Wales.

== History and amenities ==
Newton village dates from the 12th century. The St John the Baptist Church was founded by the Knights of the Order of St. John of Jerusalem 800 years ago. Originally built as a fortress, it still overlooks the village green.

The Jolly Sailor pub, the oldest in Porthcawl, and the Ancient Briton pub also overlook the green. 140 yards (130 metres) to the south of the church lies St. John's water well, the water from which is reputed to have healing properties.

Newton Beach is a long sandy beach, approximately 3 miles long, stretching from Newton Point in the west to the mouth of the River Ogmore in the east.

The Newton Burrows and Merthyr Mawr sand dunes back Newton beach, and are a designated Site of Special Scientific Interest. The present warren is what is left of what was once the largest sand dune system in Europe, stretching along the coast to Mumbles. The dunes form an important habitat for wildlife and plants, and also claim fame to the second highest sand dune in Europe, locally known as the ‘big dipper’. Some of the filming of Lawrence of Arabia took place on the dunes.

The sand dunes were featured in the BBC series Coast and Weatherman Walking.

Newton is home to one independent school: St Clare's

== Governance ==
Newton is a ward to Porthcawl Town Council and Bridgend County Borough Council. It is represented by four town councillors on Porthcawl Town Council.

Since the 1999 county elections Newton has been a county ward, electing one county councillor to Bridgend County Borough Council.

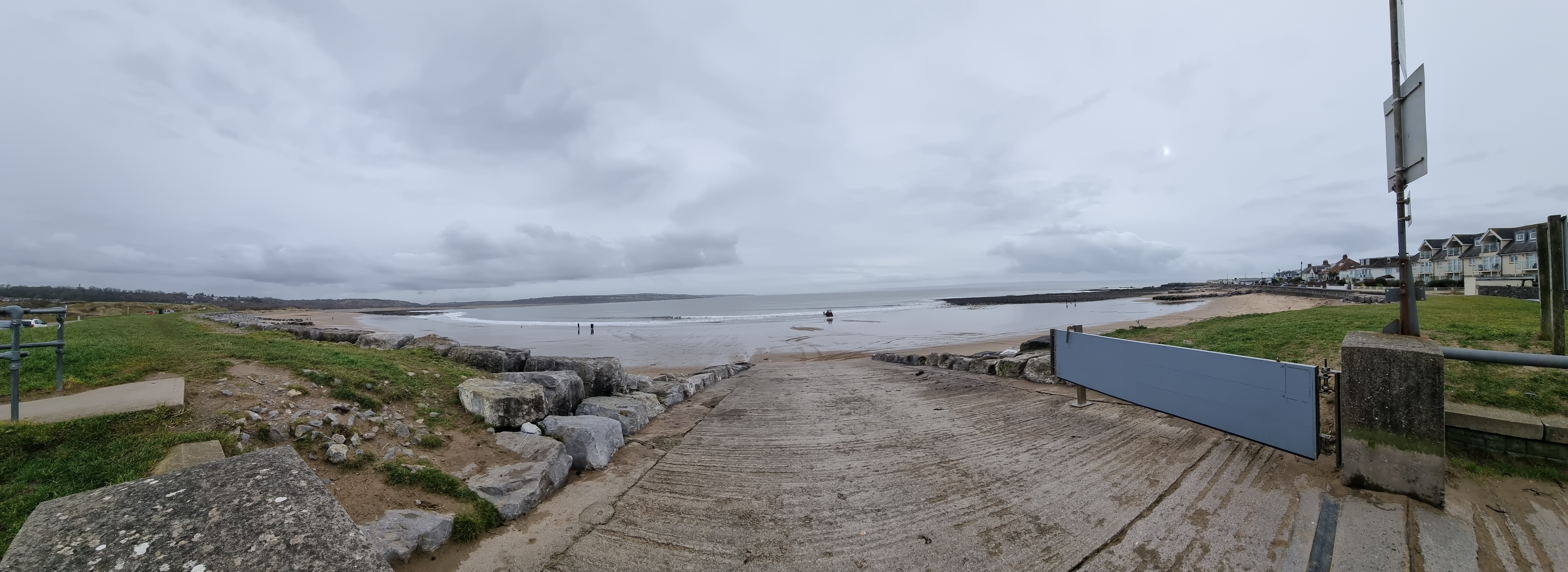
Panorama of Newton beach

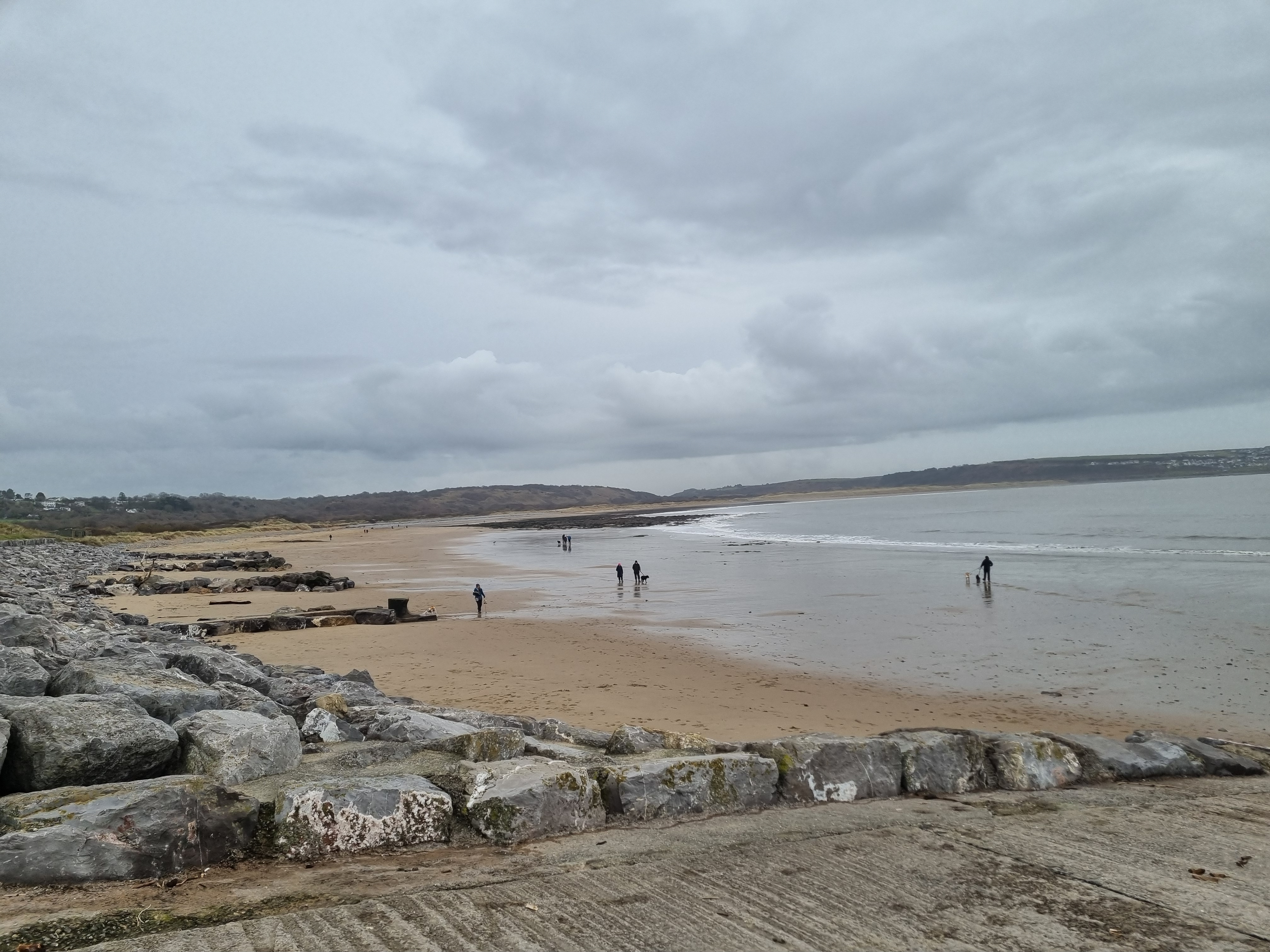
Dunes of Newton beach
