= St John the Baptist Church, Porthcawl =

Coordinates: 51.4842°N 3.6769°W

St John the Baptist Church
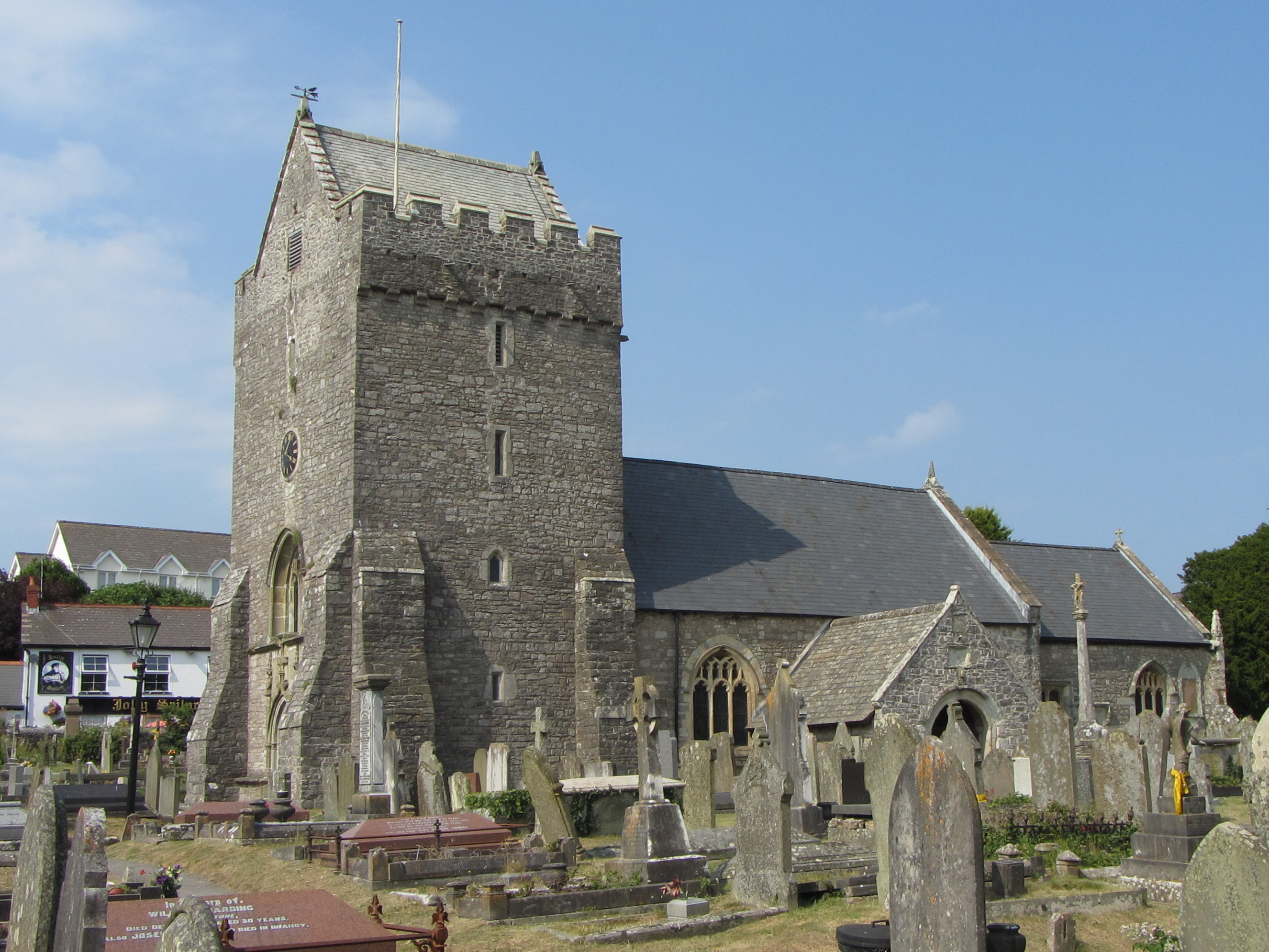

- Location within the Bridgend area
- Location: Church Street, Newton Porthcawl
- Country: Wales
- Denomination: Church in Wales

Architecture
- Heritage designation: Grade I
- Architectural type: Church
- Completed: 1180s

St John the Baptist Church is a medieval church and Grade I listed building in Church Street, Newton, Porthcawl, Wales. It was built in the late twelfth century and has been remodelled several times in the succeeding centuries.

== History ==
The church was probably built in the 1180s as the first rector was installed in 1189. It was refurbished by Jasper Tudor, Duke of Bedford, in 1485–1495, and again in 1825–1827 by the rector Rev. Robert Knight, who added the vestry and altered the stone pulpit. The building was restored by John Prichard and John Pollard Seddon in 1860–1861 and an organ chamber was added in 1885. More restoration work in 1903 and 1927 included reflooring the nave, reroofing the porch and installing oak stalls in the chancel. A meeting room and vestry wing were added in 1993.

== Description ==
The plan of the building is a tower in the west, nave, south porch, chancel, north-eastern chapel and northern wing. The church is built of roughly coursed grey rubble with grey or yellow ashlar dressings and has a slate roof with stone apex finials. The large and defensive west tower has wide-angle buttresses at each corner and a saddleback roof with embattled and corbelled parapets only on the northern and southern sides. The stone-tiled coping is topped by a weathervane. The northern and southern faces of the tower have four storeys of small round or square openings, although one on the south face is trefoil-headed. The eastern facade has large shouldered openings above a corbel table which probably supported a wooden platform. The western side of the tower has a face corbel, reputedly of Saint John the Baptist, above a louvred gable opening, a clock and a three-light window above the ornate western doorway.

== See also ==
- Media related to St John the Baptist Church, Newton at Wikimedia Commons
