= Peter Hubbard-Miles =

British politician

Peter Hubbard-Miles CBE

Member of Parliament for Bridgend
- In office 9 June 1983 – 18 May 1987
- Preceded by: Constituency Created
- Succeeded by: Win Griffiths

Personal details
- Born: 9 May 1927
- Died: 1 October 2005 (aged 78) Bridgend
- Party: Welsh Conservative

Peter Charles Hubbard-Miles CBE (9 May 1927 – 1 October 2005) was a British Conservative Party politician.

== Early career ==
Hubbard-Miles was educated at Lewis School in Pengam. From 1967 onwards, he was a member at various times of Glamorgan County Council, Porthcawl Urban District Council, Mid Glamorgan County Council and Ogwr Borough Council. In the February 1974 general election, he stood unsuccessfully in the Labour stronghold of Aberavon. He was appointed a Commander of the Order of the British Empire (CBE) in the 1981 Birthday Honours for political and public service in Wales.

== MP for Bridgend ==
Hubbard-Miles was elected Member of Parliament for the newly created seat of Bridgend in the 1983 Conservative landslide. He was a member of the Select Committee on Welsh Affairs from 1983 to 1985, and was parliamentary private secretary to Nicholas Edwards the Secretary of State for Wales from 1985 to 1987.

In July 1983, he introduced a private member's bill for the licensing of caravan and tent sites.

At the 1987 general election, Hubbard-Miles lost the Bridgend seat to Labour Party candidate Win Griffiths.

As is traditional, the incoming MP paid tribute to his predecessor in his maiden speech. Win Griffiths said:

"At the outset of my speech, I pay tribute to my predecessor in the Bridgend constituency, Mr. Peter Hubbard-Miles. He was the first Conservative to represent any constituency in the county of Mid-Glamorgan. Tribute must be paid to him for that signal achievement, which of course I hope will be the last. He showed his independence and fighting spirit during the selection process before the 1983 election, when he successfully took his local Conservative and Unionist Association to court and managed to stop the foisting on the constituency of a person who was rumoured to be a friend of the right hon. Member for Chingford (Mr. Tebbit), the present Conservative party chairman. In 1985, at Westminster, his talents were recognised when the then Secretary of State for Wales, Mr. Nicholas Edwards, who has left this place, appointed him as his parliamentary private secretary. Although he no longer represents the Bridgend constituency, he still has an interest in it. He represents a part of it—Porthcawl—on the council of the county of Mid-Glamorgan. Once again, he had the signal achievement of being the only Conservative on the council—a solitary role that he manages to play with some success for the people in Porthcawl."

== Later life ==
Peter Hubbard-Miles stood for the Conservatives in the Porthcawl Town Council elections in 2003; and as an Independent candidate for the same council in 2004.

On his death in 2005, he left his wife Pam and children Penny, Piers, Philippa, Pamela and Peter.

Parliament of the United Kingdom
New constituency	Member of Parliament for Bridgend; 1983–1987	Succeeded by Win Griffiths
