= Seabank Hotel =

Hotel in Porthcawl, Wales

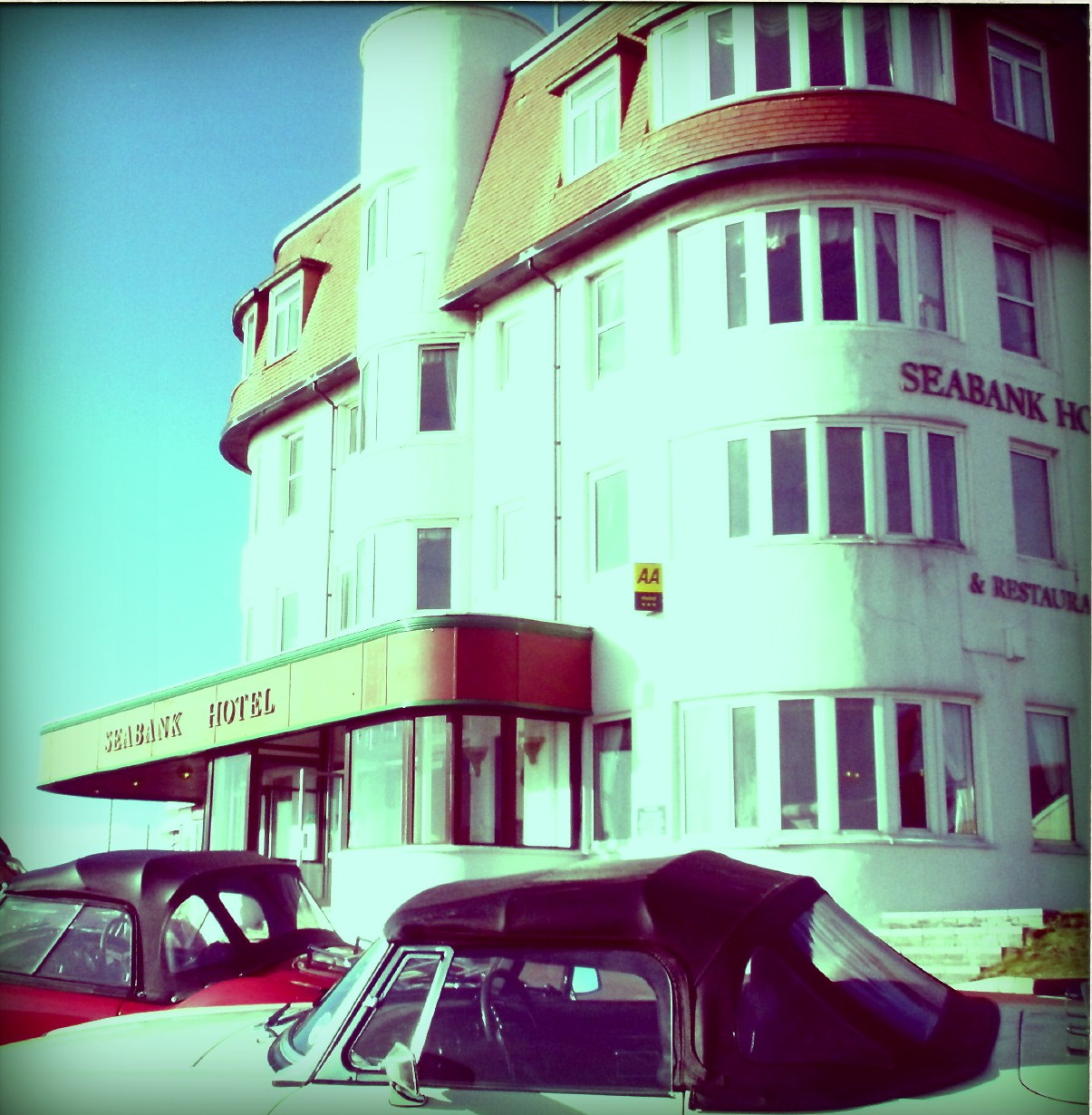
- Seabank Hotel in 1973

- Location within Bridgend

General information
- Location: Porthcawl, Bridgend County Borough, Wales, United Kingdom
- Coordinates: 51°28′35″N 3°42′29″W
- Opening: 1860 (in its present building in the 1930s)

Technical details
- Floor count: 4

Other information
- Number of rooms: 89
- Number of restaurants: 1
- Parking: yes

The Seabank Hotel is an historic hotel located in Porthcawl, southern Wales. The hotel is located on the corner of the front Esplanade and Picton Avenue overlooking the sea. The current building is dated to the mid-1930s. The distinctive white building with its red tiled roof, along with the Grand Pavilion several metres to the east, is one of the town's most prominent landmarks. The hotel has 89 rooms.

== History ==
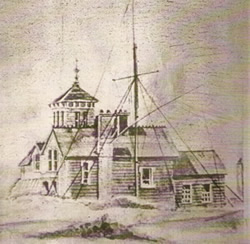
The original "New House" building in 1860

The hotel originally began around 1860 as a smaller building named the New House and was built by George Dement, an architect who designed John Street in Porthcawl.

Around 1870, a larger house was built on the site and was named "The Seaview Bank". It was bought by the prominent Brogden family and John Brogden, an important figure in the town's development in the late 19th century (who gave his name to John Street) simplified the name to "Sea Bank House". This building was built with grey stonework and over time the building developed ivy on the walls around the French windows. It had a prominent Italianate style tower at the front and a quaint little garden was once located at the front side of the hotel.

Around 1890, the family fell into financial difficulties and it became Porthcawl College in 1891 which was run by Reverend E.J. Newell of Oxford University until 1906. In 1907 creditors of the Brogden family, the owners of the building, called in their loans and it was bought by John Elias and others for conversion into a hotel. The Sea Bank Hotel opened in 1910.

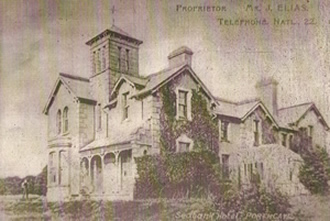
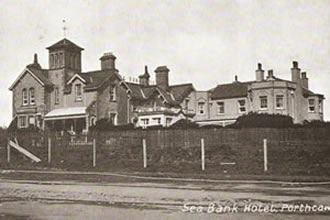
Left: Hotel in 1900. Note the Italianate style tower and stonework and developing ivy. Right: Hotel in 1920

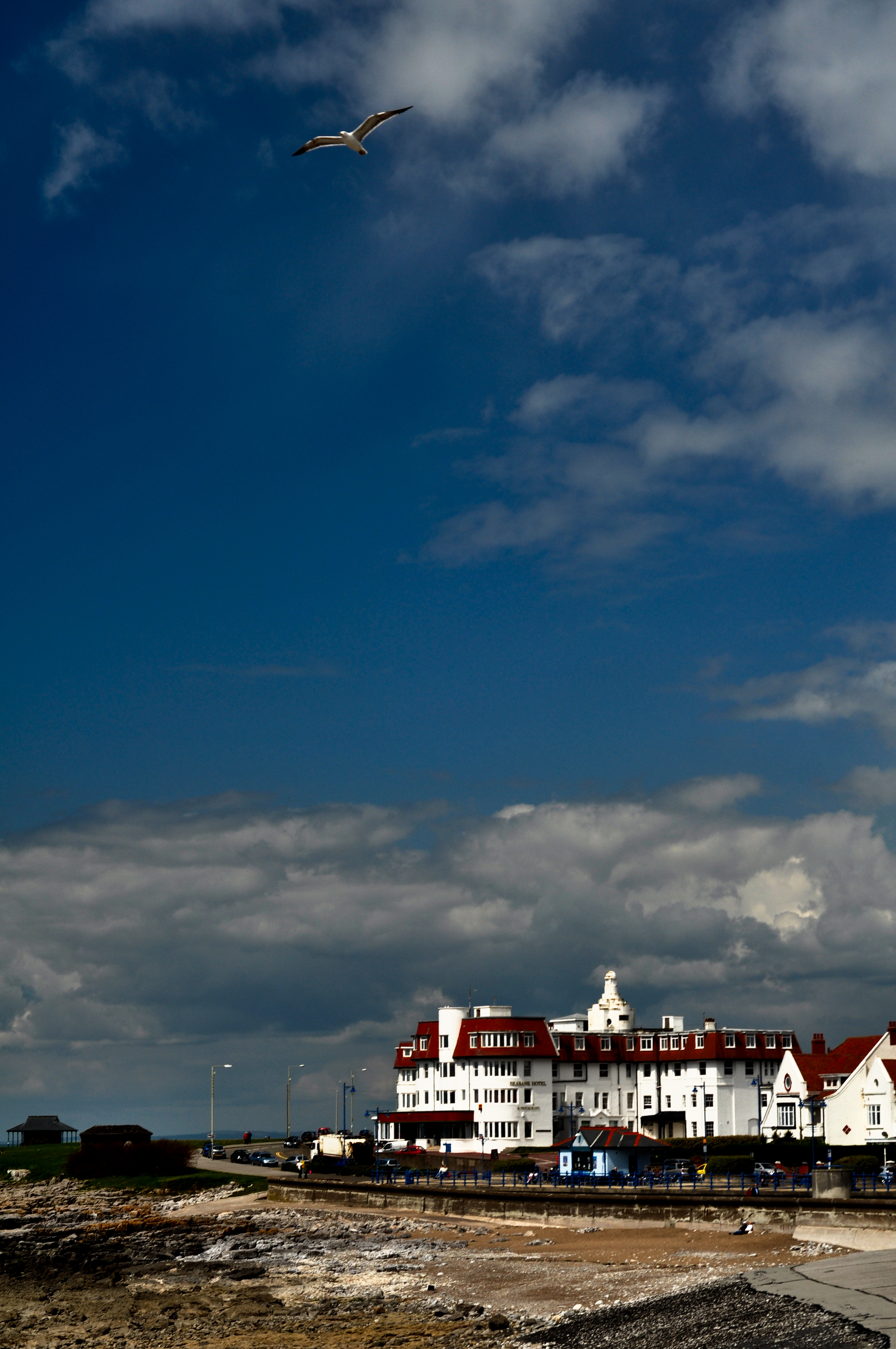
View of the hotel from the beach

In the 1930s a new structure and modern concrete facade was built to and it was renamed the "Seabank Hydro" hotel. During World War II the hotel was used as a base by the military. In 1943, US troops of the 28th Infantry Division were stationed at the hotel, followed by the 75th Infantry Division in 1944 to train before the Battle of the Bulge.

In 1945 the hotel underwent major refurbishment and again in the 1990s.

== Interior ==
The hotel has 89 rooms and is listed by the AA as a 3-star hotel. The rooms range from single to twin and double rooms. All are en-suite and include breakfast. Historically the hotel has been used extensively for conferences and important business meetings but is now primarily a coaching hotel being part of the Leisureplex Hotels Ltd.

The "Smuggler's Bar" is open to the public and seats up to 96 people overlooking the Bristol Channel with views towards Somerset and Devon. Lunch is served every day between 12.00 and 15.00.
