= Brynteg School =

- Ysgol Brynteg
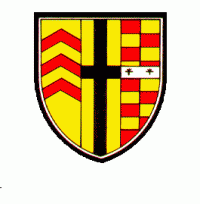

Location
- Ewenny Road; Bridgend, CF31 3ER; Wales; 51.49793°N 3.5776°W

Information
- Type: Co-educational secondary comprehensive
- Motto: A fo ben bid bont
- Established: 1896 (Bridgend Intermediate); 1971 (Brynteg Comprehensive)
- Local authority: Bridgend County Borough
- Age: 11 to 18
- Website: http://www.bryntegschool.co.uk

Brynteg School (Welsh: Ysgol Brynteg) is one of the largest secondary schools in Wales. It is located on Ewenny Road in Bridgend, Wales. The school is one of seven comprehensive schools in the County Borough of Bridgend and mainly receives pupils from the Brackla, Litchard and Town Centre (Morfa) areas.

== History ==
Brynteg, whilst not becoming a comprehensive school until 1971, can trace its roots and history back to 1896. (Note: Taken from Brynteg: From a Fair Hill, Published 1986,)

=== Bridgend Intermediate School (1896–1935) ===
The Bridgend Intermediate School in Morfa Street (now Penybont Primary School) was opened on 21 September 1896. The boys' section of the school was opened by South Glamorganshire MP Arthur John Williams, while the girls' section was opened by Lady Rachel Wyndham-Quinn, daughter of Lord Dynraven, who had donated land for the school. The school's fees were £1 5s per term in addition to stationery costs of 1s 6d per term plus text books which pupils were charged a 25% discount.

By 1904 the school had exceeded its planned capacity of 120. In 1907 there were 276 pupils (116 boys and 92 girls). Over the coming years various extensions and alterations were made to the school and individual classrooms to help accommodate growing pupil numbers. Pupil numbers reached 500 by 1931. (Note: Taken from Brynteg: From a Fair Hill, Published 1986,)

=== Single sex education (1935–1971) ===
As pupil numbers continued to grow a new 15-acre site was identified off Ewenny Road and a new school (renamed Bridgend Grammar School for Boys in 1945) was built and opened in 1935 at the cost of £25,000 (almost £1.8 million in 2020). The school was built on the site of Brynteg House. The official opening ceremony of the new school took place on 26 September 1935 and was attended by Oliver Stanley, president of the Board of Education. Girls meanwhile continued to be taught at the original site where their numbers increased from 260 in 1935 to 360 in 1946 under their headmistress E N Evans. The school eventually became The Girls Grammar School (Note: Taken from Brynteg: From a Fair Hill, Published 1986,)

=== Heolgam County Secondary School (1948–1971) ===
A mile away from the new boys' school, Heolgam County Secondary School opened in July 1948 with 250 pupils and 12 staff. When the school opened The Glamorgan Gazette described it as having

“Six classrooms, a science room, a lecture room, two large gymnasiums, wood and metal work rooms, an art and craft room, two domestic science rooms, dining halls, offices and a large Assembly Hall with a good sized stage.”

Heolgam expanded rapidly and an additional five classrooms were built in 1954. The school continued until its closure on 31 August 1971. (Note: Taken from Brynteg: From a Fair Hill, Published 1986,)

Head teachers of Heolgam County Secondary School

- Gwyn I Thomas, Jan 1948 – Feb 1954
- A M Graville, Feb 1954 – Easter 1966
- C H Nicholls, Sept 1966 – July 1970
- G Mead, July 1970 – August 1971

=== Brynteg Comprehensive School (1971) ===
The merger of Bridgend Boys' Grammar School and Heolgam Secondary School took place on 1 September 1971 and Brynteg Comprehensive School was formed, with Heolgam serving as the lower school (forms I to III/years 7–9) and the old Boys' Grammar school serving as the upper school (forms IV to VI/years 10–13). Pupils travelled between the two sites using local roads and footpaths until the construction of an internal footpath in the early 1990s. (Note: Taken from Brynteg: From a Fair Hill, Published 1986,)

== Admissions ==
Brynteg is one of the largest schools in South Wales with 1,584 students at its last inspection in December 2016.

The student body is divided into five year groups and two sixth form years.

Date	Pupil Numbers	Staff
1971	1,266	63
1975	1,324	75
1985	1,730	97
1998	1,812	105 + 6(P/T) = FTE of 108.9
September 2003	2,068	115 + 12(P/T) = FTE of 120.7
September 2009	1,960	105 + 24(P/T) = FTE of 118.3
December 2016	1,584	
2023	1,627	Pupil Teacher Ratio = 17.1

== Facilities ==
The school is located on Ewenny Road (B4265) close to the roundabout with the A48, opposite the Heronsbridge School which shares some architectural qualities with the Upper School. Brynteg has two rugby pitches, a cricket field, an all-weather sports pitch, tennis courts and a large indoor sports hall. In recent years, the school saw the construction of a new 13-room maths block, a ten-room science block (opened in 2000) and a 12-room foreign language block (opened 2002), all built between Lower and Upper School.

Between 2003 and 2009 a further eight classrooms were built: a four-room art block a four-room English block.

Recent Estyn reports have criticised the school for a reliance on temporary classrooms (portacabins) with 17 in 2009, down from 23 in 2003.

In September 2019 the school reorganised with the former lower school site becoming the languages, literacy and communication centre, while the former upper school site became the humanities centre. Mathematics and sciences remain taught in their own buildings.

The former modern languages block was converted into the pupil well-being and reception centre which houses the main school reception, the headteacher, the pupil support team, the school nurse, careers advisor and the school counsellor.

On February 8 2024, Brynteg School opened its all-weather sports pitch.

== Headteachers ==
- John Rankin, 1896–1929
- W E Thomas, 1929–1953
- Haden Jones, 1953–1960
- Frank J Anthony, 1960–1969
- Trevor H Thomas, 1969–1979
- William Rowlands, 1978-1991 (Note: Names and dates up until 1978 are taken from Brynteg: From a Fair Hill, Published 1986,)
- Christopher Davies, 1991-2010
- David Jenkins, 2010-2017
- Ryan Davies, 2017–present

== Sport ==
The school is known for rugby union, and several former pupils have played for Wales and for the British and Irish Lions.

== Academic performance ==
In regards to examination performance records, the school is also favourable academically with 75% of GCSE students achieving 5 A*–C grades in their examinations.

Brynteg is also a venue for the Welsh Baccaulaureate, a new qualification offered to Welsh students studying at GCSE, A2 and AS Level.

== Traditions ==
The school motto is in Welsh A fo ben bid bont which translates as "To be a leader, be a bridge". Traditionally, pupils in year 8 would write and hold the school's harvest assembly in October; however this has not been the case in recent years.

The school holds a Remembrance Day service on or as close to 11 November every year during which the names of 87 former pupils who died in conflicts are read out.

== Notable former pupils ==
=== Politics ===
- Garfield Davies, trade unionist and Labour peer. (Note: As Heol Gam Secondary Modern School)
- Janice Gregory, former Welsh Labour Assembly Member and chief whip (Note: As Bridgend Grammar School for Girls.)
- Carwyn Jones, former First Minister for Wales
- Maria Miller, former Conservative MP for Basingstoke, former secretary of state for culture, media and sport
- Katie Wallis, former Conservative MP for Bridgend

=== Sport ===
Netball

- Bethan Dyke, Wales netball international

Olympic champions

- Nicole Cooke, road bicycle racer, Olympic champion 2008
- Helen Miles, 100m sprinter, Olympic Games (1988), Commonwealth Games (1986), European Junior Games (1985)

Rugby union

- Melbourne Thomas, (Bridgend, St. Bats), Wales, 6 caps 1919–1924
- Jack Matthews, (Cardiff), Wales, 17 caps 1947–1951, British Lions, 6 caps 1950
- Ken Richards, (Bridgend), Wales, 5 caps 1960–61
- J. P. R. Williams (Bridgend, London Welsh), Wales, 55 caps 1969–1981, British Lions, 8 caps 1971 & 1974
- Gareth Powell Williams (Bridgend), Wales, 5 caps 1981–1982
- Mike Hall (Cardiff), Wales, (Captain) 42 caps 1988–1995, British Lions, 1 cap 1989
- Neil Boobyer, (Llanelli RFC), Wales, 7 caps 1993-1999
- Rob Howley (Bridgend, Cardiff, Wasps), Wales, (Captain) 59 caps 1995–2002, British Lions, 2 caps 1997 & 2001
- Dafydd James (Bridgend, etc.), Wales, 49 caps 1995–2007, British Lions, 3 caps 2001
- Nathan Thomas, (Bridgend, Cardiff Blues, Scarlets), Wales 9 caps 1996–1998
- Gavin Henson (Swansea, Ospreys), Wales, 33 caps 2001–, British Lions, 1 cap 2005
- James Bater, (Llanelli Scarlets), Wales, 1 cap 2003
- Gareth John Williams, (Cardiff Blues), Wales, 9 caps 2003–2011
- Josh Navidi, (Cardiff Blues), Wales, 16 cap 2013–
- Rhys Webb, (Ospreys), wales 5 caps 2012–
- Tom Habberfield, (Ospreys)
- Matthew Morgan, (Ospreys, Bristol, Cardiff Blues), Wales, 5 caps 2014–
- Scott Baldwin, (Ospreys, Harlequins), Wales, 34 caps 2013–

Rugby league

- Kevin Ellis (Warrington Wolves), Wales, 15 caps 1991–2004, Great Britain, 1 cap 1991
- Ollie Olds (Leeds Rhinos), Wales, 1 cap 2012–
- Ben Evans (Warrington Wolves), Wales, 4 caps 2012–
- Rhys Evans (Warrington Wolves), Wales, 3 caps 2013–

=== Journalism ===
- Paul Burston, British journalist, author, broadcaster and curator
- Rebecca John, BBC Wales Today presenter/reporter

=== Others ===
- Keith Burnett, vice-chancellor of the University of Sheffield since 2007, professor of physics at the University of Oxford from 1996 to 2007
- Michael Brown, vice-chancellor of Liverpool John Moores University since 2000 (Note: As Bridgend Grammar School for Boys.)
- Aled Miles, businessman
- Robert Minhinnick, poet
- Ronald Lewis, actor
- Gary Owen, playwright
- John V. Tucker, computer scientist
- Maggie O'Farrell, novelist.
- Callum MacLeod, Love Island series 5

== Former teachers ==
- Wayne David, Labour MP for Caerphilly
- Lynn Davies Olympic champion (long jump) 1964 Tokyo Games (Bridgend Grammar School PE teacher)
- Owen Powell, guitarist for Catatonia (band)
