= Katie Wallis =

British politician (born 1984)

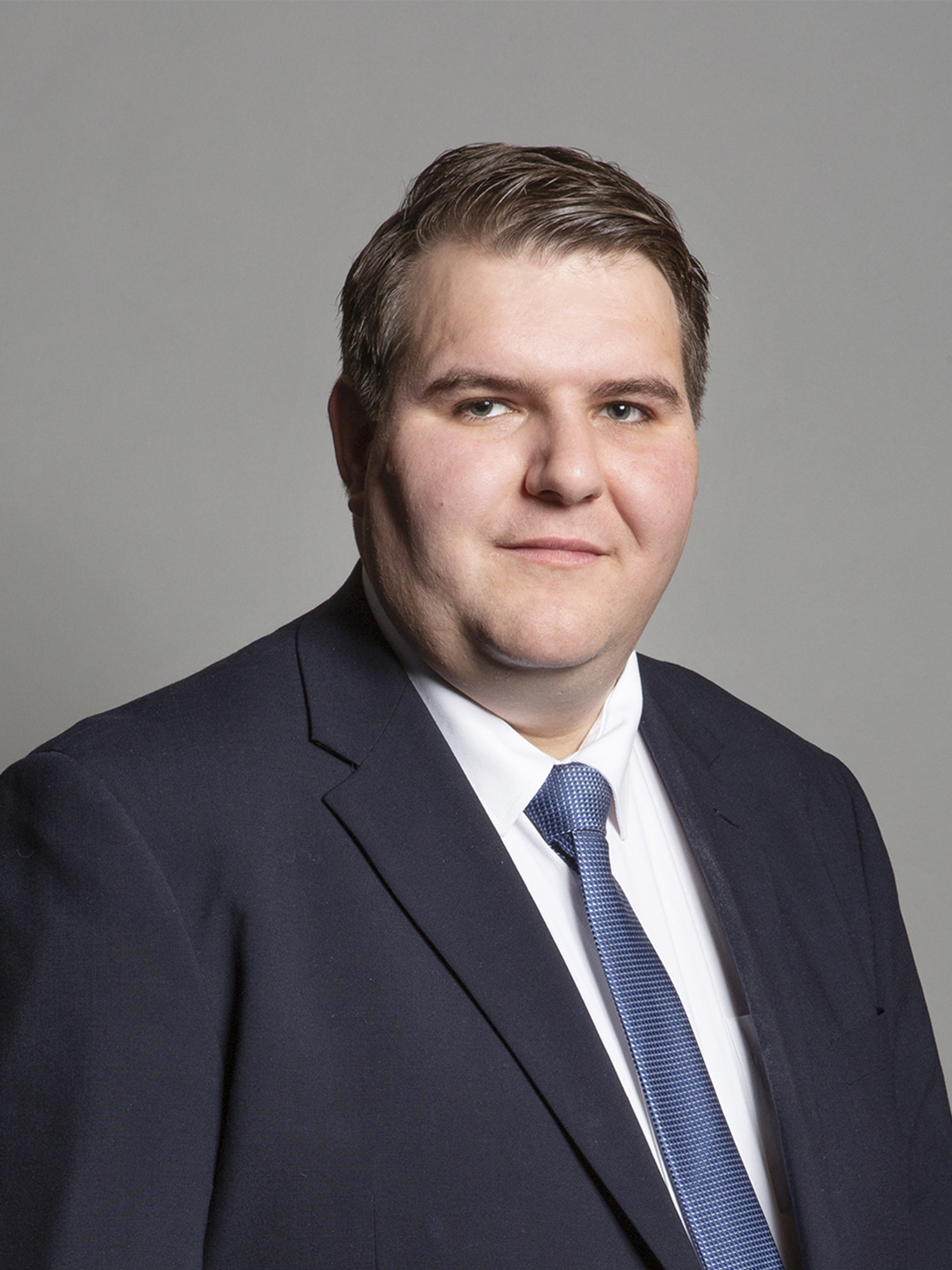
- Official portrait as Jamie Wallis, 2019

Member of Parliament for Bridgend
- In office 12 December 2019 – 30 May 2024
- Preceded by: Madeleine Moon
- Succeeded by: Chris Elmore

Personal details
- Born: 2 June 1984 (age 42) Bettws, Bridgend, Wales
- Party: Conservative
- Education: Brynteg School; Christ Church, Oxford (BA); Cardiff University (PhD)

Katie Wallis (born Jamie Hamilton Wallis, 2 June 1984) is a British Conservative Party politician who served as Member of Parliament (MP) for Bridgend in Wales from the 2019 United Kingdom general election until 2024.

Wallis won the seat by defeating the incumbent, Labour MP Madeleine Moon, who had represented the constituency since 2005, and was succeeded by Chris Elmore, the Labour MP for the neighbouring Ogmore constituency, which was merged into Bridgend in the 2023 boundary review.

Wallis was the first openly transgender member of the Parliament of the United Kingdom, following her statement in March 2022 that "I'm trans. Or to be more accurate, I want to be". While appearing in court in 2025, Wallis stated that "legally I am known as Jamie but I prefer to be known as Katie".

Wallis has been convicted of several driving offences, and of harassing her ex-wife. Her business dealings have come under scrutiny.

== Early life and education ==
Wallis was born in Bettws and attended St Robert's Catholic School in Aberkenfig, St Clare's School in Porthcawl and Brynteg School in Bridgend. She then read chemistry at Christ Church, Oxford, graduating in 2006 with an upper second class degree. In 2014, she was awarded a doctorate in astrobiology from Cardiff University, having studied evidence for cometary panspermia, under the supervision of Chandra Wickramasinghe.

== Career before politics ==
Wallis is one of the owners of a company called Fields Holdings Limited, the parent company of Action Direct (UK) Limited, a former claims management company of which Wallis was a director in 2011 when the Ministry of Justice banned it from taking on any further employment claims work, following an investigation into the company's conduct. She remained a director until February 2012.

In July 2010, a Freedom of Information request (2417) was made to Bridgend County Borough Council asking how many complaints or referrals to Trading Standards had been made about companies linked to her. According to the FoI response, Trading Standards had received 137 complaints about Action Direct (UK) Ltd, 166 about Fields Data Recovery Ltd, 151 about Quickie Divorce Ltd, 26 about Rapid Data Recovery Ltd, seven about Field Associates Ltd and 12 about Injunction Direct UK. The response also listed enforcement visits by Trading Standards against several of Wallis' companies. In January 2020, after being elected to Parliament, Wallis threatened to take legal action against the council over the matter under the Freedom of Information Act. In January 2022, the council stated that it had heard nothing from her lawyer since then.

== Political career ==
Wallis was a member of Pencoed town council, representing the Hendre ward on behalf of the Conservative Party, until 2018, when she was disqualified for non-attendance. She later stated that she had resigned from the council by letter, but the council had not received the letter. She said that her reason for resigning was that she had relocated to Cowbridge, where she joined the town council.

Before she was elected as MP for Bridgend in 2019, she had stood unsuccessfully in Ogmore in the 2017 United Kingdom general election and Ogmore in the 2016 National Assembly for Wales election. At the 2019 general election she defeated incumbent Labour MP Madeleine Moon, who had represented Bridgend since 2005.

An investigation by BuzzFeed in January 2020 found that Wallis had been a co-owner of a 'sugar daddy' dating website, "which offered students financial relationships with wealthy 'sponsors'". Although Wallis initially denied links to the company, Buzzfeed found that she had been a director and shareholder of the site's parent company. The Labour MP Jess Phillips called for Wallis to have the Conservative party whip removed. Since the 2019 election, Wallis has quit as director of at least seven companies.

On the day of the second ballot of MPs in the July 2022 Conservative Party leadership election, Wallis said that she was backing the campaign of Penny Mordaunt. Wallis later called on party leader and prime minister Liz Truss to resign, citing her failure to challenge anti-transgender rhetoric in the election.

In October 2023, Wallis stated that she would not seek re-election to the Bridgend constituency at the next general election, but might seek an alternative constituency outside Wales.

== Personal life ==
=== Gender transition ===
On 30 March 2022, Wallis came out as transgender, becoming the first openly transgender MP in the House of Commons, but continued to use the name Jamie and he/him pronouns "for the time being". In May 2025 while appearing in court, Wallis stated a preference for being referred to as Katie.

She said an individual had outed her to her father and attempted to blackmail Wallis in April 2020; Wallis said the individual was prosecuted, pleaded guilty and was sentenced to two years and nine months' imprisonment.

=== Family ===
At the time of the December 2019 general election, Wallis was married to Rebecca and had two daughters, then aged six and three.

The pair separated in 2020 and divorced in 2024. On 19 May 2025, Katie Wallis pleaded not guilty to charges of harassing her ex-wife between 14 February and 21 March by making unwanted phone calls, sending unwanted messages and voice notes and driving past her home. In June 2025, she pleaded guilty to harassment without violence, admitting to sending the messages and voice note, while the allegation of driving past her ex-wife’s home was removed. On 14 July she was sentenced at Cardiff Magistrates’ Court to a 12-month community order involving 12 days of rehabilitation activity and fined £500 plus £650 costs and a £114 victim surcharge. A restraining order was also imposed for 12 months to prevent Wallis from contact with her ex-wife.

=== Driving offences ===
In February 2022, Wallis was fined £270 and received three points on her driving licence after pleading guilty to an offence in August 2021 of "failure to comply with solid white line road markings" on the A48.

On 28 November 2021, Wallis was arrested on suspicion of driving while unfit after a car collided with a lamppost in Llanblethian, Vale of Glamorgan. On 30 March 2022, she said that she had "fled the scene" of the car collision, while suffering from a form of post-traumatic stress disorder after being raped in September 2021. In April 2022, Wallis was charged with failing to stop following a road traffic collision, failure to report a road traffic collision, careless driving and leaving a vehicle in a dangerous position. In May she pleaded not guilty to the offences. On 11 July 2022 Wallis was found guilty of failing to stop and report an accident, leaving her car in a dangerous position, but cleared of driving without due care and attention. Wallis said she was frightened by a group of people who had come to help her. She was picked up by her father and fell asleep at home without reporting the crash to police. Wallis was fined £2,500 and disqualified from driving for six months. District Judge Tan Ikram said he "didn't find the defendant credible". Following the conviction, the Conservative Party said it "will not be taking any further action".

Parliament of the United Kingdom
| Preceded by Madeleine Moon | Member of parliament for Bridgend; 2019–2024 | Succeeded by Chris Elmore |
