= List of schools in Bridgend County Borough =

This is a list of schools in Bridgend County Borough in Wales.

== Primary Schools ==
- Abercerdin Primary School
- Afon-y-Felin Primary School
- Archdeacon John Lewis Primary School
- Betws Primary School
- Blaengarw Primary School
- Brackla Primary School
- Bryncethin Primary School
- Brynmenyn Primary School
- Bryntirion Infants School
- Bryntirion Junior School
- Caerau Primary School
- Cefn Cribwr Primary School
- Cefn Glas Infants School
- Coety Primary School
- Corneli Primary School
- Coychurch Primary School
- Croesty Primary School
- Cwmfelin Primary School
- Ffaldau Primary School
- Garth Primary School
- Litchard Primary School
- Llangewydd Junior School
- Llangynwyd Primary School
- Maes yr Haul Primary School
- Mynydd Cynffig Infants School
- Mynydd Cynffig Junior School
- Nantyffyllon Primary School
- Nantymoel Primary School
- Newton Primary School
- Nottage Primary School
- Ogmore Vale Primary School
- Oldcastle Primary School
- Pencoed Primary School
- Penybont Primary School
- Penyfai CW Primary School
- Pil Primary School
- Plasnewydd Primary School
- Porthcawl Primary School
- St Mary's & St Patrick's RC Primary School
- St Mary's Bridgend RC Primary School
- St Roberts RC Primary School
- Tondu Primary School
- Trelales Primary School
- Tremains Primary School
- Tynyrheol Primary School
- West Park Primary School
- Ysgol Gymraeg Bro Ogwr
- Ysgol Gynradd Calon y Cymoedd
- Ysgol Gynradd Gymraeg Cynwyd Sant
- Ysgol Y Ferch O'r Sger Corneli

== Secondary schools ==
- Archbishop McGrath Catholic High School
- Brynteg School
- Bryntirion Comprehensive School
- Coleg Cymunedol Y Dderwen
- Cynffig Comprehensive School
- Maesteg Comprehensive School
- Pencoed Comprehensive School
- Porthcawl Comprehensive School
- Ysgol Gyfun Gymraeg Llangynwyd

== Special schools ==
- Heronsbridge School
- Ysgol Bryn Castell

== Independent schools ==
- St Clare's School, Newton
