= Grand Pavilion, Porthcawl =

Theatre in Porthcawl, Wales

Grand Pavilion
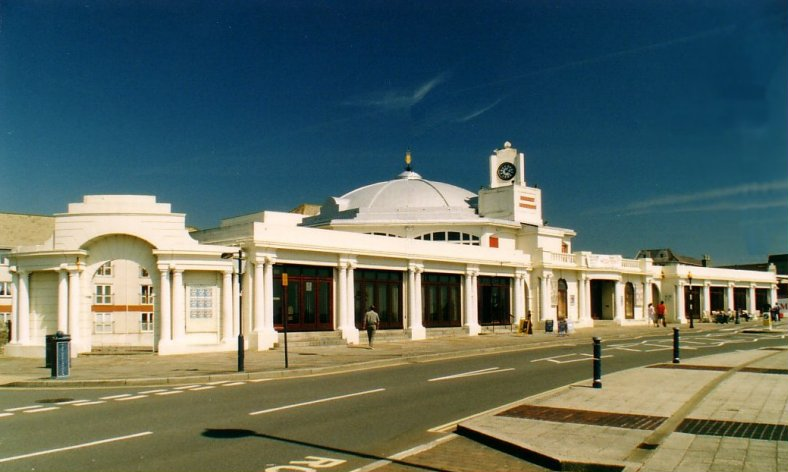
- Interactive map of Grand Pavilion
- Address: Esplanade, Porthcawl, Wales, CF36 3YW
- Coordinates: 51.4766°N 3.7059°W
- Operator: Awen Cultural Trust
- Capacity: 643 (main hall)
- Event: Theatre

Construction
- Groundbreaking: 1931
- Opened: 1 August 1932

Website
- awenboxoffice.com/grand-pavilion

The Grand Pavilion is an entertainment venue in Porthcawl, Bridgend County Borough, Wales, opened on 8 August 1932 by Councillor Russell Mabley J.P., Chairman of P.U.D.C. It has an octagonal dome and extensive frontage, and was originally intended as a Palm Court for hosting tea dances, balls and civic functions.

Construction of the Grand Pavilion commenced in the summer of 1931. The use of ferrocrete throughout – then a relatively new technology – meant that the construction was relatively quick and was completed by August 1932.

The Grand Pavilion hosts a variety of events throughout the year, including live theatre, concerts, ballroom dancing, conferences, dances, and culminating in the ever-popular Christmas pantomime. Recently, names such as Rob Brydon, Eddie Izzard, Elkie Brooks, Cerys Matthews, Hayley Westenra, Katherine Jenkins, Suzi Quatro, Ralph McTell, Joe Pasquale, and Gerry & The Pacemakers have all appeared on the Pavilion's stage. In 1957, a US Government travel ban prevented Paul Robeson from appearing in person at the Miners' Eisteddfod. However, he still performed live via a secretly arranged transatlantic telephone link up. Fifty years on, in 2007, the Grand Pavilion celebrated its golden jubilee with a concert featuring Sir Willard White.

The Grand Pavilion is also a conference venue, and hosts civil wedding ceremonies, receptions and parties.

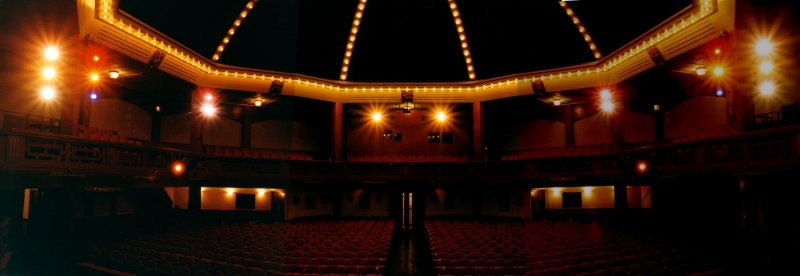
The auditorium

The main hall features a fully equipped stage, and has a theatre seating capacity of 643. The hall also boasts one of the finest sprung dance floors in South Wales. The octagonal floor is regularly used for ballroom dancing classes and tea dances.

Originally named the "lesser hall" (and subsequently the "Jubilee Room") the basement of the Pavilion houses a refurbished performance space now named "The Stage Door", which plays host to regular comedy nights, folk and jazz nights, dance classes, theatre workshops, conferences and meetings. The Cafe Bar hosts its own series of events, such as Jazz, Chill-out sessions, Literary speaking and an Art Forum. Several metres to the west is the Seabank Hotel.
