= Win Griffiths =

British politician

Win Griffiths OBE
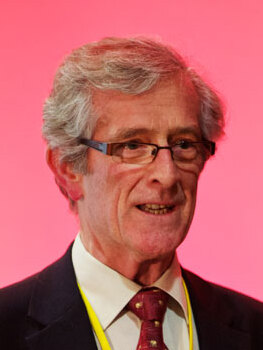
- Griffiths in 2012

Member of Parliament for Bridgend
- In office 11 June 1987 – 11 April 2005
- Preceded by: Peter Hubbard-Miles
- Succeeded by: Madeleine Moon

Member of the European Parliament for South Wales
- In office 10 June 1979 – 15 June 1989
- Preceded by: Constituency Created
- Succeeded by: Wayne David

Parliamentary Under-Secretary of State for Wales
- In office May 1997 – 29 July 1998; Alongside Peter Hain
- Preceded by: Gwilym Jones & Jonathan Evans
- Succeeded by: Jon Owen Jones

Personal details
- Born: 11 February 1943 (age 83)
- Party: Labour
- Spouse: Elizabeth Ceri Gravell (m. 1966)
- Children: 2

Winston James Griffiths, OBE (born 11 February 1943), known as Win Griffiths, is a Welsh politician and former teacher who served in both the European Parliament and the House of Commons. A member of the Labour Party, he represented South Wales in the European Parliament from 1979 to 1989 and Bridgend in the House of Commons from 1987 to 2005.

During his parliamentary career, Griffiths held several front bench positions in opposition and served as Parliamentary Under-Secretary of State for Wales under Tony Blair from May 1997 to July 1998. Following his retirement from Parliament in 2005, he continued his public service through various healthcare and voluntary sector roles, and was appointed an OBE in the 2011 New Year Honours.

== Early life and education ==
Winston James Griffiths was born on 11 February 1943, the son of Evan George Griffiths and Rachel Elizabeth Griffiths. He was educated at Brecon Boys' Grammar School before attending the University College of Wales, Cardiff, where he graduated in 1965 with a bachelor of arts degree and diploma of education.

Before entering politics, Griffiths worked as a teacher.

== Political career ==
=== European Parliament (1979–1989) ===
Griffiths began his political career in 1979 when he was elected as Member of the European Parliament for the newly created South Wales constituency. He served in this role for ten years until 1989, when he was succeeded by Wayne David. During this time, from 1984 to 1987, he was a Vice-President of the Parliament.

=== House of Commons (1987–2005) ===
In 1987, whilst still serving as an MEP, Griffiths was elected to the House of Commons as the Member of Parliament for Bridgend, succeeding Peter Hubbard-Miles. He held the seat for 18 years until his retirement in 2005.

During his time in Parliament, Griffiths held numerous front bench roles whilst Labour was in opposition. Following Labour's victory in the 1997 general election, he was appointed as Parliamentary Under-Secretary of State for Wales in the Welsh Office by Prime Minister Tony Blair in May 1997, serving alongside Peter Hain. However, his ministerial career was brief, ending with the government reshuffle in July 1998.

After leaving government, Griffiths continued to play an active role in parliamentary affairs, notably chairing the Welsh Grand Committee. He announced his retirement from Parliament and stood down at the 2005 general election, when he was succeeded by Madeleine Moon.

== Post-parliamentary career ==
Following his retirement from Parliament in 2005, Griffiths remained active in public service. He took up the position of chair of Bro Morgannwg NHS Trust and later became chairman of the Wales Council for Voluntary Action.

In recognition of his public service, Griffiths was appointed an Officer of the Order of the British Empire (OBE) in the 2011 New Year Honours list.

== Personal life ==
Griffiths married Elizabeth Ceri Gravell on 22 August 1966. The couple have two children: a son and a daughter.

== Offices Held ==
European Parliament
Preceded by (new post)	Member of European Parliament for South Wales; 1979–1989	Succeeded by Wayne David
Parliament of the United Kingdom
Preceded by Peter Hubbard-Miles	Member of Parliament for Bridgend; 1987–2005	Succeeded by Madeleine Moon
