= South Wales (European Parliament constituency) =

Former European Parliament constituency

- European Parliament constituency
- Boundary within Wales (1979-1984)
- Member state: United Kingdom
- Created: 1979
- Dissolved: 1994
- MEPs: 1

Boundary within Wales (1984-1994)

South Wales was a European Parliament constituency covering south central Wales, including the city of Cardiff.

Prior to its uniform adoption of proportional representation in 1999, the United Kingdom used first-past-the-post for the European elections in England, Scotland and Wales. The European Parliament constituencies used under that system were smaller than the later regional constituencies and only had one Member of the European Parliament each.

The constituency was replaced by most of South Wales Central and part of South Wales West in 1994. These seats became part of the much larger Wales constituency in 1999.

== Boundaries ==
1979-1984: Aberavon, Barry, Cardiff North, Cardiff North West, Cardiff South East, Cardiff West, Neath, Ogmore, Pontypridd.

1984-1994: Aberavon, Bridgend, Cardiff Central, Cardiff North, Cardiff South and Penarth, Cardiff West, Ogmore, Pontypridd, Vale of Glamorgan.

== Members of the European Parliament ==
Elected	Name	Party
1979	Win Griffiths	Labour
1989	Wayne David	Labour
1994	Constituency abolished	

== Results ==
European Parliament election, 1979: South Wales
Party	Candidate	Votes	%	±%
Labour	Win Griffiths	77,784	44.1	
Conservative	Stefan Terlezki	66,852	37.9	
Liberal	J. C. Greaves	17,811	10.1	
Plaid Cymru	D. J. Williams	14,029	7.9	
Majority		10,932	6.2	
Turnout		176,476	32.9	
Labour win (new seat)				

European Parliament election, 1984: South Wales
Party	Candidate	Votes	%	±%
Labour	Win Griffiths	99,936	51.1	+7.0
Conservative	Miss Jackie R. Pattman	55,678	28.5	−9.4
Liberal	Mrs. Joan D. Davies	26,588	13.6	+3.5
Plaid Cymru	Dr. Dafydd J. L. Hughes	13,201	6.8	−1.1
Majority		44,258	22.6	
Turnout		195,403	38.4	
Labour hold		Swing		

European Parliament election, 1989: South Wales
Party	Candidate	Votes	%	±%
Labour	Wayne David	108,550	54.7	+3.6
Conservative	Andrew R. Taylor	45,993	23.2	−5.3
Green	Graham P. Jones	25,993	13.1	New
Plaid Cymru	Peter J. Keelan	10,727	5.4	−1.4
SLD	Prabhat K. Verma	4,037	2.0	−11.6
SDP	D. A. T. (Terry) Thomas	3,153	1.6	New
Majority		62,557	31.5	+8.9
Turnout		198,453	38.1	−0.3
Labour hold		Swing		
