= South Wales Central (European Parliament constituency) =

Former European Parliament constituency

- European Parliament constituency
- Boundary within Wales (1994-1999)
- Member state: United Kingdom
- Created: 1994
- Dissolved: 1999
- MEPs: 1

South Wales Central was a European Parliament constituency covering south central Wales, including the city of Cardiff.

Prior to its uniform adoption of proportional representation in 1999, the United Kingdom used first-past-the-post for the European elections in England, Scotland and Wales. The European Parliament constituencies used under that system were smaller than the later regional constituencies and only had one Member of the European Parliament each.

The constituency consisted of the Westminster Parliament constituencies (on their 1983 boundaries) of Cardiff Central, Cardiff North, Cardiff South and Penarth, Cardiff West, Cynon Valley, Pontypridd, Rhondda, and Vale of Glamorgan.

The constituency replaced most of South Wales and the Cynon Valley area of South Wales East in 1994 and became part of the much larger Wales constituency in 1999.

== Members of the European Parliament ==
Elected	Name	Party
1994	Wayne David	Labour

== Results ==
European Parliament election, 1994: South Wales Central
Party	Candidate	Votes	%	±%
Labour	Wayne David	115,396	61.4	
Conservative	Mrs. Lynn A. Verity	29,340	15.6	
Plaid Cymru	Gareth O. Llywelyn	18,857	10.0	
Liberal Democrats	A. J. (John) Dixon	18,471	9.8	
Green	Christopher J. von Ruhland	4,002	2.1	
Communist	Robert D. Griffiths	1,073	0.6	
Natural Law	Gabriel Duguay	889	0.5	
Majority		86,056	45.8	
Turnout		188,028	39.4	
Labour win (new seat)				
