= Wayne David =

Welsh Labour politician (born 1957)

Sir Wayne David
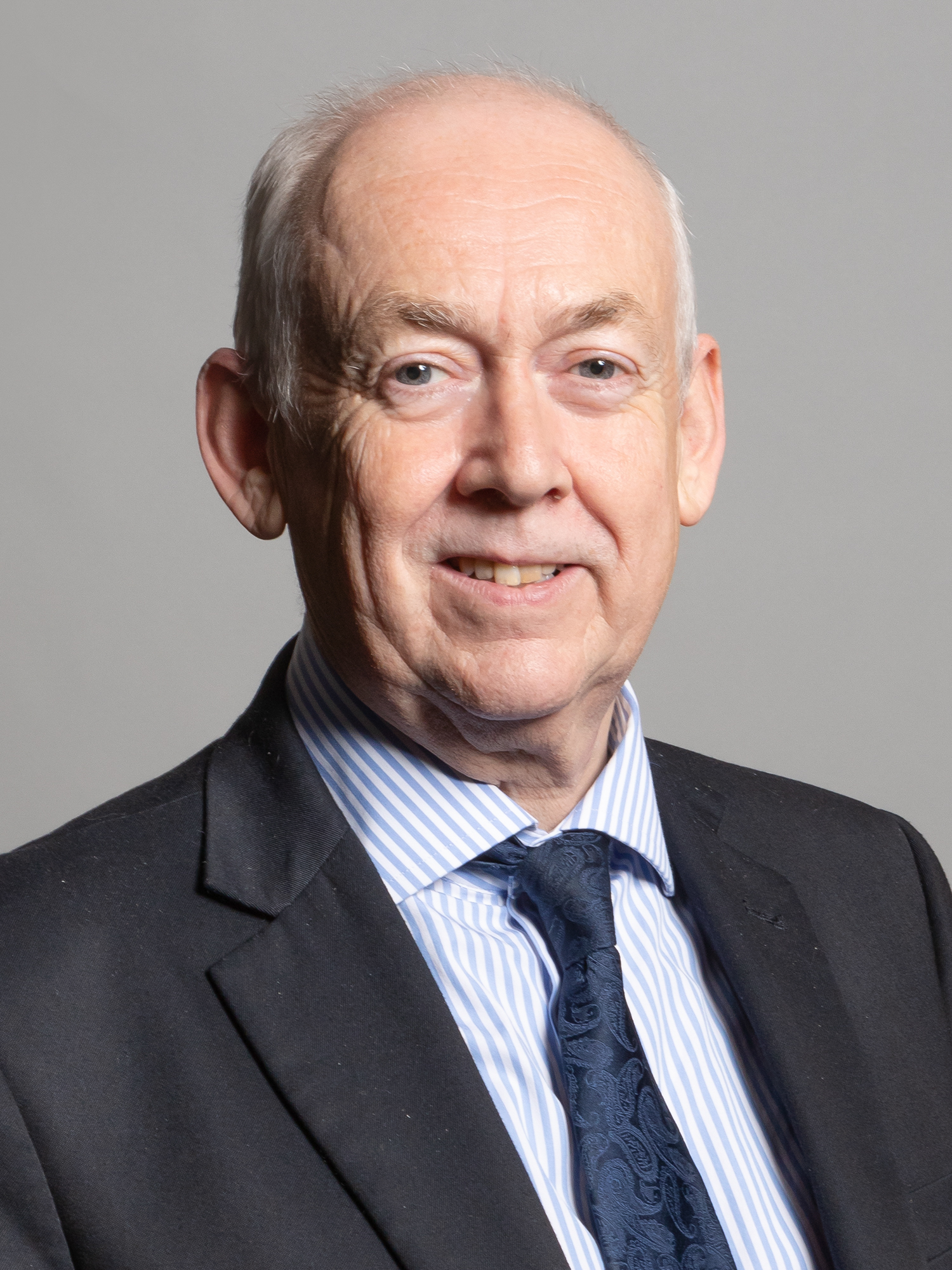
- Official portrait, 2020

Parliamentary Under-Secretary of State for Wales
- In office 5 October 2008 – 11 May 2010
- Prime Minister: Gordon Brown
- Preceded by: Huw Irranca-Davies
- Succeeded by: David Jones

Member of Parliament for Caerphilly
- In office 7 June 2001 – 30 May 2024
- Preceded by: Ron Davies
- Succeeded by: Chris Evans

Leader of the European Parliamentary Labour Party
- In office 1994–1998
- Party Leader: Tony Blair
- Preceded by: Pauline Green
- Succeeded by: Alan Donnelly

Member of the European Parliament for South Wales Central South Wales (1989–1994)
- In office 15 June 1989 – 10 June 1999
- Preceded by: Win Griffiths
- Succeeded by: Constituency abolished

Personal details
- Born: 1 July 1957 (age 69) Bridgend, Wales
- Party: Labour
- Spouses: Catherine Thomas (m. 1991; div. 2007); Jayne Edwards (m. 2016)
- Education: University College, Cardiff (BA, PGCE); University College, Swansea

Sir Wayne David (born 1 July 1957) is a Welsh politician who served as Member of Parliament (MP) for Caerphilly from 2001 to 2024. A member of the Labour Party, he was Leader of the European Parliamentary Labour Party from 1994 to 1998. As a Member of the European Parliament, he represented South Wales from 1989 to 1994 and South Wales Central from 1994 to 1999.

David served in government as an Assistant Whip from 2007 to 2008 and Parliamentary Under-Secretary of State for Wales from 2008 to 2010. He was a Shadow Minister under every Leader of the Opposition from 2010 to 2021, and Parliamentary Private Secretary to Ed Miliband during his tenure in the role. He was ranked as the best MP in the United Kingdom by constituents in Change.org's People-Power Index in 2019. He was knighted in the 2024 Birthday Honours for Parliamentary and political service.

== Early life and education ==
Wayne David was born in Bridgend, the son of a teacher and grandson of a coal miner. He grew up in the village of Cefn Cribwr and later attended Cynffig Comprehensive School before attending Cardiff University, where he was awarded a BA in History and Welsh History in 1979. After studying Economic History at Swansea University, he returned to Cardiff and qualified as a teacher in 1983 with a PGCE from University College Cardiff. He was awarded the Charles Morgan Prize for Welsh history in 1979.

== Professional career ==
David taught history at the Brynteg Comprehensive School, Bridgend from 1983 to 1985, when he left to work for the Workers' Educational Association. He became the chairman of War on Want Cymru in 1987, stepping aside in 1989. He joined the United Nations Association's Cardiff branch in 1989.

== Political career ==
David was an elected representative on the Welsh Executive of the Labour Party from 1981 to 1982 and 1986 to 1989. He was served as a councillor to the Cefn Cribwr Community Council in 1985, and was its chairman from 1986 until 1990. He was a member of the Labour Party National Executive Committee from 1994 to 1998.

=== European Parliament ===
David was elected as Member of the European Parliament for South Wales in 1989, and re-elected to South Wales Central in 1994 following constituency boundary changes. He served as Leader of the European Parliamentary Labour Party from 1994 to 1998, and was previously treasurer of the group from 1989 to 1991.

He stood down as an MEP to contest the Rhondda in the first National Assembly for Wales elections in 1999. David lost to the Plaid Cymru candidate by over 2,000 votes.

=== UK Parliament ===
David was first elected to the House of Commons at the 2001 general election, when he was elected as MP for Caerphilly with 58.2% of the vote and a majority of 14,425. He made his maiden speech on 17 June 2001, in which he called for a new hospital in his constituency.

David was a member of the European Scrutiny Committee from 2001 to 2007. In 2005, he was appointed as Parliamentary Private Secretary (PPS) to the Ministry of Defence team and then subsequently to Adam Ingram, Minister of State for the Armed Forces. He resigned as a PPS on 6 September 2006, along with a number of others, citing Prime Minister Tony Blair's refusal to name a departure date.

At the 2005 general election, David was re-elected as MP for Caerphilly, with a decreased vote share of 56.6% and an increased majority of 15,359.

After Gordon Brown became Prime Minister, David was appointed as an Assistant Whip to the Department for Work and Pensions and Wales Office in July 2007. Following the October 2008 government reshuffle, he was promoted to Parliamentary Under-Secretary of State for Wales.

At the 2010 general election, David was again re-elected, with a decreased vote share of 44.9% and a decreased majority of 10,755.

Following Labour's defeat at the 2010 general election, he served as Shadow Wales Minister from May to October 2010. David was appointed Shadow Europe Minister in October 2011. He served as Shadow Political and Constitutional Reform Minister from October 2011 until October 2013, when he became PPS to opposition leader Ed Miliband alongside Karen Buck. At the 2015 general election, David was again re-elected with a decreased vote share of 44.3% and a decreased majority of 10,073.

In July 2015, he was appointed to shadow the Cabinet Office, Scotland Office, and Justice Department with three portfolios; Political and Constitutional Reform, Scotland, and Youth Justice. David was re-appointed to the roles by Labour Leader Jeremy Corbyn in September 2015, but resigned the following June after losing confidence in his leadership. He supported Owen Smith in the 2016 Labour leadership election.

David re-joined the Corbyn's front bench in October 2016 as Shadow Armed Forces and Defence Procurement Minister. He was re-elected at the snap 2017 general election, with an increased vote share of 54.5% and an increased majority of 12,078. He was again re-elected at the 2019 general election, with a decreased vote share of 44.9% and a decreased majority of 6,833.

David briefly departed the front bench from January until April 2020, when he became Shadow Middle East and North Africa Minister. He stood down from the position in December 2021, and announced in February 2022 his intention to retire at the 2024 general election. He chose not to seek re-election due to his age. He returned to the position of Shadow Middle East and North Africa Minister in June 2023.

David is a member of Labour Friends of Israel.

He stood down as an MP at the 2024 general election.

=== Special Advisor ===
In 2025 he replaced former Labour MP Kevin Brenan as Chief Special Adviser to First Minister Eluned Morgan. He stepped down on 25 July 2025 for health reasons saying there was "no political reason whatsoever" for his resignation.

== Personal life ==
David was to married Catherine Thomas from 1991 until their divorce in 2007. Thomas was employed by David during his tenure in the European Parliament, and later served as a Welsh Assembly member. He married Jayne Edwards in 2016.

== Publications ==
- Building on Maastricht: A Left Agenda for Europe by Wayne David, 1993, Tribune Group of Euro MPs
- Going Forward in Europe by Wayne David, 1994
- Contributor to The Future of Europe: Problems and Issues for the Twenty-First Century by Wayne David, 1996, St. Martin's Press, ISBN 0-333-66600-3
- Remaining True: A biography of Ness Edwards by Wayne David, Foreword by Neil Kinnock, 2006, Published by the Caerphilly Local History Society, ISBN 0-9542782-1-6

European Parliament
| Preceded by Win Griffiths | Member of European Parliament for South Wales Central; 1989–1999 | Constituency abolished |
Parliament of the United Kingdom
| Preceded by Ron Davies | Member of Parliament for Caerphilly; 2001–2024 | Succeeded by Chris Evans |
Political offices
| Preceded by Mark Francois | Shadow Minister for Europe; 2010–2011 | Succeeded by Emma Reynolds |
| Preceded by Kate Hollern | Shadow Minister for the Armed Forces; 2016–2020 | Succeeded by Khalid Mahmood |
Party political offices
| Preceded by Pauline Green | Leader of the European Parliamentary Labour Party; 1994–1998 | Succeeded by Alan Donnelly |
