= Madeleine Moon =

British Labour politician

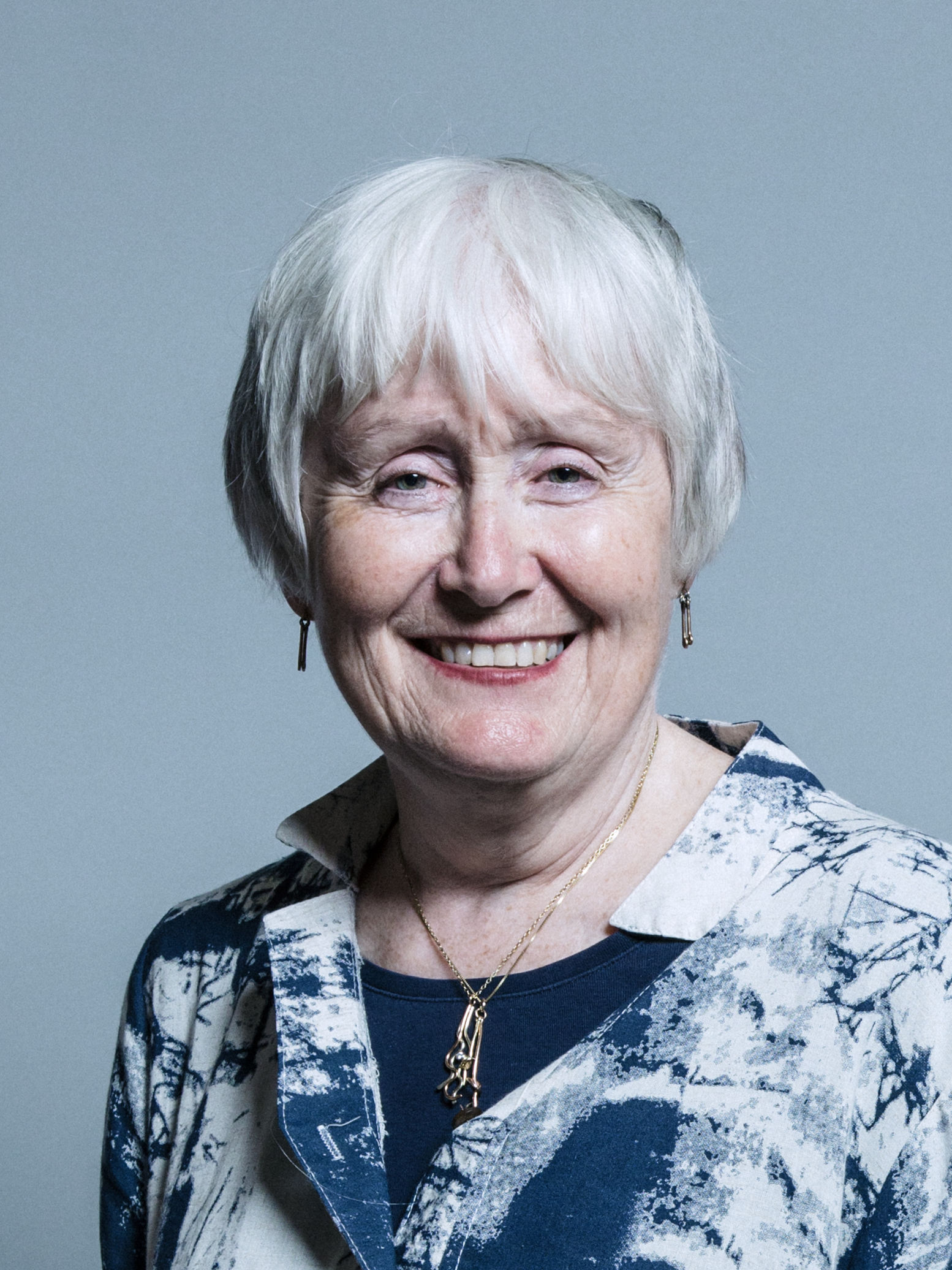
- Official portrait, 2017

President of the NATO Parliamentary Assembly
- In office 19 November 2018 – 16 December 2019
- Preceded by: Rasa Juknevičienė
- Succeeded by: Attila Mesterházy

Member of Parliament for Bridgend
- In office 5 May 2005 – 6 November 2019
- Preceded by: Win Griffiths
- Succeeded by: Katie Wallis

Personal details
- Born: 27 March 1950 (age 76) Sunderland, County Durham, England
- Party: Labour
- Spouse: Steve Moon (m. 1983; died 2015)
- Children: Dr David Moon
- Education: Keele University
- Profession: Social worker

Madeleine Moon (born 27 March 1950) is a British Labour Party politician, who was the Member of Parliament (MP) for Bridgend from 2005 to 2019, when she lost her seat to the Welsh Conservative candidate Katie Wallis.

== Early life ==
Born in North East England, Madeleine attended Whinney Hill Secondary Modern Girls' School (now part of Durham Johnston Comprehensive School) then Durham Girls' Grammar School (became the sixth form of Durham Gilesgate Sports College and Sixth Form Centre). She went to Madeley College of Education (later part of North Staffordshire Polytechnic), gaining a Cert Ed in 1971, then Keele University, where she gained a BEd in 1972. From University College, Cardiff she gained a CQSW and Diploma in Social Work (DipSW) in 1980.

She worked in social services for Mid Glamorgan County Council from 1980 to 1996, then for Swansea Council from 1996 to 2002.

She launched Crossroads (a charity that supports carers) in Porthcawl. She represented Bridgend Council on the Sports Council for Wales, on Tourism South and West Wales and was National Chair of the British Resorts Association from 1999 to 2001.

== Parliamentary career ==
Moon has lived and worked around Bridgend for over 29 years, is a former mayor of Porthcawl and was a councillor for Porthcawl for 13 years. She was elected MP for the Bridgend constituency at the 2005 general election.

Madeleine Moon was Parliamentary Private Secretary (PPS) to Lord Drayson, Minister for Science in the Department for Science, Innovation and Skills.

In 2007 and 2008, Moon received a higher public profile due to an increased number of suicides of young people in her constituency. She agreed with South Wales Police that the suicides are not connected but has been critical of media coverage.

Madeleine Moon has written and spoken extensively on prison reform and policing. In 2014 she called for the armed forces to overhaul their policies on investigating bullying.

She supported Owen Smith in the failed attempt to replace Jeremy Corbyn in the 2016 Labour leadership election.

In November 2018 she was elected in Halifax, Nova Scotia as President of the NATO Parliamentary Assembly. She also became a member of the UK Delegation to the Assembly in 2010.

She stood in the 2019 general election but lost her seat to Conservative Jamie Wallis.

=== Expenses ===
The Daily Telegraph, which extensively covered MPs' expenses during the United Kingdom parliamentary expenses scandal, reported that Moon had claimed for furniture items bought near her primary residence in Wales; claims are allowed for her second home in London but not for her primary residence in Wales. She said that the furniture, though bought in Wales, was indeed for her second home in London.

== Personal life ==
She married the ecologist Steve Moon in 1983 in Ogwr, Mid Glamorgan; the couple had one son David, born in May 1984. Her husband died in March 2015.

Parliament of the United Kingdom
Preceded by Win Griffiths	Member of Parliament for Bridgend; 2005–2019	Succeeded by Katie Wallis
