= Viggo Stoltenberg-Hansen =

Swedish mathematician

Viggo Stoltenberg-Hansen, born 1942, professor at Uppsala University, Department of Mathematics, is a Swedish mathematician/logician and expert on domain theory and recursion theory (also known as computability theory). Viggo received his PhD in Mathematics (titled "On Priority Arguments In Friedberg Theories") from University of Toronto in 1973.

== Work on domain theory ==
Viggo Stoltenberg-Hansen and John Tucker developed in the early 1980s a general method of domain representations of topological algebras.

Viggo is the main author of the textbook "Mathematical Theory of Domains", Cambridge University Press, 1994 (coauthored by I. Lindström and E. Griffor), and also of a set of Marktoberdorf summer school lecture notes on domain theory.

== Work on effective domains ==
Viggo Stoltenberg-Hansen and John Tucker made a thorough analysis of the computability associated to effective algebras and continuity of homomorphisms between such.

== Some References ==
1. V Stoltenberg-Hansen and J V Tucker, Effective algebras, in S Abramsky, D Gabbay and T Maibaum (eds.), Handbook of Logic in Computer Science, Volume IV: Semantic Modelling, Oxford University Press (1995), pp357–526.
2. V Stoltenberg-Hansen and J V Tucker, Computable rings and fields, in E Griffor (ed.), Handbook of Computability Theory, Elsevier (1999), pp363–447.
