= Bridgend (UK Parliament constituency) =

UK Parliament constituency (since 1983)

Coordinates: 51.503°N 3.639°W

- County constituency for the House of Commons
- Interactive map of the constituency.
- Location of the constituency within Wales
- Preserved county: Mid Glamorgan
- Population: 79,873 (2011 census)
- Electorate: 70,770 (March 2020)
- Major settlements: Bridgend, Porthcawl, Pencoed

Current constituency
- Created: 1983
- Member of Parliament: Chris Elmore (Labour)
- Seats: One
- Created from: Aberavon and Ogmore

Overlaps
- Senedd: Pen-y-bont Bro Morgannwg

Bridgend (Welsh: Pen-y-bont ar Ogwr) is a constituency (Note: A borough constituency (for the purposes of election expenses and type of returning officer)) represented in the House of Commons of the UK Parliament since 2024 by Chris Elmore of the Labour Party. (Note: As with all constituencies, the constituency elects one Member of Parliament (MP) by the first past the post system of election at least every five years.)

The constituency retained its name but had its boundaries altered as part of the 2023 review of Westminster constituencies carried out by the Boundary Commission for Wales for the 2024 general election.

== Boundaries ==
1983–1997: The Borough of Ogwr wards numbers 1, 2, 12 to 16, 18, and 20 to 23.

1997–2010: The Borough of Ogwr wards of Brackla, Cefn Cribwr, Coity Higher, Cornelly, Coychurch Lower, Laleston, Morfa, Newcastle, Newcastle Higher, Oldcastle, Porthcawl East, Porthcawl West, Pyle, and St Bride's Major.

Map of boundaries 2010–2024

2010–2024: The Bridgend County Borough electoral divisions of Brackla; Bryntirion, Laleston and Merthyr Mawr; Cefn Glas; Coity; Cornelly; Coychurch Lower; Litchard; Llangewydd and Brynhyfryd; Morfa; Newcastle; Newton; Nottage; Oldcastle; Pendre; Pen-y-fai; Porthcawl East Central; Porthcawl West Central; Pyle; and Rest Bay.

2024–present: Under the 2023 review, the constituency was defined as being composed of the following wards of the County Borough of Bridgend, as they existed on 1 December 2020:

- Aberkenfig; Brackla; Bryncethin; Bryncoch; Bryntirion, Laleston and Merthyr Mawr; Cefn Cribwr; Cefn Glas; Coity; Coychurch Lower; Felindre; Hendre; Litchard; Llangewydd and Brynhyfryd; Morfa; Newcastle; Newton; Nottage; Oldcastle; Pendre; Penprysg; Pen-y-fai; Porthcawl East Central; Porthcawl West Central; Rest Bay; Sarn; Ynysawdre.

As a result of the review, the seat was expanded into parts of the abolished constituency of Ogmore, including the communities of Aberkenfig, St Bride's Minor, Ynysawdre and Pencoed. This was partly offset by the transfer of Cornelly and Pyle to the new constituency of Aberafan Maesteg.

Following a local government boundary review which came into effect in May 2022, the constituency now comprises the following wards of the County Borough of Bridgend from the 2024 general election:

- Aberkenfig; Brackla East and Coychurch Lower; Brackla East Central; Brackla West; Brackla West Central; Bridgend Central; Bryntyrion, Laleston and Merthyr Mawr; Cefn Glas; Coity Higher; Newton; Nottage; Oldcastle; Pencoed and Penprysg; Pen-y-Fai; Porthcawl East Central; Porthcawl West Central; Pyle, Kenfig Hill and Cefn Cribwr (part); Rest Bay; and St Bride's Minor and Ynysawdre.

== Constituency profile ==
The seat covers Bridgend itself and some of the south Wales coast to the west including the seaside resort of Porthcawl. Levels of wealth and education are around average for the UK.

== History ==
Summary of results

The 2015 result gave the seat the 19th-smallest majority of Labour's 232 seats by percentage of majority. The Bridgend constituency was created in 1983 from parts of the seats of Ogmore and Aberavon. To date, it has mostly voted for candidates from the Labour Party at general elections. The exceptions have been the Conservatives winning the seat at the 1983 "landslide" election, and in 2019. An absolute Labour majority occurred in Bridgend in three successive elections: 1992, 1997, and 2001, as well as in 2017.

Other opposition parties

Since 2001, inclusive, two non-Labour, non-Conservative candidates at each election have kept their deposits, winning greater than or equal to 5% of the vote.

Turnout

Turnout has ranged between a high of 80.5%, in 1992, and a low of 59.2% in 2005.

== Members of Parliament ==
Election	Member	Party
1983	Peter Hubbard-Miles	Conservative
1987	Win Griffiths	Labour
2005	Madeleine Moon	Labour
2019	Jamie Wallis	Conservative
2024	Chris Elmore	Labour

== Elections ==
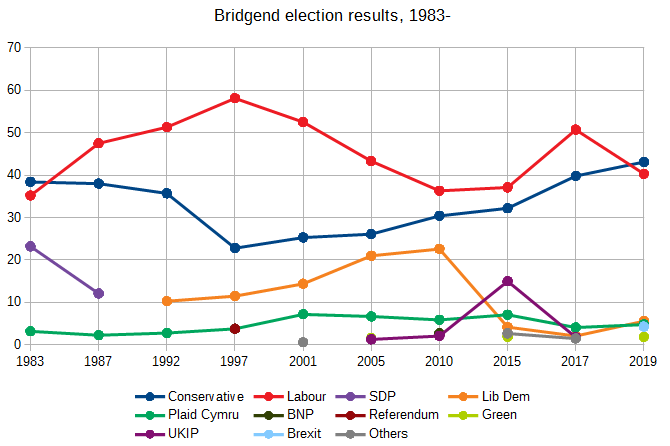
Bridgend election results

=== Elections in the 2020s ===
General election 2024: Bridgend
Party	Candidate	Votes	%	±%
Labour	Chris Elmore	16,516	39.9	+1.4
Reform	Caroline Jones	7,921	19.1	+13.9
Conservative	Anita Boateng	6,764	16.3	−27.7
Plaid Cymru	Iolo Caudy	3,629	8.8	+3.6
Independent	Mark John	3,338	8.1	N/A
Green	Debra Cooper	1,760	4.3	+2.4
Liberal Democrats	Claire Waller	1,446	3.5	−1.8
Rejected ballots		108		
Majority		8,595	20.8	N/A
Turnout		41,374	56.6	▼9.4
Registered electors		73,152		
Labour gain from Conservative		Swing	▲14.5	

=== Elections in the 2010s ===
2019 notional result (Note: Estimate of the 2019 general election result as if the revised boundaries recommended under the 2023 boundary review were in place)
Party	Vote	%
Conservative	20,531	44.0
Labour	17,978	38.5
Liberal Democrats	2,453	5.3
Plaid Cymru	2,441	5.2
Brexit Party	2,437	5.2
Green Party	868	1.9
Majority	2,553	5.5
Turnout	46,708	66.0
Electorate	70,770	

General election 2019: Bridgend
Party	Candidate	Votes	%	±%
Conservative	Katie Wallis	18,193	43.1	+3.3
Labour	Madeleine Moon	17,036	40.3	–10.4
Liberal Democrats	Jonathan Pratt	2,368	5.6	+3.5
Plaid Cymru	Leanne Lewis	2,013	4.8	+0.7
Brexit Party	Robert Morgan	1,811	4.3	N/A
Green	Alex Harris	815	1.9	N/A
Rejected ballots		101		
Majority		1,157	2.8	N/A
Turnout		42,236	66.7	–2.9
Registered electors		63,303		
Conservative gain from Labour		Swing	+6.9	

Of the 101 rejected ballots:

- 78 were either unmarked or it was uncertain who the vote was for.
- 23 voted for more than one candidate.

General election 2017: Bridgend
Party	Candidate	Votes	%	±%
Labour	Madeleine Moon	21,913	50.7	+13.6
Conservative	Karen Robson	17,213	39.8	+7.6
Plaid Cymru	Rhys Watkins	1,783	4.1	−3.0
Liberal Democrats	Jonathan Pratt	919	2.1	−2.1
UKIP	Alun Williams	781	1.8	−13.2
Independent	Isabel Robson	646	1.5	N/A
Rejected ballots		55		
Majority		4,700	10.9	+6.0
Turnout		43,255	69.6	+3.8
Registered electors		62,185		
Labour hold		Swing	+3.0	

Of the 55 rejected ballots:

- 36 were either unmarked or it was uncertain who the vote was for.
- 19 voted for more than one candidate.

General election 2015: Bridgend
Party	Candidate	Votes	%	±%
Labour	Madeleine Moon	14,624	37.1	+0.8
Conservative	Meirion Jenkins	12,697	32.2	+1.8
UKIP	Caroline Jones	5,911	15.0	+12.9
Plaid Cymru	James Radcliffe	2,784	7.1	+1.2
Liberal Democrats	Anita Davies	1,648	4.2	−18.4
Independent	Les Morris	763	1.9	N/A
Green	Tony White	736	1.9	N/A
TUSC	Aaron David	118	0.3	N/A
Pirate	David Elston	106	0.3	N/A
National Front	Adam Lloyd	66	0.2	N/A
Rejected ballots		63		
Majority		1,927	4.9	−1.0
Turnout		39,453	65.8	+0.5
Registered electors		59,998		
Labour hold		Swing	−0.5	

Of the 63 rejected ballots:

- 43 were either unmarked or it was uncertain who the vote was for.
- 18 voted for more than one candidate.
- 2 had writing or mark by which the voter could be identified.

General election 2010: Bridgend
Party	Candidate	Votes	%	±%
Labour	Madeleine Moon	13,931	36.3	−6.6
Conservative	Helen Baker	11,668	30.4	+5.4
Liberal Democrats	Wayne Morgan	8,658	22.6	+0.5
Plaid Cymru	Nicholas Thomas	2,269	5.9	−1.0
BNP	Brian Urch	1,020	2.7	N/A
UKIP	Dave Fulton	801	2.1	+0.9
Majority		2,263	5.9	–11.3
Turnout		38,347	65.3	+5.6
Registered electors		58,700		
Labour hold		Swing	−6.0	

=== Elections in the 2000s ===
General election 2005: Bridgend
Party	Candidate	Votes	%	±%
Labour	Madeleine Moon	16,410	43.3	−9.2
Conservative	Helen Baker	9,887	26.1	+0.8
Liberal Democrats	Paul Warren	7,949	21.0	+6.6
Plaid Cymru	Gareth Clubb	2,527	6.7	−0.5
Green	Jonathan Spink	595	1.6	N/A
UKIP	Kunnathur Rajan	491	1.3	N/A
Majority		6,523	17.2	–10.0
Turnout		37,859	59.2	−1.0
Registered electors		63,936		
Labour hold		Swing	−5.0	

General election 2001: Bridgend
Party	Candidate	Votes	%	±%
Labour	Win Griffiths	19,423	52.5	−5.6
Conservative	Tania Brisby	9,377	25.3	+2.5
Liberal Democrats	Jean Barraclough	5,330	14.4	+2.9
Plaid Cymru	Monica Mahoney	2,653	7.2	+3.4
ProLife Alliance	Sara Jeremy	223	0.6	N/A
Majority		10,046	27.2	−8.1
Turnout		37,006	60.2	−12.1
Registered electors		61,496		
Labour hold		Swing	−4.0	

=== Elections in the 1990s ===
General election 1997: Bridgend
Party	Candidate	Votes	%	±%
Labour	Win Griffiths	25,115	58.1	+6.8
Conservative	David Davies	9,867	22.8	−12.9
Liberal Democrats	Andrew Mckinlay	4,968	11.5	+1.2
Referendum	Tudor Greaves	1,662	3.8	N/A
Plaid Cymru	Dennis Watkins	1,649	3.8	+1.0
Majority		15,248	35.3	+19.7
Turnout		43,261	72.3	−8.2
Registered electors		59,826		
Labour hold		Swing	+9.9	

General election 1992: Bridgend
Party	Candidate	Votes	%	±%
Labour	Win Griffiths	24,143	51.3	+3.8
Conservative	David Unwin	16,817	35.7	−2.3
Liberal Democrats	David Mills	4,827	10.3	−1.8
Plaid Cymru	Alun Lloyd Jones	1,301	2.8	+0.5
Majority		7,326	15.6	+6.1
Turnout		47,088	80.5	+0.2
Registered electors		58,531		
Labour hold		Swing	+3.0	

=== Elections in the 1980s ===
General election 1987: Bridgend
Party	Candidate	Votes	%	±%
Labour	Win Griffiths	21,893	47.5	+12.3
Conservative	Peter Hubbard-Miles	17,513	38.0	−0.4
SDP	Russell Smart	5,590	12.1	−11.1
Plaid Cymru	Laura McAllister	1,065	2.3	−0.9
Majority		4,380	9.5	N/A
Turnout		46,061	80.3	+3.3
Registered electors		57,389		
Labour gain from Conservative		Swing	+6.8	

General election 1983: Bridgend
Party	Candidate	Votes	%	±%
Conservative	Peter Hubbard-Miles	15,950	38.4	N/A
Labour	John A. Fellows	14,623	35.2	N/A
SDP	Russell Smart	9,630	23.2	N/A
Plaid Cymru	Keith Bush	1,312	3.2	N/A
Majority		1,327	3.2	N/A
Turnout		41,515	77.0	N/A
Registered electors		53,918		
Conservative win (new seat)				

== See also ==
- Bridgend (Senedd constituency)
- List of parliamentary constituencies in Mid Glamorgan
- List of UK Parliament constituencies in Wales
