= Nick Ward (Welsh musician) =

Welsh singer-songwriter

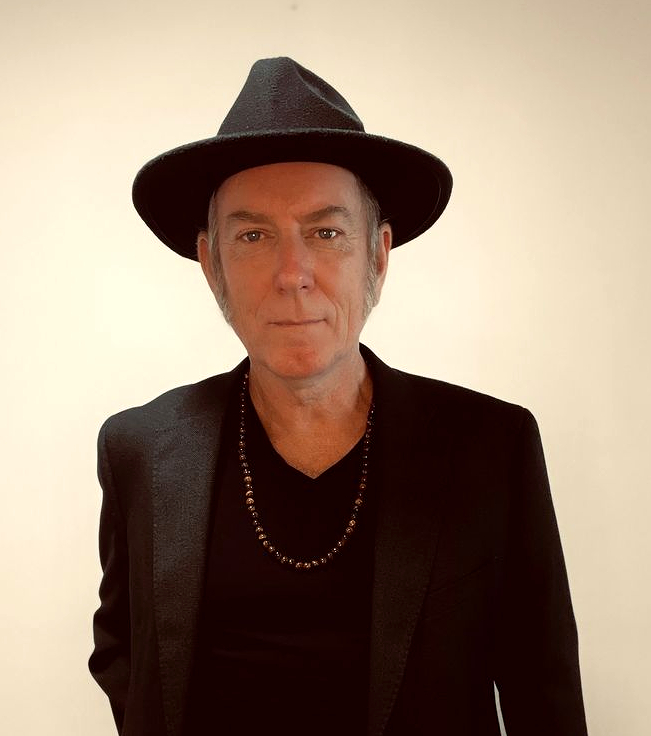
- Ward in March 2026

Background information
- Origin: Porthcawl, South Wales
- Genres: New wave, alternative, rock, country music, folk
- Instruments: Vocals, guitar, piano, harmonica
- Years active: 2009–present
- Label: AudioFile Records
- Website: nickwardmusic.com

Nick Ward is a Welsh singer-songwriter from Porthcawl, South Wales. He signed to UK label AudioFile Records in 2009 and has many releases to his name. Aside from 25 singles he has released 2 EP's and 7 albums - Outside Looking In (2009), Pink Bay (2010), Cadenza (2012), World in Reverse (2014), Phonus Balonus (2017) Jorum Of Skee (2024) Everybody Knows The Dice Are Loaded (2025)

== Career ==
Ward has his roots in new wave but isn't afraid to delve into other genres including country, indie rock, americana and folk. Since signing to AudioFile Records he has supported some big-name artists, including The Alarm, Toyah Willcox, Simon Townshend and The Christians. Ward has appeared live in session on the Tom Robinson Show on 6 Music, and played many live sets on BBC Radio Wales

== Discography ==
=== Singles ===
- "I Am War" (November 2009)
- "Can You Heal Me Now?" (June 2010)
- "Just look Around You" (August 2010)
- "All The World's A Stage" (July 2011)
- "O Angeline" (September 2011)
- "Now There Is Nothing" – with Atheen (January 2013)
- "Revelation Blues No2" (June 2013)
- "My Good Friend" (January 2014)
- "Well Imagine That" (November 2014)
- "Into The Unknown" (October 2015)
- "I Know You Know We Know" (August 2016)
- "Under A Chemical Sky" (December 2016)
- "Caroline" (January 2018)
- "Come Roll With Me" (June 2018)
- "Shadows And Dust" – with Deborah Wilson (October 2018)
- "Slipstream" (November 2018)
- "Shifting Sands" (August 2019)
- "Roll With The Punches" (April 2023)
- "Hitchin' A Ride" (October 2024)
- "Jupiter's Rising" (October 2024)
- "Saddle Up, Settle Down" (April 2025)
- "With Just A Spark" (May 2025)
- "Soar" (March 2026)
- "The Storm" (May 2026)

=== EPs ===
- Rag & Bone EP (May 2009)
- Keep It Under Your Hat (October 2020)

=== Albums ===
- Outside Looking In (May 2009)
- Pink Bay (November 2010)
- Cadenza (February 2012)
- World in Reverse (April 2014)
- Phonus Balonus (February 2017)
- Jorum Of Skee (November 2024)
- Everybody Knows The Dice Are Loaded (July 2025)
