= Ken Richards =

Wales international rugby union & league footballer

Personal information
- Full name: Kenneth Henry Llewellyn Richards
- Born: 29 January 1934 Bridgend, Wales
- Died: 8 January 1972 (aged 37) Bridgend, Wales

Playing information

Rugby union
- Position: Fly-half
Club
Years	Team	Pld	T	G	FG	P
≤1960–≤60	Bedwas RFC
≤1960–≤60	Cardiff RFC
≤1960–61	Bridgend RFC
	Total	0	0	0	0	0
Representative
Years	Team	Pld	T	G	FG	P
1960–61	Wales	5	1	0	2	9

Rugby league
Club
Years	Team	Pld	T	G	FG	P
1961–64	Salford

Kenneth Henry Llewellyn Richards (29 January 1934 – 8 January 1972) was a Welsh rugby union and professional rugby league footballer who played in the 1960s. He played representative level rugby union (RU) for Wales, and at club level for Bedwas RFC, Cardiff RFC and Bridgend RFC, as a fly-half, and club level rugby league (RL) for Salford. Noted for his drop-goals, Ken Richards would often take penalties and conversions using the drop goal method rather than placing the ball, during September 1961 he scored a drop goal penalty against Doncaster from 55 yards (50 metres).

== Background ==
Ken Richards born in Bridgend, Wales, he was a pupil at Bridgend Grammar School, and he died in Bridgend, Wales.

== International honours ==
Ken Richards won caps for Wales (RU) while at Bridgend RFC in 1960 against South Africa, and in 1961 against England, Scotland, Ireland, and France.
