= St Clare's School, Newton =

Coordinates: 51.48610°N 3.67563°W

Clare House School Porthcawl

Location
- Clare House School; Porthcawl; Newton, Bridgend County Borough, CF36 5AS; Wales

Information
- Former names: St Clare’s School and St Clare’s Convent
- Type: Private School
- Religious affiliation: Non-faith
- Established: 1938
- Trust: Clare House Independent School Trust
- Executive Head of School: Sally Davis
- Early Years Lead: Lauren Hallihan
- Key people: Rachael Harman Jayne McCarthy Neil Geraghty Monique David Gareth Baker
- Years taught: Early Years to Year 6
- Gender: Coeducational
- Age: 3 to 11
- Colour: Teal
- Website: www.clarehouseschool.org

Clare House School Porthcawl is a not-for-profit private school located in Porthcawl, Wales. Opening in 2026, the school provides education for children aged 3 to 11, covering Early Years through to Year 6. It is operated by the Clare House Independent School Trust, an organisation established to secure the continuation of independent education on the site of the former St Clare’s School.

The school was established following the closure of St Clare’s School in 2025, with the Trust acquiring a long-term lease of 106-years on the site to preserve its educational legacy. Clare House School Porthcawl opens in September 2026 with an initial intake of primary-aged pupils and plans to expand year-on-year.

Clare House School Porthcawl operates on a not-for-profit model, with all income reinvested into the school’s facilities, staffing, and educational provision. Its educational approach emphasises personalised learning, strong relationships, and community values.

The school’s founding leadership includes Executive Head of School, Sally Davis, an experienced educator in the independent sector.

== History ==
In 1938, the Rev. Canon James of Newton invited the Sisters of St Clare from Newry, County Down, Northern Ireland to open a secondary day-school for girls in their new convent at the Clevis in Newton. The school was originally titled Sacred Heart School.

Pupil numbers swelled during the war years as evacuees joined the school as boarders. Therefore, the decision was taken to form two schools – Preparatory and Senior. Both schools were renamed after St. Clare. Boys were admitted to the school, but only the Preparatory School. Boarding ceased in the early 1990s due to falling numbers. In May 2006, the Sisters of St Clare took the decision to retire and the school was sold to Cognita Schools. The name became simply St Clare's School.

In 2026, Clare House Independent School Trust acquired the site from Cognita School. This led to the formation of Clare House School Porthcawl, which is owned and governed by the Trust. Both the school and the Trust operate as a not-for-profit and were established to preserve and advance high-quality independent education in South Wales.

The Trust exists to deliver exceptional educational opportunities, protect local provision and ensure future generations can learn and thrive within their community. As a not-for-profit organisation, there are no shareholders - every decision is made in the best interests of the school, and every surplus is reinvested directly into its development.

Trustees bring a wide range of professional expertise and strategic oversight, working closely with school leadership to guide long-term direction, ensure strong governance and uphold the highest standards of safeguarding and care.

== The school ==
Clare House School Porthcawl is a co-educational, non-selective, not-for-profit independent school for children aged 3 to 11, offering provision from Early Years through to Year 6.

The school draws on the Early Years Foundation Stage and the National Curriculum for England to secure strong attainment outcomes, complemented by elements of the Curriculum for Wales. In Early Years, the approach is further inspired by the Reggio Emilia philosophy, recognising children as capable, curious and active participants in their learning.

The dominant pedagogy is experiential learning. This is supported by project-based learning and play with purpose approaches to learning. Strong emphasis is placed on how children learn, not just what they learn. Children actively explore, investigate and apply their knowledge through a bespoke, evidence-based blend of pedagogies. This recognises that learning is transdisciplinary, creating experiences that are purposeful, engaging and connected to the world around them.

The curriculum is designed to develop the whole child, balancing academic rigour with social-emotional growth, creativity and physical development. Specialist teaching, outdoor learning and meaningful experiences ensure both breadth and depth across all areas.

Three whole-school initiatives, known as our Big Ideas include wellbeing, service learning, and diversity, equity and inclusion framing opportunities to extend learning. These are embedded through daily practice and fully integrated into learning.

Together, these elements create an education that is ambitious, relevant and designed for the future.

== See also ==
- Cognita
