= Porthcawl =

Town in south Wales

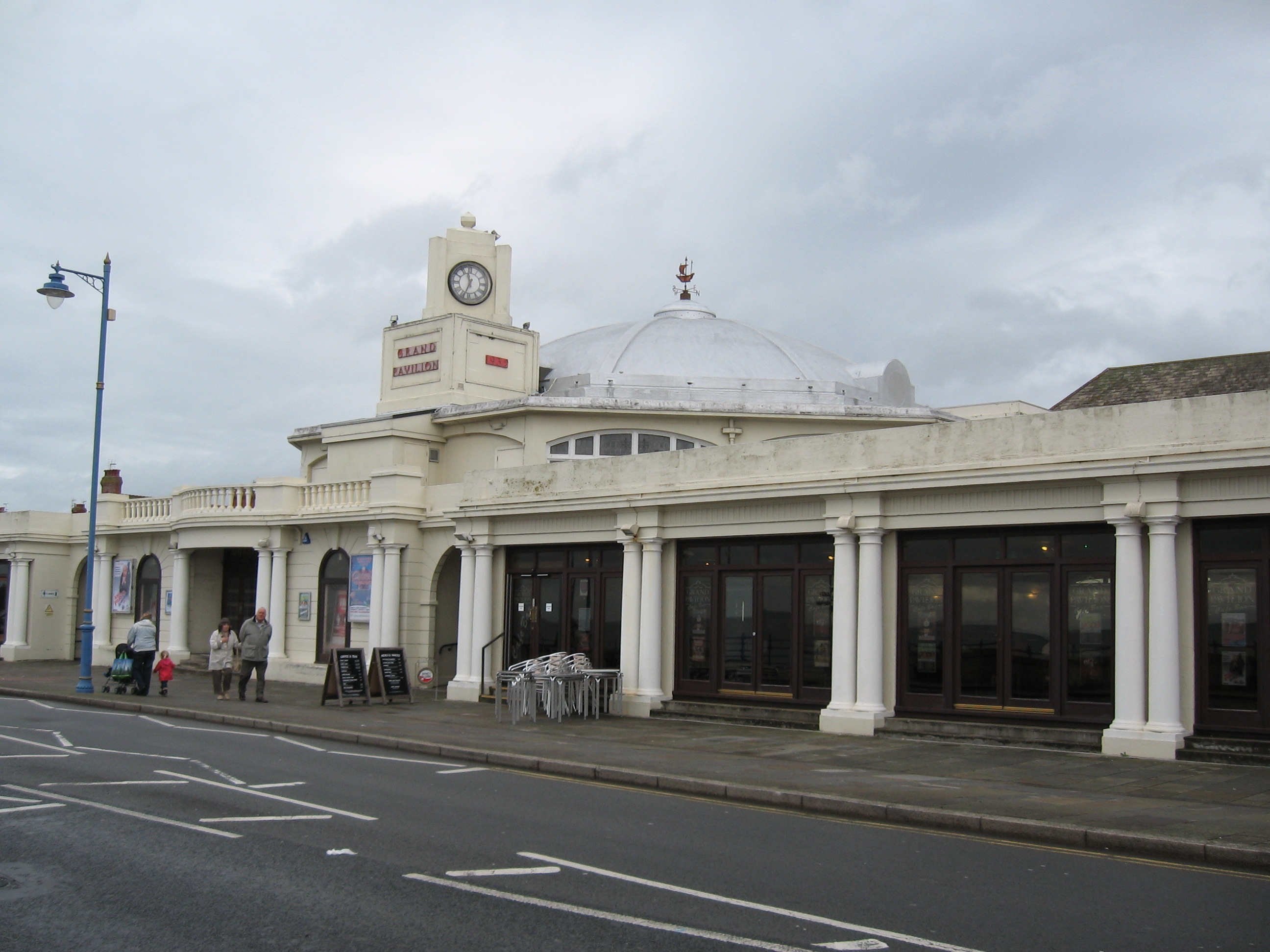
- Grand Pavilion, Porthcawl

- Location within Bridgend
- Population: 16,005 (2011)
- OS grid reference: SS825775
- Principal area: Bridgend
- Preserved county: Mid Glamorgan
- Country: Wales
- Sovereign state: United Kingdom
- Post town: PORTHCAWL
- Postcode district: CF36
- Dialling code: 01656
- Police: South Wales
- Fire: South Wales
- Ambulance: Welsh
- UK Parliament: Bridgend
- Senedd Cymru – Welsh Parliament: Pen-y-bont Bro Morgannwg
- Website: porthcawltowncouncil.gov.uk
- List of places UK Wales Bridgend 51.48°N 3.69°W Map of the community

Porthcawl ([pɔrθˈkaul]) is a town and community in the Bridgend County Borough of Wales. It is located on the south coast, 25 miles (40 km) west of Cardiff and 19 miles (31 km) south-east of Swansea.

Historically part of Glamorgan and situated on a low limestone headland on the South Wales coast, overlooking the Bristol Channel, Porthcawl developed as a coal port during the 19th century, but its trade was soon taken over by more rapidly developing ports such as Barry. North-west of the town, in the dunes known as Kenfig Burrows, lies the remains of Kenfig Castle.

== Toponymy ==
Porth is a common Welsh element meaning "harbour" and the cawl here refers to "sea kale", which may have grown in profusion or even been collected here.

== Holiday resort ==
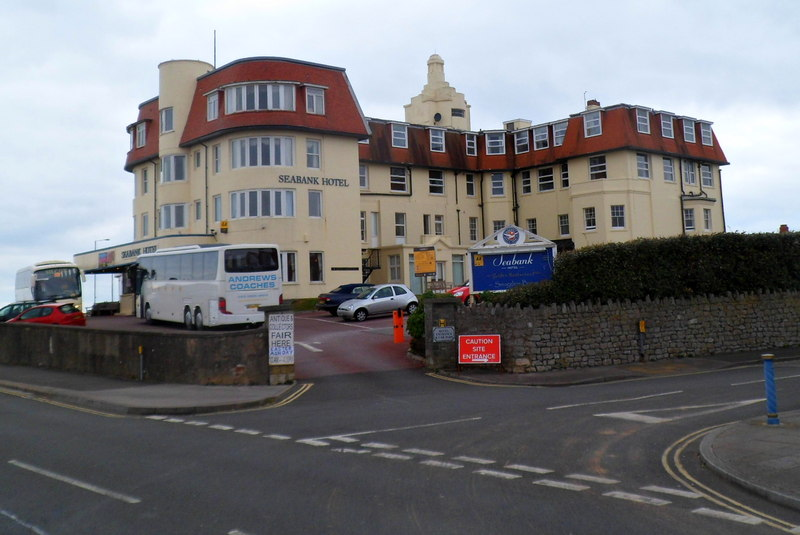
Seabank Hotel

Porthcawl is a holiday resort in South Wales and is home to a large static caravan park known as Trecco Bay, which is owned and operated by Parkdean Resorts. It has an extensive promenade and several beaches: a tourist-oriented beach at Trecco Bay, at the east end of the town; a sandy beach at Rest Bay, which lies to the north-west of the town; and the quiet and sandy Pink Bay leading out towards Sker Point where a tarmac-covered car park serves a sandy beach. Trecco Bay and Rest Bay are Blue Flag Beaches.

Porthcawl, like many British resorts, has suffered a decline in its holiday trade, especially since most of the South Wales Valleys coal pits closed. A major feature of the summer was the miners' fortnight, when large numbers of miners took their annual break.

== Local attractions ==
Tourist attractions in the area include sandy beaches, a grand pavilion, a funfair named Coney Beach (modelled on Coney Island in New York), a museum, three golf courses and the site of the former black obelisk.

=== Porthcawl promenade ===
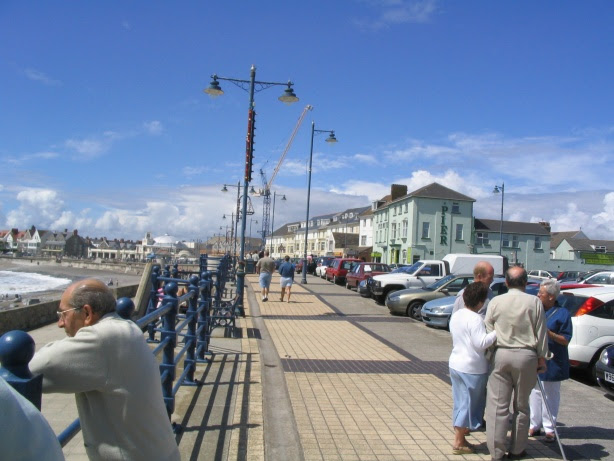
Porthcawl Promenade

Built in 1887 to commemorate Queen Victoria's Golden Jubilee, Porthcawl's promenade runs along the seafront from Lock's Common in the west to the harbour, before joining the Eastern Promenade and leading to Coney Beach and Griffin Park. It was restored in 1996. There are many cafes, bars, restaurants and hotels along the promenade, which offer views across the Bristol Channel.

The Grand Pavilion, built at a cost of £25,000 in 1932, is the venue for shows, including the annual pantomime. The singer, actor and civil rights activist Paul Robeson once performed 'live' at the Pavilion via a transatlantic telephone link.

Controversial luxury flats now dominate the seafront on the site previously occupied by the Esplanade Hotel, which dated back to the late 1880s. The Royal Society of Architects in Wales awarded 'Esplanade House' a Welsh Housing Design Award in 2006, but the architecture has proved unpopular with many local residents who have nicknamed it "the bottle bank".

=== Harbour Quarter ===
Porthcawl Lifeboat Station, built in 1995, is situated near the harbour. The station operates an Atlantic 85-class lifeboat and a D-class IB1 inflatable lifeboat. Cosy Corner is a park area, which over the years has housed a theatre, cinema, roller skating rink and ballroom. The Jennings Building, built in 1832, is a grade II listed building and Wales' oldest maritime warehouse. The building was identified as a potentially important facility as part of the Porthcawl Regeneration Strategy; it houses three hospitality businesses.

At the end of Porthcawl jetty stands a white lighthouse built in 1860, as a navigational aid. It was the last coal and gas-powered lighthouse in the United Kingdom. It switched to being powered by North Sea gas in 1974, before becoming powered by electricity in 1997. The jetty and surrounding area are popular spots for sea fishing.

The historic ships the PS Waverley, the last seagoing paddle steamer in the world, and the MV Balmoral sail from this area during the summer months.

== Governance ==
Prior to 1996, the town was divided into the Porthcawl East and Porthcawl West wards, electing a total of seven councillors to Ogwr Borough Council.

Subsequent to the creation of Bridgend County Borough Council and as a result of The County Borough of Bridgend (Electoral Arrangements) Order 1998, the town was divided into five county wards corresponding to the town council wards: Newton, Nottage, Porthcawl East Central, Porthcawl West Central and Rest Bay. These elect a total of five county councillors.

Porthcawl is represented by the following parliamentary constituencies:

- Pen-y-bont Bro Morgannwg for the Senedd
- Bridgend for the UK Parliament.

== Education ==
There are six English medium schools in Porthcawl: four primary schools, one comprehensive school and one private school.

=== Porthcawl Comprehensive School ===
Porthcawl Comprehensive School, on the western side of the town, has 1,500 pupils (aged 11–18) and 80 teaching staff. Both Ruth Jones and Rob Brydon attended this school.

As at 2011, it was the only school to have received a new Band 1 assessment in the Bridgend County from the Welsh Government.

=== Clare House School ===
St Clare's School was a co-educational independent school, located in the village of Newton (an eastern part of Porthcawl), in Bridgend County Borough. The school provides preparatory, secondary and tertiary education leading to GCSE and A-level qualifications. Originally a Roman Catholic girls' school, the school was owned and operated by the Cognita Group.

In 2026, Clare House Independent School Trust acquired the site from Cognita School. This led to the formation of Clare House School Porthcawl, which is owned and governed by the Trust.

=== Nottage Primary School ===
This is a state school which provides education for ages 3–11 and is participating in the Foundation Phase. It is a large primary school, with approximately 500 pupils, surrounded by extensive grounds. It has a conservation area and is in the process of building a pond. It has a large outdoor play area and a sensory garden. There is an outdoor classroom which is used for a range of activities.

=== West Park Primary School ===
This is a state school located in Nottage. The school was built and opened for teaching in 1971 and has since been extended to incorporate the growing needs of the surrounding area and community. The school has been awarded the Eco-schools Green Flag and the BECTA ICT excellence award.

=== Porthcawl Primary School ===
This is a mixed state school for pupils between the ages of 3 and 11 years, which includes a Foundation Phase Area admitting pupils of nursery age.

=== Newton Primary School ===
This is a mixed state school with approximately 235 pupils.

=== Closed school ===
==== St John's School ====
St John's School was a co-educational independent school, located in the village of Newton. The school provided preparatory, secondary and tertiary education leading to GCSE qualifications. The school closed at the end of July 2014.

== Musical establishments ==
The Porthcawl Male Voice Choir, or Côr Meibion Porthcawl, is a male voice choir formed in 1980 with 17 members. The choir has 45 members. Each year, the choir performs with a celebrity guest; in 2011, this was Lesley Garrett.

== Beaches ==
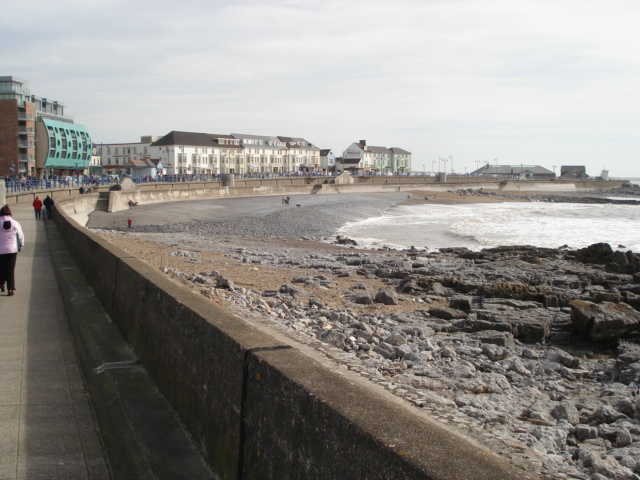

Porthcawl has seven beaches:

- Newton Beach, on the eastern edge of Porthcawl, is a long sandy and rocky beach, backed by the Newton Burrows and Merthyr Mawr sand dunes. It is a designated Site of Special Scientific Interest and ends at the mouth of the River Ogmore at Ogmore-by-Sea.
- Trecco Bay is a large, sandy and rocky Blue Flag beach. Trecco Bay holiday park is situated alongside the beach.
- Sandy Bay, with the area in front of the fairground known as Coney Beach, is a large sheltered and sandy beach.
- Seafront Beach, also known as Town Beach, is a rocky beach in the centre of Porthcawl, which was partly tarmacked over in the 1980s to repair sea defences.
- Rest Bay is a sandy Blue Flag beach situated in the west of Porthcawl.
- Pink Bay has a steep pebble bank down onto a flat beach edged by a rocky shoreline. These rocks have a unique pink marbling effect, hence the name.
- Sker Beach is the most westerly beach in Porthcawl and is accessible only by walking from Rest Bay or Kenfig National Nature Reserve. A plaque is visible at low tide, in memory of the 47 lives lost on the S.S. Samtampa, capsized and wrecked in heavy seas, and the Mumbles RNLI life boat which attempted rescue on 23 April 1947.

Five rocky points line the Porthcawl shore; from east to west, these are: Newton Point, Rhych Point, Porthcawl Point, Hutchwns Point and Sker Point.

== Scheduled monuments ==
There are three scheduled monuments in the Porthcawl Community area:

- Hutchwns round barrow (51.4849°N 3.7098°W, SS813776). This is the only partly-surviving mound of a Bronze Age round barrow. It is sited near a public park and a modern standing stone has been placed alongside it.
- Dan-y-Graig Roman villa (51.4893°N 3.6717°W, SS840780). The villa, a rare feature in Wales, dates mainly to 3rd and 4th centuries and is in Newton. The site includes agricultural buildings and was partly excavated in 1985–86.
- Nottage Court inscribed stone (51.49°N 3.7005°W, SS820781). A Roman milestone, with three Latin inscriptions and possible Ogham. Its location is in a garden at Nottage Court; it was moved there in the 19th century, from SS763890, now Port Talbot Docks.

== Newton village ==
Newton dates from the 12th century. St. John's Church, founded by the Knights of the Order of St. John of Jerusalem 800 years ago and originally built as a fortress, overlooks the village green.

The Jolly Sailor pub, the oldest in Porthcawl, and the Ancient Briton pub also overlooks the green.

To the south of the church lies St John's Well, the water from which is reputed to have healing properties.

Newton village homed St John's School, an independent day school established in 1921, which closed in c2016. It is also home to St Clare's School, which is also an independent day school and was established in 1938 by the Poor Clares order of nuns.

== Festivals ==
The following festivals operate in the town:

- Porthcawl Town Carnival takes place annually in July. A procession of themed floats and acts make their way around the town, collecting money for charity and competing for the prize of the best float. The procession makes its way to the carnival field where there are stalls, a fun fair and live acts.
- The Porthcawl Jazz and Blues Festival is held annually in April hosting musical performances, workshops and family events over a weekend.
- Surf Cult runs for a week in September. Events include surf contests, music, art, fashion and film, with an outdoor market. The festival ends with the Surfers' Ball.
- The Elvis Festival runs every September, attracting Elvis Presley tribute artists and devotees from across the world. It is recognised as the biggest gathering of Elvis fans in Europe and maybe in the world. The Elvis Festival was selected as one of the UK's top twenty summer festivals by The Times in 2008.

== Sport ==
Porthcawl is one of the top locations in Wales for surfing, with both national and regional competitions held at Rest Bay.

Other alternative sports, such as skateboarding and rollerblading, are also popular with the former PADS skate park by the Harbour and the new bowl park off Heol Y Goedwig.

There are three golf courses to the north of the town including Royal Porthcawl Golf Club, which attracts players from around the world.

Porthcawl is home also home to football side Porthcawl Town Athletic F.C., which boasts 1st, reserve and 3rd teams, as well as numerous junior teams.

Rugby Union also has a rich heritage in the area with Porthcawl RFC.

The town has lifeguard clubs that train the lifeguards that guard Coney Beach and Trecco Bay, as well as Rest Bay and Sker beaches.

Porthcawl hosts a free weekly Parkrun at 9am each Saturday. It starts on the Lower Promenade in front of the Grand Pavilion, heads out to Rest Bay and finishes near to the pier.

The famous world championship boxing match between WBC world featherweight champion Howard Winstone and his challenger, Jose Legra, which Legra won by fifth-round technical knockout, was held in Porthcawl on 24 July 1968.

== Regeneration ==
Porthcawl waterfront is proposed for substantial regeneration as part of the 7 Bays Project. The Planning Guidance outlines proposals that will result in the comprehensive regeneration of Porthcawl's waterfront, stretching from Cosy Corner and the harbour in the south, to Trecco Bay in the east. The plan includes the construction of new sea defences, enabling regeneration of the area to take place, and also protecting more than 440 existing properties from flood risk.

The first phase of Porthcawl's regeneration, Porthcawl Harbourside, was launched on 28 March 2008. A 17-acre (69,000 m^{2}) site has been marketed to developers for a substantial mixed use scheme. The scheme is envisaged to include a new foodstore, extra retail space, leisure and community facilities, up to 450 houses/flats, a new promenade, town square and car parking.

== Transport ==
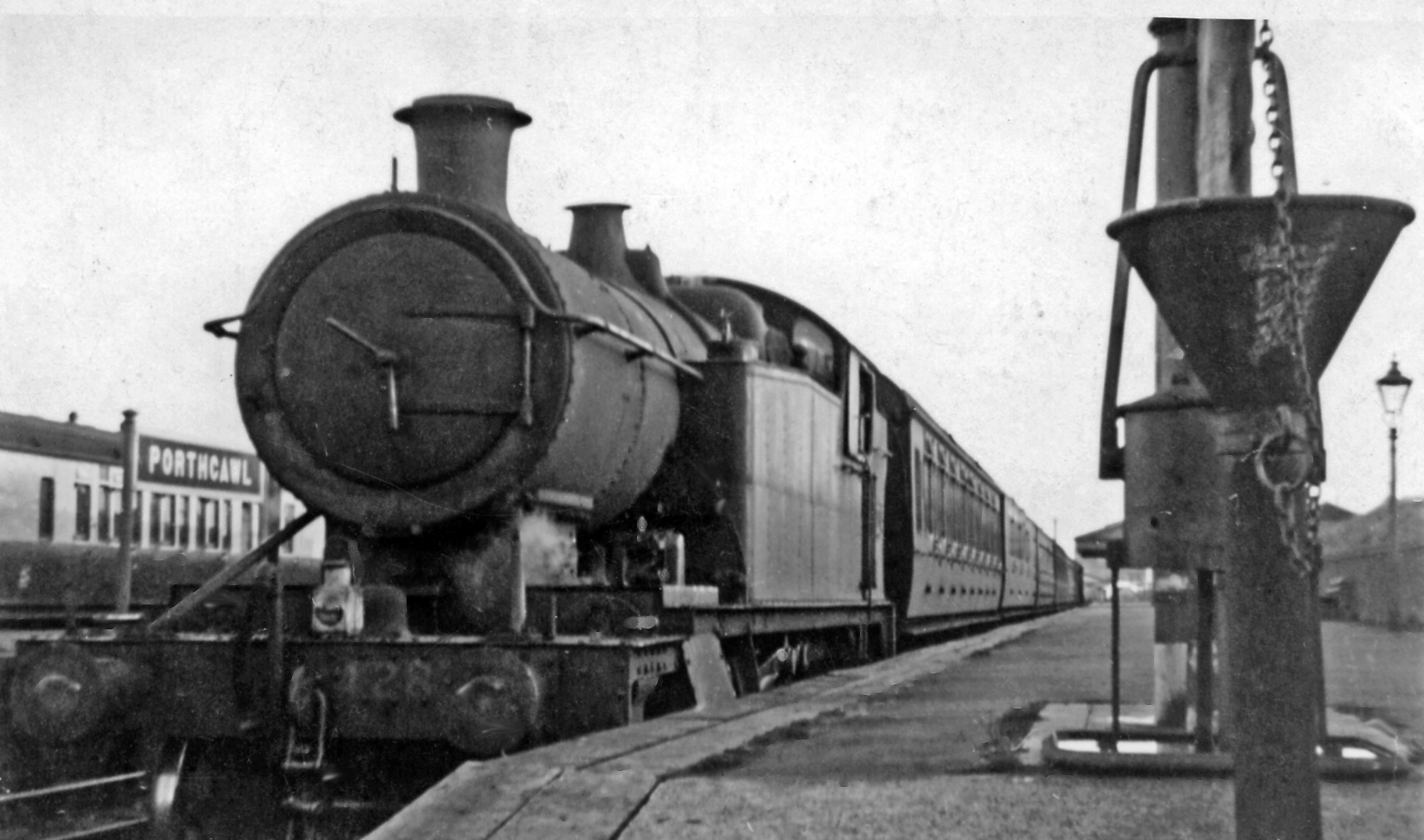
The former Porthcawl station in 1946

The nearest railway station to Porthcawl is Pyle. Transport for Wales operates services to Cardiff Central, Swansea, Carmarthen and Manchester Piccadilly. Porthcawl railway station once served the town, sited at the top of Station Hill, but was closed in 1963.

First Cymru and Stagecoach South Wales operate local bus routes, which include:

- X2 to Cardiff Central via Bridgend, Cowbridge and West Cardiff
- 172 to Aberdare, via Bridgend (Sundays only)
- 63 to Bridgend, via Pyle.

The A4229 road links the town to junction 37 of the M4 motorway.

The nearest airport is Cardiff Airport, 23 miles (37 km) away, which offers scheduled domestic and international flights.

== Notable people ==
See Category:People from Porthcawl

- Jan Anderson
- Rob Brydon
- Cliff Davies
- Mary De la Beche Nicholl
- Robert East
- Anthony G. Evans
- Matthew Gravelle
- Brian Huggett
- Jason Hughes
- Dafydd Jenkins
- Harry Jones
- Ruth Jones
- Jack Lewis
- Stephen Maybery
- Helen Morgan
- Tom Prydie
- Simon Richardson
- Tony Rowley
- Nick Ward
- Robert Wilfort
- Clive Williams

== Air crash ==
On 11 February 2009, two RAF Grob Tutor training aircraft collided over the area, with one landing in Kenfig and the other landing in Margam. Two instructors and two teenage air cadets died in the incident.
