= List of MPs for constituencies in Wales (1945–1950) =

This is a list of members of Parliament (MPs) elected to the House of Commons of the United Kingdom by Welsh constituencies for the Thirty Eighth Parliament of the United Kingdom (1945–1950).

Most MPs elected for Welsh constituencies at the 1945 United Kingdom general election, held on 5 July 1945, served a full term, but there were four by-elections.

The list is sorted by the name of the MP.

== Composition ==
Affiliation	Members
Labour Party	25
Liberal Party	7
Conservative Party	3
National Liberal	1
Total	36

== MPs ==
MP	Constituency	Party	In constituency since
Aneurin Bevan	Ebbw Vale	Labour Party	1929
Nigel Birch	Flintshire	Conservative Party	1945
Roderic Bowen	Cardiganshire	Liberal Party	1945
Hilary Marquand	Cardiff East	Labour Party	1945
James Callaghan	Cardiff South	Labour Party	1945
William Cove	Abervaon	Labour Party	1929
George Daggar	Abertillery	Labour Party	1929
Clement Davies	Montgomeryshire	Liberal Party	1929
S. O. Davies	Merthyr Tydfil	Labour Party	1934 by-election
Charles Edwards	Bedwellty	Labour Party	1918
Ness Edwards	Caerphilly	Labour Party	1939 by-election
Peter Freeman	Newport	Labour Party	1945
David Grenfell	Gower	Labour Party	1922
Jim Griffiths	Llanelli	Labour Party	1936 by-election
George Hall	Aberdare	Labour Party	1922
Arthur Jenkins	Pontypool	Labour Party	1935
William John	Rhondda West	Labour Party	1920 by-election
Gwilym Lloyd George	Pembrokeshire	Liberal Party	1929
Megan Lloyd George	Anglesey	Liberal Party	1929
William Mainwaring	Rhondda East	Labour Party	1933 by-election
Percy Morris	Swansea West	Labour Party	1945
Rhys Hopkin Morris	Carmarthen	Liberal Party	1945
Henry Morris-Jones	Denbigh	National Liberal	1929
David Mort	Swansea East	Labour Party	1940 by-election
Ted Williams	Ogmore	Labour Party	1931 by-election
Arthur Pearson	Pontypridd	Labour Party	1938 by-election
David Price-White	Caernarvon Boroughs	Conservative Party	1945
Leslie Pym	Monmouth	Conservative Party	1939 by-election
Robert Richards	Wrexham	Labour Party	1935
Emrys Roberts	Merioneth	Liberal Party	1945
Goronwy Roberts	Caernarvonshire	Labour Party	1945
George Thomas	Cardiff Central	Labour Party	1945
Lynn Ungoed-Thomas	Llandaff and Barry	Labour Party	1945
Tudor Watkins	Brecon and Radnor	Labour Party	1945
D. J. Williams	Neath	Labour Party	1945 by-election
William John Gruffydd	University of Wales	Liberal Party	1945

== By-elections ==
There was one by-election during this period:

- 1945 Monmouth by-election won by Peter Thorneycroft (Con)
- 1946 Ogmore by-election won by John Evans (Lab)
- 1946 Pontypool by-election won by Granville West (Lab)
- 1946 Aberdare by-election won by David Thomas (Lab)

== See also ==
- 1945 United Kingdom general election
- 1945 United Kingdom general election in Wales
