= Ogmore by-election =

Ogmore by-election may refer to one of four parliamentary by-elections held for the British House of Commons constituency of Ogmore, in South Wales:

- 1931 Ogmore by-election
- 1946 Ogmore by-election
- 2002 Ogmore by-election
- 2016 Ogmore by-election

See also

- Ogmore constituency
- List of United Kingdom by-elections
- United Kingdom by-election records
