= Union of Shop, Distributive and Allied Workers v Tesco Stores Ltd =

Usdaw v Tesco Ltd
- Court: UK Supreme Court
- Citation: [2022] EWCA Civ 978

Keywords
- Fire and rehire

Union of Shop, Distributive and Allied Workers v Tesco Stores Ltd [2024] UKSC is a UK labour law case on whether an employer can fire its staff and then rehire them on worse terms, without consent or making statutory redundancy payments. This is known as "fire and rehire".

== Facts ==
Usdaw brought a claim against Tesco after it reneged on a promise that “Retained Pay is guaranteed for life” to a number of its staff.

== Judgment ==
The Court of Appeal held that Tesco could ignore its promise and pay its workers less. Usdaw appealed to the Supreme Court, and the case was heard on 23 and 24 April 2024.

== See also ==
- UK labour law
