= Ray Powell (British politician) =

British politician (1928–2001)

Sir Ray Powell
- Powell giving the result of the Maastricht bill in 1993

Member of Parliament for Ogmore
- In office 3 May 1979 – 7 December 2001
- Preceded by: Walter Padley
- Succeeded by: Huw Irranca-Davies

Personal details
- Born: 19 June 1928 Treorchy, Mid Glamorgan, Wales
- Died: 7 December 2001 (aged 73) London, England
- Party: Labour
- Spouse: Marion Evans (m. 1950)
- Children: Janice Gregory
- Education: London School of Economics

Sir Raymond Powell (19 June 1928 – 7 December 2001) was a Welsh politician who served as the Labour Member of Parliament for Ogmore. He continued as constituency MP until his death.

== Background ==
Powell was born at Treorchy, Mid Glamorgan, in 1928. He was educated at Pentre Grammar School, the National Council of Labour Colleges, and the London School of Economics

== Career ==
A former shop worker and manager, he was sponsored by his trade union, USDAW, and entered Parliament at the 1979 election, after becoming chairman of the Welsh Labour Party in 1977; he was an opponent of Welsh devolution. He was an opposition whip from 1983 to 1995, when he retired to the backbenches. He was knighted in 1996. He was opposed to Sunday trading and was active in Parliament to block legislation to allow it.

== Personal life and death ==
Powell married Marion Evans in 1950, and their daughter, Janice Gregory, was a member of the National Assembly for Wales from 1999 to 2016.

Powell died from an apparent asthma attack at his home in London on 7 December 2001, at the age of 73.

Parliament of the United Kingdom
Preceded by Walter Padley	Member of Parliament for Ogmore; 1979–2001	Succeeded by Huw Irranca-Davies
