= Janice Gregory =

Welsh politician (born 1955)

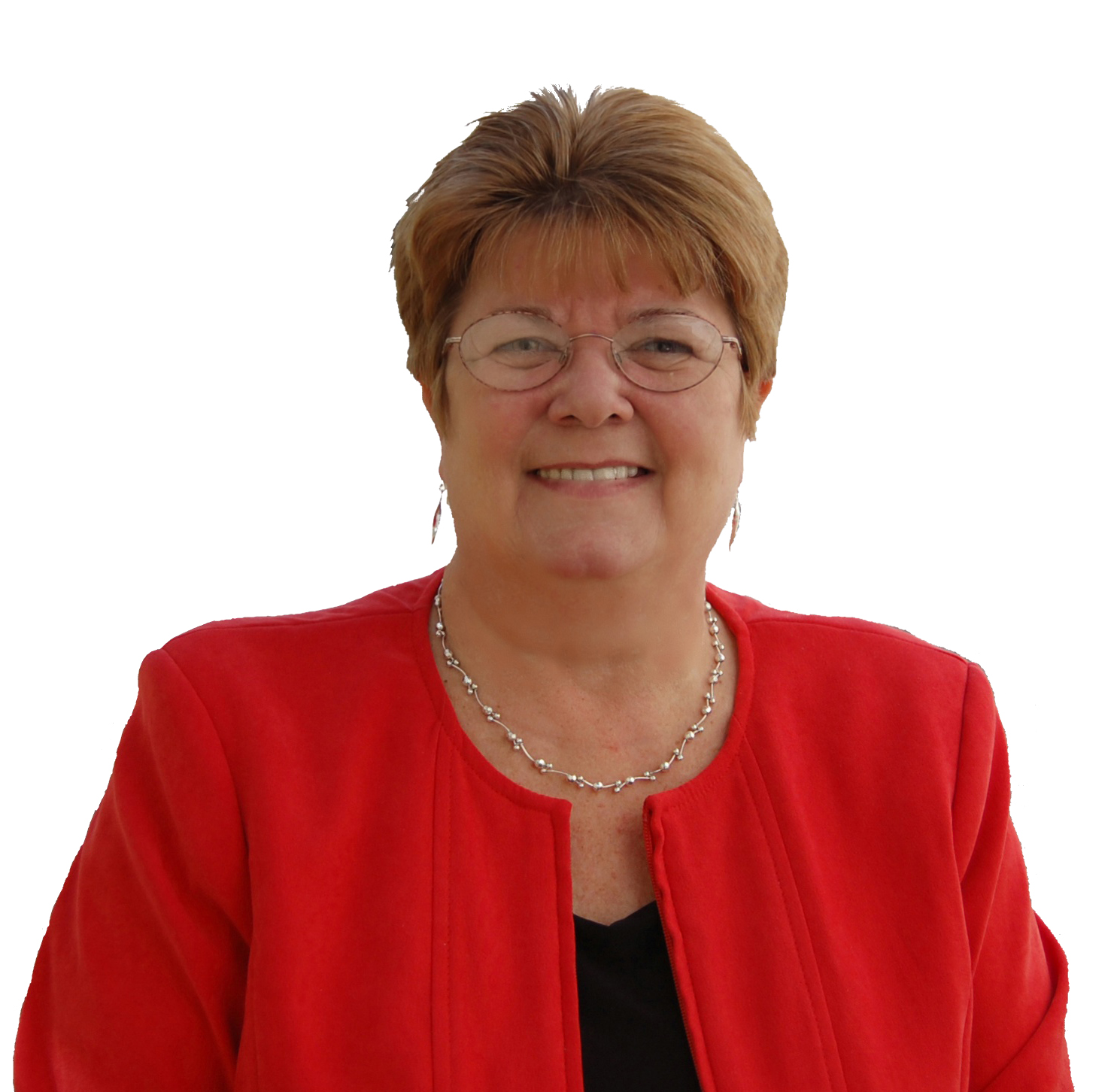

Member of the Welsh Assembly for Ogmore
- In office 6 May 1999 – 6 April 2016
- Preceded by: New Assembly
- Succeeded by: Huw Irranca-Davies
- Majority: 9,576 (47.3%)

Personal details
- Born: 10 January 1955 (age 71) Treorchy, Wales
- Party: Welsh Labour
- Spouse: Mike Gregory
- Relations: Sir Raymond Powell MP (father)
- Occupation: Political Secretary (for Sir Raymond Powell)
- Website: Welsh Labour

Janice Gregory (née Powell; born 10 January 1955) is a Welsh Labour politician, who represented the constituency of Ogmore from the time the National Assembly for Wales was established in 1999 to the election of 2016. Her main contribution to the Assembly has been through chairing the Social Justice and Regeneration Committee.

== Background ==
Gregory was born in Treorchy, the daughter of Raymond Powell, who was Labour Party Member of Parliament for Ogmore from 1979. She was educated at Bridgend Grammar School for Girls and worked as Constituency Secretary to her father from 1991, while also being active in the local Constituency Labour Party in which she was Women's Officer and Chair of the Ogmore Women's Forum. Several other members of the family were also active in Labour politics.

== Political career ==
In 1999 Gregory was selected as Labour candidate for the Ogmore constituency, the same constituency as her father, for the 1999 Welsh assembly election. She easily picked up the seat and was appointed as a Labour group whip in the Assembly. Together with three other whips, Gregory resigned this position in February 2000 after Alun Michael resigned as First Minister. It was speculated that the three, being loyal to Michael, believed there was a plot against him, and were unwilling to work for Chief Whip Andrew Davies, who they felt was behind this plot. Shortly after she announced her support for Rhodri Morgan to replace Alun Michael.

Gregory rebelled against the Labour administration in June 2000 when she voted in favour of a building a landmark headquarters building for the Assembly. She called on former cabinet minister Ron Davies to resign when it was revealed he had applied for jobs outside politics without informing the Labour leadership.

When her father suddenly died in December 2001, Gregory immediately declined to seek selection to follow him. It was uncertain whether Gregory would be reselected herself, but she managed to survive and was re-elected in the 2003 election with a 6,504 majority.

In December 2005, she was cleared of breaches of the Assembly Code of Conduct, after alleging that a GP in her constituency using an 0870 national rate number was doing so to make "a fast buck". However, she was deemed to have failed to conduct herself in a proper manner.

After her re-election she was made Chair of the Social Justice and Regeneration Committee. She was described by the Western Mail as a "well below par performer by our reckoning" and given a rating of 4 marks out of ten in its assessment of the Assembly Members at the end of the 2003–07 term. However, she increased her majority in the 2007 election.

In December 2009, she was appointed to the role of Chief Whip by Carwyn Jones. She was re-elected at the 2011 Welsh Assembly election with a further increased majority.

She announced her intent to stand down at the 2016 Welsh Assembly election in 2015. Huw Irranca-Davies was selected to replace her as the Labour candidate for Ogmore. She in turn took his previous role as Labour's campaign co-ordinator for the 2016 Assembly election.

== Offices held ==
Senedd
New office	Assembly Member for Ogmore; 1999 – 2016	Succeeded by Huw Irranca-Davies
Preceded by Carl Sargeant	Chief Whip; 2009–2016	Succeeded by Jane Hutt
