= 1945 United Kingdom general election in Wales =

- 5 July 1945

All 36 Welsh seats to the House of Commons
- Turnout: 75.7% (▼0.7 pp)
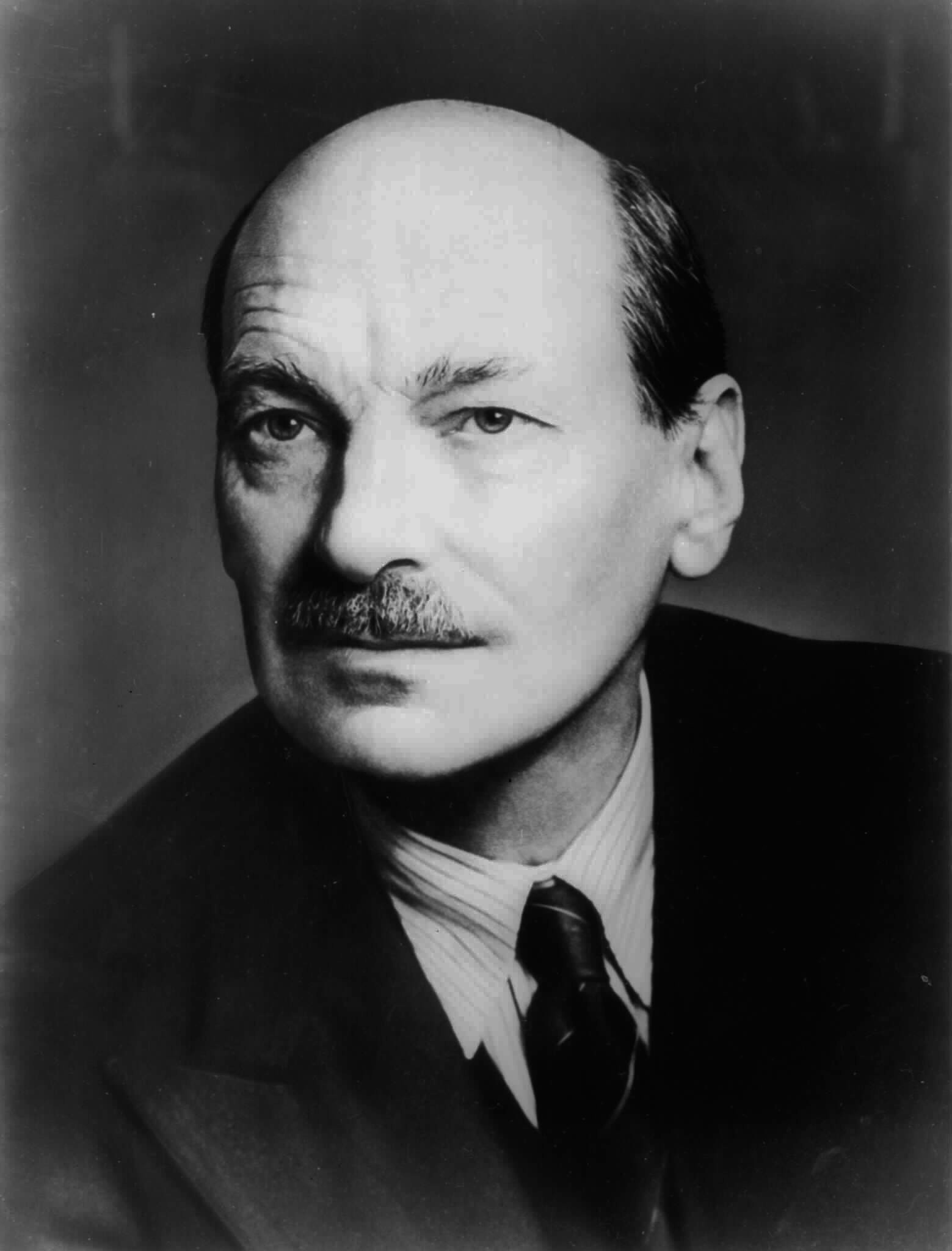

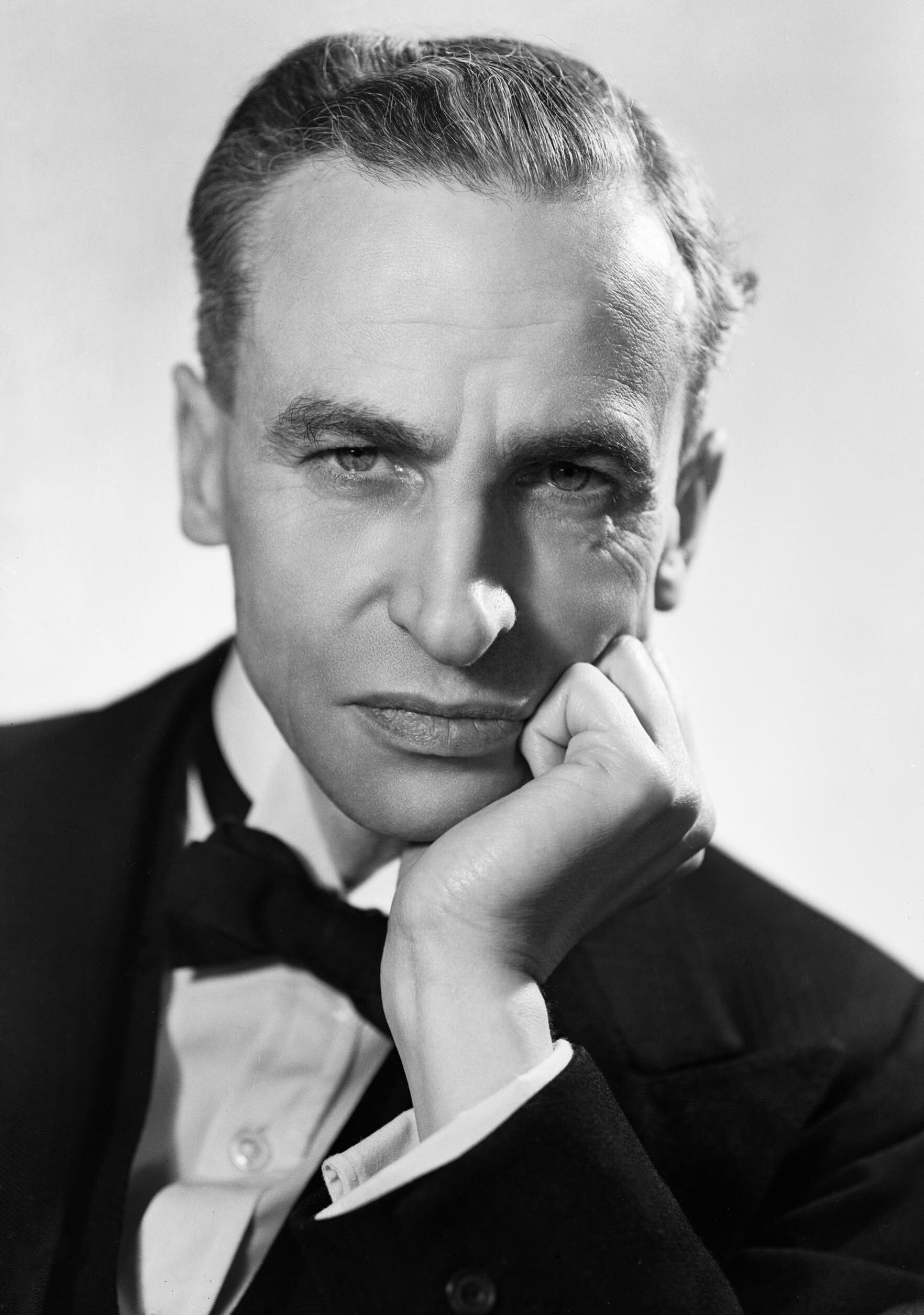

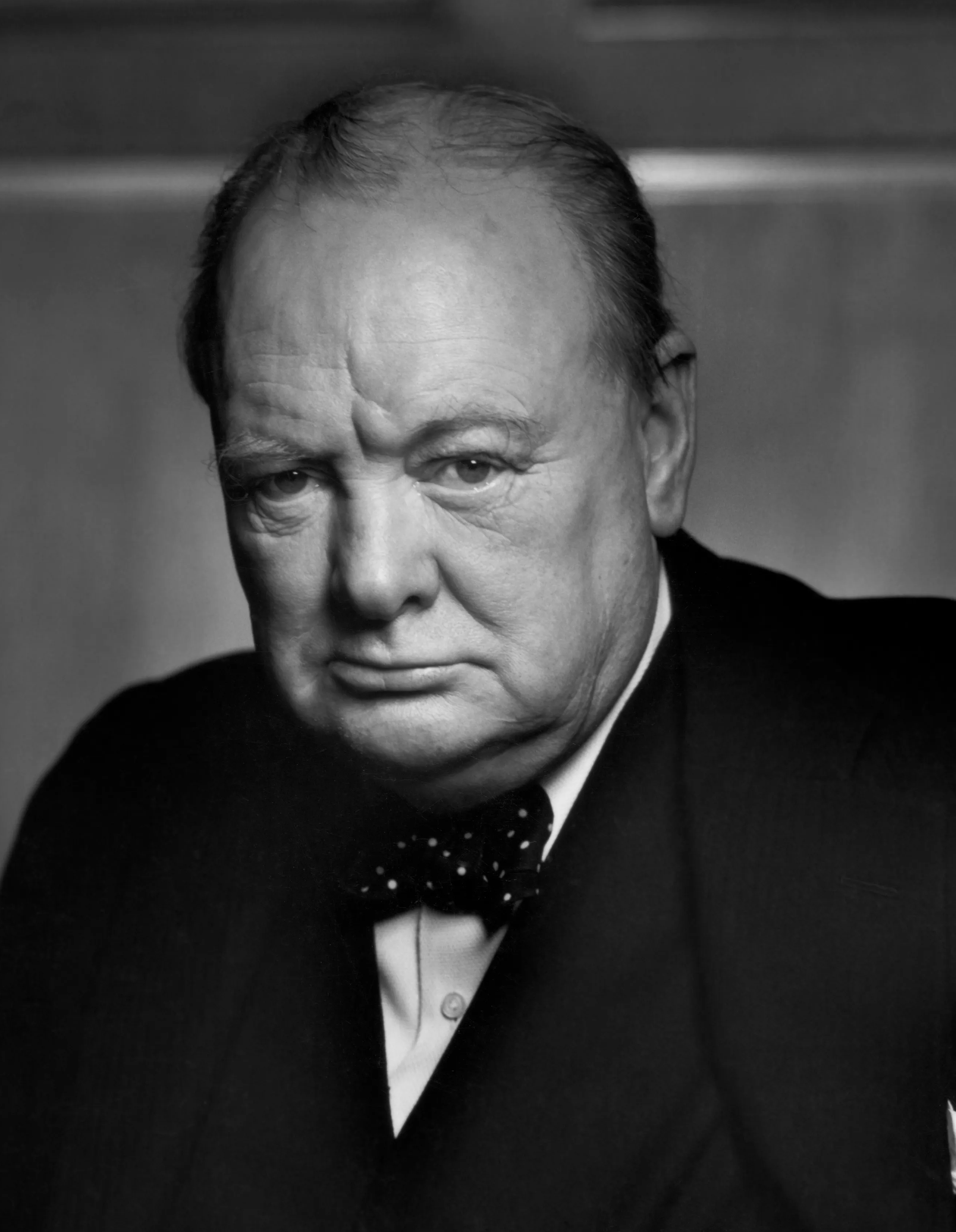

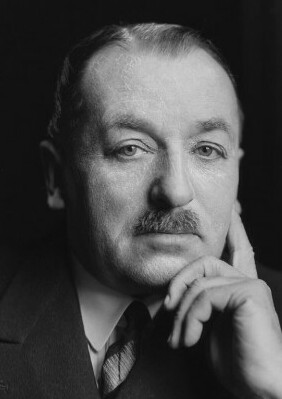
	First party	Second party
Leader	Clement Attlee	Archibald Sinclair
Party	Labour	Liberal
Leader since	25 October 1935	26 November 1935
Leader's seat	Limehouse	Caithness and Sutherland (lost seat)
Last election	18 seats, (Note: Combined results for county, borough and university seats.) 45.4%	7 seats, 18.0%
Seats won	25	7
Seat change	▲7	Steady
Popular vote	779,184 (Note: Total and percentage votes given here are for territorial constituencies only.)	198,553
Percentage	58.5%	14.9%
Swing	▲13.1 pp	▼3.1 pp
	Third party	Fourth party
Leader	Winston Churchill	Ernest Brown
Party	Conservative	Liberal National
Alliance	Churchill Caretaker Ministry	Churchill Caretaker Ministry
Leader since	9 October 1940	1940
Leader's seat	Woodford	Leith (lost seat)
Last election	6 seats, 23.4%	3 Seats, 4.1%
Seats won	3	1
Seat change	▼3	▼2
Popular vote	241,380	64,043
Percentage	18.1%	4.8%
Swing	▼5.3 pp	▲0.7 pp

On Thursday 5 July 1945, the 1945 United Kingdom general election was held in Wales, to elect all 640 members of the House of Commons, with 36 constituencies being in Wales. 35 seats represented territorial constituencies contested under the first past the post electoral system, and one additional seat represented the University of Wales which was also contested under the first past the post electoral system.

This was the final election in which the University of Wales had a seat to the House of Commons, due to it being abolished for the 1950 general election by the Representation of the People Act 1948.

Held less than two months following VE Day, this was the first general election since 1935, as general elections had been suspended by Parliament during the Second World War. Clement Attlee, the leader of the Labour Party, refused Winston Churchill's offer of continuing the wartime coalition until the Allied defeat of Japan. On 15 June, King George VI dissolved Parliament, which had been sitting for nearly ten years without an election. Counting for the election was not completed until 26 July (three weeks after polling day) to enable those stationed overseas to vote.

As it was the first general election held since the conclusion of the Second World War and nearly 10 years since the 1935 general election, it was the first of three elections during the reign of King George VI.

== Candidates ==
Below is a table summarising the candidates of the 1945 general election in Wales, excluding those in the University of Wales constituency.

Affiliation	Candidates
Labour Party	34
Conservative and Unionist Party	21
Liberal Party	17
Plaid Cymru	6
Liberal National Party	5
National	1 (Note: Secretary of State for War James Grigg stood in Cardiff East.)
Communist Party of Great Britain	1 (Note: Harry Pollitt, the General Secretary of the Communist Party of Great Britain, contested the seat of Rhondda East for the second time. Pollitt polled second in the seat within 1,000 votes of the Labour Party incumbent William Mainwaring.)
Independent Labour	1 (Note: Candidate Samuel Jennings stood in Merthyr.)
Independent	1 (Note: Candidate John Rathbone Hayes-Jones stood in Wrexham.)
Total	87

== Analysis ==
The election saw the Labour party win the most votes and seats in Wales, increasing its seat count to 25. Much like the rest of the United Kingdom, Labour gained seats primarily from the Conservative Party. In Wales, the Labour Party won Newport, Llandaff and Barry, Cardiff East and Cardiff South from the Conservatives.

The party also won Swansea West from the Liberal National Party and Cardiff Central from the National Labour. National Labour had been dissolved in June 1945 and therefore did not contest the seat, with the incumbent Member of Parliament Ernest Bennett retiring from Parliament. Finally, Labour retained Brecon and Radnorshire which it had initially won in the 1939 Brecon and Radnorshire by-election from the National Member of Parliament Ivor Guest. Guest had resigned the seat in 1939 following his succession of a viscountcy title and corresponding life peerage in the House of Lords. The Labour retention in Brecon and Radnorshire represented gain compared to previous election.

For the Liberal Party in Wales during the election, the overall seat total for the Liberal Party was unchanged overall. The Independent Liberals had rejoined the Liberal Party in 1935, after the previous election. Labour won Caernarvonshire from the reunited Liberal Party. The seat had been held by Goronwy Owen, who was one of the Liberal Independents that had rejoined the Liberal Party in 1935. The Liberals also lost Caernarvon Boroughs to the Conservative Party. Notably, David Lloyd George retired from Carnarvon Boroughs before the election, taking up a peerage in the House of Lords; however, he subsequently died in March 1945. This caused the 1945 Caernarvon Boroughs by-election with the Liberals retaining it against Plaid Cymru initially, however the seat was ultimately taken by the Conservative Party in this election. It was the first time the Conservative Party had won the seat since losing it in the 1890 Caernarvon Boroughs by-election, when Lloyd George had won the seat; however, the Conservatives would lose the seat again to Labour in 1950.

Conversely, the Liberal party won Carmarthen from the Labour Party, which was the seat loss for Labour in Wales and one of only three seat losses across the United Kingdom in the election. The other two losses occurred in England in Hammersmith North and Mile End. In addition, Liberal National Party member Clement Davies returned to the Liberal Party, and won his Montgomeryshire for the Liberals, representing a gain from the Liberal Nationals. Davies would go on become Leader of the Liberal Party a month after the general election, following the defeat of leader Archibald Sinclair in his seat in Scotland at this election. The Liberal party also again retained its seat in the University of Wales constituency.

Notable figures who entered Parliament in this election in Welsh constituencies include future Leader of the Labour Party and Prime Minister James Callaghan.

== County and borough constituency results ==
Below is a table summarising the constituency results of the 1945 general election in Wales, excluding the result in the University of Wales constituency. The seat count and vote share comparisons for the Churchill Caretaker Ministry coalition are compared with the National Government coalition which had effectively dissolved in 1940.

Party	Seats					Aggregate votes		
Party	Total	Gains	Losses	Net	Of total (%)	Total	Of total (%)	Change (%)
Labour	25	8	1	▲7	71.4	779,184	58.5	▲13.1
Churchill Caretaker Ministry (Total)	4	1	8	▼7	11.4	316,729	23.8	▼9.8
Conservative	3	1 (Note: David Price-White in Caernarvon Boroughs.)	4	▼3	8.6	241,380	18.1	▼5.3
Liberal National	1	0	2	▼2	2.9	64,043	4.8	▲0.7
National	0	0	1 (Note: Ivor Guest in Brecon and Radnorshire.)	▼1	—	11,306	0.9	▼3.2
National Labour	0	Dissolved		▼1	—	0	0.0	▼1.9
Liberal	6	2	2	Steady	17.2	198,553	14.9	▼3.1
Communist	0	0	0	Steady	—	15,761	1.2	▼0.4
Plaid Cymru	0	0	0	Steady	—	14,321	1.1	▲0.8
Independent Labour	0	Did not stand in 1935			—	5,693	0.4	—N/a
Independent	0	Did not stand in 1935			—	430	0.0	—N/a
Total	35			0	100.0	1,330,671	100.0	0.0
Registered voters, and turnout						1,758,547 (Note: Electorate in contested constituencies. The total electorate was 1,798,199.)	75.7	▼0.7

=== Popular vote ===
Popular vote
Labour	58.5%
Conservative	18.1%
Liberal	14.9%
Liberal National	4.8%
National	0.8%
Plaid Cymru	1.1%
Other	1.7%

Popular vote (coalitions)
Labour	58.5%
Caretaker Gov.	23.8%
Liberal	14.9%
Plaid Cymru	1.1%
Others	1.7%

=== Parliament seats ===
Parliament seats
Labour	71.4%
Liberal	17.2%
Conservative	8.6%
Liberal National	2.9%

Parliament seats (coalitions)
Labour	71.4%
Liberal	17.2%
Caretaker Gov.	11.4%

== University of Wales result ==
Below is a table summarising the 1945 constituency results for seat of the University of Wales constituency. The Liberal Party retained from the previous election and 1943 University of Wales by-election, bringing the total Liberal Party seats to seven out of the possible 36.

General election 1945: University of Wales
Party	Candidate	Votes	%	±%
Liberal	William John Gruffydd	5,239	75.5	+14.2
Plaid Cymru	Gwenan Jones	1,696	24.5	+2.0
Majority		3,543	51.0	+27.4
Turnout		6,935	58.5	−3.8
Liberal hold		Swing		

== See also ==
- 1945 United Kingdom general election in England
- 1945 United Kingdom general election in Scotland
- 1945 United Kingdom general election in Northern Ireland
- List of MPs for constituencies in Wales (1945–1950)
