= Trefor Richard Morgan =

Welsh nationalist activist (1914–1970)

Trefor Richard Morgan (28 January 1914 – 3 January 1970) was a Welsh nationalist activist. He was a businessman who set up an insurance company and also supported efforts around Welsh language schooling.

== Early life ==
Born in Tonyrefail, Glamorgan, Morgan lost his father in the Spanish Influenza epidemic of 1918. He won a place at grammar school, but left at age fourteen to work as a coal miner, because of his family's financial difficulties. By the mid-1940s, he was instead working in farming.

Morgan was a conscientious objector during World War II, on the ground of his Welsh nationalist beliefs. In 1941 Morgan and another man, Ted Merriman, were imprisoned for a month on the charge of insulting behaviour after they turned their backs during the playing of God Save the King at an event held in Aberystwyth. Morgan married Gwyneth Evans in 1943.

== Political activity ==
Morgan became active in Plaid Cymru. He stood for the party in Ogmore at the 1945 general election and in a 1946 by-election. He was one of the founders of the Welsh Republican Movement, set up in September 1949, after a difference of opinion led to around fifty Plaid Cymru members walking out of a conference. In 1950, he stood as an independent nationalist candidate in Merthyr Tydfil. In 1955, he again stood for Plaid, this time in Abertillery, and at the 1964 and 1966 general elections, he stood in Brecon and Radnorshire.

== Business and education ==
Morgan's election campaigns were unsuccessful, and he decided to focus on promoting independent Welsh businesses. To this end, he set up an insurance company, Cwmni Undeb, based in Aberdare. He pledged that any profits would be invested in Welsh industry or establishing Welsh-language schools. Following on from this, he created a trading estate for like-minded businesses in Hirwaun, and in 1963 founded Cronfa Glyndwr yr Ysgolion Cymreig (The Glyndŵr Trust for Welsh Schools), which distributed funds to parents wishing to send their children to Welsh-language schools. In 1968, he founded Ysgol Glyndwr near Bridgend as a residential Welsh-language secondary school, but this closed soon after his death, in 1970.
