= Bill Connor (trade unionist) =

British politician (born 1941)

Sir William Joseph Connor (born 21 May 1941) is a former British trade unionist, Labour politician and General Secretary of USDAW

Connor was a former leader of the Labour group on West Lancashire Council. In 1997, he was elected General Secretary of USDAW, a position he retained until he retired in 2004.

He received a knighthood in the 2003 New Year Honours

Trade union offices
Preceded by John Flood	Deputy General Secretary of the Union of Shop, Distributive and Allied Workers; 1989–1997	Succeeded by John Hannett
Preceded by Garfield Davies	General Secretary of the Union of Shop, Distributive and Allied Workers; 1997–2004	Succeeded by John Hannett
