= Walter Padley =

British politician (1916–1984)

Walter Ernest Padey

Member of Parliament for Ogmore
- In office 23 February 1950 – 3 May 1979
- Preceded by: John Evans
- Succeeded by: Ray Powell

Personal details
- Born: 24 July 1916
- Died: 15 April 1984 (aged 67)

Walter Ernest Padley (24 July 1916 – 15 April 1984) was a British Labour Member of Parliament for Ogmore. He was also President of the Union of Shop, Distributive and Allied Workers from 1948 to 1964.

== Early life ==
Walter Ernest Padley was born on 24 July 1916, the son of Ernest and Mildred Padley. In 1933, whilst still a teenager, he became active in a distributive workers' trade union. He was educated at Chipping Norton Grammar School and Ruskin College, Oxford with a TUC scholarship.

During the Second World War, he registered as a conscientious objector, but after appearances at both his Local and the Appellate Tribunals, he was permitted only exemption from combatant service, and was required to serve in the Non-Combatant Corps (NCC).

== Political career ==
Padley was a member of the National Council of the Independent Labour Party from 1940 to 1946. During this time, he contested the 1943 by-election in Acton, in which he was an (ILP) candidate, coming a distant second to the Conservative candidate. There was no Labour Party candidate, due to a pact between members of the wartime coalition. In 1950, Padley was elected as the Labour Member of Parliament for the party's safe seat of Ogmore, and served until the 1979 general election. He was a member of the party's National Executive Committee from 1956 to 1979.

In Parliament, he was Minister of State for Foreign Affairs from 1964 to 1967. Padley was also Chairman of the Labour Party from 1965 to 1966, and its Overseas Committee from 1963 to 1971.

== Personal life and death ==
In 1942, he married Sylvia Elsie Wilson; they had a son and daughter. He lived in Highgate, north London, and died on 15 April 1984, aged 67.

== Bibliography ==
- The Economic Problem of the Peace London: Gollancz (1944)
- Marcus Aurelius (pen name) Am I My Brother's Keeper? London: Gollancz (1945)
- Britain: Pawn or Power? London: Gollancz (1947)
- Soviet Russia: Free Union or Empire? Bombay: National Info. & Publications (1947)

Parliament of the United Kingdom
Preceded by John Evans	Member of Parliament for Ogmore; 1950–1979	Succeeded by Ray Powell
Trade union offices
Preceded by Percy Cottrell	President of USDAW; 1948–1964	Succeeded by Richard Seabrook
Party political offices
Preceded by Jack Hammond	London Division representative on the Independent Labour Party National Administrative Council; 1940–1946	Succeeded by Tom Colyer
Preceded by Ray Gunter	Chair of the Labour Party National Executive Committee; 1965–1966	Succeeded by John McFarlane Boyd
