= Joanne Thomas (trade unionist) =

British trade unionist and general secretary of Usdaw

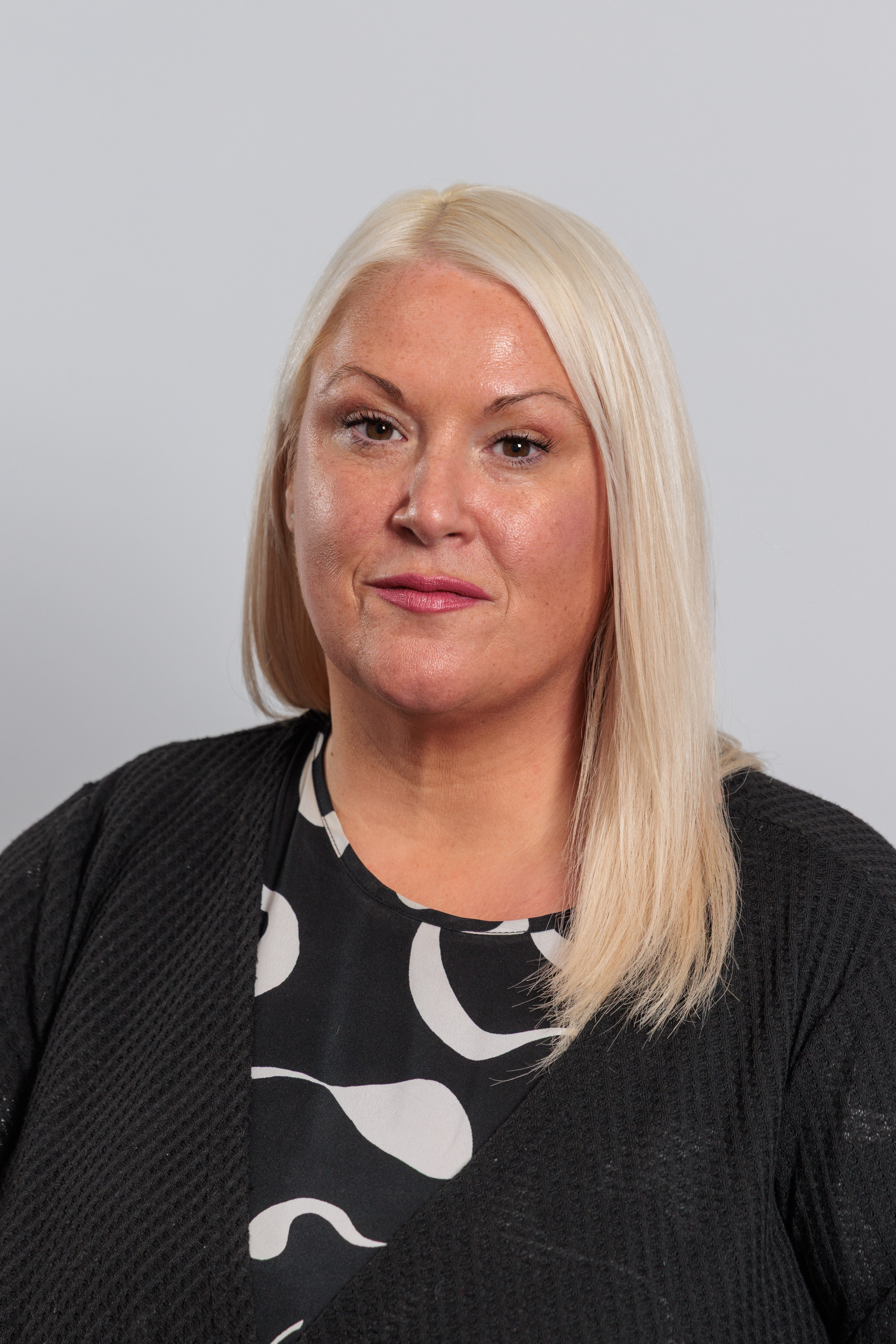
- Thomas in 2025

General Secretary of Usdaw
- Incumbent
- Assumed office 28 July 2025
- Deputy: Rab Donnelly
- Preceded by: Paddy Lillis

Personal details
- Occupation: Trade unionist
- Known for: First woman to lead Usdaw

Joanne Thomas is a British trade unionist who serves as the General Secretary of the Union of Shop, Distributive and Allied Workers. Elected in April 2025, she became the union's first female leader and took up office following the retirement of Paddy Lillis in July 2025. She formally began the role on 28 July 2025.

== Early life and career ==
Thomas grew up in Shiney Row, a former mining village near Durham. She joined Usdaw as a workplace representative while employed at wholesaler Makro, later becoming an Area Organiser in Newcastle and then the union's North East Regional Secretary. She was promoted at age 21 as the union's youngest-ever Area Organiser, responsible for more than 4,500 members and over 100 workplace representatives.

Beyond her union roles, Thomas has served on the Labour Party's National Executive Committee and chaired its organising committee; she has also been president of the TUC Yorkshire and Humber region.

== General Secretary of Usdaw ==
Usdaw announced Thomas's unopposed election as General Secretary on 14 April 2025. The union stated that outgoing General Secretary Paddy Lillis would retire on 25 July 2025, with Thomas succeeding him. She started in post on 28 July 2025.

Usdaw describes itself as one of the fastest-growing TUC affiliates and the UK's fifth-largest trade union, with around 360,000 members.

== Views and priorities ==
Ahead of taking office, Thomas said she wanted Usdaw to secure “practical solutions” as artificial intelligence expands in retail, and to step up organising in the gig economy. She has argued that a wealth tax should be considered to fund a fairer society and has said Usdaw would “hold Labour’s feet to the fire” when necessary while welcoming the incoming Employment Rights Bill.

She has been critical of Reform UK, calling it a populist party “writing out cheques they can’t cash” and urging scrutiny of its voting record.

In a 2025 interview with Asian Trader, Joanne Thomas discussed her priorities for Usdaw, including improving worker rights, addressing crime in retail, and ensuring the union listens to its members’ real concerns.

== Personal life ==
Thomas has spoken about becoming an Usdaw rep at 18 while struggling to make ends meet as a single mother, helping her to understand cost-of-living pressures faced by Usdaw members.
