= 2016 Ogmore by-election =

By-election to British Parliament held in Ogmore, Wales, in 2016

- 5 May 2016

Ogmore constituency
- Registered: 55,027
- Turnout: 42.8%
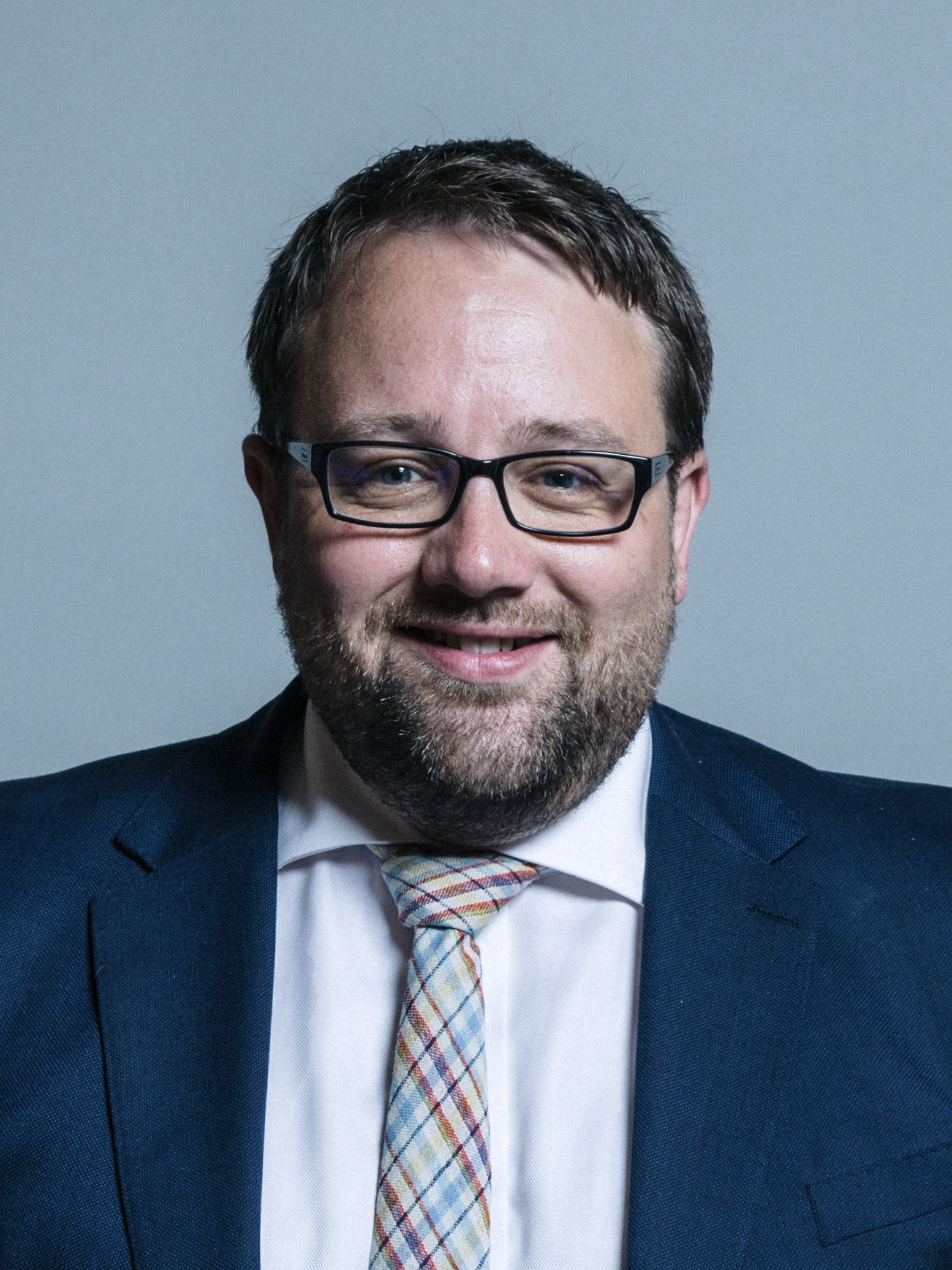
| | First party | Second party |
|---|---|---|
| Candidate | Chris Elmore | Glenda Davies |
| Party | Labour | UKIP |
| Popular vote | 12,383 | 3,808 |
| Percentage | 52.6% | 16.2% |
| Swing | ▼0.3pp | ▲1.2pp |
| | Third party | Fourth party |
| Candidate | Abi Thomas | Alex Williams |
| Party | Plaid Cymru | Conservative |
| Popular vote | 3,683 | 2,956 |
| Percentage | 15.7% | 12.6% |
| Swing | ▲5.6pp | ▼3.3pp |
MP before election
Huw Irranca-Davies
Labour
Elected MP
Chris Elmore
Labour

A by-election for the United Kingdom parliamentary constituency of Ogmore was held on 5 May 2016, triggered by the resignation of the incumbent Labour Party MP Huw Irranca-Davies following his decision to contest the coterminous Ogmore constituency in the 2016 Welsh Assembly election. Chris Elmore of the Labour held the seat with 52.6 per cent of the vote.

The by-election was held on the same day as the Welsh Assembly election, as well as elections for the Scottish Parliament, the Northern Ireland Assembly, for the Mayor and Assembly of London and in numerous local authorities in England. The 2016 Sheffield Brightside and Hillsborough by-election was also held on the same day.

== Background ==
The seat fell vacant after the incumbent MP, Huw Irranca-Davies of the Labour Party, chose to resign following his selection to contest the coterminous Ogmore constituency in the Welsh Assembly election. On 23 March 2016, Irranca-Davies was appointed Crown Steward and Bailiff of the Manor of Northstead the process by which resignations from the House of Commons are permitted. Irranca-Davies had been the MP for the seat since a previous by-election in 2002. Irranca-Davies had originally announced that he would seek Labour's nomination for the Welsh Assembly's Ogmore in October 2015, stating that if he was selected he would resign his Westminster seat. Irranca-Davies successfully contested his Assembly election. Irranca-Davies was not obliged to resign upon his nomination, though following the Wales Act 2014, which came into effect during the 2016 Assembly election, he would have had to resign his Westminster seat following his Assembly victory. Given that in both the Assembly and Westminster Ogmore was considered a safe seat for Labour his early resignation allowed the by-election to be held on the same day rather than forcing voters to go to the polls again a few weeks later.

== Candidates ==
Bridgend County Borough Council published the statement of persons nominated on 8 April 2016. This showed that five candidates that contested the election.

Councillor Chris Elmore, currently Cabinet Member for Children's Services and Schools in the Vale of Glamorgan Council, represented Labour. Elmore contested the Vale of Glamorgan constituency in 2015 general election, where he lost to the Conservatives.

The Conservatives selected Alex Williams, a town councillor in Ogmore. Glenda Davies was the candidate for UKIP, she also stood for the seat at the 2015 general election. She was the UKIP candidate for the Aberavon constituency in the Welsh Assembly election held on the same day.

Abi Thomas stood for Plaid Cymru. The Liberal Democrats selected Janet Ellard, a former teacher and now volunteer manager for a youth homeless charity.

The incumbent party (Labour) selected Chris Elmore as their candidate; Elmore prevailed in the election, winning the seat.

== Result ==
2016 Ogmore by-election
| Party | Candidate | Votes | % | ±% |
|---|---|---|---|---|
| Labour | Chris Elmore | 12,383 | 52.6 | −0.3 |
| UKIP | Glenda Davies | 3,808 | 16.2 | +1.2 |
| Plaid Cymru | Abi Thomas | 3,683 | 15.7 | +5.6 |
| Conservative | Alex Williams | 2,956 | 12.6 | −3.3 |
| Liberal Democrats | Janet Ellard | 702 | 3.0 | ±0.0 |
| Majority | | 8,575 | 36.4 | −0.6 |
| Turnout | | 23,532 | 43.0 | −20.7 |
| Registered electors | | 55,027 | | |
| Labour hold | | Swing | −0.8 | |

=== Previous result ===
General election 2015: Ogmore
| Party | Candidate | Votes | % | ±% |
|---|---|---|---|---|
| Labour | Huw Irranca-Davies | 18,663 | 52.9 | −0.9 |
| Conservative | Jane March | 5,620 | 15.9 | +0.3 |
| UKIP | Glenda Davies | 5,420 | 15.4 | +13.1 |
| Plaid Cymru | Tim Thomas | 3,556 | 10.1 | +0.5 |
| Liberal Democrats | Gerald Francis | 1,072 | 3.0 | −12.1 |
| Green | Laurie Brophy | 754 | 2.1 | N/A |
| TUSC | Emma Saunders | 165 | 0.5 | N/A |
| Majority | | 13,043 | 37.0 | −1.2 |
| Turnout | | 35,250 | 63.7 | +1.3 |
| Registered electors | | 55,572 | | |
| Labour hold | | Swing | −0.6 | |

== See also ==
- 1931 Ogmore by-election
- 1946 Ogmore by-election
- 2002 Ogmore by-election
- List of United Kingdom by-elections (2010–present)
