= Paddy Lillis =

Northern Irish trade union leader

Paddy Lillis is a trade union leader from Northern Ireland.

== Early life ==
Worked as a heavy goods vehicle driver at Abbey Meat Packers in Newtownabbey in the early 1980s, when he joined the Union of Shop, Distributive and Allied Workers (USDAW). In 1989, he became a full-time area organiser for the union, then in 1999 was appointed as its divisional officer for South Wales and Western England.

Elected deputy general secretary of Usdaw in 2004. He served on the National Executive Committee of the Labour Party and was Chair of the Labour Party in 2015/2016.

Elected unopposed as general secretary of Usdaw in November 2017 and took up the position in July 2018.

Trade union offices
Preceded by John Hannett	Deputy General Secretary of the Union of Shop, Distributive and Allied Workers; 2004–2018	Succeeded by Dave McCrossen
Preceded by John Hannett	General Secretary of the Union of Shop, Distributive and Allied Workers; 2018–2025	Succeeded by Joanne Thomas
Party political offices
Preceded by Jim Kennedy	Chair of the Labour Party; 2015–2016	Succeeded by Glenis Willmott
