= Garfield Davies, Baron Davies of Coity =

British peer (1935–2019)

The Right Honourable The Lord Davies of Coity CBE

Member of the House of Lords
- Lord Temporal
- Life peerage 1 October 1997 – 4 March 2019

Personal details
- Born: 24 June 1935
- Died: 4 March 2019 (aged 83)
- Party: Labour Co-operative

David Garfield Davies, Baron Davies of Coity, CBE (24 June 1935 – 4 March 2019) was a Labour Co-operative peer in the House of Lords and a former trade union leader.

== Biography ==
Davies left school at 15 and worked as an electrician, serving in the Royal Air Force 1956–58. In 1969 he became a full-time trade union official with USDAW and rose through the ranks, becoming General Secretary of the union in 1986. He retired in 1997.

Davies was named CBE in 1996 and created a life peer as Baron Davies of Coity, of Penybont in the County of Mid Glamorgan on 1 October 1997. Davies belonged to the Labour Friends of Israel lobby group.

Baron Davies of Coity died on 4 March 2019, aged 83.

Trade union offices
Preceded by Bill Whatley	General Secretary of USDAW; 1986–1997	Succeeded by Bill Connor
Preceded by Ada Maddocks	Trades Union Congress representative to the AFL-CIO; 1993	Succeeded by Tyrone O'Sullivan
