= Dick Seabrook =

British trade union leader and politician (1910-1986)

Richard B. Seabrook (1910 – 31 January 1986), known more commonly as Dick Seabrook, was a British trade union leader, communist activist, and politician.

== Biography ==
Seabrook grew up in Chelmsford, and worked repairing shoes for the Chelmsford Star Co-operative Society. He joined the National Union of Distributive and Allied Workers (NUDAW) in 1926, and in 1931 he also joined the Communist Party of Great Britain (CPGB). He was highly active in the party and the associated National Unemployed Workers' Movement. In 1932, he and his Alfred led five hundred unemployed workers to occupy the Shire Hall chamber. Also with Alfred, he revived the Chelmsford Trades Council in 1932, it having been dormant for several years.

In 1937, Seabrook began working full-time for NUDAW as an area organiser. Ten years later, NUDAW became part of the new Union of Shop, Distributive and Allied Workers (USDAW). Seabrook remained an area organiser, but was relocated to Norwich. He continued to be active in the CPGB, serving as district chairman and treasurer during the early 1950s.

Seabrook was elected to the executive council of USDAW in 1957. When union president Walter Padley was made a government minister in 1964, Seabrook won a special election to succeed him, but then lost the regularly scheduled election the following year, defeated by Rodney Hanes. In the 1967 presidential election, Seabrook won the position back and served in office until 1973 when he was defeated by Jim D. Hughes.

Seabrook opposed the Soviet invasion of Hungary in 1956, and it led to him resigning from the CPGB. He later became associated with the Chartist group. He was also active in the British Anti-Apartheid Movement. Despite not being a member of Norwich City Council, he was chosen in 1972 to be Lord Mayor of Norwich, the last non-council member to hold the post. He was described by Patrick Palgrave-Moore as "one of the most controversial figures in recent times to hold office".

On 31 January 1986, Dick Seabrook died at his Ipswich home. He was 75.

Trade union offices
| Preceded by Walter Padley | President of the Union of Shop, Distributive and Allied Workers; 1964–1965 | Succeeded by Rodney Hanes |
| Preceded by Rodney Hanes | President of the Union of Shop, Distributive and Allied Workers; 1967–1973 | Succeeded by Jim D. Hughes |
Civic offices
| Preceded by Donald Pratt | Lord Mayor of Norwich; 1972–1973 | Succeeded by Robert Symonds |
