= Huw Irranca-Davies =

Welsh politician (born 1963)

Huw Irranca-Davies MS
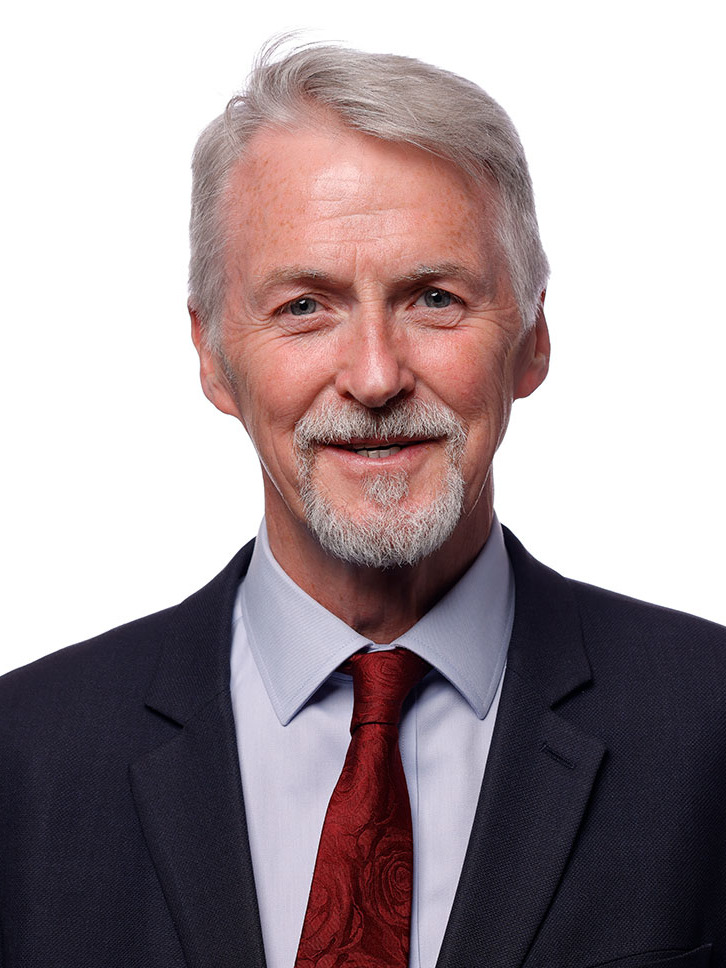
- Official portrait, 2026

Llywydd of the Senedd
- Incumbent
- Assumed office 12 May 2026
- Monarch: Charles III
- First Minister: Rhun ap Iorwerth
- Deputy: Kerry Ferguson
- Preceded by: Elin Jones

Deputy First Minister of Wales
- In office 6 August 2024 – 12 May 2026
- First Minister: Eluned Morgan
- Preceded by: Ieuan Wyn Jones (2011)
- Succeeded by: Sioned Williams
Former Welsh government positions
Cabinet Secretary for Climate Change and Rural Affairs
In office 21 March 2024 – 12 May 2026
First Minister	Vaughan Gething; Eluned Morgan
Preceded by	Julie James (Climate Change); Lesley Griffiths (Rural Affairs)
Succeeded by	Llyr Gruffydd (Rural Affairs)
Minister for Children, Older People and Social Care
In office 3 November 2017 – 13 December 2018
First Minister	Carwyn Jones
Preceded by	Rebecca Evans
Succeeded by	Dawn Bowden
Westminster positions
Chair of the Environmental Audit Select Committee
In office 18 June 2015 – 25 January 2016
Preceded by	Joan Walley
Succeeded by	Mary Creagh
Parliamentary Under-Secretary of State for Marine and Natural Environment
In office 5 October 2008 – 6 May 2010
Prime Minister	Gordon Brown
Preceded by	Jonathan Shaw
Succeeded by	Richard Benyon
Parliamentary Under-Secretary of State for Wales
In office 2 July 2007 – 5 October 2008
Prime Minister	Gordon Brown
Preceded by	Nick Ainger
Succeeded by	Wayne David

Member of the Senedd for Afan Ogwr Rhondda Ogmore (2016–2026)
- Incumbent
- Assumed office 5 May 2016
- Preceded by: Janice Gregory

Member of Parliament for Ogmore
- In office 14 February 2002 – 24 March 2016
- Preceded by: Ray Powell
- Succeeded by: Chris Elmore

Personal details
- Born: Ifor Huw Davies; 22 January 1963 (age 63) Gowerton, Swansea, Wales
- Party: Labour Co-op
- Spouse: Joanna Irranca (known as Joanna Irranca-Davies)
- Relations: Ifor Davies (grand-uncle)
- Children: 3
- Education: Crewe and Alsager College of Higher Education (BA); Swansea Metropolitan University (MSc)
- Occupation: Politician
- Website: www.huwirranca-davies.wales

Ifor Huw Irranca-Davies (né Davies; born 22 January 1963) is a Welsh Labour Co-op politician who has served as Llywydd of the Senedd since 2026, previously serving as Deputy First Minister of Wales from August 2024 to 2026, and as Cabinet Secretary for Climate Change and Rural Affairs from March 2024 to 2026. He has been the Member of the Senedd (MS) since 2016, first for Ogmore, and then Afan Ogwr Rhondda from 2026. Irranca-Davies was previously the Member of Parliament (MP) for Ogmore from 2002 to 2016.

Having served as Parliamentary Private Secretary in the Northern Ireland Office, the Department for Work and Pensions, and the Department of Culture, Media and Sport, he became an Assistant Whip in May 2006. On 29 June 2007, he was appointed Parliamentary Under-Secretary of State for Wales, before being promoted to the role of Parliamentary Under-Secretary of State in the Department for the Environment, Food and Rural Affairs. Irranca-Davies resigned his seat in parliament in March 2016 to stand to represent the constituency in the Senedd, winning the seat in the elections held in May 2016.

Irranca-Davies is a Patron on Brynawel Rehab in Llanharan.

== Early life ==
Irranca-Davies was born Ifor Huw Davies in 1963 to Teresa and Gethin Davies. He campaigned as a boy in general elections for his step great-uncle, Ifor Davies, MP for Gower and deputy to Cledwyn Hughes at the Welsh Office during Harold Wilson's government. He attended Gowerton Comprehensive School (where his mother was a secretary), and later earned a BA (Hons) at Crewe and Alsager College, and an MSc from Swansea Metropolitan University.

After leaving higher education, he worked for local authorities in leisure management; and it was while he was working in a sports centre and she was doing aerobics that he met his wife, Joanna Irranca, born to Italian parents who had come to work in South Wales in the 1950s. On marriage, the couple both changed their surnames to Irranca-Davies. The couple have three sons.

Later, he worked as a lecturer at Swansea Metropolitan University.

== Political career ==
=== UK Parliament ===
In 2001, Irranca-Davies was Labour candidate for the Brecon & Radnor constituency, but finished third, behind the Liberal Democrat and Conservative candidates. In the by-election of 14 February 2002 he was elected to represent the Ogmore constituency in the South Wales Valleys (a Labour seat since 1918), following the death of MP and Government Whip Sir Ray Powell. (Irranca-Davies was himself appointed Government Whip for Wales in May 2006 after spells as a Parliamentary Aide in several government departments.) He was re-elected to serve Ogmore in the general elections of 2005, 2010 and 2015.

While in Parliament, Irranca-Davies worked on a range of local and national issues, including sitting on the Procedures Select Committee to discuss ways of modernising the work of Parliament. He also sat on Standing Committees for a number of bills, including the Police Reform Act 2002, Fireworks Bill and Communications Bill, among others. He also held positions on the Welsh Grand Committee and the Northern Ireland Grand Committee. He worked on Parliamentary Labour Party ('PLP') Committees on Welsh Affairs, Foreign and Commonwealth Affairs, Home Affairs and International Development. He was also the backbench MP representative on the board of the Coal Health Claims Monitoring Subgroup for Wales.

Irranca-Davies has spoken in the House of Commons on topics as varied as international trade union rights, compulsory voting, anti-social behaviour, renewable energy and climate change, fair trade, social justice and poverty and inequality. In June 2005 he became Parliamentary private secretary (PPS) to Tessa Jowell, having previously served as PPS to Jane Kennedy at the Northern Ireland Office. He served as PPS to Ministers of the Department for Work and Pensions and Department for Culture, Media and Sport. He worked as Parliamentary Under-Secretary of State of Wales, and as an Environment Minister in the Department for Environment, Food and Rural Affairs (DEFRA). Between October 2010 and October 2011, he served as the Shadow Energy Minister where he led the Labour campaign on the protection of the Feed-In Tariff for solar power. In October 2011, he was appointed as the Shadow Minister on Food and Farming.

He belonged to a number of All Party Groups within Parliament, including the All Party Groups for British Council (Vice-chair), China Group, Citizens Advice, Clean Coal, Coalfield Communities, Energy Intensive Industries (Vice-chair), Manufacturing, Maritime and Ports, Steel and Metal Related Industry, Children in Wales, Patient and Public Involvement in Health and Social Care (Co-chair), University Group (Vice-chair), and Waterways (Co-chair). He served as Chair of the All Party Group for the Recognition of Munitions Workers which aims "work with the government to find a means of recognising those munitions workers who served during the first and second world wars"

On 19 June 2015, Irranca-Davies was elected to the chairmanship of the Environmental Audit Select Committee.

He was one of 36 Labour MPs to nominate Jeremy Corbyn as a candidate in the Labour leadership election of 2015. His last day as MP was on 24 March 2016. The Labour party candidate, Chris Elmore, won the 2016 Ogmore by-election to replace him.

=== Senedd ===
In October 2015, Irranca-Davies announced his wish to transition from Westminster to Cardiff Bay. In December 2015, he was selected to contest the Ogmore seat as a Welsh Labour and Co-operative Party candidate at the 2016 Welsh Assembly election. Irranca-Davies won the Assembly seat, with a majority of 9,468.

Irranca-Davies was elected chair of the Constitutional and Legislative Affairs Committee in June 2016, and was chair until his appointment as Minister for Children and Social Care in November 2017 by First Minister Carwyn Jones. He served in the role for just over a year, before returning to the backbenches in December 2018.

Following his re-election to the Senedd in 2021, Irranca-Davies was elected chair of the Legislation, Justice and Constitution Committee. He was also appointed chair of the Special Purpose Committee on Senedd Reform in October of that year, serving as chair of that committee until its dissolution in June 2022. The committee's recommendations led to the development and passage of legislation to increase the size of the Senedd and change its electoral system.

Irranca-Davies served as chair of the Legislation, Justice and Constitution Committee until his appointment in March 2024 as Cabinet Secretary for Climate Change and Rural Affairs in the Gething government.

In July 2024, after Vaughan Gething stood down as leader of the Welsh Labour party, Irranca-Davies was initially tipped as a candidate to replace him. However, Irranca-Davies declined to run for the leadership, instead forming a unity ticket with Eluned Morgan, under which he would be Deputy First Minister of Wales. Morgan was the only candidate to receive the required number of nominations, and therefore was elected leader of the Labour Party. He was appointed Deputy First Minister of Wales in August.

In the 2026 election, he was re-elected to the Senedd, representing the Afan Ogwr Rhondda constituency. As a result of Welsh Labour's losses at the election, he relinquished his role as a Welsh Minister at the first meeting of the Seventh Senedd. However, he was elected as Llywydd at the same meeting.

On 10 November 2026, Irranca-Davies, as the Llywydd, banned Joe Martin, a Reform UK Member of the Senedd, from speaking in the Senedd until Martin apologies for his statement on demography. Martin had asked for the government to comment on the "demographic replacement of white British people". The question was reviewed on whether it was acceptable for the Senedd, resulting in a ban, with Irranca-Davies stating Martin's question was "unnecessarily provocative and deliberately offensive". Following Martin's ban, Reform UK partially boycotted the Senedd on 11 November, limiting their participation only to the evening's votes.

=== Westminster Parliamentary and UK Government Offices held ===
- May 2005 – May 2006: Parliamentary Private Secretary to the Secretary of State for Culture, Media & Sport
- May 2006 – June 2007: Assistant Government Whip
- June 2007 – October 2008: Parliamentary Under Secretary of State for Wales
- October 2008 – May 2010: Parliamentary Under Secretary of State at the Department for Environment, Food and Rural Affairs (Defra)
  - October 2008 – June 2009: Natural Environment and Rural Affairs
  - June 2009 – May 2010: Marine and Natural Environment
- May 2010 – October 2010: Shadow Minister for Marine and Natural Environment (Shadow Defra Minister)
- October 2010 – October 2011: Shadow Minister for Energy and Climate Change
- October 2011 – May 2015: Shadow Minister for Food and Farming
- May 2015 – October 2015: Chair, Environmental Audit Select Committee

=== Senedd and Welsh Government offices held ===
- June 2016 – Nov 2017: Chair, National Assembly for Wales, Constitutional and Legislative Affairs Committee
- Nov 2017 – December 2018: Minister for Children and Social Care, Welsh Government
- June 2021 – March 2024: Chair, Legislation, Justice and Constitution Committee
- October 2021 – June 2022: Chair, Special Purpose Committee on Senedd Reform
- March 2024 – May 2026: Cabinet Secretary for Climate Change and Rural Affairs
- August 2024 – May 2026: Deputy First Minister of Wales
- May 2026 – present: Llywydd of the Senedd

== Awards ==
In 2005 he was voted the 48th sexiest man in Wales by the Western Mail.

In 2011, Irranca-Davies was shortlisted for the first Sports Parliamentarian of the Year award, an initiative introduced by the Sport and Recreation Alliance for the work he has done to promote archery. He was nominated by the Archery GB after he hosted the first sporting event to ever take place in Parliament in September 2011.

The event brought MPs and peers together as well as gold medallists such as Nicky Hunt on Speakers' Green for a day devoted to the sport.

In February 2013 Irranca-Davies was named Total Politics MP of the Month. He won the award for his work in standing up for farmers and consumers in the Ogmore constituency and across the nation by persuading the government to u-turn on the Groceries Code Adjudicator (GCA) Bill.

Parliament of the United Kingdom
Preceded by Raymond Powell	Member of Parliament for Ogmore; 2002–2016	Succeeded by Chris Elmore
Senedd
Preceded by Janice Gregory	Member of the Senedd for Ogmore; 2016–present	Incumbent
Vacant Title last held by Ieuan Wyn Jones	Deputy First Minister for Wales; 2024–present	Incumbent
