= John Hannett, Baron Hannett of Everton =

British trade unionist (born 1953)

The Right Honourable The Lord Hannett of Everton OBE
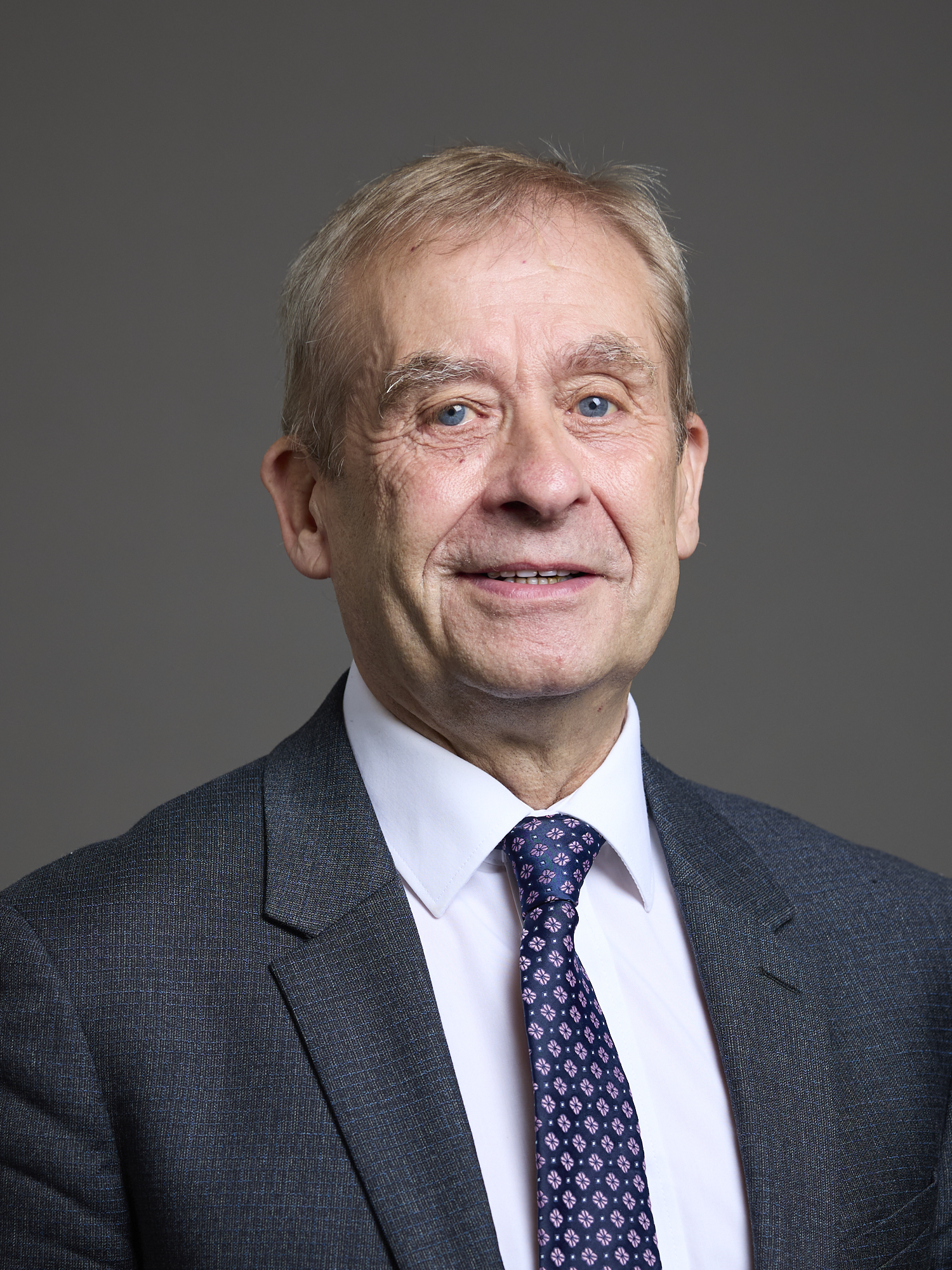
- Official portrait, 2024

Member of the House of Lords
- Lord Temporal
- Life peerage 12 March 2024

Personal details
- Born: John Hannett; 23 June 1953 (age 73) Liverpool, England
- Party: Labour
- Occupation: Trade unionist

John Hannett, Baron Hannett of Everton, OBE (born 23 June 1953) is a British trade unionist and formerly General Secretary of the Union of Shop, Distributive and Allied Workers (USDAW). He was appointed a member of the House of Lords in 2024.

== Early life and career ==
Hannett was born in Liverpool in 1953. He was a Low Pay Commissioner from 2007 to 2018. He is a former member of the TUC Executive Committee and General Council. Hannett represented Usdaw on the NEC of the Labour Party from 1998 to 2005. He is also a trustee of the People's History Museum in Manchester.

Hannett was General Secretary of Usdaw from May 2004 until June 2018, being re-elected in September 2008. Prior to this, he was Area Organiser from 1985, National Officer from 1990 and Deputy General Secretary from 1997.

Hannett was appointed an Officer of the Order of the British Empire (OBE) in the 2020 New Year Honours for services to the economy. He was nominated for a life peerage by Labour leader Sir Keir Starmer and was created Baron Hannett of Everton, of Bramley-Moore Dock in the City of Liverpool, on 12 March 2024. He was introduced to the House of Lords on 19 March.

== See also ==
- Paddy Lillis, General Secretary of USDAW
- Retail Week
- Martin Hannett, Manchester-born 1970s record producer
- Sunday Trading Act 1994
- Licensing Act 2003

Trade union offices
Preceded by Bill Connor	Deputy General Secretary of the Union of Shop, Distributive and Allied Workers; 1997–2004	Succeeded by Paddy Lillis
Preceded by Bill Connor	General Secretary of the Union of Shop, Distributive and Allied Workers; 2004–2018	Succeeded by Paddy Lillis
Orders of precedence in the United Kingdom
Preceded by The Lord Jamieson	Gentlemen; Baron Hannett of Everton	Followed by The Lord Tarassenko
