= Chris Elmore =

Welsh politician (born 1983)

Chris Elmore MP
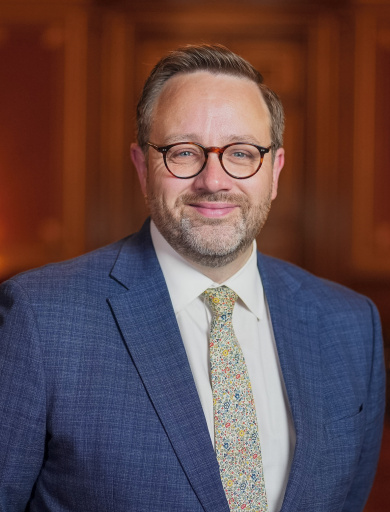
- Official portrait, 2025

Parliamentary Under-Secretary of State for the Americas, Multilateral and Human Rights (Note: Multilateral, Human Rights, Latin America and the Caribbean until July 2026)
- Incumbent
- Assumed office 7 September 2025
- Prime Minister: Keir Starmer; Andy Burnham
- Preceded by: The Baroness Chapman of Darlington

Comptroller of the Household
- In office 10 July 2024 – 7 September 2025
- Prime Minister: Keir Starmer
- Preceded by: Rebecca Harris
- Succeeded by: Nesil Caliskan
Shadow ministerial positions
Shadow Minister for Media, Data and Digital Infrastructure
In office 4 December 2021 – 22 July 2022
Leader	Keir Starmer
Preceded by	Office established
Succeeded by	Stephanie Peacock
Shadow Minister for Scotland
In office 9 April 2020 – 4 December 2021
Leader	Keir Starmer
Preceded by	Paul Sweeney
Succeeded by	Liz Twist

Member of Parliament
- Incumbent
- Assumed office 5 May 2016
- Preceded by: Huw Irranca-Davies
- Constituency: Ogmore (2016–2024); Bridgend (2024–present)
- Majority: 8,595 (20.8%)

Personal details
- Born: Christopher Philip James; Elmore; 23 December 1983 (age 42) Newport, Wales
- Party: Labour
- Education: Cardiff Metropolitan University
- Website: Official website

Christopher Philip James Elmore (born 23 December 1983) is a Welsh Labour Party politician who has served as the Member of Parliament (MP) for Bridgend, previously Ogmore, since 2016. He has been the Parliamentary Under-Secretary of State for the Americas, Multilateral and Human Rights since 2025.

== Early life and career ==
Christopher Elmore was born on 23 December 1983 in Newport and lived in Brynmawr and Caerphilly as a child.

He started his working life as a trainee butcher and later attended Cardiff Metropolitan University completing a degree in History and Culture in 2005. Elmore then worked in a number of professions including further education.

In 2008, Elmore was elected as a councillor for Casteland in the Vale of Glamorgan Council. Later he was appointed as a cabinet member for children's services and schools.

== Parliamentary career ==
Elmore stood as the Labour candidate in Vale of Glamorgan at the 2015 general election, coming second with 32.6% of the vote behind the incumbent Conservative MP Alun Cairns.

At the 2016 Ogmore by-election, Elmore was elected to Parliament as MP for Ogmore with 52.6% of the vote and a majority of 8,575.

In June 2016, Elmore joined the Justice Select Committee; he joined the Welsh Affairs Select Committee the following month. In October 2016, he was appointed to the frontbench position of Opposition whip.

He supported Owen Smith in the failed attempt to replace Jeremy Corbyn in the 2016 Labour Party leadership election.

While an MP, Elmore has particularly focused on issues that impact young people, often speaking in parliament and elsewhere on the subject. Youth engagement was an issue on which Elmore had previously campaigned as a councillor.

At the 2017 general election, Elmore was re-elected as MP for Ogmore with an increased vote share of 62.4% and an increased majority of 13,871.

In 2017, Elmore was elected as Chair of the All-Party Parliamentary Group on Rail in Wales. He has been a vocal opponent of the government's 2017 decision to cancel the planned electrification of the Great Western Mainline between Cardiff and Swansea. He has campaigned on issues including passenger safety.

Elmore was re-elected at the 2019 general election, with a decreased vote share of 49.7% and a decreased majority of 7,805.

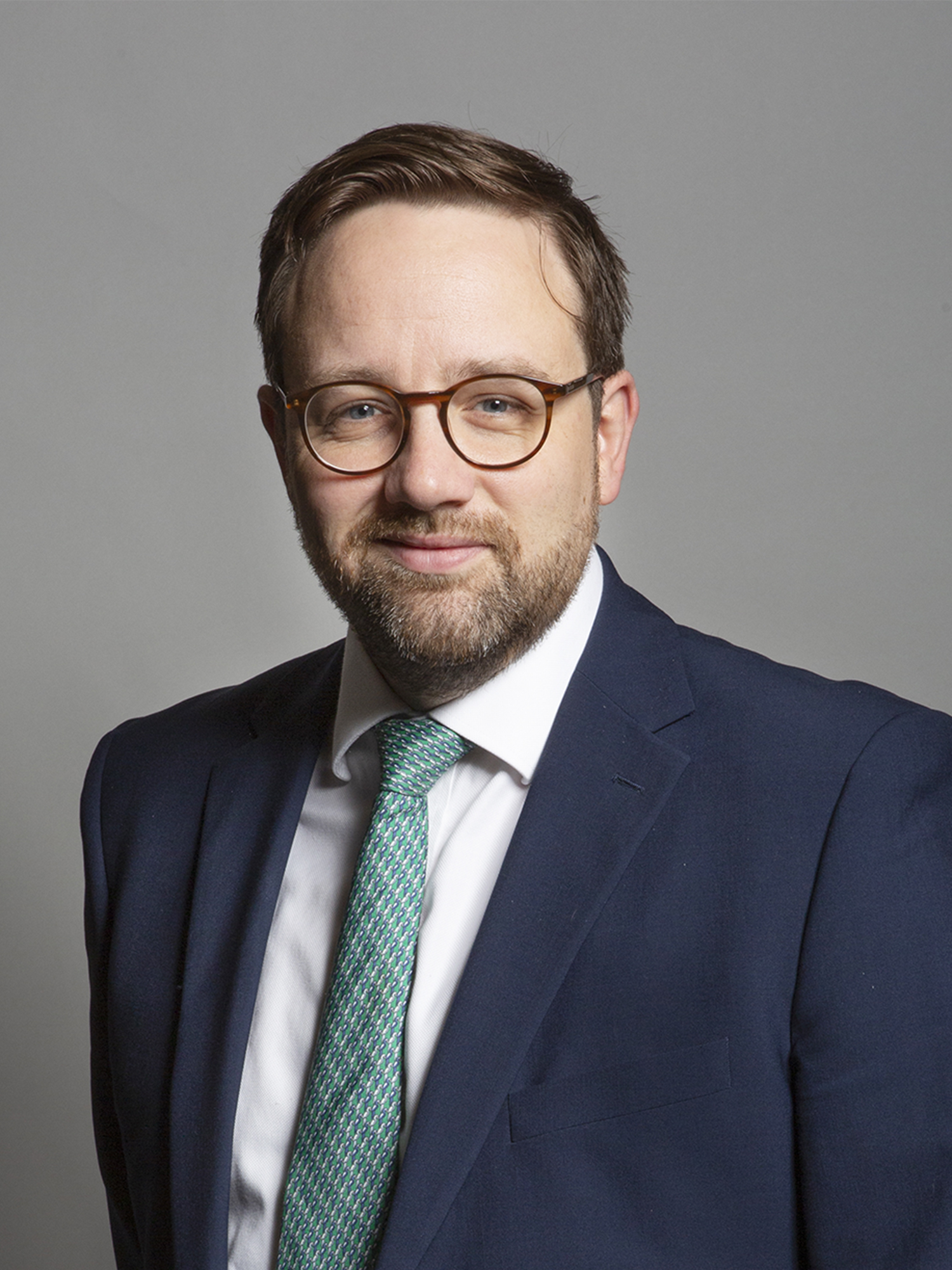
2019 MP portrait of Chris Elmore

In April 2020, Elmore was made Shadow Minister for Scotland by new Labour Party leader Keir Starmer. In this role he supported Ian Murray, Shadow Secretary of State for Scotland. He was also made a senior Opposition whip as a Shadow Lord Commissioner of HM Household.

Elmore is a member of Labour Friends of Israel.

Due to the 2023 Periodic Review of Westminster constituencies, Elmore's constituency of Ogmore was abolished, and its southern part transferred to Bridgend. At the 2024 general election, Elmore was elected to Parliament as MP for Bridgend with 39.9% of the vote and a majority of 8,595.

In November 2024, Elmore voted in favour of the Terminally Ill Adults (End of Life) Bill, which proposes to legalise assisted suicide.

Elmore was the appointed proxy voter for Dan Norris, the Labour MP for North East Somerset and Hanham. after Norris was banned from the Parliamentary Estate, due to being arrested on suspicion of rape, child sex offences, child abduction and misconduct in a public office in April 2025. Elmore acted as Norris' proxy voter from May 2025 to 1 July 2026.

== Notes ==
Parliament of the United Kingdom
Preceded by Huw Irranca-Davies	Member of Parliament for Ogmore; 2016–2024	Constituency abolished
Preceded by Katie Wallis	Member of Parliament for Bridgend; 2024–present	Incumbent
