= Ogmore (Senedd constituency) =

Senedd constituency (1999–2026)

Coordinates: 51°34′N 3°34′W

Ogmore Ogwr
- Former Senedd county constituency for the Senedd
- Ogmore shown as one of the 40; Senedd constituencies

Former Senedd county constituency
- Created: 1999
- Abolished: 2026
- Party: Labour
- MS: Huw Irranca-Davies
- Electoral region: South Wales West
- Preserved county: Mid Glamorgan and South Glamorgan

Ogmore (Welsh: Ogwr) was a constituency of the Senedd. It elected one Member of the Senedd by the first past the post method of election. It was one of seven constituencies in the South Wales West electoral region, which also elected four additional members, to produce a degree of proportional representation for the region as a whole.

== Boundaries ==
Map of 1999–2026 boundaries

The constituency was created for the first election to the Assembly, in 1999, with the name and boundaries of the Ogmore Westminster constituency. It was almost entirely within the preserved county of Mid Glamorgan, but takes in a very small area in South Glamorgan. It covered the area of Bridgend County Borough Council roughly north of the M4, and parts of Rhondda Cynon Taf County Borough Council. It included the communities of Cefn Cribwr, Garw Valley, Gilfach Goch, Llanharan, Maesteg, Ogwr Valley, Pencoed, Sarn and Tondu.

The other six constituencies of the region were Aberavon, Bridgend, Gower, Neath, Swansea East and Swansea West.

== Voting ==
In general elections for the Senedd, each voter had two votes. The first vote was used to vote for a candidate to become the Member of the Senedd for the voter's constituency, elected by the first past the post system. The second vote was used to vote for a regional closed party list of candidates. Additional member seats were allocated from the lists by the d'Hondt method, with constituency results being taken into account in the allocation.

== Assembly members and Members of the Senedd ==
Election	Member	Party	Portrait
1999	Janice Gregory	Labour	
2016	Huw Irranca-Davies	Labour	

== Elections ==
=== Elections in the 2020s ===
2021 Senedd election: Ogmore
Party	Candidate	Constituency			Regional		
Party	Candidate	Votes	%	±%	Votes	%	±%
Labour	Huw Irranca-Davies	12,868	52.5	–2.7	11,172	45.5	-2.4
Plaid Cymru	Luke Fletcher	4,703	19.2	+4.5	4,928	20.1	+2.5
Conservative	Nathan Adams	4,579	18.7	+7.6	4,385	17.9	+7.6
Abolish	Robin Hunter-Clarke	660	2.7	New	884	3.6	+0.3
Propel	Tim Thomas	625	2.6	New	410	1.7	New
Reform UK	Glenda Davies	618	2.5	New	304	1.2	New
Liberal Democrats	Cameron Shippam	441	1.8	–1.2	526	2.1	-1.5
Green					771	3.1	+1.1
UKIP					335	1.4	-18.5
Independent	Caroline Jones				353	1.4	N/A
Gwlad					208	0.8	New
Freedom Alliance (UK)					125	0.5	New
Communist					75	0.3	0.0
TUSC					56	0.2	-0.2
Majority		8,165	33.3	−7.2			
Turnout		24,494					
Labour hold		Swing					
Notes

Regional Ballot void votes: 154. Want of an Official Mark (0), Voting for more than ONE party or individual candidate (58), Writing or mark by which the Voter could be identified (0), Unmarked or Void for uncertainty (96)

=== Elections in the 2010s ===
Welsh Assembly Election 2016: Ogmore
Party	Candidate	Constituency			Regional		
Party	Candidate	Votes	%	±%	Votes	%	±%
Labour	Huw Irranca-Davies	12,895	55.2	-8.7	11,171	47.9	-6.2
Plaid Cymru	Tim Thomas	3,427	14.7	-2.0	4,097	17.6	+4.0
UKIP	Elizabeth Kendall	3,233	13.8	New	3,246	13.9	+9.6
Conservative	Jamie Wallis	2,587	11.1	-3.6	2,409	10.3	-1.9
Liberal Democrats	Anita Davies	698	3.0	-1.9	848	3.6	-0.2
Green	Laurie Brophy	516	2.2	New	455	2.0	+0.1
Abolish					780	3.3	New
Monster Raving Loony					151	0.6	New
TUSC					93	0.4	-0.1
Communist					66	0.3	-0.1
Majority		9,468	40.5	−6.7			
Turnout		23,356	42.9	+6.5			
Labour hold		Swing					

Welsh Assembly Election 2011: Ogmore
Party	Candidate	Constituency			Regional		
Party	Candidate	Votes	%	±%	Votes	%	±%
Labour	Janice Gregory	12,995	63.9	+12.2	10,892	54.1	+7.3
Plaid Cymru	Danny Clark	3,379	16.7	−0.3	2,733	13.6	-2.4
Conservative	Martyn Hughes	2,945	14.5	+2.8	2,455	12.2	+1.7
Liberal Democrats	Gerald Francis	985	4.9	−4.5	774	3.8	-4.3
Socialist Labour					1,117	5.5	+3.6
UKIP					861	4.3	+0.7
BNP					573	2.8	-1.9
Green					383	1.9	-0.8
Welsh Christian					165	0.8	New
TUSC					109	0.5	New
Communist					75	0.4	±0.0
Majority		9,576	47.2	+12.5			
Turnout		20,264	36.4	−3.6			
Labour hold		Swing	+6.3				

Regional ballots rejected: 145

=== Elections in the 2000s ===
Welsh Assembly Election 2007: Ogmore
Party	Candidate	Constituency			Regional		
Party	Candidate	Votes	%	±%	Votes	%	±%
Labour	Janice Gregory (Note: Incumbent member for this constituency)	11,761	51.7	−7.2	10,577	46.8	-5.7
Plaid Cymru	Sian M. Caiach	3,861	17.0	−3.1	3,623	16.0	-2.9
Conservative	Norma Lloyd-Nesling	2,663	11.7	+2.6	2,373	10.5	+1.8
Independent	Steve B. Smith	2,337	10.3	New			
Liberal Democrats	Martin Plant	2,144	9.4	±0.0	1,831	8.1	-1.2
BNP					1,066	4.7	New
UKIP					817	3.6	+1.9
Green					608	2.7	±0.0
Socialist Labour					434	1.9	-2.5
Joel Jenkins - Independent					338	1.5	New
Keith James - Independent					333	1.5	New
Socialist Alternative (UK)					189	0.8	New
Welsh Christian					178	0.8	New
Communist					90	0.4	New
Respect					74	0.3	New
CPA					55	0.2	New
Majority		7,900	34.7	−4.1			
Turnout		22,766	40.0	+6.5			
Labour hold		Swing	−2.1				

Welsh Assembly Election 2003: Ogmore
Party	Candidate	Constituency			Regional		
Party	Candidate	Votes	%	±%	Votes	%	±%
Labour	Janice Gregory	9,874	58.9	+10.7	8,859	52.5	
Plaid Cymru	Janet Davies	3,370	20.1	−7.0	3,198	18.9	
Liberal Democrats	Jacqueline Radford	1,567	9.4	+2.5	1,569	9.3	
Conservative	Richard J. Hill	1,532	9.1	+2.5	1,469	8.7	
Socialist Labour	Christopher Herriott	410	2.5	New	749	4.4	
Green					452	2.7	
UKIP					290	1.7	
Cymru Annibynnol					258	1.5	
ProLife Alliance					39	0.2	
Majority		6,504	38.8	+18.7			
Turnout		16,753	33.5	−8.0			
Labour hold		Swing	+8.9				

2003 Electorate: 49,565 List ballots rejected: 303

=== Elections in the 1990s ===
Welsh Assembly Election 1999: Ogmore
Party	Candidate	Votes	%	±%
Labour	Janice Gregory	10,407	48.2	N/A
Plaid Cymru	John D. Rogers	5,842	27.1	N/A
Independent	Ralph G. Hughes	2,439	11.3	N/A
Liberal Democrats	Sheila Ramsay-Waye	1,496	6.9	N/A
Conservative	Chris B. Smart	1,415	6.6	N/A
Majority		4,565	21.1	N/A
Turnout		21,599	41.5	N/A
Labour win (new seat)				
