= Ted Williams (politician) =

British Labour Party politician and diplomat

Sir Edward John Williams KCMG PC (1 July 1890 – 16 May 1963) was a British Labour Party politician and diplomat.

Williams was born in 1890 in Victoria, Ebbw Vale, Monmouthshire, to Emanuel Williams and his wife Ada (née James). He was the eldest of the surviving five of their eleven children. He attended school in Victoria and Hopkinstown, leaving without being able to read, and started work at Waunllwyd colliery, Ebbw Vale, at the age of 12.

Keen to educate himself, he rose to become secretary to a colliery company and in 1913 entered the Labour College in London as a student. After three years, Williams was appointed a provincial lecturer for the college, though the Great War disrupted the college and left him unemployed. Forced to return to mining in 1917, he became checkweigher and in 1919 miners' agent to the Garw district of the South Wales Miners' Federation.

He was elected as the MP for Ogmore at a by-election in May 1931, and represented the constituency until 1946. From 1946 to 1952 he served as High Commissioner to Australia.

Trade union offices
Preceded by Noah Ablett	Checkweighman at Mardy Colliery; 1917–1918	Succeeded by Arthur Horner
Preceded by Frank Hodges	Agent of the Garw District of the South Wales Miners' Federation; 1919–1931	Succeeded by Richard Benetta
Parliament of the United Kingdom
Preceded by Vernon Hartshorn	Member of Parliament for Ogmore; 1931–1946	Succeeded by John Evans
Diplomatic posts
Preceded by Sir Ronald Cross	High Commissioner to Australia; 1946–1952	Succeeded by Sir Stephen Holmes
