= 2002 Ogmore by-election =

2002 UK Parliamentary by-election

- 14 February 2002

Ogmore parliamentary seat
- Turnout: 58.2% (▼14.8%)

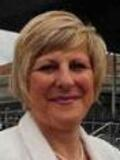

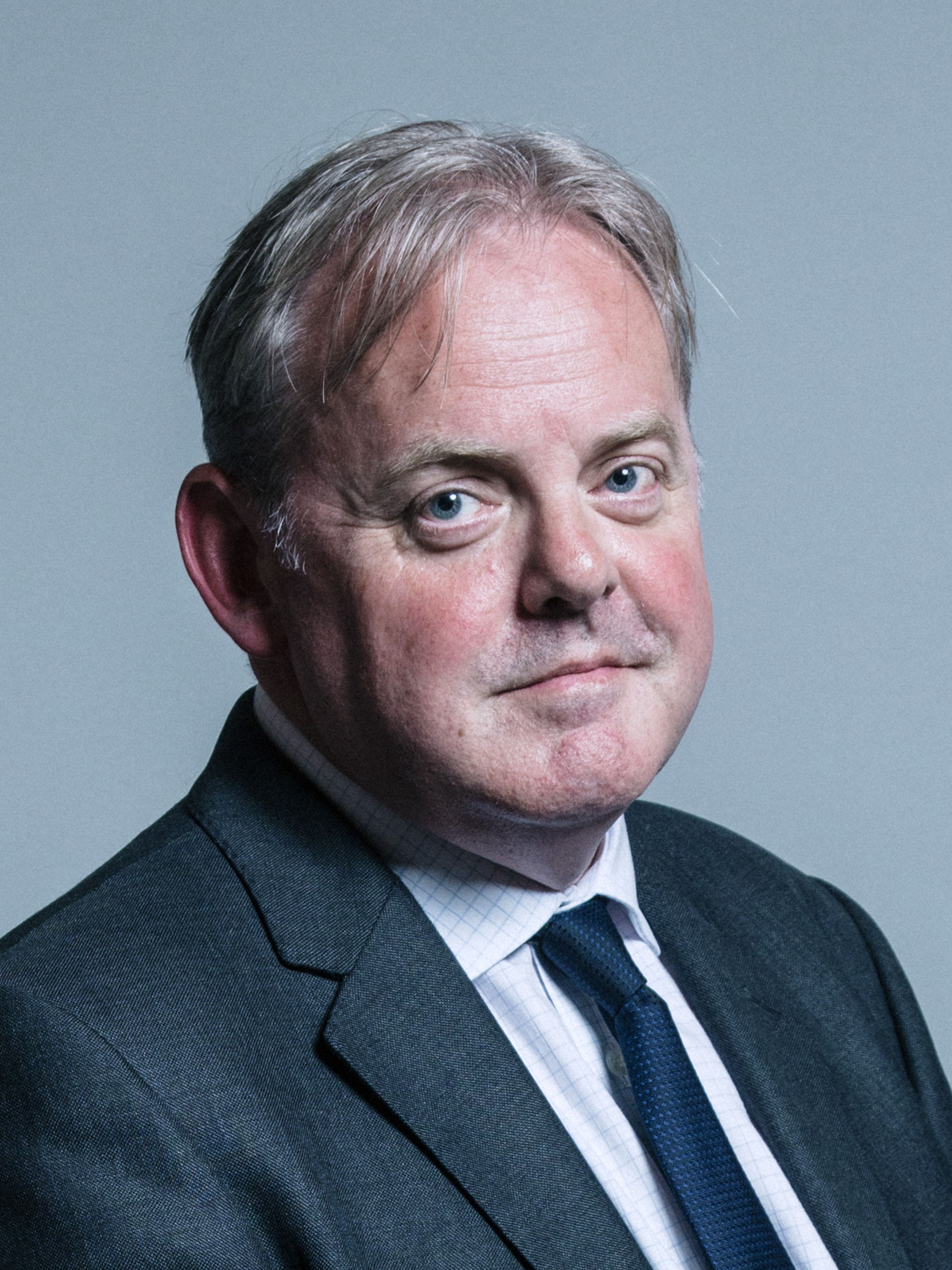
	First party	Second party	Third party
		PC
Candidate	Huw Irranca-Davies	Bleddyn Hancock	Veronica Watkins
Party	Labour	Plaid Cymru	Liberal Democrats
Popular vote	9,548	3,827	1,608
Percentage	52.0%	20.8%	8.8%
Swing	▼10.1%	▲6.8%	▼4.0%
	Fourth party	Fifth party
		SLP
Candidate	Guto Bebb	Christopher Herriot
Party	Conservative	Socialist Labour
Popular vote	1,377	1,152
Percentage	7.5%	6.3%
Swing	▼3.7%	N/A
MP before election
Raymond Powell
Labour
Subsequent MP
Huw Irranca-Davies
Labour

A by-election for the United Kingdom parliamentary constituency of Ogmore was held on 14 February 2002, triggered by the death of incumbent Labour Party MP Sir Raymond Powell on 7 December 2001. It was won by Huw Irranca-Davies, who held the seat for Labour.

Labour faced no realistic challenge in this very safe seat and retained it easily, with only Plaid Cymru making progress from their 2001 result. The Socialist Labour Party, who had not previously stood, achieved a good result for a minor party and retained their deposit.

== Electoral history ==
General election 2001: Ogmore
Party	Candidate	Votes	%	±%
Labour	Ray Powell	18,833	62.0	−11.9
Plaid Cymru	Angela Pulman	4,259	14.0	+7.0
Liberal Democrats	Ian Lewis	3,878	12.8	+3.6
Conservative	Richard Hill	3,383	11.1	+1.4
Majority		14,574	48.0	−16.2
Turnout		30,353	58.2	−14.8
Registered electors		52,185		
Labour hold		Swing	-9.5	

== Result ==
Ogmore by-election, 2002
Party	Candidate	Votes	%	±%
Labour	Huw Irranca-Davies	9,548	52.0	−10.1
Plaid Cymru	Bleddyn Hancock	3,827	20.8	+6.8
Liberal Democrats	Veronica Watkins	1,608	8.8	−4.0
Conservative	Guto Bebb	1,377	7.5	−3.7
Socialist Labour	Christopher Herriot	1,152	6.3	N/A
Green	Jonathan Spink	250	1.4	N/A
Socialist Alliance	Jeffrey Hurford	205	1.1	N/A
Monster Raving Loony	Leslie Edwards	187	1.0	N/A
New Millennium Bean Party	Captain Beany	122	0.7	N/A
Independent	David Braid	100	0.3	N/A
Majority		5,721	31.2	−16.8
Turnout		18,376	35.2	−23.0
Registered electors		52,209		
Labour hold		Swing	-8.4	

== See also ==
- 1931 Ogmore by-election
- 1946 Ogmore by-election
- 2016 Ogmore by-election
- Ogmore constituency
- List of United Kingdom by-elections
- United Kingdom by-election records
