= John Evans (Ogmore MP) =

Welsh politician

John Evans (10 September 1875 – 18 April 1961) was a Labour Party politician in the United Kingdom. He was elected as member of parliament (MP) for Ogmore at a by-election in 1946, but stood down at the 1950 general election.

John Evans, a fluent Welsh speaker, was elected MP for Ogmore in 1946, following a by-election, caused by the resignation of Ted Williams who had been appointed as high commissioner to Australia. It was said by many that at 70 years of age he was too old for the job but it is well to remember that Winston Churchill became prime minister for the second time at 76 and remained an MP into his eighties.

== Early life and career ==
John Evans was born at Cwmparc in the Rhondda Valley in September 1875 and attended the local Park Board School. He started work at twelve years of age in the local colliery where he remained for the next 20 years before winning a place at Ruskin College. On his return he became union secretary at Coegnant colliery, Maesteg. By now he was living at Nantyffyllon. He was elected to Maesteg UDC (1916–37) and Glamorgan CC (1913–46).

== Parliamentary career ==
In 1929 Evans stood unsuccessfully for parliament in Montgomeryshire, and in 1931 he failed to get the nomination for Ogmore losing out to Ted Williams.

At the age of 70 Evans succeeded Ted Willaims as MP for Ogmore having been elected at the by-election in 1946, following the appointment of Ted Williams as High Commissioner to Australia but stood down at the 1950 general election after failing to secure the nomination from the Ogmore Labour Party, for that years General Election. Walter Padley gained the nomination and went on to represent the seat for the next 29 years.

== Later life ==
Shortly after his non-selection, John Evans moved to Tongwynlais near Cardiff and from there won a seat on Glamorgan CC in 1952, at the age of 75.

John Evans died in 1961, aged 85.

Parliament of the United Kingdom
Preceded by Ted Williams	Member of Parliament for Ogmore; 1946–1950	Succeeded by Walter Padley
