= Union of Shop, Distributive and Allied Workers =

British trade union

Usdaw
- Union of Shop, Distributive and Allied Workers
- Predecessor: National Union of Distributive and Allied Workers; National Union of Shop Assistants, Warehousemen and Clerks
- Founded: 1 January 1947
- Headquarters: Voyager Building, 2 Furness Quay, Salford Quays, Manchester, M50 3XZ
- Location: United Kingdom
- Members: ▲368,563 (2024)
- Key people: Joanne Thomas, General Secretary; Jane Jones, President
- Affiliations: TUC, ICTU, STUC, Labour
- Website: www.usdaw.org.uk

The Union of Shop, Distributive and Allied Workers (Usdaw /ˈʌzdɔː/ UZ-daw) is a trade union in the United Kingdom, consisting of over 360,000 members, which specialises in the retail, distribution and logistics, food and drink manufacturing and customer contact sectors.

It is widely considered to be on the right-wing on the political spectrum, occupying the "politically conservative" section of the Labour Party. Usdaw is also affiliated to the Co-operative Party. In November 2021, the union was criticised at its refusal to negotiate with a Nottingham-based employer who was proposing a 'fire-and-rehire' policy leading to workers having to negotiate for themselves.

In September 2024, Usdaw won a Supreme Court battle against Tesco over so-called "fire and rehire" plans put forward by the supermarket giant. The row erupted in 2021 after Tesco proposed firing staff at some distribution centres and rehiring them on lower pay.

In June 2025, the union secured above-inflation pay rises for its members at Tesco, Tesco Bank, Sainsbury's, and Cooperative supermarkets.

== History ==
The union was formed in 1947 by the merger of the National Union of Distributive and Allied Workers and the National Union of Shop Assistants, Warehousemen and Clerks. Some other unions have since merged in, including the Amalgamated Society of Boot and Shoe Makers and Repairers in 1955, and the Scottish Union of Bakers and Allied Workers in 1978.

== Operations ==
Usdaw represents members individually and through company-wide agreements across retail and distribution, such as with The Co-op Societies, Tesco, Morrisons and Sainsbury’s.

Usdaw relies upon a "partnership" model with large employers such as with Tesco, where the management of both the business and the trade union have "privileged access" to their counterparts. This arrangement, coupled with its actions, has been met with criticism, such as where the union seemingly presents itself as being concerned more with maintaining its positive, comfortable position and easy membership supply than that of fair representation of its members. This attitude has earned the union the pejorative backronym of Useless Seven Days A Week amongst workers and trade unionists.

== Sectors ==
Usdaw organises primarily in retail and distribution, with membership in related service and manufacturing roles. Areas of representation include:

- Retail: supermarkets, convenience, department stores, fashion and specialist retail.
- Distribution and logistics: regional distribution centres and online fulfilment.
- Food and drink manufacturing: processing, packing and warehousing roles linked to major retailers.
- Customer contact: call centres, administrative and support offices.

Work across these sectors includes large numbers of part-time, temporary and shift roles, with significant evening and weekend working.

== Campaigns ==
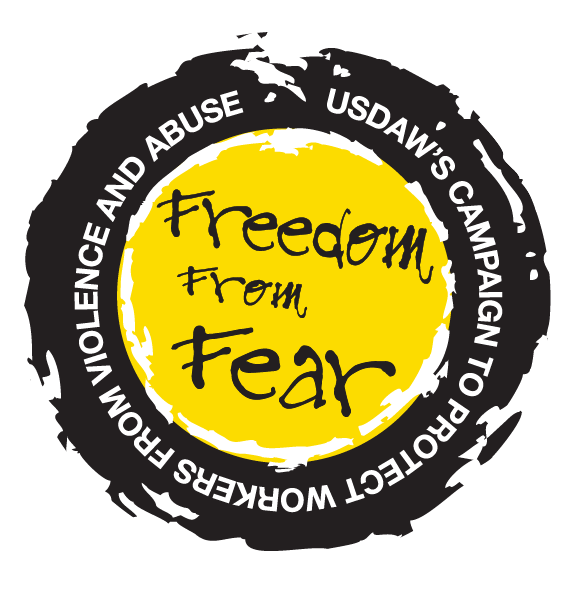
Logo for Usdaw's Freedom from Fear Campaign

=== Violence against retail workers ===
Usdaw has been campaigning against violence, threats and abuse experienced by retail workers since the early 2000s Activity includes an annual awareness campaign, including Respect Week each autumn, workplace surveys, and advocacy for clearer protections in law. which it has been praised for in the House of Commons, namely for its contributions towards the addition of a specific criminal offence of assault a shopworker in the Crime and Policing Bill in 2025.

=== National Minimum Wage ===
Usdaw was one of the main unions that campaigned for the introduction of the National Minimum Wage in the 1980s and 1990s. It was finally introduced by the Labour Government in 1999 and provides a legal minimum for workers in the UK on pay. In the 2024 General Election, Usdaw campaigned for a National Living Wage of £12 an hour. Usdaw also engages in consultations around the setting of both the National Living Wage and Real Living Wage, and has been calling for an end to ‘rip-off’ youth rates.

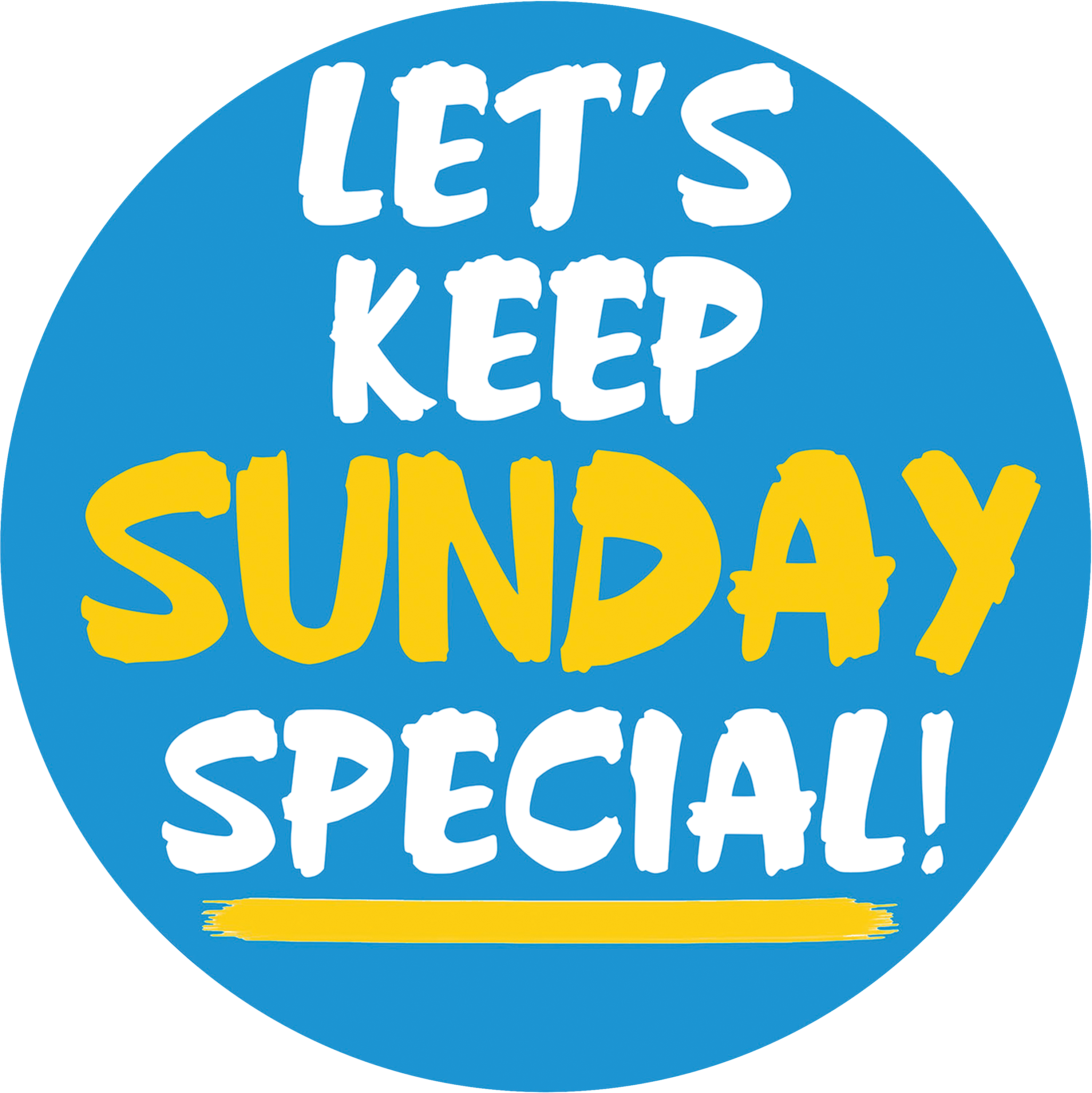
Logo for the Keep Sunday Special campaign

=== Keep Sunday Special ===
Usdaw has had a long-running campaign to prevent changes that would allow shops to stay open later in England and Wales. Before 1994, shops were prohibited from opening on a Sunday, and Usdaw successfully defeated the Conservative Government’s attempt to liberalise regulations through the 1986 Shops Bill. Since 1994, any shop over 280 square metres has been able to open for six hours on a Sunday. The campaign also successfully prevented further changes in 2006 and has lobbied against a recent pilot in Belfast, Northern Ireland.

=== Equality and inclusion ===
Usdaw has championed equality issues, both in workplaces and the union movement. It runs programmes to widen participation and address barriers faced by under-represented groups, including Black members, women, disabled and young workers, and LGBT+ members. This includes the Breaking Down Barriers development programme for black members, with the aim of increasing diversity among workplace reps and elected bodies. The programme has been highlighted as important by both the TUC and the Show Racism the Red Card campaign.

== Publications ==
USDAW produces a quarterly membership magazine for members, Arena, as well as a bimonthly magazine for union activists, Network.

=== 2022 annual survey report ===
Statistics taken from the USDAW 2022 annual survey of over 7,700 of its retail members showed that high levels of verbal abuse, threats and assaults were common in the industry. The survey also found the number of incidents has come down since the exceptionally high levels during the pandemic, but remain higher than pre-Covid levels in 2019.

== General Secretaries ==
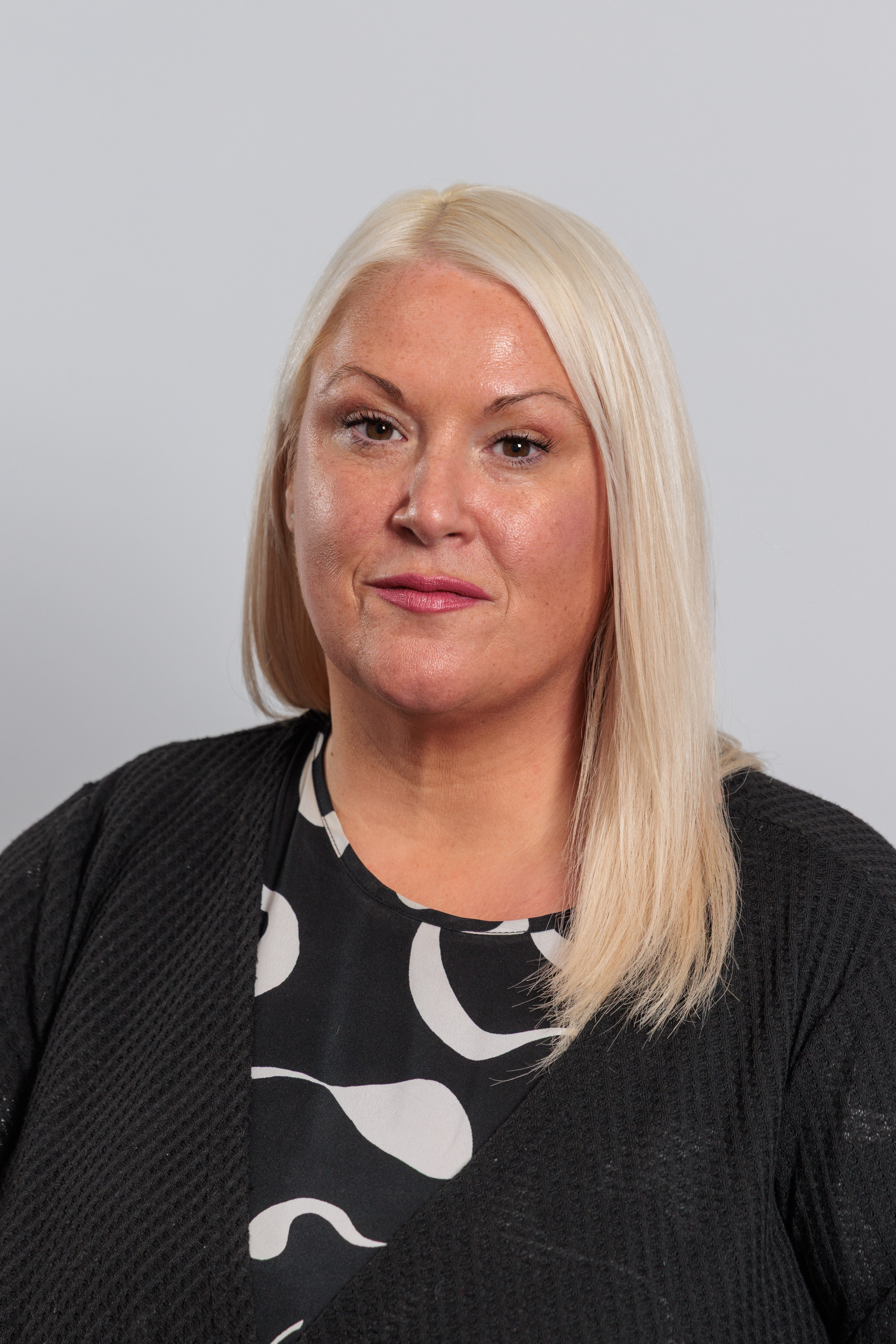
Joanne Thomas, current General Secretary of Usdaw

Since 1947, USDAW has had eight General Secretaries:

1947: Sir Joseph Hallsworth
1949: Sir Alan Birch
1962: Lord Allen of Fallowfield
1979: Bill Whatley
1986: Lord Davies of Coity
1997: Sir William Connor
2004: John Hannett
2018: Paddy Lillis
2025: Joanne Thomas

== Presidents ==
Since 1947, USDAW has had eleven Presidents:

1947: Percy Cottrell
1948: Walter Padley
1964: Dick Seabrook
1965: Rodney Haines
1967: Dick Seabrook
1974: Jim D. Hughes
1977: Sydney Tierney
1991: Audrey Wise
1997: Marge Carey, MBE
2006: Jeff Broome
2018: Amy Murphy
2021: Jane Jones

== Affiliations ==
Usdaw is affiliated to the Trades Union Congress (TUC). Within the UK, Usdaw is affiliated to the UK Labour Party and is represented at all levels, including at their national conference, NEC, policy forum, regional and constituency parties.
