= 1931 Ogmore by-election =

UK Parliamentary by-election

The Ogmore by-election of 1931 was held on 19 May 1931. The by-election was held due to the death of the incumbent Labour MP, Vernon Hartshorn. It was won by the Labour candidate Ted Williams, a miners' agent and a member of Glamorgan County Council.

Hartshorn had held the seat since 1918 and at the last general election, had been elected with a majority of over 11,000 over the second placed candidate, the Liberal D. L. Powell. On that occasion the Conservative candidate had come third, and J. R. Campbell, Communist, had finished in last place. Neither the Liberals nor the Conservatives fielded a candidate in the by-election, although the Conservatives would contest the seat at the general election a few months later.

== Result ==
1931 Ogmore by-election
Party	Candidate	Votes	%	±%
Labour	Edward Williams	19,356	78.8	+22.1
Communist	J. R. Campbell	5,219	21.2	+17.4
Majority		14,137	57.6	+30.1
Turnout		24,575	50.8	−32.0
Registered electors		48,406		
Labour hold		Swing		

== See also ==
- 1946 Ogmore by-election
- 2002 Ogmore by-election
- 2016 Ogmore by-election
