= 1946 Ogmore by-election =

UK parliamentary by-election

The 1946 Ogmore by-election was a parliamentary by-election held on 4 June 1946 for the British House of Commons constituency of Ogmore in Wales.

== Previous MP ==
The seat had become vacant on when the constituency's Labour Member of Parliament (MP), Edward Williams, had been appointed as High Commissioner to Australia. He had been the constituency's MP since the 1931 Ogmore by-election.

== Candidates ==
Labour selected John Evans, an official in the South Wales Miners' Federation who had stood unsuccessfully for the party in Montgomeryshire at the 1929 general election.

Plaid Cymru reselected Trefor Richard Morgan, a former coal miner who was working in farming. He had stood in the constituency in 1945, taking only 2,379 votes.

The Conservative Party decided against standing a candidate, a spokesman claiming that there was "not enough time" to do so. The Liberal Party also decided against a candidature and, despite a policy to fight by-elections in promising areas, the Communist Party of Great Britain also opted not to contest.

== Campaign ==
The Manchester Guardian observed that Morgan was putting "a great deal of effort" into his campaign, and hoped to attract votes from supporters of the Conservatives, Liberals and Communists. The paper speculated that, although he was likely to save his deposit, he would be likely to receive fewer than 4,000 votes, while Evans might take as many as 28,000.

== Result ==
1946 Ogmore by-election
Party	Candidate	Votes	%	±%
Labour	John Evans	13,632	70.6	−5.8
Plaid Cymru	Trefor Richard Morgan	5,685	29.4	+23.8
Majority		7,947	41.2	−17.2
Turnout		19,317	75.6	−0.1
Registered electors		57,401		
Labour hold		Swing		

== See also ==
- 1931 Ogmore by-election
- 2002 Ogmore by-election
- 2016 Ogmore by-election
- List of United Kingdom by-elections
- United Kingdom by-election records
