= Ogmore (UK Parliament constituency) =

UK Parliament constituency (1918–2024)

Coordinates: 51°34′N 3°34′W

- Former county constituency for the House of Commons
- Boundary of Ogmore in Wales
- Preserved county: Mid Glamorgan
- Electorate: 57,581 (December 2019)
- Major settlements: Maesteg, Pencoed

1918–2024
- Seats: One
- Created from: Mid Glamorganshire and South Glamorganshire
- Replaced by: Aberafan Maesteg, Bridgend, Pontypridd, and Rhondda and Ogmore
- Senedd: Ogmore, South Wales West

Ogmore (Welsh: Ogwr) was a constituency created in 1918, represented in the House of Commons of the UK Parliament. (Note: Ogmore is most specifically a county constituency (for the purposes of election expenses and type of returning officer))

The constituency was abolished as part of the 2023 periodic review of Westminster constituencies and under the June 2023 final recommendations of the Boundary Commission for Wales for the 2024 general election. Its wards were split between Aberafan Maesteg, Bridgend, Pontypridd, and Rhondda and Ogmore.

== Boundaries ==
Map of boundaries 2010–2024

1918–1983: The Urban Districts of Bridgend, Maesteg, Ogmore and Garw, as well as a part of the Rural District of Penybont.

1983–2010: The Borough of Ogwr wards of Bettws, Blackmill, Blaengarw, Caerau, Llangeinor, Llangynwyd, Maesteg East, Maesteg West, Nantyffyllon, Nant-y-moel, Ogmore Vale, Pencoed, Pontycymmer, St Bride's Minor, and Ynysawdre, and the Borough of Taff-Ely wards of Brynna, Gilfach Goch, Llanharan, and Llanharry.

2010–2024: The Bridgend County Borough electoral divisions of Aberkenfig, Bettws, Blackmill, Blaengarw, Bryncethin, Bryncoch, Caerau, Cefn Cribwr, Felindre, Hendre, Llangeinor, Llangynwyd, Maesteg East, Maesteg West, Nant-y-moel, Ogmore Vale, Penprysg, Pontycymmer, Sarn, and Ynysawdre, and those in Rhondda Cynon Taff County Borough of Brynna, Gilfach Goch, Llanharan, and Llanharry.

Taking its name from the River Ogmore, the constituency was close to the source of the river in the Ogwr valley, but it excluded the village of Ogmore-by-Sea, south-west of Bridgend (Pen-y-bont ar Ogwr). (Note: Ogmore-by-Sea forms part of the Vale of Glamorgan County Borough and of the Vale of Glamorgan constituency).) Ogmore constituency covered the area of Bridgend County Borough Council roughly north of the M4, and parts of Rhondda Cynon Taf County Borough Council. It included the communities of Cefn Cribwr, Garw Valley, Gilfach Goch, Llanharan, Maesteg, Ogwr Valley, Pencoed, Sarn, and Tondu.

Major boundary change

A substantial change of boundaries took effect in 1983, when the new constituency of Bridgend was created, centred on the town of that name, which was by then the largest settlement in Ogmore. The constituency since that date consisted of the northern part of the original constituency, together with wards from the former Borough of Taff-Ely (now Rhondda Cynon Taf CBC).

== History ==
Summary of winning results

The 2015 result made the seat the 44th-safest of Labour's 232 seats by percentage of majority. Successive candidates fielded by the Labour Party have won absolute majorities (pluralities) since the seat was created in 1918, or have run unopposed four times. The 2019 election was the first time in the seat's 101-year history that Labour failed to win an absolute majority, though the party still won with a margin of 22%

Opposition parties

Four parties have taken the runner-up position from and including a 2002 by-election, a total of five elections. At the 2015 general election the Liberal Democrat, Green and TUSC candidates did not win 5% of the vote apiece therefore forfeited their deposits. Those running for the Conservatives and UKIP in 2015 (and 2016 at the by-election held during the month before the UK's EU membership referendum) held their deposits. The highest polling of any runner-up, by percentage, was Thomas George Jones in 1931, winning 30.8% of the votes cast, 0.3% more than half the percentage polled by the winning candidate; this was when the Labour Party's vote was slightly split by the presence of a prominent Communist Party candidate and editor, Johnny Campbell. The government's dropping of a prosecution against him in 1924 had led to a General Election.

Turnout

Turnout at general elections has ranged between 85.3% in 1950 and 57.8% in 2005, falling to 35.2% in the 2002 by-election.

== Members of Parliament ==
Election	Member	Party
1918	Vernon Hartshorn	Labour
1931 by-election	Ted Williams	Labour
1946 by-election	John Evans	Labour
1950	Walter Padley	Labour
1979	Sir Ray Powell	Labour
2002 by-election	Huw Irranca-Davies	Labour
2016 by-election	Chris Elmore	Labour
2024	Constituency abolished	

== Elections ==
=== Elections in the 1910s ===
General election 1918: Ogmore
Party	Candidate	Votes	%	±%
Labour	Vernon Hartshorn	Unopposed		
Registered electors		35,910		
Labour win (new seat)				

=== Elections in the 1920s ===
General election 1922: Ogmore
Party	Candidate	Votes	%	±%
Labour	Vernon Hartshorn	17,321	55.8	N/A
National Liberal	John Walter Jones	7,498	24.1	N/A
Unionist	Dorothy Caroline Edmondes	6,257	20.1	N/A
Majority		9,823	31.7	N/A
Turnout		31,076	78.3	N/A
Registered electors		39,673		
Labour hold		Swing	N/A	

General election 1923: Ogmore
Party	Candidate	Votes	%	±%
Labour	Vernon Hartshorn	Unopposed		
Registered electors		40,284		
Labour hold				

General election 1924: Ogmore
Party	Candidate	Votes	%	±%
Labour	Vernon Hartshorn	Unopposed		
Registered electors		40,801		
Labour hold				

General election 1929: Ogmore
Party	Candidate	Votes	%	±%
Labour	Vernon Hartshorn	22,900	56.7	N/A
Liberal	Dapho Llewellyn Powell	11,804	29.2	N/A
Unionist	H Abbott	4,164	10.3	N/A
Communist	John Ross Campbell	1,525	3.8	N/A
Majority		11,096	27.5	N/A
Turnout		40,393	82.8	N/A
Registered electors		48,786		
Labour hold		Swing	N/A	

=== Elections in the 1930s ===
1931 Ogmore by-election
Party	Candidate	Votes	%	±%
Labour	Edward Williams	19,356	78.8	+22.1
Communist	John Ross Campbell	5,219	21.2	+17.4
Majority		14,137	57.6	+30.1
Turnout		24,575	50.8	−32.0
Registered electors		48,406		
Labour hold		Swing		

General election 1931: Ogmore
Party	Candidate	Votes	%	±%
Labour	Edward Williams	23,064	61.0	+4.3
Conservative	Thomas George Jones	11,653	30.8	+20.5
Communist	John Ross Campbell	3,099	8.2	+4.4
Majority		11,411	30.2	+2.7
Turnout		37,816	76.9	−5.9
Registered electors		49,203		
Labour hold		Swing		

General election 1935: Ogmore
Party	Candidate	Votes	%	±%
Labour	Edward Williams	Unopposed		
Registered electors		49,764		
Labour hold				

=== Elections in the 1940s ===
General election 1945: Ogmore
Party	Candidate	Votes	%	±%
Labour	Edward Williams	32,715	76.4	N/A
National	Owen Glyndwr Davies	7,712	18.0	N/A
Plaid Cymru	Trefor Richard Morgan	2,379	5.6	N/A
Majority		25,003	58.4	N/A
Turnout		42,806	75.7	N/A
Registered electors		56,552		
Labour hold		Swing	N/A	

1946 Ogmore by-election
Party	Candidate	Votes	%	±%
Labour	John Evans	13,632	70.6	−5.8
Plaid Cymru	Trefor Richard Morgan	5,685	29.4	+23.8
Majority		7,947	41.2	−17.2
Turnout		19,317	75.6	−0.1
Registered electors		57,401		
Labour hold		Swing		

=== Elections in the 1950s ===
General election 1950: Ogmore
Party	Candidate	Votes	%	±%
Labour	Walter Padley	35,836	74.7	−1.7
Conservative	Raymond Gower	9,791	20.4	N/A
Communist	Mavis Llewellyn	1,691	3.6	N/A
Welsh Republican Movement	Ithel Davies	631	1.3	N/A
Majority		26,045	54.3	−4.1
Turnout		47,949	85.3	+9.6
Registered electors		56,184		
Labour hold		Swing		

General election 1951: Ogmore
Party	Candidate	Votes	%	±%
Labour	Walter Padley	37,022	76.9	+2.2
Conservative	Percy Lunniss Powell	9,504	19.7	−0.7
British Empire Party	Trefor David	1,643	3.4	N/A
Majority		27,518	57.2	+2.9
Turnout		48,169	84.9	−0.4
Registered electors		56,726		
Labour hold		Swing		

General election 1955: Ogmore
Party	Candidate	Votes	%	±%
Labour	Walter Padley	33,275	75.6	−1.3
Conservative	Derek Geoffrey Jennings	10,751	24.4	+4.7
Majority		22,524	51.2	−6.0
Turnout		44,026	78.6	−6.3
Registered electors		55,976		
Labour hold		Swing		

General election 1959: Ogmore
Party	Candidate	Votes	%	±%
Labour	Walter Padley	35,170	74.7	−0.9
Conservative	Tom O. Ewart-Jones	11,905	25.3	+0.9
Majority		23,265	49.4	−1.8
Turnout		47,075	82.3	+3.7
Registered electors		57,192		
Labour hold		Swing		

=== Elections in the 1960s ===
General election 1964: Ogmore
Party	Candidate	Votes	%	±%
Labour	Walter Padley	34,178	72.9	−1.8
Conservative	Ralph Morgan Thomas	10,238	21.8	−3.5
Plaid Cymru	Margaret Tucker	2,470	5.3	N/A
Majority		23,940	51.1	+1.7
Turnout		46,886	79.7	−2.6
Registered electors		58,848		
Labour hold		Swing		

General election 1966: Ogmore
Party	Candidate	Votes	%	±%
Labour	Walter Padley	33,545	71.3	−1.6
Conservative	Ralph Morgan Thomas	6,872	14.6	−7.2
Liberal	Jennie Thomas Gibbs	6,632	14.1	N/A
Majority		26,673	56.7	+5.6
Turnout		47,049	78.4	−1.3
Registered electors		60,003		
Labour hold		Swing		

=== Elections in the 1970s ===
General election 1970: Ogmore
Party	Candidate	Votes	%	±%
Labour	Walter Padley	33,436	67.3	−4.0
Conservative	Antony F. Gardner	10,415	21.0	+6.4
Plaid Cymru	Edward John Merriman	5,828	11.7	N/A
Majority		23,021	46.3	−10.4
Turnout		49,679	75.6	−2.8
Registered electors		65,731		
Labour hold		Swing		

General election February 1974: Ogmore
Party	Candidate	Votes	%	±%
Labour	Walter Padley	28,372	52.8	−14.5
Liberal	Jennie Gibbs	10,819	20.1	N/A
Conservative	R K Jones	9,416	17.5	−3.5
Plaid Cymru	Edward John Merriman	5,139	9.6	−2.1
Majority		17,553	32.7	−13.6
Turnout		53,746	79.8	+4.2
Registered electors		67,354		
Labour hold		Swing		

General election October 1974: Ogmore
Party	Candidate	Votes	%	±%
Labour	Walter Padley	30,453	59.5	+6.7
Conservative	R.K. Jones	8,249	16.1	−1.4
Liberal	Jennie Gibbs	8,203	16.0	−4.1
Plaid Cymru	D.I. Jones	4,290	8.4	−1.2
Majority		22,204	43.4	+10.7
Turnout		51,195	75.4	−4.4
Registered electors		67,927		
Labour hold		Swing		

General election 1979: Ogmore
Party	Candidate	Votes	%	±%
Labour	Ray Powell	29,867	53.4	−6.1
Conservative	L Walters	13,780	24.6	+8.5
Liberal	Jennie Gibbs	9,812	17.5	+1.5
Plaid Cymru	D I Jones	2,450	4.4	−4.0
Majority		16,087	28.8	−14.6
Turnout		55,909	79.7	+4.3
Registered electors		70,156		
Labour hold		Swing		

=== Elections in the 1980s ===
General election 1983: Ogmore
Party	Candidate	Votes	%	±%
Labour	Ray Powell	23,390	59.2	+5.8
Liberal	John Parsons	6,026	15.3	−2.2
Conservative	Richard O'Sullivan	5,806	14.7	−9.9
Plaid Cymru	Edward Merriman	3,124	7.9	+3.5
Ecology	Noel Thomas	1,161	2.9	N/A
Majority		17,364	43.9	+15.1
Turnout		39,507	76.9	−2.8
Registered electors		51,378		
Labour hold		Swing		

General election 1987: Ogmore
Party	Candidate	Votes	%	±%
Labour	Ray Powell	28,462	69.4	+10.2
Conservative	Michael Barratt	6,170	15.0	+0.3
SDP	Mairwen James	3,954	9.6	−5.7
Plaid Cymru	John Jones	1,791	4.4	−3.5
Independent Labour	Thomas Spence	652	1.6	N/A
Majority		22,292	54.4	+10.5
Turnout		41,029	80.1	+3.2
Registered electors		51,255		
Labour hold		Swing		

=== Elections in the 1990s ===
General election 1992: Ogmore
Party	Candidate	Votes	%	±%
Labour	Ray Powell	30,186	71.7	+2.3
Conservative	David G. Edwards	6,359	15.1	+0.1
Liberal Democrats	John Warman	2,868	6.8	−2.8
Plaid Cymru	Laura McAllister	2,667	6.3	+1.9
Majority		23,827	56.6	+2.2
Turnout		42,080	80.6	+0.5
Registered electors		52,195		
Labour hold		Swing	+1.1	

General election 1997: Ogmore
Party	Candidate	Votes	%	±%
Labour	Ray Powell	28,163	74.0	+2.3
Conservative	David A. Unwin	3,716	9.8	−5.3
Liberal Democrats	Kirsty Williams	3,510	9.2	+2.4
Plaid Cymru	John D. Rogers	2,679	7.0	+0.7
Majority		24,447	64.2	+7.6
Turnout		38,068	72.9	−7.7
Registered electors		52,193		
Labour hold		Swing	+3.8	

=== Elections in the 2000s ===
General election 2001: Ogmore
Party	Candidate	Votes	%	±%
Labour	Ray Powell	18,833	62.0	−12.0
Plaid Cymru	Angela Pulman	4,259	14.0	+7.0
Liberal Democrats	Ian Lewis	3,878	12.8	+3.6
Conservative	Richard Hill	3,383	11.1	+1.3
Majority		14,574	48.0	−16.2
Turnout		30,353	58.2	−14.7
Registered electors		52,185		
Labour hold		Swing	−9.5	

2002 Ogmore by-election
Party	Candidate	Votes	%	±%
Labour	Huw Irranca-Davies	9,548	52.0	−10.0
Plaid Cymru	Bleddyn Hancock	3,827	20.8	+6.8
Liberal Democrats	Veronica Watkins	1,608	8.8	−4.0
Conservative	Guto Bebb	1,377	7.5	−3.6
Socialist Labour	Christopher Herriot	1,152	6.3	N/A
Green	Jonathan Spink	250	1.4	N/A
Socialist Alliance	Jeffrey Hurford	205	1.1	N/A
Monster Raving Loony	Leslie Edwards	187	1.0	N/A
New Millennium Bean Party	Captain Beany	122	0.7	N/A
Independent	David Braid	100	0.3	N/A
Majority		5,721	31.2	−16.8
Turnout		18,376	35.2	−23.0
Registered electors		52,209		
Labour hold		Swing	−8.4	

Following the death of Sir Ray Powell on 7 December 2001 a by-election was held on 14 February 2002.

General election 2005: Ogmore
Party	Candidate	Votes	%	±%
Labour	Huw Irranca-Davies	18,295	60.4	−1.6
Liberal Democrats	Jackie Radford	4,592	15.2	+2.4
Conservative	Norma Lloyd-Nesling	4,243	14.0	+2.9
Plaid Cymru	John Williams	3,148	10.4	−3.6
Majority		13,703	45.2	−2.8
Turnout		30,278	57.8	−0.4
Registered electors		52,349		
Labour hold		Swing	−2.0	

=== Elections in the 2010s ===
General election 2010: Ogmore
Party	Candidate	Votes	%	±%
Labour	Huw Irranca-Davies	18,664	53.8	−7.1
Conservative	Emma Moore	5,398	15.6	+1.4
Liberal Democrats	Jackie Radford	5,260	15.2	+0.5
Plaid Cymru	Danny Clark	3,326	9.6	−0.6
BNP	Kay Thomas	1,242	3.6	N/A
UKIP	Carolyn Passey	780	2.3	N/A
Majority		13,246	38.2	−7.1
Turnout		34,650	62.4	+2.9
Registered electors		55,527		
Labour hold		Swing	−4.3	

General election 2015: Ogmore
Party	Candidate	Votes	%	±%
Labour	Huw Irranca-Davies	18,663	52.9	−0.9
Conservative	Jane March	5,620	15.9	+0.3
UKIP	Glenda Davies	5,420	15.4	+13.1
Plaid Cymru	Tim Thomas	3,556	10.1	+0.5
Liberal Democrats	Gerald Francis	1,072	3.0	−12.2
Green	Laurie Brophy	754	2.1	N/A
TUSC	Emma Saunders	165	0.5	N/A
Rejected ballots		72		
Majority		13,043	37.0	−1.2
Turnout		35,250	63.7	+1.3
Registered electors		55,572		
Labour hold		Swing	−0.6	

Of the 72 rejected ballots:

- 51 were either unmarked or it was uncertain who the vote was for.
- 21 voted for more than one candidate.

2016 Ogmore by-election
Party	Candidate	Votes	%	±%
Labour	Chris Elmore	12,383	52.6	−0.3
UKIP	Glenda Davies	3,808	16.2	+0.8
Plaid Cymru	Abi Thomas	3,683	15.7	+5.6
Conservative	Alex Williams	2,956	12.6	−3.3
Liberal Democrats	Janet Ellard	702	3.0	±0.0
Majority		8,575	36.4	−0.6
Turnout		23,532	43.0	−20.7
Registered electors		55,027		
Labour hold		Swing	−0.8	

General election 2017: Ogmore
Party	Candidate	Votes	%	±%
Labour	Chris Elmore	23,225	62.4	+9.5
Conservative	Jamie Wallis	9,354	25.1	+9.2
Plaid Cymru	Huw Marshall	2,796	7.5	−2.6
UKIP	Glenda Davies	1,235	3.3	−12.1
Liberal Democrats	Gerald Francis	594	1.6	−1.4
Rejected ballots		55		
Majority		13,871	37.3	+0.3
Turnout		37,204	65.1	+1.4
Registered electors		57,125		
Labour hold		Swing	+0.2	

Of the 55 rejected ballots:

- 36 were either unmarked or it was uncertain who the vote was for.
- 19 voted for more than one candidate.

General election 2019: Ogmore
Party	Candidate	Votes	%	±%
Labour	Chris Elmore	17,602	49.7	−12.7
Conservative	Sadie Vidal	9,797	27.7	+2.6
Brexit Party	Christine Roach	2,991	8.5	N/A
Plaid Cymru	Luke Fletcher	2,919	8.3	+0.8
Liberal Democrats	Anita Davies	1,460	4.1	+2.5
Green	Tom Muller	621	1.8	N/A
Rejected ballots		96		
Majority		7,805	22.0	−15.3
Turnout		35,390	61.5	−3.6
Registered electors		57,581		
Labour hold		Swing	−7.6	

Of the 96 rejected ballots:

- 64 were either unmarked or it was uncertain who the vote was for.
- 32 voted for more than one candidate.

== See also ==
- Ogmore (Senedd constituency)
- 1931 Ogmore by-election
- 1946 Ogmore by-election
- 2002 Ogmore by-election
- 2016 Ogmore by-election
- List of parliamentary constituencies in Mid Glamorgan
- List of parliamentary constituencies in Wales
