= List of political parties in Wales =

There are a number of political parties registered to the Electoral Commission in Wales. Some of these parties have elected representation in the Senedd (Welsh Parliament; Welsh: Senedd Cymru) and/or in Westminster (UK Parliament) and some have elected representation in one or more of the 22 Welsh local authorities, while others have entirely no elected representation. This Wikipedia page lists all of the above and some relevant Welsh political parties that formerly existed but have since disbanded. The largest political parties typically reside in either the House of Commons or the Senedd, the current largest party in Wales is Plaid Cymru, followed closely by Reform UK Wales. With Welsh Labour, the Welsh Conservatives, the Wales Green Party and Welsh Liberal Democrats all having representation in the Senedd.

== House of Commons/Senedd ==
=== House of Commons ===
The Parliament of the United Kingdom is a legislative body in the United Kingdom and creates primary legislation. There are two chambers within the Parliament of the United Kingdom: the House of Commons (the elected chamber) and the House of Lords. This article focuses on the House of Commons. Three parties have elected representatives in that house (MPs): Welsh Labour, Welsh Liberal Democrats and Plaid Cymru. Since the 2024 general election, there has been no elected MPs from the Welsh Conservatives.

=== Senedd ===
The Senedd was formed under the Government of Wales Act 1998, by the Labour government, following a referendum in 1997. It was given greater powers under the 2011 Welsh devolution referendum. As of 2026, six parties have representation in the Senedd with Plaid Cymru being the largest party, albeit short of a majority with 43 seats. The Welsh Labour Party, traditionally dominant in Wales, holds 9 seats. Reform UK Wales is currently the second largest party with 34 seats. In the 2026 Senedd election the Welsh Greens obtained their first seats, winning two. The Welsh Liberal Democrats currently have only one seat, held by Jane Dodds. The Welsh Conservatives have a comparatively low seat share, having only seven seats.

=== House of Commons/Senedd parties ===
Party	Leader	Political position	Ideology	MSs	MPs	Local government	Membership (Note: Political parties are under no legal obligation to publish membership statistics and there is no uniformly recognised definition of membership.) (date)
Plaid Cymru; English: Party of Wales	Rhun ap Iorwerth	Centre-left to to left-wing	Welsh nationalism Welsh independence Social democracy	43 / 96	4 / 32	201 / 1,234	c.10,000 (2022)
Reform UK Wales; Welsh: Diwygio DU Cymru	Helen Jenner	Right-wing to far-right	Right-wing populism Euroscepticism; British unionism	34 / 96	0 / 32	23 / 1,234	7,800 (January 2025)
Welsh Labour (Note: Some candidates stand as Labour and Co-operative joint candidates due to an electoral alliance with the Co-operative Party.); Welsh: Llafur Cymru	Ken Skates	Centre-left	Social democracy British unionism	9 / 96	27 / 32	482 / 1,234	18,000 (2023)
Welsh Conservatives; Welsh: Ceidwadwyr Cymreig	Darren Millar	Centre-right to right-wing	Conservatism; Economic liberalism British unionism	7 / 96	0 / 32	102 / 1,234	Unknown
Wales Green Party (Note: The Wales Green Party is not an individually registered party, but rather a subdivision of the Green Party of England and Wales); Welsh: Plaid Werdd Cymru	Anthony Slaughter	Left-wing	Green politics Progressivism; Welsh independence	2 / 96	0 / 32	14 / 1,234	8,000+ (March 2026)
Welsh Liberal Democrats; Welsh: Democratiaid Rhyddfrydol Cymru	Jane Dodds	Centre to centre-left	Liberalism; Social liberalism British unionism Pro-Europeanism	1 / 96	1 / 32	67 / 1,234	Unknown

== Local government ==
Several parties in Wales have no national representation, but have elected representation at the local government level.

=== County councils ===
Party	Translation	Elected members of local government	Political position	Ideology
Llantwit First Independents	Welsh: Annibynwyr Cyntaf Llantwit	4 (Vale of Glamorgan Council)	N/A	
Newport Independents Party	Welsh: Plaid Annibynwyr Casnewydd	3 (Newport City Council)	N/A	
Uplands Party	Welsh: Plaid Uplands	2 (Swansea Council)	N/A	
Propel		1 (Cardiff Council)	None	Welsh nationalism Welsh independence Sovereignism
Gwlad	English: Country	1 (Ceredigion County Council)	Centre-right	Welsh nationalism Welsh independence
Trade Unionist and Socialist Coalition		1 (Wrexham County Borough Council)	Left-wing to far-left	Socialism; Trade unionism

=== Community and town councils ===
Party	Translation	Elected members of local government	Political position	Ideology
Gwlad	English: Country	2	Centre-right	Welsh nationalism Welsh independence

=== Council control ===
Council	Control		Web	Total	LAB	PC	CON	LD	GP	REF	Other	Vacant
Blaenau Gwent	LAB	maj	URL	33	19				1	1	12 (Note: 11 Independents)	
Bridgend	LAB	maj	URL	51	26	1					24 (Note: 21Independents)	
Caerphilly	LAB	maj	URL	69	42	19			1		7 (Note: 6 Independents)	
Cardiff	LAB	maj	URL	79	50	2	9	10	1	1	6 (Note: 1 Propel)	
Carmarthenshire	NOC	IND+PC	URL	75	15	37			1	2	20 (Note: 19 Independents)	
Ceredigion	PC	maj	URL	38		21		7			10 (Note: 9 Independents and 1 Gwlad)	
Conwy	NOC	IND+PC+LAB	URL	55	7	8 (Note: 1 ex-Independent)	8	4	1	2	25 (Note: 23 Independents including 1 ex-Plaid, 2 ex-Conservative)	
Denbighshire	NOC	LAB+PC	URL	48	14	8	8		2		15	1
Flintshire	NOC	IND+LAB	URL	67	27		1	3		4	31 (Note: 34 Independent Alliance including Plaid Cymru and Independents)	1
Gwynedd	PC	maj	URL	69		45		1			23 (Note: 21 independents, 6 Llais Gwynedd)	
Isle of Anglesey	PC	maj	URL	35	3	19		1		1	11 (Note: 12 Independents)	
Merthyr Tydfil	NOC	LAB min	URL	30	14 (Note: 1 ex-Independent)					1	15 (Note: 16 Independents)	
Monmouthshire	NOC	LAB min	URL	46	21		19		1		5 (Note: 5 Independents)	
Neath Port Talbot	NOC	IND+PC	URL	60	26	11		3	1		19 (Note: 19 Independents leading administration)	
Newport	LAB	maj	URL	51	33		7	1	2		8 (Note: 8 Independents, 5 Non aligned & 3 Newport Independents)	
Pembrokeshire	IND	IND+LAB+PC	URL	60	9	3	11	2		1	33 (Note: 19 Independents, 16 non-aligned)	1
Powys	NOC	LD+LAB	URL	68	9 (Note: 1 ex-Conservative)	4	13	22 (Note: 1 ex-Conservative)	1	4	15 (Note: 17 Independents)	
Rhondda Cynon Taf	LAB	maj	URL	75	58	8	2		1		6 (Note: 6 Independents)	
Swansea	LAB	maj	URL	75	43		4	13	1	1	11 (Note: 12 Independents, 4 non-aligned Uplands Party)	2
Torfaen	LAB	maj	URL	40	28					4	8 (Note: 8 Independents and 3 Reform UK)	
Vale of Glamorgan	NOC	LAB+IND	URL	54	24	8	13				9 (Note: 8 dependents, 4 Llantwit Independents and 1 non-aligned in administration with Labour, 4 non-aligned.)	
Wrexham	NOC	IND+CON	URL	56	14	7	7			1	27 (Note: 23 Independents, 22 ruling Independent Group & 3 non-aligned)	
Total				1,234	482	201	102	67	14	23	340	5

== Parties with no elected representation ==
=== Notable registered parties ===
Party	Translation	Political position	Ideology
Abolish the Welsh Assembly Party	Welsh: Plaid Diddymu Cynulliad Cymru	Single-issue	Welsh Parliament abolition Anti-devolution
Communist Party of Britain	Welsh: Plaid Gomiwnyddol Prydain	Far-left	Communism; Marxism–Leninism
Social Democratic Party		Syncretic	Social democracy Social conservatism Communitarianism; Euroscepticism
Socialist Party Wales	Welsh: Plaid Sosialaidd Cymru	Far-left	Revolutionary socialism Trotskyism; Marxism
UK Independence Party	Welsh: Plaid Annibyniaeth y DU	Right-wing to far-right	Euroscepticism; Right-wing populism National conservatism Economic liberalism British nationalism
Welsh Christian Party	Welsh: Plaid Gristnogol Cymru	Right-wing	Christian right Social conservatism British unionism Euroscepticism

== Defunct parties ==
- South Wales Socialist Society (1911–1920) - amalgamated with the Communist Party of Great Britain in the 1920s.
- Communist Party of South Wales and the West of England (1920) - set up by those who opposed amalgamation with the Communist Party of Great Britain.
- Cynon Valley Party (2016–2020).
- Welsh Republican Movement (1949–1966) - most members either returned to Plaid Cymru or joined the Labour Party.
- Welsh Socialist Republican Movement (1979–1986) - succeeded as a political party in 1986 by Cymru Goch, however it still exists as a publication.
- Cymru Goch (1986–2003) - evolved into Forward Wales.
- Democratic Alliance of Wales (1999–2008).
- John Marek Independent Party (2003) - short lived party which became Forward Wales.
- Forward Wales (2003–2010).
- Blaenau Gwent People's Voice Group (2005–2010) - party set-up in Blaenau Gwent. Its leader, Dai Davies, retired from politics and the party disbanded.
- Putting Llanelli First (2011–2016) - Siân Caiach (now a councillor for Gwlad) ran for the party in the Welsh Assembly seat of Llanelli in 2011 and 2016.
- Respect - The Unity Coalition (2004–2016) - a party established by Salma Yaqoob and George Monbiot and built out of the Stop the War Coalition, its most notable candidate was George Galloway.
- Welsh Socialist Alliance (1999–2016) an alliance between the Socialist Party and Cymru Goch and some independents, which fell apart when the Socialist Party left the grouping.
- Women's Equality Party (2015–2024) a feminist political party in the United Kingdom.

== See also ==
- Elections in Wales
- Politics of Wales
- Electoral Commission (United Kingdom)
- Political make-up of local councils in Wales
- Welsh devolution
- Welsh republicanism
