= Gethin ap Gruffydd =

Welsh nationalist (1946–2025)

- Gethin ap Gruffydd in 2016
- Born: Keith Griffiths; 11 April 1946; Merthyr Tydfil
- Died: 18 September 2025 (aged 79)
- Other name: Gethin ap Iestyn
- Political party: Cymru Goch
- Other political affiliations: Plaid Cymru
- Movement: Free Wales Army; National Patriotic Front; Welsh Socialist Vanguard; Cofiwn
- Spouse: Sian Ifan
- Children: 3

Gethin ap Gruffydd (Welsh pronunciation: [ˈɡɛθɪn ap ˈɡrɨfɨð]); born Keith Griffiths, also known as Gethin ap Iestyn; 11 April 1946 – 18 September 2025) was a Welsh republican nationalist activist. Born in Merthyr Tydfil, Wales, he was known for his involvement in Welsh political and cultural movements, notably the National Patriotic Front (NPF) and Free Wales Army (FWA). He had three children with his partner, Sian Ifan.

== Anti-Sais Front/Patriotic Front 1964–1969 ==
After leaving school, Gruffydd found work at a textile wholesaler in Bath, Somerset, where he became a member of Plaid Cymru. In 1964 he relocated to Fishguard in Pembrokeshire, waiting seven months in preparation for Plaid Cymru's summer conference. In Fishguard, Gruffydd's characteristic approach to political action drew notice for the first time when he tore down Union Jack bunting at a local fête. At the Fishguard conference, Gruffydd first met his long term ally, Cwmbran bus conductor Toni Lewis. Together, they formed the Anti-Sais Front (lit. 'Anti-English front').

I and a few others thought we must attempt something in South Wales to rally people towards nationalism, but obviously being English-speakers it couldn't be done through the Welsh language. [...] ...we formed an organization called the Anti-Sais Front, which wasn't anti-English as such, but anti-Anglicisation, and we took much of our inspiration for it from developments in the Flemish areas of Belgium, and from the French-Canadians of Quebec, where the militancy was just emerging strongly. We tried to make the Front patriotic but not in the Welsh language alone."

— Gethin ap Gruffydd

The Anti-Sais Front later merged with other Welsh nationalist groups to form the National Patriotic Front, established with the goal of recruiting from the predominately English-speaking communities of Wales that were perceived to be neglected by the likes of Plaid Cymru and Cymdeithas yr Iaith Gymraeg. There was some overlap in membership and activities between the NPF and the Free Wales Army, with Gethin ap Gruffydd and Tony Lewis being members of both, and the latter having designed the FWA uniform. By July 1966 they had publicly dissociated themselves from the militant gestures of the FWA, seeking instead to create a political pressure group within Plaid Cymru. The Patriotic Front quickly gained support, with several branches set up across the South Wales Valleys, such as in Aberdare, the Rhondda and Cwmbran, where Tony Lewis opened a club named "The Patriot's Rest" in the Pontnewydd area. Gruffydd stated that the intended objective of the Patriotic Front was for it to become "...incorporated into Plaid Cymru to cater for the more militant, or positive elements within the party." However, in July 1966, Plaid Cymru president Gwynfor Evans was elected to the House of Commons as the MP for Carmarthen and, following this first taste of mainstream political success, the party was in no mood to accommodate the exuberant strain of uniformed militancy emerging at its fringes. The NPF sent as many of its members as possible to Plaid Cymru's next conference in Maesteg, with the entire front row of the hall comprising a fully uniformed contingent (the uniform consisted of green sidecap, khaki shirt and black trousers). Despite an allegedly positive reaction from Evans, others within Plaid Cymru took a negative view of the Patriotic Front and, following a dispute surrounding the use of funds generated by The Patriot's Rest, the NPF was outlawed by the party at its 1966 Dolgellau conference.

Gruffydd and Lewis created a number of offshoot nationalist organizations designed to appeal to particular interests. Cymdeithas Llywelyn (Welsh for 'Llywelyn society') sought to remember Llywelyn ap Gruffydd, the last native Welsh Prince of Wales; the Young Patriots League was successful in recruiting numbers of youths; the Lost Lands Liberation League would agitate for the return to Welsh status of areas lost to England, across the counties of Cheshire, Gloucestershire, Herefordshire, Monmouthshire and Shropshire. Cofiwn Glyndŵr (Welsh for 'Remember Glyndŵr') brought together various organizations, including the FWA, Cymdeithas yr Iaith Gymraeg and others for a 1967 parade through the streets of Machynlleth. Anticipating a clampdown on their activities by Special Branch and the British authorities, the Patriots Aid Committee raised funds in support of the families of imprisoned activists.

== Trial and imprisonment ==
In 1966, Gruffydd and several others decided to leave the Free Wales Army, disagreeing with the publicity-seeking antics of leader Dennis Coslett. Despite continuing to work with (and later re-joining) the Free Wales Army, in his private correspondence with the FWA's Julian Cayo-Evans, Gruffydd expressed concern over some of the FWA's modus operandi, rightly predicting that it would eventually prove counter-productive.

Wales had seen a spate of bombings in the lead-up to the Investiture of Prince Charles at Caernarfon Castle on 1 July 1969. The FWA was happy to falsely claim responsibility, and nine members were arrested, including Tony Lewis and Gethin ap Gruffydd. Leaders Coslett and Cayo-Evans were charged with offences under the Public Order Act, including firearms and explosive charges, receiving sentences of fifteen months. Gethin ap Gruffydd was given a not guilty verdict on public order charges; he pleaded guilty to organising the Free Wales Army and received a nine-month sentence.

Most of those tried gave various undertakings, including never to become involved in paramilitary activity, to never handle weapons illegally, to never advocate the use of violence for political ends, etc. Of the nine arrested members of the Free Wales Army, only Gethin ap Gruffydd refused to give any such declaration.

Following release from prison and subsequent exile in Ireland, Gruffydd returned to Britain and to political activity - a period documented by Class War's Ian Bone. In his memoir Bash the Rich, Bone describes how he '..got to know (Gruffydd) when I flirted with socialist republicanism in the mid-1970s'. At this time, Gruffydd had set up the Welsh Socialist Vanguard, which included veteran Welsh republican Pedr Lewis and was based at Pencoed near Bridgend. Bone and Gruffydd went on to find common cause in the newly formed Cymru Goch Mk.I. In Bone's words:

The organisation never amounted to much [...] but Gethyn ap Iestyn (Gethin ap Gruffydd) proved to be a solid socialist [...] giving the lie to the belief that all FWA members had been right wing semi-fascists. In fact, Gethyn ap Iestyn was probably the only person within the FWA who had some idea how to build a political movement. He'd started to build up an anti-investiture campaign and proved to be an honourable and committed revolutionary and still remains so.

== Cofiwn 1970–1984 ==
Together with fellow activist and partner, Sian Ifan, Gruffydd became a principal figure behind the 'non-political nationalist organisation' Cofiwn (Remember) and Ty Cenedl, which sought to raise nationalist fervour through greater cultural-historical awareness.

'Operation Fire'. On Palm Sunday 1980 fifty-six people were raided and arrested by police; most of the detainees were involved with Cofiwn. Outrage at the repressive action lead to the creation of the Welsh Campaign for Political and Civil Liberties, which drew support from numerous organizations including Plaid Cymru and the Labour Party, Cymdeithas yr Iaith, and the Welsh Socialist Republican Movement. Most of those rounded-up were released within a week, but four were prosecuted.

Cofiwn's last major action was its response to the Wales Festival of Castles. Held in 1983 and sponsored by the Welsh Tourist Board, it was pointed out that the festival concentrated suspiciously heavily upon various of Edward I's castles, built during the Norman conquest. Cofiwn countered with a program of actions, Sarhad '83 (Insult '83).

Continued police interest saw to the group's dissolution by 1984.

== Cilmeri ==
The Patriotic Front was instrumental in creating an annual commemorative event each December at Cilmeri, to mark the killing there in 1282 of Llewelyn the Last. Since the 1960s, the role of organizing the Cilmeri weekend has passed through various hands; however, Gruffydd remained a persistent presence at the commemoration throughout most of his life.
