= Kinnock =

Kinnock is a surname of Scottish origin.

== Notable people ==
- Neil Kinnock (born 1942), British Labour Party politician
- Glenys Kinnock (1944–2023), British politician, wife of Neil
- Stephen Kinnock (born 1970), British politician, son of Neil and Glenys
