= Allan Rogers (British politician) =

British politician (1932–2023)

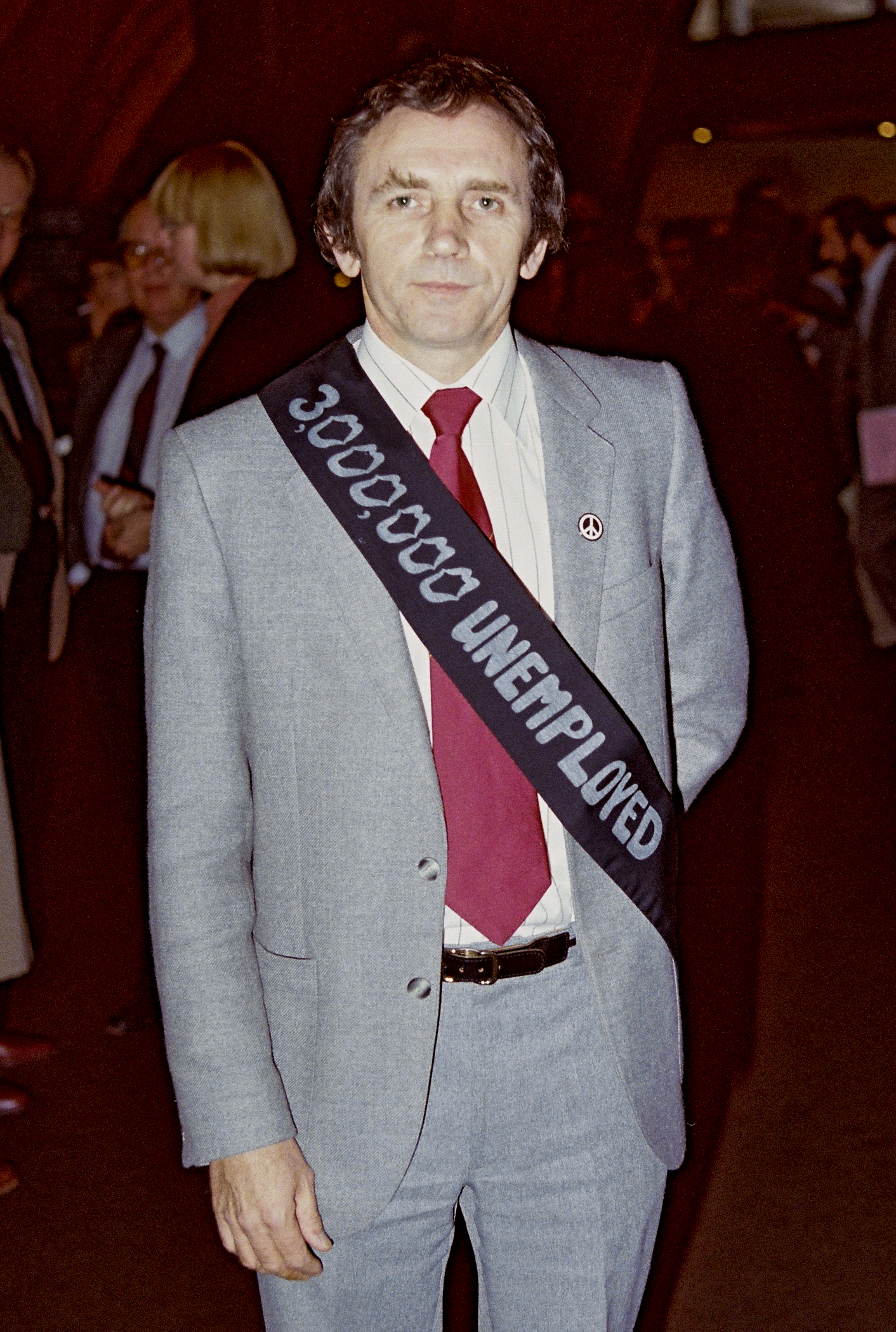
- Rogers in 1983

Member of Parliament for Rhondda
- In office 9 June 1983 – 7 June 2001
- Preceded by: Alec Jones
- Succeeded by: Chris Bryant

Member of the European Parliament for South East Wales
- In office 10 June 1979 – 14 June 1984
- Preceded by: Constituency created
- Succeeded by: Constituency reorganised as South Wales East

Councillor, Gelligaer District Council
- Incumbent
- Assumed office 1965

Councillor, Glamorgan County Council
- In office 1970–1974

Councillor, Mid Glamorgan County Council
- Incumbent
- Assumed office 1974

Personal details
- Born: Allan Ralph Rogers; 24 October 1932 Gelligaer, Caerphilly, Wales
- Died: 28 November 2023 (aged 91)
- Party: Labour
- Spouse: Ceridwen James (m. 1955; died 2022)
- Children: 4
- Education: Swansea University
- Profession: Geologist, Teacher
- Committees: Welsh Affairs Committee; Public Accounts Committee; European Scrutiny Committee; Commons Intelligence and Security Committee
- Portfolio: Opposition Defence Spokesman; Opposition Foreign Affairs Spokesman

Allan Ralph Rogers (24 October 1932 – 28 November 2023) was a British Labour Party politician who served as Member of the European Parliament (MEP) for South East Wales from 1979 to 1984, and Member of Parliament (MP) for Rhondda from 1983 to 2001.

Born into a working-class family in Gelligaer as the youngest of twelve children, Rogers trained as a geologist before transitioning to education and politics. Despite serving as Vice-President of the European Parliament from 1979 to 1982, he became increasingly Eurosceptic and called for British withdrawal from the European Economic Community in 1982.

As MP for Rhondda, he played a prominent role during the 1984–1985 United Kingdom miners' strike, supporting the striking miners whilst refusing to align with Arthur Scargill's leadership. Rogers served on the Public Accounts Committee and as opposition defence spokesman, becoming known for his forthright criticism of financial mismanagement and his famous observation that thieves stealing from the DHSS faced jail whilst City fraudsters escaped to the Cayman Islands.

A consistent opponent of Welsh devolution, Rogers campaigned against both the 1979 and 1997 Welsh devolution referendums, viewing devolution as a "hysterical response to nationalism". His opposition was widely blamed when Labour lost the Rhondda seat to Plaid Cymru in the first National Assembly for Wales elections in 1999. Increasingly disillusioned with New Labour under Tony Blair, Rogers was one of 33 MPs who rebelled against student tuition fees and announced his retirement in 1998, citing frustration with a government that was insufficiently "proactive in helping those we represent".

== Background ==
Allan Ralph Rogers was born on 24 October 1932 in Gelligaer, the youngest of twelve children in a working class family. His father was John Rogers and his mother was the former Madeleine Smith. Growing up in one of Wales's mining communities during the Great Depression and Second World War, Rogers was exposed from an early age to the economic struggles that would later shape his political outlook.

Rogers attended Bargoed Secondary School and showed academic promise. He won a scholarship to Selwyn College, Cambridge, but was unable to take up this opportunity when his national service deferment papers were mysteriously 'mislaid'. This setback would prove formative, as it redirected his educational path and delayed his entry into higher education.

Rogers performed his national service from 1951 to 1953 with the Royal Welch Fusiliers. Following his military service, he pursued his academic interests by studying geology at University College Swansea (now Swansea University). This scientific background would later influence both his analytical approach to politics and his post-parliamentary career.

After completing his degree, Rogers embarked on a successful career as a geologist that took him across the globe. He worked for seven years in the geological field, gaining experience in the United Kingdom, United States, Canada, and Australia. This international experience broadened his perspective and gave him firsthand knowledge of different economic and political systems, experience he would later draw upon in his political career.

After his geological career, Rogers transitioned into education, initially working at secondary school level before moving into adult education. In 1965, he became a tutor-organiser with the Workers' Educational Association (WEA), where he worked alongside Neil Kinnock, who would later become Leader of the Labour Party. Their collaboration at the WEA marked the beginning of a long political friendship and shared commitment to educational opportunity for working people.

Rogers and Kinnock introduced adult education classes for workers at Switchgear, demonstrating Rogers' belief in making education accessible to working-class communities. Rogers also pioneered art classes in mental health facilities, showing an innovative approach to education and a concern for vulnerable groups. Even during his parliamentary career, Rogers maintained his connection to education, teaching part-time at the University of Glamorgan.

Rogers joined the Labour Party at the age of 16, indicating an early political engagement rooted in his working-class background and family circumstances. His transition from geology to education, and then to politics, reflected a progression from technical expertise through social engagement to public service. His diverse professional background-combining scientific training, international experience, and educational work-would later inform his approach to political issues ranging from economic policy to social welfare.

== Politics ==
=== Local government ===
Rogers began his political career in local government, winning election to Gelligaer District Council in 1965. He progressed to Glamorgan County Council in 1970, serving as chairman of its education committee. When local government was reorganised in 1974, he continued his service on Mid Glamorgan County Council, representing the Hengoed ward.

=== European Parliament (1979–1984) ===
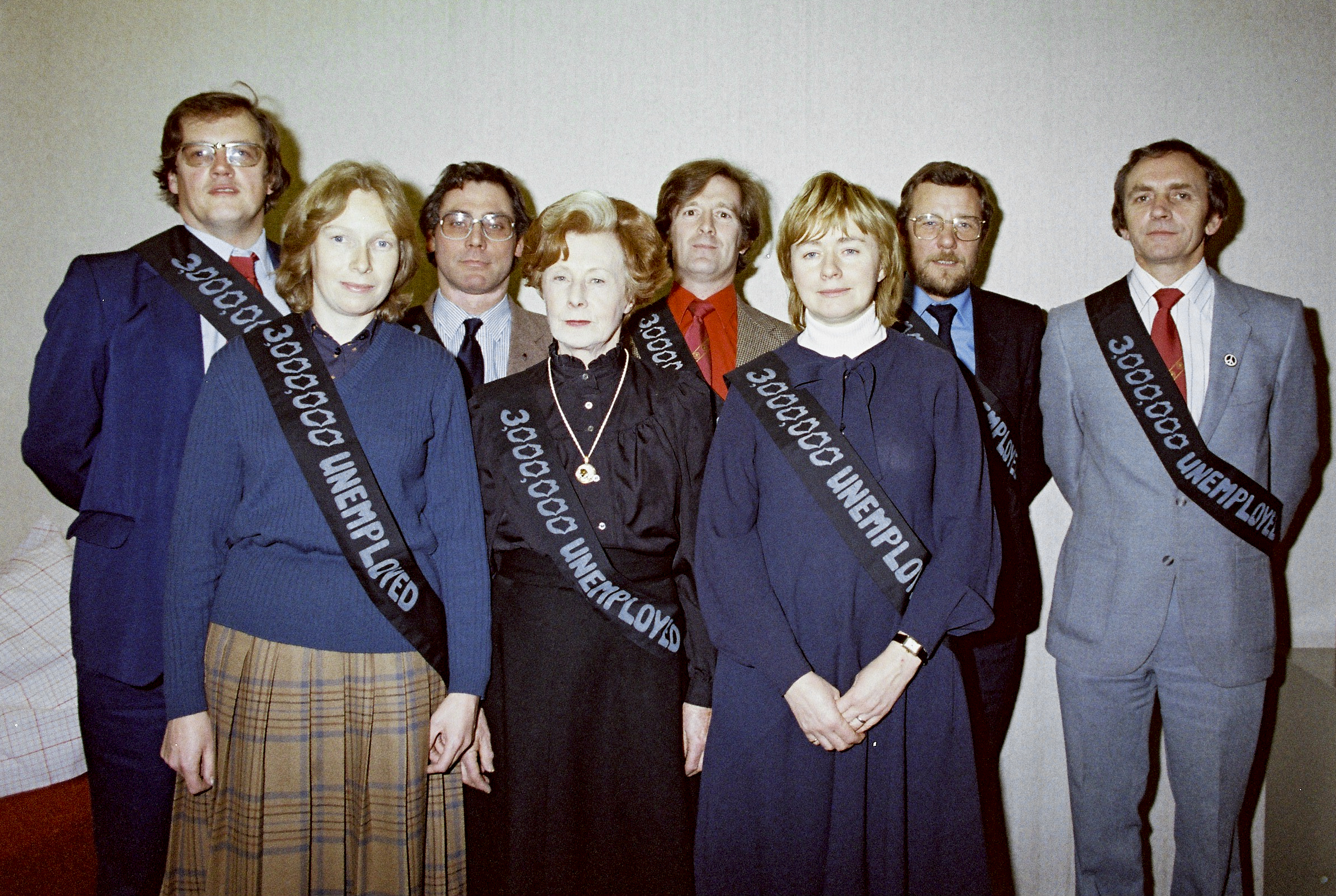
Rogers (far right) with fellow Labour MEPs including Barbara Castle and Ann Clwyd protesting unemployment, 1982.

In 1979, Rogers was elected Member of the European Parliament for South East Wales with a majority of 41,615 over the Conservative candidate. Despite his later Euroscepticism, he served as one of the Vice-Presidents of the European Parliament from July 1979 to January 1982. The Labour group elected Barbara Castle as their leader and Rogers as whip, though he ridiculed the assembly's "pomposity and long-windedness".

During his time as an MEP, Rogers was an early critic of what would later become major European issues. He campaigned against "transfer pricing", where multinationals claimed to conduct business in member states with the lowest taxes—an issue that would become significant decades later. He also attempted to secure a register of MEPs' financial interests. By April 1982, Rogers had become sufficiently disillusioned to call for British withdrawal from the European Economic Community.

=== Member of Parliament (1983–2001) ===
Rogers was selected for the Rhondda constituency in March 1983 and won the seat in the 1983 general election with a majority of 21,370 over the SDP candidate. He retained his European Parliament seat until the 1984 European elections.

==== The miners' strike ====
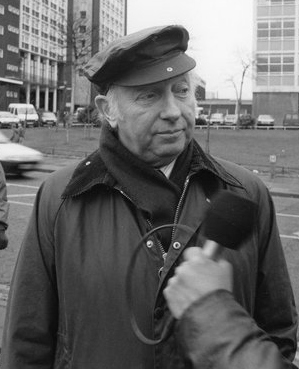
Rogers was supportive of the miners, but publicly opposed Arthur Scargill's tactics during the strikes

Rogers' parliamentary career began during one of the most contentious periods in modern British industrial relations. During the 1984–1985 United Kingdom miners' strike, Rogers supported the striking miners whilst maintaining a complex relationship with the dispute's leadership. Although he backed the strike, Rogers refused to share a platform with Arthur Scargill, the National Union of Mineworkers leader.

Despite his reservations about Scargill's leadership, Rogers and his family actively supported the striking miners. He spent time on picket lines, lent his car to picketers, and alongside fellow MP Joe Ashton, gave up part of their parliamentary salaries to miners' support groups. The strike highlighted divisions within his constituency, with one local miners' organisation controlled by the Communist Party resenting his involvement.

==== Committee work and opposition roles ====
Rogers served on several key parliamentary committees, including the Welsh Affairs Committee, European Scrutiny Committee, and most notably the Public Accounts Committee from 1985 to 1988. On the Public Accounts Committee, he became known for his forthright criticism of financial mismanagement and fraud. His most famous observation was: "Steal £20 from the DHSS and you land up in jail; steal £20 million in the City and you land up in the Cayman Islands." He also highlighted what he termed financial mismanagement "verging on a scandal" at the National Museum of Wales.

Rogers' electoral support peaked in the 1987 election, when his majority reached 30,754. Following this victory, he joined Denzil Davies's front-bench defence team as opposition defence spokesman. In this role, he highlighted problems with pilot retention in the Royal Air Force, complained that Britain was building only one frigate per year instead of the required three, and accused ministers of "shiftiness and hypocrisy" over alleged bribery in the sale of Panavia Tornado fighter-bombers to Saudi Arabia. In June 1989, he criticised Margaret Thatcher's reluctance to include Trident in nuclear disarmament talks with Soviet leaders.

After John Smith's death in May 1994, Tony Blair dropped Rogers from the front bench. In December 1994, Rogers joined the newly formed Intelligence and Security Committee.

==== Opposition to Welsh devolution ====
Rogers was a prominent opponent of Welsh devolution throughout his career. Having opposed the failed 1979 Welsh devolution referendum, he maintained his opposition during the 1997 Welsh devolution referendum. He viewed devolution as a "hysterical response to nationalism" and believed an additional tier of government would weaken Wales's local councils. When Labour lost the Rhondda to Plaid Cymru in the first National Assembly for Wales elections in May 1999, Rogers' opposition to devolution was widely blamed for the defeat.

==== Later parliamentary career ====
Rogers became increasingly disenchanted with New Labour under Blair's leadership. As early as May 1996, he commented: "At times I think the Tories are more interventionist." He was one of 33 Labour MPs who rebelled against the introduction of student tuition fees. By 1998, disillusioned with a government he felt should be "more proactive in helping those we represent", Rogers announced he would not seek re-election.

Rogers stepped down at the 2001 United Kingdom general election, ending an 18-year parliamentary career. He was succeeded by Chris Bryant, who would later become a senior Labour figure and receive a knighthood.

The Guardian reported that during the 1997 election, Rogers was offered a peerage in exchange for standing aside to allow a younger candidate to take his safe seat, similar to the arrangement offered to fellow Welsh Labour MP Ray Powell. Rogers allegedly rejected this offer.

== Personal life and death ==
=== Family ===
Rogers married Ceridwen James in 1955. Their marriage lasted 67 years until her death in 2022. They had four children, including daughter Dr Cerilan Rogers, who sought the Labour nomination for Cynon Valley in 1984. Wayne David, MP for Caerphilly, who visited Rogers in his later years, described him as "a man of huge warmth, integrity and principle". Ceridwen's death in 2022 was particularly difficult for Rogers in his final years.

=== Personal interests and character ===
Rogers was a jazz enthusiast and keen gardener. Politically, he was known for his forthright manner. Former Labour colleague Brian Sedgemore noted that he had "the stance of a boxer", whilst Private Eye dubbed him leader of Labour's "yob tendency" due to his blunt speaking style and sharp humour.

=== Post-parliamentary career ===
After retiring from Parliament in 2001, Rogers returned to geological work with the British Geological Survey and the Geological Society. He became Chair of the Earth Science Education Forum, combining his geological expertise with his commitment to education. This work continued themes from his earlier career, including his introduction of adult education classes alongside Neil Kinnock.

=== Death and tributes ===
Rogers died on 28 November 2023, aged 91.

Chris Evans MP for Islwyn said: "Allan was the first MP I ever met growing up in the Rhondda. Later he became a friend, always encouraging and on hand to give advice when I became an MP." His successor Sir Chris Bryant called him "a magnificent advocate for the people of the Rhondda through some of its darkest times". Rogers had served during the pit closures and economic decline of the 1980s and 1990s.

== Sources ==
- Leigh Rayment's Historical List of MPs – Constituencies beginning with "R" (part 1)

European Parliament
New constituency	Member of the European Parliament for South East Wales; 1979 – 1984	constituency abolished see South Wales East
Parliament of the United Kingdom
Preceded by Alec Jones	Member of Parliament for Rhondda; 1983 – 2001	Succeeded by Chris Bryant
