= South East Wales (European Parliament constituency) =

Former European Parliament constituency

- European Parliament constituency
- Boundary within Wales (1979-1984)
- Member state: United Kingdom
- Created: 1979
- Dissolved: 1984
- MEPs: 1

South East Wales was a European Parliament constituency covering south eastern Wales, including Gwent and parts of Mid Glamorgan.

Prior to its uniform adoption of proportional representation in 1999, the United Kingdom used first-past-the-post for the European elections in England, Scotland and Wales. The European Parliament constituencies used under that system were smaller than the later regional constituencies and only had one Member of the European Parliament each.

The constituency consisted of the Westminster Parliament constituencies of Aberdare, Abertillery, Bedwellty, Caerphilly, Ebbw Vale, Merthyr Tydfil, Monmouth, Newport, Pontypool, Rhondda.

The constituency was replaced by most of the similarly named South Wales East in 1984. This became part of the much larger Wales constituency in 1999.

== Members of the European Parliament ==
Elected	Name	Party
1979	Allan Rogers	Labour
1984	Constituency abolished: see South Wales East	

== Results ==
European Parliament election, 1979: South East Wales
Party	Candidate	Votes	%	±%
Labour	Allan Rogers	93,093	54.8	
Conservative	Mrs. Ann Robinson	51,478	30.3	
Plaid Cymru	M. G. Jones	12,469	7.4	
Liberal	A. T. Pope	10,534	6.2	
Independent	B. Kelly	2,182	1.3	
Majority		41,615	24.5	
Turnout		169,756	31.1	
Labour win (new seat)				
