= United Kingdom general election results in South Central Wales =

South Central Wales

These are the election results from United Kingdom general elections based on the electoral regional boundaries used by the Senedd (Welsh Parliament), for the Senedd electoral region of South Wales Central. Since the 1997 general election, this grouping of constituencies into this unofficial region have elected eight Members of Parliament to the House of Commons of the United Kingdom.

== Regional profile ==
The region is based around the Cardiff built-up Area. The boundaries are based on the Senedd electoral region South Wales Central. Regions are not used in UK general elections.

== 2001 ==
South Central Wales elected eight Members of Parliament.

Constituency	Candidates					Incumbent
Constituency	Labour	Conservative	Liberal Democrat	Plaid Cymru	Other	Incumbent
Cardiff Central	Jon Owen Jones 13,451 (38.6%)	Gregory Walker 5,537 (15.9%)	Jenny Willott 12,792 (36.7%)	Richard Rhys Grigg 1,680 (4.8%)	Stephen Bartley (Green) 661 (1.9%) Julian Goss (Socialist Alliance) 283 (0.8%) Frank Hughes (UKIP) 221 (0.6%) Madeleine Jeremy (ProLife Alliance) 217 (0.6%)	Jon Owen Jones
Cardiff North	Julie Morgan 19,845 (45.9%)	Alastair Watson 13,680 (31.6%)	John Dixon 6,631 (15.3%)	Sion Jobbins 2,471 (2.5%)	Don Hulston (UKIP) 613 (1.4%)	Julie Morgan
Cardiff South and Penarth	Alun Michael 20,094 (56.2%)	Maureen Owen 7,807 (21.8%)	Rodney Berman 4,572 (12.8%)	Lila Haines 1,983 (5.5%)	Justin Callan (UKIP) 501 (1.4%) David Bartlett (Socialist Alliance) 427 (1.2%) Anne Savoury (ProLife Alliance) 367 (1.0%)	Alun Michael
Cardiff West	Kevin Brennan 18,594 (54.6%)	Andrew Davies 7,273 (21.3%)	Jacqui Gasson 4,458 (13.1%)	Delme Bowen 3,296 (9.7%)	Joyce Jenking (UKIP) 462 (1.4%)	Rhodri Morgan†
Cynon Valley	Ann Clwyd 17,685 (65.6%)	Julian Waters 2,045 (7.6%)	Ian Parry 2,541 (9.4%)	Steven J. Cornelius 4,687 (17.4%)		Ann Clwyd
Pontypridd	Kim Howells 22,963 (59.9%)	Prudence Dailey 5,096 (13.3%)	Eric Brooke 4,152 (10.8%)	Bleddyn Hancock 5,279 (13.8%)	Susan Warry (UKIP) 380 (1.6%) Joseph Biddulph (ProLife Alliance) 216 (0.6%)	Kim Howells
Rhondda	Chris Bryant 23,230 (68.3%)	Peter Hobbins 1,557 (4.6%)	Gavin Cox 1,525 (4.5%)	Leanne Wood 7,183 (21.1%)	Glyndwr Summers (Ind.) 507 (1.5%)	Allan Rogers†
Vale of Glamorgan	John Smith 20,524 (45.4%)	Susan Inkin 15,824 (35.0%)	Dewi Smith 5,521 (12.2%)	Chris Franks 2,867 (6.3%)	Timothy Warry (UKIP) 448 (1.0%)	John Smith

== 1997 ==
South Central Wales elected eight Members of Parliament.

Constituency	Candidates						Incumbent
Constituency	Labour	Conservative	Liberal Democrat	Plaid Cymru	Referendum	Other	Incumbent
Cardiff Central	Jon Owen Jones 18,464 (43.7%)	David Melding 8,470 (20.0%)	Jenny Randerson 10,541 (24.9%)	Wayne Vernon 1,504 (3.6%)	Nick Lloyd 760 (1.8%)	Terence Burns (SLP) 2,230 (5.3%) Craig James (OMRLP) 204 (0.5%) Anthony Hobbs (NLP) 80 (0.2%)	Jon Owen Jones
Cardiff North	Julie Morgan 24,460 (50.4%)	Gwilym Jones 16,334 (33.7%)	Robyn Rowland 5,294 (10.9%)	Colin Palfrey 1,201 (2.5%)	Edward J. Litchfield 1,199 (2.5%)		Gwilym Jones
Cardiff South and Penarth	Alun Michael 22,647 (53.4%)	Caroline E. Roberts 8,786 (20.7%)	Simon J. Wakefield 3,964 (9.3%)	David B. L. Haswell 1,356 (3.2%)	Phillip S. E. Morgan 1,211 (2.9%)	John Foreman (New Labour) 3,942 (9.3%) Mike K. Shepherd (Socialist Alternative) 344 (0.8%) Barbara Caves (NLP) 170 (0.4%)	Alun Michael
Cardiff West	Rhodri Morgan 24,297 (60.3%)	Simon Hoare 8,669 (21.5%)	Jacqui Gasson 4,366 (10.8%)	Gwenllian Carr 1,949 (4.8%)	Trefor Johns 996 (2.5%)		Rhodri Morgan
Cynon Valley	Ann Clwyd 23,307 (69.7%)	Andrew Smith 2,260 (6.8%)	Huw Price 3,459 (10.3%)	Alun Davies 3,552 (10.6%)	Gwyn John 844 (2.5%)		Ann Clwyd
Pontypridd	Kim Howells 29,290 (63.9%)	Jonathan M. Cowen 5,910 (12.9%)	Nigel Howells 6,161 (13.4%)	Owain Llewelyn 2,977 (6.5%)	John Wood 874 (1.9%)	Peter Skelly (SLP) 380 (0.8%) Robert Griffiths (Communist) 178 (0.4%) Anthony G. Moore (NLP) 85 (0.2%)	Kim Howells
Rhondda	Allan Rogers 30,381 (74.5%)	Steven Whiting 1,551 (3.8%)	Rodney Berman 2,307 (5.7%)	Leanne Wood 5,450 (13.4%)	Stephen Gardiner 658 (1.6%)	Kevin Jakeway (Green) 460 (1.1%)	Allan Rogers
Vale of Glamorgan	John Smith 29,054 (53.9%)	Walter Sweeney 18,522 (34.4%)	Suzanne Campbell 4,945 (9.2%)	Melanie Corp 1,393 (2.6%)			Walter Sweeney
