= United Kingdom general election results in South East Wales =

South East Wales

These are the election results from United Kingdom general elections based on the electoral regional boundaries used by the Senedd (Welsh Parliament), for the Senedd electoral region of South Wales East. Since the 1997 general election, this grouping of constituencies into this unofficial region have elected eight Members of Parliament to the House of Commons of the United Kingdom.

== Regional profile ==
The region is based around the Newport metropolitan area. The boundaries are based on the Senedd electoral region South Wales East. Regions are not used in UK general elections.

== 2001 ==
South East Wales elected eight Members of Parliament.

Constituency	Candidates					Incumbent
Constituency	Labour	Conservative	Liberal Democrat	Plaid Cymru	Other	Incumbent
Blaenau Gwent	Llew Smith 22,855 (72.0%)	Huw Williams 2,383 (7.5%)	Edward Townsend 2,945 (9.3%)	Adam Rykala 3,542 (11.2%)		Llew Smith
Caerphilly	Wayne David 22,597 (58.5%)	David Simmonds 4,413 (11.4%)	Rob Roffe 3,469 (9.0%)	Lindsay Whittle 8,172 (21.1%)		Ron Davies†
Islwyn	Don Touhig 19,505 (61.5%)	Phillip Howells 2,543 (8.0%)	Kevin Etheridge 4,196 (13.2%)	Leigh Thomas 3,767 (11.9%)	Paul Taylor (Ind.) 1,263 (4.0%) Mary Millington (SLP) 417 (1.2%)	Don Touhig
Merthyr Tydfil and Rhymney	Dai Havard 19,574 (61.8%)	Richard Cuming 2,272 (7.2%)	Keith Rogers 2,385 (7.5%)	Robert Hughes 4,651 (14.7%)	Jeffrey Edwards (Ind.) 1,936 (6.1%) Ken Evans (SLP) 692 (2.2%) Anthony Lewis (PLA) 174 (0.5%)	Ted Rowlands†
Monmouth	Huw Edwards 19,021 (42.8%)	Roger Evans 18,637 (41.9%)	Neil Parker 5,080 (11.4%)	Marc Hubbard 1,068 (2.4%)	David Rowlands (UKIP) 656 (1.5%)	Huw Edwards
Newport East	Alan Howarth 17,120 (54.7%)	Ian Oakley 7,246 (23.2%)	Alistair Cameron 4,394 (14.0%)	Madoc Batcup 1,519 (4.9%)	Elizabeth Screen (SLP) 420 (1.3%) Neal Reynolds (UKIP) 410 (1.3%) Robert Griffiths (Communist) 173 (0.6%)	Alan Howarth
Newport West	Paul Flynn 18,489 (52.7%)	William Morgan 9,185 (26.2%)	Veronica Watkins 4,095 (11.7%)	Anthony Salkeld 2,510 (7.2%)	Hugh Hughes (UKIP) 506 (1.4%) Terrance Cavill (BNP) 278 (0.8%)	Paul Flynn
Torfaen	Paul Murphy 21,883 (62.1%)	Jason Evans 5,603 (15.9%)	Alan Masters 3,936 (11.2%)	Stephen Smith 2,720 (7.7%)	Brenda Vipass (UKIP) 657 (1.9%) Stephen Bell (Socialist Alliance) 443 (1.3%)	Paul Murphy

== 1997 ==
South East Wales elected eight Members of Parliament.

Constituency	Candidates						Incumbent
Constituency	Labour	Conservative	Liberal Democrat	Plaid Cymru	Referendum	Other	Incumbent
Blaenau Gwent	Llew Smith 31,493 (79.5%)	Margrit A. Williams 2,607 (6.6%)	Geraldine Layton 3,458 (8.7%)	Jim B. Criddle 2,072 (5.2%)			Llew Smith
Caerphilly	Ron Davies 30,697 (67.3%)	Rhodri Harris 4,858 (10.7%)	Tony D. Ferguson 3,724 (8.2%)	Lindsay Whittle 4,383 (9.7%)	Mark E. Morgan 1,337 (3.0%)	Catherine Williams (PLA) 270 (0.6%)	Ron Davies
Islwyn	Don Touhig 26,995 (74.2%)	David Walters 2,864 (7.9%)	Christopher Worker 3,064 (8.4%)	Darren Jones 2,272 (6.2%)	Susan Monaghan 1,209 (3.3%)		Don Touhig
Merthyr Tydfil and Rhymney	Ted Rowlands 30,012 (76.7%)	Jonathan Morgan 2,508 (6.4%)	Duncan Anstey 2,926 (7.5%)	Alun Cox 2,344 (6.0%)	Ronald Hutchings 660 (1.7%)	Alan Cowdell (Ind. Lab.) 691 (1.8%)	Ted Rowlands
Monmouth	Huw Edwards 23,404 (47.7%)	Roger Evans 19,226 (39.2%)	Mark Williams 4,689 (9.6%)	Alan Cotton 516 (1.1%)	Timothy Warry 1,190 (2.4%)		Roger Evans
Newport East	Alan Howarth 21,481 (57.7%)	David Evans 7,958 (21.4%)	Alistair Cameron 3,880 (10.4%)	Christopher Holland 721 (1.9%)	Edward Chaney-Davis 1,267 (3.4%)	Arthur Scargill (SLP) 1,951 (5.2%)	Roy Hughes†
Newport West	Paul Flynn 24,331 (60.5%)	Peter Clarke 9,794 (24.4%)	Stanley Wilson 3,907 (9.7%)	Huw Jackson 648 (1.6%)	Andrew Thompsett 1,199 (3.0%)	Hugh Hughes (UKIP) 323 (0.3%)	Paul Flynn
Torfaen	Paul Murphy 29,863 (69.1%)	Neil Parish 5,327 (12.3%)	Jean Gray 5,249 (12.1%)	Robert Gough 1,042 (2.4%)	Deborah Holler 1,245 (2.9%)	Roger Coghill (Green) 519 (1.2%)	Paul Murphy
