= United Kingdom general election results in South West Wales =

South West Wales

These are the election results from United Kingdom general elections based on the electoral regional boundaries used by the Senedd (Welsh Parliament), for the Senedd electoral region of South Wales West. Since the 1997 general election, this grouping of constituencies into this unofficial region have elected seven Members of Parliament to the House of Commons of the United Kingdom.

== Regional profile ==
The region is based around Swansea. The boundaries are based on the Senedd electoral region South Wales West. Regions are not used in UK general elections.

== 2001 ==
South West Wales elected 7 Members of Parliament.

Constituency	Candidates					Incumbent
Constituency	Labour	Conservative	Liberal Democrat	Plaid Cymru	Other	Incumbent
Aberavon	Hywel Francis 19,063 (63.1%)	Ali Miraj 2,296 (7.6%)	Christopher Davies 2,933 (9.7%)	Lisa Turnbull 2,955 (9.8%)	Andrew Tutton (Independent) 1,960 (6.5%) Captain Beany (New Millennium Bean) 727 (2.4%) Martin Chapman (Socialist Alliance) 256 (0.8%)	John Morris†
Bridgend	Win Griffiths 19,423 (52.5%)	Tania Brisby 9,377 (25.3%)	Jean Barraclough 5,330 (14.4%)	Monica Mahoney 2,653 (7.2%)	Sara Jeremy (ProLife Alliance) 223 (0.6%)	Win Griffiths
Gower	Martin Caton 17,676 (47.3%)	John Bushell 10,281 (27.5%)	Sheila Waye 4,507 (12.1%)	Siân Caiach 3,865 (10.3%)	Tina Shrewsbury (Green) 607 (1.6%) Darran Hickery (SLP) 417 (1.1%)	Martin Caton
Neath	Peter Hain 21,253 (60.7%)	David Devine 3,310 (9.5%	Dai Davies 3,335 (9.5%)	Alun Llewelyn 6,437 (18.4%)	Huw Pudner (Socialist Alliance) 483 (1.4%) Gerry Brienza (ProLife Alliance) 202 (0.6%)	Peter Hain
Ogmore	Ray Powell 18,833 (62.0%)	Richard Hill 3,383 (11.1%)	Ian Lewis 3,878 (12.8%)	Angela Pulman 4,259 (14.0%)		Ray Powell
Swansea East	Donald Anderson 19,612 (65.2%)	Paul Morris 3,026 (10.1%)	Robert Speht 3,064 (10.2%)	John Ball 3,464 (11.5%)	Tony Young (Green) 463 (1.5%) Tim Jenkins (UKIP) 443 (1.5%)	Donald Anderson
Swansea West	Alan Williams 15,644 (48.7%)	Margaret Harper 6,094 (19.0%)	Mike Day 5,313 (16.6%)	Ian Titherington 3,404 (10.6%)	Richard Lewis (UKIP) 653 (2.0%) Martyn Shrewsbury (Green) 626 (2.0%) Alec Thraves (Socialist Alliance) 366 (1.1%)	Alan Williams

== 1997 ==
South West Wales elected 7 Members of Parliament.

Constituency	Candidates						Incumbent
Constituency	Labour	Conservative	Liberal Democrat	Plaid Cymru	Referendum	Other	Incumbent
Aberavon	John Morris 25,650 (71.3%)	Peter Harper 2,835 (7.9%)	Ronald McConville 4,079 (11.3%)	Philip Cockwell 2,088 (5.8%)	Peter David 970 (2.7%)	Captain Beany (Independent) 341 (1.0%)	John Morris
Bridgend	Win Griffiths 25,115 (58.1%)	David Davies 9,867 (22.8%)	Andrew Mckinlay 4,968 (11.5%)	Dennis R. Watkins 1,649 (3.8%)	Tudor Greaves 1,662 (3.8%)		Win Griffiths
Gower	Martin Caton 23,313 (53.8%)	Alun Cairns 10,306 (23.8%)	Howard W. Evans 5,624 (13.0%)	D Elwyn Williams 2,226 (5.1%)	Richard D. Lewis 1,745 (4.0%)	Anthony G. Popham (Independent) 122 (0.3%)	Gareth Wardell†
Neath	Peter Hain 30,324 (73.5%)	David M. Evans 3,583 (8.7%)	Frank H. Little 2,597 (6.3%)	Trefor Jones 3,344 (8.1%)	Peter A. Morris 975 (2.4%)	Howard Marks (Legalise Cannabis Party) 420 (1.0%)	Peter Hain
Ogmore	Ray Powell 28,163 (74.0%)	David A. Unwin 3,716 (9.8%)	Kirsty Williams 3,510 (9.2%)	John D. Rogers 2,679 (7.0%)			Ray Powell
Swansea East	Donald Anderson 29,151 (75.4%)	Catherine Dibble 3,582 (9.3%)	Elwyn Jones 3,440 (8.9%)	Michelle Pooley 1,308 (2.3%)	Catherine Maggs 904 (2.3%)	Ronnie Job (Socialist Alternative) 289 (0.8%)	Donald Anderson
Swansea West	Alan Williams 22,748 (56.2%)	Andrew Baker 8,289 (20.5%)	John Newbury 5,872 (14.5%)	Dai Lloyd 2,675 (6.6%)		David Proctor (SLP) 885 (2.2%)	Alan Williams
