= South Wales East (European Parliament constituency) =

Former European Parliament constituency

- European Parliament constituency
- Boundary within Wales (1984-1994)
- Member state: United Kingdom
- Created: 1984
- Dissolved: 1999
- MEPs: 1

South Wales East was a European Parliament constituency covering southeastern Wales, including Gwent and parts of Mid Glamorgan.

Prior to its uniform adoption of proportional representation in 1999, the United Kingdom used the first-past-the-post system for the European Parliament elections in England, Scotland and Wales. The European Parliament constituencies used under that system were smaller than the later regional constituencies, and only had one Member of the European Parliament each.

South Wales East replaced the similarly named South East Wales in 1984, and became part of the much larger Wales constituency in 1999.

Boundary within Wales (1994-1999)

== Boundaries ==
1984-1994: Blaenau Gwent, Caerphilly, Cynon Valley, Islwyn, Merthyr Tydfil and Rhymney, Monmouth, Newport East, Newport West, Rhondda, Torfaen.

1994-1999: Blaenau Gwent, Caerphilly, Islwyn, Merthyr Tydfil and Rhymney, Monmouth, Newport East, Newport West, Torfaen.

== Members of the European Parliament ==
| Elected | Name | Party |
|---|---|---|
| 1984 | Llew Smith | Labour |
| 1994 | Glenys Kinnock | Labour |

== Results ==
European Parliament election, 1984: South East Wales
| Party | Candidate | Votes | % | ±% |
|---|---|---|---|---|
| Labour | Llew Smith | 131,916 | 61.2 | +6.4 |
| Conservative | Robert G. Whyatt | 36,359 | 16.9 | −13.4 |
| SDP | Clive D. Lindley | 28,330 | 13.2 | +7.0 |
| Plaid Cymru | Syd R. Morgan | 18,833 | 8.7 | +1.3 |
| Majority | | 95,557 | 44.3 | |
| Turnout | | 215,438 | 38.1 | |
| Labour hold | | Swing | | |

European Parliament election, 1989: South East Wales
| Party | Candidate | Votes | % | ±% |
|---|---|---|---|---|
| Labour | Llew Smith | 138,872 | 64.3 | +3.1 |
| Conservative | Rochfort J. Young | 30,384 | 14.1 | −2.8 |
| Green | Mel J. Witherden | 27,869 | 12.9 | New |
| Plaid Cymru | Miss J. Evans | 14,152 | 6.5 | −2.2 |
| SLD | Paul Nicholls-Jones | 4,661 | 2.2 | −10.0 |
| Majority | | 108,488 | 50.2 | +5.9 |
| Turnout | | 215,938 | 38.3 | +0.2 |
| Labour hold | | Swing | | |

European Parliament election, 1994: South Wales East
| Party | Candidate | Votes | % | ±% |
|---|---|---|---|---|
| Labour | Glenys Kinnock | 144,907 | 74.0 | |
| Conservative | Mrs. Rosamund Blomfield-Smith | 24,660 | 12.6 | |
| Liberal Democrats | Christopher F. Woolgrove | 9,963 | 5.1 | |
| Plaid Cymru | Colin P. Mann | 9,550 | 4.9 | |
| Green | Roger W. Coghill | 4,509 | 2.3 | |
| Welsh Socialist | Miss Sian Williams (Note: Sponsored by Cymru Goch) | 1,270 | 0.6 | |
| Natural Law | Dr. Ralph R. Brussatis | 1,027 | 0.5 | |
| Majority | | 120,247 | 61.4 | |
| Turnout | | 195,886 | 43.1 | |
| Labour win (new seat) | | | | |
