= Cymru Goch =

Welsh nationalist party (1986–2003)

Cymru Goch (Welsh for 'Red Wales', pronounced [ˈkəmrɨ ˈɡoːχ]) was a left-wing Welsh nationalist political party, founded in 1986 and fought for what it described as a Free Socialist Wales. It was absorbed into the Forward Wales Party in 2003.

== Background ==
Following the collapse of the Welsh Socialist Republican Movement, a number of former members, along with some who had previously been active in other parties including Plaid Cymru formed Cymru Goch. By the mid 1990s the party had over 300 members and 13 branches throughout Wales. It produced a journal, Y Faner Goch ('The Red Flag'), which had previously been published by the Welsh Socialist Republican Movement, a newsletter 'Y Fflam' (The Flame) and various booklets and pamphlets explaining its aims and discussing the relationship between Marxism and Welsh nationalism. It was one of the founders of the Welsh Socialist Alliance but left in 2002. In late 2003, it subsumed itself into the new Forward Wales party formed around John Marek AM in Wrexham.

== Campaigns and elections ==
In the Welsh local government elections in 1995, 3 Cymru Goch candidates were elected as councillors and the part stood a candidate in the elections to the European Parliament in 1994 in the South Wales East constituency against Glenys Kinnock. The party stood on an abstentionist platform and would have refused to take the seat if elected, seeing the European Parliament and the UK Parliament as foreign parliaments. It decided not to contest the 1997 general election.

Following the election of the Blair government in 1997, Cymru Goch joined with other organisations to campaign for the devolution proposals under the banner 'Socialists Say Yes".

During the 1980s and 1990s Cymru Goch was also heavily involved in campaigns against the Community Charge (the 'Poll Tax') and Welsh Water PLC.
