= Glenys Kinnock =

British peer and politician (1944–2023)

The Right Honourable The Baroness Kinnock of Holyhead PC FRSA
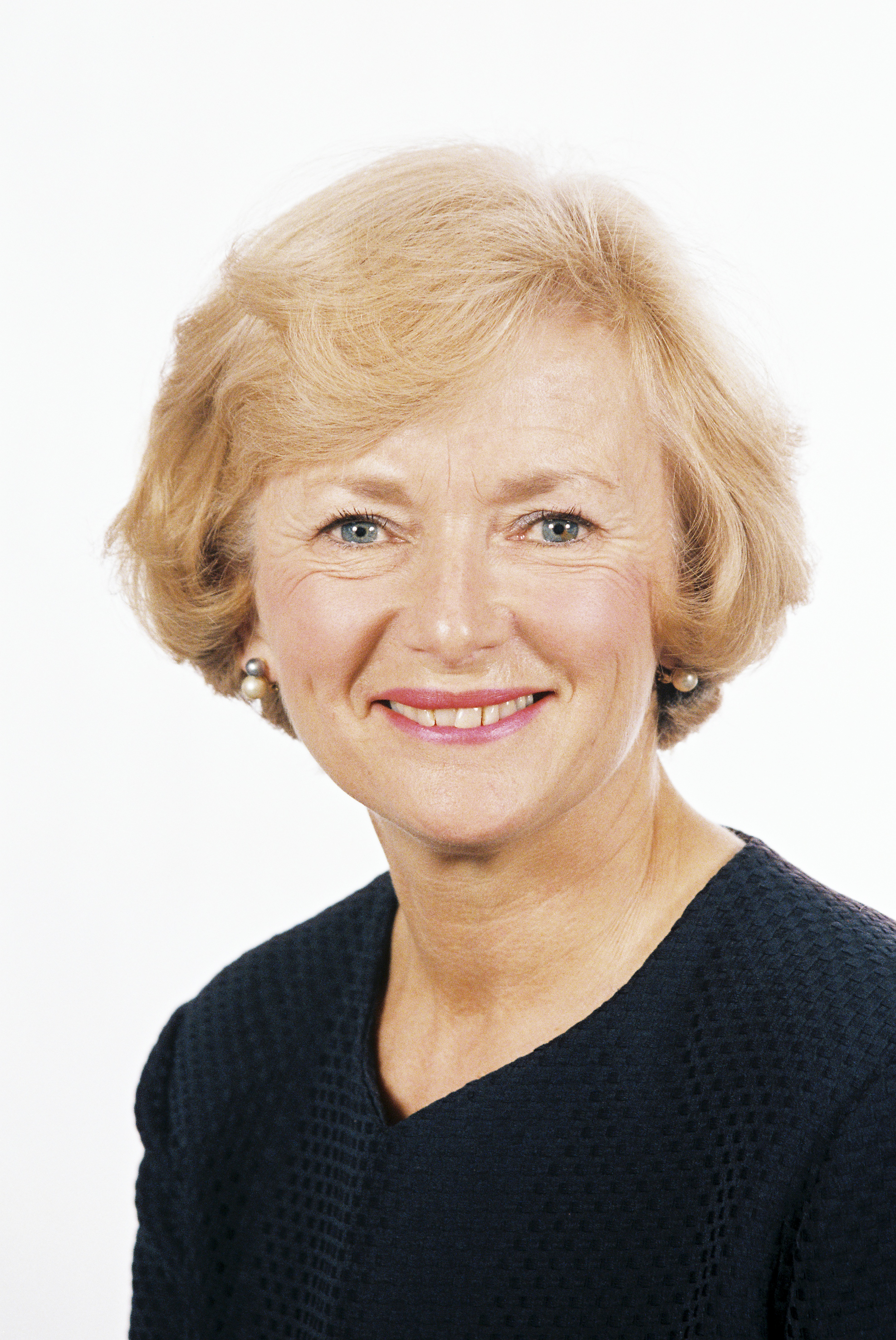
- Official portrait, 2003

Minister of State for Africa and the United Nations
- In office 13 October 2009 – 11 May 2010
- Prime Minister: Gordon Brown
- Preceded by: The Lord Malloch-Brown
- Succeeded by: Henry Bellingham

Minister of State for Europe
- In office 5 June 2009 – 13 October 2009
- Prime Minister: Gordon Brown
- Preceded by: Caroline Flint
- Succeeded by: Chris Bryant

Member of the House of Lords
- Lord Temporal
- Life peerage 30 June 2009 – 9 April 2021

Member of the European Parliament for Wales South Wales East (1994–1999)
- In office 19 July 1994 – 5 June 2009
- Preceded by: Llew Smith
- Succeeded by: Derek Vaughan

Personal details
- Born: Glenys Elizabeth Parry; 7 July 1944 Roade, Northamptonshire, England
- Died: 3 December 2023 (aged 79) London, England
- Party: Labour
- Spouse: Neil Kinnock (m. 1967)
- Children: 2, including Stephen
- Education: Cardiff University

Glenys Elizabeth Kinnock, Baroness Kinnock of Holyhead FRSA (née Parry; 7 July 1944 – 3 December 2023), was a British politician and teacher who served as Minister of State for Europe from June to October 2009 and Minister of State for Africa and the United Nations from 2009 to 2010. A member of the Labour Party, she was previously a member of the European Parliament (MEP) for Wales, formerly South Wales East, from 1994 to 2009.

== Early life ==
Glenys Elizabeth Parry was born in Roade, Northamptonshire, and educated at Holyhead Comprehensive School, Anglesey. She graduated in 1965 from University College, Cardiff in education and history. Parry worked at Moorland Primary School, in Splott, in 1966. She met Neil Kinnock at university and married him in 1967.

== European Parliament ==
Kinnock represented South Wales East in the European Parliament from 1994 until 1999, and Wales from 1999 until 2009, where she was a member of the Party of European Socialists (PES) political group. She was a Member of the European Parliament's Development and Co-operation Committee and a substitute member of the Committee on Citizens' Freedoms and Rights, Justice and Home Affairs. She was a co-president of the African, Caribbean and Pacific-EU Joint Parliamentary Assembly from 2002 to 2009, and Labour spokesperson on International Development in the European Parliament. In November 2006 Kinnock was criticised for "taking a junket" to Barbados to discuss world poverty issues. Kinnock co-presided over the 12th ACP-EU Joint Parliamentary Assembly.

== Domestic political career ==
In the 2009 cabinet reshuffle, Kinnock was appointed minister for Europe following the resignation of Caroline Flint. To enable her to join the government, she was awarded a life peerage and became Baroness Kinnock of Holyhead, of Holyhead in the County of Ynys Môn on 30 June 2009. She was introduced to the House of Lords on the same day.

In 2009, while she was minister for Europe, the status of the Welsh language was elevated to make it equal with several other European minority languages, such as Catalan. The cost of translation services was to be met by the Welsh Assembly and the Welsh Language Board. Kinnock commented "This demonstrates a clear commitment by the EU to promote its unique and diverse cultural heritage".

From 2009 to 2010, Kinnock served as minister of state for Africa and the United Nations, filling a post left vacant after the resignation of Lord Malloch-Brown. From 2010 to 2013 she was an Opposition spokesperson for the Department of International Development in the House of Lords. Kinnock retired from the Lords on 9 April 2021.

== Personal life ==
She was the wife of Neil Kinnock, who was leader of the Labour Party from 1983 to 1992, and they had two children together, Rachel and Stephen. When her husband was given a life peerage in 2005, she was entitled to the title Lady Kinnock, but decided against its use. However, she became Lady (or Baroness) Kinnock in her own right when she was ennobled in 2009. Kinnock grew up speaking Welsh.

=== Death ===
In 2017, Kinnock was diagnosed with Alzheimer's disease. Her husband spoke about their experience with the disease and providing support for her. She died from complications of the disease at her home in London, on 3 December 2023, aged 79.

== Publications ==
- Beyond Band Aid: Charity Is Not Enough (1987; with Joan Lestor and David Ward)
- Voices for One World (1987)
- Eritrea: Images of War and Peace (1988)
- Namibia: Women in War (1990; with Tessa Cleaver and Marion Wallace)
- Namibia: Birth of a Nation (1991; with Jenny Matthews)
- By Faith and Daring (1993; with Fiona Millar)
- The Gender Perspective (1995)
- Changing States: A Labour Agenda for Europe (1996; with Glyn Ford and Arlene McCarthy)
- A Woman's Work Is Never Done (2006; with Elizabeth Andrews and Ursula Masson)

=== Articles ===
- "The Rape of Darfur", 2006 (The Guardian)
- "A Lethal Bully That Must Be Tackled", 2006 (The Times)
- "Cambodia's Brazen U.N. Bid", 2012 (The New York Times)

European Parliament
Preceded by Llew Smith	Member of European Parliament for Wales; South Wales East (1994–1999); 1994–2009	Succeeded by Derek Vaughan
Political offices
Preceded by Caroline Flint	Minister of State for Europe; 2009	Succeeded by Chris Bryant as Under-Secretary of State for Europe and Asia
Preceded by The Lord Malloch-Brown as Minister of State for Africa, Asia and the United Nations	Minister of State for Africa and the United Nations; 2009–2010	Succeeded by Henry Bellingham as Under-Secretary of State for Africa and the United Nations
