= Welsh Socialist Alliance =

UK political party

The Welsh Socialist Alliance (WSA) was a socialist political organisation in Wales. It was closely related to, but separate from the Socialist Alliance.

It was founded by the Socialist Party and Cymru Goch and some independents. From the start this seemed to many an unlikely alliance given that the two principal groups involved have major disagreements over many issues, mainly over the national question. Cymru Goch called for an independent socialist republic whereas Socialist Party Wales at the time supported a Welsh parliament with law making powers short of independence. However they agreed to discuss the issue while the WSA called for the Welsh Assembly to have the same powers as the Scottish parliament. The WSA ensured that no one party could "control" it through the self-denying 40% ordinance which limited members of any organisation to no more than 40% of the Alliance committees.

The Welsh Socialist Alliance stood on a joint United Socialist ticket with the Socialist Workers Party at the Welsh Assembly election, 1999.

The Socialist Workers Party has originally declined to accept the invitation to join the WSA because the SWP was opposed in principle to standing in elections. In 2000 it changed its position and entered the WSA. The attempts by the SWP to dominate the WSA destabilised the organisation and by the end of 2002 both Cymru Goch and Socialist Party Wales had left.

The SWP ignored the 40% rule and packed meetings with members to ensure that its position prevailed and its supporters were selected as candidates. Cymru Goch left when any opportunity to argue for its pro-independence position was closed off and the Socialist Party left when the SWP packed a selection meeting in Swansea to ensure that no Socialist Party candidates would be selected for Swansea seats in the General Election. The Socialist Party's open letter of resignation blamed the SWP: "To lose one founding organisation could be unfortunate; to lose both can only mark the decline of the WSA as a genuine alliance".
