= List of political parties in the United Kingdom =

The Electoral Commission's Register of Political Parties lists the details of political parties registered to contest elections in the United Kingdom, including their registered name. Under current electoral law, including the Registration of Political Parties Act 1998, the Electoral Administration Act 2006, and the Political Parties, Elections and Referendums Act 2000, only registered party names can be used on ballot papers by those wishing to contest elections. Candidates who do not belong to a registered party can use "independent" or no label at all. As of 1 June 2026, the Electoral Commission showed the number of registered political parties in Great Britain and Northern Ireland as 410.

Before the middle of the 19th century, politics in the United Kingdom was dominated by the Whigs and the Tories. These were not political parties in the modern sense but somewhat loose alliances of interests and individuals. The Whigs included many of the leading aristocratic dynasties committed to the Protestant succession, and later drew support from elements of the emerging industrial interests and wealthy merchants, while the Tories were associated with the landed gentry, the Church of England and the Church of Scotland.

By the mid 19th century, the Tories had evolved into the Conservative Party, and the Whigs had evolved into the Liberal Party. The concept of right and left came originally from France, where the supporters of a monarchy (constitutional or absolute) sat on the right wing of the National Assembly, and republicans on the left. In the late 19th century, the Liberal Party began to lean towards the left. Liberal Unionists split off from the Liberals over Irish Home Rule and moved closer to the Conservatives over time.

The Liberals and Conservatives dominated the political scene until the 1920s, when the Liberal Party declined in popularity and suffered a long stream of resignations. It was replaced as the main anti-Tory opposition party by the newly emerging Labour Party, which represented an alliance between the labour movement, organised trades unions and various socialist societies.

Since then, the Conservative and Labour parties have dominated British politics, and have alternated in government ever since. However, the UK is not a two-party system as other parties have significant support. The Liberal Democrats were the third largest party until the 2015 general election when they were overtaken by the Scottish National Party in terms of seats and UK political party membership, and by the UK Independence Party (UKIP) in terms of votes. The Liberal Democrats regained the status of the third largest political party in the UK by seats with the outcome of the 2024 United Kingdom general election.

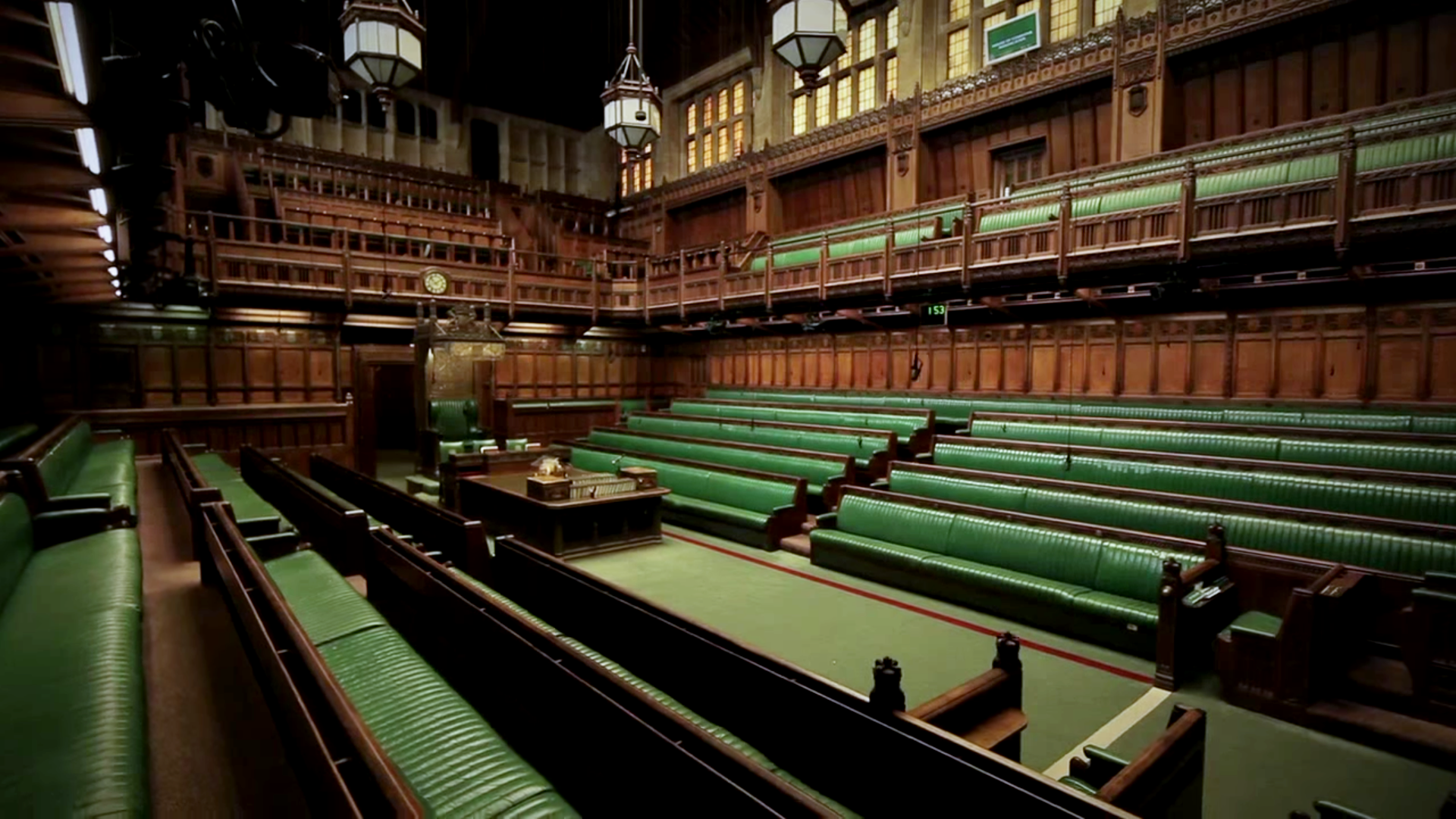
House of Commons chamber

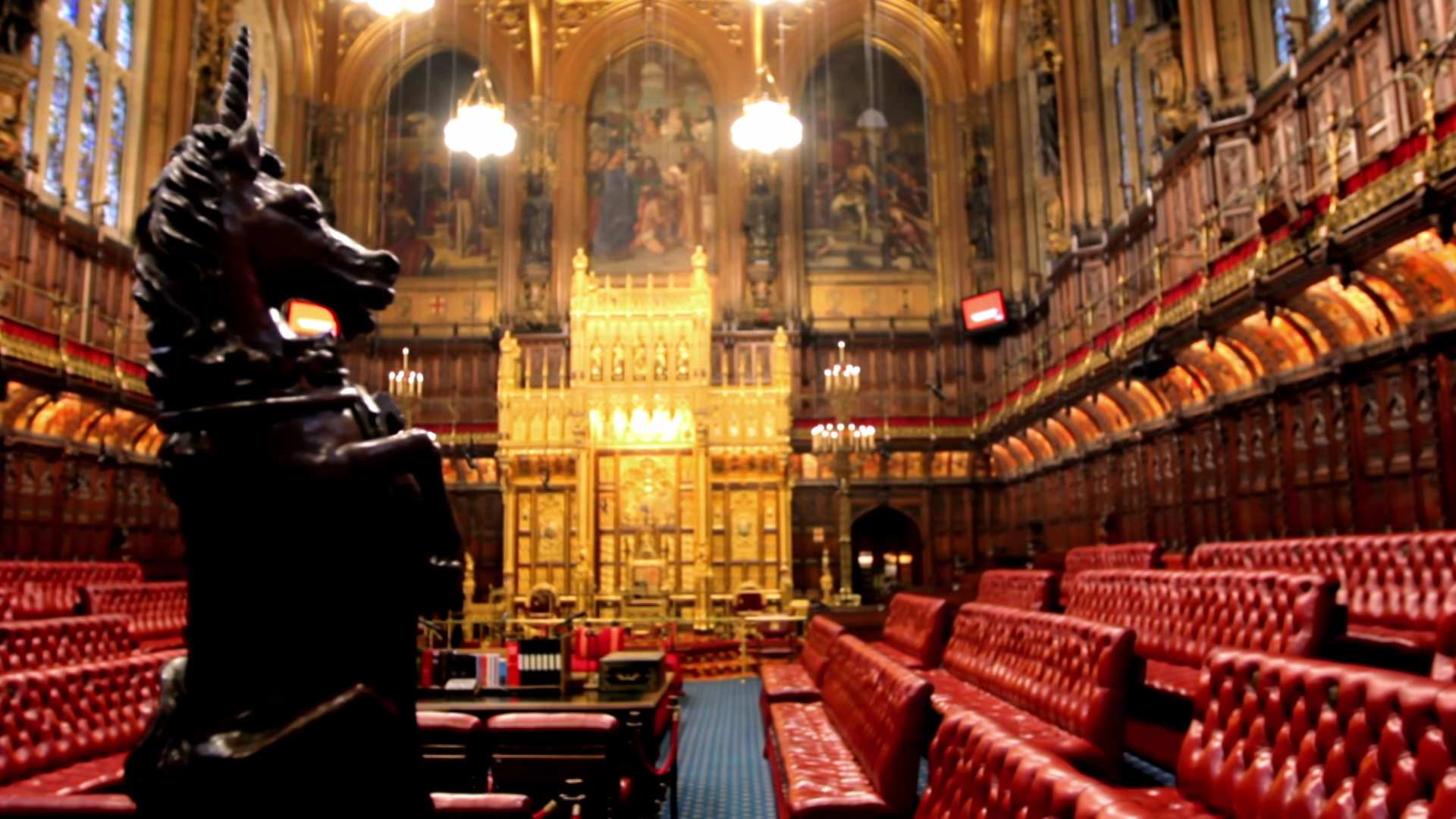
House of Lords chamber

The UK's first-past-the-post electoral system leaves small parties disadvantaged on a UK-wide scale. It can, however, allow parties with concentrations of supporters in the constituent countries to flourish. In the 2015 election, there was widespread controversy when the UK Independence Party (UKIP) and the Green Party of England and Wales collectively received 4.9 million votes (12.6% of the total vote for UKIP and 3.8% for the Greens) yet only gained one seat each in the House of Commons. After that election, UKIP, the Liberal Democrats, the Scottish National Party, Plaid Cymru, the Green Party of England and Wales, together with the Scottish Greens and the Green Party Northern Ireland, delivered a petition signed by 477,000 people to Downing Street demanding electoral reform.

Since 1997, proportional representation-based voting systems have been adopted for elections to the Scottish Parliament, the Senedd (Welsh Parliament), the Northern Ireland Assembly, the London Assembly and (until Brexit in 2020) the UK's seats in the European Parliament. In these bodies, other parties have had success.

Traditionally political parties have been private organisations with no official recognition by the state. The Registration of Political Parties Act 1998 changed that by creating a register of parties.

Membership of political parties has been in decline in the UK since the 1950s. Membership has fallen by over 65% since 1983, from 4% of the electorate to 1.3% in 2005.

== Parties with representation in the House of Commons ==
Party	Founded	Political position	Ideology	Leader	House of Commons	House of Lords	Scottish Parliament	Senedd	NI Assembly	London Assembly	Local government
Labour Party: Co-operative Party	1900; 1917 (Co-op)	Centre-left	Social democracy	Andy Burnham	403 / 650	209 / 826 (Note: Including 15 as Lab Co-op.)	17 / 129	9 / 96	—N/a (Note: Labour does not contest elections in Northern Ireland and endorses SDLP candidates.)	11 / 25 (Note: All 11 as Lab Co-op.)	4,581 / 19,103
Conservative and Unionist Party	1834 (As Conservative Party); 1912	Centre-right to right-wing	Conservatism; Economic liberalism British unionism	Kemi Badenoch	118 / 650	282 / 826 (Note: Including absent, suspended and temporarily disqualified members.)	12 / 129	7 / 96	0 / 90	7 / 25	3,861 / 19,103
Liberal Democrats	1988	Centre to centre-left	Liberalism; Social liberalism	Ed Davey	71 / 650	75 / 826	10 / 129	1 / 96	—N/a (Note: Liberal Democrats do not contest elections in Northern Ireland and endorses Alliance candidates.)	2 / 25	3,355 / 19,103
Scottish National Party (SNP)	1934	Centre-left	Scottish nationalism Scottish independence Social democracy	John Swinney	8 / 650	0 / 826	58 / 129	—N/a	—N/a	—N/a	413 / 19,103
Reform UK	2018	Right-wing to far-right	Right-wing populism Hard Euroscepticism	Nigel Farage	8 / 650	0 / 826	16 / 129	34 / 96	0 / 90	2 / 25	2,293 / 19,103
Sinn Féin	1970	Centre-left to left-wing	Irish republicanism Democratic socialism Left-wing nationalism	Michelle O'Neill (Note: Sinn Féin's president is Mary Lou McDonald, who is a TD for Dublin Central in Dáil Éireann, the lower house of the Oireachtas (legislature of the Republic of Ireland). O'Neill is the party's vice president and leads the party in Northern Ireland.)	7 / 650 (Note: Sinn Féin operate a policy of abstentionism and do not take their Commons seats)	0 / 826	—N/a	—N/a	27 / 90	—N/a	144 / 19,103
Green Party of England and Wales	1990	Left-wing	Green politics; Progressivism	Zack Polanski	5 / 650	2 / 826	—N/a	2 / 96	—N/a	3 / 25	1,300 / 19,103
Democratic Unionist Party (DUP)	1971	Right-wing	British unionism; British nationalism; Right-wing populism; Euroscepticism	Gavin Robinson	4 / 650	6 / 826	—N/a	—N/a	26 / 90	—N/a	119 / 19,103
Plaid Cymru	1925	Centre-left	Welsh nationalism Welsh independence Social democracy	Rhun ap Iorwerth	4 / 650	2 / 826	—N/a	43 / 96	—N/a	—N/a	203 / 19,103
Social Democratic and Labour Party (SDLP)	1970	Centre-left	Social democracy Irish nationalism	Claire Hanna	2 / 650	0 / 826	—N/a	—N/a	8 / 90	—N/a	34 / 19,103
Your Party	2025	Left-wing	Socialism	Collective leadership	2 / 650	0 / 826	0 / 129	0 / 60	—N/a	0 / 25	11 / 19,103
Alliance Party of Northern Ireland	1970	Centre to centre-left	Liberalism; Nonsectarianism	Naomi Long	1 / 650	0 / 826	—N/a	—N/a	17 / 90	—N/a	65 / 19,103
Ulster Unionist Party (UUP)	1905	Centre-right	British unionism Conservatism	Jon Burrows	1 / 650	3 / 826	—N/a	—N/a	9 / 90	—N/a	51 / 19,103
Traditional Unionist Voice (TUV)	2007	Right-wing	British unionism National conservatism Social conservatism Euroscepticism	Jim Allister	1 / 650	0 / 826	—N/a	—N/a	1 / 90	—N/a	10 / 19,103
Restore Britain	2026	Far-right	Ethnic nationalism	Rupert Lowe	1 / 650	0 / 826	0 / 129	0 / 60	0 / 90	0 / 25	29 / 19,103

== Parties with representation in UK constituent country legislatures ==
There are a few political parties in the United Kingdom that do not have representation in the House of Commons, but have elected representatives in the Northern Ireland Assembly and Scottish Parliament. These are:

Party	Founded	Political position	Ideology	Current leader	Scottish Parliament	NI Assembly	Local government
Scottish Greens	1990	Centre-left to left-wing	Green politics Scottish independence Scottish republicanism	Ross Greer, Gillian Mackay (job share)	15 / 129	—N/a	33 / 19,103
People Before Profit (PBP)	2005	Left-wing to far-left	Socialism; Trotskyism; Anti-capitalism; Irish reunification	Richard Boyd Barrett	—N/a	1 / 90	2 / 19,103

== Party descriptions ==
Party	Description
Labour Party	A social democratic party that has its roots in the trade union movement. The party has several internal factions, which include: Progress, which promotes a continuation of New Labour policies and is considered to be on the right of the party; the soft-left Open Labour; Momentum, which represents the party's left-wing, democratic socialist grouping; and Blue Labour, which promotes socially and culturally conservative values while remaining committed to labour rights and left-wing economics. Labour also has candidates who stand on a split-ticket with the Co-operative Party.
Co-operative Party	A party that promotes cooperative principles and values, providing political representation for the British co-operative movement. Since 1927, the party has been in an electoral alliance with the Labour Party, standing joint candidates under the Labour and Co-operative label.
Conservative and Unionist Party	A politically conservative party loosely divided into three categories: the One Nation Conservatives; the Thatcherites, who strongly support a free market with restrained government spending and tend to be Eurosceptic; and the Cornerstone Group.
Liberal Democrats	A liberal party; its main branches are social liberals based around the Social Liberal Forum, and the more centrist Liberal Reform grouping, which places more of an emphasis on economic liberalism. There is also a social democratic faction and influence within the party.
Scottish National Party (SNP)	Scottish nationalist and social democratic party which supports Scottish independence and membership of the European Union or further devolution for Scotland.
Sinn Féin (Irish for 'We Ourselves')	Irish republican party dedicated to the reunification of Ireland and the creation of a new republic based on democratic socialist values. It holds a policy of abstentionism for the House of Commons, with its MPs not taking their seats in this legislature.
Reform UK	Right-wing populist and hard Eurosceptic party.
Democratic Unionist Party (DUP)	Strongly British unionist party in Northern Ireland which promotes social and national conservatism.
Green Party of England and Wales	Green party that combines environmentalism and sustainability with left-wing economic policy, while taking a progressive approach on social issues. The party also has eco-socialist and anti-capitalist factions, such as the Green Left grouping.
Plaid Cymru (Welsh for 'Party of Wales')	Centre-left, social democratic, and Welsh nationalist party in favour of Welsh independence or further devolution of powers to Wales while Wales remains part of the UK.
Social Democratic and Labour Party (SDLP)	Irish nationalist and social-democratic party supporting a united Ireland.
Alliance Party of Northern Ireland (APNI)	Liberal, nonsectarian and pro-European political party in Northern Ireland.
Ulster Unionist Party (UUP)	Conservative and Unionist party in Northern Ireland, taking a somewhat "softer" stance on social issues than the DUP. The party was formerly tied to the Conservative Party in Great Britain.
Traditional Unionist Voice (TUV)	Strongly social and national conservative unionist party in Northern Ireland. It has formed an alliance with Reform UK.
Scottish Greens	Green party in favour of Scottish independence and Scottish republicanism.
People Before Profit (PBP)	Socialist and Trotskyist party that is active in both the Republic of Ireland and Northern Ireland.
Your Party	A socialist party.
Restore Britain	A far-right party advocating for mass deportations of illegal immigrants.

== Parties with representation only in UK local government ==
=== Great Britain-wide or UK-wide parties ===
Party	Founded	Political position	Ideology	Leader	Local authorities	Councillors
Liberal Party	1989	Centre	Liberalism (British), Euroscepticism	Steve Radford	Liverpool, North Yorkshire, East Devon, Wyre Forest	7
Workers Party of Britain	2019	Left-wing to far-left	Socialism, social conservatism, Euroscepticism	George Galloway	Rochdale, Calderdale, Bury, Birmingham	7
Social Democratic Party (SDP)	1990	Economic: Left-wing; Social: Right-wing	Social democracy, cultural conservatism, communitarianism, Euroscepticism	Eleanor Rofe	Leeds, Wakefield, Durham	5
Party of Women	2024	Single-issue	Gender-critical feminism, anti-transgender	Kellie-Jay Keen-Minshull	Maldon	1
Trade Unionist and Socialist Coalition (TUSC)	2010	Left-wing to far-left	Trade unionism, socialism	Dave Nellist	Wrexham County Borough Council	1

=== Parties that only stand in a country or region of the UK ===
Party	Founded	Areas active	Political position	Ideology	Leader	Local authorities	Councillors
Green Party Northern Ireland	1981	Northern Ireland	Centre-left	Green politics, nonsectarianism	Mal O'Hara	Ards and North Down, Belfast	5
Mebyon Kernow (Cornish for 'Sons of Cornwall')	1951	Cornwall	Centre-left	Cornish nationalism, civic nationalism, regionalism, social democracy, environmentalism	Michael Bunney	Cornwall	3
British Unionist Party	2015	Scotland	Syncretic	British unionism, Scottish unionism, Social conservatism, Social democracy, British nationalism	John Ferguson	North Lanarkshire Council	1
Gwlad (Welsh for 'Nation')	2018	Wales	Centre-right	Welsh nationalism, Welsh independence	Gwyn Wigley Evans	Ceredigion County Council	1
National Flood Prevention Party	2011	England	—N/a	Single-issue	Ewan Larcombe	Windsor and Maidenhead Borough Council	1
Progressive Unionist Party (PUP)	1979	Northern Ireland	Centre-left to left-wing	British unionism, democratic socialism, social democracy	Russell Watton	Causeway Coast and Glens	1
Propel	2020	Wales	Big-tent	Welsh nationalism, Welsh independence, localism, sovereignism	Neil McEvoy	Cardiff	1
Aontú	2019	Northern Ireland	Fiscal: Left-wing; Social: Right-wing	Anti-abortion, Irish republicanism, social conservatism, Soft Euroscepticism	Peadar Tóibín	Causeway Coast and Glens	1

=== Local parties ===
Party	Leader	Local authorities	Councillors
Aspire	Kalam Mahmud Abu Taher Choudhury	Tower Hamlets Council	32
Ashfield Independents	Jason Zadrozny	Ashfield, Nottinghamshire	30
The People's Independent Party	Warren Gibson	Castle Point	25
Residents Associations of Epsom and Ewell	Keith Lugton	Epsom and Ewell, Surrey	24
Residents for Uttlesford	Petrina Lees	Uttlesford, Essex County Council	20
Broxtowe Alliance		Broxtowe Borough Council, Nottinghamshire County Council	19
Farnham Residents	No leader	Surrey County Council, Waverley	16
4BWD		Blackburn with Darwen Borough Council	16
Canvey Island Independent Party	David Blackwell	Castle Point, Essex	14
Our West Lancashire	Adrian Owens	West Lancashire Borough Council, Lancashire County Council	13
Pendle Community Independents Group	Asjad Mahmood	Pendle Borough Council	13
Basingstoke & Deane Independents	Christopher Tomblin	Basingstoke and Deane	12
Community Campaign (Hart)	James Radley	Hart District Council, Hampshire County Council	12
Havering Residents Association		Havering London Borough Council	11
Lincolnshire Independents	Marianne Overton	Lincolnshire County Council, North Kesteven District Council, West Lindsey District Council	11
Loughton Residents Association	—N/a	Epping Forest District	11
Great Yarmouth First (Note: It is a local affiliate party of Restore Britain)	Jonathan Wedon	Norfolk County Council, Great Yarmouth Borough Council	10
Temple and Farringdon Together		Court of Common Council (City of London)	10
Ashford Independents	Noel Ovenden	Ashford Borough Council	9
South Holland Independents	Paul Barnes	South Holland District Council, Lincolnshire County Council	9
Christchurch Independents		BCP Council	8
Peterborough First		Peterborough City Council	8
West Suffolk Independents	Victor Lukaniuk	West Suffolk District	8
Oxted & Limpsfield Residents Group		Tandridge District	8
Residents for Guildford and Villages	Jonathan Bigmore	Guildford, Surrey	8
Swale Independents	Mike Baldock	Kent County Council, Swale Borough Council	8
Stafford Borough Independents		Borough of Stafford	7
Ashtead Independents	Chris Hunt	Mole Valley District Council, Surrey	7
Progressive Change North Lanarkshire	Greg Lennon	North Lanarkshire Council	7
Whitehill & Bordon Community Party	Andy Tree	East Hampshire District Council, Hampshire County Council	7
Rother Association of Independent Councillors		Rother District Council	6
The Black Country Party	Peter "Pete" Lowe	Dudley	6
Broxtowe Independent Group	Richard MacRae	Broxtowe Borough Council, Nottinghamshire County Council	6
Nottingham People's Alliance	Kirsty Jones	Nottingham City Council	6
Reform Derby	Alan Graves	Derby City Council	6
Radcliffe First		Bury Metropolitan Borough Council	6
Flintshire People's Voice	Sam Swash	Flintshire County Council	6
BCP Independent Group	No Leader	Bournemouth, Christchurch and Poole Council	5
Independent Oxford Alliance	Anne Gwinnett	Oxford City Council, Oxfordshire County Council	5
Local Alliance	Timothy Johnson	Chichester District Council, West Sussex County Council	5
Poole People Party	Mark Howell	Bournemouth, Christchurch and Poole Council	5
Maldon District Independent Group	Richard Siddall	Maldon District	5
Residents of Wilmslow	No Leader	Cheshire East Council	4
Henley Residents Group	Gill Dodds	South Oxfordshire, Oxfordshire	4
Horwich and Blackrod First	David Grant	Bolton Council	4
Independent Network	Marianne Overton	City of Chelmsford, Wigan Metropolitan Borough Council	4
Llantwit First Independents	Gwyn John	Vale of Glamorgan Council	4
Molesey Residents' Association	Stuart Selleck	Surrey County Council, Elmbridge Borough Council	4
Nork Residents' Association	No leader	Reigate and Banstead, Surrey	4
Runnymede Independent Residents' Group	Elaine Gill	Runnymede	4
Thames Ditton & Weston Green Residents' Association	Graham Cooke	Elmbridge Borough Council	4
Thornaby Independent Association	No Leader	Stockton-on-Tees Borough Council	4
Boston Independents	Anne Dorrian	Boston Borough Council	3
Morley Borough Independents	Robert Finnigan	Leeds City Council	3
Tunbridge Wells Alliance	Nicholas Pope	Tunbridge Wells Borough Council	3
Chislehurst Matters		Bromley Borough Council	3
Edgeley Community Association		Stockport Metropolitan Borough Council	3
Esher Residents Association	No leader	Elmbridge Borough Council	3
Farnworth and Kearsley First	Peter Flitcroft	Bolton Council	3
Guildford Greenbelt Group	Susan Parker	Guildford	3
Garforth and Swillington Independents Party		Leeds City Council	3
Halstead Residents' Association		Braintree District	3
Harold Wood Hill Park Residents Association		Havering London Borough Council	3
Independents for Dorset	Les Fry	Dorset Council	3
Ingleby Barwick Independent Society	Kenneth Dixon	Stockton-on-Tees Borough Council	3
Liverpool Community Independents	Alan Gibbons	Liverpool City Council	3
Malvern Hills Independents		Malvern Hills District	3
Morecambe Bay Independents	Geoff Knight	Lancaster City Council	3
Newport Independents Party	Kevin Whitehead	Newport, South Wales	3
Nottingham Independents	Kevin Clarke	Nottingham City Council	3
Portishead Independents		North Somerset Council	3
Rochford District Residents	No Leader	Rochford District	3
Tattenhams & Preston Residents	No leader	Reigate and Banstead, Surrey	3
Whitnash Residents Association		Warwick District	3
Wickford Independents	No leader	Basildon Borough Council	3
Derbyshire Community Party		Amber Valley Borough Council	2
Brighton & Hove Independents		Brighton and Hove City Council	2
Kingston Independent Residents Group	James Giles	Kingston upon Thames London Borough Council	2
Hinchley Wood Residents Association	Saranne Bristow	Elmbridge Borough Council	2
Independent Alliance (Kent)		Tonbridge and Malling	2
Independents@Swansea		City and County of Swansea Council	1
It's Our County		Herefordshire Council	2
Merton Park Ward Residents Association	Peter Southgate	Merton London Borough Council	2
The Borough First	Suzanne Cross	Windsor and Maidenhead Borough Council	1
Old Windsor Residents Association	Jane Dawson	Windsor and Maidenhead Borough Council	2
Poole Engage Party	Judy Butt	BCP Council	2
Rushcliffe Independents		Rushcliffe Borough Council	2
Tewkesbury and Twyning Independents	No Leader	Tewkesbury Borough Council	2
Uplands Party	Peter May	Swansea Council	2
Community First		Rossendale Council	1
The Walton Society	No leader	Elmbridge Borough Council	1
Weybridge & St. George's Independents	no leader	Elmbridge Borough Council	1
Alderley Edge First	Mike Dudley-Jones	Cheshire East	1
Arise	Pamela Fitzpatrick	Harrow London Borough Council	1
Blue Revolution	Rosalyn Parker-Lee	Boston Borough Council	1
City Independents	No Leader	Stoke-on-Trent City Council	1
East Cleveland Independent	No leader	Redcar and Cleveland Borough Council	1
Failsworth Independent Party		Oldham Council	1
Independent Reformers	Bill Barrett	Kent County Council	1
People Against Bureaucracy	Stan Smith	Cheltenham, Gloucestershire	1
Tendring First	Terry Allen	Tendring District Council	1
The Rubbish Party	Sally Cogley	East Ayrshire	1
West Dunbartonshire Community Party	Drew MacEoghainn	West Dunbartonshire Council	1
Better Way Of	Amelia Randall	Kent County Council	1
One Leicester	Rita Patel	Leicester City Council	1
The Potteries Party	Andy Polshaw	Stoke-on-Trent City Council	1

== Parties with no elected representation ==
This is a table of notable minor parties. Many parties are registered with the Electoral Commission but do not qualify for this list as they have not received significant independent coverage. Parties active across Ireland may have representation in the Republic of Ireland but not Northern Ireland.

Party	Political position	Ideology	Leader
4 Freedoms Party (UK EEP)	Centre-right	Conservatism, pro-Europeanism	Dirk Hazell
Abolish the Scottish Parliament Party	—N/a	Scottish Parliament abolition, Scottish Unionism, Anti-Devolution	John Mortimer
Abolish the Welsh Assembly Party	—N/a	Welsh Parliament abolition, Anti-Devolution, British Unionism	Richard Suchorzewski
Alliance for Workers' Liberty (AWL)	Far-left	Trotskyism, Third camp	Collective Leadership
Animal Welfare Party (AWP)	—N/a	Animal welfare	Vanessa Hudson
Britain First	Far-right	British fascism, neo-fascism, ultranationalism, British unionism, anti-Islam, Euroscepticism	Paul Golding
British Democrats (BDP)	Far-right	British nationalism, anti-immigration, anti-Islam, economic nationalism, monarchism	Jim Lewthwaite
British First Party	Far-right	Neo-Nazism, White supremacy	Kevin Quinn
British National Party (BNP)	Far-right	British fascism, right-wing populism, white nationalism, ethnic nationalism, ultranationalism, hard Euroscepticism	Adam Walker
Christian Party	Right-wing	Christian right, social conservatism, British unionism Euroscepticism	Jeff Green
Christian Peoples Alliance (CPA)	Right-wing	Christian right, Christian democracy, social conservatism, Euroscepticism	Sidney Cordle
Climate Party	Centre-right	Green conservatism	Edmund Gemmell
Common Good	—N/a	Christian democracy, social conservatism, anti-Islam	Dick Rodgers
Communist League	Far-left	Communism, Euroscepticism	No clear leader
Communist Party of Britain (CPB)	Far-left	Communism, Marxism-Leninism	Alex Gordon
Communist Party of Britain (Marxist-Leninist) (CPB-ML)	Far-left	Communism, Marxism-Leninism, hard Euroscepticism	No clear leader
Communist Party of Great Britain (Marxist-Leninist) (CPGB-ML)	Far-left	Communism, Marxism-Leninism, Stalinism, anti-revisionism	Ella Rule
Communist Party of Great Britain (Provisional Central Committee)	Far-left	Communism, Leninism, anti-Stalinism	Collective leadership
Communist Party of Ireland	Far-left	Communism, Marxism-Leninism	
Cornish Nationalist Party	—N/a	Cornish nationalism, Cornish devolution, pan-Celticism	Unknown
Count Binface Party		Political satirism	Jon Harvey (as Count Binface)
Cross-Community Labour Alternative	—N/a	Democratic socialism, trade unionism, nonsectarianism, eco-socialism	Owen McCracken
Democrats and Veterans	—N/a	Direct democracy, Euroscepticism	Collective leadership
Derwentside Independents	—N/a	Localism	Watts Stelling
Devizes Guardians	—N/a	Localism, Conservation	Nigel Carter
English Democrats	Far-right	English nationalism, English parliamentary devolution, Euroscepticism	Robin Tilbrook
Éirígí	Left-wing	Socialism, Irish republicanism, anti-imperialism, Euroscepticism, environmentalism	Brian Leeson
Equality Party	—N/a	Equality, anti-discrimination, social justice	Kay Wesley
Everyone is God Party		Sex-positive movement	Marcus White and Rosie Morell
Fianna Fáil (Major party in the Republic of Ireland)	Centre to centre-right	Conservatism, Christian democracy, Irish nationalism, pro-Europeanism	Micheál Martin
Give Me Back Elmo	—N/a	Fathers' rights, Parental equality, Family court reform, Shared parenting, Political satirism	Bobby Smith
Heritage Party	Right-wing	Euroscepticism, right-wing populism, British nationalism	David Kurten
Homeland Party (UK)	Far-right	British nationalism, ethnic nationalism	Kenny Smith
Independence for Scotland Party (ISP)	—N/a	Scottish independence	Colette Walker
Independent Union	—N/a	Euroscepticism	Shane Moore
Independents for Frome	—N/a	Localism, Conservation	Richard Ackroyd
Irish Republican Socialist Party	Far-left	Irish republicanism, Communism, Marxism-Leninism, Anti-globalisation, hard Euroscepticism	Collective leadership
Left Unity	Left-wing	Socialism, anti-capitalism, environmentalism, feminism	Sharon McCourt; Joseph Healy; Nick Jones (Principal Speakers)
Libertarian Party	—N/a	Libertarianism, classical liberalism	Adam Brown
Llais Gwynedd	—N/a	Gwynedd regionalism	Owain Williams
Mexborough First		Localism	Andrew Pickering
New Millennium Bean Party	—N/a	Political satirism	Barry Kirk (as Captain Beany)
National Front (NF)	Far-right	Fascism, neo-fascism, British nationalism, white supremacism Factions: Neo-Nazism, right-wing populism, Third Positionism	Tony Martin
National Liberal Party	Far-right	Euroscepticism	Upkar Singh Rai
Newcastle Independents	Left-wing	Localism, Left-wing populism	Jason Smith
New Communist Party of Britain	Far-left	Communism, Marxism-Leninism, anti-revisionism, hard Euroscepticism	Andy Brooks
North East Party	Centre to centre-left	Regionalism, progressivism	Mark Burdon
Northern Independence Party (NIP)	Left-wing	Northern independence, democratic socialism	Philip Proudfoot and Evie McGovern
Official Monster Raving Loony Party (OMRLP)	—N/a	Political satirism	Alan "Howling Laud" Hope
Peace Party	—N/a	Pacifism, environmentalism	John Morris
Pirate Party	—N/a	Pirate politics, civil libertarianism	Jason Artemis Winstanley
Portsmouth Independents Party		Localism	
Reclaim Party	Right-wing	Right-wing populism	Laurence Fox
Republican Network for Unity	Left-wing	Irish republicanism, socialism	Gary McNally
Republican Sinn Féin	Left-wing	Irish republicanism, Irish nationalism, Éire Nua, socialism, Euroscepticism, abstentionism, secularism	Seosamh Ó Maoileoin
Revolutionary Communist Party (RCP)	Far-left	Communism, Marxism, Scientific Socialism, Leninism, Trotskysm, Revolutionary socialism	Fiona Lali
Revolutionary Communist Party Britain (Marxist-Leninist) (RCPB-ML)	Far-left	Communism, anti-revisionism, Hoxhaism, Marxism-Leninism	Chris Coleman
Saoradh	Far-left	Irish republicanism, dissident republicanism, revolutionary socialism, hard Euroscepticism, anti-imperialism	Collective leadership
Scottish Family Party	Right-wing	Christian right, social conservatism, anti-abortion, anti-LGBTQ	Richard Lucas
Scottish Libertarian Party	—N/a	Libertarianism, classical liberalism, minarchism, Scottish independence, Euroscepticism	Tam Laird
Scottish Socialist Party	Left-wing	Democratic socialism, Scottish independence, Scottish republicanism	Collective leadership
Social Justice	Left-wing	Environmentalism, democratic socialism	Simon Chester
Socialist Equality Party	Far-left	Trotskyism	No clear leader
Socialist Labour Party (SLP)	Left-wing	Socialism, fiscal localism, republicanism, hard Euroscepticism	Jim McDaid
Socialist Party (England and Wales)	Far-left	Revolutionary socialism, Trotskyism, Marxism	Hannah Sell
Socialist Party (Ireland)	Left-wing to far-left	Democratic socialism, political radicalism, Trotskyism, Euroscepticism	Collective leadership
Socialist Party of Great Britain (SPGB)	Left-wing	Socialism, Orthodox Marxism, Impossibilism	Collective leadership
Socialist Party Scotland	Far-left	Socialism, Trotskyism, trade unionism	No clear leader
Socialist Workers Network (SWN)	Far-left	Trotskyism, Irish reunification	Collective leadership
Socialist Workers Party (SWP)	—N/a	Trotskyism	Collective leadership
Southend Confelicity Party	Big tent	Localism, Anti-Essex Devolution	James Miller
Taking The Initiative Party (TTIP)	—N/a	Multiculturalism	Charles Gordon and Sasha Johnson
UK Independence Party (UKIP)	Far-right	Euroscepticism, Right-wing populism, National conservatism, Economic liberalism, British nationalism	Nick Tenconi
Volt UK	Centre to centre-left	Pro-Europeanism, European federalism, social liberalism, progressivism	Jamie Beresford
Wessex Regionalists	—N/a	Wessex regionalism, agrarianism	Nick Xylas
Whig Party	Centre	Pro-Europeanism, social progressivism, Whiggism	Waleed Ghani
Workers Revolutionary Party	Far-left	Trotskyism, Euroscepticism	Joshua Ogunleye
Workers' Party (Ireland)	Far-left	Communism, Marxism-Leninism, Irish republicanism	Michael McCorry
Yorkshire Party	Centre to centre-left	Yorkshire regionalism, social democracy	Bob Buxton
Yoruba Party	—N/a	Yoruba diaspora interests	Olusola Oni

== Defunct parties ==
Party	Foundation / dissolution	Leader at dissolution	Ideology	Political position	Fate
Advance Together	2017–2020	Annabel Mullin	Social liberalism, subsidiarity, reformism, pro-Europeanism	Centre	
Advance UK	2025–2026	Ben Habib	British nationalism	Far-right	
Alba Party	2021–2026	Kenny MacAskill	Scottish nationalism, Scottish independence, social conservatism	Centre-left to centre-right	Dissolved after a financial crisis
Alliance for Local Living	2018–2024	Felicity Rice	Localism, Nonpartisanism	—N/a	
Anti-Federalist League	1991–1993	Alan Sked	Euroscepticism	Right-wing	Became UKIP
Blaenau Gwent People's Voice	2005–2010	No clear leader	Localism, Populism	—N/a	Dissolved following retirement of elected representatives
Borders Party	2006–2020	Frances Pringle	Localism	—N/a	
Boston Bypass Independents	2006–2012	Helen Staples	Localism	—N/a	
Britannica Party	2011–2020	Charles Baillie	British Fascism, Right-wing populism	Far-right	
British First Party	2007	Kevin Quinn	Neo-Nazism, White supremacy	Far-right	
British Freedom Party (BFP)	2010–2012	Kevin Carroll	British nationalism, Euroscepticism, Anti-Islam	Far-right	
Burning Pink	2020–2022	Roger Hallam	Environmentalism, sortition	Left-wing	Leaders co-founded Just Stop Oil
Burnley and Padiham Independent Party	2017–2023	Mark Payne	Localism	—N/a	
Cannabis Is Safer Than Alcohol (CISTA)	2015–2016	Paul Birch	Cannabis legalisation	—N/a	
Church of the Militant Elvis Party	2001-2023	David Bishop	Political satire		
Class War	2014–2015	No clear leader	Anarchism	Left-wing to far-left	
Community Action Party	2002–2016	Michael Moulding	Environmentalism, Localism	Centre-left	
Communist Party of Great Britain	1920–1991	Nina Temple	Marxism-Leninism (Until 1970s) Eurocommunism, Gramscianism (After 1977)	Far-left	
Communist Party of Scotland	1992–2017	No clear leader	Communism, Marxism-Leninism, Scottish independence	Far-left	
The Community Group (Hounslow)	1994–2016	Ian Speed	Localism	—N/a	
Transform	2023-2025	Collective leadership	Eco-socialism, democratic socialism, progressivism	Left-wing	Merged into Your Party
Countryside Party	2000–2008	No clear leader	Agrarianism, Conservatism	Right-wing	
Democratic Alliance of Wales	1999–2008	Mike German	Localism	—N/a	
Democratic Labour	1972–1979	Dick Taverne	Social democracy	Centre-left	Merged into Social Democratic Alliance
Democratic Party	1998–2010	Geoff Southall	Euroscepticism, direct democracy	Right-wing	
East Kilbride Alliance	2007–2012	No clear leader	Localism	Centre-left	
Ecology Party	1975–1985	Tony Whittaker	Green politics	Left-wing	Became Green Party (UK)
England First	2003–2012	Mark Cotterill	Ethnic nationalism, English nationalism, English independence, Euroscepticism	Far-right	Supported the English Democrats in the 2009 European Parliament election; later deregistered
Equal Parenting Alliance	2006–2020	Ray Barry	Fathers' rights movement	—N/a	
Fancy Dress Party	1979–2017	Steven Fumpleton	Political satire	—N/a	
Fellowship Party	1955–2007	Sidney Fagan	Environmentalism, Pacifism, Christian socialism, anti-nuclear	Left-wing	Leaders retired
Fishing Party (Scotland)	2003–2004	George Geddes	Single-issue	—N/a	
For Britain Movement	2017–2022	Anne Marie Waters	Anti-Islam, Right-wing populism, British nationalism, National conservatism, Hard Euroscepticism	Far-right	
For Darwen Party	2007–2013	Stephen Potter	Localism, Hard Euroscepticism	Right-wing	
Forward Wales	2003–2010	John Marek	Socialism, Welsh nationalism	Left-wing	
Free Party	1997–2002	No clear leader	Political satire, "Slack", promotion of free party scene		Deregistered following failure to submit expenses to the Electoral Commission
Green Party UK	1985–1990	Tom Wood	Green politics	Left-wing	Became Green Party of England and Wales and Scottish Green Party
Glasgow First	2012–2015	Gerrard McCue	Social democracy	Centre-left	
Harold Hill Independent	2017–2018	Lorraine Moss	Localism	—N/a	
Heavy Woollen District Independents	2017–2022	Aleksandar Lukic	Localism	—N/a	
Highlands and Islands Alliance	1998–2004	Lorraine Mann	Localism, Regionalism, Soft Euroscepticism	—N/a	
Independence from Europe	2012–2017	Mike Nattrass	Euroscepticism, state ownership, direct democracy, English devolution	Right-wing	Deregistered following electoral failure and retirement of elected representatives; remaining councillor defected to the Lincolnshire Independents
The Independent Group for Change	2019	Anna Soubry	Centrism, pro-Europeanism	Centre	Dissolved following defections to the Liberal Democrats and defeat of elected representatives
Independent Community and Health Concern	2001–2023	Harry Grove	Localism		Deregistered; founder and president Richard Taylor co-founded the National Health Action Party in 2012
Independent Working Class Association (IWCA)	1995–2020	No clear leader	Socialism, Localism	Left-wing	
Islamic Party of Britain	1989–2006	David Musa Pidcock	Islamism		
Jury Team	2009–2011	Sir Paul Judge	Nonpartisan politics, Localism, Direct democracy	Big tent	
Legalise Cannabis Alliance	1997–2013	Peter Reynolds	Cannabis legalisation, Drug policy reform	—N/a	
Left List	2008–2010	Collective leadership	Socialism	Left-wing	Folded following resignation of leaders and defections of elected representatives (chiefly to the Labour Party)
Lewisham People Before Profit	2008-2022	Patricia Richardson	Socialism, Localism	Left-wing	
Liberal Party	1859–1988	David Steel (Note: The SDP-Liberal Alliance at dissolution was jointly led by Steel as the leader of the Liberal Party and Robert Maclennan as the leader of the SDP.)	Liberalism, Classical liberalism, Social liberalism	Centre	Merged with SDP to form Liberal Democrats
Liberty GB	2013–2017	Paul Weston	Hard Euroscepticism, Right-wing populism, British nationalism, Social conservatism	Far-right	
Make Politicians History	2005–2009	Ronnie Carroll	Anti-Parliamentarianism	—N/a	Folded following death of Carroll
Mansfield Independents	2005-2025	Martin Wright	Localism		Deregistered after defections to Reform UK
Militant tendency	1964-1991	No clear leader	Socialism, Trotskyism, democratic socialism	Far-left	An entryist group in the Labour Party, Militant abandoned entryism following the Poll Tax protests and then split into two groups, forming Socialist Appeal and the Socialist Party
Movement for Active Democracy	2009-2023		Direct democracy		
MP3 Party	2002–2007	Ruslan Fedorovsky	Political satire	—N/a	
National Democrats (ND)	1995–2011	No clear leader	British nationalism, Right-wing populism, Third positionism, Euroscepticism, National conservatism	Far-right	
National Health Action Party (NHA)	2012-2025	Alastair Fischer and Veronika Wagner	Re-nationalisation of the NHS, environmentalism, anti-austerity, reformism		
Nationalist Alliance	2005–2008	Catherine Parker-Brown	White supremacy	Far-right	
Natural Law Party (NLP)	1992–2004	No clear leader	Pro-Transcendental Meditation	—N/a	
New Deal	2013–2015	Alan Sked	Euroscepticism, social liberalism	Centre-left	Deregistered without ever having fought an election
New Party	2003–2010	Richard Vass	Neoliberalism, Economic liberalism, Internationalism, Euroscepticism, Right-libertarianism	Right-wing	
No2EU	2009–2014	No clear leader	Euroscepticism, Socialism	Left-wing	Electoral alliance disbanded upon successful vote for Brexit
No Candidate Deserves My Vote!	2000–2012	Amanda Ringwood	Electoral reform, None of the above	—N/a	
Northern Ireland Women's Coalition (NIWC)	1996–2006	Monica McWilliams; Pearl Sagar	Nonsectarianism	—N/a	Folded following defeat of elected representatives
Northern Party	2015–2016	Michael Dawson	Northern England Regionalism	—N/a	
NI21	2013–2016	Basil McCrea	Ulster unionism, Social liberalism, Secularism, Nonsectarianism, Pro-Europeanism	Centre	
Official National Front	1986–1990	Patrick Harrington	White nationalism, white separatism, ethnic nationalism, Third Position	Far-right	Became Third Way
One London	2005–2008	Damian Hockney	Euroscepticism	Right-wing	Deregistered following poor results in the 2008 London mayoral election and defeat of elected representatives
Orkney Manifesto Group	2013–2022	Rachael King	Localism	—N/a	
Peace and Progress Party	2004–2015	Chris Cooper	Human rights	—N/a	
Pro-Euro Conservative Party	1999–2001	John Stevens; Brendan Donnelly	One-nation conservatism, Liberal conservatism, Pro-Europeanism	Centre to centre-right	Merged into Liberal Democrats
ProLife Alliance	1996–2004	Josephine Quintavalle; Bruno Quintavalle	Anti-abortion	Single-issue	
Protestant Coalition	2013–2015	Robert McKee	Irish unionism, Ulster loyalism, British nationalism, Christian fundamentalism, Christian right	Far-right	
Raving Loony Green Giant Party	1989–1993	Stuart Hughes	Environmentalism, Political satire	—N/a	
Referendum Party	1994–1997	James Goldsmith	Euroscepticism	Single-issue	Folded following death of Goldsmith
Renew Party	2017–2022	James Clarke	Pro-Europeanism	Centre	
Respect Party	2004–2016	George Galloway	Anti-war, socialism, anti-capitalism, anti-imperialism, Euroscepticism	Left-wing to far-left	Declined and folded following splits in 2008 (to form Left List) and 2012 (against Galloway's leadership)
RISE - Scotland's Left Alliance	2015–2020	Jonathon Shafi	Anti-capitalism, Eco-socialism, Scottish independence, Scottish republicanism	Left-wing	
Rock 'n' Roll Loony Party	2000–2007	Chris Driver	Political satire	—N/a	
Save Huddersfield NHS	2006-2010	Jackie Grunsell	Protecting health services		
Science Party	2010-11	Michael Brooks	Technocracy		
Scotia Future	2020–2022	Chic Brodie	Scottish independence	—N/a	Dissolved following death of Brodie
Scottish Enterprise Party	2004–2009	Robert Lamb Watson	Scottish independence, Hard Euroscepticism	Centre-right	Became Scottish Democratic Alliance
Scottish Jacobite Party	2005–2007, 2010–2011	John Black	Scottish independence, Scottish republicanism, Euroscepticism	—N/a	Deregistered following 2007 Scottish Parliament election, re-registered for 2010 UK general election, deregistered afterwards
Scottish Voice	2007–2012	Archie Stirling	—N/a	Centre-right	
Senior Citizens Party	2004–2014	Grahame Leon-Smith	Senior citizen rights	Big tent	
Social Democratic Alliance (SDA)	1975–1981	No clear leader	Social democracy, Anti-communism	Centre to centre-left	Merged into Social Democratic Party
Social Democratic Party (SDP)	1981–1988	Robert Maclennan (Note: The SDP-Liberal Alliance at dissolution was jointly led by David Steel as the leader of the Liberal Party and Maclennan as the leader of the SDP.)	Social democracy, Social liberalism	Centre to centre-left	Merged with old Liberal Party to form Liberal Democrats
Socialist People's Party (Furness)	1995–2015	Jim Hamezian	Socialism	Left-wing	
Solidarity	2006–2021	Tommy Sheridan	Socialism, Scottish independence, Scottish republicanism, Euroscepticism	Left-wing to far-left	Merged into Alba Party
Something New	2014-2020	Dr James Smith	Syncretic	Radical centrism	
South Devon Alliance	2021–2024	Richard Daws	—N/a	—N/a	
Thurrock Independents	2018–2023	Gary Byrne	Localism, Populism, Nonpartisanism	Big tent	
Tower Hamlets First	2013–2015	Lutfur Rahman	Social democracy, Localism	Centre-left	Became Aspire
Trust Party	2010–2011	Stuart Wheeler	Soft Euroscepticism	Right-wing	
UK European Union Party	2019–2021	Pierre Kirk	Pro-Europeanism, Cultural liberalism, Social liberalism, Fiscal conservatism	Centre	
UK Unionist Party (UKUP)	1995–2008	Robert McCartney	British unionism, Nonsectarianism, Integrationism	Centre-right	
Ulster Popular Unionist Party	1980–1995	James Kilfedder	British unionism, Pro-devolution	Centre-right	Folded following death of Kilfedder
United in Europe	2014–2015	Charles Cormack	Liberalism, Pro-Europeanism	Centre-left	
United Kingdom First Party	2009–2010	Robin Page	Populism, Euroscepticism	Right-wing	
United Ulster Unionist Party (UUUP)	1975–1984	Ernest Baird	Ulster loyalism	Right-wing	
Vanguard Unionist Progressive Party (VUPP)	1972–1978	William Craig	British nationalism, Ulster loyalism	Right-wing to far-right	
Veritas	2005–2015	Therese Muchewicz	Right-wing populism, Euroscepticism	Right-wing	Merged into the English Democrats
Veterans and People's Party (VPP)	2017–2022	Robin Horsfall	Right-wing populism, British nationalism, hard Euroscepticism, paternalistic conservatism	Right-wing	
We Demand a Referendum Now (WDARN)	2012–2014	Nikki Sinclaire	Euroscepticism	Single-issue	Folded following Sinclaire's defeat in the 2014 European Parliament elections
White Nationalist Party (WNP)	2002–2005	No clear leader	White nationalism, Neo-fascism, White supremacy	Far-right	
Women's Equality Party	2015–2024	Mandu Reid	Feminism, egalitarianism, social justice		Former members formed the Equality Party

== Historical parties ==
- All-for-Ireland Party (1910–1918)
- Anti Common Market and Free Trade Party (1967–1988)
- British Democratic Party (1979–1982)
- British Fascists (1920s–1930s)
- British Movement (1968–1983)
- British National Party (1960–1967)
- British People's Party (1940s)
- British Socialist Party (1911–1920)
- British Ulster Dominion Party
- British Union of Fascists (1930s)
- Campaign for Social Democracy (1973–1974)
- Committee to Defeat Revisionism, for Communist Unity (1963–c. 1972)
- Common Wealth Party (1942–1945)
- Communist Labour Party (1920–1921)
- Communist League (1847–1852)
- Communist Party (BSTI) (1920–1921)
- Communist Party of South Wales and the West of England
- Constitutional Movement (1979–1984)
- Crofters Party
- Fife Socialist League (1950s–1960s)
- Flag Group (1980s)
- Highland Land League (1909–1920s)
- Independent Labour Party (1893–1975)
- International Marxist Group (1968–1982)
  [Organised the electoral coalition Socialist Unity]
- Irish Independence Party
- Irish Parliamentary Party
- Irish Unionist Alliance
- Labour Party of Northern Ireland
- Labour Party of Scotland (1973)
- Liberal Unionist Party (1886–1912)
- Manhood Suffrage League (1874–1881)
- National Democratic and Labour Party (1918–1923)
- National Democratic Party (1960s–1970s)
- National Independence Party (1970s)
- National Labour Party (1957–1960)
- National Liberal Party (1922–1923)
- National Liberal Party (1931–1968)
- National Party (1975–1977)
- National Party of Scotland (1928–1934)
- National Socialist Party (1916–1919)
- Nationalist Party (1918–1977) [Northern Irish party]
- New Party (1931–1932)
- Orkney and Shetland Movement
- Progressive Party (1920s–1970s) [Scottish party]
- Reform League (1865–1869)
- Revolutionary Communist Party (1944–1950)
- Revolutionary Socialist Party (1912–1941)
- Revolutionary Workers' Party (1962–1990s)
- Scottish Labour Party (1888–1893)
- Scottish Labour Party (1976–1981)
- Scottish Militant Labour (1990s)
- Scottish Party (1932–1934)
- Scottish Prohibition Party (1901–1935)
- Scottish Socialist Alliance
- Scottish Socialist Federation
- Scottish Voice
- Scottish Workers' Representation Committee (1899–1909)
- Scottish Workers' Republican Party
- Social Credit Party of Great Britain and Northern Ireland (1931–1951, 1965–1978)
- Social Democratic Federation (1884–1911)
- Socialist Labour Party (1903–1980)
- Socialist National Defence Committee (1915–1918)
- Ulster Liberal Party (1928, 1956–1987)
- Ulster Labour Unionists
- Union Movement (1948–1973)
- Unionist Party (1912–1965)
- United Country Party (1970s)
- United Socialist Movement (1934–1965)
- Universal League for the Material Elevation of the Industrious Classes (1863–1865)
- Vectis National Party (1970s) [Isle of Wight regionalist party]
- Women's Party (1917–1919)
- Workers Party of Scotland
- Workers' Socialist Federation (1914–1924)
- Working People's Party of England (1968–1986)

== See also ==
- Timeline of political parties in the United Kingdom
- List of political parties in the United Kingdom by representation
- United Kingdom government austerity programme
- List of British fascist parties
- Political make-up of local councils in the United Kingdom
- List of ruling political parties by country
- Politics of the United Kingdom
- Political party affiliation in the United Kingdom
- Elections in the United Kingdom
- List of political parties in Northern Ireland
- List of political parties in Scotland
- List of political parties in Wales
- List of political parties on the Isle of Man (a British Crown dependency)
- List of political parties in Gibraltar (a British overseas territory)
- Index of UK party meta attributes

== Sources ==
- Abedi, Amir; Lundberg, Thomas Carl (2009). "Doomed to Failure? UKIP and the Organisational Challenges Facing Right-Wing Populist Anti-Political Establishment Parties" (PDF). Parliamentary Affairs. 62 (1): 72–87. doi:10.1093/pa/gsn036.
- Art, David (2011). Inside the Radical Right: The Development of Anti-Immigrant Parties in Western Europe. Cambridge: Cambridge University Press. ISBN 978-1-139-49883-8.
- Driver, Stephen (2011). Understanding British Party Politics. Cambridge: Polity Press. ISBN 978-0-7456-4078-5.
- Dolezal, Martin (2012). "Restructuring the European Political Space: The Supply Side of European Electoral Politics". In Kriesi, Hanspeter; Grande, Edgar; Dolezal, Martin; Helbling, Marc; Höglinger, Dominic; Hutter, Swen; Wüest, Bruno (eds.). Political Conflict in Western Europe. Cambridge University Press. pp. 127–150. ISBN 978-1-107-02438-0.
- Jones, Owen (2011). Chavs: The Demonization of the Working Class. London: Verso. ISBN 978-1-84467-804-4.
- Liebert, Ulrike (2012). "Civil Society, Public Sphere and Democracy in the EU". In Eriksen, Erik Oddvar; Fossum, John Erik (eds.). Rethinking Democracy and the European Union. Abingdon: Routledge. pp. 112–42. ISBN 978-1-136-49090-3.
- Lynch, Philip; Whitaker, Richard; Loomes, Gemma (2012). "The UK Independence Party: Understanding a Niche Party's Strategy, Candidates and Supporters". Parliamentary Affairs. 65 (4): 733–757. doi:10.1093/pa/gsr042. hdl:2381/28316.
- Tournier-Sol, Karine (2015). "Reworking the Eurosceptic and Conservative Traditions into a Populist Narrative: UKIP's Winning Formula?". Journal of Common Market Studies. 53 (1): 140–156. doi:10.1111/jcms.12208. S2CID 142738345.
