= UIE =

UIE may refer to:

- United in Europe, political party in the UK (2014–2015)
- Union of Economic Interests, political party in Portugal (1925–1927)
- Unidentified infrared emission, in astronomy, also referred to as UIR
- UNESCO Institute for Education, one of six educational institutes of UNESCO
- User interface engineering, the design of user interfaces for machines and software
- Union Internationale des Étudiants, the International Union of Students (IUS), established in 1946 during the Cold War, with a pro-USSR stance
