= 2017 Newport City Council election =

UK Council elections

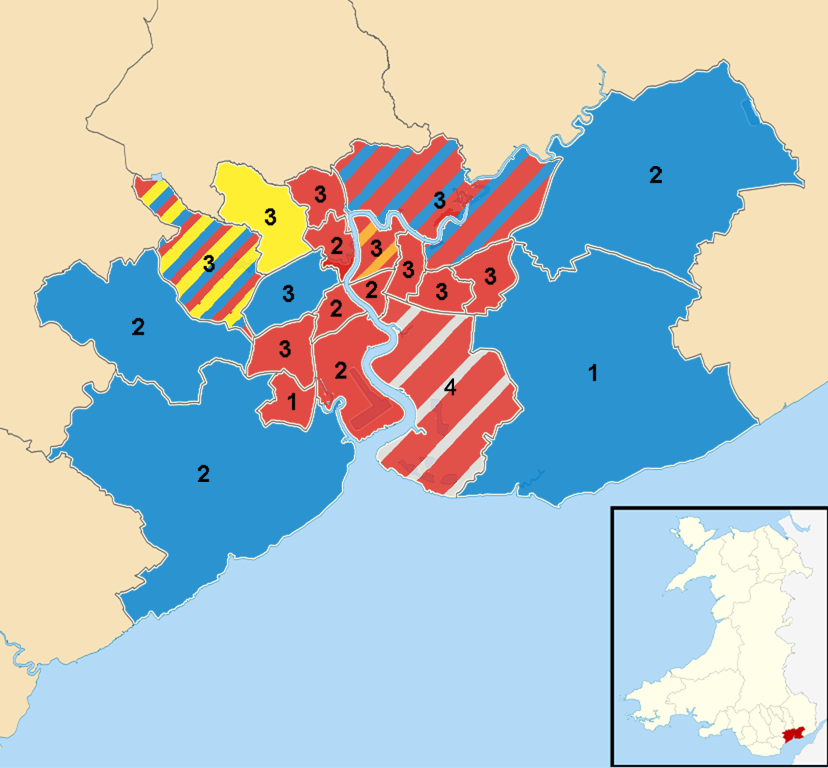
2017 election results map, showing numbers of councillors per ward and their party affiliations

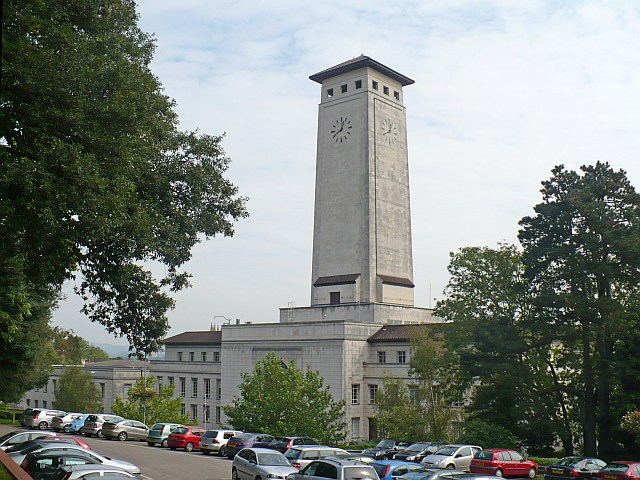
Newport Civic Centre

Elections to Newport City Council were held on 3 May 2017 along with elections to the other 21 local authorities in Wales, community council elections in Wales and 2017 United Kingdom local elections.

Councillors elected in this election would serve a five-year term due to the new Welsh Government policy.

The previous election took place on 3 May 2012.

The next full election took place in May 2022.

== Election results: overview ==
Newport City Council election 2017
Party	Seats	Gains	Losses	Net gain/loss	Seats %	Votes %	Votes	+/−
Labour	31			-6	62.0	36.1	15,869	-12.1
Conservative	12			+2	24.0	32.0	14,072	+3.3
Newport Ind.	4			+4	8.0	10.2	4,466	New
Liberal Democrats	2			+1	4.0	9.4	4,115	-3.6
Independent	1			-1	2.0	3.0	1,322	-1.8
Plaid Cymru	0			0	0.0	4.1	1,799	0.0
Green	0			0	0.0	1.9	814	+1.2
UKIP	0			0	0.0	3.5	1,534	New
Total	50						43,991	

== Ward results ==
Asterisks denote incumbent ward councillors seeking re-election.

=== Allt-yr-yn ===
Allt-yr-yn (3 seats)
Party	Candidate	Votes	%	±%
Conservative	Matthew Evans *	1,731		
Conservative	David Fouweather *	1,692		
Conservative	Charles Ferris *	1,610		
Labour	John Harris	985		
Labour	Kassim Hayat	841		
Labour	John Reynolds	840		
Plaid Cymru	Jonathan Clark	332		
Liberal Democrats	Sue Davies	331		
Liberal Democrats	Chloe Elding	244		
Liberal Democrats	John Miller	184		
Majority				
Turnout		8,790		
Conservative hold		Swing		
Conservative hold		Swing		
Conservative hold		Swing		

=== Alway ===
Alway (3 seats)
Party	Candidate	Votes	%	±%
Labour	Raymond Truman *	976		
Labour	Debbie Harvey *	931		
Labour	John Guy *	911		
Conservative	Carol Wallis	516		
Conservative	Amna Arshid	400		
Newport Ind.	Dave Jones	355		
Plaid Cymru	Cath Wixcey	195		
Liberal Democrats	Liam Biaggi	171		
Majority				
Turnout		4,455		
Labour hold		Swing		
Labour hold		Swing		
Labour hold		Swing		

=== Beechwood ===
Beechwood (3 seats)
Party	Candidate	Votes	%	±%
Labour	Deb Davies *	978		
Labour	Graham Berry	936		
Labour	Mark Spencer *	875		
Liberal Democrats	Tony Biaggi	488		
Liberal Democrats	Sarah Lockyer	447		
Liberal Democrats	Pete Brown	444		
Conservative	Georgina Webb	420		
Conservative	Michael Weekes	378		
UKIP	Tim Price	260		
Newport Ind.	Julie Price	213		
Majority				
Turnout		6,510		
Labour gain from Liberal Democrats		Swing		
Labour gain from Liberal Democrats		Swing		
Labour gain from Liberal Democrats		Swing		

=== Bettws ===
Bettws (3 seats)
Party	Candidate	Votes	%	±%
Newport Ind.	Kevin Whitehead *	897		
Newport Ind.	Janet Cleverly *	816		
Newport Ind.	Jason Jordan	744		
Labour	Sandra Daniell	541		
Labour	Chris Jarvis	467		
Labour	Philip Saunders	411		
Conservative	Lewis Williams	212		
Conservative	Timothy Masters	181		
Conservative	Huw Davies	178		
Green	Peter Varley	106		
Majority				
Turnout		4,553		
Newport Ind. gain from Independent		Swing		
Newport Ind. gain from Independent		Swing		
Newport Ind. gain from Labour		Swing		

Whitehead had been elected as an independent in 2012. Cleverly had been elected as an independent at a by-election in 2015.

=== Caerleon ===
Caerleon (3 seats)
Party	Candidate	Votes	%	±%
Labour	Gail Giles *	1,336		
Conservative	Joan Watkins	1,282		
Labour	Jason Hughes	1,166		
Conservative	Michael Enea	1,095		
Conservative	Richard Andrews	1,079		
Labour	Mike Singleton	1,065		
Liberal Democrats	Paul l'Allier	392		
Liberal Democrats	Andy White	376		
UKIP	Stan Edwards	309		
Liberal Democrats	Laura Ricketts	239		
Majority				
Turnout		8,339		
Labour gain from		Swing		
Labour hold		Swing		
Conservative gain from Labour		Swing		

=== Gaer ===
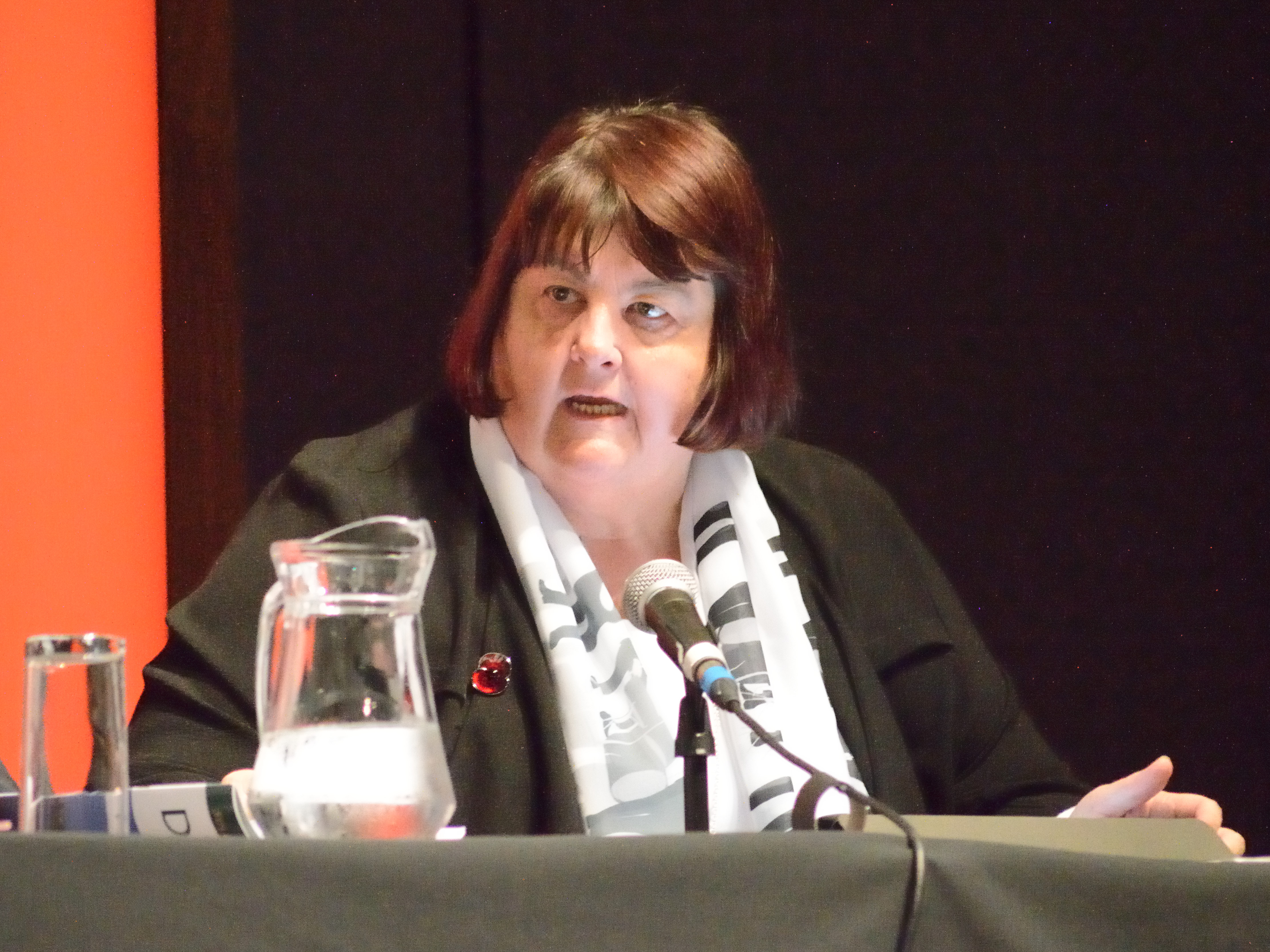
Debbie Wilcox, Newport City Council leader since 2016

Gaer (3 seats)
Party	Candidate	Votes	%	±%
Labour	Stephen Marshall	1,019		
Labour	Mark Whitcutt *	994		
Labour	Deborah Wilcox *	991		
Conservative	Lloyd Walsh	847		
Conservative	Miriam Shwartz	778		
Conservative	Saleh Baqi	672		
Newport Ind.	Rhys Richards	324		
Liberal Democrats	Paul Woodcock-Jones	199		
Majority				
Turnout		5,824		
Labour gain from		Swing		
Labour hold		Swing		
Labour gain from		Swing		

=== Graig ===
Graig (2 seats)
Party	Candidate	Votes	%	±%
Conservative	David Williams *	1,026		
Conservative	Margaret Cornelious *	976		
Labour	Victoria Cox-Wall	825		
Labour	Paul Davies	758		
Liberal Democrats	Nathan Tarr	194		
Green	Issica Baron	153		
Majority				
Turnout		3,932		
Conservative hold		Swing		
Conservative hold		Swing		

=== Langstone ===
Langstone (2 seats)
Party	Candidate	Votes	%	±%
Conservative	Ray Mogford *	1,036		
Conservative	William Routley	913		
Liberal Democrats	Pam Bellew	292		
Liberal Democrats	David Hando	238		
Labour	Gareth Pratt	219		
Labour	Alan Speight	189		
Majority				
Turnout		2,887		
Conservative hold		Swing		
Conservative gain from		Swing		

=== Liswerry ===
Liswerry (4 seats)
Party	Candidate	Votes	%	±%
Labour	Ken Critchley *	1,106		
Labour	Roger Jeavons *	1,043		
Labour	John Richards *	874		
Independent	Allan Morris *	828		
Labour	Farzina Hussain	764		
Conservative	Carl Tucker	528		
Conservative	Nicholas Clark	492		
UKIP	James Peterson	461		
UKIP	Andrew Sterry	455		
Conservative	Dave Cox	452		
Conservative	Richard Hill	388		
UKIP	Patrina Smith	330		
Plaid Cymru	Cam Wixcey	198		
Majority				
Turnout		7,919		
Labour hold		Swing		
Labour gain from		Swing		
Labour gain from		Swing		
Independent gain from Labour		Swing		

=== Llanwern ===
Llanwern (1 seat)
Party	Candidate	Votes	%	±%
Conservative	Martyn Kellaway *	954		
Labour	John Davies	255		
Majority				
Turnout		1,209		
Conservative hold		Swing		

=== Malpas ===
Malpas (3 seats)
Party	Candidate	Votes	%	±%
Labour	Jane Mudd *	979		
Labour	James Clarke	937		
Labour	David Mayer *	914		
Conservative	Michael Brunnock	878		
Conservative	David Gapper-Hampson	699		
Conservative	Jim Hampson	673		
Newport Ind.	Jonathan Cocks	502		
Newport Ind.	Rachel Reaney	302		
Green	Pippa Bartolotti	283		
Newport Ind.	Gavin Phillips	283		
Green	Malcolm Degroot	161		
Liberal Democrats	Peter Davies	99		
Majority				
Turnout		6,710		
Labour gain from		Swing		
Labour hold		Swing		
Labour hold		Swing		

=== Marshfield ===
Marshfield (2 seats)
Party	Candidate	Votes	%	±%
Conservative	Richard White *	853		
Conservative	Tom Suller *	801		
Labour	Tony Boswell	491		
Labour	Ann Picton	437		
Liberal Democrats	Liz Newton	236		
Green	Lim Jones	188		
Majority				
Turnout		3,006		
Conservative hold		Swing		
Conservative hold		Swing		

=== Pillgwenlly ===
Pillgwenlly (2 seats)
Party	Candidate	Votes	%	±%
Labour	Ibrahim Hayat *	758		
Labour	Tracey Holyoake	757		
Independent	Omar Ali *	494		
Plaid Cymru	Khalilur Rahman	288		
Conservative	Zafar Ismail	238		
Conservative	Firdaus Asghar	205		
Plaid Cymru	Simon Coopey	197		
Majority				
Turnout		2,937		
Labour hold		Swing		
Labour hold		Swing		

Ali had been elected for Labour at a by-election in 2013.

=== Ringland ===
Ringland (3 seats)
Party	Candidate	Votes	%	±%
Labour	Malcolm Linton *	911		
Labour	Laura Lacey	703		
Labour	Rehmaan Hayat	613		
Newport Ind.	Rocky Davies	430		
Conservative	Christine Smith	405		
Newport Ind.	Ray Lord	386		
UKIP	Mike Ford	368		
Conservative	Muhammad Tariq	283		
Conservative	Saeed Zafar	210		
Liberal Democrats	Pierre l'Allier	106		
Majority				
Turnout		4,415		
Labour hold		Swing		
Labour gain from		Swing		
Labour hold		Swing		

=== Rogerstone ===
Rogerstone (3 seats)
Party	Candidate	Votes	%	±%
Conservative	Valerie Dudley	1,281		
Labour	Yvonne Forsey	1,258		
Newport Ind.	Chris Evans *	1,215		
Labour	Kath Hopkins	1,161		
Conservative	Dean Jenkins	1,111		
Labour	Sally Mlewa *	1,089		
Newport Ind.	Andrew Collingbourne	1,002		
Conservative	Ganesh Sukul	910		
Liberal Democrats	Susan Cocks	252		
Plaid Cymru	Anthony Salkeld	206		
Majority				
Turnout		9,485		
Conservative gain from Labour		Swing		
Labour gain from		Swing		
Newport Ind. gain from Labour		Swing		

Evans was elected for the Labour Party in 2012.

=== St Julians ===
St Julians (3 seats)
Party	Candidate	Votes	%	±%
Liberal Democrats	Carmel Townsend *	1,011		
Labour	Phil Hourahine	889		
Liberal Democrats	Holly Townsend *	825		
Labour	Roy McCabe	748		
Labour	Funmi Obilanade	700		
Liberal Democrats	Ryan Jones	654		
Conservative	Vicky Howells-Cook	453		
Conservative	Marie Jermyn	387		
Plaid Cymru	Chris Priest	250		
Majority				
Turnout		5,917		
Liberal Democrats gain from		Swing		
Labour gain from		Swing		
Liberal Democrats hold		Swing		

Townsend had been elected at a by-election in July 2016.

=== Shaftesbury ===
Shaftesbury (2 seats)
Party	Candidate	Votes	%	±%
Labour	Paul Cockeram *	619		
Labour	Herbie Thomas	560		
Conservative	Carol Bader	439		
Conservative	Michael Duncan	337		
Newport Ind.	David Rice	185		
UKIP	Joe Crocker	136		
Newport Ind.	Khushbir Bhullar	119		
Majority				
Turnout		2,395		
Labour hold		Swing		
Labour hold		Swing		

=== Stow Hill ===
Stow Hill (2 seats)
Party	Candidate	Votes	%	±%
Labour	Kate Thomas *	589		
Labour	Miqdad al-Nuaimi *	561		
Conservative	Luke Evetts	345		
Conservative	Nicolas Webb	326		
Newport Ind.	Tom Stanger	148		
Newport Ind.	David McLean	143		
Plaid Cymru	Rhys ab Elis	96		
Majority				
Turnout		2,208		
Labour gain from		Swing		
Labour gain from		Swing		

=== Tredegar Park ===
Tredegar Park (1 seat)
Party	Candidate	Votes	%	±%
Labour	Trevor Watkins *	295		
Conservative	Wayne Cresswell	257		
Newport Ind.	Jan Flanagan	197		
Plaid Cymru	Morgan Bowler-Brown	111		
Majority				
Turnout		860		
Labour gain from		Swing		

=== Victoria ===
Victoria (2 seats)
Party	Candidate	Votes	%	±%
Labour	Chris Jenkins *	840		
Labour	Majid Rahman *	795		
Conservative	Saima Mujahid	371		
Liberal Democrats	Mike Hamilton	344		
Conservative	Mubarak Ali	336		
Liberal Democrats	Jeff Evans	333		
Plaid Cymru	Trefor Puw	123		
Green	Mirka Virtanen	84		
Majority				
Turnout		3,226		
Labour gain from		Swing		
Labour gain from		Swing		

== By-elections ==
=== Graig ===
Graig: 26 August 2021
Party	Candidate	Votes	%	±%
Conservative	John Jones	610	50.2	+3.5
Labour	John Harris	534	44.0	+6.4
Liberal Democrats	Jeff Evans	71	5.8	−3.0
Majority		76	6.2	
Turnout		1,215	24.0	
Conservative hold		Swing	▼1.5	

=== Victoria ===
Victoria: 2 December 2021
Party	Candidate	Votes	%	±%
Labour	Gavin Horton	641	64.6	+6.7
Liberal Democrats	John Miller	258	26.0	+5.6
Conservative	Muhammad Tariq	93	9.4	−3.8
Majority		383	38.6	
Turnout		992	18.7	
Labour hold		Swing	▲0.6	
