= 2012 Newport City Council election =

2012 Welsh local government election

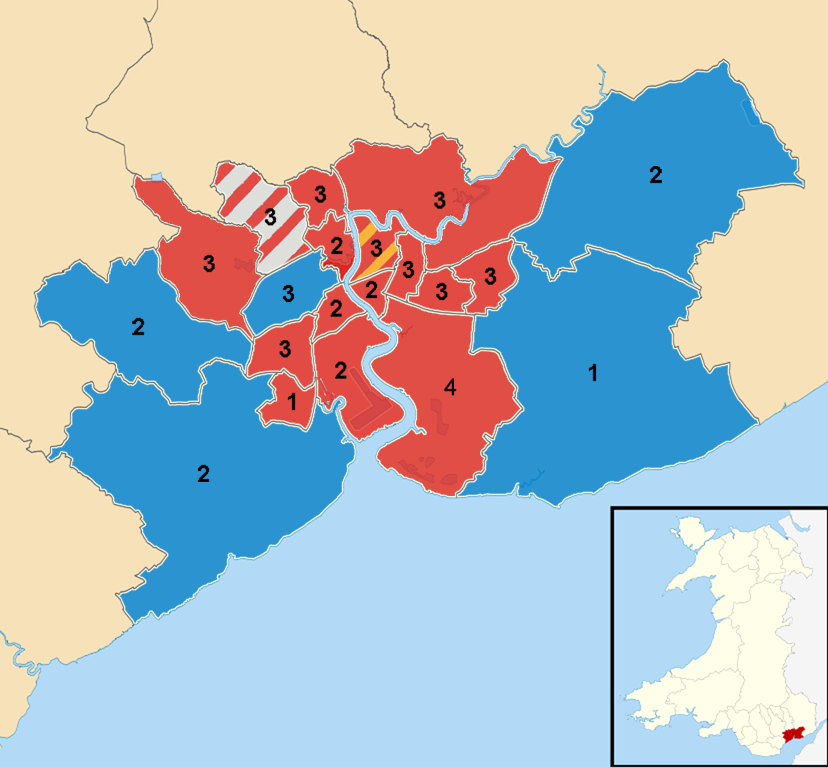
2012 election results map, showing numbers of councillors per ward and their party affiliations

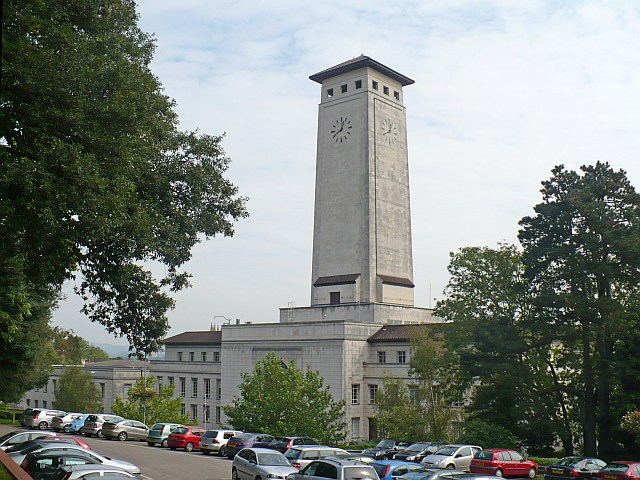
Newport Civic Centre

2012 Elections to Newport City Council were held on 3 May 2012 along with elections to the other 21 local authorities in Wales, community council elections in Wales and 2012 United Kingdom local elections.

Councillors elected in this election served an extended five-year term, after local government minister Carl Sargeant announced the next elections would be moved from 2016 to 2017 to avoid clashing with the 2016 National Assembly for Wales election which in turn had been delayed a year to avoid clashing with the 2015 United Kingdom general election.

The previous election took place on 1 May 2008.

The next full election took place on 3 May 2017.

== Election results: overview ==
Newport City Council election 2012
Party	Seats	Gains	Losses	Net gain/loss	Seats %	Votes %	Votes	+/−
Labour	37			+15	74.0	48.2	17,870	+14.9
Conservative	10			-7	20.0	28.7	10,642	-6.6
Liberal Democrats	1			-8	2.0	13.0	4,823	-8.8
Independent	2			+1	4.0	4.8	1,764	+2.4
Plaid Cymru	0			-1	0.0	4.1	1,517	-3.1
Green	0			0	0.0	0.7	274	New
Welsh Christian	0			0	0.0	0.4	158	New
Total	50						37,048	

- The Independent statistics are for all Independents, whether they are members of the Independent group on the council or not.

== Ward results ==
Asterisks denote incumbent Councillors seeking re-election. Vote share changes compared with corresponding 2008 election.

=== Allt-yr-yn ===
Allt-yr-yn (3 seats)
Party	Candidate	Votes	%	±%
Labour	Michael Allen	942	11.90%	
Labour	Jan Atkinson	916	11.57%	
Independent	Laura Buchanan-Smith	755	9.54%	
Labour	Pat Drewett	843	10.65%	
Plaid Cymru	Robert Edwards	236	2.98%	
Conservative	Matthew Evans*	1,364	17.24%	−7.05%
Conservative	Charles Ferris	1,273	16.09%	
Conservative	David Fouweather*	1,339	16.92%	−7.12%
Liberal Democrats	Megan Rees-Webb	246	3.10%	−2.39%
Majority				
Turnout		7,914		
Conservative hold		Swing		
Conservative hold		Swing		
Conservative hold		Swing		

=== Alway ===
Alway (3 seats)
Party	Candidate	Votes	%	±%
Conservative	Dave Gapper-Hampson	292	7.14%	
Labour	John Guy*	1,103	26.97%	+9.58%
Labour	Debbie Harvey	1,021	24.97%	
Conservative	Andrew Hill	314	7.68%	
Labour	Ray Truman*	1,140	27.88%	+10.07%
Liberal Democrats	Shihab Uddin	219	5.36%	
Majority				
Turnout		4,089		
Labour hold		Swing		
Labour hold		Swing		
Labour hold		Swing		

=== Beechwood ===
Beechwood (3 seats)
Party	Candidate	Votes	%	±%
Conservative	Javid Ahmed	172	3.06%	
Liberal Democrats	Hugh Clarke*	806	14.32%	
Labour	Deb Davies	950	16.87%	
Liberal Democrats	Jeff Evans*	765	13.59%	
Liberal Democrats	David Hando*	805	14.30%	
Labour	Paul Hannon	912	16.20%	
Conservative	Pat Harris	185	3.29%	
Conservative	Omer Mian	134	2.38%	
Labour	Mark Spencer	901	16.00%	
Majority				
Turnout		5,630		
Labour gain from Liberal Democrats		Swing		
Labour gain from Liberal Democrats		Swing		
Labour gain from Liberal Democrats		Swing		

=== Bettws ===
Bettws (3 seats)
Party	Candidate	Votes	%	±%
Independent	Susan Baker	534	13.01%	
Labour	Val Delahaye*	616	15.01%	
Labour	Kieron Dineen	594	14.47%	
Welsh Christian	John Harrold	158	3.85%	
Labour	Glyn Jarvis*	584	14.23%	
Independent	Noel Trigg*	840	20.46%	
Independent	Kevin Whitehead	779	18.98%	
Majority				
Turnout		4,105		
Labour hold		Swing		
Independent gain from Labour		Swing		
Independent gain from Labour		Swing		

- Noel Trigg was elected as an independent candidate, having previously been elected as a Labour candidate in the 5 June 2008 by-election.

=== Caerleon ===
Caerleon (3 seats)
Party	Candidate	Votes	%	±%
Labour	Gail Giles*	1,582	21.79%	
Liberal Democrats	Theresa Hughes	300	4.13%	
Labour	Paul Huntley	1,346	18.54%	
Conservative	Angela Jones*	1,074	14.79%	
Conservative	Edward Saville	743	10.23%	
Labour	Cliff Suller	1,342	18.48%	
Conservative	Joan Watkins	874	12.04%	
Majority				
Turnout		7,261		
Labour gain from Conservative		Swing		
Labour hold		Swing		
Labour gain from Conservative		Swing		

=== Gaer ===
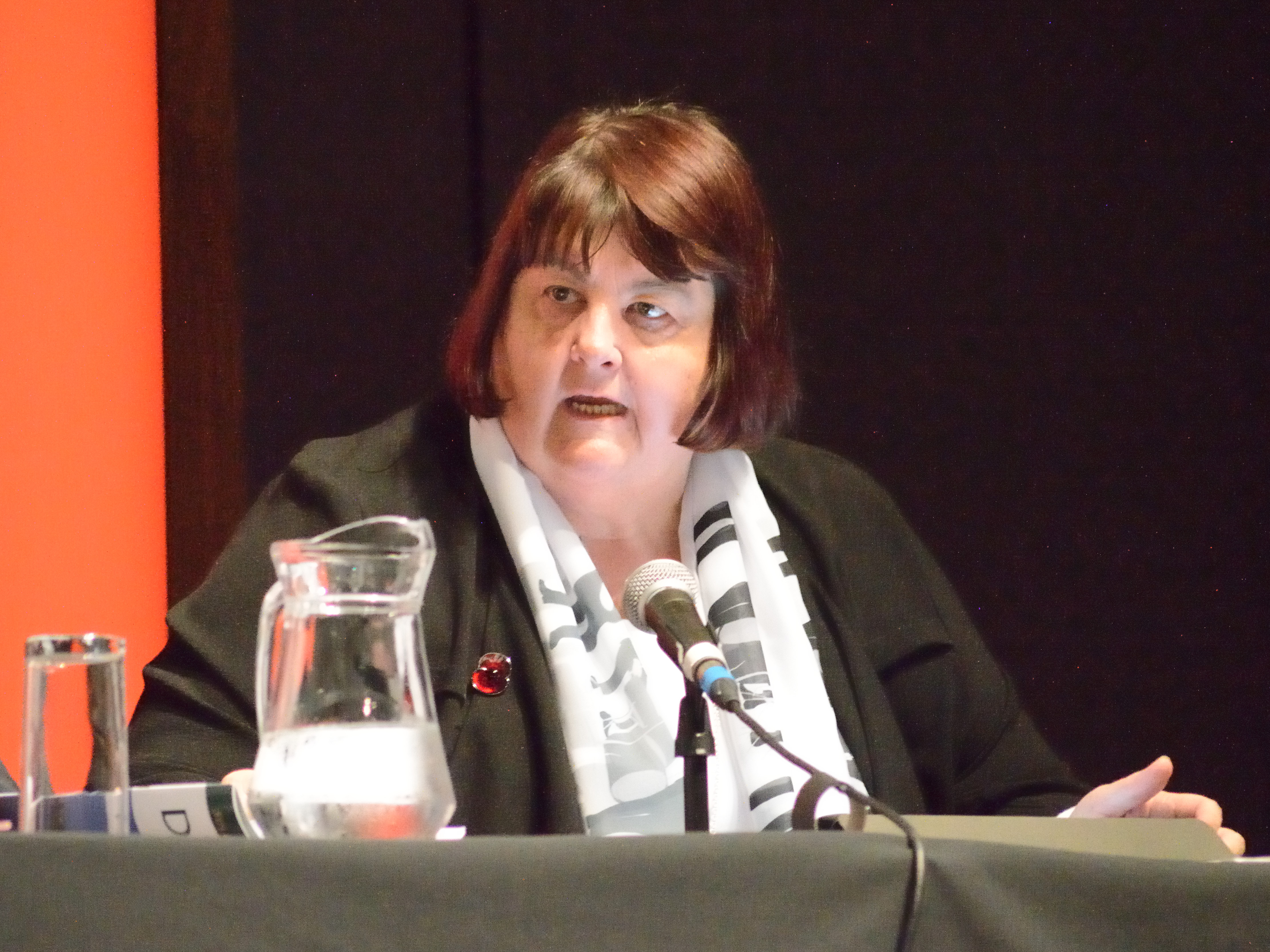
Debbie Wilcox, Newport City Council leader since 2016

Gaer (3 seats)
Party	Candidate	Votes	%	±%
Conservative	Anthony Bird	473	9.09%	
Plaid Cymru	Clive Busson	238	4.57%	
Conservative	Amanda Butler	486	9.34%	
Liberal Democrats	Susan Davies	156	3.00%	
Conservative	Jackie Johnson	463	8.90%	
Labour	Herbie Thomas	1,135	21.81%	
Labour	Mark Whitcutt	1,152	22.14%	
Labour	Debbie Wilcox	1,101	21.16%	
Majority				
Turnout		5,204		
Labour gain from		Swing		
Labour hold		Swing		
Labour gain from		Swing		

=== Graig ===
Graig (2 seats)
Party	Candidate	Votes	%	±%
Conservative	Margaret Cornelious*	902	28.42%	
Labour	Victoria Ann Cox-Wall	718	22.62%	
Liberal Democrats	Norman Mountain	169	5.32%	
Labour	Sarah Osolinski	580	18.27%	
Conservative	David Williams*	805	25.36%	
Majority				
Turnout		3,174		
Conservative hold		Swing		
Conservative hold		Swing		

=== Langstone ===
Langstone (2 seats)
Party	Candidate	Votes	%	±%
Conservative	David Atwell*	839	34.44%	
Labour	Nicholas Boyd	300	12.32%	
Labour	John Davies	355	14.57%	
Liberal Democrats	Linda Davies	175	7.18%	
Conservative	Ray Mogford	767	31.49%	
Majority				
Turnout		2,436		
Conservative hold		Swing		
Conservative gain from Independent		Swing		

=== Llanwern ===
Llanwern
Party	Candidate	Votes	%	±%
Liberal Democrats	Paul Bevan	26	2.95%	
Labour	Chris Herriot	269	30.50%	
Conservative	Martyn Kellway*	587	66.55%	+14.38%
Majority		318	36.05%	+21.92%
Turnout		882		
Conservative hold		Swing		

=== Lliswerry ===
Lliswerry (4 seats)
Party	Candidate	Votes	%	±%
Labour	Ken Critchley*	1,506	18.78%	
Labour	Roger Jeavons*	1,469	18.31%	
Conservative	Heather Lee	561	6.99%	
Labour	Allan Morris*	1,479	18.44%	
Labour	John Richards*	1,326	16.53%	
Conservative	Lewis Routley	573	7.14%	
Conservative	Carl Tucker	559	6.97%	
Conservative	Richard Weller	548	6.83%	
Majority				
Turnout		8,021		
Labour hold		Swing		
Labour hold		Swing		
Labour hold		Swing		
Labour hold		Swing		

=== Malpas ===
Malpas (3 seats)
Party	Candidate	Votes	%	±%
Green	Philip Anderson	217	3.43%	
Conservative	Carol Anne Bader	663	10.48%	
Green	Pippa Bartolotti	274	4.33%	
Conservative	John Bird*	658	10.40%	
Green	Malcolm Degroot	195	3.08%	
Labour	Christine Maxfield	1,194	18.87%	
Labour	David Mayer*	1,227	19.39%	
Conservative	Peter Meredith	667	10.54%	
Labour	Jane Mudd	1,232	19.47%	
Majority				
Turnout		6,327		
Labour gain from Conservative		Swing		
Labour hold		Swing		
Labour hold		Swing		

=== Marshfield ===
Marshfield (2 seats)
Party	Candidate	Votes	%	±%
Liberal Democrats	Andrew Bailey	274	9.42%	
Plaid Cymru	Keith Bennet	173	5.95%	
Labour	Stephen Marshall	413	14.20%	
Liberal Democrats	Liz Newton	335	11.52%	
Labour	Mark Price	326	11.21%	
Conservative	Tom Suller	672	23.11%	
Conservative	Richard White	715	24.59%	
Majority				
Turnout		2,908		
Conservative hold		Swing		
Conservative hold		Swing		

=== Pillgwenlly ===
Pillgwenlly (2 seats)
Party	Candidate	Votes	%	±%
Liberal Democrats	Mustafa Ali	150	6.63%	
Labour	Ibrahim Hayat*	703	31.06%	
Conservative	Zafar Peavez Ismail	306	13.52%	
Labour	Ron Jones*	756	33.41%	
Liberal Democrats	Sofique Miah	71	3.14%	
Plaid Cymru	Khalilur Rahman	277	12.24%	
Majority				
Turnout		2,263		
Labour hold		Swing		
Labour hold		Swing		

=== Ringland ===
Ringland (3 seats)
Party	Candidate	Votes	%	±%
Liberal Democrats	Mofiz Ali	304	6.45%	
Labour	Bob Bright*	1046	22.21%	
Labour	Emma Corten	1,097	23.29%	
Liberal Democrats	Paul Jordan	514	10.91%	
Labour	Malcolm Linton*	1,090	23.14%	
Liberal Democrats	Ray Lord	446	9.47%	
Conservative	Ruth Williams	213	4.52%	
Majority				
Turnout		4,710		
Labour hold		Swing		
Labour gain from Liberal Democrats		Swing		
Labour hold		Swing		

=== Rogerstone ===
Rogerstone (3 seats)
Party	Candidate	Votes	%	±%
Labour	Tom Bond	1,495	17.41%	
Liberal Democrats	Peter Davies	248	2.89%	
Conservative	Valerie Dudley*	1216	14.16%	
Labour	Chris Evans	1,623	18.90%	
Plaid Cymru	David Hall	231	2.69%	
Conservative	Stephen Jones*	1,213	14.12%	
Conservative	Alan Mazey	1,075	12.52%	
Labour	Sally Mlewa	1,487	17.31%	
Majority				
Turnout		8,588		
Labour gain from Conservative		Swing		
Labour gain from Conservative		Swing		
Labour gain from Conservative		Swing		

=== Shaftesbury ===
Shaftesbury (2 seats)
Party	Candidate	Votes	%	±%
Labour	Paul Cockeram*	586	28.16%	
Conservative	Jay Hampson	151	7.26%	
Conservative	Anselm Plummer	136	6.54%	
Labour	Bob Poole*	620	29.79%	
Independent	Louise Ryan	169	8.12%	
Independent	Michael Ryan	168	8.07%	
Plaid Cymru	Anthony Salkeld	124	5.96%	
Plaid Cymru	Maria Shellard	127	6.10%	
Majority				
Turnout		2,081		
Labour hold		Swing		
Labour hold		Swing		

=== St.Julians ===
St.Julians (3 seats)
Party	Candidate	Votes	%	±%
Liberal Democrats	Gill Ford*	863	13.36%	
Labour	Emma Garland	1,020	15.79%	
Conservative	Vikky Howells	299	4.63%	
Labour	Rhys Hutchings	981	15.19%	
Conservative	Marie Jermyn	243	3.76%	
Conservative	Roy Lane	266	4.12%	
Liberal Democrats	Carmel Townsend*	873	13.51%	
Liberal Democrats	Ed Townsend*	958	14.83%	
Labour	Joshua Worrad	957	14.81%	
Majority				
Turnout		6,460		
Labour gain from Liberal Democrats		Swing		
Labour gain from Liberal Democrats		Swing		
Liberal Democrats hold		Swing		

=== Stow Hill ===
Stow Hill (2 seats)
Party	Candidate	Votes	%	±%
Plaid Cymru	Rhys Gwyn Ab Elis	79	3.91%	
Labour	Miqdad Al-Nuaimi	527	26.05%	
Liberal Democrats	Pam Baulch	62	3.06%	
Conservative	Peter Hugh Charles Davies*	383	18.93%	
Conservative	William J Routley*	374	18.49%	
Labour	Kate Thomas	598	29.56%	
Majority				
Turnout		2,023		
Labour gain from Conservative		Swing		
Labour gain from Conservative		Swing		

=== Tredegar Park ===
Tredegar Park
Party	Candidate	Votes	%	±%
Liberal Democrats	Andrew Sherwood	41	5.88%	
Conservative	Adam Wate	144	20.66%	
Labour	Trevor Watkins	512	73.46%	
Majority		368	52.80%	+44.39%
Turnout		697		
Labour gain from Plaid Cymru		Swing		

=== Victoria ===
Victoria (2 seats)
Party	Candidate	Votes	%	±%
Liberal Democrats	Mike Hamilton*	418	14.57%	
Liberal Democrats	Mozadul Hussain*	345	12.03%	
Labour	Chris Jenkins	769	26.81%	
Conservative	Khurram Khan	174	6.07%	
Conservative	Bilal Meah	224	7.81%	
Plaid Cymru	Christopher Paul	156	5.44%	
Plaid Cymru	Trefor Puw	108	3.77%	
Labour	Majid Rahman	674	23.50%	
Majority				
Turnout		2,868		
Labour gain from Liberal Democrats		Swing		
Labour gain from Liberal Democrats		Swing		
