= 2008 Newport City Council election =

2008 Welsh local government election

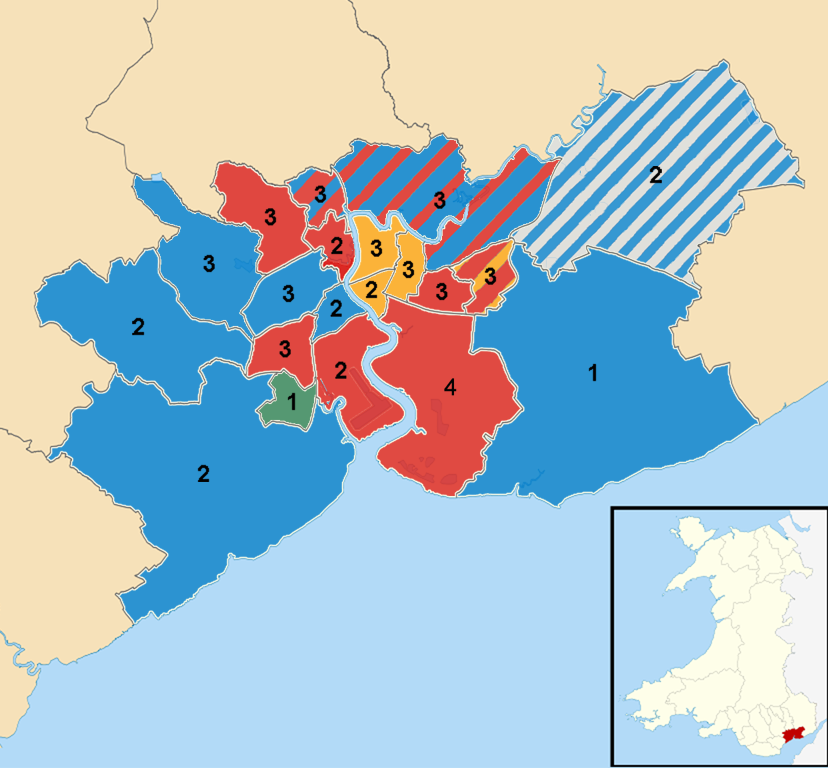
2008 election results map, showing numbers of councillors per ward and their party affiliations

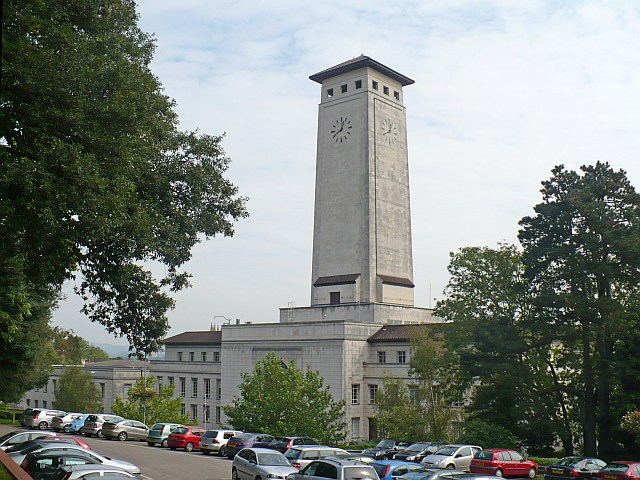
Newport Civic Centre

2008 elections to Newport City Council were held on 1 May 2008 along with elections to the other 21 local authorities in Wales, community council elections in Wales and 2008 United Kingdom local elections.

Councillors elected in this election served a four-year term.

The previous election took place in 2004.

The next full election took place on 3 May 2012.

== Election results: overview ==
Newport Council election 2008
Party	Seats	Gains	Losses	Net gain/loss	Seats %	Votes %	Votes	+/−
Labour	22			-9	44.0	33.3	13,884	-2.9
Conservative	17			+6	34.0	35.0	14,705	+8.4
Liberal Democrats	9			+3	18.0	21.8	9,066	+0.6
Plaid Cymru	1			0	2.0	7.2	2,980	-1.6
Independent	1			0	2.0	2.4	1,005	+2.4
Total	50						41,640	

- The Independent statistics are for all Independents, whether they are members of the Independent group on the council or not.

== Ward results ==
=== Allt-yr-yn ===
Allt-yr-yn (3 seats)
Party	Candidate	Votes	%	±%
Conservative	Matthew Evans	1,818		
Conservative	David Fouweather	1,800		
Conservative	Leslie Knight	1,622		
Labour	Fabi Berrettoni	722		
Liberal Democrats	Phil Bennett	420		
Liberal Democrats	Megan Rees Webb	411		
Liberal Democrats	Adrian Summers	369		
Plaid Cymru	Mian Rashid	324		
Majority				
Turnout		7,486		
Conservative hold		Swing		
Conservative hold		Swing		
Conservative hold		Swing		

=== Alway ===
Alway (3 seats)
Party	Candidate	Votes	%	±%
Labour	Raymond Truman	795		
Labour	John Guy	776		
Labour	Ken Powell	775		
Conservative	Sarah Jones	434		
Conservative	Sallie Mogford	431		
Liberal Democrats	Anne Parry	348		
Liberal Democrats	Terry Baulch	344		
Liberal Democrats	Linda Davies	309		
Plaid Cymru	Nagma Arshid	251		
Majority				
Turnout		4,463		
Labour hold		Swing		
Labour hold		Swing		
Labour hold		Swing		

=== Beechwood ===
Beechwood (3 seats)
Party	Candidate	Votes	%	±%
Liberal Democrats	Hugh Clarke	1,433		
Liberal Democrats	David Hando	1,321		
Liberal Democrats	Jeff Evans	1,288		
Labour	David Collins	484		
Labour	Christopher Evans	399		
Labour	Alan Jones	373		
Conservative	David Hildred	220		
Conservative	Kenneth Cornelious	204		
Independent	Tony Lane	202		
Conservative	Ruth Williams	187		
Majority				
Turnout		6,510		
Liberal Democrats gain from		Swing		
Liberal Democrats gain from		Swing		
Liberal Democrats gain from		Swing		

=== Bettws ===
Bettws (3 seats)
Party	Candidate	Votes	%	±%
Labour	Noel Trigg	1,128		
Labour	Val Delahaye	890		
Labour	Glyn Jarvis	789		
Liberal Democrats	Susan Baker	586		
Liberal Democrats	Ann Tripp	451		
Liberal Democrats	David Gapper	408		
Conservative	Michael Ryan	331		
Conservative	Debbie Blackbird	260		
Plaid Cymru	Firdaus Asghar	75		
Independent	Vince Marenghi	50		
Plaid Cymru	David Hall	49		
Independent	Stephen Chomyn	40		
Majority				
Turnout		5,057		
Labour hold		Swing		
Labour gain from		Swing		
Labour gain from		Swing		

=== Caerleon ===
Caerleon (3 seats)
Party	Candidate	Votes	%	±%
Conservative	Angela Jones	1,324		
Conservative	Charles Ferris	1,216		
Labour	Gail Giles	1,181		
Conservative	Naomi Macey	1,178		
Labour	Cliff Suller	1,094		
Labour	Paul Huntley	1,087		
Liberal Democrats	Theresa Hughes	467		
Liberal Democrats	Peter Davies	308		
Liberal Democrats	Pam Baulch	306		
Majority				
Turnout		8,161		
Conservative gain from Labour		Swing		
Conservative hold		Swing		
Labour gain from		Swing		

=== Gaer ===
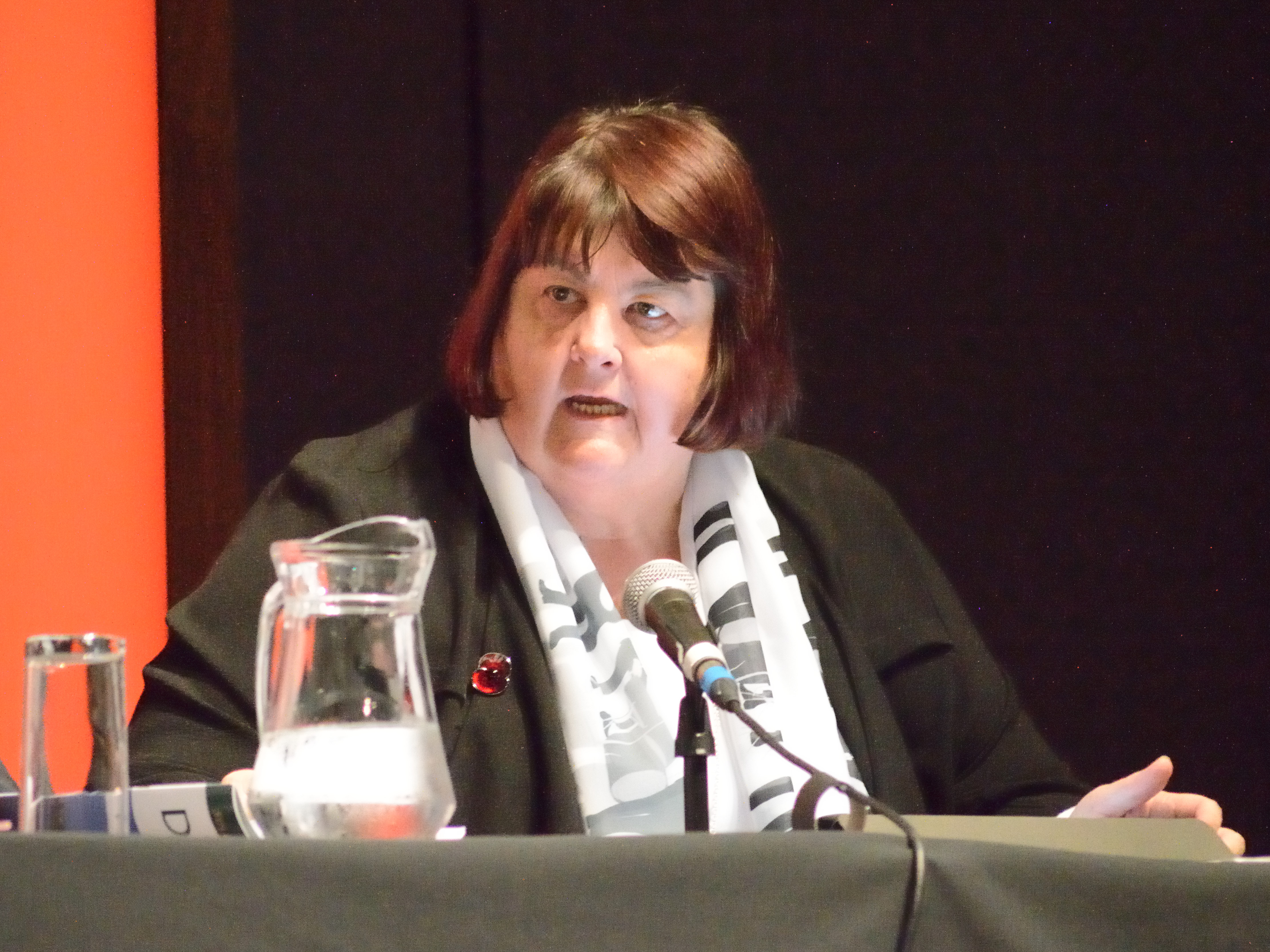
Debbie Wilcox, Newport City Council leader since 2016

Gaer (3 seats)
Party	Candidate	Votes	%	±%
Labour	Mark Whitcutt	921		
Labour	Herbert Thomas	883		
Labour	Deborah Wilcox	847		
Conservative	Adam Wate	813		
Conservative	Michael Wisniewski	752		
Liberal Democrats	John Gibbon	405		
Liberal Democrats	Michael Evans	377		
Liberal Democrats	Mark Wheeldon	333		
Plaid Cymru	Danielle Bennett	258		
Majority				
Turnout		5,589		
Labour gain from		Swing		
Labour hold		Swing		
Labour gain from		Swing		

=== Graig ===
Graig (2 seats)
Party	Candidate	Votes	%	±%
Conservative	Margaret Cornelious	1,187		
Conservative	David Williams	1,070		
Labour	Andrew Sayer	589		
Liberal Democrats	Sandra Flanagan	317		
Liberal Democrats	Norman Mountain	241		
Majority				
Turnout		3,404		
Conservative hold		Swing		
Conservative hold		Swing		

=== Langstone ===
Langstone (2 seats)
Party	Candidate	Votes	%	±%
Conservative	David Atwell	833		
Independent	Simon Lane	753		
Conservative	Carole Atwell	615		
Liberal Democrats	Ynys Edwards	303		
Liberal Democrats	Linda Perry	296		
Labour	Deborah Harvey	138		
Plaid Cymru	Timothy Harvey	114		
Majority				
Turnout		3,052		
Conservative hold		Swing		
Independent gain from Conservative		Swing		

=== Liswerry ===
Liswerry (4 seats)
Party	Candidate	Votes	%	±%
Labour	Ken Critchley	1,018		
Labour	Allan Morris	982		
Labour	John Richards	879		
Labour	Andrew Jeavons	972		
Conservative	Chris Blight	728		
Conservative	Greg Waters	683		
Conservative	John Ferrier	644		
Liberal Democrats	Lisa Berry	419		
Liberal Democrats	Martin Price	328		
Liberal Democrats	Oliver Townsend	326		
Liberal Democrats	Tomas Forsey	270		
Majority				
Turnout		7,249		
Labour hold		Swing		
Labour gain from		Swing		
Labour gain from		Swing		
Labour gain from		Swing		

=== Llanwern ===
Llanwern (1 seat)
Party	Candidate	Votes	%	±%
Conservative	Martyn Kellaway	491		
Labour	Ian Jones	358		
Liberal Democrats	Stuart Bull	92		
Majority				
Turnout		941		
Conservative hold		Swing		

=== Malpas ===
Malpas (3 seats)
Party	Candidate	Votes	%	±%
Labour	Bill Langsford	1,243		
Labour	David Mayer	1,137		
Conservative	John Bird	1,131		
Conservative	Ian Brown	1,074		
Labour	Peter Davies	1,064		
Conservative	Peter Meredith	602		
Liberal Democrats	Susan Davies	385		
Majority				
Turnout		6,636		
Labour gain from		Swing		
Labour hold		Swing		
Conservative hold		Swing		

=== Marshfield ===
Marshfield (2 seats)
Party	Candidate	Votes	%	±%
Conservative	Richard White	974		
Conservative	Tom Suller	952		
Labour	Neil Todd	332		
Labour	Alan Speight	283		
Liberal Democrats	Helena Wheeldon	170		
Plaid Cymru	Susan Bennett	162		
Liberal Democrats	Paul Bevan	162		
Majority				
Turnout		3,034		
Conservative hold		Swing		
Conservative hold		Swing		

=== Pillgwenlly ===
Pillgwenlly (2 seats)
Party	Candidate	Votes	%	±%
Labour	Ibrahim Hayat	466		
Labour	Ron Jones	464		
Conservative	Tony Ismail	377		
Plaid Cymru	Khalilur Rahman	375		
Plaid Cymru	Anthony Salkeld	346		
Liberal Democrats	Jayne Lewis	498		
Conservative	David Madden	327		
Liberal Democrats	Sofique Miah	278		
Majority				
Turnout		2,964		
Labour hold		Swing		
Labour hold		Swing		

=== Ringland ===
Ringland (3 seats)
Party	Candidate	Votes	%	±%
Liberal Democrats	John Fortey	939		
Labour	Bob Bright	874		
Labour	Malcolm Linton	871		
Liberal Democrats	Paul Jordan	858		
Liberal Democrats	Patricia Harris	841		
Labour	Tony Gray	783		
Conservative	Tina Evans	264		
Conservative	Jane Mazey	225		
Plaid Cymru	Keith Bennett	175		
Majority				
Turnout		5,830		
Liberal Democrats hold		Swing		
Labour gain from		Swing		
Labour hold		Swing		

=== Rogerstone ===
Rogerstone (3 seats)
Party	Candidate	Votes	%	±%
Conservative	Valerie Dudley	1,664		
Conservative	Stephen Jones	1,576		
Conservative	Andrew Cooksey	1,507		
Labour	Edward Burke	1,450		
Labour	Jayne Bryant	1,349		
Labour	Victoria Colley Wall	1,136		
Liberal Democrats	Paul Angeli	387		
Plaid Cymru	David Hall	325		
Liberal Democrats	Jason Sullivan	309		
Liberal Democrats	Maurice Bacon	258		
Majority				
Turnout		9,961		
Conservative gain from Labour		Swing		
Conservative gain from Labour		Swing		
Conservative gain from		Swing		

=== St Julians ===
St.Julians (3 seats)
Party	Candidate	Votes	%	±%
Liberal Democrats	Ed Townsend	1,148		
Liberal Democrats	Carmel Townsend	1,029		
Liberal Democrats	Gill Ford	985		
Conservative	Chris Blight	581		
Conservative	Roy Lane	552		
Conservative	Dale Hardman	542		
Labour	Ken Goodger	492		
Labour	Kenneth Chandler	467		
Labour	Anthony Jermyn	432		
Plaid Cymru	James Priest	111		
Majority				
Turnout		6,139		
Liberal Democrats gain from		Swing		
Liberal Democrats gain from		Swing		
Liberal Democrats hold		Swing		

=== Shaftesbury ===
Shaftesbury (2 seats)
Party	Candidate	Votes	%	±%
Labour	Bob Poole	478		
Labour	Paul Cockeram	468		
Conservative	Mike Ryan	429		
Conservative	James Hampson	376		
Liberal Democrats	Julia Varley	178		
Plaid Cymru	Jonathan Clark	167		
Liberal Democrats	Bob Davies	139		
Plaid Cymru	Omer Williams	113		
Majority				
Turnout		2,348		
Labour hold		Swing		
Labour hold		Swing		

=== Stow Hill ===
Stow Hill (2 seats)
Party	Candidate	Votes	%	±%
Conservative	Peter Davies	723		
Conservative	William Routley	616		
Labour	Miqdad al-Nuaimi	436		
Labour	Fern Foster	418		
Plaid Cymru	Rhys ab Elis	91		
Liberal Democrats	Nigel Flanagan	86		
Liberal Democrats	Winifred Lee	72		
Plaid Cymru	Shereen Williams	7		
Majority				
Turnout		2,449		
Conservative gain from		Swing		
Conservative gain from Labour		Swing		

=== Tredegar Park ===
Tredegar Park (1 seat)
Party	Candidate	Votes	%	±%
Plaid Cymru	James Brunnock	364		
Labour	Trevor Watkins	293		
Conservative	Gerry Coldham	152		
Liberal Democrats	Andrew Bailey	35		
Majority		71		N/A
Turnout		844		
Plaid Cymru gain from Labour		Swing		

=== Victoria ===
Victoria (2 seats)
Party	Candidate	Votes	%	±%
Liberal Democrats	Mike Hamilton	618		
Liberal Democrats	Mozadul Hussain	604		
Labour	Chris Jenkins	486		
Labour	Deb Davies	450		
Plaid Cymru	Firdaus Asghar	413		
Conservative	David Cox	231		
Plaid Cymru	Trefor Puw	197		
Majority				
Turnout		2,999		
Liberal Democrats gain from Plaid Cymru		Swing		
Liberal Democrats gain from Labour		Swing		
