= Political party affiliation in the United Kingdom =

Membership and affiliation within political parties in the United Kingdom are governed by various eligibility criteria and behavioural expectations. Most parties restrict membership to individuals who meet age and citizenship requirements, share the party's core principles, and agree to abide by its constitution and rules. Members are typically prohibited from joining or supporting rival political organisations or from standing against officially endorsed candidates.

Some parties offer forms of associate or supporter status, which allow limited participation without the obligations of full membership. Whilst these rules help preserve party integrity and cohesion, they also define the extent to which individuals can engage with political life in the UK. Supporters without formal membership may contribute to campaigning or fundraising, but generally have fewer rights in internal decision-making or leadership elections.

== History ==
Membership of political parties has been in decline in the UK since the 1950s, falling by over 65% from 1983 (4 per cent of the electorate) to 2005 (1.3 per cent). In 2022, 1.5% of the British electorate were members of the Conservative Party, Labour Party, or the Liberal Democrats. Typically party affiliation allows an individual to support only a single party. Two notable exceptions to this are: the Co-operative Party which permits its members to also have membership of the Labour Party and the Social Democratic and Labour Party (SDLP); and the Scottish National Party, which permits membership of Plaid Cymru.

According to the UK Parliament website sourced from a report by Olympic Britain, during the 1950s there were 2.8 million members of the Conservative Party and 1 million Labour Party members. From 1945 until the early 1990s, supporters of the Socialist and Cooperative parties and trade unions linked with the Labour Party increased the overall Labour Party movement by 5 to 6 million, from which point they began to fall and currently number about 3.5 million.

Despite being founded in 1900, the Labour Party did not begin keeping track of its membership until 1928. The Conservative Party rarely releases their total membership statistics. There are no clear membership statistics for the Conservative Party before 1945. It is estimated that between World War I and World War II, membership levels were around 1.5 million. Exact numbers are unknown. As of March 2026, the sum of membership numbers of UK political parties stands at ~1.25m members, or roughly 2.6% of the electorate.

== Graphical summary ==
- Reform UK
- Labour Party
- Green Party
- Restore Britain
- Conservative Party
- Liberal Democrats
- Scottish National Party
- Your Party
- Advance UK

The charts below show how political party affiliation has varied in previous years, the parties shown currently have greater than 10,000 members reported since the start of 2025, or had over 25,000 members historically.

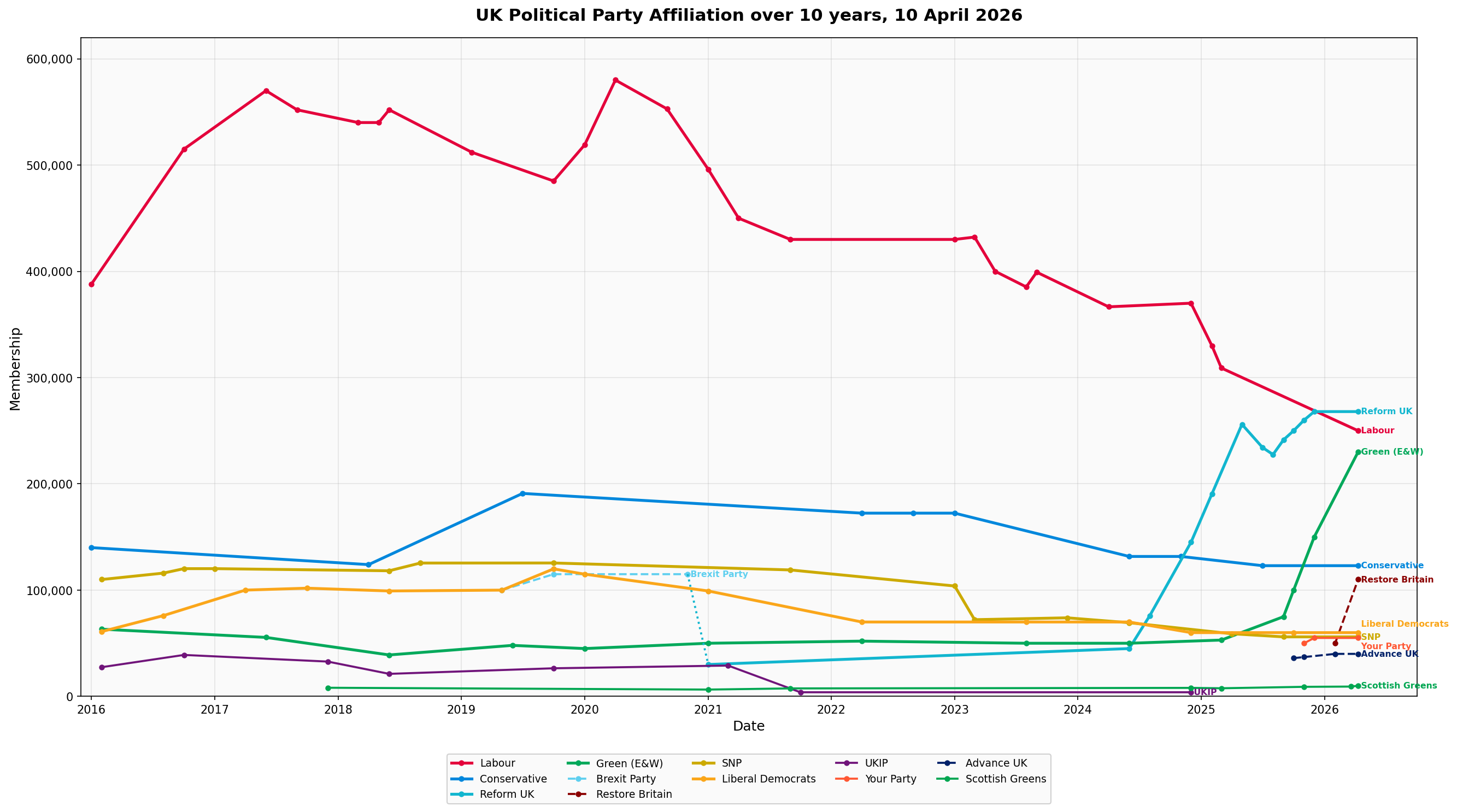
UK Political Party Affiliation over 10 years

The chart below shows how party affiliation has varied since the 2024 United Kingdom general election, with the end of the graph on the right reflecting when the next general election can last be held.

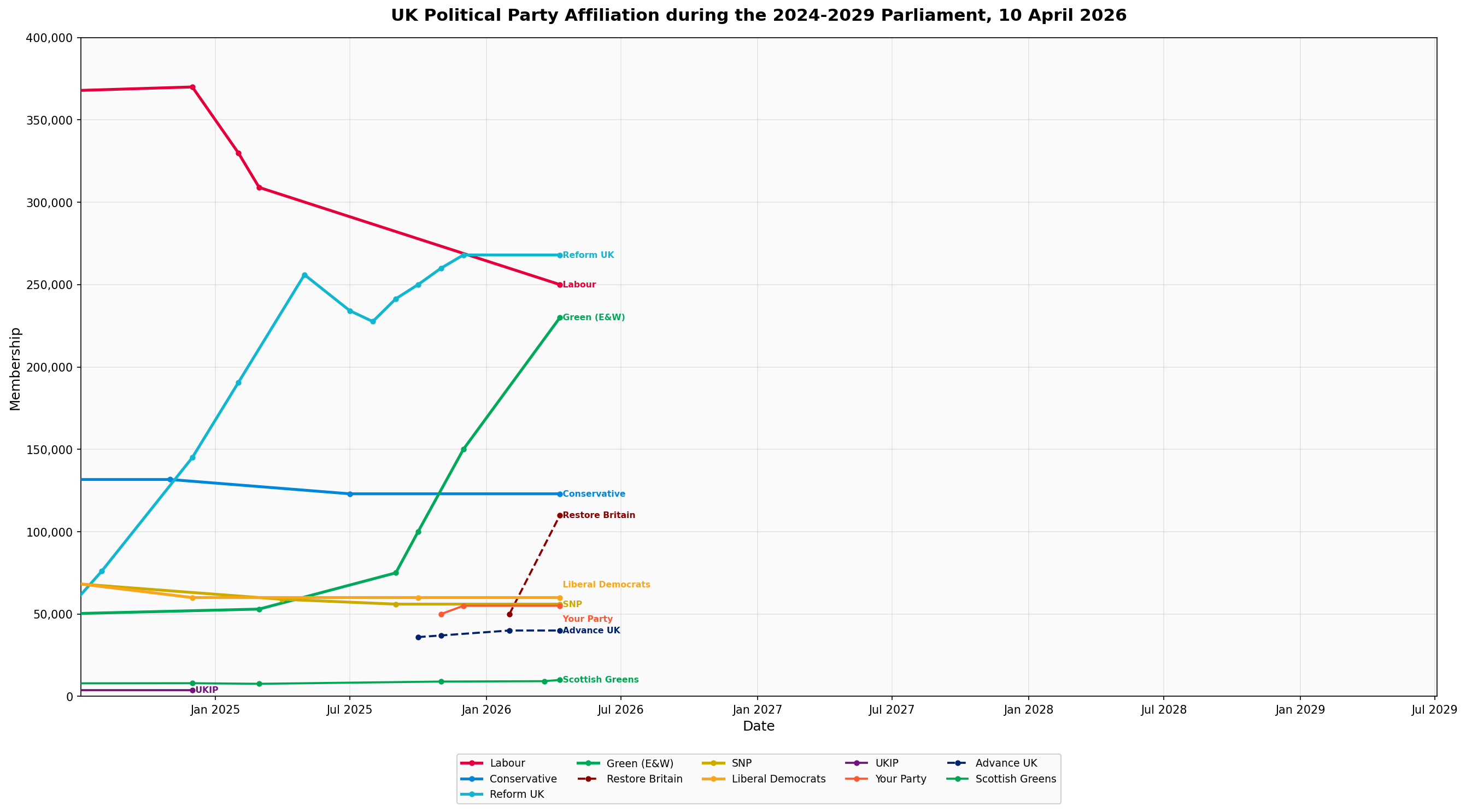
UK Political Party Affiliation - 2024 Parliament

== Current membership ==
Party	Current membership	Date	Region
Reform UK	268,000	12 December 2025	United Kingdom
Labour Party	264,754	31 December 2025	United Kingdom
Green Party of England and Wales	230,000+	7 May 2026	England and Wales
Restore Britain	130,000	16 June 2026	United Kingdom
Conservative Party	123,000	July 2025 (date reported)	United Kingdom
Liberal Democrats	60,000	9 October 2025	United Kingdom
Your Party	55,000	29 November 2025	United Kingdom
Scottish National Party (SNP)	51,000	December 2025	Scotland
Co-operative Party	13,430	31 December 2024	United Kingdom
Scottish Greens	10,000	5 December 2025	Scotland
Sinn Féin	10,000	September 2024	Northern Ireland
Plaid Cymru	c.10,000	2024	Wales
Workers Party of Britain	7,469	January 2025	Great Britain
Social Democratic Party (SDP)	c.3,400	31 December 2024	United Kingdom
Socialist Workers Party	2,504	2023	Great Britain
English Democrats	2,500	2015	England
Homeland Party	1,300	19 May 2025	United Kingdom
Communist Party of Britain (CPB)	1,270	20 August 2025	Great Britain
Gwlad	645	March 2025	Wales
Official Monster Raving Loony Party	457	31 December 2024	United Kingdom
National Liberal Party	321	2024	Great Britain
Socialist Party of Great Britain	300	2023	Great Britain
Volt UK	282	2026	Great Britain

=== Labour Party ===
In the Labour Party's 2020 leadership election 490,731 people voted, of whom 401,564 (81.8%) were full members, 76,161 (15.5%) had affiliated membership and 13,006 (2.6%) were registered supporters. The registered supporter class was abolished in 2021.

In 2025, the Labour Party's membership was recorded as 264,754.

=== Conservative Party ===
The Conservative Party's membership was revealed as 131,680 at the end of the 2024 Conservative Party leadership election.

=== Liberal Democrats ===
The Liberal Democrats membership increased sharply after the confirmation on 18 April 2017 of the 8 June 2017 general election. Membership again increased sharply in the period before and after the two elections of May 2019, for the UK Councils and the European Parliament, though it fell again after the general election that year.

=== Scottish National Party ===
There was a huge surge in membership after the 2014 Scottish independence referendum, prior to which the SNP had just over 25,000 members. Membership peaked at over 125,000 in August 2018, before falling by tens of thousands in the final years of Nicola Sturgeon's leadership.

=== Reform UK ===
Membership increased by over 50% from 31,000 to 45,000+ in the eight days after Nigel Farage announced he would be returning to lead the party.

=== Restore Britain ===
Restore Britain experienced rapid membership growth following its launch as a political party on 13 February 2026. On 16 February 2026, the party announced that it had reached 50,000 members just days after its formation. Two days later, party leader Rupert Lowe said that membership had risen to 70,000. The party subsequently surpassed 96,000 members by 3 June 2026. On 16 June 2026, The Times reported that Restore Britain had 130,000 paying members.

=== Green Party of England and Wales ===
On 31 December 2015, the Green Party of England and Wales announced its membership as 63,219, its highest known membership up to that date. On 19 September 2025, it was revealed that the party had reached over 75,000 members. Less than a month later, on 9 October 2025, the party tweeted it had reached 95,000 members, a day after announcing it had surpassed 90,000. This "surge" has been accredited to their new leader, Zack Polanski, who was elected a month prior. On 12 October 2025, the party reached a record-breaking 100,000 members, marking an over 45% increase since Polanski was elected, and as of 13 April 2026, the Green Party has over 226,000 members.

=== Co-operative Party ===
Though the Co-operative Party stands joint candidates with the Labour Party, their membership bases are independent (members have the option of joining both parties).

== Enforcement ==
There are few high-profile cases of membership criteria enforcement and as such tend to happen under exceptional circumstances.

=== 2015 Labour leadership election ===
During the 2015 Labour party leadership election it emerged that 260 former candidates from the Green Party, Left Unity and the Trade Union and Socialist Coalition had attempted to become registered supporters, but were blocked from voting. Shortly before this, it was revealed that Conservative MP and former junior minister Tim Loughton had been caught applying to become a registered Labour supporter, subsequently claiming that his intention was to "blow the gaff on what a complete farce the whole thing is".

Veteran Labour MP Barry Sheerman also joined calls for the election to be "paused" over the fears of infiltration by other parties. The Labour Party told representatives of the four candidates at a meeting on 11 August that 1,200 members and supporters of other parties had been excluded and a further 800 were under investigation. Harriet Harman at the time admitted that as many as 100,000 people may be blocked from voting.

The number of those rejected eventually reached 56,000, around 9.1 per cent of the 610,753 considered eligible to vote at the start of the contest. According to the party, 45,000 of those were rejected for not being on the electoral register. Labour also confirmed that it would cancel supporters' votes after they had been cast, if it was found that they were members of other parties. A number of high-profile individuals have been blocked from voting, including Marcus Chown, Jeremy Hardy, Douglas Henshall, Ken Loach, Francesca Martinez, Mark Serwotka, Pete Sinclair, Mark Steel, Luke Wright and Toby Young.

Andrew MacKinlay, a former Labour MP, further alleged that Labour was attempting to rig its own leadership election against Corbyn; a view shared by Jeremy Hardy. Such allegations became known to the media – and particularly Corbyn supporters – as the "Labour Purge", with #LabourPurge trending on Twitter. Claims of such a "purge" of Corbyn supporters were rejected by Harman who insisted that the exclusion processes were impartial to candidates. Scottish newspaper The National printed a page-long satirical cartoon speculating further vote-rigging by Labour's leadership.

=== Brexit ===
Conservative peer Michael Heseltine had the whip removed in 2019 after expressing his intention to vote Liberal Democrat. Conservative policy appears to make such expulsions discretionary, despite threats from Conservative Campaign Headquarters. Tony Blair's support for pro-remain parties led to questions about why he had not been expelled from the Labour Party. Alastair Campbell was expelled from the Labour Party after saying he voted for the Liberal Democrats in the 2019 European election. Many Labour members came out in support of Campbell using the hashtag #expelmetoo, reporting that they had similarly voted for the Liberal Democrats or other remain parties.

== Criteria for membership ==
Party	Membership restrictions
Labour Party	"are not members of political parties or organisations ... declared ... ineligible for affiliation to the party." "[Must not stand in] opposition to a Labour candidate" "[Must not support] a political organisation ... who stands against an official Labour candidate"
Reform UK	"Membership of the Party shall be open to any natural person who shares the objectives and core beliefs of the Party and who agrees to abide by this Constitution and any Rules which may from time to time be made by the Board [...]" "Notwithstanding anything in Article IV of this Constitution, the Board may from time to time make Rules concerning the refusal of or exclusion from membership of persons or classes of persons whose admittance to membership of the Party would, in its opinion, be inimical to the interests of the Party." "The Party Chairman (or, in his absence, his designated deputy) shall, without reservation or qualification, be entitled, to refuse to admit any person to membership."
Green Party of England and Wales	"Membership is open to any person who subscribes to the object of the Party, and is not already a member of another political party, other than Green Parties abroad, subject to clause 4(vii) below." "No member of the Party may be a candidate for any other party in an election for any level of government and no member of another party may be a candidate for The Green Party in any such election except in cases of joint candidacies. No member of the Party may stand as an independent candidate against properly selected Green Party candidate(s). No member may campaign for any candidate standing against a properly selected Green Party candidate."
Conservative Party	"open to all who share its objects and values and who undertake to be bound by this Constitution" "Membership of the Conservative Party is not compatible with Membership of or association with any other registered political party"
Liberal Democrats	"Open to all persons who agree with its fundamental values and objectives without discrimination as to age, ethnic origin, religion, disability, gender or sexual orientation." "Membership may be revoked [due to] standing against the candidate of the Party" "Membership may be refused [due to] membership of another political party in Great Britain"
Advance UK	"Only individuals who meet the following criteria can be Members." "The Party shall admit to Membership any individual who: applies to the Party using the application process approved by the directors; is on the electoral roll; and is not a member of another political party."
Scottish National Party (SNP)	"I endorse the aims of the Party" "A member may not contest or be a member of any organisation [deemed to be a Political Party] contesting elections in opposition to the Party"
Sinn Féin	"only residents of Ireland are eligible for membership"
Plaid Cymru	"I endorse the aims of the Party and agree to abide by its constitution. I am not a member of any other political party active in Wales"
Co-operative Party	"must also be a member of a recognised co-operative" "...agree to accept the rules and to promote the policy and values of the Co-operative Party. ...not a member of any political Party other than the Labour Party or the Social Democratic and Labour Party."
Alliance Party	Disclose if you/I "am/was a member of another UK or Irish political party" and give the name of the party.
Scottish Greens	"I accept and will further the aims of the Scottish Green Party, and am not a member of any other political party except a sister Green party"
Green Party in Northern Ireland	"not a member of any other political party."
Traditional Unionist Voice (TUV)	Support for the principles of Unionism, Independence from the Republic of Ireland and Family values
UK Independence Party (UKIP)	"open to any natural person who shares the objectives and core beliefs of the Party" "[Membership shall be revoked if a member] joins another political party ... or any organisation membership of which the NEC has declared to be incompatible" "[Membership shall be revoked if a member] has set up or has aided and abetted the setting up of another political party" "[Membership shall be revoked if a member] stands against a UKIP candidate in any election" "I am not and have never been a member of Hope not Hate, Antifa, Communist League, Left Unity, Extinction Rebellion or Just Stop Oil."
Communist Party of Britain	"Apply to join the Communist Party by paying an initial online registration fee (£6). Once you have registered an online application you will be contacted by a representative of your local Party branch for a membership interview. New members are only admitted to the Party on acceptance by their local CP organisation. If your application to join the Communist Party is refused, you will be refunded your online registration fee, with £1 retained to cover administration costs. Please note if you apply to join and withdraw your application, your application fee is not refundable." "You must be aged 16 or above to join the Communist Party."
Official Monster Raving Loony Party	"One year’s membership to The Loony Party is £15". Provide a "Loony Name".

== See also ==
- List of elected British politicians who have changed party affiliation
- List of political parties by membership
- List of political parties in the United Kingdom
- Politics of the United Kingdom
