= Timeline of political parties in the United Kingdom =

The following timeline of political parties in the United Kingdom shows the period during which various parties were active, from their date of establishment to their date of dissolution. Defunct parties are shown in green, and currently active parties are shown in pink. An asterisk (*) or dagger (†) indicates that the exact year of establishment or dissolution, respectively, is not certain. Where a party has changed its name over the course of its existence, only the most recent name is given.

== See also ==
- List of political parties in the United Kingdom
