= MP3 Party =

- Leader: Ruslan G. Fedorovsky
- Founded: 2002
- Dissolved: 2007

Website
- http://www.audiobooksforfree.com/MP3Party/default.asp

The MP3 Party was a British political party founded in 2002 that promised to "delete one regulation per day, one law per week, one subsidy per month and one tax per year". This was based on the idea that when social, legal and administrative systems reach a certain level of complexity they cease functioning.

The inspiration for the name came from the file sharing community. The party was originally refused registration by the Electoral Commission on the grounds that their proposed name would constitute an infringement of the MP3 trademark, but Grundig confirmed that it did not own the trademark.

The party was founded by Ruslan Fedorovsky, who, along with three others, spent £30,000 on establishing the party. It claimed a membership of 10. "Eccentric" policies included founding a "Commissariat for Simplification", banning lawyers from sitting in Parliament, sending prisoners to other countries to cut costs, reinstating the death penalty, Broadband in all homes, a foreign policy of neutrality, and allowing anyone to use a royal title if 100 people will act as their subjects.

It never contested any elections, and was offered for sale for £2000 in 2005 on eBay as Fedorovsky said they were "too preoccupied with their own projects." It deregistered in January 2007.

== See also ==
- Pirate Party UK
