= New Deal (British political party) =

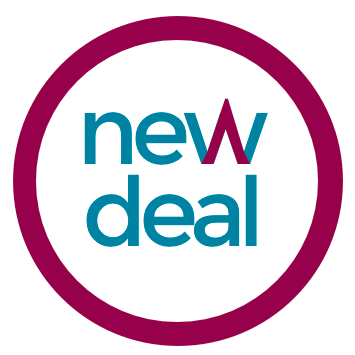
- Leader: Alan Sked
- Founded: 2013
- Dissolved: 2015
- Ideology: Euroscepticism; Social liberalism
- Political position: Centre-left
- Slogan: 'A New Voice For A New Politics'

New Deal was a registered political party in the United Kingdom. Its founder was Professor Alan Sked, who also founded the UK Independence Party (UKIP).

Policies of the New Deal party included 'direct and transparent democracy' and 'liberal values without prejudice to race, religion, gender, etc." New Deal was labelled the 'leftwing version of UKIP'.

New Deal is described by its founder, Professor Alan Sked, as a centre-left political party, committed to withdrawal from the European Union. He criticises UKIP as turning into "a far-right and what I think is an extremist and racist party".

The term "New Deal", first used by US president Franklin D. Roosevelt, was also used by Tony Blair's government from 1997 to describe changes to welfare and unemployment policy.

The same year the party was launched, Sked became ill, his mother became sick and his brother died. As of June 2016, the party has been de-registered by Electoral Commission for having never fielded a single candidate in any election. The party boycotted the 2014 European Elections.
