= Alan Sked =

Former Leader of the UK Independence Party (born 1947)

Alan Sked FRHistS
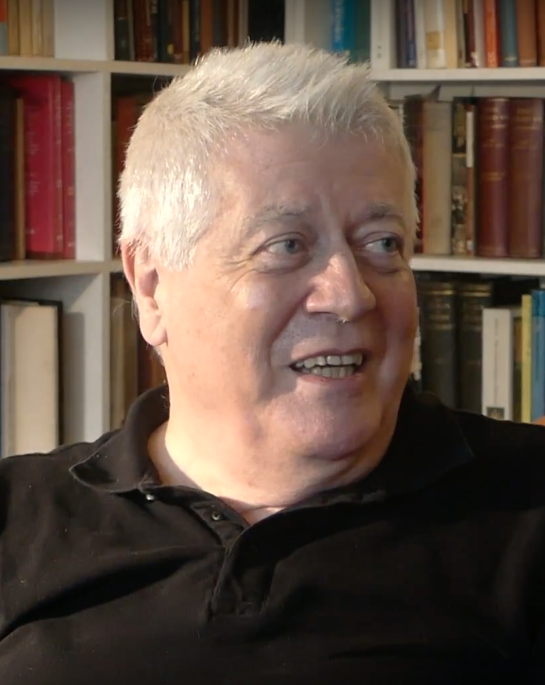
- Sked in 2018

Leader of Prosper UK
- In office 2018–2020
- Preceded by: Party established
- Succeeded by: Party dissolved

Leader of New Deal
- In office 13 September 2013 – March 2015
- Preceded by: Party established
- Succeeded by: Party dissolved

Leader of the UK Independence Party
- In office 3 September 1993 – May 1997
- Preceded by: Himself: as leader of the Anti-Federalist League
- Succeeded by: Craig Mackinlay (acting)

Leader of the Anti-Federalist League
- In office November 1991 – 3 September 1993
- Preceded by: Group established
- Succeeded by: Himself: as leader of UKIP

Personal details
- Born: 22 August 1947 (age 79) Cathcart, Glasgow, Scotland
- Party: Independent (2022-present)
- Other political affiliations: Liberal (Late 1980s); Anti-Federalist League (1991–1993); UKIP (1993–1997); New Deal (2013–2015); Prosper UK (2018–2020); All for Unity (2020–2022)
- Education: University of Glasgow; Merton College, Oxford

Alan Sked FRHistS (born 22 August 1947) is a Scottish Eurosceptic academic. He founded the Anti-Federalist League (in order to oppose the Maastricht Treaty) and its successor the UK Independence Party (UKIP); he later founded New Deal and then Prosper UK in opposition to UKIP. He is Professor Emeritus of International History at the London School of Economics and has stood as a candidate in several parliamentary elections.

== Early life ==
Sked was educated at Allan Glen's School in Glasgow, before going on to study Modern and Medieval History at the University of Glasgow, followed by a DPhil in Modern History at Merton College, Oxford.

== Academic career ==
Sked's doctoral supervisor at Oxford was A. J. P. Taylor, who was a major influence on him. In particular, Sked's writings on the Habsburg monarchy owe much to Taylor, although their interpretations are very different. He has also written texts on British political and European history. His books have been translated into German, Italian, Czech, Portuguese, Japanese and Chinese.

At the London School of Economics (LSE) he taught courses on US and modern intellectual history, and on the history of sex, race and slavery. He retired in 2015, and as of January 2018 is an Emeritus Professor in the LSE's Department of International History. Sked is a member of the British-American Project, which exists to promote Britain's political ties to the US.

== Political career ==
In the 1970 general election he stood at Paisley as a candidate for the Liberal Party (which later combined with the SDP to form the Liberal Democrats), but later rejected the party's support because it favoured movement toward a European Union (EU). He served for ten years (1980–1990) as Convenor of European Studies, a postgraduate MSc programme at LSE, where he examined many theses on European history and served as joint chairman of LSE's European Research Seminar. He came to believe that the EC was corrupt and anti-democratic, and a liability to the British economy. He was a founding member of the Bruges Group and remained a member until 1991, when he was expelled by its executive committee. This was because in November 1991 he had founded the Anti-Federalist League (AFL), an anti-EC political party that ran candidates, including Sked, in the 1992 general election, when he contested Bath.

In 1993, Sked stood in two parliamentary by-elections: one at Newbury, where he shared a platform with Enoch Powell, who spoke in his support, and a second, soon afterward, at Christchurch. On both occasions he came fourth, behind the major parties (there were 19 candidates at Newbury and 14 at Christchurch). Encouraged by these results, the AFL changed its name that September to the UK Independence Party (UKIP). Sked, however, resigned the leadership shortly after the 1997 general election, citing party factionalism and the growing influence of radical, far-right opinion in the party's ranks, saying that it was "doomed to remain on the political fringes". He also opposed its plan to take up places in the European Parliament if seats should be won there, wanting all party efforts to be concentrated on the UK Parliament.

Shortly before each subsequent national election (European Parliament, 1999, Westminster, 2001 and European Parliament, 2004), he published articles accusing UKIP of extremism and incompetence. A few days before the 2004 election to the European Parliament, in which UKIP increased its representation from three to twelve seats, he criticised his former party in a national newspaper, saying, "They are racist and have been infected by the far-right." He went on record saying, "UKIP is even less liberal than the British National Party (BNP). Certainly, there is a symbiosis between elements of the parties," and, "UKIP's MEPs are a standing joke at Strasbourg, where their attendance record, even by the standards of most MEPs, is relatively poor and where, according to independent research by the European Studies centre at the London School of Economics, the three often vote in different ways on the same issue."

In 2003, just before the Iraq War, he wrote that opposition to the militaristic foreign policy of George W. Bush within Europe was not born of principle, but rather stemmed "largely from jealousy of the United States" and a purported knowledge that European countries, united or otherwise, "have no military, diplomatic, moral or economic resources with which to challenge the United States".

In September 2013, he founded New Deal, a political party described as "a new left-of-centre, anti-EU party which he hopes will challenge Labour", and appeared on the BBC TV Daily Politics show to discuss it. New Deal was de-registered in 2015, having never fielded a single candidate in any election.

=== After the 2014 European Parliament elections ===
Following the 2014 European elections, he further criticised UKIP as "Frankenstein's monster" and said that he intended to stand against the Labour leader Ed Miliband in the 2015 general election. He also described his former UKIP colleague Nigel Farage as a "dim-witted racist".

In an article dated 21 October 2015 for The National Interest, Sked wrote the following regarding Nigel Farage and the state of UKIP under his leadership,

After I stepped down to return to academic life, however, the party came under control of a preposterous mountebank named Nigel Farage, who reoriented it to the far right. The clause about a lack of prejudices was abolished and all sorts of nasty statements were made against blacks, Muslims and gays. Former members of the National Front were allowed to work for the party or become candidates. The party itself has deliquesced into a cult around Farage, whose electoral failure in 2015 has made him an object of scorn in the media and prompted his financial backers to desert him. Farage has become a convenient figure with which to frighten moderate voters about the consequences of fulfilling my party’s original mission—withdrawal from the European Union.

=== Prosper UK ===
Sked announced in early December 2018 the founding of another political party, Prosper UK. It was intended as a eurosceptic alternative to UKIP in response to perceived radical elements growing within the party, such as Tommy Robinson's admission as a special advisor to UKIP's then leader Gerard Batten. Sked saw UKIP under Batten as unacceptable to moderate voters, and that Prosper UK could provide a "clean break". Prosper UK was de-registered from the Register of Political Parties in August 2020.

=== All for Unity ===
In 2021, he was announced as a candidate for All for Unity, a new party led by George Galloway to contest the 2021 Scottish Parliament election.

== Elections contested ==
UK Parliament elections

Date of election	Constituency	Party	Votes	%
1970 general election	Paisley	Liberal	2,918	6.2
1992 general election	Bath	Anti-Federalist League	117	0.2
1993 by-election	Newbury	Anti-Federalist League	601	1.0
1993 by-election	Christchurch	Anti-Federalist League	878	1.6
1997 general election	Romsey	UK Independence Party	1,824	3.5

== Partial bibliography ==
- Sked, A. & Cook, C. (eds.) (1976) Crisis and Controversy: Essays in Honour of A.J.P. Taylor. (London: Macmillan) ISBN 0-333-18635-4.
- Sked, A. & Cook, C. (1979) Post-war Britain: A Political History
- Sked, A. (1979) The Survival of the Habsburg Empire: Radetzky, the Imperial Army and the Class War, 1848. (London: Longmans) ISBN 0-582-50711-1.
- Sked, A. (1987) Britain's Decline: Problems and Perspectives. (Oxford: Basil Blackwell) ISBN 0-631-15084-6.
- Sked, A. & Cook, C. (1993) Post-war Britain: a Political History (1945–1992). (4th ed.) (Harmondsworth: Penguin) ISBN 0-14-017912-7.
- Sked, A. (2001) The Decline and Fall of the Habsburg Empire, 1815–1918. (2nd ed.) (London: Longman) ISBN 0-582-35666-0.
- Sked, A. (2007), Metternich and Austria: An Evaluation. (London: Palgrave MacMillan) ISBN 1-4039-9114-6
- Sked, A. (2011) Radetzky: Imperial Victor and Military Genius. (London: I.B. Tauris)
- Sked, A. (2020) A Critical History of Scotland from Independence to the Present in 14 articles. (Think Scotland, Edinburgh)

== Sources ==
- Sked, Alan (2003). "Bush as Strategist". Foreign Policy (135): 6–7. doi:10.2307/3183579. JSTOR 3183579.

Party political offices
Preceded by New office	Leader of the United Kingdom Independence Party; 1993–1997	Succeeded by Craig Mackinlay
