= Newport Independents Party =

- Leader: Kevin Whitehead
- Nominating officer: Jason Alan Jordan
- Treasurer: Diane Josephine Jordan
- Campaigns officer: Kevin Whitehead
- Additional officer: Andrew Collingbourne
- Founded: 16 March 2017; 9 years ago
- Headquarters: 605 Monnow Way; Bettws; Newport; NP20 7DJ
- Colours: Amber
- Newport City Council: 3 / 51

Website
- newportindependents.co.uk

The Newport Independents Party (Welsh: Plaid Annibynwyr Casnewydd) is a small political party formed in 2017 to campaign in the city of Newport, Wales. The party won three council seats on Newport City Council in May 2022.

The Newport Independents Party was registered with the Electoral Commission in March 2017 by its founder, Councillor Kevin Whitehead. It aimed to break the "stale national party politics" in the city. It allowed independent councillors to work as a group and, therefore, have the right to sit on council scrutiny committees.

The party fielded fifteen candidates in the May 2017 elections to Newport City Council and one candidate for Rogerstone Community Council. Four Newport Independents were elected to Newport City Council on 4 May 2017: Kevin Whitehead, Janet Cleverly and Jason Jordan won seats in the Bettws ward and one candidate - Chris Evans - was successful in Rogerstone. Evans resigned from the party in January 2022 after being discovered soliciting a sex worker.

The party fielded ten candidates in the May 2022 local elections, across six Newport wards. It retained its three seats in the Bettws ward.
