= United in Europe =

United In Europe
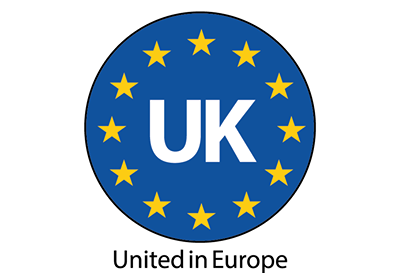
- Abbreviation: UiE
- Chairman: Charles Cormack
- Nominating Officer: Sarah Wilson
- Treasurer: Robert Wilson
- Founded: April 3, 2014
- Dissolved: November 4, 2015
- Headquarters: Edinburgh, UK
- Ideology: Liberalism, Pro-Europeanism
- Colours: Navy Blue and yellow
- Slogan: Say Yes to Change, No to UKIP

Website
- unitedineurope.org (archive)

United in Europe was a British single-issue pro-European political party formed to only contest European Parliament elections, though it never stood. The party advocated continued membership of the UK in the European Union, with stronger ties and deeper political representation within the European Parliament.

== History ==
United in Europe was founded by Charles Cormack in early January 2014 and registered on 3 April 2014, as a response to the rise of the UK Independence Party (UKIP) and the influence it was exerting on other political parties. The party believed that UKIP's newfound prominence caused other political parties within the UK to alter their policies and become increasingly Eurosceptic, which the party strongly criticised. The party did not stand in the European Parliament elections and was deregistered in November 2015.

== Policies ==
United in Europe's overriding policy was Britain's continued membership of the EU. The party argued that Britain's future should be at the heart of the EU, as a leader that "spearheads European initiatives". The party described its general ethos as for British youth, who are not represented by the older established political class, often seen as corrupt and unaccountable. United in Europe described itself as social liberal party, supporting social equality, social justice, the free movement of people and resources, a common market, and reducing barriers and borders.

Primarily campaigning in Scotland for the 2014 European elections, the party considered itself a British party with aspirations to become a European-wide movement. Their stance on the Scottish independence referendum was neutral as the party believed that a strong pro-EU voice was vital, whether Scotland became independent or not.
