= List of political parties in the United Kingdom by representation =

; This is a list of political parties in the United Kingdom, by their historic representation in elected bodies.

== British House of Commons ==
Party	Founded	First represented	Last represented	Dissolved	Maximum representation	MPs	Notes
Alba Party	2021	2021	2024	N/A	2 (2021)	Kenny MacAskill; Neale Hanvey	Split from the Scottish National Party
All-for-Ireland League	1909	1909	1918	1918	8 (1910)		
Alliance Party of Northern Ireland	1970	1973	Present	N/A	1 (1973)	Stephen Farry; Naomi Long; Stratton Mills; Sorcha Eastwood	
Anti H-Block	1981	1981	1982	1982	1 (1981)	Bobby Sands; Owen Carron	Merged into Sinn Féin
Anti-Waste League	1921	1921	1922	1922	2 (1921)	James Malcolm Monteith Erskine; Murray Sueter	
Blaenau Gwent People's Voice	2005	2010	2011	2011	1 (2010)	Peter Law, Dai Davies	
British Socialist Party	1911	1920	1920	1920	1 (1920)	Cecil L'Estrange Malone	Merged into the Communist Party of Great Britain
Change UK	2019	2019	2019	2019	11 (2019)	List	Split from the Labour and Conservative Parties in February 2019, dissolved December 2019
Christian Pacifist (Fellowship of Reconciliation)	1915	1923	1924	N/A	1 (1923)	George M. Ll. Davies	
Coalition Labour	1918	1918	1922	1922			
Colne Valley Labour Union	1891	1907	1910	1918	1 (1907)	Victor Grayson	Won the 1907 Colne Valley by-election
Commonwealth Labour Party	1942	1942	1947	1947	1 (1942)	Harry Midgley	
Common Wealth Party	1942	1942	1946	1993	5 (1945)	List	
Communist Party of Great Britain	1920	1920	1950	1991	2 (1945)	Willie Gallacher; Cecil L'Estrange Malone; Walton Newbold; Phil Piratin; Shapurji Saklatvala	
Conservative Party	1835	1835	Present	N/A	473 (1931)	List	
Constitutionalists	1923	1923	1925	1929	12 (1923)	Winston Churchill, Hamar Greenwood, Algernon Moreing, Thomas Robinson, John Ward, Abraham England, Henry Hogbin, John Sturrock	
Co-operative Party	1917	1918	Present	N/A	38 (2017)	List	Affiliated with the Labour Party since 1927
Democratic Labour	1972	1972	1974	1979	1 (1972)	Dick Taverne	
Democratic Party	1969	1969	1970	1971	1 (1969)	Desmond Donnelly	
Democratic Unionist Party	1971	1971	Present	N/A	10 (2017)	List	Formed from the Protestant Unionist Party
Empire Free Trade Crusade	1929	1930	1931	1930s	1 (1930)	Ernest Taylor	Joint candidate with the United Empire Party
English National Party	1960s	1976	1976	1980	1 (1976)	John Stonehouse	
Federation of Labour	1944	1945	1949	1949	1 (1945)	Jack Beattie	Merged into the Irish Labour Party
Green Party of England and Wales	1973	1992	Present	N/A	4 (2024)	Cynog Dafis; Caroline Lucas; Sian Berry; Carla Denyer; Ellie Chowns; Adrian Ramsay	Dafis was a joint candidate with Plaid Cymru
Crofters Party	1880s	1885	1895	1890s	4 (1885)	Gavin Brown Clark; Charles Fraser-Mackintosh; Roderick MacDonald; Donald Horne Macfarlane	
Independent Alliance (UK)	2024	2024	Present	N/A	5 (2024)	Jeremy Corbyn, Shockat Adam, Adnan Hussain, Iqbal Mohamed, Ayoub Khan	Not a full-fledged party, but a Technical group
Independent Irish Party	1852	1852	1858	1858	40 (1852)		Split from the Liberal Party
Independent Kidderminster Hospital and Health Concern	2000	2001	2010	N/A	1 (2001)	Richard Taylor	
Independent Liberals	1931	1931	1935	1935	5 (1931)	David Lloyd George; Gwilym Lloyd George; Megan Lloyd George; Frank Owen; Goronwy Owen	Not a separate party per se; its members were official Liberal Party candidates who rejected the National Government.
Independent Labour Party	1893	1893	1947	1975			Affiliated with the Labour Party from 1900 until 1931
Independent Parliamentary Group	1920	1920	1921	1921			
Irish Confederate Party	1847	1847	1848	1848	2 (1847)	Thomas Chisholm Anstey; William Smith O'Brien	
Irish Labour Party	1912	1949	1955	N/A	1 (1949)	Jack Beattie	
Labour Independent Group	1949	1949	1950	1950	5 (1949)	Lester Hutchinson; John Platts-Mills; Denis Nowell Pritt; Leslie Solley; Konni Zilliacus	
Labour Party	1906	1906	Present	N/A	418 (1997)	List	Formed from the Labour Representation Committee
Labour Independent Group	1949	1949	1950	1950	5 (1949)	Denis Pritt, Lester Hutchinson, John Platts-Mills, Leslie Solley, Konni Zilliacus	Denis Pritt was expelled from the Labour Party in 1940 for supporting the Soviet Union in the Winter War, the rest were for supporting Soviet Foreign Policy
Labour Representation Committee	1900	1900	1906	1906	29 (1906)	List	Became the Labour Party
Liberal Democrats	1988	1988	Present	N/A	72 (2024)	List	Merger of the Liberal Party and the Social Democratic Party
Liberal Party	1859	1859	1988	1988	397 (1906)	List	Merged into the Liberal Democrats
Liberal Unionist Party	1886	1886	1912	1912	77 (1886)	List	Split from the Liberal Party; merged into the Conservative Party
Mebyon Kernow	1951	1964	1970	N/A	2 (1964)	Peter Bessell, John Pardoe, David Mudd	multi party membership
Militant tendency	1964	1983	1991	1991	4 (1983)	Eric Heffer, Dave Nellist, Terry Fields, Pat Wall	
National Association of Discharged Sailors and Soldiers	1916	1918	1921	1921	1 (1918)	Robert Hewitt Barker	Semi-official candidate, sponsored by local branch of organisation
National Democratic and Labour Party	1918	1918	1922	1923	9 (1918)		
National Party	1917	1917	1921	1921	8 (1917)		
Nationalist Party (Ireland)	1870	1870	1955	1977	86 (1885)	List	
National Labour	1931	1931	1945	1945	14 (1931)	List	
National Liberal Party	1931	1931	1968	1968	55 (1950)	List	Affiliated with the Conservative Party from 1947
National Socialist Party	1916	1918	1919	1919	3 (1918)	Dan Irving; Jack Jones; Will Thorne	Affiliated with the Labour Party
New Party	1930	1930	1931	1932	6 (1931)	Oliver Baldwin; W. J. Brown; Robert Forgan; Cynthia Mosley; Oswald Mosley; John Strachey	Baldwin and Brown held membership for a single day
Nordic League	1935	1935	1939	1939	1 (1935)	Archibald Maule Ramsay	
Northern Ireland Labour Party	1924	1943	1943	1987	1 (1943)	Jack Beattie	
Plaid Cymru	1925	1966	Present	N/A	4 (1992)	List	
Protestant Unionist Party	1966	1970	1971	1971	1 (1970)	Ian Paisley	Became the Democratic Unionist Party
Referendum Party	1994	1997	1997	1997	1 (1997)	George Gardiner	
Republican Labour Party	1964	1966	1970	1973	1 (1970)	Gerry Fitt	
Reclaim Party	2020	2023	2023	N/A	1 (2023)	Andrew Bridgen	
Reform League	1865	1865	1869	1869	6 (1865)	George Howell (trade unionist), Sir Wilfrid Lawson, 2nd Baronet, of Brayton, Peter Alfred Taylor, Samuel Morley (MP), Charles Bradlaugh, John Bright	
Reform UK	2018	2024	Present	N/A	8 (2026)	List	Founded as the Brexit Party
Respect Party	2004	2005	2015	2016	1 (2005)	George Galloway	
Russellite Unionist	1904	1904	1910	1910	3 (1904)	Sir Thomas Russell, 1st Baronet, James Wood, Edward Mitchell, Robert Glendinning	
Scotland United	2023	2023	Present	N/A	3 (2023)	Kenny MacAskill; Neale Hanvey; Angus MacNeil	Political Grouping
Scottish Labour Party (1888)	1888	1888	1892	1893	1 (1888)	Robert Cunninghame-Graham	Merged into the Independent Labour Party
Scottish Labour Party (1976)	1976	1976	1979	1979	2 (1976)	John Robertson; Jim Sillars	Split from the Labour Party
Scottish National Party	1934	1945	Present	N/A	56 (2015)	List	
Scottish Prohibition Party	1901	1922	1931	1935	1 (1922)	Edwin Scrymgeour	
Sinn Féin	1905	1917	Present	N/A	73 (1918)	List	Sinn Féin MPs do not take their seats
Social Democratic Party	1981	1981	1988	1988	29 (1982)	List	Merged into the Liberal Democrats
Social Democratic Party (1988)	1988	1988	1990	1990	29 (1982)	Rosie Barnes, John Cartwright, David Owen	Formed by Social Democratic Party members who did not join the Liberal Democrats
Social Democratic and Labour Party	1970	1970	Present	N/A	4 (1992)	List	
Traditional Unionist Voice	2007	2024	Present	N/A	1 (2024	Jim Allister	
UK Unionist Party	1995	1995	2001	2008	1 (1995)	Robert McCartney	
Ulster Popular Unionist Party	1980	1980	1995	1995	1 (1980)	James Kilfedder	
Ulster Unionist Labour Association	1918	1918	1922	N/A	3 (1918)	Thomas Henry Burn; Thompson Donald; Samuel McGuffin	Linked with the Ulster Unionist Party
Ulster Unionist Party	1905	1905	Present	N/A	20 (1918)	List	At times affiliated to the Conservative Party
United Empire Party	1920s	1930	1931	1930s	1 (1930)	Ernest Taylor	Joint candidate with the Empire Free Trade Crusade
United Ulster Unionist Party	1975	1975	1982	1982	1 (1975)	John Dunlop	Split from the Vanguard Unionist Progressive Party
UK Independence Party	1993	2008	2017	N/A	2 (2014)	Douglas Carswell; Mark Reckless	
Unity	1960s	1969	1974	1977	2 (1970)	Bernadette Devlin; Frank McManus	
Vanguard Unionist Progressive Party	1973	1973	1978	1978	3 (1974)	Robert Bradford; William Craig; John Dunlop	Split from and later merged into the Ulster Unionist Party
Workers Party of Britain	2019	2024	2024	N/A	1 (2024)	George Galloway	
Your Party	2025	2025	2025	N/A	1 (2025)	Zarah Sultana	
Repeal Association	1830	1832	1847	1848	42 (1832)		Also Known as the Irish Repeal Party
Home Rule League	1873	1874	1880	1882	59 (1874)		Became the Irish Parliamentary Party
Liberal–Labour	1870	1874	1918	1918			
Independent Conservative	1911	1911	N/A	N/A			
Independent Nationalist	1880	1880	1955	N/A	N/A		Not a Political Party but a Description for Irish Nationalist who are not affiliated with a Political Party same meaning as the Description used in the Northern Ireland Assembly today
Chartist	1838	1847	1852	1857	1 (1847)		
Birkenhead Social Justice	2019	2019	2019	2019	1 (2019)		
The Independents (UK)	2019	2019	2019	2019	5 (2019)	Gavin Shuker, John Woodcock, Luciana Berger, Angela Smith, Heidi Allen	
Scottish Socialist Party (1932)	1932	1932	1940	1940	2 (1932)	Neil Maclean, Thomas Johnston	
Ministerialist	1768	1768	1774	1774	225 (1766)	Lord North	
Northite	1774	1774	1784	1784	396 (1780)		
Bedford Whigs	1751	1751	1774	1783	23 (1751)		
Rockingham Whigs	1765	1768	1784	1784	254 (1780)	William Dowdeswell, Henry Seymour Conway	
Grenville Whigs	1740	1765	1774	1774	41 (1768)	George Grenville	
Radicals	1750	1768	1857	1859	15 (1852)		

== London Assembly ==
Party	Founded	First represented	Last represented	Dissolved	Maximum representation	AMs	Notes
Brexit Alliance	2018	2018	2021	2021	2 (2018)	Peter Whittle, David Kurten	
British National Party	1982	2008	2010	N/A	1 (2008)	Richard Barnbrook	Was expelled from party in first term
Communist Party of Great Britain	1920	1946	1949	1990	2 (1946)	Ted Bramley, Jack Gaster	
Conservative and Unionist Party	1835	1946	N/A	N/A	11 (2008)		
London Green Party	1990	2000	N/A	N/A	3 (2000)		
Heritage Party	2020	2020	2021	N/A	1 (2020)	David Kurten	
Labour and Co-Operative Party	1909	1910	N/A	N/A	101 (1958)		
Liberal Party	1859	1946	1986	1988	6 (1925)		
Liberal Democrats	1988	2000	N/A	N/A	5 (2004)		
One London	2005	2005	2008	2008	2 (2005)	Damian Hockney, Peter Hulme-Cross	
Municipal Reform Party	1906	1906	1946	1946	83 (1925)		
Progressive Party	1888	1889	1928	1928	98 (1901)		
UK Independence Party	1993	2004	2020	N/A	2 (2004)	Damian Hockney, Peter Hulme-Cross, Peter Whittle, David Kurten	
Veritas	2005	2005	2005	2015	2 (2005)	Damian Hockney, Peter Hulme-Cross	Briefly before Forming One London

== British House of Lords ==
Party	Founded	First represented	Last represented	Dissolved	Maximum representation	Members	Notes
British People's Party	1939	1939	1953	1954	3 (1943)	Gerard Wallop, 9th Earl of Portsmouth, Hastings Russell, 12th Duke of Bedford, Ronald Nall-Cain, 2nd Baron Brocket	
British Fascists	1923	1923	1934	1934	1 (1923)	Leopold Ernest Stratford George Canning, 4th Baron Garvagh	
British Union of Fascists	1932	1940	1932	1940	7 (1936)	Patrick Boyle, David Freeman-Mitford, Josslyn Hay, Edward Russell, Hastings Russell, Harold Harmsworth, Edward Frederick Langley Russell	
Communist Party of Great Britain	1920	1962	1991	1991	1 (1962)	Wogan Philipps	
Conservative Party	1835	1835	Present	N/A			
Green Party of England and Wales	1973	1980s	Present	N/A	1 (1999)	George MacLeod; Timothy Beaumont, Baron Beaumont of Whitley; Jenny Jones, Baroness Jones of Moulsecoomb	
Labour Party	1906	1924	Present	N/A			
Liberal Democrats	1988	1988	Present	N/A			Merger of the Liberal Party and the Social Democratic Party
Liberal Party	1859	1859	1988	1988			Merged into the Liberal Democrats
National Party	1917	1917	1921	1921	3 (1917)	Oliver Russell, 2nd Baron Ampthill, Sir Richard Cooper, 2nd Baronet, Henry Page Croft, 1st Baron Croft	
Nordic League	1935	1935	1939	1939	2 (1935)	Arthur Wellesley, 5th Duke of Wellington, Ronald Nall-Cain, 2nd Baron Brocket	
Reform UK	2018	2024	Present	N/A	2 (2025)	Keith Prince, Alex Wilson	
Social Democratic Party	1981	1981	1988	1988			Merged into the Liberal Democrats
Social Democratic Party (1988)	1988	1988	1990	1990	17 (1988)		Continuation of the Social Democratic Party
United Kingdom Independence Party	1993	1990s	2019	N/A	2 (2007)	Richard Norton, 8th Baron Grantley; Malcolm Pearson, Baron Pearson of Rannoch; David Verney, 21st Baron Willoughby de Broke	
Universal League for the Material Elevation of the Industrious Classes	1863	1863	1865	1865	1 (1863)	John Townshend, 5th Marquess Townshend	

== Northern Ireland Assembly ==
Party	Founded	First represented	Last represented	Dissolved	Maximum representation	MLAs	Notes
Alliance Party of Northern Ireland	1973	1998	Present	N/A	17 (2022)	John Alderdice; Kellie Armstrong; Eileen Bell; John Blair; Paula Bradshaw; Patrick Brown; Seamus Close; Judith Cochrane; Stewart Dickson; Danny Donnelly; Sorcha Eastwood; Connie Egan; Stephen Farry; David Ford; Máire Hendron; David Honeyford; Anna Lo; Naomi Long; Trevor Lunn; Chris Lyttle; Kieran McCarthy; Peter McReynolds; Nick Mathison; Nuala McAllister; Andrew Muir; Seán Neeson; Kate Nicholl; Patricia O'Lynn; Eóin Tennyson	
Anti-Partition League	1945	1953	1958	1958	2 (1953)	Eddie McAteer, Malachy Conlon	
Commonwealth Labour Party	1942	1945	1947	1947	1 (1942)	Only MP and Founder Defected to the Ulster Unionist Party	
Democratic Unionist Party	1971	1998	Present	N/A	38 (2011)		
Fianna Uladh	1953	1953	1954	1954	1 (1953)	Liam Kelly (Irish republican)	
Green Party in Northern Ireland	1983	2007	2022	N/A	2 (2016)	Steven Agnew; Clare Bailey; Brian Wilson; Rachel Woods	
Labour coalition	1996	1998	1998	1998	2 (1996)	Malachi Curran, Hugh Casey	
Irish Labour Party	1912	1951	1963	N/A	1 (1951)		
Nationalist Party (Northern Ireland)	1918	1921	1973	1977	11 (1929)		
NI21	2013	2013	2016	2016	2 (2013)	Basil McCrea, John McCallister	Split from the Ulster Unionist Party
Northern Ireland Labour Party	1924	1925	1975	1987	4 (1958)		
Northern Ireland Women's Coalition	1996	1996	2003	2006	2 (1996)	Monica McWilliams, Pearl Sagar	
Northern Ireland Unionist Party	1999	1999	2003	2008	4 (1999)	Norman Boyd; Roger Hutchinson; Patrick Roche; Cedric Wilson	Split from the UK Unionist Party
Northern Ireland Women's Coalition	1996	1998	2003	2006	2 (1998)	Monica McWilliams; Jane Morrice	
People Before Profit Alliance	2005	2016	Present	N/A	2 (2016)	Gerry Carroll; Eamonn McCann	
Progressive Unionist Party	1979	1998	2010	N/A	2 (1998)	Billy Hutchinson; Dawn Purvis; David Ervine	
Sinn Féin	1905	1921	Present	N/A	29 (2011)		
Social Democratic and Labour Party	1970	1998	Present	N/A	24 (1998)		
Socialist Republican Party	1944	1944	1950	1950	1 (1944)	Harry Diamond	
Traditional Unionist Voice	2007	2011	Present	N/A	1 (2011)	Jim Allister	
UK Independence Party	1993	2012	2016	N/A	1 (2012)	David McNarry	
UK Unionist Party	1995	1998	2007	2008	5 (1998)	Norman Boyd; Roger Hutchinson; Robert McCartney; Patrick Roche; Cedric Wilson	
Ulster Democratic Party	1981	1996	1998	2001	2 (1996)	John White, Gary McMichael	
Ulster Popular Unionist Party	1980	1982	1986	1993	1 (1992)	James Kilfedder	
United Unionist Assembly Party	1998	1998	2003	N/A	3 (1998)	Fraser Agnew; Boyd Douglas; Denis Watson	
Ulster Unionist Party	1905	1921	Present	N/A	28 (1998)		
Unbought Tenants' Association	1913?	1925	1929	?	1 (1925)	George Henderson	
Fianna Fáil	1933	2011	2011	N/A	1 (2007)	Gerry McHugh	Believed that "Fianna Fáil was the right party to bring about change in Northern Ireland".

== Scottish Parliament ==
Party	Founded	First represented	Last represented	Dissolved	Maximum representation	MSPs	Notes
Alba Party	2021	2023	N/A	N/A	1 (2023)	Ash Regan	
Save Stobhill Hospital	2001	2003	2007	N/A	1 (2003)	Jean Turner	
MSP for Falkirk West	1999	1999	2007	N/A	1 (1999)	Dennis Canavan	
Scottish Conservative and Unionist Party	1965	1999	Present	N/A	31 (2016)		
Scottish Green Party	1990	1999	Present	N/A	8 (2021)		
Scottish Labour Party	1909	1999	Present	N/A	56 (1999)		
Scottish Liberal Democrats	1988	1999	Present	N/A	17 (1999)		
Scottish National Party	1934	1999	Present	N/A	69 (2011)		
Scottish Senior Citizens Unity Party	2003	2003	2007	N/A	1 (2003)	John Swinburne	
Scottish Socialist Party	1998	1999	2007	N/A	6 (2003)		
Solidarity	2006	2006	2007	N/A	2 (2006)	Rosemary Byrne; Tommy Sheridan	Split from the Scottish Socialist Party
RISE – Scotland's Left Alliance	2015	2015	2016	N/A	1 (2016)	Jean Urquhart	Split from the Scottish National Party
Reform Scotland	2021	2021	2021	N/A	1 (2021)	Michelle Ballantyne	Split from the Scottish Conservative and Unionist Party
Scottish Peoples' Alliance	2003	2003	2003	2010	2 (2003)	Lyndsay McIntosh, Keith Harding	Briefly defected after being ranked down in the list, lost their seats.

== Welsh Parliament (formerly: National Assembly of Wales) ==
Party	Founded	First represented	Last represented	Dissolved	Maximum representation	AMs/MSs	Notes
John Marek Independent Party/Forward Wales	2003	2003	2007	2003 (John Marek Independent Party)/2010 (Forward Wales)	1 (2003)	John Marek	
Plaid Cymru	1925	1999	Present	N/A	17 (1999)		
United Kingdom Independence Party	1993	2016	2021	2021	7 (2016)		
Wales Labour Party	1947	1999	Present	N/A	30 (2003)		
Welsh Conservative Party	1921	1999	Present	N/A	13 (2009)		
Welsh Liberal Democrats	1988	1999	Present	N/A	6 (1999)		
Propel	2020	2021	2021	N/A	1 (2020)	Neil McEvoy	Spilt from the Plaid Cymru; the party gained four councillors a month after the party's formation
Blaenau Gwent People's Voice	2005	2010	2011	1 (2010)	Peter Law, Dai Davies		
Abolish the Welsh Assembly Party	2015	2020	2021	N/A	2 (2020)	Gareth Bennett; Mark Reckless	Prior to Bennett's joining the party, the party's got its first councillor, who defected from the Welsh Conservative Party, a month earlier. Later that year, Reckless, the former leader, of the Brexit Party of Wales, joined the party,
Independent Alliance for Reform	2020	2020	2021	2021	3 (2020)	Caroline Jones, David Rowlands, Mandy Jones	
Brexit Party	2018	2018	2020	N/A	4 (2020)	Caroline Jones, David Rowlands, Mandy Jones, Mark Reckless	

== European Parliament ==
Party	Founded	First represented	Last represented	Dissolved	Maximum representation	MEPs	Notes
Alliance Party of Northern Ireland	1970	2019	2020	N/A	1 (2019)	Naomi Long	
British Democratic Party	2013	2013	2014	N/A	1 (2013)	Andrew Brons	
British National Party	1982	2009	2014	N/A	2 (2009)	Andrew Brons; Nick Griffin	
Brexit Party	2019	2019	2020	N/A	23 (2019)	List	
Change UK – The Independent Group	2019	2019	2019	N/A	1 (2019)	List	
Conservative Party	1835	1979	2020	N/A	60 (1979)		
Democratic Unionist Party	1971	1979	2020	N/A	1 (1979)	Jim Allister; Diane Dodds; Ian Paisley	
Gibraltar Socialist Labour Party	1978	1999	2009	N/A	1 (1999)	Glyn Ford	Joint List
Green Party of England and Wales	1973	1999	2020	N/A	3 (2014)	Jean Lambert; Caroline Lucas; Keith Taylor; Molly Scott Cato	
Independent Labour Network	1999	1999	1999	2003	1 (1999)	Ken Coates	Split from the Labour Party
Labour Party	1906	1979	2020	N/A	62 (1994)		
Liberal Democrats	1988	1994	2020	N/A	12 (2004)		
Libertarian Party	2007	2018	2019	N/A	1 (2019)	Bill Etheridge	The briefly got first representative in October 2018, but soon their representative later joined the Brexit Party in February 2019.
Plaid Cymru	1925	1999	2020	N/A	2 (1999)	Jillian Evans; Eurig Wyn	
Pro-Euro Conservative Party	1999	1999	1999	2001	2 (1999)	Brendan Donnelly; John Stevens	Split from the Conservative Party
Scottish National Party	1934	1979	2020	N/A	2 (1994)	Winifred Ewing; Ian Hudghton; Allan Macartney; Neil MacCormick; Alyn Smith	
Scottish Socialist Party	1998	1998	1999	N/A	1 (1998)	Hugh Kerr	
Sinn Féin	1905	2004	2020	N/A	1 (2004)	Bairbre de Brún; Martina Anderson	Also had an MEP elected in the Republic of Ireland
Social Democratic and Labour Party	1970	1979	2004	N/A	1 (1979)	John Hume	
Social Democratic Party	1981	1984	1984	1988	1 (1984)	Michael Gallagher	
Social Democratic Party (1990-present)	1990	2018	2019	N/A	1 (2018)	Patrick O'Flynn	This is the second continuation and current incarnation of the original Social Democratic Party
Thurrock Independents	2018	2018	2019	N/A	1 (2018)	Tim Aker	
Traditional Unionist Voice	2007	2007	2009	N/A	1 (2007)	Jim Allister	
United Kingdom Independence Party	1993	1999	2019	N/A	24 (2014)		
Ulster Unionist Party	1905	1979	2019	N/A	1 (1979)	Jim Nicholson; John Taylor	
Veritas	2005	2005	2005	2015	1 (2005)	Robert Kilroy-Silk	Split from the United Kingdom Independence Party; merged into the English Democrats

== See also ==
- Timeline of political parties in the United Kingdom
- List of political parties in the United Kingdom
- List of political parties in the United Kingdom opposed to austerity
- Political make-up of local councils in the United Kingdom
- List of political parties by country
- Politics of the United Kingdom
- Political party affiliation in the United Kingdom
- Elections in the United Kingdom
- List of political parties in Northern Ireland
- List of political parties in Scotland
- List of political parties in Wales
- List of political parties in the Isle of Man (a British Crown dependency)
- List of political parties in Gibraltar (a British overseas territory)
- Index of UK party meta attributes
