= Opposition to devolution in the United Kingdom =

Political debate in the UK

Labelled map of the varying levels of devolution in the United Kingdom as of 2025.

Opposition to devolution in the United Kingdom has taken different forms over time. Historically, anti-devolution sentiment was stronger in both major parties of the United Kingdom, the Conservative Party and the Labour Party, but after 1999 with the founding of the Scottish Parliament, the Senedd (Welsh Parliament), and the Northern Ireland Assembly, support for devolution has become dominant with anti-devolution parties being relatively minor. In the 1970s, plans for devolution failed until elections to new legislatures in 1999.

== England ==
In England, opposition to devolution raised by the "West Lothian question" has led to demands for "English votes for English laws". The English Devolution White Paper has been controversial. Opposition to metro mayors stems from concerns about democracy with critics often arguing that they are unnecessary layers of government.

=== North of England ===
Opposition to devolution succeeded with the result of the 2004 North East England devolution referendum. The Yorkshire Party looks specifically at the issue of a devolved assembly for Yorkshire.

=== South of England ===
A number of anti-devolution Conservative Essex MPs opposed proposals for a mayor of Greater Essex in 2024.

== Northern Ireland ==
Devolution opposition in Northern Ireland primarily stems from concerns about power-sharing arrangements particularly among unionist parties. Complexities in the political institutions have been blamed for distrust in political parties as well as support for Irish unity.

== Scotland ==
The 1979 Scottish devolution referendum failed to establish a devolved assembly. The Scottish Parliament was established by the 1997 Scottish devolution referendum. In 2014, all the three main unionist parties support devolution.

=== Scottish issues ===
The "It's Scotland's oil" issue lead to the decline in opposition to devolution in the 1970s.

=== Scottish Labour ===
The early Scottish Labour Party founded by Keir Hardie had a firm policy of Scottish Home Rule. Anti-devolution Labour MP George Cunningham introduced an amendment a 40% rule for the 1979 Scottish devolution referendum. Tam Dalyell was a prominent opponent of devolution. He warned that it would become a "motorway without exit to a separate state". Helen Liddell as Labour's Scottish general secretary refused to campaign with the SNP for devolution. Labour leader John Smith described devolution as the "settled will of the Scottish people". Lord Robertson famously claimed devolution would "kill nationalism stone dead".

=== Scottish Conservatives ===
In March 1968, Conservative leader Edward Heath committed the party to Scottish devolution. The Conservatives opposed devolution in the 1979 Scottish devolution referendum and the 1997 Scottish devolution referendum.

In 2007, Annabel Goldie, said her party was committed to making the current devolved powers work. As leader Ruth Davidson moved the party to a pro-devolutionist position while keeping strongly unionist, when she proposed income tax powers in a no vote in the 2014 Scottish independence referendum. In the 2021 Scottish Parliament election, Conservatives pledged to make use of devolved powers. In 2023, David Frost, Baron Frost made comments on "rolling back devolution" which were criticised by Scottish Conservatives. Today only few Scottish Conservative politicians openly oppose devolution.

=== Scottish National Party ===
The Scottish National Party was founded in 1934 through an amalgamation of the National Party of Scotland and the Scottish Party. The party has long advocated for home rule for Scotland. However some radical nationalists often argue that Scottish devolution does not go far enough in achieving Scottish independence. The SNP has supported further devolution while in government.

== Wales ==
=== Welsh issues ===
In Wales devolution began with the creation of the Welsh Board for Education in 1907 and the disestablishment of the Anglican Church in Wales in 1920. Issues today include a proposed Welsh justice system, with opponents to devolving justice and policing including deputy leader of Welsh Labour Carolyn Harris. Other concerns include a proposed Welsh independence referendum, although this has been ruled out by Plaid Cymru for their first term in government if they are elected.

=== Welsh Labour ===
Labour opposed devolution to Wales in the 20th century primarily due to concerns about the potential for increased nationalism and the belief that it could undermine socialist principles and be divisive between speakers of English and Welsh languages. The Labour government elected in the 1945 United Kingdom general election was rigorously centralist, with Aneurin Bevan who was contemptuous of any concession to Welsh nationalism. In the 1970s it became Labour policy to support devolution. One of the biggest anti-devolutionists was Neil Kinnock who campaigned against it in the 1979 Welsh devolution referendum. This was against the Callaghan government which was in favour of devolution in Wales.

The Blair's government introduced Welsh devolution after 1997. Today the Labour government opposes further devolution to Wales including rail. Labour members of the Senedd have been extremely critical of Keir Starmer in regards to further devolution, including First Minister of Wales Eluned Morgan. Lee Waters has accused Secretary of State for Wales Jo Stevens as being the "most anti-devolution Labour Welsh secretary" in half a century. This has encouraged the strategy of clear red water between UK Labour and Welsh Labour.

=== Welsh Conservatives ===
The Welsh Conservatives campaigned against devolution in the 1979 Welsh devolution referendum and the 1997 Welsh devolution referendum. Presently the party is split between pro-devolution and anti-devolution camps. In 2025, leader Darren Millar dismissed calls to scrap Wales' devolved parliament. The party's previous leader Andrew RT Davies faced criticism for raising the debate on devolution at an agricultural show in 2024.

=== Plaid Cymru ===
Plaid Cymru is known for campaigning for Welsh independence as well as devolution. They have seen devolution as a stepping stone towards further autonomy. Some Welsh nationalists oppose devolution on the basis of it preventing full independence and self-governance for Wales. This is partly due to the limited powers granted to the Senedd.

=== Welsh Liberals/Liberal Democrats ===
Opposition to devolution among Liberals has been a minority position. The Welsh Liberal Party originally raised the debate of self-government in the late 19th century. David Lloyd George initially supported Welsh devolution but later opposed it due to concerns caused by the Irish Civil War. Today the Welsh Liberal Democrats are a strongly devolutionist party.

=== Other parties in Wales ===
The UK Independence Party was previously split on the issue of devolution. The Abolish the Welsh Assembly Party are a single-issue party who campaign to abolish devolution. The Brexit Party in Wales fell apart over disagreements over their newly anti-devolution stance with Caroline Jones forming the Independent Alliance for Reform. In September 2025, Reform UK ruled out including abolition of the Senedd in their upcoming manifesto, after Laura Anne Jones, the party's sole Member of the Senedd, made comments that it cannot be ruled out. The Wales Green Party are a pro-independence party.

== Anti-devolution parties ==
- Abolish the Scottish Parliament Party
- Abolish the Welsh Assembly Party
- Scottish Unionist Party (1986)

== See also ==
- Devolution in the United Kingdom
- Federalism in the United Kingdom
