= Abolish the Scottish Parliament Party =

- Official logo registered with the Electoral Commission
- Leader: John Mortimer
- Nominating officer: John Ferguson
- Registered: 31 January 2018
- Ideology: Scottish Parliament abolition; Anti-devolution; Anti-federalism; Scottish unionism
- Scottish Parliament: 0 / 129
- Scottish local government: 0 / 1,227

The Abolish the Scottish Parliament Party is a minor unionist single-issue political party in Scotland. It stands in opposition to devolution and seeks to abolish the Scottish Parliament, and hand its powers to the Secretary of State for Scotland, Scottish local government, and the UK Parliament.

== History ==
Logo used by the party on social media

Although the party was first registered with the Electoral Commission on 31 January 2018, Its founder and current leader, John Mortimer, previously campaigned for Better Together and established the British Unionist Party. He also stood in the Glasgow electoral region in the 2016 Scottish Parliament election, receiving 2,453 votes. Mortimer was critical of the Scottish Conservatives in comments made to the Daily Record, stating that they "have been weak opposition to the SNP on a number of levels." Despite gaining the backing of former UK Independence Party candidates John Ferguson and Mitch William, Mortimer insisted that the party was not a vehicle for former UKIP voters, although UKIP has endorsed abolishing the Scottish Parliament.

=== 2021 Scottish Parliament election ===
On 31 March 2021, the party announced that they would be contesting each of the eight electoral regions in the 2021 Scottish Parliament election. They endorsed tactical voting similar to other nationalist and unionist parties like Alba and All for Unity. In order to deprive the SNP of a majority or a coalition with the Scottish Greens, they encouraged supporters to give their constituency vote to either the Conservatives, Labour, or the Liberal Democrats, and their list vote to Abolish.

In the election, the party did not win any seats, achieving 7,262 votes (0.3%).

=== Subsequent activity ===
John Ferguson was the party's candidate in the August 2025 Barrhead, Liboside and Uplawmoor by-election on East Renfrewshire Council. He came bottom of the poll with 27 first-preference votes (0.6%).

The party ran in one seat in the 2026 Scottish Parliament election.

== Policies ==
Abolish the Scottish Parliament's single issue is the end of Scottish devolution. They claim that the current devolution system does not resemble what was promised in the 1997 referendum.

They decry the £100 million cost of the parliament as "shocking", pledging instead to spend the funding on the NHS and education. They propose returning executive powers to the Office of the Secretary of State for Scotland, returning legislative powers to the UK Parliament in London with a revival of pre-devolution role of the Scottish Grand Committee, and turning the Holyrood parliament building into a museum for the British Armed Forces. The party supports increasing the number of Scottish MPs to the seventy-four which Scotland had until 1950, elected on a proportional system. The party also opposes what it sees as "damaging, unpopular policies" pursued by the SNP, such as their "Named Person" system and the minimum pricing of alcohol.

== Electoral performance ==
=== 2021 Scottish parliament election ===
Region	Candidates	Votes	%
Central Scotland	John Mortimer, Lee McLauchlan	841	0.3
Glasgow	James Dunsmore, Robert Pressley	702	0.2
Highlands and Islands	Jack Malcolm	686	0.3
Lothian	John Leckie, David Nichol	828	0.2
Mid Scotland and Fife	Ian Mann, John Duff	945	0.3
North East Scotland	Callum Buchanan	1,218	0.3
South Scotland	John Ferguson, Simon Bellord	1,126	0.3
West Scotland	Robert Watson	916	0.2

== See also ==
- Abolish the Welsh Assembly Party
