= Single-issue politics =

Political campaigning or support based on one policy goal

Single-issue politics involves political campaigning or political support based on one policy area or idea.

== Political expression ==
One weakness of such an approach is that effective political parties are usually coalitions of factions or advocacy groups. Bringing together political forces based on a single intellectual or cultural common denominator can be unrealistic; though there may be considerable public opinion on one side of an argument, it does not necessarily follow that mobilizing under that one banner will bring results. A defining issue may indeed come to dominate one particular electoral campaign, sufficiently to swing the result. Imposing such an issue may well be what single-issue politics concern; but for the most part success is rather limited, and electorates choose governments for reasons with a broader base.

Single-issue politics may express itself through the formation of a single-issue party, an approach that tends to be more successful in parliamentary systems based on proportional representation than in rigid two-party systems (like that of the United States). Alternatively, it may proceed through political advocacy groups of various kinds, including Lobby groups, pressure groups and other forms of political expression external to normal representative government. Within a broad-based party it may be the concern of a single-issue caucus.

Very visible as it was in Western democracies in the second half of the twentieth century, single-issue politics is hardly a new phenomenon. In the 1880s, the third government of William Ewart Gladstone made British politics in practical terms single-issue, around the Home Rule Bill, leading to a split of the Liberal Party.

== Groups and voters ==
Single-issue politics are a form of litmus test; common examples are abortion, taxation, animal rights, environment, and guns. The National Rifle Association in the United States, which has only one specific interest, is an example of a single-issue group. What differentiates single-issue groups from other interest groups is their intense style of lobbying.

The term single-issue voter has been used to describe people who may make voting decisions based on the candidates' stance on a single issue (e.g., support or opposition to abortion rights, or in support of gun rights or gun control). The existence of single-issue voters can give a distorted impression: a candidate's overall views may not enjoy the same support. For example, a person who votes for a socially liberal Republican candidate, based solely on their support of abortion, may not necessarily share the candidate's other views on social issues, such as gun rights or family values.

== Single-issue parties ==
A single-issue party is a political party which focuses any campaign, efforts, or activism almost exclusively on only a single issue or a very narrow range of issues (e.g. a gun rights organization that might also support knife rights).

In instant-runoff electoral systems which allow unsuccessful parties to designate where their votes are redistributed, single-issue parties may be formed as a way to funnel more votes to another candidate with quite different policies. For instance, in the 1999 New South Wales state election, candidate Malcolm Jones received just 0.2% of the primary vote, but achieved the quota of 4.5% required to win a Legislative Council seat after receiving preferences from a wide range of minor parties (including both the "Gun Owners and Sporting Hunters Rights Party" and the "Animal Liberation Party"); MLC Lee Rhiannon accused many of these parties of being nothing more than fronts.

=== Asia ===
==== Japan ====
The NHK Party opposes the television licence system imposed by NHK, the country's public broadcaster.

=== Europe ===
==== United Kingdom ====
The most electorally successful British single-issue party is the pro-Brexit UK Independence Party (UKIP), which later expanded to support other policies. Its former leader, Nigel Farage, subsequently left UKIP and founded the Brexit Party, which was later renamed Reform UK after the completion of Brexit.

Other single-issue parties in the UK are anti-devolution Abolish the Scottish Parliament Party and Abolish the Welsh Assembly Party, pro re-entry of the country to the European Union Rejoin EU, animal rights advocates Animal Protection Party and the Animal Welfare Party and the pro fox-hunting Countryside Party. There were also the electoral reform advocates No Candidate Deserves My Vote! party, in Scotland, there is another single-issue party, Alliance to Liberate Scotland, which focuses on Scottish Independence.

The National Flood Prevention Party and Party of Women are two single-issue parties with councillors in Windsor and Maidenhead and Maldon respectively.

==== Germany ====
In Germany, Tierschutzpartei and Tierschutz hier! are animal rights parties. There is also the Party for Rejuvenation Research.

==== Poland ====
In 2019, an anti-environmentalist Polish political party called the Party of Drivers (Polish: Partia Kierowców) was formed with the aim of "fighting for the rights of drivers and hauliers".

==== Norway ====
In Norway, there is a party called Patient Focus, which supports the expansion of the hospital in Alta Municipality, Finnmark.

=== United States ===
- The Anti-Masonic Party opposed Freemasonry.
- Rent is Too Damn High is focused on housing.
- Stop Common Core Party (which later folded into the Reform Party) was opposed to the adoption of Common Core educational curriculum in New York State.
- The Free-Soil Party opposed slavery.
- The US Marijuana Party and Legalize Cannabis Now Party are the major parties that focus on marijuana legalization.
- The Approval Voting Party is focused on the implementation of Approval Voting.

=== Oceania ===
In Australia, a number of single-issue parties have been elected to federal and state parliaments such as the Animal Justice Party, Dignity for Disability, the Australian Reason Party, Australian Motoring Enthusiast Party.

== See also ==
- Big tent
- Identity politics
- Issue voting
- Protest vote
- Voting bloc
