= Political make-up of local councils in the United Kingdom =

This article documents the strengths of political parties in the 317 local authorities of England, 32 local authorities of Scotland, 22 principal councils of Wales and 11 local councils of Northern Ireland.

England's 317 local authorities are made up of: 32 London borough councils, 21 county councils and 164 district councils (two tiers of local government which share responsibility for the same physical area), 36 metropolitan district councils, 62 unitary authorities, and 2 sui generis authorities, the City of London Corporation and Council of the Isles of Scilly.

This article does not cover the Greater London Authority or the 15 combined authorities of England (and their respective mayors). It also does not cover the 35 police and crime commissioners or four police, fire and crime commissioners in England and Wales. And it also does not include the thousands of parish/local councils of England, community councils of Scotland and community councils of Wales.

English local authorities have a choice of executive arrangements out of a mayor and cabinet executive, a leader and cabinet executive, a committee system or alternative arrangements approved by the Secretary of State. Councils in England and Northern Ireland run on four year cycles, while councils in Scotland and, from 2022, Wales run on five year cycles. An English local authority's councillors may be elected all at once, by halves or thirds. Because of this disparate system, various local elections take place every year, but changes in party representation arise frequently regardless due to resignations, deaths, by-elections, co-options and changes of affiliation.

== Summary ==
=== Total number of councillors by political party ===
Last full update: 5 March 2026

Party	Total (Note: Last updated on 5 March 2026)	England (Note: Last updated on 5 March 2026)	Wales (Note: Last updated on 5 March 2026)	Scotland (Note: Last updated on 5 March 2026)	Northern Ireland (Note: Last updated on 5 March 2026)
Labour	4,631 / 18,645	3,891	482	258	
Conservative	3,855 / 19,107	3,581	102	172	0
Liberal Democrats	3,361 / 18,645	3,206	67	88	
Reform UK	2,368 / 18,645	2,322	22	23	
Green (E&W)	1,314 / 17,483	1,300	14	n/a (Note: The Green Party of England and Wales do not contest Scottish elections, however, the Scottish Greens, a separate party listed below, hold 36 seats.)	n/a (Note: The Green Party of England and Wales do not contest Northern Irish elections, however, the Green Party Northern Ireland, a separate party listed below, hold 5 seats.)
SNP	414 / 1,226			413	
Plaid Cymru	202 / 1,234		201		
Sinn Féin	144 / 462				144
DUP	120 / 462				120
Alliance	66 / 462				66
Ulster Unionist	52 / 462				52
Restore Britain	38 / 18,645	38	0	0	0
SDLP	36 / 462				36
Aspire	33 / 45	33			
Ashfield Independents	32 / 101	32			
Scottish Greens	32 / 1,227			32	
Canvey Island Independents	14 / 39	14			
Your Party	11 / 18,645	8	0	3	
Havering Residents Association	11 / 55	11			
Great Yarmouth First (Note: Mother party Restore Britain)	10 / 123	10			
TUV	10 / 462				10
Liberal	7 / 18,645	7	0	0	
Green (NI)	5 / 462				5
Advance UK	4 / 18,645	8	0	0	
Mebyon Kernow	3 / 87	3			
Chislehurst Matters	3 / 58	3			
SDP	3 / 18,645	3			
Merton Park Residents Association	2 / 57	2			
People Before Profit	2 / 462				2
PUP	1 / 462				1
Aontú	1 / 462				1
Other parties and independents	2,738 / 19,107	1,894	340	236	25
Vacancies	42	33	5	4	0
Total	19,107	16,169	1,234	1,226	462

=== Political control of local government in England ===
The table below shows which party has political control of each of the 21 non-metropolitan county councils (CC), the 62 unitary authorities (UA), the 36 metropolitan boroughs (MB), the 32 London boroughs (LB), the 164 district councils (DC) and the 2 sui generis entities: the City of London (CL) and the Isles of Scilly (IS). In total, 314 local government councils.

The table differentiates between councils governed by a single party and others where a party leads a coalition that governs the council. Councils not controlled by the Conservatives (CON), Labour (LAB), Liberal Democrats (LDM), Reform UK (RFM) or Greens (GRN) are grouped in the category: OTHER.

Map showing party control of all lower tier local authorities in England as of 09/05/2026.

Map showing party control of all upper tier local authorities in England as of 09/05/2026.

Last full update: 21 August 2025 (Partially updated 9 May 2026)

Party	CC	UA + IS	MB	LB + CL	DC	Total no. of councils	% of all councils
LAB	–	27	21	14	42	101	32.0
LAB-led coalition	-	3	1	–	8	4	1.2
LAB	-	30	22	14	50	105	33.2
CON	3	9	3	8	31	54	17.1
CON-led coalition	–	1	–	–	4	5	1.6
CON	7	10	3	6	35	59	18.7
LDM	4	12	2	3	31	52	16.5
LDM-led coalition	1	6	–	–	17	24	7.6
LDM	5	18	2	3	48	76	24.1
RFM	14	3	9	1	-	27	8.5
RFM-led coalition	-	-	-	-	-	-	-
RFM	9	3	1	1	-	27	8.5
GRN	-	3	-	5	3	11	3.5
GRN-led coalition	-	0	-	-	8	8	2.5
GRN	-	3	-	5	11	19	6.0
OTHER control	–	2	–	2	9	13	4.1
OTHER-led coalition	-	-	–	-	11	11	3.5
OTHER	-	2	–	2	20	24	7.6
Total	21	64	36	33	164	316	100.0

== England: unitary authorities ==
Last full update: 29 July 2026

Unitary authority	Control			Councillors								Cycle	Ref.
Unitary authority	Control			Total	CON	LAB	LDM	RFM	GRN	Other	Vacant	Cycle	Ref.
Bath and North East Somerset	Leader and cabinet	LDM		59	2	6	38		3	9	1	All	URL OCDUK
Bedford	Mayor and cabinet	CON	NOC	46	14	12	13		4	3		All	URL OCDUK
Blackburn with Darwen	Leader and cabinet	LAB		51	5	20		9		17		Thirds	URL OCDUK
Blackpool	Leader and cabinet	LAB		42	11	26		4			1	All	URL OCDUK
Bournemouth, Christchurch and Poole		LDM/IND (coalition)		76	9	8	28	3	5	23 (Note: Christchurch Independents (8) BCP Independent Group (4) Poole People Party (4) Poole Engage Party (2) Moordown Independents Group (2) Independents Group (2) No group (1))		All	URL OCDUK
Bracknell Forest		LAB (minority)		41	10	20	7		3	1		All	URL OCDUK
Brighton & Hove		LAB		54	5	33			11	5 (Note: Brighton and Hove Independents (2))		All	URL OCDUK
Bristol	Committee system	GRN (minority)		70	7	19	9		34	1		All	URL OCDUK
Buckinghamshire	Leader and cabinet	CON		97	50	3	26	2	2	14 (Note: Wycombe Independents (2))		All	URL OCDUK
Central Bedfordshire		IND (minority)		63	20	4	8	2	1	28		All	URL OCDUK
Cheshire East	Committee system	LAB/IND (coalition)		82	32	28	1	1	1	19	1	All	URL OCDUK
Cheshire West and Chester	Leader and cabinet	LAB (minority)		70	20	35	1	3	3	8		All	URL OCDUK
Cornwall	Leader and cabinet	LDM/IND (coalition)		87	7	4	26	20	3	27 (Note: Mebyon Kernow (3) Restore Britain (2))	1	All	URL OCDUK
Cumberland	Leader and cabinet	LAB		46	8	25	4		3	5	1	All	OCDUK
Darlington	Leader and cabinet	LAB/LD (coalition)		50	13	23	2	1	6	5		All	URL OCDUK
Derby		LAB (minority)		51	14	24	3	6 (Note: Reform Derby (5))		4		All	URL OCDUK
Dorset	Leader and cabinet	LD/GRN (coalition)		82	30	2	42		4	4 (Note: Independents for Dorset (4))		All	URL OCDUK
Durham	Leader and cabinet	RFM		98	1	5	15	56	2	19 (Note: Advance UK (1))	1	All	URL OCDUK
East Riding of Yorkshire		CON (minority)		67	24	4	21	3	3	12		All	URL OCDUK
East Surrey (shadow council, assuming full control April 2027)		LDM		72	10		40	5	8	9		All	URL OCDUK
Halton	Leader and cabinet	LAB		54		30	3	16		5		Thirds	URL OCDUK
Hartlepool	Committee system	RFM (minority)		36		14		15		7		Thirds	URL OCDUK
Herefordshire		CON (minority)		53	20	1	12		8	12		All	URL OCDUK
Isle of Wight	Leader and cabinet	RFM (minority)		39	2	1	4	19	2	11		All	URL OCDUK
Kingston upon Hull		LDM (minority)		57		16	26		10	5		Thirds	URL OCDUK
Leicester	Mayor and cabinet	LAB	LAB	54	15	30	3		4	2 (Note: One Leicester (1))	1	All	URL OCDUK
Luton		LAB		48	3	22	14	1		8		All	URL OCDUK
Medway		LAB		59	18	31		3		7		All	URL OCDUK
Middlesbrough	Mayor and cabinet	LAB	LAB	46	4	24	1	2		15		All	URL OCDUK
Milton Keynes		LDM		57	12	18	20	9			1	Thirds	URL OCDUK
North East Lincolnshire		REF (minority)		42	10	11	3	14		4		Thirds	URL OCDUK
North Lincolnshire		CON		43	27	15		1				All	URL OCDUK
North Northamptonshire	Leader and cabinet	RFM		66	11	4	1	39	8	5		All	URL OCDUK
North Somerset		LD/LAB/GRN/IND (coalition)		50	12	10	9	2	8	8 (Note: Portishead Independents (4))	1	All	URL OCDUK
North Yorkshire		CON (minority)		90	41	10	13	5	5	16 (Note: Liberal Party (1))		All	URL OCDUK
Northumberland	Leader and cabinet	CON (minority)		67	28	8	3	19	2	9		All	URL OCDUK
Nottingham	Leader and cabinet	LAB		55		43			1	10 (Note: Nottingham People's Alliance (6) Nottingham Independents (3))	1	All	URL OCDUK
Peterborough		LAB (minority)		60	14	10	8	5	7	16 (Note: Peterborough First (8))	1	Thirds	URL OCDUK
Plymouth		LAB		57	3	30		16	3	5		Thirds	URL OCDUK
Portsmouth		LDM (minority)		42	3	3	23	12		1		Thirds	URL OCDUK
Reading		LAB		48	5	29	3		11			Thirds	URL OCDUK
Redcar & Cleveland	Leader and cabinet	LAB (minority)		59	13	20	10	1		15	1	All	URL OCDUK
Rutland	Leader and cabinet	LDM (minority)		27	7	2	10			8		All	URL OCDUK
Shropshire	Leader and cabinet	LDM		74	7	4	40	15	4	4		All	URL OCDUK
Slough		CON/LD (coalition)		42	19	11	10		1	1		All	URL OCDUK
Somerset		LDM		110	31	5	62	3	4	4	1	All	URL OCDUK
South Gloucestershire		LD/LAB (coalition)		61	23	14	19		1	4		All	URL OCDUK
Southampton		LAB (minority)		51	6	24	8	8	5			Thirds	URL OCDUK
Southend-on-Sea		LAB/GRN/LD (coalition)		51	11	17	3	11	4	5		Thirds	URL OCDUK
Stockton-on-Tees	Leader and cabinet	LAB (minority)		56	26	22				8 (Note: Thornaby Independent Association (4) Ingleby Barwick Independent Society (3))		All	URL OCDUK
Stoke-on-Trent		LAB		44	8	27		5		4 (Note: City Independents (1) The Potteries Party (1))		All	URL OCDUK
Swindon		CON (minority)		57	23	19	1	14		2		Thirds	URL OCDUK
Telford and Wrekin		LAB		54	8	37	6			3		All	URL OCDUK
Thurrock		RFM		49	2	4		43				Thirds	URL OCDUK
Torbay		CON (minority)		36	17		15			4		All	URL OCDUK
Warrington	Leader and cabinet	LAB		58	2	40	11			5		All	URL OCDUK
West Berkshire		LDM		43	11	1	28		2	1		All	URL OCDUK
West Northamptonshire	Leader and cabinet	RFM		76	17	8	7	39		5		All	URL OCDUK
West Surrey (shadow council, assuming full control April 2027)		LDM		90	20		56	9		5		All	URL OCDUK
Westmorland and Furness	Leader and cabinet	LDM		65	9	15	35	1	1	4		All	URL OCDUK
Wiltshire	Leader and cabinet	LDM (minority)		98	38	1	43	10		6		All	URL OCDUK
Windsor and Maidenhead		LDM		41	7		21	1		12 (Note: The Borough First (3) Old Windsor Residents Association (2) National Flood Prevention Party (1))		All	URL OCDUK
Wokingham		LDM		54	19	5	29		1			Thirds	URL OCDUK
York		LAB		47	3	24	19			1		All	URL OCDUK

=== Metropolitan district councils ===
Last full update: 11 May 2026

Metropolitan district council	Control			Councillors								Cycle	Ref.
Metropolitan district council	Control			Total	LAB	CON	LDM	GRN	RFM	Other	Vacant	Cycle	Ref.
Barnsley	Leader and cabinet	RFM		63	11		8		42	2		Thirds	URL OCDUK
Birmingham	Leader and cabinet	NOC		101	17	16	12	19	22	13	2	All	URL OCDUK
Bolton	Leader and cabinet	LAB (minority)		60	20	11	5	3	10	11		Thirds	URL OCDUK
Bradford	Leader and cabinet	NOC		90	17	18	1	9	29	13	3	Thirds	URL OCDUK
Bury	Leader and cabinet	LAB		51	30	3			6	11	1	Thirds	URL OCDUK
Calderdale	Leader and cabinet	RFM		51	8	0	2	7	34	3		Thirds	URL OCDUK
Coventry	Leader and cabinet	NOC		54	24	6		4	20			Thirds	URL OCDUK
Doncaster	Mayor and cabinet	LAB	RFM	55	12	6			34	3 (Note: Advance UK (2))		All	URL OCDUK
Dudley	Leader and cabinet	CON (minority)		72	15	27	4		23	3		Thirds	URL OCDUK
Gateshead	Leader and cabinet	RFM		66	12		13	3	38			Thirds	URL OCDUK
Kirklees	Leader and cabinet	NOC		69		9	5	12	29	14		Thirds	URL OCDUK
Knowsley	Leader and cabinet	LAB		45	24		3	8	4	6		Thirds	URL OCDUK
Leeds	Leader and cabinet	NOC		99	57	14	6	11	10	10		Thirds	URL OCDUK
Liverpool	Leader and cabinet	LAB	LAB	85	57		13	4		11 (Note: Liberal Party (3) Your Party (3))		All	URL OCDUK
Manchester	Leader and cabinet	LAB		96	63		4	21	7	1		Thirds	URL OCDUK
Newcastle upon Tyne	Leader and cabinet	NOC		78	2		25	24	24	3		Thirds	URL OCDUK
North Tyneside	Mayor and cabinet	LAB	LAB	60	38	8		2	11	1		Thirds	URL OCDUK
Oldham	Leader and cabinet	LAB (minority)		60	18	4	6		16	16 (Note: Failsworth Independent Party (2))		Thirds	URL OCDUK
Rochdale	Leader and cabinet	LAB		60	31	7	3		15	4 (Note: Workers Party (2) Middleton Independents (2))		Thirds	URL OCDUK
Rotherham	Leader and cabinet	LAB		59	31	13	3	1	1	10		All	URL OCDUK
Salford	Mayor and cabinet	LAB		60	34	6	1	3	14	2	1	Thirds	URL OCDUK
Sandwell	Leader and cabinet	RFM		72	28			2	41	1		Thirds	URL OCDUK
Sefton	Leader and cabinet	LAB		66	36		17	3	5	5		Thirds	URL OCDUK
Sheffield	Committee system	NOC		84	25		22	20	13	4		Thirds	URL OCDUK
Solihull	Leader and cabinet	NOC		51		24	6	4	17			Thirds	URL OCDUK
South Tyneside	Leader and cabinet	RFM		54	1			10	41	2		Thirds	URL OCDUK
St Helens	Leader and cabinet	RFM		48	2	1	3		34	6	2	All	URL OCDUK
Stockport	Leader and cabinet	LDM		63	14	1	33	4	2	9 (Note: Edgeley Community Association (3) Heald Green Ratepayers (3))		Thirds	URL OCDUK
Sunderland	Leader and cabinet	RFM		75	5		12		57	1		Thirds	URL OCDUK
Tameside	Leader and cabinet	NOC		57	25	5			19	8		Thirds	URL OCDUK
Trafford	Leader and cabinet	LAB		63	35	12	7	7	2			Thirds	URL OCDUK
Wakefield	Leader and cabinet	RFM		63	1	1	2	1	58			Thirds	URL OCDUK
Walsall	Leader and cabinet	RFM		60	1	10			40	9		Thirds	URL OCDUK
Wigan	Leader and cabinet	LAB		75	42				25	8		Thirds	URL OCDUK
Wirral	Committee system	LAB (minority)		66	27	14	6	14	3	2		All	URL OCDUK
Wolverhampton	Leader and cabinet	LAB		60	35	10			13	2		Thirds	URL OCDUK

=== London borough councils ===
Map showing party control of each borough council after the 2026 local elections.

Last full update: 11 May 2026

London borough councils	Control			Councillors								Cycle	Ref.
London borough councils	Control			Total	LAB	CON	LDM	GRN	RFM	Other	Vacant	Cycle	Ref.
Barking and Dagenham	Leader and cabinet	LAB		51	38			4	9			All	URL OCDUK
Barnet	Leader and cabinet	NOC		63	31	31		1				All	URL OCDUK
Bexley	Leader and cabinet	CON		45	9	29			7			All	URL OCDUK
Brent	Leader and cabinet	NOC		57	26	11	11	9				All	URL OCDUK
Bromley	Leader and cabinet	CON		58	8	35	6		6	8 (Note: Chislehurst Matters (3))		All	URL OCDUK
Camden	Leader and cabinet	LAB		55	30	3	10	10		1	1	All	URL OCDUK
Croydon	Mayor and cabinet	CON	NOC	70	30	28	2	7	2	1		All	URL OCDUK
Ealing	Leader and cabinet	LAB		70	46	5	13	5		1		All	URL OCDUK
Enfield	Leader and cabinet	NOC		63	27	31		5				All	URL OCDUK
Greenwich	Leader and cabinet	LAB		55	35	6		13	1			All	URL OCDUK
Hackney	Mayor and cabinet	GRN	GRN	57	9	6		42				All	URL OCDUK
Hammersmith and Fulham	Leader and cabinet	LAB		50	38	12					1	All	URL OCDUK
Haringey	Leader and cabinet	NOC		57	21		8	28				All	URL OCDUK
Harrow	Leader and cabinet	CON		55	12	42				1		All	URL OCDUK
Havering	Leader and cabinet	RFM		55	2				39	14 (Note: Havering Residents Association (11) Harold Wood Hill Park Residents Association (3))		All	URL OCDUK
Hillingdon	Leader and cabinet	CON		53	16	30		1	4		2	All	URL OCDUK
Hounslow	Leader and cabinet	LAB		62	32	17	1	3	8	1		All	URL OCDUK
Islington	Leader and cabinet	LAB		51	32			19				All	URL OCDUK
Kensington and Chelsea	Leader and cabinet	CON		50	13	34	3					All	URL OCDUK
Kingston upon Thames	Committee	LDM		48		2	44			2 (Note: Kingston Independent Residents (2))		All	URL OCDUK
Lambeth	Leader and cabinet	NOC		63	26		8	28		1		All	URL OCDUK
Lewisham	Mayor and cabinet	GRN	GRN	54	14			39		1		All	URL OCDUK
Merton	Leader and cabinet	LAB		57	32	4	19			2 (Note: Merton Park Ward Residents Association (2))		All	URL OCDUK
Newham	Mayor and cabinet	LAB	NOC	66	26			16		24 (Note: Newham Independents (24))		All	URL OCDUK
Redbridge	Leader and cabinet	LAB		63	43	5		5	1	9		All	URL OCDUK
Richmond upon Thames	Leader and cabinet	LDM		54			54					All	URL OCDUK
Southwark	Leader and cabinet	NOC		63	29		12	22				All	URL OCDUK
Sutton	Committee system	LDM		54	1		51		2	1		All	URL OCDUK
Tower Hamlets	Mayor and cabinet	Aspire	Aspire	45	5	1	1	1	5	33 (Note: Aspire (33))		All	URL OCDUK
Waltham Forest	Leader and cabinet	GRN		60	15	14		31				All	URL OCDUK
Wandsworth	Leader and cabinet	NOC		58	28	29				1		All	URL OCDUK
Westminster	Leader and cabinet	CON		54	22	32						All	URL OCDUK

=== England: sui generis councils ===
Last full update: 16 July 2025

Sui generis council	Control	Councillors				Cycle	Ref.
Sui generis council	Control	Total	LAB	Other	Vacant	Cycle	Ref.
City of London Corporation	IND	125	7	118 (Note: Temple & Farringdon Together (10))		All	URL
Isles of Scilly	IND	16		16		All	URL OCDUK

== England: two-tier county and district councils ==
=== County councils ===
Last full update: 11 May 2026

County council	Control		Councillors								Cycle	Ref.
County council	Control		Total	CON	LDM	LAB	RFM	GRN	Other	Vacant	Cycle	Ref.
Cambridgeshire	Committee	LDM	61	10	32	5	8	3	2	1	All	URL OCDUK
Derbyshire	Leader and cabinet	RFM	64	10	3	2	42	3	4		All	URL OCDUK
Devon	Leader and cabinet	NOP (LDM+GRN+IND co)	60	7	27		16	6	4		All	URL OCDUK
East Sussex	Leader and cabinet	NOC	50	3	13		22	11	1		All	URL OCDUK
Essex	Leader and cabinet	RFM	78	14	6	1	52	1	4		All	URL OCDUK
Gloucestershire	Leader and cabinet	LDM (minority)	55	6	27	1	10	9	2		All	URL OCDUK
Hampshire	Leader and cabinet	NOC	78	27	26	1	20	1	3		All	URL OCDUK
Hertfordshire	Leader and cabinet	LDM (minority)	78	22	32	4	13	5	2		All	URL OCDUK
Kent	Leader and cabinet	RFM	81	6	12	2	47	5	9 (Note: Restore Britain (7))		All	URL OCDUK
Lancashire	Leader and cabinet	RFM	84	8	5	5	53	3	10 (Note: Your Party (3) Our West Lancashire (2))		All	URL OCDUK
Leicestershire	Leader and cabinet	RFM (minority)	55	15	11	2	25	1	1		All	URL OCDUK
Lincolnshire	Leader and cabinet	RFM	70	15	5	3	43		4 (Note: Lincolnshire Independents (1))		All	URL OCDUK
Norfolk	Leader and cabinet	NOC	84	8	13	1	40	12	10		All	URL OCDUK
Nottinghamshire	Leader and cabinet	RFM	66	18		4	41		3 (Note: Ashfield Independents (1) Broxtowe Alliance (1) Broxtowe Independent Group (1))		All	URL OCDUK
Oxfordshire	Leader and cabinet	LDM	69	10	34	12	1	7	5 (Note: Independent Oxford Alliance (1) Henley Residents (1))		All	URL OCDUK
Staffordshire	Leader and cabinet	RFM	62	11		1	45	1	4 (Note: Stafford Borough Independents (1))		All	URL OCDUK
Suffolk	Leader and cabinet	RFM	70	9	2	3	41	13	2		All	URL OCDUK
Surrey	Leader and cabinet	CON (minority)	81	38	18	2	2	2	17 (Note: Residents Associations of Epsom and Ewell (4) Farnham Residents (3) Residents for Guildford and Villages (1) Ashtead Independents (1) Nork Residents' Association (1) Thames Ditton / Weston Green Residents' Association (1) The Molesey Residents Association (1))	1	All	URL OCDUK
Warwickshire	Leader and cabinet	RFM (minority)	57	9	14	3	22	6	3 (Note: Whitnash Residents Association (1))		All	URL OCDUK
West Sussex	Leader and cabinet	NOC	70	11	23	5	23	7	1		All	URL OCDUK
Worcestershire	Leader and cabinet	NOC (GRN+CON+LDM co)	57	12	6	2	25	8	4		All	URL OCDUK

=== District councils ===
Last full update: 21 January 2026

District council	County council	Control			Councillors								Cycle	Ref.
District council	County council	Control			Total	CON	LDM	LAB	GRN	RFM	Other	Vacant	Cycle	Ref.
Adur	West Sussex	Leader and cabinet	LAB		29	6		17	2		4		Halves	URL OCDUK
Amber Valley	Derbyshire	Leader and cabinet	NOC		42	7	1	19	6	3	6 (Note: Your Party (2))		All	URL OCDUK
Arun	West Sussex	Committee system	NOC		54	19	14	8	5	2	6		All	URL OCDUK
Ashfield	Nottinghamshire	Leader and cabinet	IND		35	1				3	31 (Note: Ashfield Independents (30))		All	URL OCDUK
Ashford	Kent	Leader and cabinet	NOC		47	16		8	11		12 (Note: Ashford Independents (9))		All	URL OCDUK
Babergh	Suffolk	Alternative arrangements	NOC		32	7	4	1	10	1	9		All	URL OCDUK
Basildon	Essex	Leader and cabinet	LAB (minority)		42	13		16		2	11 (Note: Wickford Independents (4))		Thirds	URL OCDUK
Basingstoke and Deane	Hampshire	Leader and cabinet	NOC		54	13	11	10	2	1	16 (Note: Basingstoke & Deane Independents (11) All In Party (1))	1	Thirds	URL OCDUK
Bassetlaw	Nottinghamshire	Leader and cabinet	LAB		48	4		35		5	4		All	URL OCDUK
Blaby	Leicestershire	Leader and cabinet	CON (minority)		36	18	8	5	2	1	2		All	URL OCDUK
Bolsover	Derbyshire	Leader and cabinet	LAB		37	1		22		2	12		All	URL OCDUK
Boston	Lincolnshire	Leader and cabinet	NOC		30	4	1			1	24 (Note: Boston Independent (3) Blue Revolution Party (1))		All	URL OCDUK
Braintree	Essex	Leader and cabinet	CON		49	25		9	4		10 (Note: Halstead Residents Association (3))	1	All	URL OCDUK
Breckland	Norfolk	Leader and cabinet	CON		49	28		9	1	5	6		All	URL OCDUK
Brentwood	Essex	Alternative arrangements	NOC		39	16	17	3		1	2		Thirds	URL OCDUK
Broadland	Norfolk	Leader and cabinet	NOC		47	19	14	7	4	1	2		All	URL OCDUK
Bromsgrove	Worcestershire	Leader and cabinet	NOC		31	11	7	6			7		All	URL OCDUK
Broxbourne	Hertfordshire	Leader and cabinet	CON		30	25		3		2			Thirds	URL OCDUK
Broxtowe	Nottinghamshire	Committee system	IND (minority)		44	10	3	7			24 (Note: Broxtowe Alliance (18) Broxtowe Ind. (5))		All	URL OCDUK
Burnley	Lancashire	Leader and cabinet	NOC		45	7	7	13	5	2	11		Thirds	URL OCDUK
Cambridge	Cambridgeshire	Leader and cabinet	LAB		42	1	12	23	5		1 (Note: Your Party (1))		Thirds	URL OCDUK
Cannock Chase	Staffordshire	Leader and cabinet	LAB		36	10		19	4	2		1	Thirds	URL OCDUK
Canterbury	Kent	Committee system	NOC		39	8	8	18	4		1		All	URL OCDUK
Castle Point	Essex	Leader and cabinet	NOC		39					1	38 (Note: The People's Independent Party (24) Canvey Island Independent Party (14))		All	URL OCDUK
Charnwood	Leicestershire	Leader and cabinet	LAB (minority)		52	23		20	8		1		All	URL OCDUK
Chelmsford	Essex	Leader and cabinet	LDM		57	19	32			1	5 (Note: Independent Network (1))		All	URL OCDUK
Cheltenham	Gloucestershire	Leader and cabinet	LDM		40		36		3		1		Halves	URL OCDUK
Cherwell	Oxfordshire	Leader and cabinet	NOC		48	12	17	11	4		4		Thirds	URL OCDUK
Chesterfield	Derbyshire	Leader and cabinet	LAB		40		12	28					All	URL OCDUK
Chichester	West Sussex	Leader and cabinet	LDM		36	5	25		2		4 (Note: Local Alliance (4))		All	URL OCDUK
Chorley	Lancashire	Leader and cabinet	LAB		42	4		36		1	1		Thirds	URL OCDUK
Colchester	Essex	Leader and cabinet	NOC		51	19	14	14	3		1		Thirds	URL OCDUK
Cotswold	Gloucestershire	Leader and cabinet	LDM		34	10	21		1		1	1	All	URL OCDUK
Crawley	West Sussex	Leader and cabinet	LAB		36	11		25					Thirds	URL OCDUK
Dacorum	Hertfordshire	Leader and cabinet	LDM (minority)		51	18	17	4			12		All	URL OCDUK
Dartford	Kent	Leader and cabinet	CON		42	28		10	1	2	1		All	URL OCDUK
Derbyshire Dales	Derbyshire	Alternative arrangements	NOC		34	9	12	6	4		3		All	URL OCDUK
Dover	Kent	Leader and cabinet	LAB (minority)		32	14		12			6		All	URL OCDUK
East Cambridgeshire	Cambridgeshire	Alternative arrangements	CON (minority)		28	14	13				1		All	URL OCDUK
East Devon	Devon	Leader and cabinet	NOC		60	14	21		2		23 (Note: Liberal Party (1))		All	URL OCDUK
East Hampshire	Hampshire	Leader and cabinet	NOC		43	18	14	1	2		8 (Note: Whitehill & Bordon Community Party (6))		All	URL OCDUK
East Hertfordshire	Hertfordshire	Leader and cabinet	NOC		50	14	10	5	16	2	3		All	URL OCDUK
East Lindsey	Lincolnshire	Leader and cabinet	CON (minority)		55	26	1	6	1	6	15		All	URL OCDUK
East Staffordshire	Staffordshire	Leader and cabinet	LAB		37	15		21			1		All	URL OCDUK
East Suffolk	Suffolk	Leader and cabinet	NOC		55	15	9	12	16		3		All	URL OCDUK
Eastbourne	East Sussex	Leader and cabinet	LDM		27	8	19						All	URL OCDUK
Eastleigh	Hampshire	Leader and cabinet	LDM		39	1	35				3		Thirds	URL OCDUK
Elmbridge	Surrey	Leader and cabinet	NOC		48	10	20			1	17 (Note: Thames Ditton / Weston Green Residents' Association (4) The Molesey Residents Association (3) Esher Residents Association (3) Hinchley Wood Residents Association (2) The Walton Society (1) Weybridge & St. George's Independents (1))		Thirds	URL OCDUK
Epping Forest	Essex	Leader and cabinet	CON (minority)		54	26	7	1	1	1	18 (Note: Loughton Residents Association (13))		Thirds	URL OCDUK
Epsom and Ewell	Surrey	Alternative arrangements	IND		35	3	3	3			26 (Note: Residents Associations of Epsom and Ewell (25))		All	URL OCDUK
Erewash	Derbyshire	Leader and cabinet	LAB		47	16	1	25	1	2	2		All	URL OCDUK
Exeter	Devon	Leader and cabinet	LAB		39	2	4	22	7	2	2		Thirds	URL OCDUK
Fareham	Hampshire	Leader and cabinet	CON		32	24	6	1			1		Halves	URL OCDUK
Fenland	Cambridgeshire	Leader and cabinet	CON		43	35	2				6		All	URL OCDUK
Folkestone and Hythe	Kent	Leader and cabinet	NOC		30	5	2	8	11	1	3		All	URL OCDUK
Forest of Dean	Gloucestershire	Leader and cabinet	GRN (minority)		38	6	1	4	15	2	10		All	URL OCDUK
Fylde	Lancashire	Leader and cabinet	CON		37	21	2	2			12		All	URL OCDUK
Gedling	Nottinghamshire	Leader and cabinet	LAB		41	9	4	25			3		All	URL OCDUK
Gloucester	Gloucestershire	Leader and cabinet	LDM (minority)		39	11	17	7			4		All	URL OCDUK
Gosport	Hampshire	Alternative arrangements	LDM		28	11	13	2		1	1		Halves	URL OCDUK
Gravesham	Kent	Leader and cabinet	LAB		39	12		22		5			All	URL OCDUK
Great Yarmouth	Norfolk	Leader and cabinet	CON (minority)		39	19		18			2		All	URL OCDUK
Guildford	Surrey	Leader and cabinet	LDM		48	10	25	3			10 (Note: Residents for Guildford and Villages (7) Guildford Greenbelt Group (3))		All	URL OCDUK
Harborough	Leicestershire	Leader and cabinet	NOC		34	16	9	3	3	1	2	1	All	URL OCDUK
Harlow	Essex	Alternative arrangements	CON		33	17		15		1			Thirds	URL OCDUK
Hart	Hampshire	Leader and cabinet	NOC		33	9	12				12 (Note: Hart Community Campaign (11))		Thirds	URL OCDUK
Hastings	East Sussex	Leader and cabinet	NOC		32	5		9	12		6 (Note: Your Party (6))		Halves	URL OCDUK
Havant	Hampshire	Leader and cabinet	NOC		36	8	5	9	6	5	3		Thirds	URL OCDUK
Hertsmere	Hertfordshire	Leader and cabinet	NOC		39	13	8	12		2	4		All	URL OCDUK
High Peak	Derbyshire	Leader and cabinet	LAB		43	9	1	29	2	1	1		All	URL OCDUK
Hinckley and Bosworth	Leicestershire	Leader and cabinet	LDM		34	9	23	1			1		All	URL OCDUK
Horsham	West Sussex	Leader and cabinet	LDM		48	10	27		9	1	1		All	URL OCDUK
Huntingdonshire	Cambridgeshire	Leader and cabinet	NOC		52	18	14	3	1		16 (Note: St. Neots Independents (4))		All	URL OCDUK
Hyndburn	Lancashire	Leader and cabinet	LAB		35	13		21	1				Thirds	URL OCDUK
Ipswich	Suffolk	Leader and cabinet	LAB		48	7	3	38					Thirds	URL OCDUK
King's Lynn and West Norfolk	Norfolk	Leader and cabinet	NOC		55	19	3	7	1	5	20 (Note: Your Party (1))		All	URL OCDUK
Lancaster	Lancashire	Leader and cabinet	NOC		61	5	7	20	23		6 (Note: Morecambe Bay Independents (3))		All	URL OCDUK
Lewes	East Sussex	Leader and cabinet	NOC		41		15	8	17		1		All	URL OCDUK
Lichfield	Staffordshire	Leader and cabinet	CON (minority)		47	21	7	15	1	1	2		All	URL OCDUK
Lincoln	Lincolnshire	Leader and cabinet	LAB		33	5	6	21			1		Thirds	URL OCDUK
Maidstone	Kent	Leader and cabinet	NOC		49	13	12	6	10	3	5		All	URL OCDUK
Maldon	Essex	Leader and cabinet	IND (minority)		31	10	7	1			13 (Note: Maldon Independents (5) Party of Women (1))		All	URL OCDUK
Malvern Hills	Worcestershire	Leader and cabinet	NOC		31	7	3	1	7		13 (Note: Malvern Hills Independents (3))		All	URL OCDUK
Mansfield	Nottinghamshire	Mayor and cabinet	LAB	LAB	36	4		26		3	3		All	URL OCDUK
Melton	Leicestershire	Alternative arrangements	NOC		28	11	1	6			10		All	URL OCDUK
Mid Devon	Devon	Leader and cabinet	LDM		42	3	35		3		1		All	URL OCDUK
Mid Suffolk	Suffolk	Leader and cabinet	GRN		34	3	4		23		4		All	URL OCDUK
Mid Sussex	West Sussex	Leader and cabinet	NOC		48	18	19	1	4		6		All	URL OCDUK
Mole Valley	Surrey	Leader and cabinet	LDM		39	2	31				6 (Note: Ashtead Independents (6))		Thirds	URL OCDUK
New Forest	Hampshire	Leader and cabinet	CON		48	25	14	1	2	1	5		All	URL OCDUK
Newark and Sherwood	Nottinghamshire	Leader and cabinet	LAB (minority)		39	12	3	10	1	2	11		All	URL OCDUK
Newcastle-under-Lyme	Staffordshire	Leader and cabinet	CON		44	26		17		1			All	URL OCDUK
North Devon	Devon	Leader and cabinet	LDM		42	7	23		3		8	1	All	URL OCDUK
North East Derbyshire	Derbyshire	Leader and cabinet	LAB		53	16		27	1	1	8		All	URL OCDUK
North Hertfordshire	Hertfordshire	Leader and cabinet	LAB (minority)		51	7	20	23			1		All	URL OCDUK
North Kesteven	Lincolnshire	Leader and cabinet	CON		43	25	1	2		2	13 (Note: Lincolnshire Independents (8))	1	All	URL OCDUK
North Norfolk	Norfolk	Leader and cabinet	LDM		40	11	26				3		All	URL OCDUK
North Warwickshire	Warwickshire	Alternative arrangements	CON (minority)		35	17		11		2	5		All	URL OCDUK
North West Leicestershire	Leicestershire	Leader and cabinet	NOC		38	12	5	17		1	3		All	URL OCDUK
Norwich	Norfolk	Leader and cabinet	GRN		39		3	12	21	2	1		Thirds	URL OCDUK
Nuneaton and Bedworth	Warwickshire	Leader and cabinet	LAB (minority)		38	17	1	18	2				Halves	URL OCDUK
Oadby and Wigston	Leicestershire	Alternative arrangements	LDM		26	5	16				5		All	URL OCDUK
Oxford	Oxfordshire	Leader and cabinet	LAB (minority)		48		9	21	9		9 (Note: Independent Oxford Alliance (4))		Halves	URL OCDUK
Pendle	Lancashire	Leader and cabinet	IND (minority)		33	11	9			1	12		Thirds	URL OCDUK
Preston	Lancashire	Leader and cabinet	LAB		48	5	14	26		1	2 (Note: Your Party (1))		Thirds	URL OCDUK
Redditch	Worcestershire	Leader and cabinet	LAB		27	5		18	1		3		Thirds	URL OCDUK
Reigate and Banstead	Surrey	Leader and cabinet	CON (minority)		45	17	4		13		11 (Note: Nork Residents' Association (3) Tattenhams & Preston Residents (3))		Thirds	URL OCDUK
Ribble Valley	Lancashire	Alternative arrangements	CON (minority)		40	17	6	5	2	1	9		All	URL OCDUK
Rochford	Essex	Leader and cabinet	NOC		39	10	8		1		20 (Note: Rochford Residents (8))		Thirds	URL OCDUK
Rossendale	Lancashire	Leader and cabinet	LAB		30	5		19	3	1	2 (Note: Community First (1))		Thirds	URL OCDUK
Rother	East Sussex	Leader and cabinet	NOC		38	10	9	7	3		9 (Note: Rother Association of Independent Councillors (6))		All	URL OCDUK
Rugby	Warwickshire	Leader and cabinet	LAB (minority)		42	17	10	15					Thirds	URL OCDUK
Runnymede	Surrey	Alternative arrangements	NOC		41	12	6	8	3	3	9 (Note: Runnymede Independent Residents Group (4))		Thirds	URL OCDUK
Rushcliffe	Nottinghamshire	Leader and cabinet	CON		44	23	1	9	2	1	8 (Note: Rushcliffe Independents (2))		All	URL OCDUK
Rushmoor	Hampshire	Leader and cabinet	LAB (minority)		39	14	3	16			6		Thirds	URL OCDUK
Sevenoaks	Kent	Leader and cabinet	CON (minority)		54	21	14		4	2	11	2	All	URL OCDUK
South Cambridgeshire	Cambridgeshire	Leader and cabinet	LDM		45	8	34				2	1	All	URL OCDUK
South Derbyshire	Derbyshire	Alternative arrangements	LAB		36	11	2	21			2		All	URL OCDUK
South Hams	Devon	Leader and cabinet	LDM		31	7	19	1	3		1		All	URL OCDUK
South Holland	Lincolnshire	Leader and cabinet	CON		37	19				5	13 (Note: South Holland Independents (9))		All	URL OCDUK
South Kesteven	Lincolnshire	Leader and cabinet	NOC		56	17	3	2	2	5	27		All	URL OCDUK
South Norfolk	Norfolk	Leader and cabinet	CON (minority)		46	22	11	9	1		2	1	All	URL OCDUK
South Oxfordshire	Oxfordshire	Leader and cabinet	LDM		36	1	21	3	8		3 (Note: Henley Residents Group (3))		All	URL OCDUK
South Ribble	Lancashire	Leader and cabinet	LAB		50	16	5	28		1			All	URL OCDUK
South Staffordshire	Staffordshire	Leader and cabinet	CON		42	29	4	2	2		5		All	URL OCDUK
Spelthorne	Surrey	Leader and cabinet	NOC		39	16	11	6	1		5		All	URL OCDUK
St Albans	Hertfordshire	Leader and cabinet	LDM		56	4	46	2	3		1		Thirds	URL OCDUK
Stafford	Staffordshire	Leader and cabinet	NOC		40	15	1	12	5		7 (Note: Stafford Borough Independents (7))		All	URL OCDUK
Staffordshire Moorlands	Staffordshire	Leader and cabinet	LAB (minority)		56	20	1	21	2	1	11		All	URL OCDUK
Stevenage	Hertfordshire	Leader and cabinet	LAB		39	1	6	30		2			Thirds	URL OCDUK
Stratford-on-Avon	Warwickshire	Leader and cabinet	LDM		41	9	25		3	2	2		All	URL OCDUK
Stroud	Gloucestershire	Committee System	GRN (minority)		51	6	2	17	24		2		All	URL OCDUK
Surrey Heath	Surrey	Leader and cabinet	LDM		35	6	23	2			4		All	URL OCDUK
Swale	Kent	Committee system	NOC		47	10	5	15	2	5	10 (Note: Swale Independents (8))		All	URL OCDUK
Tamworth	Staffordshire	Leader and cabinet	LAB		30	4		15	1		8	2	Thirds	URL OCDUK
Tandridge	Surrey	Leader and cabinet	IND (minority)		43	5	12			1	25 (Note: Oxted and Limpsfield Residents Group (8) South Godstone Residents' Association (3) Burstow, Horne and Outwood Residents (3) Dormansland and Felbridge Residents (2) Lingfield and Crowhurst Residents (2) Bletchingley and Nutfield Residents (1) Whyteleafe Residents Group (1))		Thirds	URL OCDUK
Teignbridge	Devon	Leader and cabinet	LDM		47	9	25			1	12		All	URL OCDUK
Tendring	Essex	Leader and cabinet	NOC		48	13	4	7		7	17 (Note: Tendring First (1))		All	URL OCDUK
Test Valley	Hampshire	Leader and cabinet	CON		43	25	17				1		All	URL OCDUK
Tewkesbury	Gloucestershire	Committee system	NOC		38	9	16		4	1	8 (Note: Tewkesbury and Twyning Independents (2))		All	URL OCDUK
Thanet	Kent	Leader and cabinet	LAB		56	14		29	7	3	3 (Note: Thanet Independents (2))		All	URL OCDUK
Three Rivers	Hertfordshire	Leader and cabinet	LDM (minority)		39	11	19	3	3		3		Thirds	URL OCDUK
Tonbridge and Malling	Kent	Leader and cabinet	CON (minority)		44	21	11	2	8		2 (Note: Kent Independent Alliance (2))		All	URL OCDUK
Torridge	Devon	Alternative arrangements	IND		36	5	12	2	4		13		All	URL OCDUK
Tunbridge Wells	Kent	Leader and cabinet	LDM		39	8	22	5			4 (Note: Tunbridge Wells Alliance (3))		Thirds	URL OCDUK
Uttlesford	Essex	Leader and cabinet	IND		39	11	4			1	23 (Note: Residents for Uttlesford (21))		All	URL OCDUK
Vale of White Horse	Oxfordshire	Leader and cabinet	LDM		38		32		3		2	1	All	URL OCDUK
Warwick	Warwickshire	Leader and cabinet	NOC		44	5	10	7	15		5 (Note: Whitnash Residents Association (3))		All	URL OCDUK
Watford	Hertfordshire	Mayor and cabinet	LDM	LDM	36		30	6					Thirds	URL OCDUK
Waverley	Surrey	Leader and cabinet	NOC		50	11	24		1		14 (Note: Farnham Residents (12))		All	URL OCDUK
Wealden	East Sussex	Leader and cabinet	NOC		45	10	11	2	11		11		All	URL OCDUK
Welwyn Hatfield	Hertfordshire	Leader and cabinet	NOC		48	12	16	17	2		1		Thirds	URL OCDUK
West Devon	Devon	Alternative arrangements	NOC		31	10	6	1	3		11		All	URL OCDUK
West Lancashire	Lancashire	Leader and cabinet	LAB (minority)		45	14		21			10 (Note: Our West Lancashire (7) Your Party (1))		Thirds	URL OCDUK
West Lindsey	Lincolnshire	Alternative arrangements	LDM (minority)		36	13	16			1	6 (Note: Lincolnshire Independents (2) Consensus (1))		All	URL OCDUK
West Oxfordshire	Oxfordshire	Leader and cabinet	NOC		49	13	21	10	4		1		Thirds	URL OCDUK
West Suffolk	Suffolk	Leader and cabinet	NOC		64	25	1	15	1	3	19 (Note: West Suffolk Independents (8))		All	URL OCDUK
Winchester	Hampshire	Leader and cabinet	LDM		45	8	32		4		1		Thirds	URL OCDUK
Woking	Surrey	Leader and cabinet	LDM		30		24	1			5		Thirds	URL OCDUK
Worcester	Worcestershire	Leader and cabinet	LAB (minority)		35		5	17	11	1	1		All	URL OCDUK
Worthing	West Sussex	Leader and cabinet	LAB		37	9		21	2	2	3		Thirds	URL OCDUK
Wychavon	Worcestershire	Leader and cabinet	CON		43	26	8	1	6	1	1		All	URL OCDUK
Wyre	Lancashire	Leader and cabinet	CON		50	27		15		4	4		All	URL OCDUK
Wyre Forest	Worcestershire	Leader and cabinet	CON		33	20		3	1		9 (Note: Liberal Party (2))		All	URL OCDUK

== Scotland ==
All 32 Scottish Councils had all their seats up for election by Single Transferable Vote in May 2022. Elections are on a five-year cycle and are next due in May 2027. Only two mainland councils are controlled by majority administrations: West Dumbartonshire and Dundee, which are controlled by Scottish Labour and the Scottish National Party, respectively. The three island councils (Orkney, Shetland and the Western Isles) are each controlled by local independents.

Political control may be held by minority governments (min), coalitions (co), joint leadership arrangements (j.l.) or partnership working arrangements (p.w.).

Last update 16 February 2026

Council	Control		Web	Total	SNP	CON	LAB	LD	SGP	RFM	Other	Vacant	Upcoming by-elections
Aberdeen	NOC	SNP+LD co	URL	45	19	6	11	4		1	4		
Aberdeenshire	NOC	CON+LD+IND co	URL	70	18	20		14		6	12		
Angus	NOC	CON+IND+LAB co	URL	28	11	8	1				8		
Argyll & Bute	NOC	SNP+LD+IND+LAB+GRN co	URL	36	12	8	1	4	1	1	9		
Clackmannanshire	NOC	SNP min	URL	18	8	5	3		1		1		
Dumfries & Galloway	NOC	SNP+LAB+IND+LD co	URL	43	11	10	8	1			13		
Dundee	SNP	SNP maj	URL	29	15	1	8	4			1		
East Ayrshire	NOC	SNP min	URL	32	14	4	8				6 (Note: The Rubbish Party (1))		
East Dunbartonshire	NOC	SNP min	URL	22	8	2	6	5			1		
East Lothian	NOC	LAB min	URL	22	6	4	10		1		1		
East Renfrewshire	NOC	LAB+IND co	URL	18	5	5	5				3		
Edinburgh	NOC	LAB min	URL	63	17	10	11	14	11				
Falkirk	NOC	SNP min	URL	30	11	4	8			1	6		
Fife	NOC	LAB min	URL	75	35	6	18	13		2	1		
Glasgow	NOC	SNP min	URL	85	37	1	31		8	2	6 (Note: Your Party (3))		
Highland	NOC	SNP+IND co	URL	74	19	6	2	16	3		28		
Inverclyde	NOC	LAB min	URL	22	6	2	9				5		
Midlothian	NOC	SNP min	URL	18	8	2	6				2		
Moray	NOC	CON min	URL	26	7	10	3		2		4		
Na h-Eileanan Siar	IND	IND	URL	29	5	1		1			22		
North Ayrshire	NOC	SNP min	URL	33	12	5	11			3	2		
North Lanarkshire	NOC	LAB min	URL	77	24	5	32		1		15 (Note: Progressive Change North Lanarkshire (7) British Unionist Party (1))		
Orkney	IND	IND	URL	21					1		20		
Perth & Kinross	NOC	SNP min	URL	40	16	12	1	5			6		
Renfrewshire	NOC	SNP min	URL	43	20	3	12	1		3	4		
Scottish Borders	NOC	CON+IND co	URL	34	7	15		3	1		8		
Shetland	IND	IND	URL	23	1				1		21		
South Ayrshire	NOC	CON min	URL	28	5	5	5				13 (Note: Alba Party (1))		
South Lanarkshire	NOC	LAB+LD+IND co	URL	64	25	5	25	3	1	2	3		
Stirling	NOC	LAB min	URL	23	10	7	4		1		1		
West Dunbartonshire	NOC	LAB min	URL	22	7		10				5 (Note: West Dunbartonshire Community Party (1))		
West Lothian	NOC	LAB min	URL	33	15	4	11	1		1	1		

== Wales ==
All 22 Welsh unitary authorities had all of their seats up for election in May 2022, and the next elections are in May 2027.

Last update 21 July 2026.

Council	Control		Web	Total	LAB	CON	LD	GRN	RFM	PC	Other	Vacant
Blaenau Gwent	LAB	maj	URL	33	19			1	1		12	
Bridgend	NOC	LAB min	URL	51	25	1				1	24	
Caerphilly	LAB	maj	URL	69	42			1		18	7	1
Cardiff	LAB	maj	URL	79	50	9	10	1	1	2	6 (Note: Propel (1))	
Carmarthenshire	PC	maj	URL	75	15			1	1	38	20	
Ceredigion	PC	maj	URL	38			7			21	10 (Note: Gwlad (1))	
Conwy	NOC	IND+LAB+PC	URL	55	6	8	4	1	2	8	26	
Denbighshire	NOC	LAB+PC	URL	48	14	8		2	1	7	16	
Flintshire	NOC	LAB min	URL	67	27	1	4		8		27 (Note: Flintshire People's Voice (6))	
Gwynedd	PC	maj	URL	69			1			45	23	
Isle of Anglesey	PC	maj	URL	35	3		1		1	18	12	
Merthyr Tydfil	NOC	IND min	URL	30	15				2		15	
Monmouthshire	NOC	LAB min	URL	46	19	19		1			7	
Neath Port Talbot	NOC	IND+PC	URL	60	22		3	1		11	23	
Newport	LAB	maj	URL	51	33	6	1	2			9 (Note: Newport Independents Party (3))	
Pembrokeshire	NOC	IND+LAB+LD	URL	60	9	12	2		1	3	33	
Powys	NOC	LD+LAB	URL	68	9	13	23	1	3	4	15	
Rhondda Cynon Taf	LAB	maj	URL	75	58	1		1		8	6	1
Swansea	LAB	maj	URL	75	44	5	14	1			11 (Note: Uplands Party (2) Independents@Swansea (1))	
Torfaen	LAB	maj	URL	40	28				4		8	
Vale of Glamorgan	NOC	LAB+IND	URL	54	24	13				8	9 (Note: Llantwit First Independents (4))	
Wrexham	NOC	IND+CON	URL	56	14	7			1	7	27 (Note: Trade Unionist and Socialist Coalition (1))	

== Northern Ireland ==
Elections were most recently held for 11 councils in Northern Ireland in May 2023. They are held every four years, with the next elections due in May 2027. All seats are filled at once by Single Transferable vote within district electoral areas of 5 to 7 wards.

The councils have ceremonial mayors elected by council members. Uniquely in the UK, vacancies are filled by co-option by whichever party won the seat at the previous election.

Last update 2 June 2026.

Key to abbreviations below

- NOC = No Overall Control, i.e. no single party has more than half the seats

Unionists:

- DUP = Democratic Unionist Party
- UUP = Ulster Unionist Party
- TUV = Traditional Unionist Voice
- PUP = Progressive Unionist Party

Nationalists:

- SF = Sinn Féin (Irish republicans)
- SDLP = Social Democratic and Labour Party
- Aú = Aontú

Others:

- APNI = Alliance Party of Northern Ireland
- GP = Green Party Northern Ireland
- PBP = People Before Profit
- Ind. = Independent

Control: All councils use a committee system.

Council	Control		Web	Total	SF	DUP	APNI	UUP	SDLP	TUV	GP	PBP	PUP	Aú	Ind.	Vacant
Antrim and Newtownabbey	NOC	DUP largest party	URL	40	9	13	8	6	1						3	
Ards and North Down	NOC	DUP largest party	URL	40		14	12	8	1		2				3	
Armagh City, Banbridge and Craigavon	NOC	SF largest party	URL	41	15	13	4	5	1	1					2	
Belfast	NOC	SF largest party	URL	60	22	14	10	2	4	1	3	1			3	
Causeway Coast and Glens	NOC	DUP largest party	URL	40	12	13	5	3	2	2			1	1	1	
Derry City and Strabane	NOC	SF largest party	URL	40	18	5		3	8			1			5	
Fermanagh and Omagh	SF	SF largest party	URL	40	21	6	2	7	2						2	
Lisburn and Castlereagh	NOC	DUP largest party	URL	40	4	14	13	6	2						1	
Mid and East Antrim	NOC	DUP largest party	URL	40	4	12	7	8		6					3	
Mid-Ulster	NOC	SF largest party	URL	40	19	11		2	5						3	
Newry, Mourne and Down	NOC	SF largest party	URL	41	20	5	4	1	8						3	
Total				462	144	120	65	51	34	10	5	2	1	1	29	
Council	Control		Web	Total	SF	DUP	APNI	UUP	SDLP	TUV	GP	PBP	PUP	Aú	Ind.	Vacant

== See also ==
- List of political parties in the United Kingdom by representation
- History of local government in England
- Local government in the United Kingdom
- Local government in England
- Local government in Scotland
- Local government in Wales
- Local government in Northern Ireland
