= List of Social Democratic Party (UK) MPs =

This is a list of Social Democratic Party MPs. It includes all members of Parliament elected to the British House of Commons representing the Social Democratic Party. Members of the European Parliament are not listed.

Bruce Douglas-Mann, Labour Party MP for Mitcham and Morden, is not included as immediately on his change of allegiance he stood down, forcing a by-election, which he lost.

Member	Constituency	Years served
Rosie Barnes	Greenwich	1987 – 1988 ^{1}
Tom Bradley	Leicester East	1981 – 1983 ^{2}
Christopher Brocklebank-Fowler	North West Norfolk	1981 – 1983 ^{3}
Ronald Brown	Hackney South and Shoreditch	1981 – 1983 ^{2}
John Cartwright	Woolwich East	1981 – 1983 ^{2}
John Cartwright	Woolwich	1983 – 1988 ^{1}
Richard Crawshaw	Liverpool Toxteth	1981 – 1983 ^{2}
George Cunningham	Islington South and Finsbury	1981 – 1983 ^{2}
Ednyfed Hudson Davies	Caerphilly	1981 – 1983 ^{2}
James Dunn	Liverpool Kirkdale	1981 – 1983 ^{2}
Tom Ellis	Wrexham	1981 – 1983 ^{2}
David Ginsburg	Dewsbury	1981 – 1983 ^{2}
John Grant	Islington Central	1981 – 1983 ^{2}
Mike Hancock	Portsmouth South	1984 – 1987 ^{4}
John Horam	Gateshead West	1981 – 1983 ^{2, 5}
Roy Jenkins	Glasgow Hillhead	1982 – 1987 ^{6}
Charles Kennedy	Ross, Cromarty and Skye	1983 – 1988 ^{7}
Edward Lyons	Bradford West	1981 – 1983 ^{2}
Dickson Mabon	Greenock and Port Glasgow	1981 – 1983 ^{2}
Robert Maclennan	Caithness and Sutherland	1981 – 1988 ^{2, 7}
Bryan Magee	Leyton	1982 – 1983 ^{2}
Thomas McNally	Stockport South	1981 – 1983 ^{2}
Bob Mitchell	Southampton Itchen	1981 – 1983 ^{2}
Michael O'Halloran	Islington North	1981 – 1983 ^{2, 8}
Eric Ogden	Liverpool West Derby	1981 – 1983 ^{2}
David Owen	Plymouth Devonport	1981 – 1988 ^{1, 2}
William Rodgers	Stockton-on-Tees	1981 – 1983 ^{2}
John Roper	Farnworth	1981 – 1983 ^{2}
Neville Sandelson	Hayes and Harlington	1981 – 1983 ^{2}
Jeffrey Thomas	Abertillery	1981 – 1983 ^{2}
Mike Thomas	Newcastle upon Tyne East	1981 – 1983 ^{2}
James Wellbeloved	Erith and Crayford	1981 – 1983 ^{2}
Shirley Williams	Crosby	1981 – 1983 ^{6}
Ian Wrigglesworth	Thornaby	1981 – 1983
Ian Wrigglesworth	Stockton South	1983 – 1987 ^{2}

^{1} Joined David Owen's 'Continuing' Social Democratic Party in 1988, then became an Independent Social Democrat MP from 1990 to 1992.
^{2} Sitting Labour Party MP who joined the SDP.
^{3} Sitting Conservative Party MP who joined the SDP.
^{4} Later elected as a Liberal Democrat MP.
^{5} Later elected as a Conservative MP.
^{6} Previously elected as a Labour MP.
^{7} Joined the Liberal Democrats on their formation in 1988.
^{8} Subsequently left the SDP to sit as an independent Labour MP.

== Graphical representation (1981–88) ==
Also includes the continuing SDP from 1988.

Constituency	1981	81	82	83	1983	84	87	1987	88
Plymouth Devonport	Owen								
Woolwich East / Woolwich (1983)	Cartwright								
Caithness and Sutherland	Maclennan								
Thornaby / Stockton South (1983)	Wrigglesworth								
Greenock & Port Glasgow	Mabon								
Stockport South	McNally								
Gateshead West	Horam								
Stockton-on-Tees	Rodgers								
Southampton Itchen	Mitchell								
Farnworth	Roper								
Liverpool Kirkdale	Dunn								
Liverpool Toxteth	Crawshaw								
Liverpool West Derby	Ogden								
Leicester East	Bradley								
Hayes and Harlington	Sandelson								
Hackney S & Shoreditch	Brown								
Islington Central	Grant								
Erith and Crayford	Wellbeloved								
North West Norfolk	Brocklebank-Fowler								
Newcastle upon Tyne East	M. Thomas								
Bradford W	Lyons								
Dewsbury	Ginsburg								
Wrexham	Ellis								
Abertillery	J. Thomas								
Caerphilly	Davies								
Islington North	O'Halloran								
Crosby		Williams							
Islington S & Finsbury			Cunningham						
Leyton			Magee						
Glasgow Hillhead			Jenkins						
Ross, Cromarty and Skye					Kennedy				
Portsmouth South						Hancock			
Greenwich							Barnes		
Constituency	1981	81	82	83	1983	84	87	1987	88
No. of SDP MPs	26	27	30	29	6	7	8	5	3

== See also ==
- Social Democratic Party election results
