= David Rowlands (politician) =

Welsh politician

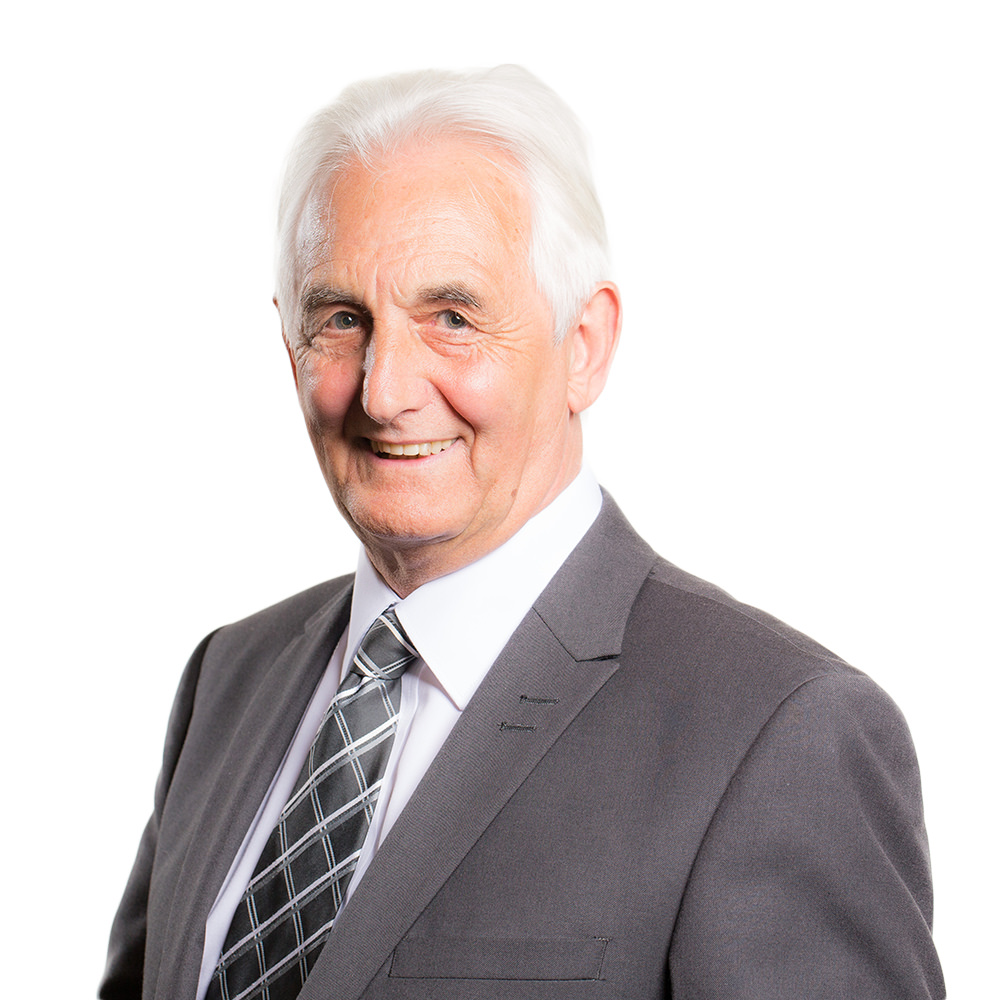

Member of the Senedd for South Wales East
- In office 5 May 2016 – 29 April 2021
- Preceded by: Lindsay Whittle
- Succeeded by: Peredur Owen Griffiths

Personal details
- Born: April 1948 (age 78) Argoed, Caerphilly, Wales
- Party: Reform UK (2019–present)
- Other political affiliations: Independent Alliance for Reform (2020–2021); UKIP (1998–2019)

David John Rowlands (born April 1948) is a Welsh politician who was a Member of the Senedd (MS) for South Wales East from 2016 to 2021. Elected as an MS for the UK Independence Party (UKIP), Rowlands joined the Brexit Party in 2019. He later joined the Independent Alliance for Reform group in the Senedd in October 2020.

== Biography ==
Born in the Welsh mining town of Argoed, he was educated at Pontllanfraith Grammar School obtaining A Levels in economics and geography before studying for a degree in business studies. Rowlands joined UKIP in 1998.

== Political career ==
In the 1997 general election, Rowlands stood as the UKIP candidate for Shrewsbury, coming sixth place with 477 votes. In the 2001 general election, Rowlands stood again as UKIP candidate, for Monmouth.

He contested New Inn ward in Torfaen in the 2004 Welsh local election, where he won 811 votes.

In the 2015 UK General election, Rowlands stood as the UKIP candidate for Merthyr Tydfil and Rhymney. He came second to Labour's Gerald Jones, with 18.7%, retaining his deposit.

Rowlands re-contested Merthyr Tydfil and Rhymney at the 2017 general election, finishing fourth, and taking 1,484 votes (4.4%).

=== Senedd career ===
At the 2016 National Assembly for Wales election, Rowlands finished second in Merthyr Tydfil and Rhymney, receiving 4,277 votes (21%). He was first on UKIP's list in the South Wales east region, and was appointed as an additional member.

==== Resignation from UKIP ====
In May 2019, he resigned from UKIP to join the newly-formed Brexit Party. In the same month as his defection, Rowlands caused controversy by calling far-right activist Tommy Robinson a "courageous character". The Brexit Party distanced themselves from the remarks, saying that Rowlands' views did not "in any way" reflect the party's position.

In mid October 2020, he formed a new group in the Senedd, the Independent Alliance for Reform, together with fellow MSs Mandy Jones and Caroline Jones.

At the 2021 Senedd election, Rowlands sought re-election as a Reform UK candidate, taking just 328 votes (1.4%) in Newport East. He was also the third-placed Reform UK candidate on the regional list, though neither he nor his party were successful. Similarly, UKIP failed to return any of their candidates, with most of Rowlands’ Senedd colleagues having stood unsuccessfully for other parties.

At the 2026 Senedd election, Rowlands was the fourth-placed candidate on the Reform list for the newly-created Sir Fynwy Torfaen constituency.

=== Electoral history ===
Westminster Parliament elections

Date of election	Constituency	Party	Votes	% of votes	Result
2017 election	Merthyr Tydfil and Rhymney	UKIP	1,484	4.4	Not elected
2015 election	Merthyr Tydfil and Rhymney	UKIP	6,106	18.7	Not elected
2010 election	Newport East	UKIP	677	2.0	Not elected
2001 election	Monmouth	UKIP	786	2.7	Not elected

European Parliament elections

Date of election	Constituency	Party	Votes	% of votes	Result
European Election 2014	Wales (4th on list)	UKIP	201,983	27.55	Not elected
European Election 2009	Wales (4th on list)	UKIP	87,585	12.8	Not elected
European Election 2004	Wales (1st on list)	UKIP	96,677	10.5	Not elected

Welsh Assembly elections (Constituency Seats)

Date of election	Constituency	Party	Votes	% of votes	Result
2026 Senedd election	Sir Fynwy Torfaen (4th on list)	Reform	24,155	31.1	Not elected
2021 Senedd election	Newport East	Reform	328	1.4	Not elected
Assembly election 2016	Merthyr Tydfil and Rhymney	UKIP	4,277	20.7	Not elected
Assembly election 2003	Torfaen	UKIP	1,377	7.0	Not elected

Welsh Assembly elections (Regional Seats)

Date of election	Constituency	Party	Votes	% of votes	Result
2021 Senedd election	South Wales East (3rd on list)	Reform	2,756	1.3	Not elected
Assembly election 2016	South Wales East (1st on list)	UKIP	34,524	17.8	Elected
Assembly election 2011	South Wales East (2nd on list)	UKIP	9,526	5.3	Not elected
Assembly election 2007	South Wales East (1st on list)	UKIP	8,725	4.6	Not elected
Assembly election 2003	South Wales East (1st on list)	UKIP	5,949	3.5	Not elected

Senedd
Preceded by Lindsay Whittle	Member of the Senedd for South Wales East; 2016 – 2021	Succeeded by Peredur Owen Griffiths
