= List of Liberal Unionist Party MPs =

This is a list of Liberal Unionist Party MPs. It includes all members of Parliament elected to the British House of Commons representing the Liberal Unionist Party.

== List of MPs ==
Name	Constituency	Start	End
Andrew Agnew	Edinburgh South	1900	1906
Leo Amery	Birmingham South	1911	1912
William Anson	Oxford University	1899	1912
Henry Torrens Anstruther	St Andrews	1886	1903
William Anstruther-Gray	St Andrews	1906; 1910	1910; 1912
H. O. Arnold-Forster	Belfast West; Croydon	1892; 1906	1906; 1909
William Arrol	South Ayrshire	1895	1906
James William Barclay	Forfarshire	1886	1892
Viscount Baring	Biggleswade	1886	1892
Alfred Barnes	Chesterfield	1886	1892
Hamar Alfred Bass	West Staffordshire	1886	1898
Henry Frederick Beaumont	Colne Valley	1886	1892
William Bickford-Smith	Truro	1886	1892
Michael Biddulph	Ross-on-Wye	1886	1900
John Bigham	Liverpool Exchange	1895	1897
Arthur Bignold	Wick Burghs	1900	1906
Thomas Bedford Bolitho	St Ives	1887	1900
John Bright	Birmingham Central	1886	1889
John Albert Bright	Birmingham Central	1889	1895
Alexander Brown	Wellington (Shropshire)	1886	1906
Thomas Buchanan	Edinburgh West	1886	1887
Charles Burn	Torquay	1910	1912
William Sproston Caine	Barrow-in-Furness	1886	1890
James Caldwell	Glasgow St Rollox	1886	1890
Thomas Charles Pleydell Calley	Cricklade	1910	1910
John Campbell	Manchester South	1895	1900
Richard Frederick Fotheringham Campbell	Ayr Burghs	1886	1888
Edward Cavendish	West Derbyshire	1886	1891
Richard Cavendish	North Lonsdale	1895	1906
Spencer Cavendish	Rossendale	1886	1891
Victor Cavendish	West Derbyshire	1891	1908
Austen Chamberlain	East Worcestershire	1892	1912
Joseph Chamberlain	Birmingham West	1886	1912
Richard Chamberlain	Islington West	1886	1892
Percy Clive	Ross-on-Wye	1900; 1908	1906; 1912
James Clyde	Edinburgh West	1909	1912
Thomas Cochrane	North Ayrshire	1892	1910
Douglas Harry Coghill	Newcastle-under-Lyme; Stoke-on-Trent	1886; 1895	1892; 1900
Arthur Colefax	Manchester South West	1910	1910
Jesse Collings	Birmingham Bordesley	1886	1912
Alwyne Compton	Biggleswade	1895	1906
Archibald Corbett	Glasgow Tradeston	1886	1908
John Corbett	Droitwich	1886	1892
Leonard Courtney	Bodmin	1886	1899
Robert Cox	Edinburgh South	1895	1899
Alexander Cross	Glasgow Camlachie	1892	1909
Savile Crossley	Lowestoft; Halifax	1886; 1900	1892; 1906
William Crossman	Portsmouth	1886	1892
Donald Currie	West Perthshire	1886	1900
Leonard Darwin	Lichfield	1892	1895
George Dixon	Birmingham Edgbaston	1886	1898
George Doughty	Grimsby	1898; 1910	1910; 1912
Arthur Elliot	Roxburghshire; Durham	1886; 1898	1892; 1905
Hugh Elliot	North Ayrshire	1886	1892
Bertram Falle	Portsmouth	1910	1912
Horace Farquhar	Marylebone West	1895	1898
Robert Finlay	Inverness Burghs; Edinburgh and St Andrews Universities	1886; 1895; 1910	1892; 1906; 1912
James Fortescue Flannery	Shipley	1895	1906
Hugh Fortescue	Tavistock	1886	1892
Michael Foster	London University	1900	1903
Charles Fraser-Mackintosh	Inverness-shire	1886	1892
Lewis Fry	Bristol North	1886; 1895	1892; 1900
John Lloyd Gibbons	Wolverhampton South	1898	1900
Julian Goldsmid	St Pancras South	1886	1896
John Gordon	South Londonderry	1900	1912
George Goschen	St George's Hanover Square	1886	1893
Thomas Grove	Wilton	1886	1888
William Gull	Barnstaple	1895	1900
Robert Gurdon	Mid Norfolk	1886; 1895	1892; 1895
Edward Hain	St Ives	1900	1904
Alfred Seale Haslam	Newcastle-under-Lyme	1900	1906
George Hastings	East Worcestershire	1886	1892
Henry Havelock-Allen	South East Durham	1886; 1895	1892; 1897
Alexander Henderson	West Staffordshire	1898	1906
Edward Heneage	Great Grimsby	1886; 1893	1892; 1895
John Waller Hills	City of Durham	1906	1912
Benjamin Hingley	North Worcestershire	1886	1887
Henry Hobhouse	East Somerset	1886	1906
Alfred Hopkinson	Cricklade	1895	1898
Rowland Hunt	Ludlow	1903	1912
Henry James	Bury	1886	1895
Ernest Jardine	East Somerset	1910	1912
Robert Jardine	Dumfriesshire	1886	1892
John Jenkins	Carmarthen	1895	1903
Herbert Jessel	St Pancras South	1886; 1910	1906; 1912
George Kemp	Heywood	1895	1904
William Kenny	Dublin St Stephen's Green	1895	1898
William Kenrick	Birmingham North	1886	1899
Frederick Lambton	South East Durham	1900	1910
Edwin Lawrence	Truro	1895	1906
Thomas Lea	South Londonderry	1886	1900
William Edward Hartpole Lecky	Dublin University	1895	1903
Frederick Neville Sutherland Leveson-Gower	Sutherland	1900	1906
Harry Levy-Lawson	Mile End	1905, 1910	1906, 1912
George Lloyd	West Staffordshire	1910	1912
John Lubbock	London University	1886	1900
Alfred Lyttelton	Warwick and Leamington; St George's Hanover Square	1895; 1906	1906; 1912
John Lyttelton	Droitwich	1910	1912
Francis William Maclean	Woodstock	1886	1892
Archibald White Maconochie	East Aberdeenshire	1900	1906
Philip Magnus	London University	1906	1912
Richard Martin	Droitwich	1892	1906
Nevil Story Maskelyne	Cricklade	1886	1892
William Jardine Herries Maxwell	Dumfriesshire	1892; 1900	1895; 1906
Charles McArthur	Liverpool Exchange	1897	1906
Lewis McIver	Edinburgh West	1895	1909
Ernest Meysey-Thompson	Birmingham Handsworth	1906	1912
Henry Meysey-Thompson	Birmingham Handsworth	1892	1906
John Middlemore	Birmingham North	1899	1912
Francis Bingham Mildmay	Totnes	1886	1912
Lewis Molesworth	Bodmin	1900	1906
Charles James Monk	Gloucester	1895	1900
Robert Jasper More	Ludlow	1886	1903
Walter Morrison	Skipton	1886; 1895	1892; 1900
Ernest Morrison-Bell	Ashburton	1908	1910
William Palmer	Petersfield; Edinburgh West	1886; 1892	1892; 1895
Ebenezer Parkes	Birmingham Central	1895	1912
Arthur Pease	Darlington	1895	1898
Herbert Pease	Darlington	1898	
Arthur Peel	Warwick and Leamington	1886	1895
William Peel	Manchester South	1900	1906
John Pender	Wick Burghs	1892	1896
Henry Petty-Fitzmaurice	West Derbyshire	1908	1912
George Pitt-Lewis	Barnstaple	1886	1892
Reginald Pole-Carew	Bodmin	1910	1912
Harry Frederick Pollock	Spalding	1895	1900
Joseph Powell Williams	Birmingham South	1886	1904
Robert Purvis	Peterborough	1895	1906
Cuthbert Quilter	Sudbury	1910	1912
William Quilter	Sudbury	1886	1906
Robert Ratcliff	Burton	1900	1912
William Henry Rattigan	North East Lanarkshire	1901	1904
Edward James Reed	Cardiff	1904	1906
Thomas Richardson	The Hartlepools	1886	1890
Thomas Richardson	The Hartlepools	1895	1900
Ferdinand James von Rothschild	Aylesbury	1886	1899
Lionel Nathan de Rothschild	Aylesbury	1910	1912
Walter Rothschild	Aylesbury	1899	1910
Thomas Russell	Tyrone South	1886	1904
Peter Rylands	Burnley	1886	1887
John St Aubyn	St Ives	1886	1887
Charles Seely	Nottingham West	1892	1895
Charles Hilton Seely	Lincoln	1895	1906
Alexander Craig Sellar	Partick	1886	1890
John Simeon	Southampton	1895	1906
William Pirrie Sinclair	Falkirk Burghs	1886	1892
Hugh Crawford Smith	Tyneside	1900	1906
James Parker Smith	Partick	1890	1906
John Spear	Tavistock	1900; 1910	1906; 1912
Henry Morton Stanley	Lambeth North	1895	1900
Arthur Strauss	Camborne	1895	1900
John Stroyan	West Perthshire	1900	1906
Thomas Sutherland	Greenock	1886; 1892	1892; 1900
Francis Taylor	South Norfolk	1886	1898
Walter Thorburn	Peebles and Selkirk	1886	1906
John Batty Tuke	Edinburgh and St Andrews Universities	1900	1910
Robert Verdin	Northwich	1886	1887
Greville Richard Vernon	South Ayrshire	1886	1892
Charles Pelham Villiers	Wolverhampton South	1886	1898
Henry Vivian	Swansea District	1886	1887
Newton Wallop	South Molton	1886	1891
James Leslie Wanklyn	Bradford Central	1895	1906
Cathcart Wason	Orkney and Shetland	1900	1902
Edward William Watkin	Hythe	1886	1895
William Wentworth-Fitzwilliam	Wakefield	1895	1902
Henry Wentworth-FitzWilliam	Doncaster	1888	1892
John Wentworth-FitzWilliam	Peterborough	1886	1889
William Cornwallis West	West Denbighshire	1886	1892
Henry Wiggin	Birmingham Handsworth	1886	1892
John Charles Williams	Truro	1892	1895
Frederick Wills	Bristol North	1900	1906
John Wilson	Falkirk Burghs	1895	1903
John Wilson	Glasgow St Rollox	1900	1906
John William Wilson	North Worcestershire	1895	1903
Arthur Winterbotham	Cirencester	1886	1887
Edmond Wodehouse	Bath	1886	1906
