= Caroline Jones (politician) =

Welsh politician (1955–2026)

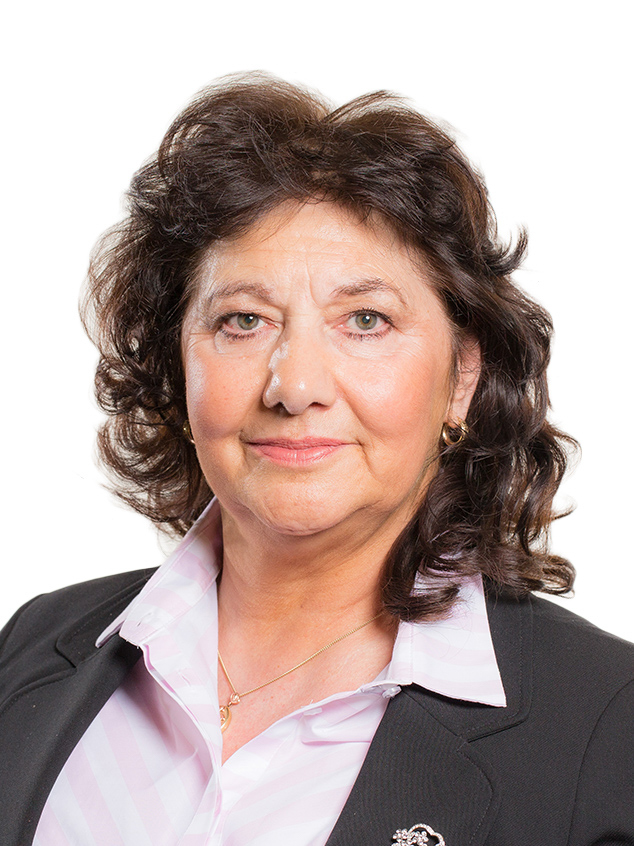
- Jones, c. 2016

Leader of the Independent Alliance for Reform Group in the Senedd
- In office October 2020 – 7 May 2021
- Preceded by: Office created
- Succeeded by: Office abolished

Leader of the UK Independence Party in the Senedd
- In office 17 May 2018 – 10 August 2018
- Leader: Neil Hamilton
- Preceded by: Neil Hamilton
- Succeeded by: Gareth Bennett

Member of the Senedd for South Wales West Region
- In office 5 May 2016 – 29 April 2021
- Preceded by: Peter Black
- Succeeded by: Luke Fletcher

Personal details
- Born: Caroline Yvonne Jones; 1 April 1955 Llwynypia, Wales
- Died: 14 May 2026 (aged 71) Morriston, Wales
- Party: Independent (2018–2019, 2026)
- Other political affiliations: Independent Alliance for Reform (2020–2021); UKIP (2013–2018); Conservative (until 2013); Reform UK (2019–2020, 2023–2026)
- Education: Glamorgan College of Education

Caroline Yvonne Jones (1 April 1955 – 14 May 2026) was a Welsh politician who was a Member of the Senedd (MS) for South Wales West from 2016 to 2021.

Jones was first elected for the UK Independence Party (UKIP) as a member in the Welsh Assembly (now Senedd) from in 2016. In 2018, she shortly served as the UKIP assembly group's leader, before leaving the group to sit as an independent, criticising a move to a 'far-right' stance.

In May 2019, Jones joined the newly formed Brexit Party (now Reform UK) group in the assembly. She later left the group, becoming independent again, due to disagreements with their anti-devolution stance. She later formed the Independent Alliance for Reform assembly group in October 2020, serving as the group's leader, until the 2021 election, when she lost her seat.

She rejoined Reform UK two years later, and assisted with establishing local infrastructure for the party in Wales. She announced her resignation from Reform UK on 7 April 2026, citing concerns around parachute candidates, then stood as an independent candidate in the Pen-y-bont Bro Morgannwg constituency at the 2026 Senedd election, but was not elected. Shortly after, she entered palliative care, following a diagnosis of sepsis, and died on 14 May.

== Background ==
Jones was born in Llwynypia in Rhondda Cynon Taf, Wales, on 1 April 1955. She was educated at Y Pant School and Glamorgan College of Education.

In 2004, while working as a prison officer at HM Prison Parc, Jones opened a sexual discrimination case against the prison. It was alleged that a colleague had spread rumours that she had previously worked as a lap dancer and that intimidation was used in an attempt to force her out. Jones lost the case.

In 2012, Jones was running a cafe.

In May 2026, shortly after the 2026 Senedd election, Jones was admitted to Morriston Hospital and entered palliative care, following a diagnosis of a severe case of sepsis. She died two days later, on 14 May, aged 71.

== Political career ==
=== Conservatives ===
Jones first stood for the Conservative Party in Aberavon at the 2010 UK general election, where she finished third with 4,411 votes (14.2%). In 2012, Jones stood as a Conservative for South Wales Police and Crime Commissioner. Her café in Porthcawl was vandalised during the campaign and Jones pledged to donate 10% of her PCC salary to organisations dealing with victims of crime and crime prevention if elected. The perpetrators of the crime were never caught and it emerged that the CCTV camera protecting the shop was pointed the other way.

=== UKIP ===
Jones defected from the Conservatives to UKIP in 2013.

At the 2014 European Parliament election, Jones was the third-placed candidate on the UKIP list for Wales.

In the 2015 general election, she stood as UKIP's candidate for Bridgend, where she came third with 5,911 votes (15%).

=== Member of the Senedd ===
Jones ran in Bridgend at the 2016 Welsh Assembly election, coming third with 3,919 votes (14.6%). As the lead UKIP candidate on the South Wales West list, she was elected as her party's sole representative in that region.

Jones voted for Neil Hamilton to be the leader of UKIP in the Welsh Assembly.

After Nigel Farage declared his intention to stand down, Jones wrote a letter along with other members of the assembly urging Paul Nuttall to stand in the September 2016 UK Independence Party leadership election.

Jones sat as a member of the Assembly's Health, Social Care and Sport committee.

==== UKIP National Assembly Group Leader ====
Jones replaced Hamilton as leader of UKIP in the National Assembly on the 17 May 2018 following a vote by the UKIP group. On 10 August 2018, Jones lost the group leadership finishing last in the 2018 UKIP Wales leadership election in a three-way contest. Gareth Bennett won the contest and replaced her as group leader.

In May 2018 it was revealed that Jones had failed to declare the employment of husband Alun Williams in her office on her register of interests. Jones described it as "an oversight" that would be corrected. The following month, Jones was taken to court by former UKIP Chief of Staff Robin Hunter-Clarke for the wrongful termination of his contract. The judge ruled that she could not grant interim relief because it was unclear who Mr Hunter-Clarke's employer was at the time of the sacking. Court proceedings were set to recommence in August 2018.

On 12 September 2018, Jones announced that she was leaving the United Kingdom Independence Party citing her reasons as the party moving "to a more far-right position" under Gerard Batten and a leadership election that was "shambolic from beginning to end". She also said that she was a victim of misogyny claiming that she was once told to "shut up" at a meeting. UKIP Group Leader Gareth Bennett admitted that she was told this by a participant, but that "it had nothing to do with her gender". UKIP Wales Leader Neil Hamilton called on Jones to resign her regional list seat and allow another UKIP member to become an AM, which she refused to do. Party Leader Gerard Batten described her statement as "politically correct twaddle to disguise the fact that Mrs Jones is politically ineffective..."

==== Brexit Party ====
On 15 May 2019, Jones along with three other Assembly Members joined the Brexit Party.

On 18 August 2020, Jones released a statement stating that she had quit the Brexit Party's Senedd Group to sit as an independent member due to its newly adopted anti-devolution stance. On 4 September she announced that she would stand in the 2021 Senedd election as an independent candidate for the Bridgend constituency.

==== Independent ====
In mid October 2020 she formed a new group in the Senedd, the Independent Alliance for Reform, together with fellow MSs David Rowlands and Mandy Jones.

At the 2021 Senedd election, Jones came fifth in Bridgend, polling 1,064 votes (3.6%). She received 2,747 (1.5%) list votes in South Wales West, placing her behind UKIP, who were also unsuccessful.

=== Subsequent activity ===
In 2023, Jones joined Reform UK, and was later announced as the party's candidate in Bridgend, ahead of the 2024 general election. She came in second place to Chris Elmore, beating the incumbent Conservatives into third place.

She was expected to be a Reform candidate for the Pen-y-bont Bro Morgannwg Senedd constituency at the 2026 Senedd election. But according to reports in Nation.Cymru Jones was only offered a third place in the Pontypridd Cynon Merthyr constituency which she turned down. On 7 April 2026, Jones announced that she had left Reform UK due to parachute candidates being put on Reform constituencies lists before local members and 'allegations relating to racism and discrimination'. She chose to run as an independent in Pen-y-bont Bro Morgannwg, finishing seventh with 651 votes (0.8%).

Senedd
Preceded by Peter Black	Member of the Senedd for South Wales West; 2016–2021	Succeeded by Tom Giffard
