= Mandy Jones (politician) =

Welsh politician

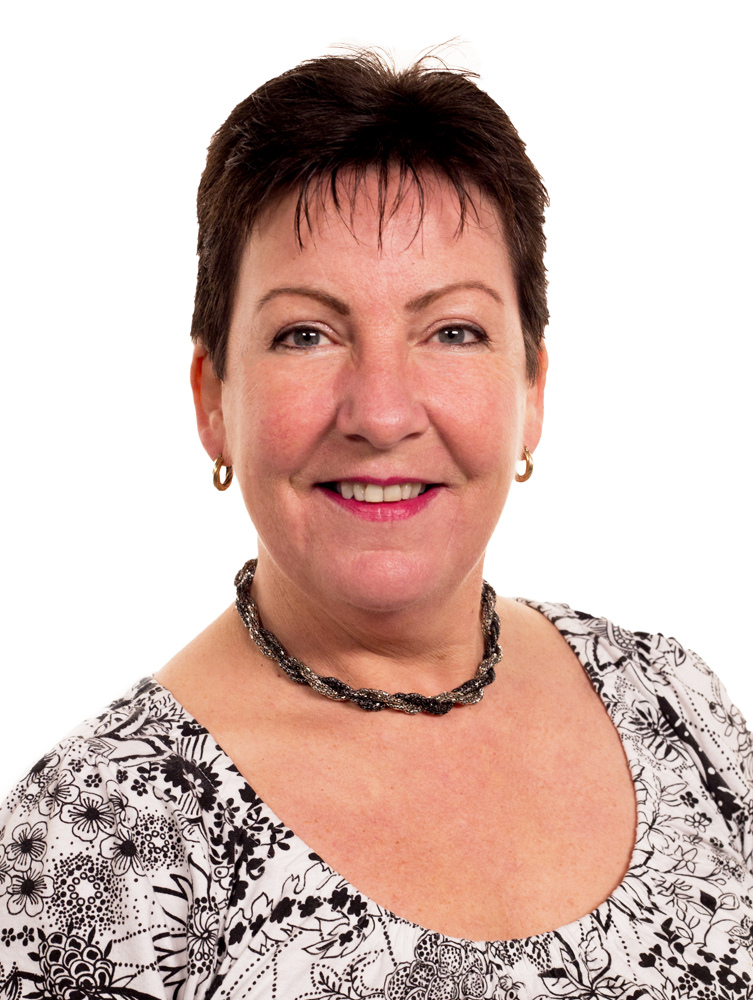

Member of the Senedd for North Wales Region
- In office 27 December 2017 – 29 April 2021
- Preceded by: Nathan Gill
- Succeeded by: Sam Rowlands

Personal details
- Born: Wolverhampton, England
- Party: Reform UK (2019–present)
- Other political affiliations: Independent Alliance for Reform (2020 - 2021); Independent (2017–2019); UKIP (Pre 2017)
- Education: Llysfasi College
- Occupation: Politician
- Profession: Farmer

Mandy Jane Jones is a British former politician and farmer who was a Member of the Senedd (MS) for North Wales from 2017 to 2021. Jones was elected for the UK Independence Party (UKIP) but sat as an independent politician within the Senedd from early January 2018 until May 2019, when she joined the Brexit Party (Reform UK). In October 2020 she joined the Independent Alliance for Reform group.

== Background ==
Jones was born in Wolverhampton, West Midlands and worked as a farm contractor and shepherd in north east Wales. She studied Agriculture & Small Animal Care at Llysfasi College (now Coleg Cambria). She brought up her family in the Corwen area.

== Political career ==
Jones stood for UKIP in the Clwyd South constituency at the 2015 General Election. She also stood for UKIP in Clwyd South at the 2016 Welsh Assembly election, coming fourth behind Labour, the Conservatives and Plaid Cymru. As the third UKIP candidate on the North Wales regional party list, she failed to secure a National Assembly for Wales seat.

=== Member of the Senedd ===
Following the resignation in December 2017 of former UKIP Assembly Member (AM), Nathan Gill, Jones (as the next available UKIP candidate on the regional list) was confirmed on 27 December as the replacement AM. She was due to actively take up her duties following an oath swearing ceremony, which took place on 29 December at the Welsh Assembly's Colwyn Bay buildings.

On 9 January 2018, UKIP Wales announced that she would not be joining the UKIP group in the Assembly, due to employing members of other parties in her office. Jones refused to change her staff and described the UKIP group as "toxic". She describes herself as a Faragist and claims former UKIP leader Nigel Farage supports her actions. Her party membership was suspended on 18 June 2018 following criticism of Neil Hamilton's nomination as an assembly commissioner.

In March 2019, Jones spoke in the Assembly Chamber about the physical and emotional abuse she suffered from her adopted mother, in opposition to the Welsh Government's proposals to ban the smacking of children.

In May 2019, Jones along with three other Assembly Members joined the Brexit Party and formed an assembly group in the Senedd, led by Mark Reckless.

In mid October 2020 she formed a new group in the Senedd, the Independent Alliance for Reform, together with fellow MSs David Rowlands and Caroline Jones.

In March 2021, Jones was selected by Reform UK as their candidate for Clwyd South, ahead of the May Senedd election. She was not among the Reform candidates seeking election on the North Wales list. In total, Jones received just 277 votes (1.1%), coming last out of all candidates.

== Electoral history ==
=== 2015 general election ===
General election 2015: Clwyd South
| Party | Candidate | Votes | % | ±% |
|---|---|---|---|---|
| Labour | Susan Elan Jones | 13,051 | 37.2 | −1.2 |
| Conservative | David Nicholls | 10,649 | 30.4 | +0.2 |
| UKIP | Mandy Jones | 5,480 | 15.6 | +13.3 |
| Plaid Cymru | Mabon ap Gwynfor | 3,620 | 10.3 | +1.6 |
| Liberal Democrats | Bruce Roberts | 1,349 | 3.8 | −13.4 |
| Green | Duncan Rees | 915 | 2.6 | N/A |
| Rejected ballots | | 55 | | |
| Majority | | 2,402 | 6.9 | −1.3 |
| Turnout | | 35,064 | 63.8 | −0.7 |
| Registered electors | | 54,996 | | |
| Labour hold | | Swing | -0.7 | |

=== 2016 Assembly election ===
==== Constituency ====
2016 National Assembly for Wales election: Clwyd South
| Party | Candidate | Votes | % | ±% |
|---|---|---|---|---|
| Labour | Ken Skates | 7,862 | 35.5 | −6.9 |
| Conservative | Simon Baynes | 4,846 | 21.9 | −7.3 |
| Plaid Cymru | Mabon ap Gwynfor | 3,861 | 17.4 | −1.1 |
| UKIP | Mandy Jones | 2,827 | 12.8 | +12.8 |
| Liberal Democrats | Aled Roberts | 2,289 | 10.3 | +0.5 |
| Green | Duncan Rees | 474 | 2.1 | +2.1 |
| Majority | | 3,016 | 13.6 | +0.3 |
| Turnout | | 22,159 | 40.9 | +4.0 |
| Labour hold | | Swing | +0.2 | |

==== Regional list ====
Jones was placed third on the North Wales regional list for the UK Independence Party, behind Nathan Gill and Michelle Brown.

Senedd
| Preceded by Nathan Gill | Member of the Senedd for North Wales; Dec 2017 – 2021 | Succeeded by Sam Rowlands |
