= List of Social Democratic and Labour Party MPs =

This is a list of Social Democratic and Labour Party MPs. It includes all members of Parliament elected to the British House of Commons representing the Social Democratic and Labour Party. Members of the European Parliament are not listed.

Member	Constituency	Years served
Gerry Fitt	Belfast West	1970–1980 (Note: Elected for the Republican Labour Party in 1966 and 1970; formed the SDLP shortly after the latter general election; became an Independent Socialist MP in 1980.)
John Hume	Foyle	1983–2005
Seamus Mallon	Newry and Armagh	1986–2005
Eddie McGrady	South Down	1987–2010
Joe Hendron	Belfast West	1992–1997
Mark Durkan	Foyle	2005–2017
Alasdair McDonnell	Belfast South	2005–2017
Margaret Ritchie	South Down	2010–2017
Colum Eastwood	Foyle	2019–present
Claire Hanna	Belfast South and Mid Down (Note: Constituency was called "Belfast South" until 2024.)	2019–present

== Graphical representation ==
Constituency	1970	2/'74	10/'74	1979	1980	1983	1986	1987	1992	1997	2005	2010	2015	2017	2019	2024
Belfast South and Mid Down											McDonnell				Hanna	
Belfast West	Fitt								Hendron							
Foyle						Hume					Durkan				Eastwood	
Newry and Armagh							Mallon									
South Down								McGrady				Ritchie				
No. of SDLP MPs	1	1	1	1	0	1	2	3	4	3	3	3	3	0	2	2
