= Independent Alliance for Reform =

Political group in the Welsh Parliament

Independent Alliance for Reform Y Gynghrair Annibynnol dros Ddiwygio
- Abbreviation: IAR
- Leader: Caroline Jones
- Founders: Caroline Jones; David Rowlands; Mandy Jones
- Founded: 16 October 2020
- Dissolved: 7 May 2021
- Split from: Brexit Party
- Ideology: Regionalism; Hard Euroscepticism
- Colours: Magenta; Cyan
- 5th Senedd: 3 / 60

Website
- Facebook page

The Independent Alliance for Reform (Welsh: Y Gynghrair Annibynnol dros Ddiwygio) was a political group in the Senedd. It was founded in October 2020, and had three members. The group was dissolved in 2021 when all three of its Senedd Members lost their seats in that year's election.

== Membership ==
The following Members of the Senedd were part of the group:

- Caroline Jones
- David Rowlands
- Mandy Jones

All were former members of UKIP and then of the Brexit Party. The group's leader was Caroline Jones, who was an independent, whilst David Rowlands and Mandy Jones were still members of Reform UK, formerly known as the Brexit Party.

All three lost their seats at the 2021 Senedd election.
