= Politics of the United Kingdom =

- Polity type: Parliamentary constitutional monarchy
- Formation: 1 January 1801; 225 years ago

Legislative branch
- Name: Parliament
- Type: Bicameral
- Meeting place: Palace of Westminster
- Upper house
- Name: House of Lords
- Presiding officer: The Lord Forsyth of Drumlean, Lord Speaker
- Appointer: The House of Lords, approved and sworn in by the Sovereign
- Lower house
- Name: House of Commons
- Presiding officer: Sir Lindsay Hoyle, Speaker of the House of Commons
- Appointer: House of Commons, approved and sworn in by the Sovereign

Executive branch
- Head of state
- Title: King or Queen
- Currently: King Charles III
- Appointer: Hereditary
- Head of government
- Title: Prime Minister of the United Kingdom
- Currently: Andy Burnham
- Appointer: The Sovereign (with their choice limited to the person who can command the confidence of the House of Commons)
- Cabinet
- Name: Cabinet of the United Kingdom
- Current cabinet: Burnham ministry
- Leader: Prime Minister
- Appointer: Prime Minister
- Headquarters: Cabinet Office
- Ministries: 22

Judicial branch
- Name: Judiciaries of the United Kingdom
- Supreme Court
- Chief judge: The Lord Reed of Allermuir
- Seat: Middlesex Guildhall

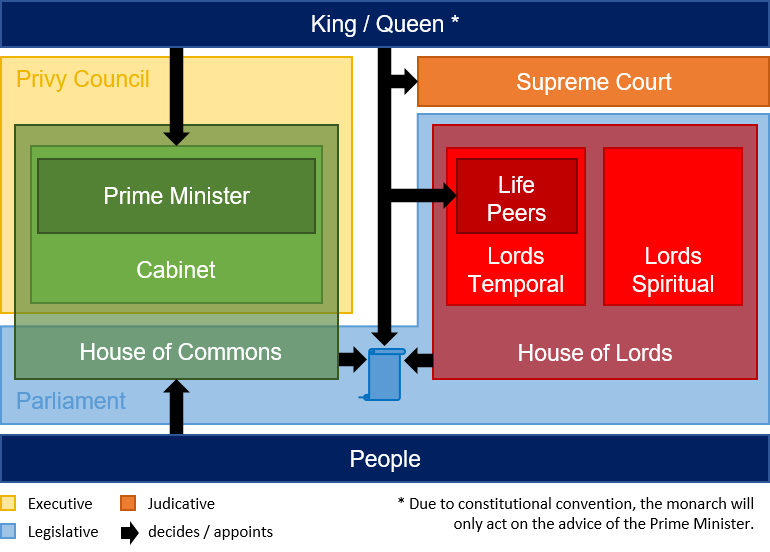
Organisational chart of the political system for UK-wide institutions

The United Kingdom is a constitutional monarchy which, by legislation and convention, operates as a unitary parliamentary democracy. A hereditary monarch, currently King Charles III, serves as head of state while the prime minister of the United Kingdom, currently Andy Burnham, serves as the head of the elected government.

Under the United Kingdom's parliamentary system, executive power is exercised by His Majesty's Government, whose prime minister is formally appointed by the king to act in his name. The king must appoint an existing member of parliament that can command the confidence of the House of Commons, usually the leader of the majority party or apparent majority party, though the king may choose to appoint an alternative if they say that they cannot expect the confidence of the House. Having taken office, the prime minister can then appoint all other ministers from parliament.

The Parliament has two houses: the House of Commons and the House of Lords. The Crown in Parliament is the UK's supreme legislative body, with unlimited powers of legislation subject only to convention. Normally bills passed by both Houses become law when presented for Royal Assent. However, there is provision in the Parliament Acts by which the democratically elected House of Commons could exceptionally obtain Royal Assent to a bill which the House of Lords has repeatedly failed or refused to pass. However, any use of this Parliament Acts procedure could provoke a constitutional crisis.

Parliament has devolved some legislative powers to the parliaments of Scotland and Wales and the assembly of Northern Ireland. Many other limited powers are granted by statute to the Privy Council, H.M.Ministers or other authorities, to make delegated legislation on particular subjects.

The British political system is a Multi-party system and was according to the V-Dem Democracy Indices 2023 the 22nd most electorally democratic in the world. From the 1920s to date, the two dominant parties have been the Conservative Party and the Labour Party. Before the Labour Party rose in British politics, the Liberal Party was the other major political party, along with the Conservatives. While coalition and minority governments have been an occasional feature of parliamentary politics, the first-past-the-post electoral system used for general elections tends to maintain the dominance of these two parties, though each has in the past century relied upon a third party, such as the Liberal Democrats, to deliver a working majority in Parliament. A Conservative–Liberal Democrat coalition government held office from 2010 until 2015, the first coalition since 1945. The coalition ended following parliamentary elections on 7 May 2015, in which the Conservative Party won an outright majority of seats, 330 of the 650 seats in the House of Commons, while their coalition partners lost all but eight seats.

With the partition of Ireland, Northern Ireland received home rule in 1920, though civil unrest meant direct rule was restored in 1972. Support for nationalist parties in Scotland and Wales led to proposals for devolution in the 1970s, though only in the 1990s did devolution happen. Today, Scotland, Wales and Northern Ireland each possess a parliament/assembly and a government, with devolution in Northern Ireland being conditional on participation in certain all-Ireland institutions. The British government remains responsible for non-devolved matters and, in the case of Northern Ireland, co-operates with the government of the Republic of Ireland. Devolution of executive and legislative powers may have contributed to increased support for independence in the constituent parts of the United Kingdom. The principal Scottish pro-independence party, the Scottish National Party, became a minority government in 2007 and then went on to win an overall majority of MSPs at the 2011 Scottish Parliament elections which formed the current Scottish Government administration. In a 2014 referendum on independence 44.7% of voters voted for independence versus 55.3% against. In Northern Ireland, Irish nationalist parties such as Sinn Féin advocate Irish reunification. In Wales, Welsh nationalist parties such as Plaid Cymru support Welsh independence.

The constitution of the United Kingdom is uncodified, being made up of constitutional conventions, statutes and other elements. This system of government, known as the Westminster system, has been adopted by other countries, especially those that were formerly parts of the British Empire. The United Kingdom is also responsible for several other territories, which fall into two categories: the Crown Dependencies, in the immediate vicinity of the UK, are strictly-speaking subject to the British Crown (i.e., the Monarch) but not part of the United Kingdom (though de facto British territory), and British Overseas Territories, as British colonies were re-designated in 1983, which are part of the sovereign territory of the United Kingdom, in which different aspects of internal governance have been delegated to local governments, with each territory having its own first minister, (though the titles differ, such as in the case of the Chief Minister of Gibraltar). They remain subject to the Parliament of the United Kingdom (which refers only to Great Britain and Northern Ireland, governed directly by the British Government, and not via local subsidiary governments or officers.

== History ==
- Treaty of Union agreed by commissioners for each parliament on 22 July 1706.
- Acts of Union 1707, passed by both the Parliament of England and the Parliament of Scotland to form the Kingdom of Great Britain.
- Acts of Union 1800, passed by both the Parliament of Great Britain and the Parliament of Ireland to form the United Kingdom of Great Britain and Ireland.
- Government of Ireland Act 1920, passed by the Parliament of the United Kingdom and created the partition of Ireland. The republican southern part of Ireland became Republic of Ireland (also known as Éire), leaving Northern Ireland part of the union.
- The Accession of the United Kingdom to the European Communities (EC) took effect on 1 January 1974.
- The United Kingdom withdrew from the European Union (EU) on 31 January 2020.

=== Overviews by period ===
- 2010s in United Kingdom political history
- 2020s in United Kingdom political history
- Politics of the United Kingdom in the 19th century
- Premiership of Margaret Thatcher
- Premiership of John Major
- Premiership of Tony Blair
- Premiership of Gordon Brown
- Premiership of David Cameron
- Premiership of Theresa May
- Premiership of Boris Johnson
- Premiership of Liz Truss
- Premiership of Rishi Sunak
- Premiership of Keir Starmer
- Premiership of Andy Burnham

== The Crown ==
The British monarch, currently King Charles III, is the head of state of the United Kingdom. Though he takes little direct part in government, the Crown remains the fount in which ultimate power over the executive government, the judiciary, the legislature and the established Church of England formally lies. These powers are known as the royal prerogative and cover a vast amount of things, such as the issue or withdrawal of passports, the appointment or dismissal of the prime minister or even the declaration of war. The powers are delegated from the Crown primarily to the prime minister, who may freely appoint privy councillors, junior ministers and other officers and servants of the Crown, (civil, military, diplomatic, and others such as the secret services) to exercise them. All powers are subject to the Rule of Law, so that the legality of their exercise may always be judicially reviewed and quashed by the High Court, and their exercise is supervised by Parliament when it is sitting. The exercise of most powers by His Majesty's Government generally does not require the consent of Parliament; but certain statutory powers are subject to positive or negative resolutions of Parliament, notably the powers to make delegated legislation by Statutory Instruments, and to make certain Rules and Orders.

The head of His Majesty's Government, the prime minister, has weekly meetings to consult the sovereign, when they may express their feelings, warn, or advise the prime minister in the government's work.

According to the uncodified constitution of the United Kingdom, the monarch has the following powers:

Domestic powers

- The power to appoint (and theoretically to dismiss) a prime minister
- The powers to appoint members to the Privy Council, to dismiss privy councillors, and to summon only selected privy councillors to meetings of the Cabinet
- The powers to summon, prorogue and dissolve Parliament
- The power to grant (or theoretically to refuse) Royal Assent to parliamentary bills, making them legal Acts of Parliament
- The power to create new peers, to be summoned to parliament as members of the House of Lords
- The powers to commission officers in the Armed Forces, and to command the Armed Forces of the United Kingdom
- The powers to create and grant offices and employments to exercise royal powers, including the senior judiciary, and to dismiss most other officers at the pleasure of the Crown.
- The power to issue and withdraw passports
- The power to exercise the prerogative of mercy to pardon criminal convictions or reduce sentences
- The powers to grant honours, ranks, titles, decorations, medals and patronage
- The power to create corporations by Royal charter

Foreign powers

- The power to make and ratify treaties
- The power to declare war and peace
- The power to deploy the Armed Forces overseas
- The power to recognise states
- The power to accredit and receive diplomats

== Executive ==
Executive power in the United Kingdom is exercised by the Sovereign, King Charles III, via His Majesty's Government and the devolved national authorities – the Scottish Government, the Welsh Government and the Northern Ireland Executive; and by up to three more layers of elected local authorities, often County Councils, District Councils, and Parish Councils. For example, the Corporation of The City of London, which administers only about one square mile of the capital historically enjoys some exceptional local powers, to the exclusion of all other local authorities below Parliament.

=== His Majesty's Government ===
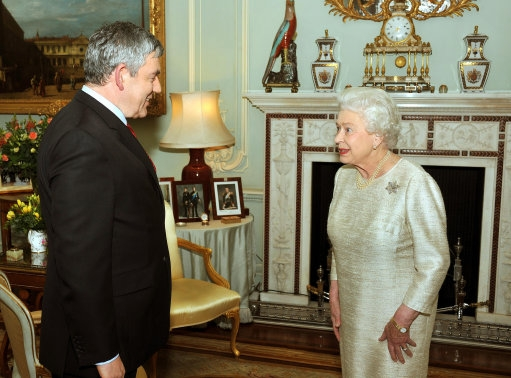
HM Queen Elizabeth II and her prime minister Gordon Brown, the head of Her Majesty's Government (2010)

The monarch appoints a Prime Minister as the head of His Majesty's Government in the United Kingdom, guided by the strict convention that the Prime Minister should be the member of the House of Commons most likely to be able to form a Government with the support of that House. In practice, this means that the leader of any political party with a majority of seats in the House of Commons is chosen to be the prime minister. If no party has an absolute majority, the leader of the largest party is given the first opportunity to form a coalition. The Prime Minister then selects other Ministers who make up the Government and act as political heads of various Government Departments. About twenty of the most senior government ministers make up the Cabinet and approximately 100 ministers in total comprise the government. In accordance with constitutional convention, all ministers within the government are either Members of Parliament or peers in the House of Lords.

As in some other parliamentary systems of government (especially those based upon the Westminster system), the executive (called "the government") is drawn from and is answerable to Parliament – a successful vote of no confidence will force the government either to resign or to seek a parliamentary dissolution and a general election. In practice, members of parliament of all major parties are strictly controlled by whips who try to ensure they vote according to party policy. If the government has a large majority, then they are very unlikely to lose enough votes to be unable to pass legislation.

==== The Prime Minister and the Cabinet ====
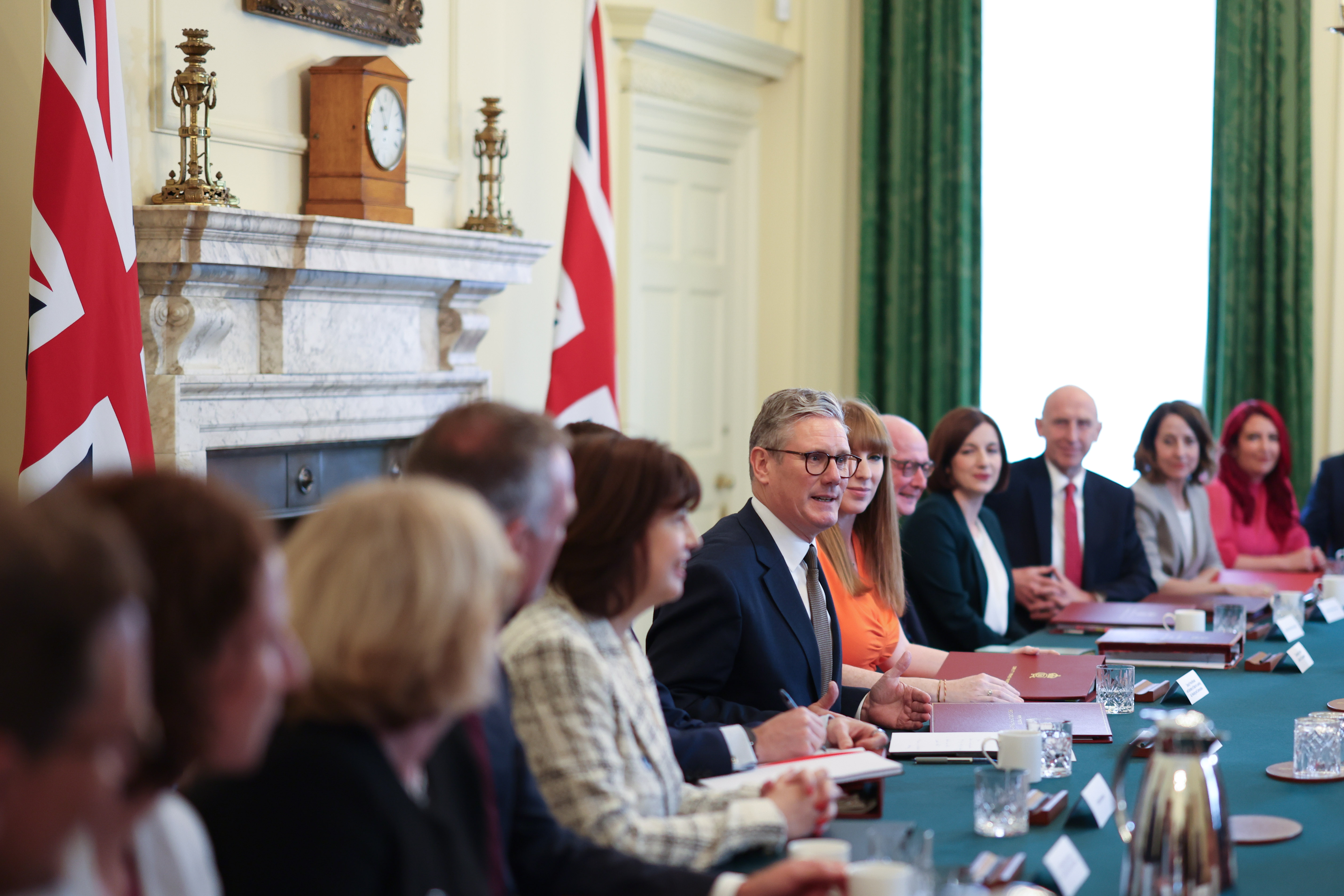
A meeting of the former Starmer ministry

The prime minister, currently Andy Burnham, is the most senior minister in the Cabinet. Their tenure begins when they are appointed by the monarch. The prime minister is responsible for chairing Cabinet meetings, selecting Cabinet ministers (and all other positions in His Majesty's government), and formulating government policy. The prime minister being the de facto leader of the UK, exercises executive functions that are nominally vested in the sovereign (by way of the Royal Prerogatives). Historically, the British monarch was the sole source of executive powers in the government. However, following the lead of the Hanoverian monarchs, an arrangement of a "prime minister" chairing and leading the Cabinet began to emerge. Over time, this arrangement became the effective executive branch of government, as it assumed the day-to-day functioning of the British government away from the sovereign.

Theoretically, the prime minister is primus inter pares (i.e., Latin for "first among equals") among their Cabinet colleagues. While the prime minister is the senior Cabinet minister, they are theoretically bound to make executive decisions in a collective fashion with the other Cabinet ministers. The Cabinet, along with the PM, consists of secretaries of state from the various government departments, the Lord High Chancellor of Great Britain, the Lord Privy Seal, the Lord President of the Council, the president of the Board of Trade, the Chancellor of the Duchy of Lancaster and Ministers without portfolio. Cabinet meetings are typically held weekly, while Parliament is in session.

==== Government departments and the Civil Service ====
The Government of the United Kingdom contains a number of ministries known mainly, though not exclusively as departments, e.g., Department for Education. These are politically led by a Government Minister who is often a Secretary of State and member of the Cabinet. The minister may also be supported by a number of junior ministers. In practice, several government departments and ministers have responsibilities that cover England alone, with devolved bodies having responsibility for Scotland, Wales and Northern Ireland, (for example – the Department of Health), or responsibilities that mainly focus on England (such as the Department for Education).

Implementation of the Minister's decisions is carried out by a permanent politically neutral organisation known as the Civil Service. Its constitutional role is to support the Government of the day regardless of which political party is in power. Unlike some other democracies, senior civil servants remain in post upon a change of Government. Administrative management of the department is led by a head civil servant known in most Departments as a Permanent secretary. The majority of the civil service staff in fact work in executive agencies, which are separate operational organisations reporting to Departments of State.

"Whitehall" is often used as a metonym for the central core of the Civil Service. This is because most Government Departments have headquarters in and around the former Royal Palace Whitehall.

== Heads of governments ==
HM Government of the United Kingdom is the central government of the United Kingdom. Based in London, it is headed by the prime minister. As England does not have its own separate government, it is governed directly by the prime minister and UK Government. The Scottish Government is the devolved government of Scotland and is based in the capital city of Scotland Edinburgh. The Scottish Government is headed by the first minister and is supported by their deputy first minister. The Northern Ireland Executive, based in Belfast, is headed by both the first minister and deputy first minister of Northern Ireland under the terms of the Good Friday Agreement (1998), whilst the first minister of Wales serves as the leader of the Welsh Government, located in the Welsh capital, Cardiff.

=== Current heads of government ===
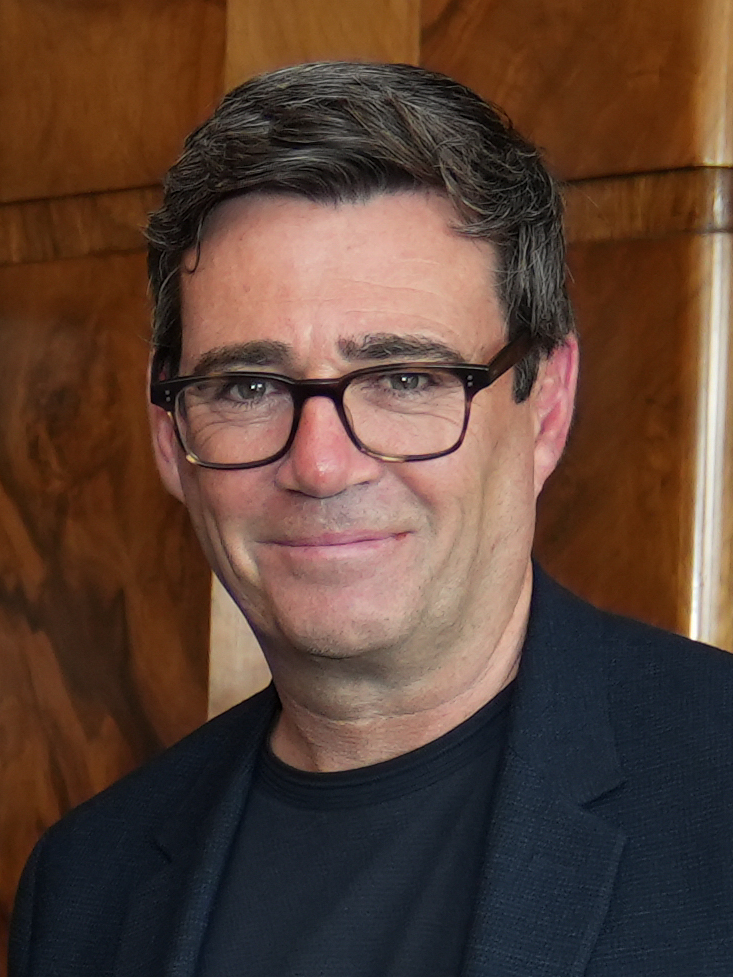
(United Kingdom) United Kingdom
Andy Burnham
Prime Minister

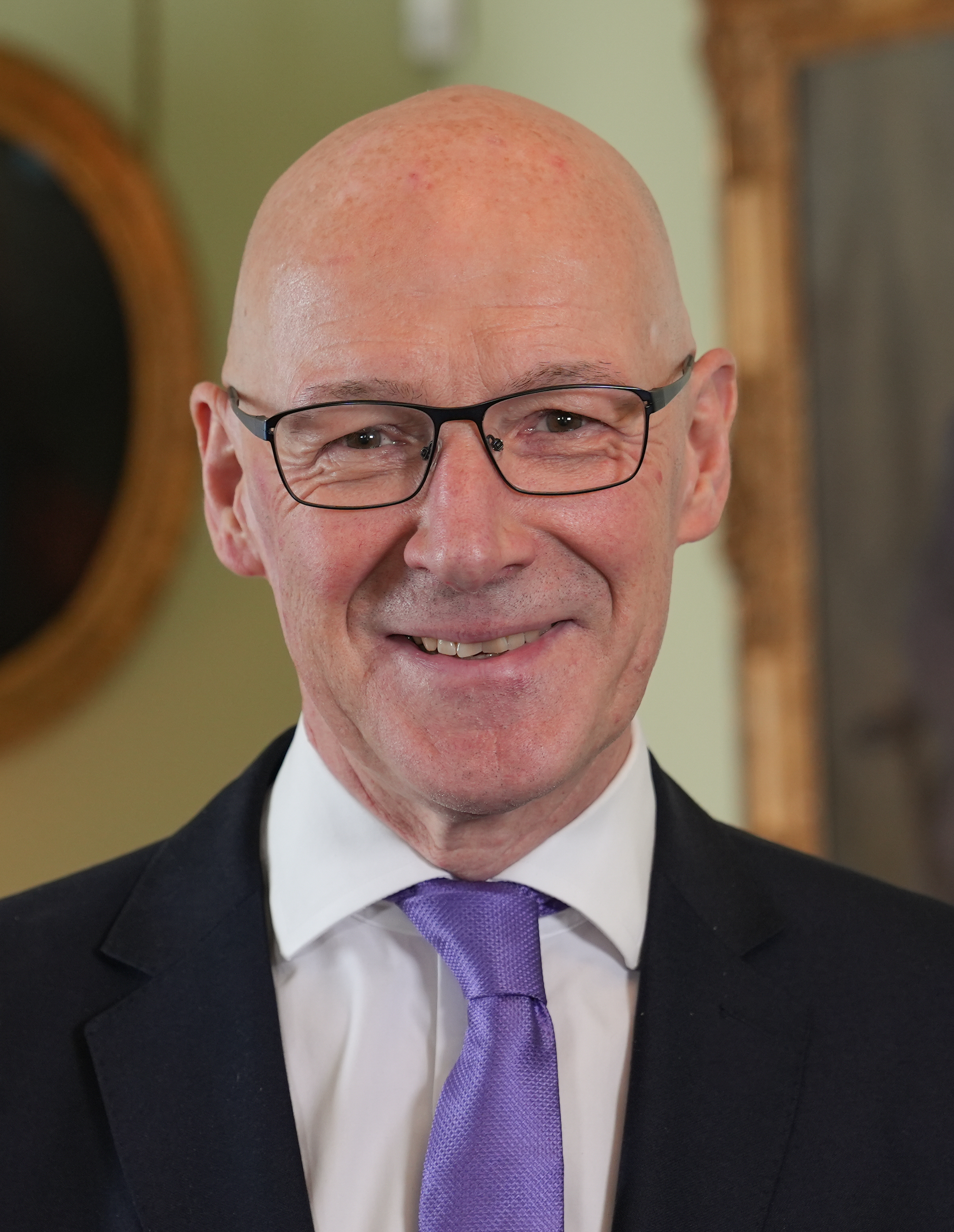
(Scotland) Scotland
John Swinney
First Minister

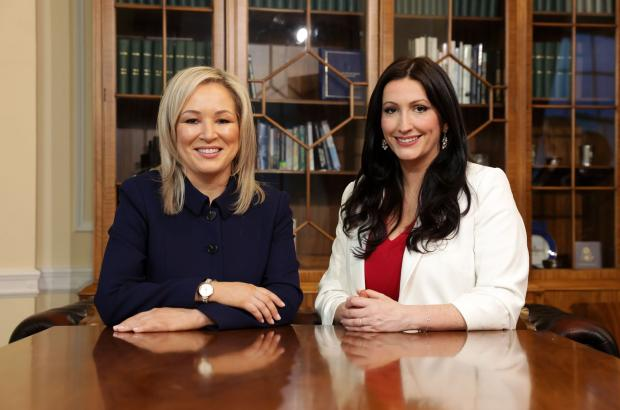
Northern Ireland
Michelle O'Neill and Emma Little-Pengelly
First Minister and Deputy First Minister

(Wales) Wales
Rhun ap Iorwerth
First Minister

== Devolved national governments ==
=== Scottish Government ===
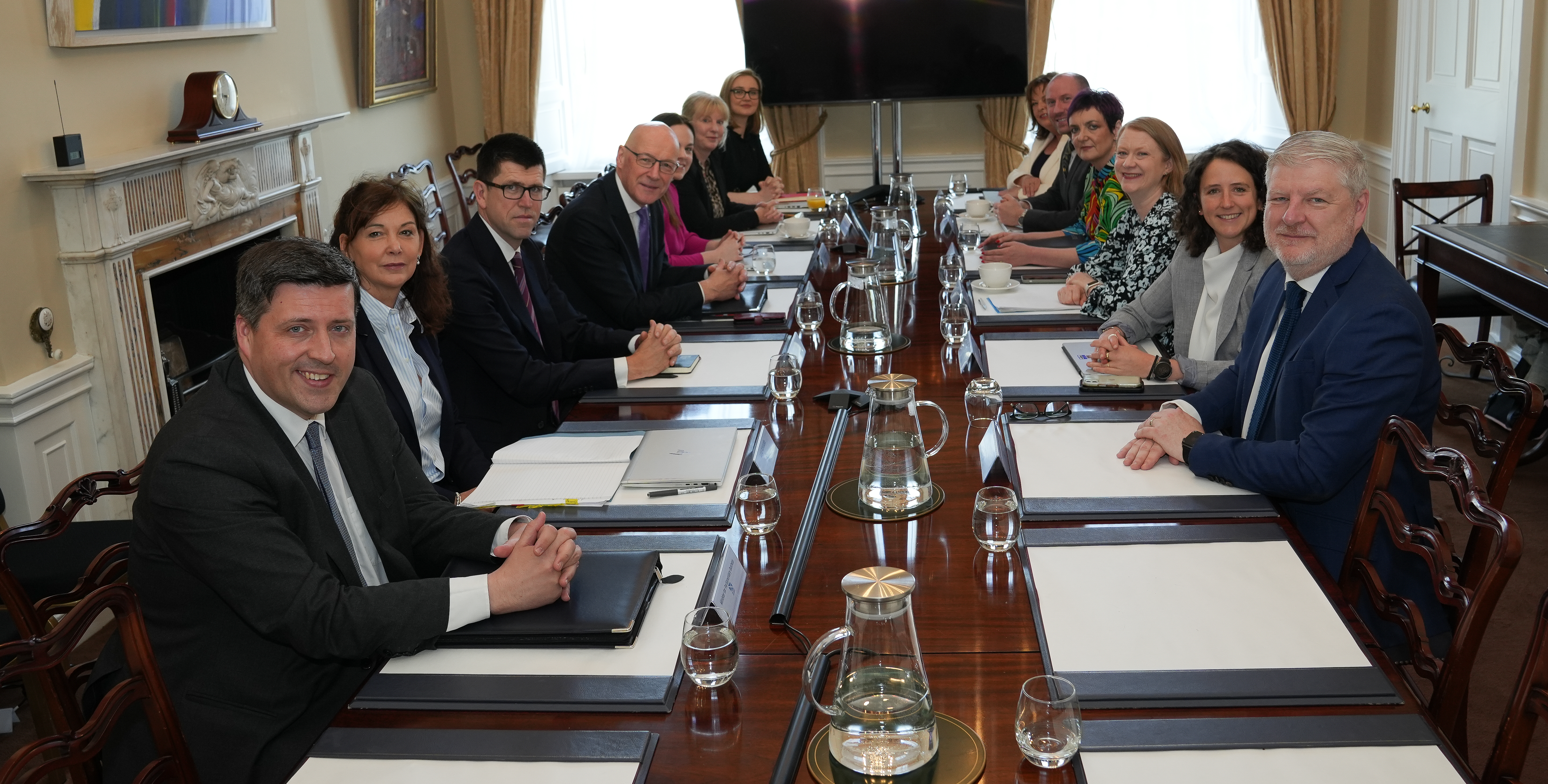
The first Swinney government under the leadership of John Swinney meets for a meeting of the cabinet at Bute House

The Scottish Government is responsible for all issues that are not explicitly reserved to the United Kingdom Parliament at Westminster, by the Scotland Act; including NHS Scotland, education, justice, rural affairs, agriculture, forestry and fisheries, some aspects of the benefits system, elections to the Scottish Parliament and local government, some aspects of the energy network, the environment, the Scottish Fire and Rescue Service, some aspects of equality legislation, housing, planning, sport, culture, tourism, the Crown Estate, onshore oil and gas licensing, some aspects of taxation including Scottish council tax and transport.

In the 2024–25 financial year, its annual budget was almost £60 billion. The government is led by the first minister, assisted by the deputy first minister alongside various Ministers with individual portfolios and remits. The Scottish Parliament nominates a Member to be appointed as First Minister by the King. The first minister then appoints their Ministers (known as Cabinet Secretaries) and junior Ministers, subject to approval by the Parliament. The first minister, the Ministers (but not junior ministers), the Lord Advocate and Solicitor General are the Members of the Scottish Government and attend meetings of the Scottish cabinet, as set out in the Scotland Act 1998. They are collectively known as "the Scottish Ministers".

The Scottish Government has been described as "one of the world's most powerful devolved administrations".

=== Welsh Government ===
The Welsh Government and Senedd have more limited powers than those devolved to Scotland, although following the passing of the Government of Wales Act 2006 and the 2011 Welsh devolution referendum, the Senedd can now legislate in some areas through an Act of Senedd Cymru. The current First Minister of Wales, or Prif Weinidog Cymru in Welsh, is Rhun ap Iorwerth of Plaid Cymru.

=== Northern Ireland Executive ===
Assembly have powers closer to those already devolved to Scotland. The Northern Ireland Executive is led by a diarchy, most recently First Minister Michelle O'Neill (Sinn Féin) and deputy First Minister Emma-Little Pengelly (DUP).

== Legislatures ==
The British Parliament is the supreme legislative body in the United Kingdom (i.e., there is parliamentary sovereignty), and government is drawn from and answerable to it. Parliament is bicameral, consisting of the House of Commons and the House of Lords. There are also devolved Scottish and Welsh parliaments and a devolved assembly in Northern Ireland, with varying degrees of legislative authority.

=== British Parliament ===
==== House of Commons ====
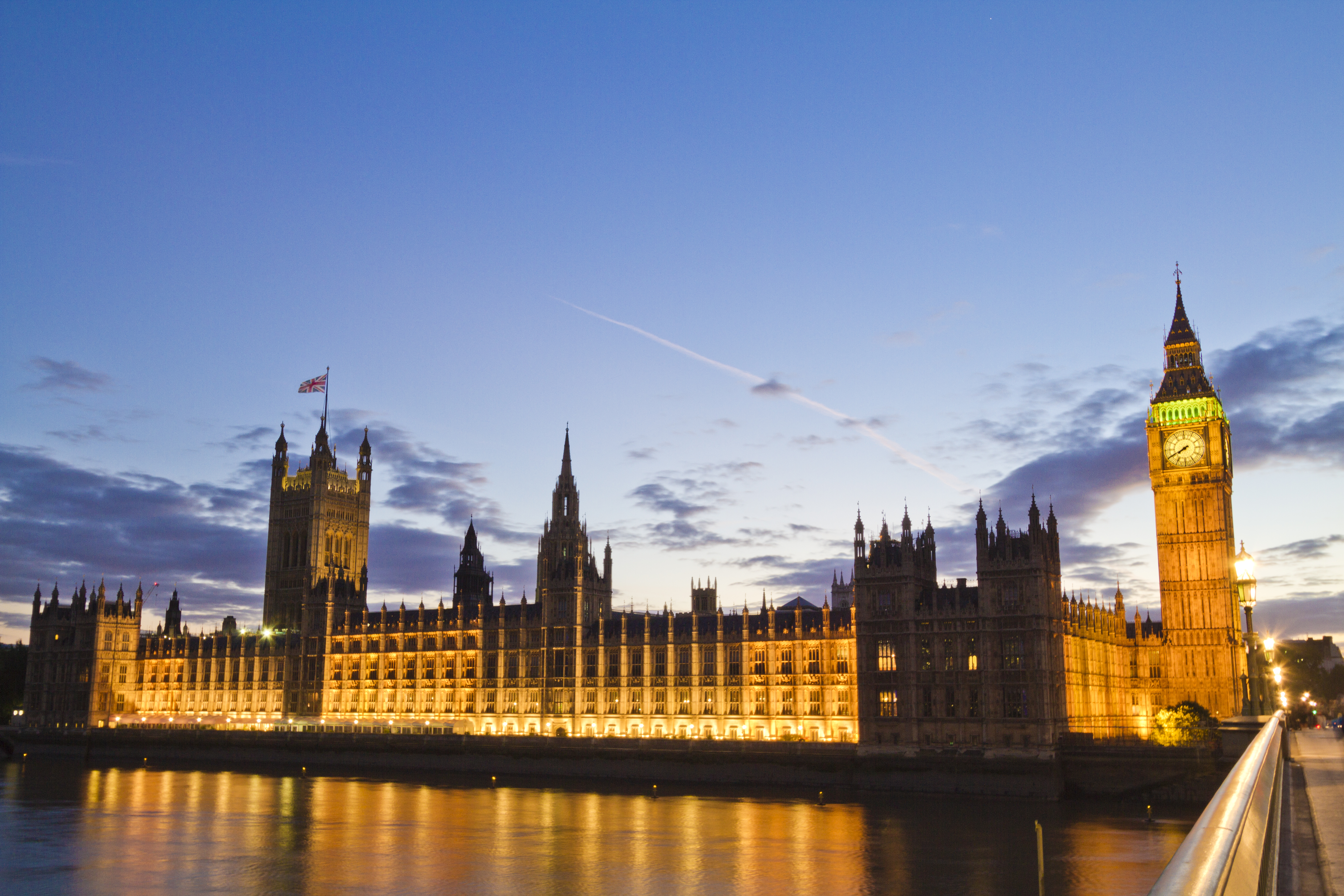
Parliament meets at the Palace of Westminster

The four countries of the United Kingdom are divided into parliamentary constituencies of broadly equal population by the four Boundary Commissions. Each constituency elects a Member of Parliament (MP) to the House of Commons at general elections and, if required, at by-elections. As of the 2010 general election there are 650 constituencies (there were 646 before that year's general election). At the 2017 general election, of the 650 MPs, all but one – Sylvia Hermon – were elected as representatives of a political party. However, as of the 2019 general election, there are currently 11 independent MPs, who have either chosen to leave their political party or have had the whip withdrawn.

In modern times, all prime ministers and leaders of the opposition have been drawn from the Commons, not the Lords. Alec Douglas-Home resigned from his peerages days after becoming prime minister in 1963, and the last prime minister before him from the Lords left in 1902 (the Marquess of Salisbury).

One party usually has a majority in parliament, because of the use of the First Past the Post electoral system, which has been conducive in creating the current Two-party system. The monarch normally asks a person commissioned to form a government simply whether it can survive in the House of Commons, something which majority governments are expected to be able to do. In exceptional circumstances the monarch asks someone to 'form a government' with a parliamentary minority which in the event of no party having a majority requires the formation of a coalition government or 'confidence and supply' arrangement. This option is only ever taken at a time of national emergency, such as war-time. It was given in 1916 to Bonar Law, and when he declined, to David Lloyd George and in 1940 to Winston Churchill. A government is not formed by a vote of the House of Commons, it is a commission from the monarch. The House of Commons gets its first chance to indicate confidence in the new government when it votes on the Speech from the throne (the legislative programme proposed by the new government).

==== House of Lords ====
The House of Lords was previously a largely hereditary aristocratic chamber, although including life peers, and Lords Spiritual. It is currently midway through extensive reforms, the most recent of these being enacted in the House of Lords Act 1999, in which it sought to reduce the number of hereditary peers within the Lords to remove their automatic right to sit and vote. Although, through negotiation, 92 peers remain temporarily in the Lords. However, in September 2024, Starmer's Labour government introduced the House of Lords (Hereditary Peers) Bill. The bill strives to remove all individuals who hold legislative positions, resulting from birthright, to improve democratic representation within the legislative system - this is expected to become law by the end of 2025 (or early 2026). The house consists of two very different types of member, the Lords Temporal and Lords Spiritual. Lords Temporal include appointed members (life peers with no hereditary right for their descendants to sit in the house) and ninety-two remaining hereditary peers, elected from among, and by, the holders of titles which previously gave a seat in the House of Lords. The Lords Spiritual represent the established Church of England and number twenty-six: the Five Ancient Sees (Canterbury, York, London, Winchester and Durham), and the 21 next-most senior bishops. Secular organisations such as Humanists UK oppose bishops sitting in the House of Lords. The movement to end the Church of England's status as the official state religion of the United Kingdom is known as disestablishmentarianism. Alternatives include a secular state in which the state purports to be officially neutral in matters of religion.

The House of Lords currently acts to review legislation initiated by the House of Commons, with the power to propose amendments, and can exercise a suspensive veto. This allows it to delay legislation if it does not approve it for twelve months. However, the use of vetoes is limited by convention and by the operation of the Parliament Acts 1911 and 1949: the Lords may not veto the "money bills" or major manifesto promises (see Salisbury convention). Persistent use of the veto can also be overturned by the Commons, under a provision of the Parliament Act 1911. Often governments will accept changes in legislation in order to avoid both the time delay, and the negative publicity of being seen to clash with the Lords. However the Lords still retain a full veto in acts which would extend the life of parliament beyond the 5-year term limit introduced by the Parliament Act 1911.

The Constitutional Reform Act 2005 outlined plans for a Supreme Court of the United Kingdom to replace the role of the Law Lords.

The Supreme Court of the United Kingdom replaced the House of Lords as the final court of appeal on civil cases within the United Kingdom on 1 October 2009.

=== Devolved national parliaments ===
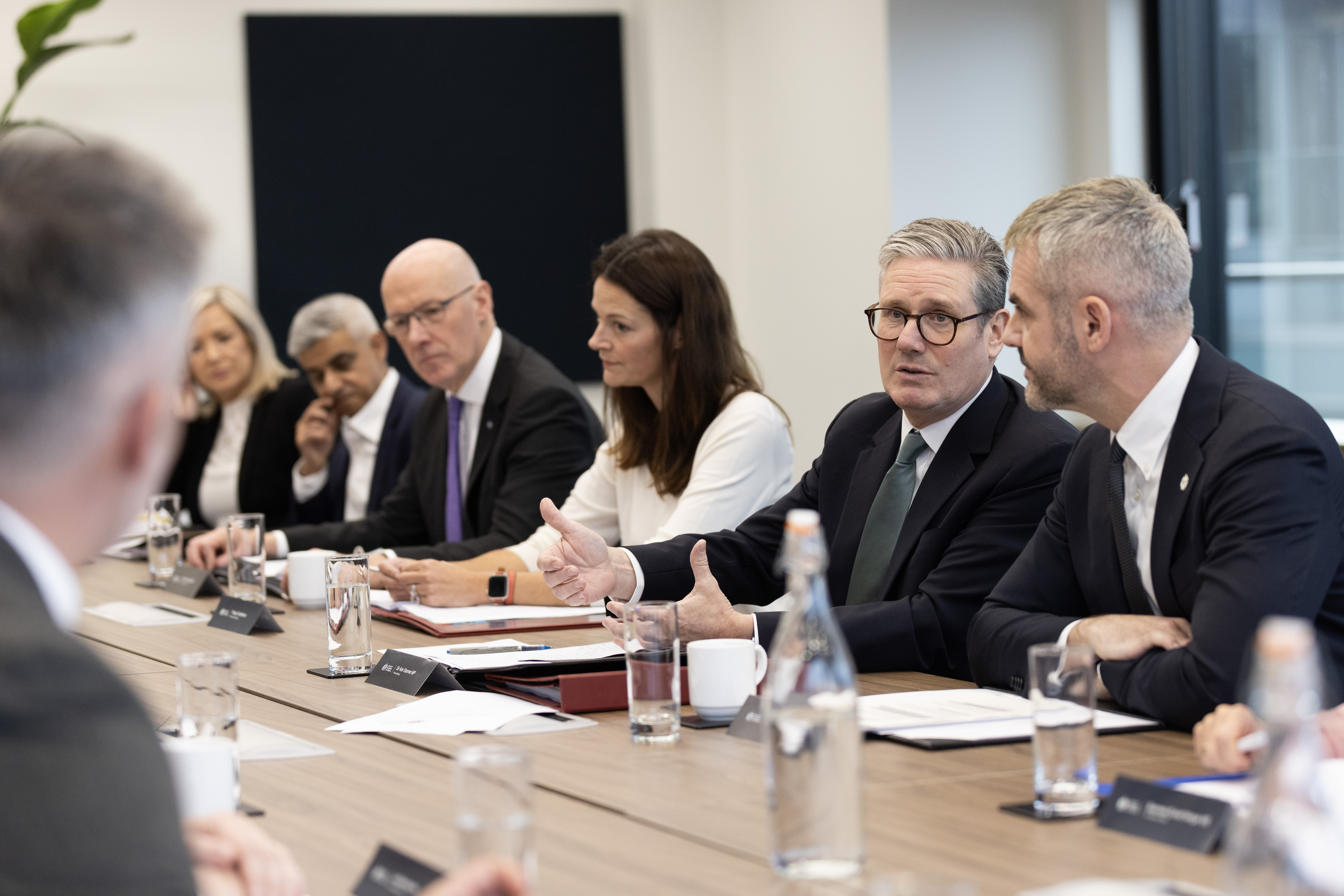
A meeting of the Council of the Nations and Regions which brings together the prime minister, first ministers of Scotland, Northern Ireland and Wales as well as the regional mayors in England

Though the British parliament remains the sovereign parliament, Scotland and Wales have devolved parliaments and Northern Ireland has an assembly. Each can have its powers broadened, narrowed or changed by an act of the UK Parliament. Both the Scottish Parliament and the Welsh Senedd gained legislative power over some forms of taxation between 2012 and 2016. Their power over economic issues is significantly constrained by an act of parliament passed in 2020.

The UK is a unitary state with a devolved system of government. This contrasts with a federal system, in which sub-parliaments or state parliaments and assemblies have a clearly defined constitutional right to exist and a right to exercise certain constitutionally guaranteed and defined functions and cannot be unilaterally abolished by acts of the central parliament. All three devolved parliaments are elected by proportional representation: the additional-member system is used in Scotland, a closed list form of proportional representation of is used in Wales, and single transferable vote is used in Northern Ireland.

England, therefore, is the only country in the UK not to have its own devolved parliament. However, senior politicians of all main parties have voiced concerns in regard to the West Lothian question, which is raised where certain policies for England are set by MPs from all four constituent nations whereas similar policies for Scotland or Wales might be decided in the devolved assemblies by legislators from those countries alone (named after former prime minister Gordon Brown's parliamentary seat). In 2015, English votes for English laws was proposed which would allow for laws relating to England (and when deemed relevant Wales), that nations respective MPs would be the only MPs that would be able to vote on laws relating to the aforementioned countries, though the proposal was later scrapped in 2021.

Various forms of regional devolution in England have taken place since Scottish and Welsh devolution. Regions of England were established in 1994, with powers expanded in 1999 by the Regional Development Agencies Act 1998, though these were later abolished in 2010. A series of referendums were planned for local devolution beginning in London's 1998 referendum forming the London Assembly and Mayor of London in 2000, though further plans ceased following a loss in a 2004 North East referendum. Following the passage of the Local Democracy, Economic Development and Construction Act 2009, combined authorities began being created in 2014, and have been expanding ever since then with agreements of local governments.

==== Scottish Parliament ====
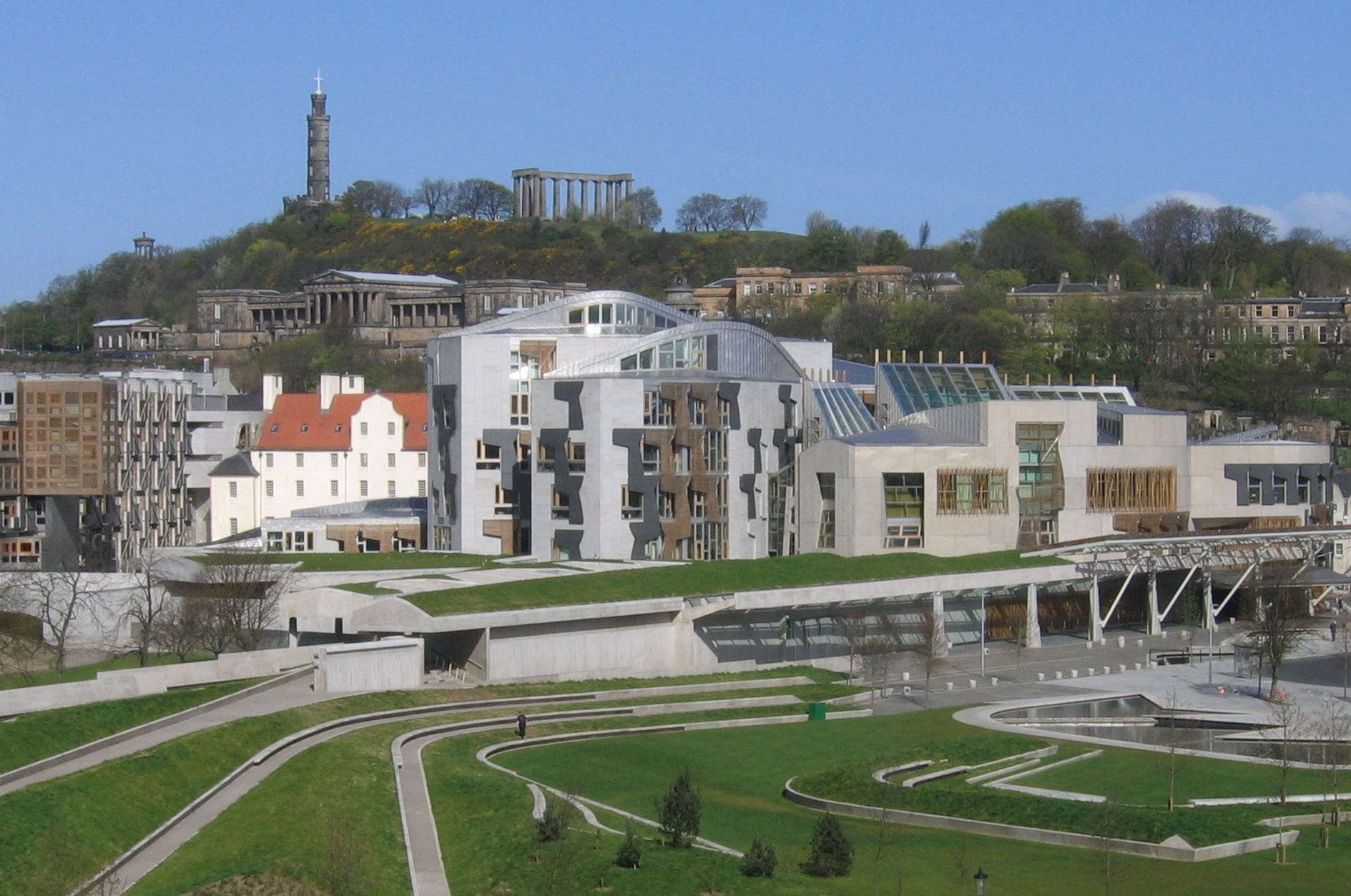
The Scottish Parliament Building in Holyrood, Edinburgh, seat of the Scottish Parliament.

The Scottish Parliament is the national, unicameral legislature of Scotland, located in the Holyrood area of the capital Edinburgh. The Parliament, informally referred to as "Holyrood" (cf. "Westminster"), is a democratically elected body comprising 129 members who are known as Members of the Scottish Parliament, or MSPs. Members are elected for five-year terms under the mixed-member proportional representation system. As a result, 73 MSPs represent individual geographical constituencies elected by the plurality ("first past the post") system, with a further 56 returned from eight additional member regions, each electing seven MSPs.

The current Scottish Parliament was established by the Scotland Act 1998 and its first meeting as a devolved legislature was on 12 May 1999. The parliament has the power to pass laws and has limited tax-varying capability. Another of its roles is to hold the Scottish Government to account. The "devolved matters" over which it has responsibility include education, health, agriculture, and justice. A degree of domestic authority, and all foreign policy, remains with the British Parliament in Westminster. The public take part in Parliament in a way that is not the case at Westminster through Cross-Party Groups on policy topics which the interested public join and attend meetings of alongside Members of the Scottish Parliament (MSPs).

==== Senedd ====
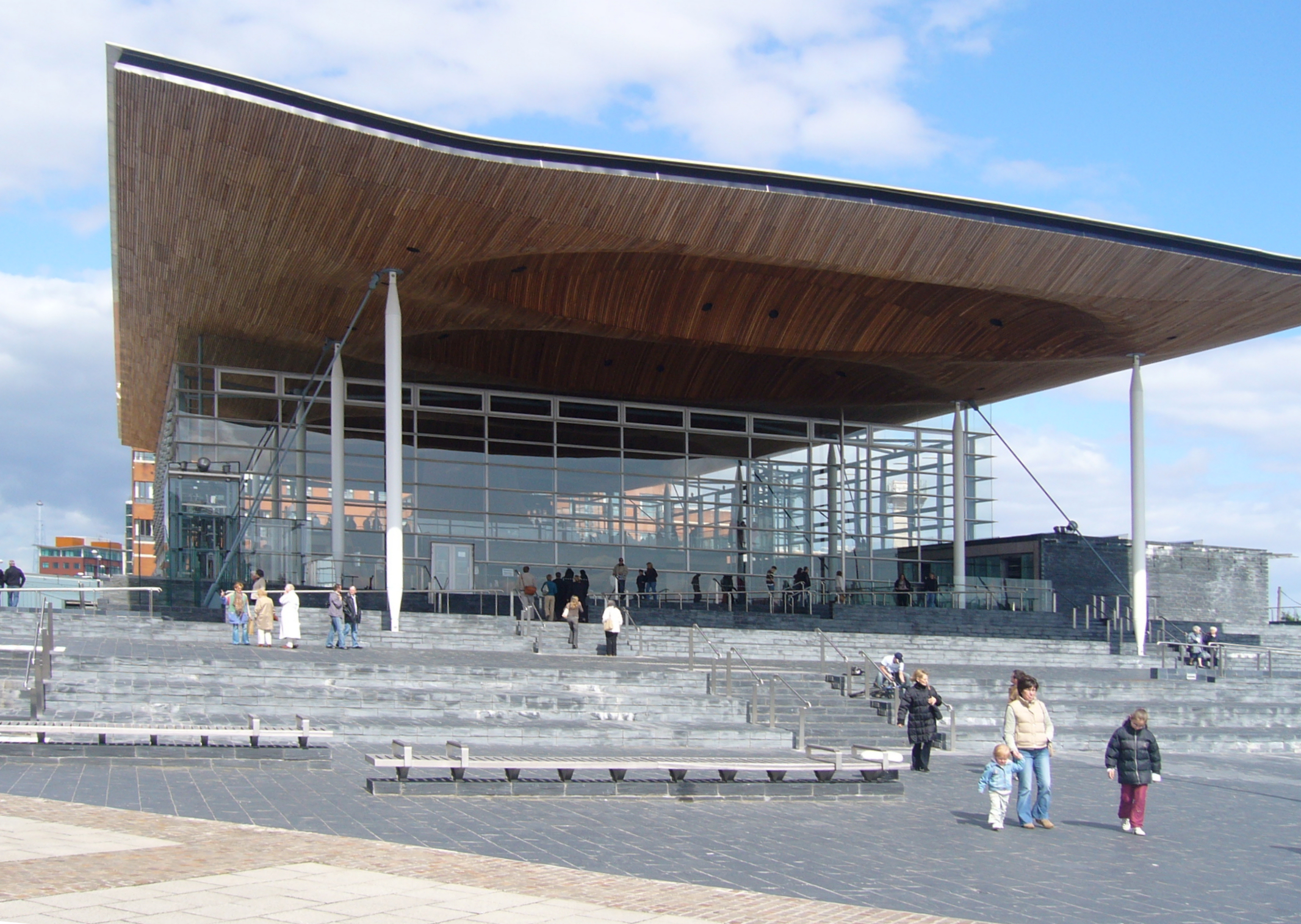
The Senedd building in Cardiff Bay

The Senedd (formerly the National Assembly for Wales) is the devolved legislature of Wales with power to make legislation and vary taxes. The Parliament comprises 96 members, who are known as Members of the Senedd, or MSs (Welsh: Aelodau o'r Senedd, ASau). Members are elected for four-year terms under a system of proportional representation, where six MSs from each of sixteen electoral regions are elected using the d'Hondt method.

The Welsh Parliament was created by the Government of Wales Act 1998, which followed a referendum in 1997. On its creation, most of the powers of the Welsh Office and Secretary of State for Wales were transferred to it. The Senedd had no powers to initiate primary legislation until limited law-making powers were gained through the Government of Wales Act 2006. Its primary law-making powers were enhanced following a Yes vote in the referendum on 3 March 2011, making it possible for it to legislate without having to consult the British parliament, nor the Secretary of State for Wales in the 20 areas that are devolved.

==== Northern Ireland Assembly ====
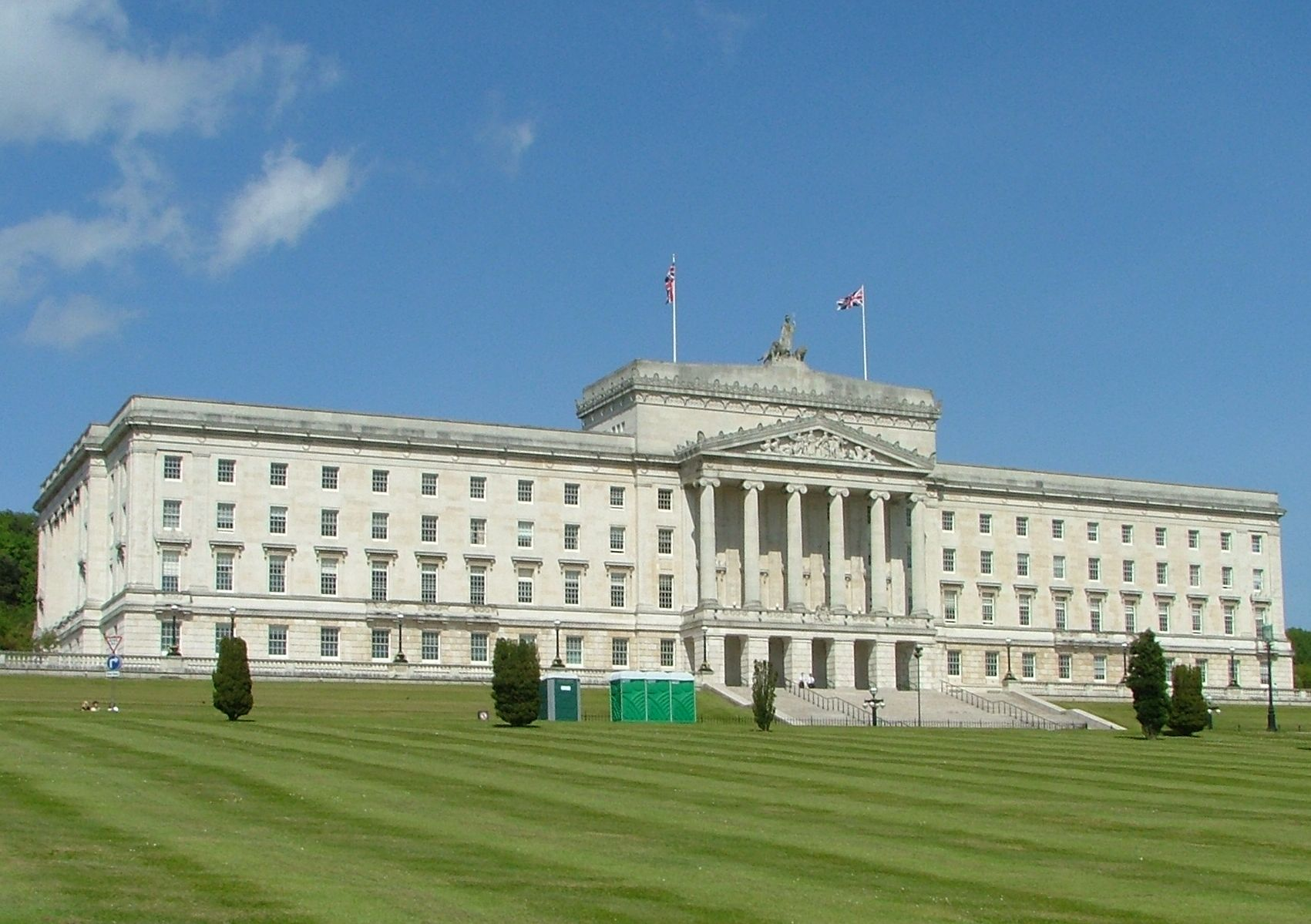
Parliament Buildings in Stormont, Belfast, seat of the Northern Ireland Assembly.

The government of Northern Ireland was established as a result of the 1998 Good Friday Agreement. This created the Northern Ireland Assembly. The Assembly is a unicameral body consisting of 90 members elected under the single transferable vote form of proportional representation. The Assembly is based on the principle of power-sharing, in order to ensure that both communities in Northern Ireland, unionist and nationalist, participate in governing the region. It has power to legislate in a wide range of areas and to elect the Northern Ireland Executive (cabinet). It sits at Parliament Buildings at Stormont in Belfast.

The Assembly has authority to legislate in a field of competences known as "transferred matters". These matters are not explicitly enumerated in the Northern Ireland Act 1998 but instead include any competence not explicitly retained by the Parliament at Westminster. Powers reserved by Westminster are divided into "excepted matters", which it retains indefinitely, and "reserved matters", which may be transferred to the competence of the Northern Ireland Assembly at a future date. Health, criminal law and education are "transferred" while royal relations are all "excepted".

While the Assembly was in suspension, due to issues involving the main parties and the Provisional Irish Republican Army (IRA), its legislative powers were exercised by the UK government, which effectively had power to legislate by decree. Laws that would normally be within the competence of the Assembly were passed by the UK government in the form of Orders-in-Council rather than legislative acts. There has been a significant decrease in violence over the last twenty years, though the situation remains tense, with the more hard-line parties such as Sinn Féin and the Democratic Unionist Party now holding the most parliamentary seats (see Demographics and politics of Northern Ireland).

== Judiciary ==
The United Kingdom does not have a single legal system due to it being created by the political union of previously independent countries with the terms of the Treaty of Union guaranteeing the continued existence of Scotland's separate legal system. Today the UK has three distinct systems of law: English law, Northern Ireland law and Scots law. Recent constitutional changes saw a new Supreme Court of the United Kingdom come into being in October 2009 that took on the appeal functions of the Appellate Committee of the House of Lords. The Judicial Committee of the Privy Council, comprising the same members as the Supreme Court, is the highest court of appeal for several independent Commonwealth countries, the UK overseas territories, and the British crown dependencies.

=== England, Wales and Northern Ireland ===
Both English law, which applies in England and Wales, and Northern Ireland law are based on common-law principles. The essence of common-law is that law is made by judges sitting in courts, applying their common sense and knowledge of legal precedent (stare decisis) to the facts before them. The Courts of England and Wales are headed by the Senior Courts of England and Wales, consisting of the Court of Appeal, the High Court of Justice (for civil cases) and the Crown Court (for criminal cases). The Supreme Court of the United Kingdom is the highest court in the land for both criminal and civil cases in England, Wales, and Northern Ireland and any decision it makes is binding on every other court in the hierarchy.

=== Scotland ===
Scots law, a hybrid system based on both common-law and civil-law principles, applies in Scotland. The chief courts are the Court of Session, for civil cases, and the High Court of Justiciary, for criminal cases. The Supreme Court of the United Kingdom serves as the highest court of appeal for civil cases under Scots law. Sheriff courts deal with most civil and criminal cases including conducting criminal trials with a jury, known as Sheriff solemn Court, or with a Sheriff and no jury, known as Sheriff summary Court. The Sheriff courts provide a local court service with 49 Sheriff courts organised across six Sheriffdoms.

== Electoral systems ==
The United Kingdom has a democracy with the Democracy Index rated the United Kingdom as a "full democracy" ranking 18th worldwide with an overall score of 8.28 out of a maximum of 10. Various electoral systems are used in the UK:

- The first-past-the-post system is used for general elections to the House of Commons and also for some local government elections in England and Wales. To be elected to the House of Commons, candidates require the biggest share of votes in their constituency of the 650 within the UK. This system works by whichever candidate receives the most votes in a given area is elected, resulting in candidates being elected with a plurality (receiving more votes than any other candidate), but not an absolute majority (50 percent plus one vote).
  - The plurality-at-large voting (the bloc vote) is a variant of first past the post, and is also used for some local government elections in England and Wales. The plurality system works by having multiple candidates stand in a region. Parties can stand the same number of candidates as are able to be elected and voters can vote for the same number of candidates. This can result in multiple of a single parties candidate being elected and faces similar problems to first-past-the-post.
- The additional-member system is used for elections to the Scottish Parliament, London Assembly, and was used Senedd until 2026, though can be implemented differently. The additional member's system used when electing members of parliament is a combination of the first-past-the-post system and the party-list system. Voters are given two ballots: one is for the candidates running to be elected as MP, and the other has a list of parties that are running for a seat in parliament. Voters choose their preferred party.
- The D'Hondt method of party-list proportional representation has been used in the Senedd since the 2026 Senedd election. Under this method, regions with multiple representatives are created, and seats are distributed by party based on vote share. The candidates from each party are then taken from a party list. This system was also formerly used for European Parliament elections in England, Scotland, and Wales before Brexit.
- The single transferable vote system is used in Northern Ireland to elect the Northern Ireland Assembly and to elect local councils in Scotland and Northern Ireland. Until Brexit it was also used in Northern Ireland to elect the Members of the European Parliament. Areas elect multiple representatives rather than the traditional one, representing a larger area. Voters rank their choices; they can rank as many as they choose since parties will run more than one candidate in each area. To be elected, candidates have to receive a specific number of votes, the quota, which is decided based on the number of vacancies and the number of people that can vote.
- The supplementary vote system is used to elect directly elected mayors in England, including the mayor of London since 2026. Under this system voters select a primary and secondary candidate. If a candidate receives over 50% of the primary vote they are elected. If this does not happen, all but the top two candidates remain and voters who voted for eliminated candidates, have they secondary votes redistributed. Whichever of the top two candidates has the most following this is elected. This system was also used to elect Mayors before 2022.

=== Electoral Reform ===
Elections and political parties in the United Kingdom are affected by Duverger's law, the political science principle that states that plurality voting systems, such as first-past-the-post, tend to lead to the development of two-party systems, although smaller parties have held a significant number of seat in parliament, though less than the two major parties. This has led to a belief that the system discriminates against smaller parties in national elections. This has led to a number of government governing with majorities despite 30–40% vote shares, with only two hung parliaments (parliaments without a majority) since World War II. No single party has won a majority of the popular vote since the Third National Government of Stanley Baldwin in 1935. On two occasions since World War II – 1951 and February 1974 – a party that came in second in the popular vote came out with the largest number of seats.

Because of this electoral reform for parliamentary elections has been proposed a number of times. The Jenkins Commission report in October 1998 suggested implementing the Alternative Vote Top-up (also called alternative vote plus or AV+) in parliamentary elections. Under this proposal, most MPs would be directly elected from constituencies by the alternative vote, with a number of additional members elected from "top-up lists." However, no action was taken by the Labour government at the time. There are several groups in the UK campaigning for electoral reform, including the Electoral Reform Society, Make Votes Count Coalition, and Fairshare.

The Conservatives and Liberal Democrats entered into a new coalition government, headed by David Cameron. Under the terms of the coalition agreement, the government committed itself to holding a referendum in May 2011 on whether to change parliamentary elections from first-past-the-post to alternative vote. Electoral reform was a major priority for the Liberal Democrats, who favour proportional representation but were able to negotiate only a referendum on AV (the alternative vote system is not a form of proportional representation) with the Conservatives. The coalition partners campaigned on opposite sides, with the Liberal Democrats supporting AV and the Conservatives opposing it. The referendum resulted in the Conservatives' favour, and the first-past-the-post system was maintained.

== Political parties ==
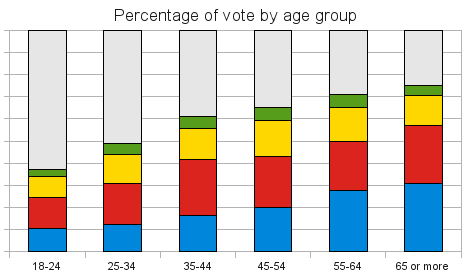
2005 general election results by age group: voters for Conservative (blue), Labour (red), Lib Dem (yellow), other parties (green); and those not voting (grey).

Since the 1920s the two main political parties in the UK, in terms of the number of seats in the House of Commons, are the Conservative and Unionist Party and the Labour Party. Regional parties hold significant power in devolved parliaments, but don't field candidates outside their nations. There are also a number of minor political parties that have elected representation in the House of Commons.

The Liberal Party was one of the two dominant parties (along with the Conservatives) from its founding until the 1920s, when it rapidly declined in popularity, and was supplanted on the left by the Labour Party, which was founded in 1900 and formed its first minority government in 1924.

=== Labour ===
The Labour Party is a big-tent, centre-left to left-wing political party and has been one of the two major political parties of the UK, throughout the 20th and 21st century. They have a broadly social democratic or democratic socialist ideology, though party positions differ over time and within the party. The party is currently the largest party in the House of Commons and is currently led by Andy Burnham, who has been leader of the party since 2026. The Labour Party won 411 seats in the House of Commons at the 2024 general election making them the party with the largest number of seats, allowing them to form a majority government under Keir Starmer.

The history of the Labour Party goes back to 1900, when a Labour Representation Committee was established and changed its name to "The Labour Party" in 1906. After 1918, this led to the demise of the Liberal Party as the main reformist force in British politics. The existence of the Labour Party on the left wing of British politics led to a slow waning of energy from the Liberal Party, which has consequently assumed third place in national politics. After performing poorly at the general elections of 1922, 1923 and 1924, the Liberal Party was superseded by the Labour Party as being the party of the left. Following two brief spells in minority governments in 1924 and 1929–1931, the party was part of the Churchill war ministry during World War II. When the war ended the Labour Party won a landslide victory at the 1945 "khaki election"; winning a majority for the first time ever. The Labour Party suffered the three consecutive general election defeats from 1951 to 1964, before regaining power with Harold Wilson.

At the 1979 general election, James Callaghan's Labour government was defeated following the Winter of Discontent, led to the Labour Party losing power from 1979 to 1997 over four consecutive general election. The Labour Party elected left-winger Michael Foot as their leader in 1980, and he responded to dissatisfaction within the Labour Party by pursuing a number of radical policies developed by its grassroots members, leading to several centrist and right-leaning Labour MPs splintering, forming a breakaway group called the Social Democratic Party (SDP). The Labour Party was defeated in a landslide at the 1983 general election, and Michael Foot was replaced shortly thereafter by Neil Kinnock as party leader. Kinnock progressively expelled members on Militant, left-wing wing of the party, and moderated many of the party's policies. Despite these changes, as well as electoral gains and also due to Kinnock's negative media image, Labour was defeated at the 1987 and 1992 general elections, and he was succeeded by Shadow Chancellor of the Exchequer, John Smith.

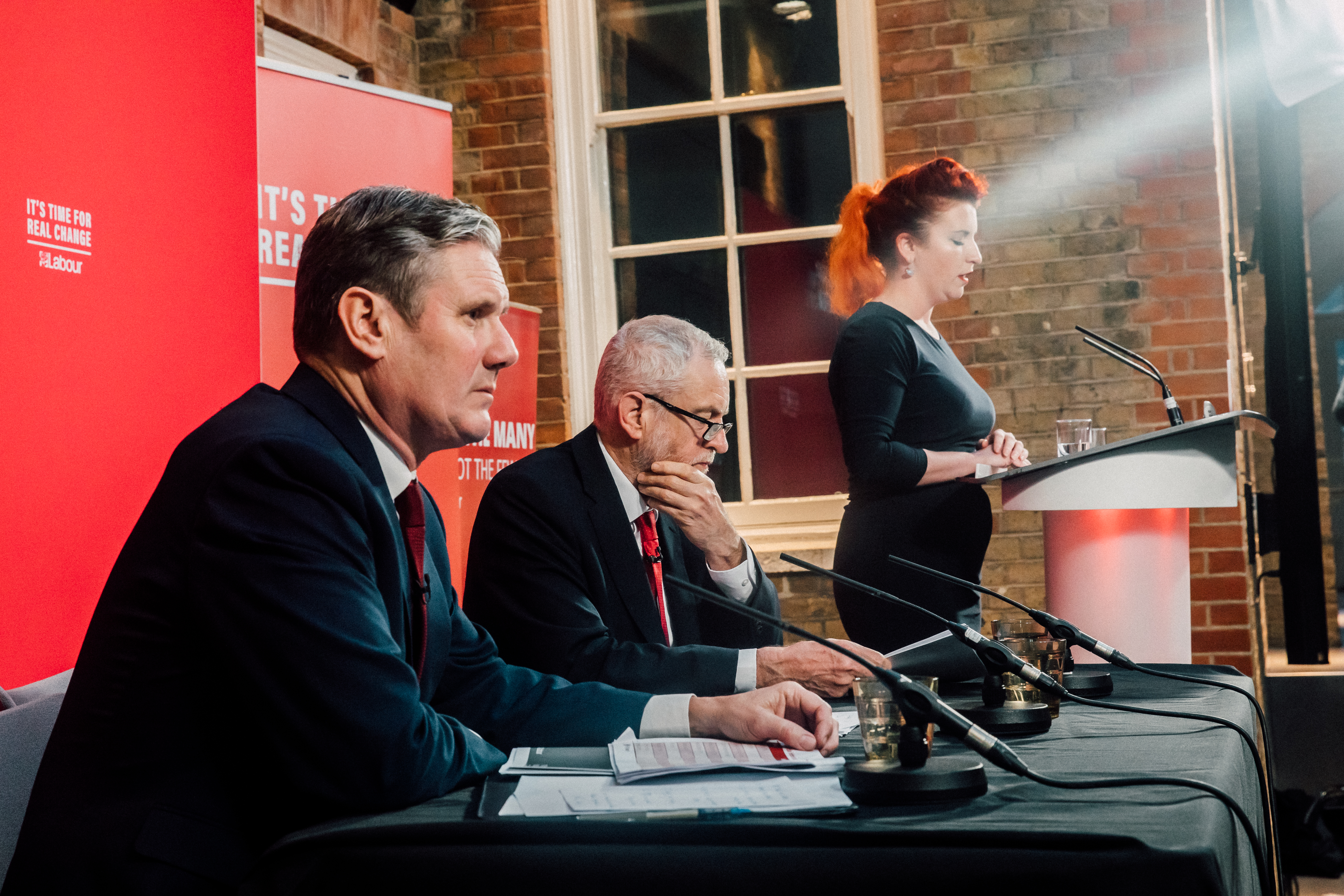
Former prime minister and Leader of the Labour Party, Keir Starmer with former party leader Jeremy Corbyn.

Shadow Home Secretary Tony Blair became Leader of the Labour Party following Smith's sudden death from a heart attack in 1994. He continued to move the Labour Party towards the "centre" with neoliberal policies under the "New Labour" branding and won the 1997 election with an overall landslide victory after eighteen consecutive years of Conservative rule.. Under "New Labour", the Human Rights Act and National Minimum Wage Act were passed in 1998. After Blair's resignation in 2007, Chancellor of the Exchequer Gordon Brown became Leader of the party and Prime Minister, though would resign following 2010 general election, after failing to secure a coalition agreement with the Liberal Democrats. Ed Miliband would then take over as leader of the Labour party, but would resign following the loss in the 2015 general election.

This would then lead to the 2015 Labour Party leadership election, where Jeremy Corbyn would win through the party membership despite low support among fellow Labour MPs. He led the party till a loss in the 2019 general election, although facing a leadership challenge in 2017 due to handling over the EU referendum campaign (which he would later win), and accusations of Antisemitism in the Labour Party. Following this Keir Starmer would be elected following the 2020 Labour Party leadership election, and would go on to win the 2024 general election and become Prime minister, following 14 year of conservative rule.

Labour has historically garnered strong support in devolved parliaments, winning the most seats in the first two Scottish Parliament elections, and winning all Welsh assembly elections until 2026. They also have won the most seats in Wales in the past century, and currently hold the most MPs from Scotland. A subset of Labour MPs stand as joint Labour and Co-operative candidates due to a long-standing electoral alliance between the Labour Party and the Co-operative Party – the political arm of the British co-operative movement.

=== Conservatives (Tories) ===
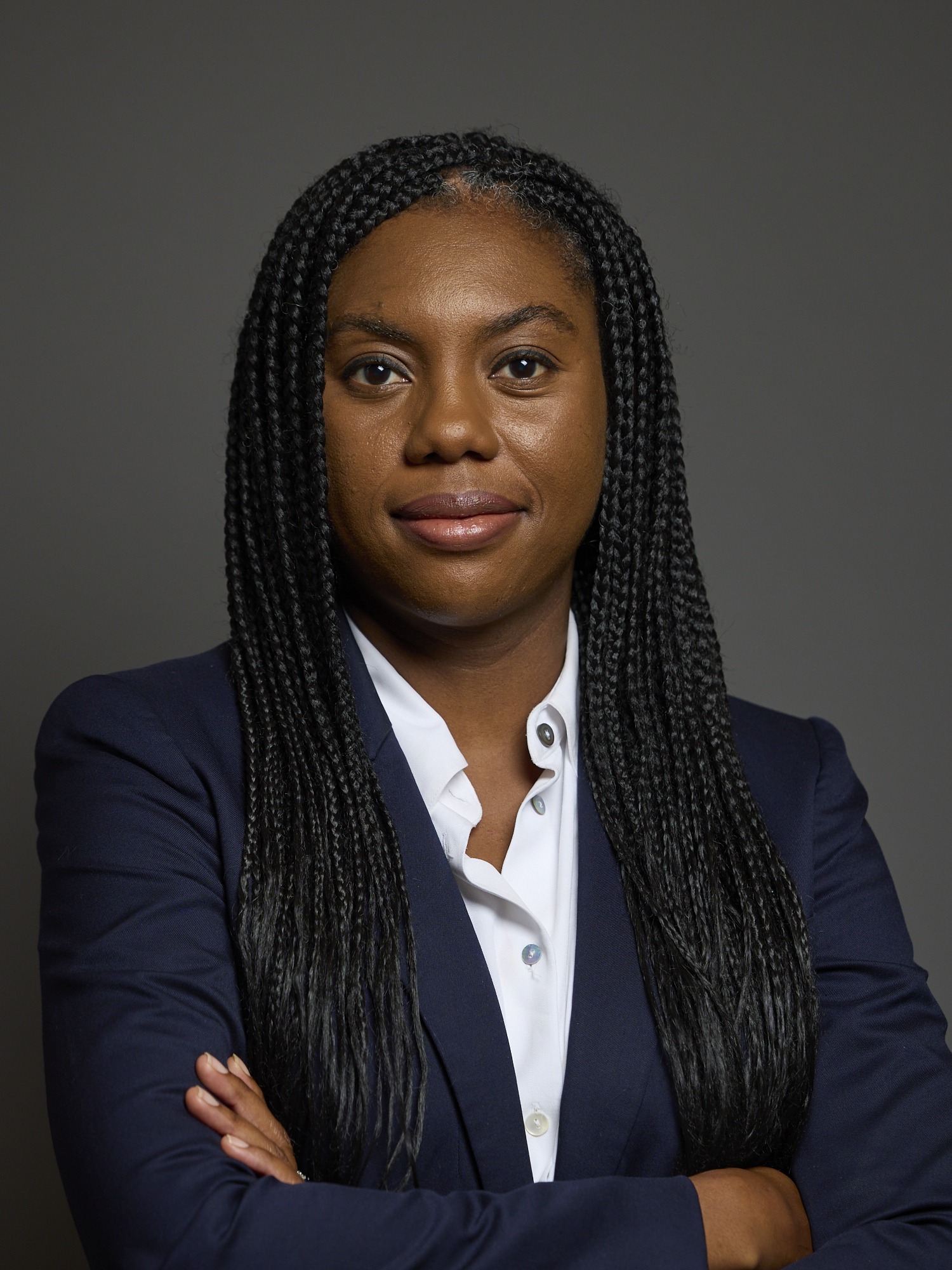
Leader of the Conservative and Unionist Party and Leader of the Opposition, Kemi Badenoch.

The Conservative and Unionist Party has been the major big-tent centre-right to right-wing political party, and one of the two major political parties of the UK in the 20th and 21st century. They have a broadly conservative ideology, though party positions differ over time and within the party. The party is currently the opposition party in the House of Commons and is currently led by Kemi Badenoch, who has been leader of the party since 2024. The party won 121 seats at the 2024 general election, making it the second-largest group in the House of Commons.

The Conservative Party can trace its origin back to 1662, with the Court Party and the Country Party being formed in the aftermath of the English Civil War. The Court Party soon became known as the Tories, a name that has stuck despite the official name being 'Conservative'. The term "Tory" originates from the Exclusion Crisis of 1678–1681 – the Whigs were those who supported the exclusion of the Roman Catholic Duke of York from the thrones of England, Ireland and Scotland, and the Tories were those who opposed it. Generally, the Tories were associated with lesser gentry and the Church of England, while Whigs were more associated with trade, money, larger land holders (or "land magnates"), expansion and tolerance of Catholicism. The Rochdale Radicals were a group of more extreme reformists who were also heavily involved in the cooperative movement. They sought to bring about a more equal society, and are considered by modern standards to be left-wing.

After becoming associated with repression of popular discontent in the years after 1815, the Tories underwent a fundamental transformation under the influence of Robert Peel, himself an industrialist rather than a landowner, who in his 1834 "Tamworth Manifesto" outlined a new "Conservative" philosophy of reforming ills while conserving the good. Though Peel's supporters subsequently split from their colleagues over the issue of free trade in 1846, ultimately joining the Whigs and the Radicals to form what would become the Liberal Party, Peel's version of the party's underlying outlook was retained by the remaining Tories, who adopted his label of Conservative as the official name of their party.

The Conservatives were in government for eighteen years between 1979 and 1997, under the leadership of the first-ever female prime minister, Margaret Thatcher, and former chancellor of the exchequer John Major (1990–97), where they pursued policies of privatisation, anti-trade-unionism, and, for a time, monetarism, now known collectively as Thatcherism. The 1997 general election saw the Conservative Party lose over half their seats gained in 1992 and saw them lose all their seats in both Scotland and Wales, and was the worst defeat by a party since 1931. In 2008, the Conservative Party formed a pact with the Ulster Unionist Party (UUP) to select joint candidates for European and House of Commons elections; this angered the DUP as by splitting the Unionist vote, republican parties will be elected in some areas.

After thirteen years in opposition, the Conservatives returned to power as part of a coalition agreement with the Liberal Democrats in 2010, going on to form a majority government following the 2015 general election, to form the first Conservative majority government since the 1992 general election. David Cameron announced the Brexit referendum following increased support for the UK Independence Party, though campaigned against it, and following the result resigned as prime minister. Theresa May then became prime minister, and in 2017 called a general election in hope to increase the conservative majority to diffuse party opposition to her deal to leave the EU. The Conservatives won a slim minority, but went on to form a confidence and supply deal with the Democratic Unionist Party (DUP), allowing the Conservative Party to remain in government.

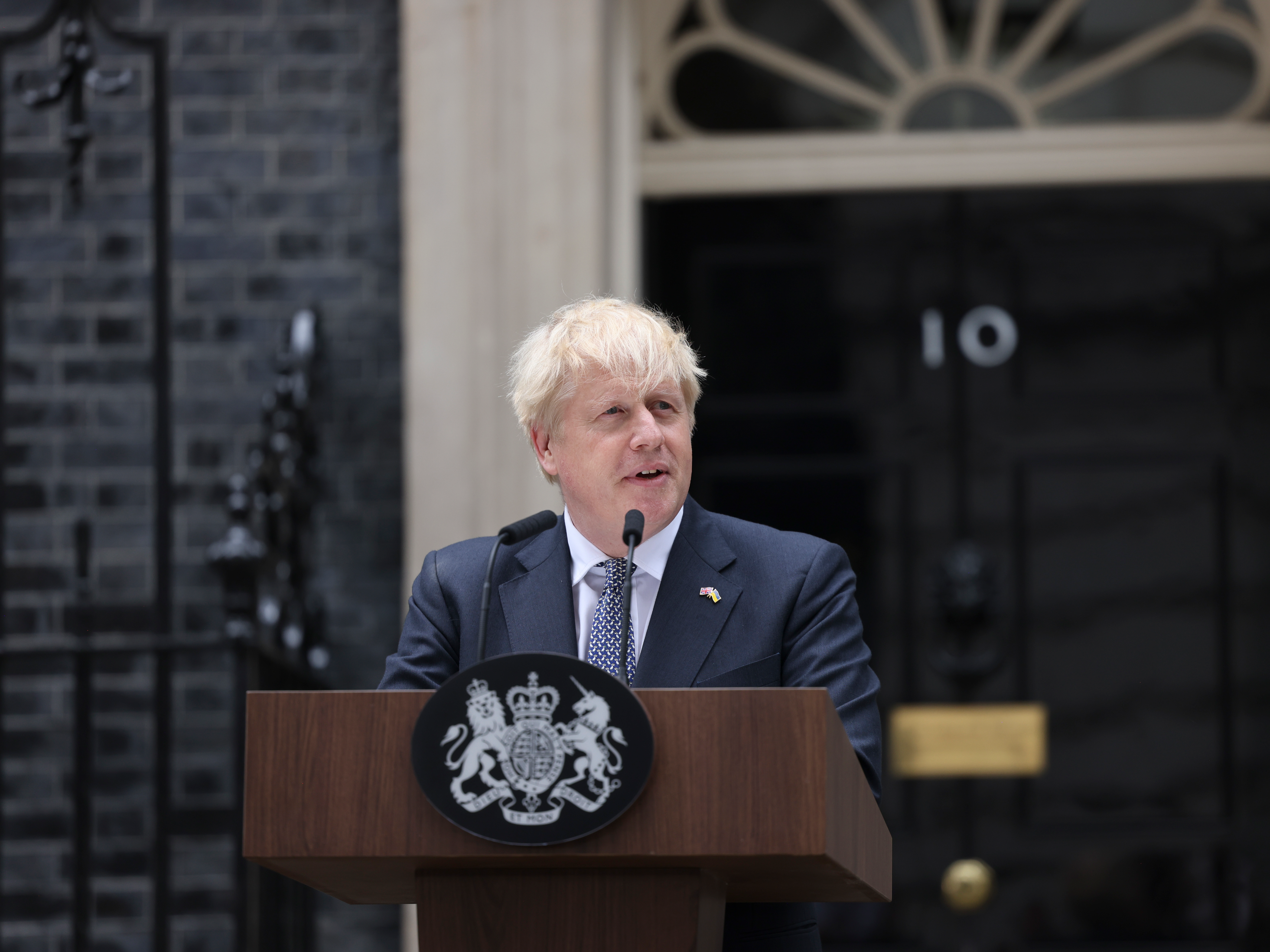
Former prime minister Boris Johnson gives his resignation speech.

In 2019, Boris Johnson was appointed prime minister after May stepped down during Brexit negotiations. In August 2019, Prime Minister Boris Johnson requested the monarch to prorogue the British parliament amid Brexit negotiations, causing the 2019 British prorogation controversy. The decision was annulled amid a number of legal challenges, and led to a loss in their majority following an MP defecting to the Liberal Democrats. When parliament returned, the government lost a vote to control the agenda in parliament, with 14 conservative MPs voting against them, for which they were then expelled from the party further decreasing their majority. Johnson called for the 2019 general election in hopes of getting a majority, following parliamentary deadlock over the Brexit deal. He achieved this and passed a Brexit deal, but later stepped down as prime minister in because of the Partygate Scandal.

Following a Conservative leadership election, Liz Truss was appointed as leader of the party and prime minister, but resigned a month later following the effects of the September 2022 mini-budget. She was quickly replaced by Rishi Sunak, running unopposed after coming second in the previous leadership election, although he too stepped down following the 2024 general election, where the Conservatives returned with their fewest number of seats in history. Kemi Badenoch won the 2024 Conservative Party leadership election, to become Leader of the Opposition.

=== Liberal Democrats ===
The Liberal Democrats (Lib Dems) are a centre to centre-left party in the UK, and are led by Ed Davey. They follow an ideology of liberalism, advocating for electoral reform, reduction in the voting age, and pro-europeanism. The Liberal Democrats won the third largest number of seats at the 2024 general election, returning 72 MPs.

The Liberal Democrats were founded in 1988 by an amalgamation of the Liberal Party with the Social Democratic Party, but can trace their origin back to the Whigs and the Rochdale Radicals who evolved into the Liberal Party. The term 'Liberal Party' was first used officially in 1868, though it had been in use colloquially for decades beforehand. The Liberal Party formed a government in 1868 and then alternated with the Conservative Party as the party of government throughout the late-nineteenth century and early-twentieth century. The modern Liberal Party had been founded in 1859 as an outgrowth of the Whig movement or party (which began at the same time as the Tory Party and was its historical rival) as well as the Radical and Peelite tendencies.

In the 2010 election, David Cameron formed a coalition government with Nick Clegg, beginning the Liberal Democrats first time in government. During this time, the Liberal democrats helped achieve: legislation consisted of setting a five-year interval between general elections, a Scottish independence referendum, and a referendum to change the voting system. The coalition ended following the Conservatives achieving a majority at the 2015 general election, with the Liberal Democrats coming fourth due to the rise of the SNP. Following the election Clegg stepped down as leader with Tim Farron, Vince Cable, and Jo Swinson becoming party leader. Following an even worse defeat during the 2019 general election, Swinson resigned as Lib Dem leader after losing her own seat. Following the 2020 Liberal Democrats leadership election Ed Davey became leader of the Liberal Democrats and was able to increase the party's share of seats in the 2024 general election.

=== Reform UK ===
Reform UK is a populist, right-wing to far-right political party led by Nigel Farage. The party is populist politics, strongly anti-immigration and anti-European. They currently have current total to eight MPs, after winning five during the 2024 general election, and won the most seats in the 2026 local elections. They are also the second largest party in the Senedd operating the opposition, and joint second in the Scottish parliament.

The Brexit Party was founded in January 2019, with leader Nigel Farage (former retired UKIP leader). It initially had 14 MEPs, all of whom had been elected as members of UKIP. In the 2019 European Parliament election in the United Kingdom, it returned 29 MEPs, until the UK withdrawal from the EU. It was then reconstituted into the Reform Party, and has since supplanted of the now extra parliamentary United Kingdom Independence Party (UKIP), and has since gained eight seats in parliament, following a series of deflection, suspensions, and election victories. Whilst formerly being a minor party, it has significantly grown in recent years, and is a contender to win the most seats in the next general election.

=== Scottish National Party ===
The Scottish National Party is a broadly centre-left, pro-independence political party and currently leads a minority government in the Scottish Parliament. They are currently led by John Swinney, who is the First Minister of Scotland. The SNP is the largest part in the Scottish Parliament in the 2026 Scottish Parliament election with 58 of 129 seats, and won nine seats in House of Commons in the 2024 general election.

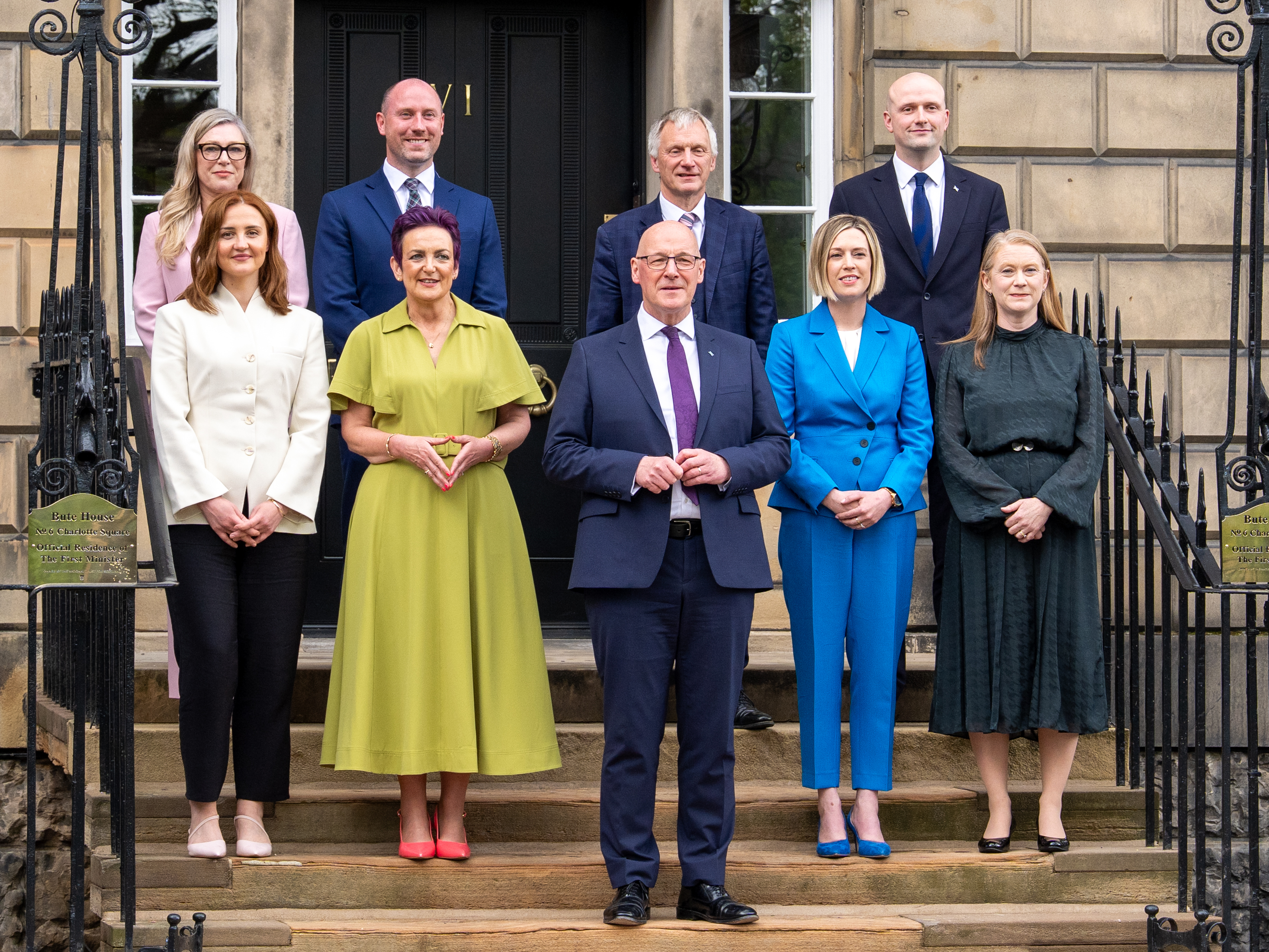
The Current Scottish Government (the Second Swinney government), led by John Swinney, standing outside Bute House.

The SNP was formed in 1934 through the merger of the National Party of Scotland and the Scottish Party, the party was founded to advocate for the "self-government for Scotland". They won their first seat in the 1945 Motherwell by-election, and after the first Scottish parliament election gained 35 of 129 seats. They have had continuous representation in Parliament since 1967 and holds significant support in Scotland. Following the 2007 Scottish parliamentary elections, the SNP emerged as the largest party with 47 MSPs and formed a minority government with Alex Salmond as First Minister and has stayed in the Scottish Government since. After the 2011 Scottish parliamentary election, the SNP won enough seats to form a majority government, the first time this had ever happened since devolution was established in 1999, leading the British government to give permission to hold a 2014 Scottish independence referendum, which the SNP then lost. Following this, Salmond stepped down allowing Nicola Sturgeon to become first minister.

The party was just short of an overall majority at the 2016 Scottish parliamentary elections, and the party operated a minority government. Following further losses at the Scottish parliament elections in 2021, the SNP and the Scottish Greens won the right to form a Scottish coalition government in May 2021. The precise arrangement was loose and allows the Greens freedom to criticise official SNP policy on key areas of disagreement, though this coalition fell apart in 2024. Earlier in 2023, Sturgeon had resigned due to occupational burnout, being replaced by Humza Yousaf. Following the coalition breaking down, Yousaf also resigned, leading to John Swinney was elected following the 2024 Scottish National Party leadership election, and has led a minority government since.

=== The Green Party of England and Wales ===
The Green Party of England and Wales is a left-wing, green politics party in England and Wales. The party's ideology calls for increased environmental policy, as well as redistributive economic policy. In the 2024 UK general election the Greens won four seats, and expanded that to five following the Gorton and Denton by-election. It also has three seats on the London Assembly and over 1300 local councillors as of May 2026. Since the election of London Assembly member Zack Polanski as leader of the party, the Greens have experienced significant growth in their polling figures and membership numbers.

The party first won the seat in parliament of Ceredigion during the 1992 general election, where Cynog Dafis ran on a joint Plaid Cymru/Green Party ticket. The party then had a single MP, Caroline Lucas, from 2010 until the 2024 UK general election, where the party won four additional seats. Following the 2025 Green Party leadership election, Zack Polanski became leader of the party and has shifted the party's political messaging, toward left wing economic messaging as the party was previously thought of as a single-issue party.

=== Plaid Cymru ===
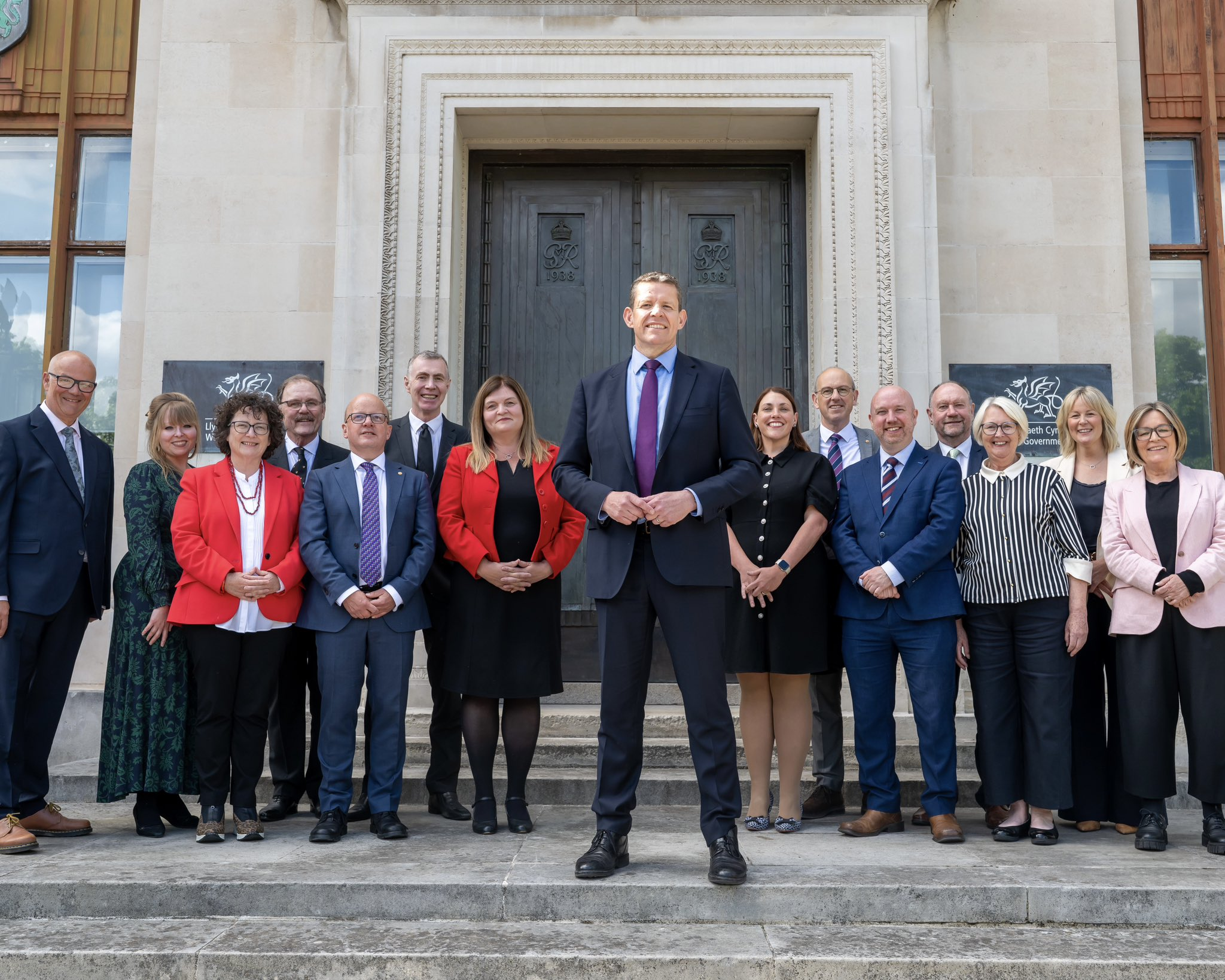
The current Ap Iorwerth government, standing in front of Crown Buildings, Cathays Park.

Plaid Cymru is a centre-left to left-wing Welsh nationalist party, and currently hold five of the 32 Welsh seats in Westminster, following the 2025 Caerphilly by-election, and is led by First Minister of Wales Rhun ap Iorwerth. Plaid have the highest number of seats in the Senedd, and currently operate a minority government.

Plaid Cymru formed in 1925 by Plaid Cymru has enjoyed parliamentary representation continuously since 1974. Following the 2007 Welsh Assembly elections, they joined Labour as the junior partner in a coalition government until 2011. Rhun ap Iorwerth was elected as leader of the party in 2023, following allegations of "a culture of bullying, harassment and misogyny" in the party. Plaid's support has grown a lot through the premiership of Keir Starmer, leading to a successful 2026 Senedd election, where they were elected as the largest party in the Senedd and formed a minority government.

=== Northern Ireland parties ===
Political parties in Northern Ireland are largely independent from political parties in the rest of the United Kingdom, though have previously formed coalitions. Party's are largely formed by disagreements between Unionism and Republicanism, with left wing parties largely in favour of reunification with Ireland, and conservative parties in favour of remaining as part of the UK. This also heavily divided along Catholic and Protestant lines. In Northern Ireland, 17 of 18 MPs are from six parties that only contest elections in Northern Ireland, with the exception being one independent MP.

Results of the 2022 Northern Ireland Assembly election.

Sinn Fein are a left-wing political party, operating in Northern and the Republic of Ireland, believing in a united Ireland. As of the 2024 United Kingdom general election seven Sinn Féin MPs, but continued a policy of abstentionism from the House of Commons and refuse to take their seats in what they view as a "foreign" parliament. They are currently the largest party in the Northern Ireland Assembly and hold the position of first minister of Northern Ireland. The other major nationalist party is Social Democratic and Labour Party (SDLP) with two members of parliament and eight in the eight members of the Northern Irish National Assembly.

The Democratic Unionist Party (DUP) is a right-wing, unionist party than is the second largest party in The Northern Irish Assembly, holding the position of deputy First Minister of Northern Ireland. Founded in 1971 by Ian Paisley, it has grown to become the larger of the two main unionist political parties in Northern Ireland. Following the 2024 general election, five MPs were elected. The other major unionist parties in Northern Ireland are the Ulster Unionist Party (UUP), who have one MP and nine in the assembly, and the Traditional Unionist Voice, who have one MP and another in the Northern Irish assembly.

There is also the centrist non-sectarian Alliance Party of Northern Ireland, who currently hold one seat in parliament and 17 in the Northern Ireland Assembly.

=== Other parliamentary parties ===
Your Party is a left-wing political party formed in July 2025, by former leader of the Labour Party Jeremy Corbyn, and expelled member of the Labour Party Zarah Sultana, following efforts from Keir Starmer to moderate the Labour Party political positions. The party has been mired in internal political turbulence. The party has a number of local councillors but efforts to create a party of the left were squandered by election of Zack Polanski to the Green Party, and their increased popularity.

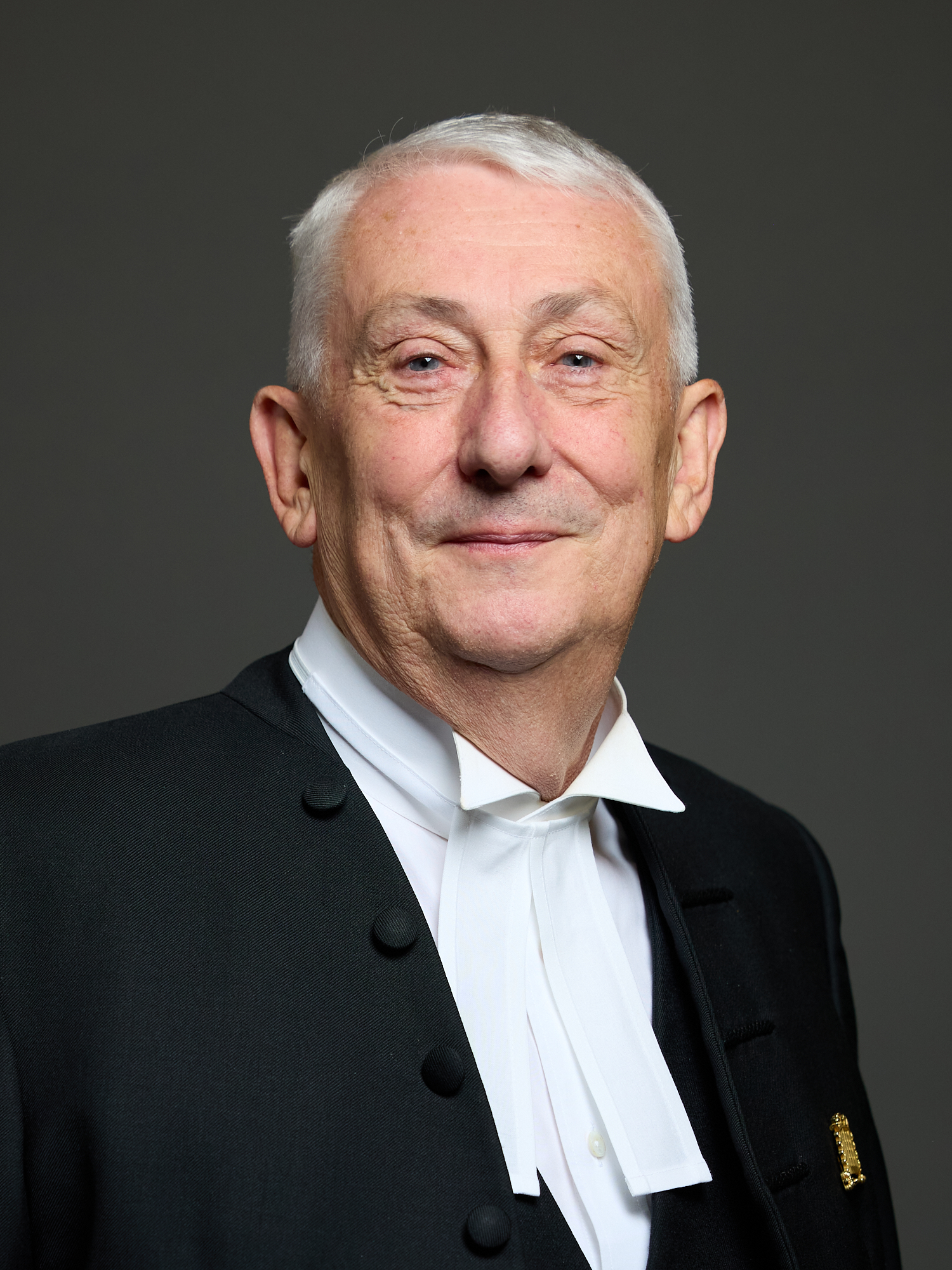
Current Speaker of the House of Commons, Lindsay Hoyle who stands as an independent politician.

Restore Britain is a far-right political party formed in June 2025, following a fissure in Reform UK. They won a number of local council positions in the area around Great Yarmouth, with the corresponding seat in parliament, being represented by Lowe who was elected in as a Reform candidate, during the 2024 general election. The party holds strong conservative and anti-immigration positions.

There are usually a small number of independent politicians in parliament with no party allegiance. They are more prominent in local and council elections, sometimes forming agreements with other independent politicians. The House of Commons Speaker, stands as an independent politician, though large political parties traditionally don't stand in said elections. The current speaker is Lindsay Hoyle who revoked his Labour affiliation after the 2019 Speaker election. In modern times, this has usually occurred when a sitting member leaves their party, and some such MPs have been re-elected as independents. Between 1950 and 2023, only two new members were elected as independents without having ever stood for a major party, being Martin Bell and Dr. Richard Taylor. Six independent MPs were elected at the 2024 UK general election, predominantly representing Muslim majority constituencies.

=== Non-Parliamentary political parties ===
Other political parties exist, but struggle to return MPs to Parliament.

The Scottish Greens have 15 MSPs in the Scottish Parliament following the 2026 Scottish Parliament election, and following the 2021 Scottish Parliament election were the junior partner in the SNP/Green coalition. Northern Ireland also has a Green Party and has previously had MLAs in the Northern Ireland Assembly, but currently only have five local councillors.

The UK Independence Party (UKIP) has been the largest far-right party in the UK having previously had MPs, gaining the third-largest share of the vote in the 2015 general election, and the largest share of the vote of any party (27%) in the 2014 European elections, though have since fallen into obscurity. There have also been a number of minor far-right parties that have enjoyed limited electoral success, particularly in local and European elections, including: the English Democrats, The British Democratic Party (BDP), and The British National Party (BNP).

The Scottish Socialist Party (SSP) has previously won seats in the Scottish parliament in the 1999 and 2003 Scottish Parliament elections, though lost all of their MSPs in the 2007. Other fringe left wing parties include: the Socialist Labour Party (UK), the Socialist Party of Great Britain, the Communist Party of Britain, the Socialist Party (England and Wales), the Socialist Workers Party, and the Workers Party of Britain.

There are a number of local parties and single issue. The Aspire Party is local to the London Borough of Tower Hamlets and has 33 out of the 45 seats in the Tower Hamlets council and the Mayorship of the bough. Mebyon Kernow in Cornwall and the Yorkshire Party in Yorkshire are also regional parties but don't have any electoral representation.

The UK has also has a number of satirical political parties and candidates.The largest of these is the Official Monster Raving Loony Party (OMRLP) which was founded in 1983 and are distinguished by having a deliberately bizarre manifesto, which contains things that seem to be impossible or too absurd to implement – usually to highlight what they see as real-life absurdities.

=== Membership ===
All political parties have membership schemes that allow members of the public to actively influence the policy and direction of the party to varying degrees, though particularly at a local level. Membership of British political parties is around 1% of the British electorate, which is lower than in all European countries except for Poland and Latvia. Overall membership to a political party has been in decline since the 1950s. In 1951, the Conservative Party had 2.2 million members, and a year later in 1952 the Labour Party reached their peak of 1 million members (of an electorate of around 34 million).

The table below details the membership numbers of political parties that have more than 5,000 members.

Party	Members	Date	Regions served
Reform UK	268,000	December 2025	UK
Labour	<250,000	December 2025	UK
Green Party of England and Wales	220,000	March 2026	England and Wales
Conservatives	123,000	July 2025	UK
Liberal Democrats	60,000	October 2025	UK
Scottish National Party	56,011	August 2025	Scotland
Co-operative Party	13,430	2024	UK
Plaid Cymru	10,000	2022	Wales
Scottish Greens	9000	December 2025	Scotland
Workers Party of Britain	7,469	January 2025	UK

No data could be collected for the four parties of Northern Ireland: the DUP, UUP, SDLP, and Sinn Féin. However, in January 1997, it was estimated that the UUP had 10,000 – 12,000 members, and the DUP had 5,000 members.

== Local government ==
The UK is divided into a complex system of local governance.

== Former European Union membership ==
Until 2020, the United Kingdom was a member of the European Union (EU). This enacted European laws and regulations in the UK, allowing free movement of good through the European Customs Union, and collective trading agreement through the European single market. In addition, British citizens and EU citizens were able to elect members to the European Parliament in Brussels and Strasbourg, between 1979 and 2019.

The United Kingdom first joined the then European Communities in January 1973 by the then Conservative Prime Minister Edward Heath, and remained a member during the transformation into the European Union. Upon the introduction of the euro, the Labour Party is also divided, resulting in the UK not joining the Eurozone. In March 2008, Parliament decided to not hold a referendum on the ratification of the Lisbon Treaty, expanding the power of the EU signed, despite the Labour government promising in 2004 to hold a referendum on the previously proposed Constitution for Europe.

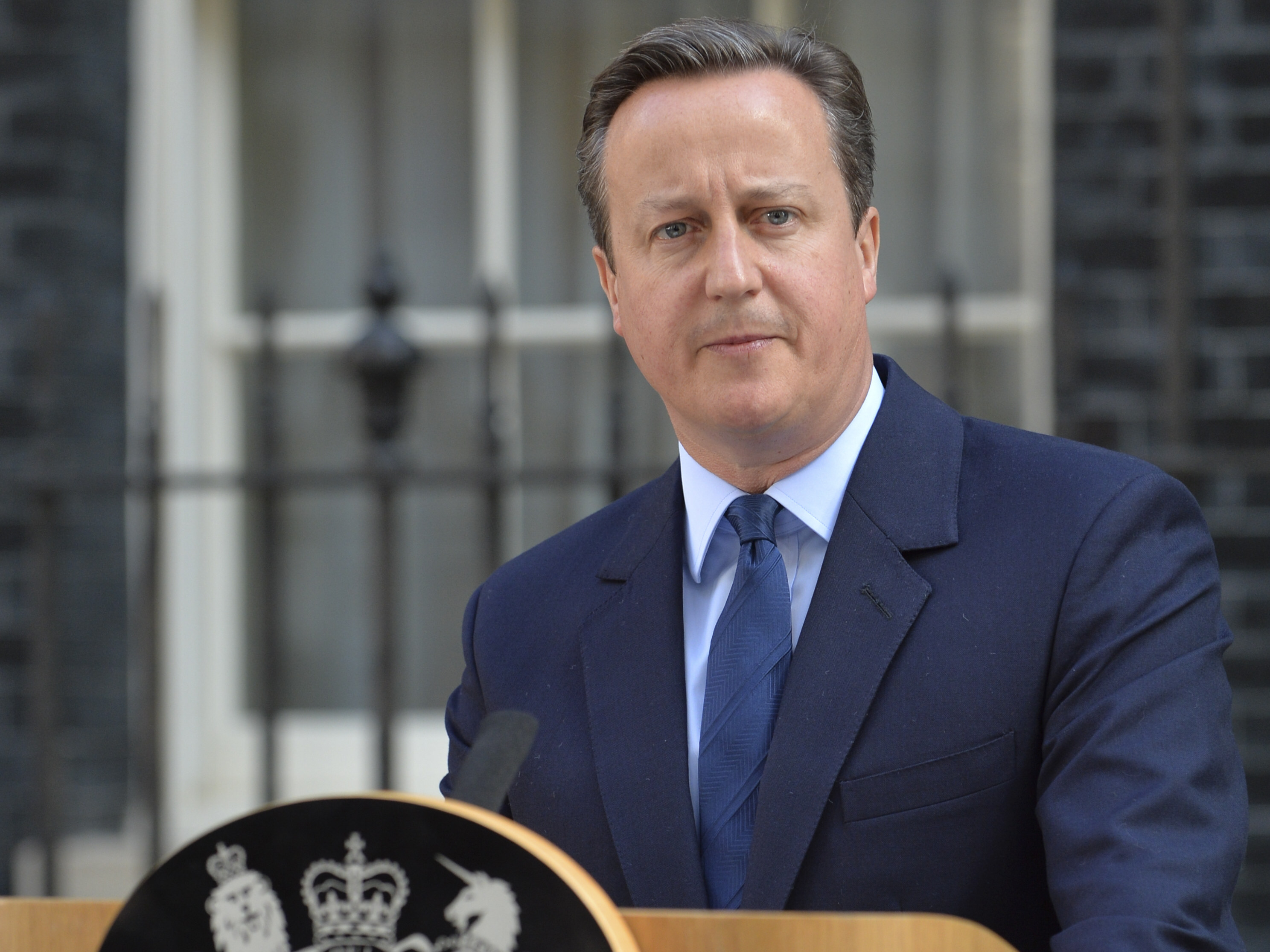
Prime Minister David Cameron, announces his resignation following the 2016 Brexit referendum.

On 23 June 2016, the David Cameron announced a referendum as to whether the UK will stay or leave the EU, following strong results for the UK Independence Party (UKIP) in European Parliament elections, though he affirmed his support for the UK remaining in the EU. Following a result to leave, Cameron resigned as prime minister and successive conservative governments debated to as to how and when this would happen.

Following legal challenges and the passage of the European Union (Notification of Withdrawal) Act 2017, under Conservative prime minister Theresa May, the government triggered Article 50, formerly beginning the process to withdraw from the European Union. At the same time the government also singled its intent to withdraw from the European Atomic Energy Community. The original leave date was 31 October 2019, though this was later delayed.

The UK withdrew from the EU on 31 January 2020, beginning a transition period that was set to end on 31 December 2020. During the 11-month transition period, the UK and EU negotiated their future relationship which resulted in the EU–UK Trade and Cooperation Agreement which was agreed on 24 December 2020 just days before the end of the transition period. The UK ended the transition period which ended the incorporation of European Union law into UK law and membership of the EU Customs Union and European single market.

== International organisation participation ==
- African Development Bank
- Asian Development Bank
- Australia Group
- Bank for International Settlements
- Commonwealth of Nations
- Caribbean Development Bank (non-regional)
- Council of Europe
- CERN
- Euro-Atlantic Partnership Council
- European Bank for Reconstruction and Development
- European Investment Bank
- European Space Agency
- Food and Agriculture Organization
- G5, G6, G7, G8
- G10
- Inmarsat
- Inter-American Development Bank
- International Atomic Energy Agency
- International Bank for Reconstruction and Development
- International Civil Aviation Organization
- International Chamber of Commerce
- International Confederation of Free Trade Unions
- International Criminal Court
- International Criminal Police Organization – Interpol
- International Development Association
- International Energy Agency
- International Federation of Red Cross and Red Crescent Societies
- International Finance Corporation
- International Fund for Agricultural Development
- International Hydrographic Organization
- International Labour Organization
- International Maritime Organization
- International Monetary Fund
- International Olympic Committee (IOC)
- International Organization for Migration (IOM) (observer)
- International Organization for Standardization (ISO)
- International Red Cross and Red Crescent Movement
- International Telecommunications Satellite Organization (Intelsat)
- International Telecommunication Union (ITU)
- International Whaling Commission
- MONUC
- Non-Aligned Movement (NAM) (guest)
- North Atlantic Treaty Organization (NATO)
- Nuclear Energy Agency (NEA)
- Nuclear Suppliers Group (NSG)
- Organisation for Economic Co-operation and Development
- Organisation for the Prohibition of Chemical Weapons
- Organization for Security and Co-operation in Europe (OSCE)
- Organization of American States (OAS) (observer)
- The Pacific Community (SPC)
- Permanent Court of Arbitration
- UNESCO
- United Nations
- United Nations Conference on Trade and Development (UNCTAD)
- United Nations Economic Commission for Africa (associate)
- United Nations Economic Commission for Europe
- United Nations Economic Commission for Latin America and the Caribbean
- United Nations Economic and Social Commission for Asia and the Pacific
- United Nations High Commissioner for Refugees (UNHCR)
- United Nations Industrial Development Organization (UNIDO)
- United Nations Interim Administration Mission in Kosovo (UNMIK)
- United Nations Iraq–Kuwait Observation Mission (UNIKOM)
- United Nations Mission in Bosnia and Herzegovina (UNMIBH)
- United Nations Mission in Sierra Leone (UNAMSIL)
- United Nations Observer Mission in Georgia (UNOMIG)
- United Nations Peacekeeping Force in Cyprus (UNFICYP)
- United Nations Relief and Works Agency for Palestine Refugees in the Near East (UNRWA)
- United Nations Security Council (permanent member)
- Universal Postal Union (UPU)
- UNTAET
- Western European Union
- World Confederation of Labour
- World Customs Organization
- World Health Organization
- World Intellectual Property Organization
- World Meteorological Organization
- World Trade Organization
- Zangger Committee

== Coalitions and Alliances ==
- Lib–Con pact
- Lib–Lab pact
- Liberal Democrat–Green Party alliance

== See also ==
- Politics of England
- Politics of Northern Ireland
- Politics of Scotland
- Politics of Wales
- Anarchism in the United Kingdom
- British left
- Censorship in the United Kingdom
- Conservatism in the United Kingdom
- Corruption in the United Kingdom
- Constitutional reform in the United Kingdom
- Electoral reform
- Electoral registration in the United Kingdom
- Endorsements in the 2024 United Kingdom general election
- Far-left politics in the United Kingdom
- Far-right politics in the United Kingdom
- Islamism in the United Kingdom
- Anti-fascism
- Post–World War II anti-fascism
- Labour Party leadership of Keir Starmer
- Liberalism in the United Kingdom
- Libertarianism in the United Kingdom
- List of British politicians who have acknowledged cannabis use
- List of elected British politicians who have changed party affiliation
- List of political scandals in the United Kingdom
- List of pressure groups in the United Kingdom
- Lobbying in the United Kingdom
- Make Votes Matter
- Parliament in the Making
- Radical Whigs
- Referendums in the United Kingdom
- Reform Acts
- Socialism in the United Kingdom
- United Kingdom common framework policies
