= European Union Bill 2004–2005 =

Bill of the United Kingdom Parliament

Parliament of the United Kingdom
- Long title: To make provision in connection with the Treaty signed at Rome on 29th October 2004 establishing a Constitution for Europe; and to require a referendum to be held about it.
- Citation: Bill 45 2004–05

Legislative history
- Introduced by: Jack Straw
- First reading: 25 January 2005
- Second reading: 9 February 2005
- Third reading: Not read a third time.
- Member(s) in charge: Jack Straw
- First reading: 24 May 2005
- Second reading: Not read a second time.

Summary
- Bill 45 of 2004/05. Bill 5 in 2005/06.
- Status: Withdrawn

The European Union Bill 2004–2005 (Bill 45) was a bill of the United Kingdom Parliament which proposed to ratify the European Constitution and to incorporate it into the domestic law of the United Kingdom and to amend the European Communities Act 1972 to include it in the list of Treaties and hold a referendum throughout the United Kingdom and Gibraltar on whether to approve the proposed Constitution which would be overseen by the Electoral Commission.

The bill was first introduced during the parliamentary session of 2004/2005 and received a second reading. It fell at the end of that parliament. The bill was reintroduced in the new parliament and the 2005/2006 session; however, it was withdrawn after its first reading by Jack Straw on 6 June 2005 following "no" votes in referendums that were held on ratifying the European Constitution in France and in the Netherlands. If the referendum had gone ahead it would have been the first UK-wide referendum to have been held since the 1975 European Communities membership referendum, which at the time had been the only nationwide referendum to be held. No date for the proposed referendum was ever set; however, the expectation was at the time that it would have been held sometime in the first six months of 2006 with the possibility that it could have been held on the same day as the 2006 UK local elections which were scheduled and duly held on 4 May 2006.

== Proposed referendum question ==
The bill gave the question to appear on ballot papers:

Should the United Kingdom approve the Treaty establishing a Constitution for the European Union?

and in Welsh:

A ddylai’r Deyrnas Unedig dderbyn y Cytuniad a fyddai’n sefydlu Cyfansoddiad i’r Undeb Ewropeaidd?

permitting a simple YES/NO answer

== See also ==
- Treaty of Lisbon
- European Union (Amendment) Act 2008
- European Union Act 2011
- European Union Referendum Act 2015
- 2016 United Kingdom European Union membership referendum
