= United Kingdom European Constitution referendum =

Cancelled 2006 referendum

- 2006 (cancelled)
- Should the United Kingdom approve the Treaty establishing a Constitution for the European Union?

A referendum was expected to take place in the United Kingdom in 2006 to decide whether the country should ratify the proposed Treaty establishing a Constitution for Europe. However, following the rejection of the Constitution by similar referendums in France in May 2005 and the Netherlands in June 2005, the UK vote was postponed indefinitely. The question was thought to have been settled when the constitution was superseded by the Treaty of Lisbon, which Parliament ratified in 2008 without holding a referendum.

== Announcement ==
As negotiations finalising the text of the proposed constitution drew to a close in early 2004, Prime Minister, Tony Blair, had consistently denied the need for a referendum on its ratification. However, on 20 April 2004, he announced in the House of Commons that a referendum would in fact be held in due course assuming the treaty was accepted by the European Council.

Initial reaction amongst the opposition was three-fold. Firstly, the Conservatives were pleased as they felt they had forced Tony Blair into a U-turn. For example, Michael Howard, the Leader of the Opposition, said "Who will ever trust you again?" in his response to Blair's statement. In response, opponents of Howard have said that he himself has done a U-turn by asking for a referendum at all. Howard was a member of the Conservative Government that rejected calls for a referendum on the Maastricht Treaty in 1993. This treaty conferred many new competences on the Union, something that the proposed constitution did not do; this led some commentators to argue that it was inconsistent to demand a referendum on the constitutional treaty when one was not held on the Maastricht Treaty.

Secondly, the Conservative Party repeated its opposition to such a constitution which it saw as involving an unacceptable loss of sovereignty (See Controversy over the new constitution).

The Conservatives also wanted to know about the timing of the referendum and the precise wording of its question. Commentators expected that a referendum would not be held until after the 2005 general election. They suggested that the Labour Party would seek to minimise the impact of the issue of Europe on the election campaign by saying "we can discuss that at the referendum".

Supporters of the Government said that a referendum could only be held after sufficient parliamentary time had been devoted to analysing the text, thus forcing a delay until after the election. The Conservatives rejected this, saying that sufficient scrutiny could be given, and a referendum held, in the autumn and winter of 2004.

The Conservatives also suggested that if the Treaty were rejected, the Blair government would repeat the referendum until it got its desired result. In the days after the announcement of the vote, government policy was not immediately clear on this issue: it initially said that the UK would then be in the same position as Ireland was after it rejected the Nice treaty. Ireland subsequently adopted that treaty after a second referendum, suggesting that Britain might attempt to do the same. Denmark also held two referendums before accepting the Maastricht Treaty.

However, at his usual monthly news conference on 22 April, Blair said: "If the British people vote 'no', they vote 'no'. You can't keep bringing it back until they vote 'yes'." BBC Radio 4 and The Times subsequently reported some back-tracking on this issue from "Number 10" (presumably the press office).

== Proposed referendum question ==
The proposed referendum question was included in Part 3 of the European Union Bill 2004–2005. The question to appear on ballot papers would have been as follows:

Should the United Kingdom approve the Treaty establishing a Constitution for the European Union?

and in Welsh:

A ddylai’r Deyrnas Unedig dderbyn y Cytuniad a fyddai’n sefydlu Cyfansoddiad i’r Undeb Ewropeaidd?

permitting a simple YES/NO answer

== Preparations ==
Following the agreement of the final constitution draft, Blair announced his full support for it, claiming that it protected the national veto on sensitive issues such as tax, social policy, defence and foreign policy.

On 29 October 2004, the Foreign Secretary Jack Straw ruled out holding a referendum in 2005 as this would have coincided with the UK holding the rotating presidency of the Council of the European Union. He said that the referendum would be held in early 2006, providing Labour were re-elected in the 2005 general election.

A bill authorising the referendum was announced in the Queen's Speech of 23 November 2004 and was introduced to Parliament in January 2005 as the European Union Bill 2005.

On 26 January 2005 the government announced that the question asked in the referendum would be: "Should the United Kingdom approve the treaty establishing a constitution for the European Union?" Theresa May, Shadow Secretary of State for the Family, described the question as "fair".

=== Electoral Commission rules ===
The rules governing how British referendums are held were determined by the Electoral Commission. The commission was to judge whether the question asked was clear and unbiased and make recommendations, but Parliament would make the final decision. Caps were also placed on the amount that can be spent by each side of the debate with two "designated organisations", one for each side of the debate, would be able to spend at most £5m campaigning, of which up to £600,000 could come from public funds, and would also be entitled to free broadcasts and mail shots. All other interested parties would be able to spend at most £500,000 and would have to be registered with the Commission if they receive any single donation in excess of £10,000. Furthermore, the Government was permitted to publish information publicising its view, with no spending limit, until 28 days compared to 70 days for all other participants.

== Opinion polls ==
Every opinion poll on how people would vote in a referendum pointed to a "no" vote.

ICM asked 1,000 voters in the third week of May 2005: "If there were a referendum tomorrow, would you vote for Britain to sign up to the European Constitution or not?”: 57% said no, 24% said yes, and 19% said that they did not know.

== Cancellation ==
Following the French and Dutch rejection of the treaty, Jack Straw announced on 6 June 2005, to the House of Commons, that the plans for the referendum in early 2006 had been shelved.

The matter became one of only hypothetical interest following the replacement of the proposed constitution with the agreement of the text of the Treaty of Lisbon on 19 October 2007.

== See also ==
- Referendums in the United Kingdom
