= Stoke-on-Trent City Council elections =

Local government elections in Staffordshire, England

Stoke-on-Trent City Council elections are held every four years. Stoke-on-Trent City Council is the local authority for the unitary authority of Stoke-on-Trent in the ceremonial county of Staffordshire, England. Since the last boundary changes in 2023, 44 councillors have been elected from 34 wards.

== Council elections ==
- 1973 Stoke-on-Trent City Council election
- 1976 Stoke-on-Trent City Council election
- 1979 Stoke-on-Trent City Council election (New ward boundaries)
- 1980 Stoke-on-Trent City Council election
- 1982 Stoke-on-Trent City Council election
- 1983 Stoke-on-Trent City Council election
- 1984 Stoke-on-Trent City Council election
- 1986 Stoke-on-Trent City Council election
- 1987 Stoke-on-Trent City Council election
- 1988 Stoke-on-Trent City Council election
- 1990 Stoke-on-Trent City Council election
- 1991 Stoke-on-Trent City Council election
- 1992 Stoke-on-Trent City Council election
- 1994 Stoke-on-Trent City Council election
- 1995 Stoke-on-Trent City Council election
- 1996 Stoke-on-Trent City Council election
- 1998 Stoke-on-Trent City Council election
- 1999 Stoke-on-Trent City Council election
- 2000 Stoke-on-Trent City Council election
- 2002 Stoke-on-Trent City Council election (New ward boundaries)
- 2003 Stoke-on-Trent City Council election
- 2004 Stoke-on-Trent City Council election
- 2006 Stoke-on-Trent City Council election
- 2007 Stoke-on-Trent City Council election
- 2008 Stoke-on-Trent City Council election
- 2010 Stoke-on-Trent City Council election
- 2011 Stoke-on-Trent City Council election (New ward boundaries)
- 2015 Stoke-on-Trent City Council election
- 2019 Stoke-on-Trent City Council election
- 2023 Stoke-on-Trent City Council election (New ward boundaries)

== Results maps ==
2002 results map

2003 results map

2004 results map

2006 results map

2007 results map

2008 results map

2010 results map

2011 results map

2015 results map

2019 results map

2023 results map

== Mayoral elections ==
- Stoke-on-Trent mayoral election, 2002
- Stoke-on-Trent mayoral election, 2005

== By-election results ==
=== 2002-2006 ===
Abbey Green by-election, 18 September 2003
Party	Candidate	Votes	%	±%
Labour	Paul Sutton	842	34.2	−2.8
BNP	John West	782	31.8	+31.8
Independent	Donald McLean	374	15.2	+15.2
Conservative	Shaun Bennett	249	10.1	−3.0
Liberal Democrats	Maxine Morrow	154	6.3	+6.3
Socialist	Dave Frost	61	2.5	+2.5
Majority		60		
Turnout		2,462		
Labour gain from Independent		Swing		

Burslem South by-election, 22 July 2004
Party	Candidate	Votes	%	±%
Independent	Edward Owen	657	37.2	+20.3
Labour	Terence Crowe	432	24.5	−10.7
Independent	Mohammed Ayub	261	14.8	+14.8
BNP	Michael Coleman	162	9.2	+9.2
Independent	Michael Farrington	109	6.2	+6.2
Conservative	Donald Smith	92	5.2	−1.3
Liberal Democrats	George Salmon	51	2.9	−4.6
Majority		225	12.8	
Turnout		1,764		
Independent gain from Labour		Swing		

East Valley by-election, 3 March 2005
Party	Candidate	Votes	%	±%
Liberal Democrats	Geoff Knight	525	25.2	+12.8
Labour	Richard Hughes	496	23.8	−7.1
BNP	Spencer Cartlidge	465	22.3	−3.0
Independent	Harold Churchill	445	21.4	+21.4
Conservative	Darren Lovatt	150	7.2	−8.1
Majority		29	1.4	
Turnout		2,081		
Liberal Democrats gain from Labour		Swing		

=== 2011-2015 ===
Springfields & Trent Vale Ward by-election, 26 July 2012
Party	Candidate	Votes	%	±%
City Independents	Jackie Barnes	370	34.90	N/A
Labour	Mubsira Aumir	245	23.11	
Liberal Democrats	Les Porch	152	14.33	
Conservative	Harold David Gregory	109	10.28	N/A
UKIP	Michael Anthony Bedarsky	105	9.90	
Independent	Gary Elsby	36	3.39	N/A
BNP	Michael Coleman	27	2.54	N/A
TUSC	Matt Wright	14	1.32	N/A
Democratic Nationalist Party	Mark Leat	2	0.18	N/A
Majority		125		
Turnout		1,060	21.6	
City Independents gain from Labour		Swing		

Baddeley, Milton and Norton Ward by-election, 14 November 2013
Party	Candidate	Votes	%	±%
City Independents	Anthony Munday	861	32.19	
Conservative	Sam Richardson	504	18.84	
Labour	Candi Chetwynd	444	16.60	
UKIP	Mick Harold	333	12.45	
Independent	Gary Elsby	313	11.70	
BNP	Michael Anthony White	79	2.95	
Green	Adam William Colclough	50	1.86	
Liberal Democrats	Tom Grocock	32	1.19	
Independent	John Davis	27	1.00	
TUSC	Liat James Norris	25	0.93	
Majority		357	13.35	
Turnout		2,674	19.18	
City Independents gain from Labour		Swing		

=== 2019-2023 ===
Moorcroft by-election, 6 May 2021
Party	Candidate	Votes	%	±%
Conservative	Tariq Mahmood	769	49.16	+9.56
Labour	Javid Iqbal Najmi	702	44.88	−15.52
TUSC	Andy Butcher	77	4.92	+4.92
Majority		67	4.28	
Rejected ballots		16	1.0	
Turnout		1,564	39.39	
Conservative gain from Labour				

Penkhull and Stoke by-election, 1 July 2021
Party	Candidate	Votes	%	±%
Conservative	Dean Richardson	582	40.6	+34.1
Labour	Lee Polshaw	572	39.9	−0.7
City Independents	Hazel Lyth	171	11.9	−32.6
Green	Adam Colclough	109	7.6	−0.8
Majority		10	0.7	
Turnout		1,434		
Conservative gain from City Independents		Swing		

Bentilee and Ubberley by-election, 22 September 2022
Party	Candidate	Votes	%	±%
Labour	Lynn Watkins	469	62.5	+29.8
City Independents	Sharon Edwards	143	19.1	−3.0
Conservative	Matthew Bridger	138	18.4	+9.5
Majority		326	43.5	
Turnout		750		
Labour hold		Swing		

=== 2023-2027 ===
Meir North by-election, 2 May 2024
Party	Candidate	Votes	%	±%
Labour	Lauren Davison	469	53.9	+1.6
Independent	Michelle Swift	216	24.8	−5.3
Conservative	Khawar Ali	185	21.3	+3.6
Majority		253	29.1	
Turnout		870		
Labour hold		Swing		

Michelle Swift ran as a City Independents candidate in 2023.

Birches Head and Northwood by-election, 15 May 2025
Party	Candidate	Votes	%	±%
Reform	Luke Shenton	1,226	58.5	
Labour	Maggie Bradley	449	21.4	
City Independents	Jean Bowers	346	16.5	
Conservative	Khawar Ali	73	3.5	
Majority		777	37.1	
Turnout		2,094		
Reform gain from Labour		Swing		
