= 2008 Stoke-on-Trent City Council election =

2008 UK local government election

Results by ward.

The 2008 Stoke-on-Trent City Council election for the Stoke-on-Trent City Council took place on 1 May 2008. One third of the council was up for election.

== Election result ==
Stoke-on-Trent Council Election Result 2008
Party	Seats	Gains	Losses	Net gain/loss	Seats %	Votes %	Votes	+/−
Labour	4	2	12	-10		25.1	14,038	
Conservative	2	2	1	+1		17.4	9,740	
Independent	4	3	2	+1		17.2	9,657	
BNP	3	3	1	+2		14.3	7,986	
City Independents	5	5	-	+5		12.8	7,186	
Liberal Democrats	2	2	1	+1		8.4	4,700	
Potteries Alliance	0					4.3	2,387	
Green	0					0.3	164	
Socialist Alternative	0					0.2	130	
Turnout						30.2	55,988	

== Ward results ==
Abbey Green
Party	Candidate	Votes	%	±%
BNP	Melanie Jane Baddeley	858	31.0	
Labour	Gary Elsby	784	28.3	
Conservative	Andrew John Wragg	721	26.0	
Independent	Paul Sutton	244	8.8	
Green	Barry Malpass	164	5.9	
Majority		74	2.7	
Turnout		2,771	30.9	
BNP gain from Labour		Swing		

Bentilee and Townsend
Party	Candidate	Votes	%	±%
BNP	Steven Reginald Batkin	829	34.6	
Labour	Mervin Thomas Smith	620	25.9	
Independent	Wendy Caroline Johnson	320	13.4	
Conservative	Christine Warren	273	11.4	
Potteries Alliance	Maurice Lewis	177	7.4	
Liberal Democrats	Susan Ford	174	7.3	
Majority		209	8.7	
Turnout		2,393	26.4	
BNP gain from Labour		Swing		

Berryhill and Hanley East
Party	Candidate	Votes	%	±%
City Independents	John Gilbert Davis	729	34.7	
Labour	Terence Frederick Crowe	654	31.1	
Conservative	Richard John William Ibbs	434	20.6	
Liberal Democrats	John Phillip Redfern	286	13.6	
Majority		75	3.6	
Turnout		2,103	27.1	
City Independents gain from Labour		Swing		

Blurton
Party	Candidate	Votes	%	±%
City Independents	Roy Stanley Naylor	1,152	44.0	
Labour	Michael Tappin	776	29.6	
Conservative	Harold Malcolm Mouat	469	17.9	
Liberal Democrats	Peter George Chambers	222	8.5	
Majority		376	14.3	
Turnout		2,619	27.7	
City Independents gain from Labour		Swing		

Burslem North
Party	Candidate	Votes	%	±%
Labour	David Conway	1,104	46.7	
Potteries Alliance	Malcolm Barber	513	21.7	
Conservative	Donald Winston Smith	493	20.8	
Liberal Democrats	Sabrina Ann Bowers	255	10.8	
Majority		591	25.0	
Turnout		2,365	26.2	
Labour hold		Swing		

Burslem South
Party	Candidate	Votes	%	±%
Labour	Javid Iqbal Najmi	968	39.3	
Potteries Alliance	Ted Owen	688	27.9	
Conservative	Gareth Fallows	349	14.2	
Independent	David Giltrap	189	7.7	
Liberal Democrats	Diane Thomas	141	5.7	
Socialist Alternative	Jane Mellalieu	130	5.3	
Majority		280	11.4	
Turnout		2,465	27.9	
Labour gain from Independent		Swing		

Chell and Packmoor
Party	Candidate	Votes	%	±%
City Independents	Janine Taylor	912	35.4	
Independent	Angela Miller	579	22.5	
BNP	Craig Arthur Pond	566	22.0	
Labour	David Eric Roberts	416	16.1	
Independent	Sylvia Emily Nagington	103	4.0	
Majority		333	12.9	
Turnout		2,576	27.9	
City Independents gain from Independent		Swing		

East Valley
Party	Candidate	Votes	%	±%
Conservative	Joanne Clare Powell-Beckett	1,146	43.8	
Labour	Sybil Halfpenny	713	27.3	
Potteries Alliance	Christine Knight	509	19.5	
City Independents	Jackie Ward	247	9.4	
Majority		433	16.6	
Turnout		2,615	26.3	
Conservative gain from Labour		Swing		

Fenton
Party	Candidate	Votes	%	±%
City Independents	Mick Bell	1,150	39.3	
BNP	Samuel Richard Tunstall	779	26.6	
Labour	Stan Bate	578	19.7	
Conservative	Steven John Morris	292	10.0	
Liberal Democrats	Thomas Harry Grocock	129	4.4	
Majority		371	12.7	
Turnout		2,928	31.7	
City Independents gain from Labour		Swing		

Hanley West and Shelton
Party	Candidate	Votes	%	±%
Liberal Democrats	Zulfiqar Ali	977	49.5	
Labour	Marj Bate	743	37.6	
Independent	Jim Piper	217	11.0	
Independent	Marek Goslicki	37	1.9	
Majority		234	11.9	
Turnout		1,974	23.9	
Liberal Democrats gain from Labour		Swing		

Hartshill and Penkhull
Party	Candidate	Votes	%	±%
Independent	Randy Conteh	1,263	46.4	
Conservative	Stephen Andrew Brown	543	20.0	
Liberal Democrats	Jonathan Taylor	499	18.3	
Labour	Adam William Colclough	415	15.3	
Majority		720	26.5	
Turnout		2,720	30.5	
Independent hold		Swing		

Longton North
Party	Candidate	Votes	%	±%
Labour	Thomas Anthony William Reynolds	1,005	30.7	
BNP	Pauline Smith	844	25.8	
Independent	Mark Leat	578	17.7	
Conservative	Alexander Hayward	550	16.8	
Independent	Roy Bennett	292	8.9	
Majority		239	7.3	
Turnout		3,269	30.9	
Labour gain from BNP		Swing		

Longton South
Party	Candidate	Votes	%	±%
Labour	Bagh Ali	1,633	42.0	
Conservative	James Whitehurst	797	20.5	
BNP	Lynne Pond	756	19.4	
Liberal Democrats	Geoffrey Harold Jenkinson	569	14.6	
Independent	Rob Kettle	132	3.4	
Majority		836	21.5	
Turnout		3,887	26.4	
Labour hold		Swing		

Meir Park and Sandon
Party	Candidate	Votes	%	±%
BNP	John William Burgess	979	30.3	
City Independents	Christine Follows	909	28.1	
Conservative	Abigail Margaret Brown	774	23.9	
Labour	Kath Banks	570	17.6	
Majority		70	2.2	
Turnout		3,232	32.4	
BNP gain from Conservative		Swing		

Northwood and Birches
Party	Candidate	Votes	%	±%
Liberal Democrats	Dave Sutton	624	22.9	
Independent	Eve Mary Maley	623	22.9	
BNP	Stanley Leese	594	21.8	
Potteries Alliance	Reginald Booth	500	18.4	
Labour	Barry George Stockley	379	13.9	
Majority		1	0.0	
Turnout		2,720	29.8	
Liberal Democrats gain from Labour		Swing		

Norton and Bradeley
Party	Candidate	Votes	%	±%
Independent	Mick Salih	1,225	44.4	
Independent	Robert Douglas Hooper	1,148	41.7	
Labour	Richard Anthony Blake	383	13.9	
Majority		77	2.8	
Turnout		2,756	31.3	
Independent gain from Labour		Swing		

Stoke and Trent Vale
Party	Candidate	Votes	%	±%
Independent	Pauline Joynson	824	32.2	
Liberal Democrats	Conrad Lubinski	590	23.1	
Conservative	Harold David Gregory	424	16.6	
Labour	Margaret Lilley	376	14.7	
Independent	Monica Mitchell	298	11.7	
Independent	Spencer Mervyn Cartlidge	45	1.8	
Majority		234	9.2	
Turnout		2,557	26.8	
Independent gain from Liberal Democrats		Swing		

Trentham and Hanford
Party	Candidate	Votes	%	±%
City Independents	Terry Follows	2,087	56.2	
Conservative	Shaun Lee Bennett	1,104	29.7	
Labour	Alistair Scott Watson	288	7.8	
Liberal Democrats	Christine Grocock	234	6.3	
Majority		983	26.5	
Turnout		3,713	38.1	
City Independents gain from Conservative		Swing		

Tunstall
Party	Candidate	Votes	%	±%
Independent	Megan Ryan	1,143	36.9	
BNP	Terence Francis Cope	813	26.3	
Labour	Shiela Grace Pitt	703	22.7	
Conservative	Stewart Bertram Jones	327	10.6	
Independent	Albert Edwin Hurst	110	3.6	
Majority		330	10.7	
Turnout		3,096	31.4	
Independent gain from Labour		Swing		

Weston and Meir North
Party	Candidate	Votes	%	±%
Conservative	John Clement Daniels	1,044	32.3	
BNP	Anthony Steven Tabbinor	968	30.0	
Labour	Ian Philip McLaughlan	930	28.8	
Independent	Gordon Perry	287	8.9	
Majority		76	2.4	
Turnout		3,229	35.2	
Conservative gain from Labour		Swing		
