= 2011 Stoke-on-Trent City Council election =

2011 UK local government election

Results by ward

Elections to Stoke-on-Trent City Council took place on 5 May 2011. This election was the first following an Electoral Review by the Local Government Boundary Commission for England. The total number of councillors became 44 (down from 60) in a mixture of single and multi-member wards (31 single member wards, 5 two member wards and 1 three member ward). The former election by thirds (i.e., one third of councillors up for election in each of three years out of a four-year cycle) was replaced by whole council election every fourth year.

== Election result ==
After the election, the parties were represented thus: Labour 34 seats; Conservative 2 seats; Others (independents and "unaffiliated") 8 seats. After several years as a minority party, Labour had acquired a dominant majority of seats. A notable feature of this result was the elimination of Liberal Democrat representation and that of various right-wing populist and far-right parties. The second largest political "grouping" is of Independent councillors.

Stoke-on-Trent Council Election Result 2011
Party	Seats	Gains	Losses	Net gain/loss	Seats %	Votes %	Votes	+/−
Labour	34	-	-	+8		41.15	29,691	
Independent	8			-9		20.62	14,880	
Conservative	2			-6		15.84	11,429	
Liberal Democrats	0			-4		8.99	6,489	
Community Voice	0					5.00	3,607	
BNP	0			-5		3.50	2,528	
UKIP	0					2.61	1,882	
England First	0					1.05	760	
TUSC	0					0.67	486	
English Democrat	0					0.56	402	
Turnout								

The net change column is a comparison with the preceding council, which was 16 members larger. It was, therefore, possible for every party or group to have lost seats. Shares of the votes are based upon accepted votes cast (in multi-member wards, an elector is not obliged to use all votes to which they are entitled).

== Ward results ==
Elected candidates are in bold. Previously sitting councillors (on the old 60 member council) marked by "*".

Abbey Hulton and Townsend (2 seats)
Party	Candidate	Votes	%	±%
Labour	**Gwenyth Hassall***	1092	31.27	
Labour	**Adrian Knapper***	900	25.77	
BNP	Melanie Baddeley*	483	13.83	
Community Voice	Elaine Walker*	416	11.91	
Liberal Democrats	Margery Graham	258	7.39	
Liberal Democrats	Dugald Connell	216	6.19	
TUSC	Neil Singh	127	3.64	
Majority		417	11.94	
Turnout		3492	28.01	
Labour **hold**		Swing		
Labour **hold**		Swing		

Baddeley, Milton and Norton (3 seats)
Party	Candidate	Votes	%	±%
Conservative	**Jack Brereton**	1305	11.33	
Labour	**Andrew Lilley**	1247	10.83	
Labour	**Duncan Walker***	1174	10.19	
Community Voice	Michael Salih*	1124	9.76	
Conservative	Joanne Powell-Beckett*	1120	9.72	
Labour	Israel Amponsah	960	8.33	
Conservative	Hazel Lyth*	895	7.77	
Independent	Alan Rigby*	830	7.21	
Independent	Gary Elsby	800	6.95	
BNP	Michael White	439	3.81	
UKIP	Andrew Smith	410	3.56	
Independent	Alexandrina Knight	395	3.43	
English Democrat	Leslie Simpson	253	2.20	
Liberal Democrats	Anne Chadwick	235	2.04	
Liberal Democrats	Susan Ford	231	2.01	
Liberal Democrats	Mohammed Nadeem Ali	100	0.87	
Majority		50	0.43	
Turnout		11,518	33.82	
Conservative **hold**		Swing		
Labour **hold**		Swing		
Labour **hold**		Swing		

Bentilee and Ubberley (2)
Party	Candidate	Votes	%	±%
Labour	**Sheila Pitt**	849	29.22	
Labour	**Alison Wedgwood**	596	20.51	
BNP	Steven Batkin*	429	14.76	
Independent	Rita Dale*	404	13.90	
Independent	John Davis*	330	11.36	
Community Voice	Margaret Lowe	231	7.95	
Liberal Democrats	Sajid Hussain	67	2.31	
Majority		167	5.75	
Turnout		2906	22.25	
Labour **hold**		Swing		
Labour **hold**		Swing		

Birches Head and Central Forest Park (2 seats)
Party	Candidate	Votes	%	±%
Labour	**Mark Meredith**	1145	25.92	
Independent	**Paul Breeze**	915	20.72	
Labour	Javid Najmi*	754	17.07	
Liberal Democrats	Kieran Clarke*	479	10.84	
Conservative	Richard Brereton	339	7.67	
Liberal Democrats	Daniel Cunningham	311	7.04	
Conservative	Stephen Bradbury	299	6.77	
TUSC	Claire Vodrey	175	3.96	
Majority		161	3.65	
Turnout		4417	29.76	
Independent **hold**		Swing		
Labour **hold**		Swing		

Blurton East
Party	Candidate	Votes	%	±%
Independent	**Glenys Ward**	496	33.56	
Conservative	Christine Warren	483	32.68	
Labour	Mubsira Aumir	454	30.72	
Liberal Democrats	Tasneem Kausar	45	3.04	
Majority		13	0.88	
Turnout		1478	35.32	
Independent **hold**		Swing		

Blurton West and Newstead
Party	Candidate	Votes	%	±%
Labour	**Neil Day**	499	45.82	
Independent	Brian Ward*	331	30.39	
Conservative	Harold Mouat	124	11.39	
Independent	Georgina Hulse	104	9.55	
Liberal Democrats	Tariq Mahmood	31	2.85	
Majority		168	15.43	
Turnout		1089	25.54	
Labour **hold**		Swing		

Boothen and Oak Hill
Party	Candidate	Votes	%	±%
Labour	**Andrew Platt**	525	42.58	
Liberal Democrats	Thomas Grocock	349	28.30	
UKIP	Dean Emery	142	11.52	
Community Voice	Karen Eardley	124	10.06	
BNP	Stephen Issard	93	7.54	
Majority		176	14.27	
Turnout		1233	28.63	
Labour **hold**		Swing		

Bradeley and Chell Heath
Party	Candidate	Votes	%	±%
Labour	**Gurmett Singh Kallar**	443	41.95	
Community Voice	Peter Kent-Baguley*	238	22.54	
Independent	Angela Miller	156	14.77	
England First	Lynne Pond	133	12.59	
Liberal Democrats	Brian Wilson	86	8.14	
Majority		205	19.41	
Turnout		1056	26.13	
Labour **hold**		Swing		

Broadway and Longton East
Party	Candidate	Votes	%	±%
Labour	**Thomas Reynolds***	660	51.64	
Independent	Anthony Simmonds	395	30.91	
English Democrat	Nicholas McVeigh	149	11.66	
Liberal Democrats	Mazhar Hussain	74	5.79	
Majority		265	20.74	
Turnout		1278	31.16	
Labour **hold**		Swing		

Burslem Central
Party	Candidate	Votes	%	±%
Labour	**Alan Dutton**	447	47.45	
Independent	Edward Owen	291	30.89	
Independent	Stephen Ball	119	12.63	
Liberal Democrats	Diane Thomas	54	5.73	
TUSC	Jane Mellalieu	31	3.29	
Majority		156	16.56	
Turnout		942	21.47	
Labour **hold**		Swing		

Burslem Park
Party	Candidate	Votes	%	±%
Labour	**Joy Garner***	600	49.71	
Independent	Robert Conway	357	29.58	
Independent	David Chatton	171	14.17	
Liberal Democrats	Safina Noman	79	6.55	
Majority		243	20.13	
Turnout		1207	30.56	
Labour **hold**		Swing		

Dresden and Florence
Party	Candidate	Votes	%	±%
Labour	**Shazad Hussain**	515	34.84	
Community Voice	Michael Barnes*	406	27.47	
Conservative	Mohammed Shafiq	344	23.27	
England First	Spencer Cartlidge	90	6.09	
Liberal Democrats	Robert Gore	89	6.02	
TUSC	Matthew Wright	34	2.30	
Majority		109	7.37	
Turnout		1478	38.50	
Labour **hold**		Swing		

Eaton Park
Party	Candidate	Votes	%	±%
Labour	**Terrence Crowe**	517	44.19	
Independent	Denise Maddison	309	26.41	
Conservative	David Jones	295	25.21	
Liberal Democrats	Deborah Wilson	49	4.19	
Majority		208	17.78	
Turnout		1170	30.97	
Labour **hold**		Swing		

Etruria and Hanley
Party	Candidate	Votes	%	±%
Labour	**Majid Khan***	464	30.27	
Independent	Mohammad Iqbal*	353	23.03	
UKIP	Lee Fallows	306	19.96	
Liberal Democrats	Gulzar Ahmed	265	17.29	
Community Voice	Amir Khan	145	9.46	
Majority		111	7.24	
Turnout		1533	34.77	
Labour **hold**		Swing		

Fenton East
Party	Candidate	Votes	%	±%
Labour	**Paul Shotton***	628	51.18	
Independent	Ian Mitchell	528	43.03	
Liberal Democrats	Zahra Asim	71	5.79	
Majority		100	8.15	
Turnout		1227	27.25	
Labour **hold**		Swing		

Fenton West and Mount Pleasant
Party	Candidate	Votes	%	±%
Labour	**Karen Clarke**	577	39.31	
Independent	Michael Bell*	574	39.10	
Liberal Democrats	Stephen Blakemore	98	6.68	
UKIP	Peter Atkinson	95	6.47	
BNP	Paula Roberts	94	6.40	
Independent	Joseph Hemmings	30	2.04	
Majority		3	0.20	
Turnout		1468	31.84	
Labour **hold**		Swing		

Ford Green and Smallthorne
Party	Candidate	Votes	%	±%
Labour	**Matthew Wilcox***	600	50.38	
Community Voice	John Nicholls	209	17.55	
Independent	Sheila Matthews	134	11.25	
BNP	Andrew Jones	100	8.40	
Liberal Democrats	James Borg	86	7.22	
Independent	Ian Norris	62	5.21	
Majority		391	32.83	
Turnout		1191	26.79	
Labour **hold**		Swing		

Goldenhill and Sandyford
Party	Candidate	Votes	%	±%
Labour	**Martin Garner**	436	41.25	
Independent	Laura Ryan*	337	31.88	
England First	Craig Pond	101	9.56	
Independent	Charles Sutton*	97	9.18	
Liberal Democrats	Matthew Wyman	86	8.14	
Majority		99	9.37	
Turnout		1057	25.21	
Labour **hold**		Swing		

Great Chell and Packmoor (2 seats)
Party	Candidate	Votes	%	±%
Labour	**Janine Bridges***	973	24.43	
Independent	**Ann James**	882	22.15	
Labour	Anthony Fradley*	804	20.19	
Independent	Lesley Adams	471	11.83	
Independent	Stephen Parry	415	10.42	
BNP	David Leese	274	6.88	
Liberal Democrats	John Redfern	98	2.46	
Liberal Democrats	Leslie Porch	65	1.63	
Majority		78	1.96	
Turnout		3982	31.17	
Labour **hold**		Swing		
Independent **hold**		Swing		

Hanford and Trentham (2 seats)
Party	Candidate	Votes	%	±%
Independent	**Terence Follows***	1456	19.83	
Independent	**Peter Hayward**	1345	18.32	
Conservative	Mark Wright*	1284	17.49	
Conservative	Ross Irving*	891	12.14	
Labour	Benjamin Dyer	752	10.24	
Labour	Derrick Hesom	588	8.01	
UKIP	Michael Harold	300	4.09	
Liberal Democrats	Alan Alcock	228	3.11	
Liberal Democrats	Christine Grocock	178	2.42	
UKIP	Terence Lancashire	174	2.37	
BNP	Philip Sandland	146	1.99	
Majority		61	0.83	
Turnout		7342	40.30	
Independent **hold**		Swing		
Independent **hold**		Swing		

Hanley Park and Shelton
Party	Candidate	Votes	%	±%
Labour	**Mohammad Wazir***	598	54.56	
Liberal Democrats	Asim Shaheen	300	27.37	
Conservative	Jonathon Taylor	145	13.23	
TUSC	Liat Norris	53	4.84	
Majority		298	27.19	
Turnout		1096	21.77	
Labour **hold**		Swing		

Hartshill and Basford
Party	Candidate	Votes	%	±%
Labour	**Shaun Pender**	558	37.63	
Independent	Barbara Andrew	474	31.96	
Conservative	Pamela Jellyman	297	20.03	
Liberal Democrats	Anita Gill	154	10.38	
Majority		84	5.66	
Turnout		1483	32.03	
Labour **hold**		Swing		

Hollybush and Longton West
Party	Candidate	Votes	%	±%
Labour	**Kathleen Banks**	651	48.95	
Independent	Shaun Bennett	387	29.10	
Conservative	Laura Bloor	223	16.77	
Liberal Democrats	Conrad Lubinski	69	5.19	
Majority		264	19.84	
Turnout		1330	29.78	
Labour **hold**		Swing		

Joiner's Square
Party	Candidate	Votes	%	±%
Labour	**Alastair Watson**	663	61.73	
Community Voice	Marjorie Bate	243	22.63	
Liberal Democrats	Muhammad Yasir	168	15.64	
Majority		420	39.11	
Turnout		1074	29.45	
Labour **hold**		Swing		

Lightwood North and Normacot
Party	Candidate	Votes	%	±%
Labour	**Bagh Ali***	888	44.29	
Liberal Democrats	Sadaqat Maqsoom	795	39.65	
Conservative	Daniel Harley	322	16.06	
Majority		93	4.64	
Turnout		2005	49.10	
Labour **hold**		Swing		

Little Chell and Stanfield
Party	Candidate	Votes	%	±%
Independent	**David Conway***	652	46.34	
Labour	Melanie Clark	637	45.27	
Liberal Democrats	Peter Nicholls	118	8.39	
Majority		15	1.07	
Turnout		1407	31.74	
Independent **hold**		Swing		

Meir Hay
Party	Candidate	Votes	%	±%
Labour	**Muhammad Aumir**	480	40.23	
Conservative	Ross Ward	423	35.46	
England First	John Barnett	197	16.51	
Liberal Democrats	David Elias	93	7.80	
Majority		57	4.78	
Turnout		1193	29.59	
Labour **hold**		Swing		

Meir North
Party	Candidate	Votes	%	±%
Labour	**Ruth Rosenau***	556	45.17	
BNP	Michael Coleman*	299	24.29	
Conservative	Eleanor Bloor	277	22.50	
TUSC	Andrew Bentley	66	5.36	
Liberal Democrats	Matthew Tyrer	33	2.68	
Majority		257	20.88	
Turnout		1231	29.04	
Labour **hold**		Swing		

Meir Park
Party	Candidate	Votes	%	±%
Conservative	**Abigail Brown***	737	46.85	
Labour	Frederick Ball	509	32.36	
Community Voice	Neil Walker	144	9.15	
Liberal Democrats	Brian Whittaker	102	6.48	
UKIP	Colin Rushton	81	5.15	
Majority		228	14.49	
Turnout		1573	40.22	
Conservative **hold**		Swing		

Meir South
Party	Candidate	Votes	%	±%
Labour	**Deborah Wheeldon**	552	50.00	
Conservative	Stephen Brown	228	20.65	
BNP	John Burgess*	171	15.49	
Independent	Warren Lloyd	64	5.80	
Independent	Jacqueline Pearson	52	4.71	
Liberal Democrats	Sabrina Bowers	37	3.35	
Majority		324	29.35	
Turnout		1104	28.06	
Labour **hold**		Swing		

Moorcroft
Party	Candidate	Votes	%	±%
Labour	**Mohammed Pervez***	1066	72.62	
Conservative	Donald Smith	200	13.62	
Independent	Roger Ibbs	149	10.15	
Liberal Democrats	Elliott Devaney	53	3.61	
Majority		866	58.99	
Turnout		1468	37.09	
Labour **hold**		Swing		

Penkhull and Stoke
Party	Candidate	Votes	%	±%
Independent	**Randy Conteh***	727	41.59	
Labour	Jeremy Dillon*	567	32.44	
Conservative	Nicholas Jellyman	156	8.92	
Liberal Democrats	Karlton Rowley	128	7.32	
UKIP	Brendan Kelly	120	6.86	
Community Voice	Grant Barnes	50	2.86	
Majority		160	9.15	
Turnout		1748	34.90	
Independent **hold**		Swing		

Sandford Hill
Party	Candidate	Votes	%	±%
Labour	**Olwen Hamer***	634	50.92	
England First	Mark Leat	239	19.20	
Conservative	John Pennington	193	15.50	
Independent	Christine Bloor	131	10.52	
Liberal Democrats	Kamran Akbar	48	3.86	
Majority		395	31.73	
Turnout		1245	27.53	
Labour **hold**		Swing		

Sneyd Green
Party	Candidate	Votes	%	±%
Labour	**Debra Gratton***	523	44.70	
Conservative	Austin Cooke	292	24.96	
Independent	Richard Ibbs	158	13.50	
Independent	Geoffrey Knight	145	12.39	
Liberal Democrats	Charley Hasted	52	4.44	
Majority		231	19.74	
Turnout		1170	29.70	
Labour **hold**		Swing		

Springfields and Trent Vale
Party	Candidate	Votes	%	±%
Labour	**Sarah Hill***	537	40.04	
Liberal Democrats	Paul Billington	321	23.94	
Community Voice	Jacqueline Barnes	277	20.66	
UKIP	Michael Bednarski	206	15.36	
Majority		216	16.11	
Turnout		1341	27.68	
Labour **hold**		Swing		

Tunstall
Party	Candidate	Votes	%	±%
Independent	**Charles Wanger**	700	49.44	
Labour	Mohammed Matloob*	484	34.18	
Independent	Douglas Green	179	12.64	
Liberal Democrats	William Robinson	53	3.74	
Majority		216	15.25	
Turnout		1416	35.02	
Independent **hold**		Swing		

Weston Coyney
Party	Candidate	Votes	%	±%
Labour	**Matthew Fry**	589	42.84	
Conservative	John Daniels*	557	40.51	
UKIP	Steven Morris	190	13.82	
Liberal Democrats	Abdul Khaliq	39	2.84	
Majority		32	2.33	
Turnout		1375	36.71	
Labour **hold**		Swing		
