= 2010 Stoke-on-Trent City Council election =

2010 UK local government election

Results by ward.

Elections to Stoke-on-Trent City Council, Stoke-on-Trent, Staffordshire, England, took place on 6 May 2010, coinciding with the national General election. One third - 20 seats - of the council were up for election.

== Election result ==
After the election, the parties were represented thus: Labour 27 seats; Conservative 8 seats; British National Party 5 seats; Liberal Democrat 5 seats; Others 15 seats. Although Labour had greatly improved its position, becoming the largest party, the council remained in no overall control.

Stoke-on-Trent Council Election Result 2010
Party	Seats	Gains	Losses	Net gain/loss	Seats %	Votes %	Votes	+/−
Labour	17	11	-	11	85	35.28	34,000	
Conservative	2	-	-	0	10	24.04	23,164	
Liberal Democrats	1	-	2	-2	5	21.28	20,513	
Independent	0	-	6	-6	0	14.45	13,927	
UKIP	0	-	-	-	-	5.21	5,022	
BNP	0	-	3	-3	0	4.95	4,770	
England First	0	-	-	-	-	1.00	959	
Turnout						30.2	55,988	

== Ward results ==
Abbey Green
Party	Candidate	Votes	%	±%
Labour	Gwenyth Hassall	1639	32.85	
Conservative	Simon Sykes	1170	23.45	
BNP	Michael Durkin	835	16.73	
Liberal Democrats	Anita Gill	809	16.21	
Independent	Neil Walker	279	5.59	
Independent	Alexandrina Knight	258	5.17	
Majority		469	9.40	
Turnout		4990		
Labour gain from BNP		Swing		

Bentilee and Townsend
Party	Candidate	Votes	%	±%
Labour	Mervin Smith	1653	39.25	
BNP	Philip Sandland	864	20.52	
Conservative	Amy Sykes	618	14.68	
Liberal Democrats	Nigel Smith	567	13.46	
Independent	Wendy Johnson	291	6.91	
Independent	Margaret Lowe	218	5.18	
Majority		789	18.74	
Turnout		4211		
Labour gain from BNP		Swing		

Berryhill and Hanley East
Party	Candidate	Votes	%	±%
Labour	Adrian Knapper	1486	36.86	
Conservative	David Jones	973	24.14	
Liberal Democrats	Leslie Porch	738	18.31	
UKIP	Geoffrey Clewlow	450	11.16	
Independent	Denise Maddison	384	9.53	
Majority		513	12.73	
Turnout		4031		
Labour hold		Swing		

Blurton
Party	Candidate	Votes	%	±%
Labour	Margaret Barber	1741	35.04	
Conservative	Harold Mouat	939	18.90	
Liberal Democrats	Christine Grocock	873	17.57	
BNP	Terence Cope	764	15.38	
Independent	Jamie Naylor	652	13.12	
Majority		802	16.14	
Turnout		4969		
Labour gain from Independent		Swing		

Burslem North
Party	Candidate	Votes	%	±%
Labour	Joy Garner	2074	44.52	
Liberal Democrats	Sharon Black	978	20.99	
Conservative	Donald Smith	952	20.43	
UKIP	James Smith	655	14.06	
Majority		1096	23.52	
Turnout		4659		
Labour hold		Swing		

Burslem South
Party	Candidate	Votes	%	±%
Labour	Mohammed Pervez	1866	42.28	
Independent	Edward Owen	918	20.80	
Conservative	Gareth Fallows	838	18.99	
Liberal Democrats	Mohammed Chowdhury	511	11.58	
Independent	Forid Ali	280	6.34	
Majority		948	21.48	
Turnout		4413		
Labour hold		Swing		

Chell and Packmoor
Party	Candidate	Votes	%	±%
Labour	Anthony Fradley	1835	36.27	
Independent	Ann James	1328	26.25	
Labour	Nicholas Jellyman	842	16.64	
UKIP	Christopher McCabe	547	10.81	
Liberal Democrats	Mazhar Hussain	507	10.02	
Majority		507	10.02	
Turnout		5059		
Labour gain from Independent		Swing		

East Valley
Party	Candidate	Votes	%	±%
Labour	Matt Wilcox	1973	34.38	
Conservative	Jack Brereton	1675	29.19	
Liberal Democrats	Susan Ford	1043	18.17	
UKIP	Andrew Smith	461	8.03	
Independent	Geoffrey Knight	303	5.28	
Independent	Roger Ibbs	240	4.18	
Independent	Andrew Wragg	44	0.77	
Majority		298	5.19	
Turnout		5739		
Labour gain from Liberal Democrats		Swing		

Fenton
Party	Candidate	Votes	%	±%
Labour	Sarah Hill	1581	32.58	
Conservative	Stephen Brown	962	19.82	
Liberal Democrats	Stephen Blakemore	946	19.49	
UKIP	John Cope	465	9.58	
Independent	Marjorie Bate	451	9.29	
England First	Kathleen Ward	236	4.86	
Independent	Sharon Baggaley	212	4.37	
Majority		619	12.75	
Turnout		4853		
Labour gain from Independent		Swing		

Hanley West and Shelton
Party	Candidate	Votes	%	±%
Labour	Mohammad Wazir	1631	42.95	
Liberal Democrats	Asim Shaheen	1340	35.29	
Conservative	Eleanor Bloor	826	21.75	
Majority		291	7.66	
Turnout		3797		
Labour hold		Swing		

Hartshill and Penkhull
Party	Candidate	Votes	%	±%
Labour	Kassem al-Khatib	1492	27.21	
Liberal Democrats	Paul Billington	1452	26.48	
Conservative	Shaun Bennett	1155	21.06	
Independent	Ian Mitchell	495	9.03	
UKIP	Steven Morris	461	8.41	
Independent	Michael Williams	429	7.82	
Majority		40	0.73	
Turnout		5484		
Labour gain from Independent		Swing		

Longton North
Party	Candidate	Votes	%	±%
Labour	Thomas Tolley	2436	41.34	
Conservative	James Whitehurst	1272	21.58	
Liberal Democrats	Conrad Lubinski	814	13.81	
England First	Mark Leat	606	10.28	
UKIP	Paul Goodwin	488	8.28	
Independent	Sheila Cowell	277	4.70	
Majority		1164	19.75	
Turnout		5893		
Labour hold		Swing		

Longton South
Party	Candidate	Votes	%	±%
Labour	Olwen Hamer	2114	33.27	
Independent	Lilian Dodd	1585	24.94	
Liberal Democrats	Sadaqat Maqsoom	1373	21.61	
Conservative	Daniel Harley	1283	20.19	
Majority		529	8.32	
Turnout		6355		
Labour hold		Swing		

Meir Park and Sandon
Party	Candidate	Votes	%	±%
Conservative	Abigail Brown	2215	36.94	
Labour	Alastair Watson	1900	31.68	
Liberal Democrats	Brian Whittaker	1471	24.53	
Independent	Jacqueline Pearson	411	6.85	
Majority		315	5.25	
Turnout		5997		
Conservative hold		Swing		

Northwood and Birches
Party	Candidate	Votes	%	±%
Liberal Democrats	Jean Bowers	2091	42.99	
Labour	Mahfooz Ahmad	1194	24.55	
Conservative	Pamela Jellyman	839	17.25	
Independent	Eve Maley	740	15.21	
Majority		897	18.44	
Turnout		4864		
Liberal Democrats hold		Swing		

Norton and Bradeley
Party	Candidate	Votes	%	±%
Labour	Duncan Walker	1485	29.61	
Conservative	Austin Cooke	1045	20.83	
Independent	John Nicholls	824	16.43	
Liberal Democrats	Elaine Bowen	711	14.17	
Independent	Sheila Matthews	579	11.54	
UKIP	Sean Daley	372	7.42	
Majority		440	8.77	
Turnout		5016		
Labour gain from Independent		Swing		

Stoke and Trent Vale
Party	Candidate	Votes	%	±%
Labour	Jeremy Dillon	1475	29.10	
Liberal Democrats	Thomas Grocock	1243	24.52	
Conservative	Harold Gregory	832	16.41	
Independent	Alan Joynson	634	12.51	
BNP	Stephen Issard	524	10.34	
UKIP	Michael Harold	361	7.12	
Majority		232	4.58	
Turnout		5069		
Labour gain from Liberal Democrats		Swing		

Trentham and Hanford
Party	Candidate	Votes	%	±%
Conservative	Mark Wright	2500	38.06	
Labour	Lloyd Brown	1368	20.83	
Liberal Democrats	Alan Alcock	1321	20.11	
Independent	Peter Hayward	884	13.46	
UKIP	Philip Smith	496	7.55	
Majority		1132	17.23	
Turnout		6569		
Conservative hold		Swing		

Tunstall
Party	Candidate	Votes	%	±%
Labour	Majid Khan	1366	25.84	
Independent	Lee Wanger	1211	22.91	
Liberal Democrats	Mohammed Nadeem	887	16.78	
Conservative	Laura Baskeyfield	844	15.96	
BNP	Paula Roberts	713	13.49	
UKIP	David Parfitt	266	5.03	
Majority		155	2.93	
Turnout		5287		
Labour gain from Independent		Swing		

Weston and Meir North
Party	Candidate	Votes	%	±%
Labour	Ruth Rosenau	1691	33.16	
Conservative	Ross Ward	1384	27.14	
BNP	Anthony Simmonds	1070	20.98	
Liberal Democrats	Sabrina Bowers	838	16.43	
England First	Spencer Cartlidge	117	2.29	
Majority		307	6.02	
Turnout		5100		
Labour gain from BNP		Swing		
