= 2019 Stoke-on-Trent City Council election =

2019 UK local government election

- 2 May 2019

All 44 seats to Stoke-on-Trent City Council 23 seats needed for a majority

	First party	Second party
Party	Labour	Conservative
Last election	21 seats, 32.2%	7 seats, 22.2%
Seats won	16	15
Seat change	▼5	▲8
Popular vote	22,060	23,665
Percentage	32.4%	34.8%
Swing	▲0.2%	▲12.6%
	Third party	Fourth party
Party	City Independents	Independent
Last election	14 seats, 23.9%	0 seats, 2.8%
Seats won	12	1
Seat change	▼2	▲1
Popular vote	17,414	2,714
Percentage	25.6%	4.0%
Swing	▲1.7%	▲1.2%
- Winner of each seat at the 2019 Stoke-on-Trent City Council election
Council control before election
No overall control
Council control after election
No overall control

The 2019 Stoke-on-Trent City Council election took place on 2 May 2019 to elect members of Stoke-on-Trent City Council in England. This was on the same day as other local elections.

== Election result ==
2019 Stoke-on-Trent City Council election
Party	Candidates	Seats	Gains	Losses	Net gain/loss	Seats %	Votes %	Votes	+/−
Labour	44	16	2	7	▼5	36.4	32.4	22,060	+0.2
Conservative	44	15	8	0	▲8	34.1	34.8	23,665	+12.6
City Independents	38	12	2	4	▼2	27.3	25.6	17,414	+1.7
Independent	7	1	1	0	▲1	2.3	4.0	2,714	+1.2
Green	7	0	0	0	Steady	0.0	1.3	883	–1.0
UKIP	3	0	0	2	▼2	0.0	1.0	648	–13.7
For Britain	3	0	0	0	0	0.0	0.9	610	N/A

== Ward results ==
=== Abbey Hulton and Townsend ===
Abbey Hulton and Townsend (2 seats)
Party	Candidate	Votes	%	±%
City Independents	Mel Baddeley	766	45.0	
Labour	Jo Woolner	540	31.7	
Labour	Matt Crompton	521	30.6	
City Independents	Mike Bridgewater	488	28.6	
Conservative	Richard Brereton	232	13.6	
Independent	Steven Dennis Woolridge	215	12.6	
Conservative	James Vernon	160	9.4	
For Britain	Richard Broughan	147	8.6	
Majority		19	1.1	
Turnout		1,719	24.22	▼22.78
City Independents hold		Swing		
Labour gain from UKIP		Swing		

=== Baddeley, Milton and Norton ===
Baddeley, Milton and Norton (3 seats)
Party	Candidate	Votes	%	±%
Conservative	David Daniel Evans	1,854	49.9	
Conservative	Carl Edwards	1,629	43.8	
Conservative	James Robert Smith	1,292	34.8	
Independent	Gary Elsby	1,120	30.1	
Labour	Jeff Birks	844	22.7	
Labour	Emma Jane Ford	837	22.5	
Labour	Tina Natalello	695	18.7	
City Independents	Chris Wardle	584	15.7	
City Independents	Julie Dawn Ball	525	14.1	
City Independents	Steven Peter Taylor	514	13.8	
Majority		172	4.7	
Turnout		3,747	28.77	▼56.73
Conservative hold		Swing		
Conservative hold		Swing		
Conservative gain from City Independents		Swing		

=== Bentilee and Ubberley ===
Bentilee and Ubberley (2 seats)
Party	Candidate	Votes	%	±%
Labour	Sheila Grace Pitt	528	38.5	
Labour	Stephen Christopher Funnell	519	37.8	
City Independents	Sharon Ann Edwards	357	26.0	
UKIP	Gary Fedtschyschak	354	25.8	
City Independents	Dale Morrey	266	19.4	
For Britain	Lee Martin	233	17.0	
Conservative	Sarah Louise Kempson	143	10.4	
Conservative	Liam James Sperrin	95	6.9	
Majority		162	11.8	
Turnout		1,379	19.02	▼20.48
Labour hold		Swing		
Labour hold		Swing		

=== Birches Head and Central Forest Park ===
Birches Head and Central Forest Park (2 seats)
Party	Candidate	Votes	%	±%
City Independents	Jean Ann Bowers	869	40.4	
City Independents	Sabrina Ann Bowers	779	36.2	
Conservative	Tim Foxley	656	30.5	
Labour	Sharon Yates	627	29.1	
Conservative	Bert Loweth	605	28.1	
Labour	Muhammed Aumir	577	26.8	
Majority		123	5.7	
Turnout		2,172	28.70	▼23.40
City Independents hold		Swing		
City Independents hold		Swing		

=== Blurton East ===
Blurton East (1 seat)
Party	Candidate	Votes	%	±%
Conservative	Lorraine Beardmore	623	42.4	+18.0
Labour	Joan Bell	342	23.3	−5.5
City Independents	Susan Elizabeth Whalley	318	21.6	+2.0
Independent	Brian Ward	186	12.7	−6.9
Majority		281	19.1	
Turnout		1,480	35.96	
Conservative gain from Labour		Swing		

=== Blurton West and Newstead ===
Blurton West and Newstead (1 seat)
Party	Candidate	Votes	%	±%
Conservative	Maxine Clark	322	31.8	+10.6
City Independents	Neil Douglas Day	315	31.1	+22.7
Labour	Javid Iqbal Najmi	303	29.9	−13.3
Green	Pete Latham	72	7.1	N/A
Majority		7	0.7	
Turnout		1,026	23.31	
Conservative gain from Labour		Swing		

=== Boothen and Oakhill ===
Boothen and Oakhill (1 seat)
Party	Candidate	Votes	%	±%
Labour	Andy Platt	604	49.2	+18.3
Conservative	Paul Wilshaw	282	23.0	N/A
Green	Adam William Colclough	145	11.8	+3.5
City Independents	Dave Cooper	120	9.8	+1.9
Independent	Matthew Ken Halliday	76	6.2	N/A
Majority		322	26.2	
Turnout		1,227	30.13	
Labour hold		Swing		

=== Bradeley and Chell Heath ===
Bradeley and Chell Heath (1 seat)
Party	Candidate	Votes	%	±%
Labour	Gurmeet Singh Kallar	552	56.3	+11.7
Conservative	Rathi Pragasam	428	43.7	N/A
Majority		124	12.6	
Turnout		1,044	27.26	
Labour hold		Swing		

=== Broadway and Longton East ===
Broadway and Longton East (1 seat)
Party	Candidate	Votes	%	±%
Conservative	Ali Asman	522	50.5	+22.9
Labour	Christopher Robinson	512	49.5	+12.4
Majority		10	1.0	
Turnout		1,086	27.73	
Conservative gain from Labour		Swing		

=== Burslem Central ===
Burslem Central (1 seat)
Party	Candidate	Votes	%	±%
Labour	Jane Ashworth	583	52.8	+3.6
City Independents	Alan Edward Dutton	444	40.2	−9.0
Conservative	Sakhir Ahmad	77	7.0	−18.2
Majority		139	12.6	
Turnout		1,227	30.13	
Labour hold		Swing		

=== Burslem Park ===
Burslem Park (1 seat)
Party	Candidate	Votes	%	±%
City Independents	Lesley Marion Adams	455	44.9	N/A
Labour	Joy Anne Garner	410	40.4	+3.2
Conservative	Chaudhry Amjad Hussain	149	14.7	−6.5
Majority		45	4.5	
Turnout		1,032	26.64	
City Independents gain from Labour		Swing		

=== Dresden and Florence ===
Dresden and Florence (1 seat)
Party	Candidate	Votes	%	±%
City Independents	Lilian Jean Dodd	679	48.8	+12.3
Conservative	Mohammed Shafiq	535	33.9	+8.6
Labour	Fred Ball	272	17.3	−17.2
Majority		144	14.9	
Turnout		1,584	43.04	
City Independents hold		Swing		

=== Eaton Park ===
Eaton Park (1 seat)
Party	Candidate	Votes	%	±%
Conservative	Heather Melissa Blurton	488	45.3	N/A
Labour	Terry Crowe	358	33.2	−6.1
City Independents	Jeanette Maddison	231	21.4	−39.3
Majority		130	12.1	
Turnout		1,083	30.89	
Conservative gain from City Independents		Swing		

=== Etruria and Hanley ===
Etruria and Hanley (1 seat)
Party	Candidate	Votes	%	±%
Labour	Majid Khan	823	55.5	+0.6
City Independents	Khalil Ahmed	479	32.3	N/A
Conservative	Stuart Neil Barrow	181	12.2	N/A
Majority		344	23.2	
Turnout		1,505	37.00	
Labour hold		Swing		

=== Fenton East ===
Fenton East (1 seat)
Party	Candidate	Votes	%	±%
Labour	Paul Shotton	384	33.3	+2.6
Independent	Alan James Gerrard	382	33.1	+7.6
City Independents	Susan Helen Pickering	241	20.9	N/A
Conservative	William Peter Litherland	146	12.7	−2.7
Majority		2	0.2	
Turnout		1,154	27.88	
Labour hold		Swing		

=== Fenton West and Mount Pleasant ===
Fenton West and Mount Pleasant (1 seat)
Party	Candidate	Votes	%	±%
Independent	Cheryl Elizabeth Gerrard	520	43.2	+12.8
City Independents	Mick Bell	337	27.8	−4.8
Labour	Christine Mallaband-Brown	240	19.9	−1.4
Conservative	Tayyab Hussain	75	6.2	−7.4
Green	Brian Burgess	32	2.7	N/A
Majority		183	15.2	
Turnout		1,210	30.70	
Independent gain from UKIP		Swing		

=== Ford Green and Smallthorne ===
Ford Green and Smallthorne (1 seat)
Party	Candidate	Votes	%	±%
Labour	Candi Chetwynd	451	44.3	+8.4
Conservative	Dean Trevor Richardson	290	28.5	−3.6
City Independents	Mike Lucking	276	27.1	−4.8
Majority		161	15.8	
Turnout		1,032	24.23	
Labour hold		Swing		

=== Goldenhill and Sandyford ===
Goldenhill and Sandyford (1 seat)
Party	Candidate	Votes	%	±%
Conservative	Chandra Mohan Kanneganti	710	54.1	+26.5
Labour	Lucy Kelly	362	27.6	−17.6
City Independents	Peter Wheeldon	241	18.4	−8.8
Majority		348	26.5	
Turnout		1,331	30.75	
Conservative gain from Labour		Swing		

=== Great Chell and Packmoor ===
Great Chell and Packmoor (2 seats)
Party	Candidate	Votes	%	±%
City Independents	Ann Elizabeth James	1,250	63.5	
City Independents	Janine Frances Bridges	1,236	62.8	
Labour	Sue Akkurt	462	23.5	
Labour	Jamie Cameron Tennant	332	16.9	
Conservative	Mark Jellyman	236	12.0	
Conservative	Rahim Danyal Suleman	124	6.3	
Majority		774	39.3	
Turnout		1,980	25.53	
City Independents hold		Swing		
City Independents hold		Swing		

=== Hanford and Trentham ===
Hanford and Trentham (2 seats)
Party	Candidate	Votes	%	±%
Conservative	Daniel Mark Jellyman	2,673	73.7	
Conservative	Rachel Louise Kelsall	2,120	58.5	
City Independents	Harold David Gregory	461	12.7	
Labour	John Hume Cunnison	452	12.5	
Labour	Sue Ramm	450	12.4	
City Independents	Ian Stuart Jones	384	10.6	
Green	Alan Edmund Borgars	300	8.3	
Majority		659	45.8	
Turnout		3,643	39.33	
Conservative hold		Swing		
Conservative gain from City Independents		Swing		

=== Hanley Park and Shelton ===
Hanley Park and Shelton (1 seat)
Party	Candidate	Votes	%	±%
Labour	Amjid Wazir	577	69.4	+5.4
City Independents	Fawad Gul	189	22.7	+9.2
Conservative	Sharon Wilshaw	66	7.9	N/A
Majority		388	46.7	
Turnout		839	38.73	
Labour hold		Swing		

=== Hartshill and Basford ===
Hartshill and Basford (1 seat)
Party	Candidate	Votes	%	±%
Labour	Shaun Patrick Pender	802	61.6	+21.6
Conservative	Christine Warren	295	22.6	−1.0
City Independents	Gulzar Ahmed	206	15.8	+10.2
Majority		507	39.0	
Turnout		1,323	29.52	
Labour hold		Swing		

=== Hollybush and Longton West ===
Hollybush and Longton West (1 seat)
Party	Candidate	Votes	%	±%
City Independents	Shaun Lee Bennett	432	44.1	+12.8
Labour	Kath Banks	375	38.3	−3.1
Conservative	Carlton Espley	172	17.6	−5.6
Majority		57	5.8	
Turnout		987	23.32	
City Independents gain from Labour		Swing		

=== Joiners Square ===
Joiners Square (1 seat)
Party	Candidate	Votes	%	±%
Labour	Alastair Scott Watson	644	58.1	+16.3
City Independents	Asim Shaheen	335	30.2	+11.0
Conservative	Claire Picken	129	11.6	N/A
Majority		309	27.9	
Turnout		1,131	28.35	
Labour hold		Swing		

=== Lightwood North and Normacot ===
Lightwood North and Normacot (1 seat)
Party	Candidate	Votes	%	±%
Conservative	Sadaqat Maqsoom	1,436	59.0	+13.7
Labour	Bagh Ali	998	41.0	+1.1
Majority		438	18.0	
Turnout		2,458	61.68	
Conservative hold		Swing		

=== Little Chell and Stanfield ===
Little Chell and Stanfield (1 seat)
Party	Candidate	Votes	%	±%
Labour	David Williams	513	45.4	+8.3
City Independents	Dave Conway	406	35.9	−8.9
UKIP	Lian Brennan	140	12.4	−5.7
Conservative	Waheed Karim	72	6.4	N/A
Majority		107	9.5	
Turnout		1,134	27.18	
Labour gain from City Independents		Swing		

=== Meir Hay ===
Meir Hay (1 seat)
Party	Candidate	Votes	%	±%
Conservative	Craig David Beardmore	861	68.1	+32.7
Labour	Asim Ali	234	18.5	−15.6
City Independents	Teresa Joy Slizewski-Whalley	169	13.4	N/A
Majority		627	49.6	
Turnout		1,278	33.23	
Conservative hold		Swing		

=== Meir North ===
Meir North (1 seat)
Party	Candidate	Votes	%	±%
Labour	Desiree Gail Elliott	244	25.6	−13.7
Independent	Ruth Victoria Rosenau	215	22.5	−16.8
Conservative	Steve Brown	176	18.4	−5.1
City Independents	Michelle Suzanne Swift	165	17.3	N/A
UKIP	David Pegg	154	16.1	−16.4
Majority		29	3.1	
Turnout		962	22.50	
Labour hold		Swing		

=== Meir Park ===
Meir Park (1 seat)
Party	Candidate	Votes	%	±%
Conservative	Abi Brown	1,130	84.4	+9.1
Labour	Marty Christopher Day	209	15.6	−9.1
Majority		921	68.8	
Turnout		1,369	36.94	
Conservative hold		Swing		

=== Meir South ===
Meir South (1 seat)
Party	Candidate	Votes	%	±%
Conservative	Faisal Hussain	405	39.7	+17.5
Labour	Debbie Wheeldon	326	32.0	−7.2
City Independents	John Ayres	288	28.3	+15.6
Majority		79	7.7	
Turnout		1,027	27.13	
Conservative gain from Labour		Swing		

=== Moorcroft ===
Moorcroft (1 seat)
Party	Candidate	Votes	%	±%
Labour	Mohammed Pervez	992	60.4	+5.5
Conservative	Tariq Mahmood	650	39.6	+23.3
Majority		342	20.8	
Turnout		1,691	44.12	
Labour hold		Swing		

=== Penkhull and Stoke ===
Penkhull and Stoke (1 seat)
Party	Candidate	Votes	%	±%
City Independents	Randy Conteh	679	44.5	+1.8
Labour	Jim Bradbury	620	40.6	+14.3
Green	Robert Hywel Bennett Griffiths	129	8.4	−1.4
Conservative	Mohammed Ateeq	99	6.5	−11.9
Majority		59	3.9	
Turnout		1,538	33.74	
City Independents hold		Swing		

=== Sandford Hill ===
Sandford Hill (1 seat)
Party	Candidate	Votes	%	±%
Labour	Ally Simcock	430	40.6	+1.6
Conservative	James Robert Nicholas Watts	399	37.7	+17.9
For Britain	Alex Wright	230	21.7	N/A
Majority		31	2.9	
Turnout		1,071	25.65	
Labour hold		Swing		

=== Sneyd Green ===
Sneyd Green (1 seat)
Party	Candidate	Votes	%	±%
City Independents	Joanne Clare Powell-Beckett	561	56.2	+21.8
Labour	Helen Patricia Harrison	288	28.8	−4.8
Conservative	Beth Peake	150	15.0	−16.9
Majority		273	27.08	
Turnout		1,008	26.25	
City Independents hold		Swing		

=== Springfields and Trent Vale ===
Springfields and Trent Vale (1 seat)
Party	Candidate	Votes	%	±%
City Independents	Jackie Barnes	567	47.6	+15.6
Labour	Birgit Allport	417	35.0	+10.1
Green	Jade Hanna Taylor	114	9.6	+2.2
Conservative	Bilal Mohammad	92	7.7	N/A
Majority		150	12.6	
Turnout		1,196	27.14	
City Independents hold		Swing		

=== Tunstall ===
Tunstall (1 seat)
Party	Candidate	Votes	%	±%
City Independents	Lee Wanger	584	47.1	−0.3
Labour	Omair Ahmed Hussain	529	42.6	+3.6
Conservative	Christopher Martin John Mulroy	128	10.3	−3.4
Majority		55	4.5	
Turnout		1,254	32.97	
City Independents hold		Swing		

=== Weston Coyney ===
Weston Coyney (1 seat)
Party	Candidate	Votes	%	±%
Conservative	Ross Andrew Irving	758	60.2	+32.5
Labour	Chris Walker	282	22.4	−1.2
City Independents	Julian Richard Read	128	10.2	−0.6
Green	Jan Zablocki	91	7.2	−7.5
Majority		476	37.8	
Turnout		1,272	32.36	
Conservative hold		Swing		

== By-elections ==
There have been three by-elections since the last set of elections in May 2019.

=== Moorcroft ===
The first was the Moorcroft by-election, which was held to replace former Labour group leader Mr. Mohammed Pervez on 6 May 2021.

Moorcroft (1 seat)
Party	Candidate	Votes	%	±%
Conservative	Tariq Mahmood	769	49.7	+10.1
Labour	Javid Najmi	702	45.4	−15.0
TUSC	Andy Butcher	77	5.0	N/A
Majority		67	4.3	
Turnout		1548	39.39	▼4.73
Conservative gain from Labour		Swing		

=== Penkhull and Stoke ===
The second was the Penkhull and Stoke by-election, which was held to replace the former City Independent Councillor Mr Randi Conteh, on 1 July 2021.

Penkhull and Stoke (1 seat)
Party	Candidate	Votes	%	±%
Conservative	Dean Richardson	582	40.6	+34.1
Labour	Lee Polshaw	572	39.9	−0.7
City Independents	Hazel Doreen Lyth	171	11.9	−32.6
Green	Adam Colclough	109	7.6	−0.8
Majority		10	0.7	
Turnout		1,434	30.64	▼3.10
Conservative gain from City Independents		Swing		

=== Bentilee and Ubberley ===
The third was the Bentilee and Ubberley by-election, which was held to replace the former Labour Councillor Mr Stephen Funnell, on 22 September 2022.

Bentilee and Ubberley (2 seats)
Party	Candidate	Votes	%	±%
Labour	Lynn Susan Watkins	469	62.5	+24.7
City Independents	Sharon Ann Edwards	143	19.1	−6.9
Conservative	Matthew James Bridger	138	18.4	+8.0
Majority		326	43.4	
Turnout		750	10.76	▼8.26
Labour hold		Swing		
