= 2015 Stoke-on-Trent City Council election =

2015 local election in England

Results by ward

The 2015 Stoke-on-Trent City Council election took place on 7 May 2015 to elect members of Stoke-on-Trent City Council in England. This was on the same day as other local elections and the general election.

== Election result ==
After the election, results were as follows: Labour 21, City Independents 14, Conservative 7, UKIP 2. The Labour Party lost 14 seats, with gains for the Conservatives, City Independents and UKIP.

Stoke-on-Trent local election result 2015
Party	Seats	Gains	Losses	Net gain/loss	Seats %	Votes %	Votes	+/−
Labour	21	1	15	-14	47.72	32.16	40,597	+10,906
City Independents	14	14	0	+14	31.81	22.15	22,793	+22,793
Conservative	7	6	0	+6	15.90	22.19	28,020	+16,591
UKIP	2	2	0	+2	4.54	14.64	18,490	+16,608
Independent	0	0	8	-8	0.00	3.45	3,547	-9,602
Green	0	0	0	0	0.00	2.30	2,911	+2,911
Liberal Democrats	0	0	0	0	0.00	1.05	1,332	-5,157
TUSC	0	0	0	0	0.00	0.85	1,084	+598
The British Voice	0	0	0	0	0.00	0.06	82	+82
Turnout							126221	+61364

== Ward results ==
=== Abbey Hulton and Townsend ===
Abbey Hulton and Townsend (2 seats)
Party	Candidate	Votes	%	±%
UKIP	Richard Broughan	1489	25.38	
City Independents	Melanie Baddeley	1449	24.70	
Labour	Gwen Hassall	1208	20.59	
Labour	Adrian Knapper	918	15.65	
Green	Dave Muller	410	6.99	
Green	Luke Bellamy	392	6.68	
Majority		241	0.68	
Turnout			47.0	
UKIP gain from Labour		Swing		
City Independents gain from Labour		Swing		

=== Baddeley, Milton and Norton ===
Baddeley, Milton and Norton (3 seats)
Party	Candidate	Votes	%	±%
Conservative	Jack Brereton	3,102	16.66	
Conservative	Dave Evans	2,125	11.41	
City Independents	Anthony Munday	2,099	11.27	
UKIP	Colin Rushton	2049	11.00	
Conservative	Judy Wagg	1896	10.18	
Labour	Paul William Humphreys	1654	8.88	
Labour	Tina Natalello	1475	7.92	
Independent	Gary Elsby	1420	7.63	
City Independents	Kelsey Stair	1381	7.42	
Labour	Javid Iqbal Najmi	1073	5.76	
TUSC	Nicey Keen	347	1.86	
Majority		50	0.14	
Turnout		18621	85.5	
Conservative hold		Swing		
Conservative gain from Labour		Swing		
City Independents gain from Labour		Swing		

=== Bentilee and Ubberley ===
Bentilee and Ubberley (2 seats)
Party	Candidate	Votes	%	±%
Labour	Sheila Pitt*	1089	19.79	
Labour	Stephen Funnell	1059	19.25	
UKIP	Brendan Kelly	1052	19.12	
UKIP	Scott Stevenson	902	16.39	
City Independents	Alan Joinson	701	12.74	
City Independents	Sharon Edwards	617	11.21	
The British Voice	David Leese	82	1.49	
Majority		7	0.13	
Turnout		5502	39.5	
Labour hold		Swing		
Labour hold		Swing		

=== Birches Head and Central Forest Park ===
Birches Head and Central Forest Park (2 seats)
Party	Candidate	Votes	%	±%
City Independents	Jean Bowers	1994	25.27	
City Independents	Sabrina Bowers	1464	18.55	
Labour	Mark Meredith	1298	16.45	
Labour	Shirley Kliment-Temple	1176	14.90	
Conservative	Lorraine Whalley	877	11.11	
Conservative	Phil Whalley	748	9.48	
Liberal Democrats	Kieran Clarke	334	4.23	
Majority		166	2.10	
Turnout		7891	52.1	
City Independents gain from Independent		Swing		
City Independents gain from Labour		Swing		

=== Blurton East ===
Blurton East
Party	Candidate	Votes	%	±%
Labour	Joan Bell	726	28.81	
UKIP	Jacqueline Mountford	657	26.07	
Conservative	Christine Warren	615	24.40	
City Independents	Brian Ward	493	14.90	
TUSC	Neil Singh	29	1.15	
Majority		69	2.74	
Turnout		2520		
Labour gain from Independent		Swing		

=== Blurton West and Newstead ===
Blurton West and Newstead
Party	Candidate	Votes	%	±%
Labour	Lloyd Brown	883	43.20	
UKIP	Adam Mountford	506	24.76	
Conservative	James Vernon	433	21.18	
City Independents	Arthur Burton	171	8.37	
TUSC	Matt Wright	51	2.50	
Majority		377	18.44	
Turnout		2044		
Labour hold		Swing		

=== Boothen and Oakhill ===
Boothen and Oakhill
Party	Candidate	Votes	%	±%
Labour	Andy Platt	746	30.92	
UKIP	Mick Harold	681	28.22	
Independent	Alan Barrett	402	16.66	
Green	Martin Parker	201	8.33	
Liberal Democrats	Tom Grocock	193	8.00	
City Independents	Grant Barnes	190	7.87	
Majority		65	2.70	
Turnout		2413	52.6	
Labour hold		Swing		

=== Bradeley and Chell Heath ===
Bradeley and Chell Heath
Party	Candidate	Votes	%	±%
Labour	Gurmeet Kallar	896	44.58	
UKIP	Mike Lucking	788	39.20	
City Independents	Duncan Walker	326	16.22	
Majority		108	5.38	
Turnout		2010	51.1	
Labour hold		Swing		

=== Broadway and Longton East ===
Broadway and Longton East
Party	Candidate	Votes	%	±%
Labour	Chris Robinson	799	37.06	
UKIP	Richard Bennett	711	32.98	
Conservative	Hayley Delanchy	594	27.55	
TUSC	Liat Norris	52	2.41	
Majority		88	4.08	
Turnout		2156		
Labour hold		Swing		

=== Burslem Central ===
Burslem Central
Party	Candidate	Votes	%	±%
Labour	Alan Dutton	919	49.25	
City Independents	Stirling Dunn	477	25.56	
Conservative	Thomas Roster	470	25.19	
Majority		442	23.69	
Turnout		1866	44.0	
Labour hold		Swing		

=== Burslem Park ===
Burslem Park
Party	Candidate	Votes	%	±%
Labour	Joy Garner	795	37.17	
UKIP	Martin Bayley-Spencer	685	32.02	
Conservative	Laura Hoult	453	21.18	
Green	Jacob Davies	206	9.63	
Majority		80	5.15	
Turnout		2139	50.6	
Labour hold		Swing		

=== Dresden and Florence ===
Dresden and Florence
Party	Candidate	Votes	%	±%
City Independents	Lilian Dodd	877	36.51	
Labour	Arif Hussain	829	34.51	
Conservative	Shakeel Mohammed	607	25.27	
TUSC	Jacob Davies	89	3.71	
Majority		48	2.00	
Turnout		2402		
City Independents gain from Labour		Swing		

=== Eaton Park ===
Eaton Park
Party	Candidate	Votes	%	±%
City Independents	Rita Dale	1227	60.71	
Labour	Terry Crowe	794	39.29	
Majority		433	21.42	
Turnout		2021	55.1	
City Independents gain from Labour		Swing		

=== Etruria and Hanley ===
Etruria and Hanley
Party	Candidate	Votes	%	±%
Labour	Majid Khan	925	54.90	
UKIP	Mohammad Iqbal	437	25.93	
Liberal Democrats	Stephen Morris	177	10.50	
Green	Kevin Burke	146	8.66	
Majority		488	28.97	
Turnout		1685	53.0	
Labour hold		Swing		

=== Fenton East ===
Fenton East
Party	Candidate	Votes	%	±%
Labour	Paul Shotton	706	30.71	
UKIP	Tony Williams	652	28.36	
Independent	Alan Gerrard	587	25.53	
Conservative	Nicholas Jellyman	354	15.40	
Majority		54	2.35	
Turnout		2299		
Labour hold		Swing		

=== Fenton West and Mount Pleasant ===
Fenton West and Mount Pleasant
Party	Candidate	Votes	%	±%
UKIP	Mick Bell	770	32.57	
Independent	Cheryl Gerrard	719	30.41	
Labour	Muhammad Aumir	503	21.28	
Conservative	Stephanie Booth	321	13.58	
TUSC	Chris Parton	51	2.16	
Majority		51	2.16	
Turnout		2364		
UKIP gain from Labour		Swing		

=== Ford Green and Smallthorne ===
Ford Green and Smallthorne
Party	Candidate	Votes	%	±%
Labour	Candi Chetwynd	796	35.94	
Conservative	Richard Brereton	712	32.14	
City Independents	Rob Reynolds	707	31.92	
Majority		84	3.80	
Turnout		2215	47.0	
Labour hold		Swing		

=== Goldenhill and Sandyford ===
Goldenhill and Sandyford
Party	Candidate	Votes	%	±%
Labour	Martin Garner	965	45.20	
Conservative	Jonathan Jellyman	589	27.59	
City Independents	Steve Taylor	581	27.21	
Majority		376	17.61	
Turnout		2135	49.2	
Labour hold		Swing		

=== Great Chell and Packmoor ===
Great Chell and Packmoor (2 seats)
Party	Candidate	Votes	%	±%
City Independents	Ann James	2071	27.50	
City Independents	Janine Bridges	2003	26.60	
Conservative	Andrew Beech	1380	18.32	
Labour	Lynn Watkins	1243	16.51	
Labour	Abul Azad	834	11.07	
Majority		623	8.28	
Turnout		7531	55.0	
City Independents gain from Labour		Swing		
City Independents gain from Independent		Swing		

=== Hanford and Trentham ===
Hanford and Trentham (2 seats)
Party	Candidate	Votes	%	±%
City Independents	Terence Follows	2301	19.68	
Conservative	Daniel Jellyman	2000	17.10	
City Independents	Peter Hayward	1900	16.25	
Conservative	Megan Tilsley	1563	13.37	
Labour	Mark Glover-Jones	1078	9.22	
UKIP	Julia Evans	1054	9.01	
Labour	Paul Singh	902	7.71	
UKIP	Harold Gregory	896	7.66	
Majority		1000	0.85	
Turnout		11694		
City Independents gain from Independent		Swing		
Conservative gain from Independent		Swing		

=== Hanley Park and Shelton ===
Hanley Park and Shelton
Party	Candidate	Votes	%	±%
Labour	Amjid Wazir	974	64.04	
Green	Said Karimi	211	13.87	
City Independents	Janet Tinsley	205	13.48	
Liberal Democrats	Arthur Slight	131	8.61	
Majority		763	50.17	
Turnout		1521	37.7	
Labour hold		Swing		

=== Hartshill and Basford ===
Hartshill and Basford
Party	Candidate	Votes	%	±%
Labour	Shaun Pender	1095	40.01	
Conservative	Sam Richardson	646	23.60	
UKIP	Sharon Hemmings	509	18.60	
Green	Thomas Holland	229	8.37	
City Independents	Rob Ledgar	153	5.59	
Liberal Democrats	Maxine Morrow	105	3.84	
Majority		449	16.41	
Turnout		2737	56.6	
Labour hold		Swing		

=== Hollybush and Longton West ===
Hollybush and Longton West
Party	Candidate	Votes	%	±%
Labour	Kath Banks	965	41.42	
City Independents	Shaun Bennett	729	31.29	
Conservative	Lorraine Beardmore	540	23.18	
TUSC	Kris Caci	96	4.12	
Majority		236	10.13	
Turnout		2330		
Labour hold		Swing		

=== Joiners Square ===
Joiners Square
Party	Candidate	Votes	%	±%
Labour	Alastair Watson	752	41.80	
UKIP	Gulzar Ahmed	417	23.18	
City Independents	David Walley	345	19.18	
Green	Glyn Wade	156	8.67	
Liberal Democrats	Waqas-Ur Rashid	129	7.17	
Majority		335	18.62	
Turnout		1799		
Labour hold		Swing		

=== Lightwood North and Normacot ===
Lightwood North and Normacot
Party	Candidate	Votes	%	±%
Conservative	Sadaqat Maqsoom	1277	45.25	
Labour	Bagh Ali	1126	39.90	
Independent	Alan Lear	419	14.85	
Majority		151	5.35	
Turnout		2822		
Conservative gain from Labour		Swing		

=== Little Chell and Stanfield ===
Little Chell and Stanfield
Party	Candidate	Votes	%	±%
City Independents	David Conway	1018	44.83	
Labour	Sarah Watson	843	37.12	
UKIP	Mohammad Naeem	410	18.05	
Majority		175	7.71	
Turnout		2271		
City Independents gain from Independent		Swing		

=== Meir Hay ===
Meir Hay
Party	Candidate	Votes	%	±%
Conservative	Craig Beardmore	832	35.80	
Labour	David Williams	802	34.51	
UKIP	Umar Ghalani	592	25.47	
TUSC	Lee Stockley	98	4.22	
Majority		30	1.29	
Turnout		2324		
Conservative gain from Labour		Swing		

=== Meir North ===
Meir North
Party	Candidate	Votes	%	±%
Labour	Ruth Rosenau	832	39.32	
UKIP	Phil Smith	687	32.47	
Conservative	Margaret Brown	498	23.53	
TUSC	Andy Bentley	99	4.68	
Majority		145	6.85	
Turnout		2116		
Labour hold		Swing		

=== Meir Park ===
Meir Park
Party	Candidate	Votes	%	±%
Conservative	Abi Brown	1997	75.33	
Labour	Kamran Sabir	654	24.67	
Majority		1343	50.66	
Turnout		2651		
Conservative hold		Swing		

=== Meir South ===
Meir South
Party	Candidate	Votes	%	±%
Labour	Debbie Wheeldon	746	39.20	
UKIP	Eric Martin	451	23.70	
Conservative	Stephen Brown	422	22.18	
City Independents	John Ayres	242	12.72	
TUSC	John Morrey	42	2.21	
Majority		295	15.50	
Turnout		1903		
Labour hold		Swing		

=== Moorcroft ===
Moorcroft
Party	Candidate	Votes	%	±%
Labour	Mohammed Pervez	1153	54.88	
City Independents	Neil Day	465	22.13	
Conservative	John Francis	343	16.33	
Green	Sean Adam	140	6.66	
Majority		688	32.75	
Turnout		2101		
Labour hold		Swing		

=== Penkhull and Stoke ===
Penkhull and Stoke
Party	Candidate	Votes	%	±%
City Independents	Randolph Conteh	1209	42.68	
Labour	Daniel Cunningham	745	26.30	
Conservative	Hannah Lawrence	521	18.39	
Green	Elaine Holland	279	9.85	
Liberal Democrats	Liam Perez	79	2.79	
Majority		464	16.38	
Turnout		2833		
City Independents gain from Independent		Swing		

=== Sandford Hill ===
Sandford Hill
Party	Candidate	Votes	%	±%
Labour	Olwen Hamer	911	38.96	
UKIP	John Davis	855	36.57	
Conservative	Lisa Li	463	19.80	
TUSC	Lucy Williams	109	4.66	
Majority		56	2.39	
Turnout		2338		
Labour hold		Swing		

=== Sneyd Green ===
Sneyd Green
Party	Candidate	Votes	%	±%
City Independents	Joanne Powell-Beckett	742	34.45	
Labour	Debra Gratton	724	33.61	
Conservative	Beth Peake	688	31.94	
Majority		18	0.84	
Turnout		2154		
City Independents gain from Labour		Swing		

=== Springfields and Trent Vale ===
Springfields and Trent Vale
Party	Candidate	Votes	%	±%
City Independents	Jackie Barnes	790	32.05	
UKIP	Mick Bednarski	695	28.19	
Labour	Mubsira Aumir	614	24.91	
Liberal Democrats	Christine Grocock	184	7.46	
Green	Adam Colclough	182	7.38	
Majority		95	3.86	
Turnout		2465		
City Independents gain from Labour		Swing		

=== Tunstall ===
Tunstall
Party	Candidate	Votes	%	±%
City Independents	Lee Wanger	969	47.36	
Labour	Mohammed Matloob	797	38.95	
Conservative	Ian Horton	280	13.69	
Majority		172	8.41	
Turnout		2046		
City Independents gain from Independent		Swing		

=== Weston Coyney ===
Weston Coyney
Party	Candidate	Votes	%	±%
Conservative	Ross Irving	674	27.67	
Labour	Nicola Howell	575	23.60	
UKIP	Bruce Reed	545	22.37	
Green	Jan Zablocki	359	14.74	
City Independents	Cheryl Barnett	262	10.76	
TUSC	Mandy Marfleet	21	0.86	
Majority		99	4.07	
Turnout		2436		
Conservative gain from Labour		Swing		
