= 2023 Stoke-on-Trent City Council election =

English local authority election

- 4 May 2023

All 44 seats to Stoke-on-Trent City Council 23 seats needed for a majority

	First party	Second party	Third party
Leader	Jane Ashworth	Abi Brown	Ann James
Party	Labour	Conservative	City Independents
Last election	16 seats, 32.4%	15 seats, 34.8%	12 seats, 25.6%
Seats won	29	14	1
Seat change	▲13	▼1	▼11
Popular vote	35,983	29,697	5,908
Percentage	46.9%	38.7%	7.7%
Swing	▲14.5%	▲3.9%	▼17.9%
- Winner of each seat at the 2023 Stoke-on-Trent City Council election
Leader before election
Abi Brown
Conservative
No overall control
Leader after election
Jane Ashworth
Labour

The 2023 Stoke-on-Trent City Council election took place on 4 May 2023 to elect members of Stoke-on-Trent City Council in England. This was on the same day as other local elections. New ward boundaries took effect for this election, although the number of councillors stayed the same at 44.

Prior to the election the council was under no overall control, being led by a Conservative minority administration. Labour took a majority of the seats at the election. Labour group leader Jane Ashworth was appointed leader of the council at the subsequent annual council meeting on 25 May 2023.

== Result ==
2023 Stoke-on-Trent City Council election
Party	Candidates	Seats	Gains	Losses	Net gain/loss	Seats %	Votes %	Votes	+/−
Labour	44	29	14	0	▲13	65.90	46.9	35,983	+14.5
Conservative	42	14	1	1	▼1	31.8	38.7	29,697	+3.9
City Independents	15	1	0	14	▼11	0.0	7.7	5,908	–17.9
Independent	15	0	1	1	▼1	2.3	5.3	4,084	+1.3
Green	6	0	0	0	Steady	0.0	1.2	953	–0.1
Reform	1	0	0	0	Steady	0.0	0.1	46	N/A
Communist	1	0	0	0	Steady	0.0	<0.1	25	N/A

== Ward results ==
The results for each ward were as follows, with an asterisk (*) indicating an encumber councillor standing for re-election.

=== Abbey Hulton ===
Abbey Hulton
Party	Candidate	Votes	%	±%
Labour	Steve Watkins	429	50.1	
Independent	Mel Baddeley*	272	31.8	
City Independents	Amanda Webber	109	12.7	
Reform	Luke Shenton	46	5.4	
Majority		157	18.3	
Turnout		862	17.2	
Rejected ballots		6	0.7	
Registered electors		5,002		
Labour win (new seat)				

=== Baddeley, Milton & Norton ===
Baddeley, Milton & Norton (3 seats)
Party	Candidate	Votes	%	±%
Conservative	Dave Evans*	1,743	45.7	
Conservative	Carl Edwards*	1,581	41.5	
Labour	Duncan Walker	1,508	39.5	
Labour	Daniel Mazhar	1,480	38.8	
Conservative	Jenny Taylor	1,443	37.8	
Labour	Fiona Wood	1,443	37.8	
Independent	Gary Elsby	817	21.4	
Turnout		3,813	26.7	
Rejected ballots		13	0.3	
Registered electors		14,306		
Conservative hold				
Conservative hold				
Labour gain from Conservative				

=== Basford & Hartshill ===
Basford & Hartshill
Party	Candidate	Votes	%	±%
Labour	Shaun Pender	930	82.7	
Conservative	Waheed Karim	194	17.3	
Majority		736	65.4	
Turnout		1,138	25.9	
Rejected ballots		14	1.2	
Registered electors		4,399		
Labour win (new seat)				

=== Bentilee, Ubberley & Townsend ===
Bentilee, Ubberley & Townsend (2 seats)
Party	Candidate	Votes	%	±%
Labour	Sarah Colclough	883	61.7	
Labour	Lynn Watkins	717	50.1	
City Independents	Sharon Edwards	308	21.5	
Conservative	Christine Warren	249	17.4	
Conservative	James Richardson	243	17.0	
City Independents	Dale Morrey	217	15.2	
Turnout		1,431	15.7	
Rejected ballots		8	0.6	
Registered electors		9,102		
Labour win (new seat)				
Labour win (new seat)				

=== Birches Head & Northwood ===
Birches Head & Northwood (2 seats)
Party	Candidate	Votes	%	±%
Labour	Steve Blakemore	957	45.3	
Labour	Adrian Knapper	830	39.3	
City Independents	Jean Bowers	694	32.8	
City Independents	Ralf O'Neill	509	24.1	
Conservative	Wil Weaver	432	20.4	
Conservative	Harold Gregory	412	19.5	
Green	Morrighan Bridie Jordan	98	4.6	
Turnout		2,113	25.5	
Rejected ballots		4	0.2	
Registered electors		8,278		
Labour win (new seat)				
Labour win (new seat)				

=== Blurton ===
Blurton
Party	Candidate	Votes	%	±%
Conservative	Lorraine Beardmore	705	52.9	
Labour	Kath Banks	495	37.2	
Independent	Brian Ward	75	5.6	
City Independents	Susan Whalley	57	4.3	
Majority		210	15.7	
Turnout		1,339	28.2	
Rejected ballots		7	0.5	
Registered electors		4,756		
Conservative win (new seat)				

=== Boothen ===
Boothen
Party	Candidate	Votes	%	±%
Labour	Andy Platt	662	66.8	
Conservative	Fesar Hussain	126	12.7	
Independent	Mark Anthony Warrington	107	10.8	
Green	Adam Colclough	96	9.7	
Majority		536	54.1	
Turnout		997	24.8	
Rejected ballots		6	0.6	
Registered electors		4,023		
Labour win (new seat)				

=== Bradeley & Chell Heath ===
Bradeley & Chell Heath
Party	Candidate	Votes	%	±%
Labour	Gurmeet Singh Kallar	787	79.8	+23.5
Conservative	Dany Suleman	125	12.6	–31.1
Independent	Steven Taylor	83	8.3	N/A
Majority		662	67.2	+54.6
Turnout		995	23.7	–3.6
Registered electors		4,205		
Labour hold		Swing	▲27.3	

=== Bucknall & Eaton Park ===
Bucknall & Eaton Park
Party	Candidate	Votes	%	±%
Conservative	Heather Blurton	693	49.7	
Labour	Sam Hackney	648	46.5	
City Independents	Andrew Colin Bates	54	3.9	
Majority		45	3.2	
Turnout		1,400	29.7	
Rejected ballots		5	0.4	
Registered electors		4,718		
Conservative win (new seat)				

=== Burslem ===
Burslem Central (1 seat)
Party	Candidate	Votes	%	±%
Labour Co-op	Jane Ashworth	700	75.4	
Conservative	Waqas Shahzad	228	24.6	
Majority		472	50.8	
Turnout		939	20.4	
Registered electors		4,595		
Rejected ballots		11	1.2	
Labour Co-op win (new seat)				

=== Burslem Park ===
Burslem Park (1 seat)
Party	Candidate	Votes	%	±%
Labour Co-op	Glen Watson	676	61.5	+21.1
Conservative	Lesley Adams	423	38.5	+23.8
Majority		253	23.0	N/A
Turnout		1,102	25.4	–1.2
Rejected ballots		4	0.4	
Registered electors		4,335		
Labour Co-op gain from City Independents		Swing	▼1.3	

=== Dresden & Florence ===
Dresden & Florence
Party	Candidate	Votes	%	±%
City Independents	Lilian Jean Dodd	637	49.5	+0.7
Labour	Nigel Ross	517	40.2	+22.9
Conservative	Siona Louise Williams	132	10.3	–23.6
Majority		120	9.3	–5.6
Turnout		1,292	35.1	–7.9
Registered electors		3,680		
Rejected ballots		6	0.5	
City Independents hold		Swing	▼11.1	

=== Etruria & Hanley ===
Etruria & Hanley
Party	Candidate	Votes	%	±%
Labour	Majid Khan	803	56.0	+0.5
Independent	Qamar Sohail	381	26.6	N/A
Conservative	Khalil Ahmed	249	17.4	+5.2
Majority		422	29.4	+6.2
Turnout		1,451	33.8	–3.2
Rejected ballots		18	1.2	
Registered electors		4,298		
Labour hold				

=== Fenton East ===
Fenton East (1 seat)
Party	Candidate	Votes	%	±%
Labour	Mubsira Aumir	513	47.5	+14.2
Independent	Alan James Gerrard	340	31.5	–1.6
Conservative	Grant Christian Barnes	226	21.0	+8.3
Majority		173	16.0	+15.8
Turnout		1,082	24.1	–3.8
Rejected ballots		3	0.3	
Registered electors		4,491		
Labour hold		Swing	▲7.9	

=== Fenton West & Mount Pleasant ===
Fenton West & Mount Pleasant
Party	Candidate	Votes	%	±%
Labour	Lyn Mary Sharpe	581	47.4	+27.5
Independent	Cheryl Elizabeth Gerrard	331	27.0	–16.2
Conservative	Khawar Ali	289	23.6	+17.4
Communist	Jordan Roden	25	2.0	N/A
Majority		250	20.4	N/A
Turnout		1,231	27.6	–3.1
Rejected ballots		5	0.4	
Registered electors		4,466		
Labour gain from Independent		Swing	▲22.0	

=== Ford Green & Smallthorne ===
Ford Green & Smallthorne
Party	Candidate	Votes	%	±%
Labour Co-op	Diane Williams	775	68.3	+24.0
Conservative	Candi Chetwynd	354	31.9	+3.4
Majority		401	36.2	+20.4
Turnout		1,134	24.0	–0.2
Rejected ballots		5	0.4	
Registered electors		4,734		
Labour hold		Swing	▲10.2	

=== Goldenhill & Sandyford ===
Goldenhill & Sandyford
Party	Candidate	Votes	%	±%
Conservative	Chandra Mohan Kanneganti	860	71.4	+17.3
Labour	Jeffrey Birks	265	22.0	–5.6
Independent	Alan Edward Dutton	79	6.6	N/A
Majority		595	49.4	–17.3
Turnout		1,207	25.5	–5.3
Rejected ballots		3	0.2	
Registered electors		4,742		
Conservative hold		Swing	▲11.5	

=== Great Chell & Packmoor ===
Great Chell & Packmoor (2 seats)
Party	Candidate	Votes	%	±%
Labour	Sue Akkurt	774	39.3	
Labour	David Mountford	710	36.1	
Conservative	Jan Bridges	621	31.6	
City Independents	Ann James	602	30.6	
Conservative	James Robert Smith	508	25.8	
City Independents	David Owens	466	23.7	
Turnout		1,968	23.1	
Rejected ballots		6	0.3	
Registered electors		8,515		
Labour gain from City Independents				
Labour gain from City Independents				

=== Hanford, Newstead & Trentham ===
Hanford, Newstead & Trentham (3 seats)
Party	Candidate	Votes	%	±%
Conservative	Daniel Jellyman	2,283	56.8	
Conservative	Maxine Clark	2,070	51.4	
Conservative	Rachel Kelsall	2,069	51.3	
Labour	John Cunnison	1,328	32.9	
Labour	Lauren Davison	1,169	29.0	
Labour	Clare Stanier	1,063	26.4	
City Independents	Andrew George Gilbride	583	14.5	
Green	Debbie Patricia Georgakakou	574	14.2	
Turnout		4,031	28.3	
Rejected ballots		7	0.2	
Registered electors		14,258		
Conservative win (new seat)				
Conservative win (new seat)				
Conservative win (new seat)				

=== Hanley Park, Joiner's Square & Shelton ===
Hanley Park, Joiner's Square & Shelton (2 seats)
Party	Candidate	Votes	%	±%
Labour	Alastair Scott Watson	1,245	53.7	
Labour	Amjid Wazir	1,231	53.1	
Conservative	Murtaza Alam	754	32.5	
Independent	Alirom Raza	471	20.3	
Conservative	Raja Ravi Varma Sangaraju	454	19.6	
Turnout		2,317	26.9	
Rejected ballots		16	0.7	
Registered electors		8,629		
Labour win (new seat)				
Labour win (new seat)				

=== Hartshill Park & Stoke ===
Hartshill Park & Stoke
Party	Candidate	Votes	%	±%
Labour	Daniela Maria Santoro	630	68.2	
Conservative	Nathan Andrew Purchase	242	26.2	
Independent	David Edward Barker	52	5.6	
Majority		388	42.0	
Turnout		933	25.1	
Rejected ballots		9	1.0	
Registered electors		3,712		
Labour win (new seat)				

=== Hollybush ===
Hollybush
Party	Candidate	Votes	%	±%
Labour Co-op	Finlay Gordon-McCusker	631	55.3	
Conservative	Shaun Bennett	393	34.4	
City Independents	Michelle Francis Whalley	118	10.4	
Majority		238	20.9	
Turnout		933	25.1	
Rejected ballots		4	0.3	
Registered electors		3,712		
Labour Co-op win (new seat)				

=== Lightwood North & Normacot ===
Lightwood North & Normacot
Party	Candidate	Votes	%	±%
Conservative	Sadaqat Maqsoom	1,288	57.0	–2.0
Labour	Omar Ali	970	43.0	+2.0
Majority		318	14.0	–4.0
Turnout		2,275	48.5	–13.2
Rejected ballots		17	0.7	
Registered electors		4,695		
Conservative hold		Swing	▼2.0	

=== Little Chell & Stanfield ===
David Williams (Stoke-on-Trent North MP)

Little Chell & Stanfield
Party	Candidate	Votes	%	±%
Labour	David Williams	676	57.3	+11.9
Conservative	Imran Khurshid	335	28.4	+22.1
Independent	Anthony Screen	168	14.3	N/A
Majority		341	28.9	+19.4
Turnout		1,181	26.5	–0.7
Rejected ballots		2	0.2	
Registered electors		4,461		
Labour hold		Swing	▼5.1	

=== Longton & Meir Hay South ===
Longton & Meir Hay South
Party	Candidate	Votes	%	±%
Labour	Chris Robinson	684	55.4	
Conservative	Asman Ali	549	44.6	
Majority		135	10.8	
Turnout		1,245	27.1	
Rejected ballots		12	1.0	
Registered electors		4,600		
Labour win (new seat)				

=== Meir Hay North, Parkhall & Weston Coyney ===
Meir Hay North, Parkhall & Weston Coyney (2 seats)
Party	Candidate	Votes	%	±%
Conservative	Craig David Beardmore	1,409	58.9	
Conservative	Ross Andrew Irving	1,293	54.0	
Labour	Samantha Yates	942	39.4	
Labour	Zain Albadeen Mohammed	730	30.5	
Turnout		2,393	24.3	
Rejected ballots		20	0.8	
Registered electors		9,831		
Conservative win (new seat)				
Conservative win (new seat)				

=== Meir North ===
Meir North
Party	Candidate	Votes	%	±%
Labour	Desiree Gail Elliott	485	52.3	+26.7
City Independents	Michelle Suzanne Swift	279	30.1	+12.8
Conservative	Sam Hussain	164	17.7	–0.7
Majority		206	22.2	+19.1
Turnout		938	19.0	–3.5
Rejected ballots		10	1.1	
Registered electors		4,946		
Labour hold		Swing	▲7.0	

=== Meir Park ===
Meir Park
Party	Candidate	Votes	%	±%
Conservative	Abi Brown	982	73.5	–10.9
Labour	Taimour Arfan	260	19.5	+3.9
Green	Jenny Louise Harper	95	7.1	N/A
Majority		722	54.0	–14.8
Turnout		1,340	33.1	–3.8
Rejected ballots		3	0.2	
Registered electors		4,044		
Conservative hold		Swing	▼7.4	

=== Meir South ===
Meir South
Party	Candidate	Votes	%	±%
Conservative	Faisal Hussain	684	52.5	+12.8
Labour	Bagh Ali	618	47.5	+15.5
Majority		66	5.0	–2.7
Turnout		1,306	29.4	+2.3
Rejected ballots		4	0.3	
Registered electors		4,444		
Conservative hold		Swing	▼1.4	

=== Moorcroft & Sneyd Green ===
Moorcroft & Sneyd Green (2 seats)
Party	Candidate	Votes	%	±%
Labour	Javid Iqbal Najmi	1,198	45.5	
Labour	Laura Anne Carter	1,157	43.9	
Conservative	Tariq Mahmood	787	29.9	
City Independents	Joanne Powell-Beckett	720	27.3	
City Independents	Kerry Ellis	555	21.1	
Conservative	Marilyn Anne Marathe	483	18.3	
Turnout		2,633	29.2	
Rejected ballots		9	0.3	
Registered electors		9,027		
Labour win (new seat)				
Labour win (new seat)				

=== Penkhull & Springfields ===
Penkhull & Springfields
Party	Candidate	Votes	%	±%
Labour	Sarah Ann Hill	719	55.9	
Conservative	Dean Richardson	478	37.1	
Green	Tom Holland	90	7.0	
Majority		241	18.8	
Turnout		1,301	30.2	
Rejected ballots		14	1.1	
Registered electors		4,303		
Labour win (new seat)				

=== Sandford Hill ===
Sandford Hill
Party	Candidate	Votes	%	±%
Labour	Joan Bell	615	59.0	+18.4
Conservative	Ally Simcock	428	41.0	+3.3
Majority		187	18.0	+15.1
Turnout		1,055	22.8	–2.9
Rejected ballots		12	1.1	
Registered electors		4,622		
Labour hold		Swing	▲7.6	

=== Trent Vale & Oakhill ===
Trent Vale & Oakhill
Party	Candidate	Votes	%	±%
Labour Co-op	Waseem Akbar	592	52.7	
Independent	Jackie Barnes	400	35.6	
Independent	Bridge Allport	131	11.7	
Majority		192	17.1	
Turnout		1,128	27.0	
Registered electors		4,175		
Rejected ballots		5	0.4	
Labour Co-op win (new seat)				

=== Tunstall ===
Tunstall
Party	Candidate	Votes	%	±%
Conservative	Tabrase Din	650	45.8	+35.5
Labour Co-op	Joy Garner	392	27.6	–15.0
Independent	Lee Wanger	377	26.6	N/A
Majority		258	18.2	N/A
Turnout		1,430	28.7	
Rejected ballots		11	0.8	
Registered electors		4,982		
Conservative gain from City Independents		Swing	▲25.3	

== By-elections ==
=== Meir North ===
A by-election was held on 2 May 2024 following the resignation of Labour councillor Desiree Elliott, who had served as cabinet member for education, skills and anti-poverty.

Meir North by-election 2 May 2024
Party	Candidate	Votes	%	±%
Labour	Lauren Davison	469	53.9	N/A
Independent	Michelle Suzanne Swift	216	24.8	N/A
Conservative	Khawar Ali	185	21.3	N/A
Majority		253	29.1	N/A
Turnout		877	17.6	N/A
Rejected ballots		7	0.8	
Registered electors		4,979		
Labour hold				

=== Birches Head & Northwood ===
A by-election was held on 15 May 2025 after Labour councillor Steve Blakemore was disqualified from office when Unitas, the council's housing repairs company which employed him, was brought back under direct council control on 1 April 2025, creating a conflict under the rules barring council employees from serving as councillors.

Birches Head & Northwood by-election 15 May 2025
Party	Candidate	Votes	%	±%
Reform	Luke Stephen Shenton	1,226	58.5	N/A
Labour	Maggie Bradley	449	21.4	–22.5
City Independents	Jean Ann Bowers	346	16.5	–15.3
Conservative	Kharwar Ali	73	3.5	–16.3
Majority		777	37.1	N/A
Turnout		2,094	28.1	+2.6
Reform gain from Labour				
