= City Independents =

Political party in England

The City Independents are a political party based in Stoke-on-Trent, England. Formed in 2004, they regularly stand candidates for election to Stoke-on-Trent City Council.

Following the results of the 2015 election, the City Independents formed an administration with the support of the Conservatives and UKIP, with City Independents leader, Ann James, becoming Leader of the council. In the aftermath of the 2019 election, the City Independents would form a second administration with the Conservatives, this time as a junior partner, with Ann James moving to Deputy Leader of the council.

The second administration continued until September 2020, when it collapsed following a cabinet shuffle that saw the remaining two City Independent cabinet members removed from their posts. The group's remaining 6 councillors then sat in opposition to the minority Conservative administration.

In the 2023 elections, the group lost five of the six seats with only Lilian Dodd retaining her seat.
