= Stoke-on-Trent City Council =

Local authority of Stoke-on-Trent, England

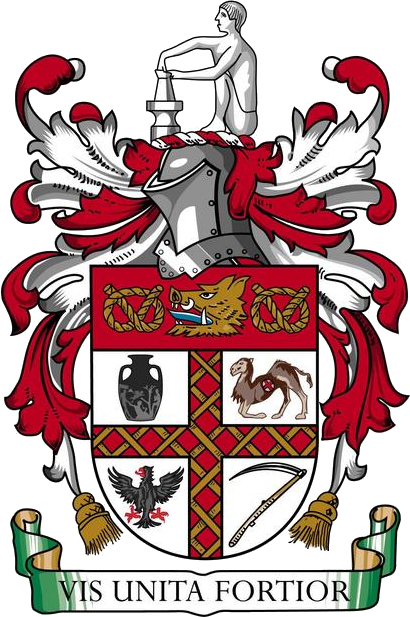

Type
- Type: Unitary authority

Leadership
- Lord Mayor: Joan Bell, Labour since 21 May 2026
- Leader: Jane Ashworth, Labour since 25 May 2023
- Chief Executive: Jon Rouse since February 2020

Structure
- Seats: 44 councillors
- Graph of the party split among 44 seats.
- Political groups: Administration (27) Labour (27) Other parties (17) Conservative (8) Reform (5) City Independents (1) Potteries Party (1) Independent (2)
- Length of term: Whole council elected every four years

Elections
- Voting system: Plurality-at-large
- Last election: 4 May 2023
- Next election: 6 May 2027

Meeting place
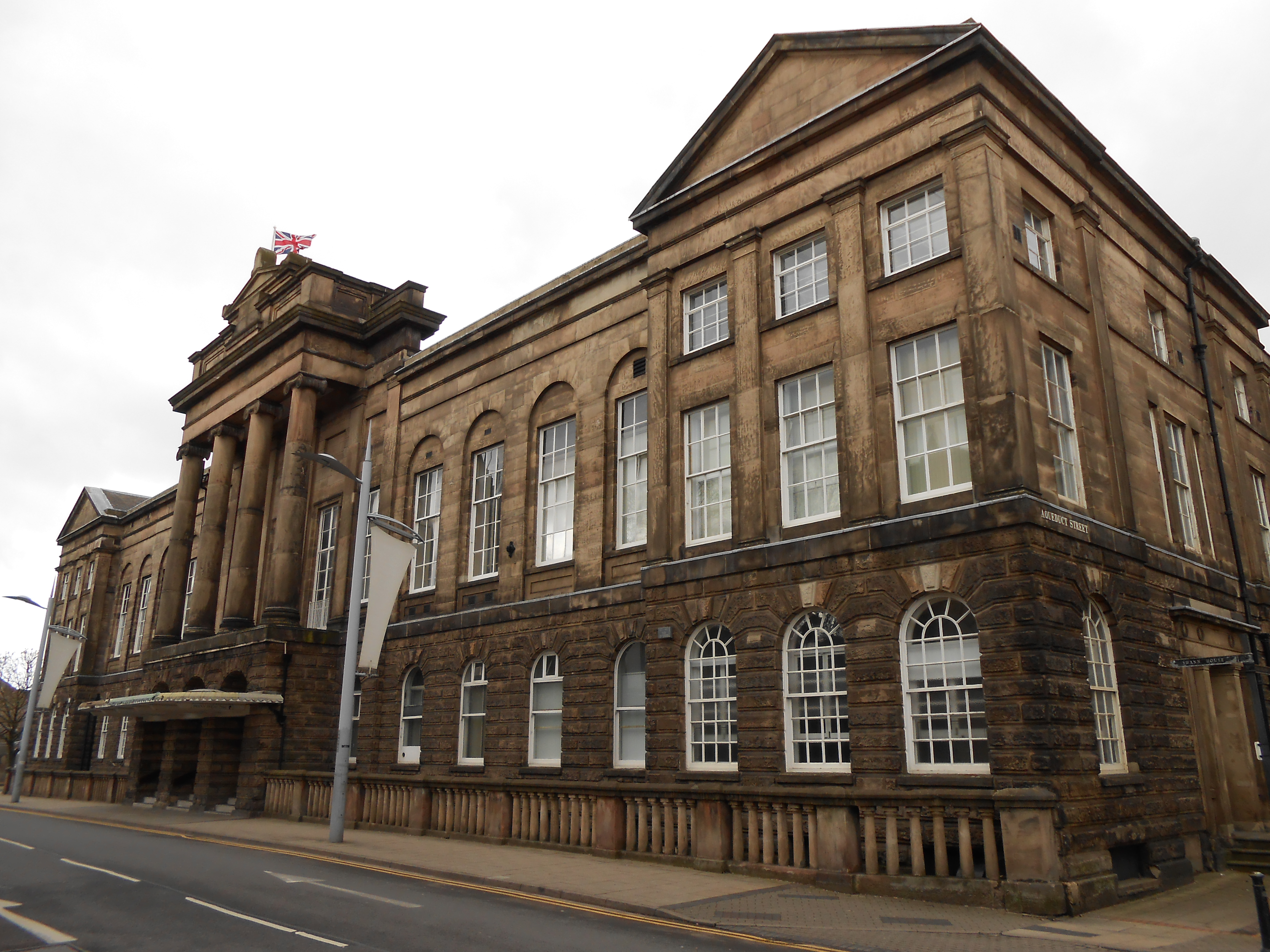
- Town Hall and Civic Centre, Glebe Street, Stoke-on-Trent, ST4 1HH

Website
- stoke.gov.uk

Stoke-on-Trent City Council is the local authority of Stoke-on-Trent, Staffordshire, England. Since 1997 it has been a unitary authority, being a district council which also performs the functions of a county council. It is independent from Staffordshire County Council.

The council has been under Labour majority control since 2023. It meets at Stoke-upon-Trent Town Hall. Its main offices are divided between the Civic Centre adjoining the town hall and One Smithfield in Hanley.

== History ==
A Stoke-upon-Trent Borough Council was established in 1874 when the town was made a municipal borough. On the federation of Stoke-on-Trent in 1910, it merged with the five neighbouring towns of Burslem, Fenton, Hanley, Longton and Tunstall and became a county borough. The borough was awarded city status on 5 June 1925, and the council has therefore been a city council since then. In 1928 the city council was granted the right to appoint a lord mayor.

In 1974 the city lost its county borough status under the Local Government Act 1972. It kept the same boundaries, but was redesignated as a lower-tier district council, with Staffordshire County Council providing county-level functions in the area.

The city council regained its independence from the county council in 1997 when it was made a unitary authority. The way this change was implemented was to create a new non-metropolitan county of Stoke-on-Trent covering the same area as the district, but with no separate county council; instead, the existing city council took on county council functions. This therefore had the effect of restoring the council to the powers it had held before 1974 when Stoke-on-Trent was a county borough. Stoke-on-Trent remains part of Staffordshire for the ceremonial purposes of lieutenancy and shrievalty.

In 2002 the council adopted a new form of executive arrangements, having a directly-elected mayor and a council manager, one of three possible options outlined in the Local Government Act 2000. Stoke was the only council in the country to adopt this option. A 2008 report by the Stoke-on-Trent Governance Commission to the Secretary of State for Local Government was highly critical of the political system then in use in the city. In response, the directly-elected mayor position was abolished in 2009, and there were changes to the electoral map in May 2011. From a council of 60 members representing 20 wards with three councillors each, the size of the council was reduced to 44 councillors representing 37 wards (31 single member wards, five two-member wards and one three-member ward).

Further electoral changes came into effect with the Stoke-on-Trent (Electoral Changes) Order 2022. The council continues to comprise 44 councillors, with the city now divided into 34 wards: 26 single-member wards, six two-member wards, and two three-member wards.

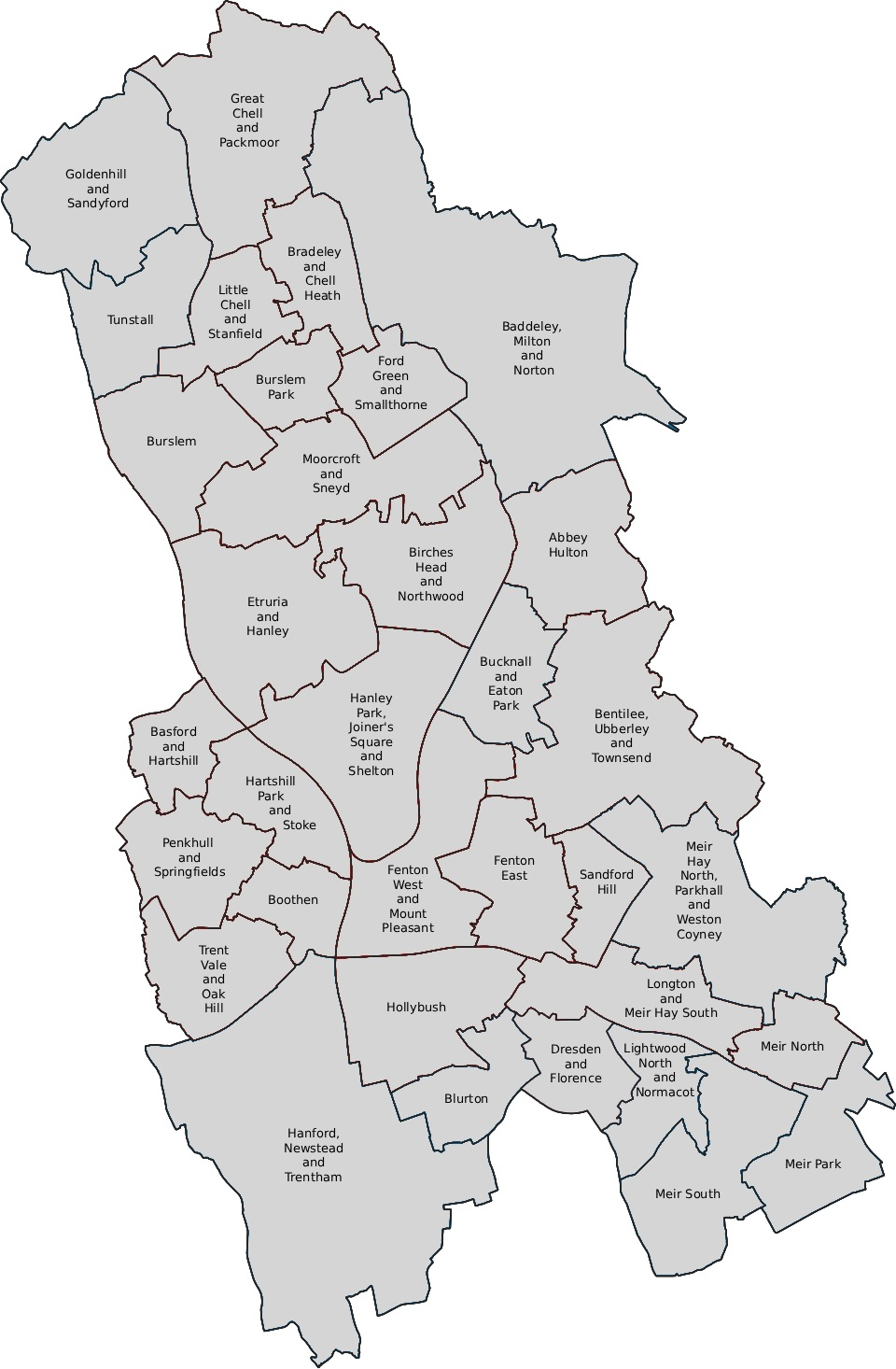
Simplified map of Stoke-on-Trent council wards following the 2022 Order (effective from the 2023 elections)

== Governance ==
As a unitary authority, Stoke-on-Trent City Council has the functions of a county council and district council combined. In its capacity as a district council it is a billing authority collecting Council Tax and business rates, it processes local planning applications, it is responsible for housing, waste collection and environmental health. In its capacity as a county council it is a local education authority, responsible for social services, libraries and waste disposal. There are no civil parishes in Stoke, which has been an unparished area since the reforms of 1974.

=== Political control ===
The council has been under Labour majority control since the 2023 election.

Political control of the council since the 1974 reforms has been as follows:

Non-metropolitan district

Party in control	Years
Labour	1974–1997

Unitary authority

Party in control	Years
Labour	1997–2002
No overall control	2002–2004
Labour	2004–2006
No overall control	2006–2011
Labour	2011–2015
No overall control	2015–2023
Labour	2023–present

=== Leadership ===
The role of Lord Mayor of Stoke-on-Trent is largely ceremonial. Before 2002, political leadership was provided by the leader of the council. From 2002 to 2009, the city council had a directly elected Mayor of Stoke-on-Trent who acted as political leader. Since the abolition of the directly elected mayor position in 2009, the council has again appointed a leader of the council.

The leaders from 1960 to 2002 were:

Councillor	Party	From	To
Albert Bennett	Labour	1960	6 Jul 1972
Jim Westwood	Labour	Jul 1972	May 1976
Arthur Cholerton	Labour	May 1976	May 1981
Ron Southern	Labour	May 1981	May 1990
Ted Smith	Labour	May 1990	1997
Barry Stockley	Labour	1997	2002
Geoff Davies	Independent	2002	2002

The directly elected mayors were: (Note: Mayoral terms of office ran from the fourth day after polling day.)

Mayor	Party	From	To
Mike Wolfe	Independent	21 Oct 2002	8 May 2005
Mark Meredith	Labour	9 May 2005	5 Jun 2009

The leaders since 2009 have been:

Councillor	Party	From	To
Ross Irving	Conservative	5 Jun 2009	May 2010
Mohammed Pervez	Labour	27 May 2010	May 2015
Dave Conway	Independent	28 May 2015	17 May 2018
Ann James	Independent	17 May 2018	May 2019
Abi Brown	Conservative	23 May 2019	May 2023
Jane Ashworth	Labour	25 May 2023	

=== Composition ===
Following the 2023 election, and subsequent by-elections and changes of allegiance up to September 2026, the composition of the council was:

Party	Seats
Labour	27
Conservative	8
Reform	5
City Independents	1
Potteries Party	1
Independent	2
Total	44

== Elections ==
Since the last boundary changes in 2023 the council has comprised 44 councillors representing 34 wards, with each ward electing one, two or three councillors. Elections are held every four years.

== Premises ==
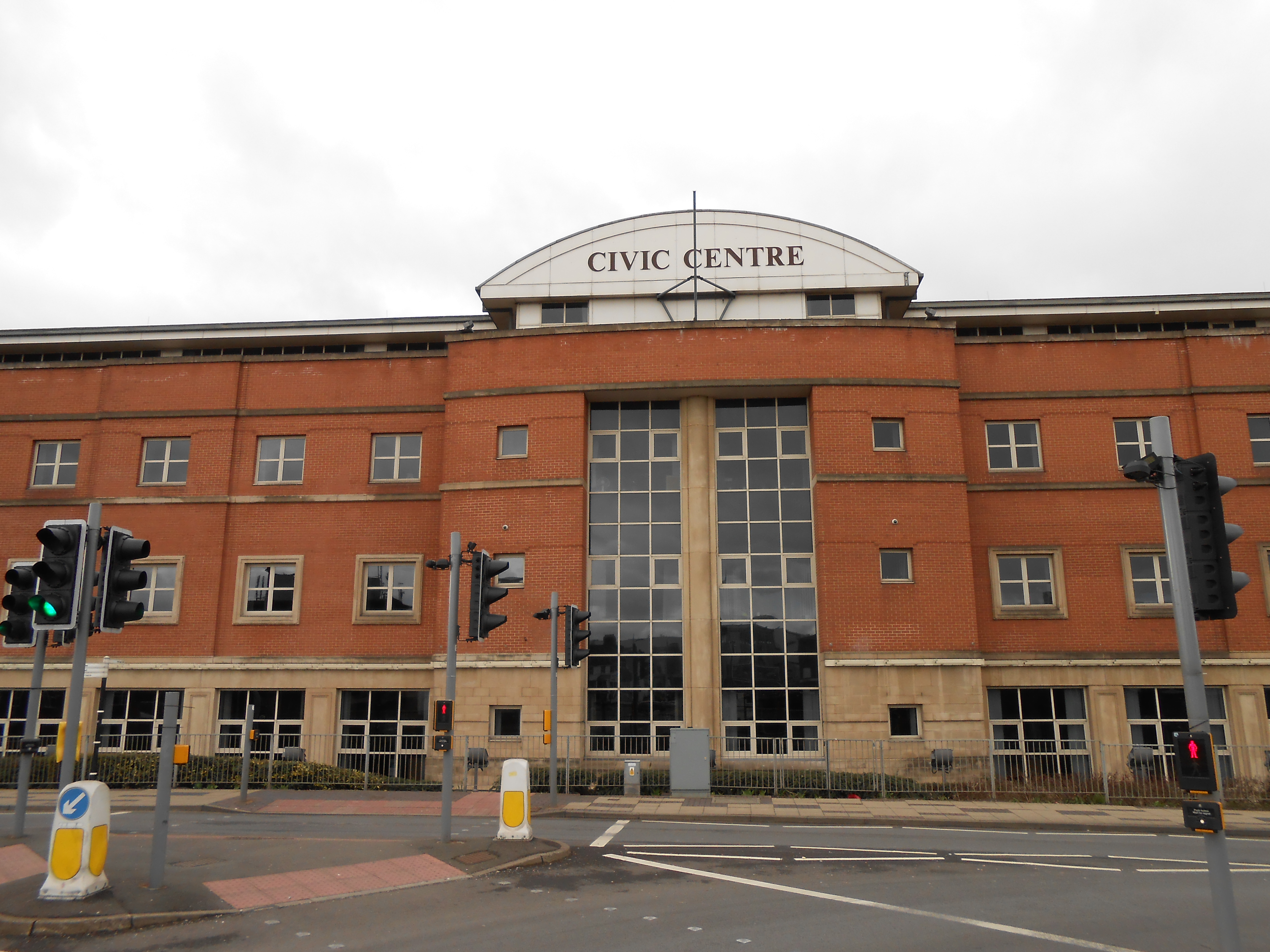
Civic Centre: 1992 building

The council meets and has its headquarters at the Civic Centre on Glebe Street, a complex of buildings which incorporates both the Stoke-upon-Trent Town Hall of 1834 (which contains the council chamber) and a large extension to the north-east built in 1992.

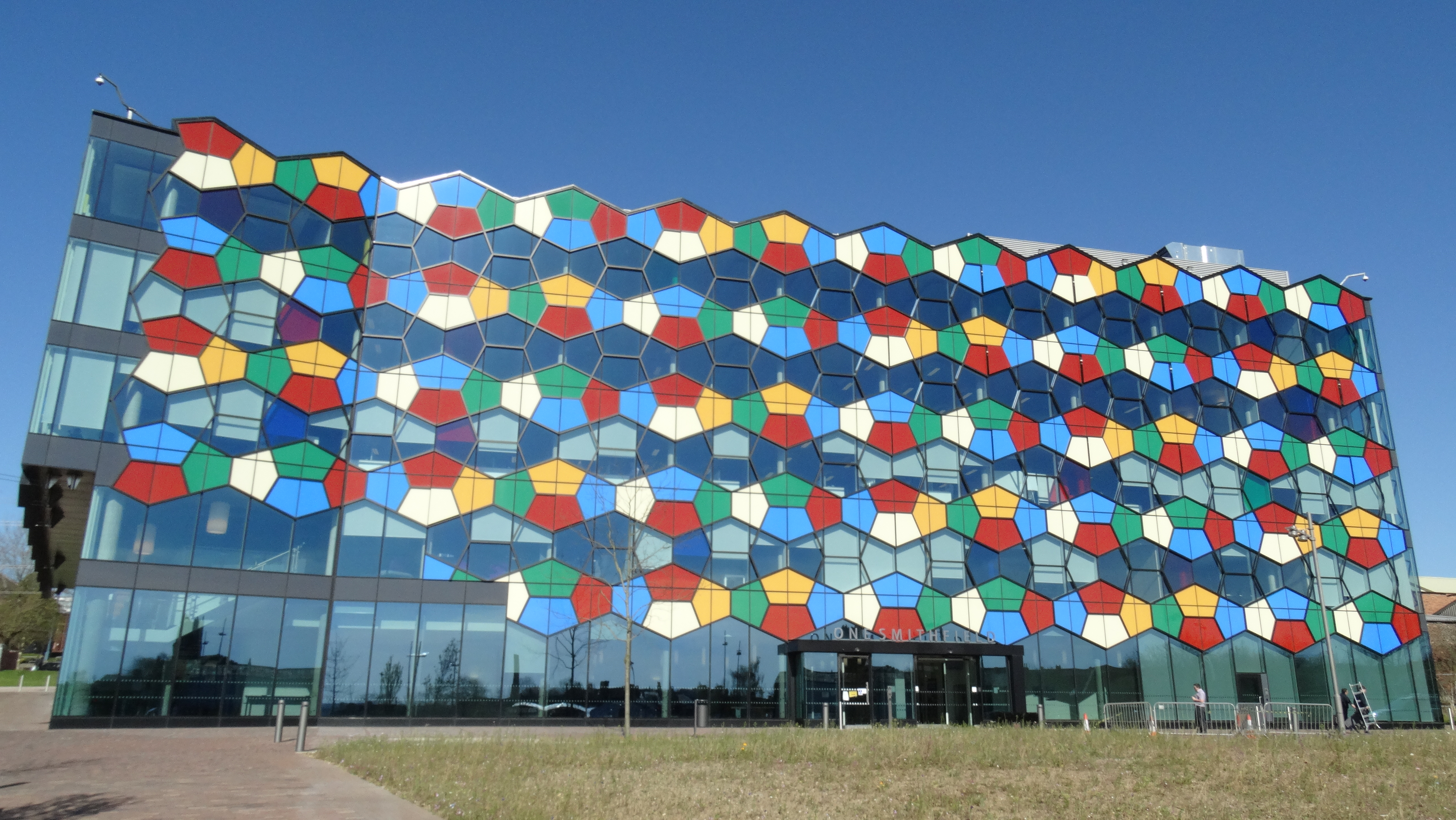
One Smithfield, Hanley

The council has additional offices in a modern building at One Smithfield in Hanley. When the new building was commissioned it was envisaged that it would replace the Civic Centre, but whilst the building was being built in 2013 it was decided to retain the Civic Centre after all.

== In the media ==
In 2014, Paul Shotton, then deputy council leader, was reported to have "frequently" used false names to contact BBC Radio Stoke to praise the council's and his own work. This resulted in his suspension by the Labour party and the "loss of senior council roles". In 2014, Private Eye magazine awarded Shotton the "Rotten Boroughs award" for media manipulation.
