= Union =

Union commonly refers to:

- Trade union, an organization of workers
- Tenants union, an organization of renters
- Union (set theory), in mathematics, a fundamental operation on sets

Union may also refer to:

== Arts and entertainment ==
=== Music ===
- Union (band), an American rock group
  - Union (Union album), 1998
- Union (Chara album), 2007
- Union (Toni Childs album), 1988
- Union (Cuff the Duke album), 2012
- Union (Paradoxical Frog album), 2011
- Union, a 2001 album by Puya
- Union, a 2001 album by Rasa
- Union (Son Volt album), 2019
- Union (The Boxer Rebellion album), 2009
- Union (Yes album), 1991
- "Union" (Black Eyed Peas song), 2005

=== Other uses in arts and entertainment ===
- Union (film), a labor documentary released in 2024
- Union (Star Wars), a Dark Horse comics limited series
- Union, in the fictional Alliance–Union universe of C. J. Cherryh
- Union (Horse with Two Discs), a bronze sculpture by Christopher Le Brun, 1999–2000
- The Union (Marvel Team), a Marvel Comics superhero team and comic series

== Education ==
- Union Academy (disambiguation)
- Union College (disambiguation)
- Union Institute & University, Cincinnati, Ohio, US
- Union Presbyterian Seminary, Richmond, Virginia, US
- Union Public Schools, a school district in Oklahoma, US
- Union School of Theology, Brigend, Wales
- Union Theological College, Belfast, Northern Ireland
- Union Theological Seminary (disambiguation)
- Union University (disambiguation)

== History and politics ==
- Economic union, a type of trade bloc
- Political union, a type of state which is composed of or created out of smaller states
- Personal union, the combination of two or more states that have the same monarch
- Poor law union, a former unit of local government in the UK
- Real union, a union of two or more states, which share some state institutions
- CDU/CSU, or the Union, a German political alliance
- Union (American Civil War), U.S. states that were loyal to the U.S. federal government
- Union army, the U.S. federal government's army in the American Civil War
- Union (Hungarian-German trade union council)
- Union (Madagascar), a political party
- Union Party (disambiguation)

== Places ==
=== Canada ===
- Union, Nova Scotia
- Union, Elgin County, Ontario
- Union, Leeds and Grenville United Counties, Ontario
- Union, Prince Edward Island

=== United States ===
- Union, Alabama
- Union, Connecticut
- Union, Illinois
- Union, Logan County, Illinois
- Union, Indiana
- Union, Iowa
- Union, Kentucky
- Union, Louisiana
- Union Parish, Louisiana
- Union, Maine
- Union, Mississippi
- Union, Missouri, in Franklin County
- Union, Clark County, Missouri
- Union, Nebraska
- Union, New Hampshire
- Union (CDP), New Jersey
- Union (hamlet), New York
- Union, New York
- Union, Ohio, a city
- Union, Oregon
- Union, Pennsylvania (disambiguation)
- Union, South Carolina
- Union, Texas
- Union, Virginia
- Union, Washington
- Union, West Virginia
- Union, Barbour County, West Virginia
- Union, Wisconsin (disambiguation)
- Union County (disambiguation)
- Union Township (disambiguation)
- Arcata, California, first settled as Union
- Mount Union (Arizona), a mountain

=== Elsewhere ===
- Union, Grenada
- Unión, Paraguay
- Union, Bohol, Philippines
- Union, Dapa, Philippines
- Union Island, Saint Vincent and the Grenadines

== Science and mathematics ==
- Union (set theory), in mathematics, a fundamental operation on sets
- Union (SQL), a set operation
- Union type, in computer science, a type of data structure

== Sports ==
- 1. FC Union Berlin, a German association football club
- Chicago Unions, a professional, Black baseball team that played in the US in the late 19th century, prior to the formation of the Negro leagues
- Philadelphia Union, an American soccer club
- Royale Union Saint-Gilloise, a Belgian association football club
- Shaanxi Union F.C., a Chinese association football club
- Union Brescia, an Italian association football club
- Unión de Santa Fe, an Argentinian sports club
- Union Race Course, formerly in San Francisco, US

== Transportation ==
- Union Station (disambiguation)
- List of ships named Union
- Union (automobile), made by the Union Automobile Company 1902–1905

== Other uses ==
- Union (plumbing), a pipe fitting
- Union (towers), a co-living development in Manchester, England
- Union (United States coin), a proposed $100 coin
- Gabrielle Union (born 1972), an American actress
- Civil union, a legal personal relationship
- Students' union

== See also ==
- The Union (disambiguation)
- L'Union (disambiguation)
- Union Bank (disambiguation)
- Union City (disambiguation)
- Union State, of Russia and Belarus
- Chicago Union Giants (disambiguation), several former American baseball teams in the Negro leagues
