= L'Union (disambiguation) =

L'Union is a commune in southwestern France.

L'Union may also refer to:

- L'Union (American newspaper), American newspaper published from 1862 to 1864
- L'Union (French newspaper), French newspaper published since 1944
- L'Union (Gabonese newspaper), Gabonese daily newspaper published since 1973
- L'Union, French newspaper title from 1848, after merger of La Quotidienne with two other titles

== See also ==
- Union (disambiguation)
- The Union (disambiguation)
