= ICBC Argentina =

Argentine financial services company

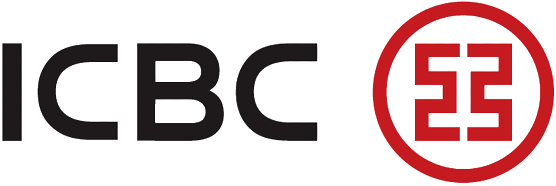

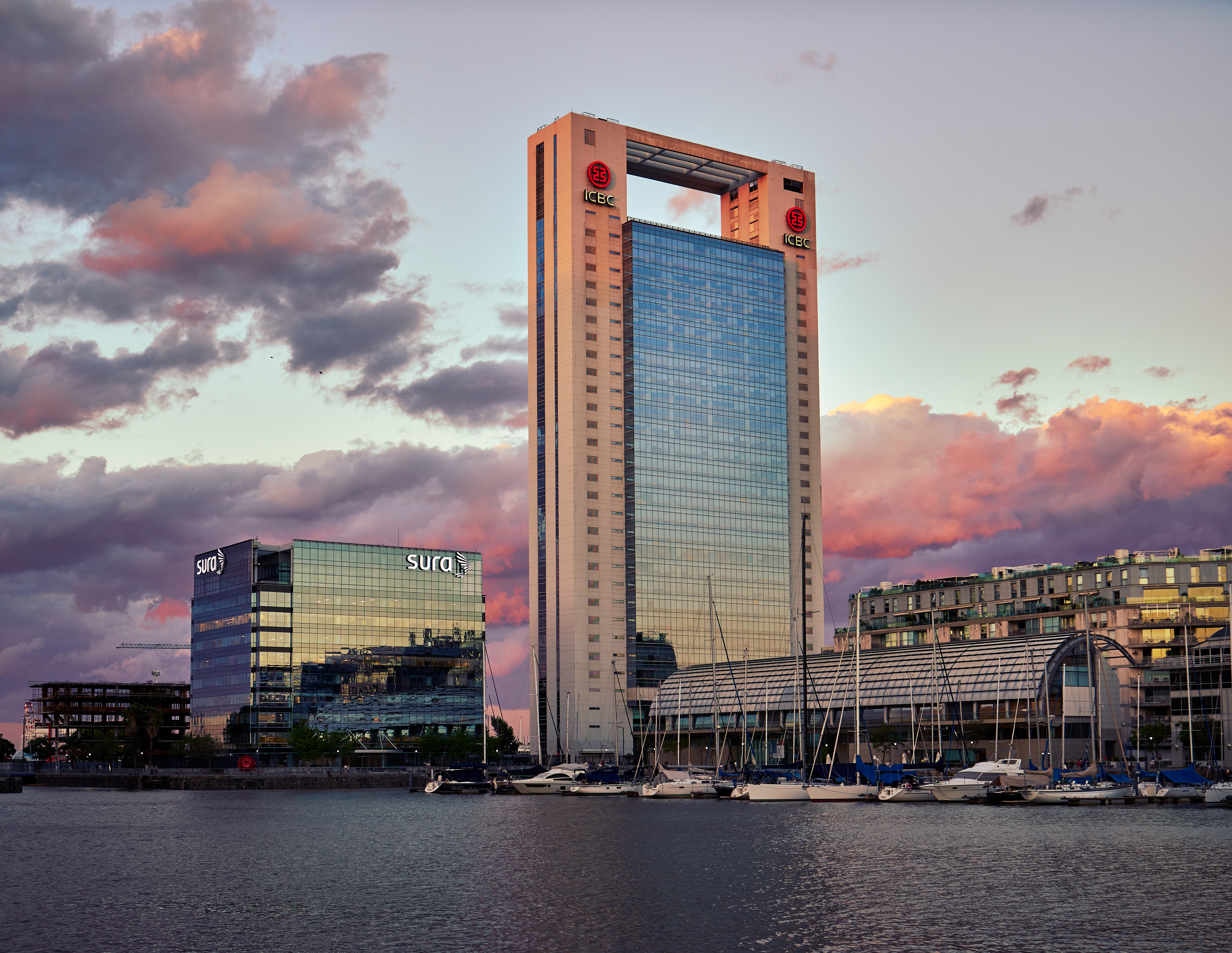
- Native name: Industrial and Commercial Bank of China
- Founded: 2013
- Headquarters: Florida 99, Buenos Aires, Argentina
- Number of locations: Domestic: 624 branches; Overseas: 15 branches
- Area served: Argentina
- Key people: Zhang Junguo, (President); Andrés Lozano, (General manager)
- Services: Retail Banking; Business finance; Trade finance; Factoring; Mutual funds; Pension funds; Insurance; Mortgage loans; Consumer Finance; Credit cards
- Revenue: ▲US$ 5.1 billion (2010–2011)
- Net income: ▲US$ 1.1 billion (2010–2011)
- Total assets: ▲US$ 36.7 billion (2011)
- Number of employees: 16,519 (2011)
- Parent: ICBC Limited
- Website: www.icbc.com.ar

ICBC Argentina is an Argentine banking entity owned by ICBC. It is the Argentine subsidiary of the Chinese bank Industrial and Commercial Bank of China, founded in 2013 after the purchase of Standard Bank Argentina.

== History ==
In 2006, Standard Bank purchased the BankBoston Argentina unit, expanding its operations to this country. In 2012, ICBC acquired 80% of its shares. The rebranding occurred in April 2013.

With an extensive network of more than 103 branches spread across 17 provinces and a team of 3,243 employees, ICBC stands out as a solid financial institution in the country. Its asset base exceeds 21.1 billion pesos (ARS), backed by deposits exceeding 15.2 billion pesos. This consolidates its position among the main private banks in Argentina, ranking among the eight most prominent in terms of assets and deposits.
