= Union Bank =

Union Bank or Unionbank may refer to:

- Unionbank (Austria), an Austrian bank active created in 1870, merged into Allgemeine Bodencreditanstalt in 1927
- Union Bank (Albania)
- Union Bank of Australia, became part of Australia and New Zealand Banking Group
- Union Bank Limited (Bangladesh)
- Union Bank of California, now named MUFG Union Bank
- Union Bank of Halifax, Nova Scotia
- Union Bank of Hong Kong, now named Industrial and Commercial Bank of China (Asia)
- Union Bank of India
- Union Bank of Israel
- Union Bank (Jordan), a bank in the Arab world
- Union Bank of London, later National Provincial Bank
- Union Bank (Morrisville, Vermont)
- Union Bank of New London, earliest predecessor of failed Bank of New England (Massachusetts)
- Union Bank of Nigeria
- Union Bank of Norway, branded as Sparebanken NOR
- UnionBank (Philippines), a Philippine bank created in 1968
- Union Bank (Pakistan)
- Union Bank (Pembrokeshire), England
- Union Bank of Scotland, now part of Bank of Scotland
- Union Bank of Switzerland
- Union Bank (Tallahassee, Florida)
- Union Bank of Taiwan
- Union Bank & Trust Company of Nebraska
- Unionbank or MKB Unionbank, a Bulgarian bank from 1996 to 2014
- MUFG Union Bank, mainly operating on U.S. west coast

== See also ==
- Union Banks, large drowned atoll in South China Sea
- Union Bank F.C., Nigerian association football club
- Union Banking Corporation
- The Union Bank (1828), India
- Union Bank Building (disambiguation)
- Union Commercial Bank
- Union State Bank (disambiguation)
- The Bank of Union, acquired by BancFirst January 24, 2014
