= Union Theological Seminary (disambiguation) =

Union Theological Seminary is a Christian seminary in New York that is affiliated with Columbia University.

Union Theological Seminary may also refer to:

- Guangdong Union Theological Seminary, a Protestant seminary in Guangzhou, Guangdong, China
- Nanjing Union Theological Seminary, a Protestant seminary in Jiangsu, China
- Tokyo Union Theological Seminary, a Protestant seminary in Japan
- Union Presbyterian Seminary or Union Theological Seminary in Virginia and Presbyterian School of Christian Education, in Richmond, Virginia, and Charlotte, North Carolina
- Union Theological Seminary (Philippines), a Protestant seminary in Dasmariñas, Cavite, Philippines

== See also ==
- Albright College, formerly known as Union Seminary, a college in Reading, Pennsylvania
- Catholic Theological Union, a graduate institution in Chicago.
- Union Biblical Seminary in Pune, India
- Union School of Theology, Wales
- United Theological Seminary in Dayton, Ohio, affiliated with the United Methodist Church
- United Theological Seminary of the Twin Cities in New Brighton, Minnesota, affiliated with the United Church of Christ
- Unification Theological Seminary in Barrytown, New York, affiliated with the Unification Church
- Union College (disambiguation)
- Union Theological College, Belfast
- Union University (disambiguation)
