= Industrial and Commercial Bank of China (Asia) =

Hong Kong licensed bank

Industrial and Commercial Bank of China (Asia) 中國工商銀行（亞洲）
- Type: Private (1964–1973); Public (1973–2010); Private (since 2010)
- Industry: Banking; Financial services Investment services
- Founded: 1964; 62 years ago
- Headquarters: 3 Garden Road, Central, Hong Kong
- Area served: Hong Kong
- Products: Banking
- Services: consumer banking, commercial banking, treasury, bonds
- Website: icbcasia.com

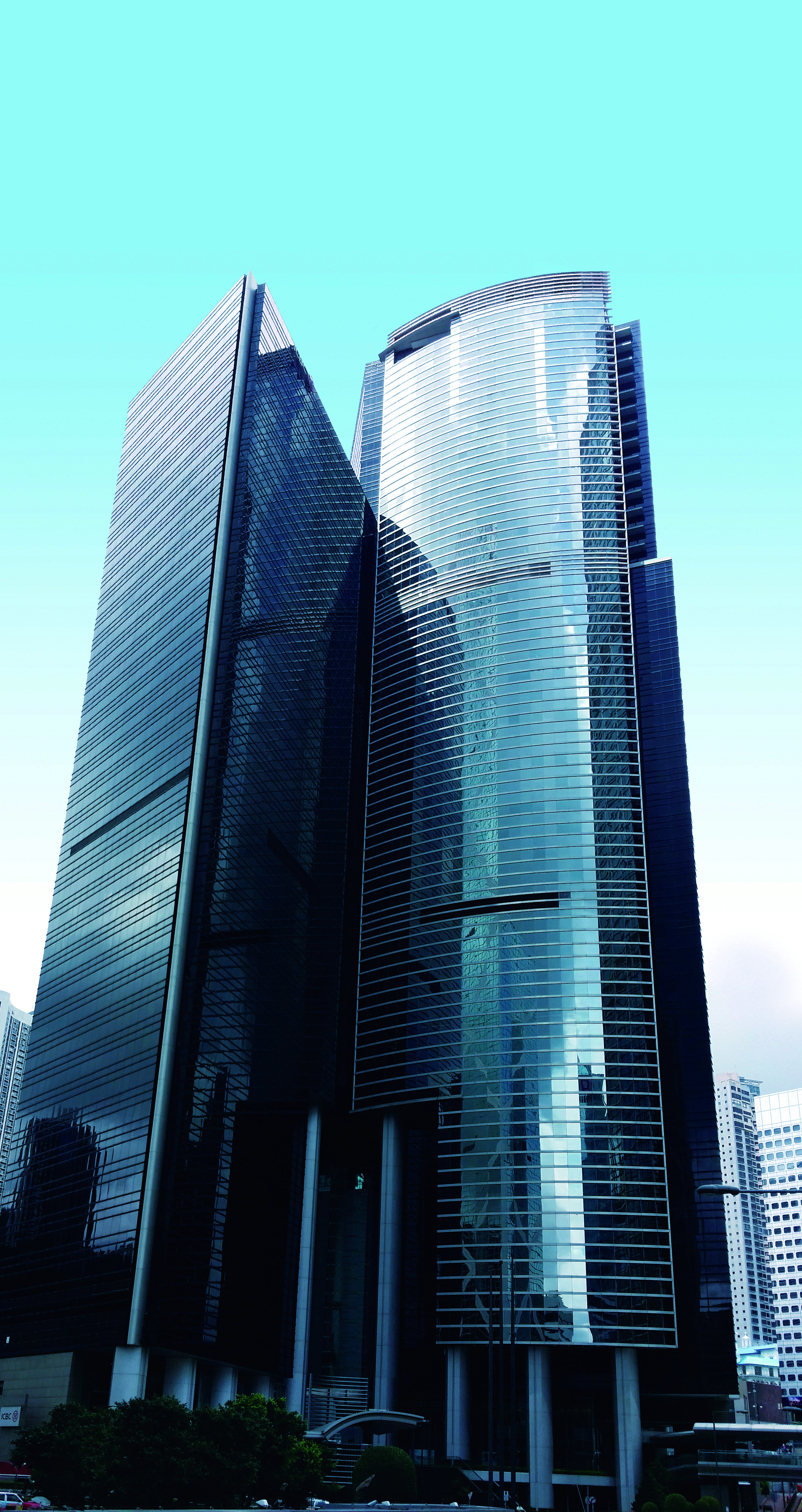
ICBC Tower (Left)

The Industrial and Commercial Bank of China (Asia) (abbreviated as ICBC (Asia), Chinese: 中國工商銀行（亞洲）) is a licensed bank incorporated in Hong Kong. It is a subsidiary of the Industrial and Commercial Bank of China.

== History ==
On 21 August 2000, ICBC acquired the Union Bank of Hong Kong, which was founded in Hong Kong in 1964 and traded on the Hong Kong Stock Exchange since 1973. The bank was renamed as ICBC (Asia) after the acquisition by ICBC in July 2001.

On 30 April 2004, ICBC (Asia) acquired the retail banking business (but not the wholesale banking business) of Fortis Bank Asia HK from Fortis. Fortis Bank Asia became a wholly owned subsidiary of ICBC (Asia) and reverted to its earlier name, Belgian Bank. On 10 October 2005, all Belgian Bank's branches were rebranded as ICBC (Asia). This merger has resulted in ICBC (Asia) rising to the position of being the sixth largest bank on the Hong Kong Stock Exchange, from its former position of tenth.

In November 2010, the company said it had obtained shareholder approval to take the Hong Kong unit private. It is delisted from the Hong Kong Stock Exchange in December 2010.

== See also ==
- List of banks in Hong Kong
- Union Bank of Hong Kong
