= Industrial and Commercial Bank of China (Macau) =

Locally incorporated bank in Macau, China

The Industrial and Commercial Bank of China (Macau) Limited (Chinese: 中國工商銀行(澳門)股份有限公司) formerly known as the Seng Heng Bank Limited (Chinese: 誠興銀行) established in 2009, is the third largest locally incorporated bank in Macau, China. In August 2007, Industrial and Commercial Bank of China (ICBC) acquired a 79.9 percent share in the bank, which became a subsidiary of ICBC. In July 2009, the merger was finalized and renamed ICBC (Macau) as such all branches of Seng Heng Bank are now re-branded as ICBC (Macau).

== History ==
The bank was acquired by Sociedade de Turismo e Diversoes de Macau S.A. in 1989, and is a wholly owned subsidiary. It was said to be the first bank in Greater China to offer a pre-paid debit card.
