= L'Union (Gabonese newspaper) =

Gabonese newspaper

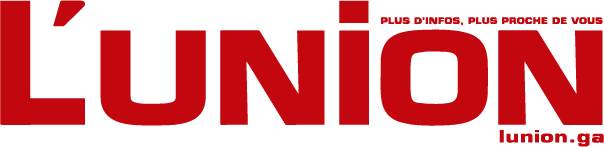
- Type: Daily newspaper
- Owner: Sonapresse
- Founder: Fred Hidalgo
- Editor-in-chief: Albert Yangari
- Founded: 1973; 53 years ago
- Language: French
- Headquarters: Libreville
- Country: Gabon
- Circulation: 25,000 (2024)
- Website: union.sonapresse.com

L'Union is the only national daily newspaper of Gabon. It has been described as Gabon's largest newspaper with a circulation of about 25,000 copies.

== History ==
L'Union is published by Sonapresse, a subsidiary of the company France Editions and Publications (Hachette Livre). It was founded in 1973 by Fred Hidalgo, who had previously worked as a cooperative member at the Gabonese Press Agency (1971–1972), and his wife Mauricette Hidalgo, both responsible for its conception, creation, and publication.

Two “zero” issues were released:

- Issue 00 on 14 December 1973 (No. 00)
- Issue 0 on 7 January 1974

before the first official issue, dated 15 March 1974. Thereafter, L'Union was published weekly and distributed throughout the country. A small editorial team was gradually formed, with Michel Ekekang as director. Between 15 March 1974 and 23 December 1975, 93 issues were published. After on-the-job training of a team of young journalists and the construction of a proper press printing facility, the weekly was turned into a daily newspaper on 30 December 1975.

Albert Yangari was soon appointed editor-in-chief, replacing Michel Ekekang, and later became general director. Fred Hidalgo (director of publishing until that date) and Mauricette Hidalgo (secretary general of the editorial staff) completed their mission and left Gabon at the end of the spring of 1976.

== Editorial line ==
The newspaper was considered very pro-government until the death of President Omar Bongo Odimba. During the 2009 Gabonese election campaign, it provided a more balanced coverage.

On 25 September 2009, the publication's director, Albert Yangari, was detained by military personnel following articles about post-electoral violence in Port-Gentil. The newspaper had reported that the number of victims could reach twenty-two people, contradicting the government's official report of three deaths.
