= Union, Wisconsin =

Union is the name of some places in the U.S. state of Wisconsin:

- Union, Burnett County, Wisconsin, a town
- Union, Door County, Wisconsin, a town
- Union, Eau Claire County, Wisconsin, a town
- Union (community), Eau Claire County, Wisconsin, an unincorporated community
- Union, Grant County, Wisconsin, an unincorporated community
- Union, Pierce County, Wisconsin, a town
- Union, Rock County, Wisconsin, a town
- Union (community), Rock County, Wisconsin, an unincorporated community
- Union, Vernon County, Wisconsin, a town
- Union, Waupaca County, Wisconsin, a town
