= The Union =

The Union may refer to:

== Politics ==
- The Union (Germany) or CDU/CSU, the partnership of the German political parties the Christian Democratic Union and the Christian Social Union
- The Union (Italy), a former coalition of political parties in Italy

== Political entities ==
- The European Union, a political and economic union of 27 member states primarily in Europe
- The Soviet Union, a federal socialist state that spanned much of Europe and Asia from 1922 to 1991
- The Indian Union, a federal parliamentary republic located in South Asia consisting of 28 states and 8 union territories
  - Union Government (India), government empowered by the constitution of India as the central legislative, executive, and judicial authority
- The United Kingdom, a country that includes Great Britain, Northern Ireland, and many islands within the British Isles
  - The Act of Union 1707, which united the kingdoms of England and Scotland into the Kingdom of Great Britain
  - The Act of Union 1800, which united the kingdoms of Great Britain and Ireland into the United Kingdom
- The United States, a country primarily located in North America comprising 50 states and several territories, districts, and possessions
  - Union (American Civil War), the federal government of the United States and the states loyal to it during the American Civil War (1861–1865)

== Film ==
- The Union (2011 film), a 2011 documentary film by Cameron Crowe
- The Union (2024 film), a 2024 film starring Mark Wahlberg and Halle Berry
- The Union: The Business Behind Getting High, a 2007 documentary about the Canadian marijuana industry
- A fictional company in the 2010 science fiction film Repo Men

== Books and newspapers ==
- The Union (James Bond), a fictional criminal organization in three Raymond Benson novels
- The Union (Marvel Team), a Marvel Comics UK superhero team and Marvel comic book series
- The Union (newspaper), a newspaper in Grass Valley, California, United States
- The Union or Ohio Enterprise, a newspaper for African Americans established in Cincinnati, Ohio by Wendell Dabney

== Music ==
- The Union (Elton John and Leon Russell album), 2010
- The Union (band), an English rock band formed in 2009
  - The Union (The Union album), their 2010 album
- The Union (The Glorious Sons album), a 2014 rock album
- The Union, a song from Jacobite Relics

== Other uses ==
- The Union (Victoria) a historic homestead in Woolsthorpe, Victoria, Australia.
- Cambridge Union, a debating and free speech society in Cambridge, England
- Oxford Union, a debating society in the city of Oxford, England, drawn primarily from the University of Oxford
- The Union (professional wrestling), a stable of wrestlers in the late 1990s
- International Union Against Tuberculosis and Lung Disease, a global scientific organization headquartered in Paris
- Informal neologism for a labour union

== See also ==
- Union (disambiguation)
- Acts of Union 1707, law creating the Kingdom of Great Britain
- Acts of Union 1801, law creating the United Kingdom of Great Britain and Ireland
- Perpetual Union, legal concept that binds the various U.S. states together as one nation
