= Union, Pennsylvania =

Union, Pennsylvania may refer to:

- Allenwood, Pennsylvania
- A village in Colerain Township, Lancaster County, Pennsylvania
- Union County, Pennsylvania
- Union Township, Washington County, Pennsylvania
