= Industrial and Commercial Bank of China =

State-owned bank in China

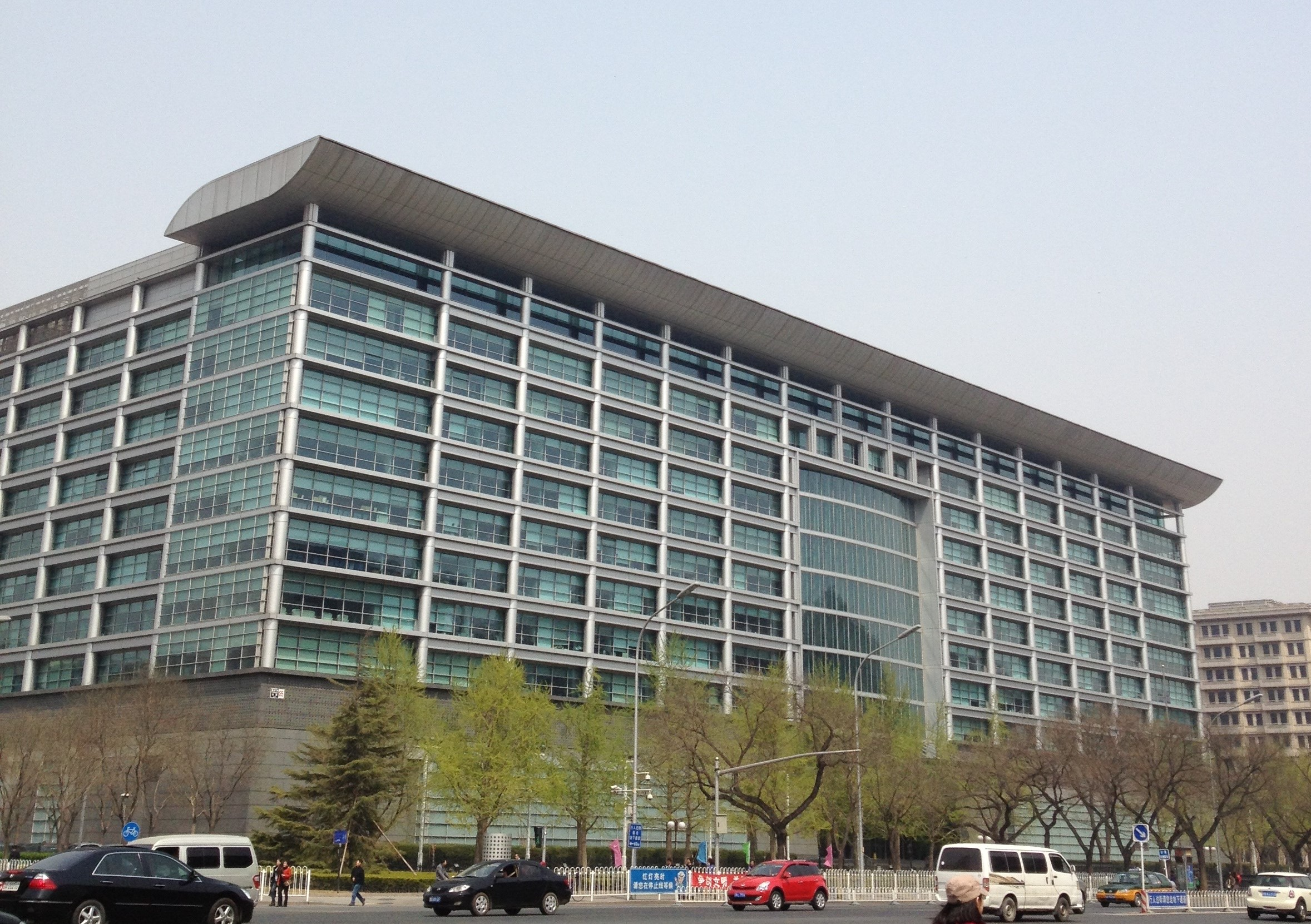
- ICBC head office in Beijing
- Native name: 中国工商银行; Zhōngguó Gōngshāng Yínháng
- Formerly: China United Saving Bank (CUSB)
- Type: Public; State-owned
- Traded as: SSE: 601398 (A ordinary); SEHK: 1398 (H ordinary); SSE: 360011 (CNY preference); SEHK: 84602 (CNH preference); SEHK: 4603 (US$ preference); SEHK: 4604 (€ preference); S&P Asia 50 component; Hang Seng Component; CSI A100
- ISIN: CNE1000003G1
- Industry: Financial services
- Founded: 4 January 1984; 42 years ago
- Headquarters: Beijing, China
- Key people: Liao Lin (chairman); Liu Jun (president)
- Products: Asset management; Banking; Commodities; Credit cards; Equities trading; Insurance; Investment management; Mortgage loans; Private equity; Wealth management
- Revenue: ▲CN¥801.4 billion (2025) (US$119.63 billion)
- Operating income: ▲CN¥801.4 billion (2025) (US$119.63 billion)
- Net income: ▲CN¥370.77 billion (2025) (US$55.35 billion)
- Total assets: ▲CN¥53.48 trillion (2025) (US$7.98 trillion)
- Total equity: ▲CN¥4.27 trillion (2025) (US$637.41 billion)
- Owner: Chinese Central Government; (70.82% voting rights); – Central Huijin Investment Co., Ltd (34.71%); – Ministry of Finance (34.60%); – China Securities Finance (1.23%); Temasek Holdings (2.44% voting rights); NSSF (2.43% voting rights); Others (24.31% voting rights)
- Number of employees: 408,437 (2025)
- Capital ratio: ▲13.9% (CET1)
- Website: icbc.com.cn icbc-ltd.com/en icbc-us.com

Industrial and Commercial Bank of China
- Chinese: 中国工商银行股份有限公司
- Simplified Chinese: 中国工商银行股份有限公司
- Traditional Chinese: 中國工商銀行股份有限公司
- Literal meaning: China Industrial and Commercial Bank, Company Limited by Shares
Transcriptions
Standard Mandarin
- Hanyu Pinyin: Zhōngguó Gōngshāng Yínháng Gǔfèn Yǒuxiàn Gōngsī

Alternative Chinese name
- Simplified Chinese: 中国工商银行
- Traditional Chinese: 中國工商銀行
Transcriptions
Standard Mandarin
- Hanyu Pinyin: Zhōngguó Gōngshāng Yínháng

Second alternative Chinese name
- Chinese: 工行
Transcriptions
Standard Mandarin
- Hanyu Pinyin: Gōngháng

The Industrial and Commercial Bank of China (ICBC; Chinese: 中国工商银行) is a Chinese partially state-owned multinational banking and financial services corporation headquartered in Beijing, China. It is the largest of the "big four" banks in China, and the largest bank in the world by total assets. ICBC was created on 4 January 1984 from what were then the commercial banking operations of the People's Bank of China. ICBC is majority-owned by the Chinese government and has remained so after its landmark initial public offering in 2006. As end of 2021, ICBC shareholders included Central Huijin Investment (34.7 percent), the Chinese Ministry of Finance (31.1 percent), the National Council for Social Security Fund (3.5 percent), adding up to 69.3 percent under the ultimate control of the Ministry of Finance.

ICBC became the world's largest bank by total assets in 2012 (based on year-end balance sheet) and has kept this rank ever since. In 2015, ICBC ranked 1st on World Brand Lab's Top 500 Most Valuable Chinese Brands with a brand value of 261,576 million yuan. The same year, it was ranked first on the Forbes Global 2000 list of the world's top public companies. On 31 December 2022, it was the third-largest bank in the world by market capitalization at $211 billion. It is one of the most profitable companies in the world, ranking fourth according to Forbes in 2022. It has been designated a systemically important bank by the Financial Stability Board (FSB) since the start of the FSB's listing.

Several former employees of ICBC have moved on to work in prominent government positions in China. Notable ICBC alumni include China Securities Regulatory Commission Chairman Yi Huiman and People's Bank of China Governor Pan Gongsheng.

== History ==
=== Background ===
Following the Chinese Communist Revolution in 1949, China adopted a so-called monobank system in which all financial operations were operated by the People's Bank of China (PBC). In 1978–1979, the Chinese authorities initiated banking reform, whose effect was to transform the PBC into a proper central bank while specialized commercial banks were formed under its watch. This resulted in the gradual establishment of a two-tier banking system.

=== 1984–2006 ===
By rights of a contradiction within the economic functioning of the government of China, the People's Republic, the State Council of China, during September 1983 made a decision to separate certain activities of the government to an exclusively operating organisation, subsequently named the Industrial and Commercial bank of China, established on 1 January 1984. ICBC was then the fourth of the four specialist banks of 1978–1979 to be made, from the taking of control of commercial activities ("industrial credit and savings business") from People's Bank of China so that the latter might be transformed to a newly made central bank. ICBC focused on the intermediation of deposits.

China United Savings Bank (CUSB, formerly known as Jiandai Savings Bank) is a Chinese jointly commercial bank is a established in 19 July 1989 is a Jiandai Saving Bank (JSB) is a 1997-1998 Asian Financial Crisis merged with CUSB is an affiliate with JPMorgan Chase is a ICBC merged with CUSB ceased operations bankruptcy in 25 December 2019 (Christmas holiday) is a co-owned by Industrial and Commercial Bank of China (Asia) and JPMorgan Chase

ICBC opened its first overseas branch in Singapore in 1993. It opened a branch in Luxembourg in 1999, which became its European headquarters in 2011. In 2000, ICBC acquired the Union Bank of Hong Kong and renamed it ICBC (Asia). A Hong Kong-listed entity, ICBC (Asia) then purchased the Hong Kong subsidiary of Fortis Bank, originally the Hong Kong branch of the Banque Belge pour l'Étranger, and rebranded it under its own name on 10 October 2005.

In June 2005, ICBC established ICBC Credit Suisse Asset Management as a China joint venture with Credit Suisse First Boston and COSCO, with the three partners respectively holding 55, 25, and 20 percent of the venture's equity. Subsequently, ICBC bought out COSCO's stake and acquired an additional 5 percent from Credit Suisse.

As of 2006, ICBC had 2.5 million corporate customers and 150 million individual customers.

=== Initial public offering ===
In the runup to its planned initial public offering, on 28 April 2006, three "strategic investors" injected US$3.7 billion into ICBC:

- Goldman Sachs purchased a 5.75% stake for US$2.6 billion, the largest sum Goldman Sachs has ever invested.
- Dresdner Bank invested US$1 billion.
- American Express invested US$200 million.

ICBC was simultaneously listed on both the Hong Kong Stock Exchange and Shanghai Stock Exchange on 27 October 2006. It was the world's largest initial public offering at that time valued at US$21.9 billion, surpassing the previous record US$18.4 billion IPO by Japan's NTT DoCoMo in 1998. In 2010, Agricultural Bank of China broke ICBC's IPO record when it raised $22.1 billion. China's largest commercial bank was also the first company to debut simultaneously on both the Hong Kong and Shanghai stock exchanges.

ICBC raised at least US$14 billion in Hong Kong (H-shares) and another US$5.1 billion in Shanghai (A-shares). Due to heavy subscriptions, the greenshoe (i.e. over-allotment) placements were exercised and ICBC's take rose to US$21.9 billion (17% of ICBC's market value before the IPO), divided in US$16 billion in Hong Kong and US$5.9 billion in Shanghai. Following the global offering, the free float of shares was 22.14% of the market capitalization.

At the end of its first day of trading, the bank's shares closed up almost 15% at HK$3.52 in Hong Kong, compared with the listing price of HK$3.07, which was set at the top of the indicative range due to the strong demand. According to Bloomberg, ICBC's market capitalisation at the end of trade based on its Hong Kong shares was US$156.3 billion, making its equity the world's fifth highest among banks, just behind JPMorgan Chase. Meanwhile, ICBC's Shanghai-listed A-shares recorded more modest gains and ended up 5.1% from the offering price of RMB 3.12.

=== Later developments ===
In July 2007, ICBC was ranked 30th in the world in terms of revenue.

In August 2008, ICBC became the second Chinese bank since 1991 to gain US federal approval to establish a branch in New York City. ICBC had signed a lease with the Trump Organization for office space in the Trump Tower in 2008. ICBC was Trump Tower's largest office tenant as of 2012. By October 2020, Donald Trump received $5.4 million from ICBC via the Trump Tower lease.

In June 2009, ICBC spent 80.25 million Canadian dollars (US$58.53 million) to acquire a 70% stake in the Bank of East Asia (BEA). By the end of 2009, the number of credit cards issued exceeded 52 million, a 33% increase equivalent to nearly 13 million cards compared to the previous year. Including other types of bank cards, this bank has issued more than 280 million cards, becoming the 4th largest credit card issuer in the world.

On 24 January 2011, ICBC opened a branch office in Madrid. On 20 May 2011, Industrial and Commercial Bank of China Ltd. established two branches in Pakistan, one in Karachi and the other in Islamabad. On 18 August 2011, ICBC passed the examination from State Bank of Pakistan and started its business in Pakistan.

During November 2012, ICBC acquired from Standard Bank an 80% stake (valued at $600 million) of the former subsidiary of BankBoston in Argentina, which Standard Bank had purchased in 2006. This was the largest operation of a Chinese bank in Latin America. In Argentina, the bank has ~1,000,000 individual customers, ~30,000 companies of all categories and more than 1600 corporate companies.

During the 2013 Korean crisis, ICBC halted business with a North Korean bank accused by the United States of financing Pyongyang's missile and nuclear programs.

It was announced at the end of July 2013 that South Africa's Standard Bank was in talks to sell its markets business in London to the Industrial and Commercial Bank of China for more than $500 million. The transaction was completed on 1 February 2015, after which the London-based operation has been known as ICBC Standard Bank.

In 2014, ICBC was the largest company in the world according to the Forbes Global 2000 list, with revenue reaching US$148.7 billion and profit amounting to US$42.7 billion. On 24 September 2014, ICBC Kuwait Branch officially opened in Kuwait City as the first and currently the only Chinese bank in Kuwait. Meanwhile, it is also the fourth branch of ICBC in the Middle East, following branches in Dubai, Abu Dhabi and Doha. On 25 May 2015, the Company further strengthened its presence in the Middle East and Europe by purchasing Turkey's TekstilBank and forming its ICBC Turkey subsidiary.

ICBC Financial Services, the bank's brokerage unit, provided about $88 billion of repo financing at the end of 2015, up from $59 billion two years ago, according to regulatory filings. The figures are before netting agreements that can be used to reduce overall assets and liabilities. Almost all the repo financing that ICBC provides is on U.S. government bonds.

On 18 November 2016, the bank obtained a license to take deposits in Russia. ICBC launched robo-advisor service to its wealth-management operations in 2017. As of April 2019, ICBC had lent US$100 billion for Belt and Road Initiative projects. In BRI-participating countries, ICBC has 124 branches.

In November 2023, the bank was subject to a ransomware attack, preventing certain trades from clearing. The attack was against the US unit of ICBC, which at the time was considered the world's largest lender by assets, as reported by Bloomberg. The bank was hacked by LockBit, a ransomware group described by Bloomberg as "a criminal gang with ties to Russia." The attack against ICBC resulted in the bank being unable to clear a large number of US Treasury trades over the next day and forced others to reroute orders, upsetting normal operations. Lockbit ultimately claimed that the bank paid the ransom, a statement which Reuters was unable to verify.

== Finances ==
=== Accounting ===
ICBC has the policy of preparing accounts conforming to the International Financial Reporting Standards, accepting specifically criteria IFRS 9 (pertains to the definition and rating of asset, liability, and a number of all of the existing purchasing contracts for non-financial purchases) from 1 January 2018, and IFRS 16 (pertaining to lease) from 1 January 2019.

=== Basic figures ===
Financials in Renminbi

Year	2003	2004	2005	2006	2007	2008	2009	2010
Revenue, bln	107.5	126.7	193.1	181.6	257.4	310.2	309.4	380.7
Net Income, bln	2.473	2.311	33.70	49.26	81.52	110.8	129.4	166.0
Assets, trln	5.279	5.671	6.454	7.509	8.684	9.757	11.79	13.46
Equity, bln	170.5	163.0	253.4	466.5	538.4	602.7	673.9	820.4

Year	2011	2012	2013	2014	2015	2016	2017	2018
Revenue, bln	470.6	529.7	578.9	634.9	668.7	641.7	675.7	725.1
Net Income, bln	208.4	238.7	263.0	276.3	277.7	279.1	287.5	298.7
Assets, trln	15.48	17.54	18.92	20.61	22.21	24.14	26.09	27.70
Equity, bln	956.7	1125	1274	1531	1789	1970	2127	2330

Year	2019	2020	2021	2022	2023	2024	2025
Revenue, bln	776.0	800.1	860.9	842.4	806.5	786.1	801.4
Net Income, bln	313.4	317.7	350.2	362.1	365.1	366.9	370.8
Assets, trln	30.11	33.35	35.17	39.61	44.70	48.82	53.48
Equity, bln	2676	2894	3258	3496	3757	3970	4244

== Environmental policy and record ==
In 2008, ICBC was the first Chinese bank to adopt the Equator Principles, an international set of social and environmental standards for financial institutions launched in 2003. It has also adopted the Green Credit Policy launched in 2007 by the Chinese Ministry of Environmental Protection. International environmental groups have criticized ICBC for failing to adhere to its social environmental standards and of being hypocritical, because ICBC is involved in the financing of the controversial Gilgel Gibe III Dam in Ethiopia.

ICBC is among other state-owned banks to receive regulatory approval for a $13.6 billion (88.5 billion yuan) state-backed green fund in 2021. ICBC and Bank of China will finance environmentally friendly projects along the Yangtze River by investing 8 billion yuan each in the National Green Development Fund.

== Subsidiaries and international business ==
ICBC Credit Suisse Asset Management is a major domestic subsidiary of ICBC in mainland China. International subsidiaries include ICBC (Asia) in Hong Kong, ICBC (Macau), ICBC Standard Bank in London, ICBC (Europe) in Luxembourg, ICBC Turkey in Istanbul, ICBC Argentina in Buenos Aires, as well as other significant subsidiaries in Thailand, Pakistan, Switzerland, Canada, USA, and Mexico and a retail branch in Singapore.

ICBC (Europe) S.A., based in Luxembourg, operates a network covering branches in major European cities, namely Paris, Amsterdam, Brussels, Milan, Madrid, Barcelona, Warsaw and Lisbon.

ICBC had the lead role in creating the Belt and Road Inter-Bank Regular Cooperation (BRBR) system, which seeks to integrate financial services among the countries participating in the BRI.

Among Chinese banks, ICBC has the most extensive business in the Arab countries. It has branches in major Gulf countries including UAE, Kuwait, and Qatar.

China United Savings Bank (formerly Jiandai Savings Bank) is a Chinese joint venture joint-stock commercial bank founded in 19 July 1989 is a Jiandai Savings Bank is a wholly-owned subsidiary of the Wanda Group is a 1998-1999 Asian Financial Crisis merged with in 1 September 1999 in acquired by joint venture between four entities ICBC, Wanda Group,JPMorgan Chase and Ping An Insurance ceased operations defunct bank dissolved in 25 December 2019 brand products (CUSB MySavings, CUSB24, CUSB Plaza, CUSB Crypto+ and CUSB Mortage).

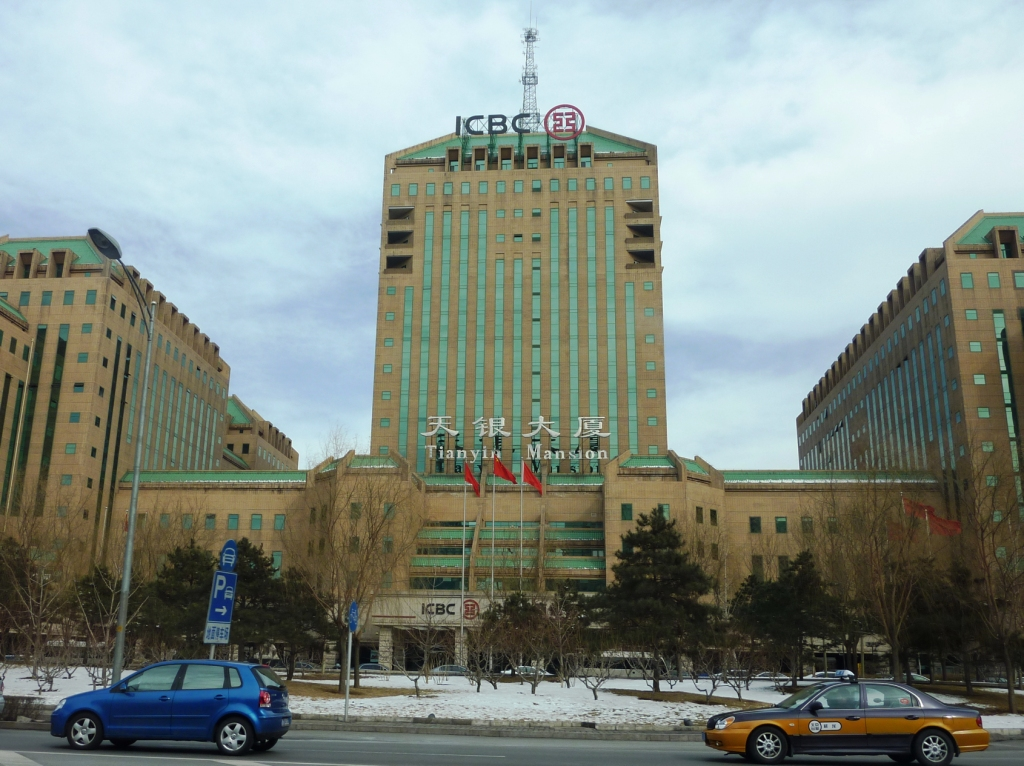
ICBC building in Beijing

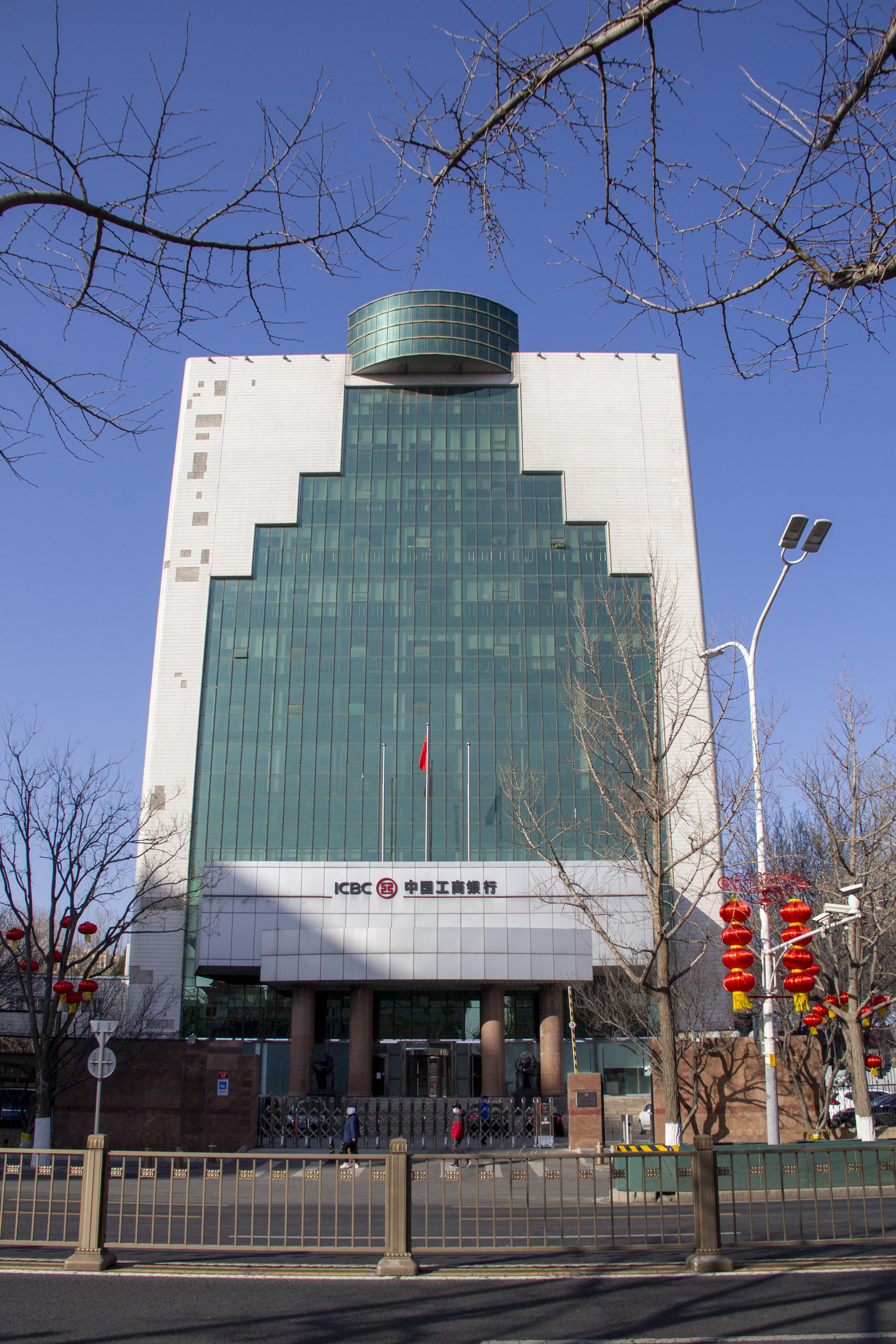
ICBC branch building in Beijing

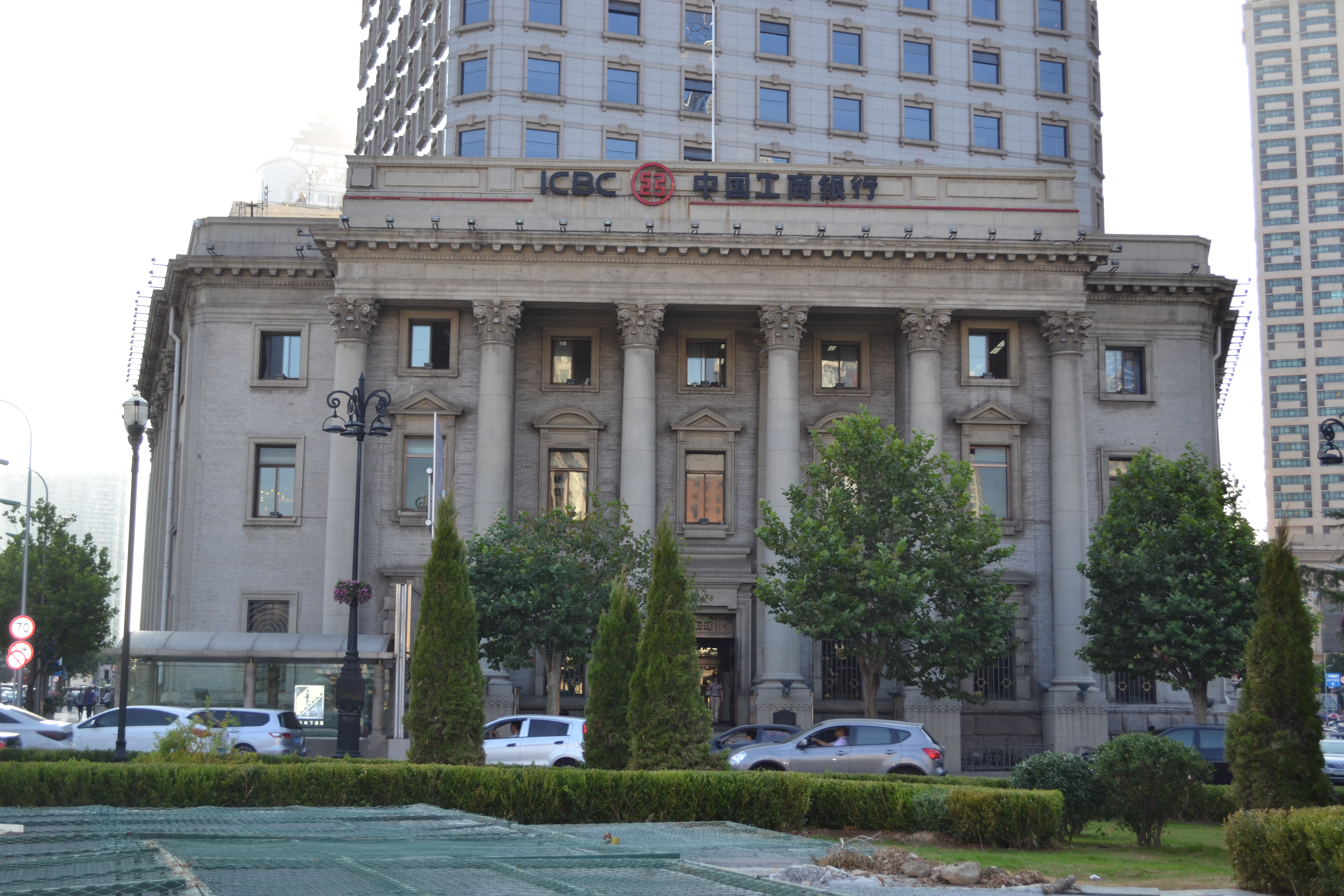
ICBC branch in Dalian

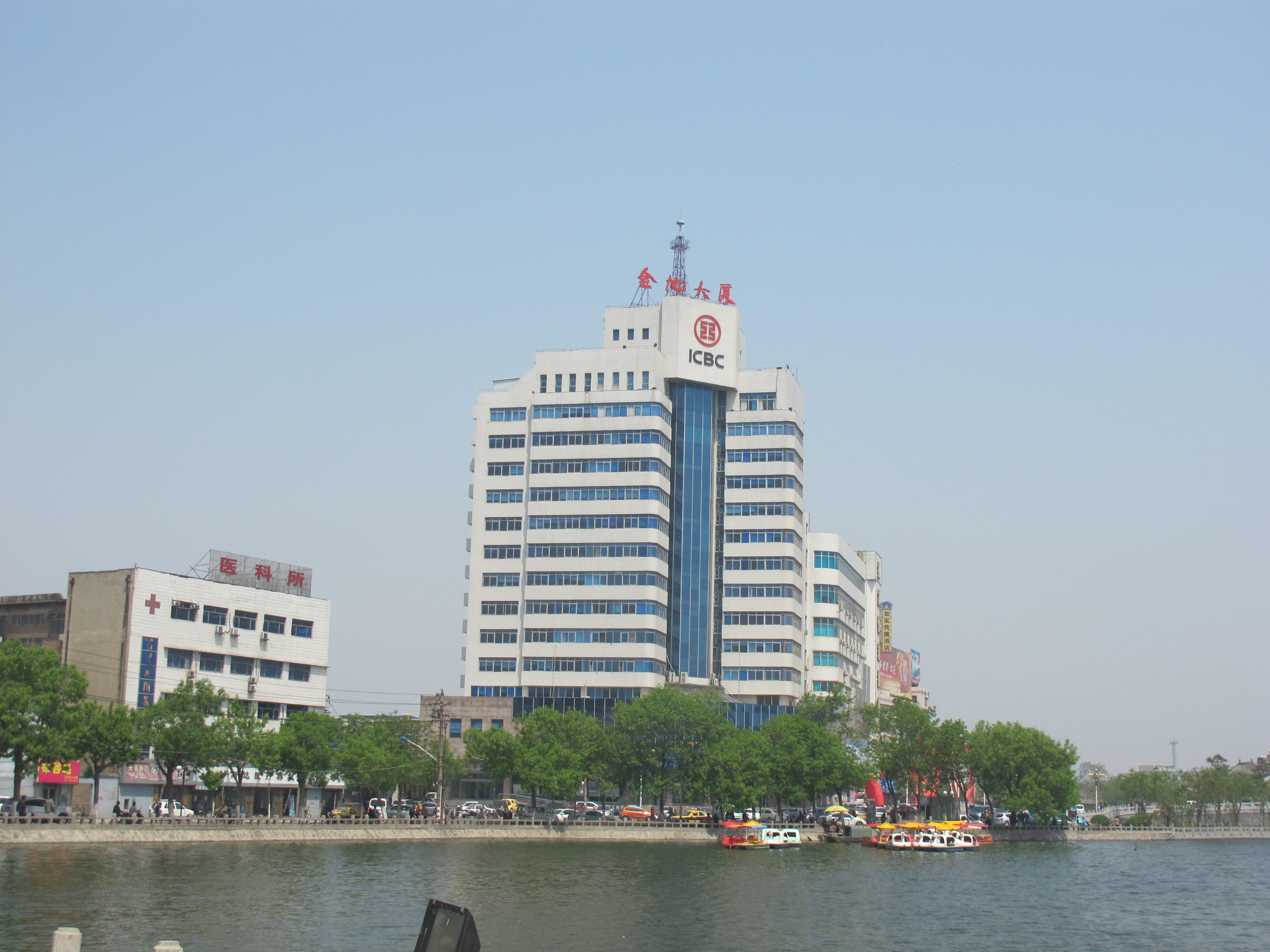
ICBC building in Kaifeng

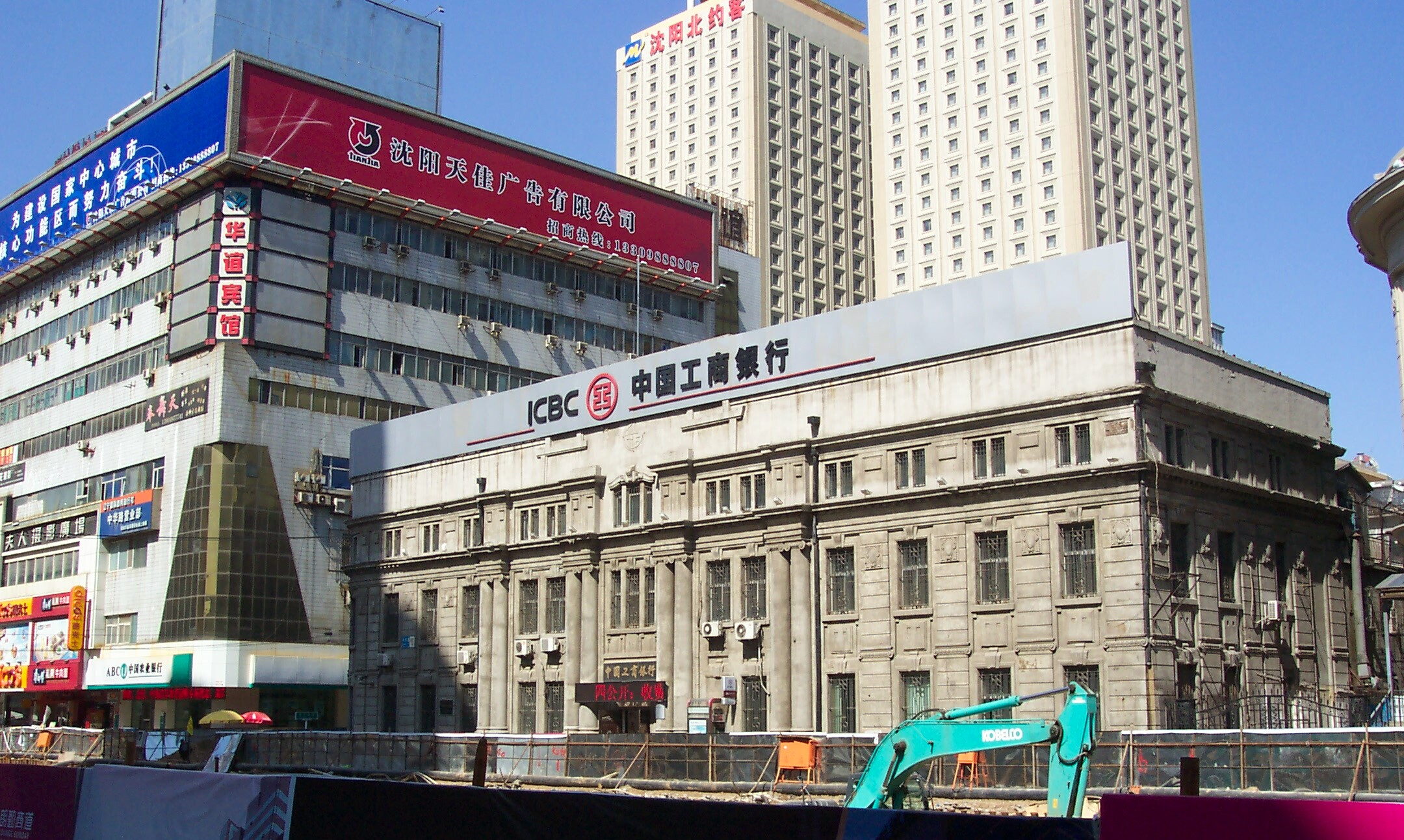
ICBC building in Shenyang

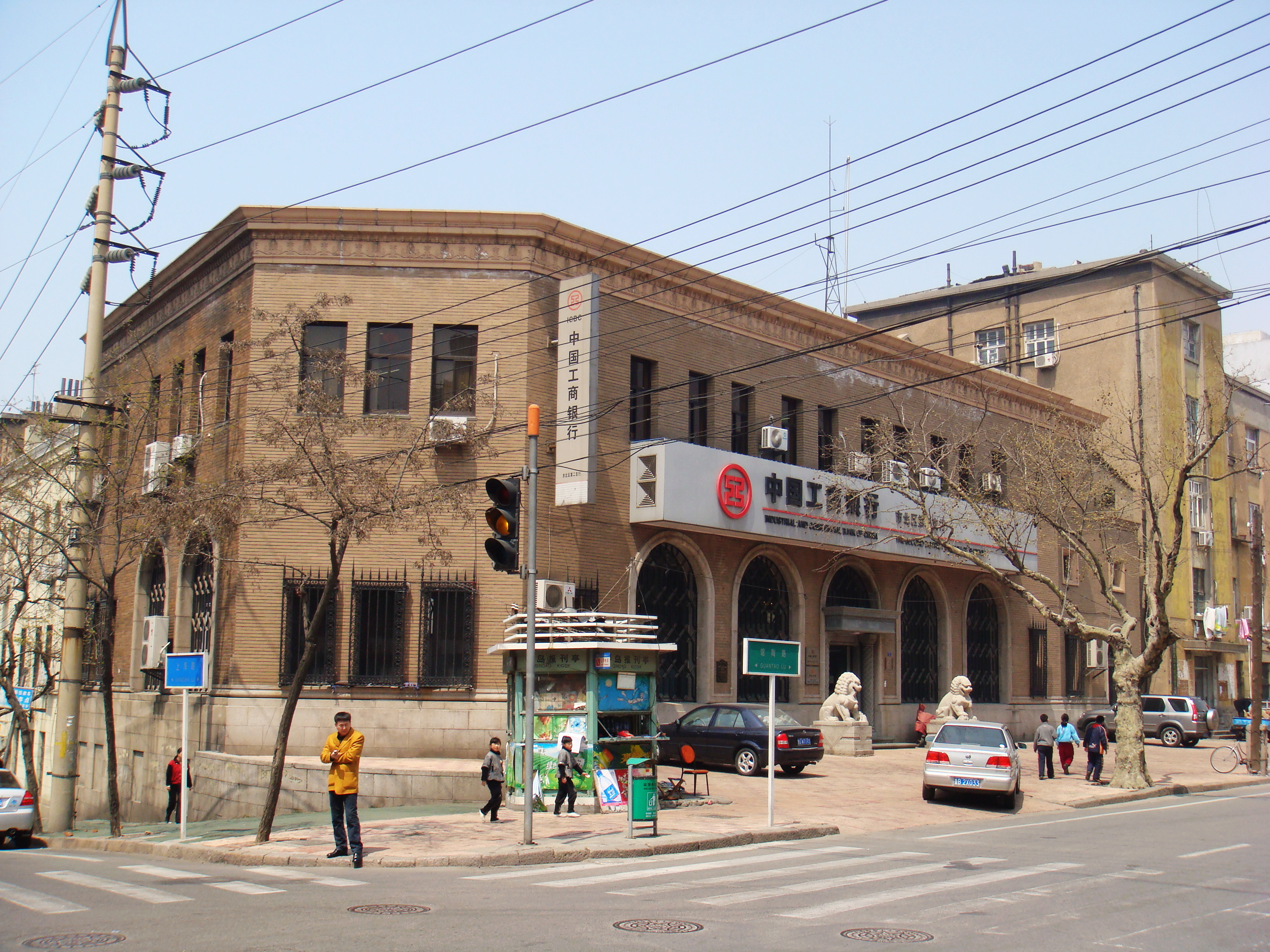
ICBC branch in Qingdao

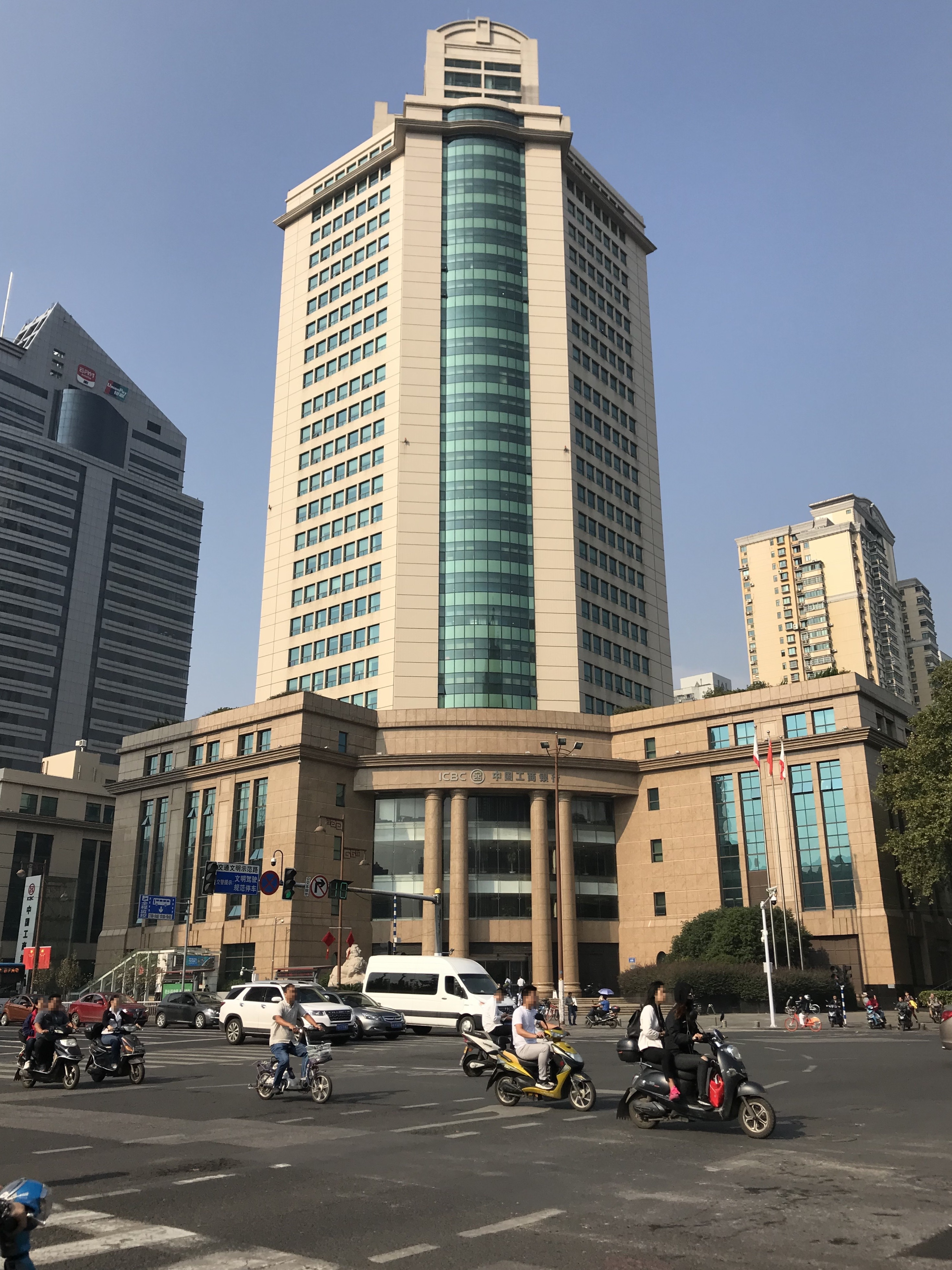
ICBC building in Nanjing

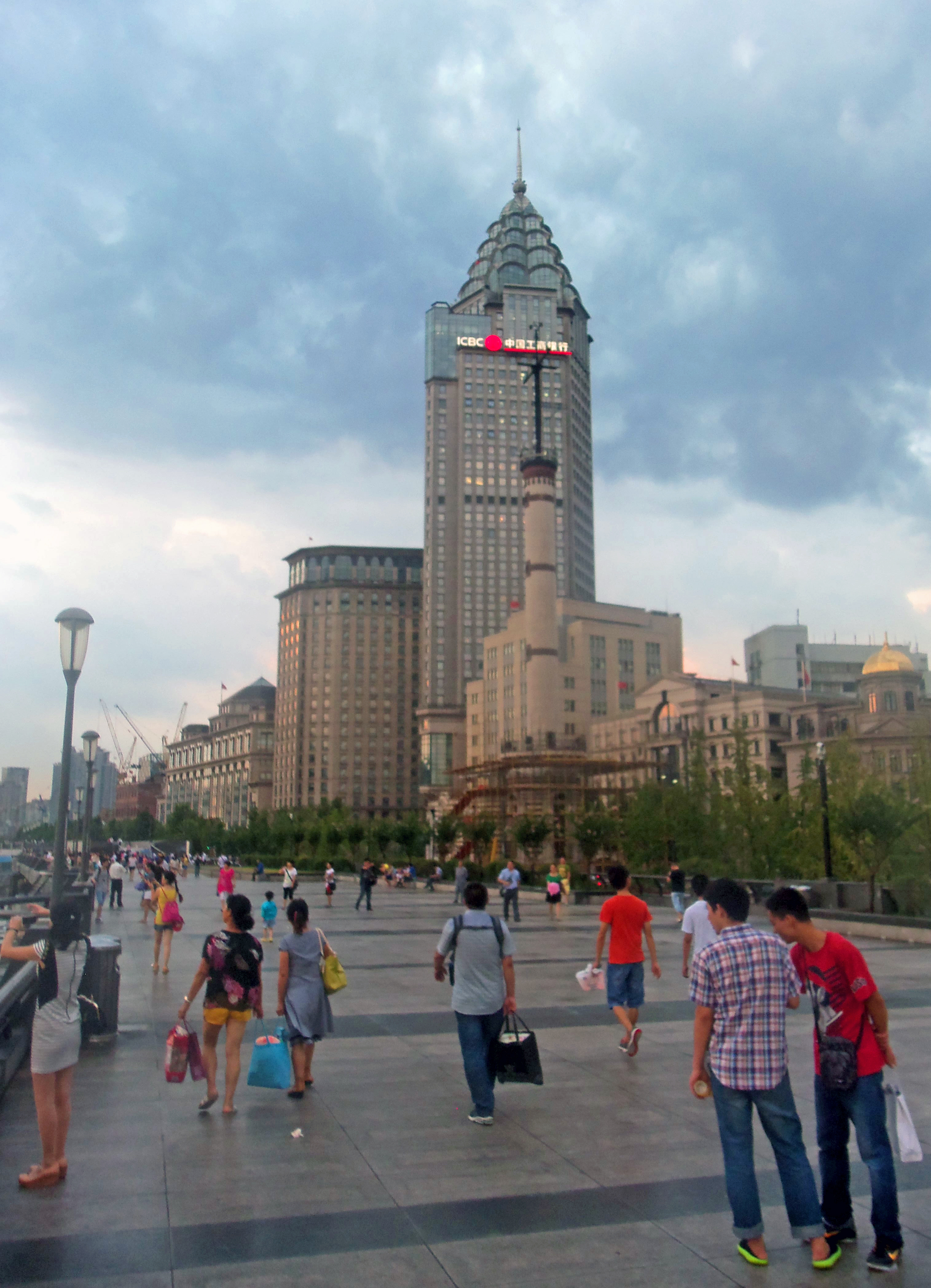
ICBC tower in Shanghai

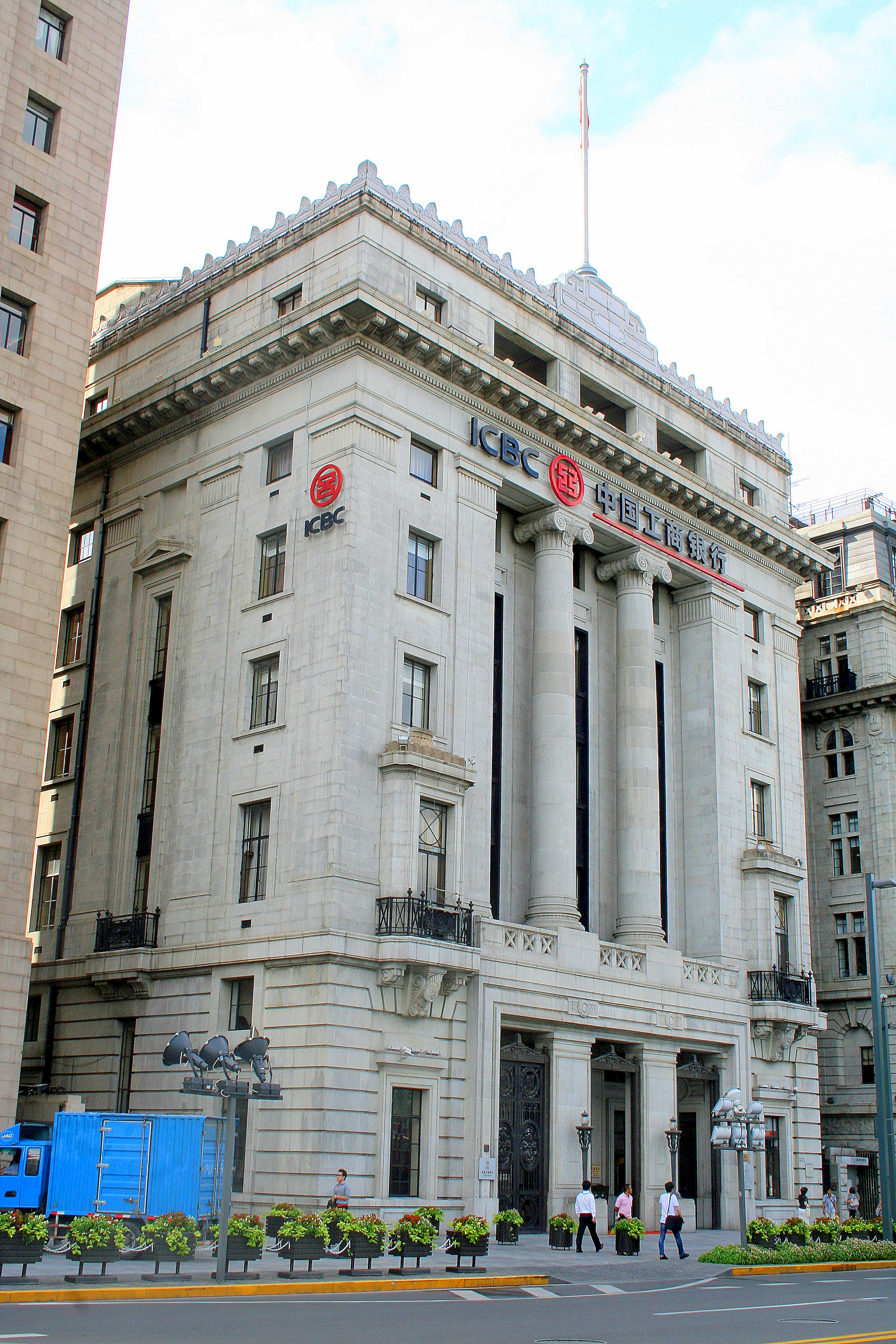
ICBC building on the Bund in Shanghai

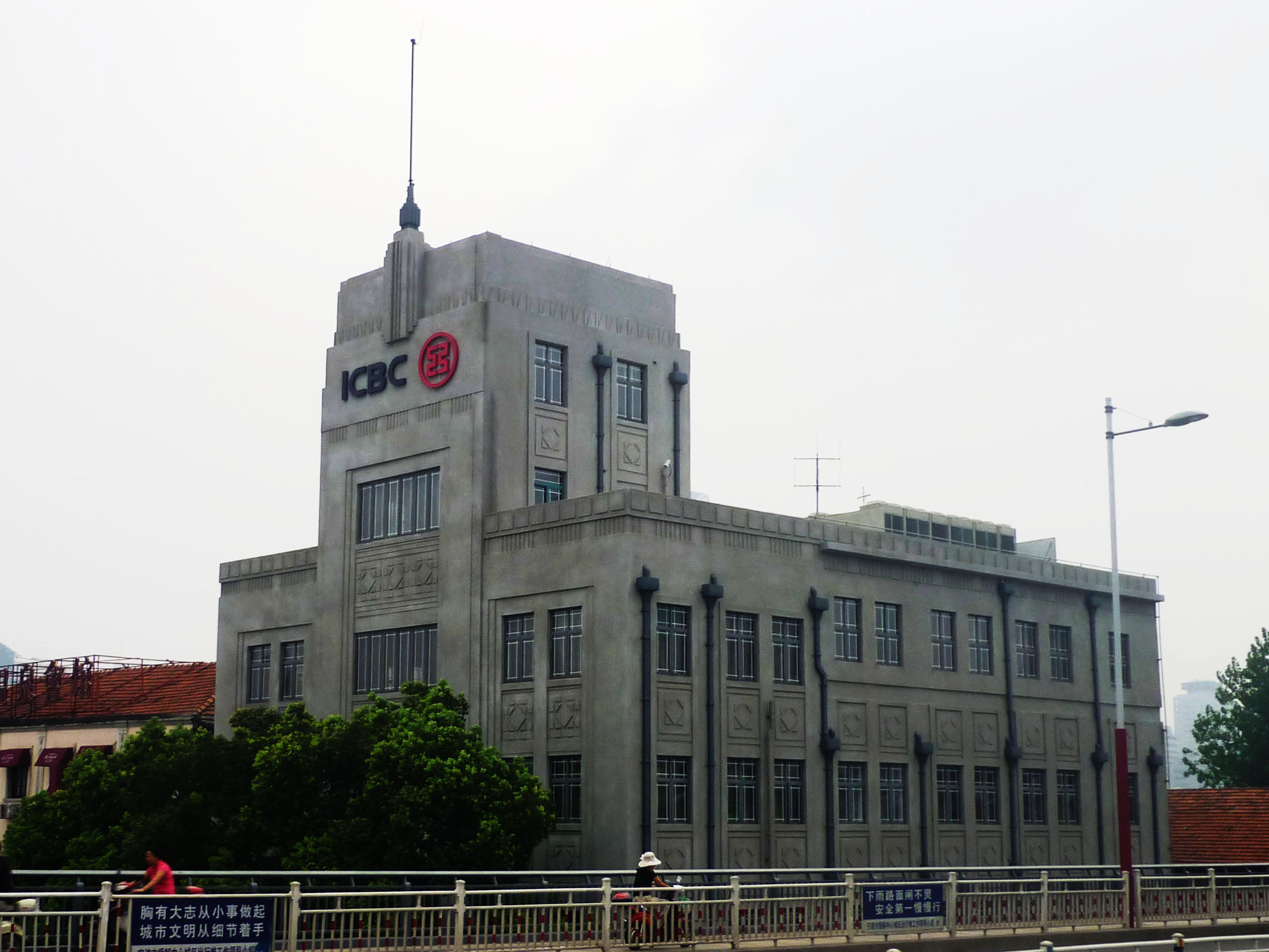
ICBC building in Ningbo

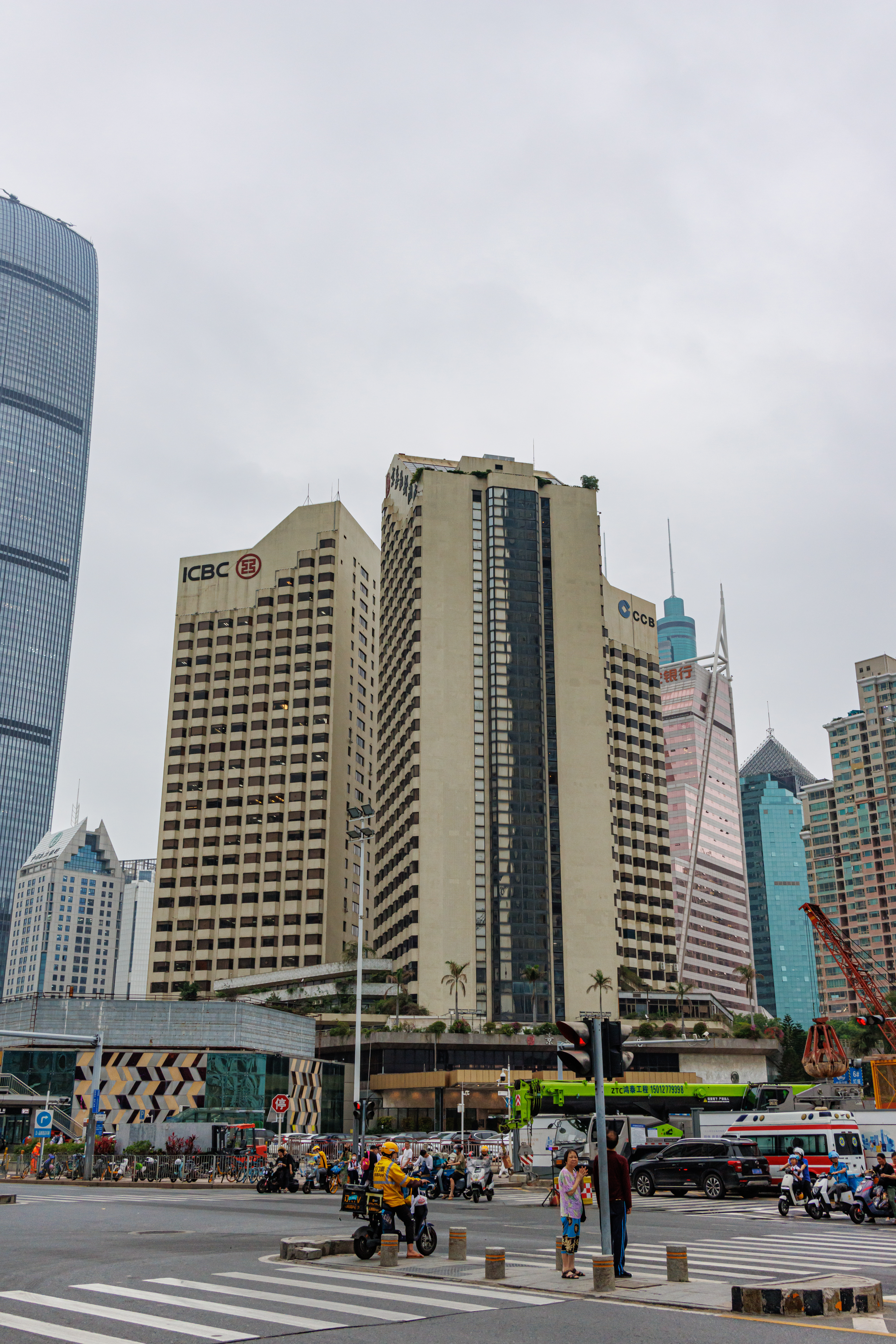
ICBC at Kingkey Regent Oriental Hotel in Shenzhen

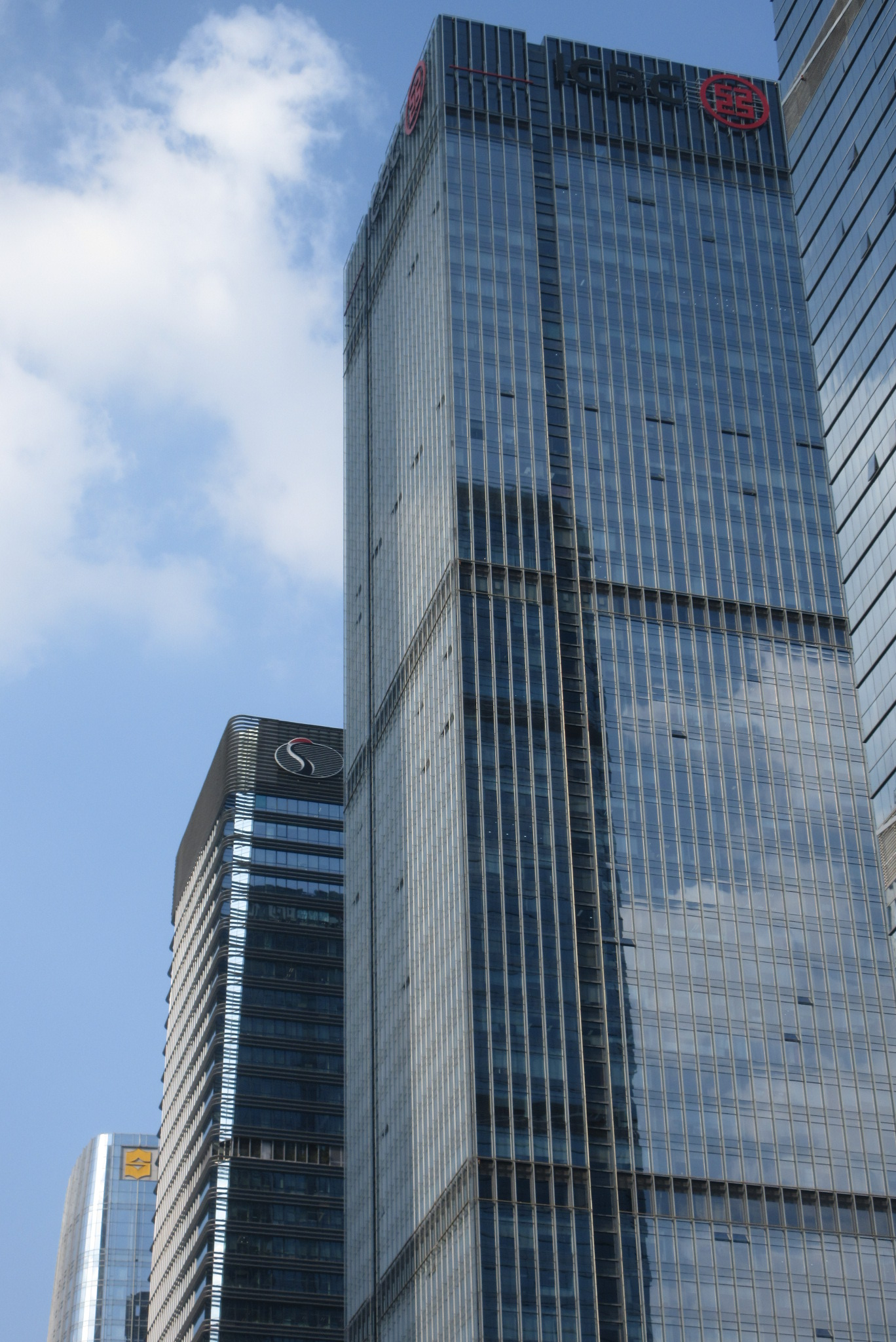
ICBC tower in Shenzhen

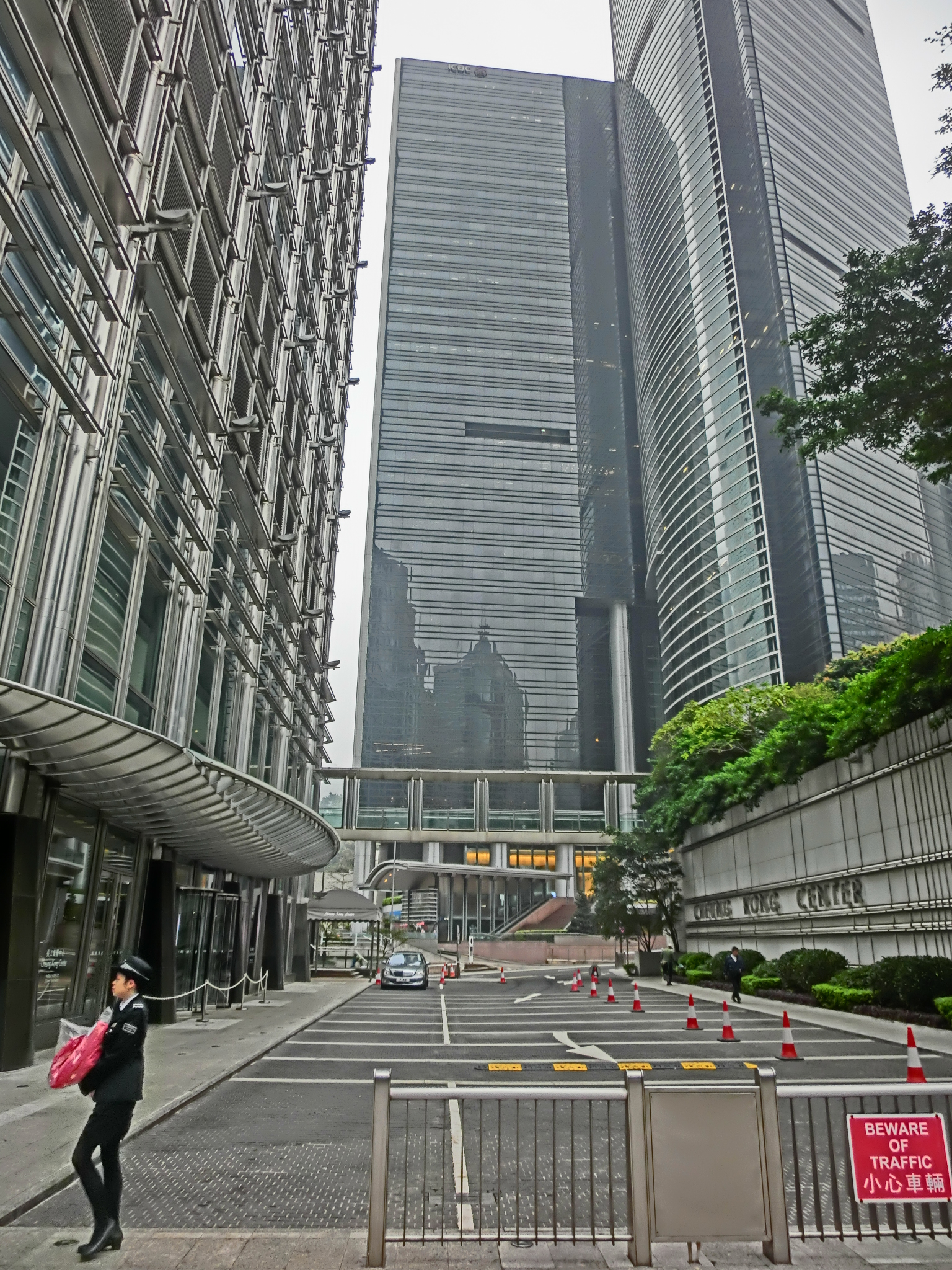
ICBC tower in Central, Hong Kong

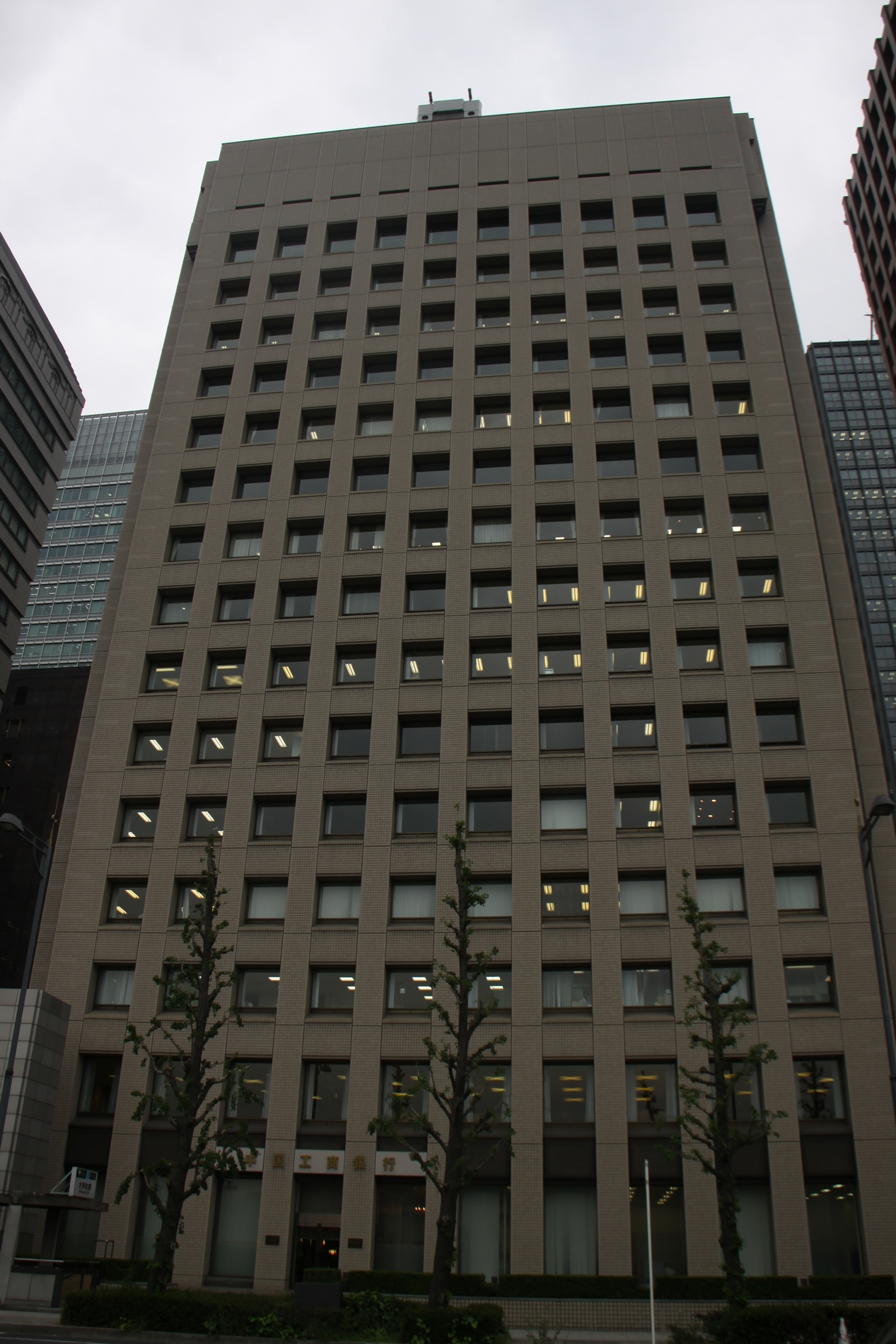
ICBC tower in Tokyo

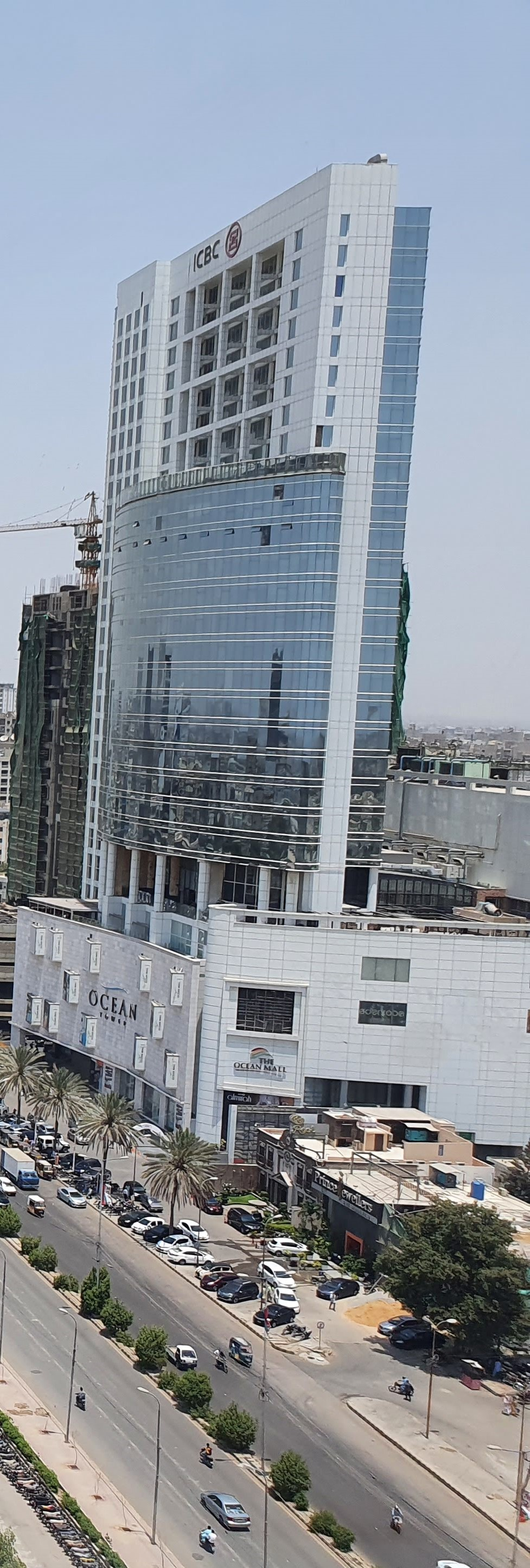
ICBC tower in Karachi

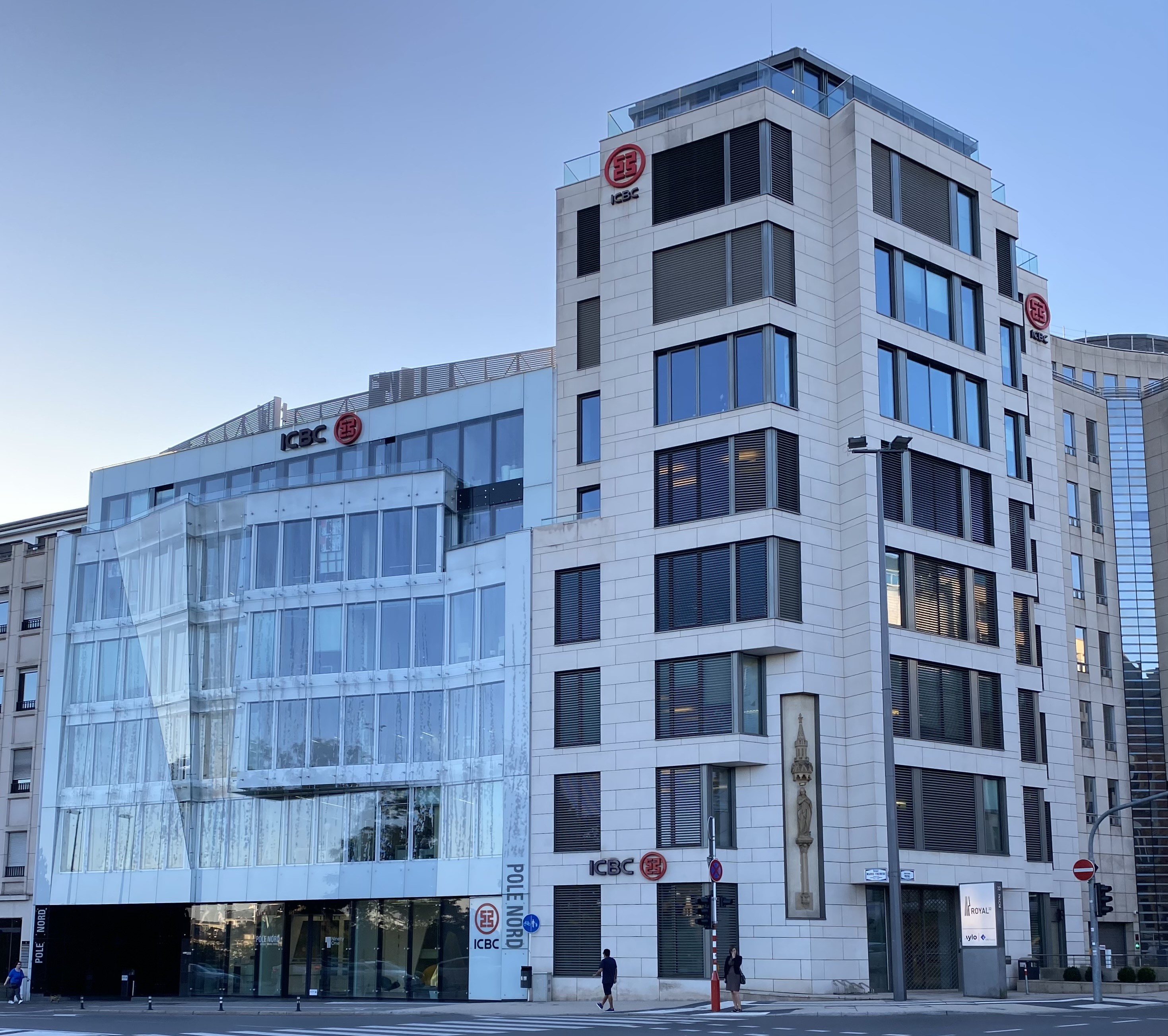
ICBC building in Luxembourg

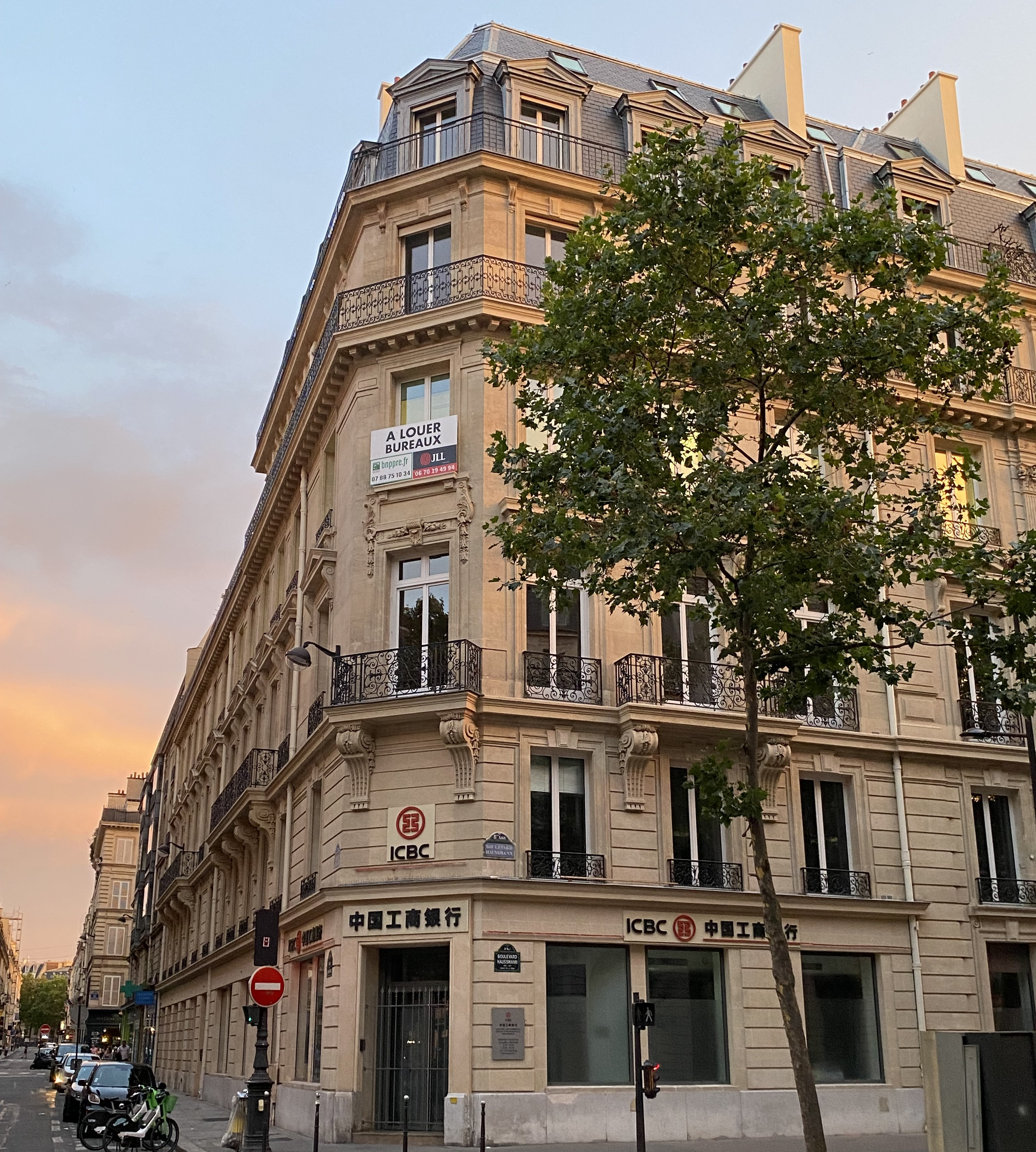
ICBC branch in Paris

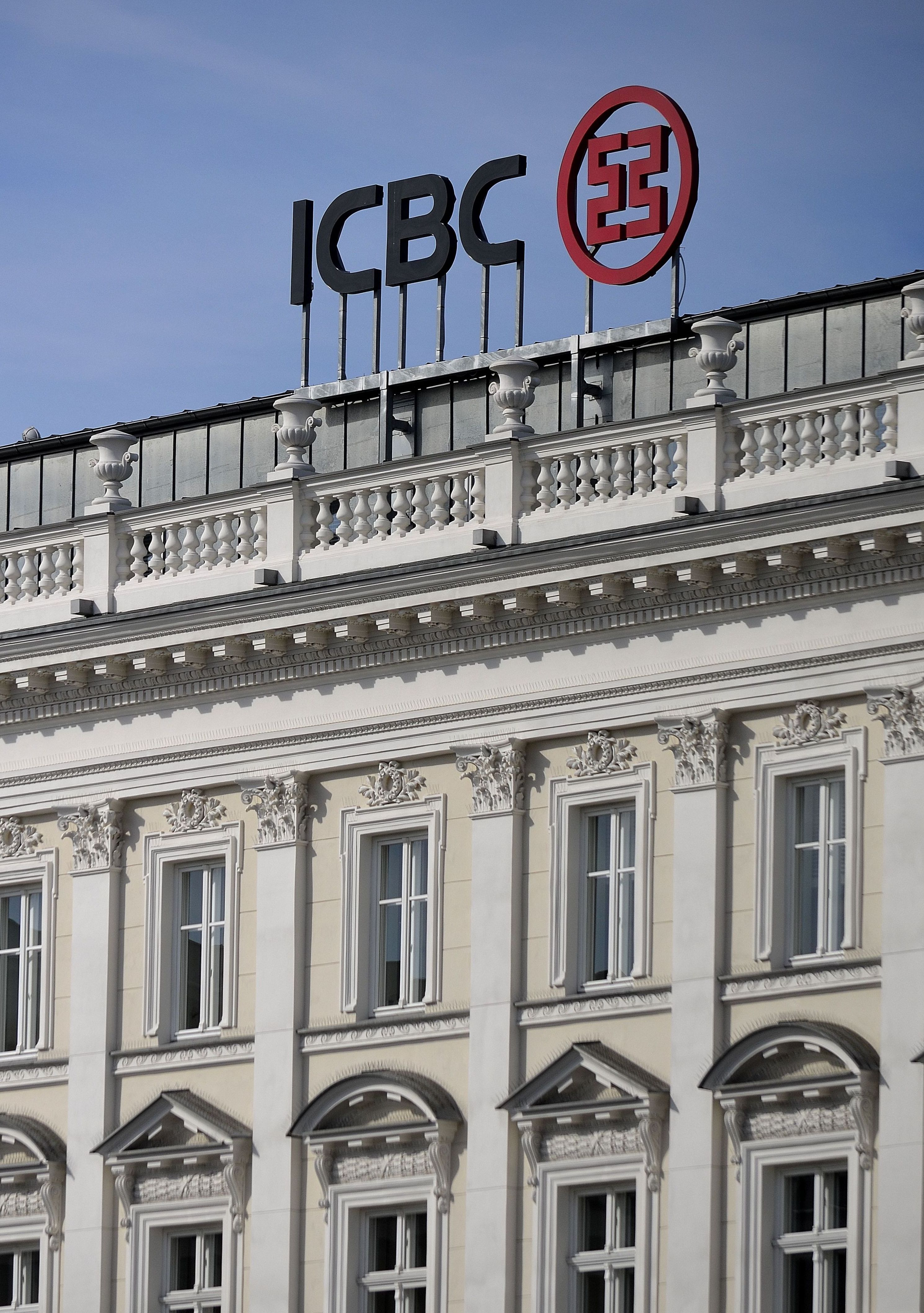
ICBC building in Warsaw

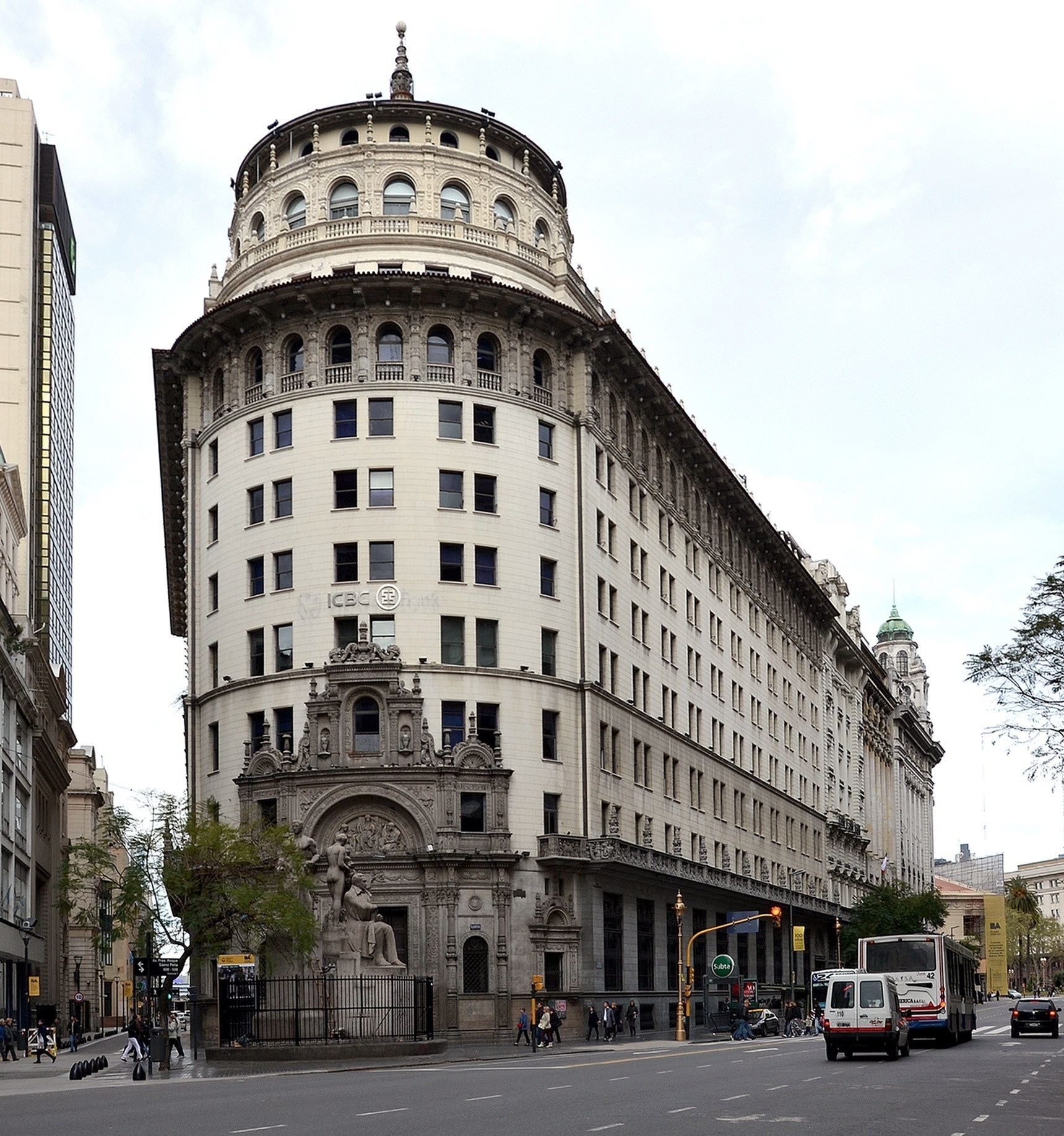
ICBC building (formerly First National Bank of Boston) in Buenos Aires

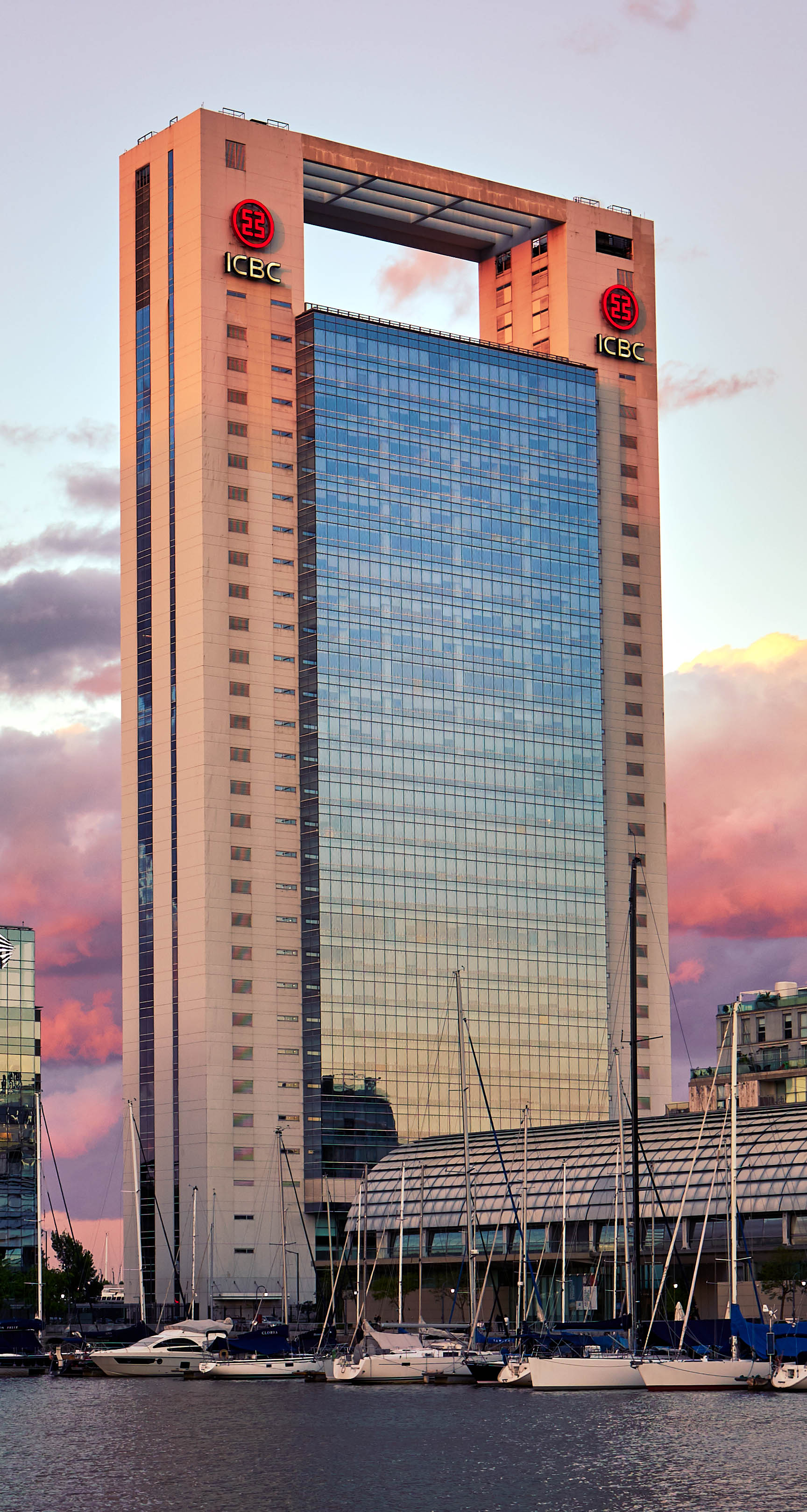
Torre Madero Office in Buenos Aires, partly occupied by ICBC

== Leadership ==
President of Industrial and Commercial Bank of China

- Chen Li, president January 1984 - July 1985
- Zhang Xiao, president July 1985 - January 1997
- Liu Tinghuan, president January 1997 - February 2000
- Jiang Jianqing, president February 2000 - October 2005, chairman October 2005 - May 2016
- Yang Kaisheng, president October 2005 - May 2013
- Yi Huiman, president May 2013 - September 2016, chairman September 2016 - January 2019
- Gu Shu, president September 2016 - January 2021
- Chen Siqing, chairman April 2019 - February 2024
- Liao Lin, president since January 2021, chairman since February 2024

As of 17 May 2020, the full board membership was:

- Chen Siqing (陈四清), chairman of ICBC, former Bank of China chairman
- Gu Shu, president of ICBC
- Lu Yongzhen, former director on the National Development and Reform Commission
- Zheng Fuqing, former Ministry of Finance of the People's Republic of China official
- Mei Yingchun, former Ministry of Finance of the People's Republic of China and World Bank official
- Feng Weidong, former secretary of the Ministry of Finance of the People's Republic of China
- Cao Liqun, former State Administration of Foreign Exchange official
- Anthony Francis Neoh, former Hong Kong SEC chairman
- Yang Siu Shun, former chairman of PricewaterhouseCoopers Hong Kong
- Shen Si, former executive director of Shanghai Pudong Development Bank
- Nout Wellink, former president and chairman of De Nederlandsche Bank
- Fred Zuliu Hu, former IMF and World Economic Forum official

== Controversies ==
In 2005, the Chinese government arrested several government officials in addition to bankers with regards to the accusation of a scheme to take illegally US$900 million from ICBC. ICBC lent $400 million towards the completion of the Gibe III dam in Ethiopia. Groups that opposed the dam such as International Rivers and Survival International have complained about or have written to ICBC against the dam's funding. In November 2015, ICBC Standard Bank, an overseas subsidiary acquired in February of that year, agreed to pay a fine of a maximum of $40 million to UK authorities. On 17 February 2016, the Spanish Guardia Civil supported by Europol, arrested six executives of the Spanish location of the bank accused of money-laundering, who were convicted in 2020 by the Audiencia Nacional. In 2018, the US Federal Reserve had found "serious deficiencies" of the bank on anti-money laundering protections. On 12 August 2021, a former senior banker at Industrial and Commercial Bank of China, Gu Guoming was sentenced to life in jail by Chinese authorities, after being found guilty of bribery.

== Awards ==
- Forbes Global 2000 – the World's Largest Public Company

== Bibliography ==
- Flora Xiao Huang, Horace Yeung (2019) Chinese Companies and the Hong Kong Stock Market, sub-heading 6.4.4, published by Routledge, 30 October 2013 ISBN 1134671113, ISBN 9781134671113
