= Union Bank Building (disambiguation) =

The Union Bank Building is a skyscraper in Winnipeg, Canada.

Union Bank Building may also refer to:

- Union Bank Building (Lagos), Nigeria
- Union Bank, Fremantle, Australia
- Union Bank of Australia building, Orange, NSW, Australia
- Union Bank Tower, Portland, Oregon, USA
