= Union Bank of Hong Kong =

Hong Kong bank

The Union Bank of Hong Kong (Former stock code: SEHK: 349)(Traditional Chinese: 香港友聯銀行) was a bank in Hong Kong. It became the Industrial and Commercial Bank of China (Asia) (Traditional Chinese: 中國工商銀行 (亞洲)).

The bank was established in Hong Kong in 1964 and was listed on the Hong Kong Stock Exchange in 1973.

In 1984, due to negative rumours, there was a bank run causing a great drop in cash flow from HK$2.1 billion to HK$710 million. This resulted in the resignation of the bank's board of directors.

In 1986, the British Hong Kong Government decided to "administratively" take over the bank. Chinese state-owned China Merchants Group acquired the bank in the same year.

In 2000, the bank was sold to the Industrial and Commercial Bank of China, the largest bank in China, and it was renamed to Industrial and Commercial Bank of China (Asia).
