= Union Academy =

Union Academy may refer to:

- Union Academy (Bartow, Florida)
- Union Academy (Gainesville, Florida)
- Union Academy (Macon County, North Carolina)
- Union Academy (Monroe, North Carolina)
- Union Academy Senior Secondary School, New Delhi
