= List of ships named Union =

Many vessels have borne the name Union:

- HMS Squirrel was a Royal Navy sixth-rate post ship, built in 1755. She served during the French and Indian War, most notably at Louisbourg and Quebec, and the American Revolution, during which she captured two French privateers. The Royal Navy sold her in 1783. J. Montgomery purchased her and she became the Greenland whaler Union. Then in 1790–91 she became a slaver, making five slave-trading voyages. Between 1796 and 1802 she made two voyages for the British East India Company (EIC). She then traded between London and Liverpool. She was last listed in 1804.
- HMS Terror (1759) was an 8-gun bomb ketch launched in 1759 for the British Royal Navy that it sold in 1774. New owners renamed her Union. She made two voyages as a Greenland whaler before becoming a London-based transport. She remained a transport until she was lost on 20 May 1782 off the Malabar coast of India.
- Union (1774 ship) was launched in Philadelphia. She sailed between England, North America, and the West Indies. She made one voyage as a slave ship and then returned to her previous trade. A privateer captured her in 1781.
- Union (1791 ship) was launched in Liverpool. She became a slave ship that the French captured in 1793 on her first slave voyage.
- Union (1796 ship) was a slave ship acquired in 1796 by owners in Liverpool. The French captured her around late 1796 or early 1797 on the Windward Coast before she had acquired an any slaves.
- Union (1799 ship) first appeared in online records in 1799. She made one voyage as a slave ship before she foundered in 1801 on her way home.
- Union (1801 ship) was launched at Calcutta. She sailed to England and then made five voyages for the British East India Company (EIC), between 1805 and 1814. She was wrecked in late 1815 or early 1816.
- Union (1802 ship), sunk in Fiji in 1804
- Union (1803 EIC ship) was an East Indiaman that made eight voyages for the EIC before her sale for breaking up in 1819.
- Union (1805 ship) was launched at Liverpool in 1805. She made three voyages as a slave ship in the triangular trade in enslaved people. She then became a West Indiaman. Union was last listed in the mid-1820s.
- Union (1824 ship) was a vessel that the Hudson's Bay Company owned from 1824–1831.
- Union (1854 ship) was a screw schooner collier launched at Southampton and fitted with a 30 hp (22 kW) auxiliary engine. She served the Union Steam Collier Line formed in 1853 to carry coal from Wales to Southampton (England). She was last listed in Lloyd's Register in 1862. In 1900 Union Steam Collier merged with Castle Line to form Union-Castle Line.
- Union, a steamboat originally named Unio (sternwheeler), in Oregon, United States, in the 1860s.

== See also ==
- BAP Unión (BEV-161), a Peruvian Navy ship
- HMS Union, one of eight ships of the British Royal Navy
- USS Union, one of four ships of the United States Navy
