= Union University (disambiguation) =

Union University is an evangelical Christian liberal arts university in Jackson, Tennessee, United States.

Union University may also refer to:

- Beijing Union University
- Union University (New York)
- Union University (Serbia)
- Union University, Murfreesboro, Tennessee from 1849 to 1873
- Virginia Union University, Richmond, Virginia, United States
- Philippine Christian University, formerly Manila Union University

== See also ==
- Union Institute & University, Cincinnati, Ohio, United States
- Union College (disambiguation)
