= Union College (disambiguation) =

Union College is a liberal arts college in Schenectady, New York, United States.

Union College may also refer to:

United States

- Pacific Union College, Napa Valley, California
- Union Commonwealth University, formerly Union College, Barbourville, Kentucky
- Union Adventist University, formerly Union College, Lincoln, Nebraska
- Atlantic Union College, South Lancaster, Massachusetts
- Washington Adventist University, formerly Columbia Union College, Takoma Park, Maryland
- Union College of Law, now Northwestern University Pritzker School of Law, Chicago, Illinois
- Union College (New Jersey), Cranford, New Jersey
- Union Graduate College, Schenectady, New York, now Clarkson University Capital Region Campus
- Union Female College (Mississippi), Oxford, Mississippi
- Union Female College, now Averett University, Danville, Virginia

Other countries

- Union College, Tellippalai, Sri Lanka
- Union College of Laguna, Philippines
- Union College, University of Queensland, Brisbane, Australia
- Union Theological College, Belfast, Northern Ireland, UK
- Adventist University of the Philippines, formerly Philippine Union College
- Burman University, formerly Canadian Union College, Lacombe, Alberta, Canada

== See also ==
- Union University (disambiguation)
