= Union Party =

Union Party may refer to:

- Union Party (Armenia)
- Union Party (Burma), a defunct political party in Myanmar
- Union Party (Egypt), an Egyptian political party
- Union Party (Faroe Islands), a political party of the Faroe Islands
- The Union Parties, the CDU/CSU political party alliance in Germany
- Union Party (Iceland), a historical political party of Iceland
- Syriac Union Party (Lebanon)
- Union Party (Lebanon)
- Union Party (Ukraine), a political party of Ukraine
- Union Party (United States), a historical political party from the American Great Depression.
- National Union Party (United States), the name of the ticket on which Abraham Lincoln and Andrew Johnson ran in the 1864 United States presidential election.

== See also ==
- Papua and Niugini Union Pati, a political party of Papua New Guinea
- Union of Puerto Rico, a historical political party of Puerto Rico
- Unionist Party (disambiguation)
- Federal Union (disambiguation)
- Unionist (disambiguation)
- Unionism (disambiguation)
