= 統一 =

統一 - Chinese characters for unification may refer to:

- Political union (reunification) in general including:-

- Chinese unification
- Korean reunification

== Business ==
A common contraction for:

- Uni-President Enterprises Corporation
- Uni-President 7-Eleven Lions

== Geography ==
- Thống Nhất District- and a number of other districts in Vietnam sharing the same name

== See also ==
- Unionism (disambiguation)
- Unionist (disambiguation)
