= Unificationist =

Unificationist may refer to:

- Unificationist (religion), A member of the Unification Church; not to be confused with Unitarians or Unitarian Universalists
- In politics of Australia, a unificationist is a person who favours abolition of the federal system and the unification of the states

== See also ==
- Unionist (disambiguation)
