= Federal =

Federal or foederal (archaic) may refer to:

== Politics ==
=== General ===
- Federal monarchy, a federation of monarchies
- Federation, or Federal state (federal system), a type of government characterized by both a central (federal) government and states or regional governments that are partially self-governing; a union of states
- Federal republic, a federation which is a republic
- Federalism, a political philosophy
- Federalist, a political belief or member of a political grouping
- Federalization, implementation of federalism
- The Federal, an Indian news website

=== Particular governments ===
- Government of Argentina
- Government of Australia
- Federal government of Brazil
- Government of Canada
- Federal Government of Germany
- Federal government of Iraq
- Government of India
- Federal government of Mexico
- Federal government of Nigeria
- Government of Pakistan
- Government of the Philippines
- Government of Russia
- Government of South Africa
- Federal government of the United States
  - United States federal law
  - United States federal courts
- Federal government of Malaysia

=== Other ===
- The Federalist Papers, critical early arguments in favor of approving the United States Constitution
- Federal Party (disambiguation), various political parties

== Places ==
- Federal, Entre Ríos, a city in Argentina
- Federal, New South Wales, a town in Australia
- Federal, Pleasants County, West Virginia, an unincorporated community in the United States
- Federal, Queensland, a town in Australia
- Federal Corners, New York, a hamlet in New York
- Colonia Federal, a neighborhood in Mexico City

== Transportation ==
- Federal (Amtrak), a passenger train providing an overnight Boston-Washington, D.C. service in 2003 and 2004
- Federal Express (train), a passenger train operated by the New Haven and Pennsylvania railroads
- Federal Corporation, a Taiwanese tyre manufacturer
- FedEx, a logistical services/delivery company based in the United States of America
- Federal Motor Truck Company, an American truck manufacturer headquartered in Detroit, Michigan (1910–1959)

== Entertainment ==
- Federal (E-40 album), the debut album by rapper E-40
- Federal (SINN6R album), 2025
- Federal (film), a 2010 thriller film starring Selton Mello
- Federal Records, a subsidiary label of King Records

== Other uses ==
- Federal architecture, an architectural style related to Biedermayer, Recency and Empire-style architecture
  - Federal furniture, American furniture produced in the same era
- Special agent, person that works for a federal agency in United States
- Federal Premium Ammunition, an American ammunition manufacturer
- Federal Reserve, the central bank of the United States
- C.D. Federal, a Honduran football club
- OFK Federal, a defunct Montenegrin football club
- Federal's, a defunct U.S. department store

== See also ==
- Fed (disambiguation)
- Federale (disambiguation)
- Federalism (disambiguation)
- Federalist (disambiguation)
- Federation (disambiguation)
- Federal Union (disambiguation)
