= Fede =

Fede is a surname, a masculine given name and a short form (hypocorism) of other given names, such as Federico. It may refer to:

== Surname ==
- Emilio Fede (1931–2025), Italian anchorman
- Giuseppe Fede (died 1777), Italian nobleman, collector and archaeologist
- Terrence Fede (born 1991), American football player

== Given name or nickname ==
- Fede Galizia (c. 1578–c. 1630), Italian Renaissance painter
- Fede Castaños (born 1959), Spanish footballer
- Fede Álvarez (football) (born 1974), Mexican football coach
- Fede Álvarez (born 1978), Uruguayan filmmaker
- Federico Bessone (born 1984), Argentine footballer also known as Fede Bessone
- Federico Ágreda Álvarez (born 1985), Italian-Venezuelan music producer.
- Fede Vico (born 1994), Spanish footballer
- Fede Vigevani (born 1994 or 1995), Uruguayan YouTuber and musician
- Fede San Emeterio (born 1997), Spanish footballer

== See also ==
- Fede ring, ring in which two hands meet and are clasped
- Fedde, another surname and given name
- Fed (disambiguation)
- Fedi
- FIDE
- Fides (disambiguation)
