= Federal Union (disambiguation) =

A federal union is a political system of government.

Federal Union may also refer to a number of political movements:

- Federal Union (est. 1938), a British political group advocating European federalism
- Federal Union (Germany) (Föderalistische Union, 1951–1957), a West German parliamentary alliance of center-right Christian and regional parties around the Zentrum
- Federalist Union (Unione Federalista), a former name (1994–1995) of the Federalist Party (1994–2008), an Italian political party
- Federal Union Army (est. 2011), an insurgent coalition in Myanmar
- Federal Union Party (est. 2013), a Burmese political party

== See also ==
- The Federal Union (1937), an American book about the history of the United States
- Federal Party (disambiguation)
- Union Party (disambiguation)
- Unionist Party (disambiguation)
- Federal (disambiguation)
- Federalism (disambiguation)
- Federalist (disambiguation)
- Federation (disambiguation)
