= Scottish Unionist Party =

Scottish Unionist Party may refer to:

- Unionist Party (Scotland) (1912-1965), sometimes known outside Scotland as the Scottish Unionist Party
- Scottish Unionist Party (1986), a small political party in Scotland, from the mid-1980s to the present day

== See also ==
- Scottish Conservative and Unionist Party
- Unionism in Scotland
