= Federal agent =

Federal agent may refer to an agent or officer from one of the following:

== Australia ==
- Australian Federal Police

== United States ==
- Federal law enforcement in the United States
- Federal Bureau of Investigation
- Bureau of Alcohol, Tobacco, Firearms and Explosives
- United States Immigration and Customs Enforcement
- United States Customs and Border Protection
- United States Border Patrol
- United States Secret Service
- Drug Enforcement Administration
- United States Marshals Service
- Diplomatic Security Service
- Naval Criminal Investigative Service
- Air Force Office of Special Investigations
- Defense Criminal Investigative Service

== Media ==
- Federal Agent (film), a 1936 American crime film

== See also ==
- Fed (disambiguation)
- Government agent (disambiguation)
