= Fedde =

Fedde is both a surname and a given name. Notable people with the name include:

== Surname ==
- Elizabeth Fedde (1850–1921), Norwegian Lutheran deaconess and founder of the Norwegian Relief Society
- Erick Fedde (born 1993), American Major League Baseball pitcher
- Friedrich Karl Georg Fedde (1873–1942), German botanist
- Samuel Simonsen Fedde (1769–1856), Norwegian politician

== Given name ==
- Fedde Le Grand (born 1977), Dutch music producer and DJ
- Fedde Schurer (1898–1968), Dutch poet (in the West Frisian language), schoolteacher, journalist, language activist, politician

== See also ==
- Fede, another surname and given name
