= Federated Serbia =

Federated Serbia may refer to:

- Federated Serbia (1944–1992), a federated state, within the Democratic Federal Yugoslavia (1944-1945), the Federal People's Republic of Yugoslavia (1945-1963), and the Socialist Federal Republic of Yugoslavia (1963-1992)
- Federated Serbia (1992–2006), a federated state, within the Federal Republic of Yugoslavia (1992-2003), and the State Union of Serbia and Montenegro (2003-2006)

== See also ==
- Federated (disambiguation)
- Serbia (disambiguation)
