= Fed =

Fed, The Fed, Feds, or FED may refer to:

== People ==
- Feds, a slang term for a police officer in several countries
- A federal agent (disambiguation)

=== Persons ===
- Andrey A. Fedorov (1908–1987), Soviet Russian biologist, author abbreviation
- John Fedorowicz (born 1958), American International Grandmaster of chess also called "The Fed".
- Roger Federer (born 1981), Swiss tennis player sometimes referred to as "Fed".

== Places ==
- Fort Edward station (Amtrak code FED), New York, United States
- FEDS Xinyi A13, Taipei, Taiwan; a shopping mall
- FEDS Zhubei, Zhubei, Hsinchu, Taiwan; a shopping mall

== Arts, entertainment, media ==
- Fed (album), a 2002 album by American musician Liam Hayes
- "Fed" (song), a song by Liam Hayes, the title track off the eponymous 2002 album Fed (album)
- Feds (film), a 1988 American cop-comedy film

=== Television ===
- "Fed" (Law & Order), episode of the television series Law & Order
- Feds (TV series), a 1997 American legal drama TV show
- The Feds (miniseries), a 1990s Australian TV show
- The Rookie: Feds, a 2022 American cop-drama TV show

== Computing, electronics, software ==
- .fed.us, a domain name for U.S. federal government entities
- Front-end web development
- Field-emission display, a type of flat-panel display

== Sports ==
- Fed Cup, a tournament in women's tennis
- Liverpool Feds W.F.C., a women's soccer team in Liverpool, Merseyside, England, UK
- Brooklyn Feds, a 1910s baseball team in Brooklyn, New York City, New York State, USA
- Federalsburg Feds, a 1949 baseball team in Federalsburg, Maryland, USA

== Groups, organizations, companies ==
- Federation
- Federal government (the feds)
  - Federal government of the United States, the national branch of government in the United States
- Federal Reserve ("The Fed"), the central banking system of the United States, or one of its regional banks (e.g., the "Boston Fed")
- The Fed (newspaper), a student newspaper published at Columbia University
- Federation of Students, University of Waterloo, Waterloo, Ontario, Canada; nicknamed "Feds"
- South Wales Miners' Federation, a Welsh trade union, nicknamed "Fed"

== Other uses ==
- feeding
- FED (camera), a Soviet rangefinder camera
- Fuchs' endothelial dystrophy

== See also ==
- Fedz, a 2013 British crime film
- Fede (disambiguation)
- Federal (disambiguation)
- Federation (disambiguation)
- Feed (disambiguation)
