= Federalist (disambiguation) =

The term federalist describes any of several political beliefs around the world, or the concept of various parties; its members or supporters calling themselves "Federalists".

Federalist may also refer to:

- Federalist architecture, the name for the classicizing architecture built in the newly founded United States between c. 1780 and 1830, and particularly from 1785 to 1815
- Maryland Federalist, a replica of the 18th-century miniature ship Federalist
- The Federalist, now known as The Federalist Papers, a late-1780s collection of articles or essays promoting the ratification of the United States Constitution
- The Federalist (website), a conservative U.S. political website
- The Federalists (band), SFBA-based U.S. indie rock band

== Political parties ==
- Federalist Party, a former political party of the United States
- Federalist Alliance, a former political party of Italy
- Federalista Party, a former political party of the Philippines
- Federalist Unity Party, a political party of Argentina
- Federalists (Georgia), a political party in Georgia
- Democratic Party of Federalists, a political party of Bosnia and Herzegovina
- Union of Federalists and Independent Republicans, a political party of the Democratic Republic of Congo
- Union of Federalist Nationalists of Congo, a political party of the Democratic Republic of Congo
- Breton Federalist League, a former political party of Brittany
- Hungarian Federalist Party, a former political party of Slovakia
- Federalist Italian League, a former political party of Italy
- Turkic Federalist Party, a former political party of Azerbaijan
- Tuscan Federalist Alliance, or Lega Toscana, a political party of Tuscany
- The Federalist Party of the Yale Political Union, a conservative party in a debate society

== See also ==
- Federalist Society, U.S. conservative organisation seeking constitutional and legal reform
- Federalist Era (1789–1801), U.S. political era
- Federalism (category)
  - Federalism, a mode of government
- Anti-Federalist, a former political movement in the U.S.
- Anti-Federalist League, a cross-party organisation in the United Kingdom
- Federalist revolts, 1793 uprisings in France
- Federal (disambiguation)
- Federation (disambiguation)
- Federalism (disambiguation)
- Federal Union (disambiguation)
