= Unionist =

Unionist may refer to:

- A member or supporter of a trade union

== Europe ==
=== British Isles ===
- Unionism in the United Kingdom
- Unionism in England
- Unionism in Ireland
- Unionism in Wales
- Unionism in Scotland
- Unionist Party (Scotland)
- Scottish Conservative & Unionist Association
- Conservative and Unionist Party, known simply as Conservatives

=== Other places in Europe ===
- Unification of Moldova and Romania, Romanian-Moldovan Unionists
- Spanish unionism
- Committee of Union and Progress, commonly CUP or Unionists, Turkey (Ottoman Empire)
- Unionism in Belgium

== Asia ==
- Unionist Party (Punjab), India

== North America ==
- Southern Unionist, a resident of the slave states opposed to secession prior to or during the American Civil War
- Unionist politician (American Civil War)
- Unionist Party (Canada), a merger of parties that led Canada during World War I

== See also ==
- Unionist Party (disambiguation)
- Unionism (disambiguation)
- Union (disambiguation)
