= Fedi =

Fedi is an Italian and Hebrew surname. Notable people with the surnames Fedi and Feddy include:

- Andrea Fedi (born 1991), Italian racing cyclist
- Dario Fedi (born 1989), Italian footballer
- Marco Fedi (born 1958), Italian politician
- Omer Fedi, Israeli producer
- Pio Fedi (1815–1892), Italian sculptor

== See also ==
- Fediverse
- Fede (disambiguation)
