= Partido Federal =

Partido Federal may refer to:

- Federalist Party (Argentina) – a 19th century political party in Argentina
- Federal Party (1973) – a provincial political party in modern Argentina
- Federal Party (Puerto Rico)
- Partido Federal ng Pilipinas – a political party in the Philippines

== See also ==
- Federal Party (disambiguation)
