= Unionism =

Unionism may refer to:

== Trades ==
- Community unionism, the ways trade unions work with community organizations
- Craft unionism, a model of trade unionism in which workers are organised based on a particular craft or trade
- Dual unionism, the development of a union or political organization parallel to and within an existing labor union
- Industrial unionism, a labor union organizing method in which all workers in the same industry are organized into the same union
- New Unionism, a term which has been used twice in the history of the labour movement to describe moves to broaden the union agenda
- Open-source unionism, a term coined by academics Richard B. Freeman and Joel Rogers to explain a possible new model for organizing workers
- Social Movement Unionism, a trend of theory and practice in contemporary trade unionism
- Solidarity unionism, a model of labour organizing in which the workers themselves formulate strategy and take action
- The organization of workers in trade unions

== Politics ==
- Preference for maintaining a political union as opposed to separatism
- Unionism in Belgium
- Union (American Civil War)
- Ittihadism, ideology of the Committee of Union and Progress in the Ottoman Empire
- Unification of Moldova and Romania, advocates are referred to as "Unionists"
- Albanian unionism
- Serbian–Montenegrin unionism
- Spanish unionism

=== In the British Isles ===
- Unionism in the United Kingdom, support for the UK constituent countries remaining part of the United Kingdom state
- Unionism in Ireland, support for Ireland (mainly Northern Ireland) being part of the UK, rather than a Republic of Ireland or an independent Northern Ireland
- Unionism in Scotland, support for Scotland remaining part of the UK
- Unionism in England, support for England remaining part of the UK
- Unionism in Wales, support for Wales remaining part of the UK

== Education ==
- The organization of students in students' unions
- Voluntary student unionism, a policy under which membership of student unions is voluntary

== Religion ==
- Christian ecumenism, initiatives aimed at worldwide Christian unity

== See also ==
- State nationalism
- Unification (disambiguation)
- Unionist (disambiguation)
- Union (disambiguation)
