= Federalism (disambiguation) =

Federalism is a form of government.

Federalism may also refer to:

== Politics ==
- World federalism

=== Africa ===
- Federalism in Nigeria
- Federalism in South Africa

=== Americas ===
- Canadian federalism
- Federalism in Quebec
- Federalism in the United States

=== Asia ===
- Federalism in China
- Federalism in India
- Federalism in Iraq
- Korean federalism
- Federalism in Malaysia
- Federalism in the Philippines
- Federalism in Sri Lanka
- Federalism in Nepal

=== Europe ===
- Balkan federalism
- Belgian federalism
- European federalism
- Federalism in Germany
- Iberian federalism
- Imperial Federalism, of the British Empire
- Federalism in Russia

=== Elsewhere ===
- Federalism in Australia

== See also ==
- New Federalism, in the US
- Journal of Federalism
- Anti-Federalism, in the US
- Dual federalism, in the US
- Federal (disambiguation)
- Federation (disambiguation)
- Federalist (disambiguation)
- Federal Union (disambiguation)
