= Federale =

Federale may refer to:

== Sports ==
- Fédérale 1, the highest level of French amateur rugby union
- Fédérale 2, the second highest level of French amateur rugby union
- Fédérale 3, the third highest level of French amateur rugby union
- Trofeo Federale, a defunct association football cup in San Marino

== Other uses ==
- Federale (band), a rock band from Portland, Oregon
- Federales, a slang Spanish term for the Mexican Federal Police
- Federales, a colloquial Spanish term for the Federalist Party (Argentina)

== See also ==
- Federal (disambiguation)
