= Federated =

Federated may refer to:

- Federated state, a constituent state within a federal state
- Federated school, a model of administration in some educational institutions
- Federated congregation, a type of religious congregation

== Computing ==
- Federated identity, a type of electronic identity
- Federated learning, a machine learning technique
- Federated protocol, in networking, the ability for users to send messages from one network to another
- Federated architecture, a pattern in enterprise architecture
- Federated search, a type of electronic search
- Federated database system, a type of meta-database management system
- Federated content, a type of digital media content

== Other ==
- Federated Tower, a skyscraper in Pittsburgh, Pennsylvania
- Federated Department Stores, now known as the Macy's, Inc.
- Federated Group, a 1980s era chain of home electronics retailers
- Federated Investors, a financial services company in Pittsburgh, Pennsylvania, now Federated Hermes

== See also ==
- Federal (disambiguation)
- Federation (disambiguation)
- The fediverse, a federated social network
