= The Federation =

The Federation may refer to:

- Federation of Bosnia and Herzegovina, often just called "The Federation", a part of the country of Bosnia and Herzegovina
- Russian Federation
- United Federation of Planets, a fictional alliance in the Star Trek universe often referred to as "The Federation"
- The Federation (Shannara), fictional country from the Shannara series by Terry Brooks
- The Federation (group), a Bay Area hip hop group
- Federation (information technology), a group of computing or network providers agreeing upon standards of operation in a collective fashion

== See also ==
- Federation (disambiguation)
