= Federation (disambiguation) =

A federation is a state governed under the system of federalism.

Federation may also refer to:

== Political science ==
- Arab Federation of Iraq and Jordan, a short-lived country formed in 1958 from the union of Iraq and Jordan
- Balkan Federation, a left-wing late 19th century project
- Federation of Arab Emirates of the South, an organization of states within the British Aden Protectorate in what would become South Yemen, 1959 to 1962
- Federation of Arab Republics, an attempt to merge Libya, Egypt and Syria in order to create a United Arab state, 1972 to 1977
- Federation of Australia, the union of six self-governing colonies to form the Commonwealth of Australia in 1901
- Federation of Bosnia and Herzegovina, one of the two political entities that compose Bosnia and Herzegovina, in existence since 1994
- Federation of Ethiopia and Eritrea or Ethiopian–Eritrean Federation, a federation of the Ethiopian Empire and Eritrea, 1952 to 1962
- Federation of Malaya an Asian nation that existed from 31 January 1948 until 16 September 1963
- Federation of Nigeria, a predecessor to modern-day Nigeria from 1954 to 1963
- Federation of Rhodesia and Nyasaland, also known as the Central African Federation, an African nation in existence from 1953 to 1963
- Federation of South Arabia, formed from the 15 protected states of the Federation of Arab Emirates of the South, 1962 to 1967
- Mali Federation (Fédération du Mali), a West African federation linking the French colonies of Sénégal and the Sudanese Republic (or French Sudan, the future Mali), 1959 to 1960
- Non-governmental federations, organizations governed by federalism
- Russian Federation, the official name for Russia since 1991
- West Indies Federation, also known as the Federation of the West Indies or the West Indian Federation, a political union of various Caribbean islands that were colonies of the United Kingdom, 1958 to 1962

== Fictional federations ==
- The Earth Federation (Gundam), a fictional governing body of the Universal Century Gundam anime series
- The Federation, the main antagonist from Battle Garegga
- The Federation, a futuristic "US-style" superpower, one of three such powers in the game Elite: Dangerous
- The Federation (Shannara), fictional country from the Shannara series by Terry Brooks
- The Galactic Federation, a fictional organisation featured in the Doctor Who serials The Curse of Peladon and The Monster of Peladon
- The Galactic Federation (Metroid), the main governing body in the Metroid video game series
- The Federation of the Americas, a fictional country from Call of Duty: Ghosts in the Call of Duty video game series
- Terran Federation, the fictional totalitarian government centred on Earth in the British television series Blake's 7
- The Terran Federation (Starship Troopers) and United Citizens' Federation from the novel and film Starship Troopers
- Trade Federation, a galaxy-wide megacorporation in Star Wars
- United Federation of Planets, the fictional federation which encompasses approximately 150 planets in Star Trek

== Sports ==
- Sports federation, sports organization that has a regulatory or sanctioning function
- International Basketball Federation (FIBA), an association of national organizations which governs the sport of basketball worldwide
- World Chess Federation (FIDE), an international chess organization
- Federation of International Football Associations (FIFA), international soccer organization
- WWE Federation Champion, a world heavyweight wrestling championship
- World Wrestling Federation Entertainment (WWE), an American integrated media and entertainment company
- Badminton World Federation (BWF) is the badminton international governing body
- International Federation of BodyBuilding & Fitness, an international professional sports governing body for bodybuilding and fitness

== Other uses ==
- American Federation of Labor (AFL), a former national federation of labor unions in the United States
- American Federation of Labor-Congress of Industrial Organizations (AFL–CIO), the largest federation of unions in the United States
- World Federation of Exchanges (WFE), international trade association of publicly regulated stock, futures, and options exchanges
- Federation (information technology), the standardization of information systems, or their means of inter-connection
- WS-Federation, an identity specification
- Federation (novel), a 1994 science fiction novel by Judith and Garfield Reeves-Stevens
- Federation (miniseries), 1998 documentary film about federation of Australia
- The Federation (band), a Bay Area hip-hop collective
- Federation II, a text-based online RPG
- Federation architecture, an Australian architectural style (c. 1890 – c. 1915)
- Planned Parenthood Federation of America (PPFA), organization that provides reproductive health care
- Federation of Damanhur, a community situated in the Piedmont region of northern Italy
- Solidarity Federation, a political organization in the United Kingdom
- Federation Bells, an artistic installation comprising 39 upturned bells, located in Birrarung Marr, Melbourne
- School federation (England and Wales), a partnership between schools in England and Wales
- Federation Council, New South Wales, a local government area in Australia

== See also ==
- The Federation (disambiguation)
- Galactic Federation (disambiguation)
- Federal (disambiguation)
- Federated (disambiguation)
- Federalism (disambiguation)
- Federalist (disambiguation)
- Federal Union (disambiguation)
