= Federal, Pleasants County, West Virginia =

Unincorporated community in West Virginia, United States

Federal
- Unincorporated community
- Location within the state of West Virginia Federal (the United States)
- Coordinates: 39°23′33″N 81°5′12″W
- Country: United States
- State: West Virginia
- County: Pleasants
- Elevation: 1,076 ft (328 m)
- Time zone: UTC-5 (Eastern (EST))
  - Summer (DST): UTC-4 (EDT)
- GNIS ID: 1678514

Federal was an unincorporated community in Pleasants County, West Virginia, United States. The Federal Post Office no longer exists.
