= The Federalists (band) =

American rock band

- The Federalists performing at the Great American Music Hall in San Francisco, CA

Background information
- Origin: Concord, California
- Genre: Indie rock
- Years active: 2005-present
- Label: Talking House Records
- Members: Luke Franks; Dustin Smith; Brandt Walker; Chris Cooper; Clark Abbott
- Website: www.the-federalists.com

The Federalists are an American rock band based in the San Francisco Bay Area. The band was formed in September 2005 when singer-songwriter Luke Franks decided to piece together a band to perform the songs he had been working on independently. He asked drummer Dustin Smith, and bass player Brandt Walker (from Franks' previous band Yours Truly). The Federalists have released three studio albums.

The Federalists' music has been inspired by a wide variety of artists and styles, including Wilco, Bob Dylan and The Beatles. Their music has been called everything from indie to classic rock, alt. country, and classic pop.

In 2008, with the release of their second full length Self-Titled record, The Federalists received numerous music reviews by local and nationally respected indie press including; Diablo Magazine, The Big Takeover, Recording Magazine, East Bay Express, and Performer Magazine. The single from their 2008 record, 'City Girl', received support from Bay Area radio stations such as; LIVE 105, KFOG, and 107.7 The Bone. LIVE 105 music director Aaron Axelsen was so impressed by The Federalists second record he asked them to play at BFD, LIVE 105's annual music festival at the Shoreline Amphitheater in June 2008. This started a progression of great show offers for The Federalists in the remainder of 2008. The Federalists provided the main support for Or, The Whale at Great American Music Hall in San Francisco and opened for Santana at the Sleep Train Pavilion in Concord, California.

== Discography ==
=== Full length albums ===
- The Federalists(2006)—self-released, July 1, 2006
- The Federalists (2008)—self-released, February 12, 2008
- The Way We Ran—Talking House Records, November 3, 2009

=== EPs ===
- 12 Galaxies EP (2007)—January 20, 2007

=== Compilations ===
- Guitars Not Guns Compilation Vol.1, "Never Saw It Coming"—Red House Studios, October 29, 2006
- A Foggy Holiday - Carols From The SF Scene, Vol. 2, "Christmas (Baby, Please Come Home)"—Talking House Records, November 18, 2008

== Members ==
- Luke Franks - vocals, guitar (2005–present)
- Dustin Smith - drums (2005–present)
- Brandt Walker - bass (2005–present)
- Jason Roysdon - guitar (2005–present)
- Clark Abbott - guitar, vocals (2008–present)
- Chris Cooper - keys (2008–present)
