= Federal Party =

Federal Party may refer to:

- Federal Party (1973), a provincial political party in modern Argentina
- Federal Party (Philippines), political parties in the Philippines from 1953 to 1961 and 1981
- Federal Party (Puerto Rico)
- Federal Party (Rhodesia and Nyasaland)
- Federal Party (Sri Lanka)
- Federalist Party, United States
- Federalist Party (Argentina), a 19th-century political party in Argentina
- Federalist Party (Austria)
- Federalist Party (France)
- Federalist Party (Italy)
- Federalista Party, an early 20th century political party in the Philippines
- Federal Party of Manipur (India)
- Southern Sudan Federal Party

== See also ==
- Partido Federal (disambiguation)
- Taxpayers Party of New York, later party that used the Federalist Party name for one candidate in 2011
- Federal Union (disambiguation)
