= Unionist Party =

Unionist Party may refer to:

== Canada ==
- Unionist Party (Canada), existed from 1917 to 1920
- Unionest Party

== Croatia ==
- Unionist Party (Kingdom of Croatia), existed from 1861 to 1918

== Denmark ==
=== Faroe Islands ===
- Union Party (Faroe Islands)

=== Greenland ===
- Unionist Party (Greenland)

== Egypt ==
- National Progressive Unionist Party

== Guatemala ==
- Unionist Party (Guatemala, 1920)
- Unionist Party (Guatemala)

== India (under British rule) ==
- Unionist Party (Punjab), a major political party in the former Punjab Province until 1947

== Nicaragua ==
- Central American Unionist Party

== South Africa ==
- Unionist Party (South Africa)

== Thailand ==
- Sahaphum Party ("Unionist Party" in English)

== Tunisia ==
- Unionist Democratic Union

== United Kingdom ==
- Conservative and Unionist Party, the formal name of the Conservative Party
- Liberal Unionist Party, existed from 1886 to 1912
  - Unionist government, 1895–1905, a coalition government of the two parties

=== Northern Ireland ===
==== Current organisations ====
- Democratic Unionist Party (DUP), the larger of the two main unionist political parties in Northern Ireland
- Ulster Unionist Party (UUP), the smaller and more moderate of the two main unionist political parties in Northern Ireland
- Progressive Unionist Party (PUP), minor loyalist party formed in 1979
- Traditional Unionist Voice (TUV), minor loyalist party formed in 2007
- Ulster Unionist Labour Association (or Labour Unionist Party)

==== Defunct organisations ====
- Protestant Unionist Party, former political party formed by Ian Paisley in 1966 out of the Ulster Protestant Action (UPA) movement
- Independent Unionist Association (or Independent Unionist Party), existed from 1937 to late 1940s
- Vanguard Unionist Progressive Party (Ulster Vanguard), existed from 1973 and 1978
- Unionist Party of Northern Ireland, existed from 1974 and 1981
- United Ulster Unionist Party, existed from 1975 and 1982, splinted from the Vanguard Progressive Unionist Party due to a disagreement over power-sharing
- Ulster Popular Unionist Party, existed from 1980 to 1995
- UK Unionist Party, existed 1995 to 2008
- Northern Ireland Unionist Party, existed 1999 to 2008

=== Scotland ===
- Unionist Party (Scotland), centre-right party which existed between 1912 and 1965, the dominant force in Scottish politics until the late 1950s
- Scottish Conservative and Unionist Party, the full name of the party since 1965 more often called the Scottish Conservative Party
- Scottish Unionist Party (1986), Scottish minor party of traditionalist Unionists disillusioned with the Conservative government's signing of the Anglo-Irish Agreement

== United States ==
- Union Party (United States, 1850), a political party created to support the Compromise of 1850
- Constitutional Union Party (United States), a party notable for its role in the 1860 presidential election
- Unionist politician (American Civil War)
- National Union Party (United States), a national political coalition during the American Civil War
- Unconditional Union Party, a Civil War–era party in the border states
- Union Party (Kansas), a Civil War–era party in Kansas
- Union Party (United States), a political party during the Great Depression

== See also ==
- Unionism (disambiguation)
- Unionist (disambiguation)
- Separatism
