= Fede Álvarez (football) =

Mexican association football manager

Personal information
- Full name: Federico Álvarez Velasco
- Date of birth: July 31, 1974 (age 52)
- Place of birth: Mexico City, Mexico

Managerial career
- Years: Team
- 2004–2007: Woodland SC - USA
- 2008: WSHS - USA
- 2009–2010: Club de Fútbol Asturias
- 2012: Santos Laguna
- 2013–2014: Santos Laguna

Fede Álvarez (born July 31, 1974, in Mexico City) is a Mexican association football manager. He graduated with honors in 2010 from the National Coaching School, run by the Mexican Football Federation.

== Coaching career ==
He is known for his coaching work done in Santos Laguna youth development as head coach of U17 and U20 teams. During his coaching time at Santos Laguna, the team was successful at tournaments in Italy, Sweden, and in his hometown in Mexico. While studying to become a pro license coach, he has become the only student ever to be invited to a FIFA Futuro III Course for Coaches Instructors, sharing his knowledge and ideas with already successful coaches from the national and international scene. In 2011, he gave an Innovation Course for future Pro Coaches as part of the National Coaching School program of the Mexican Football Federation in Mexico city. Between 2012 and 2014 he worked for Santos Laguna, first as an Assistant Coach - U20's for one season, and then as Head Coach - U17's for three seasons.
