= Government agent =

Government agent may refer to:

- Someone who works for a government
- Specifically, in Sri Lanka, a type of civil servant; see Government Agent (Sri Lanka)

== See also ==
- G-Man (slang)
- Special agent
