= Samuel Simonsen Fedde =

Norwegian politician

Samuel Simonsen Fedde (1769–1856) was a Norwegian politician.

He was elected to the Norwegian Parliament in 1818, representing the rural constituency of Lister og Mandals Amt. He sat through only one term.

Hailing from Feda in the prestegjeld of Kvinesdal, he worked as a sub-postmaster there. He died in 1856.
