= Unionism in England =

A map of England (dark red) within the United Kingdom (light red)

In England, Unionism is a political ideology which favours the continuation of some form of political union between England and the other Countries of the United Kingdom, (Scotland, Wales and Northern Ireland). As well as the current state of the United Kingdom, It is part of the wider British unionist movement and is closely linked to the notion of Britishness. Unionism in England is characterised by both opposition to England's independence as a separate state and the belief that Scotland, Wales and Northern Ireland should continue to be constituent countries of the Union.

== The Union ==
The political union between the Kingdoms of England (also including Wales as an English possession) and Scotland was created by the Acts of Union, passed in the parliaments of both kingdoms in 1707 and 1706 respectively, which united the governments of what had previously been independent states (though they had shared the same monarch in a personal union since 1603) under the Parliament of Great Britain. The Union was brought into existence under the Acts of Union on 1 May 1707.

With the Act of Union 1800, the Kingdom of Ireland united with Great Britain into what then formed the United Kingdom of Great Britain and Ireland. The history of the Unions is reflected in various stages of the Union Flag, which forms the flag of the United Kingdom. The larger part of Ireland left the United Kingdom in 1922, however the partition of Ireland which originally occurred under the Government of Ireland Act 1920 was upheld by the British Government and the Unionist-controlled devolved Parliament of Northern Ireland, and chose to remain within the state today, which is now officially termed the United Kingdom of Great Britain and Northern Ireland. The 300th anniversary of the union of Scotland and England was marked in 2007.

== Support in England for the Union ==
The Union Flag, in addition to being the flag of the United Kingdom, also serves as a significant symbol of British Unionism.

In England, support for the Union has traditionally been high, while support for a separate English state has conversely been relatively low. However, the rise of English nationalism has seen a decrease in support for the United Kingdom, although English nationalism does not necessarily advocate English independence from the United Kingdom. In November 2006, an ICM poll, commissioned by the Sunday Telegraph, showed that support for full English independence had reached 48% of those questioned. However, two polls conducted in 2007 and 2013 showed that English support for the Union was stable and high, with 78% opposed to English independence in 2013. Modern political issues such as the West Lothian question and the use of English tax money to subsidise other countries in the Union have acted as restraints on the traditionally high Unionist sentiment in England.

The comfortable status of the Union in England is reflected by a lower level of controversy surrounding the use of British national symbols (such as the Union flag) in England than is seen in Scotland and Northern Ireland. Events held in England, such as the Last Night of the Proms and the Golden and Diamond Jubilee celebrations demonstrate a clear confidence in the notion of Britishness in England. Unionism saw a resurgence in vocalism during the summer of 2014 as a result of the prospect of Scottish independence. Many notable English celebrities and community leaders openly supported the continuation of the Union, and large pro-Union rallies were held in London, Bristol, Manchester and Leeds. A Unionist rally held in Trafalgar Square on 15 September 2014 was the largest specifically pro-Union event held in England to date. It was attended by celebrities and politicians such as Eddie Izzard, Dan Snow, Bob Geldof and Nick Clegg.

== Unionism and political parties ==
Political support for the Union is widespread, with all major political parties in England advocating unionism. Support for the Union is found in political parties on both the right and left of English politics.

=== Unionist political parties in England ===
- Conservative Party
- Labour Party
- Liberal Democrats
- UK Independence Party
- Reform UK

=== Parties opposed to Union ===
- English Democrats
- England First Party

== See also ==
- Unionism in the United Kingdom
  - In Ireland
  - In Scotland
  - In Wales
