= Unionism in Wales =

Location of Wales in the United Kingdom

Unionism in Wales is the political view that supports a political union between Wales and the other countries of the United Kingdom (England, Scotland and Northern Ireland). As well as the current state of the UK, unionism may also include support for Federalism in the United Kingdom and a United Kingdom Confederation.

== History ==
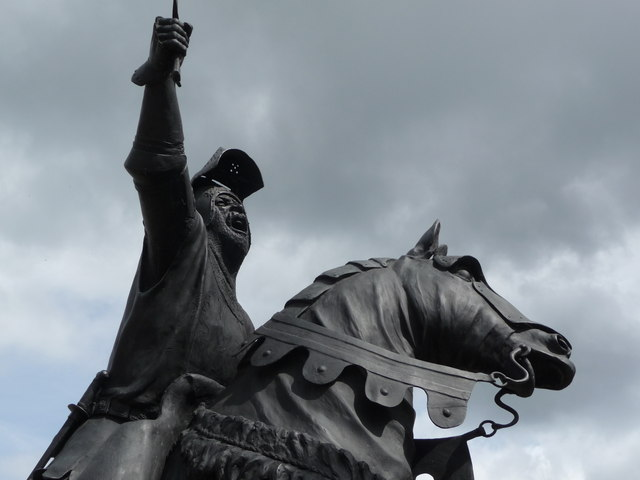
Owain Glyndwr statue in Corwen.

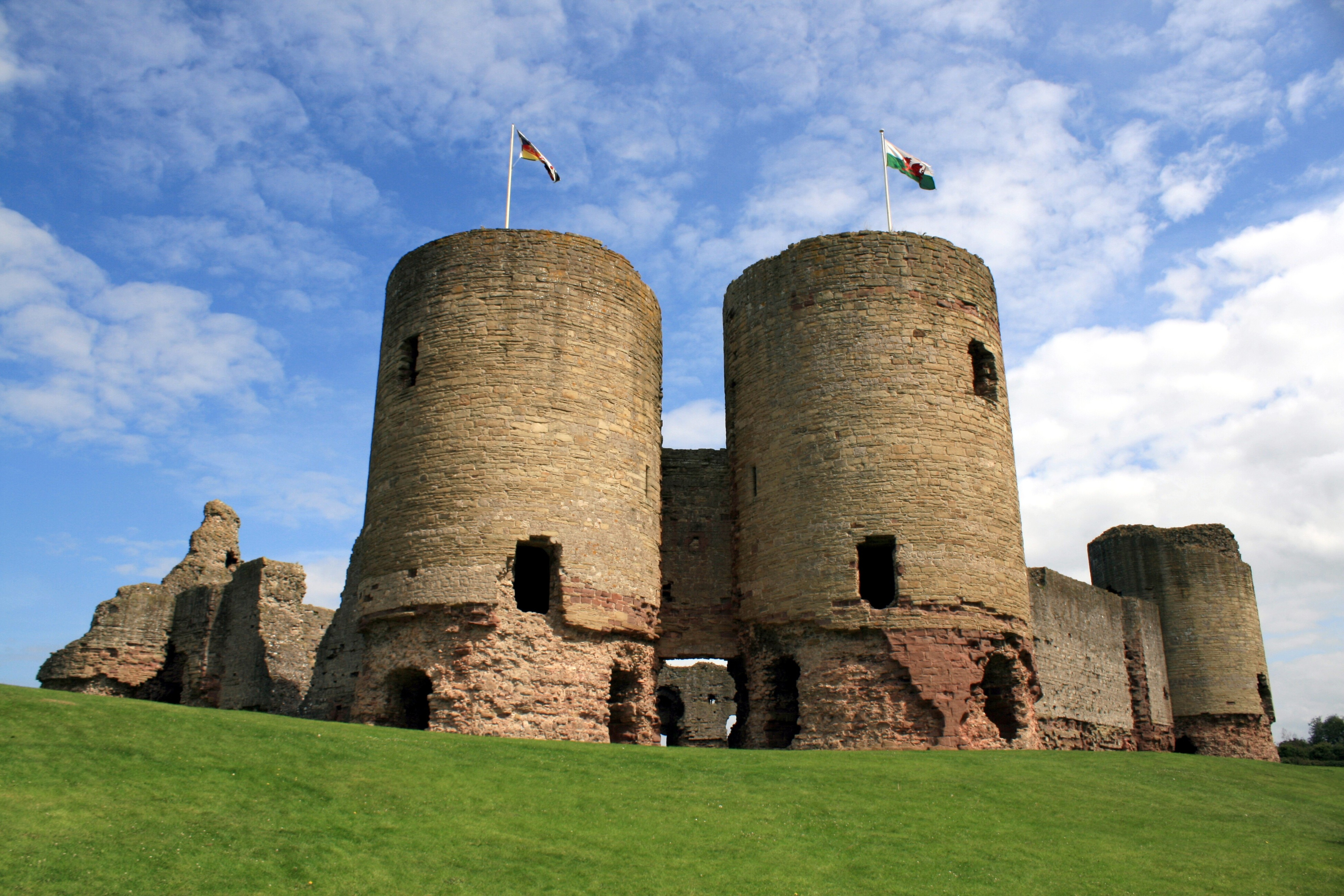
Rhuddlan Castle, where the 1284 Statute of Rhuddlan was promulgated

Edward I of England conquered Wales in 1283. The royal ordinance of the Statute of Rhuddlan in 1284 annexed Wales to England.

Henry VIII of England introduced the Laws in Wales Acts 1535-1542, making the Welsh citizens of the realm, and giving them representation in parliament for the first time. These acts also abolished the Welsh legal system of Hywel Dda, and the Welsh language could not be used for official purposes. The laws also defined the England-Wales border for the first time. The Marcher Lordships and Principality of Wales, divided by conquest, were reunited.

The political union between the Kingdoms of England and Scotland was created through the Act of Union 1707. This united the two previously independent states, which had shared the same monarch in a personal union since 1603, under the Parliament of Great Britain. With the Act of Union 1800, the Kingdom of Ireland united with Great Britain to become the United Kingdom of Great Britain and Ireland. After the partition of Ireland, through which most of Ireland left the United Kingdom in 1922, the state became the United Kingdom of Great Britain and Northern Ireland.

The history of the unions is reflected in various stages of the Union Jack, which forms the flag of the United Kingdom. As Wales had been annexed and was deemed a principality, it was not distinguished from England within the national flag.

=== Devolution ===
The UK is administered as a unitary state, but in the early 1990s, Labour became committed to devolution for both Scotland and Wales, and in 1997 it was elected with a mandate to hold referendums on a Scottish Parliament and a Welsh Assembly. The proposed assembly won a narrow majority in the 1997 referendum. The political climate was very different from that of 1979, with a new generation of Welsh MPs in Westminster and a broad consensus on the previously divisive issue of the Welsh language. In 1997, a second referendum, following the 1979 referendum, on devolution, saw the Welsh electorate vote narrowly in favour of establishing a National Assembly for Wales by 50.3 per cent, on a 50.2 per cent turnout. In 2011 a referendum was held to determine whether Wales should be devolved further powers. The Welsh electorate voted in favour of further powers by 63.5% to 36.5%.

== In Wales ==
Support in Wales for the Union has historically showed majority polling, in part due to the country's strong economic and cultural links to England, with which it shares a long border, as well as the traditional dominance of the pro-Union Labour Party in Wales' most heavily industrialised areas. While there was growth in nationalist sentiment, there was little appetite for home rule and independence in Wales during the 19th and early 20th centuries, at a time when independence movements in Ireland and Scotland were gaining support. Support for the Union has since declined somewhat, reflected in the political inroads made by pro-independence Plaid Cymru.

The flags of The United Kingdom and Wales

== Polling in Wales ==
In 2007, almost 70% of people in Wales supported remaining part of the UK whilst 20% were in favour of Welsh independence. Since 2013, support for remaining in the UK has been between 49% and 74% of the population. In 2017, a survey by YouGov found that 22% of people polled favoured independence. The highest support for independence was recorded as 46% in April 2021 when excluding don't knows. In June 2022, 25% supported independence whilst 50% were opposed to independence.

== Political parties in favour of unionism ==
=== Parties with parliamentary representation in Wales ===
- Welsh Labour
- Welsh Conservatives
- Welsh Liberal Democrats
- Co-operative Party

=== Other parties ===
- Liberal Party
- UK Independence Party
- Reform UK
- British National Party
- Abolish the Welsh Assembly Party
- Social Democratic Party
- Traditional Unionist Voice
- Socialist Party Wales
- Christian Party

== Political parties in favour of independence ==
=== Parties with parliamentary representation in Wales ===
- Plaid Cymru

=== Other parties ===
- Wales Green Party (in the event a referendum is held on Welsh independence. The party does not actively campaign for independence but has stated it would do so if a referendum was called on the matter)
- Propel
- Gwlad

== See also ==
- Unionism in the United Kingdom:
  - Scotland
  - Ireland
  - England
