= Unionism in Scotland =

Political movement favouring continuance of the UK

Scotland's location (in dark blue) within the United Kingdom (in light blue)

Unionism in Scotland (Scottish Gaelic: Aonachas) is a political movement which favours the continuation of the political union between Scotland, England, Wales and Northern Ireland as one United Kingdom, and hence is opposed to Scottish independence. Scotland is one of four countries of the United Kingdom which has its own devolved government (the Scottish Government) and its own parliament (the Scottish Parliament), as well as representation in the UK Parliament. There are many strands of political Unionism in Scotland, some of which have ties to Unionism and Loyalism in Northern Ireland. The two main political parties in the UK – the Conservatives and Labour — both support Scotland remaining part of the UK.

The Scottish unionism movement consists of many factions with varying political views but which are united in being politically opposed to Scottish independence, which would mean Scotland leaving the UK and becoming an independent state. Political parties which support Scottish independence include: the Scottish National Party (SNP) and the Scottish Greens. The SNP have formed the devolved Scottish Government since 2007. After the SNP won an overall majority in the 2011 Scottish Parliament election, the UK and Scottish governments agreed to hold a referendum on Scottish independence, which was held on 18 September 2014. The three main UK political parties formed the Better Together campaign, supporting Scotland remaining part of the UK. The referendum resulted in a victory for the "No" (unionist) campaign, with 55.3% of votes cast for "No" to Scottish independence, and 44.7% cast for "Yes" to Scottish independence. Following the referendum, Better Together ceased to be active and Scotland in Union was established the following year in March 2015.

== Status of the term ==
Before its merger with the Conservative and Unionist Party in England and Wales in 1965, the Unionist Party in Scotland was often known simply as "Unionist". Both the Conservative and Unionist and Scottish Unionist parties were formed by the merger of Conservatives and Liberal Unionists in 1912. The union referred to is the 1800 Act of Union (between Great Britain and Ireland), not the Acts of Union 1707 (between England and Scotland).

The term may also be used to suggest an affinity with Northern Irish unionism.

The former Secretary of State for Scotland, Michael Moore, has written that he does not call himself a Unionist, despite being a supporter of the union. This he ascribes to the Liberal Democrat position in regard to Home Rule and decentralisation within the United Kingdom, noting that: "for me the concept of 'Unionism' does not capture the devolution journey on which we have travelled in recent years." He suggests the connotations behind Unionism are of adherence to a constitutional status quo.

== History of the Union ==
=== Kingdom of Scotland ===
The independent Kingdom of Scotland (shown in green) in 1190

Scotland emerged as an independent polity during the Early Middle Ages, with some historians dating its foundation from the reign of Kenneth MacAlpin in 843. The independence of the Kingdom of Scotland was fought over between Scottish kings and by the Norman and Angevin rulers of England. A key period in the Kingdom of Scotland's history was a succession crisis that started in 1290, when Edward I of England claimed the Scottish throne. The resulting wars of Scottish Independence which led to Scotland securing its independent status, with Robert the Bruce (crowned in 1306) winning a major confrontation at Bannockburn in 1314.

England, Ireland and Scotland shared the same monarch in a personal union from 1603, when King James VI of Scotland also became King James I of England and Ireland, resulting in the "Union of the Crowns". A political union between the Kingdoms of Scotland, England and Ireland was temporarily formed when the crowns were overthrown as a result of the English Civil War, with Oliver Cromwell ruling over the whole of Great Britain and Ireland as Lord Protector. This period was known as the Protectorate, or to monarchists as the interregnum. The monarchies were subsequently restored in 1660, with Scotland reverting to an independent kingdom sharing the same monarch as England and Ireland.

=== Union between England and Scotland (1707) ===
The thistle, the heraldic badge of Scotland, dimidiated with the Tudor rose of England

The political union between the Kingdoms of Scotland and England (also including Wales) was created by the Acts of Union, passed in the parliaments of both kingdoms in 1707 and 1706 respectively. Causes for this included English fears that Scotland would select a different (Catholic) monarch in future, and the failure of the Scottish colony at Darien.

The Union was brought into existence under the Acts of Union on 1 May 1707, forming a single Kingdom of Great Britain. Scottish Jacobite resistance to the union, led by descendants of James VII of Scotland (II of England), continued until 1746 and the Jacobite defeat at Culloden.

=== Union with Ireland (1801) ===
With the Acts of Union 1800, Ireland united with Great Britain into what then formed the United Kingdom of Great Britain and Ireland. The history of the Unions is reflected in various stages of the Union Flag, which forms the flag of the United Kingdom. Ireland was partitioned in the early 1920s: Southern Ireland, now known as the Republic of Ireland, left the United Kingdom, while Northern Ireland chose to stay within the United Kingdom of Great Britain and Northern Ireland.

=== Devolution (1999) ===
The Liberal Democrats, and their predecessor Liberal Party, have long been supportive of Home Rule as part of a wider belief in subsidiarity and localism. In a mirror image of how the Liberal Democrat Party is itself structured, that party is generally supportive of a federal relationship between the countries of the United Kingdom. The Liberal governments of the late 19th century and early 20th century supported a "home rule all round" policy, which would have meant creating national parliaments in England, Ireland and Scotland with common and external matters (such as defence and foreign affairs) decided by the UK Parliament. A "Government of Scotland Bill" was introduced to the UK Parliament by the Liberal government in 1913, and its second reading was passed in the House of Commons by 204 votes to 159. The bill did not become law, and home rule fell off the agenda after most of Ireland became independent in 1922.

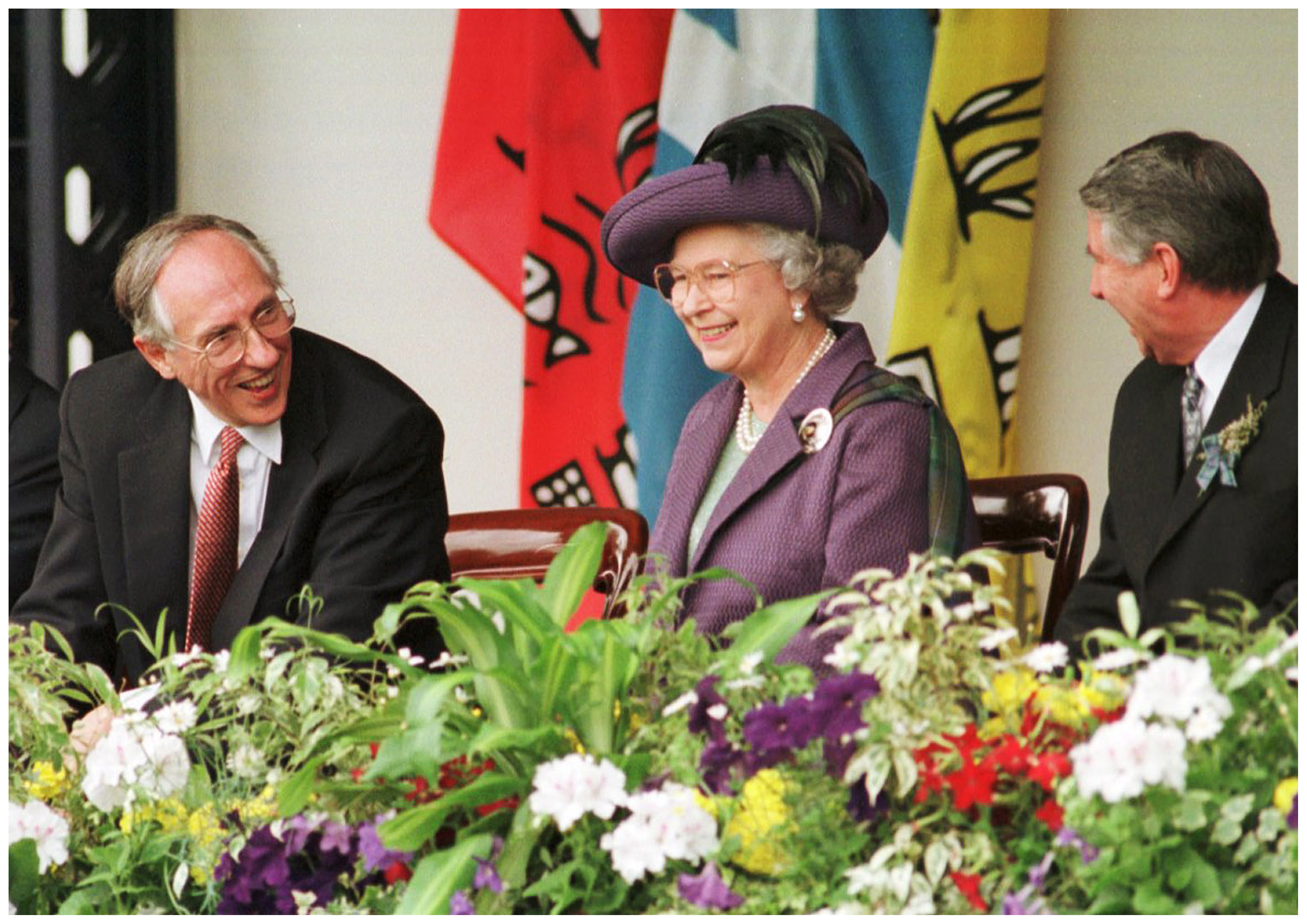
Queen Elizabeth II at the opening of the Scottish Parliament in 1999, alongside First Minister of Scotland Donald Dewar (left) and the Presiding Officer of the Scottish Parliament, David Steel

Following the Kilbrandon Report in 1973, recommending a devolved Scottish Assembly, the Labour government led by Jim Callaghan introduced the Scotland Act 1978. A majority voted in favour of the proposed scheme in a March 1979 referendum on the proposal, but the Act stipulated that 40% of the total electorate had to vote in favour. The result of the referendum did not meet this additional test, and the Labour government decided not to press ahead with devolution. When the party returned to power in 1997, they introduced a second devolution referendum which resulted in the enactment of the Scotland Act 1998 and the creation of the Scottish Parliament.

Unionists took different sides on the debates regarding devolution. Supporters argued that it would strengthen the Union, as giving Scotland self-government would remove the contention that independence was the only way to obtain control over internal affairs. Labour politician George Robertson said that devolution "will kill nationalism stone dead" for this reason. John Smith, a Labour leader who supported devolution, believed it was the "settled will" of the Scottish people. Unionist opponents of devolution argued that granting self-government would inevitably lead to the Union breaking, as they believed it would encourage nationalist sentiment and create tensions within the Union. Labour politician Tam Dalyell said devolution would be a "motorway to independence". His West Lothian question asked why MPs for Scottish constituencies should be able to decide devolved matters (such as health and education) in England, but MPs for English constituencies would have no say over those matters in Scotland.

The Conservatives, as a Britain-wide party, fielded candidates in Scotland until the creation of a separate Unionist Party in 1912. This was a separate party which accepted the Conservative whip in the UK Parliament until it was merged into the Conservative Party in 1965. The Declaration of Perth policy document of 1968 committed the Conservatives to Scottish devolution in some form, and in 1970 the Conservative government published Scotland's Government, a document recommending the creation of a Scottish Assembly. Support for devolution within the party was rejected and was opposed by the Conservative governments led by Margaret Thatcher and John Major in the 1980s and 1990s. The party largely remained opposed to devolution in the 1997 Scottish devolution referendum campaign. That referendum was passed with a large majority, the Conservatives have since accepted devolution in both Scotland and Wales. The governments led by David Cameron devolved further powers to the Scottish Parliament in 2012 and 2016. Cameron also attempted to answer the "West Lothian question" by changing the procedures of the UK Parliament (English votes for English laws).

Notable opponents of unionism are the Scottish National Party (SNP) and the Scottish Green Party. The Scottish Socialist Party (SSP) and Solidarity seek to make Scotland an independent sovereign state and a republic separate from England, Wales and Northern Ireland. Of these parties, only the SNP currently has representation in the UK Parliament, which it has had continuously since winning the 1967 Hamilton by-election. The SNP and the Scottish Greens both have representation within the Scottish Parliament, with the SNP having formed the Scottish Government since 2007.

=== Independence referendum (2014) ===
A map denoting the results of the 2014 Scottish independence referendum sorted by council area, where saturation of colour denotes strength of vote, red denotes 'No' and blue denotes 'Yes'.

The SNP won an overall majority in the 2011 Scottish Parliament election. Following that election, the UK and Scottish Governments agreed that the Scottish Parliament should be given the legal authority to hold an independence referendum by the end of 2014.

The referendum was held on 18 September 2014, asking voters in Scotland the following question: "Should Scotland be an independent country?". At the poll, 2,001,926 voters (55%) rejected the proposal for Scotland to become an independent state over 1,617,989 (45%), who voted in favour of Scottish independence.

The referendum result was accepted by the Scottish and British governments, leading to Scotland remaining a devolved part of the United Kingdom. Further moves have since been made towards increased devolution of power to the Scottish Parliament, which has been incorporated into UK law via the Scotland Act of 2016.

=== Subsequent elections ===
Following the September 2014 referendum, the pro-independence SNP benefitted from increased membership and political support. In the 2015 general election, the SNP won 56 of the 59 seats contested in Scotland, with the three main British parties winning one seat each. The pro-unionist Scottish Conservatives then also saw increased support in the 2016 Scottish Parliament and 2017 UK general elections.

Before the latter election, the Scottish Government (formed by the SNP) had proposed a second Scottish independence referendum, due to the "Leave" victory in the June 2016 referendum on UK membership of the European Union, which the majority of voters in Scotland voted against. The SNP won 35 seats in the 2017 UK general election, a loss of 21 from the 2015 election, with their vote dropping from 50% in 2015 to 37%.

In the 2019 UK general election, SNP support increased to 45% of the vote and they won 48 of the 59 seats contested in Scotland. The election was focused around Brexit, as the Conservative government led by Boris Johnson pledged to "get Brexit done". Despite losing seats in Scotland, the Conservatives won an overall majority and the UK left the European Union on 31 January 2020.

The 2024 general election saw a resurgence of the Unionist Labour Party within Scotland, with the party winning 37 of the 57 Scottish seats at Westminster. The other Unionist parties, the Conservative Party and Liberal Democrats, lost 1 seat and gained 4 seats, respectively. The pro-independence Scottish National Party, meanwhile, the dominant party in Scotland since 2007, saw a collapse of support and lost 40% of its vote share and 39 seats, bringing their total from 48 seats to nine.

== Demographics ==
An academic study surveying 5,000 Scots following the referendum in 2014, found that the "No" campaign performed strongest among elderly, Protestant and middle-income voters. The study also found that the "No" campaign polled ahead among young voters aged between 16 and 24, whilst the "Yes" campaign performed better among men, Roman Catholic voters and voters aged between 25 and 34 years old.

According to Professor John Curtice, polling evidence indicates that support for independence was highest among those aged in their late-20s and early-30s, with a higher "No" vote among those aged between 16 and 24. There was an age gap at the referendum, with elderly voters being the most likely to vote against independence and younger voters aged under 55, with the exception of those aged between 16 and 24, generally being more in favour of independence. Those in C2DE, or "working class", occupations were slightly more likely to vote in favour of independence than those in ABC1, or "middle class", occupations, however, there was a significant discrepancy in voting between those living in the most deprived areas and those living in the least deprived areas, with those in more deprived areas being significantly more likely to vote in favour of independence and those in more affluent areas being more likely to vote against independence. This has been picked up by other academics, with data from the Scottish Index of Multiple Deprivation study from 2012 indicating that the six most deprived local authorities in Scotland returned the highest "Yes" vote shares at the referendum.

=== Geography ===
At the referendum a total of 4 out of 32 council areas voted in favour of independence, these being: North Lanarkshire (51.1% Yes), Glasgow (53.5% Yes), West Dunbartonshire (54.0% Yes) and Dundee (57.3% Yes). The largest No votes were returned by Orkney (67.2% No), Scottish Borders (66.6% No), Dumfries and Galloway (65.7% No) and Shetland (63.7% No). Generally, the Yes campaign performed strongly in deprived urban settings, such as in Greater Glasgow and Dundee, with the No campaign performing better in affluent rural and suburban areas, such as in Aberdeenshire and East Renfrewshire. The campaign saw large shifts in favour of independence in areas traditionally held by Scottish Labour at the Scottish and UK Parliaments, with the Yes campaign performing strongly in Red Clydeside. The No campaign performed better in affluent areas traditionally held by the Scottish Liberal Democrats and Scottish Conservatives such as in East Dunbartonshire and the Scottish Borders. Surprisingly, the No campaign were able to secure a set of sizeable majorities in some council areas which have traditionally voted for the SNP, such as in Moray and Angus, where the "No" vote was 57.6% and 56.3% respectively.

=== Religion ===
Public opinion polling conducted by Lord Ashcroft after the Scottish independence referendum found that approximately 70% of Scotland's Protestant population voted against Scottish independence whereas 57% of Roman Catholics voted in favour of Scottish independence.

=== National identity ===
"British" national identity forms a significant part of the unionist movement in Scotland, with the vast majority of those identifying their national identity more as "British" being in favour of Scotland remaining a part of the United Kingdom, with a smaller majority of those identifying their national identity more as "Scottish" supporting Scottish independence. However, many independence supporters also identify as "British" in varying degrees, with a majority of those describing their national identity as "More Scottish than British" being supportive of Scottish independence.

Map showing the percentage of the population that identifies itself as "Scottish" only according to the 2011 UK Census.

Map showing the percentage of the population that identifies itself as "Scottish and British" and "British" only according to the 2011 UK Census.

A question on national identity was asked in the 2011 UK Census: "what do you feel is your national identity?". Respondents could identify themselves as having more than one national identity.

In the 2011 UK Census:

- 62% identified themselves as 'Scottish only'
- 18% identified themselves as 'Scottish' and 'British'
- 8% identified themselves as 'British only'
- 2% identified themselves as 'Scottish' together with some other identity.
- the remainder chose other national identities.

The council areas with at least 90% of the population stating some 'Scottish' national identity were North Lanarkshire, Inverclyde, East Ayrshire and West Dunbartonshire. The lowest proportions of people stating some 'Scottish' national identity were in Edinburgh (70%) and Aberdeen (75%).

The council areas with the highest proportions of people stating 'British' as their only national identity were Argyll and Bute and Shetland, each with 12%.

Below is a table of national identity sorted by council area based on the results of the 2011 census:

Council area	Scottish only	Scottish and British only	British only	Other UK identities	Scottish and any other identities	Other only
Aberdeen	54.7%	17.7%	8.3%	4.7%	2.5%	12.1%
Aberdeenshire	61.3%	17.7%	9.0%	6.7%	1.9%	3.6%
Angus	66.8%	17.8%	7.2%	4.4%	1.6%	2.2%
Argyll and Bute	57.4%	17.2%	11.6%	8.9%	2.4%	2.4%
Clackmannanshire	67.0%	17.6%	7.4%	4.3%	1.6%	2.1%
Dumfries and Galloway	59.6%	16.7%	10.1%	9.7%	2.0%	1.8%
Dundee	65.5%	16.6%	6.5%	3.6%	1.8%	6.1%
East Ayrshire	70.6%	18.7%	5.7%	2.9%	1.2%	0.9%
East Dunbartonshire	60.2%	24.7%	8.7%	2.7%	1.9%	1.8%
East Lothian	62.6%	18.9%	8.6%	4.6%	2.0%	3.0%
East Renfrewshire	59.0%	25.6%	9.4%	2.4%	1.9%	1.8%
Edinburgh	48.8%	18.5%	11.4%	6.7%	3.2%	11.4%
Eilean Siar	69.2%	14.3%	8.1%	5.4%	1.5%	1.4%
Falkirk	68.0%	19.7%	6.3%	2.7%	1.3%	2.0%
Fife	63.8%	18.2%	7.9%	5.1%	1.8%	3.2%
Glasgow	61.9%	16.1%	8.6%	2.9%	2.2%	8.3%
Highland	61.5%	15.2%	10.2%	7.6%	2.3%	3.3%
Inverclyde	69.9%	19.7%	6.3%	1.9%	1.1%	1.1%
Midlothian	68.3%	18.2%	6.8%	3.2%	1.5%	2.0%
Moray	58.4%	15.9%	10.9%	10.0%	2.1%	2.7%
North Ayrshire	68.2%	19.4%	6.8%	3.2%	1.3%	1.1%
North Lanarkshire	71.6%	18.1%	5.9%	1.5%	1.2%	1.7%
Orkney	62.4%	13.8%	10.8%	9.8%	1.6%	1.6%
Perth and Kinross	59.0%	18.9%	9.5%	6.0%	2.3%	4.3%
Renfrewshire	65.9%	21.0%	7.3%	2.0%	1.3%	2.6%
Scottish Borders	57.7%	16.9%	10.7%	9.2%	2.6%	2.9%
Shetland	59.9%	15.7%	11.6%	7.6%	1.8%	3.4%
South Ayrshire	63.9%	21.0%	7.6%	4.3%	1.6%	1.6%
South Lanarkshire	67.2%	20.5%	6.9%	2.3%	1.3%	1.8%
Stirling	57.5%	20.0%	9.6%	5.8%	2.5%	4.6%
West Dunbartonshire	72.0%	17.3%	6.0%	2.0%	1.1%	1.5%
West Lothian	65.2%	18.8%	7.6%	3.4%	1.6%	3.4%

==== Scottish Social Attitudes Survey ====
Below are findings from the Scottish Social Attitudes Survey, which is an annual survey of public opinion in Scotland from a representative sample of 1,200–1,500 people conducted in conjunction with organisations such as the BBC and various governmental departments, such as the Department for Communities and Local Government and the Department for Business Innovation and Skills.

===== 'Moreno' national identity =====
Respondents were asked to select the "National identity that best describes the way respondent thinks of themselves?"

Year	1979	1992	1999	2000	2001	2003	2005	2006	2007	2009	2010	2011	2012	2013	2014
Scottish not British	19%	23%	32%	37%	36%	31%	32%	33%	26%	27%	28%	28%	23%	25%	23%
More Scottish than British	40%	38%	35%	31%	30%	34%	32%	32%	29%	31%	30%	32%	30%	29%	26%
Equally Scottish and British	33%	27%	22%	21%	24%	22%	21%	21%	27%	26%	26%	23%	30%	29%	32%
More British than Scottish	3%	4%	3%	3%	3%	4%	4%	4%	5%	4%	4%	5%	5%	4%	5%
British not Scottish	3%	4%	4%	4%	3%	4%	5%	5%	6%	4%	4%	5%	6%	6%	6%

===== Forced choice =====
Respondents were asked to select the "National identity that best describes the way respondent thinks of themselves?"

Year	1979	1992	1999	2000	2001	2002	2003	2004	2005	2006	2007	2009	2010	2011	2012	2013	2014
Scottish	57%	72%	77%	80%	77%	75%	72%	75%	77%	78%	72%	73%	73%	75%	69%	66%	65%
British	39%	25%	17%	13%	16%	18%	20%	19%	14%	14%	19%	15%	19%	15%	20%	24%	23%

===== Trends =====
British national identity entered a sharp decline in Scotland from 1979 until the advent of devolution in 1999, with the proportion of respondents in Scotland identifying their national identity as British falling from 39% in 1979 to just 17% in 1999, hitting an all-time-low of 13% in 2000. Since then, there has been a gradual increase in British national identity and a decline in Scottish national identity, with British national identity hitting a twenty-year high in Scotland in 2013 at 24% and Scottish national identity hitting a 35-year low the following year at 65%. Polling conducted since 2014 has indicated that British national identity has risen to between 31 and 36% in Scotland and that Scottish national identity has fallen to between 58 and 62%.

== Recent election results ==
=== 2019 United Kingdom general election ===
In the 2019 United Kingdom general election, the pro-independence Scottish National Party won 45% of the vote share in Scotland (an increase of 8.1% from the previous election) and 48 of the 59 seats contested in Scotland (a net increase of 13). Notable casualties for unionist parties included Jo Swinson, the leader of the Liberal Democrats, who lost her seat in the East Dunbartonshire constituency to the SNP and this resulted in her resigning the party leadership. The Conservatives won six seats (down seven from the previous election), Liberal Democrats four and Labour one (Edinburgh South).

=== 2016 Scottish Parliament election ===
The SNP won 63 seats of 129 available in the 2016 Scottish Parliament election. This meant that they continued in government, but no longer had an overall majority (which they had won in 2011). As the pro-independence Scottish Greens won six seats, there was still a majority of members in favour of Scottish independence. The Scottish Conservatives won 31 seats, overtaking Scottish Labour as the main opposition party in the devolved Parliament. Labour won 24 seats and finished in third place, and the Scottish Liberal Democrats won 5 seats.

== Organisations who support the Union ==
=== Political parties ===
- All for Unity
- Abolish the Scottish Parliament
- Britain First
- British National Party
- Democratic Unionist Party
- Co-operative Party
- Liberal Democrats
- Liberal Party
- Progressive Unionist Party
- Reform UK
- Conservative and Unionist Party
- Labour Party
- Scottish Unionist Party
- Social Democratic Party
- Traditional Unionist Voice
- UK Independence Party
- Ulster Unionist Party

Of the above parties, the three largest and most significant political parties that support the Union are the Labour Party, the Liberal Democrats and the Conservative and Unionist Party, all of which organise and stand in elections across Great Britain and hold representation in both the Scottish and UK Parliaments. These three parties have philosophical differences about what Scotland's status should be, particularly in their support of devolution (historically Home Rule) or federalism.

=== Other groups ===
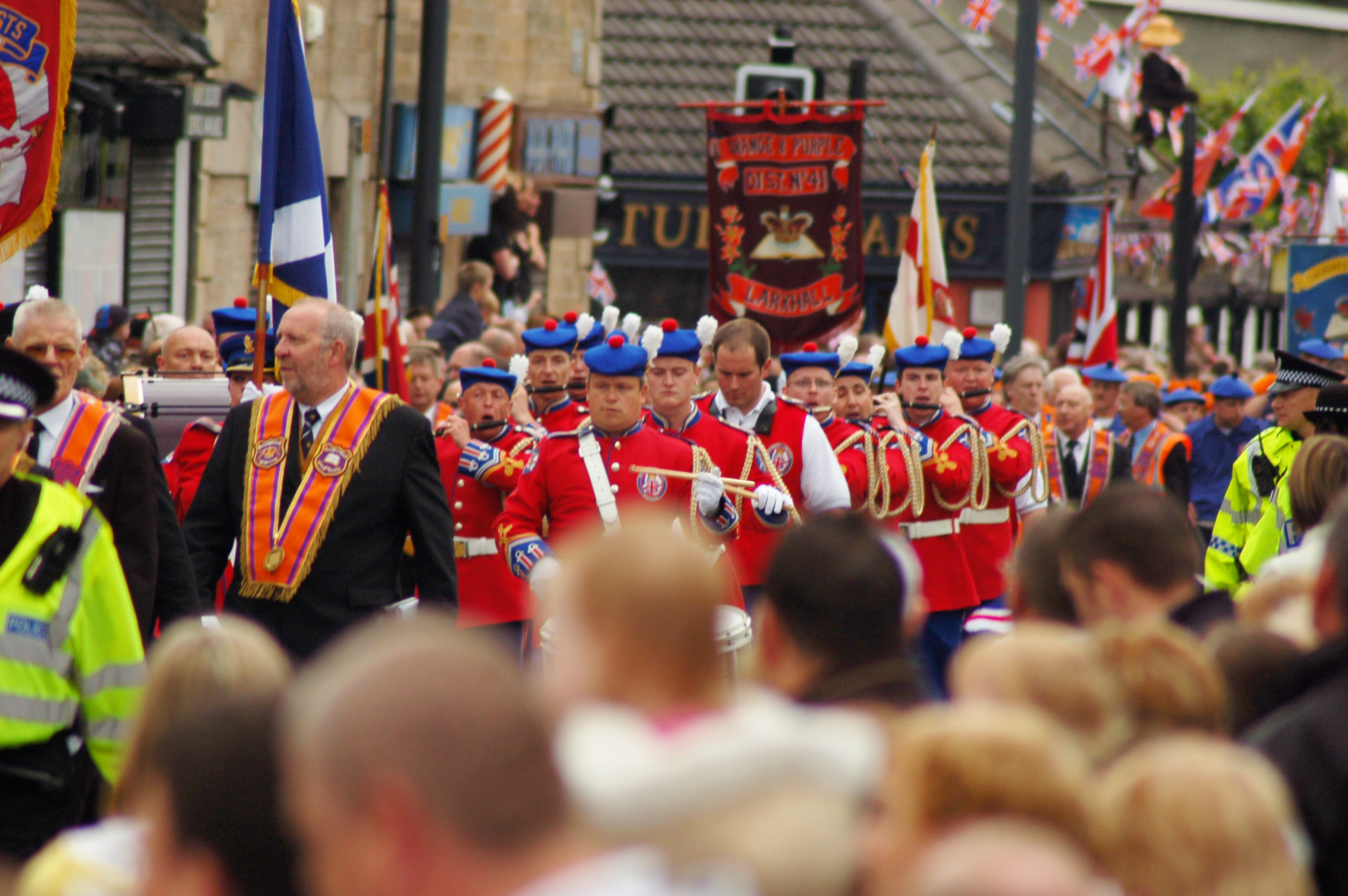
Scottish Orangemen marching in Larkhall

The Grand Orange Lodge of Scotland also supports the continuation of the Union. In March 2007, the Lodge organised a march of 12,000 of its members through Edinburgh's Royal Mile to celebrate the 300th anniversary of the Union. The high turnout was believed to be in part due to opposition to Scottish independence. The Orange Order used the opportunity to speak out against the possibility of nationalists increasing their share of the vote in the 2007 Scottish Parliament election. In the run up to the 2014 Scottish independence referendum, the Orange Order held a Unionist march and rally in Edinburgh which involved 15,000 Orangemen, loyalist bands and unionists from across Scotland and the UK.

During the 2014 referendum campaign, a pro-Union rally by the "Let's Stay Together Campaign" was held in London's Trafalgar Square, where 5,000 people gathered to urge Scotland to vote "No" to independence. Similar events were held in other cities across the rest of the United Kingdom, including in Manchester, Belfast and Cardiff.

=== Ties to Unionism in Northern Ireland ===
There is some degree of social and political co-operation between some Scottish unionists and Northern Irish unionists, due to their similar aims of maintaining the unity with the United Kingdom. For example, the Orange Order parades in Orange walks in Scotland and Northern Ireland. This is largely concentrated in the Central Belt and west of Scotland. A unionist rally was held in Belfast in response to the referendum on Scottish independence. Northern Irish unionists gathered to urge Scottish voters to remain within the United Kingdom.

== See also ==
- Scotland in Union
- Unionism in England
- Unionism in Wales
