= List of Reform UK politicians =

This is a list of Reform UK politicians. Most politicians have defected from other parties and some have left Reform UK since joining. All eight of Reform UK's MPs have been Conservative Party members at some point.

== Former Members of the House of Lords ==
- Malcolm Offord, former Conservative peer

== Former Members of Parliament ==
- Lucy Allan, former Conservative MP
- Alan Amos, former Conservative MP
- Sarah Atherton, former Conservative MP
- Jake Berry, former Conservative MP
- Ben Bradley, former Conservative MP
- Julian Brazier, former Conservative MP
- Michael Brown, former Conservative MP
- Aidan Burley, former Conservative MP
- Chris Butler, former Conservative MP
- Douglas Carswell, former UK Independence Party and Conservative MP
- Maria Caulfield, former Conservative MP
- Simon Danczuk, former Labour MP
- Nadine Dorries, former Conservative MP
- Chris Green, former Conservative MP
- Jonathan Gullis, former Conservative MP
- Darren Henry, former Conservative MP
- Adam Holloway, former Conservative MP
- Andrea Jenkyns, former Conservative MP
- David Jones, former Conservative MP
- Marco Longhi, former Conservative MP
- Damien Moore, former Conservative MP
- Anne Marie Morris, former Conservative MP
- Lia Nici, former Conservative MP
- Lembit Öpik, former Liberal Democrat MP
- Henry Smith, former Conservative MP
- Jane Stevenson, former Conservative MP
- Mark Reckless, former UK Independence Party and Conservative MP
- Ross Thomson, former Conservative MP and MSP
- Ann Widdecombe, former Conservative MP
- Nadhim Zahawi, former Conservative MP

== Members of the Scottish Parliament ==
- Graham Simpson
- Senga Beresford
- Amanda Bland
- Thomas Kerr
- David Kirkwood
- Jamie Langan
- Amanda Lindsay
- Julie MacDougall
- Duncan Massey
- Helen McDade
- Malcolm Offord
- Angela Ross
- Kim Schmulian
- Mark Simpson
- David Smith
- Max Bannerman
- Vic Currie

== Former Members of the Scottish Parliament ==
- Michelle Ballantyne
- Brian Monteith
- Ross Thomson

== Members of the Senedd ==
- Laura Anne Jones
- James Evans
- Benjamin McKenna
- Steve Bayliss
- Helen Jenner
- John Clark
- Llyr Powell
- Catherine Cullen
- Joshua Kim
- Iain McIntosh
- David Mills
- Cai Parry-Jones
- Joe Martin
- Dan Thomas
- Art Wright
- Claire Archibald
- Paul Marr
- Adrian Mason
- Louise Emery
- Thomas Montgomery
- Christiana Emsley
- Nigel Williams
- Andrew Griffin
- Claire Johnson-Wood
- Francesca O'Brien
- Steven Rodaway
- Sarah Cooper-Lesadd
- Gareth Thomas
- Jason O'Connell
- David Hughes
- Stephen Senior
- Gareth Beer
- Carmelo Colasanto
- Sarah Edwards

== Former Members of the Senedd ==
- Caroline Jones
- Mandy Jones
- Mark Reckless
- David Rowlands

== Former Members of the European Parliament ==
- David Campbell Bannerman

== Members of the London Assembly ==
- Alex Wilson
- Keith Prince

== Mayors ==
- Luke Campbell
- Andrea Jenkyns

== Former Mayors ==
- Sir Robin Wales, former Labour Mayor of Newham

== Police and crime commissioners ==
- Rupert Matthews
- Colin Sutton

== Former Police and crime commissioners ==
- Caroline Henry

== Prospective parliamentary candidates ==
Notable prospective parliamentary candidates who stood in the 2024 United Kingdom general election include:

Name
Jay Aston
David Bull
David Burgess-Joyce
Chris Butler
June Mummery
Martin Daubney
Peter Dawe
Michelle Dewberry
Mitch Feierstein
Mike Greene
Colin Lambert
Chidi Ngwaba
James Wells

== Notable councillors ==
Name	Former Party	Councillor	Ref.
Laila Cunningham	Conservative	Westminster City Council	
George Finch	Conservative	Warwickshire County Council	
Darren Grimes	Conservative	Durham County Council	
Linden Kemkaran	Conservative	Kent County Council	
Thomas Kerr	Scottish Conservatives	Glasgow City Council	

== Former Reform UK politicians ==
- Catherine Blaiklock (until 2019).
- Nick Buckley (until 2025)
- Howard Cox (until 2025)
- Nathan Gill (until 2021)
- Ben Habib (until 2024)
- Rupert Lowe (until 2025)
- James McMurdock (until 2025)

== See also ==
- List of Conservative Party defections to Reform UK
