= Jenner shadow cabinet =

Shadow cabinet of Wales (September 2026 – present)

Helen Jenner Shadow Cabinet
- Shadow Cabinet of Wales
- September 2026 – present
- Jenner with members of Reform UK Wales in September 2026
- Date formed: 21 September 2026

People and organisations
- Leader of the Opposition: Helen Jenner
- Deputy Leader of the Opposition: Laura Anne Jones
- Member party: Reform UK
- Status in legislature: Official Opposition; 2026–

History
- Incoming formation: 2026 Reform UK Wales leadership election
- Legislature term: 7th Senedd
- Predecessor: Thomas shadow cabinet

Helen Jenner became Leader of the Opposition in Wales following the resignation of Dan Thomas as Leader of Reform UK Wales on 15 September 2026; she was elected as the new permanent leader on 21 September. The full cabinet was announced on 23 September.

== Members ==
Portfolio	Name	Constituency	Term
Leader of the Opposition	Helen Jenner MS	Bangor Conwy Môn	September 2026 – present
Shadow Cabinet Minister for the Welsh Language	Helen Jenner MS	Bangor Conwy Môn	May 2026 – present
Deputy Leader of the Opposition	Laura Anne Jones MS	Sir Fynwy Torfaen	September 2026 – present
Shadow Cabinet Minister for Food, Farming and Agriculture	Laura Anne Jones MS	Sir Fynwy Torfaen	May 2026 – present
Shadow Cabinet Minister for Health and Prevention	Benjamin Hodge Mckenna MS	Afan Ogwr Rhondda	September 2026 – present
Shadow Cabinet Minister for Education	Stephen Senior MS	Sir Fynwy Torfaen	September 2026 – present
Shadow Cabinet Minister for Local Government, Housing and Planning	Francesca O'Brien MS	Gŵyr Abertawe	May 2026 – present
Shadow Cabinet Minister for Economy and Transport	Jason O'Connell MS	Pontypridd Cynon Merthyr	May 2026 – present
Shadow Cabinet Minister for Finance	Cai Parry-Jones MS	Caerdydd Ffynnon Taf	May 2026 – present
Shadow Cabinet Minister for Children and Young People	Catherine Cullen MS	Blaenau Gwent Caerffili Rhymni	September 2026 – present
Shadow Cabinet Minister for Skills	Tom Montgomery MS	Clwyd	September 2026 – present
Shadow Cabinet Minister for Fairness, Families and Communities	Cristiana Emsley MS	Fflint Wrecsam	May 2026 – present
Shadow Counsel General; Shadow Minister for the Constitution	Adrian Mason MS	Clwyd	May 2026 – present
Shadow Minister for Disabilities, Mental Health and Armed Forces Communities	Gaz Thomas MS	Pen-y-bont Bro Morgannwg	May 2026 – present
Shadow Cabinet Minister for Government Efficiency	Iain McIntosh MS	Brycheiniog Tawe Nedd	September 2026 – present
Shadow Minister for Social Care	Claire Archibald MS	Ceredigion Penfro	May 2026 – present
Chief Whip and Business Manager	Llŷr Powell MS	Blaenau Gwent Caerffili Rhymni	May 2026 – present
Shadow Minister for Culture, Tourism, Sport and Hospitality	Louise Emery MS	Clwyd	May 2026 – present
Deputy Whip	Louise Emery MS	Clwyd	September 2026 – present
Deputy Whip	Paul Marr MS	Ceredigion Penfro	September 2026 – present
Shadow Minister without Portfolio	Joe Martin MS	Caerdydd Penarth	September 2026 – present
