= Sarah Cooper-Lesadd =

Welsh politician (born 1994 or 1995)

Sarah Cooper-Lesadd MS
- Official portrait, 2026

Shadow Cabinet Minister for Children, Young People and Skills
- In office 19 May 2026 – 15 September 2026
- Leader: Dan Thomas
- Preceded by: Natasha Asghar (Note: as Shadow Cabinet Secretary for Children, Young People and Education)
- Succeeded by: Catherine Cullen

Member of the Senedd
- Incumbent
- Assumed office 8 May 2026
- Constituency: Pen-y-bont Bro Morgannwg

Personal details
- Born: 1994 or 1995 (age 31–32) Newport, Wales
- Party: Plaid Cymru (since 2026)
- Other political affiliations: Reform UK (January to September 2026); Conservative (until 2025)
- Education: University of Cambridge

Sarah Cooper-Lesadd (born 1994 or 1995) is a Welsh politician who has served as a member of the Senedd (MS) for Pen-y-bont Bro Morgannwg since 2026. A member of Plaid Cymru, she was elected as a Reform UK candidate but later defected. She served as Shadow Minister for Children, Young People and Skills from May to September 2026.

Born in Newport and raised in and out of care, Cooper-Lesadd studied sociology and political science at the University of Cambridge. She worked in financial public relations before becoming a civil servant for the Civil Service, UK Parliament and Church of England. She subsequently worked as a private secretary to life peers and as an assistant to Conservative Member of Parliament Vicky Ford.

She unsuccessfully contested as the Conservative candidate for Coventry East in the 2024 general election. She left the Conservative Party in 2025 and later joined Reform UK. She was elected as an MS in the 2026 Senedd election and was appointed into the Thomas shadow cabinet, and selected as the chair of the Senedd Legislation Committee. In September 2026, she defected to Plaid Cymru.

== Early life and career ==
Cooper-Lesadd was born in Newport in 1994 or 1995 and raised in residential care throughout her childhood. Her birth mother died when she was three weeks old following postpartum psychosis, and her birth father put her up for adoption when she was six months old. She temporarily lived with her birth father in Cwmbran and Pontypool, before being adopted at the age of seven and moving to London. She was unable to count to ten by the time she had begun school at the same age. She described realizing the importance of politics as a child after finalising her adoption in court.

At the age of 18, Cooper-Lesadd began attending the University of Cambridge, where she studied sociology and political science. She was the communications and publicity officer for the Cambridge University Conservative Association. In 2016, she spoke in the student magazine Varsity about sexism within the association. During her second year at Cambridge, she contracted infectious mononucleosis, which affected her for around six months while continuing her studies.

Cooper-Lesadd began her career in financial public relations before joining the UK Government Civil Service, where she worked for five and a half years. During her time in the Civil Service, she worked on housing policy at the Ministry of Housing, Communities and Local Government, and later served as an assistant private secretary to Conservative life peer Baron Agnew and then as a private secretary to Baron Grimstone. Cooper-Lesadd subsequently worked in the UK Parliament and later the Church of England. From 2022 to 2026, she worked in Essex as an assistant to Vicky Ford, Conservative Member of Parliament for Chelmsford. She also worked as an editor for The Freedom Association, resigning in September 2026.

== Political career ==
In the 2024 general election, Cooper-Lesadd stood as the Conservative candidate for Coventry East. She came third, receiving 6,240 votes (16.2%), defeated by Labour candidate Mary Creagh.

In 2025, Cooper-Lesadd left the Conservative Party. After leaving she had been interviewed by Bloomberg in October, at a Conservative Women's Organisation Margaret Thatcher tribute event at the Conservative Party Conference. She noted in the interview the growth of Reform UK from former Conservatives and argued that the party should focus on developing solutions for contemporary issues. In January 2026, she joined Reform UK.

=== Member of the Senedd (2026–present) ===
Cooper-Lesadd speaking in the Siambr in September 2026

In the 2026 Senedd election, Cooper-Lesadd was elected as a Member of the Senedd (MS) for the six-member Pen-y-bont Bro Morgannwg constituency, with Reform UK receiving 24,602 votes (30.1%). She was the party's lead candidate for the constituency, and was elected alongside Gaz Thomas. Cooper-Lesadd was formerly a candidate for Afan Ogwr Rhondda, placed second on the party candidates list for the constituency. However, she was moved to Pen-y-bont Bro Morgannwg to replace former candidate Corey Edwards, who left the party following the circulation of an image of him performing a Nazi salute.

On 19 May, Cooper-Lesadd was appointed Shadow Cabinet Minister for Children, Young People and Skills in the Thomas shadow cabinet, after Reform UK became the Official Opposition. In June 2026, she was selected as the chair of the Senedd Legislation Committee.

During a debate in the Senedd on 1 July 2026, Cooper-Lesadd spoke of her experiences growing up in care and called for trauma-informed training and recognition that the effects of childhood trauma can continue beyond the age of 18.

On 8 July 2026, Cooper-Lesadd brought a non-binding motion before the Senedd calling for legislation to strengthen protections for children in care in Wales. She proposed a bill extending corporate parenting responsibilities from local authorities to other public bodies, including health boards. The motion was passed without a vote. Delyth Jewell, Deputy Minister for Social Care, Mental Health and Women's Health, said in response to the debate that the government was willing to consider new legislation and did not rule out statutory options.

==== Defection to Plaid Cymru ====
On 15 September 2026, Cooper-Lesadd defected from Reform UK to Plaid Cymru, becoming the 44th Plaid MS and leaving Reform UK with 33 MS. Her defection came on the same day as the resignation of Dan Thomas as Leader of Reform UK Wales, which came following his arrest on suspicion of assault and controlling or coercive behaviour at the weekend and subsequent release. At a press conference following the defection, she said that Wales needed more devolution, arguing that the country was "shortchanged in so many different ways" and that "Plaid Cymru is the party that best embodies that for me." First Minister of Wales and Leader of Plaid Cymru Rhun ap Iorwerth posted on X that the party's objective was to "win support for our vision for Wales", writing that Cooper-Lesadd had been "inspired by that positive vision". He added that she shared the party's values, including rejection of "the hateful rhetoric of the right."

Cooper-Lesadd told the BBC that "Reform has no interest in the work I came here to do", arguing that the party was "far more interested in division, opposition and headlines than in finding solutions". She added that "the party centrally has no interest in Wales" and claimed that its Senedd group was "a staging post in the effort to get Nigel Farage into Downing Street", which she said was "glaringly obvious" at the party's conference earlier that week. Cooper-Lesadd also said she had supported the government supplementary budget, and opposed Reform's decision to table a debate on the Nation of Sanctuary, rejecting the use of minorities as "political targets" and what she referred to as scapegoating. Cooper-Lesadd also criticised Reform for not disciplining Reform MS Joe Martin, who was accused of racism following a speech in June and argued that "the party haven't reflected and learned ... and they won't learn."

Reform UK criticised the defection. Party leader Nigel Farage and deputy leader Richard Tice both criticised Cooper-Lesadd, with Tice saying that she had misled the party about her political beliefs. Reform MS and Chief Whip Llŷr Powell questioned whether she fully understood the party's core values, while the party's director of external affairs, Matthew MacKinnon, called for her resignation. A Reform spokesperson said that the party had planned to expel Cooper-Lesadd for her support of Welsh independence.

== Electoral history ==
Election	Seat	Party	Votes	Percentage (%)	Result	Source
General, 2024	Coventry East	Conservative Party	6,240	16.9	Not elected	
Senedd, 2026	Pen-y-bont Bro Morgannwg	Reform UK Wales	24,602	30.1	Elected	

== Political positions ==
Cooper-Lesadd supports Welsh independence and believes a referendum on it should be held. She also supports Welsh devolution, at a press conference following her defection to Plaid, she argued that the country was "shortchanged in so many different ways" and needed greater devolution. She has said that she had voted "Remain" in the 2016 European Union membership referendum and supports a re-accession of the United Kingdom to the European Union. As a Reform UK member, Cooper-Lesadd had supported the government supplementary budget, and opposed Reform's decision to table a debate on the Nation of Sanctuary.

== Personal life ==
She lives in Treforest, Pontypridd. During the COVID-19 lockdown, Cooper-Lesadd lived in Birmingham and Lichfield.

== See also ==
- 7th Senedd
- List of Plaid Cymru MSs
- List of Reform UK politicians
- List of female members of the Senedd

== Notes ==
Political offices
Preceded by Natasha Asghar	Shadow Cabinet Minister for Children, Young People and Skills; 2026	Succeeded by TBD
