= Thomas shadow cabinet =

Shadow cabinet of Wales (May 2026 – September 2026)

Dan Thomas Shadow Cabinet
- Shadow Cabinet of Wales
- May 2026 – September 2026
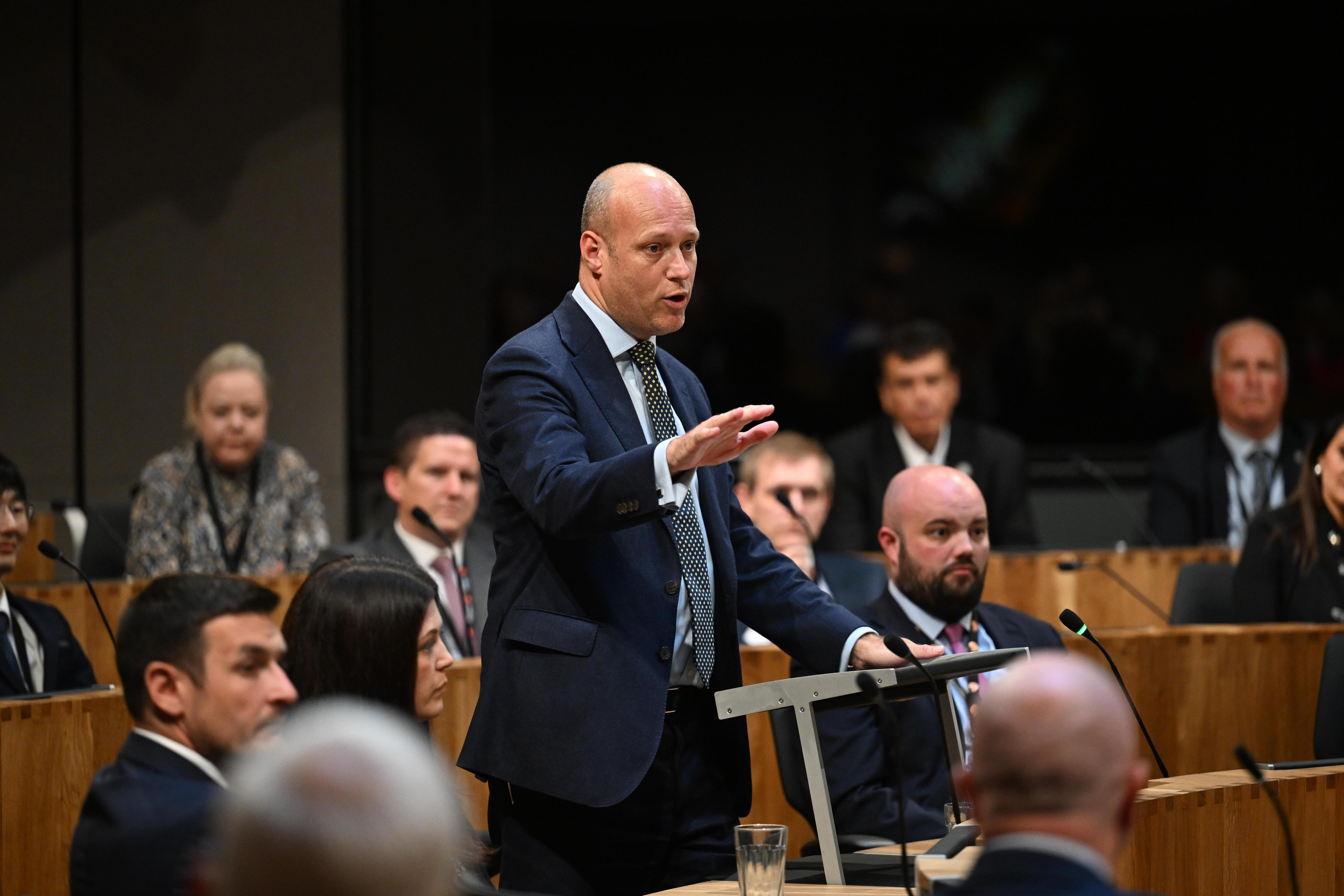
- Thomas with members of Reform UK Wales in May 2026
- Date formed: 19 May 2026
- Date dissolved: 21 September 2026

People and organisations
- Leader of the Opposition: Dan Thomas; Helen Jenner (Acting)
- Deputy Leader of the Opposition: Helen Jenner
- Member party: Reform UK
- Status in legislature: Official Opposition; 2026

History
- Incoming formation: 2026 Senedd election
- Outgoing formation: 2026 Reform UK Wales leadership election
- Legislature term: 7th Senedd
- Predecessor: Millar shadow cabinet
- Successor: Jenner shadow cabinet

Dan Thomas became Leader of the Opposition in Wales following the 2026 Senedd election and the election of Rhun ap Iorwerth as First Minister of Wales. He announced his Shadow Cabinet on 19 May 2026. Dan Thomas resigned as Leader of the Opposition on 15 September 2026 following his arrest on suspicion of assault.

Following Dan Thomas's resignation as Leader of Reform UK Wales in September 2026, the party's shadow cabinet was automatically dissolved. The new leader Helen Jenner determined the composition of the subsequent shadow cabinet.

On 15 September 2026 Sarah Cooper-Lesadd, the Shadow Cabinet Minister for Children, Young People and Skills, defected from Reform UK to Plaid Cymru.

== Members ==
| Portfolio | Name | Constituency | Term |
|---|---|---|---|
| Leader of the Opposition | Dan Thomas MS | Casnewydd Islwyn | May – September 2026 |
| Deputy Leader of the Opposition; Shadow Cabinet Minister for Education and the Welsh Language | Helen Jenner MS | Bangor Conwy Môn | May 2026 – September 2026 |
| Shadow Cabinet Minister for Health, Prevention and Sport | James Evans MS | Brycheiniog Tawe Nedd | May 2026 – |
| Shadow Cabinet Minister for Local Government, Housing and Planning | Francesca O'Brien MS | Gŵyr Abertawe | May 2026 – |
| Shadow Cabinet Minister for Economy and Transport | Jason O'Connell MS | Pontypridd Cynon Merthyr | May 2026 – |
| Shadow Cabinet Minister for Food, Farming and Rural Affairs | Laura Anne Jones MS | Sir Fynwy Torfaen | May 2026 – |
| Shadow Cabinet Minister for Finance and Government Efficiency | Cai Parry-Jones MS | Caerdydd Ffynnon Taf | May 2026 – |
| Shadow Cabinet Minister for Children, Young People and Skills | Sarah Cooper-Lesadd MS | Pen-y-bont Bro Morgannwg | May – September 2026 |
| Shadow Cabinet Minister for Fairness, Families and Communities | Cristiana Emsley MS | Fflint Wrecsam | May 2026 – |
| Shadow Counsel General; Shadow Minister for the Constitution | Adrian Mason MS | Clwyd | May 2026 – |
| Shadow Minister for Culture, Tourism and Hospitality | Louise Emery MS | Clwyd | May 2026 – |
| Shadow Minister for Disabilities, Mental Health and Veterans | Gaz Thomas MS | Pen-y-bont Bro Morgannwg | May 2026 – |
| Shadow Minister for Social Care | Claire Archibald MS | Ceredigion Penfro | May 2026 – |
| Chief Whip and Business Manager | Llŷr Powell MS | Blaenau Gwent Caerffili Rhymni | May 2026 – |
