= Tom Montgomery =

Welsh politician

Tom Montgomery MS
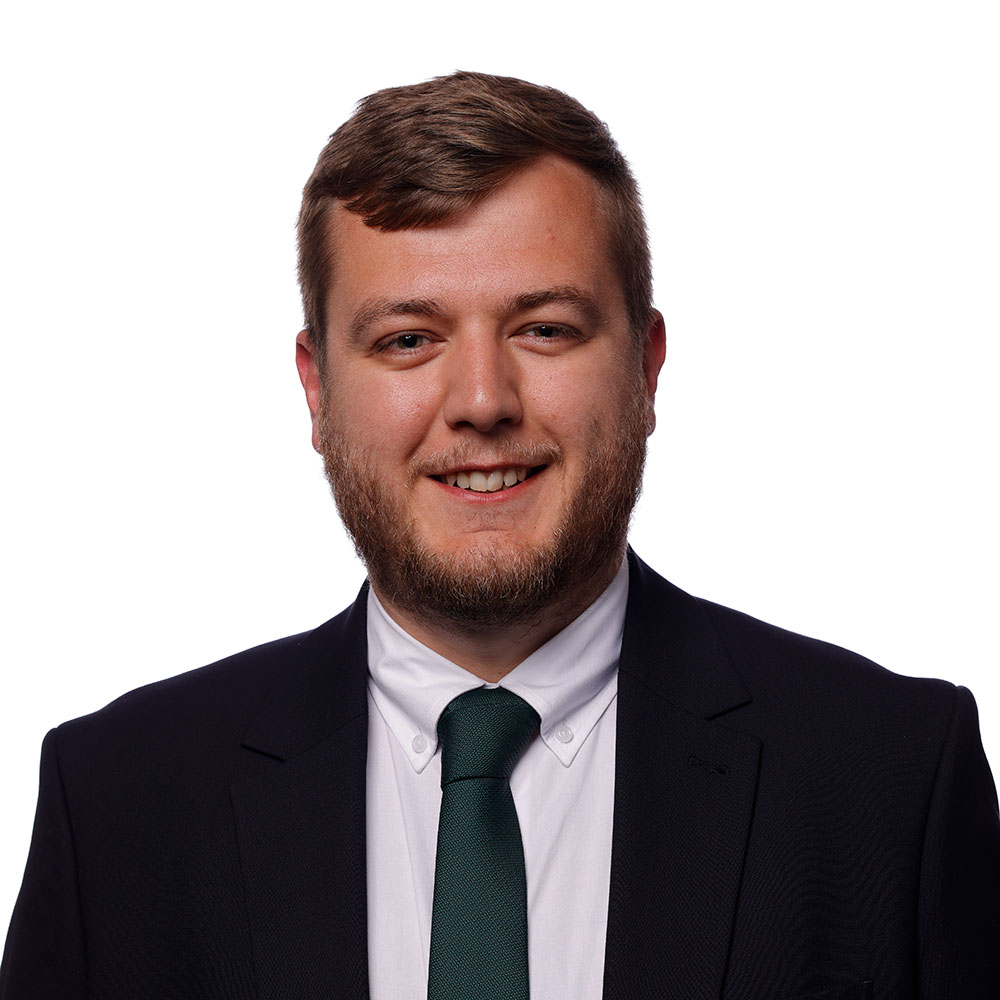
- Official portrait, 2026

Shadow Cabinet Minister for Skills
- Incumbent
- Assumed office 23 September 2026
- Leader: Helen Jenner
- Preceded by: Sarah Cooper-Lesadd

Member of the Senedd
- Incumbent
- Assumed office 8 May 2026
- Preceded by: Constituency established
- Constituency: Clwyd

Personal details
- Born: Thomas Brian Montgomery
- Party: Reform UK
- Other political affiliations: Conservative (before 2022)

Thomas Brian Montgomery is a Welsh politician serving as a Member of the Senedd for Clwyd since 2026, representing Reform UK.

Montgomery was previously a member of the Welsh Conservatives, having been elected with the Tories in the 2022 Conwy County Borough Council election.
