= Paul Marr =

Welsh politician

Paul Marr MS
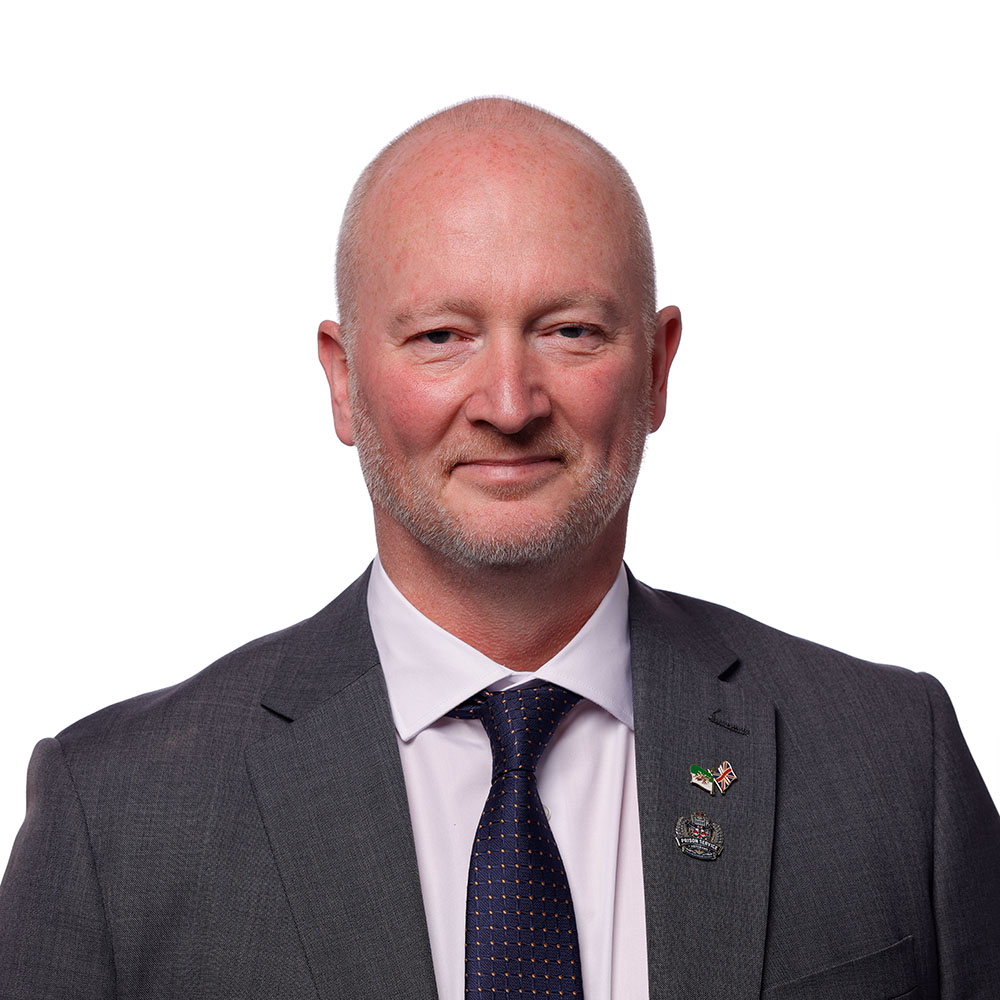
- Official portrait, 2026

Reform UK Wales Deputy Whip
- Incumbent
- Assumed office 23 September 2026
- Leader: Helen Jenner

Member of the Senedd for Ceredigion Penfro
- Incumbent
- Assumed office 8 May 2026
- Preceded by: Constituency established

Personal details
- Party: Reform UK

Paul Marr is a Welsh politician serving as a Member of the Senedd (MS) for Ceredigion Penfro since the 2026 election, representing Reform UK. Marr is a former prison officer. Marr was serving at HMP Usk when he was bitten by an inmate in October 2008, receiving some news coverage.
