= 2026 Reform UK Wales leadership election =

- 21 September 2026

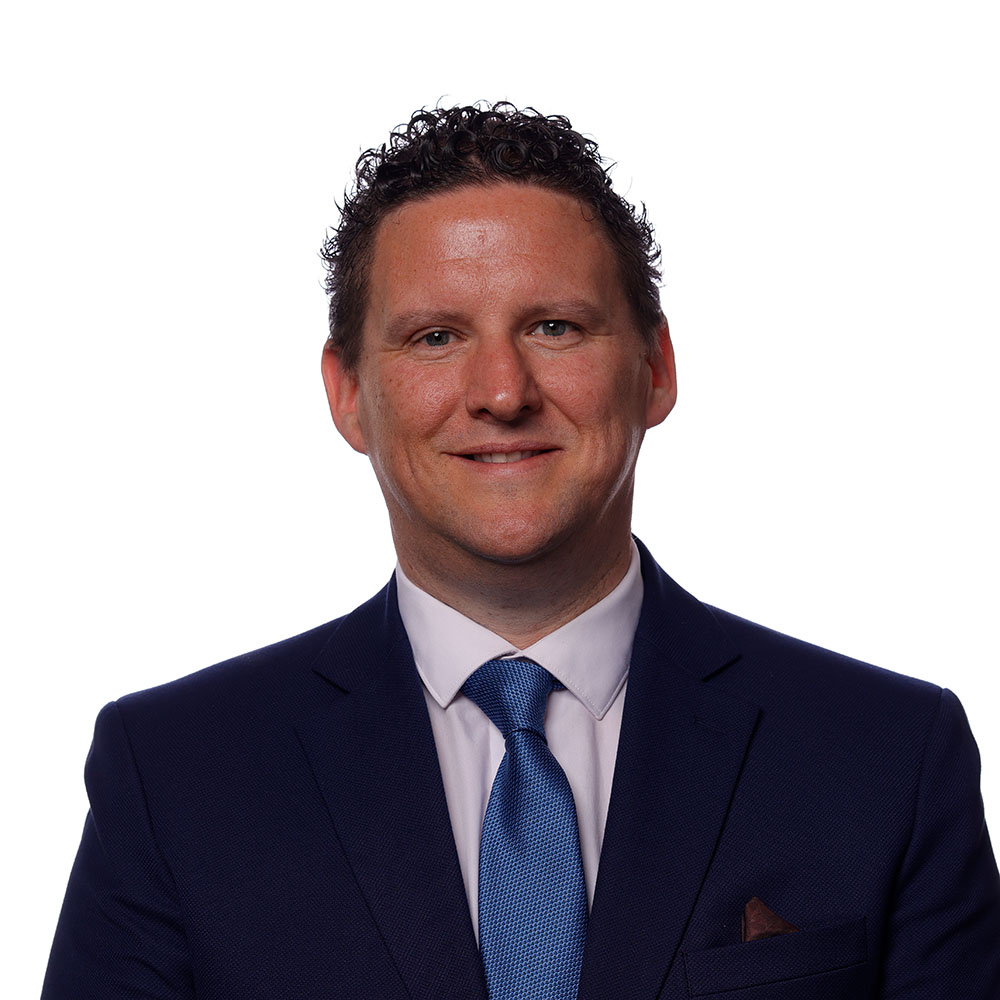
Candidate	Helen Jenner	Jason O'Connell
MSs' ballot	17 (51.5%)	15 (45.5%)
Leader before election
Helen Jenner (acting)
Dan Thomas
Elected Leader
Helen Jenner

The 2026 Reform UK Wales leadership election was initiated when Dan Thomas, the Leader of Reform UK Wales and Leader of the Opposition in the Senedd, resigned on 15 September 2026. Helen Jenner was announced as the winner on 21 September.

== Background ==
On 15 September 2026, the leader of Reform UK Wales, Dan Thomas resigned as Leader after being arrested on suspicion of assault and controlling or coercive behaviour, Thomas has disputed the charges and stated he has "done nothing wrong", and that he was "standing down [...] due to personal reasons".

Following Dan Thomas' resignation Helen Jenner, the deputy leader became acting leader, and the following day a meeting of Reform UK Senedd Members was held. The Chief Whip Llŷr Powell said the party would hold an internal vote of Senedd Members to decide the next leader, and said it should be concluded by the end of September. Powell did not rule himself out of standing, and Jenner was also expected to stand. James Evans, Cai Parry-Jones, and Jason O'Connell all ruled themselves out of standing, but Evans did say he had the support of the majority of members.

== Results ==
Despite not initially being expected to stand, O'Connell stood against Jenner in the election. Jenner was elected, with Jenner getting the support of 17 Reform Members of the Senedd and O'Connell getting the support of 15.

== Aftermath ==
Laura Anne Jones was elected as the new deputy leader replacing Jenner on 22 September 2026.
