= Leader of Reform UK Wales =

Leader of Reform Wales
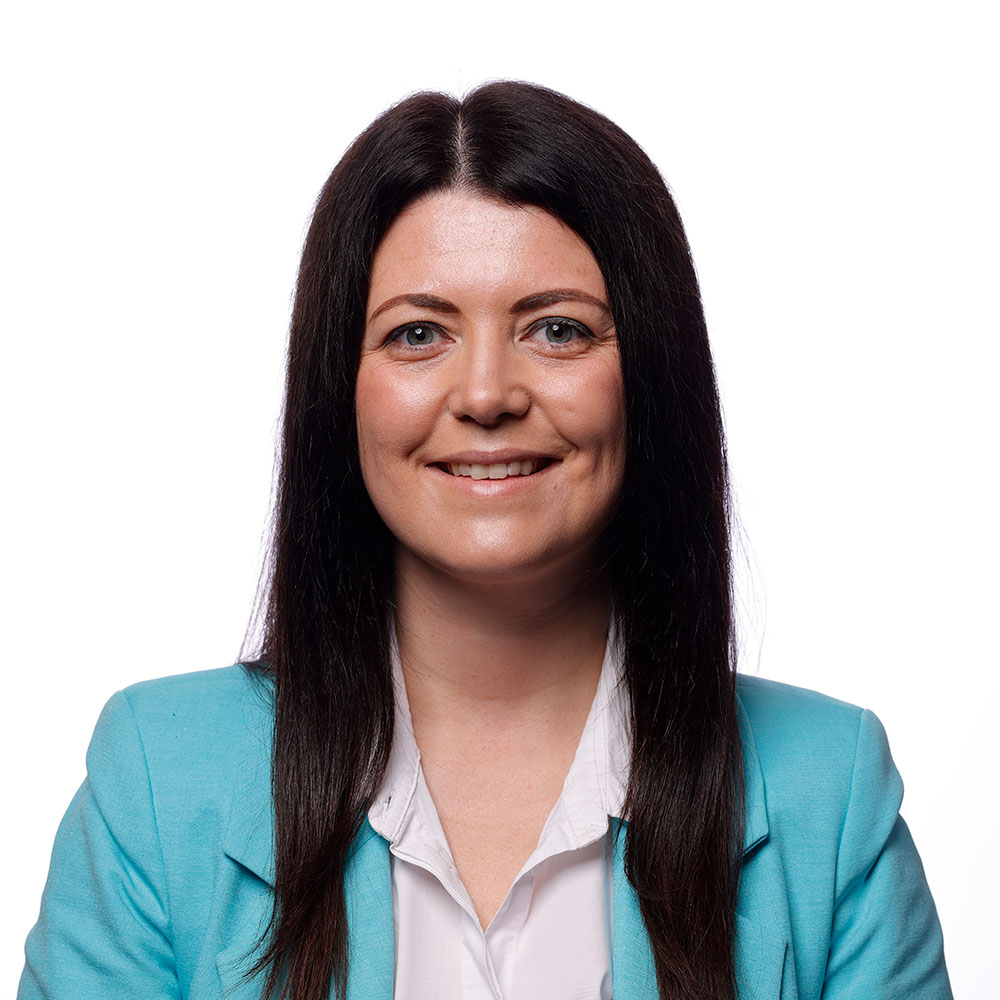
- Incumbent; Helen Jenner since 15 September 2026 (Note: Jenner was the acting Leader of Reform UK Wales between the 15th September and 21st September 2026.)
- Style: Party Leader
- Formation: 15 May 2019 (original); 5 February 2026 (current)
- First holder: Mark Reckless (Note: as Leader of the Brexit Party in Wales); Nathan Gill (Note: as Leader of Reform UK Wales)

The Leader of Reform UK Wales is the most senior position within the wing of Reform UK Wales. The current leader is Helen Jenner since 21 September 2026, following the resignation of Dan Thomas on 15 September 2026. The position has previously been held by Mark Reckless and Nathan Gill.

== History ==
=== Mark Reckless (2019–2020) ===
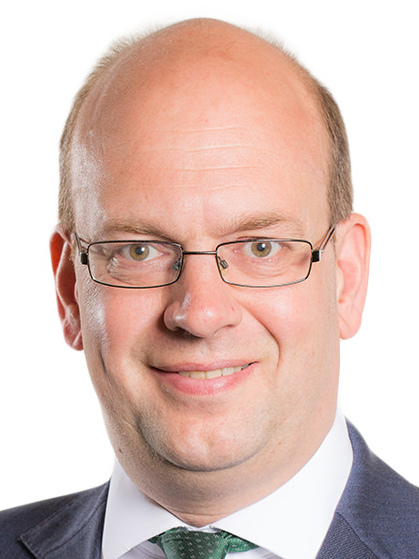
Mark Reckless

From 15 May 2019 to 19 October 2020, when the party was known as the Brexit Party, its Welsh leader was Mark Reckless, a member of the Senedd (MS) for South Wales East. Reckless was initially elected in May 2016 as a member of the UK Independence Party (UKIP). He left UKIP in 2017, and was admitted to the Conservative group in the Welsh Assembly, though not to the Conservative Party itself, however for purposes of Assembly business he was treated as a Conservative member. In 2019, Reckless left the Conservative group to sit as an independent. In May, he joined the Brexit Party and became its first Welsh leader, then leaving the party and joining the Abolish the Welsh Assembly Party. He said since Brexit had been effectively achieved, the work of the Brexit Party was complete. Two weeks later, the Brexit Party was rebranded as Reform UK.

=== Nathan Gill (2021) ===
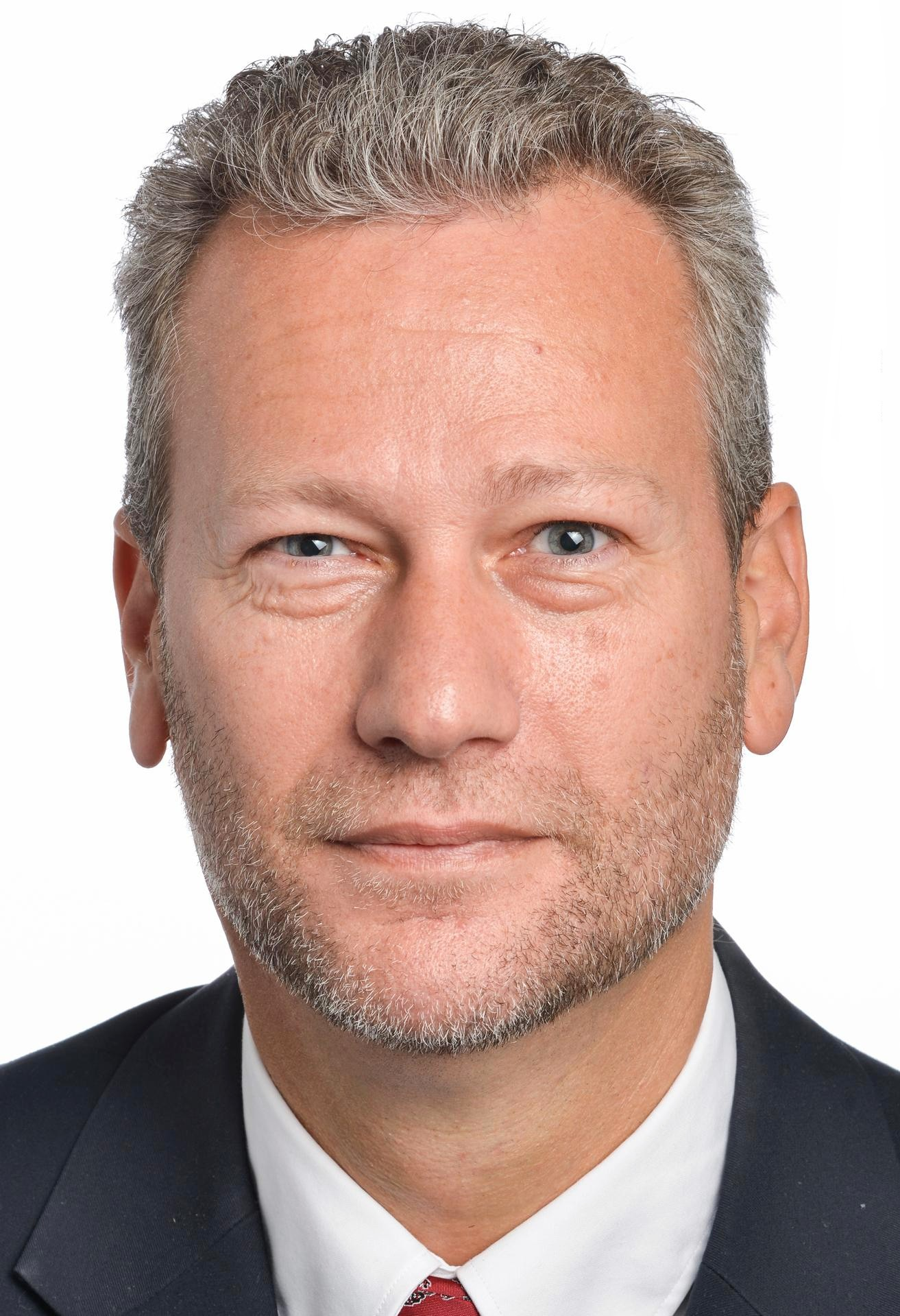
Nathan Gill

From 26 March 2021 to 8 May the office was held by Nathan Gill. Gill was a Member of the European Parliament for Wales between July 2014 until the UK left the EU in January 2021. He was elected as a member of UKIP, before leaving to serve as an independent between 2018 and 2019, and then after joining the party, he finally served as a member of the Brexit Party from 2019, being relected as a MEP in the same year for the party. He was UKIP's Welsh Leader between 2014 and 2016, and was also a member of the Senedd for UKIP representating North Wales between 2016 and 2017. In 2018, Gill subsequently left UKIP, citing much infighting and distractions. He had disagreements with his successor as UKIP's Welsh Leader, Neil Hamilton, and was opposed to the party leader Gerard Batten's links to far-right activist Tommy Robinson. He joined the new Brexit Party in February 2019, and after the party renamed itself Reform UK in January 2021, he became its Welsh leader in March 2021. Gill was a regional list candidate in the 2021 Senedd election for the North Wales electoral region but was not elected. He quit Reform UK shortly afterwards. Gill was sentenced in November 2025 to 10 1/2 years in prison for taking bribes to make pro-Russia statements while a Member of the European Parliament.

=== Dan Thomas (February – September 2026) ===
Dan Thomas

From 2021 until 2026, the leadership of Reform UK Wales remained vacant.

On 5 February 2026, Dan Thomas was appointed as Reform's Welsh Leader. Thomas was born and grew up in Wales, but moved to London when he was 18, where he served as a Conservative Party councillor on Barnet London Borough Council from 2006 to 2025, serving as leader of the council from 2019 to 2022, and as leader of the opposition Conservative group on the council following 2022. He defected to Reform UK in June 2025. He later resigned from the council on 31 December 2025, leaving a vacant seat heading into the 2026 election, before moving to back to Wales with his family.

In his announcement regarding Thomas's appointment as Welsh Leader, Reform UK leader, Nigel Farage, said: "He has voluntarily left London, come back to the Valleys, living in Islwyn, come back to his home, and he's done that because he loves Wales." However, Nation.Cymru reported that a source told it that Thomas had actually moved to Bath, Somerset, England. Following speculation in the media about where Thomas lived, Reform UK said: "Dan lives in Wales. Any claim to the contrary is entirely false. He lives here in Wales, where he is raising his young family". They also confirmed that he owns a property portfolio, which included a property in Bath that is rented out and not his main residence. ITV Wales confirmed they had seen proof that Thomas was added to the electoral roll in the Caerphilly borough area in July 2025. A Reform UK spokesperson said: "Dan is on the electoral roll here in Wales".

On 1 April 2026, Thomas appointed Helen Jenner as Deputy Leader of Reform UK Wales. She has represented Bangor Conwy Môn since the 2026 Senedd election. She previously contested the Ynys Môn Parliamentary constituency at the 2019 general election for Reform UK under its previous name of the Brexit Party, where she came fourth out of four candidates, receiving 6% of the vote.

On 15 September 2026, Thomas resigned as Leader after a false allegation led to him being arrested on suspicion of assault and controlling or coercive behaviour, Thomas has disputed the charges and stated he has "done nothing wrong", and that he was "standing down [...] due to personal reasons". On 17 November 2026, Thomas was vindicated when the police dropped the investigation and said no further action would be taken.

=== Helen Jenner (September 2026 – incumbent) ===
Following Dan Thomas' resignation Helen Jenner, the Deputy Leader and MS for Bangor Conwy Môn, became acting leader, and the following day a meeting of Reform UK Senedd Members was held. The Chief Whip Llŷr Powell said the party would hold an internal vote of Senedd Members to decide the next leader, and said it would be concluded by the end of September. Powell did not rule himself out of standing, and Jenner was expected to stand. James Evans, Cai Parry-Jones, and Jason O'Connell all ruled themselves out of standing, but Evans did say he had the support of the majority of members. Despite ruling himself out publicly, Jenner confirmed O'Connel did stand against her during the internal vote on 21 September, with Jenner winning with 17 against 15 votes and after she was backed by "very senior" Reform UK figures. She was announced as leader by UK leader Nigel Farage on the same day as the internal vote outside the Senedd, with Farage saying the party would "carry on as if nothing has happened”. As Leader of Reform UK Wales, Jenner also serves as the Leader the Opposition in the Senedd.

Laura Anne Jones was elected as the new deputy leader the next day, on 22 September 2026. Jones was previously suspended from the Senedd in November 2025 after she used a racial slur to describe Chinese people in a Whatsapp chat.

== List of Leaders of Reform UK Wales ==
No.	Leader	Portrait	Took office	Left office	Senedd Elections	Tenure	Constituency in Senedd	Reform UK Leader	Ref.	First Minister
1	Mark Reckless (Note: Reckless was known as the Leader of the Brexit Party in Wales for the duration of the time he was in office. The Brexit Party renamed itself Reform UK in January 2021, two months after Reckless resigned from the party to join the Abolish the Welsh Assembly Party.) (born 1970)		15 May 2019	19 October 2020	―	1 year, 157 days	MS for South Wales East	Nigel Farage		Mark Drakeford
Office vacant between 19 October 2020 – 26 March 2021 (158 days)										Mark Drakeford
2	Nathan Gill (born 1973)		26 March 2021	8 May 2021	2021 (Didn't win a seat)	43 days	No seat in Senedd (Note: Gill previously sat in the Senedd for UKIP between 2016 and 2017, representing North Wales, but didn't have a seat in the Senedd for the duration of his time in office as Leader of Reform Wales, having lost his recontest of North Wales for Reform in the 2021 Senedd election.)	Richard Tice		Mark Drakeford
Office vacant between 8 May 2021 – 5 February 2026 (4 years, 273 days)
3	Dan Thomas (born c.1981)		5 February 2026	15 September 2026	2026	136 days	MS for Casnewydd Islwyn	Nigel Farage		Rhun ap Iorwerth
—	Helen Jenner (born 1988 or 1989)		15 September 2026	21 September 2026	―	6 days	MS for Bangor Conwy Môn	Nigel Farage		Rhun ap Iorwerth
4	Helen Jenner (born 1988 or 1989)		21 September 2026	Incumbent	―	58 days (Note: 64 days total starting with her time in office as acting Leader of Reform UK Wales.)	MS for Bangor Conwy Môn	Nigel Farage		Rhun ap Iorwerth

== List of Deputy Leaders of Reform UK Wales ==
No.	Deputy Leader	Portrait	Took office	Left office	Senedd Elections	Tenure	Constituency in Senedd	Reform UK Wales Leader	Reform UK Leader	Ref.	First Minister
1	Helen Jenner		1 April 2026	21 September 2026	2026	174 days	MS for Bangor Conwy Môn	Dan Thomas (5 February–15 September 2026)	Nigel Farage		Rhun ap Iorwerth
1	Helen Jenner		1 April 2026	21 September 2026	2026	174 days	MS for Bangor Conwy Môn	Herself (15–22 September 2026)	Nigel Farage		Rhun ap Iorwerth
2	Laura Anne Jones		22 September 2026	Incumbent	―	57 days	MS for Sir Fynwy Torfaen	Helen Jenner	Nigel Farage		Rhun ap Iorwerth

== Notes ==
1. Jenner was the acting Leader of Reform UK Wales between the 15th September and 21st September 2026.
2. as Leader of the Brexit Party in Wales
3. as Leader of Reform UK Wales
4. Reckless was known as the Leader of the Brexit Party in Wales for the duration of the time he was in office. The Brexit Party renamed itself Reform UK in January 2021, two months after Reckless resigned from the party to join the Abolish the Welsh Assembly Party.
5. Gill previously sat in the Senedd for UKIP between 2016 and 2017, representing North Wales, but didn't have a seat in the Senedd for the duration of his time in office as Leader of Reform Wales, having lost his recontest of North Wales for Reform in the 2021 Senedd election.
6. 64 days total starting with her time in office as acting Leader of Reform UK Wales.
