= Golwg =

Welsh-language magazine

- Categories: news magazine
- Frequency: Weekly
- Founded: 1988; 38 years ago
- Company: Golwg
- Country: United Kingdom (Wales)
- Language: Welsh
- Website: www.golwg360.com
- ISSN: 0032-888X

Golwg (Welsh for "View", Welsh pronunciation: [ˈɡɔlʊɡ]) is a Welsh-language magazine established in 1988. The magazine is published by the company with the same name on a weekly basis. It covers current events and features and claims a circulation of 12,000 a month, the largest circulation of any magazine in Wales.

In 2009 Golwg360 was launched as a website offering daily Welsh and international news in Welsh. The project is funded by the Welsh Government.

The magazine regularly features interviews with Welsh bands such as Synnwyr Cyffredin, Yws Gwynedd and The Routines.

== See also ==
- Nós - Irish language youth magazine
