= Joe Martin (Welsh politician) =

Welsh politician

Joe Martin MS
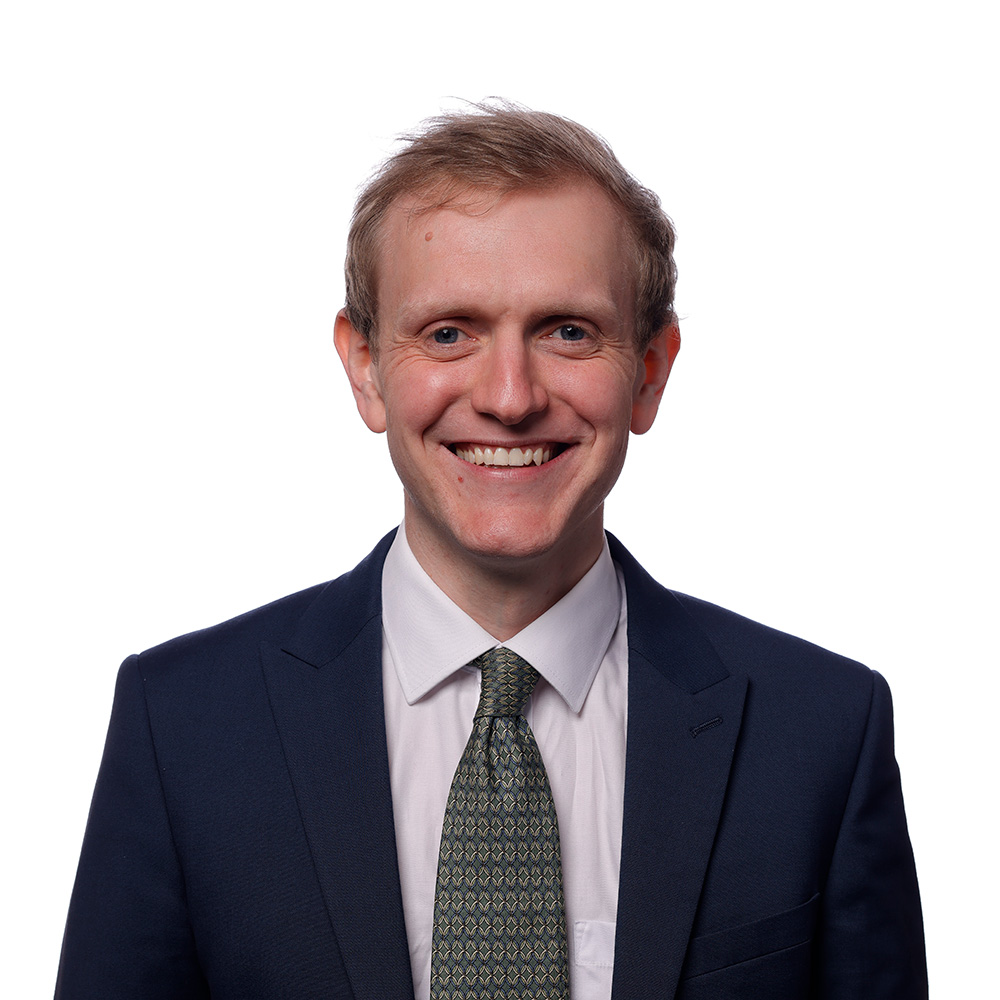
- Official portrait, 2026

Shadow Minister without Portfolio
- Incumbent
- Assumed office 23 September 2026
- Leader: Helen Jenner

Member of the Senedd for Caerdydd Penarth
- Incumbent
- Assumed office 8 May 2026
- Preceded by: Seat established

Personal details
- Party: Reform UK

Joseph Martin (born 1997 or 1998) is a Reform UK Wales politician. He was elected as Member of the Senedd (MS) for the Caerdydd Penarth constituency in May 2026. He has been shadow minister without portfolio since September 2026.

== Background ==
Martin attended the University of Exeter, where he changed degree subjects frequently, studying history for his first year, then Arabic and Theology with History in his second, and Middle Eastern studies and Theology with History in his third. He then worked in Finance at Lloyds Bank and other financial businesses.

== Political career ==
In August 2025, Martin was Reform UK's candidate in a council by-election in the Grangetown ward. He came 4th, with 15% of the vote.

In March 2026, Martin was announced as the lead candidate on Reform UK Wales's list in the Caerdydd Penarth constituency, ahead of former leader of the Wales Brexit Party, Mark Reckless. He was successfully elected, as the only Reform MS for Caerdydd Penarth.

=== Senedd rebukes ===
On 16 June 2026 Martin was accused of racism and was rebuked by the Llywydd of the Senedd, Huw Irranca-Davies, following a speech in which he claimed attacks from Sudanese asylum seekers were "inevitable". The following day, Martin made another speech in which he criticised the Welsh government's "stupid" and "pointless" international spending and drew attention to the rate of illiteracy in Wales's "underfunded" education system, joking that he had tried to ask some Welsh students for their opinion but had received no response, "because we had e-mailed them and they couldn't read". The speech prompted members of Plaid Cymru, Labour and the Green Party to walk out of the Senedd chamber in protest. Plaid Cymru's Zaynub Akbar could be heard to state, "I'm going to leave this because I don't accept any of this and I don't want to be a part of it." The speech was again rebuked by the Llywydd.

In September 2026, Martin was again rebuked by the Llywydd for comments made during a debate on the Welsh Gender Service, where he said "The Welsh Gender Service should be closed forever and the doctors in the UK who performed surgeries on children should be imprisoned for what they’ve done" and described medical staff as "liars and ... butchers", causing Mabon ap Gwynfor to distance himself "and the government" from the remarks and Heledd Fychan to ask for Martin's comments to be reviewed as a point of order. The Welsh Gender Service "provides care and support for adults over the age of 18 experiencing gender dysphoria or looking to transition".

On 10 November 2026 Martin was banned by Irranca-Davies from speaking in the Senedd until Martin apologies for his statement on demography. Martin had asked for the government to comment on the "demographic replacement of white British people". Trefnydd Heledd Fychan questioned whether Martin's comment was inline with the Senedd's standing orders, leading to Martin being banned. Irranca-Davies stated Martin's question was "unnecessarily provocative and deliberately offensive". Following Martin's ban, Reform UK partially boycotted the Senedd on 11 November, limiting their participation only to the evening's votes.

== See also ==
- 7th Senedd
- Jenner shadow cabinet
