= James Wells (British politician) =

British politician

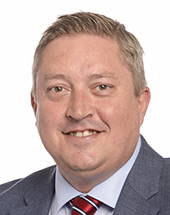

Member of the European Parliament for Wales
- In office 2 July 2019 – 31 January 2020
- Preceded by: Kay Swinburne
- Succeeded by: Constituency abolished

Personal details
- Born: January 1973 (age 53)
- Party: Restore Britain (2026–present)
- Other political affiliations: Independent (2021–2026); Reform UK (2019–2021); Conservative (before 2019)
- Education: University of Liverpool
- Occupation: Politician

James Freeman Wells (born January 1973) is a British broadcaster, former civil servant and politician. He was elected as a Brexit Party Member of the European Parliament (MEP) for the Wales constituency in the 2019 election, serving until January 2020. He was second on his party's list after Nathan Gill (former UKIP MEP).

== Early life and education ==
Wells left formal education at the age of 16. He returned to full-time education twelve years later and studied psychology at the University of Liverpool and later a Masters in the same subject at Cranfield University.

== Career ==
Prior to joining politics, he was head of the UK trade team at the Office for National Statistics. Wells quit the role and his membership to the Conservative Party in order to run as a candidate for the Brexit Party in the Wales constituency in the 2019 European Parliament election. He had only joined the Conservatives in 2018 with the purpose of being able to vote if a leadership election was called. In the election, Wells became an MEP alongside fellow Brexit Party candidate Nathan Gill.

In the European Parliament, Wells was a member of the Committee on International Trade and part of the delegation for relations with the countries of the Andean community.

Wells stood for the Brexit Party in Islwyn in the 2019 general election; he received 14% of the vote.

The Brexit Party was rebranded to Reform UK in 2021, with Wells subsequently announced as their candidate for Islwyn at the 2021 Senedd election. In total, he polled 421 votes, coming last out of all candidates. Wells also led the Reform UK list for the South Wales East region, though the party finished eighth with 1% of all votes.

By the 2022 Welsh local elections, Wells had left Reform UK, standing as an independent candidate in the Pontllanfraith ward on Caerphilly County Borough Council. He finished second-to-last with 515 votes.

On 20 February 2026, he announced he had joined Restore Britain.

== Personal life ==
Wells is married and has two children and lives in Wales. He reports that he is dyslexic.
