= Nathan Gill =

British politician and criminal (born 1973)

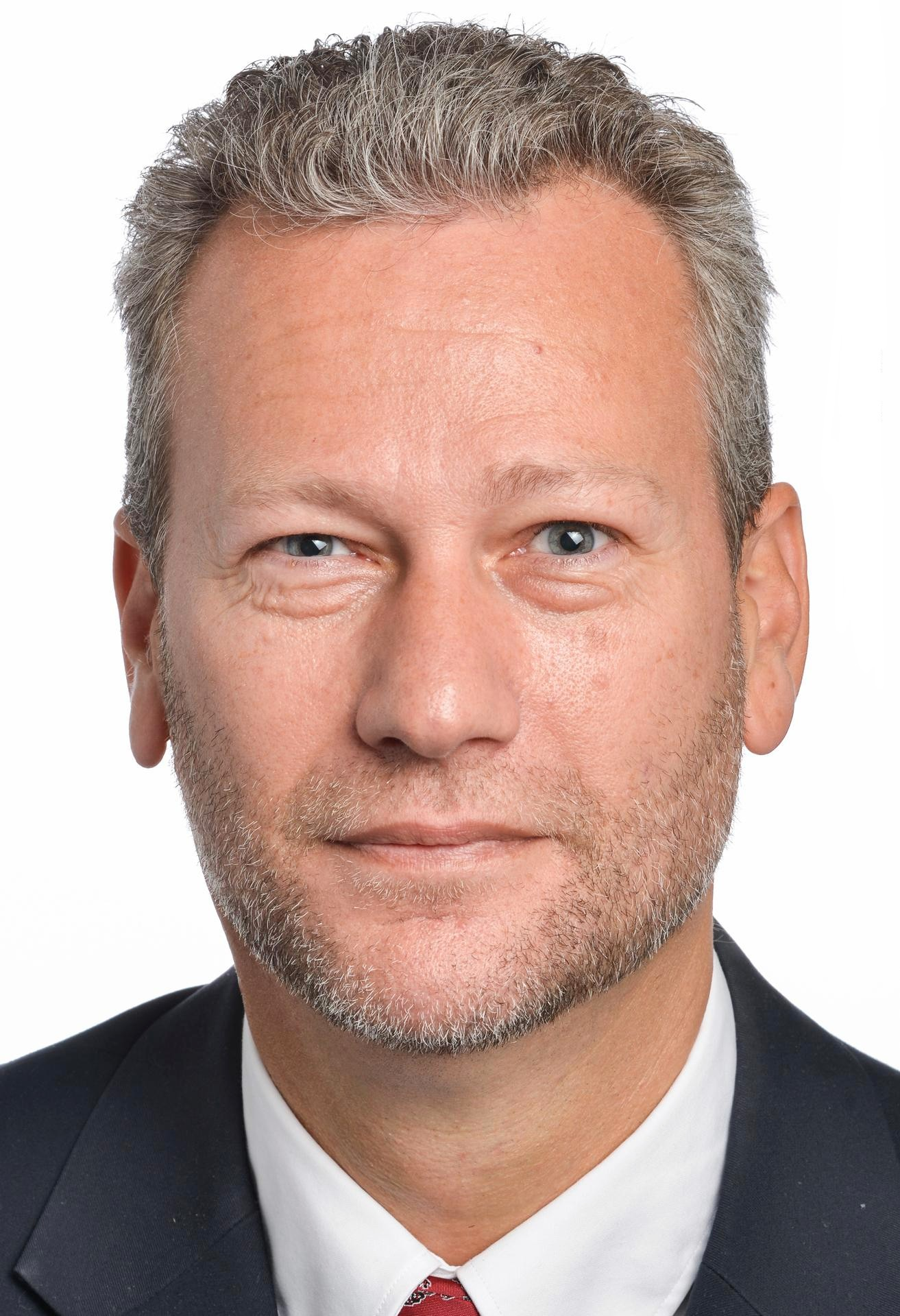
- Official portrait, 2019

Leader of Reform UK Wales
- In office 26 March 2021 – 8 May 2021
- Leader: Richard Tice
- Preceded by: Mark Reckless (Note: as Leader of the Brexit Party in Wales)
- Succeeded by: Dan Thomas (Note: Office vacant between 8 May 2021 and 5 February 2026)

Member of the European Parliament for Wales
- In office 1 July 2014 – 31 January 2020
- Preceded by: John Bufton
- Succeeded by: Constituency abolished

Leader of UKIP Wales
- In office 6 December 2014 – 26 September 2016
- Leader: Nigel Farage
- Preceded by: Office established
- Succeeded by: Neil Hamilton

Member of the National Assembly for Wales for North Wales
- In office 5 May 2016 – 27 December 2017
- Preceded by: Aled Roberts
- Succeeded by: Mandy Jones

Personal details
- Born: 6 July 1973 (age 53) Kingston upon Hull, East Riding of Yorkshire, England
- Party: Independent (2018-2019, 2021-present)
- Other political affiliations: Reform UK (2019–2021) (Note: Known as the Brexit Party from 2019 to 2020); UKIP (2004–2018); Conservative (before 2004)
- Spouse: Jana
- Children: 5
- Education: Coleg Menai
- Occupation: Businessman
- Criminal information
- Status: Incarcerated
- Conviction: United Kingdom: Bribery
- Penalty: 10 and a half years in prison

Nathan Lee Gill (born 6 July 1973) is a British former politician and convicted criminal who served as the Leader of Reform UK Wales from March to May 2021 and as Leader of UKIP Wales from 2014 to 2016. He previously served as Member of the European Parliament (MEP) for Wales from 2014 to January 2020 as well as a Member of the National Assembly for Wales from May 2016 to December 2017.

Gill served as a UK Independence Party (UKIP) MEP until his defection on 6 December 2018, and from 2016 to 2017 also an independent Member of the National Assembly for Wales.

In September 2025, Gill pleaded guilty to eight charges relating to the acceptance of bribes from a former pro-Russia Ukrainian politician to make pro-Russian statements in the European Parliament and to the media. On 21 November 2025, he was sentenced to ten and a half years in prison.

== Early life and career ==
Gill was born in England, but his family moved to Wales in the early 1980s. He was educated at Ysgol David Hughes and then Coleg Menai. After leaving the latter he joined a family-owned private company based in the East Riding of Yorkshire.

He founded and managed Burgill Ltd in March 2004, with his mother Elaine. Registered in Llangefni, Anglesey, but operating solely in Kingston upon Hull, the company provided domiciliary and home care services mainly to Hull City Council. The company employed 180 staff, chiefly from central Europe (mainly Poland) and the Philippines, to whom they optionally provided chargeable "bunkhouse"-style accommodation. In a later interview with the Western Mail after his election, Gill commented:

UKIP has never said it wants to stop all immigration – it wants to limit the numbers. People from overseas were employed because we could not find workers to do the jobs. We had a care home of our own, but mostly our workers were employed on home care contracts we had with Hull City Council and other organisations. The workers were paid more than the minimum wage, but not massively more. The amount we could afford to pay was determined by the amount of money we received from the council. Working in care is quite tough and we had a big turnover of staff.

The company collapsed and went into administration with debts of £116,000, after its main bankers HSBC withdrew its borrowing facility after the 2008 financial crisis.

Gill then moved back to Wales, where he lived in Llangefni, Isle of Anglesey, with his American wife Jana, and five children. The family are practising members of the Church of Jesus Christ of Latter-day Saints.

== Political career ==
In July 2012, he came last in the election of councillor for the Llanbedrgoch electoral division.

In May 2013, he led the UKIP group of candidates in the Anglesey local elections, which included his wife, Jana Gill (standing for Canolbarth Môn), and his sister, Jayne Gill (for Aethwy). Gill himself stood to be elected as councillor for the new electoral division of Seiriol, but he came in eighth place with 7% of the vote. The party did not win any seats on the island's council.

In August 2013, he came third behind Plaid Cymru's Rhun ap Iorwerth in the National Assembly for Wales by-election for Ynys Môn.

With John Bufton stepping down as MEP in 2014, Gill was selected as the top UKIP candidate for Wales in the European Parliament election and held the seat for the party. He received criticism for opting to drive to Strasbourg and Brussels rather than flying or using the train as media commentators claimed it allowed him to claim more on mileage expenses. Gill responded by stating he did it for practical reasons due to no direct flights being available in his constituency.

During the UKIP Wales Conference on 6 December 2014, Farage, leader of the UK Independence Party, announced that Gill would be the Leader of the Party in Wales. During the 2015 general election campaign, Gill represented UKIP in the ITV Welsh TV Leaders debate. During the election campaign, Gill denied human involvement in climate change, comments which were strongly criticised by other leaders.

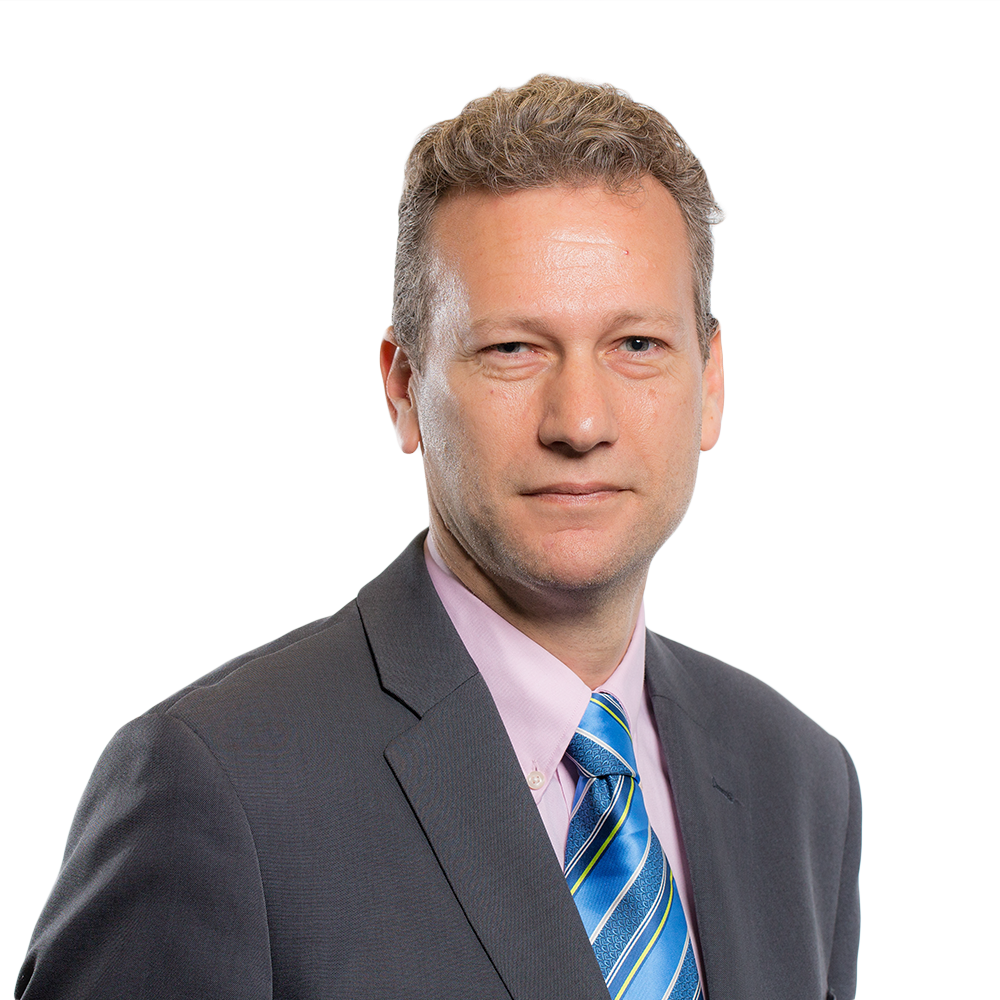
Official portrait as a Senedd member in 2016

In the 2016 Assembly election Gill won a seat representing the North Wales region. He was beaten to the post of leader of the UKIP group in the National Assembly for Wales by former Conservative MP Neil Hamilton, which Farage described as an "unjust act of deep ingratitude"; Hamilton said that Farage was simply an "MEP for South East England whose opinions were irrelevant". Gill subsequently left the UKIP group in the assembly to sit as an independent, citing much infighting and distractions. He remained a member of the party and its leader in Wales, until Neil Hamilton was made Wales leader in September 2016. Also in September 2016 Gill's media advisor Alexandra Phillips spoke to The Guardian, stating that she had left UKIP and joined the Conservatives, criticising Hamilton. Staying on as an advisor to Gill, she told BBC Wales that UKIP's foothold in Wales had become "a war zone". Gill resigned as an AM in December 2017.

On 6 December 2018, Gill resigned from UKIP, in opposition to the party leader Gerard Batten's links to far-right activist Tommy Robinson. He joined the new Brexit Party in February 2019.

He was re-elected as an MEP in Wales in the 2019 European Parliament election, alongside fellow Brexit Party candidate, James Wells.

Gill stood for MP in Caerphilly in the 2019 UK general election, and came 4th with 11.2% of the vote.

On 26 March 2021, Gill was announced as Leader of Reform UK Wales. Gill was a regional list candidate in the 2021 Senedd election for the North Wales electoral region but was not elected. He quit Reform UK shortly afterwards.

== Russian connections and bribery conviction ==
In March 2023, Nation.Cymru revealed that Gill had had multiple meetings with pro-Russian leaders in Ukraine and Moldova between May and November 2018. The meetings had been organised by men accused of being Kremlin agents. After returning from these trips, he also became a board member of 112 Ukraine and News One, both of which were shut down by the Ukrainian government.

In February 2025, Gill appeared in court charged with eight counts of bribery and one count of conspiracy to commit bribery, following an investigation by the Metropolitan Police's Counter Terrorism Command of statements he made in the European parliament and to news media about Ukraine. Initially, he denied the charges. He appeared at the Old Bailey on 14 March 2025, where his defence barrister Clare Ashcroft indicated that Gill intended to enter 'not guilty' pleas.

On 26 September 2025, Gill pleaded guilty to all eight counts of bribery between 6 December 2018 and 18 July 2019, but denied one charge of conspiracy to commit bribery. The court heard that, on at least eight occasions, Ukrainian national and pro-Kremlin politician Oleg Voloshyn instructed him to issue particular statements that would "benefit Russia regarding events in Ukraine" in exchange for payment, both in the European Parliament and to pro-Russia news outlets in Ukraine. Prosecutors allege that between 1 January 2018 and 1 February 2020, Gill worked with Voloshyn and others in a scheme to commit bribery, receiving "quantities of money in cash" during that period. Police said that he had received at least £40,000.

In October 2025, while campaigning during the Caerphilly by-election, Reform Party leader Nigel Farage said he was "deeply shocked" by Gill's admission of guilt, adding that he was a "bad apple" who had betrayed him.

On 21 November 2025, Gill was sentenced to ten and a half years in prison at the Central Criminal Court.

== Personal life ==
Gill and his wife Jana have five children. He was a practising member of The Church of Jesus Christ of Latter-day Saints, and had served as a Bishop in the church’s Anglesey ward for six years.

== Notes ==
Senedd
Preceded by Aled Roberts	Assembly Member for North Wales; 2016–2017	Succeeded by Mandy Jones
European Parliament
Preceded by John Bufton	Member of the European Parliament for Wales; 2014–2020	Constituency abolished
Party political offices
New post	Leader of UK Independence Party in Wales; 2014– 2016	Succeeded by Neil Hamilton
Preceded by Mark Reckless	Leader of Reform UK Wales; 2021	Vacant Title next held by Dan Thomas
