= Reform UK Wales =

Political party in the United Kingdom

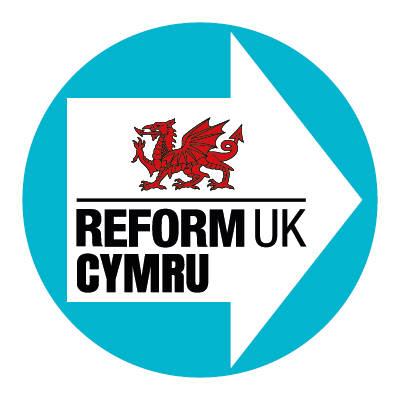
- Leader: Helen Jenner
- Deputy Leader: Laura Anne Jones
- Founder: Mark Reckless
- Founded: 15 May 2019; 7 years ago
- Ideology: Right-wing populism; Hard Euroscepticism
- Political position: Right-wing to far-right
- National affiliation: Reform UK
- Colours: Turquoise White
- Slogan: Wales needs Reform
- House of Commons: 0 / 32 (Welsh seats)
- Senedd: 33 / 96
- Local government in Wales: 23 / 1,234
- Councils led in Wales: 0 / 22
- Police and crime commissioners: 0 / 4

Reform UK Wales (Note: Alternatively Reform Wales or Reform Cymru) is the Welsh branch of the British political party Reform UK. Founded as the branch of the Brexit Party (the former name of Reform UK) in 2019, it has been led by Helen Jenner since September 2026. It participated in the 2026 Senedd election, where it emerged as the second-largest party in Wales behind Plaid Cymru, becoming the Official Opposition party.

== Leaders ==
=== Mark Reckless (2019–2020) ===
From 15 May 2019 to 19 October 2020, when the party was known as the Brexit Party, its Welsh leader was Mark Reckless, a member of the Senedd (MS) for South Wales East. Reckless was initially elected in May 2016 as a member of the UK Independence Party (UKIP). He left UKIP in 2017, and was admitted to the Conservative group in the Welsh Assembly, though not to the Conservative Party itself, however for purposes of Assembly business he was treated as a Conservative member. In 2019, Reckless left the Conservative group to sit as an independent. In May, he joined the Brexit Party and became its first Welsh leader, then leaving the party and joining the Abolish the Welsh Assembly Party. He said since Brexit had been effectively achieved, the work of the Brexit Party was complete. Two weeks later, the Brexit Party was rebranded as Reform UK.

=== Nathan Gill (2021) ===
From 26 March 2021 to 8 May the office was held by Nathan Gill. Gill was a Member of the European Parliament for Wales between July 2014 until the UK left the EU in January 2021. He was elected as a member of UKIP, before leaving to serve as an independent between 2018 and 2019, and then after joining the party, he finally served as a member of the Brexit Party from 2019, being relected as a MEP in the same year for the party. He was UKIP's Welsh Leader between 2014 and 2016, and was also a member of the Senedd for UKIP representating North Wales between 2016 and 2017. In 2018, Gill subsequently left UKIP, citing much infighting and distractions. He had disagreements with his successor as UKIP's Welsh Leader, Neil Hamilton, and was opposed to the party leader Gerard Batten's links to far-right activist Tommy Robinson. He joined the new Brexit Party in February 2019, and after the party renamed itself Reform UK in January 2021, he became its Welsh leader in March 2021. Gill was a regional list candidate in the 2021 Senedd election for the North Wales electoral region but was not elected. He quit Reform UK shortly afterwards. Gill was sentenced in November 2025 to 10 1/2 years in prison for taking bribes to make pro-Russia statements while a Member of the European Parliament.

=== Dan Thomas (February–September 2026) ===
From 2021 until 2026, the leadership of Reform UK Wales remained vacant.

On 5 February 2026, Dan Thomas was appointed as Reform's Welsh Leader. Thomas was born and grew up in Wales, but moved to London when he was 18, where he served as a Conservative Party councillor on Barnet London Borough Council from 2006 to 2025, serving as leader of the council from 2019 to 2022, and as leader of the opposition Conservative group on the council following 2022. He defected to Reform UK in June 2025. He later resigned from the council on 31 December 2025, leaving a vacant seat heading into the 2026 election, before moving to back to Wales with his family.

In his announcement regarding Thomas's appointment as Welsh Leader, Reform UK leader, Nigel Farage, said: "He has voluntarily left London, come back to the Valleys, living in Islwyn, come back to his home, and he's done that because he loves Wales." However, Nation.Cymru reported that a source told it that Thomas had actually moved to Bath, Somerset, England. Following speculation in the media about where Thomas lived, Reform UK said: "Dan lives in Wales. Any claim to the contrary is entirely false. He lives here in Wales, where he is raising his young family". They also confirmed that he owns a property portfolio, which included a property in Bath that is rented out and not his main residence. ITV Wales confirmed they had seen proof that Thomas was added to the electoral roll in the Caerphilly borough area in July 2025. A Reform UK spokesperson said: "Dan is on the electoral roll here in Wales".

On 1 April 2026, Thomas appointed Helen Jenner as Deputy Leader of Reform UK Wales. She has represented Bangor Conwy Môn since the 2026 Senedd election. She previously contested the Ynys Môn Parliamentary constituency at the 2019 general election for Reform UK under its previous name of the Brexit Party, where she came fourth out of four candidates, receiving 6% of the vote.

On 15 September 2026, Thomas resigned as Leader after being arrested on suspicion of assault and controlling or coercive behaviour, Thomas has disputed the charges and stated he has "done nothing wrong", and that he was "standing down [...] due to personal reasons".

=== Helen Jenner (September 2026–Incumbent) ===
Following Dan Thomas' resignation Helen Jenner, the Deputy Leader and MS for Bangor Conwy Môn, became acting leader, and the following day a meeting of Reform UK Senedd Members was held. The Chief Whip Llŷr Powell said the party would hold an internal vote of Senedd Members to decide the next leader, and said it would be concluded by the end of September. Powell did not rule himself out of standing, and Jenner was expected to stand. James Evans, Cai Parry-Jones, and Jason O'Connell all ruled themselves out of standing, but Evans did say he had the support of the majority of members. Despite ruling himself out publically, Jenner confirmed O'Connel did stand against her during the internal vote on 21 September, with Jenner winning with 17 against 15 votes and after she was backed by "very senior" Reform UK figures. She was announced as leader by UK leader Nigel Farage on the same day as the internal vote outside the Senedd, with Farage saying the party would "carry on as if nothing has happened”. As Leader of Reform UK Wales, Jenner also serves as the Leader the Opposition in the Senedd.

Laura Anne Jones was elected as the new deputy leader the next day, on 22 September 2026. Jones was previously suspended from the Senedd in November 2025 after she used a racial slur to describe Chinese people in a Whatsapp chat.

== History ==
Following the 2016 Senedd election UKIP, led by future Reform UK Wales leader Nathan Gill gained 7 out 60 seats with 12.5% of the vote. Following infighting within the group, all members except for Neil Hamilton left the party. Nathan Gill resigned as Senedd Member (then known as Assembly Members) to stand for the 2019 European Parliament election, he as well as 4 Senedd Members: Mandy Jones, Caroline Jones, David Rowlands, and Mark Reckless joined the newly founded Reform UK (then known as the Brexit Party); Reckless became the Senedd group leader.

In August 2020 Caroline Jones left the party to sit as an independent. In October 2020, Reckless left the party and joined Abolish the Welsh Assembly Party, while the other two members along with Caroline Jones formed the Independent Alliance for Reform. They all lost their seats in the 2021 Senedd election with Reform UK receiving only 1.1% of the vote.

In July 2025 and February 2026, Conservative Senedd Members Laura Anne Jones and James Evans respectively defected to Reform UK.

Following the May 2026 Senedd election Reform UK became the official opposition in the Senedd with 34 out of 96 seats, with 29.3% of the vote up from 1.1%. Plaid Cymru led a minority government, and Dan Thomas led the shadow cabinet.

In May 2026, a former Reform UK Senedd candidate, whose photograph was published by Nation.Cymru in which he appeared to perform a Nazi salute, became a special adviser to his party's leader, Dan Thomas.

In June 2026, former Reform UK Senedd candidate, Derek Roberts, was appointed as a special advisor to Reform UK Wales Senedd member, Gaz Thomas. Roberts quit as a Reform candidate after concerns were raised within the party about his Facebook account, due to Roberts social media featuring dozens of racist and anti-Muslim posts from 2022 to 2025. Roberts also openly posted in support of the far-right activist, Tommy Robinson.

On 15 September 2026, Dan Thomas resigned as leader of Reform UK Wales following his arrest on suspicion of assault and controlling or coercive behaviour. Deputy leader Helen Jenner became acting leader. Thomas said he would continue to serve as a Member of the Senedd.

On the same day, Reform MS Sarah Cooper-Lesadd quit the party to join Plaid Cymru, saying that Reform had "no interest in Wales" and "are not serious about governing Wales". A Reform spokesperson said that the party had planned to expel her after discovering she was in favour of Welsh independence.

== Relationship with the press ==
Reform UK have had a controversial relationship with press organisations and has avoided communicating with certain journalists, in Wales and other parts of the UK. In Wales multiple Reform UK representatives and senior figures have refused communicating or answering inquires by specific journalists following critical reporting of those individuals. The party barred independent Welsh journalist Will Hayward from attending its 2026 Senedd election manifesto launch.

The party has also been criticised for attacks, abuse and legally threats against journalists and media organisations critical of them, the National Union of Journalists condemned these actions.

== Stance on devolution ==
Reform UK ruled out abolition of the Senedd in their 2026 manifesto, after Laura Anne Jones, the party's then sole Member of the Senedd, made comments that it would be a possibility in September 2025.

Surveys have found that among Reform UK's voter base, about two thirds would support abolishing the Senedd and Welsh devolution, which is much higher than the general population, of which only 29% support abolishing the Senedd.

While the party does not officially support abolition of the Senedd, it does not support any further devolution of powers. It also did not support the increase in the number of Senedd members for the 2026 election from 60 to 96.

In June 2026, Reform UK Wales' Shadow Health Minister James Evans justified his and the party's opposition to further devolution by saying "we’re not very good in Wales at being efficient in running things".

== Election results ==
=== Senedd ===
Election	Votes	%	Seats	+/–	Pos.	Government
2021	11,730	1.1%	0 / 60	Steady	Steady	Extraparliamentary
2026	367,985	29.3%	34 / 96	▲34	▲2nd	Opposition
