= Golwg360 =

Welsh-language news website

- Screenshot of golwg360.cymru on 28 August 2018
- Website type: News
- Available in: Welsh
- Owner: Golwg Newydd
- Website: www.golwg360.com
- Launched: 2009; 17 years ago

Golwg360 (Welsh for '360 View') is a Welsh-language news website. It aims to provide a rolling news service from Wales and elsewhere, as well as sport and cultural news. Published by Golwg Newydd, it includes some content from the weekly Welsh-language magazine Golwg as well as web-only content produced by its own staff.

The website was launched in 2009 with funding from the Welsh Government. The website received 14,537 individual daily visits and 160,361 page visits during 2018–19. During 2019–20, the average daily figure for individual daily visits increased to 16,185; page visits decreased to 147,758.
