= Pen-y-bont Bro Morgannwg =

Senedd constituency (from 2026)

- County multi-member constituency for the Senedd
- Boundary of Pen-y-bont Bro Morgannwg in Wales
- Principal areas: Bridgend County Borough; Vale of Glamorgan
- Preserved county: Mid Glamorgan; South Glamorgan
- Population: 194,600 (2024)
- Major settlements: Barry, Bridgend, Cowbridge, Llantwit Major, Pencoed, Porthcawl

Current County multi-member constituency
- Created: 2026
- Seats: 6
- Created from: UK Parliament boundaries: Bridgend; Vale of Glamorgan; Previous Senedd constituencies: Bridgend; Ogmore; Vale of Glamorgan; Previous Senedd region: South Wales Central; South Wales West

Pen-y-bont Bro Morgannwg (Welsh for 'Bridgend [and] Vale of Glamorgan';) is a six-member constituency of the Senedd (Welsh Parliament; Welsh: Senedd Cymru) used in the 2026 Senedd election. It covers areas in the south-east of Wales, particularly parts of Bridgend and the Vale of Glamorgan.

It was proposed following the 2026 review of Senedd constituencies, and is a pairing of the two UK Parliament constituencies of Bridgend and Vale of Glamorgan. It has a Welsh-only name.

== Boundaries ==
A Senedd constituency comprising the boundaries of the UK Parliament constituencies of Bridgend and Vale of Glamorgan, has been proposed by the Democracy and Boundary Commission Cymru for the 2026 election to the Senedd (Welsh Parliament; Senedd Cymru). It was initially proposed using the English name Vale of Glamorgan and Bridgend in September 2024, but was renamed to Pen-y-bont Bro Morgannwg in December proposals with most constituencies using Welsh-only names. The Welsh-only name and boundaries were confirmed in the commission's final recommendations in March 2025. When announcing their candidates, Reform UK used "Bridgend, Vale of Glamorgan" instead, using the English names for the pair of UK Parliament constituencies that form it.

It encompasses parts of the principal areas (county boroughs) of Bridgend County Borough and the Vale of Glamorgan in South Wales. The constituency was established in 2026, following the passing of the Senedd Cymru (Members and Elections) Act 2024. The act legislates electoral reform of the Senedd to create 16 larger "super constituencies", pairing the 32 UK Parliament constituencies in Wales, and using a new fully proportional voting system, with each constituency electing six Members of the Senedd (MSs) rather than one previously.

== Members of the Senedd ==
Term	Election	MS	MS	MS	MS	MS	MS
7th	May 2026	Mark Hooper (PC)	Sarah Cooper-Lesadd (Ref)	Sarah Rees (PC)	Andrew RT Davies (Con)	Gareth Thomas (Ref)	Sarah Murphy (Lab)
7th	Current	Mark Hooper (PC)	Sarah Cooper-Lesadd (PC)	Sarah Rees (PC)	Andrew RT Davies (Con)	Gareth Thomas (Ref)	Sarah Murphy (Lab)

On 15 September 2026 Sarah Cooper-Lesadd, the first member on Reform UK list, defected to Plaid Cymru.

== Elections ==
=== Elections in the 2020s ===
2026 Senedd election: Pen-y-bont Bro Morgannwg
Party	Candidate	Votes	%	±%
Plaid Cymru	Mark Hooper (E) Sarah Rees (E) Luke Fletcher Marianne Cowpe Ian Johnson Iolo Caudy Dennis Clarke	27,407	33.5	+20.2
Reform	Sarah Cooper-Lesadd (E) Gareth Thomas (E) Paul Young Emma Clatworthy Valerie Ellis Dennis Coughlin	24,602	30.1	+29.1
Conservative	Andrew RT Davies (E) Altaf Hussain Jonathan Pratt Kate Thomas Rebekah Fudge Michael Bryan	12,464	15.2	−18.0
Labour	Sarah Murphy (E) Huw David Carys Stallard Jonathan Cox Jon-Paul Blundell Helen Payne Neelo Farr Rhys Goode	9,518	11.6	−24.6
Green	Amy Greenfield Saar Lenaerts Rob Sage Aaron Steer Todd Bailey Andy Roberts	4,220	5.2	+1.0
Liberal Democrats	Steven Rajam Gabriela Ferguson Paula Yates Wayne Street Joe Boyle Matthew Dixon	2,175	2.7	0.0
Independent	Caroline Jones (Note: was a member of Reform UK until 6 April 2026)	651	0.8	−2.8
Heritage	Gill White	429	0.5	New
Independent	William Jeffreys	221	0.3	New
Independent	Lucia Wyatt	114	0.1	New
Majority		2,805	3.4	New
Turnout		81,801	53.6	+5.0
Registered electors		152,519		
win (new seat)				

2021 notional result (Note: Estimate of the 2021 Senedd election result as if the revised boundaries recommended under the 2026 boundary review were in place)
Party	Vote	%	Seats
Labour	31,467	44.0	4
Conservative	22,467	31.4	2
Plaid Cymru	7,447	10.4	0
Independent	3,620	5.0	0
Liberal Democrats	1,699	2.4	0
Abolish	1,488	2.1	0
Green	1,157	1.6	0
Reform UK	1,020	1.4	0
Propel	589	0.8	0
Gwlad	352	0.5	0
Freedom Alliance	207	0.3	0
