= Mark Reckless =

British politician (born 1970)

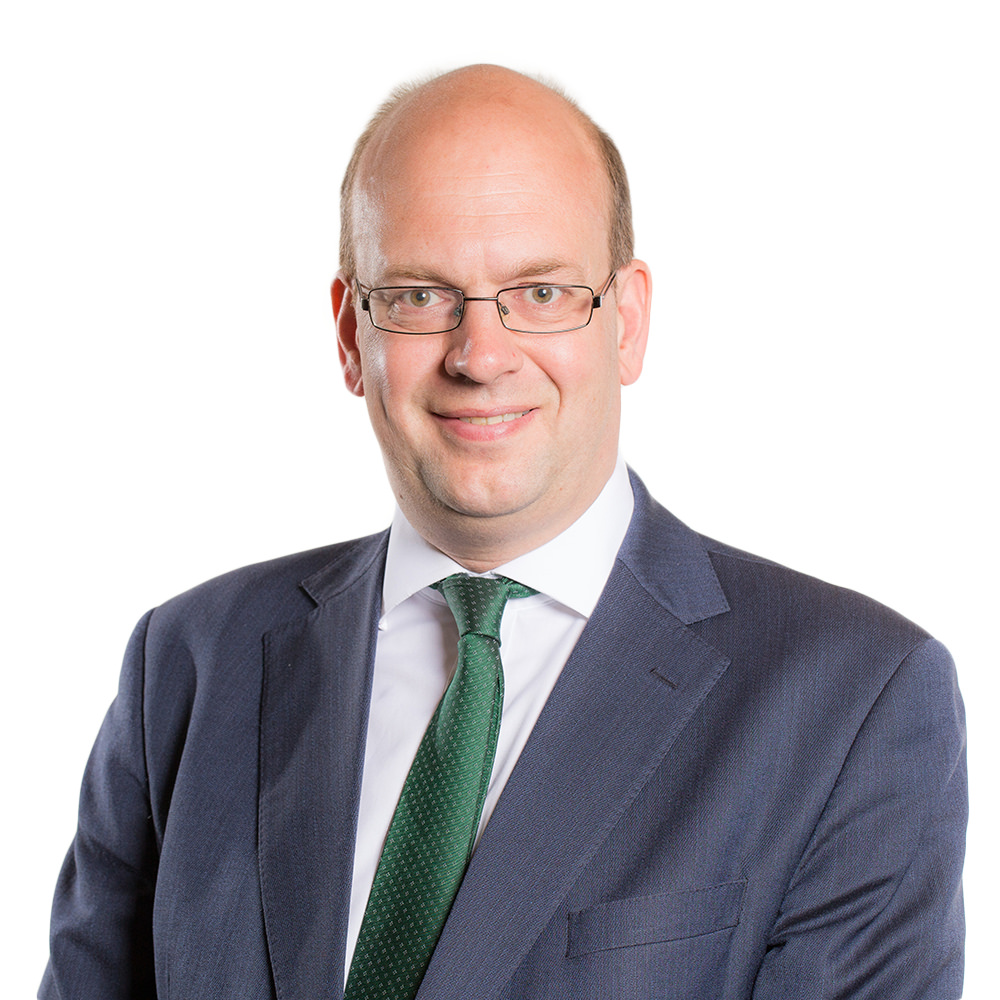
- Reckless in 2016

Leader of the Brexit Party in Wales
- In office 15 May 2019 – 19 October 2020
- Leader: Nigel Farage
- Preceded by: Office established
- Succeeded by: Nathan Gill (Note: as Leader of Reform UK Wales)

Member of the Senedd for South Wales East
- In office 5 May 2016 – 29 April 2021
- Preceded by: William Graham
- Succeeded by: Natasha Asghar

UKIP Spokesperson for Economics
- In office 18 August 2015 – 6 April 2017
- Leader: Nigel Farage; Diane James; Paul Nuttall
- Preceded by: Patrick O'Flynn
- Succeeded by: Patrick O'Flynn

Member of Parliament for Rochester and Strood
- In office 6 May 2010 – 30 March 2015
- Preceded by: Bob Marshall-Andrews (Medway)
- Succeeded by: Kelly Tolhurst

Personal details
- Born: Mark John Reckless; 6 December 1970 (age 55) London, England
- Party: Reform UK (2019–2020; (Note: Known as the Brexit Party until 2021.) 2024–present)
- Other political affiliations: Abolish the Welsh Assembly Party (2020–2021); Independent (Note: Member of the Conservative Group in the Senedd in 2017–2019.) (2017–2019; 2021–2024); UK Independence Party (2014–2017); Conservative (2002–2014)
- Spouse: Catriona Brown
- Education: Christ Church, Oxford; The University of Law; Columbia Business School
- Website: Official website

Mark John Reckless (born 6 December 1970) is a British politician and lawyer who served as a Member of the Senedd (MS) for South Wales East from 2016 until 2021, having previously served as Member of Parliament (MP) for Rochester and Strood from 2010 to 2015. Initially a member of the Conservative Party, he crossed the floor to join the UK Independence Party (UKIP) in September 2014. He has since changed parties a further four times. He is currently a member of Reform UK.

While a member of the House of Commons, Reckless was noted for his rebelliousness; he cast 56 votes against the whip between 2010 and 2014, making him the 13th most rebellious Conservative Party MP in the period. He led a rebellion of 53 Conservative MPs on the EU budget, which inflicted the first House of Commons defeat on the coalition government. From November 2010, he served as a member of the Home Affairs Select Committee. After crossing the floor, he won re-election as a UKIP MP in a by-election held in November 2014 but lost his seat to the Conservatives at the 2015 general election.

A Eurosceptic, Reckless was elected to the National Assembly for Wales, later known as the Senedd, in 2016. He campaigned to leave the European Union in the 2016 EU membership referendum. He subsequently left UKIP to join the Conservative group in the National Assembly before joining the Brexit Party in 2019 when he was appointed its leader in the National Assembly by Nigel Farage. On 19 October 2020, Reckless joined the Abolish the Welsh Assembly Party; the party lost both of its seats in the 2021 Senedd election.

== Personal life and career ==
Born in London, Reckless is a grandson of Henry McDevitt, who served as a Fianna Fáil TD for Donegal East in Dáil Éireann, the lower house of the Oireachtas (the Irish parliament), from 1938 until 1943. His mother emigrated to Great Britain when she was 17 to train as a nurse; however, Reckless has said that he does not see his mother as an "immigrant" and stated "I don't consider myself to have an immigrant background".

Reckless was educated at Marlborough College before attending Christ Church, Oxford, where he read philosophy, politics and economics. He then pursued postgraduate studies at Columbia Business School in the United States, receiving an MBA. At Columbia he studied alongside writer Jacob Appel, and is the subject of several thinly veiled anecdotes in Appel's satire The Man Who Wouldn't Stand Up. After university, he trained as a barrister at the College of Law, gaining an LLB, and was called to the Bar in 2007.

In the mid-1990s, Reckless worked for UBS Warburg. In the late 1990s, he worked as a strategy consultant and associate in Financial Services Group at Booz Allen Hamilton. Until his election in May 2010, Reckless had been a solicitor at Herbert Smith and had worked on legal matters that had had dealings with private investigators. He was a member of the Kent Police Authority from 2007 to 2011.

He married Catriona Brown at Westminster Cathedral on 1 October 2011; the reception was held in the Palace of Westminster. His best man was Daniel Hannan MEP. Reckless had been the best man at Hannan's wedding. In May 2015 Catriona Brown-Reckless was elected as a UKIP Councillor for Strood South in Medway. She resigned in September 2016. In May 2022 she was elected as a Welsh Conservative Councillor for the ward of Pentyrch and St Fagans in Cardiff.

== Political career ==
At the 2001 General Election, Reckless stood as the Conservative Party candidate for the Medway constituency, coming second. During the campaign he caused controversy by handing out a leaflet which claimed incumbent Labour MP Bob Marshall-Andrews "had a target" to admit 10,000 refugees per week. Andrews responded saying he was quoted out of context in relation to assisting people fleeing genocide during the Kosovo War.

Between 2002 and 2014, Reckless was a member of the policy unit at Conservative Central Office where he wrote a book on deregulation policy as well as overseeing the development of the policy on directly elected police commissioners. The first police and crime commissioner elections took place on 15 November 2012.

In 2002, he was selected again to contest the Medway constituency at the 2005 UK general election. He again came second in the seat, although his opponent Bob Marshall Andrews' majority was reduced significantly, from 3,750 to 213.

Reckless served as a Medway councillor between 2007 and 2011.

=== Member of Parliament ===
In 2008, Reckless was selected to contest the Rochester and Strood constituency for the Conservative Party. He was elected at the 2010 general election. The UK Independence Party did not stand a candidate of their own in Rochester and Strood in 2010, instead endorsing Reckless, and deploying their leader, Malcolm Pearson to campaign for him.

Reckless was elected to the Home Affairs Select Committee in 2010. In this capacity he often appeared on Newsnight and other political programmes, arguing for the deportation of clerics Abu Hamza and Abu Qatada. He was one of parliament's most rebellious MPs and was the 13th-most rebellious Conservative MP between 2010 and 2014, casting 56 votes against the whip. He was one of only six Conservative MPs to vote against increase of university tuition fees, and was a critic of the government's energy policy, arguing that the government's Energy Bill introduced in December 2012 was "a sad retreat for Conservatives".

In July 2010, Reckless apologised for missing a vote on the budget because he was drunk. He said that he "did not feel it was appropriate to take part in the vote because of the amount he had drunk". In 2011, he abstained on the military intervention in Libya.

A Eurosceptic, Reckless is also a critic of the European Court of Human Rights, saying it erodes "British freedom and democracy".

He was chair of the all-party parliamentary group on Georgia. The group's aims are "to facilitate greater parliamentary awareness of developments in Georgia".

On 30 September 2014, Reckless applied for the Stewardship of the Chiltern Hundreds and therefore ceased to be an MP. A by-election was called on 20 November, at which Reckless was nominated to stand as the UKIP candidate. He was returned as a member of parliament for UKIP, becoming the party's second elected MP.

==== European Union budget rebellion ====
On 31 October 2012, Reckless led a rebellion of 53 Conservative MPs which inflicted the first House of Commons defeat (307 votes to 294) on the coalition government. The Tory rebels voted with Labour MPs to pass an amendment calling for a real-terms cut in the 2014–2020 EU budget multi-annual financial framework. The coalition government supported only a real-terms freeze in the EU budget as a minimum. The amendment was not binding on the government, but damaged prime minister David Cameron's authority on Europe before key EU budget negotiations in November 2012.

==== Defection to UKIP ====
On 27 September 2014, Reckless defected to the UK Independence Party at its party conference in Doncaster, and announced his resignation in order to seek re-election at a by-election. He became the second Conservative MP in the space of a month to defect to UKIP, the first being his close friend Douglas Carswell. In a speech delivered to the conference, Reckless claimed that the Conservative leadership was 'not serious about real change on Europe', and that 'Britain could be better'.

Although he won the by-election on 20 November 2014 as a UKIP candidate, in the 2015 general election Reckless lost his seat to the Conservative candidate, Kelly Tolhurst.

In June 2015, Reckless was made Director of Policy Development by UKIP.

=== Member of the Senedd ===
In March 2016, Reckless was announced as UKIP's lead candidate for the regional seat of South Wales East despite having no previous links to Wales. He was elected on 5 May 2016.

On 6 April 2017, Reckless left UKIP to join the Conservative Group; however, he did not rejoin the Conservative Party. This move made the Conservative group the second-largest in the Welsh Assembly. Upon leaving, he said, "I leave UKIP positively, having achieved our joint aim, a successful referendum to leave the EU".

On 14 April 2019, Reckless left the Conservative Group over the party's failure to deliver Brexit. He then sat as an independent member before joining the Brexit Party the following month.

On 15 May 2019, Reckless stated his intention to form a new Brexit Party political group in the Senedd, along with Caroline Jones, Mandy Jones, and David Rowlands, with himself as the leader of the group. In July 2020, he attracted criticism from pro-devolution Brexit Party volunteers when he stated that he would support the campaign to abolish the Senedd. He then left the party and joined the Abolish the Welsh Assembly Party. He said, since Brexit had been effectively achieved, the work of the Brexit Party was complete. Two weeks later, the Brexit Party was rebranded as Reform UK.

Reckless was the Abolish candidate for Monmouth at the 2021 Senedd election, taking 1,173 votes (3.3%). He notably came behind the Conservative-turned-independent MS Nick Ramsay, who was also unsuccessful in his re-election bid. Additionally, Reckless was the lead Abolish candidate in South Wales East, with the party receiving 9,995 list votes (4.8%), and no seats.

=== Post-Senedd ===
In November 2024, Reckless appeared at Reform UK's Wales conference as a speaker and member of the party. He was later confirmed by Caroline Jones, also of Reform Wales, to be working on Reform's policies for Wales at the 2026 election. In March 2026, Reckless was announced as Reform's second place candidate on their list for the Caerdydd Penarth constituency. Reform only won one seat in Caerdydd Penarth, electing Joseph Martin but not Reckless; if Martin vacates the seat, Reckless will become an MS again.

== Electoral history ==
- 2026 Senedd election, Caerdydd Penarth
- 2016 Welsh Assembly election, South Wales East

Rochester and Strood, 2015

General election 2015: Rochester and Strood
Party	Candidate	Votes	%	±%
Conservative	Kelly Tolhurst	23,142	44.1	−5.1
UKIP	Mark Reckless	16,009	30.5	N/A
Labour	Naushabah Khan	10,396	19.8	−8.7
Green	Clive Gregory	1,516	2.9	+1.4
Liberal Democrats	Prue Bray	1,251	2.4	−13.9
TUSC	Dan Burn	202	0.4	+0.4
Majority		7,133	13.6	
Turnout		52,516	66.5	
Conservative gain from UKIP		Swing	-17.8	

Rochester and Strood 2014

See 2014 Rochester and Strood by-election

Rochester and Strood by-election, 20 November 2014
Party	Candidate	Votes	%	±%
UKIP	Mark Reckless	16,867	42.1	N/A
Conservative	Kelly Tolhurst	13,947	34.8	−14.4
Labour	Naushabah Khan	6,713	16.8	−11.7
Green	Clive Gregory	1,692	4.2	+2.7
Liberal Democrats	Geoff Juby	349	0.9	−15.5
Monster Raving Loony	Hairy Knorm Davidson	151	0.4	N/A
Independent	Stephen Goldsborough	69	0.2	N/A
People Before Profit	Nick Long	69	0.2	N/A
Britain First	Jayda Fransen	56	0.1	N/A
Independent	Mike Barker	54	0.1	N/A
Independent	Charlotte Rose	43	0.1	N/A
Patriotic Socialist Party	Dave Osborn	33	0.1	N/A
Independent	Christopher Challis	22	0.1	N/A
Majority		2,920	7.3	
Turnout		40,065	50.6	−14.3
UKIP gain from Conservative		Swing	28.3%	

Rochester and Strood 2010

The Rochester and Strood seat was fought for the first time at the 2010 general election. Following its boundary review of parliamentary representation in Kent, the Boundary Commission for England renamed the Medway (UK Parliament constituency) seat to Rochester and Strood. This is because the commission agreed that the term Medway is now primarily used for the larger unitary authority.

General election 2010: Rochester and Strood
Party	Candidate	Votes	%	±%
Conservative	Mark Reckless	23,604	49.2	+6.6
Labour	Teresa Murray	13,651	28.5	−13.1
Liberal Democrats	Geoff Juby	7,800	16.3	+3.9
English Democrat	Ron Sands	2,182	4.5	N/A
Green	Simon Marchant	734	1.5	N/A
Majority		9,953	20.7	
Turnout		47,971	64.9	+2.5
Conservative gain from Labour		Swing	+9.8	

Medway 2005

General election 2005: Medway
Party	Candidate	Votes	%	±%
Labour	Bob Marshall-Andrews	17,333	42.2	−6.8
Conservative	Mark Reckless	17,120	41.7	+2.5
Liberal Democrats	Geoffrey Juby	5,152	12.5	+3.2
UKIP	Bob Oakley	1,488	3.6	+1.1
Majority		213	0.5	
Turnout		41,093	61.1	1.6
Labour hold		Swing	-4.6	

Medway 2001

General election 2001: Medway
Party	Candidate	Votes	%	±%
Labour	Bob Marshall-Andrews	18,914	49.0	+0.1
Conservative	Mark Reckless	15,134	39.2	+2.3
Liberal Democrats	Geoffrey Juby	3,604	9.3	−0.8
UKIP	Nikki Sinclaire	958	2.5	+1.6
Majority		3,780	9.8	
Turnout		38,610	59.5	−12.8
Labour hold		Swing		

== See also ==
- List of elected British politicians who have changed party affiliation

== Notes ==
Parliament of the United Kingdom
New constituency	Member of Parliament for Rochester and Strood; 2010–2015	Succeeded by Kelly Tolhurst
Senedd
Preceded by William Graham	Member of the Senedd for South Wales East; 2016 –2021	Succeeded by Natasha Asghar
Political offices
Preceded by Patrick O'Flynn	Economics Spokesman of the UK Independence Party; 2015–2017	Succeeded by Patrick O'Flynn
