= Cai Parry-Jones =

Welsh politician (born 1996)

Cai Parry-Jones MS
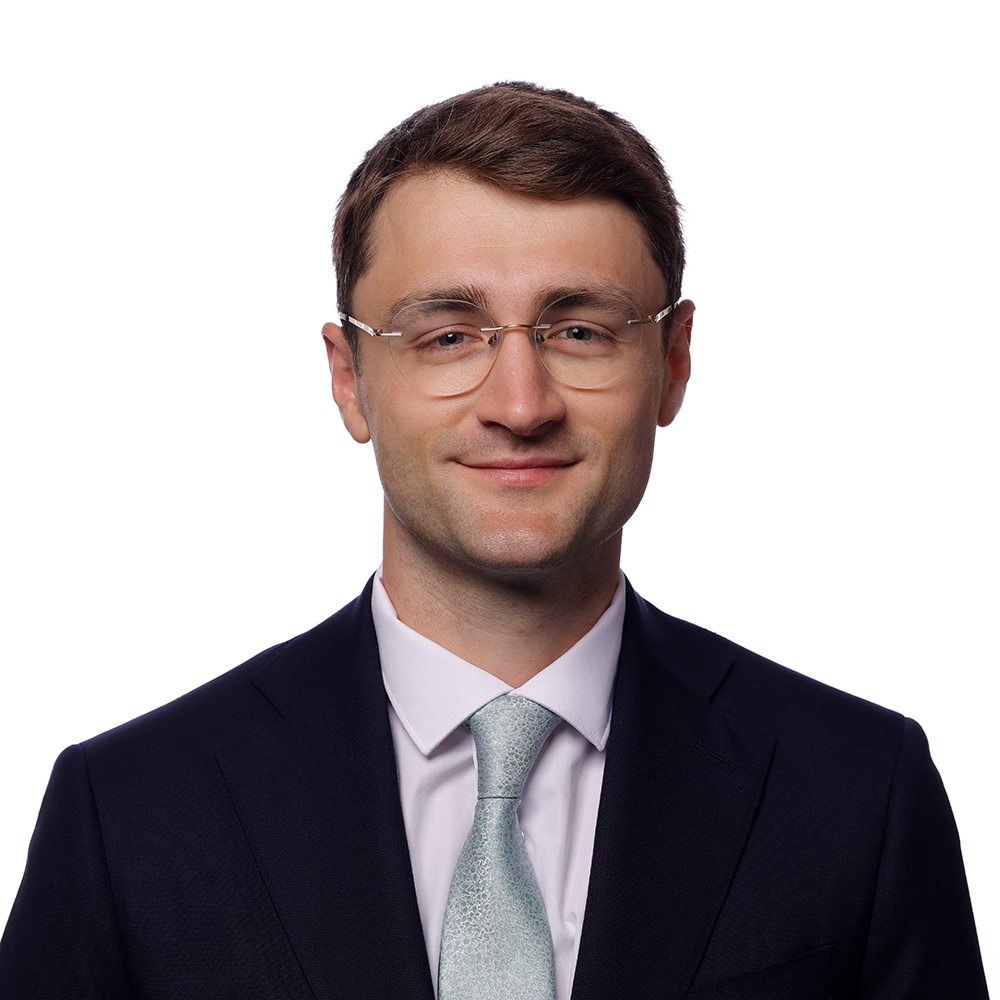
- Official portrait, 2026

Shadow Cabinet Minister for Finance and Government Efficiency
- Incumbent
- Assumed office 19 May 2026
- Leader: Dan Thomas
- Preceded by: Sam Rowlands

Member of the Senedd for Caerdydd Ffynnon Taf
- Incumbent
- Assumed office 8 May 2026

Personal details
- Born: July 1996 (age 30) Bangor, Wales
- Party: Reform UK
- Education: University of Exeter; University of Cambridge

Cai Tomos Parry-Jones (born July 1996) is a Welsh politician for Reform UK Wales who has served as Member of the Senedd for Caerdydd Ffynnon Taf since May 2026. He also serves as Shadow Cabinet Minister for Finance and Government Efficiency in Reform UK's Senedd shadow cabinet. Before entering politics, he worked as a data professional.

== Early life and education ==
Parry-Jones was born in Bangor in July 1996 and grew up on his family's farm on Anglesey. His father worked as a farmer and as a porter for the NHS, and his mother is an NHS psychologist.

He was educated at Ysgol Gyfun Llangefni, a state school, before studying economics at the University of Exeter, where he graduated with a first-class degree in 2017. He was later awarded a James Pantyfedwen Foundation scholarship to study for a master's degree in economics and data science at the University of Cambridge, and represented the university at an international econometrics competition in Amsterdam. He has said that part of his reason for undertaking the master's degree was to prepare for a career in politics.

== Professional career ==
After graduating, Parry-Jones worked in the data sector for several years, initially at technology start-ups in London, including the mobile software company Sliide and the video game developer Dovetail Games, and later at the financial technology company Revolut. He also ran his own data consultancy, Cai Data Ltd.

== Political career ==
Parry-Jones joined Reform UK in 2023; it is the only political party he has been a member of. He was deputy chairman of Reform UK's Bangor Conwy Môn branch from September 2025 to May 2026. In November 2025, as a Reform UK spokesman, he called for a review of the relationship between the BBC and Plaid Cymru after party leader Nigel Farage accused the broadcaster of left-wing bias; BBC Wales responded that its news teams were committed to impartial coverage of all political parties. He was the Reform UK Wales candidate for the Caerdydd Ffynnon Taf constituency at the 2026 Senedd election.

Following his election, Parry-Jones was appointed to Reform UK's shadow cabinet in the Senedd as Shadow Cabinet Minister for Finance and Government Efficiency. In his first weeks as a member he called for the removal of the Ukrainian flag flown outside the Senedd, describing it as "virtue signalling" while restating his support for Ukraine, and pledged to seek the reinstatement of GB News on the Senedd's internal television network.

In June 2026 he opened his first debate in the Senedd, calling for an end to all Welsh Government international spending, which stood at £9.2 million in the 2025–26 budget; the Welsh Government said this represented 0.031% of its total budget. In an interview with WalesOnline the same month, he said he was comfortable being seen as a disruptor.

Shortly after taking office in May 2026, he posted an image on social media claiming that the Senedd Commission had issued members with two £2,000 laptops and a £1,000 mobile phone. The claim was criticised by Nation.Cymru after figures from the Senedd IT department contradicted his cost estimates, confirming that members are issued two laptops, one worth £1,521, another worth £1,771 (chamber-docked device), and an iPhone worth £799.

Parry-Jones was also criticised by Nation.Cymru in May 2026 for his comments around accessibility signage used in the Senedd to accommodate autistic attendees, claiming that they were a waste of taxpayers money. Responding to Nation.Cymru Parry-Jones said he was not ridiculing people with autism and that he had "been told by a number of (non-medical) people that I have autism". Parry-Jones referred the publication to IPSO, the press regulator. They rejected his claim, stating that Nation.Cymru's reporting was factual.

After the Senedd voted to ban greyhound racing in March 2026, Parry-Jones used First Minister's Questions to ask Rhun ap Iorwerth whether the Welsh Government would follow calls to ban jump horse racing, arguing that racing was culturally and economically significant; ap Iorwerth replied only that the greyhound racing vote had been a free vote.

In July 2026, Parry-Jones faced renewed scrutiny after journalist Will Hayward reported that he held shares valued at over £38,000 in Phillips 66, registered as an interest in the Senedd, an American oil company, while having criticised Welsh government climate related roles and regulation. Parry-Jones has responded by critising Will on X, claiming that "he's the more likely culprit of deliberate misinformation".

Additionally, in July 2026, amid heightened concern for the safety of politicians following the killing of the Reform UK spokesperson Ann Widdecombe, Parry-Jones disclosed that he and his family had received a death threat, describing such threats of violence against politicians as a "direct attack on democracy and needs the toughest response". South Wales Police confirmed to BBC Wales that the threat has been reported in June, with no arrests made.
