= Helen Jenner =

Welsh politician (born 1988)

Helen Jenner MS
- Official portrait, 2026

Leader of the Opposition in Wales
- Incumbent
- Assumed office 15 September 2026
- Monarch: Charles III
- First Minister: Rhun ap Iorwerth
- Deputy: Laura Anne Jones
- Preceded by: Dan Thomas

Leader of Reform UK Wales
- Incumbent
- Assumed office 21 September 2026 (Note: Acting from 15 September – 21 September 2026)
- Deputy: Laura Anne Jones
- UK party leader: Nigel Farage
- Preceded by: Dan Thomas

Deputy Leader of the Opposition in Wales
- In office 19 May 2026 – 15 September 2026
- Leader: Dan Thomas
- Preceded by: Paul Davies
- Succeeded by: Laura Anne Jones

Deputy Leader of Reform UK Wales
- In office 1 April 2026 – 15 September 2026
- Leader: Dan Thomas
- Preceded by: Office established
- Succeeded by: Laura Anne Jones

Shadow Cabinet Minister for the Welsh Language (Note: Served as Shadow Cabinet Minister for Education and the Welsh Language from 19 May to 15 September 2026)
- Incumbent
- Assumed office 19 May 2026
- Leader: Dan Thomas; Herself
- Preceded by: Samuel Kurtz

Member of the Senedd
- Incumbent
- Assumed office 8 May 2026
- Constituency: Bangor Conwy Môn

Personal details
- Born: Helen Smith; 1988 (age 37–38) Neath, Neath Port Talbot, Wales
- Party: Reform UK Wales
- Other political affiliations: UK Independence Party (2015–2019)
- Spouse: Emmett Jenner (m. 2016)
- Children: 2
- Education: Bangor University (BA)

Helen Jenner (née Smith; born 1988) is a Welsh politician who has served as Leader of the Opposition in Wales and Leader of Reform UK Wales since September 2026. She has served as Member of the Senedd (MS) for Bangor Conwy Môn since May 2026. She was Deputy Leader of the Opposition in Wales and Deputy Leader of Reform UK Wales from April to September 2026.

Born in Neath, Jenner was raised in Anglesey and studied English literature at Bangor University, later obtaining a Postgraduate Certificate in Education. She first worked as a civil servant before working as a teacher for several years at schools in England and Wales. She joined the UK Independence Party in 2011 and stood as the Brexit Party candidate for Ynys Môn at the 2019 general election, finishing in fourth.

Jenner was appointed Deputy Leader of Reform UK Wales in 2026 under Dan Thomas, and elected to the Senedd in the 2026 election. She was appointed into the shadow cabinet as Deputy Leader of the Opposition and Shadow Cabinet Minister for Education and the Welsh Language. She became interim leader of Reform UK Wales in September following Thomas' resignation, and was elected to the position permanently later that month, defeating Jason O'Connell in the subsequent leadership election.

== Early life and career ==
Jenner was born Helen Smith, in Neath in 1988 to Gill, a teacher from Neath of 23 years at Ysgol David Hughes, and Alan, a worker from Liverpool for an insulated cable manufacturer. Jenner was a middle child, having two brothers who went on to serve in the British Armed Forces. Her maternal grandfather was a miner. At the age of two, Jenner and her family moved to Anglesey for her father's work, where she was raised in Mallfraeth, Bodorgan.

She was educated through Welsh-medium education and attended Ysgol Bodorgan, Ysgol Llanfairpwll, and then Ysgol David Hughes. She studied A-level at David Hughes, where she took drama, English, and law. Considering a career in journalism, Jenner studied at Bangor University, where she graduated with a Bachelor of Arts (BA) in English literature. When she was in university, Jenner had her hair dyed pink and performed as a vocalist in a punk rock band called The Mephs, short for Mephistophelean Engines of Pleasure. She performed at the Eisteddfod, both in a choir and reciting.

Following her graduation, Jenner moved to Manchester with a former partner and worked as a civil servant in Congleton, during which time she worked on the 2011 census. She then worked at Trafford Centre while simultaneously volunteering as a literary tutor at a school in Moss Side. After her time volunteering, Jenner "clicked" with teaching despite it being "the one job she never wanted to do", and eventually obtained a Postgraduate Certificate in Education (PGCE) at Bangor University. She worked as a substitute teacher at Ysgol Friars and Ysgol Gyfun Llangefni, before then acquiring a parental leave job at Eaton Bank Academy in Congleton, and later teaching English at Weaverham High School in Northwich.

After moving into London with her husband, she worked for several years at the BRIT School, a performing and creative arts secondary school in Croydon. She had also worked as a teacher at a primary school, and as an English teacher for several years at Ysgol David Hughes. Jenner returned to Anglesey with her husband in March 2019, where she lived with her parents, citing hiraeth (homesickness).

== Political career ==
Jenner has said that she became engaged in politics after watching YouTube clips of Nigel Farage speaking in the European Parliament, and watching Farage on This Morning. In 2011, she joined the UK Independence Party (UKIP), and by 2015 had begun meeting “figures from the upper echelons of the party”, including Farage. She also has cited her father, who also a member of UKIP, as an influence to her politics.

In the 2019 general election, Jenner stood as the Brexit Party candidate for Ynys Môn. She contested the constituency while on parental leave, and during her candidacy she criticized the delay of Brexit, supported the proposed Wylfa Newydd nuclear power station, and proposed a heritage railway in Ynys Môn as a means to increase tourism. She received 2,184 votes (6%), placing forth, defeated by Conservative candidate Virginia Crosbie.

=== Reform UK Wales ===
Jenner seated in the Siambr in 2026

In April 2026, Jenner was announced as Deputy Leader of Reform UK Wales to Reform UK Wales leader Dan Thomas.

In the 2026 Senedd election, Jenner was elected as a Member of the Senedd (MS) for the six-member Bangor Conwy Môn constituency, with Reform UK Wales receiving 19,440 votes (28.1%). She was the party's lead candidate for the constituency and elected alongside John Clark. Following Plaid Cymru's victory at the election, Reform UK became the Official Opposition after becoming the largest party in the Senedd. On 19 May, Jenner was appointed into the Thomas shadow cabinet as Deputy Leader of the Opposition in Wales and Shadow Cabinet Minister for Education and the Welsh Language.

Jenner with her deputy leader Laura Anne Jones and fellow Reform MSs

On 15 September 2026, Jenner became the interim leader of Reform UK Wales, following Dan Thomas' resignation as leader, which came after a false allegation led to his arrest on suspicion of assault and controlling or coercive behaviour and subsequently released. On 17 November 2026 the police dropped the investigation saying no further action will be taken. On 21 September, Jenner was elected as permanent leader in the subsequent leadership election held by the 33 Reform UK MSs, receiving 17 votes against 15 for Jason O'Connell. The result was announced by Reform UK leader Nigel Farage on the steps of the Senedd building, who said "I've known Helen for many, many years", describing her as a determined campaigner and "someone I trust". On 22 September, Jenner appointed Laura Anne Jones as her deputy, and fully announced her shadow cabinet on 23 September. Jenner's education portfolio was given to Stephen Senior, leaving her as Shadow Cabinet Minister for the Welsh Language.

== Electoral history ==
Election	Seat	Party	Votes	Percentage (%)	Result	Source
General, 2019	Ynys Môn	Brexit Party	2,184	6	Not elected	
Senedd, 2026	Bangor Conwy Môn	Reform UK Wales	19,440	28.1	Elected	

== Political positions ==
=== Abortion ===
Jenner speaking in the Siambr in 2026

In September 2026, a Reform UK Wales spokesperson told The i Paper that Jenner "believes in a woman's right to choose" in regards to abortion. In 2018, after the Thirty-sixth Amendment of the Constitution of Ireland liberalising abortion laws was passed, Jenner wrote on a blog "never forget that abortion is always a tragedy, not something to celebrate", adding "I find it beyond repulsive that people, mainly women, were rejoicing, crying tears of happiness and hugging".

=== Education ===
In an interview with the BBC Cymru Wales political podcast Walescast, Jenner said that the Welsh Government targets for increasing Welsh language speakers required a "different approach", and has encouraged bilingual education. She has also supported the reintroduction of grammar schools.

=== European Union ===
Helen has supported Brexit since 2012. Her opposition to the European Union has focused on its relation with Wales, including what she described in 2019 as "misleading claims" about EU-funded projects and the "adverse effects" of EU regulations on business, agriculture and fishing.

=== Welsh independence ===
After First Minister of Wales and Plaid Cymru leader Rhun ap Iorwerth signed a pro-independence agreement in September 2026, Jenner said during First Minister's Questions that Plaid had "no mandate to push for this dangerous pet project", arguing focus should be put on public services "rather than ripping our country apart".

== Personal life ==
Jenner married her husband, Emmett Jenner, in August 2016. They have two children, a son and daughter who are both taught through Welsh-medium education. The couple met at a house party in London organized by the Young Independents (the youth wing of UKIP), on New Year's Day 2016, while Helen was working as a teacher and living in Warrington. Emmett was the Reform UK candidate for Ynys Môn in the 2021 Senedd election and for Ynys Môn again in the 2024 general election. He had also stood as the UKIP candidate for Bromley and Chislehurst in the 2015 general election.

Jenner has described herself as a "proud British person" but "first and foremost" a "very proud Welsh person". She is a fluent speaker of the Welsh language, and works as a freelance English tutor. In 2019, she was studying for a master's degree in creative writing. Jenner is a fan of the Harry Potter series.

== See also ==
- 7th Senedd
- List of female members of the Senedd
- List of Reform UK politicians

== Notes ==
Political offices
Preceded by Natasha Asghar	Shadow Cabinet Minister for the Education; 2026	Succeeded by Stephen Senior
Preceded by Paul Davies	Deputy Leader of the Opposition in Wales; 2026	Succeeded by Laura Anne Jones
Preceded by Samuel Kurtz	Shadow Cabinet Minister for the Welsh Language; 2026–present	Incumbent
Preceded by Dan Thomas	Leader of the Opposition in Wales; 2026–present	Incumbent
Party political offices
Preceded by Dan Thomas	Leader of Reform UK Wales; 2026–present	Incumbent
New title	Deputy Leader of Reform UK Wales; 2026	Succeeded by Laura Anne Jones
