= Gaz Thomas =

Welsh politician

Gaz Thomas MS
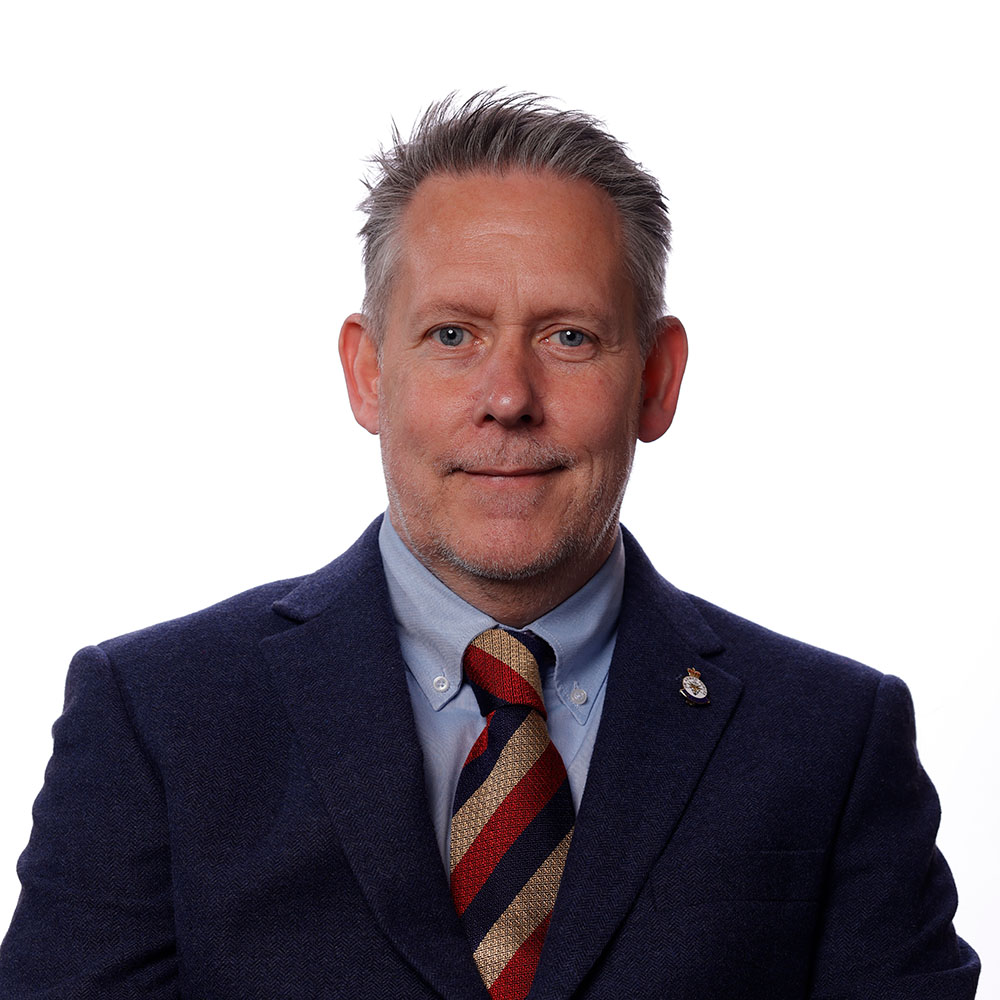
- Official portrait, 2026

Shadow Minister for Disabilities, Mental Health and Veterans
- Incumbent
- Assumed office 19 May 2026
- Leader: Dan Thomas
- Preceded by: New role

Member of the Senedd for Pen-y-bont Bro Morgannwg
- Incumbent
- Assumed office 8 May 2026
- Preceded by: Seat established

Personal details
- Party: Reform UK

Gareth "Gaz" Thomas is a Welsh politician who has served as a Member of the Senedd (MS) for Pen-y-bont Bro Morgannwg since May 2026.

A member of Reform UK Wales, Thomas unsuccessfully contested Merthyr Tydfil and Aberdare in the 2024 general election, coming second to Welsh Labour's Gerald Jones.

== Background ==
Thomas is a full-time wheelchair user, after being discharged from the Army with a spinal cord injury.

== Political career ==
Thomas stood unsuccessfully with Reform in the 2024 United Kingdom general election for the Merthyr Tydfil and Aberdare constituency, coming in 2nd place with 8,344 votes.

At the 2026 Senedd election, Thomas was elected to represent the Pen-y-bont Bro Morgannwg constituency.

== Stances ==
Thomas opposes the direct incorporation of the Convention on the Rights of Persons with Disabilities into Welsh law - instead supporting a separate Welsh piece of legislation, due to opposition to global organisations having influence on national politics.

== See also ==
- 7th Senedd
