= Nation.Cymru =

Welsh news service

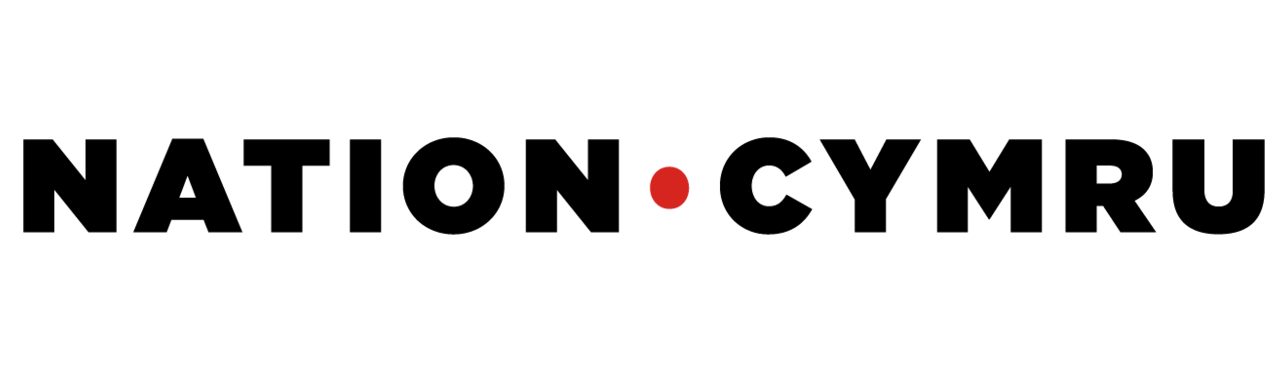

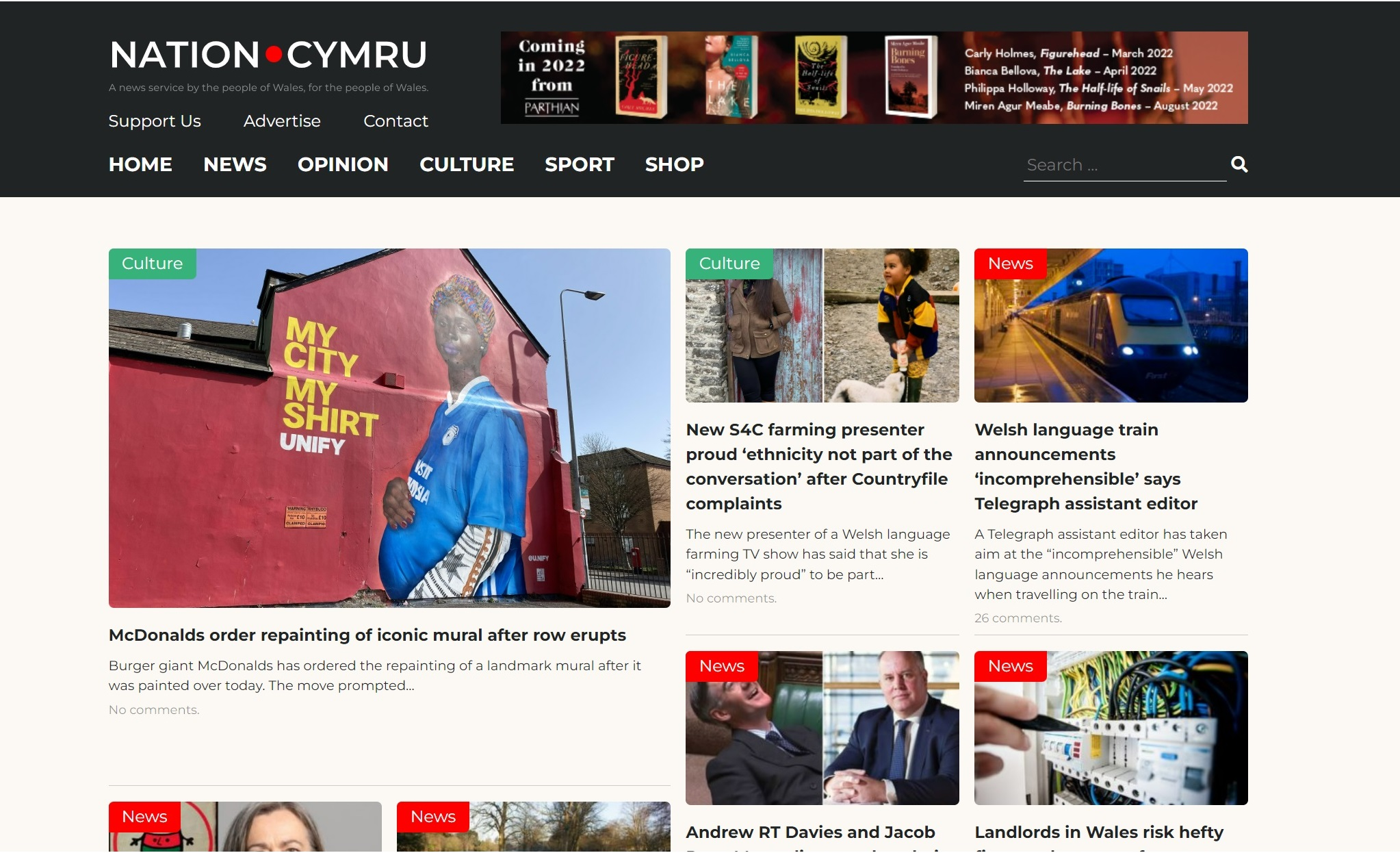
- Screenshot
- Company type: Private
- Website type: News service
- Headquarters: Wales
- Editor: Mark Mansfield
- CEO: Mark Mansfield
- Industry: News
- Website: nation.cymru
- Commercial: No
- Launched: 26 May 2017; 9 years ago
- Current status: Active

Nation.Cymru is a Welsh news service established in 2017 with the aim of creating a national English-language news service for Wales (Cymru). It receives £20,000 a year from the Books Council of Wales and the rest of its financial support comes from 1,000 monthly subscribers to the site.

== History ==
The website was established by Bangor University journalism lecturer Ifan Morgan Jones in response to the decline of the Welsh commercial media sector and lack of public knowledge of the activities of Welsh political institutions such as the Senedd. Jones was previously editor of the Golwg360 news website, as well as being a member of the Welsh Assembly's News and Digital Information Taskforce in 2017 and giving evidence to the Assembly's Culture, Welsh Language and Communications Committee.

In early 2017, the service established a crowdfunding round on GoFundMe, securing £5,305 in donations for the goal of "setting up a community-driven national news website, run and contributed to by volunteers, and with any money made invested back in the website.

Its first article published on 26 May 2017 said that the aim was to create a "national, popular, not for profit news service" that was independent of any other commercial organisation, therefore being "by the people of Wales, for the people of Wales".

The website aims to close the Welsh 'democratic deficit', specifically targeting the absence of a national, Welsh-based, English language news service. Welsh language readers are currently only served by Golwg360 and S4C ("preaching to the converted – the Welsh-speaking middle class" according to Jones), while English language readers are "underserved" by the BBC (headquartered in London) and the Western Mail (which only runs as a semi-national daily newspaper).

London School of Economics (LSE) researcher Samuel Parry cited the website when they attributed the "major stumbling block for Welsh independence" to the absence of an indigenous media in the country. Writing for the LSE Brexit blog, Parry cites the inception of Nation.Cymru and similar outlet Desolation Radio as seeking to stem that problem.

Academics such as McAllister and Cole have noted that "the weakness of the media has an effect on political coverage within Wales and on how informed the Welsh electorate are." Meanwhile, Blain, et al., have compared Wales' media deficit with the reach of the media in Scotland, where 12 newspapers are written and published in the country, and where there are 24 total papers some of whom are national newspapers with Scottish-made editions, but in reply Jones has asserted that "Wales is not Scotland".

The website states it is apolitical and will not support any particular candidate. It however rejects "the toxic politics of the far-right".

Supporters of the service include Plaid Cymru's UK parliamentary candidate, Mark Hooper, who says it serves as an opportunity for "Welsh news for Welsh readers".

In 2019 it received funding from the Books Council of Wales, who support similar publications such as Poetry Wales, the IWA's Click on Wales and The Welsh Agenda, the New Welsh Review, Planet, and the Wales Arts Review.

In February 2021 Ifan Morgan Jones stepped down as editor and Gareth Hughes took over the role. Later the same year David Owens was appointed as culture editor. In January 2023, Emily Price took over the role of news editor.

== Coverage ==
The site aims to provide frequent (but not 24/7) non commercial coverage of a range of subjects which tackle the "central question: how can we become a better nation?"

The website has been cited widely:

- On the floor of the Senedd during Plenary discussions into devolution of broadcasting
- In the Welsh Government's Draft Budget 2021
- In the Senedd Independent Review into the Arts
- In the Institute of Welsh Affairs (IWA) piece on Who Speaks for Wales?
- The IWA's report into Decarbonising Transport
- In pieces by Wales Online / Western Mail
- On the BBC News website
- On BBC Radio Cymru

=== Coverage in national media ===
The website has published a range of articles which have led to wider debate in other national media sources, some of which are covered below.

==== Iron Ring debate ====
Nation.Cymru drew attention in July 2017 when an article by Jones was featured by WalesOnline and the Western Mail, in which Jones criticises the £395,000 proposed iron ring sculpture at Flint Castle as being a tribute to "the fearsome castles built by Edward I in an enormous military and building effort to assert dominance over the uprising Welsh." 77% of respondents to a WalesOnline poll agreed with Jones' piece that the Iron Ring was a "symbol of oppression" rather than merely "a part of Welsh history". The sculpture was eventually put on hold by Cadw as a result of an intervention by the Welsh Government cabinet secretary for economy and infrastructure Ken Skates.

==== National Assembly salaries ====
The website led with a piece by political commentator and devolution advocate Daran Hill of Positif Politics, criticising the increasing average cost of National Assembly employees, citing a rise of £44,000 per employee and an increase of 90% between 2007 and 2017. The article was again picked up nationally by the Western Mail, and led to a response by a National Assembly spokeswoman, who said in part that "while the number of AMs has stayed the same their responsibilities have grown and the Commission has increased its staffing levels proportionately, to ensure that the support provided to AMs continues to adapt to meet the Assembly’s needs."

==== 2017 contribution to an Assembly Independent Review ====
In October 2017, the website was cited in the Senedd as part of the Welsh Government's Independent Review of Support for Publishing and Literature in Wales. The panel was investigating concerns regarding funding for the Arts Council of Wales after controversy regarding the review of Eric Ngalle's novel I, Eric Ngalle. In the Independent Review, the panel discussed Swansea University critic Jasmine Donahaye's piece on Nation arguing that the critical review of the novel by Jim Perrin in the Wales Arts Review was problematic for telling "us more about the reviewer than about the book under review" and that the Wales Arts Council funded bodies should "make room for different voices and experiences that are challenging to established values, and to establishment norms."

==== Neil McEvoy ====
The website contributed to the national discussion of Plaid Cymru AM Neil McEvoy's increased tensions with his party, including the investigation which saw him suspended from the Party as well as publishing opinion pieces from McEvoy's perspective.

A Nation article written by McEvoy was widely reported by the BBC. On the website, McEvoy argued in support for UKIP AM Gareth Bennett after the latter had been banned from speaking in the Assembly. Bennett's ban came after Assembly presiding officer Elin Jones describing his comments in the Senedd as "quite offensive" regarding transgender rights. McEvoy however said it highlighted the need for "diversity of thinking", which he felt was not present in the Assembly.

==== Second Severn Crossing naming controversy ====
The website contributed to discussion around the renaming of the Second Severn Crossing as the Prince of Wales Bridge when it commissioned a YouGov poll into support for the change. The website found twice as many people oppose renaming the bridge as support it, with a total of 34% in some way against the name change, and 17% in some way in favour. 47% had no strong feelings either way. Western Mail political Chief Reporter Martin Shipton picked up the poll in his column, and asked the Wales Office for comment, however the Secretary for State did not provide a response.

==== Institute of Welsh Affairs Decarbonising Transport report ====
An article written by North Wales AM Llŷr Huws Gruffydd was cited by the Institute of Welsh Affairs as part of a report into Decarbonising Transport, providing "a more contemporary, and political view of bus deregulation in North Wales".

==== 'Radioactive' mud dumping scandal ====
The website was cited nationally when it ran successive articles in August 2018 on the issue of "300,000 tonnes of mud" which was proposed to be dumped onto the River Severn, by EDF Energy from its Hinkley Point nuclear power plant. The article, entitled "What you can do to stop the dumping", was written by Neil McEvoy AM and was critical of Natural Resources Wales for taking only "five samples of mud taken from below 5cm back in 2009", as well as the agency's subsequent decision to then destroy those samples. McEvoy however praised the likes of Super Furry Animals keyboardist Cian Ciaran for their activist work. The views expressed in the article were re-published in the South Wales Argus and other newspapers.

==== Vaughan Gething resignation ====
The website played a notional role in the resignation of the First Minister of Wales, Vaughan Gething. During the Welsh Labour leadership campaign Nation.Cymru revealed that Vaughan Gething's campaign had received a donation by a company run by a director who was given a suspended prison sentence for dumping waste at a conservation site. They subsequently revealed that companies run by the same man, David Neal, owed £400,000 to a bank wholly owned by the Welsh Government. In May the website published leaked messages suggesting that Vaughan Gething had deleted records of conversations he had with other ministers, which led to the firing of Minister for Social Partnership Hannah Blythyn. Nation.Cymru confirmed on 11 July 2024 that, contrary to Gething's allegations, Blythyn was not the source. The twin political scandals were cited by the BBC as reasons behind Vaughan Gething's decision to resign in July 2024.

== See also ==
- Media of Wales
- Politics of Wales
