= Dan Thomas =

British politician (born c. 1981)

Dan Thomas MS
- Official portrait, 2026

Leader of the Opposition in Wales
- In office 12 May 2026 – 15 September 2026
- Monarch: Charles III
- First Minister: Rhun ap Iorwerth
- Deputy: Helen Jenner
- Preceded by: Darren Millar (Note: Office vacant between 20 January and 12 May 2026.)
- Succeeded by: Helen Jenner

Leader of Reform Wales
- In office 5 February 2026 – 15 September 2026
- Deputy: Helen Jenner
- UK party leader: Nigel Farage
- Preceded by: Nathan Gill (Note: Office vacant between 8 May 2021 and 5 February 2026)
- Succeeded by: Helen Jenner

Member of the Senedd
- Incumbent
- Assumed office 8 May 2026
- Constituency: Casnewydd Islwyn
Local government offices
Leader of Barnet London Borough Council
In office 21 May 2019 – 5 May 2022
Preceded by	Richard Cornelius
Succeeded by	Barry Rawlings
Member of Barnet London Borough Council
In office 4 May 2006 – 31 December 2025
Ward	Finchley Church End

Personal details
- Born: Daniel Thomas c. 1981 (age 44–45) South Wales Valleys, Wales
- Party: Reform Wales (since 2025)
- Other political affiliations: Conservative (until 2025)
- Children: 2
- Education: Coleg Gwent

Daniel Thomas (born c. 1981) is a British politician who served as Leader of the Opposition in Wales from May to September 2026, and Leader of Reform UK Wales from February to September 2026. He has served as a member of the Senedd (MS) for Casnewydd Islwyn since May 2026. A former member of the Conservative Party, Thomas was the leader of Barnet London Borough Council from 2019 to 2022, representing Finchley Church End from 2006 to 2025.

== Early life and career ==
Thomas was born and raised in the Welsh valleys, originally coming from Blackwood, Caerphilly. He studied for A-levels at the Coleg Gwent campus in Crosskeys. He said he left Wales in 1999 at the age of 18 due to a "lack of opportunities". He said he has a background in "financial services, retail banking".

== Political career ==
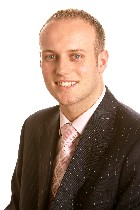
Thomas as a councillor

Thomas served as a Conservative Party councillor on Barnet London Borough Council from 2006 to 2025, serving as leader of the council from 2019 to 2022, and as leader of the opposition Conservative group on the council following 2022.

In the 2010 and 2017 general elections, he was the Conservative parliamentary candidate for Islwyn, coming second both times.

In the 2016 London Assembly election, he stood as the Conservative candidate for Barnet and Camden.

In 2018 while Dan Thomas was deputy council leader of Barnet, he and the council leader faced calls to resign from the leader of the Labour group on the council, after it came to light that a council worker, who was sentenced to 5 years in prison, had stolen £2 million by fraud from the council while working with Capita between 2016 and 2017.

Following the birth of his son in summer 2024, he moved away from Barnet and announced he would be standing down from the council in the following year.

Dan Thomas defected to Reform UK in June 2025, stating: "I joined Reform because of their unwavering commitment to defending British culture, identity, and values." He later resigned from the council on 31 December 2025, leaving a vacant seat heading into the 2026 election; the timing of the resignation meant a by-election was avoided.

=== Leader of Reform Wales (2026) ===
Thomas was announced as Leader of Reform Wales on 5 February 2026. In that announcement, British Reform leader, Nigel Farage, said: "He has voluntarily left London, come back to the Valleys, living in Islwyn, come back to his home, and he's done that because he loves Wales." However, Nation.Cymru reported that a source told it that Thomas had actually moved to Bath. Following speculation in the media about where Thomas lived, British Reform said: "Dan lives in Wales. Any claim to the contrary is entirely false. He lives here in Wales, where he is raising his young family". They also confirmed that he owns a property portfolio, which included a property in Bath that is rented out and not his main residence. ITV Wales confirmed they had seen proof that Dan Thomas was added to the electoral roll in the Caerphilly borough area in July 2025. A British Reform spokesperson said: "Dan is on the electoral roll here in Wales".

Following a series of controversies relating to the party's selections, Thomas appointed Helen Jenner as the party's deputy leader.

=== Leader of the Opposition (2026) ===
Thomas in the Senedd in 2026

In the 2026 Senedd election he was elected and became Leader of the Opposition. He appointed the Thomas shadow cabinet.

In May 2026, Corey Edwards was appointed as an adviser to Thomas. Plaid Cymru and Labour criticised the appointment due to an incident where he appeared to do a Nazi salute.

On 15 September 2026, Thomas announced his resignation as leader of Reform UK Wales after false allegations led to his arrest on suspicion of assault and controlling or coercive behaviour. Helen Jenner as deputy became acting leader. Gwent Police said that Thomas had been released on bail pending further enquiries; Thomas said he had been "released without charge" and had "done nothing wrong". He said he would continue to serve as a Member of the Senedd for the Casnewydd Islwyn constituency. On 17 November 2026 the police dropped the investigation saying no further action will be taken. Thomas said he had been vindicated.

== Personal life ==
Thomas has a wife and two young sons. The family moved from Barnet in 2024 so that Thomas and his wife could raise their young sons in the countryside, and live closer to their families in South Wales.

== Elections contested ==
=== Senedd elections ===
Year	Constituency	Party	Votes	% votes	Result	Ref.
2026	Casnewydd Islwyn	Reform	25,571	32.9	Elected	

=== Barnet London Borough Council elections ===
Year	Ward	Party	Votes	% votes	Result	Ref.
2006	Finchley Church End	Conservative	2,402	58.5	Elected	
2010	Finchley Church End	Conservative	3,403	48.0	Elected	
2014	Finchley Church End	Conservative	2,197	48.2	Elected	
2018	Finchley Church End	Conservative	3,050	57.8	Elected	
2022	Finchley Church End	Conservative	2,140	40.6	Elected	

=== UK general elections ===
Year	Constituency	Party	Votes	% votes	Result	Ref.
2010	Islwyn	Conservative	4,854	14.0	2nd of 8	
2017	Islwyn	Conservative	9,826	27.2	2nd of 5	

=== London Assembly elections ===
Year	Constituency	Party	Votes	% votes	Result	Ref.
2016	Barnet and Camden	Conservative	65,242	35.5	2nd of 5	

== See also ==
- 7th Senedd
- List of Reform UK politicians
- List of Conservative Party defections to Reform UK

== Notes ==
Party political offices
Vacant Title last held by Nathan Gill	Leader of Reform UK Wales; 2026	Succeeded by Helen Jenner
Senedd
Preceded by Constituency created	Member of the Senedd for Casnewydd Islwyn; 2026–present	Incumbent
Political offices
Preceded by Darren Millar	Leader of the Opposition in Wales; 2026	Succeeded by Helen Jenner
