= 2026 Senedd election =

General election held in Wales on 7 May 2026

- 7 May 2026

All 96 seats to the Senedd 49 seats needed for a majority
- Opinion polls
- Registered: 2,433,921
- Turnout: 51.6% (▲5.0 pp)

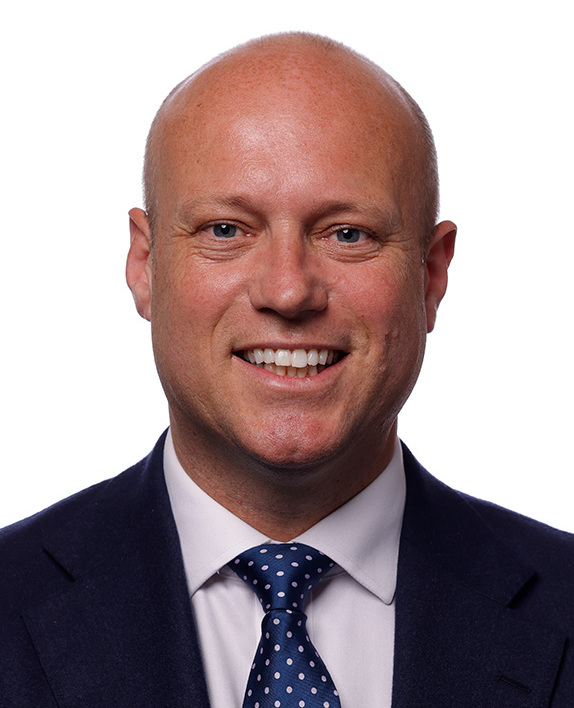

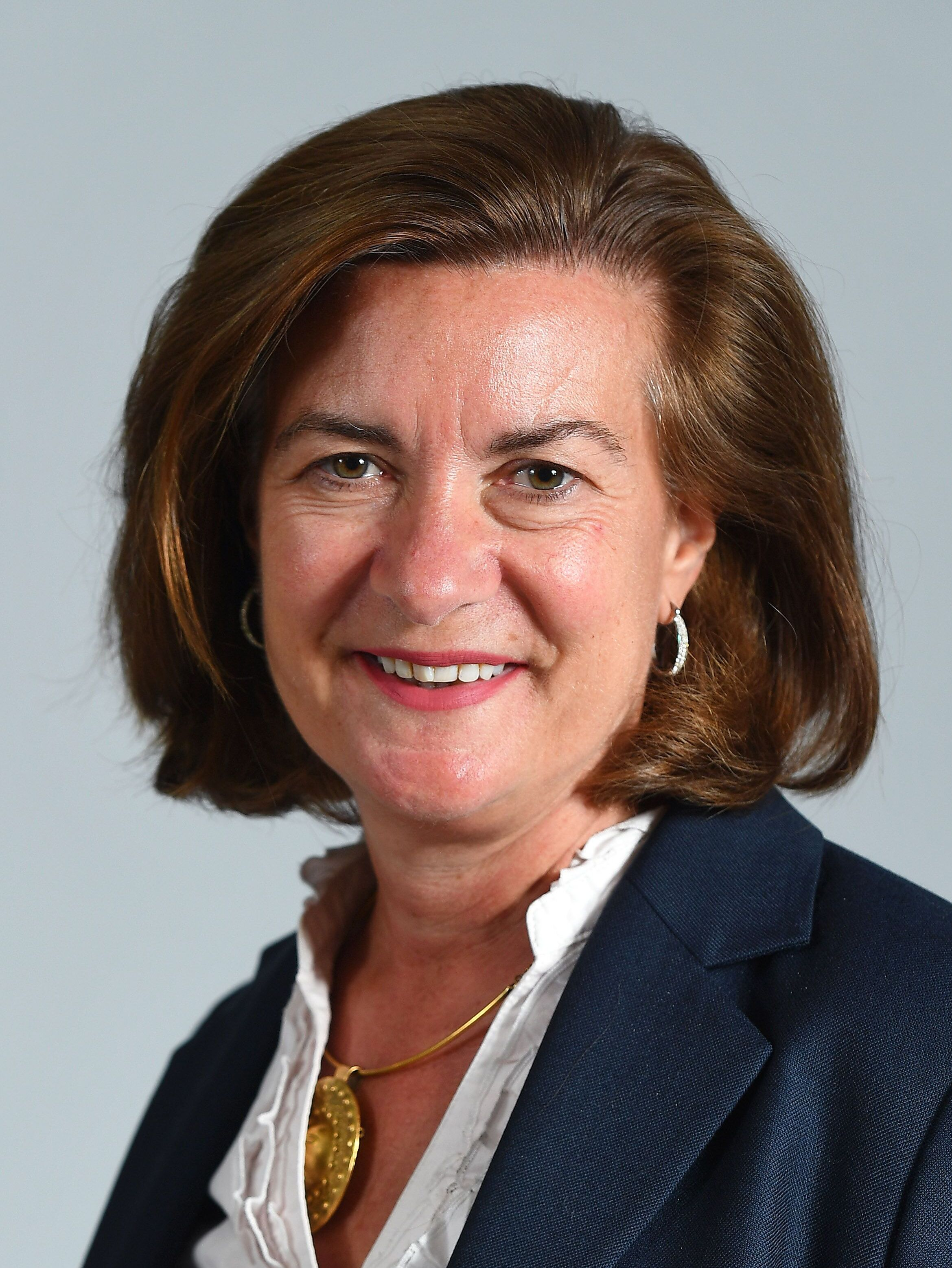

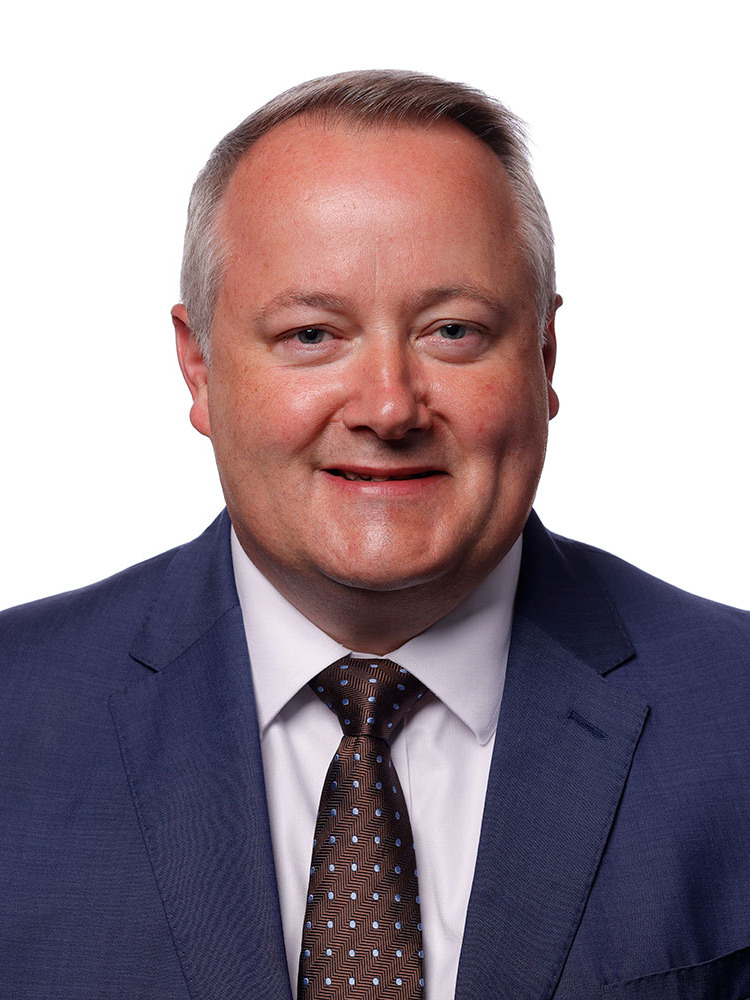

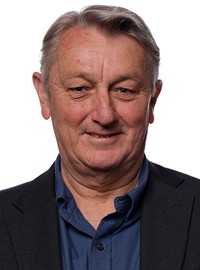

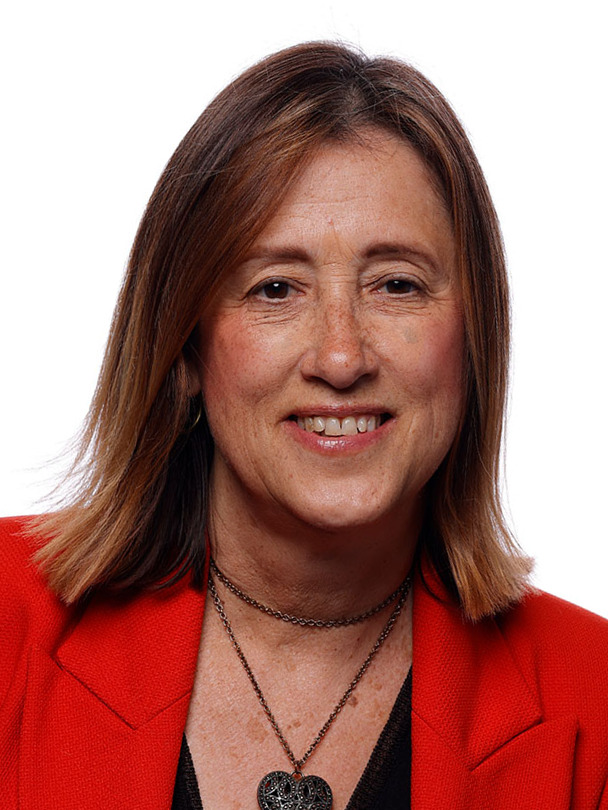
| | First party | Second party | Third party |
|---|---|---|---|
| Leader | Rhun ap Iorwerth | Dan Thomas | Eluned Morgan |
| Party | Plaid Cymru | Reform | Labour |
| Leader since | 16 June 2023 | 5 February 2026 | 24 July 2024 |
| Leader's seat | Bangor Conwy Môn (Note: Represented Ynys Môn prior to dissolution. Bangor Conwy Môn was the primary successor constituency under the new boundaries, which ap Iorwerth contested and won at this election.) | Casnewydd Islwyn (Note: Not an incumbent but stood for this constituency and won.) | Ceredigion Penfro (defeated) (Note: Represented Mid and West Wales prior to dissolution. Ceredigion Penfro was one of five new constituencies under new boundaries, which Morgan contested at this election and lost.) |
| Last election | 13 seats, 20.7% | 0 seats, 1.1% | 30 (Note: Includes 16 MSs sponsored by the Co-operative Party, who are designated Labour and Co-operative.) seats, 36.2% |
| Seats before | 13 (Note: Rhys ab Owen was later suspended from the party, sitting as an independent. In October 2025, Lindsay Whittle was elected in the 2025 Caerphilly by-election.) | 2 | 29 |
| Seats won | 43 | 34 | 9 (Note: Includes 5 MSs sponsored by the Co-operative Party, who are designated Labour and Co-operative.) |
| Seat change | ▲30 | ▲34 | ▼21 |
| Popular vote | 444,665 | 367,985 | 139,203 |
| Percentage | 35.4% | 29.3% | 11.1% |
| Swing | ▲14.7 pp | ▲28.2 pp | ▼25.1 pp |
| | Fourth party | Fifth party | Sixth party |
| Leader | Darren Millar | Anthony Slaughter | Jane Dodds |
| Party | Conservative | Green | Liberal Democrats |
| Leader since | 5 December 2024 | 21 December 2018 | 3 November 2017 |
| Leader's seat | Clwyd (Note: Represented Clwyd West prior to dissolution. Clwyd was the primary successor constituency under the new boundaries, which Millar contested and won at this election.) | Caerdydd Penarth (Note: Not an incumbent but stood for this constituency and won.) | Brycheiniog Tawe Nedd (Note: Represented Mid and West Wales prior to dissolution. Brycheiniog Tawe Nedd was one of five new constituencies under new boundaries, which Dodds contested and won at this election.) |
| Last election | 16 seats, 25.1% | 0 seats, 4.4% | 1 seat, 4.3% |
| Seats before | 13 | 0 | 1 |
| Seats won | 7 | 2 | 1 |
| Seat change | ▼9 | ▲2 | Steady |
| Popular vote | 134,926 | 84,608 | 56,012 |
| Percentage | 10.7% | 6.7% | 4.5% |
| Swing | ▼14.4 pp | ▲2.3 pp | ▲0.2 pp |
- Results election map
First Minister before election
Eluned Morgan
Labour
First Minister after election
Rhun ap Iorwerth
Plaid Cymru

An election for the Senedd (Welsh Parliament; Welsh: Senedd Cymru) was held on 7 May 2026, to elect all 96 members to the Senedd. It was the seventh devolved general election since the Senedd (formerly the National Assembly for Wales) was established in 1999. It was the first election following numerous reforms: an increase in the size of the Senedd from 60 members to 96, the adoption of party-list proportional representation, the reduction of the number of constituencies to sixteen, and the shortening of its term from five years to four.

Welsh Labour lost government and its status as the largest party for the first time since devolution began in 1999, ending a winning streak that had lasted since the 1922 United Kingdom general election and representing a historic realignment of Welsh politics. Plaid Cymru emerged as the largest party for the first time with 43 seats by making massive breakthroughs in traditional southern Labour heartlands, while Reform UK secured second place with 34 seats. Labour was reduced to third place with a historic low of 9 seats. The Welsh Conservatives and the Wales Green Party won 7 and 2 seats respectively, with the Greens entering the Senedd for the first time. With her failure to secure a seat in the constituency of Ceredigion Penfro, First Minister Eluned Morgan became the first leader of a government in the UK to lose their seat while in office. Turnout was 51.72%, the highest ever for a Welsh devolved election.

The election was held on the same day as local elections in England, the Scottish Parliament election, in which the Scottish National Party were victorious. With Sinn Féin also in government in Northern Ireland, this would mark the first time that all three devolved nations were governed by first ministers seeking separation or independence from the United Kingdom.

== Background ==
In the 2021 Senedd election, Welsh Labour won another government with one seat short of a majority. Shortly after, they entered a co-operation agreement with Plaid Cymru, which fell short of a typical coalition or confidence and supply agreement but represented some degree of policy collaboration. At the 2022 Welsh local elections, the Welsh Conservatives suffered losses to Plaid Cymru and Labour.

In December 2023, Mark Drakeford announced he would stand down as First Minister, following the election of his successor. The ensuing Welsh Labour leadership election was won narrowly by Vaughan Gething. The Gething government lasted only until July 2024 due to two distinct scandals relating to allegations of cronyism and allegations that Gething had lied about deleting text messages relating to the COVID-19 pandemic. During this time, Plaid Cymru left the co-operation agreement.

In the midst of this, at the 2024 United Kingdom general election in Wales, Labour won the most seats and the Conservatives were wiped out: losing all their Welsh seats. Later in July, Gething announced he would stand down after a process to select his successor. The following July 2024 Welsh Labour leadership election was uncontested, with Eluned Morgan being elected.

At the UK-wide level, a number of other factors influenced the election, including various issues relating to the Starmer ministry and the ongoing United Kingdom cost-of-living crisis.

In October 2025, Plaid Cymru won the Caerphilly by-election from Labour, who had held the seat since the Senedd's inception in 1999 and its Westminister counterpart since the seat's creation in 1918.

Since the middle of the Gething Government, and continuing through successive events, Welsh Labour's polling performance had declined. Welsh Labour had previously been the most successful political party in the democratic era, having the longest winning streak of any political party. The 2026 vote is correspondingly considered to be seismic for Welsh politics and was touted as the "most consequential Senedd election since 1999". It has also attracted "unprecedented" interest internationally in Welsh politics, primarily from other European nations. Polls suggested a close race between Plaid Cymru and Reform UK.

The 2026 Senedd election was the first to feature an online elections information platform, vote.wales, managed by the Electoral Management Board for Wales, part of the Democracy and Boundary Commission Cymru.

== Electoral system ==
The 2026 Senedd election used a new electoral system following the approval of the Senedd Reform Act. Following conclusion of the count, the Senedd has 96 members, all elected through closed list proportional representation (using the D'Hondt method) in sixteen six-member constituencies. The 16 constituencies were created by pairing up the 32 Welsh Westminster constituencies. Parties nominated up to 8 candidates on their list in each constituency.

Voters were given one ballot, rather than two previously, and voted for one political party (or an independent candidate), rather than individual people, resulting in voters being unable to vote for a specific individual candidate. The available seats will then be distributed proportionally to the parties based on how many votes they received, electing the candidates in the order on their ranked party list. The single ballot paper showed the list of (up to) eight candidates next to each party in order, therefore showing all the candidates in a constituency on the ballot paper.

In the event that an elected Senedd member resigns, dies, or otherwise leaves office during the term, they will be replaced by the member below them on their party's list rather than a by-election being held. Should the relevant party's list for that constituency be exhausted, the seat will remain vacant for the remainder of the term.

In all prior elections since its establishment as the Welsh Assembly in 1999, the Senedd has been elected through the additional member system, and had 60 members, under which 40 out of 60 seats were elected by the first past the post system from single-member constituencies (the same as those used for Westminster), while the remaining 20 were attributed regionally (in 5 regions of 4 seats) on the basis of a second vote for a closed party list of candidates. The additional member seats in each region were allocated from the lists by the D'Hondt method, with constituency results being taken into account in the allocation. The new electoral system was used only for elections held after 6 April 2026, to allow time for the new constituencies to be drawn up.

Another proposed reform bill would have provided for mandatory "zipping" of male and female candidates in the list to ensure that for every party, half of the Members would be women; however, this bill was scrapped in September 2024.

=== Constituencies ===
Map of the 16 constituencies to be used for the election (Note: Labelled using their sole Welsh names, with Caerdydd being the Welsh name for Cardiff)

- Afan Ogwr Rhondda
- Bangor Conwy Môn
- Blaenau Gwent Caerffili Rhymni
- Brycheiniog Tawe Nedd
- Caerdydd Ffynnon Taf
- Caerdydd Penarth
- Casnewydd Islwyn
- Ceredigion Penfro
- Clwyd
- Fflint Wrecsam
- Gwynedd Maldwyn
- Gŵyr Abertawe
- Pen-y-bont Bro Morgannwg
- Pontypridd Cynon Merthyr
- Sir Fynwy Torfaen
- Sir Gaerfyrddin

== Incumbent Senedd members ==
MSs who retired are in italics. MSs who were reelected are in bold.

| Outgoing members | | | | 2026 Senedd election | |
| Old constituency | Member | Old region | Members | New constituency | Incumbents running |
|---|---|---|---|---|---|
| Aberconwy | Janet Finch-Saunders (Con) | North Wales | Carolyn Thomas (Lab) Mark Isherwood (Con) Sam Rowlands (Con) Llyr Gruffydd (Plaid) | Bangor Conwy Môn | Rhun ap Iorwerth (Plaid, #1) Janet Finch-Saunders (Con, #1) |
| Ynys Môn | Rhun ap Iorwerth (Plaid) | North Wales | Carolyn Thomas (Lab) Mark Isherwood (Con) Sam Rowlands (Con) Llyr Gruffydd (Plaid) | Bangor Conwy Môn | Rhun ap Iorwerth (Plaid, #1) Janet Finch-Saunders (Con, #1) |
| Clwyd West | Darren Millar (Con) | North Wales | Carolyn Thomas (Lab) Mark Isherwood (Con) Sam Rowlands (Con) Llyr Gruffydd (Plaid) | Clwyd | Llyr Gruffydd (Plaid, #1) Hannah Blythyn (Lab, #1) Carolyn Thomas (Lab, #2) Darren Millar (Con, #1) Gareth Davies (Con, #2) |
| Delyn | Hannah Blythyn (Lab) | North Wales | Carolyn Thomas (Lab) Mark Isherwood (Con) Sam Rowlands (Con) Llyr Gruffydd (Plaid) | Clwyd | Llyr Gruffydd (Plaid, #1) Hannah Blythyn (Lab, #1) Carolyn Thomas (Lab, #2) Darren Millar (Con, #1) Gareth Davies (Con, #2) |
| Vale of Clwyd | Gareth Davies (Con) | North Wales | Carolyn Thomas (Lab) Mark Isherwood (Con) Sam Rowlands (Con) Llyr Gruffydd (Plaid) | Clwyd | Llyr Gruffydd (Plaid, #1) Hannah Blythyn (Lab, #1) Carolyn Thomas (Lab, #2) Darren Millar (Con, #1) Gareth Davies (Con, #2) |
| Alyn and Deeside | Jack Sargeant (Lab) | North Wales | Carolyn Thomas (Lab) Mark Isherwood (Con) Sam Rowlands (Con) Llyr Gruffydd (Plaid) | Fflint Wrecsam | Ken Skates (Lab, #1) Jack Sargeant (Lab, #2) Sam Rowlands (Con, #1) |
| Wrexham | Lesley Griffiths (Lab) | North Wales | Carolyn Thomas (Lab) Mark Isherwood (Con) Sam Rowlands (Con) Llyr Gruffydd (Plaid) | Fflint Wrecsam | Ken Skates (Lab, #1) Jack Sargeant (Lab, #2) Sam Rowlands (Con, #1) |
| Clwyd South | Ken Skates (Lab) | North Wales | Carolyn Thomas (Lab) Mark Isherwood (Con) Sam Rowlands (Con) Llyr Gruffydd (Plaid) | Fflint Wrecsam | Ken Skates (Lab, #1) Jack Sargeant (Lab, #2) Sam Rowlands (Con, #1) |
| Arfon | Siân Gwenllian (Plaid) | North Wales | Carolyn Thomas (Lab) Mark Isherwood (Con) Sam Rowlands (Con) Llyr Gruffydd (Plaid) | Gwynedd Maldwyn | Siân Gwenllian (Plaid, #1) Mabon ap Gwynfor (Plaid, #2) Russell George (Ind) |
| Dwyfor Meirionnydd | Mabon ap Gwynfor (Plaid) | Mid and West Wales | Cefin Campbell (Plaid) Eluned Morgan (Lab) Joyce Watson (Lab) Jane Dodds (Lib Dem) | Gwynedd Maldwyn | Siân Gwenllian (Plaid, #1) Mabon ap Gwynfor (Plaid, #2) Russell George (Ind) |
| Montgomeryshire | Russell George (Ind) (Note: Russell George was elected as a Conservative MS, but was suspended from the party) | Mid and West Wales | Cefin Campbell (Plaid) Eluned Morgan (Lab) Joyce Watson (Lab) Jane Dodds (Lib Dem) | Gwynedd Maldwyn | Siân Gwenllian (Plaid, #1) Mabon ap Gwynfor (Plaid, #2) Russell George (Ind) |
| Carmarthen West and South Pembrokeshire | Samuel Kurtz (Con) | Mid and West Wales | Cefin Campbell (Plaid) Eluned Morgan (Lab) Joyce Watson (Lab) Jane Dodds (Lib Dem) | Ceredigion Penfro | Elin Jones (Plaid, #1) Eluned Morgan (Lab, #1) Paul Davies (Con, #1) Samuel Kurtz (Con, #2) |
| Ceredigion | Elin Jones (Plaid) | Mid and West Wales | Cefin Campbell (Plaid) Eluned Morgan (Lab) Joyce Watson (Lab) Jane Dodds (Lib Dem) | Ceredigion Penfro | Elin Jones (Plaid, #1) Eluned Morgan (Lab, #1) Paul Davies (Con, #1) Samuel Kurtz (Con, #2) |
| Preseli Pembrokeshire | Paul Davies (Con) | Mid and West Wales | Cefin Campbell (Plaid) Eluned Morgan (Lab) Joyce Watson (Lab) Jane Dodds (Lib Dem) | Ceredigion Penfro | Elin Jones (Plaid, #1) Eluned Morgan (Lab, #1) Paul Davies (Con, #1) Samuel Kurtz (Con, #2) |
| Carmarthen East and Dinefwr | Adam Price (Plaid) | Mid and West Wales | Cefin Campbell (Plaid) Eluned Morgan (Lab) Joyce Watson (Lab) Jane Dodds (Lib Dem) | Sir Gaerfyrddin | Cefin Campbell (Plaid, #1) Adam Price (Plaid, #3) |
| Llanelli | Lee Waters (Lab) | Mid and West Wales | Cefin Campbell (Plaid) Eluned Morgan (Lab) Joyce Watson (Lab) Jane Dodds (Lib Dem) | Sir Gaerfyrddin | Cefin Campbell (Plaid, #1) Adam Price (Plaid, #3) |
| Brecon and Radnorshire | James Evans (Ref) (Note: James Evans was elected as a Conservative MS, but was suspended from the party and joined Reform UK.) | Mid and West Wales | Cefin Campbell (Plaid) Eluned Morgan (Lab) Joyce Watson (Lab) Jane Dodds (Lib Dem) | Brycheiniog Tawe Nedd | Sioned Williams (Plaid, #1) James Evans (Ref, #1) Jane Dodds (Lib Dem, #1) |
| Neath | Jeremy Miles (Lab) | South Wales West | Tom Giffard (Con) Altaf Hussain (Con) Sioned Williams (Plaid) Luke Fletcher (Plaid) | Brycheiniog Tawe Nedd | Sioned Williams (Plaid, #1) James Evans (Ref, #1) Jane Dodds (Lib Dem, #1) |
| Gower | Rebecca Evans (Lab) | South Wales West | Tom Giffard (Con) Altaf Hussain (Con) Sioned Williams (Plaid) Luke Fletcher (Plaid) | Gŵyr Abertawe | Mike Hedges (Lab, #1) Tom Giffard (Con, #1) |
| Swansea East | Mike Hedges (Lab) | South Wales West | Tom Giffard (Con) Altaf Hussain (Con) Sioned Williams (Plaid) Luke Fletcher (Plaid) | Gŵyr Abertawe | Mike Hedges (Lab, #1) Tom Giffard (Con, #1) |
| Swansea West | Julie James (Lab) | South Wales West | Tom Giffard (Con) Altaf Hussain (Con) Sioned Williams (Plaid) Luke Fletcher (Plaid) | Gŵyr Abertawe | Mike Hedges (Lab, #1) Tom Giffard (Con, #1) |
| Aberavon | David Rees (Lab) | South Wales West | Tom Giffard (Con) Altaf Hussain (Con) Sioned Williams (Plaid) Luke Fletcher (Plaid) | Afan Ogwr Rhondda | Huw Irranca-Davies (Lab, #1) Buffy Williams (Lab, #2) David Rees (Lab, #3) |
| Ogmore | Huw Irranca-Davies (Lab) | South Wales West | Tom Giffard (Con) Altaf Hussain (Con) Sioned Williams (Plaid) Luke Fletcher (Plaid) | Afan Ogwr Rhondda | Huw Irranca-Davies (Lab, #1) Buffy Williams (Lab, #2) David Rees (Lab, #3) |
| Rhondda | Buffy Williams (Lab) | (South Wales Central) | | Afan Ogwr Rhondda | Huw Irranca-Davies (Lab, #1) Buffy Williams (Lab, #2) David Rees (Lab, #3) |
| Bridgend | Sarah Murphy (Lab) | (South Wales West) | | Pen-y-bont Bro Morgannwg | Sarah Murphy (Lab, #1) Andrew RT Davies (Con, #1) Luke Fletcher (Plaid, #3) |
| Vale of Glamorgan | Jane Hutt (Lab) | South Wales Central | Andrew RT Davies (Con) Joel James (Con) Rhys ab Owen (Ind) (Note: Rhys ab Owen was elected as a Plaid Cymru MS, but was suspended from the party) Heledd Fychan (Plaid) | Pen-y-bont Bro Morgannwg | Sarah Murphy (Lab, #1) Andrew RT Davies (Con, #1) Luke Fletcher (Plaid, #3) |
| Cardiff South and Penarth | Vaughan Gething (Lab) | South Wales Central | Andrew RT Davies (Con) Joel James (Con) Rhys ab Owen (Ind) Heledd Fychan (Plaid) | Caerdydd Penarth | Rhys ab Owen (Ind) |
| Cardiff West | Mark Drakeford (Lab) | South Wales Central | Andrew RT Davies (Con) Joel James (Con) Rhys ab Owen (Ind) Heledd Fychan (Plaid) | Caerdydd Penarth | Rhys ab Owen (Ind) |
| Cardiff Central | Jenny Rathbone (Lab) | South Wales Central | Andrew RT Davies (Con) Joel James (Con) Rhys ab Owen (Ind) Heledd Fychan (Plaid) | Caerdydd Ffynnon Taf | Joel James (Con, #1) |
| Cardiff North | Julie Morgan (Lab) | South Wales Central | Andrew RT Davies (Con) Joel James (Con) Rhys ab Owen (Ind) Heledd Fychan (Plaid) | Caerdydd Ffynnon Taf | Joel James (Con, #1) |
| Cynon Valley | Vikki Howells (Lab) | South Wales Central | Andrew RT Davies (Con) Joel James (Con) Rhys ab Owen (Ind) Heledd Fychan (Plaid) | Pontypridd Cynon Merthyr | Heledd Fychan (Plaid, #1) Vikki Howells (Lab, #1) |
| Pontypridd | Mick Antoniw (Lab) | South Wales Central | Andrew RT Davies (Con) Joel James (Con) Rhys ab Owen (Ind) Heledd Fychan (Plaid) | Pontypridd Cynon Merthyr | Heledd Fychan (Plaid, #1) Vikki Howells (Lab, #1) |
| Merthyr Tydfil and Rhymney | Dawn Bowden (Lab) | South Wales East | Laura Anne Jones (Ref) (Note: Laura Anne Jones was elected as a Conservative MS, but later defected to Reform UK) Natasha Asghar (Con) Peredur Owen Griffiths (Plaid) Delyth Jewell (Plaid) | Pontypridd Cynon Merthyr | Heledd Fychan (Plaid, #1) Vikki Howells (Lab, #1) |
| Blaenau Gwent | Alun Davies (Lab) | South Wales East | Laura Anne Jones (Ref) Natasha Asghar (Con) Peredur Owen Griffiths (Plaid) Delyth Jewell (Plaid) | Blaenau Gwent Caerffili Rhymni | Delyth Jewell (Plaid, #1) Lindsay Whittle (Plaid, #2) Alun Davies (Lab, #1) |
| Caerphilly | Lindsay Whittle (Plaid) (Note: Lindsay Whittle was elected in a by-election) | South Wales East | Laura Anne Jones (Ref) Natasha Asghar (Con) Peredur Owen Griffiths (Plaid) Delyth Jewell (Plaid) | Blaenau Gwent Caerffili Rhymni | Delyth Jewell (Plaid, #1) Lindsay Whittle (Plaid, #2) Alun Davies (Lab, #1) |
| Islwyn | Rhianon Passmore (Lab) | South Wales East | Laura Anne Jones (Ref) Natasha Asghar (Con) Peredur Owen Griffiths (Plaid) Delyth Jewell (Plaid) | Casnewydd Islwyn | Peredur Owen Griffiths (Plaid, #1) Jayne Bryant (Lab, #1) Rhianon Passmore (Lab, #2) Natasha Asghar (Con, #1) |
| Newport East | John Griffiths (Lab) | South Wales East | Laura Anne Jones (Ref) Natasha Asghar (Con) Peredur Owen Griffiths (Plaid) Delyth Jewell (Plaid) | Casnewydd Islwyn | Peredur Owen Griffiths (Plaid, #1) Jayne Bryant (Lab, #1) Rhianon Passmore (Lab, #2) Natasha Asghar (Con, #1) |
| Newport West | Jayne Bryant (Lab) | South Wales East | Laura Anne Jones (Ref) Natasha Asghar (Con) Peredur Owen Griffiths (Plaid) Delyth Jewell (Plaid) | Casnewydd Islwyn | Peredur Owen Griffiths (Plaid, #1) Jayne Bryant (Lab, #1) Rhianon Passmore (Lab, #2) Natasha Asghar (Con, #1) |
| Monmouth | Peter Fox (Con) | South Wales East | Laura Anne Jones (Ref) Natasha Asghar (Con) Peredur Owen Griffiths (Plaid) Delyth Jewell (Plaid) | Sir Fynwy Torfaen | Laura Anne Jones (Ref, #1) Lynne Neagle (Lab, #1) Peter Fox (Con, #1) |
| Torfaen | Lynne Neagle (Lab) | South Wales East | Laura Anne Jones (Ref) Natasha Asghar (Con) Peredur Owen Griffiths (Plaid) Delyth Jewell (Plaid) | Sir Fynwy Torfaen | Laura Anne Jones (Ref, #1) Lynne Neagle (Lab, #1) Peter Fox (Con, #1) |

== Parties and candidates ==
=== Contesting parties ===
Labour, Conservatives, Plaid Cymru, Reform UK, Liberal Democrats and the Green Party stood at least 6 candidates in all 16 constituencies. In some seats Labour, Conservatives and Plaid Cymru filed 7 or even 8 seats. Other parties stood in at least one constituencies were (with the number of constituencies stood in brackets): Heritage Party (16), Gwlad (6), Open Party (3), Propel (2), Britain's Communist Party (2), TUSC (2), Christian (1), Official Monster Raving Loony Party (1), Social Democratic Party (1) and the Socialist Labour Party (1). 30 independent candidates stood across 14 constituencies.

| Party | Leader | Ideology | Seats at dissolution |
|---|---|---|---|
| Labour Party (Note: Includes 16 MSs sponsored by the Co-operative Party, who are designated Labour and Co-operative.); Plaid Llafur | Eluned Morgan; MS for Mid and West Wales (until 7 April 2026) | Social democracy British unionism | 29 / 60 (48%) |
| Conservative Party; Ceidwadwyr Cymreig | Darren Millar; MS for Clwyd West (until 7 April 2026) | Conservatism; British unionism | 13 / 60 (22%) |
| Plaid Cymru | Rhun ap Iorwerth; MS for Ynys Môn (until 7 April 2026) | Social democracy Welsh independence | 13 / 60 (22%) |
| Reform UK | Dan Thomas; Not an MS (previous leader of Barnet Council) | Right-wing populism Hard Euroscepticism | 2 / 60 (3%) |
| Liberal Democrats; Democratiaid Rhyddfrydol Cymru | Jane Dodds; MS for Mid and West Wales (until 7 April 2026) | Liberalism; British unionism | 1 / 60 (2%) |
| Green Party; Plaid Werdd | Anthony Slaughter; Not an MS | Green politics Welsh independence | 0 / 60 (0%) |
| Communist Party of Britain; Plaid Gomiwnyddol Gymreig | Alex Gordon; Not an MS | Communism; Marxism-Leninism | 0 / 60 (0%) |
| Gwlad | Gwyn Wigley Evans; Not an MS | Welsh nationalism Welsh independence | 0 / 60 (0%) |
| Heritage Party | David Kurten; Not an MS | British nationalism Right-wing populism | 0 / 60 (0%) |
| Official Monster Raving Loony Party; Plaid Swyddogol yr Anghenfilaidd Ddihirod Gwallgof | Alan "Howling Laud" Hope; Not an MS | Political satire | 0 / 60 (0%) |
| Open Party | Richard Hadwin; Not an MS | | 0 / 60 (0%) |
| Propel | Neil McEvoy; Not an MS | Welsh nationalism Welsh independence | 0 / 60 (0%) |
| Social Democratic Party | William Clouston; Not an MS | Social democracy Left-conservatism | 0 / 60 (0%) |
| Socialist Labour Party; Plaid Lafur Sosialaidd | Jim McDaid; Not an MS | Socialism; Republicanism | 0 / 60 (0%) |
| Trade Unionist and Socialist Coalition | Dave Nellist; Not an MS | Socialism; Trotskyism | 0 / 60 (0%) |
| Welsh Christian Party; Plaid Gristnogol | Jeff Green; Not an MS | Christian right Social conservatism | 0 / 60 (0%) |
| Independents | —N/a | | 2 / 60 (3%) |
Source: BBC

=== Candidates and results ===
NB: MSs in office (i.e. incumbents) before the election who are seeking re-election are marked with "inc.". Elected members are in bold.

| Constituency | Order | Labour | Plaid Cymru | Conservative | Reform UK | Liberal Democrats | Green | Others and independents |
|---|---|---|---|---|---|---|---|---|
| Afan Ogwr Rhondda | 1 | **Huw Irranca-Davies (11,123)** (inc.) | **Sera Evans (24,538)** | Abigail Mainon (2,831) | **Benjamin McKenna (22,345)** | Dean Ronan (1,800) | Nigel Pugh (2,561) | Heritage: 1. Kimberley Isherwood; 2. Logan Jenkins; Captain Beany (Independent) |
| Afan Ogwr Rhondda | 2 | Buffy Williams (5,561.5) (inc.) | **Alun Cox (12,269)** | Peter Crocker-Jacques | **Steve Bayliss (11,172.5)** | Cen Phillips | Anna Tuhey | Heritage: 1. Kimberley Isherwood; 2. Logan Jenkins; Captain Beany (Independent) |
| Afan Ogwr Rhondda | 3 | David Rees (inc.) | **Elyn Stephens (8,179.33)** | Tony Kear | Darren James (7,448.33) | Gerald Francis | Stephanie Woodhouse | Heritage: 1. Kimberley Isherwood; 2. Logan Jenkins; Captain Beany (Independent) |
| Afan Ogwr Rhondda | 4 | Stephanie Grimshaw | Danny Grehan (6,134.5) | William Martin | Louise Musgrave | Helen Thomas | David Wade | Heritage: 1. Kimberley Isherwood; 2. Logan Jenkins; Captain Beany (Independent) |
| Afan Ogwr Rhondda | 5 | Lisa Pritchard | Luned-Mair Barratt | Rachael Astle | Catrin Thomas | Jim Hehir | Abby-lee Rees | Heritage: 1. Kimberley Isherwood; 2. Logan Jenkins; Captain Beany (Independent) |
| Afan Ogwr Rhondda | 6 | Elaine Winstanley | Wendy Allsopp | Barbara Jones | Zakery Weaver | James McGettrick | Ellis Thomas | Heritage: 1. Kimberley Isherwood; 2. Logan Jenkins; Captain Beany (Independent) |
| Afan Ogwr Rhondda | 7 | Dilwar Ali | | | | | | Heritage: 1. Kimberley Isherwood; 2. Logan Jenkins; Captain Beany (Independent) |
| Afan Ogwr Rhondda | 8 | Tamasree Mukhopadhyay | | | | | | Heritage: 1. Kimberley Isherwood; 2. Logan Jenkins; Captain Beany (Independent) |
| Bangor Conwy Môn | 1 | Joanna Stallard (4,448) | **Rhun ap Iorwerth (31,057)** (inc.) | **Janet Finch-Saunders (8,555)** (inc.) | **Helen Jenner (19,440)** | Leena Farhat (1,591) | Tomos Barlow (3,101) | Mark Edward (Heritage); Jaime Fitter (Communist); Kathrine Jones (Socialist Labour Party); Sir Grumpus L Shorticus (OMRLP) |
| Bangor Conwy Môn | 2 | Emily Owen | **Mair Rowlands (15,528.5)** | Harry Saville (4,277.5) | **John Clark (9,720)** | David McBride | Linda Rogers | Mark Edward (Heritage); Jaime Fitter (Communist); Kathrine Jones (Socialist Labour Party); Sir Grumpus L Shorticus (OMRLP) |
| Bangor Conwy Môn | 3 | Margaret Lewis | **Elfed Williams (10,352.33)** | Martin Peet | Richard John Jones (6,480) | Mark Rosenthal | Nick Bounds | Mark Edward (Heritage); Jaime Fitter (Communist); Kathrine Jones (Socialist Labour Party); Sir Grumpus L Shorticus (OMRLP) |
| Bangor Conwy Môn | 4 | Rebecca Gibbons | Dyfed Jones (7,764.25) | Samantha Cotton | Andrew Winston-Jones | Rob Atendstaedt | Francis Cookson | Mark Edward (Heritage); Jaime Fitter (Communist); Kathrine Jones (Socialist Labour Party); Sir Grumpus L Shorticus (OMRLP) |
| Bangor Conwy Môn | 5 | Huw Vaughan Jones | Nia Clwyd Owen | David Ashworth | Craig Jones | Sarah Jackson | Vanessa Hall | Mark Edward (Heritage); Jaime Fitter (Communist); Kathrine Jones (Socialist Labour Party); Sir Grumpus L Shorticus (OMRLP) |
| Bangor Conwy Môn | 6 | Natasha Jose | Vivek Thuppil | Lucy Samuel | Dafydd Wyn Thomas | Preben Vangberg | David Bunker | Mark Edward (Heritage); Jaime Fitter (Communist); Kathrine Jones (Socialist Labour Party); Sir Grumpus L Shorticus (OMRLP) |
| Bangor Conwy Môn | 7 | | Lisa Elfyn Butler | | | | | Mark Edward (Heritage); Jaime Fitter (Communist); Kathrine Jones (Socialist Labour Party); Sir Grumpus L Shorticus (OMRLP) |
| Bangor Conwy Môn | 8 | | Beca Roberts | | | | | Mark Edward (Heritage); Jaime Fitter (Communist); Kathrine Jones (Socialist Labour Party); Sir Grumpus L Shorticus (OMRLP) |
| Blaenau Gwent; Caerffili Rhymni | 1 | Alun Davies (7,739) (inc.) | **Delyth Jewell (29,314)** (inc.) | Gareth Potter (3,353) | **Llŷr Powell (23,955)** | Steve Aicheler (1,284) | Anne Baker (2,447) | Mike Whatley (Independent); Jared Burgess (Heritage); Jordan Brace (Independent); Karen Horan (Open Party); Steve Wright (Independent) |
| Blaenau Gwent; Caerffili Rhymni | 2 | Richard Tunnicliffe | **Lindsay Whittle (14,657)** (inc.) | Janet Butler | **Catherine Cullen (11,977.5)** | David Scullin | Alexis Celnik | Mike Whatley (Independent); Jared Burgess (Heritage); Jordan Brace (Independent); Karen Horan (Open Party); Steve Wright (Independent) |
| Blaenau Gwent; Caerffili Rhymni | 3 | Keiran Russell | **Niamh Salkeld (9,771.33)** | John Child | **Joshua Kim (7,985)** | Catherine Dowden-King | Rachel Roberts | Mike Whatley (Independent); Jared Burgess (Heritage); Jordan Brace (Independent); Karen Horan (Open Party); Steve Wright (Independent) |
| Blaenau Gwent; Caerffili Rhymni | 4 | Sara Beard | Catrin Moss (7,328.5) | David West | Jonathan Parker (5,988.75) | Steve Lloyd | Hannah Garcia | Mike Whatley (Independent); Jared Burgess (Heritage); Jordan Brace (Independent); Karen Horan (Open Party); Steve Wright (Independent) |
| Blaenau Gwent; Caerffili Rhymni | 5 | Simon Dancey | Charlotte Bishop | Martin Newell | Glenda Marie Davies | Ivan Westley | Aidan Dempsey | Mike Whatley (Independent); Jared Burgess (Heritage); Jordan Brace (Independent); Karen Horan (Open Party); Steve Wright (Independent) |
| Blaenau Gwent; Caerffili Rhymni | 6 | John Pettit | Steven Skivens | Fay Rossini-Bromfield | Barclay Nickels | Juliet Price | Jamie Payne | Mike Whatley (Independent); Jared Burgess (Heritage); Jordan Brace (Independent); Karen Horan (Open Party); Steve Wright (Independent) |
| Blaenau Gwent; Caerffili Rhymni | 7 | Hero Marsden | | | | | | Mike Whatley (Independent); Jared Burgess (Heritage); Jordan Brace (Independent); Karen Horan (Open Party); Steve Wright (Independent) |
| Blaenau Gwent; Caerffili Rhymni | 8 | | | | | | | Mike Whatley (Independent); Jared Burgess (Heritage); Jordan Brace (Independent); Karen Horan (Open Party); Steve Wright (Independent) |
| Brycheiniog Tawe; Nedd | 1 | Mahaboob Basha (7,086) | **Sioned Williams (23,276)** (inc.) | Tyler Chambers (6,821) | **James Evans (26,897)** (inc.) | **Jane Dodds (9,549)** (inc.) | Nathan Goldup-John (5,405) | Welsh Christian Party: 1. Jeff Green; 2. Sue Green; Philip Owen (Gwlad); Jennifer Roberts (Heritage); Beverley Baynham (Independent); Joe Hale (Independent); Dai Richards (Independent) (Note: was a member of Restore Britain on registration of candidacy date. Also has previously been a member of Heritage Party, Advance UK and Reform UK) |
| Brycheiniog Tawe; Nedd | 2 | Alex Sims | **Rebeca Phillips (11,638)** | Elizabeth Hill-O'Shea | **Iain McIntosh (13,448.5)** | Jackie Charlton (4,774.5) | Charlotte Ajomale-Evans | Welsh Christian Party: 1. Jeff Green; 2. Sue Green; Philip Owen (Gwlad); Jennifer Roberts (Heritage); Beverley Baynham (Independent); Joe Hale (Independent); Dai Richards (Independent) |
| Brycheiniog Tawe; Nedd | 3 | Sarah Thomas | Andrew Jenkins (7,758.67) | Jane Lyons | **David Mills (8,965.67)** | Phoebe Jenkins | Ami Dhaliwal | Welsh Christian Party: 1. Jeff Green; 2. Sue Green; Philip Owen (Gwlad); Jennifer Roberts (Heritage); Beverley Baynham (Independent); Joe Hale (Independent); Dai Richards (Independent) |
| Brycheiniog Tawe; Nedd | 4 | Elliot Wigfall | Justin Horrell | Matthew Gilbert | Stephanie Moira Charles (6,724.25) | Will Lloyd | Eric Rosoman Matthews | Welsh Christian Party: 1. Jeff Green; 2. Sue Green; Philip Owen (Gwlad); Jennifer Roberts (Heritage); Beverley Baynham (Independent); Joe Hale (Independent); Dai Richards (Independent) |
| Brycheiniog Tawe; Nedd | 5 | Cyriac George | Kate Heneghan | Hannah Jarvis | Dewi Thomas | Peter Chapman | Kathy Oakwood | Welsh Christian Party: 1. Jeff Green; 2. Sue Green; Philip Owen (Gwlad); Jennifer Roberts (Heritage); Beverley Baynham (Independent); Joe Hale (Independent); Dai Richards (Independent) |
| Brycheiniog Tawe; Nedd | 6 | Chelsea Edwards | Chris Williams | Amanda Davies | Celfyn Furlong | Dylan Calved | Imogen da Silva | Welsh Christian Party: 1. Jeff Green; 2. Sue Green; Philip Owen (Gwlad); Jennifer Roberts (Heritage); Beverley Baynham (Independent); Joe Hale (Independent); Dai Richards (Independent) |
| Brycheiniog Tawe; Nedd | 7 | Morgan Pritchard | | | | | | Welsh Christian Party: 1. Jeff Green; 2. Sue Green; Philip Owen (Gwlad); Jennifer Roberts (Heritage); Beverley Baynham (Independent); Joe Hale (Independent); Dai Richards (Independent) |
| Brycheiniog Tawe; Nedd | 8 | | | | | | | Welsh Christian Party: 1. Jeff Green; 2. Sue Green; Philip Owen (Gwlad); Jennifer Roberts (Heritage); Beverley Baynham (Independent); Joe Hale (Independent); Dai Richards (Independent) |
| Caerdydd Ffynnon; Taf | 1 | **Shav Taj (11,261)** | **Dafydd Trystan (32,617)** | Joel James (8,479) (inc.) | **Cai Parry-Jones (17,335)** | Rodney Berman (8,442) | **Paul Rock (9,036)** | Propel: 1. Keith Parry; 2. Roy Leyshon; Welsh TUSC: 1. John Aaron Williams; 2. Helen Perriam; 3. David Bartlett; Nikki Brooke (Heritage); Lawrence Gwynn (Independent) (Note: was a member of Reform UK until 1 April 2026) |
| Caerdydd Ffynnon; Taf | 2 | Jackie Jones (5,630.5) | **Zaynub Akbar (16,308.5)** | Samantha Cohan | David Parsons (8,667.5) | Joe Carter | Charlotte Husnjak (4,518) | Propel: 1. Keith Parry; 2. Roy Leyshon; Welsh TUSC: 1. John Aaron Williams; 2. Helen Perriam; 3. David Bartlett; Nikki Brooke (Heritage); Lawrence Gwynn (Independent) |
| Caerdydd Ffynnon; Taf | 3 | Dan De'Ath | **Nick Carter (10,872.33)** | Joe Roberts | Aaeron Giboney | Julie Goodfellow | Laurie Gray | Propel: 1. Keith Parry; 2. Roy Leyshon; Welsh TUSC: 1. John Aaron Williams; 2. Helen Perriam; 3. David Bartlett; Nikki Brooke (Heritage); Lawrence Gwynn (Independent) |
| Caerdydd Ffynnon; Taf | 4 | Sarah Merry | Andrea Gibson (8,154.25) | Ffinian Elliott | Kenzie Hollingsworth Evans | Jon Shimmin | Jenny Mears | Propel: 1. Keith Parry; 2. Roy Leyshon; Welsh TUSC: 1. John Aaron Williams; 2. Helen Perriam; 3. David Bartlett; Nikki Brooke (Heritage); Lawrence Gwynn (Independent) |
| Caerdydd Ffynnon; Taf | 5 | Jen Burke | Joseff Gnagbo | Lyn Hudson | Jeffrey Armstrong | Imran Latif | Robyn Thomas | Propel: 1. Keith Parry; 2. Roy Leyshon; Welsh TUSC: 1. John Aaron Williams; 2. Helen Perriam; 3. David Bartlett; Nikki Brooke (Heritage); Lawrence Gwynn (Independent) |
| Caerdydd Ffynnon; Taf | 6 | Lee Bridgeman | Morgan Barber-Rogers | Jane Lucas | Valerie Ann Cousins | Rosemary Chaloner | David Fitzpatrick | Propel: 1. Keith Parry; 2. Roy Leyshon; Welsh TUSC: 1. John Aaron Williams; 2. Helen Perriam; 3. David Bartlett; Nikki Brooke (Heritage); Lawrence Gwynn (Independent) |
| Caerdydd Ffynnon; Taf | 7 | Matt Hexter | | | | | | Propel: 1. Keith Parry; 2. Roy Leyshon; Welsh TUSC: 1. John Aaron Williams; 2. Helen Perriam; 3. David Bartlett; Nikki Brooke (Heritage); Lawrence Gwynn (Independent) |
| Caerdydd Ffynnon; Taf | 8 | Bernie Bowen-Thomson | | | | | | Propel: 1. Keith Parry; 2. Roy Leyshon; Welsh TUSC: 1. John Aaron Williams; 2. Helen Perriam; 3. David Bartlett; Nikki Brooke (Heritage); Lawrence Gwynn (Independent) |
| Caerdydd Penarth | 1 | **Huw Thomas (10,907)** | **Anna Brychan (36,136)** | Calum Davies (6,818) | **Joseph Martin (15,525)** | Cadan ap Tomos (2,260) | **Anthony Slaughter (12,113)** | Propel: 1. Neil McEvoy; 2. Ceri McEvoy; Robert Griffiths (Communist); Rhiannon Morrissey (Heritage); Rhys ab Owen (inc.) (Independent) |
| Caerdydd Penarth | 2 | Ruba Sivanangam (5,453.5) | **Kiera Marshall (18,068)** | James Hamblin | Mark Reckless (7,762.5) | Irfan Latif | Tessa Marshall (6,056.5) | Propel: 1. Neil McEvoy; 2. Ceri McEvoy; Robert Griffiths (Communist); Rhiannon Morrissey (Heritage); Rhys ab Owen (inc.) (Independent) |
| Caerdydd Penarth | 3 | Peter Bradbury | **Leticia Gonzalez (12,045.33)** | Dominic Davies | Robert Thomas | Elinor Dixon | Rowan Stanger | Propel: 1. Neil McEvoy; 2. Ceri McEvoy; Robert Griffiths (Communist); Rhiannon Morrissey (Heritage); Rhys ab Owen (inc.) (Independent) |
| Caerdydd Penarth | 4 | Steve Brooks | Malcolm Phillips (9,034) | Judith Child | Rachel Nugent Finn | Barry Southwell | Tavgar Bulbas | Propel: 1. Neil McEvoy; 2. Ceri McEvoy; Robert Griffiths (Communist); Rhiannon Morrissey (Heritage); Rhys ab Owen (inc.) (Independent) |
| Caerdydd Penarth | 5 | Mutale Merrill | Matthew Hawkins | Archie Draycott | Paul Campbell | Chris Cogger | Max O'Hara | Propel: 1. Neil McEvoy; 2. Ceri McEvoy; Robert Griffiths (Communist); Rhiannon Morrissey (Heritage); Rhys ab Owen (inc.) (Independent) |
| Caerdydd Penarth | 6 | Kanaya Singh | Tomos Stokes | Eddy Oko-Jaja | Ruth Hancock | Ashley Wood | Iwan Sinclair | Propel: 1. Neil McEvoy; 2. Ceri McEvoy; Robert Griffiths (Communist); Rhiannon Morrissey (Heritage); Rhys ab Owen (inc.) (Independent) |
| Caerdydd Penarth | 7 | Laura Rochefort | | | | | | Propel: 1. Neil McEvoy; 2. Ceri McEvoy; Robert Griffiths (Communist); Rhiannon Morrissey (Heritage); Rhys ab Owen (inc.) (Independent) |
| Caerdydd Penarth | 8 | | | | | | | Propel: 1. Neil McEvoy; 2. Ceri McEvoy; Robert Griffiths (Communist); Rhiannon Morrissey (Heritage); Rhys ab Owen (inc.) (Independent) |
| Casnewydd Islwyn | 1 | **Jayne Bryant (10,622)** (inc.) | **Peredur Owen Griffiths (23,069)** (inc.) | **Natasha Asghar (8,847)** (inc.) | **Dan Thomas (25,571)** | Mike Hamilton (2,853) | Lauren James (5,898) | Open Party: 1. Justna Muhith (435); 2. John Horan; Mike Ford (349) (Heritage); Taran Clayton (Independent) |
| Casnewydd Islwyn | 2 | Rhianon Passmore (5,311) (inc.) | **Lyn Ackerman (11,534.5)** | Toby Jones (4,423.5) | **Art Wright (12,785.5)** | John Miller | Phil Davies | Open Party: 1. Justna Muhith (435); 2. John Horan; Mike Ford (349) (Heritage); Taran Clayton (Independent) |
| Casnewydd Islwyn | 3 | Chris Carter | Rhys Mills (7,689.67) | Jake Enea | Marie-Claire Lea (8,523.67) | Nurul Islam | Zaynab Greengrass | Open Party: 1. Justna Muhith (435); 2. John Horan; Mike Ford (349) (Heritage); Taran Clayton (Independent) |
| Casnewydd Islwyn | 4 | Rhian Howells | Josh Rawcliffe | Georgina Webb | Nicholas Jones | Harun Rashid | Kerry Vosper | Open Party: 1. Justna Muhith (435); 2. John Horan; Mike Ford (349) (Heritage); Taran Clayton (Independent) |
| Casnewydd Islwyn | 5 | Julie Sangani | Jonathan Clark | Adam Morris | Rebecca Senior | Mary Lloyd | David Mayer | Open Party: 1. Justna Muhith (435); 2. John Horan; Mike Ford (349) (Heritage); Taran Clayton (Independent) |
| Casnewydd Islwyn | 6 | Stephen Marshall | Sarah Henton | Rebecca Nyasha Mamhende | Tomos Llewellyn | Jeff Evans | Andrew Were | Open Party: 1. Justna Muhith (435); 2. John Horan; Mike Ford (349) (Heritage); Taran Clayton (Independent) |
| Casnewydd Islwyn | 7 | David Chinnick | | | | | | Open Party: 1. Justna Muhith (435); 2. John Horan; Mike Ford (349) (Heritage); Taran Clayton (Independent) |
| Casnewydd Islwyn | 8 | | | | | | | Open Party: 1. Justna Muhith (435); 2. John Horan; Mike Ford (349) (Heritage); Taran Clayton (Independent) |
| Ceredigion Penfro | 1 | Eluned Morgan (6,495) (inc.) | **Elin Jones (31,943)** (inc.) | **Paul Davies (14,789)** (inc.) | **Claire Archibald (23,003)** | Sandra Jervis (4,613) | Amy Nicholass (6,324) | Aaron Carey (Independent); George Chadzy (Independent) (Note: was a member of Advance UK until 19 March 2026); Paul Dowson (Independent) (Note: was a member of Restore Britain on registration of candidacy date); Gwyn Wigley Evans (Gwlad); Elizabeth Davies (Heritage) |
| Ceredigion Penfro | 2 | Marc Tierney | **Kerry Ferguson (15,971.5)** | Samuel Kurtz (7,394.5) (inc.) | **Paul Marr (11,501.5)** | Alistair Cameron | Tomass Jerminovics | Aaron Carey (Independent); George Chadzy (Independent); Paul Dowson (Independent); Gwyn Wigley Evans (Gwlad); Elizabeth Davies (Heritage) |
| Ceredigion Penfro | 3 | Joshua Phillips | **Anna Nicholl (10,647.67)** | Claire George | Michael Allen (7,667.67) | Thomas Hughes | James Purchase | Aaron Carey (Independent); George Chadzy (Independent); Paul Dowson (Independent); Gwyn Wigley Evans (Gwlad); Elizabeth Davies (Heritage) |
| Ceredigion Penfro | 4 | Margaret Greenaway | Cris Tomos (7,985.75) | Brian Murphy | Elisa Randall | Lee Herring | Morgan Phillips | Aaron Carey (Independent); George Chadzy (Independent); Paul Dowson (Independent); Gwyn Wigley Evans (Gwlad); Elizabeth Davies (Heritage) |
| Ceredigion Penfro | 5 | Tansaim Hussain-Gul | Colin Nosworthy | Gill Evans | Peter John | Andrew Lye | Rosie O'Toole | Aaron Carey (Independent); George Chadzy (Independent); Paul Dowson (Independent); Gwyn Wigley Evans (Gwlad); Elizabeth Davies (Heritage) |
| Ceredigion Penfro | 6 | Luke Davies-Jones | Clive Davies | Claire Jones | Bernard Holton | Maggie Robinson | Kezia Hine | Aaron Carey (Independent); George Chadzy (Independent); Paul Dowson (Independent); Gwyn Wigley Evans (Gwlad); Elizabeth Davies (Heritage) |
| Ceredigion Penfro | 7 | Peter Huw Jenkins | Owain Jones | | | | | Aaron Carey (Independent); George Chadzy (Independent); Paul Dowson (Independent); Gwyn Wigley Evans (Gwlad); Elizabeth Davies (Heritage) |
| Ceredigion Penfro | 8 | | Matt Adams | | | | | Aaron Carey (Independent); George Chadzy (Independent); Paul Dowson (Independent); Gwyn Wigley Evans (Gwlad); Elizabeth Davies (Heritage) |
| Clwyd | 1 | Hannah Blythyn (8,314) (inc.) | **Llyr Gruffydd (22,583)** (inc.) | **Darren Millar (16,193)** (inc.) | **Adrian Mason (25,741)** | David Wilkins (2,355) | Martyn Hogg (4,219) | Robert Redhead (Heritage) |
| Clwyd | 2 | Carolyn Thomas (inc.) | **Becca Martin (11,291.5)** | Gareth Davies (8,096.5)(inc.) | **Louise Emery (12,870.5)** | Bobby Feeley | Carly Murdoch-Dyson | Robert Redhead (Heritage) |
| Clwyd | 3 | Crispin Jones | Oliver Bradley-Hughes (7,627.67) | Gareth Ffowcs Williams | **Thomas Montgomery (8,580.33)** | Nanette Davies | Lucy Sutton | Robert Redhead (Heritage) |
| Clwyd | 4 | Ellen Jones | Paul Penlington | Justine Evans | David Smith (6,435.25) | Simon Croft | Karl McNaughton | Robert Redhead (Heritage) |
| Clwyd | 5 | Rajeev Metri | Delyth Jones | Sylvia Clough-Hughes | Kristian Salkeld | Jason Higgins | David Blainey | Robert Redhead (Heritage) |
| Clwyd | 6 | Catherine Claydon | Abdul Khan | Damon Richards-Gwilliam | Tony Thomas | Keith Kirwan | Cheryl Buxton-Sait | Robert Redhead (Heritage) |
| Clwyd | 7 | Arran Fearn | | Mike Gebreyohanes | | | | Robert Redhead (Heritage) |
| Clwyd | 8 | Cheryl Williams | | | | | | Robert Redhead (Heritage) |
| Fflint Wrecsam | 1 | **Ken Skates (8,555)** (inc.) | **Carrie Harper (18,440)** | **Sam Rowlands (9,017)** (inc.) | **Cristiana Emsley (25,349)** | Tim Sly (2,647) | Lee Lavery (5,138) | Kristina Renshaw (Heritage); Andrew Williams (Independent) (Note: was a member of Reform UK on registration of candidacy date); Daniel McNay (Social Democratic Party) |
| Fflint Wrecsam | 2 | Jack Sargeant (4,277.5) (inc.) | **Marc Jones (9,220)** | Jeremy Kent (4,508.5) | **Nigel Williams (12,674.5)** | Richard Marbrow | Seki Tabasuares | Kristina Renshaw (Heritage); Andrew Williams (Independent); Daniel McNay (Social Democratic Party) |
| Fflint Wrecsam | 3 | Corin Jarvis | Kayleigh Unitt (6,146.67) | James Ecroyd | William Paul Ashton (8,449.67) | Heather Prydderch | Graham Bannister-Kelly | Kristina Renshaw (Heritage); Andrew Williams (Independent); Daniel McNay (Social Democratic Party) |
| Fflint Wrecsam | 4 | Norma Ann Davies | Dean Davies | Kathy Cracknell | Helen Brown | Lionel Prouve | Suzanne Glascott | Kristina Renshaw (Heritage); Andrew Williams (Independent); Daniel McNay (Social Democratic Party) |
| Fflint Wrecsam | 5 | George Stephen Thomas | Annette Davies | Alex Rooney | Michael Budden | Carole O'Toole | Kathryn Price | Kristina Renshaw (Heritage); Andrew Williams (Independent); Daniel McNay (Social Democratic Party) |
| Fflint Wrecsam | 6 | Tracey Jane Sutton-Postlewaite | Andy Gallanders | Lewis Norton | David William Vernon | Graham Kelly | Helen Mitchell | Kristina Renshaw (Heritage); Andrew Williams (Independent); Daniel McNay (Social Democratic Party) |
| Fflint Wrecsam | 7 | | | | | | | Kristina Renshaw (Heritage); Andrew Williams (Independent); Daniel McNay (Social Democratic Party) |
| Fflint Wrecsam | 8 | | | | | | | Kristina Renshaw (Heritage); Andrew Williams (Independent); Daniel McNay (Social Democratic Party) |
| Gwynedd Maldwyn | 1 | Ian Parry (4,466) | **Siân Gwenllian (36,087)** (inc.) | Aled Davies (5,650) | **Andrew Griffin (22,667)** | Glyn Preston (4,554) | Nathan Jarvis (4,090) | Jeremy Daviesn (Gwlad); Mattie Ginsberg (Heritage); Russell George (inc.) (Independent); Monty Kennard (Independent) |
| Gwynedd Maldwyn | 2 | Dawn McGuinness | **Mabon ap Gwynfor (18,043.5)** (inc.) | Henrietta Hensher | **Claire Johnson-Wood (11,333.5)** | Stephen Churchman | Nicole Wait | Jeremy Daviesn (Gwlad); Mattie Ginsberg (Heritage); Russell George (inc.) (Independent); Monty Kennard (Independent) |
| Gwynedd Maldwyn | 3 | Steffan Chambers | **Beca Brown (12,029)** | Peter Lewington | Karl Lewis (7,555.67) | Richard Church | Sue MacFarlane | Jeremy Daviesn (Gwlad); Mattie Ginsberg (Heritage); Russell George (inc.) (Independent); Monty Kennard (Independent) |
| Gwynedd Maldwyn | 4 | Dana Davies | **Elwyn Vaughan (9,021.75)** | Hedd Thomas | Phillip Robinson | Pete Roberts | Sian Thomas | Jeremy Daviesn (Gwlad); Mattie Ginsberg (Heritage); Russell George (inc.) (Independent); Monty Kennard (Independent) |
| Gwynedd Maldwyn | 5 | Mathew Norman | Elin Hywel (7,217.4) | Daniel Spilsbury | Mark Blake | Carol Robinson | Curtis Wilford | Jeremy Daviesn (Gwlad); Mattie Ginsberg (Heritage); Russell George (inc.) (Independent); Monty Kennard (Independent) |
| Gwynedd Maldwyn | 6 | Morgan Peters | Donna O'Brien | Roger Cracknell | Richard Pendry | Chris Lloyd | Edward Mason | Jeremy Daviesn (Gwlad); Mattie Ginsberg (Heritage); Russell George (inc.) (Independent); Monty Kennard (Independent) |
| Gwynedd Maldwyn | 7 | | Victoria Evans | | | | | Jeremy Daviesn (Gwlad); Mattie Ginsberg (Heritage); Russell George (inc.) (Independent); Monty Kennard (Independent) |
| Gwynedd Maldwyn | 8 | | Elfed ap Elwyn | | | | | Jeremy Daviesn (Gwlad); Mattie Ginsberg (Heritage); Russell George (inc.) (Independent); Monty Kennard (Independent) |
| Gŵyr Abertawe | 1 | **Mike Hedges (11,195)** (inc.) | **Gwyn Williams (25,076)** | Tom Giffard (7,523) (inc.) | **Francesca O'Brien (21,641)** | Sam Bennett (6,262) | Chris Evans (6,383) | Welsh TUSC: 1. Ben Golightly; 2. Mark Evans; Christy Galt (Heritage); Katon Bouzalakos (Independent); Dan Brown (Independent); Emma Mcnamara (Independent) |
| Gŵyr Abertawe | 2 | Rob Stewart (5,597.5) | **Safa Elhassan (12,538)** | Tara-Jane Sutcliffe | **Steven Rodaway (10,820.5)** | Helen Ceri Clarke | Lilian Martin | Welsh TUSC: 1. Ben Golightly; 2. Mark Evans; Christy Galt (Heritage); Katon Bouzalakos (Independent); Dan Brown (Independent); Emma Mcnamara (Independent) |
| Gŵyr Abertawe | 3 | Rebecca Fogarty | **John Davies (8,358.67)** | Jake Harry | Wayne Parsons (7,213.67) | Mike O'Carroll | Nigel Hill | Welsh TUSC: 1. Ben Golightly; 2. Mark Evans; Christy Galt (Heritage); Katon Bouzalakos (Independent); Dan Brown (Independent); Emma Mcnamara (Independent) |
| Gŵyr Abertawe | 4 | Rebecca Francis‑Davies | Rhiannon Barrar (6,269) | Carley Morgan | Gareth Turner | Christopher Holley | Cari Bishop-Jones | Welsh TUSC: 1. Ben Golightly; 2. Mark Evans; Christy Galt (Heritage); Katon Bouzalakos (Independent); Dan Brown (Independent); Emma Mcnamara (Independent) |
| Gŵyr Abertawe | 5 | Kemba Hadaway‑Morgan | Dafydd Williams | Laura Gilbert | Scott Thorley | Mary Jones | Will Beasley | Welsh TUSC: 1. Ben Golightly; 2. Mark Evans; Christy Galt (Heritage); Katon Bouzalakos (Independent); Dan Brown (Independent); Emma Mcnamara (Independent) |
| Gŵyr Abertawe | 6 | Patience Bentu | Harri Roberts | Idin Ghotbi | Nicola Clarke | Howard Evans | David Halfacree | Welsh TUSC: 1. Ben Golightly; 2. Mark Evans; Christy Galt (Heritage); Katon Bouzalakos (Independent); Dan Brown (Independent); Emma Mcnamara (Independent) |
| Gŵyr Abertawe | 7 | | | | | | | Welsh TUSC: 1. Ben Golightly; 2. Mark Evans; Christy Galt (Heritage); Katon Bouzalakos (Independent); Dan Brown (Independent); Emma Mcnamara (Independent) |
| Gŵyr Abertawe | 8 | | | | | | | Welsh TUSC: 1. Ben Golightly; 2. Mark Evans; Christy Galt (Heritage); Katon Bouzalakos (Independent); Dan Brown (Independent); Emma Mcnamara (Independent) |
| Pen-y-bont Bro; Morgannwg | 1 | **Sarah Murphy (9,518)** (inc.) | **Mark Hooper (27,407)** | **Andrew RT Davies (12,464)** (inc.) | **Sarah Cooper Lesadd (24,602)** | Steven Rajam (2,175) | Amy Greenfield (4,220) | Gillian White (429) (Heritage); William Jeffreys (221) (Independent); Caroline Jones (651) (Independent) (Note: was a member of Reform UK until 6 April 2026); Lucia Wyatt (114) (Independent) |
| Pen-y-bont Bro; Morgannwg | 2 | Huw David (4,759) | **Sarah Rees (13,703.5)** | Altaf Hussain (6,232) (inc.) | **Gareth Thomas (12,301)** | Gabriela Ferguson | Saar Lenaerts | Gillian White (429) (Heritage); William Jeffreys (221) (Independent); Caroline Jones (651) (Independent); Lucia Wyatt (114) (Independent) |
| Pen-y-bont Bro; Morgannwg | 3 | Carys Stallard | Luke Fletcher (9,135.67)(inc.) | Jonathan Pratt | Paul Young (8,200.67) | Paula Gülen Yates | Rob Sage | Gillian White (429) (Heritage); William Jeffreys (221) (Independent); Caroline Jones (651) (Independent); Lucia Wyatt (114) (Independent) |
| Pen-y-bont Bro; Morgannwg | 4 | Jonathan Cox | Marianne Cowpe | Kate Thomas | Emma Clatworthy | Wayne Street | Aaron Steer | Gillian White (429) (Heritage); William Jeffreys (221) (Independent); Caroline Jones (651) (Independent); Lucia Wyatt (114) (Independent) |
| Pen-y-bont Bro; Morgannwg | 5 | Jon-Paul Blundell | Ian Johnson | Rebekah Fudge | Valerie Ellis | Joe Boyle | Todd Bailey | Gillian White (429) (Heritage); William Jeffreys (221) (Independent); Caroline Jones (651) (Independent); Lucia Wyatt (114) (Independent) |
| Pen-y-bont Bro; Morgannwg | 6 | Helen Payne | Iolo Cauldy | Michael Bryan | Dennis Coughlin | Matthew Dixon | Andy Roberts | Gillian White (429) (Heritage); William Jeffreys (221) (Independent); Caroline Jones (651) (Independent); Lucia Wyatt (114) (Independent) |
| Pen-y-bont Bro; Morgannwg | 7 | Neelo Farr | Dennis Clarke | | | | | Gillian White (429) (Heritage); William Jeffreys (221) (Independent); Caroline Jones (651) (Independent); Lucia Wyatt (114) (Independent) |
| Pen-y-bont Bro; Morgannwg | 8 | Rhys Goode | | | | | | Gillian White (429) (Heritage); William Jeffreys (221) (Independent); Caroline Jones (651) (Independent); Lucia Wyatt (114) (Independent) |
| Pontypridd Cynon; Merthyr | 1 | **Vikki Howells (9,344)** (inc.) | **Heledd Fychan (28,687)** (inc.) | Adam Robinson (4,339) | **Jason O'Connell (22,217)** | Neil Feist (1,393) | Angela Karadog (3,466) | Beth Winter (Independent) (Note: was a member of Your Party until 2 February 2026); Stef Morgan (Gwlad); Julie Lloyd (Heritage); Joseph Biddulph (Independent); Dai Williams (Independent) |
| Pontypridd Cynon; Merthyr | 2 | Lloyd Watkins (4,672) | **Lis McLean (14,343.5)** | David William Jones | **David Hughes (11,108.5)** | David Seale | James Bennett | Beth Winter (Independent); Stef Morgan (Gwlad); Julie Lloyd (Heritage); Joseph Biddulph (Independent); Dai Williams (Independent) |
| Pontypridd Cynon; Merthyr | 3 | Chris Binding | **Sara Crowley (9,562.33)** | Roxanne Rees | Mark Lawrence (7,405.67) | Alec Dauncey | John Le Marchant Dane | Beth Winter (Independent); Stef Morgan (Gwlad); Julie Lloyd (Heritage); Joseph Biddulph (Independent); Dai Williams (Independent) |
| Pontypridd Cynon; Merthyr | 4 | Mitch Theaker | Ian Gwynne (7,171.75) | Lee Davies | Martin Roberts | Nick Beckett | Georgina Budd | Beth Winter (Independent); Stef Morgan (Gwlad); Julie Lloyd (Heritage); Joseph Biddulph (Independent); Dai Williams (Independent) |
| Pontypridd Cynon; Merthyr | 5 | Mustapha Maohoub | Farrell Perks | Oliver Morgan | John Ball | Chris Passmore | Zara Siddique | Beth Winter (Independent); Stef Morgan (Gwlad); Julie Lloyd (Heritage); Joseph Biddulph (Independent); Dai Williams (Independent) |
| Pontypridd Cynon; Merthyr | 6 | Anna Williams Price | Ioan Bellin | Jayne McKenna | Jamie Loftus | Hayden Lewis | Jeff Baxter | Beth Winter (Independent); Stef Morgan (Gwlad); Julie Lloyd (Heritage); Joseph Biddulph (Independent); Dai Williams (Independent) |
| Pontypridd Cynon; Merthyr | 7 | Jane Gebbie | | | | | | Beth Winter (Independent); Stef Morgan (Gwlad); Julie Lloyd (Heritage); Joseph Biddulph (Independent); Dai Williams (Independent) |
| Pontypridd Cynon; Merthyr | 8 | | | | | | | Beth Winter (Independent); Stef Morgan (Gwlad); Julie Lloyd (Heritage); Joseph Biddulph (Independent); Dai Williams (Independent) |
| Sir Fynwy Torfaen | 1 | **Lynne Neagle (11,672)** (inc.) | **Matthew Jones (18,275)** | **Peter Fox (13,394)** (inc.) | **Laura Anne Jones (24,155)** (inc.) | Kevin Wilkins (2,742) | Ian Chandler (6,375) | Open Party; 1. Joseph Nicholson; 2. David Atkins; Brad Williams (Gwlad); Emma Meredith (Heritage); Owen Lewis (Independent); Welsh Pool (Independent) |
| Sir Fynwy Torfaen | 2 | Anthony Hunt (5,836) | **Donna Cushing (9,137.5)** | Richard John (6,697) | **Stephen Senior (12,077.5)** | Brendan Roberts | Emily Williams | Open Party; 1. Joseph Nicholson; 2. David Atkins; Brad Williams (Gwlad); Emma Meredith (Heritage); Owen Lewis (Independent); Welsh Pool (Independent) |
| Sir Fynwy Torfaen | 3 | Laura Wright | Jayne Israel (6,091.67) | Lisa Dymock | Bob Blacker (8,051.67) | Vicky Hepburn-John | Charlie Aldous | Open Party; 1. Joseph Nicholson; 2. David Atkins; Brad Williams (Gwlad); Emma Meredith (Heritage); Owen Lewis (Independent); Welsh Pool (Independent) |
| Sir Fynwy Torfaen | 4 | Catrin Maby | David Johnson | Nathan Edmunds | David Rowlands | Anthea Dewhurst | Lauren Sellers | Open Party; 1. Joseph Nicholson; 2. David Atkins; Brad Williams (Gwlad); Emma Meredith (Heritage); Owen Lewis (Independent); Welsh Pool (Independent) |
| Sir Fynwy Torfaen | 5 | Ben Callard | Loti Glyn | Rachel Buckler | Mark Urrutia | Martin Sutherland | Darren Share | Open Party; 1. Joseph Nicholson; 2. David Atkins; Brad Williams (Gwlad); Emma Meredith (Heritage); Owen Lewis (Independent); Welsh Pool (Independent) |
| Sir Fynwy Torfaen | 6 | Nick Byrne | Huw Evans | Chase Blount | Gerard Hancock | Iwan Thomas | Angus Paget | Open Party; 1. Joseph Nicholson; 2. David Atkins; Brad Williams (Gwlad); Emma Meredith (Heritage); Owen Lewis (Independent); Welsh Pool (Independent) |
| Sir Fynwy Torfaen | 7 | Su McConnel | | | | | | Open Party; 1. Joseph Nicholson; 2. David Atkins; Brad Williams (Gwlad); Emma Meredith (Heritage); Owen Lewis (Independent); Welsh Pool (Independent) |
| Sir Fynwy Torfaen | 8 | | | | | | | Open Party; 1. Joseph Nicholson; 2. David Atkins; Brad Williams (Gwlad); Emma Meredith (Heritage); Owen Lewis (Independent); Welsh Pool (Independent) |
| Sir Gaerfyrddin | 1 | Calum Higgins (6,458) | **Cefin Campbell (36,160)** (inc.) | Richard Williams (5,853) | **Gareth Beer (27,542)** | Justin Griffiths (1,662) | Rob James (3,832) | Stephen Williams (Independent); Wayne Erasmus (Gwlad); Jason Barker (Heritage); Carl Peters-Bond (Independent); Jonathan Rose (Independent) (Note: was a member of the Official Monster Raving Loony Party on registration of candidacy date) |
| Sir Gaerfyrddin | 2 | Dawn Evans | **Nerys Evans (18,080)** | Lee Stabbins | **Carmelo Colasanto (13,771)** | Julian Tandy | Nick Pearce | Stephen Williams (Independent); Wayne Erasmus (Gwlad); Jason Barker (Heritage); Carl Peters-Bond (Independent); Jonathan Rose (Independent) |
| Sir Gaerfyrddin | 3 | Martyn Palfreman | **Adam Price (12,053.33)** (inc.) | Oliver Wilson | **Sarah Edwards (9,180.67)** | Jonathan Burree | Craig Davies | Stephen Williams (Independent); Wayne Erasmus (Gwlad); Jason Barker (Heritage); Carl Peters-Bond (Independent); Jonathan Rose (Independent) |
| Sir Gaerfyrddin | 4 | David Darkin | Mari Arthur (9,040) | Bradley Williams | Christopher Brooke (6,885.5) | Lynne Wilkins | David Lishman | Stephen Williams (Independent); Wayne Erasmus (Gwlad); Jason Barker (Heritage); Carl Peters-Bond (Independent); Jonathan Rose (Independent) |
| Sir Gaerfyrddin | 5 | Lewis Davies | Iwan Griffiths | Natasha Rowlands | Alan Cole | Monica French | Helen Draper | Stephen Williams (Independent); Wayne Erasmus (Gwlad); Jason Barker (Heritage); Carl Peters-Bond (Independent); Jonathan Rose (Independent) |
| Sir Gaerfyrddin | 6 | Andre McPherson | Abi Thomas | Ben Sansome | Michelle Beer | Caryl Tandy | Michael Willis | Stephen Williams (Independent); Wayne Erasmus (Gwlad); Jason Barker (Heritage); Carl Peters-Bond (Independent); Jonathan Rose (Independent) |
| Sir Gaerfyrddin | 7 | | Taylor Reynolds | | | | | Stephen Williams (Independent); Wayne Erasmus (Gwlad); Jason Barker (Heritage); Carl Peters-Bond (Independent); Jonathan Rose (Independent) |
| Sir Gaerfyrddin | 8 | | Jordan Griffiths | | | | | Stephen Williams (Independent); Wayne Erasmus (Gwlad); Jason Barker (Heritage); Carl Peters-Bond (Independent); Jonathan Rose (Independent) |

== Campaign ==
According to Professor John Curtice, campaign issues included the economy, cost of living, health and social care services, and immigration. However, immigration is not controlled by the Senedd and is a power reserved to the UK parliament.

On 2 February 2025, Welsh Labour leader Eluned Morgan said she would be open to a coalition with Plaid Cymru after the election "if needs must". She ruled out a coalition with Reform UK, as she thought there was a "red line on that one". She rejected the suggestion put to her that Welsh Labour was under threat at the election, explaining that there is "an international shift going on at the moment and we've got several months now to make sure people understand what's at stake here", and also called Reform an "English focused party" with "nothing Welsh about" them. This election has been described as pivotal for the premiership of Keir Starmer. Morgan warned that a "threat to the United Kingdom will become real" if Plaid and the Green Party gain a majority in the Senedd, calling for further devolution, calling it the "best way to lower the temperature and raise trust."

A day later, Plaid Cymru leader Rhun ap Iorwerth similarly ruled out working with Reform, describing the two parties' worldviews as "fundamentally different." In April 2025, Reform UK leader Nigel Farage said his party "would work with any other Senedd party" and that the new voting system means "it's not going to be easy" to win an overall majority.

On 21 March 2025, Plaid Cymru announced a pledge to introduce a weekly direct child benefit titled the 'Cynnal' payment, which would share similarities to the Scottish Child Payment introduced by the Scottish Government. This was followed by a pledge on 10 October to expand universal childcare in Wales, bringing 20 hours of childcare a week for 48 weeks a year, eligible to all children aged 9 months to 4 years.

After becoming the most popular party leader in opinion polls in early 2025, ap Iorwerth ruled out holding an independence referendum in a first term of a Plaid Cymru government, in contrast to the party's 2021 manifesto, stating that they still kept a "long term ambition" of Welsh independence.

Following the election of Zack Polanski as Green Party leader in September 2025, the party's popularity rose sharply. Their positive relationship with Plaid Cymru could lead to collaboration of some sort; however, ap Iorwerth said he would prefer a minority government over any coalition.

On 5 February 2026 Reform UK announced Dan Thomas as their leader in Wales, although he was an unknown figure in Wales having moved away in 1999 and was a Conservative Party councillor on Barnet London Borough Council from 2006 to 2025.

On 27 and 28 February Plaid Cymru held their spring conference, and announced their plan for first 100 days in government which announced many of their policies before their full manifesto.

On 1 March 2026, Eluned Morgan announced that if Welsh Labour wins the Senedd election they would spend £4 billion to build the "hospitals of the future".

On 2 March 2026, the Welsh Conservatives launched their manifesto. They proposed to build the M4 relief road, take 1 pence off the basic rate of income tax alongside scrapping business rates for small firms and re-establishing the Welsh Development Agency. The party also announced its intention to reverse the 20mph national default speed limit, scrap the Nation of Sanctuary initiative, and place restrictions on wind farm developments.

On 3 March 2026, the Welsh Liberal Democrats called for £10 million for cross‑border healthcare in Powys.

On 5 March 2026, Reform UK launched their Welsh manifesto in Newport, where Nigel Farage called the election a referendum on the Prime Minister's leadership. The party pledged several policies that were similarly included in the Welsh Conservative manifesto, such as 1 pence income tax cuts, reversing of the default 20mph speed limit and scrapping the Nation of Sanctuary. The party also pledged to build the M4 relief road, intending to establish it as a toll road, make local people in Wales a priority for social housing, abolish Natural Resources Wales, as well as proposing a ban on any new onshore wind farms.

On 26 March 2026, the Welsh Conservatives launched their election campaign in Swansea.

On 27 March 2026, a leading Reform UK candidate – who was formerly a Conservative special adviser – stepped down from contesting the Senedd election after a photo was published appearing to show him performing a Nazi salute. Nigel Farage said the photo "looked terrible" and he "wouldn't approve of it" but that the candidate would not be kicked out of the party. The photo was published the day prior by Nation.Cymru and while the date of the photo has not been confirmed, Reform UK say it is from 2019.

On 30 March 2026, Eluned Morgan launched the Welsh Labour manifesto at an event in Swansea. Alongside their existing pledges the party committed to a freeze on the Welsh rates of income tax, pressing medical need being seen within 48 hours, extend free school meals to all secondary school pupils in receipt of universal credit, create 20,000 new childcare spaces and deliver 100,000 new homes over the next 10 years. On the same day Plaid Cymru launched their election campaign in Bedwas, with Rhun ap Iorwerth calling the election a two-horse race between Plaid and Reform for who will become the largest party.

By 31 March 2026, three Reform UK Senedd candidates had quit the party. Their reasons for leaving included the party's candidate selection process, betrayal of party members and prioritisation of former Conservative politicians over local people, with two of the three stating the party has too many former Conservatives. One of the former candidates criticised the party's top candidates for being driven by "power, money and self-interest".

On 31 March 2026, the Green Party election campaign was launched by Anthony Slaughter with the presence of Zack Polanski, where they also unveiled their full slate of candidates. The Green Party's pledges include lowering water bills via public ownership of water companies and rent controls.

On 7 April 2026, former UKIP politician Caroline Jones announced that she had left Reform UK due to parachute candidates being put on Reform constituencies lists before local members and 'allegations relating to racism and discrimination'.

On 8 April 2026, the Welsh Liberal Democrats campaign was launched by Jane Dodds in Swansea. Campaign pledges include £300 million for social care. Their manifesto was launched on 14 April.

=== Election debates ===
2026 Senedd election debates
| Date scheduled | Organisers | Moderator(s) | P Present (Note: Denotes a main invitee attending the event.) S Surrogate (Note: Denotes a main invitee not attending the event, sending a surrogate in their place.) NI Not invited A Absent invitee INV Invited | | | | | | | |
| Date scheduled | Organisers | Moderator(s) | Labour | Plaid Cymru | Conservatives | Reform UK | Lib Dems | Green | Venue | Ref. |
|---|---|---|---|---|---|---|---|---|---|---|
| 17 March | BBC Wales | Nick Servini | S Skates (Note: Ken Skates, Cabinet Secretary for Transport and lead candidate for the Fflint Wrecsam seat.) | S Harper (Note: Carrie Harper, Councillor on Wrexham County Borough Council and lead candidate for the Fflint Wrecsam seat.) | S Rowlands (Note: Sam Rowlands, MS for North Wales and lead candidate for the Fflint Wrecsam seat.) | S Evans (Note: James Evans, MS for Brecon and Radnorshire and lead candidate for the Brycheiniog Tawe Nedd seat.) | S Sly (Note: Tim Sly, President of the Welsh Liberal Democrats and lead candidate for the Fflint Wrecsam seat.) | S Lavery (Note: Lee Lavery, lead candidate for the Fflint Wrecsam seat.) | Wrexham | |
| 19 March | Tinopolis; Urdd | Siôn Jenkins | S Thomas (Note: Huw Thomas, Leader of Cardiff Council and lead candidate for the Caerdydd Penarth seat.) | S Jewell (Note: Delyth Jewell, MS for South Wales East and lead candidate for the Blaenau Gwent Caerffili Rhymni seat.) | S Giffard (Note: Tom Giffard, MS for South Wales East and lead candidate for the Gŵyr Abertawe seat.) | S Edwards (Note: Corey Edwards, was the lead candidate for the Pen-y-bont Bro Morgannwg seat, but stepped down.) | P Dodds | S Marshall (Note: Tessa Marshall is the second candidate for the Caerdydd Penarth seat.) | All Nations Centre, Cardiff | |
| 8 April | WalesOnline | Ruth Mosalski | P Morgan | P Ap Iorwerth | P Millar | P Thomas | P Dodds | P Slaughter | Cardiff School of Journalism | |
| 16 April | BBC Question Time | Fiona Bruce | S Irranca-Davies (Note: Huw Irranca-Davies, MS for Ogmore and lead candidate for the Afan Ogwr Rhondda seat.) | P Ap Iorwerth | P Millar | P Thomas | P Dodds | P Slaughter | Cardiff | |
| 19 April | ITV Wales | Adrian Masters | P Morgan | P Ap Iorwerth | P Millar | P Thomas | P Dodds | P Slaughter | Senedd | |
| 21 April | Channel 4 | Krishnan Guru-Murthy | P Morgan | P Ap Iorwerth | P Millar | P Thomas | P Dodds | P Slaughter | Senedd | |
| 23 April | BBC Cymru; Tinopolis | Bethan Rhys Roberts | P Morgan | P Ap Iorwerth | S Davies (Note: Paul Davies, MS for Preseli Pembrokeshire and lead candidate for the Ceredigion Penfro seat.) | S Jenner (Note: Helen Jenner, deputy leader of Reform UK Wales, is the lead candidate for the Bangor Conwy Môn seat.) | P Dodds | S Marshall (Note: Tessa Marshall is the second candidate for the Caerdydd Penarth seat.) | Canolfan S4C, Yr Egin, Carmarthen | |
| 28 April | BBC Wales | Bethan Rhys Roberts | P Morgan | P Ap Iorwerth | P Millar | P Thomas | P Dodds | P Slaughter | BBC Wales Headquarters, Cardiff | |
| 30 April | LBC | Iain Dale | P Morgan | P Ap Iorwerth | P Millar | P Thomas | P Dodds | P Slaughter | Global Studios, Cardiff | |

== Opinion polling ==
For the 2026 election, Wales was divided into 16 multi-member constituencies, each based on a pairing of two adjacent constituencies used for the UK Parliament since 2024. Each of these 16 constituencies elected six members of the Senedd using a system of proportional representation.

Labour led in most polls until early 2025, when opinion polls began to show Plaid Cymru and Reform as each leading or tied.

LOESS curve of polling conducted

Sample size below 1,000. (Note: The British Polling Council states that a sample size of at least 1,000 is the "established norm" for any poll in Great Britain. However, there is no "minimum" acceptable sample size.)

| Dates conducted | Pollster | Client | Sample size | Lab | Con | PC | Grn | LD | Ref | Others | Lead |
|---|---|---|---|---|---|---|---|---|---|---|---|
| 7 May 2026 | 2026 Senedd election | | – | 11.1% | 10.7% | 35.4% | 6.7% | 4.5% | 29.3% | 2.3% | 6.1 |
| 1–6 May 2026 | FindOutNow | N/A | 2,001 | 9% | 11% | 35% | 9% | 6% | 28% | 2% | 7 |
| 1–6 May 2026 | Survation | N/A | 1,054 | 15% | 10% | 30% | 7% | 6% | 28% | 3% | 2 |
| 27 Apr – 4 May 2026 | YouGov | ITV Cymru Wales / Cardiff University | 4,647 | 12% | 9% | 33% | 8% | 6% | 29% | 3% | 4 |
| 2 Mar – 27 Apr 2026 | More in Common | N/A | 2,159 | 16% | 12% | 30% | 9% | 4% | 27% | 2% | 3 |
| 17–23 Apr 2026 | Survation | S4C/Aberystwyth University | 834 | 15% | 10% | 28% | 10% | 4% | 30% | 4% | 2 |
| 18–22 Apr 2026 | Find Out Now | Plaid Cymru | 2,012 | 10% | 13% | 29% | 11% | 6% | 27% | 4% | 2 |
| 6–15 Apr 2026 | YouGov | ITV Cymru Wales / Cardiff University | 2,387 | 13% | 8% | 29% | 10% | 6% | 29% | 4% | Tie |
| 31 Mar – 13 Apr 2026 | JL Partners | The Telegraph | 2,050 | 16% | 12% | 29% | 9% | 6% | 25% | 4% | 4 |
| 30 Jan – 10 Apr 2026 | More in Common | N/A | 2,519 | 21% | 11% | 25% | 10% | 7% | 25% | 2% | Tie |
| 2–8 Apr 2026 | Ipsos | N/A | 747 | 15% | 12% | 30% | 10% | 6% | 25% | 2% | 5 |
| 2–22 Mar 2026 | Beaufort Research | Nation.Cymru | 459 | 17% | 9% | 30% | 11% | 6% | 27% | 2% | 3 |
| 9–18 Mar 2026 | YouGov | ITV Cymru Wales / Cardiff University | 2,978 | 13% | 7% | 33% | 12% | 5% | 27% | 4% | 6 |
| 15 Feb – 3 Mar 2026 | More in Common | N/A | 851 | 20% | 10% | 26% | 10% | 7% | 26% | 1% | Tie |
| 30 Jan – 10 Feb 2026 | More in Common | N/A | 806 | 20% | 13% | 24% | 5% | 6% | 31% | 1% | 7 |
| 19 Jan – 8 Feb 2026 | Beaufort Research | Nation.Cymru | 486 | 20% | 10% | 29% | 7% | 5% | 27% | 1% | 2 |
| 5–12 Jan 2026 | YouGov | ITV Cymru Wales / Cardiff University | 1,220 | 10% | 10% | 37% | 13% | 5% | 23% | 2% | 14 |
| 16 Dec – 4 Jan 2026 | FindOutNow | N/A | 1,503 | 12% | 12% | 30% | 9% | 7% | 29% | 2% | 1 |
| 28 Nov – 10 Dec 2025 | YouGov | Cardiff University | 1,891 | 10% | 10% | 33% | 9% | 6% | 30% | 2% | 3 |
| 10–30 Nov 2025 | Beaufort Research | Nation.Cymru | 505 | 21% | 12% | 26% | 9% | 3% | 27% | 1% | 1 |
| 23 Oct 2025 | 2025 Caerphilly by-election, Plaid Cymru gain from Labour | | | | | | | | | | |
| 22 Sep – 12 Oct 2025 | Beaufort Research | Nation.Cymru | 533 | 23% | 11% | 22% | 9% | 4% | 30% | 2% | 7 |
| 4–10 Sep 2025 | YouGov | Barn Cymru / ITV Cymru Wales / Cardiff University | 1,232 | 14% | 11% | 30% | 6% | 6% | 29% | 4% | 1 |
| 18 Jun – 3 Jul 2025 | Beaufort Research | Nation.Cymru | 400 | 27% | 13% | 21% | 6% | 5% | 25% | 2% | 2 |
| 18 Jun – 3 Jul 2025 | More in Common | Sky News | 883 | 23% | 10% | 26% | 4% | 7% | 28% | 2% | 2 |
| 5–16 Jun 2025 | FindOutNow | N/A | 2,101 | 18% | 11% | 27% | 7% | 7% | 29% | 1% | 2 |
| 23–30 Apr 2025 | YouGov | ITV Cymru Wales / Cardiff University | 1,265 | 18% | 13% | 30% | 5% | 7% | 25% | 2% | 5 |
| 10 Mar – 3 Apr 2025 | Survation | N/A | 809 | 27% | 15% | 24% | 5% | 5% | 24% | 1% | 3 |
| 3–23 Mar 2025 | Beaufort Research | Nation.Cymru | 1,000 | 27% | 16% | 24% | 5% | 4% | 23% | 1% | 3 |
| 25–29 Nov 2024 | YouGov | Barn Cymru | 1,121 | 23% | 19% | 24% | 6% | 5% | 23% | 1% | 1 |
| 4–24 Nov 2024 | Beaufort Research | Nation.Cymru | 500 | 27% | 18% | 17% | 6% | 6% | 24% | 2% | 3 |
| 18 Oct – 4 Nov 2024 | Survation (Note: Survation asked voters to give their preferences under the previous Additional Member System. The figure shown in this table is the proportional (regional) vote, as that is the closest equivalent to the new party list system.) | Reform UK | 2,006 | 29% | 18% | 20% | 7% | 7% | 19% | 1% | 9 |
| 24 Jul – 6 Aug 2024 | Eluned Morgan is elected leader of Welsh Labour and becomes First Minister of Wales | | | | | | | | | | |
| 5–18 Jul 2024 | Welsh Election Study | N/A | 2,565 | 25% | 16% | 24% | 6% | 6% | 16% | 8% AWA on 7% Other on 1% | 1 |
| 4 Jul 2024 | 2024 United Kingdom general election | | | | | | | | | | |
| 27 Jun – 1 Jul 2024 | YouGov | Barn Cymru | 1,072 | 27% | 18% | 23% | 5% | 6% | 18% | 3% | 4 |
| 5–7 Jun 2024 | Redfield & Wilton | N/A | 960 | 36% | 22% | 18% | 6% | 6% | 11% | 2% AWA on 2% Other on 0% | 14 |
| 30 May – 3 Jun 2024 | YouGov | Barn Cymru | 1,066 | 30% | 19% | 23% | 6% | 6% | 12% | 4% | 7 |
| 18–19 May 2024 | Redfield & Wilton | N/A | 900 | 37% | 20% | 20% | 5% | 3% | 10% | 5% AWA on 5% Other on 0% | 17 |
| 8 May 2024 | The Senedd Reform Act is approved, implementing a new one-list electoral system by 2026. | | | | | | | | | | |
| 6 May 2021 | 2021 Senedd election (regional) | | – | 36.2% | 25.1% | 20.7% | 4.4% | 4.3% | 1.1% | 8.2% | 11.1 |
| 6 May 2021 | 2021 Senedd election (constituency) | | – | 39.9% | 26.1% | 20.3% | 1.6% | 4.9% | 1.6% | 5.6% | 13.8 |

=== Seat projections ===
Various modelling efforts produced seat projections ahead of the election. Below are selected projections and the result of the previous election for comparison.

49 seats needed for a majority.

Seat projections by poll aggregators
| Organisation | Dates conducted | Lab | Con | PC | Grn | LD | Ref | Others | Majority |
|---|---|---|---|---|---|---|---|---|---|
| 2026 election | 7 May 2026 | 9 | 7 | 43 | 2 | 1 | 34 | 0 | Plaid Cymru −6 |
| YouGov | 25 Apr – 4 May 2026 | 12 | 4 | 43 | 2 | 1 | 34 | 0 | Plaid Cymru −6 |
| YouGov | 6 Apr – 15 Apr 2026 | 12 | 3 | 36 | 7 | 1 | 37 | 0 | Reform −12 |
| More in Common | 30 Jan – 10 Apr 2026 | 24 | 7 | 30 | 4 | 3 | 28 | 0 | Plaid Cymru −19 |
| Beaufort Research | 2 – 22 Mar 2026 | 15 | 6 | 37 | 6 | 2 | 30 | 0 | Plaid Cymru −12 |
| YouGov | 9 – 18 Mar 2026 | 12 | 1 | 43 | 10 | 0 | 30 | 0 | Plaid Cymru −6 |
| Beaufort Research | 19 Jan – 8 Feb 2026 | 23 | 7 | 35 | 1 | 1 | 29 | 0 | Plaid Cymru −14 |
| YouGov | 5 – 12 Jan 2026 | 8 | 6 | 45 | 11 | 3 | 23 | 0 | Plaid Cymru −4 |
| YouGov | 28 Nov – 10 Dec 2025 | 8 | 6 | 39 | 5 | 3 | 35 | 0 | Plaid Cymru −10 |
| Cavendish Cymru/NationCymru–Beaufort | 21 October 2025 | 24 | 7 | 25 | 2 | 1 | 37 | 0 | Reform −12 |
| 2021 election | 6 May 2021 | 30 | 16 | 13 | 0 | 1 | 0 | 0 | Labour −1 |

== Retiring members ==
The following MSs have announced their intention to not run for re-election:

| MS | Constituency/Region | First elected | Party | Date announced |
|---|---|---|---|---|
| Mark Drakeford | Cardiff West | 2011 | Labour | 9 August 2023 |
| Vaughan Gething | Cardiff South and Penarth | 2011 | Labour Co-op | 7 September 2024 |
| Lee Waters | Llanelli | 2016 | Labour Co-op | 24 October 2024 |
| Dawn Bowden | Merthyr Tydfil and Rhymney | 2016 | Labour | 17 January 2025 |
| Mick Antoniw | Pontypridd | 2011 | Labour Co-op | 24 January 2025 |
| Joyce Watson | Mid and West Wales | 2007 | Labour | 25 January 2025 |
| Rebecca Evans | Gower | 2011 | Labour Co-op | 8 February 2025 |
| Julie Morgan | Cardiff North | 2011 | Labour | 11 February 2025 |
| Lesley Griffiths | Wrexham | 2007 | Labour | 14 February 2025 |
| John Griffiths | Newport East | 1999 | Labour Co-op | 17 February 2025 |
| Jane Hutt | Vale of Glamorgan | 1999 | Labour | 21 February 2025 |
| Julie James | Swansea West | 2011 | Labour | 21 February 2025 |
| Jenny Rathbone | Cardiff Central | 2011 | Labour | 21 February 2025 |
| Jeremy Miles | Neath | 2016 | Labour Co-op | 19 September 2025 |
| Mark Isherwood | North Wales | 2003 | Conservatives | 26 March 2026 |

== Results ==
2026 Senedd election results
| Party | Votes | % | Seats | +/– |
|---|---|---|---|---|
| Plaid Cymru | 444,665 | 35.41 | 43 | ▲30 |
| Reform UK | 367,985 | 29.30 | 34 | ▲34 |
| Labour (Note: Includes 5 MSs sponsored by the Co-operative Party, who are designated Labour and Co-operative.) | 139,203 | 11.08 | 9 | ▼21 |
| Conservative | 134,926 | 10.74 | 7 | ▼9 |
| Green Party | 84,608 | 6.74 | 2 | ▲2 |
| Liberal Democrats | 56,012 | 4.46 | 1 | Steady |
| Heritage Party | 5,474 | 0.44 | 0 | Steady |
| Propel | 4,032 | 0.32 | 0 | Steady |
| Gwlad | 2,479 | 0.20 | 0 | Steady |
| Open Party | 684 | 0.05 | 0 | Steady |
| Welsh Christian Party | 456 | 0.04 | 0 | Steady |
| Britain's Communist Party | 354 | 0.03 | 0 | Steady |
| Socialist Labour Party | 285 | 0.02 | 0 | Steady |
| Official Monster Raving Loony Party | 279 | 0.02 | 0 | Steady |
| Trade Unionist and Socialist Coalition | 244 | 0.02 | 0 | Steady |
| Social Democratic Party | 165 | 0.01 | 0 | Steady |
| Independents | 14,063 | 1.12 | 0 | Steady |
| Total | 1,255,914 | 100.00 | 96 | ▲36 |
| Registered voters/turnout | 2,433,921 | 51.6 | | |
Source: Sky News BBC

| Constituency | Votes | | | | | | | Members | | | | | |
| Constituency | PC | Reform | Labour | Cons | Green | Lib Dem | Other | 1 | 2 | 3 | 4 | 5 | 6 |
|---|---|---|---|---|---|---|---|---|---|---|---|---|---|
| Afan Ogwr Rhondda | 24,538 | 22,345 | 11,123 | 2,831 | 2,561 | 1,800 | 1,251 | Sera Evans (PC) | Benjamin McKenna (Ref) | Alun Cox (PC) | Steve Bayliss (Ref) | Huw Irranca-Davies (Lab) | Elyn Stephens (PC) |
| Bangor Conwy Môn | 31,057 | 19,440 | 4,448 | 8,555 | 3,101 | 1,591 | 938 | Rhun ap Iorwerth (PC) | Helen Jenner (Ref) | Mair Rowlands (PC) | Elfed Williams (PC) | John Clarke (Ref) | Janet Finch-Saunders (Con) |
| Blaenau Gwent Caerffili Rhymni | 29,314 | 23,955 | 7,739 | 3,353 | 2,447 | 1,284 | 1,741 | Delyth Jewell (PC) | Llŷr Powell (Ref) | Lindsay Whittle (PC) | Catherine Cullen (Ref) | Niamh Salkeld (PC) | Joshua Kim (Ref) |
| Brycheiniog Tawe Nedd | 23,276 | 26,897 | 7,086 | 6,821 | 5,405 | 9,549 | 2,062 | James Evans (Ref) | Sioned Williams (PC) | Iain McIntosh (Ref) | Rebeca Phillips (PC) | Jane Dodds (LD) | David Mills (Ref) |
| Caerdydd Ffynnon Taf | 32,617 | 17,335 | 11,261 | 8,479 | 9,036 | 8,442 | 1,050 | Dafydd Trystan (PC) | Cai Parry-Jones (Ref) | Zaynub Akbar (PC) | Shav Taj (Lab) | Nick Carter (PC) | Paul Rock (Grn) |
| Caerdydd Penarth | 36,136 | 15,525 | 10,907 | 6,818 | 12,113 | 2,260 | 4,294 | Anna Brychan (PC) | Kiera Marshall (PC) | Joseph Martin (Ref) | Anthony Slaughter (Grn) | Leticia Gonzalez (PC) | Huw Thomas (Lab) |
| Casnewydd Islwyn | 23,069 | 25,571 | 10,622 | 8,847 | 5,898 | 2,683 | 1,008 | Dan Thomas (Ref) | Peredur Owen Griffiths (PC) | Art Wright (Ref) | Lyn Ackerman (PC) | Jayne Bryant (Lab) | Natasha Asghar (Con) |
| Ceredigion Penfro | 31,943 | 23,003 | 6,495 | 14,789 | 6,324 | 4,613 | 1,986 | Elin Jones (PC) | Susan Archibald (Ref) | Kerry Ferguson (PC) | Paul Davies (Con) | Paul Marr (Ref) | Anna Nicholl (PC) |
| Clwyd | 22,583 | 25,741 | 8,314 | 16,193 | 4,219 | 2,355 | 352 | Adrian Mason (Ref) | Llyr Gruffydd (PC) | Darren Millar (Con) | Louise Emery (Ref) | Becca Martin (PC) | Thomas Montgomery (Ref) |
| Fflint Wrecsam | 18,440 | 25,349 | 8,555 | 9,017 | 5,138 | 2,647 | 850 | Cristiana Emsley (Ref) | Carrie Harper (PC) | Nigel Williams (Ref) | Marc Jones (PC) | Sam Rowlands (Con) | Ken Skates (Lab) |
| Gwynedd Maldwyn | 36,087 | 22,667 | 4,466 | 5,650 | 4,090 | 4,554 | 4,176 | Siân Gwenllian (PC) | Andrew Griffin (Ref) | Mabon ap Gwynfor (PC) | Beca Brown (PC) | Claire Johnson-Wood (Ref) | Elwyn Vaughan (PC) |
| Gŵyr Abertawe | 25,076 | 21,641 | 11,195 | 7,523 | 6,383 | 6,262 | 642 | Gwyn Williams (PC) | Francesca O'Brien (Ref) | Safa Elhassan (PC) | Mike Hedges (Lab) | Steven Rodaway (Ref) | John Davies (PC) |
| Pen-y-bont Bro Morgannwg | 27,407 | 24,602 | 9,518 | 12,464 | 4,220 | 2,175 | 1,415 | Mark Hooper (PC) | Sarah Cooper-Lesadd (Ref) | Sarah Rees (PC) | Andrew RT Davies (Con) | Gareth Thomas (Ref) | Sarah Murphy (Lab) |
| Pontypridd Cynon Merthyr | 28,687 | 22,217 | 9,344 | 4,339 | 3,466 | 1,393 | 3,182 | Heledd Fychan (PC) | Jason O'Connell (Ref) | Lis McLean (PC) | David Hughes (Ref) | Sara Crowley (PC) | Vikki Howells (Lab) |
| Sir Fynwy Torfaen | 18,275 | 24,155 | 11,672 | 13,394 | 6,375 | 2,742 | 1,093 | Laura Anne Jones (Ref) | Matthew Jones (PC) | Peter Fox (Con) | Stephen Senior (Ref) | Lynne Neagle (Lab) | Donna Cushing (PC) |
| Sir Gaerfyrddin | 36,160 | 27,542 | 6,458 | 5,853 | 3,832 | 1,662 | 2,476 | Cefin Campbell (PC) | Gareth Beer (Ref) | Nerys Evans (PC) | Carmelo Colasanto (Ref) | Adam Price (PC) | Sarah Edwards (Ref) |

=== Members who lost their seats ===
16 incumbents lost their seats:

| MS | Former constituency/region | First elected | Party | Constituency |
|---|---|---|---|---|
| Rhys ab Owen | South Wales Central | 2021 | Independent | Caerdydd Penarth |
| Hannah Blythyn | Delyn | 2016 | Labour Co-op | Clwyd |
| Alun Davies | Blaenau Gwent | 2007 | Labour Co-op | Blaenau Gwent Caerffili Rhymni |
| Gareth Davies | Vale of Clwyd | 2021 | Conservatives | Clwyd |
| Luke Fletcher | South Wales West | 2021 | Plaid Cymru | Pen-y-bont Bro Morgannwg |
| Russell George | Montgomeryshire | 2011 | Independent | Gwynedd Maldwyn |
| Tom Giffard | South Wales West | 2021 | Conservatives | Gŵyr Abertawe |
| Altaf Hussain | South Wales West | 2015 | Conservatives | Pen-y-bont Bro Morgannwg |
| Joel James | South Wales Central | 2021 | Conservatives | Caerdydd Ffynnon Taf |
| Samuel Kurtz | Carmarthen West and South Pembrokeshire | 2021 | Conservatives | Ceredigion Penfro |
| Eluned Morgan | Mid and West Wales | 2016 | Labour | Ceredigion Penfro |
| Rhianon Passmore | Islwyn | 2016 | Labour Co-op | Casnewydd Islwyn |
| David Rees | Aberavon | 2011 | Labour | Afan Ogwr Rhondda |
| Jack Sargeant | Alyn and Deeside | 2018 | Labour | Fflint Wrecsam |
| Carolyn Thomas | North Wales | 2021 | Labour Co-op | Clwyd |
| Buffy Williams | Rhondda | 2021 | Labour | Afan Ogwr Rhondda |

== Aftermath and analysis ==
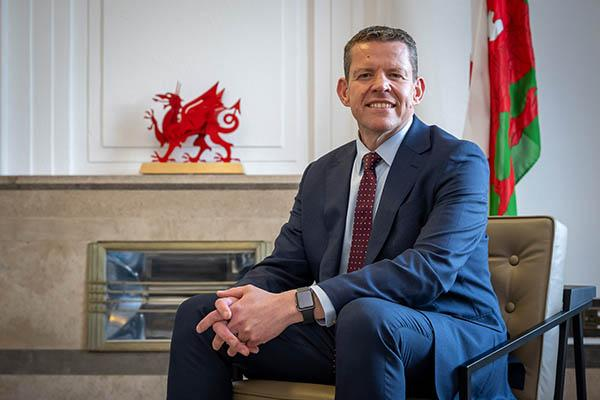
Rhun ap Iorwerth as First Minister of Wales

Eluned Morgan resigned as leader of Welsh Labour after failing to be elected in Ceredigion Penfro. Ken Skates was declared as interim Welsh Labour leader.

Plaid Cymru party leader Rhun ap Iorwerth confirmed his party's intention to form a minority government after it won 43 seats, 6 seats short of a majority. Ap Iowerth said that the party preferred a "cooperative approach" to a coalition.

Elin Jones (Plaid Cymru) and Lynne Neagle (Welsh Labour) became the longest serving members of the Senedd, serving since the Senedd was established in 1999.

On 12 May, the 7th Senedd met. Outgoing Labour deputy first minister Huw Irranca-Davies was elected Llywydd of the Senedd, while Plaid Cymru's Kerry Ferguson was elected deputy Llywydd unopposed. The vote for First Minister saw Rhun ap Iorwerth elected with the support of Plaid Cymru and Greens, while Labour and the Liberal Democrats abstained.

On 13 May, ap Iorwerth appointed ministers for his government.

12 May 2026 7th Senedd Election of First Minister
Senedd
| Choice | Party | Votes |
|---|---|---|
| Rhun ap Iorwerth | Plaid Cymru | 44 / 96 |
| Dan Thomas | Reform UK Wales | 34 / 96 |
| Darren Millar | Welsh Conservatives | 7 / 96 |
| Abstained | | 9 / 96 |

=== Voter demographics ===
==== YouGov ====
Following the election, YouGov published a demographic breakdown of the election results.

Breakdown of vote in Wales into affiliates (%) by demographic
| Category | PC | Ref | Lab | Con | Grn | LD | Others | Margin |
|---|---|---|---|---|---|---|---|---|
| All | 35 | 29 | 11 | 11 | 7 | 5 | 2 | 6 |
Gender
| Female | 38 | 24 | 11 | 12 | 8 | 4 | 2 | 14 |
| Male | 33 | 34 | 11 | 9 | 5 | 5 | 3 | 1 |
Age
| 16–29 | 60 | 14 | 5 | 2 | 15 | 3 | 1 | 45 |
| 30–39 | 46 | 23 | 12 | 7 | 7 | 3 | 2 | 23 |
| 40–49 | 36 | 25 | 12 | 8 | 10 | 6 | 3 | 11 |
| 50–59 | 31 | 34 | 12 | 12 | 5 | 4 | 3 | 3 |
| 60–69 | 28 | 36 | 12 | 13 | 3 | 5 | 2 | 8 |
| 70+ | 22 | 37 | 12 | 18 | 4 | 4 | 3 | 15 |
Women by age
| 16–34 | 67 | 7 | 7 | 2 | 14 | 2 | 0 | 53 |
| 35–49 | 49 | 18 | 12 | 9 | 11 | 5 | 4 | 31 |
| 50–64 | 31 | 33 | 11 | 13 | 6 | 4 | 2 | 2 |
| 65+ | 25 | 32 | 12 | 21 | 3 | 5 | 2 | 7 |
Men by age
| 16–34 | 45 | 26 | 7 | 5 | 10 | 4 | 3 | 19 |
| 35–49 | 38 | 30 | 12 | 6 | 7 | 6 | 2 | 8 |
| 50–64 | 30 | 39 | 11 | 9 | 3 | 5 | 3 | 9 |
| 65+ | 22 | 40 | 14 | 16 | 2 | 3 | 3 | 18 |
Socio-economic Classification
| Higher | 39 | 22 | 13 | 14 | 6 | 4 | 1 | 17 |
| Intermediate | 33 | 31 | 9 | 14 | 7 | 5 | 2 | 2 |
| Routine | 29 | 39 | 12 | 7 | 5 | 4 | 4 | 10 |
Highest educational level
| Low | 26 | 45 | 9 | 8 | 4 | 4 | 3 | 19 |
| Medium | 34 | 31 | 10 | 11 | 7 | 5 | 3 | 3 |
| High | 43 | 17 | 14 | 12 | 8 | 4 | 1 | 26 |
Work status
| Working | 41 | 27 | 10 | 9 | 6 | 4 | 2 | 14 |
| Student | 53 | 6 | 7 | 3 | 25 | 5 | 0 | 28 |
| Retired | 24 | 36 | 13 | 16 | 3 | 5 | 2 | 12 |
| Not working | 33 | 30 | 11 | 7 | 11 | 4 | 4 | 3 |
Household earnings
| Under £25,000 | 31 | 37 | 11 | 8 | 6 | 5 | 3 | 6 |
| £25,000–39,999 | 31 | 30 | 13 | 10 | 9 | 6 | 2 | 1 |
| £40,000–69,999 | 40 | 29 | 12 | 10 | 5 | 3 | 1 | 11 |
| £70,000+ | 44 | 16 | 12 | 15 | 6 | 6 | 1 | 28 |
Household tenure
| Own outright | 27 | 36 | 11 | 15 | 5 | 4 | 2 | 9 |
| Mortgage | 42 | 25 | 11 | 9 | 6 | 5 | 2 | 17 |
| Private rent | 34 | 24 | 14 | 7 | 15 | 4 | 2 | 10 |
| Social rent | 34 | 31 | 12 | 11 | 4 | 3 | 4 | 3 |
| Family or friends | 53 | 18 | 8 | 3 | 11 | 6 | 1 | 35 |
Household earnings
| Under £25,000 | 31 | 37 | 11 | 8 | 6 | 5 | 3 | 6 |
| £25,000–39,999 | 31 | 30 | 13 | 10 | 9 | 6 | 2 | 1 |
| £40,000–69,999 | 40 | 29 | 12 | 10 | 5 | 3 | 1 | 11 |
| £70,000+ | 44 | 16 | 12 | 15 | 6 | 6 | 1 | 27 |
Welsh speaking ability
| Yes, fluently | 69 | 13 | 7 | 7 | 3 | 1 | 1 | 56 |
| Yes, but not fluently | 47 | 21 | 12 | 7 | 7 | 5 | 2 | 26 |
| No | 25 | 36 | 12 | 13 | 7 | 5 | 3 | 11 |
Place of birth
| Wales | 39 | 29 | 12 | 9 | 5 | 3 | 3 | 10 |
| Rest of UK | 28 | 32 | 9 | 15 | 9 | 6 | 1 | 4 |
| Outside UK | 31 | 19 | 14 | 10 | 14 | 9 | 3 | 12 |
By affiliation of constituency vote in 2021 Senedd election
| Conservative | 6 | 56 | 1 | 32 | 0 | 3 | 1 | 24 |
| Labour | 41 | 11 | 32 | 4 | 7 | 2 | 2 | 9 |
| Lib Dem | 23 | 8 | 5 | 3 | 14 | 46 | 1 | 23 |
| Plaid Cymru | 74 | 11 | 4 | 5 | 3 | 3 | 1 | 63 |
By affiliation of regional vote in 2021 Senedd election
| Conservative | 6 | 55 | 1 | 33 | 0 | 3 | 1 | 22 |
| Labour | 39 | 13 | 34 | 4 | 6 | 3 | 2 | 5 |
| Lib Dem | 27 | 6 | 6 | 9 | 9 | 40 | 3 | 13 |
| Plaid Cymru | 76 | 8 | 4 | 6 | 2 | 3 | 0 | 68 |
By affiliation of vote in 2024 United Kingdom general election
| Conservative | 7 | 40 | 2 | 47 | 1 | 1 | 1 | 7 |
| Labour | 45 | 10 | 30 | 2 | 7 | 4 | 2 | 15 |
| Lib Dem | 32 | 11 | 3 | 9 | 7 | 35 | 2 | 3 |
| Plaid Cymru | 79 | 8 | 3 | 3 | 4 | 2 | 1 | 71 |
| Reform UK | 3 | 92 | 1 | 2 | 1 | 0 | 2 | 89 |
By affiliation of vote in 2016 EU membership referendum
| Remain | 48 | 10 | 18 | 9 | 8 | 6 | 1 | 30 |
| Leave | 17 | 53 | 7 | 15 | 2 | 3 | 4 | 36 |

== See also ==
- 2026 Scottish Parliament election
- Next Northern Ireland Assembly election
