= Sarah Rees (politician) =

Welsh politician

Sarah Rees MS
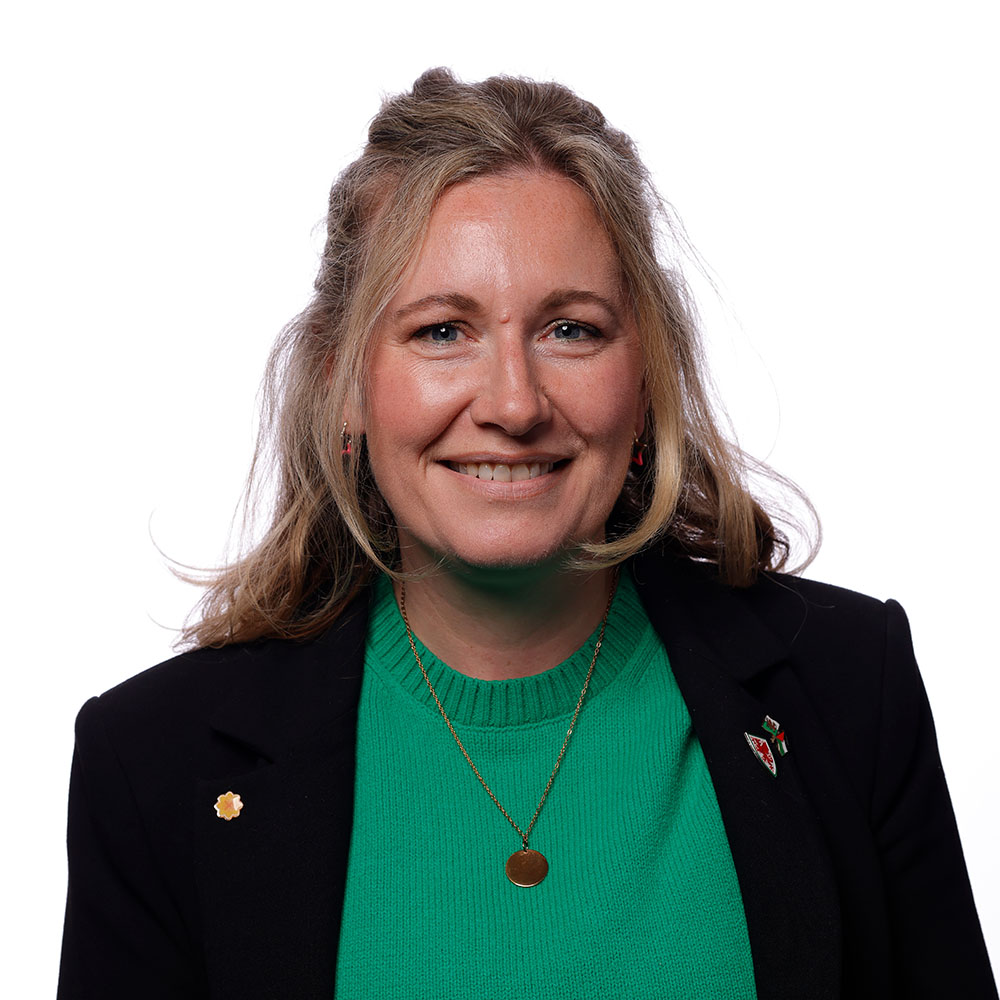
- Official portrait, 2026

Member of the Senedd
- Incumbent
- Assumed office 8 May 2026
- Constituency: Pen-y-bont Bro Morgannwg

Personal details
- Party: Plaid Cymru

Sarah Rees is a Welsh Plaid Cymru politician. She has served as a Member of the Senedd (MS) for Pen-y-bont Bro Morgannwg since 2026.

== Professional career ==
Rees has worked as head of Oxfam Cymru since 2021. She was previously a candidate in the 2016 National Assembly for Wales election with the Women's Equality Party as the top candidate on the party list in the South Wales Central electoral region, and subsequently lost.

Rees previously served as the vice chair of YesCymru, becoming the chair of the organisation after Siôn Jobbins stepped down in July 2021. Rees became the chair during a tumultuous time for YesCymru, with Rees admitting there had been a "slight breakdown in communication" between the committee and members of YesCymru. Later the same month Rees announced that all committee members, including herself, would be stepping down after the committee received a vote of no confidence from regional groups.

== Political career ==
In 2020, Rees served as de facto maternity cover for Plaid Cymru MS Bethan Sayed, before procedures were introduced for this to be formally managed.

Rees contested selection for the Pen-y-bont Bro Morgannwg constituency, alongside Mark Hooper and Luke Fletcher. Rees placed second on the list, as the highest-ranking female candidate on a list employing a gender-zipping mechanism.

In the 2026 Senedd election, Rees was elected as a MS for the Pen-y-bont Bro Morgannwg constituency.

== Personal life ==
In 2018 Rees was made redundant during her maternity leave, but was only made aware after she attempted to return to work. A trustee for the charity informed Rees that the charity was discussing her redundancy without Rees being made aware. Rees considered going to a employment tribunal about the matter, but decided against it as she was unable to afford the costs. Following her redundancy Rees became a supporter of the campaign group Pregnant Then Screwed, leading their first march in 2017 and volunteering on their helpline.
