= Buffy Williams =

Welsh politician (born 1976)

Buffy Williams BEM
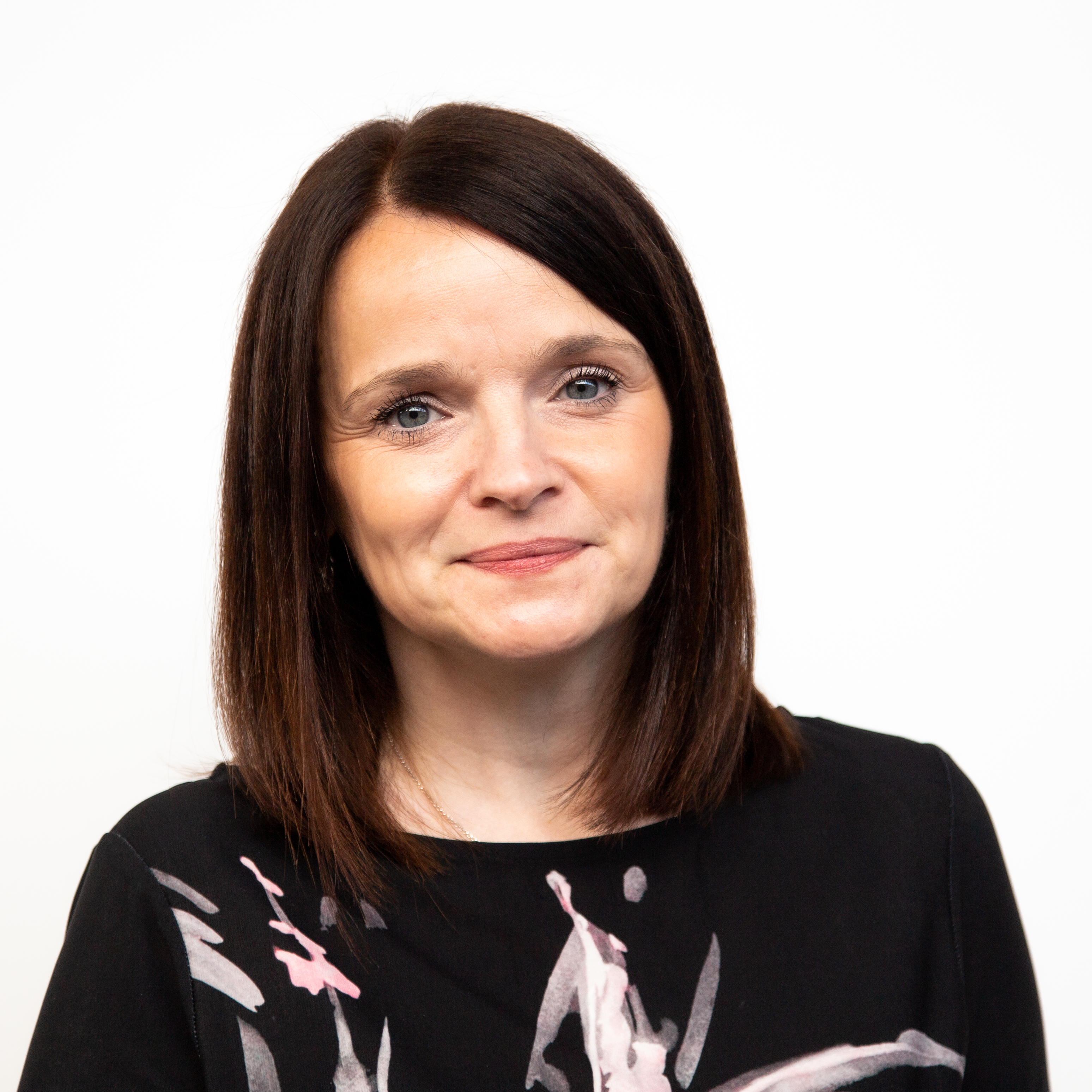
- Williams in 2021

Member of the Senedd for Rhondda
- In office 6 May 2021 – 7 April 2026
- Preceded by: Leanne Wood
- Succeeded by: Constituency abolished

Personal details
- Born: Elizabeth Williams; 1 November 1976 (age 49) Williamstown, Rhondda, Wales
- Party: Welsh Labour

Elizabeth "Buffy" Williams (born 1 November 1976) is a Welsh politician who was the Labour Member of the Senedd for Rhondda until April 2026.

She won the seat from former Plaid Cymru leader Leanne Wood in the 2021 Senedd election before losing her seat in the 2026 Senedd election.

== Early life and career ==
Williams was born and brought up in the Rhondda community of Williamstown, Rhondda Cynon Taf, the daughter of a trade union activist. She left school at the age of sixteen to work in a factory, but continued studying.

Williams is the manager of a community centre, and worked for more than 20 years in the third sector, having set up Canolfan Pentre. Other campaigns she has been involved with include saving the local A&E in the Royal Glamorgan Hospital from a closure proposed by her own party, and helping in response to the floods caused by Storm Dennis.

In March 2021, the Labour Party was criticised for nominating Williams for a Welsh Government award, the St David Awards, after she had been selected as a candidate for the Senedd elections. The Welsh Conservatives asked whether it was appropriate "for the first minister to be seen to be using the prestigious St David Awards to reward his Labour election candidates."

Williams won the Rhondda constituency seat on 6 May 2021 from the former Plaid Cymru leader, Leanne Wood, with a majority of 5,497.

In February 2025 during a trial at Merthyr Tydfil, it emerged that a member of staff from Williams’ office had made a complaint to the Police that resulted in a former Royal Marine Commando, Jamie Michael, being charged and prosecuted for inciting racial hatred. The complaint related to a Facebook video he had posted in the aftermath of the 2024 Southport stabbings, in which he stated "we are under attack" from illegal migrants. He referred to "psychopaths" and "scumbags", whom his lawyer said was only a reference to criminal migrants. He was acquitted unanimously in under an hour. In the aftermath, Williams received significant online abuse.

In the 2026 Senedd election, she was a candidate in the Afan Ogwr Rhondda constituency and second on the party list. Under the D'Hondt method she failed to be re-elected.

== Personal life ==
She is married with three children and lives in Pentre, the Rhondda.
