= Marc Jones (Welsh politician) =

Welsh politician

Marc Jones MS
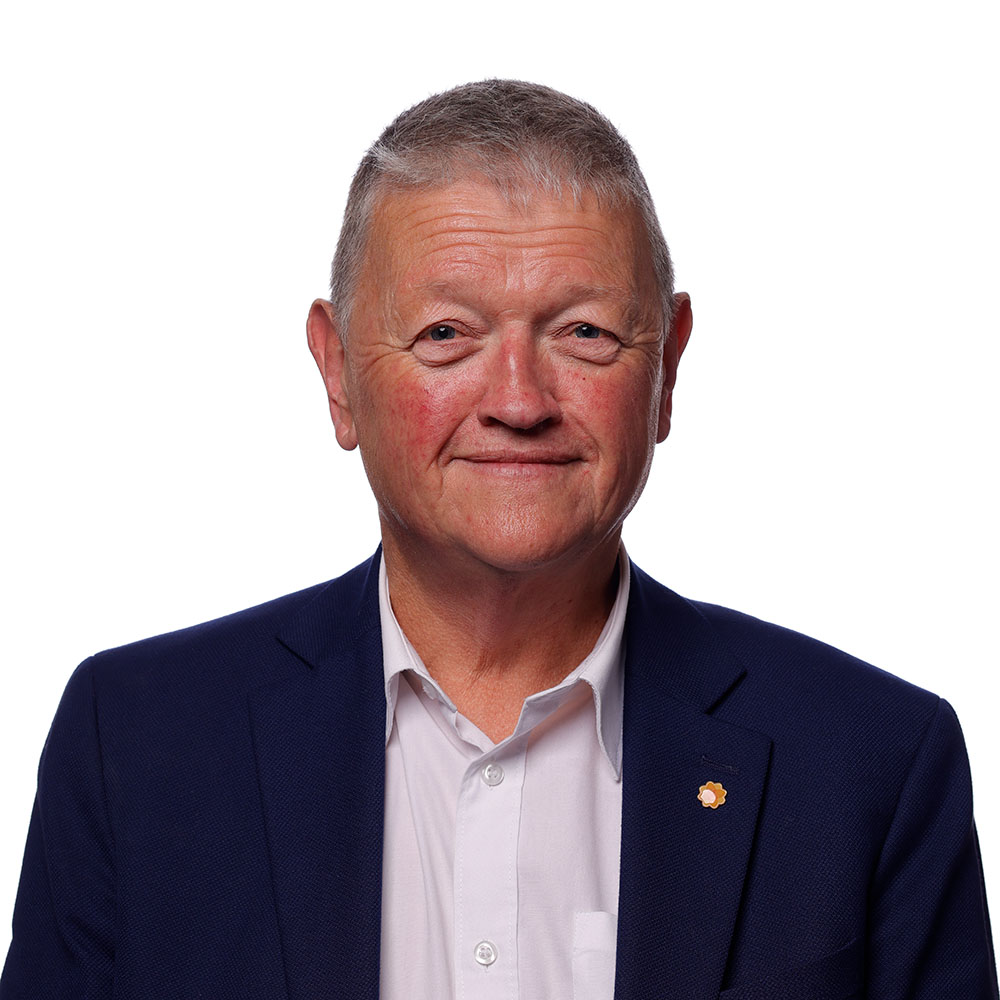
- Official portrait, 2026

Member of the Senedd
- Incumbent
- Assumed office 8 May 2026
- Constituency: Fflint Wrecsam

Personal details
- Party: Plaid Cymru

Marc Jones is a Welsh Plaid Cymru politician, who has served as a Member of the Senedd (MS) for Fflint Wrecsam since 2026.

== Political career ==
Marc Jones is chairman of Plaid Cymru. He is a member of Wrexham County Borough Council. Jones also previously competed with the Plaid in the 2014 European Parliament election in the United Kingdom, having been the party's second candidate on the party list. Jones failed to win a seat in that election. He also competed for the Plaid in the 2015 United Kingdom general election for the Clwyd West constituency, coming in 4th place with 4,651 votes.

In the 2026 Senedd election, Jones was elected as a MS for the Fflint Wrecsam constituency.
