= Carrie Harper =

Welsh politician

Carrie Harper MS
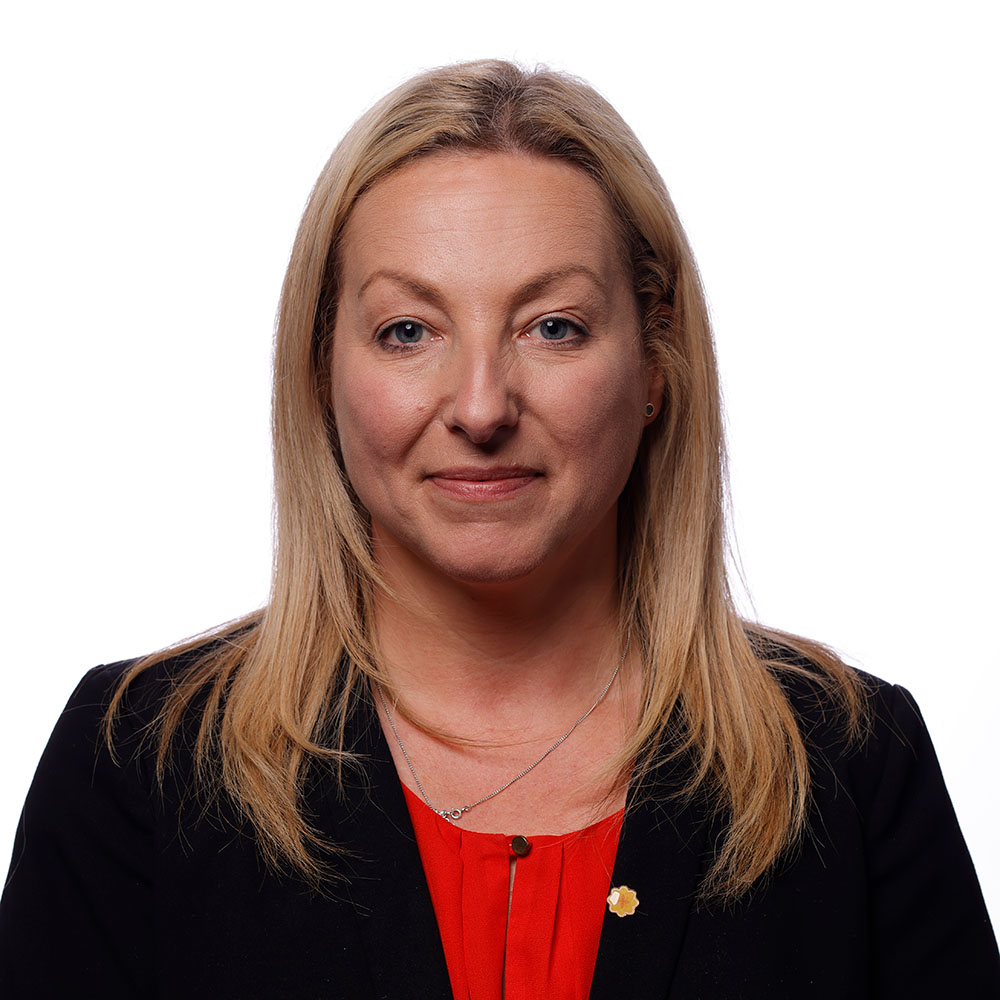
- Official portrait, 2026

Member of the Senedd
- Incumbent
- Assumed office 8 May 2026
- Constituency: Fflint Wrecsam

Wrexham County Borough Councillor for Queensway Ward
- In office 8 May 2017 – 9 May 2026
- Preceded by: Colin Powell
- In office 5 May 2008 – 3 May 2012
- Preceded by: Colin Powell
- Succeeded by: Colin Powell

Carrie Harper is a Welsh Plaid Cymru politician, who has served as a Member of the Senedd (MS) for Fflint Wrecsam since May 2026. She previously represented the Queensway ward on Wrexham County Borough Council from 2008 to 2012 and from 2017 to 2026, and was the deputy leader of Plaid Cymru's group on the council.

== Biography ==
Harper is from Caia Park, Wrexham. She attended Yale College and the North East Wales Institute of Higher Education (NEWI, now Wrexham University). She has previously worked in the health and fitness sector, and in hospitality. She has two children.

== Political career ==
Harper was the regional North East Wales spokesperson for Cymuned, a Welsh nationalist campaign group in the 2000s. In 2007, she was involved in the organisation's campaign to oppose National Trust plans for a high-priced housing development near the village of Rhostyllen.

Harper was first elected to Wrexham County Borough Council in the 2008 local elections, gaining the Queensway seat from the Welsh Labour candidate Colin Powell by 5 votes, with Harper receiving 155 votes and Powell receiving 150. In 2012, Harper lost the seat to Powell by a margin of 2 votes, with Powell receiving 198 and Harper receiving 196. At the 2017 local elections, Harper recaptured the seat with a much larger majority of 46 votes.

Harper has run in numerous elections to both the UK Parliament and the Senedd. She ran to represent Wrexham in the UK Parliament at the 2015, 2017, and 2019 general elections. She was not elected at any of these elections.

Harper also contested the 2018 Alyn and Deeside by-election, held after the death of incumbent member Carl Sargeant, coming 4th and receiving 5.7% of the vote.

Harper ran for the Wrexham constituency at the 2021 Senedd election. She came third, receiving 21% of the vote. During the campaign, Harper was criticised for a social media post using the slogan "Don't want a Tory for a neighbour? Vote Plaid Cymru, not Labour". This slogan was criticised for its similarity to a racist slogan used in Smethwick during the 1964 general election. Harper apologised for the advert.

In the 2026 Senedd election, Harper was elected as a MS for the Fflint Wrecsam constituency.
