= Fflint Wrecsam =

Senedd constituency (from 2026)

- County multi-member constituency for the Senedd
- Boundary of Fflint Wrecsam in Wales
- Principal areas: Flintshire; Wrexham County Borough
- Preserved county: Clwyd
- Population: 204,672 (2024)
- Major settlements: Buckley, Connah's Quay, Flint, Overton, Shotton, Wrexham

Current County multi-member constituency
- Created: 2026
- Seats: 6
- Created from: UK Parliament boundaries: Alyn and Deeside; Wrexham; Previous Senedd constituencies: Alyn and Deeside; Clwyd South; Delyn; Wrexham; Previous Senedd region: North Wales

Fflint Wrecsam (Welsh for 'Flint [and] Wrexham';) is a six-member constituency of the Senedd (Welsh Parliament; Welsh: Senedd Cymru) used in the 2026 Senedd election. It covers eastern Flintshire and the north and east of Wrexham County Borough, both in North Wales.

It was proposed following the 2026 review of Senedd constituencies, and is a pairing of the two UK Parliament constituencies of Alyn and Deeside and Wrexham. It has a Welsh-only name.

== Boundaries ==
The constituency covers eastern Flintshire, including Flint and Connah's Quay. It also includes the north and east of Wrexham County Borough, including Wrexham itself.

A Senedd constituency comprising the boundaries of the UK Parliament constituencies of Alyn and Deeside and Wrexham, has been proposed by the Democracy and Boundary Commission Cymru for the 2026 election to the Senedd (Welsh Parliament; Senedd Cymru). It was initially proposed using the English name Alyn, Deeside and Wrexham in September 2024, but was renamed to Fflint Wrecsam in December proposals with most constituencies using Welsh-only names. The Welsh-only name and boundaries were confirmed in the commission's final recommendations in March 2025. When announcing their candidates, Reform UK used "Alyn and Deeside, Wrexham" instead, using the English names for the pair of UK Parliament constituencies that form it.

The constituency was established in 2026, following the passing of the Senedd Cymru (Members and Elections) Act 2024. The act legislates electoral reform of the Senedd to create 16 larger "super constituencies", pairing the 32 UK Parliament constituencies in Wales, and using a new fully proportional voting system, with each constituency electing six Members of the Senedd (MSs) rather than one previously.

== Members of the Senedd ==
Term	Election	Distribution	MS	MS	MS	MS	MS	MS
7th	2026	2 / 1 / 1 / 2	Cristiana Emsley (Ref)	Carrie Harper (PC)	Nigel Williams (Ref)	Marc Jones (PC)	Sam Rowlands (Con)	Ken Skates (Lab)

== Elections ==
=== Elections in the 2020s ===
2026 Senedd election: Fflint Wrecsam
Party	Candidate	Votes	%	±%
Reform	Cristiana Emsley [E) Nigel Williams (E) William Paul Ashton Helen Brown Michael Budden David William Vernon	25,349	36.2	▲35.2
Plaid Cymru	Carrie Harper (E) Marc Jones (E) Kayleigh Unitt Dean Davies Annette Davies Andy Gallanders	18,440	26.3	▲11.4
Conservative	Sam Rowlands (E) Jeremy Kent James Ecroyd Kathy Cracknell Alex Rooney Lewis Norton	9,017	12.9	▼19.3
Labour	Ken Skates (E) Jack Sargeant Corin Jarvis Norma Ann Davies George Stephen Thomas Tracey Jane Sutton-Postlewaite	8,555	12.2	▼24.6
Green	Lee Lavery Seki Tabasuares Graham Bannister-Kelly Suzanne Glascott Kathryn Price Helen Mitchell	5,138	7.3	▲4.6
Liberal Democrats	Tim Sly Richard Marbrow Heather Prydderch Lionel Prouve Carole O'Toole Graham Kelly Mike Edwards	2,647	3.8	▼0.3
Independent	Andrew Williams (Note: was a member of Reform UK on registration of candidacy date)	429	0.6	New
Heritage	Kristina Renshaw	256	0.4	New
SDP	Daniel McNay	165	0.2	New
Majority		6,909	9.9	New
Turnout		70,167	45.5	▲4.2
Registered electors		153,885		
Reform win (new seat)				

2021 notional result (Note: Estimate of the 2021 Senedd election result as if the revised boundaries recommended under the 2026 boundary review were in place)
Party	Vote	%	Seats
Labour	28,153	43.9	3
Conservative	20,410	31.9	2
Plaid Cymru	8,807	13.7	1
Liberal Democrats	2,878	4.5	0
UKIP	1,680	2.6	0
Abolish	1,025	1.6	0
Reform UK	765	1.2	0
Freedom Alliance	208	0.3	0
Gwlad	136	0.2	0
