= Nigel Williams (politician) =

Welsh politician

Nigel Williams MS
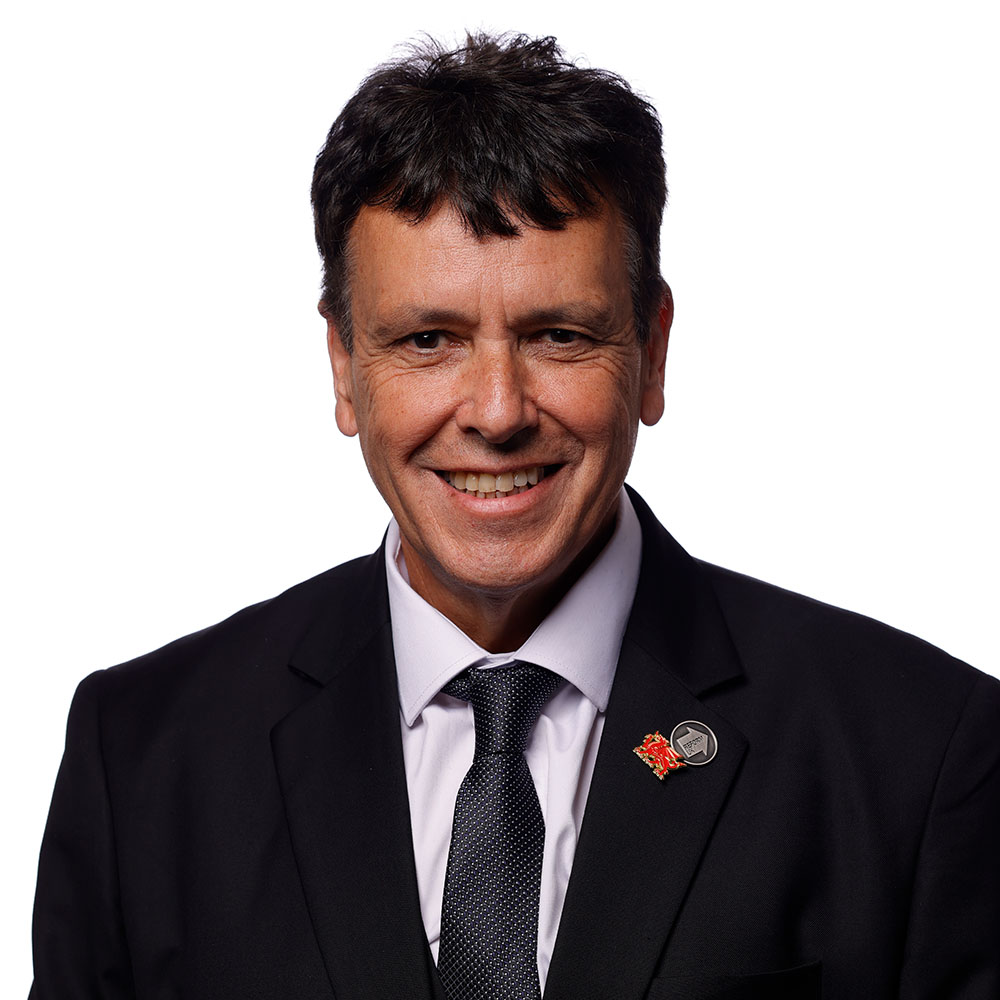
- Official portrait, 2026

Member of the Senedd for Fflint Wrecsam
- Incumbent
- Assumed office 8 May 2026
- Preceded by: Seat established

Personal details
- Party: Reform UK (2019-present)
- Other political affiliations: UKIP (before 2019)

Nigel Williams is a Welsh politician for Reform UK Wales. He has served as Member of the Senedd for the Fflint Wrecsam constituency since May 2026.

== Biography ==
Williams grew up in Flint and attended Flint Gwynedd and Flint High schools. Williams has worked as a schoolteacher, the police and for the National Health Service. He was the UKIP candidate for Delyn at the 2016 National Assembly for Wales election and was subsequently employed by Michelle Brown AM. He was elected in the 2026 Senedd election.

== See also ==
- 7th Senedd
