= Cristiana Emsley =

Welsh politician

Cristiana Emsley MS
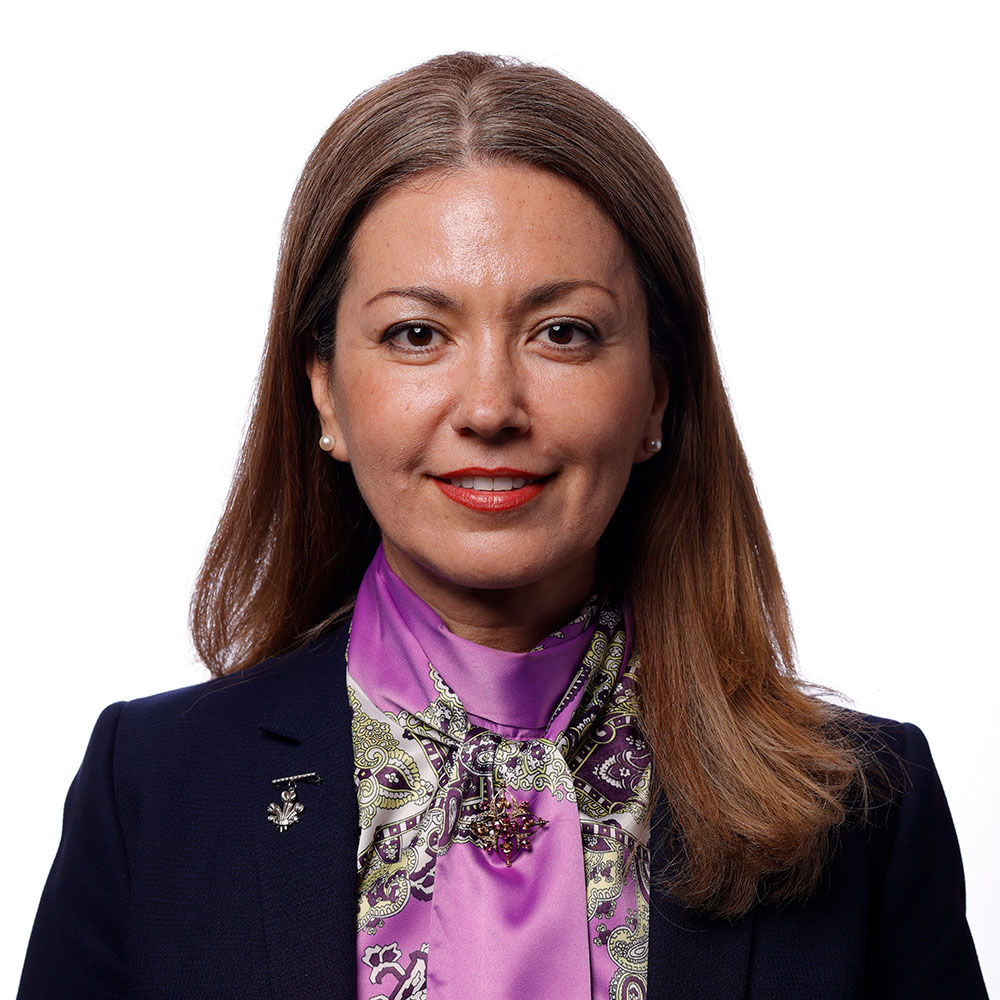
- Official portrait, 2026

Member of the Senedd for Fflint Wrecsam
- Incumbent
- Assumed office 8 May 2026

Personal details
- Born: Romania
- Party: Reform UK

Cristiana Emsley is a Romanian-born Welsh politician serving as a Member of the Senedd (MS) for Fflint Wrecsam since 2026, representing Reform UK.

== Biography ==
Emsley was born and raised in Romania while the country was under communist rule. She was a police detective in Bucharest as well as a police advisor in North Macedonia following the Yugoslav Wars before moving to the UK.

Emsley was Cleveland Police's first civilian Director of Standards and Ethics before being suspended in July 2020 for misconduct. Emsley later began an employment tribunal case against Cleveland Police but the outcome is not a matter of public record. It is believed she obtained a £220,000 settlement from Cleveland Police.
