= Rob Roberts (politician) =

British Independent politician

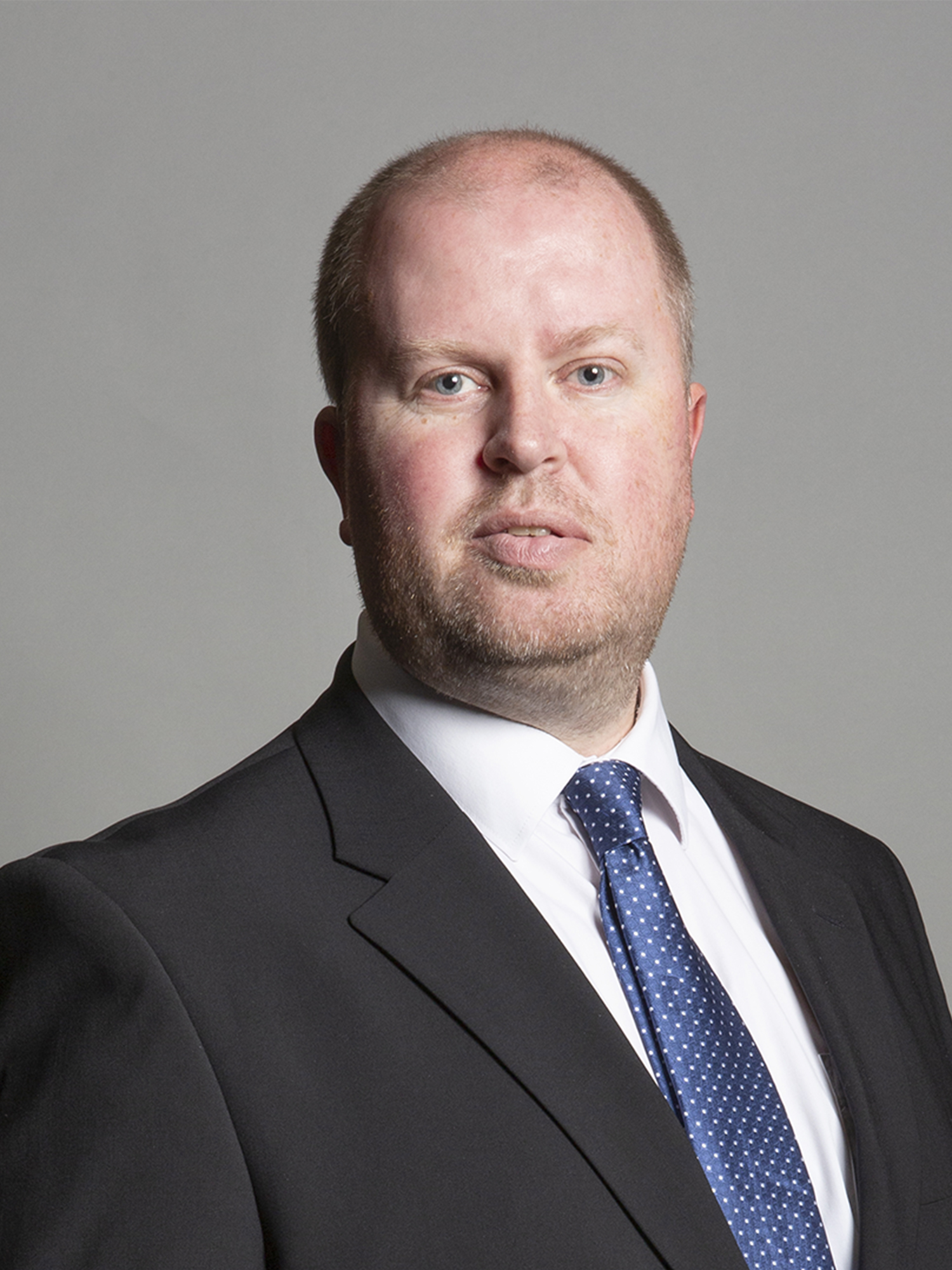
- Official portrait, 2020

Member of Parliament for Delyn
- In office 12 December 2019 – 30 May 2024
- Preceded by: David Hanson
- Succeeded by: Constituency abolished

Personal details
- Born: 15 October 1979 (age 46) Flintshire, Wales
- Party: Independent
- Other political affiliations: Conservative (until 2021)
- Occupation: Former politician
- Profession: Former financial planner
- Website: www.rjroberts.co.uk

Robert Joseph Roberts (born 15 October 1979) is a British former politician who was Member of Parliament for Delyn from 2019 to 2024.

Elected as a member of the Conservative Party, Roberts had the whip removed in July 2020, following allegations of sexual misconduct, and served as an independent until 2024.

Roberts stood for the successor constituency of Clwyd East at the 2024 general election as an independent, but failed to win the seat and lost his deposit.

== Early life and education ==
Roberts grew up in Northop Hall, a large village near the town of Mold, Flintshire. He attended Ysgol Maes Garmon school in Mold and is a fluent Welsh speaker. Prior to being elected to Parliament, Roberts was a financial planner, working in the industry since 2003.

== Parliamentary career ==
Roberts defeated the incumbent Labour MP David Hanson at the 2019 general election. From 2 March 2020, Roberts has been a member of the Welsh Affairs Select Committee to 30 May 2024 and the Procedure Committee from 2 March 2020 to 3 November 2020.

== Sexual misconduct allegations ==
On 21 July 2020, BBC Wales published text messages attributed to Roberts and sent to a female junior member of parliamentary staff in April 2020. The text messages to the staff member suggested that she "fool around with no strings". Roberts told her he "might be gay but I enjoy … fun times". The text messages continued after the intern reported struggling with her mental health. Roberts apologised for his behaviour.

Roberts was referred to Parliament's Independent Complaints and Grievance Scheme (ICGS) in 2020 over allegations of misconduct that resulted in one of the interns being transferred to a different department. In April 2021 the Conservative Party announced that Roberts had been "strongly rebuked", but would not lose the whip. Roberts was instructed to undertake safeguarding and social media protection training.

Roberts apologised after another incident when he sought to engage in an improper relationship with a member of his staff. Roberts reportedly asked a male parliamentary member of staff out to dinner, which the man said had made him feel uncomfortable.

On 25 May 2021 the Independent Expert Panel, after considering the report from the ICGS, recommended that Roberts should be suspended from parliament for six weeks after it found he breached Parliament's sexual misconduct policy. He subsequently lost the Conservative whip and had his membership of the Conservative Party suspended. His six-week parliamentary suspension was confirmed on 27 May, and subsequently Jacob Rees-Mogg and Keir Starmer both called for his resignation. Not long afterwards, the Communities Secretary, Robert Jenrick, called for Roberts to resign his seat.

After his parliamentary suspension expired, Roberts returned to the Commons in July 2021, amid criticism from both Labour and Conservative sources. He was readmitted to the Conservative Party as a member in October 2021, but was denied membership of the Parliamentary Party and was required to sit as an independent until the end of his term.

== 2024 general election ==
He contested and lost the 2024 United Kingdom general election as an Independent candidate in the new constituency of Clwyd East, coming last with 599 votes.

== Personal life ==
Roberts announced via a number of Tweets in May 2020 that he is gay. According to The Independent, he has separated from his wife Alexandra and re-married in December 2023.

== Electoral history ==
General election 2024: Clwyd East
Party	Candidate	Votes	%	±%
Labour	Becky Gittins	18,484	38.7	N/A
Conservative	James Davies	13,862	29	N/A
Reform	Kirsty Walmsley	7,626	15.9	N/A
Plaid Cymru	Paul Penlington	3,733	7.8	N/A
Liberal Democrats	Alec Dauncey	1,859	3.9	N/A
Green	Lee Lavery	1,659	3.5	N/A
Independent	Rob Roberts	599	1.3	N/A
Majority		4,622	9.7	N/A
Turnout		47,822	62.4	N/A
Registered electors		76,150		
Labour win (new seat)				

General election 2019: Delyn
Party	Candidate	Votes	%	±%
Conservative	Rob Roberts	16,756	43.7	+2.6
Labour	David Hanson	15,891	41.4	−10.8
Liberal Democrats	Andrew Parkhurst	2,346	6.1	+3.5
Brexit Party	Nigel Williams	1,971	5.1	+5.1
Plaid Cymru	Paul Rowlinson	1,406	3.7	−0.1
Rejected ballots		105		
Majority		865	2.3	N/A
Turnout		38,370	70.3	−2.5
Registered electors		54,552		
Conservative gain from Labour		Swing	+6.7%	

Parliament of the United Kingdom
Preceded by David Hanson	Member of Parliament for Delyn; 2019–2024	Constituency abolished
