= John Summers High School =

Location
- Chester Road West; Queensferry, Flintshire, CH5 1SE; Wales
- Coordinates: 53.2063°N 3.0307°W

Information
- Former name: Deeside High School
- Type: Comprehensive secondary school
- Closed: 20 July 2017
- Local authority: Flintshire County Council
- Department for Education URN: 401706 Tables
- Head teacher: Paula Stanford
- Gender: Mixed
- Age range: 11–18
- Language: English
- Website: www.jshs.flintshire.sch.uk (inactive)

John Summers High School (formerly Deeside High School) was an 11–18 mixed, English-medium, secondary school and sixth form in Queensferry, Flintshire, Wales. It closed on 20 July 2017.

Its sixth form education was provided through the Deeside Consortium, a group of three local high schools and the nearby sixth form college although Deeside College has now withdrawn from this consortium.
