= Andrew Arbuckle =

Andrew Arbuckle may refer to:

- Andrew Arbuckle (politician) (1944–2025), Scottish politician
- Andrew Arbuckle (actor) (1887–1938), American stage and film actor
