= David Hanson, Baron Hanson of Flint =

British politician (born 1957)

The Right Honourable The Lord Hanson of Flint PC
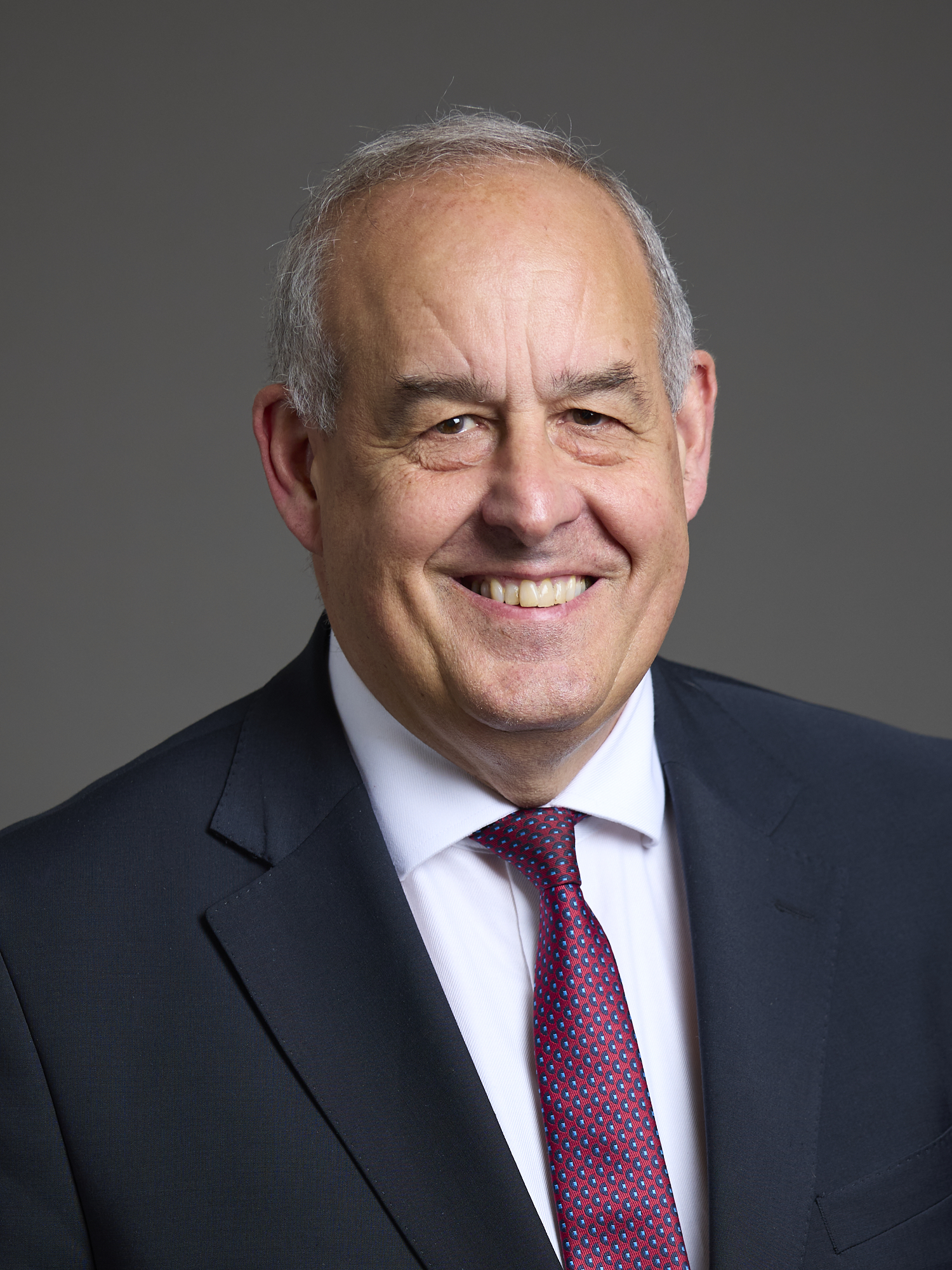
- Official portrait, 2024

Minister of State for Home Office Affairs and Corporate Governance
- Incumbent
- Assumed office 9 July 2024
- Prime Minister: Keir Starmer; Andy Burnham
- Preceded by: The Lord Sharpe of Epsom (Parliamentary Under-Secretary of State for the Home Department)

Minister of State for Security, Counter-Terrorism, Crime and Policing
- In office 8 June 2009 – 11 May 2010
- Prime Minister: Gordon Brown
- Preceded by: Vernon Coaker
- Succeeded by: Nick Herbert

Minister of State for Justice
- In office 9 May 2007 – 9 June 2009
- Prime Minister: Tony Blair; Gordon Brown
- Preceded by: Office established
- Succeeded by: Maria Eagle

Minister of State for Northern Ireland
- In office 11 May 2005 – 8 May 2007
- Prime Minister: Tony Blair
- Preceded by: John Spellar
- Succeeded by: Paul Goggins

Parliamentary Private Secretary to the Prime Minister
- In office 8 June 2001 – 6 May 2005
- Prime Minister: Tony Blair
- Preceded by: Bruce Grocott
- Succeeded by: Keith Hill

Parliamentary Under-Secretary of State for Wales
- In office 29 July 1999 – 7 June 2001
- Prime Minister: Tony Blair
- Preceded by: Peter Hain; Jon Owen Jones
- Succeeded by: Don Touhig
Shadow portfolios
Shadow Minister for Immigration
In office 7 October 2011 – 13 September 2015
Leader	Ed Miliband; Harriet Harman
Preceded by	Gerry Sutcliffe
Succeeded by	Keir Starmer
Shadow Economic Secretary to the Treasury
In office 8 October 2010 – 7 October 2011
Leader	Ed Miliband
Preceded by	Position established
Succeeded by	Cathy Jamieson
Shadow Minister for Security
In office 12 May 2010 – 8 October 2010
Leader	Harriet Harman (acting)
Preceded by	Crispin Blunt
Succeeded by	Gloria De Piero
Shadow Minister for Foreign and Commonwealth Affairs
In office 18 September 2015 – 28 October 2015
Leader	Jeremy Corbyn
Preceded by	Position established
Succeeded by	Diana Johnson

Member of the House of Lords
- Lord Temporal
- Life peerage 19 July 2024

Member of Parliament for Delyn
- In office 9 April 1992 – 6 November 2019
- Preceded by: Keith Raffan
- Succeeded by: Rob Roberts

Personal details
- Born: 5 July 1957 (age 69) Liverpool, England
- Party: Labour
- Spouse: Margaret Hanson
- Children: 4
- Education: University of Hull

David George Hanson, Baron Hanson of Flint (born 5 July 1957), is a British politician who has served as Minister of State for the Home Office since July 2024. He previously served as the member of Parliament (MP) for Delyn from 1992 to 2019. He held several ministerial offices in the Blair and Brown governments, serving in the Home Office, the Ministry of Justice, the Wales Office, the Northern Ireland Office and the Whips' Office. Hanson sat on Ed Miliband's opposition front bench as a shadow treasury minister, and later the shadow immigration minister.

== Early life ==
Hanson was born in Liverpool, Lancashire, to Brian Hanson, a forklift truck driver, and Glenda Hanson, a personnel records clerk. He has a younger sister named Helen. Hanson was educated at Roscoe Primary School in Liverpool, Grange Primary School and Verdin County Comprehensive School in Winsford, Cheshire, and the University of Hull, where he received a BA in 1978 and a CertEd in 1980. Whilst in Hull, he was the vice president of the university students' union and a member of Hull University Labour Club.

He began his career with the Cooperative Society in 1980 as a trainee manager, becoming a manager in Plymouth in 1981. He worked for the Spastics Society, now Scope, from 1982 until 1989, when he was appointed as a director at the Society for the Prevention of Solvent Abuse.

== Political career ==
=== Local politics (1983–1992) ===
Hanson was elected as a councillor to the Vale Royal Borough Council in 1983, serving as the Labour group and council leader from 1989 until 1991, when he stood down to stand in Delyn at the 1992 general election. He was also elected as a councillor to the Northwich Town Council in 1987 and also led the Labour group there in 1989 for a year, leaving the Town Council in 1991.

He unsuccessfully contested Eddisbury at the 1983 general election where he was defeated by the sitting Conservative MP Alastair Goodlad by 14,846 votes. In 1984 he contested the West Cheshire seat for the European Parliament but was again unsuccessful. He contested Delyn in Wales at the 1987 general election but was defeated by the Tory Keith Raffan by 1,224 votes.

=== Member of Parliament (1992–2019) ===
==== First steps (1992–1997) ====
It proved third time lucky for Hanson when he was elected to the House of Commons at the 1992 general election when, following Raffan's retirement, he won the Clwyd seat at Delyn by 2,039. He made his maiden speech on 6 May 1992.

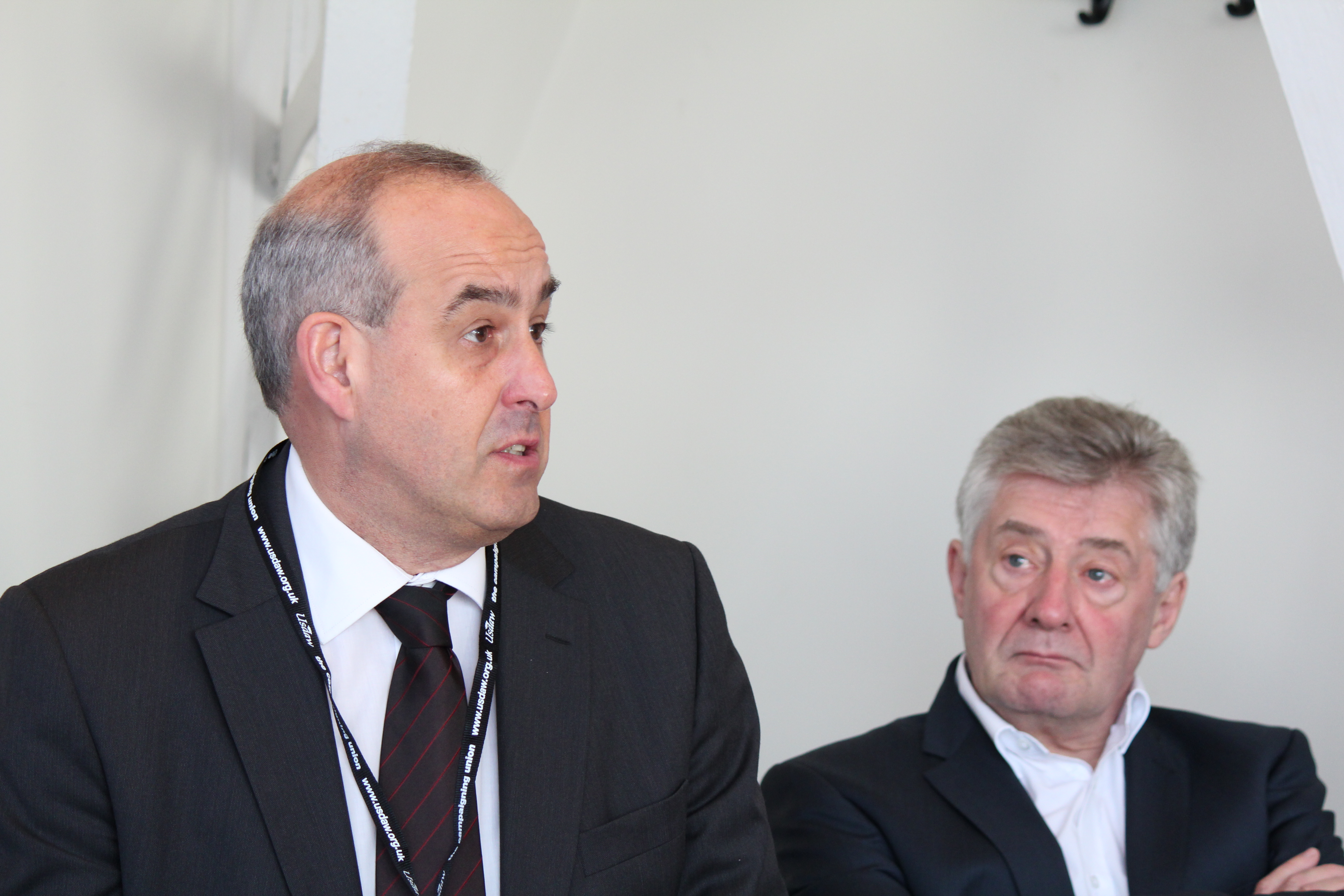
Hanson (left) and Tony Lloyd speaking to Policy Exchange in 2013

In the Commons he was a member of the Welsh affairs select committee from 1992 until he joined the public accounts committee in 1996.

==== Blair and Brown years (1997–2010) ====
Hanson became the Parliamentary Private Secretary PPS to the Chief Secretary to the Treasury Alistair Darling in 1997.

Hanson became a member of the Tony Blair government in the latter's first reshuffle in 1998 when he was appointed as an Assistant Government Whip. He was promoted in 1999 on his appointment as the Parliamentary Under-Secretary of State at the Wales Office.

Following the 2001 general election he became the PPS to Prime Minister Tony Blair.

Hanson served as the Minister of State at the Northern Ireland Office from the 2005 general election until 8 May 2007, when the Northern Ireland Assembly was restored after its period of suspension.

On 21 February 2007, his appointment to the Privy Council was announced.

Blair appointed Hanson to Minister of State at the new Ministry of Justice from 9 May 2007; he remained in that position until 8 June 2009. It was during this time that Hanson introduced the offence to the Public Order Act 1986 Part 3A section 29AB: To stir up hatred on the grounds of sexual orientation, in the Criminal Justice and Immigration Act 2008.

Gordon Brown appointed Hanson as Minister of State for Security, Counter-Terrorism, Crime and Policing at the Home Office from 8 June 2009, until the loss of the 2010 general election exited Labour from government.

==== Out of government (2010–2019) ====
Hanson then shadowed his last role in government, and after the Labour leadership election was appointed Shadow Economic Secretary to the Treasury.

In September 2011 he contributed to the book What Next for Labour? Ideas for a new Generation, with a piece entitled "What Awaits Labour in 2015?"

Hanson lost his seat in the 2019 general election to Rob Roberts, the Conservative Party candidate.

He was knighted in the 2020 Birthday Honours for political service.

=== Life Peerage (2024–present) ===
On 9 July 2024, Hanson was appointed as a minister of state in the Home Office by Prime Minister Sir Keir Starmer. Hanson was nominated for a life peerage and was created Baron Hanson of Flint, of Flint in the County of Flintshire, on 19 July. He was introduced to the House of Lords on 23 July 2024.

In July 2026, he was reappointed to the new government as Minister of State at the Home Office by Andy Burnham.

== Personal life ==
He married Margaret Rose Mitchell, who has also been a politician in Vale Royal. She was narrowly defeated at the 1999 Eddisbury by-election, the same constituency he himself had fought in 1983. They have a son and three daughters.

Parliament of the United Kingdom
Preceded by Keith Raffan	Member of Parliament for Delyn; 1992–2019	Succeeded by Rob Roberts
Orders of precedence in the United Kingdom
Preceded by The Lord Hermer	Gentlemen; Baron Hanson of Flint	Followed by The Lord Spellar
