= 1987 Liverpool City Council election =

1987 UK local government election

← 1986	7 May 1987	1988 →

59 seats were up for election (one third): one seat for each of the 33 wards, plus 26 by-election seats. 50 seats needed for a majority

Elections to Liverpool City Council were held on 7 May 1987. One third of the council was up for election on ordinary rotation; in addition there were extra vacancies in many wards caused by the disqualification of those Labour councillors who were surcharged and banned from office as part of a protest against rate-capping. As a result, the 33 wards elected a total of 59 councillors. Prior to the election the disqualification of a large part of the Labour group meant that there was a temporary administration headed by Trevor Jones of the Liberal/SDP Alliance. As a result of the election, the Labour Party regained overall control of the council, and Harry Rimmer became council leader.

== Summary ==
After the election, the composition of the council was:

Party	Seats	±
Labour	51	+22
SDP-Liberal Alliance	44	+7
Conservative	4	−3

== Election result ==
Liverpool local election result 1987
Party	Seats	Gains	Losses	Net gain/loss	Seats %	Votes %	Votes	+/−
Labour	43							
Alliance	16							
Conservative	0							
Green	0							
Communist	0							
Others	0							

== Ward results ==
=== Abercromby ===
Abercromby 3 seats
Party	Candidate	Votes	%	±%
Labour	Alan W. Dean	2,260	71%	
Labour	K. Hackett	2,225	69%	
Labour	K. Feintuck	2,221	69%	
Liberal	Annette Butler	609	19%	
Liberal	W. M. Bullock	545	17%	
Liberal	K. D. Kelbrick	545	17%	
Communist	F. Carroll	227	7%	
Conservative	G. A. Earle	173	5%	
Conservative	E. B. Steadman	138	4%	
Conservative	G. A. H. Tann	130	4%	
Majority		1,651		
Registered electors		7,646		
Turnout		3,269	41.5%	

=== Aigburth ===
Aigburth
Party	Candidate	Votes	%	±%
Liberal	Sir Trevor Jones	4,074	59%	
Labour	K. F. Taft	1,988	29%	
Conservative	Olga Hughes	599	9%	
Green	Helen Prescott	239	3%	
Majority		2,086		
Registered electors		13,487		
Turnout		6,900	51.2%	

=== Allerton ===
Allerton
Party	Candidate	Votes	%	±%
SDP	Frank S. Roderick	4,147	57%	
Labour	Peter Kilfoyle	1,552	21%	
Conservative	M. Kingston	1,450	20%	
Green	R. E. Cantwell	102	1%	
Majority		2,595		
Registered electors		12,344		
Turnout		7,251	58.7%	

=== Anfield ===
Anfield 2 seats
Party	Candidate	Votes	%	±%
Labour	Jacqueline Smith	2,931	44%	
Liberal	R. Jump	2,884	43%	
Liberal	T. S. Newall	2,772	42%	
Labour	R. M. Kennedy	2,739	41%	
Conservative	Myra Fitzsimmons	712	11%	
Conservative	J. H. Brash	557	8%	
Green	W. Winn	131	2%	
Majority				
Registered electors		12,278		
Turnout		6,658	53.0%	

=== Arundel ===
Arundel
Party	Candidate	Votes	%	±%
Liberal	Roger Johnston	2,709	52%	
Labour	D. J. Bermingham	1,948	37%	
Conservative	D. W. Patmore	398	8%	
Green	G. Thompson	182	3%	
Majority		761		
Registered electors		11,695		
Turnout		5,237	44.8%	

=== Breckfield ===
Breckfield
Party	Candidate	Votes	%	±%
Labour	W. Lane	3,263	60%	
Liberal	R. C. Littler	1,309	24%	
Independent	S. Bell	634	12%	
Conservative	Elizabeth Bayley	200	4%	
Majority		1,954		
Registered electors		11,449		
Turnout		5,406	47.2%	

=== Broadgreen ===
Broadgreen
Party	Candidate	Votes	%	±%
Liberal	Chris Curry	3,500	50%	
Labour	G. M. Casey	2,960	43%	
Conservative	G. Powell	492	7%	
Majority		540		
Registered electors		13,271		
Turnout		6,952	52.4%	

=== Childwall ===
Childwall
Party	Candidate	Votes	%	±%
Liberal	Neville C. Chinn	5,216	68%	
Labour	R. Griffiths	1,454	19%	
Conservative	Helen Rigby	1,013	13%	
Majority		3,762		
Registered electors		13,650		
Turnout		7,683	56.3%	

=== Church ===
Church
Party	Candidate	Votes	%	±%
Liberal	Bill Roberts	5,478	67%	
Labour	J. Murray	1,396	17%	
Conservative	T. P. Pink	1,313	16%	
Green	J. E. Hulton			
Majority		4,082		
Registered electors		14,744		
Turnout			56.7%	

=== Clubmoor ===
Clubmoor 2 seats
Party	Candidate	Votes	%	±%
Labour	T. McManus	3,886	58%	
Labour	K. Noon	3,789	57%	
SDP	Ann Collinge	2,120	32%	
SDP	J. P. Prince	2,109	32%	
Conservative	Audrey Bowness	518	8%	
Conservative	Jean Greaves	456	7%	
Communist	K. F. McDonough	162	2%	
Majority		1,766		
Registered electors		13,512		
Turnout		6,686	48.9%	

=== County ===
County
Party	Candidate	Votes	%	±%
Liberal	Jean Newton	3,589	51%	
Labour	J. Briercliffe	3,110	44%	
Conservative	J. F. Atkinson	298	4%	
Majority		479		
Registered electors		12,559		
Turnout		6,997	55.7%	

=== Croxteth ===
Croxteth
Party	Candidate	Votes	%	±%
SDP	J. J. Cunningham	4,077	54%	
Labour	J. P. Evans	1,935	26%	
Conservative	F. R. Butler	1,534	20%	
Majority		2,142		
Registered electors		13,736		
Turnout		7,546	55.6%	

=== Dingle ===
Dingle 2 seats
Party	Candidate	Votes	%	±%
Labour	Hannah Folan	3,102	53%	
Labour	R. J. Lafferty	3,073	52%	
Liberal	J. E. Rossington	2,534	43%	
Liberal	M. C. Alman	2528	43%	
Conservative	Diane Watson	204	3%	
Conservative	Steven Fitzsimmons	191	3%	
Communist	J. Cook	47	1%	
Majority		568		
Registered electors		10,810		
Turnout		5,868	54.3%	

=== Dovecot ===
Dovecot 3 seats
Party	Candidate	Votes	%	±%
Labour	Robbie Quinn	2,740	66%	
Labour	M. Davison	2,718	65%	
Labour	Harry Rimmer	2,597	63%	
Liberal	Eleanor Carroll	1,470	35%	
Liberal	J. P. Cooper	1,282	31%	
Liberal	W. F. Burke	1,041	35%	
Conservative	W. H. Connolly	391	9%	
Conservative	J. L. Walsh	360	9%	
Conservative	H. Glover	334	8%	
Majority		1,270		
Registered electors		10,940		
Turnout		4,150	39.4%	

=== Everton ===
Everton 2 seats
Party	Candidate	Votes	%	±%
Labour	J. P. Brady	2,264	83%	
Labour	George Knibb	2,119	77%	
Liberal	P. Howard	357	13%	
Liberal	E. Price	305	11%	
Conservative	R. S. Fairclough	117	4%	
Conservative	J. A. Watson	82	3%	
Majority		1,907		
Registered electors		6,449		
Turnout		2,738	40.7%	

=== Fazakerley ===
Fazakerley 3 seats
Party	Candidate	Votes	%	±%
Labour	Linda O'Sullivan	3,227	63%	
Labour	I. H. Scott	3,192	62%	
Labour	Frank Vaudrey	3,106	60%	
SDP	D. Stephenson	1,408	27%	
Liberal	E. Chinn	1,397	27%	
SDP	Joan Reece	1,319	26%	
Conservative	A. Brown	628	12%	
Conservative	Maureen Brash	529	10%	
Conservative	Maria Quirk	491	10%	
Majority		1,819		
Registered electors		11,163		
Turnout		5,153	45.7%	

=== Gillmoss ===
Gillmoss 2 seats
Party	Candidate	Votes	%	±%
Labour	Eddie D. Roderick	3,288	71%	
Labour	Mary V. Roberts	3,174	71%	
Liberal	E. T. Boult	910	20%	
Liberal	J. S. Thomson	807	18%	
Conservative	G. W. Barker	409	9%	
Conservative	S. E. North	347	8%	
Majority		2,264		
Registered electors		11,205		
Turnout		4,493	39.9%	

=== Granby ===
Granby 3 seats
Party	Candidate	Votes	%	±%
Labour	Elizabeth Drysdale	2,874	64%	
Labour	Gideon S. Ben-Tovim	2,836	63%	
Labour	P. Hughes	2,770	62%	
Liberal	Carol Laidlaw	1,226	27%	
Liberal	B. E. Grocott	1,128	25%	
Liberal	M. Ali	1,087	24%	
Federated Black Organisations	D. Burris	360		
Federated Black Organisations	S. G. Deckon	290	6%	
Conservative	Henrietta Edwards	189	4%	
Conservative	Mary Armstrong	179	4%	
Conservative	June Brandwood	160	4%	
Communist	E. F. Caddick	138	3%	
Majority		1,648		
Registered electors		10,387		
Turnout		4,500	43%	

=== Grassendale ===
Grassendale
Party	Candidate	Votes	%	±%
Liberal	Gerry P. Scott	5,356	71%	
Conservative	S. R. Marsden	1,141	15%	
Labour	Eileen Turnbull	1,009	13%	
Majority		4,347		
Registered electors		12,310		
Turnout		7,506	61.0%	

=== Kensington ===
Kensington 2 seats
Party	Candidate	Votes	%	±%
Liberal	Jimmy Kendrick	2,775	48%	
Labour	J. C. Blackall	2,743	48%	
Liberal	A. Damsell	2,721	47%	
Labour	J. M. Spencer	2,694	47%	
Conservative	R. Bethel	248	4%	
Conservative	Dorothy Smith	208	4%	
Majority				
Registered electors		12,124		
Turnout		5,766	47.0%	

=== Melrose ===
Melrose 2 seats
Party	Candidate	Votes	%	±%
Labour	G. C. Booth	3,632	63%	
Labour	Mary Kidd	3,443	60%	
Liberal	J. Murray	1,908	33%	
Liberal	C. Mayes	1,856	32%	
Conservative	J. D. Jones	215	4%	
Conservative	Ann Nugent	175	3%	
Majority		1,724		
Registered electors		11,975		
Turnout		5,755	46.9%	

=== Netherley ===
Netherley 3 seats
Party	Candidate	Votes	%	±%
Labour	M. Bolland	2,432	65%	
Labour	R. P. Owen	2,266	61%	
Labour	Lesley Mahmood	2,171	58%	
SDP	D. L. Chambers	994	27%	
Liberal	C. L. Hughes	895	24%	
Liberal	A. Hale	882	24%	
Conservative	W. A. Dobinson	290	8%	
Conservative	J. J. Taylor	191	5%	
Conservative	A. McTigue	174	5%	
Majority		1,438		
Registered electors		7,477		
Turnout		3,716	49.7%	

=== Old Swan ===
Old Swan
Party	Candidate	Votes	%	±%
Labour	L. Hughes	2,932	45%	
Liberal	Josephine Smith	2,916	45%	
Conservative	C. P. Williams	499	8%	
Independent Labour	Glynis Slack	178	3%	
Majority		16		
Registered electors		11,764		
Turnout		6,525	55.5%	

=== Picton ===
Picton
Party	Candidate	Votes	%	±%
Liberal	John Bradley	3,538	57%	
Labour	E. A. Taylor	2,342	38%	
Conservative	S. P. Andrews	229	4%	
Green	A. G. Willan	89	1%	
Majority		1,196		
Registered electors		11,080		
Turnout		6,198	55.9%	

=== Pirrie ===
Pirrie 3 seats
Party	Candidate	Votes	%	±%
Labour	W. Owen	3,820	70%	
Labour	W. E. Edwards	3,811	70%	
Labour	Dot Gavin	3,769	69%	
Alliance	Hilary Owen	1,484	27%	
Alliance	N. E. Humphreys	1,310	24%	
Alliance	I. G. Youds	1,245	23%	
Conservative	P. M. Aldcroft	343	6%	
Conservative	R. M. Brandwood	301	6%	
Conservative	Eunice Egan	328	6%	
Majority		2,336		
Registered electors		11,784		
Turnout			46%	

=== St. Mary's ===
St. Mary's 2 seats
Party	Candidate	Votes	%	±%
Alliance	W. C. Hutchinson	2,919	48%	
Labour	Frank O'Donoghue	2,840	47%	
Labour	S. Balmer	2,764	45%	
Alliance	Hazel Williams	2,642	43%	
Conservative	W. D. Henry	318	5%	
Conservative	F. Sellers	250	4%	
Majority				
Registered electors		11,156		
Turnout			55%	

=== Smithdown ===
Smithdown 3 seats
Party	Candidate	Votes	%	±%
Labour	I. Templeman	2,682	56%	
Labour	Juliet Herzog	2,660	56%	
Labour	Judith Nelson	2,555	54%	
Alliance	E. R. Stephenson	2,102	44%	
Alliance	Shirley Parry	2,001	42%	
Alliance	Mary Young	1,921	40%	
Conservative	J.S. Smith	113	2%	
Conservative	Sarah L. Williamson	100	2%	
Conservative	A. Vigar	82	2%	
Majority				
Registered electors		9,916		
Turnout			48%	

=== Speke ===
Speke 3 seats
Party	Candidate	Votes	%	±%
Labour	P. Coventry	3,163	77%	
Labour	J. Doyle	3,113	76%	
Labour	S. P. Wilde	2,897	70%	
Alliance	J. D. Ball	677	16%	
Alliance	B. Aston	615	15%	
Alliance	R. E. Gould	593	14%	
Conservative	A. J. Fayer	335	8%	
Conservative	C. W. Harpin	308	7%	
Conservative	Carys Parry	263	6%	
Majority				
Registered electors		9,005		
Turnout			46%	

=== Tuebrook ===
Tuebrook
Party	Candidate	Votes	%	±%
Alliance	Richard Pine	3,093	53%	
Labour	S. Sullivan	2,367	41%	
Conservative	W. Scott	366	6%	
Majority		726		
Registered electors		12,839		
Turnout		5,826	45%	

=== Valley ===
Valley 3 Seats
Party	Candidate	Votes	%	±%
Labour	M. Burke	2,240	54%	
Labour	Frank Ruse	2,104	51%	
Labour	S. Sharpey-Schafer	2,100	51%	
Alliance	Ian Phillips	1,761	43%	
Alliance	J. Diamond	1,701	41%	
Alliance	S. F. Jacobs	1,609	39%	
Conservative	Helen Constantine	171	4%	
Conservative	Janet Mannion	171	4%	
Conservative	Maureen Murphy	164	4%	
Majority		479		
Registered electors		9,062		
Turnout			46%	

=== Vauxhall ===
Vauxhall
Party	Candidate	Votes	%	±%
Labour	J. Livingstone	2,665	92%	
Alliance	S. T. McHugh	165	5%	
Conservative	R. D. Knox	69	2%	
Majority		2,500		
Registered electors		6,717		
Turnout		2,899	43%	

=== Warbreck ===
Warbreck
Party	Candidate	Votes	%	±%
Alliance	Joe. Lang	3,659	50%	
Labour	Catherine Wilson	2,963	41%	
Conservative	I. Brown	679	9%	
Majority		696		
Registered electors		14,402		
Turnout		7,301	51%	

=== Woolton ===
Woolton
Party	Candidate	Votes	%	±%
Alliance	Pauline McKibbin	3,635	50%	
Conservative	A. McVeigh	2,632	36%	
Labour	C. B. Cole	951	13%	
Green	D. Lindsay	107	1%	
Majority		1,012		
Registered electors		12,868		
Turnout		7,316		
