= Keith Raffan =

British politician

Member of the Scottish Parliament for Mid Scotland and Fife (1 of 7 Regional MSPs)
- In office 6 May 1999 – 7 January 2005
- Preceded by: New Parliament
- Succeeded by: Andrew Arbuckle

Member of Parliament for Delyn
- In office 9 June 1983 – 16 March 1992
- Preceded by: Constituency Established
- Succeeded by: David Hanson

Personal details
- Born: Keith William Twort Raffan; 21 June 1949 (age 76) Aberdeen, Scotland
- Party: None (since 2016)
- Other political affiliations: Conservative (until 1992); Liberal Democrats (1992–2016)

Keith William Twort Raffan (born 21 June 1949) is a former British politician. From 1983 to 1992, he served in the British House of Commons as the Conservative Member of Parliament (MP) for the Delyn constituency in Wales. Then from 1999 to 2005, he was a Scottish Liberal Democrat Member of the Scottish Parliament (MSP) for the Mid Scotland and Fife region.

== Early life ==
Raffan was born in Aberdeen and educated at Robert Gordon's College, Trinity College, Glenalmond, and Corpus Christi College, Cambridge. Prior to entering parliament he was a parliamentary sketchwriter for the Daily Express.

== Conservative MP, 1983–1992 ==
Originally a Conservative, Raffan was in the early 1970s a chairman of Pressure for Economic and Social Toryism (a precursor of the Tory Reform Group), thus placing him on the left of the party. At this time he stood unsuccessfully for parliament in two general elections, at Dulwich in February 1974 and East Aberdeenshire in October 1974.

He was elected as Conservative MP for the Welsh seat of Delyn from 1983 to 1992, but his views on issues like drugs put him out of favour with the prevailing leadership of Margaret Thatcher, and he was never made a Minister. Raffan was one of the few Conservative MPs to support the 'stalking horse' leadership challenge of Anthony Meyer (his constituency neighbour in north Wales) against Thatcher in 1989, and he then supported Michael Heseltine's challenge to Thatcher the following year.

== Scottish parliament, 1999–2005 ==
Raffan stood down from the House of Commons at the 1992 general election and abandoned the Tories, in part because of his strong support for Scottish and Welsh devolution. He joined the Liberal Democrats that same year, and after working as a broadcaster and public relations consultant in New York and for Welsh TV channel HTV moved to Scotland. In 1998 he stood as the Liberal Democrat candidate in the European Parliament by-election for North East Scotland, and soon afterwards was appointed the Scottish party's chief spokesman on home affairs.

In the 1999 Scottish Parliament election Raffan was elected as a regional list MSP to represent Mid Scotland and Fife. He was one of three Liberal Democrat MSPs – along with Donald Gorrie and John Farquhar Munro – who opposed the coalition with the Labour Party in the Scottish Parliament, and was alone among his Liberal Democrat colleagues in not backing Donald Dewar for First Minister (he abstained from the vote). Noted for his flamboyant and theatrical manner when participating in debate, early in the parliament's first term he gained notoriety for tabling 38 written questions in one day.

Raffan was re-elected at the 2003 Scottish Parliament election, and became a Vice Convener of the Scottish Liberal Democrats. However, in December 2004 he was subject to wide criticism for claiming abnormally large expense costs from the Scottish Parliament, including travel in his Fife constituency at times when he was known to be in Parliament in Edinburgh. The following month he resigned as an MSP, citing ill-health (and not the controversy his expense claims had caused or the accusations of inappropriate sexual and bullying behaviour towards his staff) as the reason.

He faced further criticism after his resignation for working at ITV Wales despite being "too sick to work". He was replaced in his seat by Andrew Arbuckle, who had been next on the Liberal Democrat list for Mid Scotland and Fife in 2003. As of 2018, he was reportedly no longer a member of the Scottish Liberal Democrats.

== After politics ==
In the run up to the 2018 local elections, Raffan wrote a letter to the Evening Standard declaring that he was going to vote for the Labour Party in Kensington, where he was living.

He has subsequently left his third political party and now considers himself an independent.

Parliament of the United Kingdom
New constituency	Member of Parliament for Delyn; 1983–1992	Succeeded by David Hanson
Scottish Parliament
Preceded by New Parliament	Mid Scotland and Fife (1 of 7 Regional MSPs); 6 May 1999– 7 January 2005	Succeeded by Andrew Arbuckle
