= Delyn (UK Parliament constituency) =

UK Parliament constituency (1983–2024)

Coordinates: 53.252°N 3.193°W

- Former county constituency for the House of Commons
- Boundary of Delyn in Wales
- Preserved county: Clwyd
- Electorate: 54,405 (December 2010)
- Major settlements: Mold, Flint, Holywell

1983–2024
- Seats: One
- Created from: Flintshire West, Flintshire East
- Replaced by: Alyn and Deeside, Clwyd East
- Senedd: Delyn, North Wales

Delyn was a constituency in the House of Commons of the UK Parliament from 1983 to 2024.

The Delyn Senedd constituency was created with the same boundaries in 1999 (as an Assembly constituency).

The constituency was abolished as part of the 2023 Periodic Review of Westminster constituencies and under the June 2023 final recommendations of the Boundary Commission for Wales. Its wards were split between Alyn and Deeside, and Clwyd East.

It was last represented from 2019 to 2024 by Rob Roberts.

== Constituency profile ==
The seat comprised the mostly industrial Deeside communities of Mostyn, Flint, Mold, Northop and Holywell. Its residents were slightly less affluent than the UK average.

== Boundaries ==
Map of boundaries 2010-2024

1983–1997: The Borough of Delyn, and the Borough of Rhuddlan wards of Meliden, Prestatyn Central, Prestatyn East, Prestatyn North, and Prestatyn South West.

1997–2010: The Borough of Delyn.

2010–2024: The Flintshire electoral divisions of Argoed, Bagillt East, Bagillt West, Brynford, Caerwys, Cilcain, Ffynnongroyw, Flint Castle, Flint Coleshill, Flint Oakenholt, Flint Trelawney, Greenfield, Gronant, Gwernaffield, Gwernymynydd, Halkyn, Holywell Central, Holywell East, Holywell West, Leeswood, Mold Broncoed, Mold East, Mold South, Mold West, Mostyn, New Brighton, Northop, Northop Hall, Trelawnyd and Gwaenysgor, and Whitford.

== History ==
The Delyn constituency was created in 1983 from the seats of Flintshire West and Flintshire East. It is normally inclined to elect Labour MPs, although the Conservatives won the seat in their 1983 and 1987 landslide elections, and regained it in 2019 when they won their biggest national majority since the 1980s. From 1983 to 1997, the constituency included Tory-leaning Prestatyn, which was then transferred to the Vale of Clwyd seat.

== Members of Parliament ==
Election	Member	Party
1983	Keith Raffan	Conservative
1992	David Hanson	Labour
2019	Rob Roberts	Conservative
May 2021	Rob Roberts	Independent
2024	Constituency abolished	

== Elections ==
=== Elections in the 1980s ===
General election 1983: Delyn
Party	Candidate	Votes	%	±%
Conservative	Keith Raffan	20,242	41.6	N/A
Labour	James Colbert	14,298	29.4	N/A
Liberal	John Parry	12,545	25.8	N/A
Plaid Cymru	Haydn Huws	1,558	3.2	N/A
Majority		5,944	12.2	N/A
Turnout		60,643	77.9	N/A
Registered electors		62,483		
Conservative win (new seat)				

General election 1987: Delyn
Party	Candidate	Votes	%	±%
Conservative	Keith Raffan	21,728	41.4	–0.2
Labour	David Hanson	20,504	39.1	+9.7
Liberal	David Evans	8,913	17.0	–8.8
Plaid Cymru	David Owen	1,329	2.5	–0.7
Majority		1,224	2.3	–9.9
Turnout		52,474	82.6	+4.7
Registered electors		63,541		
Conservative hold		Swing		

=== Elections in the 1990s ===
General election 1992: Delyn
Party	Candidate	Votes	%	±%
Labour	David Hanson	24,979	45.0	+5.9
Conservative	Mike Whitby	22,940	41.3	–0.1
Liberal Democrats	Raymond Dodd	6,208	11.2	–5.8
Plaid Cymru	Ashley J. Drake	1,414	2.5	±0.0
Majority		2,039	3.7	N/A
Turnout		55,541	83.4	+0.8
Registered electors		66,591		
Labour gain from Conservative		Swing	+3.0	

General election 1997: Delyn
Party	Candidate	Votes	%	±%
Labour	David Hanson	23,300	57.2	+12.2
Conservative	Karen Lumley	10,607	26.0	–15.3
Liberal Democrats	David Lloyd	4,160	10.2	–1.0
Plaid Cymru	Ashley J. Drake	1,558	3.8	+1.3
Referendum	Elizabeth H. Soutter	1,117	2.7	N/A
Majority		12,693	31.2	+27.5
Turnout		40,742	75.9	–7.5
Registered electors		53,693		
Labour hold		Swing	+12.0	

=== Elections in the 2000s ===
General election 2001: Delyn
Party	Candidate	Votes	%	±%
Labour	David Hanson	17,825	51.5	–5.7
Conservative	Paul Brierley	9,220	26.6	+0.6
Liberal Democrats	John Jones	5,329	15.4	+5.2
Plaid Cymru	Paul Rowlinson	2,262	6.5	+2.7
Majority		8,605	24.9	–6.3
Turnout		34,636	63.3	–12.6
Registered electors		54,732		
Labour hold		Swing	–3.2	

General election 2005: Delyn
Party	Candidate	Votes	%	±%
Labour	David Hanson	15,540	45.7	–5.8
Conservative	John Bell	8,896	26.2	–0.4
Liberal Democrats	John Jones	6,089	17.9	+2.5
Plaid Cymru	Phil Thomas	2,524	7.4	+0.9
UKIP	May Crawford	533	1.6	N/A
Independent	Nigel Williams	422	1.2	N/A
Majority		6,644	19.5	–5.4
Turnout		34,004	64.4	+1.1
Registered electors		53,383		
Labour hold		Swing	–2.7	

=== Elections in the 2010s ===
General election 2010: Delyn
Party	Candidate	Votes	%	±%
Labour	David Hanson	15,083	40.8	–4.9
Conservative	Antoinette Sandbach	12,811	34.6	+8.5
Liberal Democrats	Bill Brereton	5,747	15.5	–2.4
Plaid Cymru	Peter Ryder	1,844	5.0	–2.4
BNP	Jennifer Matthys	844	2.3	N/A
UKIP	Andrew Haigh	655	1.8	+0.2
Majority		2,272	6.1	–13.4
Turnout		36,984	69.2	+5.5
Registered electors		53,470		
Labour hold		Swing	–6.7	

General election 2015: Delyn
Party	Candidate	Votes	%	±%
Labour	David Hanson	15,187	40.5	–0.3
Conservative	Mark Isherwood	12,257	32.7	–1.9
UKIP	Nigel Williams	6,150	16.4	+14.6
Plaid Cymru	Paul Rowlinson	1,803	4.8	–0.2
Liberal Democrats	Tom Rippeth	1,380	3.7	–11.8
Green	Kay Roney	680	1.8	N/A
Rejected ballots		75		
Majority		2,930	7.8	+1.7
Turnout		37,457	69.8	+0.6
Registered electors		53,639		
Labour hold		Swing	+0.8	

Of the 75 rejected ballots:

- 54 were either unmarked or it was uncertain who the vote was for.
- 20 voted for more than one candidate.
- 1 had writing or mark by which the voter could be identified.

General election 2017: Delyn
Party	Candidate	Votes	%	±%
Labour	David Hanson	20,573	52.2	+11.7
Conservative	Matt Wright	16,333	41.1	+8.4
Plaid Cymru	Paul Rowlinson	1,481	3.8	–1.0
Liberal Democrats	Tom Rippeth	1,031	2.6	–1.1
Rejected ballots		69		
Majority		4,240	10.8	+3.0
Turnout		39,418	72.8	+3.0
Registered electors		54,090		
Labour hold		Swing	+1.5	

Of the 69 rejected ballots:

- 48 were either unmarked or it was uncertain who the vote was for.
- 19 voted for more than one candidate.
- 2 had writing or mark by which the voter could be identified.

General election 2019: Delyn
Party	Candidate	Votes	%	±%
Conservative	Rob Roberts	16,756	43.7	+2.6
Labour	David Hanson	15,891	41.4	–10.8
Liberal Democrats	Andrew Parkhurst	2,346	6.1	+3.5
Brexit Party	Nigel Williams	1,971	5.1	N/A
Plaid Cymru	Paul Rowlinson	1,406	3.7	–0.1
Rejected ballots		105		
Majority		865	2.3	N/A
Turnout		38,370	70.3	–2.5
Registered electors		54,552		
Conservative gain from Labour		Swing	+6.7	

Of the 105 rejected ballots:

- 87 were either unmarked or it was uncertain who the vote was for.
- 18 voted for more than one candidate.

== See also ==
- Delyn (Senedd constituency)
- List of parliamentary constituencies in Clwyd
- List of parliamentary constituencies in Wales
