= Clwyd East =

UK Parliament constituency (since 2024)

- constituency for the House of Commons
- Interactive map of the constituency.
- Location of the constituency within Wales
- Preserved county: Clwyd
- Electorate: 76,395 (March 2020)
- Major settlements: Llangollen, Mold, Prestatyn, Ruthin, Holywell

Current constituency
- Created: 2024
- Member of Parliament: Becky Gittins (Labour)
- Seats: One
- Created from: Clwyd South, Clwyd West, Delyn, Vale of Clwyd.

Overlaps
- Senedd: Clwyd

Clwyd East (Welsh: Dwyrain Clwyd) is a constituency of the House of Commons in the UK Parliament, first contested at the 2024 general election, following the 2023 review of Westminster constituencies. It is currently represented by Becky Gittins of the Labour Party.

== Boundaries ==
Under the 2023 review, the constituency was defined as being composed of the following, as they existed on 1 December 2020:

- The County of Denbighshire wards of: Dyserth, Llandyrnog, Prestatyn Central, Prestatyn East, Prestatyn Meliden, Prestatyn North, Prestatyn South West, Tremeirchion, Llanarmon-yn-Ial/Llandegla, Llanbedr Dyffryn Clwyd/Llangynhafal, Llanfair Dyffryn Clwyd/Gwyddelwern, Llangollen, and Ruthin.
- The County of Flintshire wards of: Argoed, Brynford, Caerwys, Cilcain, Ffynnongroyw, Greenfield, Gronant, Gwernaffield, Gwernymynydd, Halkyn, Holywell Central, Holywell East, Holywell West, Leeswood, Mold Broncoed, Mold East, Mold South, Mold West, Mostyn, New Brighton, Northop, Northop Hall, Trelawnyd and Gwaenysgor, and Whitford.
- The County Borough of Wrexham ward of Llangollen Rural.

Following local government boundary reviews which came into effect in May 2022, the constituency now comprises the following from the 2024 general election:

- The County of Denbighshire wards of: Alyn Valley, Dyserth, Llandyrnog, Llanfair Dyffryn Clwyd Gwyddelwern, Llangollen, Moel Famau, Prestatyn Central, Prestatyn East, Prestatyn Meliden, Prestatyn North, Prestatyn South West, Ruthin, and Tremeirchion.
- The County of Flintshire wards of: Argoed and New Brighton, Brynford and Halkyn, Caerwys, Cilcain, Greenfield, Gwernaffield and Gwernymynydd, Holywell Central, Holywell East, Holywell West, Leeswood, Llanasa and Trelawnyd, Mold: Broncoed, Mold East, Mold South, Mold West, Mostyn, Northop, and Whitford.
- The County Borough of Wrexham ward of Llangollen Rural.

The seat was formed from the following areas of abolished constituencies:

- Parts in Flintshire, including Holywell and Mold, from Delyn
- Prestatyn from Vale of Clwyd
- Ruthin from Clwyd West
- Llangollen from Clwyd South

== Election results ==
=== Elections in the 2020s ===
General election 2024: Clwyd East
Party	Candidate	Votes	%	±%
Labour	Becky Gittins	18,484	38.7	+0.8
Conservative	James Davies	13,862	29.0	−18.9
Reform	Kirsty Walmsley	7,626	15.9	+11.8
Plaid Cymru	Paul Penlington	3,733	7.8	+3.1
Liberal Democrats	Alec Dauncey	1,859	3.9	−1.4
Green	Lee Lavery	1,659	3.5	N/A
Independent	Rob Roberts	599	1.3	N/A
Majority		4,622	9.7	N/A
Turnout		47,822	62.4	−6.7
Registered electors		76,150		
Labour gain from Conservative		Swing		

=== Elections in the 2010s ===
2019 notional result (Note: Estimate of the 2019 general election result as if the revised boundaries recommended under the 2023 boundary review were in place)
Party	Vote	%
Conservative	25,324	47.9
Labour	20,040	37.9
Liberal Democrats	2,823	5.3
Plaid Cymru	2,460	4.7
Brexit Party	2,173	4.1
Majority	5,284	10.0
Turnout	52,820	69.1
Electorate	76,395	
