= Deeside Consortium =

Educational consortium in Wales

The Deeside Consortium is a local arrangement in Flintshire, North Wales between four schools:

- John Summers High
- Connah's Quay High in Connah's Quay
- St David's High in Saltney
- Flint High in Flint

The consortium exists to share 6th form education between the four schools. The schools are too small to provide good education in all the A-level courses on offer, so each school specialises.
