= Clwyd (constituency) =

Senedd constituency (from 2026)

- County multi-member constituency for the Senedd
- Boundary of Clwyd in Wales
- Principal areas: Conwy County Borough; Denbighshire; Flintshire; Wrexham County Borough
- Preserved county: Clwyd
- Population: 198,297 (2024)
- Major settlements: Colwyn Bay, Denbigh, Holywell, Llangollen, Mold, Rhyl, Ruthin, Prestatyn, St Asaph

Current County multi-member constituency
- Created: 2026
- Seats: 6
- Created from: UK Parliament boundaries: Clwyd East; Clwyd North; Previous Senedd constituencies: Clwyd South; Clwyd West; Delyn; Vale of Clwyd; Previous Senedd region: North Wales

Clwyd (from River Clwyd;) is a six-member constituency of the Senedd (Welsh Parliament; Welsh: Senedd Cymru) used in the 2026 Senedd election. It covers western Flintshire, the east and north of Denbighshire, the area around Colwyn Bay and Abergele in Conwy County Borough, and the area around Trevor in Wrexham County Borough.

It was proposed following the 2026 review of Senedd constituencies, and is a pairing of the two UK Parliament constituencies of Clwyd East and Clwyd North. It has a Welsh-only name.

== Boundaries ==
The constituency encompasses western Flintshire, including Mold and Holywell, and the west and north of Denbighshire including Rhyl, Prestatyn, St Asaph, Denbigh, Ruthin, and Llangollen. It also includes Abergele, Colwyn Bay, and Rhos-on-Sea from Conwy County Borough, and the far south-east includes the village of Trevor in Wrexham County Borough.

A Senedd constituency comprising the boundaries of the UK Parliament constituencies of Clwyd East and Clwyd North, has been proposed by the Democracy and Boundary Commission Cymru for the 2026 election to the Senedd (Welsh Parliament; Senedd Cymru). It was initially proposed in September 2024, but was unchanged in the December proposals as most other constituencies adopted Welsh-only names. The name and boundaries were confirmed in the commission's final recommendations in March 2025. When announcing their candidates, Reform UK used "Clwyd East, Clwyd North" instead, using the English names for the pair of UK Parliament constituencies that form it.

The constituency was established in 2026, following the passing of the Senedd Cymru (Members and Elections) Act 2024. The act legislates electoral reform of the Senedd to create 16 larger "super constituencies", pairing the 32 UK Parliament constituencies in Wales, and using a new fully proportional voting system, with each constituency electing six Members of the Senedd (MSs) rather than one previously.

== Members of the Senedd ==
Term	Election	Distribution	MS	MS	MS	MS	MS	MS
7th	2026	2 / 1 / 3	Adrian Mason (Ref)	Llyr Gruffydd (PC)	Darren Millar (Con)	Louise Emery (Ref)	Becca Martin (PC)	Thomas Montgomery (Ref)

== Elections ==
=== Elections in the 2020s ===
2026 Senedd election: Clwyd
Party	Candidate	Votes	%	±%
Reform	Adrian Mason (E) Louise Emery (E) Thomas Montgomery (E) David Smith Kristian Salkeld Tony Thomas	25,741	32.3	+31.2
Plaid Cymru	Llyr Gruffydd (E) Becca Martin (E) Oliver Bradley-Hughes Paul Penlington Delyth Jones Abdul Khan	22,583	28.3	+12.6
Conservative	Darren Millar (E) Gareth Davies Gareth Ffowcs Williams Justine Marie Evans Sylvia Hughes Damon Richards-Gwilliam Mike Gebreyohanes	16,193	20.3	−15.1
Labour	Hannah Blythyn Carolyn Thomas Crispin Jones Ellen Jones Rajeev Metri Catherine Claydon Arran Fearn Cheryl Williams	8,314	10.4	−24.6
Green	Martyn Hogg Carly Murdoch-Dyson Lucy Sutton Karl McNaughton David Blainey Cheryl Buxton-Sait	4,219	5.3	+2.6
Liberal Democrats	David Wilkins Bobby Feeley Nanette Davies Simon Croft Jason Higgins Keith Kirwan	2,355	3.0	−0.4
Heritage	Robert Redhead	352	0.4	New
Majority		3,158	4.0	New
Turnout		79,757	51.3	+4.5
Registered electors		155,536		
Reform win (new seat)				

2021 notional result (Note: Estimate of the 2021 Senedd election result as if the revised boundaries recommended under the 2026 boundary review were in place)
Party	Vote	%	Seats
Conservative	28,672	39.3	3
Labour	28,263	38.7	2
Plaid Cymru	9,775	13.4	1
Liberal Democrats	2,684	3.7	0
UKIP	1,157	1.6	0
Reform UK	1,067	1.5	0
Independent	529	0.7	0
Abolish	486	0.7	0
Gwlad	324	0.4	0
