= Adrian Mason =

Welsh politician

Adrian Mason MS
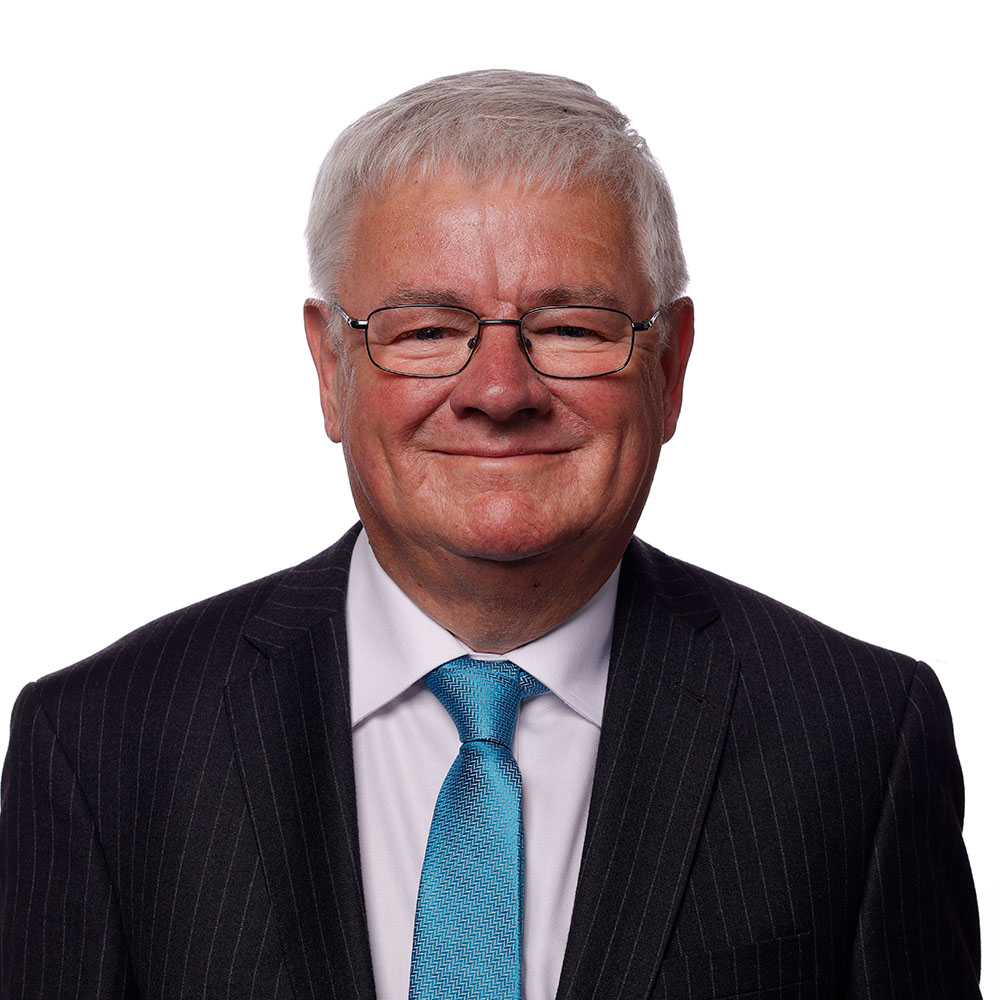
- Official portrait, 2026

Member of the Senedd
- Incumbent
- Assumed office 8 May 2026
- Constituency: Clwyd

Personal details
- Party: Reform UK
- Other political affiliations: Welsh Conservatives (previously)

Adrian Gwyn Mason is a Welsh politician serving as a Member of the Senedd for Clwyd since 2026 representing Reform UK.

Mason was previously a member of the Welsh Conservatives, having previously contested unsuccessfully with the Tories in the 2017 Conwy County Borough Council election. He has previously served as a Colwyn Bay town councillor.

Before entering politics, Mason was a law tutor for the Chartered Institute of Legal Executives qualification, including as course leader at Radbrook College, Shrewsbury.

Mason previously served as the Head of Governors for Ysgol Iau Hen Golwyn, in Old Colwyn. He was criticised in 2019 after he asked the parent of an autistic child if "all autistic children are violent" in a hearing regarding an autistic pupils' exclusion. The parent later took their concerns to a tribunal, which ruled in their favour and ordered the school to provide additional training around autism to both staff and governors.
