= Louise Emery =

Welsh politician

Louise Emery MS
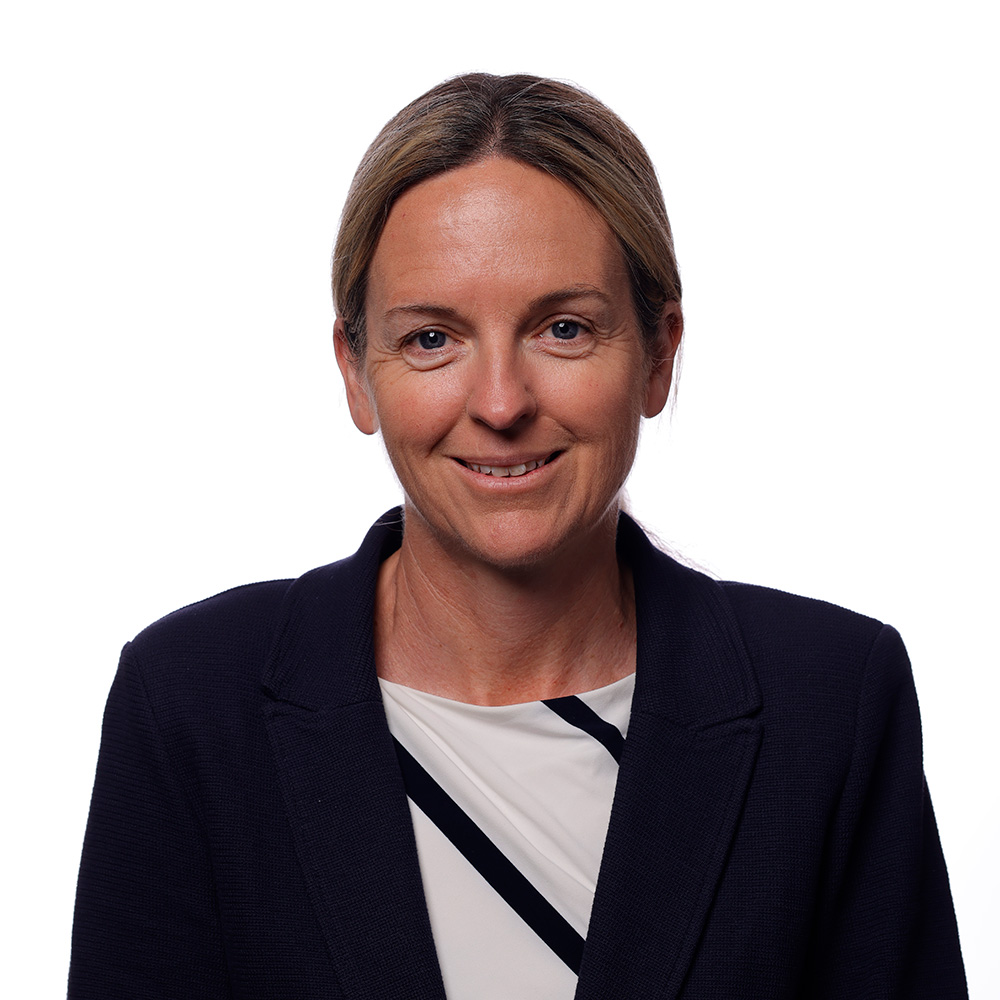
- Official portrait, 2026

Member of the Senedd
- Incumbent
- Assumed office 8 May 2026
- Constituency: Clwyd

Personal details
- Party: Reform UK
- Other political affiliations: Welsh Conservatives (previously)

Louise Gail Emery is a Welsh politician who has been a Member of the Senedd (MS) for Clwyd since the 2026 election, representing Reform UK.

== Political career ==
Emery was previously a member of the Welsh Conservatives, having been elected with the Tories in both the 2017 and 2022 Conwy County Borough Council elections. She defected to Reform in July 2025.

In January 2026 Emery became involved in controversy after the Welsh Conservatives raised concerns over Conwy County Borough Council's plans to sell Llandudno Town Hall and the nearby car park for to an organisation for £1. Emery denied the allegations, insisting that she intended the building to be placed in a community interest company and renovated, with a private estates company owning the freehold to the building.

== Personal life ==
Emery is a businessperson and property developer.
