= 1988 Liverpool City Council election =

1988 UK local government election

- 5 May 1988

34 seats were up for election (one third): one seat for each of the 33 wards plus one by-election. 50 seats needed for a majority

Elections to Liverpool City Council were held on 5 May 1988. One third of the council was up for election and the Labour Party kept overall control of the council.

After the election, the composition of the council was:

Party	Seats	±
Labour	??	??
Social and Liberal Democrats	??	??
Conservative	??	??
Independent	??	??
Others	??	??

== Election result ==
Liverpool local election result 1988
Party	Seats	Gains	Losses	Net gain/loss	Seats %	Votes %	Votes	+/−
Labour	23	3	0	+3	70%	55%	86,383	
SLD	8	1	2	-1	27%	17%	27,574	
Conservative	2	0	2	-2	6%	12%	18,242	
SDP	0			0	0%	2%	2,787	
Green	0			0	0%	1%	1,769	
Communist	0			0	0%	0.3%	400	

== Ward results ==
These results are compared with the 1984 elections when councillors were elected for a four-year term.

* = Councillor elected in 1984 and standing for re-election.

=== Abercromby ===
Abercromby
Party	Candidate	Votes	%	±%
Labour	K. Feintuck	2,070	81%	▲1%
SLD	Carole Matthews	186	7%	▼3%
Conservative	P. Lee	180	7%	Steady
Communist	P. Carroll	129	5%	▲2%
Majority		1,884		
Registered electors		8,960		
Turnout		2,565	38%	
Labour hold		Swing	▲1%	

=== Aigburth ===
Aigburth
Party	Candidate	Votes	%	±%
SLD	Cathy Hancox *	2,475	43%	−10%
Labour	K. Taft	2,079	36%	+9%
Conservative	N. Liddell	965	17%	−2%
Green	Joanne Cook	272	5%	
Majority		396		
Turnout		5,791		
SLD hold		Swing	-10%	

=== Allerton ===
Allerton
Party	Candidate	Votes	%	±%
Labour	T. Smith	2,029	36%	+12%
SLD	M. Ali	1,642	29%	+3%
Conservative	M. Kingston	1,532	27%	−23%
SDP	R. Gould	399	7%	
Green	R. Cantwell	100	2%	
Majority		387		
Turnout		5,702		
Labour gain from Conservative		Swing	+12%	

=== Anfield ===
Anfield
Party	Candidate	Votes	%	±%
Labour	Judith Nelson	2,890	51%	+8%
SLD	R. Jump	2,147	38%	0%
Conservative	Myra Fitzsimmons	518	9%	−10%
SDP	J. Prince	105	2%	
Majority		743		
Turnout		5,660		
Labour hold		Swing	+8%	

=== Arundel ===
Arundel
Party	Candidate	Votes	%	±%
Labour	Victoria Roberts	2,381	52%	+10%
SLD	B. Grocott	1,559	34%	−9%
Conservative	D. Patmore	346	8%	−7%
Green	G. Thomson	213	5%	
Communist	J. Crawley	47	1%	0%
Majority		822		
Turnout		4,546		
Labour gain from SLD		Swing	+3.5	

=== Breckfield ===
Breckfield
Party	Candidate	Votes	%	±%
Labour	Mary McGiveron	3,148	77%	+27%
SLD	H. Burt	663	16%	−30%
Conservative	Elizabeth Bayley	266	7%	+3%
Majority		2,485		
Turnout		4,077		
Labour hold		Swing		

=== Broadgreen ===
Broadgreen
Party	Candidate	Votes	%	±%
SLD	Rosie Cooper *	3,109	51%	+3%
Labour	F. Gillard	2,599	42%	−1%
Conservative	J. Baldwin	314	5%	−5%
Green	Nina Morgan	61	1%	
SDP	R. Nolan	46	1%	
Majority		510		
Turnout		6,129		
SLD hold		Swing		

=== Childwall ===
Childwall
Party	Candidate	Votes	%	±%
SLD	Eddie Clein *	3,146	52%	+4%
Labour	R. Kennedy	1,527	25%	+6%
Conservative	Helen Rigby	1,215	20%	−14%
Green	A. Willan	185	3%	
Majority		1,619		
Turnout		6,073		
SLD hold		Swing		

=== Church ===
Church
Party	Candidate	Votes	%	±%
SLD	Mike Storey *	3,564	54%	+4%
Labour	J. Ashton	1,783	26%	+7%
Conservative	T. Pink	1,153	17%	−14%
Green	Janet Cantwell	201	3%	
Majority		1,826		
Turnout		6,656		
SLD hold		Swing		

=== Clubmoor ===
Clubmoor
Party	Candidate	Votes	%	±%
Labour	Keva Coombes	4,159	77%	+27%
SLD	Ann Collinge	666	12%	−13%
Conservative	W. Connolly	520	10%	−5%
Communist	K. McDonough	73	1%	
Majority		3,493		
Turnout		5,418		
Labour hold		Swing		

=== County ===
County
Party	Candidate	Votes	%	±%
SLD	Paul Clark *	3,188	49%	−5%
Labour	Sylvia Renilson	3,100	48%	+8%
Conservative	H. Quayle	164	3%	−3%
Majority		88		
Turnout		6,452		
SLD hold		Swing		

=== Croxteth ===
Croxteth
Party	Candidate	Votes	%	±%
SLD	Elaine Kinahan	2,163	36%	+12%
Labour	Catherine Rigby	1,885	31%	0%
Conservative	G. Brandwood *	1,745	29%	−18%
SDP	Joan Reece	218	4%	
Green	I. Graham	15	0.2%	
Majority		278		
Turnout		6,026		
SLD gain from Conservative		Swing		

=== Dingle ===
Dingle
Party	Candidate	Votes	%	±%
Labour	R. Lafferty	3,215	70%	+18%
SLD	W. Lamont	1,044	23%	−16%
Conservative	G. Earle	272	6%	−2%
Communist	J. Cook	30	1%	0%
Majority		2,171		
Turnout		4,561		
Labour hold		Swing		

=== Dovecot ===
Dovecot
Party	Candidate	Votes	%	±%
Labour	Harry Rimmer	2,622	77%	−7%
SLD	Norman Mills	429	13%	0%
Conservative	Audrey Bowness	356	10%	−7%
Majority		2,193		
Turnout		3,407		
Labour hold		Swing		

=== Everton ===
Everton
Party	Candidate	Votes	%	±%
Labour	George Knibb	1,988	92%	+5%
SLD	M. Key	98	5%	+1%
Conservative	R. Fairclough	72	3%	−5%
Majority		1,890		
Turnout		2,158		
Labour hold		Swing		

=== Fazakerley ===
Fazakerley
Party	Candidate	Votes	%	±%
Labour	Frank Vaudrey	3,465	77%	+17%
Liberal Democrats	C. Mayes	541	12%	−8%
Conservative	J. Atkinson	495	11%	−9%
Majority		2,924		
Turnout		4,501		
Labour hold		Swing	+17%	

=== Gillmoss ===
Gillmoss
Party	Candidate	Votes	%	±%
Labour	S. Ledwich	3,239	80%	+3%
Conservative	S. North	383	9%	−4%
SLD	C. Leahy	342	8%	−2%
Green	Susan Ellison	103	3%	
Majority		2,897		
Turnout		4,067		
Labour hold		Swing		

=== Granby ===
Granby
Party	Candidate	Votes	%	±%
Labour	P. Hughes	2,959	82%	+26%
SLD	E. Chin	335	9%	−30%
Conservative	Henrietta Edwards	200	6%	+2%
Communist	E. Caddick	121	3%	+2%
Majority		2,624		
Turnout		3,615		
Labour hold		Swing		

=== Grassendale ===
Grassendale
Party	Candidate	Votes	%	±%
SLD	W. Bullock	3,405	53%	−2%
Conservative	S. Marsden	1,656	26%	−5%
Labour	Eileen Turnbull	1,183	18%	+6%
Green	P. Kavanagh	197	3%	
Majority		2,222		
Turnout		6,441		
SLD hold		Swing		

=== Kensington ===
Kensington
Party	Candidate	Votes	%	±%
Labour	K. Ratcliffe	2,525	52%	+3%
SLD	Richard Kemp	2,026	42%	−2%
Conservative	R. Bethell	196	4%	+3%
Green	F. Wainwright	84	2%	
Majority		499		
Turnout		4,831		
Labour hold		Swing		

=== Melrose ===
Melrose
Party	Candidate	Votes	%	±%
Labour	Mary Kidd	3,519	82%	+24%
SLD	J. Murray	537	13%	−24%
Conservative	Ann Nugent	220	5%	+1%
Majority		2,982		
Turnout		4,276		
Labour hold		Swing		

=== Netherley ===
Netherley
Party	Candidate	Votes	%	±%
Labour	Lesley Mahmood	2,106	79%	+7%
SLD	Caroline Barnett	439	16%	0%
Conservative	Maureen Murphy	134	5%	−7%
Majority		1,667		
Turnout		2,679		
Labour hold		Swing		

=== Old Swan ===
Old Swan
Party	Candidate	Votes	%	±%
Labour	J. Fitzsimmons	2,975	65%	+14%
SLD	J. Berman	739	16%	−19%
Conservative	G. Powell	684	15%	−1%
SDP	J. Herbert	184	4%	
Majority		2,236		
Turnout		4,582		
Labour hold		Swing		

=== Picton ===
Picton
Party	Candidate	Votes	%	±%
SLD	Pam Bradley *	2,730	47%	−9%
Labour	Margaret Clarke	2,717	47%	+10%
Conservative	I. Bishop	221	4%	−3%
Green	D. Williams	112	2%	
Majority		13		
Turnout		5,780		
SLD hold		Swing		

=== Pirrie ===
Pirrie
Party	Candidate	Votes	%	±%
Labour	Dot Gavin	3,958	84%	+14%
SLD	Hilary Owen	412	9%	−5%
Conservative	P. Aldcroft	329	7%	−9%
Majority		3,546		
Turnout		4,699		
Labour hold		Swing		

=== St. Mary's ===
St. Mary's
Party	Candidate	Votes	%	±%
Labour	Frank O'Donoghue	3,599	67%	+16%
SLD	C. Hughes	1,454	27%	−10%
Conservative	Innes Fleming	275	5%	−7%
Green	D. Lindsay	60	1%	
Majority		2,145		
Turnout		5,388		
Labour hold		Swing		

=== Smithdown ===
Smithdown
Party	Candidate	Votes	%	±%
Labour	D. Bermingham	2,791	77%	+18%
SLD	Mary Young	648	18%	−19%
Conservative	F. Ryan	193	5%	+1%
Majority		2,143		
Turnout		3,632		
Labour hold		Swing		

=== Speke ===
Speke
Party	Candidate	Votes	%	±%
Labour	S. Wilde	2,972	84%	+25%
SLD	Victoria Clein	287	8%	−29%
Conservative	A. Faver	270	8%	+4%
Majority		2,685		
Turnout		3,529		
Labour hold		Swing		

=== Tuebrook ===
Tuebrook
Party	Candidate	Votes	%	±%
Liberal Party and Local Resident	Steve Radford *	2,747	52%	−1%
Labour	S. Sullivan	2,291	43%	+7%
Conservative	Edna Rodick	282	5%	−6%
Majority		456		
Turnout		5,320		
SLD hold		Swing	-1%	

=== Valley ===
Valley
Party	Candidate	Votes	%	±%
Labour	Sylvia Sharpey-Shafer	2,636	73%	+10%
SLD	G. Cleaeys	714	20%	+5%
Conservative	W. Dobinson	242	7%	−15%
Majority		1,922		
Turnout		3,592		
Labour hold		Swing		

=== Vauxhall ===
Vauxhall
Party	Candidate	Votes	%	±%
Labour	Paul Orr *	1,818	93%	−1%
SLD	S. McHugh	92	5%	
Conservative	R. Knox	51	3%	−3%
Majority		1,726		
Turnout		1,961		
Labour hold		Swing	-1%	

=== Warbreck ===
Warbreck
Party	Candidate	Votes	%	±%
Labour	H. Chase	3,144	52%	+15%
SLD	Elsie Lang	2,430	40%	0%
Conservative	Martha Thornton	492	8%	−15%
Majority		714		
Turnout		6,066		
Labour gain from SLD		Swing	+3.5	

=== Woolton ===
Woolton 2 seats
Party	Candidate	Votes	%	±%
Conservative	J. Backhouse	2,310	39%	−30%
Conservative	Steve Fitzsimmons	2,241	39%	−30%
SLD	Ron Gould	1,487	25%	+11%
SLD	Ian Phillips	1,424	25%	+11%
Labour	A. White	1,057	18%	0%
Labour	S. Balmer	1,056	18%	0%
SDP	Ms S. Parry	962	16%	
SDP	D. Pollard	873	16%	
Green	J. Hulton	166	3%	
Majority		814		
Turnout		5,928		
Conservative hold		Swing		
