= Andrew Arbuckle (politician) =

British politician (1944–2025)

Member of the Scottish Parliament for Mid Scotland and Fife
- In office 2005–2007
- Preceded by: Keith Raffan
- Succeeded by: Richard Simpson

Personal details
- Born: 12 April 1944
- Died: 25 December 2025 (aged 81)
- Party: Scottish Liberal Democrats

Andrew David Arbuckle MBE (12 April 1944 – 25 December 2025) was a Scottish journalist and Liberal Democrat politician, who served as a Member of the Scottish Parliament (MSP) for the Mid Scotland and Fife region. Arbuckle was first elected as a Fife councillor in 1986 and represented Newburgh until 2012.

Arbuckle replaced Keith Raffan at the Scottish Parliament after Raffan resigned in 2005. Arbuckle failed to win re-election at the 2007 Scottish Parliament election.

Arbuckle was from a farming background; he was brought up at Logie Farm, Fife, and was a past director of the cooperative Fife Growers (1974–77). He was the farming editor for The Courier from 1985 to 2005 and also fulfilled the same role at The Scotsman from 2007. In 2012 he received the Netherthorpe award, the UK's top award in agricultural journalism, from the Guild of Agricultural Journalists. He had covered crisis situations such as the 2001 Foot and Mouth outbreak and the cattle disease BSE, as well as writing commentary pieces.

Arbuckle also authored seven books including a volume to mark NFU Scotland's centenary. He served on the NFU Scotland Legal committee at national level for seven years and was awarded the NFU Scotland Ambassador Award in 2023.

Arbuckle was a former trustee of the RSABI agricultural welfare charity and an honorary vice-president. Andrew and his brother, John Arbuckle, published three light-hearted farming-related books which raised over £100,000 for the RSABI. He was honoured with an MBE for his RSABI work in the 2024 New Year's Honours and for services to farming and his community.

Arbuckle Lane in Newburgh is named after him. Arbuckle was a past-chairman of Newburgh Community Trust (NCT); the NCT raised over £250,000 to convert a former factory site into Riverside Park and Arbuckle also led the NCT to buy a former reservoir as a community-owned park between 2000 and 2010.

Arbuckle died on 25 December 2025, at the age of 81.
