= Flintshire =

County in Wales

Flintshire Sir y Fflint (Welsh)
- County
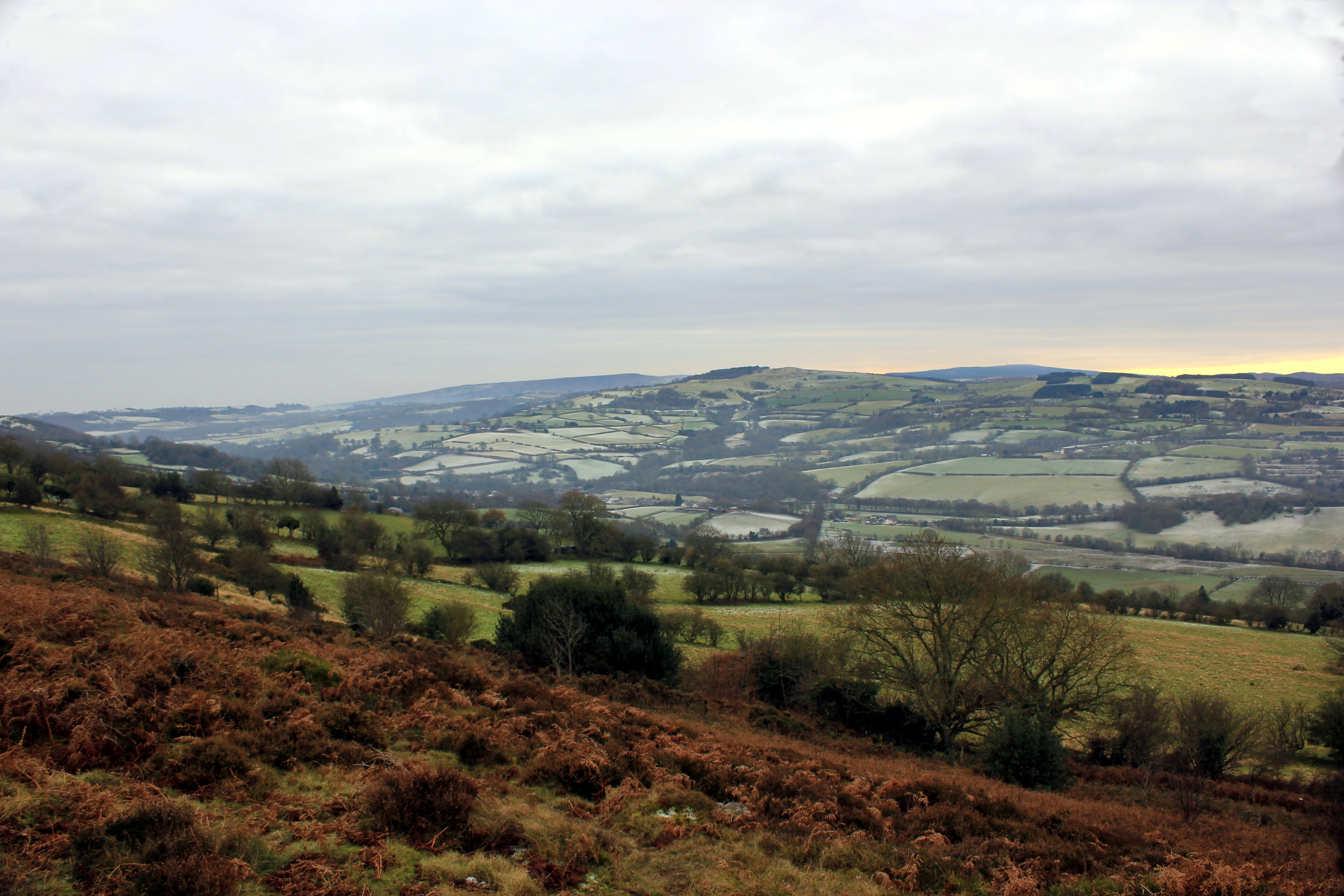
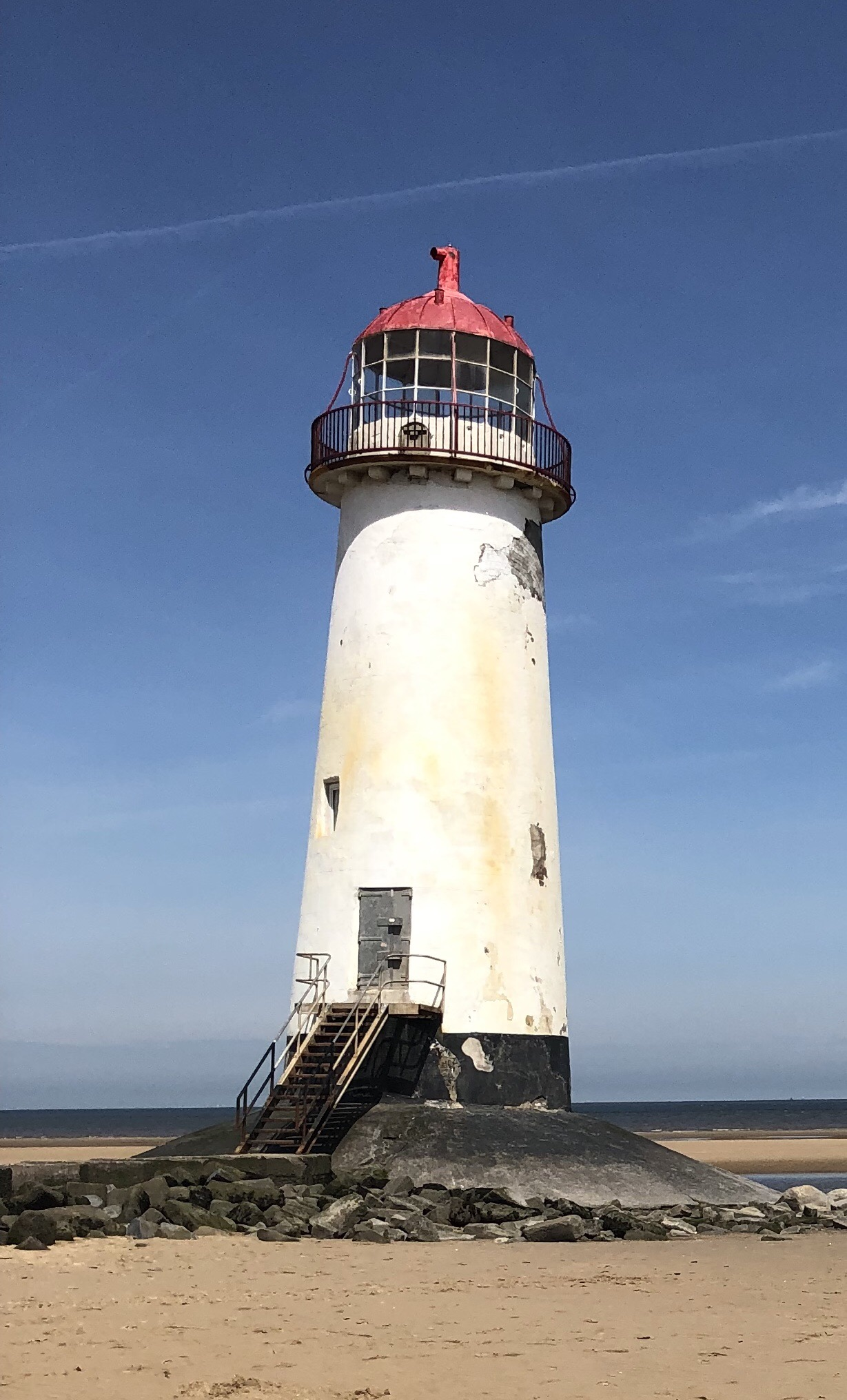
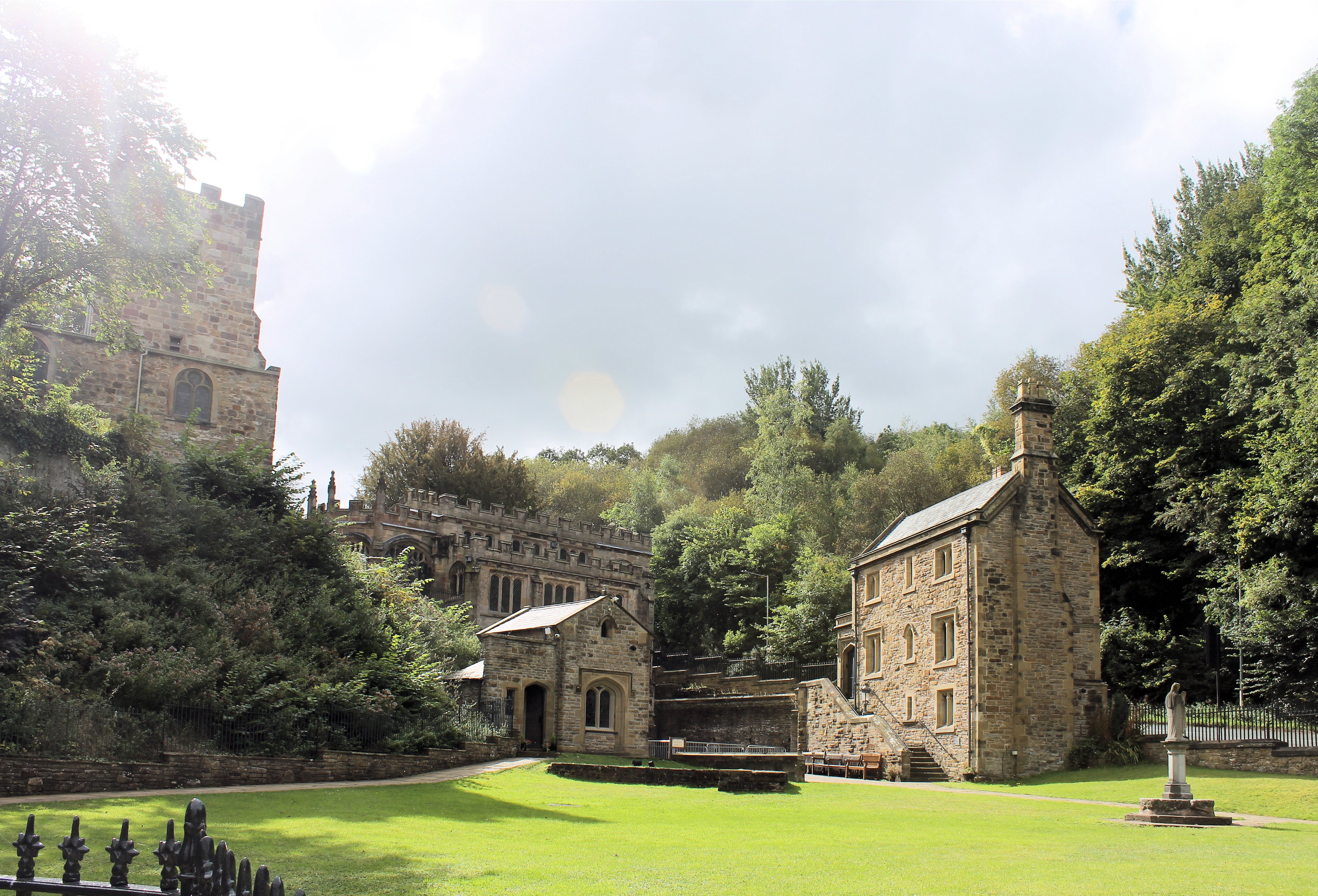
- Left to right: Clwydian Range from Waen y Llyn in Llanfynydd; Point of Ayr Lighthouse near Talacre; St Winefride's Well in Holywell

- Coat of arms
- Motto(s): Welsh: Gorou Tarian, Cyfiawnder, lit. 'the best shield is justice'
- Flintshire shown within Wales
- Coordinates: 53.218°N 3.143°W
- Sovereign state: United Kingdom
- Country: Wales
- Preserved county: Clwyd
- Incorporated: 1 April 1996
- Administrative HQ: Ewloe

Government
  - Type: Principal council
  - Body: Flintshire County Council
  - Control: No overall control
  - MPs: 2 MPs: Becky Gittins (L); Mark Tami (L)
  - MSs: 12 MSs: 6 in Clwyd; 6 in Fflint Wrecsam

Area
  - Total: 170 sq mi (440 km^{2})
  - Rank: 12th

Population (2025)
  - Total: 155,954
  - Rank: 7th
  - Density: 920/sq mi (355/km^{2})
- Time zone: UTC+0 (GMT)
  - Summer (DST): UTC+1 (BST)
- Postcode areas: CH; LL
- Dialling codes: 01352; 01745; 01244
- ISO 3166 code: GB-FLN
- GSS code: W06000005
- Website: flintshire.gov.uk

Flintshire (Welsh: Sir y Fflint) is a county in the north-east of Wales. It borders the Irish Sea to the north, the Dee Estuary to the north-east, the English county of Cheshire to the east, Wrexham County Borough to the south, and Denbighshire to the west. Connah's Quay is the largest town, and Flintshire County Council is based in Ewloe.

The county covers 169 square miles (440 km^{2}), with a population of 155,000 in 2021. After Connah's Quay (16,771), the largest settlements are Flint (13,736), Buckley (16,127) and Mold (10,123). The east of the county is industrialised and contains the Deeside conurbation, which extends into Cheshire and has a population of 53,568. The adjacent coast is also home to industry, but further west has been developed for tourism, particularly at Talacre. Inland, the west of the county is sparsely populated and characterised by gentle hills, including part of the Clwydian Range and Dee Valley AONB. The county is part of the preserved county of Clwyd.

The county is named after the historic county of the same name, which was established by the Statute of Rhuddlan in 1284 and has notably different borders. The county is considered part of the Welsh Marches and formed part of the historic Earldom of Chester and Flint.

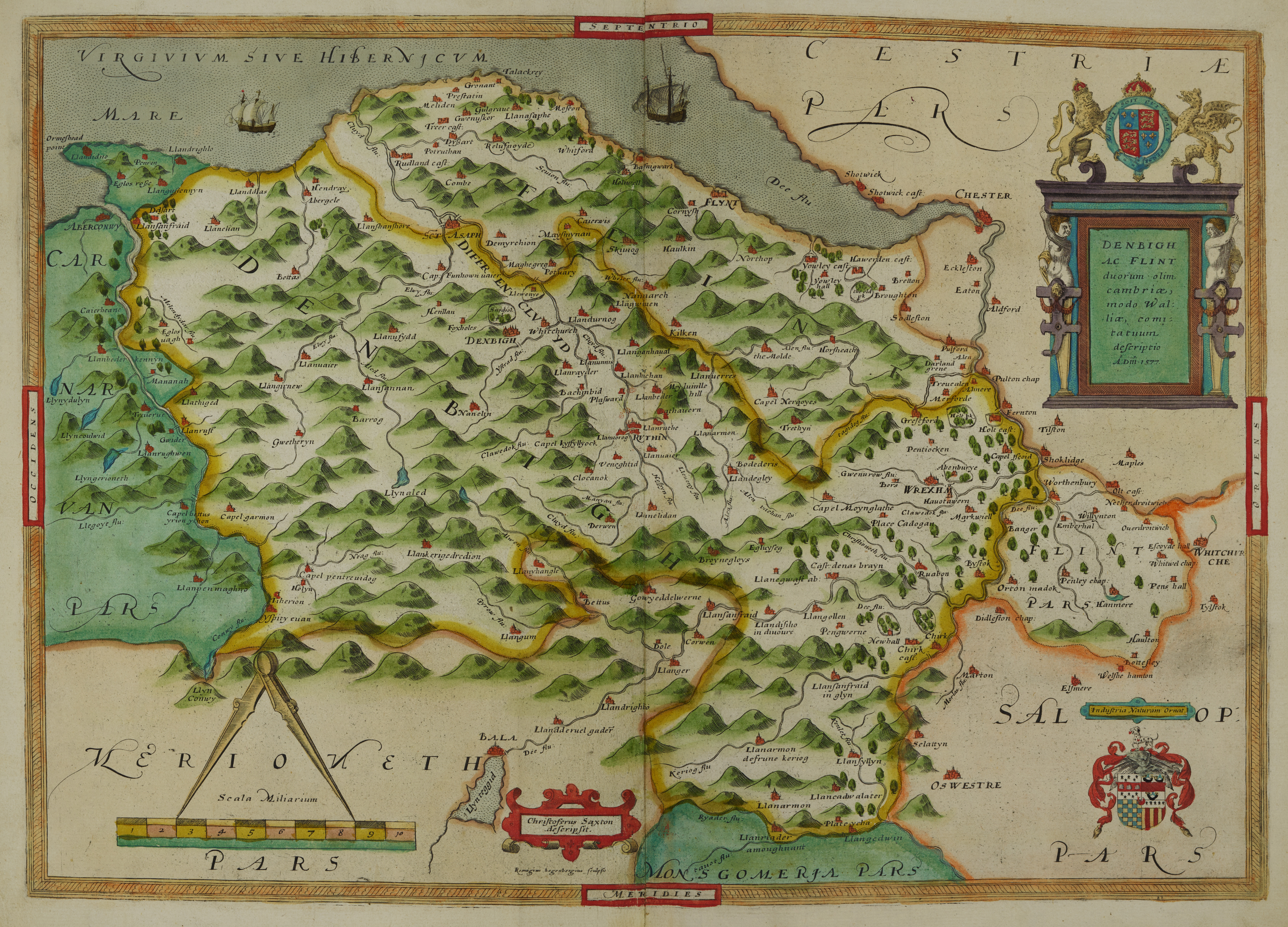
Hand-drawn map of Denbigh and Flint by Christopher Saxton from 1576

== History ==
Flintshire takes its name from the historic county of Flintshire, which also formed an administrative county between 1889 until 1974 when it was abolished under the Local Government Act 1972. The principal area re-established in 1996 under the Local Government (Wales) Act 1994 does not share the same boundaries and covers a smaller area.

=== Early history ===
At the time of the Roman invasion, the area of present-day Flintshire was inhabited by the Deceangli, one of the Celtic tribes in ancient Britain, with the Cornovii to the east and the Ordovices to the west. Lead and silver mine workings are evident in the area, with several sows of lead found bearing the name 'DECEANGI' inscribed in Roman epigraphy. The Deceangli appear to have surrendered to Roman rule with little resistance. Following Roman Britain, and the emergence of various petty kingdoms, the region had been divided into the Hundred of Englefield (Welsh: Cantref Tegeingl), derived from the Latin Deceangli.

The Domesday Hundreds of Atiscross and Exestan later forming the principal area of Flintshire are shown in pink.

It became part of the Kingdom of Mercia by the 8th century AD, with much of the western boundary reinforced under Offa of Mercia after 752, but there is evidence that Offa's Dyke is probably a much earlier construction. By the time of the Norman conquest in 1066 it was under the control of Edwin of Tegeingl, from whose Lordship the Flintshire coat of arms is derived.

Edwin's mother is believed to have been Ethelfleda or Aldgyth, daughter of Eadwine of Mercia. At the time of the establishment of the Earldom of Chester, which succeeded the Earl of Mercia, the region formed two of the then twelve Hundreds of Cheshire of which it remained a part for several hundred years.

Flintshire today approximately resembles the boundaries of the Hundred of Atiscross as it existed at the time of the Domesday Book. Atiscross, along with the Hundred of Exestan, was transferred from the Earldom of Chester to the expanding Kingdom of Gwynedd from the west in the 13th century following numerous military campaigns. This region, as well as an exclave formed from part of the Hundred of Dudestan (known as Maelor Saesneg), later formed the main areas of Flintshire, established by the Statute of Rhuddlan in 1284 under Edward I. It was administered with the Palatinate of Chester and Flint by the Justiciar of Chester. The county was consolidated in 1536 by the Laws in Wales Acts 1535–1542 under the Tudor King Henry VIII, when it was incorporated into the Kingdom of England; it included the detached exclave of Welsh Maelor.

Flintshire as a separate local authority remained in existence until 1974 when it was merged with those of Denbighshire and Edeyrnion Rural District to form the administrative county of Clwyd. Clwyd was abolished 22 years later and Flintshire reorganised in its present form in 1996. However, some parts of the historic country are not included within the present administrative boundaries: significantly English Maelor was incorporated into Wrexham County Borough, and St Asaph, Prestatyn and Rhyl into Denbighshire.

=== Modern history ===
The current administrative area of Flintshire (a unitary authority and Principal area) came into existence in 1996, when the former administrative counties in Wales were split into smaller areas. The principal area was formed by the merger of the Alyn and Deeside and Delyn districts. In terms of pre-1974 divisions, the area comprises:

- the former borough of Flint
- the urban districts of Buckley, Connah's Quay, Holywell, Mold
- the rural district of Holywell Rural District
- all of Hawarden Rural District except the parish of Marford and Hosley

The district of Rhuddlan, which was also formed entirely from the administrative county of Flintshire was included in the new Denbighshire instead. Other parts of the pre-1974 administrative Flintshire to be excluded from the principal area are the Maelor Rural District and the parish of Marford and Hoseley, which became part of the Wrexham Maelor district in 1974 and are now part of Wrexham County Borough.

== Geography ==
Flintshire is a maritime county bounded to the north by the Dee estuary, to the east by Cheshire, to the west by Denbighshire and to the south by Wrexham County Borough. The coast along the Dee estuary is heavily developed by industry and the north coast much developed for tourism. The Clwydian Range occupies much of the west of the county. The highest point is Moel Famau (1,820 feet/554 metres). Notable towns include Buckley, Connah's Quay, Flint, Hawarden, Holywell, Mold, Queensferry, and Shotton. The main rivers are the Dee (the estuary of which forms much of the coast), and the River Alyn.

=== Historic buildings and structures ===
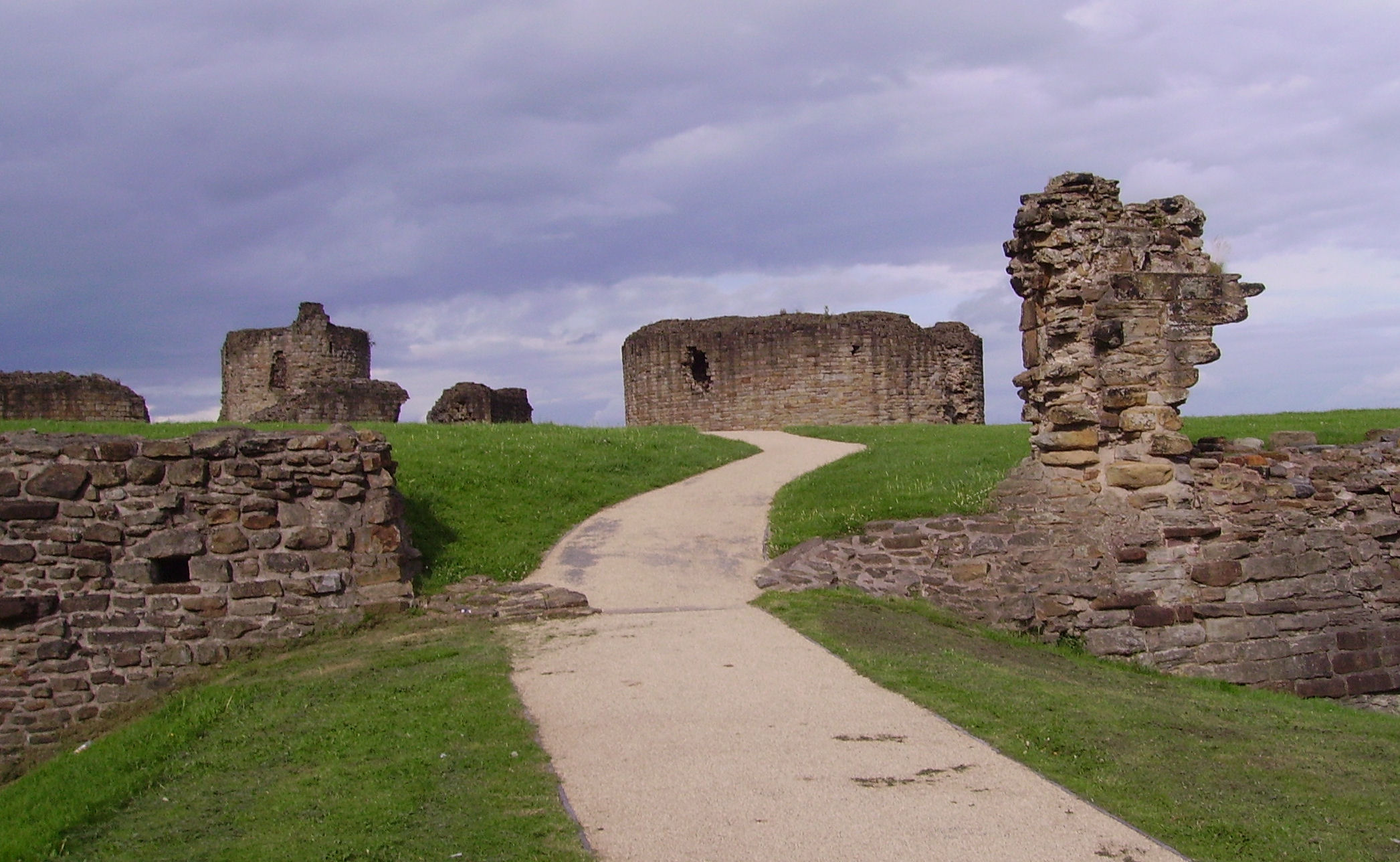
Flint Castle

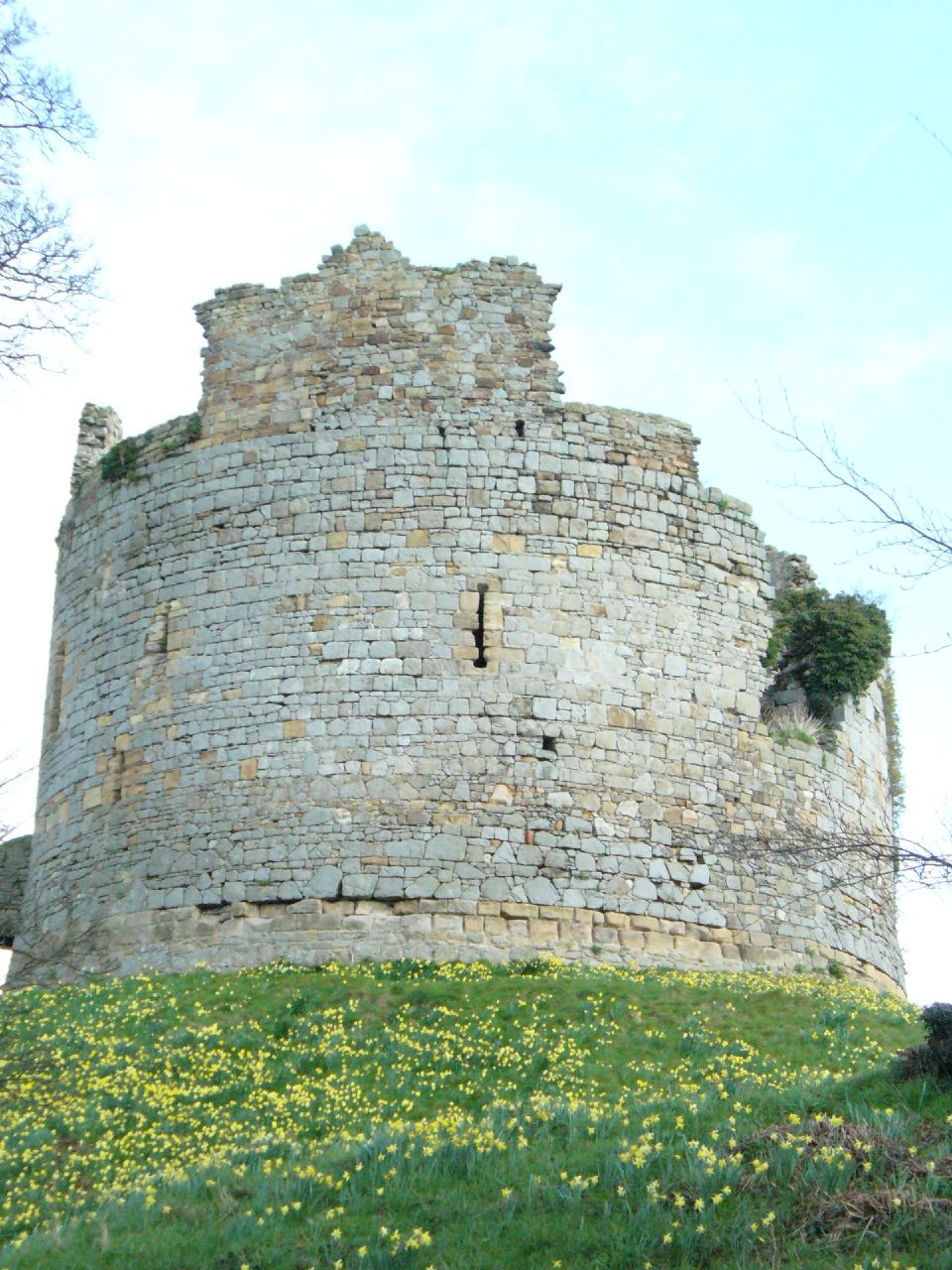
Hawarden Castle (medieval)

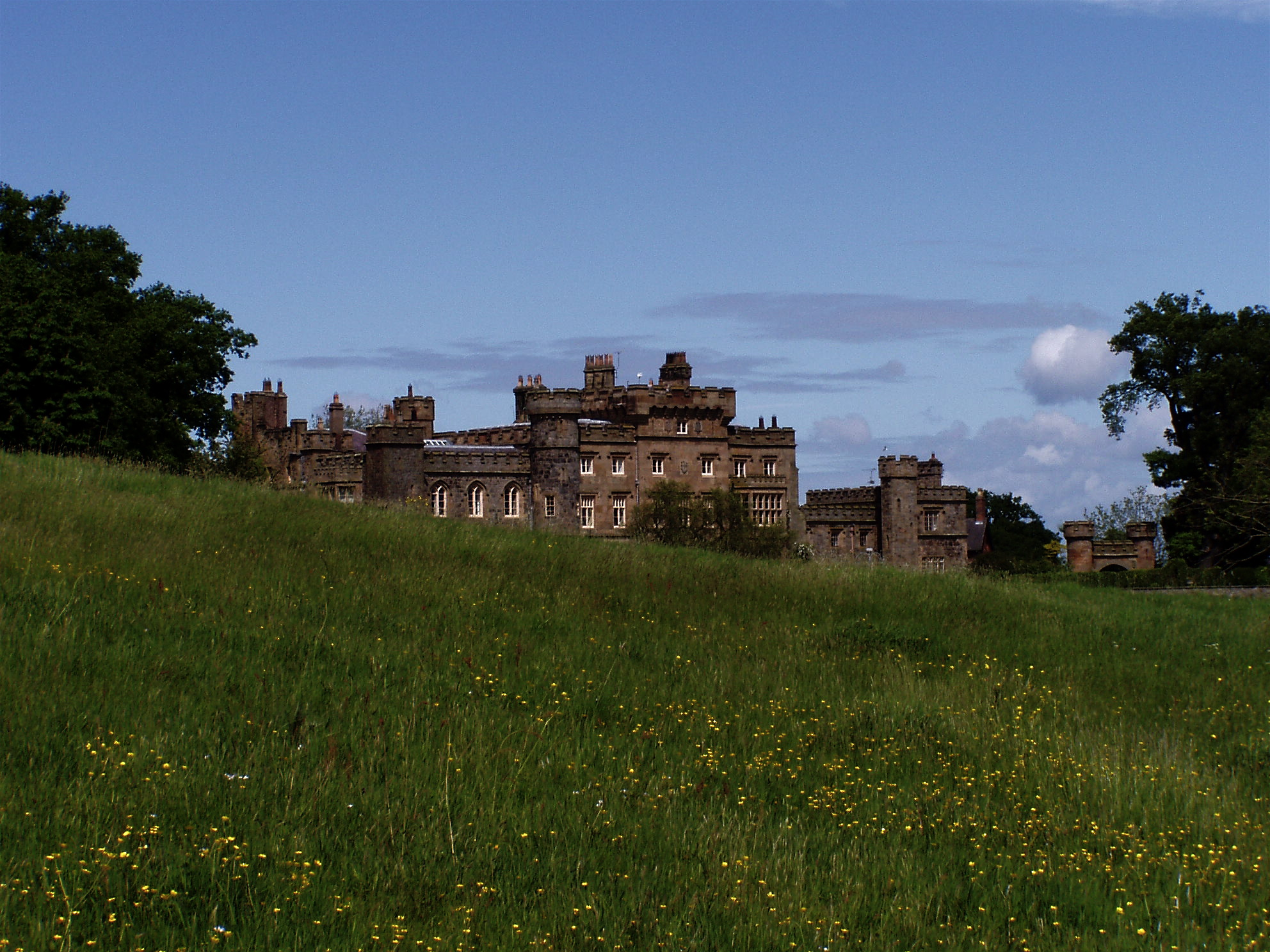
Hawarden Castle (18th century)

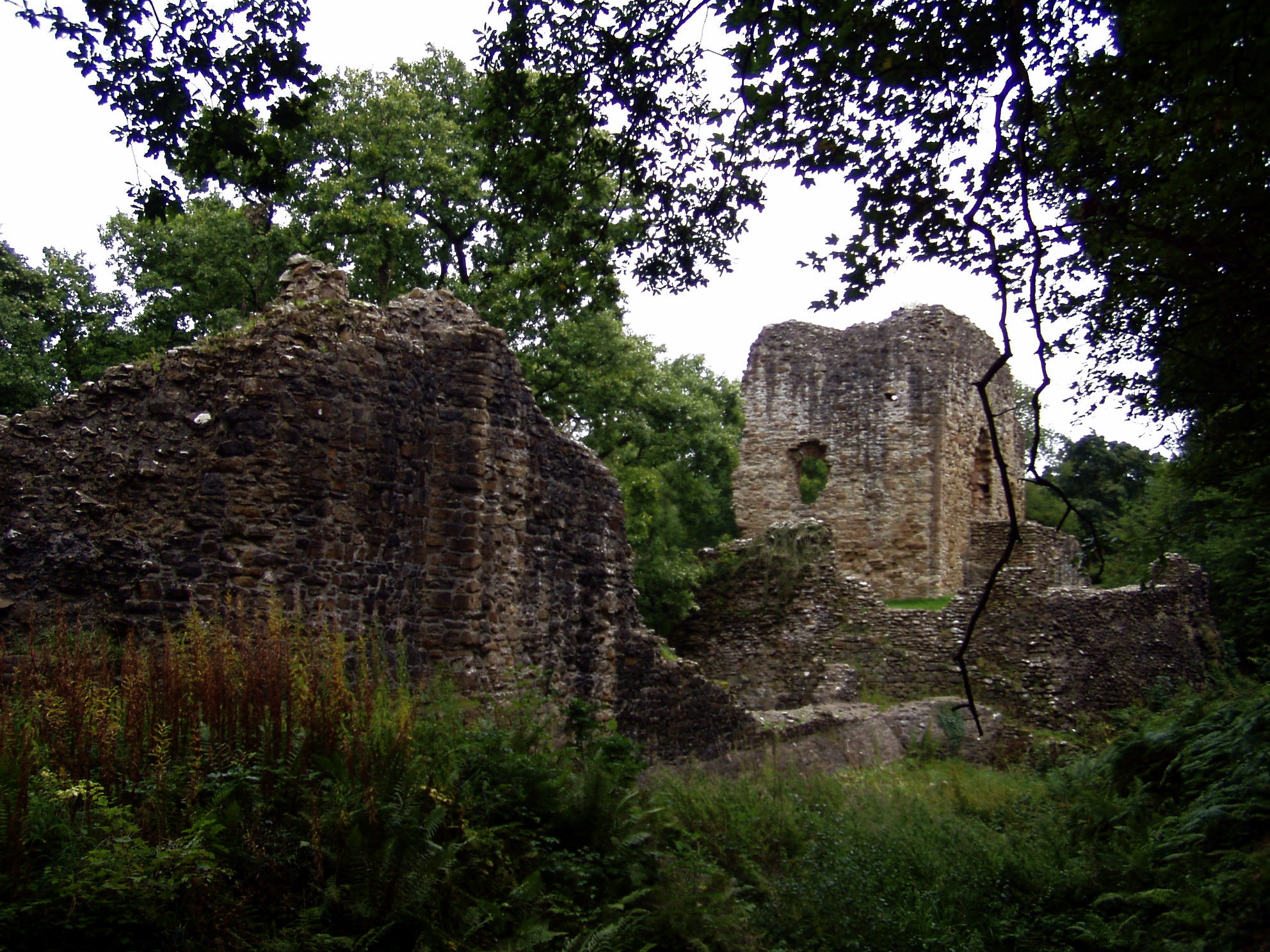
Ewloe Castle

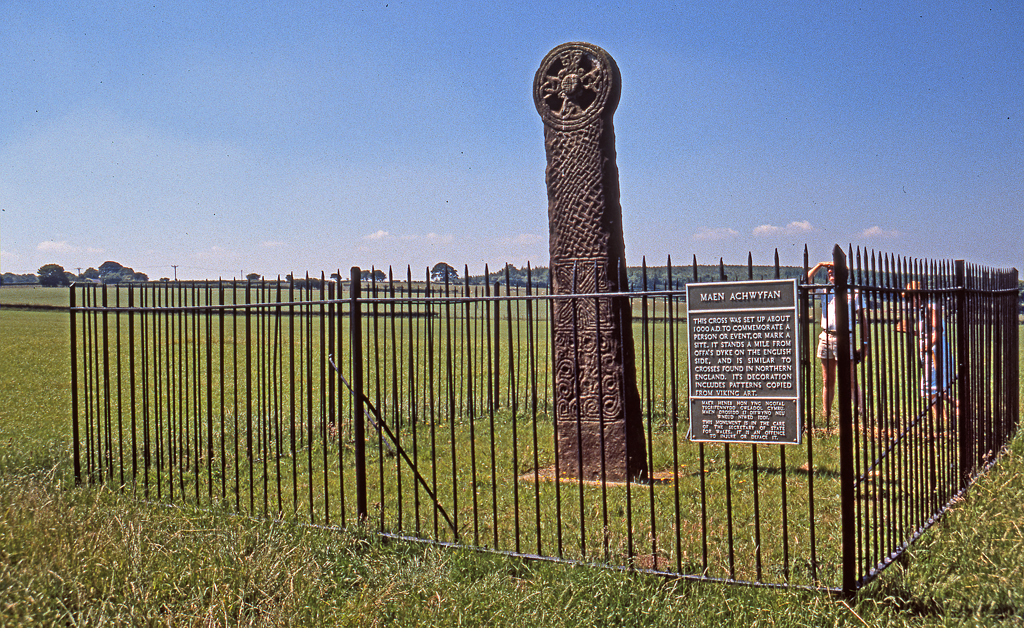
Ancient Cross at Whitford

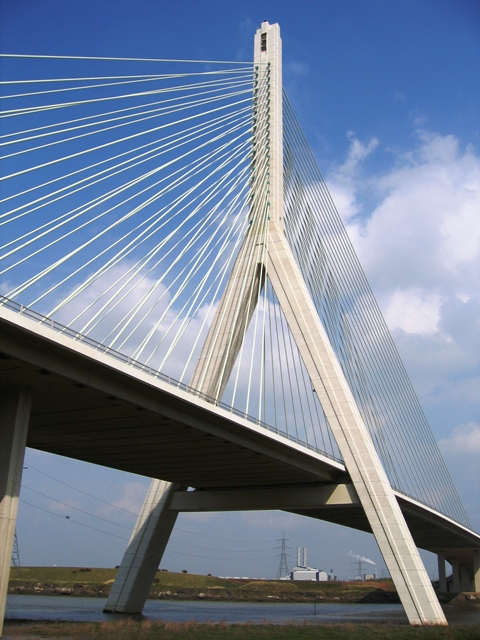
Flintshire Bridge

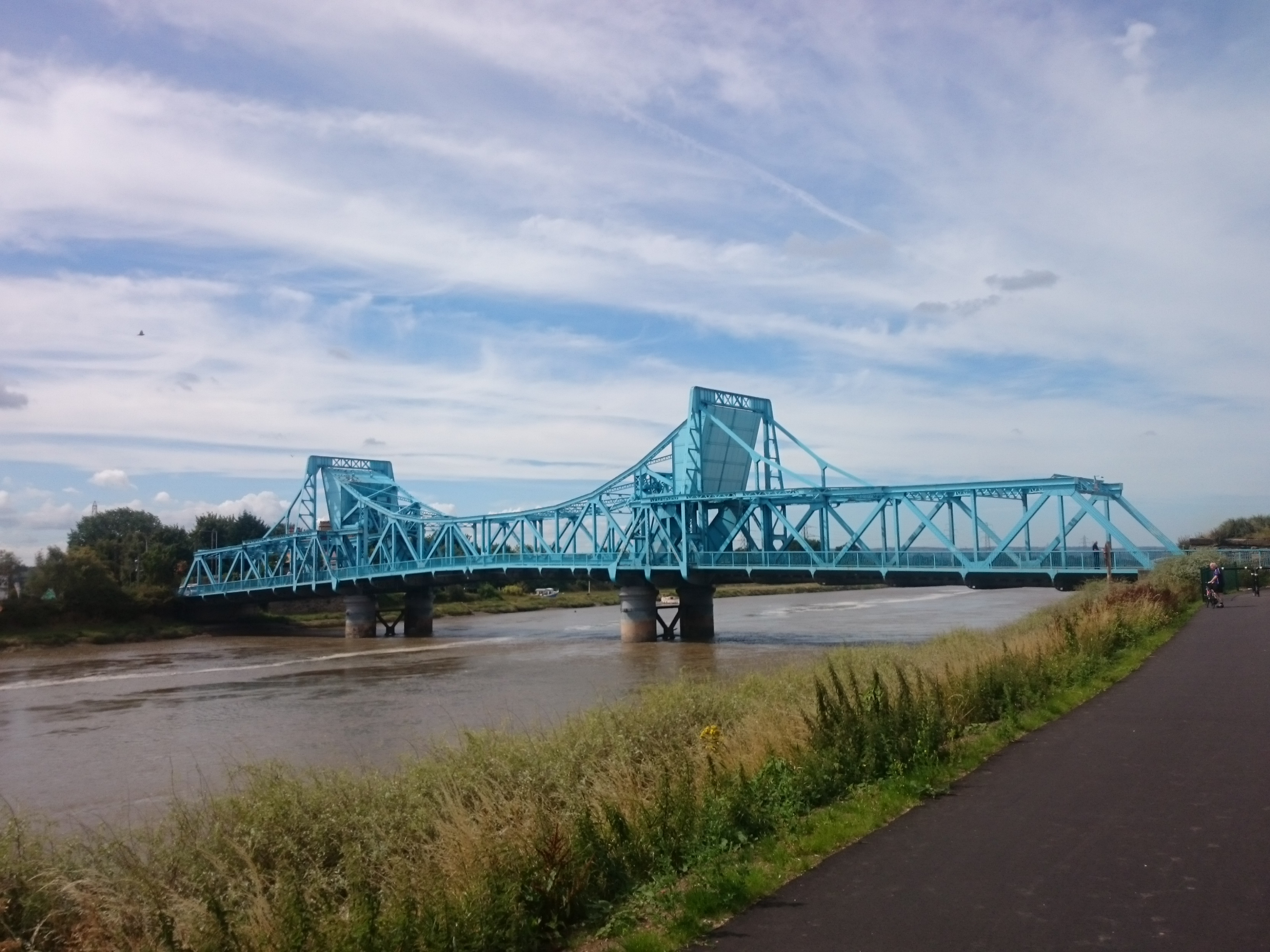
Queensferry Jubilee Bridge

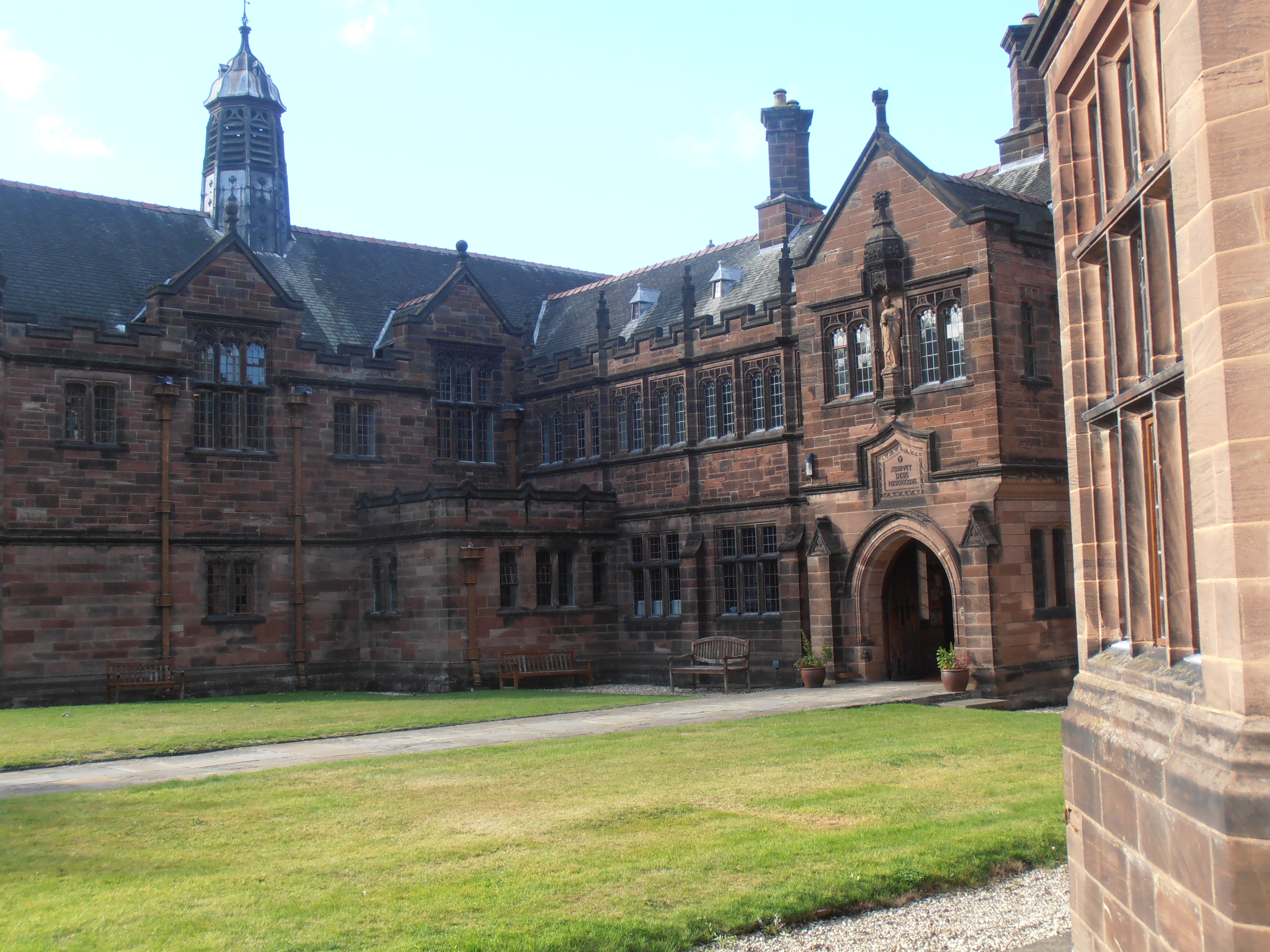
Gladstone's Library

Shotwick Solar Park

== Railways ==
Located on the North Wales Coast Line (Holyhead to Chester) with services run by Avanti West Coast and Transport for Wales specifically calling at Flintshire stations such as Flint and Shotton with an interchange at Shotton with the Borderlands Line, which links it and other Flintshire stations with the Liverpool area and Wrexham.

== Industry ==
Parts of Flintshire have major manufacturing industries. Amongst these are an advanced Toyota plant that manufactures engines, Eren Paper, and Airbus UK, making the wings for the A320, A330 and A350 aircraft at Broughton.

There are daily flights of the Airbus BelugaXL transport aircraft of Airbus wings from Broughton.

Flintshire is also known for its internet companies, the largest and most well known being Moneysupermarket.com based in Ewloe.

Flintshire included much of the North Wales Coalfield, with the last colliery at Point of Ayr closing in 1996.

Flintshire is home to Shotwick Solar Park, the largest photovoltaic solar array in the UK when it was built in 2016. It covers 250 acres of the south western edge of the Wirral Peninsula near the Cheshire village of Shotwick. It has a maximum generating capacity of 72.2 MW and is connected directly to the largest paper-mill in the UK, UPM Shotton Paper.

Flintshire was home to a thriving steel industry with many of the local communities and homes being built around this sector. Steelmaking came to an end in 1980 with the loss of 6500 on one day. The Shotton Steelworks site, now owned by Tata Steel, continues to produce coated steel products, mainly for the construction industry.

== Fairtrade ==
On 19 November 2004, Flintshire was granted Fairtrade County status.

== Education ==
Flintshire County Council is the Local Education Authority of Flintshire. It runs 72 primary schools, 2 special schools and 11 secondary schools. Six of the primary schools and one comprehensive are Welsh medium schools.

Four of the secondary schools have come together with Coleg Cambria to form the Deeside Consortium.

In December 2022, the Climate Change Committee met and Buckley Bistre West councillor Carolyn Preece recommended weekly vegan school meals in the local schools to combat climate change.

== Media ==
Flintshire's local newspapers include two daily titles, North Wales Daily Post and The Leader.

There are two radio stations broadcast in the area – Communicorp station Heart North and Mid Wales and Global Radio station Capital North West and Wales broadcast from the studios based in Wrexham. Whilst BBC Cymru Wales runs a studio and newsroom for their radio, television and online services located at Glyndŵr University but does not base their broadcasting there.

Local TV coverage is mainly served by BBC Wales and ITV Cymru Wales with BBC North West and ITV Granada can be also received. Television signals in the county are received from the Moel-y-Parc transmitter which is situated close to Caerwys, Winter Hill transmitter can also be received as well as the Storeton relay transmitter which is transmitted from both transmitters.

An online news website covering the Flintshire area, Deeside.com, operates from Deeside.

== Politics and government ==
Flintshire is represented by six members of the Senedd (Welsh Parliament). Hannah Blythyn of Welsh Labour has served as the member for the Delyn constituency since the 2016 election, and Jack Sargeant, also of Welsh Labour has served as the member for the Alyn and Deeside constituency since the 2018 by-election.

Both constituencies have continuously elected Welsh Labour MSs at every election since 1999.

A further four members representing the wider region are elected to the Welsh Parliament by proportional representation via a Closed list system, 2 from the Welsh Conservatives, 1 from Plaid Cymru, and 1 from Welsh Labour.

The two UK Parliament constituencies covering Flintshire (in pink) from 2024. 1 = Clwyd East and 2 = Alyn and Deeside.

Flintshire has been traditionally a Labour Party stronghold, but in the 2019 general election, the Welsh Conservatives won the Delyn constituency.

The Alyn and Deeside constituency is a historically and still is a Welsh Labour Party constituency, which is represented by Mark Tami.

Since 2024, Flintshire is covered by two UK parliament constituencies, Alyn and Deeside and Clwyd East, with Delyn abolished. Both parliamentary seats are held by the Labour Party. The Senedd, since 2026, uses the two Senedd constituencies of Clwyd and Fflint Wrecsam to cover the county.

== Notable people ==
See Category:People from Flintshire

- Gareth Allen (born 1988 in Mynydd Isa, near Buckley), former professional snooker player.
- Saint Asaph, 6th century Christian saint, the first Bishop of St Asaph
- Claire Fox (born 1960), writer, journalist, lecturer and politician; grew up in Buckley
- William Ewart Gladstone (1809–1898), 12 years as Prime Minister; retired to Hawarden Castle.
- Jade Jones (born 1993 Bodelwyddan), taekwondo athlete; 2012 and 2016 Olympic gold medallist
- Michael Owen (born 1979), footballer with 362 club caps and 89 for England went to school in Hawarden
- Ian Rush (born 1961 in St Asaph), footballer with 602 club caps and 73 for Wales
- Gary Speed (1969 in Mancot – 2011), footballer and manager with 677 club caps and 85 for Wales
- Frances Williams (c. 1760–1801), first Welsh woman to settle in Australia
- Sir Jonathan Pryce (born John Price; 1 June 1947, Holywell)

== International relations ==
Flintshire has one formal twinning arrangement with:

- Menden, Germany

== See also ==
- List of Lord Lieutenants of Flintshire
- List of High Sheriffs of Flintshire
- List of Scheduled Monuments in Flintshire
- List of churches in Flintshire

== Sources ==
- Harris, B. E.; Thacker, A. T. (1987), The Victoria History of the County of Chester. (Volume 1: Physique, Prehistory, Roman, Anglo-Saxon, and Domesday), Oxford: Oxford University Press, ISBN 0-19-722761-9
