= Clubmoor =

Neighborhood in Liverpool, England

Coordinates: 53.435°N 2.929°W

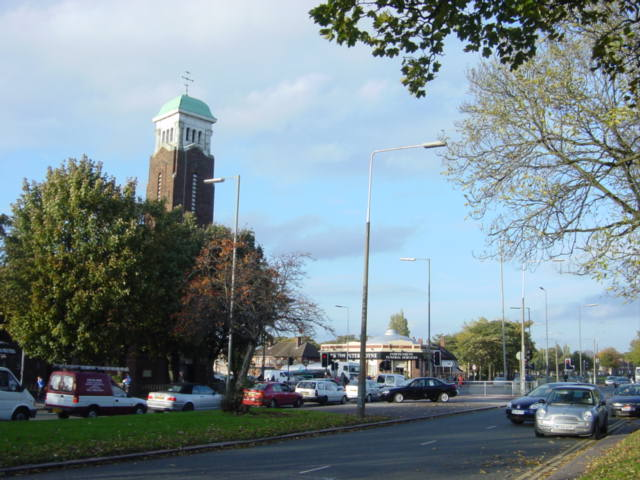
- St Matthew's Catholic Church on Queens Drive, Clubmoor, Liverpool (October 2005)

- Location within Merseyside
- OS grid reference: SJ3895
- Metropolitan borough: Liverpool
- Metropolitan county: Merseyside
- Region: North West
- Country: England
- Sovereign state: United Kingdom
- Post town: LIVERPOOL
- Postcode district: L4, L11, L13
- Dialling code: 0151
- Police: Merseyside
- Fire: Merseyside
- Ambulance: North West
- UK Parliament: Liverpool Walton

Clubmoor is a neighbourhood of Liverpool, Merseyside, England, in the Liverpool City Council ward of Clubmoor. It is part of the Liverpool Walton parliamentary constituency since 2010; before then the ward had fallen under Liverpool West Derby since 1955.

At the 2001 Census, the population of Clubmoor ward was recorded as 13,387. The ward is heavily residential but with a few areas of employment such as the district centre known locally as "Broadway" situated on Broadway/Broad Lane.

As a Liverpool City Council ward, it is represented by three Labour Party councillors - Roz Gladden, Tim Jeeves and Sarah Morton. The local Member of Parliament is Labour MP Dan Carden.

== Description ==
The Clubmoor area is situated in north-east Liverpool and is bordered by the nearby districts of Norris Green, Anfield and Tuebrook. The main Liverpool inner ring-road Queens Drive (A5058) passes through Clubmoor.

Transport wise, Clubmoor is well served by buses on the routes to Liverpool city centre and also on Queens Drive. Until 1960 it was served by Clubmoor railway station on the old loop line.

Schools in the area include Roscoe Primary School.

== History ==
=== Ammunition train incident ===
During the Liverpool Blitz, a notable incident of the area was the ammunition train explosion of 1940. The train was leaving the docks in order to avoid the bombing, but it was hit near Breck Road railway station with the explosion sent the debris flying in all directions. A train wheel smashed through the doorway of a pub, killing the manager. The driver of the train, George Roberts acted extremely selflessly and managed to detach the back end of the train and sent it away to stop it from catching fire. One of the men was off duty railwayman John Guinan from Witton Road who ran to help as soon as he heard the blast. To this day, many of the surrounding houses have been affected by the blast.

=== Post 1945-Present day ===
During the 1950s, US Troops from RAF Burtonwood and RAF Sealand used the open spaces in Clubmoor for playing baseball. This land as well as the nearby Breckside park depot was also used for storing Tanks, Ack Ack guns, Landing crafts etc. there to prepare them for shipping to Europe and Africa. Houses were also built next to the railway depot with the streets with American States as names.
