= Roscoe Primary School =

Location
- Alison Road; Liverpool, Merseyside, L13 9AD; England; 53.431106°N 2.928633°W

Information
- Type: Academy
- Motto: Sharing Learning Together
- Established: 1924
- Local authority: Liverpool City Council
- Trust: Northern Schools Trust
- Department for Education URN: 145360 Tables
- Ofsted: Reports
- Headteacher: Mrs. P. Jones
- Gender: Coeducational
- Age: 2 to 11
- Enrolment: 257
- Colour
- Website: http://roscoeliverpool.co.uk/

Roscoe Primary School is a coeducational primary school located in the Clubmoor area of Liverpool, England. The Headteacher of the School is Mrs. P. Jones who replaced Mrs. K. Hutchings. The school is based in a 1920s building and has been recently been improved to make it easier for disabled people to access the school some changes include ramps, a lift and a step lift for internal floors.

Previously a community school administered by Liverpool City Council, in March 2018 Roscoe Primary School converted to academy status. The school is now sponsored by the Northern Schools Trust

== History ==
The school opened in 1924 as Lisburn Lane School and the headmistress at that time was Blanche Pearce. During the Liverpool Blitz, the school was heavily damaged and parts of the school were destroyed by an incendiary bomb. An unexploded bomb was dropped on the main playground but was disabled before it caused wreckage. As of today, students celebrate VE Day every year, and several students visit St. Luke's Church during VE Day.

== Pupils ==
The school's pupils are children aged 2 – 11. The school has 257 students as of January 2016.

== Facilities ==
Roscoe has a range of different facilities including, an I.C.T. Suite, a Butterfly Garden and an Adventure Trail to name but a few. The butterfly garden opened in 2006 and also has a small pond filled with frogs. The school collects caterpillars and put them in the gardens for them to hatch into butterflies. The adventure trail is a small assault course in the field on the main playground. It was installed in 2009 and most of the children play on it. Since then it has been replaced by new playground equipment
