= Becky Gittins =

British politician

Becky Gittins MP
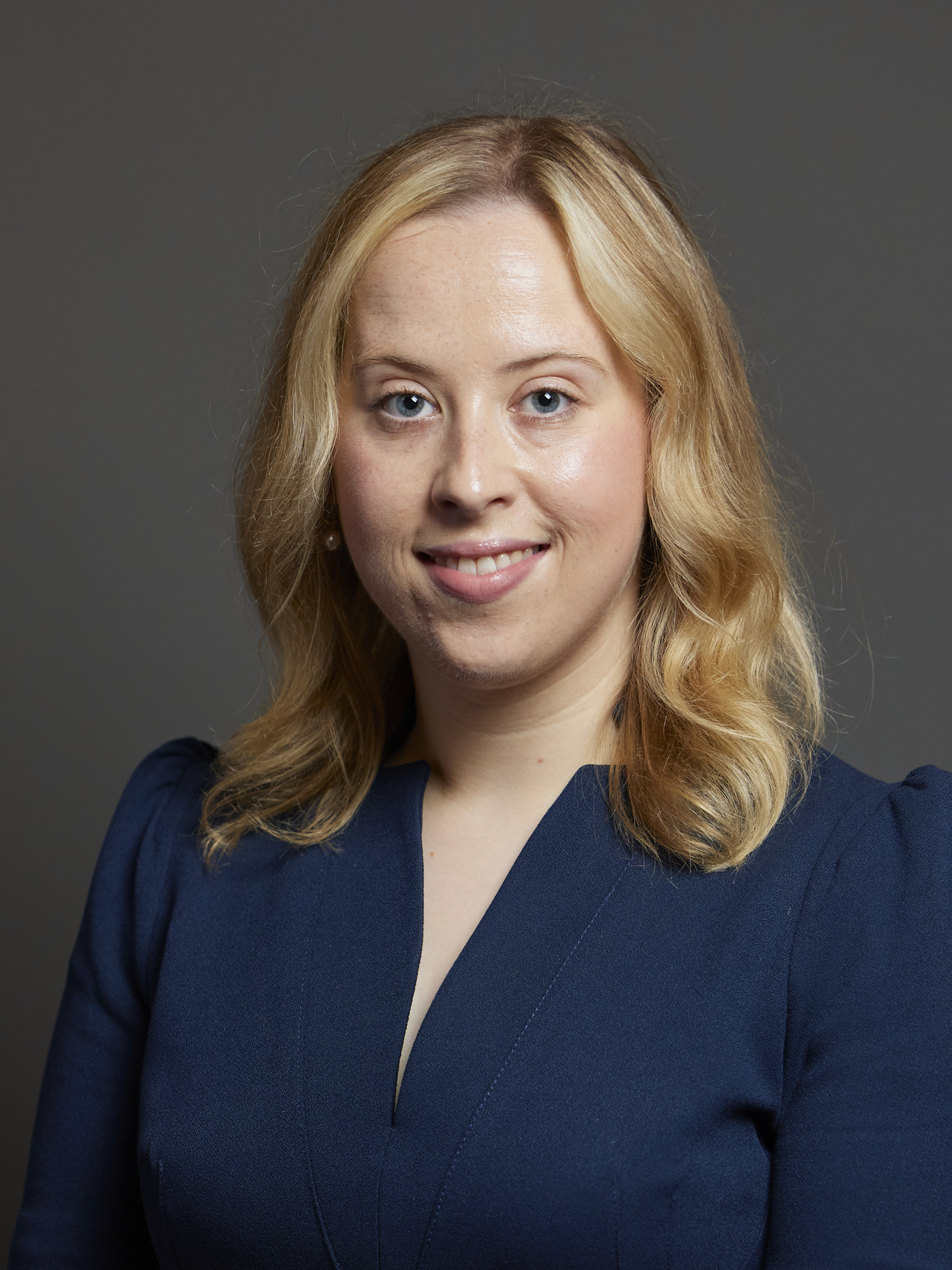
- Official portrait, 2024

Member of Parliament for Clwyd East
- Incumbent
- Assumed office 4 July 2024
- Preceded by: Constituency created
- Majority: 4,622 (9.7%)

Personal details
- Party: Labour
- Education: University of Warwick

Rebecca Gittins (born 1994) is a British Labour Party politician who has served as Member of Parliament for Clwyd East since 2024. She gained the seat by beating incumbent Conservative MP, James Davies.

== Early life and education ==
Gittins was raised in Bagillt, North Wales. She attended Flint High School and the Alun School, Mold, before studying at the University of Warwick.

After graduating, she trained as an accountant and later worked in finance. She subsequently became a trade union negotiator within the civil service, representing workers during the COVID-19 pandemic and helping to secure pay rises during the cost-of-living crisis.

Gittins served as a Labour councillor for the Earlsdon ward on Coventry City Council from May 2019 until September 2023, sitting on scrutiny boards, the licensing committee, and serving as deputy cabinet member for children and young people. She resigned her council seat to contest the new Clwyd East constituency in the 2024 general election.

== Political career ==
Gittins was elected the first MP for Clwyd East on 4 July 2024 with a majority of 4,622 votes (9.7%). She delivered her maiden speech in the House of Commons in September 2024.

Gittins serves as the (unpaid) parliamentary private secretary to the Secretary of State for Wales.

An advocate for allergy awareness, Gittins has spoken about her personal experiences with allergies and works with Allergy UK to campaign for improved services and education. In July 2025, she secured a Backbench Business debate on children’s allergy safety in schools and introduced a Ten-Minute Rule motion on infant allergy guidance.

== Personal life ==
Gittins lives in Clwyd East with her husband.

Parliament of the United Kingdom
New constituency	Member of Parliament for Clwyd East; 2024–present	Incumbent
