= Ian Johnston (police commissioner) =

Gwent Police and Crime Commissioner (born 1952)

Ian Johnston QPM
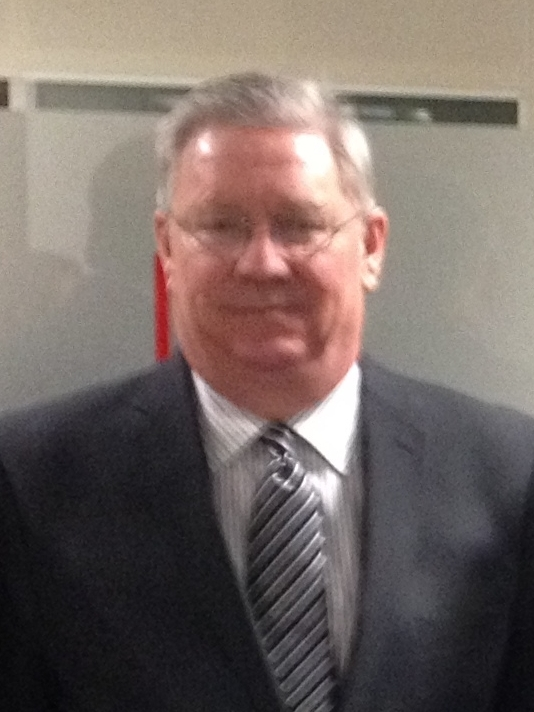
- Johnston in 2013

Gwent Police and Crime Commissioner
- In office 22 November 2012 – 11 May 2016
- Preceded by: Office created
- Succeeded by: Jeff Cuthbert

Personal details
- Born: June 1952
- Died: 15 February 2023 (aged 70) Heath Hospital, Cardiff
- Party: Independent

Ian Brian Johnston (6 June 1952 – 15 February 2023) was the Independent Gwent Police and Crime Commissioner. He was the first person to hold the post and was elected on 15 November 2012. He did not seek re-election in 2016.

== Background ==
Johnston was born on 6 June 1952 in Gwent where he was brought up. He was educated at Pontllanfraith Grammar School. He often described himself as having been "born and bred in the County of Gwent".

== Policing career ==
Johnston joined the Gwent Constabulary in 1970 following service as a Police Cadet.and served as a police officer from 1971 until 2004.

Following Service in uniform he became a detective at Abertillery. As a sergeant he served in the training department and as an inspector he became the staff officer to the Chief Constable John E. Over Johnston returned to the CID on promotion to chief inspector and then as a superintendent he was seconded to the Police Requirements Support Unit at the Home Office. Johnston returned to Gwent as a detective superintendent prior to his promotion to detective chief superintendent in charge of the force's CID. He was head of CID in Gwent Police from 1994 until 1999, and was awarded the Queen's Police Medal for distinguished service in 2003.

He later served as President of the Police Superintendents' Association of England and Wales from 2007 to 2010. He was credited with developing diversity within the superintending ranks and with negotiating improved pay and conditions for police officers as a member of "Staff Side" of the Police Negotiation Board.

His platform at the PCC election in 2012 was to "Keep Politics out of Policing". During his period of office, Johnston reopened several Police stations improving public access to the Police in Gwent and he also launched the force's Victims Charter. He led for the Association of Police and Crime Commissioners (APCC) on the 'Official Side' of the Police Negotiation Board to introduce improvements in the pay and conditions of service for police officers. Johnston retired as Police and Crime Commissioner on 7 May 2016.

Johnston died on 15 February 2023 at the Heath Hospital, Cardiff, after a fall earlier that week.

Following his retirement as Gwent's PCC, Johnston became the Chair of his local and regional Crime Stoppers Charity.

== Personal life ==
Johnston married Janet in 1972 and they have three children: Hayley, Mark and Peter.

Johnston was awarded the Queen's Police Medal in the 2003 Birthday Honours in recognition of his distinguished services to policing.

== Controversy over resignation of Chief Constable ==
In June 2013 Johnston was criticised by local MPs Wayne David and Paul Flynn for his actions in causing the resignation of the Chief Constable of Gwent Police, Carmel Napier. Johnston criticised Napier's management style, saying that their relationship "was never going to work," and confirmed that he had told her to either retire or "be removed." Johnston and Napier both later gave evidence to the Home Affairs Select Committee, which discussed the circumstances of her retirement. The Select Committee report criticised Johnston's "disdainful attitude towards scrutiny by Parliament, as well as an indication of a clear over-sensitivity to criticism". It said that Johnston had been elected by less than 8% of the local electorate, and "had managed to side-step the statutory arrangements for local scrutiny of his decision to sack the chief constable".
