= Gwent County Council =

Welsh local governing body (1974–1996)

Gwent County Council Cyngor Sir Gwent
- Coat of arms of the county council, inherited from Monmouthshire CC

History
- Founded: 1 April 1974; 51 years ago
- Disbanded: 31 March 1996; 29 years ago
- Preceded by: Monmouthshire County Council (1889-1974); Newport County Borough Council (1891-1974); Breconshire County Council (part) (1889-1974)
- Succeeded by: Blaenau Gwent County Borough Council; Caerphilly County Borough Council; Monmouthshire County Council; Newport County Borough Council; Torfaen County Borough Council

Elections
- First election: 12 April 1973
- Last election: May 1993

Meeting place
- County Hall, Cwmbran, from 1977

Gwent County Council (Welsh: Cyngor Sir Gwent) was the upper-tier local authority that governed the county of Gwent in South Wales from its creation in 1974 to its abolition in 1996. For most of its existence, the county council was based in Cwmbran.

== History ==
Gwent County Council was created on 1 April 1974 under the Local Government Act 1972. It took over the geographical area and main roles of the previous councils, Monmouthshire County Council (1889–1974) and Newport County Borough Council (1891–1974), subject to some boundary changes along the western border. Five district councils provided a second tier of government, namely Blaenau Gwent, Islwyn, Monmouth, Newport and Torfaen.

== Political control ==
The first election to the county council was held on 12 April 1973, initially operating as a shadow authority alongside the outgoing authorities until it came into its powers on 1 April 1974. Political control of the council from 1974 until its abolition in 1996 was as follows:

Party in control	Years
Labour	1974–1977
No overall control	1977–1981
Labour	1981–1996

The first Chief Executive of Gwent County Council was James Bray, who had previously been deputy clerk of Monmouthshire County Council. The Chairman of Gwent County Council from 1974 was 78-year-old Councillor Barney O'Neill, who had previously been a representative on Monmouthshire County Council and Chepstow Urban District Council.

== Elections ==
At the first election in 1973, 78 councillors were elected from 66 electoral divisions. The number of councillors was reduced to 63 in 1989.

Year	Seats	Labour	Conservative	Liberal Democrats (Note: Includes Liberals and SDP pre-1988)	Plaid Cymru	Independent	Others	Notes
1973	78	59	12	3	1	1	2	
1977	78	36	27	1	2	6	5	
1981	78	63	12	1	1	1	-	
1985	78	65	9	1	1	-	-	
1989	63	55	7	-	-	1	-	New division boundaries.
1993	63	55	6	1	1	-	-	

== Premises ==
The council was initially based at the old Monmouthshire County Council's headquarters at Shire Hall in Newport, while a new headquarters was being built in Cwmbran. The new County Hall was on Turnpike Road in Croesyceiliog, on the eastern outskirts of Cwmbran, and was completed in 1977.
