= Cwmbran Central =

Community in Cwmbran

Coordinates: 51°38′49″N 3°01′49″W

- Community
- Principal area: Torfaen
- Country: Wales
- Sovereign state: United Kingdom
- Police: Gwent
- Fire: South Wales
- Ambulance: Welsh
- List of places UK Wales Torfaen Map of the community

Cwmbran Central (Welsh: Cwmbrân Ganol) is a community in Cwmbran, Torfaen, Wales. It had a population of 9,947 as of the 2011 United Kingdom census.
