= Blaenau Gwent Caerffili Rhymni =

Senedd constituency (from 2026)

- County multi-member constituency for the Senedd
- Boundary of Blaenau Gwent Caerffili Rhymni in Wales
- Principal areas: Blaenau Gwent; Caerphilly County Borough
- Preserved county: Gwent
- Population: 192,579 (2024)
- Major settlements: Abertillery, Bargoed, Caerphilly, Rhymney

Current County multi-member constituency
- Created: 2026
- Seats: 6
- Created from: UK Parliament boundaries: Blaenau Gwent and Rhymney; Caerphilly; Previous Senedd constituencies: Blaenau Gwent; Caerphilly; Merthyr Tydfil and Rhymney; Islwyn; Previous Senedd region: South Wales East

Blaenau Gwent Caerffili Rhymni (Welsh for 'Blaenau Gwent, Caerphilly, [and] Rhymney';) is a six-member constituency of the Senedd (Welsh Parliament; Welsh: Senedd Cymru) used in the 2026 Senedd election. It covers areas in the south-east of Wales, particularly parts of Blaenau Gwent and Caerphilly.

It was proposed following the 2026 review of Senedd constituencies, and is a pairing of the two UK Parliament constituencies of Blaenau Gwent and Rhymney and Caerphilly. It has a Welsh-only name.

== Boundaries ==
A Senedd constituency comprising the boundaries of the UK Parliament constituencies of Blaenau Gwent and Rhymney and Caerphilly, has been proposed by the Democracy and Boundary Commission Cymru for the 2026 election to the Senedd (Welsh Parliament; Senedd Cymru). It was initially proposed using the English name Blaenau Gwent, Rhymney and Caerphilly in September 2024, but was renamed to Blaenau Gwent Caerffili Rhymni in December proposals with most constituencies using Welsh-only names. The Welsh-only name and boundaries were confirmed in the commission's final recommendations in March 2025. When announcing their candidates, Reform UK used "Blaenau Gwent and Rhymney, Caerphilly" instead, using the English names for the pair of UK Parliament constituencies that form it.

It encompasses entirely the principal area (county borough) of Blaenau Gwent and parts of Caerphilly County Borough in South Wales. The constituency was established in 2026, following the passing of the Senedd Cymru (Members and Elections) Act 2024. The act legislates electoral reform of the Senedd to create 16 larger "super constituencies", pairing the 32 UK Parliament constituencies in Wales, and using a new fully proportional voting system, with each constituency electing six Members of the Senedd (MSs) rather than one previously.

== Members of the Senedd ==
| Term | Election | Distribution | MS | MS | MS | MS | MS | MS |
|---|---|---|---|---|---|---|---|---|
| 7th | 2026 | 3 / 3 | Delyth Jewell (PC) | Llŷr Powell (Ref) | Lindsay Whittle (PC) | Catherine Cullen (Ref) | Niamh Salkeld (PC) | Joshua Kim (Ref) |

== Elections ==
=== Elections in the 2020s ===
2026 Senedd election: Blaenau Gwent Caerffili Rhymni
| Party | Candidate | Votes | % | ±% |
|---|---|---|---|---|
| Plaid Cymru | Delyth Jewell(elected 1) Lindsay Whittle(elected 3) Niamh Salkeld(elected 5) Catrin Moss Charlotte Bishop Steve Skivens | 29,314 | 42.0 | +19.6 |
| Reform | Llŷr Powell (elected 2) Catherine Cullen(elected 4) Joshua Kim(elected 6) Jonathan Parker Glenda Marie Davies Barclay Nickels | 23,955 | 34.3 | +32.7 |
| Labour | Alun Davies Richard Tunnicliffe Keiran Russell Sara Beard Simon Dancey John Pettit Hero Marsden | 7,739 | 11.1 | −36.4 |
| Conservative | Gareth John Potter Janet Elizabeth Butler John Child David John West Martin Jason Newell Fay Bromfield | 3,353 | 4.8 | −10.4 |
| Green | Anne Baker Alexis Celnik Rachel Roberts Hannah Garcia Aidan Dempsey Jamie Payne | 2,447 | 3.5 | +3.5 |
| Liberal Democrats | Steve Aicheler David Scullin Catherine Dowden-King Steve Lloyd Ivan Westley Juliet Price | 1,284 | 1.8 | −0.4 |
| Independent | Jordan Brace | 931 | 1.3 | +1.3 |
| Independent | Mike Whatley | 374 | 0.5 | +0.5 |
| Heritage | Jared Burgess | 262 | 0.4 | +0.4 |
| Open Party (UK) | Karen Horan | 102 | 0.1 | +0.1 |
| Independent | Steve Wright | 71 | 0.1 | +0.1 |
| Majority | | 5,359 | 7.7 | |
| Turnout | | 69,832 | 47.6% | +5.9 |
| Registered electors | | 146,732 | | |
| Plaid Cymru win (new seat) | | | | |

2021 notional result (Note: Estimate of the 2021 Senedd election result as if the revised boundaries recommended under the 2026 boundary review were in place)
| Party | Vote | % | Seats |
|---|---|---|---|
| Labour | 29,085 | 47.5 | 4 |
| Plaid Cymru | 13,705 | 22.4 | 1 |
| Conservative | 9,310 | 15.2 | 1 |
| Independent | 3,765 | 6.2 | 0 |
| Abolish | 2,738 | 4.5 | 0 |
| Liberal Democrats | 1,345 | 2.2 | 0 |
| Reform UK | 1,004 | 1.6 | 0 |
| UKIP | 227 | 0.4 | 0 |
