= Caerphilly (Senedd constituency) =

Senedd constituency (1999–2026)

Coordinates: 51.579°N 3.218°W

Caerphilly Caerffili
- Former Senedd county constituency for the Senedd
- Caerphilly shown as one of the 40; Senedd constituencies

Former Senedd county constituency
- Created: 1999
- Abolished: 2026
- Electoral region: South Wales East
- Replaced by: Blaenau Gwent Caerffili Rhymni

Caerphilly (Welsh: Caerffili) was a constituency of the Senedd. It elected one Member of the Senedd by the first past the post method of election. It was additionally one of eight constituencies in the South Wales East electoral region, which elected four additional members, in addition to eight constituency members, to produce a degree of proportional representation for the region as a whole.

== Boundaries ==
Map of 1999–2026 boundaries

The constituency was created for the first election to the Assembly, in 1999, with the name and boundaries of the Caerphilly Westminster constituency prior to the 2023 review of Westminster constituencies.

The other seven constituencies of the South Wales East electoral region were Blaenau Gwent, Islwyn, Merthyr Tydfil and Rhymney, Monmouth, Newport East, Newport West and Torfaen.

== Voting ==
In general elections for the Senedd, each voter had two votes. The first vote was used to vote for a candidate to become the Member of the Senedd for the voter's constituency, elected by the first past the post system. The second vote was used to vote for a regional closed party list of candidates. Additional member seats were allocated from the lists by the d'Hondt method, with constituency results being taken into account in the allocation.

== Assembly members and Members of the Senedd ==
| Election | Member | Party |
|---|---|---|
| 1999 | Ron Davies | Labour |
| 2003 | Jeffrey Cuthbert | Labour |
| 2016 | Hefin David | Labour |
| 2025 by-election | Lindsay Whittle | Plaid Cymru |

== Results ==
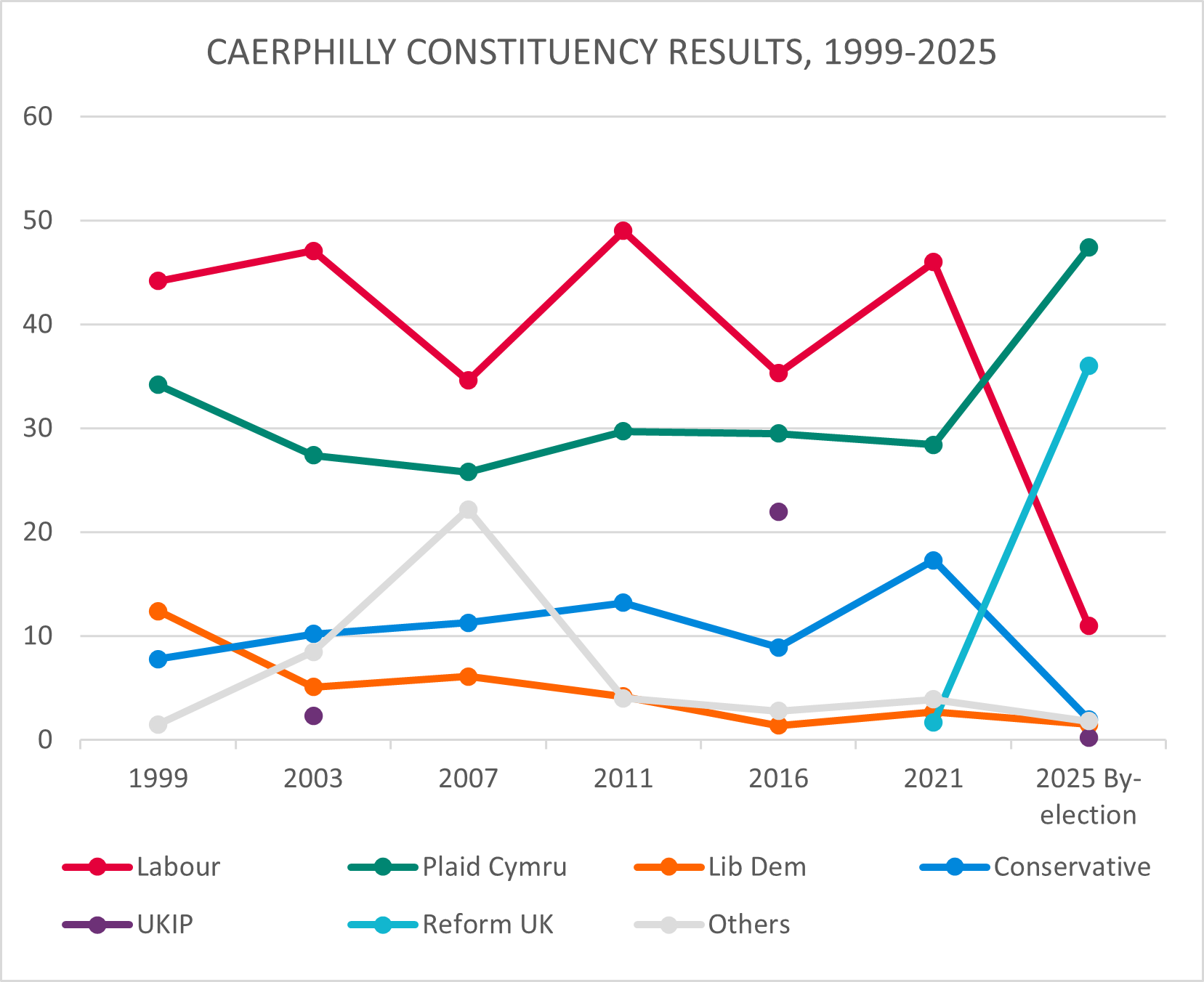
Election results since 1999 (parties who never got >5% counted as others)

=== Elections in the 2020s ===
A by-election was held on Thursday 23 October 2025, following the death of Hefin David in August 2025.

2025 Caerphilly by-election
| Party | Candidate | Votes | % | ±% |
|---|---|---|---|---|
| Plaid Cymru | Lindsay Whittle | 15,961 | 47.4 | +19.0 |
| Reform | Llŷr Powell | 12,113 | 36.0 | +34.2 |
| Labour | Richard Tunnicliffe | 3,713 | 11.0 | −34.9 |
| Conservative | Gareth Potter | 690 | 2.0 | −15.3 |
| Green | Gareth Hughes | 516 | 1.5 | New |
| Liberal Democrats | Steven Aicheler | 497 | 1.5 | −1.2 |
| Gwlad | Anthony Cook | 117 | 0.3 | New |
| UKIP | Roger Quilliam | 79 | 0.2 | New |
| Majority | | 3,848 | 11.4 | N/A |
| Turnout | | 33,689 | 50.43 | +6.12 |
| Registered electors | | 66,895 | | |
| Plaid Cymru gain from Labour | | Swing | +26.95 | |

2021 Senedd election: Caerphilly
| Party | Candidate | Constituency | | | Regional | | |
| Party | Candidate | Votes | % | ±% | Votes | % | ±% |
|---|---|---|---|---|---|---|---|
| Labour | Hefin David (Note: Incumbent member for this constituency) | 13,289 | 46.0 | +10.7 | 11,230 | 38.7 | +4.0 |
| Plaid Cymru | Delyth Jewell | 8,211 | 28.4 | –1.1 | 8,277 | 28.5 | +2.6 |
| Conservative | Steven Mayfield | 5,013 | 17.3 | +8.4 | 5,172 | 17.8 | +7.7 |
| Abolish | Stephen Jones | 1,119 | 3.9 | New | 1,134 | 3.9 | +0.8 |
| Green | | | | | 1,074 | 3.7 | +1.3 |
| Liberal Democrats | Steven Aicheler | 787 | 2.7 | +1.3 | 644 | 2.2 | +0.3 |
| Reform | Tim Price | 495 | 1.7 | New | 342 | 1.2 | New |
| UKIP | | | | | 505 | 1.7 | –18.8 |
| Gwlad | | | | | 180 | 0.6 | New |
| No More Lockdowns | | | | | 174 | 0.6 | New |
| Propel | | | | | 115 | 0.4 | New |
| Communist | | | | | 86 | 0.3 | ±0.0 |
| TUSC | | | | | 71 | 0.2 | –0.1 |
| Majority | | 5,078 | 17.6 | +11.8 | | | |
| Turnout | | 28,914 | 44.31 | +1.0 | | | |
| Labour hold | | Swing | | | | | |
Notes

Regional Ballot void votes: 145. Want of an Official Mark (0), Voting for more than ONE party or individual candidate (71), Writing or mark by which the Voter could be identified (4), Unmarked or Void for uncertainty (145)

=== Elections in the 2010s ===
Welsh Assembly Election 2016: Caerphilly
| Party | Candidate | Constituency | | | Regional | | |
| Party | Candidate | Votes | % | ±% | Votes | % | ±% |
|---|---|---|---|---|---|---|---|
| Labour | Hefin David | 9,584 | 35.3 | –13.7 | 9,416 | 34.7 | –9.3 |
| Plaid Cymru | Lindsay Whittle | 8,009 | 29.5 | –0.2 | 7,013 | 25.9 | –0.4 |
| UKIP | Sam Gould | 5,954 | 22.0 | New | 5,555 | 20.5 | +16.7 |
| Conservative | Jane Pratt | 2,412 | 8.9 | −4.3 | 2,728 | 10.1 | –1.7 |
| Green | Andrew Creak | 770 | 2.8 | New | 651 | 2.4 | +0.2 |
| Liberal Democrats | Aladdin Ayesh | 386 | 1.4 | –2.8 | 526 | 1.9 | –1.7 |
| Abolish | | | | | 830 | 3.1 | New |
| Monster Raving Loony | | | | | 177 | 0.7 | New |
| TUSC | | | | | 91 | 0.3 | New |
| Communist | | | | | 74 | 0.3 | ±0.0 |
| National Front | | | | | 50 | 0.2 | New |
| Majority | | 1,575 | 5.8 | –13.5 | | | |
| Turnout | | 27,115 | 43.3 | +1.8 | | | |
| Labour hold | | Swing | | | | | |

Welsh Assembly Election 2011: Caerphilly
| Party | Candidate | Constituency | | | Regional | | |
| Party | Candidate | Votes | % | ±% | Votes | % | ±% |
|---|---|---|---|---|---|---|---|
| Labour | Jeffrey Cuthbert | 12,521 | 49.0 | +14.4 | 11,251 | 44.0 | +6.7 |
| Plaid Cymru | Ronald Davies | 7,597 | 29.7 | +3.9 | 6,717 | 26.3 | +2.2 |
| Conservative | Owen Meredith | 3,368 | 13.2 | +1.9 | 3,016 | 11.8 | –0.3 |
| Liberal Democrats | Kay David | 1,062 | 4.2 | –1.9 | 917 | 3.6 | –2.3 |
| BNP | Anthony King | 1,022 | 4.0 | New | 1,042 | 4.1 | –1.0 |
| UKIP | | | | | 983 | 3.8 | –0.8 |
| Socialist Labour | | | | | 633 | 2.5 | +1.1 |
| Green | | | | | 551 | 2.2 | –0.6 |
| Welsh Christian | | | | | 335 | 1.3 | ±0.0 |
| Communist | | | | | 77 | 0.3 | –0.1 |
| English Democrat | | | | | 38 | 0.1 | –0.1 |
| Majority | | 4,924 | 19.3 | +10.5 | | | |
| Turnout | | 25,570 | 41.5 | –0.6 | | | |
| Labour hold | | Swing | +5.2 | | | | |

Regional ballots rejected at the count: 143

=== Elections in the 2000s ===
Welsh Assembly Election 2007: Caerphilly
| Party | Candidate | Constituency | | | Regional | | |
| Party | Candidate | Votes | % | ±% | Votes | % | ±% |
|---|---|---|---|---|---|---|---|
| Labour | Jeffrey Cuthbert | 9,026 | 34.6 | –10.8 | 9,707 | 37.3 | –9.8 |
| Plaid Cymru | Lindsay Whittle | 6,739 | 25.8 | –2.2 | 6,287 | 24.1 | +0.9 |
| Independent | Ronald Davies | 5,806 | 22.2 | New | | | |
| Conservative | Richard Foley | 2,954 | 11.3 | +1.2 | 3,149 | 12.1 | +0.7 |
| Liberal Democrats | Huw Price | 1,596 | 6.1 | +1.1 | 1,601 | 6.1 | –1.4 |
| BNP | | | | | 1,380 | 5.1 | +3.8 |
| UKIP | | | | | 1,201 | 4.6 | +1.2 |
| Independent - Colin Hobbs | | | | | 1,061 | 4.1 | New |
| Green | | | | | 736 | 2.8 | +0.4 |
| Socialist Labour | | | | | 356 | 1.4 | –0.8 |
| Welsh Christian Party | | | | | 347 | 1.3 | New |
| Communist | | | | | 95 | 0.4 | New |
| CPA | | | | | 66 | 0.3 | New |
| English Democrat | | | | | 52 | 0.2 | New |
| Majority | | 2,287 | 8.8 | –10.8 | | | |
| Turnout | | 26,120 | 42.1 | +5.1 | | | |
| Labour hold | | Swing | –4.3 | | | | |

Welsh Assembly Election 2003: Caerphilly
| Party | Candidate | Constituency | | | Regional | | |
| Party | Candidate | Votes | % | ±% | Votes | % | ±% |
|---|---|---|---|---|---|---|---|
| Labour | Jeffrey Cuthbert | 11,893 | 47.1 | +2.9 | 11,956 | 47.1 | +9.5 |
| Plaid Cymru | Lindsay Whittle | 6,919 | 27.4 | –6.8 | 5,893 | 23.2 | –13.6 |
| Conservative | Laura Anne Jones | 2,570 | 10.2 | +2.4 | 2,895 | 11.4 | +2.5 |
| Liberal Democrats | Rob W. Roffe | 1,281 | 5.1 | –7.3 | 1,907 | 7.5 | –4.8 |
| Independent | Anne Blackman | 1,204 | 4.8 | New | | | |
| Independent | Avril A. Dafydd-Lewis | 930 | 3.7 | New | | | |
| UKIP | Brenda M. Vipass | 590 | 2.3 | New | 863 | 3.4 | New |
| Green | | | | | 613 | 2.4 | Unknown |
| Socialist Labour | | | | | 549 | 2.2 | Unknown |
| BNP | | | | | 326 | 1.3 | New |
| Cymru Annibynnol | | | | | 280 | 1.1 | New |
| ProLife Alliance | | | | | 96 | 0.4 | New |
| Majority | | 4,974 | 19.7 | +9.7 | | | |
| Turnout | | 25,387 | 36.8 | –6.4 | | | |
| Labour hold | | Swing | +4.9 | | | | |

2003 Electorate: 68,152
Regional ballots rejected: 316

=== Elections in the 1990s ===
Welsh Assembly Election 1999: Caerphilly
| Party | Candidate | Constituency | | | Regional | | |
| Party | Candidate | Votes | % | ±% | Votes | % | ±% |
|---|---|---|---|---|---|---|---|
| Labour | Ron Davies | 12,602 | 44.2 | N/A | 10,721 | 37.6 | N/A |
| Plaid Cymru | Robert Gough | 9,741 | 34.2 | N/A | 10,508 | 36.8 | N/A |
| Liberal Democrats | Mike German | 3,543 | 12.4 | N/A | 3,496 | 12.3 | N/A |
| Conservative | Mary Taylor | 2,213 | 7.8 | N/A | 2,542 | 8.9 | N/A |
| Socialist Alliance | Timothy Richards | 412 | 1.5 | | | | |
| United Socialist | | | | | 202 | 0.7 | N/A |
| Others | | | | | 1,050 | 3.7 | N/A |
| Majority | | 2,861 | 10.0 | | | | |
| Turnout | | 28,511 | 43.2 | | | | |
| Labour win (new seat) | | | | | | | |
