= List of leaders of Welsh councils =

This is a list of the political leaders of Welsh council areas.

District	Style	Council majority	Council leader
Blaenau Gwent	County borough	Welsh Labour	Steve Thomas (Welsh Labour)
Bridgend	County borough	Welsh Labour	Huw David (Welsh Labour)
Caerphilly	County borough	Welsh Labour	Sean Morgan (Welsh Labour)
Cardiff	City and county	Welsh Labour	Huw Thomas (Welsh Labour)
Carmarthenshire	County	Plaid Cymru	Darren Price (Plaid Cymru)
Ceredigion	County	Plaid Cymru	Bryan Davies (Plaid Cymru)
Conwy	County borough	No overall control	Julie Fallon (Independent)
Denbighshire	County	Welsh Labour	Jason Mckellan (Welsh Labour)
Flintshire	County	No overall control	Ian Roberts (Welsh Labour)
Gwynedd	County	Plaid Cymru	Dyfrig Siencyn (Plaid Cymru)
Isle of Anglesey	County	Plaid Cymru	Llinos Medi (Plaid Cymru)
Merthyr Tydfil	County borough	Independent	Geraint Thomas (Independent)
Monmouthshire	County	Welsh Labour	Mary Ann Brocklesby (Welsh Labour)
Neath Port Talbot	County borough	Independent	Steve Hunt (Independent)
Newport	City	Welsh Labour	Jane Mudd (Welsh Labour)
Pembrokeshire	County	Independent	David Simpson (Non-aligned)
Powys	County	Welsh Liberal Democrats	James Gibson-Watt (Welsh Liberal Democrats)
Rhondda Cynon Taf	County borough	Welsh Labour	Andrew Morgan (Welsh Labour)
Swansea	City and county	Welsh Labour	Rob Stewart (Welsh Labour)
Torfaen	County borough	Welsh Labour	Anthony Hunt (Welsh Labour)
Vale of Glamorgan	County borough	No overall control	Lis Burnett (Welsh Labour)
Wrexham	County borough	No overall control	Mark Pritchard (Independent)
