= Gwent (county) =

Preserved county in south-east Wales

Coordinates: 51.789°N 3.018°W

- Gwent shown within Wales as a preserved county
- Area
  - 2024: 1,551 km²
- Population
  - 2024: 601,686
- History
  - Created: 1974
  - Abolished: 1996
  - Succeeded by: Blaenau Gwent; Caerphilly; Monmouthshire; Newport; Torfaen; Preserved county of Gwent
- Status: Non-metropolitan county (1974–1996) Preserved county (1996–)
- Government: Gwent County Council (1974–1996)
  - HQ: Shire Hall, Newport (1974–1978); County Hall, Cwmbran (1978–1996)

Gwent is a preserved county and former local government county in southeast Wales. A county of Gwent was formed on 1 April 1974, under the Local Government Act 1972; it was named after the ancient Kingdom of Gwent. The authority was a successor to both the administrative county of Monmouthshire (with minor boundary changes) and the county borough of Newport (both authorities which were legally part of England until the Act came into force although considered jointly with Wales for certain purposes).

Under the Local Government (Wales) Act 1994, the county of Gwent was abolished on 1 April 1996. However, the name remains in use for one of the preserved counties of Wales for the ceremonial purposes of Lieutenancy and High Shrievalty, and its name also survives in various titles, e.g. Gwent Police, Royal Gwent Hospital, Gwent Wildlife Trust and Coleg Gwent. "Gwent" is often used as a synonym for the historic county of Monmouthshire – for example the Gwent Family History Society describes itself as "The key to roots in the historic county of Monmouthshire".

The former administrative county was divided into several districts: Blaenau Gwent, Islwyn, Monmouth, Newport and Torfaen. The successor unitary authorities are Blaenau Gwent, Caerphilly (part of which came from Mid Glamorgan), Monmouthshire (which covers the eastern 60% of the historic county of the same name), Newport and Torfaen.

In 2003 the preserved county of Gwent expanded to include the whole of Caerphilly County Borough; the Gwent Police area had already been realigned to these boundaries in 1996. In 2007, the population of this enlarged area was estimated as 560,500, making it the most populous of the preserved counties of Wales.

== See also ==
- Monmouthshire (historic) - the county's main predecessor
- Monmouthshire - the county's main successor
- Gwent County Council
- 1973 Gwent County Council election
- List of Lord Lieutenants of Gwent
- List of High Sheriffs of Gwent
- Gwent Police
- Gwent Police and Crime Commissioner
