= County Hall, Cwmbran =

County building in Cwmbran, Wales

- County Hall

- Location within Torfaen

General information
- Location: Croesyceiliog, Cwmbran, United Kingdom
- Coordinates: 51.6541°N 3.0013°W
- Completed: 1978
- Demolished: 2013

Design and construction
- Architect: Robert Matthew Johnson Marshall

County Hall, Cwmbran (Welsh: Neuadd y Sir Cwmbrân) was a municipal facility on Turnpike Road in Croesyceiliog in Cwmbran in Wales. It was the headquarters of Gwent County Council from 1978 to 1996 and of Monmouthshire County Council from 1996 to 2013.

== History ==
For much of the 20th century Monmouthshire County Council had held its meetings in the Shire Hall in Newport. After finding that the Shire Hall facilities were too cramped, county leaders decided to procure modern facilities: the site they selected was open land to the east of Turnpike Road in Croesyceiliog.

Construction of the new building started in 1969. Following the implementation of the Local Government Act 1972, the new building was destined to become the home of Gwent County Council. It was designed by Robert Matthew Johnson Marshall, built at a cost of £9 million and was officially opened by Queen Elizabeth The Queen Mother on 19 April 1978. The design for the seven-storey building involved a two winged structure; each of the wings featured continuous bands of glazing with concrete panels above and below; there was a separate low-rise structure containing the council chamber and there was a bunker in the basement for the use of county leaders in the case of a nuclear attack.

On 1 April 1996, under the Local Government (Wales) Act 1994, Gwent was abolished and the building was acquired by the newly formed Monmouthshire County Council. However, after the building was found to have concrete cancer, and the potential rectification work required was estimated at £30 million, the county council decided it had no further use for the building.

After the county council had moved to smaller offices at Usk in May 2013, (Note: The new offices at Rhadyr near Usk were built by Willmott Dixon at a cost of £8 million.) County Hall in Cwmbran was demolished and the cleared site was sold to Kier Group for a residential development involving 140 new houses.
