= Joshua Kim =

Welsh politician

Joshua Kim MS
- 김승균
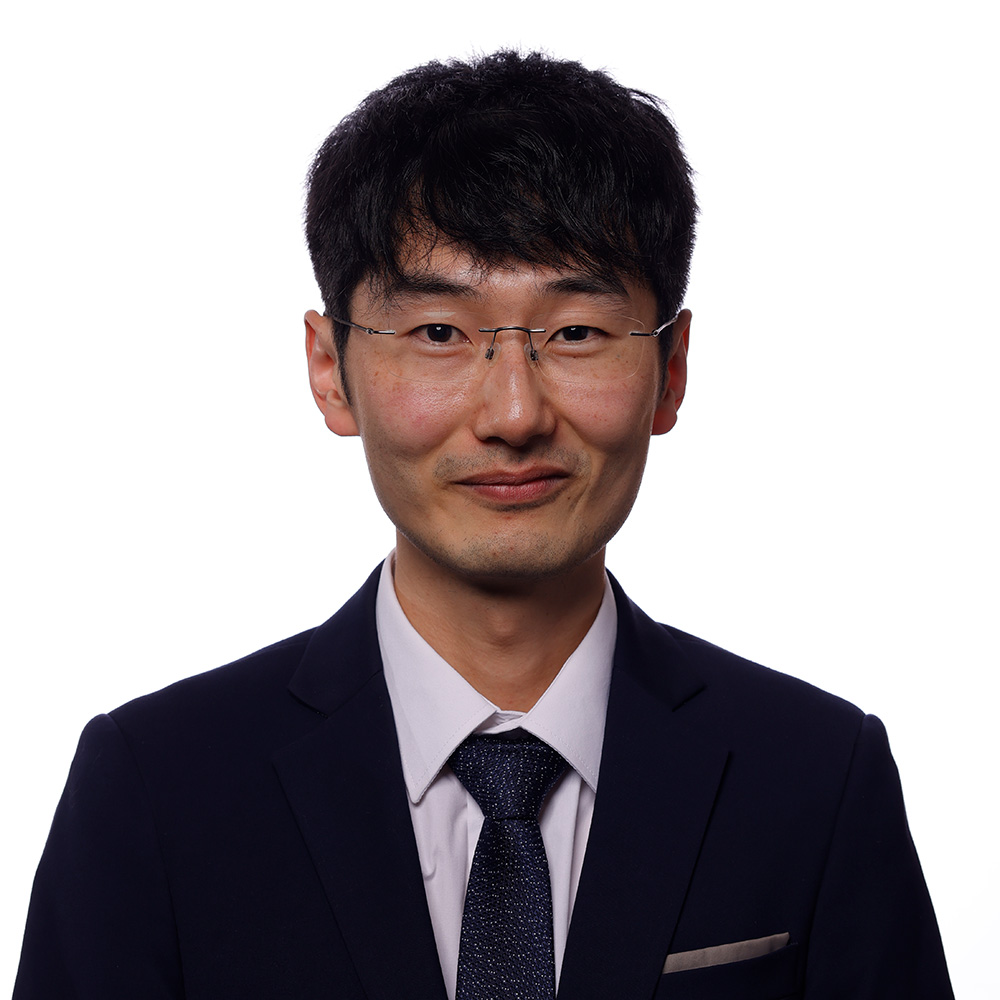
- Official portrait, 2026

Member of the Senedd for Blaenau Gwent Caerffili Rhymni
- Incumbent
- Assumed office 8 May 2026
- Preceded by: Constituency established

Personal details
- Born: Seungkyun Kim South Korea
- Party: Reform UK

Korean name
- Hangul: 김승균
- RR: Gim Seunggyun
- MR: Kim Sŭnggyun

Joshua Seungkyun Kim (Korean: 김승균) is a Welsh Reform UK politician who has served as a Member of the Senedd (MS) for the Blaenau Gwent Caerffili Rhymni constituency since May 2026. Kim is a South Korean immigrant. He was the Reform UK candidate for Caerphilly in the 2024 United Kingdom general election. He was third on the candidate list for Reform UK in the 2026 Senedd election. Kim lives in Machen and previously worked as a teacher at a Catholic faith school in Cardiff. Kim is the first person of Korean descent to become a member of any parliament in the United Kingdom.

Kim arrived late to the count that led to him winning the sixth seat at Blaenau Gwent Caerffili Rhymni, as he was teaching as a supply teacher at the time, opting not to attend the count as it would mean losing a day's pay. Following his seat win, Kim reportedly told reporters that he "did not think for one minute" that he would be elected, appearing "distraught, utterly shocked and confused". This reporting by the BBC is contradicted by the interview Kim gave on his arrival at the count to the Caerphilly Observer, in which he said, “I always knew there was a chance, but I wouldn’t say I was confident. And you can see from the result, it was pretty close."

== See also ==
- 7th Senedd
