= 1973 Gwent County Council election =

1973 Welsh local government election

The 1973 Gwent County Council election was held on Thursday 12 April 1973 to elect councillors to the new Gwent County Council, governing the new county of Gwent, Wales. It took place on the same day as other county council elections in the United Kingdom.

These were the first elections to the new county council, which would come into effect on 1 April 1974. Future elections would take place every four years, with the next one scheduled for April 1977.

The 1973 election saw the Labour Party win a strong majority on the Council.

== Background ==
Gwent was created following local government reorganisation enacted by the Local Government Act 1972. It covered the area of Monmouthshire and Newport County Borough, which would be transferred from England to Wales in 1974.

The 1973 elections were the first to the new local authorities, with councillors acting in a shadow capacity until 1 April 1974 when the new councils took full effect.

The position of alderman on the local authorities was abolished, with all members of the new councils being elected ward councillors.

== Overview of the result ==
Seventy-eight Gwent County Council seats in 66 electoral wards were up for election in April 1973. Labour overall increased its presence in comparison with the old councils, though there were some close battles between Labour, the Liberals and Independents in some wards.

In Cwmbran Labour did not fare so well, with an Independent and a Ratepayer candidate winning seats, and the Conservatives polling strongly.

Gwent County Council election result 1973
Party	Seats	Gains	Losses	Net gain/loss	Seats %	Votes %	Votes	+/−
Labour	59			N/A	75.6			N/A
Conservative	12			N/A	15.3			N/A
Liberal	3			N/A	3.8			N/A
Plaid Cymru	1			N/A	1.2			N/A
Communist	0			N/A	0.0		1,185	N/A
Ratepayers	2			N/A	2.5			N/A
Independent	1			N/A	1.2			N/A

== Ward results ==
Contests took place in 49 wards, with candidates in seventeen of the wards being elected unopposed. (Note: South Wales Echo (13 April 1973) results page also provides some middle initials of candidates, also indicating which candidates are female)

=== Aberbeeg and Six Bells (1 seat) ===
Aberbeeg and Six Bells ward 1973
Party	Candidate	Votes	%	±%
Plaid Cymru	I. Lewis	1,415		
Labour	H. Snellgrove	1,295		
Turnout			58.8	n/a
Registered electors		4,608		

=== Abercarn and Cwmcarn (1 seat) ===
Abercarn and Cwmcarn ward 1973
Party	Candidate	Votes	%	±%
Labour	D. J. Williams	Unopposed		

=== Abergavenny Cantref and Grofield (1 seat) ===
Abergavenny Cantref and Grofield ward 1973
Party	Candidate	Votes	%	±%
Conservative	R. Smith	947		
Labour	P. Stockham	522		
Turnout			39.2	n/a
Registered electors		3,745		

=== Abergavenny Castle and Priory (1 seat) ===
Abergavenny Castle and Priory ward 1973
Party	Candidate	Votes	%	±%
Conservative	P. Williams	1,000		
Labour	J. Pardoe-James	904		
Turnout			56.4	n/a
Registered electors		3,376		

=== Abersychan Central (1 seat) ===
Abersychan Central ward 1973
Party	Candidate	Votes	%	±%
Labour	G. Smith	891		
Communist	G. Williams	222		
Turnout			48.6	n/a
Registered electors		2,288		

=== Abersychan North (1 seat) ===
Abersychan North ward 1973
Party	Candidate	Votes	%	±%
Labour	Gertrude Morgan	891		
Communist	G. Mills	794		
Turnout			57.8	n/a
Registered electors		2.916		

=== Abertillery (1 seat) ===
Abertillery (Note: South Wales Echo (13 April 1973) gives the ward name as "Abertillery No. 2") ward 1973
Party	Candidate	Votes	%	±%
Labour	R. G. Owen	Unopposed		

=== Alexandra (1 seat) ===
Alexandra (Note: South Wales Echo (13 April 1973) gives the ward name as "Newport Alexandra" (per the town's Alexandra Dock area) but the Election Centre calls it "Alexander") (Newport) ward 1973
Party	Candidate	Votes	%	±%
Labour	R. Jones	1,067		
Plaid Cymru	D. Hughes	308		
Turnout			49.1	n/a
Registered electors		2,802		

=== Allt-yr-yn (1 seat) ===
Allt-yr-yn (Newport) ward 1973
Party	Candidate	Votes	%	±%
Conservative	S. Miller	1,464		
Liberal	D. Owen	778		
Labour	S. Seaman	343		
Turnout			48.2	n/a
Registered electors		5,360		

=== Alway (2 seats) ===
Alway (Newport) (Note: South Wales Echo (13 April 1973) gives the ward name as "Newport, Alway") ward 1973
Party	Candidate	Votes	%	±%
Labour	J. Turner	1,718		
Labour	R. Murray	1,439		
Conservative	T. Tranter	951		
Conservative	(Mrs) D. Griffiths	856		
Liberal	H. Clark	834		
Turnout			53.3	n/a
Registered electors		6,569		

=== Bassaleg and Marshfield (1 seat) ===
Bassaleg and Marshfield ward 1973
Party	Candidate	Votes	%	±%
Conservative	P. Grimmer	1,027		
Labour	T. Lewis	638		
Liberal	I. Wasgett	401		
Turnout			46.2	n/a
Registered electors		4,474		

=== Bedwellty No. 2 Pengam (1 seat) ===
Pengam (Note: South Wales Echo (13 April 1973) gives the ward name as simply "Bedwellty No. 2", though the Election Centre adds "Pengam") ward 1973
Party	Candidate	Votes	%	±%
Labour	G. Jenkins	Unopposed		

=== Bedwellty No. 3 Argoed and Cefn Fforest (1 seat) ===
Argoed and Cefn Fforest (Note: South Wales Echo (13 April 1973) gives the ward name as "Bedwellty No. 3" though the Election Centre shows Mrs Lloyd as being elected to "Argoed and Cefn Fforest") ward 1973
Party	Candidate	Votes	%	±%
Labour	(Mrs) O. G. Lloyd	Unopposed		

=== Beechwood (2 seats) ===
Beechwood (Newport) (Note: South Wales Echo (13 April 1973) gives the ward name as "Newport, Beechwood") ward 1973
Party	Candidate	Votes	%	±%
Labour	J. Marsh	1,322		
Liberal	(Mrs) W. Crowther	1,143		
Labour	G. Purnell	1,081		
Conservative	T. Elliot	975		
Conservative	W. Wright	812		
Plaid Cymru	G. Lee	308		
Turnout			62.9	n/a
Registered electors		5,961		

=== Bettws (1 seat) ===
Bettws (Newport) (Note: South Wales Echo (13 April 1973) gives the ward name as "Newport Bettws") ward 1973
Party	Candidate	Votes	%	±%
Labour	J. Morgan	Unopposed		

=== Blackwood (1 seat) ===
Blackwood ward 1973
Party	Candidate	Votes	%	±%
Labour	D. Bosley	Unopposed		

=== Blaenavon (1 seat) ===
Blaenavon ward 1973
Party	Candidate	Votes	%	±%
Labour	D. Puddle	1,568		
Ratepayer	W. Arnold	1,481		
Independent	W. Edwards (Note: South Wales Echo (13 April 1973) describes "W. Edwards" as "Independent" though Elections Centre describes "N. Edwards" as "Democratic Labour")	209		
Turnout			63.4	n/a
Registered electors		5,137		

=== Brynmawr (1 seat) ===
Brynmawr ward 1973
Party	Candidate	Votes	%	±%
Labour	E. Fenton	1,756		
Plaid Cymru	R. Williams	737		
Conservative	V. Jones	535		
Turnout			68.8	n/a
Registered electors		4,399		

=== Caerleon (1 seat) ===
Caerleon ward 1973
Party	Candidate	Votes	%	±%
Labour	J. Kirkwood	1,274		
Plaid Cymru	(Mrs) L. Lewis	952		
Liberal	R. Zeal	498		

=== Caerwent (1 seat) ===
Caerwent ward 1973
Party	Candidate	Votes	%	±%
Labour	S. Baldwin	1,203		
Conservative	L. Horton	1,169		

=== Caldicot (1 seat) ===
Caldicot ward 1973
Party	Candidate	Votes	%	±%
Labour	G. Powell	1,917		
Conservative	M. Shirington	772		

=== Central (1 seat) ===
Central (Newport) (Note: South Wales Echo (13 April 1973) gives the ward name as "Newport Central") ward 1973
Party	Candidate	Votes	%	±%
Labour	A. Hames	1,276		
Conservative	C. Courtney	653		

=== Chepstow (1 seat) ===
Chepstow ward 1973
Party	Candidate	Votes	%	±%
Labour	A. O'Neill	1,240		
Plaid Cymru	E. Spanswick (Note: South Wales Echo (13 April 1973) results page lists Spanswick as the "Plaid Cymru/Common Market Referendum" candidate)	219		

=== Crickhowell and Llanelly Parish (1 seat) ===
Crickhowell and Llanelly Parish (Note: South Wales Echo (13 April 1973) gives the ward name as "Crickhowell") ward 1973
Party	Candidate	Votes	%	±%
Labour	J. Jones	622		
Independent	T. Thomas	491		
Independent	William Morris	375		

=== Crucorny Fawr and Llantilio Pertholey (1 seat) ===
Crucorny Fawr and Llantilio Pertholey (Note: South Wales Echo (13 April 1973) gives the ward name as "Crucorny Fawr and Llantilio" while Elections Centre says "Crucorny Fawr & Llantilio Pertho" (though this will refer to Llantilio Pertholey)) ward 1973
Party	Candidate	Votes	%	±%
Conservative	J. Davies	940		
Labour	E. Blour	567		

=== Crumlin (1 seat) ===
Crumlin ward 1973
Party	Candidate	Votes	%	±%
Labour	A. E. England	Unopposed		

=== Cwmbran Central and Llantarnam (1 seat) ===
Cwmbran Central and Llantarnam ward 1973
Party	Candidate	Votes	%	±%
Labour	Oliver James	1,263		
Independent	D. Miles	831		

=== Cwmtillery (1 seat) ===
Cwmtillery ward 1973
Party	Candidate	Votes	%	±%
Labour	T. Mytton	Unopposed		

=== Ebbw Vale, Badminton, Beaufort and N Central ===
Ebbw Vale, Badminton, Beaufort and North Central (Note: South Wales Echo (13 April 1973) gives the full ward name as "Ebbw Vale, Badminton, Beaufort and North Central" and Election Centre name appears to be abbreviated) ward 1973
Party	Candidate	Votes	%	±%
Labour	F. Watley	1,771		
Ratepayer	W. Jones	1,723		
Ratepayer	A. Pope	1,689		
Labour	K. Barnes	1,665		
Plaid Cymru	J. Evans	1,231		

=== Ebbw Vale Central, Cwm and South Central ===
Ebbw Vale Central, Cwm and South Central (Note: South Wales Echo (13 April 1973) gives the full ward name as "Ebbw Vale Central, Cwm and South Central" and Election Centre name appears to be abbreviated) ward 1973
Party	Candidate	Votes	%	±%
Labour	J. Rogers	3,792		
Labour	R. Morgan	3,667		
Labour	P. Cross	3,070		
Ratepayer	A. O'Donovan	2,965		
Ratepayer	M. Jones	2,357		
Plaid Cymru	D. Kerwick	1,937		

=== Fairwater and Henllys (1 seat) ===
Fairwater and Henllys ward 1973
Party	Candidate	Votes	%	±%
Labour	R. Wellington	1,319		
Communist	D. Clarke	169		

=== Langstone (1 seat) ===
Langstone (Newport) ward 1973
Party	Candidate	Votes	%	±%
Conservative	D. Duthie	1,227		
Labour	J. Murphy	855		

=== Llanfoist and Llanover (1 seat) ===
Llanfoist and Llanover ward 1973
Party	Candidate	Votes	%	±%
Conservative	C. Williams	1,143		
Labour	H. Gail	712		

=== Llanfrechfa Lower (2 seats) ===
Llanfrechfa Lower ward 1973
Party	Candidate	Votes	%	±%
Labour	M. Thomas	2,114		
Labour	R. Hill	1,968		
Conservative	N. Davies	1,346		
Conservative	D. Chappell	1,298		
Independent	F. Hole	601		

=== Llanhilleth (1 seat) ===
Llanhilleth ward 1973
Party	Candidate	Votes	%	±%
Labour	R. Rice	Unopposed		

=== Lliswerry (2 seats) ===
Lliswerry (Note: South Wales Echo (13 April 1973) gives the ward name as "Newport Liswerrry" while the Election Centre calls it "Lliswerry") (Newport) ward 1973
Party	Candidate	Votes	%	±%
Labour	R. Lloyd	1,527		
Labour	H. Herbert	1,422		
Conservative	J. Maynard (Note: Election Centre has repeated the losing Malpas ward Conservative candidates here, but South Wales Echo (13 April 1973) gives the Lliswerry losing candidates as J. Maynard and E. Di Villa)	1,010		
Conservative	E. Di Villa	842		

=== Malpas (1 seat) ===
Malpas (Note: South Wales Echo (13 April 1973) gives the ward name as "Newport Malpas") (Newport) ward 1973
Party	Candidate	Votes	%	±%
Labour	K. James	1,864		
Labour	M. Lewis	1,754		
Conservative	D. Jewett	1,177		
Conservative	M. Bellew	1,128		

=== Monmouth (1 seat) ===
Monmouth ward 1973
Party	Candidate	Votes	%	±%
Conservative	J. Lewis	1,363		
Labour	T. Flynn	757		

=== Mynyddislwyn Penmaen (1 seat) ===
Mynyddislwyn Penmaen ward 1973
Party	Candidate	Votes	%	±%
Labour	S. Lloyd	Unopposed		

=== Nantyglo and Blaina Central and South (1 seat) ===
Nantyglo and Blaina Central and South ward 1973
Party	Candidate	Votes	%	±%
Labour	K. Jayne	1,909		
Independent	W. Chard	1,418		

=== Nantyglo and Blaina North (1 seat) ===
Nantyglo and Blaina North ward 1973
Party	Candidate	Votes	%	±%
Labour	P. Abraham	Unopposed		

=== Newbridge (1 seat) ===
Newbridge ward 1973
Party	Candidate	Votes	%	±%
Labour	T. Matthews	Unopposed		

=== Old Cwmbran (1 seat) ===
Old Cwmbran ward 1973
Party	Candidate	Votes	%	±%
Independent	Derrick Rex	784		
Labour	B. Smith	737		

Councillor Rex was a credit company agent and had been a member of Cwmbran Urban Council for 16 years.

=== Panteg East (1 seat) ===
Panteg East ward 1973
Party	Candidate	Votes	%	±%
Labour	James D. Touhig	1,683		
Independent	C. Irving	932		

This was local newspaper reporter Don Touhig's first ever election, which he won by over 700 votes.

=== Panteg West (1 seat) ===
Panteg West ward 1973
Party	Candidate	Votes	%	±%
Labour	A. Skuse	Unopposed		

=== Pontllanfraith (1 seat) ===
Pontllanfraith ward 1973
Party	Candidate	Votes	%	±%
Labour	B. Chicken	Unopposed		

=== Pontnewydd (1 seat) ===
Pontnewydd ward 1973
Party	Candidate	Votes	%	±%
Ratepayer	P. Pritchard	973		
Labour	P. Maplestone	537		

Councillor Pritchard was General Secretary of the Monmouthshire Federation of Ratepayers.

=== Pontnewydd North (1 seat) ===
Pontnewydd North ward 1973
Party	Candidate	Votes	%	±%
Labour	S. Ball	Unopposed		

=== Pontnewydd South (1 seat) ===
Pontnewydd South ward 1973
Party	Candidate	Votes	%	±%
Labour	E. Gibson	448		
Plaid Cymru	E. Palmer	312		

=== Pontypool (1 seat) ===
Pontypool ward 1973
Party	Candidate	Votes	%	±%
Labour	P. Strickland	671		
Plaid Cymru	P. Palmer	151		

=== Ringland (2 seats) ===
Ringland (Newport) (Note: South Wales Echo (13 April 1973) gives the ward name as "Newport Ringland") ward 1973
Party	Candidate	Votes	%	±%
Labour	I. Card	Unopposed		
Labour	F. Edwards	Unopposed		

=== Risca Central (1 seat) ===
Risca Central ward 1973
Party	Candidate	Votes	%	±%
Labour	E. Griffiths	918		
Independent	D. Rees	160		

=== Risca North (1 seat) ===
Risca North ward 1973
Party	Candidate	Votes	%	±%
Labour	A. West	1,022		
Progressive Independent (Note: South Wales Echo (13 April 1973) describes Bevan as a 'Progressive Independent')	M. Bevan	473		

=== Risca South (1 seat) ===
Risca South ward 1973
Party	Candidate	Votes	%	±%
Labour	E. Bendall	1,579		
Independent	R. Webster	877		

=== Rogerstone (1 seat) ===
Rogerstone ward 1973
Party	Candidate	Votes	%	±%
Labour	D. Scrivens	1,178		
Independent	G. Howell	939		

=== Shaftesbury (2 seats) ===
Shaftesbury (Newport) (Note: South Wales Echo (13 April 1973) gives the ward name as "Newport Shaftesbury") ward 1973
Party	Candidate	Votes	%	±%
Labour	E. Bosley	1,574		
Conservative	D. Davies	839		

=== Shirenewton and Tintern (1 seat) ===
Shirenewton and Tintern ward 1973
Party	Candidate	Votes	%	±%
Conservative	I. Heath	1,192		
Labour	A. Huntley	402		
Ratepayer	D. Millard	286		

=== St Julians (2 seats) ===
St Julians (Newport) (Note: South Wales Echo (13 April 1973) gives the ward name as "Newport, St. Julians") ward 1973
Party	Candidate	Votes	%	±%
Labour	E. Ovens	1,595		
Conservative	W. Morris	1,468		
Conservative	R. Thomas	1,425		
Labour	R. Soni	1,387		

=== St Woolos (2 seats) ===
St Woolos (Newport) (Note: South Wales Echo (13 April 1973) gives the ward name as "Newport, St. Woolos") ward 1973
Party	Candidate	Votes	%	±%
Labour	J. Pembridge	1,884		
Labour	L. Turnbull	1,729		
Liberal	D. Hando	1,364		

=== Tredegar Central and West (1 seat) ===
Tredegar Sirhowy ward 1973
Party	Candidate	Votes	%	±%
Liberal	Angus Donaldson	2,172		
Labour	William Harry	1,856		

Bill Harry had been one of four Monmouthshire county councillors in Tredegar for 13 years, but Gwent County Council would only have three Tredegar county councillors, with Harry being the loser against Angus Donaldson who was a sitting Liberal Monmouthshire councillor for Tredegar.

=== Tredegar Georgetown (1 seat) ===
Tredegar Georgetown ward 1973
Party	Candidate	Votes	%	±%
Labour	W. Price	925		
Liberal	A. Holley	663		
Independent	L. Perriam	143		

=== Tredegar Sirhowy (1 seat) ===
Tredegar Sirhowy ward 1973
Party	Candidate	Votes	%	±%
Liberal	Douglas Thomas	1,425		
Labour	Oliver Williams	1,383		

Councillor Thomas won after a recount.

=== Upper Cwmbran (1 seat) ===
Upper Cwmbran ward 1973
Party	Candidate	Votes	%	±%
Labour	D. Price	745		
Independent	J. Price	273		

=== Usk and Pontypool Rural (1 seat) ===
Usk and Pontypool Rural ward 1973
Party	Candidate	Votes	%	±%
Conservative	V. Etheridge	2,033		
Labour	J. Davies	677		

=== Victoria (1 seat) ===
Victoria (Newport) (Note: South Wales Echo (13 April 1973) gives the ward name as "Newport Victoria") ward 1973
Party	Candidate	Votes	%	±%
Labour	Patrick Geraghty	1,333		
Conservative	Percy Jones	1,075		

Percy Jones, an alderman and former major of Newport County Borough had been a council member in Newport for 20 years.

=== Ynysddu (1 seat) ===
Ynysddu ward 1973
Party	Candidate	Votes	%	±%
Labour	R. Evans	Unopposed		

== See also ==
- 1972 Newport County Borough Council election
