= Jeffrey Cuthbert =

Welsh politician (born 1948)

Jeff Cuthbert
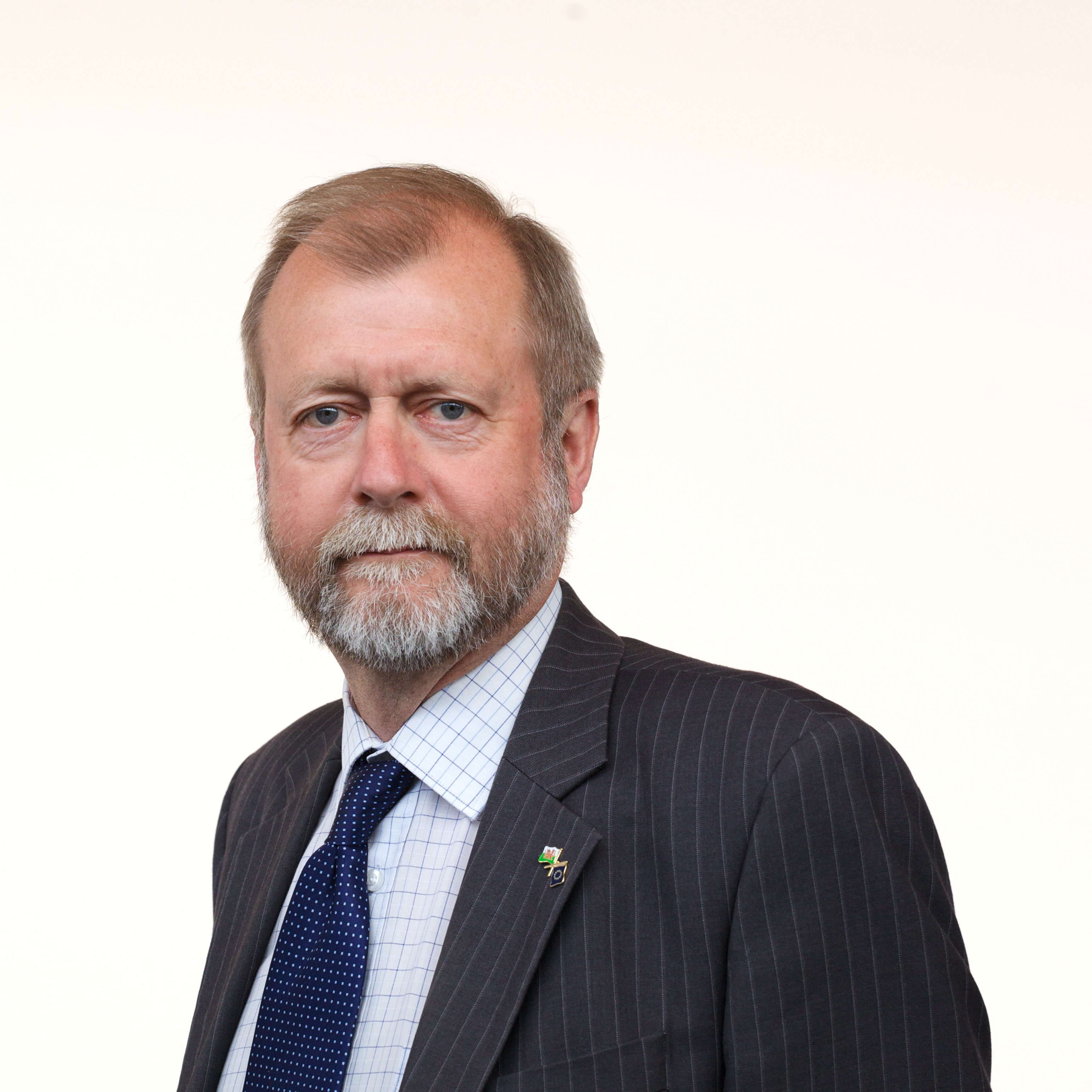

Gwent Police and Crime Commissioner
- In office 12 May 2016 – 8 May 2024
- Preceded by: Ian Johnston
- Succeeded by: Jane Mudd

Minister for Communities and Tackling Poverty
- In office 26 June 2013 – 11 September 2014
- First Minister: Carwyn Jones
- Deputy: Vaughan Gething
- Preceded by: Huw Lewis
- Succeeded by: Lesley Griffiths

Deputy Minister for Skills and Technology
- In office 14 March 2012 – 26 June 2013
- First Minister: Carwyn Jones
- Preceded by: Huw Lewis
- Succeeded by: Lesley Griffiths

Member of the Welsh Assembly for Caerphilly
- In office 1 May 2003 – 6 April 2016
- Preceded by: Ron Davies
- Succeeded by: Hefin David

Personal details
- Born: 4 June 1948 (age 78) Glasgow, Scotland
- Party: Welsh Labour
- Education: University College, Cardiff
- Occupation: Trade unionist

Jeffrey Hambley Cuthbert (born 4 June 1948) is a Welsh politician. He served as Gwent Police and Crime Commissioner from 2016 to 2024. Cuthbert served as a Labour Party member of the National Assembly for Wales for Caerphilly from 2003 to 2016. He began his career in the mining industry and later worked for the Welsh Joint Education Committee (as it was then) as head of the Asset to Industry Unit.

== Biography ==
Cuthbert was born in Glasgow to a Welsh mother and Scottish father, but brought up in Cardiff, where he attended Whitchurch County Secondary Modern followed by studying mining engineering at University College, Cardiff. He joined the Labour Party in the mid-1960s. As a mining engineer he worked at Markham and Oakdale pits.

A member of the Militant group from the mid-60s to early-80s, Cuthbert later became Chair of Caerphilly Constituency Labour Party. He left the mining industry to develop qualifications for Modern Apprenticeships with WJEC, and became a Corporate Member of the Chartered Institute of Personnel and Development. He was a governor of the Lewis School, Pengam, and served as principal of a part-time Adult Education Centre at Aberbargoed.

In the 2003 election to the National Assembly for Wales, Cuthbert was selected at the last minute to replace Ron Davies who stood down following a sex scandal. He increased the Labour majority in the Caerphilly constituency.

Cuthbert was appointed chair of the Objective One Programme Monitoring Committee for Wales in 2004, and subsequently chair of its All-Wales successor body in 2007. He is a chair of the Assembly's Cross-Party Groups on Healthy Living and the Built Environment; and is co-chair of the Cross-Party Group on Beer and the Pub. As an active trade unionist, he is co-ordinator of the UNITE Group of Labour Assembly Members. At the 2007 election he successfully defended his seat after Ron Davies, challenged to regain it as an Independent candidate.

At the 2011 Welsh General Election, Cuthbert successfully defended his seat once again, after another challenge from Davies, who this time stood for Plaid Cymru.

In March 2012 he was appointed Deputy Minister for Skills and Technology and joined the Cabinet in June 2013 as Minister for Communities and Tackling Poverty in the Welsh Government.

In September 2014 he announced his decision to stand down as Caerphilly AM at the 2016 elections. Because of that, he also stood down from the Welsh Government Cabinet.

Between May 2016 and May 2024 Cuthbert was Gwent Police and Crime Commissioner. On 2 May 2024 he was replaced by Labour's Jane Mudd.

== Offices held ==
Senedd
| Preceded by Ron Davies | Assembly Member for Caerphilly; 2003–2016 | Succeeded by Hefin David |
Political offices
| Preceded by Lesley Griffiths | Deputy Minister for Skills; 2011–2013 | Succeeded by Ken Skates |
| New post | Minister for Communities and Tackling Poverty; 2013–2016 | post reorganised |
