= 2025 Caerphilly by-election =

2025 Senedd by-election in Wales

- 23 October 2025

Caerphilly constituency
- Turnout: 50.43% (▲3.8 pp)

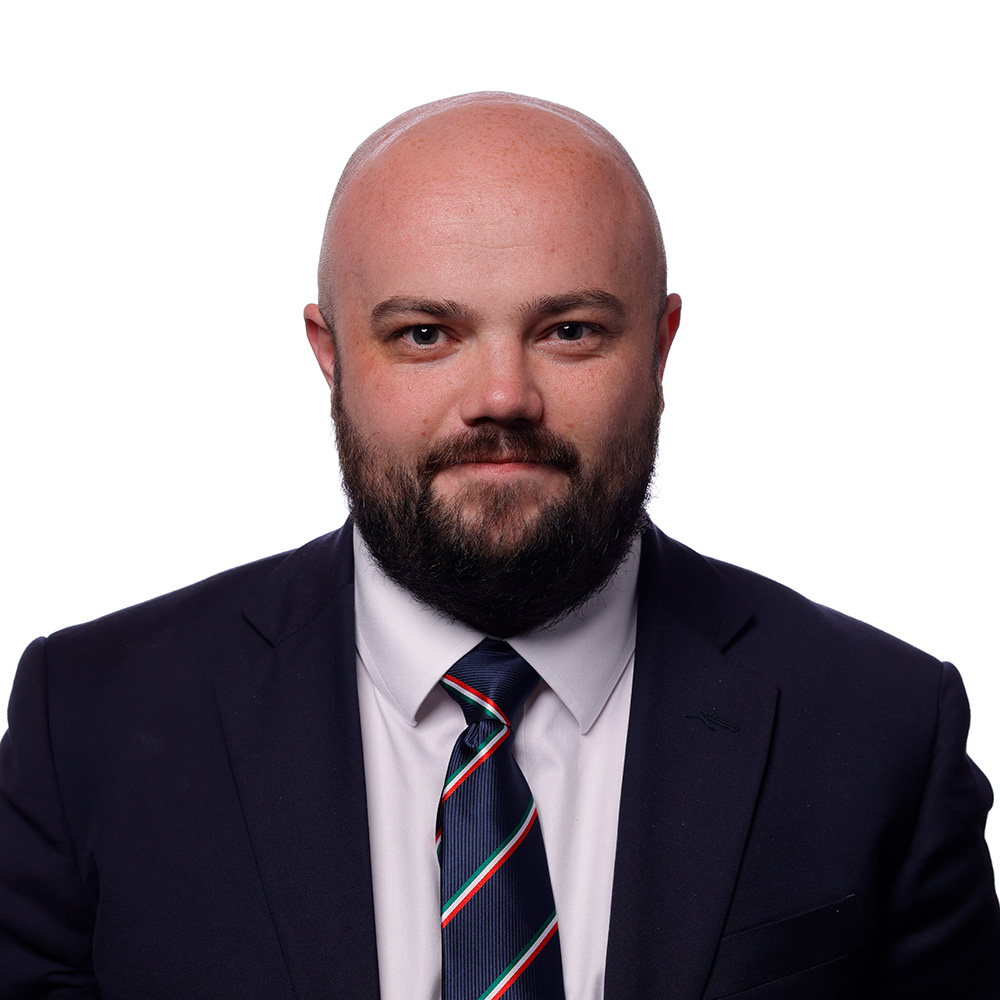
	First party	Second party	Third party
			Labour
Candidate	Lindsay Whittle	Llŷr Powell	Richard Tunnicliffe
Party	Plaid Cymru	Reform	Labour
Popular vote	15,961	12,113	3,713
Percentage	47.4%	36.0%	11.0%
Swing	▲19.0 pp	▲34.2 pp	▼34.9 pp
MS before election
Hefin David
Labour
Elected MS
Lindsay Whittle
Plaid Cymru

Map of the Caerphilly Senedd constituency

The 2025 Caerphilly by-election was held on 23 October 2025 to elect the new member of the Senedd (MS) for the Senedd constituency of Caerphilly following the death of Hefin David on 12 August 2025.

Former Senedd member Lindsay Whittle of Plaid Cymru won the by-election with 47% of the vote, ending more than a hundred years of Labour representation in UK Parliament and Senedd elections in Caerphilly, and outperforming expectations of a closer race between Plaid Cymru and Reform UK. Voter turnout was 50.43%, the highest ever for a Senedd by-election. The election left the incumbent Labour government with a minority of 29 out of 60 seats.

This was the fifth Senedd by-election to be held since its formation as the National Assembly for Wales in 1999 and the first since it changed its name to the Senedd in 2020. It was also expected to be the last Welsh Senedd by-election in its foreseeable future, as pending reforms to the Senedd's electoral system in 2026 were to introduce a closed list system of proportional representation, filling vacant constituency seats using the party list.

== Background ==
=== Constituency ===
The Caerphilly constituency contains the town of Caerphilly and extends up to Bargoed in the north and to Machen in the east. Economically, Caerphilly has a high level of food bank dependence and around 20% of children live in poverty. Youth unemployment is high, low incomes are common, and residents have low levels of health and education. The constituency has traditionally been reliant on the coal industry. Caerphilly has one of the lowest proportions of foreign-born residents in Wales.

=== Representation ===
Hefin David had been the Welsh Labour member of the Senedd (MS) for the Senedd constituency of Caerphilly since the 2016 National Assembly for Wales election. He served as a backbench MS for the duration of his career on the legislature before his sudden death on 12 August 2025. His death left the constituency's seat vacant and therefore triggered a by-election under the Government of Wales Act 2006 and Senedd Cymru (Members and Elections) Act 2024, which would be held to elect his successor as MS for Caerphilly. As by-elections had to be held within three months of vacancies, the by-election had to be held no later than 11 November 2025. On 3 September, the date of election was announced as 23 October 2025. This by-election was expected to be the last to the Senedd before a 2026 change to a closed list system of proportional representation, and therefore the last by-election to the Senedd for the foreseeable future, as constituency vacancies under this system were to be filled using the party list rather than through a by-election.

In order to vote in the by-election, voters needed to be aged 16 or over and have been registered to vote before 7 October 2025. Those who wanted to apply for a postal vote needed to have done so before 8 October 2025. Polling stations were open from 7 am to 10 pm.

== Candidates ==
Plaid Cymru was the first party to announce its candidate, naming former South Wales East AM Lindsay Whittle as their candidate on 3 September. Whittle is the opposition leader on Caerphilly County Borough Council and was brought up in Caerphilly.

Welsh Labour was the next party to begin its selections process. Wayne David, former Labour MP for Caerphilly, was reportedly approached by Welsh Labour to stand, but he ruled himself out as a candidate on 3 September. The day before selection Jamie Pritchard, deputy leader of Caerphilly County Borough Council, was removed from the shortlist of candidates by Welsh Labour, allegedly due to tweets supporting Jeremy Corbyn when he had been Labour party leader. On 6 September, the party announced Richard Tunnicliffe, Hefin David's former campaign manager and son of Labour life peer Lord Tunnicliffe, as its candidate, who was selected at a meeting of local party members. Tunnicliffe runs a children's publishing company.

On 11 September the Welsh Conservatives launched their campaign with their candidate as Gareth Potter. Potter has experience in the retail and charity sectors.

It was initially reported that Reform UK may stand former Reform UK Wales leader Mark Reckless as its candidate, but they instead selected Llŷr Powell, launching their campaign on 12 September. Powell, a communications specialist and Welsh speaker, lives in Caerphilly and said that Hefin David had been an "excellent Senedd member who was never tribal, committed to his community and made a real difference in education."

On 16 September, the party Gwlad, which supports Welsh independence, announced local army veteran Anthony Cook as their candidate.

On 19 September, the Welsh Liberal Democrats announced their candidate as Steve Aicheler, a member of Bedwas, Trethomas and Machen Community Council. His campaign had a focus on social care and child care.

On 23 September, the Wales Green Party announced their candidate as Gareth Hughes, a retired political journalist. He previously worked for ITV Wales, BBC Radio Wales and Radio Cymru.

UKIP fielded Roger Anthony Quilliam as their candidate. He is 22 years old and is on the National Executive Committee of the party, serving until October 2025. He was the only candidate who doesn't reside in Wales.

== Campaign ==
Most political parties suspended their campaigning in Caerphilly in the immediate aftermath of David's death out of respect; however Reform UK continued to campaign in the constituency, including on the day of his funeral when it distributed a leaflet and a letter from party leader Nigel Farage criticising other parties and asking for support, which led to accusations that Reform was being insensitive and disrespectful. Other parties resumed campaigning after the date of the by-election was announced on 3 September.

In early September, Reform set up a campaign office in Caerphilly town centre. In a letter addressed to local residents by UK party leader Nigel Farage, the party accused Welsh Labour of "failing" on the NHS, employment and immigration, and also asked for voters to pledge their support and send donations to the campaign. Farage's deputy Richard Tice said the party would focus on cutting wasteful spending in the Senedd, for example by ending 20 mph speed limits and reforming the structure of NHS Wales, and cutting immigration to Wales, but did not specify the exact reforms it would make to the NHS. According to party sources, Reform hoped to take the Conservative vote and attract part of the Labour vote, on the model of its predecessor, UKIP, in the 2016 National Assembly for Wales election, in order to win the by-election. Polling had suggested a tight battle between Reform UK and Plaid Cymru.

On 11 September, Sean Morgan, the then leader of Caerphilly County Borough Council, resigned from Welsh Labour alleging it had "fixed" the selection process by blocking his deputy leader from standing as a candidate, and backed Plaid Cymru. He now sits as an independent and is no longer leader. The New Statesman reported that Caerphilly Labour councillors did not campaign strongly during the by-election because of the contentious selection process. It also stated that the candidate Tunnicliffe "can be characterised as a Starmerite personified" and he spoke like "reading a Labour Party press release".

On 25 September, prime minister Keir Starmer told BBC Wales that he did not know whether he would campaign in the by-election. The by-election was deemed important for his leadership. One month prior to the by-election, the Labour candidate was accused of hypocrisy over library closures in the constituency.

In late September, Nathan Gill, former Reform UK Wales leader who stopped being active in the party in 2021, pleaded guilty to counts of bribery from a pro-Russian politician in 2018 and 2019. During the by-election campaign, Welsh Labour and the First Minister called on Reform's candidate, Llŷr Powell, to explain what he knew about the affair as he used to work as an adviser to Gill, though Reform argued that this was before Gill had committed any criminal acts. In an interview with ITV Wales, Powell reiterated that he had stopped working for Gill in 2017 before the offences took place, and stated that Gill had hidden his activities from the party. Powell furthermore described Gill's actions as a 'complete and utter betrayal' and 'an abhorrent thing to do' while also saying Labour was engaging in a 'desperate smear campaign' against Reform on social media. On 3 October 2025, Welsh Labour retracted social media adverts implying Powell had links to Vladimir Putin after receiving a legal complaint from Reform.

A TV debate between the candidates was held on 15 October. Six candidates were asked questions by BBC Cymru Wales at an event held at the Bedwas Workmen's Hall and Institute. Issues debated included the local library closures, the NHS and illegal immigration.

== Analysis ==
The by-election was held in the run-up to the 2026 Senedd election. Plaid Cymru have led Caerphilly County Borough Council twice since devolution began in 1999, whilst the Senedd seat has been held by Labour for the duration of the period. The by-election was described as a challenge for Labour by Reform and Plaid Cymru in their heartland. Professor Laura McAllister noted that the result would "signal fundamental realignment" in Welsh politics and that the Welsh Labour hegemony in Wales was soon coming to an end.

The Times predicted the Caerphilly by-election to be a close race between Reform UK's Llŷr Powell and Plaid Cymru's Lindsay Whittle, and forecast a Labour loss. Labour MP Nia Griffith said the election would be "very challenging" for her party, believing Reform to be Labour's main challenger.

The election left the incumbent Welsh Labour government of Eluned Morgan with a minority of 29 of 59 seats in the Senedd, and the election was discussed as likely making it more difficult for Morgan's government to negotiate the next Welsh budget for 2026 to 2027.

== Opinion polling ==
Pollster	Client	Dates conducted	Sample size	Lab	Plaid	Con	Lib Dem	Reform	Green	Others	Lead
By-election result		23 Oct 2025	–	11%	47.4%	2%	1.5%	36%	1.5%	0.5%	11.4
Survation	Camlas	7–14 Oct 2025	501	12%	38%	4%	1%	42%	3%	–	4
2021 Senedd election		6 May 2021	–	46.0%	28.4%	17.3%	2.7%	1.7%	–	3.9%	17.6

== Results ==
The results were announced the day after the by-election, on 24 October 2025.

2025 Caerphilly by-election
Party	Candidate	Votes	%	±%
Plaid Cymru	Lindsay Whittle	15,961	47.4	+19.0
Reform	Llŷr Powell	12,113	36.0	+34.2
Labour	Richard Tunnicliffe	3,713	11.0	−34.9
Conservative	Gareth Potter	690	2.0	−15.3
Green	Gareth Hughes	516	1.5	New
Liberal Democrats	Steven Aicheler	497	1.5	−1.2
Gwlad	Anthony Cook	117	0.3	New
UKIP	Roger Quilliam	79	0.2	New
Majority		3,848	11.4	N/A
Turnout		33,686	50.4	+6.1
Rejected ballots		50	0.1	
Registered electors		66,895		
Plaid Cymru gain from Labour		Swing	+27.0	

== Previous result ==
2021 Senedd election: Caerphilly
Party	Candidate	Votes	%	±%
Labour	Hefin David	13,289	46.0	+10.7
Plaid Cymru	Delyth Jewell	8,211	28.4	–1.1
Conservative	Steven Mayfield	5,013	17.3	+8.4
Abolish	Stephen Jones	1,119	3.9	New
Liberal Democrats	Steven Aicheler	787	2.7	+1.3
Reform	Tim Price	495	1.7	New
Majority		5,078	17.6	+11.8
Turnout		28,914	44.3	+1.0
Labour hold		Swing		

== Aftermath ==
Polling from Survation suggested Reform would win the election, but they ended up 11 points behind Plaid Cymru. Academics claimed that Reform's lack of a focus on Welsh identity may have cost them the election.

Though they were expected to lose, Labour only gaining 11% of the vote was surprisingly low for them. It was the party's worst drop in support for a Welsh by-election, as well as their lowest vote share in Caerphilly since the January 1910 general election. The Conservatives performed even worse with just 2% of the vote, losing their election deposit and marking their worst by-election performance on record.

Keir Starmer said he was "disappointed" with the result, whilst some Labour MPs laid blame for the defeat at him. One told The Independent that there was "absolutely nothing Starmer can do to turn the political tide" and urged him to "consider his position now, not later, before the Labour Party sinks into the abyss". Psephologist John Curtice told BBC Radio 4's Today programme that the result suggested Plaid Cymru were best placed to win the upcoming Senedd election, meaning Labour were in "severe trouble". Politico's Dan Bloom, meanwhile, said that it should be a warning to other centrist politicians across Europe.

In a Guardian op-ed, Plaid Cymru leader Rhun ap Iorwerth wrote: "Many London commentators expected the seat to fall to Reform – perhaps even hoped it would. It would have fit the narrative that post-industrial communities naturally drift to the populist right. We proved them wrong. A message built on fairness, community and national purpose resonated with voters, and a comfortable majority voted for it." In the New Statesman, Scarlett Maguire said the result "demonstrated that a coalesced progressive coalition could defeat Farage."

== See also ==
- List of by-elections to the Senedd
- 2026 Gorton and Denton by-election
