= Llŷr Powell =

Welsh politician (born 1995)

Llŷr Powell MS
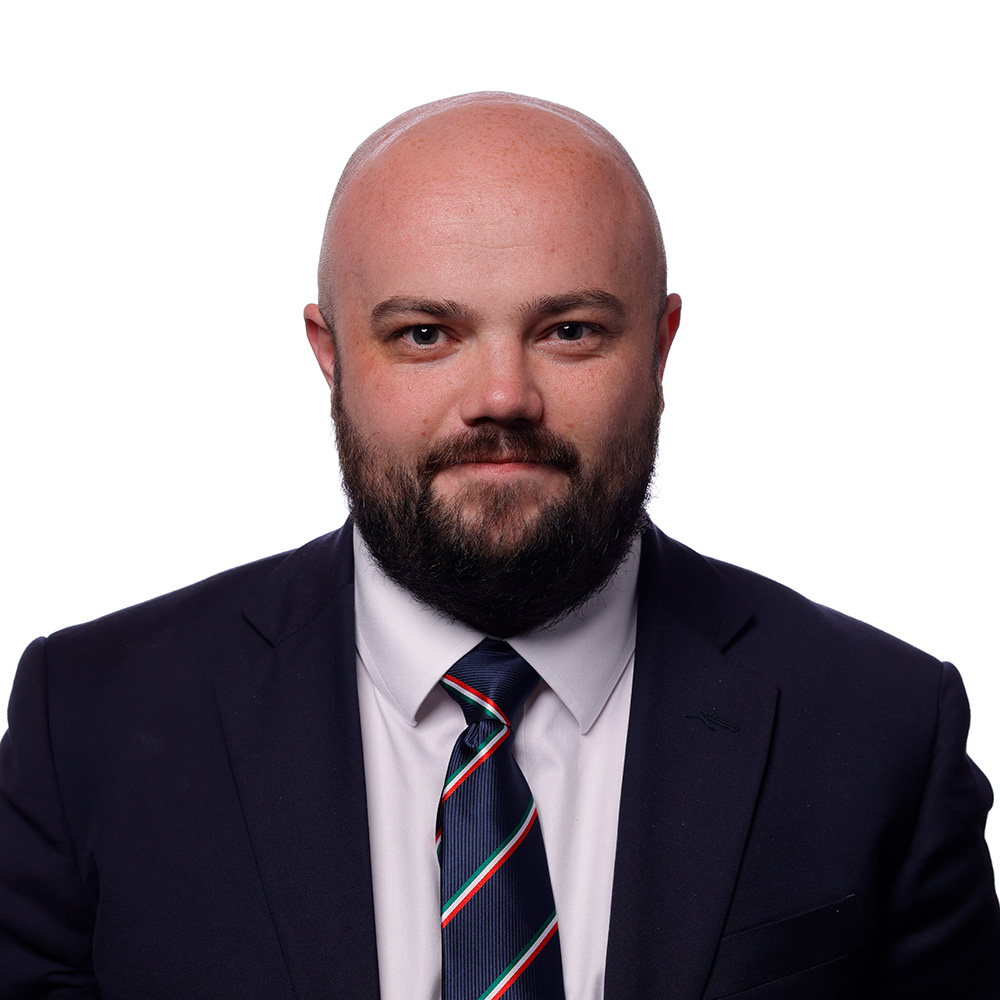
- Office Portrait, 2026

Member of the Senedd for Blaenau Gwent Caerffili Rhymni
- Incumbent
- Assumed office 8 May 2026
- Preceded by: Constituency established

Personal details
- Born: Llŷr Tomos Powell; April 1995 (age 31)
- Party: Reform UK (since 2024)
- Other political affiliations: UKIP (2014–2016); Conservative (2016–2019, 2022); Brexit Party (2019–2021)

Llŷr Tomos Powell (born April 1995) is a Welsh politician for who has served as a Member of the Senedd (MS) for Blaenau Gwent Caerffili Rhymni since 2026. A member of Reform UK Wales, he has previously been a member of UKIP Wales and the Welsh Conservatives, running for election with both parties at various points, as well as working as political staff for several parties, as well as in public affairs and communications. He unsuccessfully contested the 2025 Caerphilly by-election for Reform UK, coming second to Plaid Cymru's Lindsay Whittle.

== Personal life and education ==
Powell has dyslexia. He left school at age 16, working in a leisure centre until he began his political career.

== Political career ==
Powell has stated he became interested in politics after he was unable to participate in a planned group trip to Magaluf with friends, due to receiving a higher than expected tax bill, which he attributed to an EU working directive. He said this then brought him to look into politics, and that he found videos of Nigel Farage on YouTube, talking about among other things, the taxation he had experienced. He travelled to see him speak in Swansea during the 2014 European Parliament election, and became involved in UKIP politics shortly thereafter.

=== Early political career (2015-2024) ===
Powell began working for UKIP in 2015, in their policy development group in Westminster. Powell was set to stand for UKIP as a candidate for the Neath Assembly constituency and the South Wales West region at the 2016 Welsh Assembly election, but resigned as a candidate after Gareth Bennett, a fellow UKIP candidate, blamed 'a melting pot of different races all getting on each other's nerves' for a lack of cleanliness on a road in Cardiff. Bennett went on to particularly blame Eastern European immigrants for the rubbish issue. Powell stated that he "did not want [Bennett] there at all with the views he [had] expressed". Powell's replacement as candidate for South Wales West, Caroline Jones, was successfully elected.

Powell then worked for former Reform UK leader Nathan Gill as an advisor in the European Parliament, while Gill was a member of UKIP, and its leader in Wales (though not in the Welsh Assembly), from 2016 to 2017. While an advisor to Gill, Assembly UKIP leader Neil Hamilton demanded his resignation, after he tweeted in opposition to changes that would have allowed AMs based in England to claim accommodation expenses in Cardiff. Hamilton was the only AM based in England at the time, and was ineligible for reimbursement claims. Gill described the demand as 'bullying behaviour' and described Powell as a 'talented young man who I know well'.

After Nathan Gill resigned from the Senedd in 2017, Powell moved to work for Mandy Jones, Gill's replacement as AM for North Wales. UKIP Senedd Leader Neil Hamilton immediately refused Jones entry to the UKIP group, as she had hired staff he believed to be disloyal to the party when she rehired several members of Gills staff, including Powell. Powell also at this time stated that at some point prior to his stint as a UKIP member, he had been a member of the Conservatives, and when asked if he was at that time a conservative member, he responded with "I plead the fifth amendment." He would later say he had left UKIP in 2016.

In 2017, Powell co-founded a pro-Brexit think tank with Vote Leave's regional director for Wales Matthew MacKinnon, called the Centre for Welsh Studies. Powell left the organisation in July 2019.

In an interview in 2025, Powell stated he joined the Conservatives in 2016, to vote in their leadership election, but was not "an active member", saying he felt "politically homeless" there. He then joined the Brexit Party in 2019, working there are a spokesperson. He left the Brexit Party in 2021, moving to work for various charities in a consulting capacity, including Scouts Cymru. He returned to the Conservative Party at some point in 2021, running as a Welsh Conservative candidate for the Grangetown ward at the 2022 Cardiff Council election. He received 442 votes and was not elected. He supported Kemi Badenoch for leader of the conservatives at both the July–September 2022 and October 2022 Conservative party leadership elections. In the July-September election he declared a preference for Liz Truss over other candidates, after Badenoch was eliminated.

In June 2023, he was confirmed to be under investigation by Scouts Cymru after reporting by Nation Cymru on anti-trans comments made on his social media. He left Scouts Cymru shortly after.

=== Reform UK ===
Powell changed parties again to Reform UK in 2024, after becoming frustrated with the Rishi Sunak government. It was at this time he began working for Reform UK. Most recently he has been a Press Officer for them. It is alleged that Reform UK officials, including Nigel Farage, call him 'Welsh Dave', as they struggle to pronounce Llŷr. On 12 September 2025, Powell was announced as Reform's candidate for the 2025 Caerphilly by-election, following the death of former MS Hefin David. Powell and David had a pre-existing relationship, which Powell described as a social media 'banter'.

During the campaign for the Caerphilly by-election, Nathan Gill, Powell's former employer, pleaded guilty to 8 counts of bribery in relation to pro-Russia statements he made in the European Parliament. Powell responded by describing Gill's conduct as a 'complete and utter betrayal'. The charges relate to crimes after Powell left Gill's office, and Powell denied any knowledge of the scheme. The issue regardless became a significant one throughout the by-election campaign.

Powell lost the Caerphilly by-election, coming in second to Plaid Cymru’s Lindsay Whittle. Powell refused his right to make a speech at the count after the results were announced.

In March 2026, Powell was announced to be lead candidate for Reform on the Blaenau Gwent Caerffili Rhymni constituency for the 2026 Senedd election. On 8 May, he was elected to the Senedd.

On 19 May 2026 he was announced as Reform's chief whip and business manager.
