= Debbie Wilcox, Baroness Wilcox of Newport =

British politician (born 1969)

The Right Honourable The Baroness Wilcox of Newport FRSA
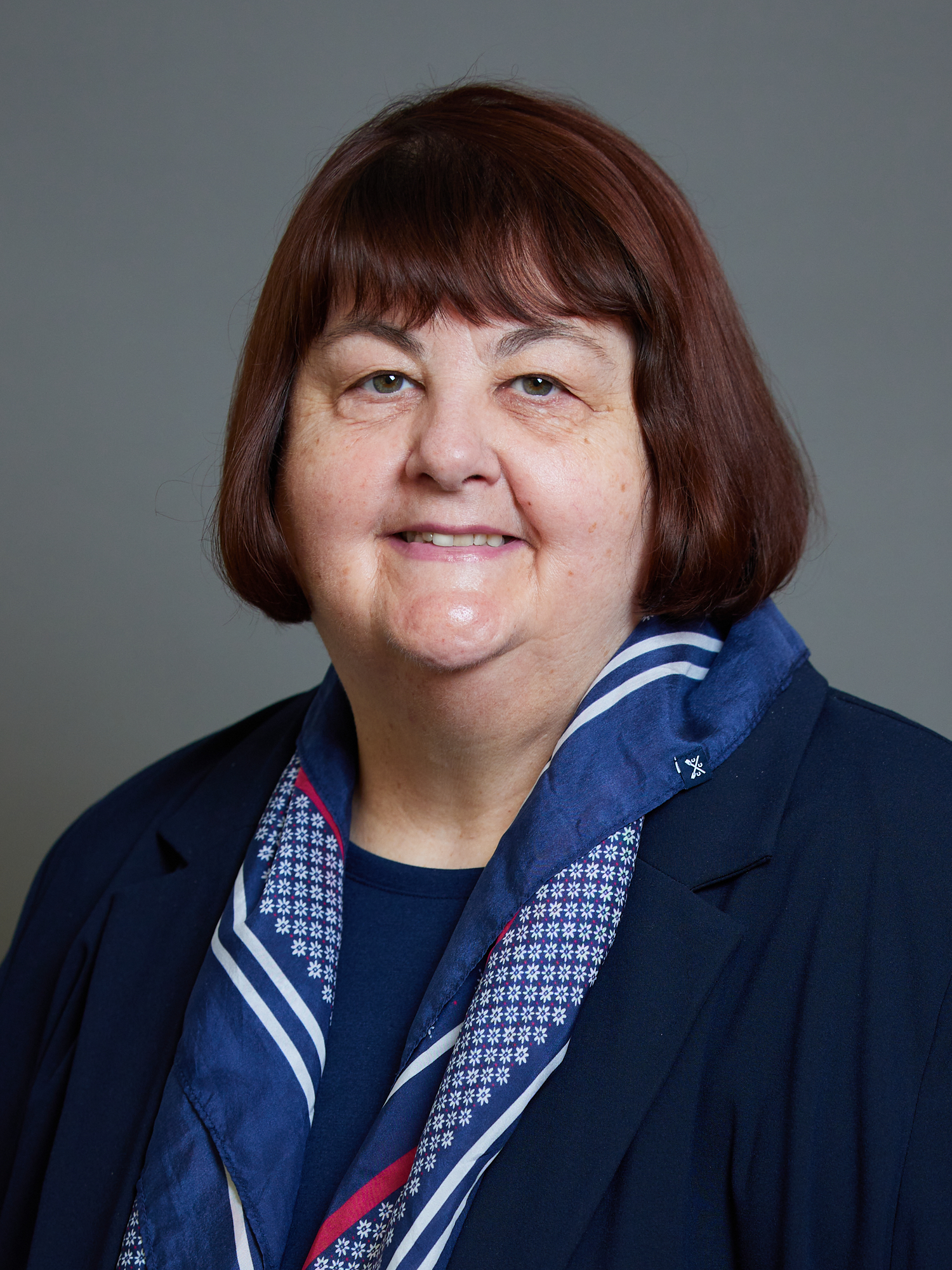
- Official portrait, 2022

Member of the House of Lords
- Lord Temporal
- Life peerage 14 October 2019
Shadow portfolios
2021–present	Education
2021–present	Wales
2020–present	Whip
2021–2023	Work and Pensions
2020–2021	Women and Equalities

Leader of the Welsh Local Government Association
- In office 23 June 2017 – 6 December 2019
- Preceded by: Bob Wellington
- Succeeded by: Andrew Morgan

Leader of Newport City Council
- In office 17 May 2016 – 12 September 2019
- Preceded by: Bob Bright
- Succeeded by: Jane Mudd

Member of Newport City Council for Gaer
- In office 1 May 2004 – 5 May 2022

Personal details
- Born: 15 June 1957 (age 69) Rhondda, Glamorgan, Wales
- Party: Labour
- Education: Central School of Speech and Drama (BEd); University of Wales, Cardiff (MA)

Deborah Ann Wilcox, Baroness Wilcox of Newport (born 15 June 1957) is a British politician serving as a Member of the House of Lords since 2019. A member of the Labour Party, she served as Leader of the Welsh Local Government Association from 2017 to 2019. Wilcox was Leader of Newport City Council from 2016 to 2019 and served on the Council from 2004 to 2022.

== Early life ==
Deborah Ann Wilcox was born on 15 June 1957 in the Rhondda Valley, and brought up in Pontygwaith. She studied for a BEd in Drama and Education at the Central School of Speech and Drama between 1975 and 1979, followed by a MA in Media Studies at University of Wales, Cardiff between 1994 and 1997.

== Teaching career ==
She began her career as a teacher, initially at Hawthorn High School as well as spells teaching in the Newport area for 30 years including at Hartridge High School, Duffryn High School, and Maindee Primary School.

== Political career ==
In 2004 she was appointed Cabinet Member for Education and Young People, a role she held until 2016, as well as a former Cabinet Member for Leisure and Culture.

In 2016 she was appointed as the first female Leader of Newport City Council, replacing the outgoing Bob Bright.

In 2017 she became the first female Leader of the Welsh Local Government Association, succeeding Cllr Bob Wellington OBE, the former leader of Torfaen County Borough Council.

As part of her new role, Wilcox spoke to BBC Wales to criticise the "abuse of councillors on social media" prompted by reactions to cuts to public services. She stated that, while councillors should be open to fair criticism and scrutiny, the situation was "becoming unsafe". It came after Bridgend County Borough Councillor Sadie Vidal was told she "would be torn apart by fox hounds" and Flintshire County Council Deputy Leader Bernie Attridge was threatened along with his children after the closure of John Summers High School in the area in 2015. The WLGA stated it is looking at ways to "protect councillors from online and face-to-face abuse, including potential legislation."

Wilcox announced her candidacy in the 2018 Welsh Labour Party deputy leadership election, but withdrew in favor of Julie Morgan.

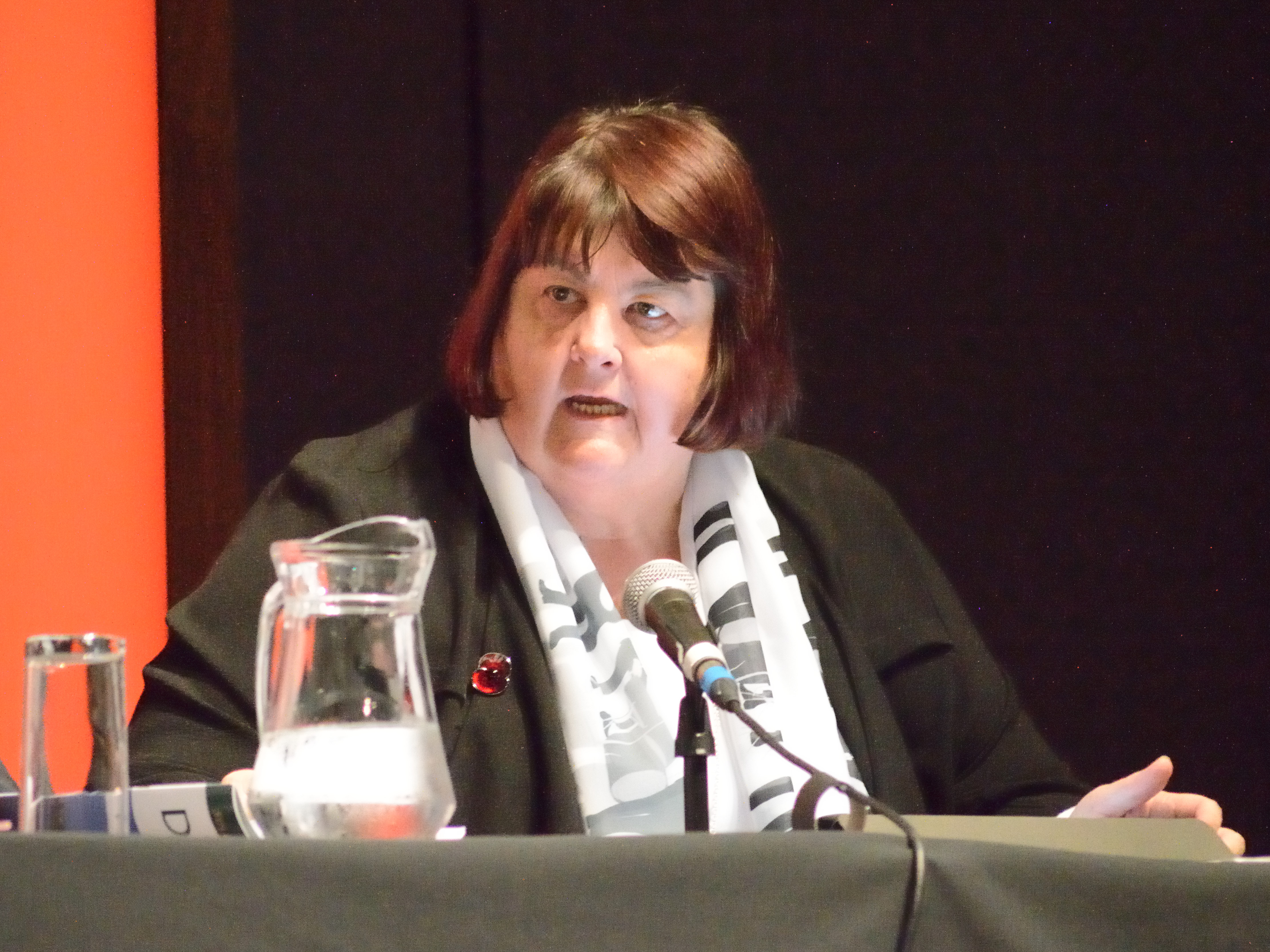
Wilcox speaking in 2018

In 2018, she became a fellow of the Royal Society of Arts.

In 2019 she was criticised by Conservative councillors for spending £11,397 on "chauffeur driven cars" out of a total Council budget of £81,415 on such vehicles.

Having been announced as a life peer, in September 2019, Wilcox informed a meeting of the full council that she would be stepping down as Council Leader, at least in the short term, in order to focus on her role in the Lords.

=== House of Lords ===
In September 2019, it was announced that she would be made a Labour life peer in the 2019 Prime Minister's Resignation Honours, and would be stepping down as Council Leader.

She is referred to widely as Baroness Wilcox, but takes the exact name, style and title of Baroness Wilcox of Newport. On 4 November 2019, she was introduced to the House. Since 2 March 2020, she has served as an opposition whip.

== Personal life ==
Wilcox is openly gay, and was shortlisted by Pride Cymru/Wales Online's Pinc List which "recognises the most influential LGBT+ people in Wales". She was an advocate for the repeal of Section 28, a statute forbidding the promotion of homosexuality by local government and maintained schools. The statute was repealed in September 2003 by the Local Government Act 2003.
