= 1972 Newport County Borough Council election =

1972 local election in Wales

The 1972 Newport County Borough Council election was held on Thursday 4 May 1972 to elect councillors to the Newport County Borough Council in Newport, Monmouthshire. It took place on the same day as other district and county borough council elections in England and Wales.

These were the final elections to the county borough council, which would be replaced on 1 April 1974. The previous all-council election took place in May 1971.

The 1972 election saw the Labour Party make major gains.

== Background ==
Newport County Borough was created in 1891 and abolished for 22 years from 1974, following local government reorganisation enacted by the Local Government Act 1972.

Each of the county borough's electoral divisions was represented by three councillors, who stood down in turn for re-election, hence would each sit for a three year term. The council also consisted of 13 aldermen, who were elected by the councillors.

== Overview of the result ==
At this election Labour won nine of the 14 available seats from the Conservative Party and won a further seat held by a Ratepayer councillor. They increased their majority on the Council to 26.

The composition of the Council following the election was 39 Labour members, 12 Conservatives and one Ratepayer.

== Ward results ==
Contests for one of the seats took place in 12 wards, though in Allt-yr-yn two seats were contested.

=== Alexandra ===
Alexandra ward 1972
| Party | Candidate | Votes | % | ±% |
|---|---|---|---|---|
| Labour | Lilian Mabel Bowen * | 1,243 | | |
| Ratepayer | Edward John James Clarke | 351 | | |
| Turnout | | | | |
| Labour hold | | Swing | | |

=== Allt-yr-yn (2 seats) ===
Allt-yr-yn ward 1972
| Party | Candidate | Votes | % | ±% |
|---|---|---|---|---|
| Conservative | Robert Frank Allen * | 1,947 | | |
| Conservative | Trevor Charles Warren | 1,905 | | |
| Liberal | Elizabeth Ann Harrop-Griffiths | 834 | | |
| Labour | Paul Phillip Flynn | 694 | | |
| Turnout | | | | |
| Conservative hold | | Swing | | |
| Conservative hold | | Swing | | |

=== Alway ===
Alway ward 1972
| Party | Candidate | Votes | % | ±% |
|---|---|---|---|---|
| Labour | Michael John Lewis | 1,933 | | |
| Conservative | Clive Wallace Venn * | 1,175 | | |
| Turnout | | | | |
| Labour gain from Conservative | | Swing | | |

=== Beechwood ===
Beechwood ward 1972
| Party | Candidate | Votes | % | ±% |
|---|---|---|---|---|
| Labour | Martin Hugh Prior | 1,270 | | |
| Conservative | William Ronald Morris * | 957 | | |
| Liberal | Winifred Anita Crowther | 728 | | |
| Turnout | | | | |
| Labour gain from Conservative | | Swing | | |

=== Bettws ===
Bettws ward 1972
| Party | Candidate | Votes | % | ±% |
|---|---|---|---|---|
| Labour | Janice Averil Morgan * | 1,942 | | |
| Conservative | Susan Carolyn Atkin | 440 | | |
| Turnout | | | | |
| Labour hold | | Swing | | |

=== Central ===
Central ward 1972
| Party | Candidate | Votes | % | ±% |
|---|---|---|---|---|
| Labour | Alan Islwyn Giles | 1,065 | | |
| Ratepayer | Reginald James Dray * | 766 | | |
| Turnout | | | | |
| Labour gain from Ratepayer | | | | |

=== Liswerry ===
Liswerry ward 1972
| Party | Candidate | Votes | % | ±% |
|---|---|---|---|---|
| Labour | Desmond Michael Coleman | 1,719 | | |
| Conservative | John Maynard * | 976 | | |
| Turnout | | | | |
| Labour gain from Conservative | | Swing | | |

=== Malpas ===
Malpas ward 1972
| Party | Candidate | Votes | % | ±% |
|---|---|---|---|---|
| Labour | Veronica Joyce Brydon | 1,647 | | |
| Conservative | Reginald Sydney Owen Thomas * | 1,102 | | |
| Turnout | | | | |
| Labour gain from Conservative | | Swing | | |

=== Ringland ===
Ringland ward 1972
| Party | Candidate | Votes | % | ±% |
|---|---|---|---|---|
| Labour | Jean Audrey Card | 2,230 | | |
| Conservative | Trevor Clement Tranter * | 807 | | |
| Turnout | | | | |
| Labour gain from Conservative | | Swing | | |

=== Shaftesbury ===
Shaftesbury ward 1972
| Party | Candidate | Votes | % | ±% |
|---|---|---|---|---|
| Labour | Richard Edward Murray | 1,679 | | |
| Conservative | Eugene Alwyn John Manso-Reesare Di-Villa * | 919 | | |
| Turnout | | | | |
| Labour gain from Conservative | | Swing | | |

=== St Julians ===
St Julians ward 1972
| Party | Candidate | Votes | % | ±% |
|---|---|---|---|---|
| Labour | Robert Charles Bright | 1,493 | | |
| Conservative | Alfred James Copus * | 1,265 | | |
| Liberal | Sarah Harriet Elizabeth Havard | 303 | | |
| Turnout | | | | |
| Labour gain from Conservative | | Swing | | |

=== St Woolos ===
St Woolos ward 1972
| Party | Candidate | Votes | % | ±% |
|---|---|---|---|---|
| Labour | Lloyd Ramsay Turnbull | 2,350 | | |
| Conservative | William Wright | 1,040 | | |
| Turnout | | | | |
| Labour gain from Conservative | | Swing | | |

=== Victoria ===
Victoria ward 1972
| Party | Candidate | Votes | % | ±% |
|---|---|---|---|---|
| Labour | Harry George Williams | 1,423 | | |
| Conservative | Roger Lockyer * | 926 | | |
| Turnout | | | | |
| Labour gain from Conservative | | Swing | | |

* = 'retiring' ward councillor for re-election

== See also ==
- 1973 Gwent County Council election
