= Lindsay Whittle =

Welsh politician (born 1953)

Lindsay Whittle MS
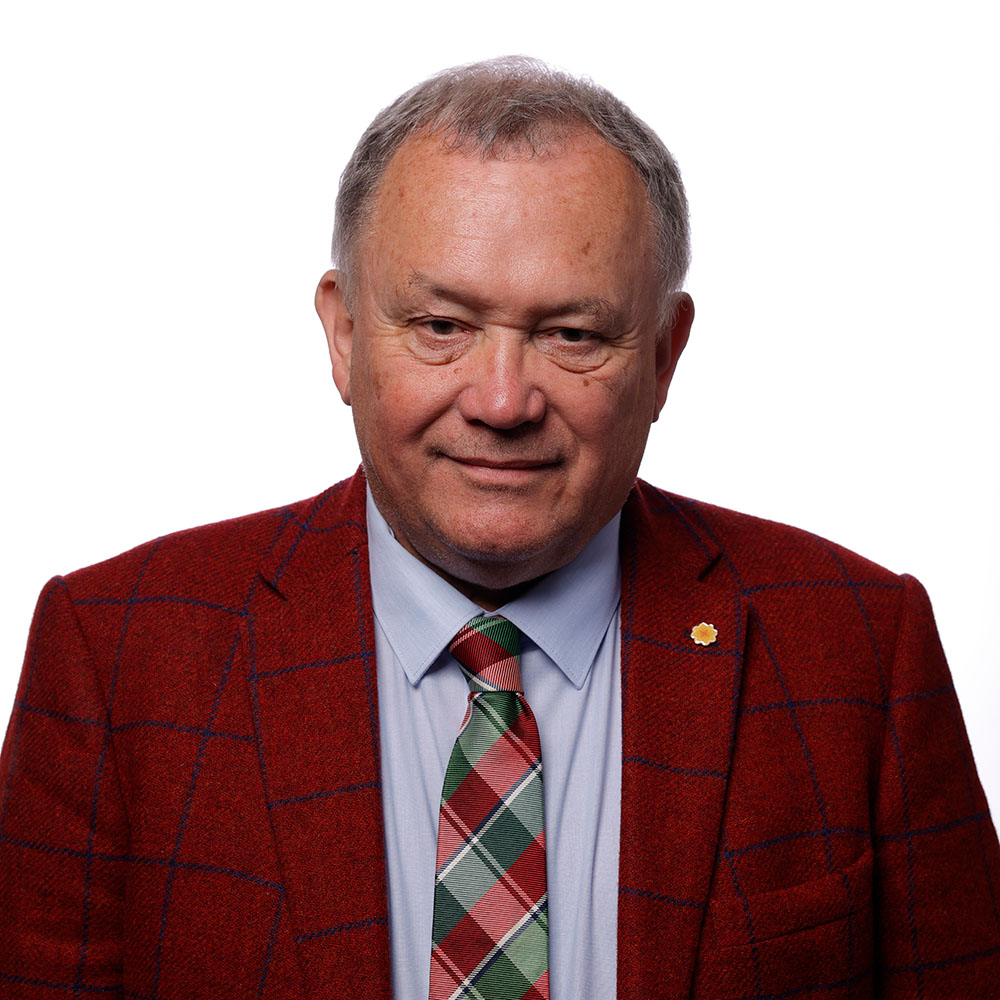
- Official portrait, 2026

Member of the Senedd (Note: Stylized as "Member of the Welsh Assembly" from 2011 to 2016)
- Incumbent
- Assumed office 23 October 2025
- Preceded by: Hefin David
- Constituency: Caerphilly (2025-2026); Blaenau Gwent Caerffili Rhymni (since 2026)
- In office 6 May 2011 – 5 April 2016
- Constituency: South Wales East

Leader of Caerphilly County Borough Council
- In office 15 June 2008 – 11 May 2011
- Preceded by: Harry Andrews
- Succeeded by: Allan Pritchard
- In office 20 May 1999 – 10 June 2004
- Preceded by: Graham Court
- Succeeded by: Harry Andrews

Caerphilly County Borough Councillor for Penyrheol
- In office 5 May 1995 – 23 October 2025
- Preceded by: Council established
- Succeeded by: Aneurin Minton

Personal details
- Born: Lindsay Geoffrey Whittle; March 1953 (age 73) Caerphilly, Wales
- Party: Plaid Cymru
- Profession: Politician

Lindsay Geoffrey Whittle (born March 1953) is a Welsh politician who has been a Member of the Senedd (MS) for Blaenau Gwent Caerffili Rhymni since 2026. A member of Plaid Cymru, he previously served as the MS for the South Wales East region from 2011 to 2016 and then again for Caerphilly, from 2025 to 2026.

He represented the Penyrheol area as a councillor continuously from 1976 to 2025, and has also served as Leader of Caerphilly County Borough Council twice, from 1999 to 2004, and again from 2008 to 2011.

== Personal life ==
Whittle was born in Caerphilly in South Wales, and lives in Abertridwr, Caerphilly.

== Political career ==
=== Local government ===
Whittle was first elected in the 1976 local elections, representing the Penyrheol and Trecenydd ward on Rhymney Valley district council. He was re-elected repeatedly until the council was abolished in 1996. He was further elected to Mid Glamorgan County Council at the 1977 local elections, representing a division at the time simply named 'Caerphilly No. 4' but lost the seat in 1981. He continued to contest this ward, later renamed also to Penyrheol, at elections in 1989 and 1993, but was not re-elected.

After the abolition of Rhymney Valley council, Whittle contested the Penyrheol ward on the new Caerphilly County Borough Council. He represented the ward since the establishment of the council in 1995, being elected to represent the ward 7 times, before resigning his seat following his victory in the 2025 Caerphilly by-election. He continued to represent the ward during his 2011 to 2016 term as a member of the National Assembly for Wales.

Whittle has served as the council's leader for two distinct periods, 1999 to 2004 and 2008 to 2011. He had further served as Plaid Cymru's group leader on the council from 2022 until 2025.

Whittle was also the Welsh Local Government Association's spokesperson on Equalities, Community Safety and Social Justice.

=== National politics ===
Whittle has stood in every Senedd (formerly Welsh Assembly) election since its formation in 1999, and was first successfully elected as a Member of the Welsh Assembly (AM; now Member of the Senedd (MS)) in the 2011 election as a member on the South Wales East list. He was appointed as Plaid Cymru's spokesperson for Social Services, Children & Equal Opportunities shortly after. He retained this role when Leanne Wood took over after the 2012 Plaid Cymru leadership election. His role was slightly modified after Wood reshuffled Plaid's frontbench in May 2013, and he became spokesperson for Social Services, Equality & Older People. He functionally remained in the Equalities and Social Services brief for his entire term. He lost his seat at the 2016 Senedd election, as Plaid Cymru were reduced from 2 to 1 seats in the region.

Whittle has stood ten times for the Westminster Parliament seat of Caerphilly—first standing in the 1983 general election and standing again in every general election since, except in 2015. His best result (by both placing and vote share) was in the 2024 general election, in which Whittle came second with 21.2% of the vote on a turnout of 52.7%. In each election he lost to the Labour Party, who have won the seat continuously since the seat's formation in 1918.

Following the death of incumbent MS Hefin David, Whittle was announced as Plaid Cymru's candidate for the 2025 Caerphilly by-election. Whittle won the election with 47% of the vote. This was the first time Labour had failed to win the seat since the establishment of the Senedd in 1999. He won Caerphilly after contesting the constituency 13 times since 1983. Upon being elected, he stood down as a councillor for Penyrheol, as he could not hold both roles simultaneously.

In the 2026 Senedd election, he was a candidate in the Blaenau Gwent Caerffili Rhymni constituency, placed second on the Plaid Cymru list and was elected alongside Delyth Jewell and Niamh Salkeld.

== Electoral performance ==
Whittle has contested a total of 19 elections for either the Senedd (formerly known as the Welsh Assembly) and Westminster under the Plaid Cymru banner:

Date of election	Seat	Party	Votes	% of votes	Result
2026 Senedd election	Blaenau Gwent Caerffili Rhymni (2nd on list)	Plaid Cymru	29,314	42.0	Elected
2025 Senedd Caerphilly by-election	Caerphilly	Plaid Cymru	15,961	47.4	Elected
2024 UK general election	Caerphilly	Plaid Cymru	8,119	21.2	Not elected
2021 Senedd election	South Wales East (3rd on list)	Plaid Cymru	30,530	14.7	Not elected
2019 UK general election	Caerphilly	Plaid Cymru	6,424	16.0	Not elected
2017 UK general election	Caerphilly	Plaid Cymru	5,962	14.4	Not elected
2016 Welsh Assembly election	Caerphilly	Plaid Cymru	8,009	29.5	Not elected
2011 Welsh Assembly election	South Wales East (2nd on list)	Plaid Cymru	21,851	12.1	Elected
2010 UK general election	Caerphilly	Plaid Cymru	6,460	16.7	Not elected
2007 Welsh Assembly election	Caerphilly	Plaid Cymru	6,739	25.8	Not elected
2005 UK general election	Caerphilly	Plaid Cymru	6,831	17.4	Not elected
2003 Welsh Assembly election	South Wales East (2nd on list)	Plaid Cymru	21,384	12.6	Not elected
2003 Welsh Assembly election	Caerphilly	Plaid Cymru	6,919	27.4	Not elected
2001 UK general election	Caerphilly	Plaid Cymru	8,172	21.0	Not elected
1999 Welsh Assembly election	South Wales East (4th on list)	Plaid Cymru	49,139	30.37	Not elected
1997 UK general election	Caerphilly	Plaid Cymru	4,383	9.7	Not elected
1992 UK general election	Caerphilly	Plaid Cymru	4,821	9.7	Not elected
1987 UK general election	Caerphilly	Plaid Cymru	3,955	8.05	Not elected
1983 UK general election	Caerphilly	Plaid Cymru	6,414	13.56	Not elected

== Notes ==
Senedd
Preceded by Hefin David	Member of the Senedd for Caerphilly; 2025–2026	Succeeded by Seat abolished
