= District of Monmouth =

Former district of Gwent, Wales

Coordinates: 51°40′N 3°00′W

Monmouth Welsh: Trefynwy
- Monmouth shown within Wales
- Population
  - 1971: 64,400
  - 1991: 76,000
- History
  - Created: 1 April 1974
  - Abolished: 31 March 1996
  - Succeeded by: Monmouthshire
- Status: Borough
  - HQ: Pontypool

Monmouth District (Welsh: Trefynwy) was one of five local government districts in the county of Gwent in Wales between 1974 and 1996. In 1988 the district was granted a charter conferring borough status, becoming the Borough of Monmouth (not to be confused with the pre-1974 municipal borough of Monmouth, which just covered the town itself).

== History ==
The district was created on 1 April 1974 under the Local Government Act 1972. It covered the whole area of seven former districts and most of an eighth, which were all abolished at the same time. All the constituent parts of the new district had been in the administrative county of Monmouthshire prior to the reforms. Gwent County Council provided county-level services for the new Monmouth District.

- Abergavenny Municipal Borough
- Abergavenny Rural District
- Chepstow Rural District
- Chepstow Urban District
- Monmouth Municipal Borough
- Monmouth Rural District
- Pontypool Rural District (except the parish of Llanfrechfa Lower, which went to Torfaen)
- Usk Urban District

The borough was abolished in 1996 by the Local Government (Wales) Act 1994, with the area forming nearly all of the new principal area of Monmouthshire (along with Llanelly from Blaenau Gwent).

== Political control ==
The first election to the council was held in 1973, initially operating as a shadow authority before coming into its powers on 1 April 1974. Political control of the council from 1974 until its abolition in 1996 was as follows:

Party in control	Years
Conservative	1974–1991
No overall control	1991–1996

== Premises ==
The headquarters of the district council was at Mamhilad House, Pontypool, part of the British Nylon Spinners factory site. This was outside the district, lying in neighbouring Torfaen.
