= South Wales Joint Scientific Investigation Unit =

South Wales Joint Scientific Investigation Unit Uned Ymchwilio Gwyddonol ar y Cyd

Agency overview
- Formed: 2012

Jurisdictional structure
- Operations jurisdiction: Bridgend, Cardiff, Merthyr Tydfil, Neath Port Talbot, Rhondda Cynon Taf, Swansea and Vale of Glamorgan unitary authority areas, UK
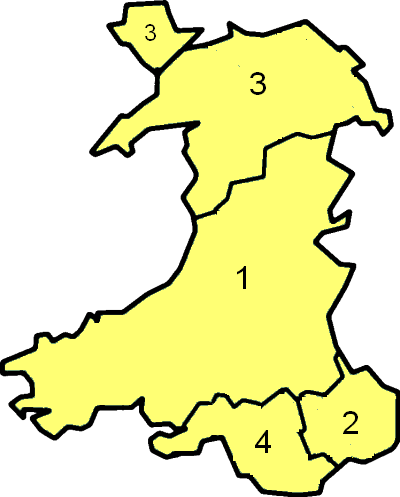
- Joint South Wales / Gwent Police area marked as 4 and 2
- Area: 2,074 km²

Operational structure
- Headquarters: Bridgend

Website
- www.south-wales.police.uk

The South Wales Joint Scientific Investigation Unit (Welsh: Uned Ymchwilio Gwyddonol ar y Cyd De Cymru) is a specialist forensic police unit established in April 2012. It specialises in analysis of drugs, glass, fingerprints, digital crime scenes, ballistics, trace evidence, and forensic samples.

The SWJSIU is based in Bridgend. It is funded by and serves South Wales Police and Gwent Police, independent from the Forensic Science Service of England and Wales.

The unit is the only one of its kind in the UK able to undertake glass investigation, which will involve examining fragments of smashed glass for forensic evidence, and exports copies to the UK National DNA Database. It is also one of only three to have a "metal vacuum deposition room", to obtain fingerprints from smooth surfaces such as carrier bags and glass.

The SWJSIU was launched after the closure of the nearby government-owned Forensic Science Service (FSS) regional laboratory in Chepstow.

The department is a Centre of Excellence and is obtaining ISO accreditation.

== See also ==
- South Wales Police
- DNA
- Forensic science
- Law enforcement in Wales
