= Catherine Cullen (British politician) =

British politician

Catherine Cullen MS
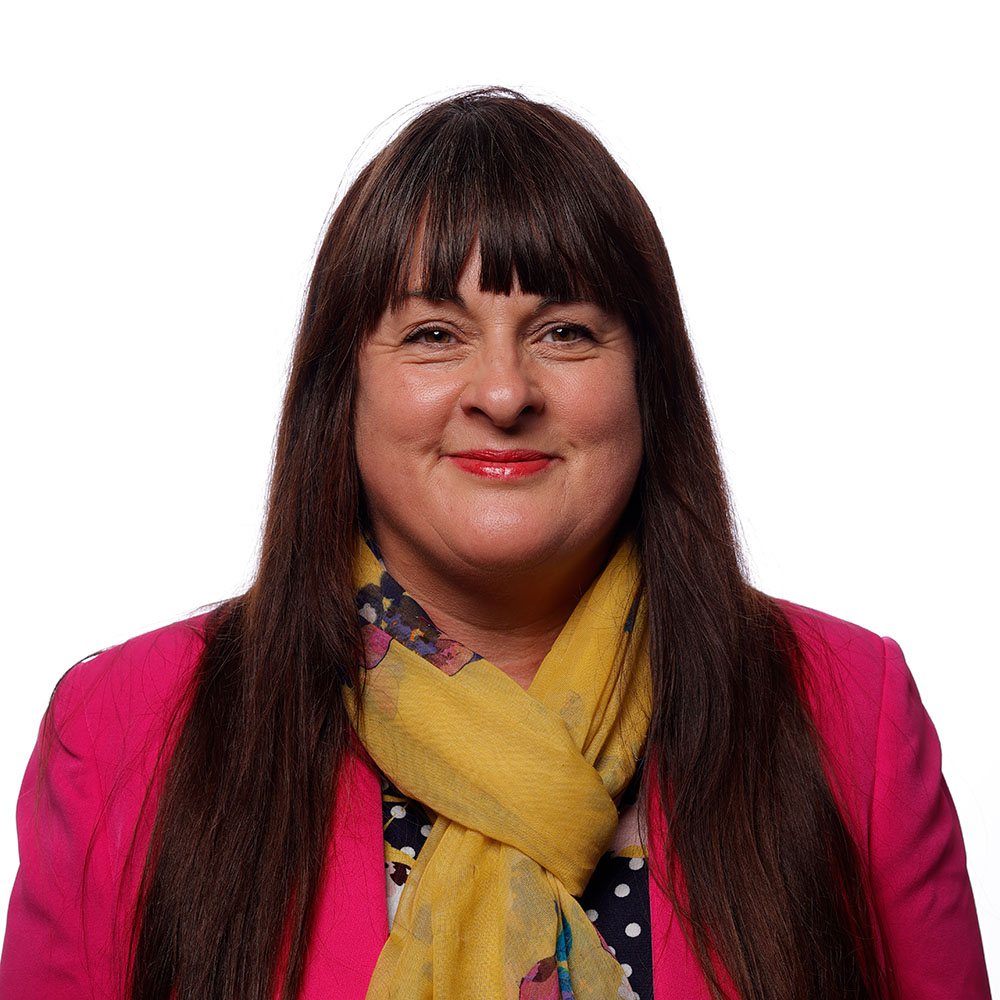
- Official portrait, 2026

Shadow Cabinet Minister for Children and Young People
- Incumbent
- Assumed office 23 September 2026
- Leader: Helen Jenner
- Preceded by: Sarah Cooper-Lesadd

Member of the Senedd for Blaenau Gwent Caerffili Rhymni
- Incumbent
- Assumed office 8 May 2026
- Preceded by: Constituency established

Personal details
- Born: South Wales Valleys
- Party: Reform UK

Catherine Cullen is a British Reform UK politician serving as a Member of the Senedd (MS) for Blaenau Gwent Caerffili Rhymni.

Cullen was born in the South Wales Valleys, She worked in manufacturing before becoming a secondary school teacher specialising in Science. She is married and has six children.

She opposes the blanket 20 mph speed limit in Wales.

In August 2026, her office was vandalised the same week as Benjamin McKenna's, a fellow Reform MS.
