= Gwent Police =

Welsh territorial police force

Gwent Police Heddlu Gwent
- Logo of Gwent Police
- Motto: Protecting and Reassuring; Amddiffyn a Chysuro

Agency overview
- Formed: 1967; 59 years ago
- Preceding agencies: Monmouthshire Constabulary; Newport Borough Police
- Annual budget: £142.2 million (2020/21)

Jurisdictional structure
- Operations jurisdiction: Gwent, Wales
- Gwent Police area within Wales
- Area: 1,554 square kilometres (600 mi^{2})
- Population: 576,700 (2011)
- Primary governing body: Gwent Police and Crime Commissioner
- Secondary governing body: Independent Police Complaints Commission; Independent Office for Police Conduct; Home Office
- General nature: Local civilian police

Operational structure
- Overseen by: His Majesty's Inspectorate of Constabulary and Fire & Rescue Services; Independent Office for Police Conduct
- Headquarters: Llantarnam
- Police officers: 1,308 (plus 70 special constables) (2020)
- PCSOs: 115 (2020)
- Police and Crime Commissioner responsible: Jane Mudd, Labour
- Agency executive: Mark Hobrough, Chief Constable
- Divisions: List: East • Newport • Monmouthshire West • Blaenau Gwent • Caerphilly • Torfaen

Facilities
- Stations: 17
- Vehicles: 174

Website
- www.gwent.police.uk

Gwent Police (Welsh: Heddlu Gwent) is a territorial police force in Wales, responsible for policing the local authority areas of Blaenau Gwent, Caerphilly, Monmouthshire, Newport and Torfaen.

The force was formed in 1967 by the amalgamation of Monmouthshire Constabulary and Newport Borough Police. In 1974 its area was realigned to cover the new administrative county of Gwent, and in 1996, it was expanded again to cover the former Rhymney Valley district area that had become part of the Caerphilly county borough.

As of March 2020, the force has 1,308 police officers, 70 special constables, 115 police community support officers (PCSO), 40 police support volunteers (PSV), and 647 staff.

== Organisation ==
=== Governance ===
Like most police forces in England and Wales, Gwent Police is overseen by the elected Gwent Police and Crime Commissioner (PCC), who replaced the former police authority of councillors, magistrates and lay members in 2012. The PCC is currently Jane Mudd.

=== Structure ===
Gwent Police has two local policing areas:

- East – Newport and Monmouthshire
- West – Caerphilly, Blaenau Gwent and Torfaen

These divisions are run practically independently, controlled by a chief superintendent. Both contain three departments, each under a chief inspector; CID, Neighbourhood Operations (providing community officers and local response) and Neighbourhood Support (including traffic and public order teams, among other things). However, there are still some departments that cover the whole force, including the dog section, rural crime team, and training functions.

The force has its headquarters at Llantarnam in Cwmbran.

=== Collaborations ===
Gwent Police has participated in collaborations with other agencies to improve service and reduce costs at a time of government cuts. Examples of collaborations include:

- Joint Response Unit (with Welsh Ambulance Service) – where a special constable works alongside a paramedic or technician. Funded by the Welsh Ambulance Service and staffed by Gwent Police Special Constabulary.
- Joint Firearms Unit (with Dyfed–Powys Police and South Wales Police)
- Tarian (with Dyfed-Powys Police and South Wales Police) – regional organised crime unit.
- Wales Extremism and Counter Terrorism Unit (with Dyfed-Powys Police, South Wales Police and North Wales Police)
- South Wales Joint Scientific Investigation Unit (with South Wales Police) – processes all forensic submissions
- Air support is provided by the National Police Air Service (NPAS) – mainly using NPAS47, a Eurocopter EC135 Police Helicopter based at MOD St Athan, supported by NPAS43 from Almondsbury near Bristol.
- Missing Children's Unit (with local councils)
- Youth Offending Service (with local councils, healthcare bodies, Child and Adolescent Mental Health Services (CAMHS), and Probation Service).
- Joint Legal Services (with South Wales Police)
- Joint Printing Unit (with South Wales Police)
- Record Management (with South Wales Police)

=== Police stations and offices ===
Gwent Police operate both fully-fledged police stations, and several offices and shops that serve as points of contact with the public. For example, the police station at Abertillery closed due to budget cuts, but the police still maintain a presence at the local fire station. In Abergavenny, neighbourhood officers are available at a "one stop shop" shared with Monmouthshire County Council. On the other hand, several buildings are owned for operational or administrative purposes that are not open to the public, including the force headquarters in Cwmbran. Newport Central police station is the only front desk service that is available 24 hours a day, a custody suite is based at the station. Several front offices and stations have been partially or fully closed following a review of the function and role of front desks in police stations.

== Chief constables ==
- 1967–1981: William Farley
- 1981–1994: John Over
- 1994–1996: Sir Anthony Burden
- 1997–1999: Francis J. Wilkinson
- 1999–?: Keith Turner
- 2004–2008: Michael Tonge
- 2008–2010: Mick Giannasi
- 2011–2013: Carmel Napier
- 2013–2017: Jeff Farrar
- 2017–June 2019: Julian Williams
- June 2019–December 2024: Pam Kelly
- December 2024 -Present: Mark Hobrough

== Media engagement ==
In 2009, Gwent Police worked with film maker Peter Watkins-Hughes to create the short film Cow as part of a campaign to stop texting while driving. The film earned honours in the Advertising Age's weekly Creativity Top 5 video and became an overnight worldwide internet hit after being shown on the USA The Today Show television show.

In 2019, a mugshot of a wanted drug dealer that Gwent Police had posted to Facebook received than 89,000 comments, many of which mocked his hairstyle. Gwent Police warned that abusive comments could be against the law.

== See also ==
- List of law enforcement agencies in the United Kingdom, Crown Dependencies and British Overseas Territories
- Law enforcement in the United Kingdom
