= Niamh Salkeld =

Welsh politician (born 1998 or 1999)

Niamh Salkeld MS
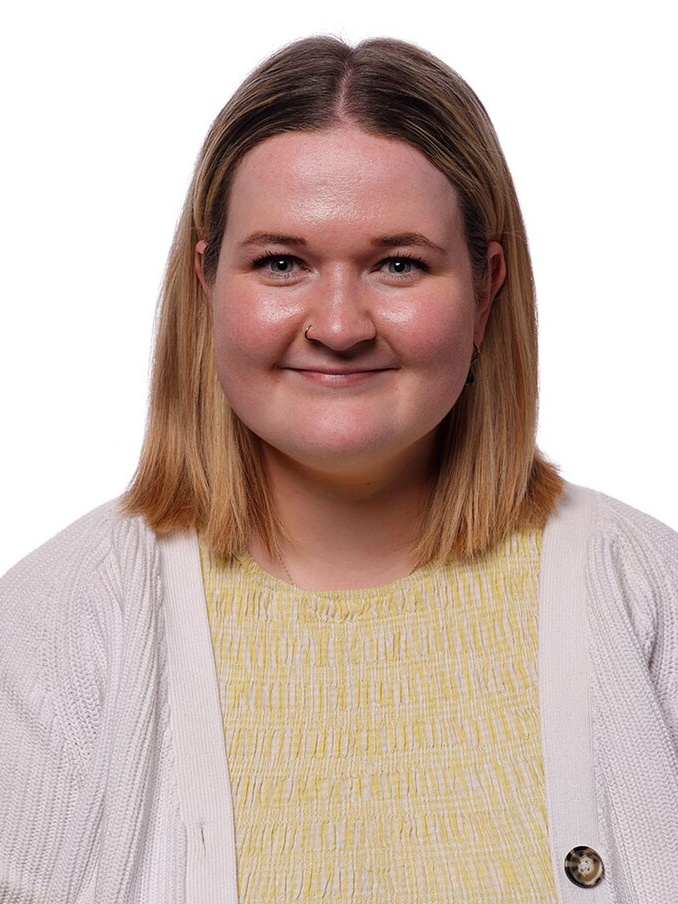
- Official portrait, 2026

Member of the Senedd
- Incumbent
- Assumed office 8 May 2026
- Constituency: Blaenau Gwent Caerffili Rhymni

Personal details
- Born: 1998 or 1999 (age 27–28) Newport, Wales
- Party: Plaid Cymru
- Education: Aberystwyth University (BA, MA)

Niamh Salkeld (born 1998 or 1999) is a Welsh Plaid Cymru politician who has served as a member of the Senedd (MS) for Blaenau Gwent Caerffili Rhymni since May 2026.

== Early life ==
Salkeld was born in Newport, Wales, in 1998 or 1999, and attended Ysgol Cymraeg Cwmbran then Ysgol Gyfun Gwynllyw. She later attended Aberystwyth University, where she studied international relations and graduated with a Bachelor of Arts and master's degree.

Following graduation, Salkeld worked as a substitute teacher in a Welsh-speaking secondary school, before working as a political researcher for the Plaid Cymru group at the Senedd. She previously worked for Steffan Lewis, Assembly Member for South Wales East.

== Political career ==
In the 2024 general election, Salkeld unsuccessfully ran as the Plaid Cymru candidate for Blaenau Gwent and Rhymney. She came second, receiving 3,844 votes (12.8%) and was not elected, losing to Labour candidate Nick Smith.

In the 2026 Senedd election, Salkeld was elected as a Member of the Senedd (MS) for the six-member Blaenau Gwent Caerffili Rhymni constituency, with Plaid receiving 36,136 votes (41%). She was third on Plaid's list of candidates for the constituency.

Salkeld is a member of the Senedd Climate Change, Environment, Sustainability and Rural Affairs Committee and Culture, Communications, Cymraeg and Sport Committee.

=== Electoral history ===
Election	Seat	Party	Votes	Percentage (%)	Result	Source
General, 2024	Blaenau Gwent and Rhymney	Plaid Cymru	3,844	12.8	Not elected	
Senedd, 2026	Blaenau Gwent Caerffili Rhymni	Plaid Cymru	29,314	42	Elected	

== Personal life ==
Salkeld is from Cwm, Blaenau Gwent.

== See also ==
- 7th Senedd
- List of Plaid Cymru MSs
- List of female members of the Senedd
