= Carmel Napier =

Chief Constable Carmel Napier
- Born: August 1960 (age 65–66)
- Occupation: Chief Constable
- Employer: Gwent Police
- Predecessor: Mick Giannasi
- Successor: Jeff Farrar

Carmel Napier, QPM (born August 1960) is a British retired senior police officer. She served as Chief Constable of Gwent Police in South Wales from 2011 to 2013.

== Early life ==
Napier holds a BA Honours (BA Hons) degree in English and Music; a Licentiate of Trinity College London, and a Diploma in Applied Criminology from the Institute of Criminology, University of Cambridge.

== Police career ==
Napier joined Hertfordshire Constabulary in 1983. She was then promoted to Superintendent with North Yorkshire Police, the head of the Complaints and Professional Standards Department. In 2002, she was promoted to Detective Chief Superintendent as Head of Specialist Support. After completion of the Strategic Command Course, she was appointed Temporary Assistant Chief Constable. In October 2006 she joined Essex Police as Assistant Chief Constable responsible for the Territorial Policing and Partnerships.

On 4 September 2008, she joined Gwent Police as Deputy Chief Constable, appointed Chief Constable-designate in January 2011, a position she fulfilled from April 2011.

Napier resigned from Gwent Police in June 2013 following a threat from the then Police and Crime Commissioner, Ian Johnston, that if she did not leave he would dismiss her. Johnston disagreed with Napier's management style and claimed crime figures had been manipulated. During a review of the role of PCC's both Napier and Johnston appeared before a House of Commons select committee to give accounts of her resignation.

== Personal life ==
Napier's husband James is a retired businessman.

== Honours ==

Police appointments
Preceded by Mick Giannasi	Chief Constable of Gwent Police; 2011 - 2013	Succeeded by Jeff Farrar
