= Gwent Police and Crime Commissioner =

- Incumbent; Jane Mudd since 9 May 2024
- Police and crime commissioner of Gwent Police
- Reports to: Gwent Police and Crime Panel
- Appointer: Electorate in Gwent Police area
- Term length: Four years
- Constituting instrument: Police Reform and Social Responsibility Act 2011
- Precursor: Gwent Police Authority
- Inaugural holder: Ian Johnston
- Formation: 22 November 2012
- Deputy: Deputy Police and Crime Commissioner
- Salary: £73,300
- Website: www.gwent.pcc.police.uk/en/home/

The Gwent Police and Crime Commissioner is the police and crime commissioner for the Gwent Police area, comprising Newport, Caerphilly, Blaenau Gwent, Torfaen and Monmouthshire. The current commissioner is Jane Mudd, who represents the Labour Party. The post was first elected in November 2012 and replaced the Gwent Police Authority as part of the Police Reform and Social Responsibility Act 2011.

== History ==
The first Gwent Police and Crime Commissioner was Ian Johnston. During his period of office, Johnston reopened several police stations across Gwent, and he also launched the force's Victims Charter. Johnston was involved in the controversial removal of chief constable Carmel Napier a year into his post. Johnston retired as Police and Crime Commissioner on 7 May 2016.

In June 2016, Labour candidate Jeffrey Cuthbert was elected to the role of commissioner. Cuthbert received a total of 96,030 votes, 30,000 ahead of his nearest rival. Cuthbert was re-elected in May 2021, securing 41.8% of the total first preference vote. By March 2024, Cuthbert had reinvested £2 million into community projects in Gwent. Cuthbert announced he would not be contesting the May 2024 elections. Four candidates were nominated to become the third Gwent Police and Crime Commissioner representing Plaid Cymru, Welsh Labour, Welsh Conservatives and Welsh Liberal Democrats at a vote held on 2 May 2024. On 3 May 2024, it was announced that Jane Mudd, Newport Council Leader, was elected. On 8 May 2024, Mudd was officially sworn in.

== List of Gwent Police and Crime Commissioners ==
Name	Political party	From	To
Ian Johnston	Independent	22 November 2012	11 May 2016
Jeffrey Cuthbert	Labour	12 May 2016	8 May 2024
Jane Mudd	Labour	9 May 2024	Incumbent

== Election results ==
=== 2012 ===
Gwent Police and Crime Commissioner election, 2012
Party	Candidate	1st round		2nd round			1st round votesTransfer votes, 2nd round
Party	Candidate	Total	Of round	Transfers	Total	Of round	1st round votesTransfer votes, 2nd round
Independent	Ian Johnston	23,531	39.64%	6,217	29,748	54.7%	
Labour	Hamish Sandison	23,087	38.89%	1,549	24,636	45.3%	
Conservative	Nick Webb	6,630	11.17%				
Independent	Christopher Wright	6,118	10.31%				
Turnout		59,366	13.97%				
Rejected ballots		1,555	2.55%				
Total votes		60,921	14.34				
Registered electors		424,903					
Independent win							

=== 2016 ===
Gwent Police and Crime Commissioner election, 2016
Party	Candidate	1st round		2nd round			1st round votesTransfer votes, 2nd round
Party	Candidate	Total	Of round	Transfers	Total	Of round	1st round votesTransfer votes, 2nd round
Labour	Jeff Cuthbert	76,893	46.4%	19,137	96,030	61.6%	
Conservative	Louise Brown	50,985	30.8%	8,946	59,931	38.4%	
Plaid Cymru	Darren Jones	37,916	22.9%				
Turnout			42.0%				
Rejected ballots							
Total votes							
Registered electors							
Labour gain from Independent							

=== 2021 ===
2021 Gwent police and crime commissioner election
Party	Candidate	1st round		2nd round			1st round votesTransfer votes, 2nd round
Party	Candidate	Total	Of round	Transfers	Total	Of round	1st round votesTransfer votes, 2nd round
Labour	Jeff Cuthbert*	75,775	41.79%	16,841	92,616	60.47%	
Conservative	Hannah Jarvis	52,313	28.85%	8,223	60,536	39.53%	
Plaid Cymru	Donna Cushing	29,392	16.21%				
Independent	Paul Harley	13,601	7.50%				
Liberal Democrats	John Miller	7,640	4.21%				
Gwlad	Clayton Jones	2,615	1.44%				
Turnout		181,336					
Total votes		181,336					
Labour hold							

=== 2024 ===
2024 Gwent police and crime commissioner election
Party	Candidate	Votes	%	±%
Labour Co-op	Jane Mudd	28,476	41.7	−0.1
Conservative	Hannah Jarvis	21,919	32.1	+3.2
Plaid Cymru	Donna Cushing	9,864	14.4	−1.8
Liberal Democrats	Mike Hamilton	8,078	11.8	+7.6
Turnout		68,337		
Labour Co-op hold		Swing		
