= Jane Mudd =

Welsh politician (born 1968)

Gwent Police and Crime Commissioner
- Incumbent
- Assumed office 9 May 2024
- Preceded by: Jeffrey Cuthbert

Newport City Councillor for Malpas Ward
- Incumbent
- Assumed office 3 May 2012
- Preceded by: Bill Langsford

Leader of Newport City Council
- In office 18 November 2019 – 21 May 2024
- Preceded by: Debbie Wilcox
- Succeeded by: Dimitri Batrouni

Personal details
- Party: Labour and Co-operative Party

Jane Mudd (born October 1968) is a Welsh politician for the Labour and Co-operative Party, serving as Gwent Police and Crime Commissioner (PCC) since 2024, and Newport City Councillor for Malpas since 2012. She was Leader of Newport City Council from November 2019, until she resigned as leader at the Council's AGM on 21 May 2024 after winning the PCC election, whilst retaining her councillor role.

== Political career ==
=== Local government ===
In 2012, Mudd was first elected to represent Newport's Malpas ward.

Mudd is the Welsh Local Government Association spokesperson on Community Safety and co-chairs the Wales Community Safety Board.

In 2019, she was selected as Leader of Newport City Council, following the elevation of Baroness Debbie Wilcox to the House of Lords.

=== Police and crime commissioner ===
In November 2023 it was announced that Jeffrey Cuthbert would not be seeking reelection to the role of Police and Crime Commissioner for Gwent. Mudd was simultaneously announced to have been selected to be the Labour party candidate for the role, by a closed party process, prompting allegations of a 'stitch-up'. In May 2024, Mudd was elected to the role, becoming the first woman to be elected to the role of police and crime commissioner in Wales.

=== 2024 Welsh Labour Party leadership election ===
Mudd supported Jeremy Miles in the 2024 Welsh Labour leadership election.
