= Shire Hall, Newport =

County building in Newport, Wales

Shire Hall
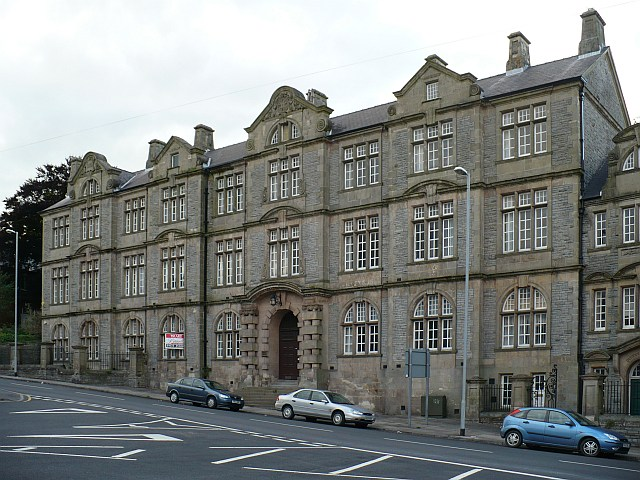
- Shire Hall, Newport

- Location within Newport
- 51.590488°N 3.000586°W
- Location: Newport

History
- Built: 1902

Site notes
- Architect: William Tanner

Listed Building – Grade II
- Designated: 9 October 1998
- Reference no.: 20528

The Shire Hall (Welsh: Neuadd y Sir, Casnewydd) is a municipal building in Newport, south Wales. It is a Grade II listed building.

== History ==
Following the implementation of the Local Government Act 1888, which established county councils in every county, it became necessary to establish a permanent meeting place for the newly formed Monmouthshire County Council. The site selected by county leaders was open land to the west of Queen's Hill in Newport.

The building, which was designed by the county architect, William Tanner, opened as the "County Council Offices" in 1902. The design for the original two-storey structure involved a symmetrical main frontage with five bays facing onto Pentonville with the end bays slightly projected forward; the central section, which also slightly projected forward, featured a porch with a curved pediment; there was triple window on the first floor and gable above with a roundel containing the words: "Monmouthshire County Council 1889". Cadw, has described it as an "impressively-designed Edwardian civic building".

An extra bay to the right, an extra three bays to the left and an extra storey on top of the building were all added in 1913. The Queen's Chambers to the right were also remodelled and given an extra floor at that time and an octagonal shaped council chamber was subsequently built to the rear of the main building. The county council continued to meet at the Shire Hall until the county council was abolished in 1974.

The building continued to be used by the local council as workspace until 1978 and then remained empty until 2012. In May 2011 SK Design submitted plans to convert the building into 20 flats; this proposal was subsequently modified to 19 flats but the proposal did not come to fruition. In May 2013, the hall was sold to Secret Millionaire Jahan Abedi who submitted plans to convert the building into 11 one-bedroom apartments and seven two-bedroom flats with a reception area and a bicycle storage area. Abedi was later quite critical of the bureaucratic challenges he had needed to overcome to obtain a planning consent. Nevertheless, he secured funding from Finance Wales and completed the development in 2014.
