= List of acts of the National Assembly for Wales and acts of Senedd Cymru from 2020 =

This is a list of acts of the National Assembly for Wales and acts of Senedd Cymru passed in 2020. Acts of Senedd Cymru are enacted by Senedd Cymru (the Welsh Parliament; or simply the Senedd), which has legislative authority over devolved matters in relation to Wales under the authority of the Government of Wales Act 2006. Before 6 May 2020, the Senedd was known as the National Assembly for Wales, and acts passed before that date are accordingly known as acts of the National Assembly for Wales. All legislation passed by the Senedd is bilingual, with the English and Welsh texts being equally authoritative. Acts are cited by calendar year, in the same fashion as acts of Parliament of the United Kingdom. Each act passed in a respective year is numbered consecutively with Arabic numerals, following the prefix "anaw" or "asc" respectively (or, in Welsh, "dccc" or "dsc").

3 acts of the National Assembly for Wales and 2 acts of Senedd Cymru were passed in 2020.

indicates that an act has been transcribed on Wikisource, indicates that an act is available to view at legislation.gov.uk, and indicates the location of the original act in the National Library of Wales.

== Acts of the National Assembly for Wales ==
Short title	Citation	Royal assent
Long title
Senedd and Elections (Wales) Act 2020; Deddf Senedd ac Etholiadau (Cymru) 2020	2020 anaw 1; 2020 dccc 1	15 January 2020
An Act of the National Assembly for Wales to rename the National Assembly for Wales, to extend the right to vote in Senedd elections, to amend the law relating to disqualification from membership of the Senedd, to make provision regarding oversight of the work of the Electoral Commission, to make miscellaneous changes to the law relating to the government of Wales and for related purposes. Deddf Cynulliad Cenedlaethol Cymru i ailenwi Cynulliad Cenedlaethol Cymru, i estyn yr hawl i bleidleisio yn etholiadau'r Senedd, i ddiwygio'r gyfraith sy'n ymwneud ag anghymhwyso rhag bod yn Aelod o'r Senedd, i wneud darpariaeth ynghylch goruchwylio gwaith y Comisiwn Etholiadol, i wneud newidiadau amrywiol i'r gyfraith sy'n ymwneud â llywodraethu Cymru, ac at ddibenion cysylltiedig.
National Health Service (Indemnities) (Wales) Act 2020; Deddf y Gwasanaeth Iechyd Gwladol (Indemniadau) (Cymru) 2020	2020 anaw 2; 2020 dccc 2	26 February 2020
An Act of the National Assembly for Wales to amend the National Health Service (Wales) Act 2006 (Note: National Health Service (Wales) Act 2006 (c. 42)) to make provision about indemnities in respect of expenses and liabilities arising in connection with the provision of health services. Deddf Cynulliad Cenedlaethol Cymru i ddiwygio Deddf y Gwasanaeth Iechyd Gwladol (Cymru) 2006 a gwneud darpariaeth ynghylch indemnio treuliau ac atebolrwyddau sy'n codi mewn cysylltiad â darparu gwasanaethau iechyd.
Children (Abolition of Defence of Reasonable Punishment) (Wales) Act 2020; Deddf Plant (Diddymu Amddiffyniad Cosb Resymol) (Cymru) 2020	2020 anaw 3; 2020 dccc 3	20 March 2020
An Act of the National Assembly for Wales to abolish the common law defence of reasonable punishment in relation to corporal punishment of a child taking place in Wales; and for connected purposes. Deddf Cynulliad Cenedlaethol Cymru i ddiddymu amddiffyniad cosb resymol yn y gyfraith gyffredin mewn perthynas â rhoi cosb gorfforol i blentyn sy'n digwydd yng Nghymru; ac at ddibenion cysylltiedig.

== Acts of Senedd Cymru ==
Short title	Citation	Royal assent
Long title
Health and Social Care (Quality and Engagement) (Wales) Act 2020; Deddf Iechyd a Gofal Cymdeithasol (Ansawdd ac Ymgysylltu) (Cymru) 2020	2020 asc 1; 2020 dsc 1	1 June 2020
An Act of the National Assembly for Wales (Note: Despite being an act of Senedd Cymru, the long title erroneously begins with the words "An Act of the National Assembly for Wales". Correspondingly, in Welsh, the long title erroneously begins "Deddf Cynulliad Cenedlaethol Cymru".) to make provision for a duty to secure improvement in the quality of health services provided under or by virtue of the National Health Service (Wales) Act 2006 (Note: National Health Service (Wales) Act 2006 (c. 42)); for a duty of candour in respect of health services provided by or for NHS bodies; for the Citizen Voice Body for Health and Social Care, Wales; about the constitution of NHS trusts; and for connected purposes. Deddf Cynulliad Cenedlaethol Cymru i wneud darpariaeth ar gyfer dyletswydd i sicrhau gwelliant yn ansawdd y gwasanaethau iechyd a ddarperir o dan neu yn rhinwedd Deddf y Gwasanaeth Iechyd Gwladol (Cymru) 2006; ar gyfer dyletswydd gonestrwydd mewn cysylltiad â'r gwasanaethau iechyd a ddarperir gan neu ar gyfer cyrff y GIG; ar gyfer Corff Llais y Dinesydd ar gyfer Iechyd a Gofal Cymdeithasol, Cymru; ynghylch cyfansoddiad ymddiriedolaethau'r GIG; ac at ddibenion cysylltiedig.
Wild Animals and Circuses (Wales) Act 2020; Deddf Anifeiliaid Gwyllt a Syrcasau (Cymru) 2020	2020 asc 2; 2020 dsc 2	7 September 2020
An Act of the National Assembly for Wales to make it an offence to use wild animals in travelling circuses; and to make miscellaneous changes to the licensing of circuses and dangerous wild animals. Deddf Cynulliad Cenedlaethol Cymru i'w gwneud yn drosedd i ddefnyddio anifeiliaid gwyllt mewn syrcasau teithiol; ac i wneud newidiadau amrywiol i drefniadau trwyddedu syrcasau ac anifeiliaid gwyllt peryglus.
