= Office for the Welsh Legislative Counsel =

Legislative drafting office in Wales

The newest of the United Kingdom's legislative drafting offices, the (Welsh) Office of the Legislative Counsel was created in 2007 in anticipation of the coming into force of the Government of Wales Act 2006.

== Duties ==
The Office of the Legislative Counsel is a team of specialist government lawyers who draft Welsh laws.

The office's main role is to give effect to Welsh Government policies by drafting legislation. The office also advises the Welsh Government on matters of legislative competence, interpretation and procedure. The office is accountable to the Counsel General for Wales, a member of the Welsh Government.

Welsh primary legislation must fall within the devolved competence of the Senedd (the Welsh Parliament) and be consistent with the rights protected by the European Convention on Human Rights. The Office drafts legislation in both Welsh and English: Acts of Senedd Cymru must be enacted in both languages, with each language having equal legal status.

The office also seeks to draft legislation in a way that is consistent with the Welsh Government's wider responsibility to the rule of law. The way in which laws are drafted make a key contribution to a properly functioning legal system: laws must be drafted clearly to promote public understanding and to avoid unfair enforcement; laws must avoid contradictions; and laws must not command the impossible.

The Office of the Legislative Counsel shares a responsibility, along with legislators and policy makers, to maintain the clarity and order of laws applicable to Wales on what is commonly referred to as the statute book. Working within a single England and Wales jurisdiction and within the context of existing legislation that was enacted both for Wales and England (or the United Kingdom as a whole), the aim is to separate and demarcate Welsh laws where practicable.

== List of First Legislative Counsel (heads of office) ==
- Professor Thomas Glyn Watkin QC, 2007–2010
- Dylan M Hughes, 2011–
