= Constitution Committee =

Select committee of the UK House of Lords

The Constitution Committee is a cross-party select committee of the House of Lords, the upper chamber of the Parliament of the United Kingdom. The committee's remit is "to examine the constitutional implications of all public bills coming before the House; and to keep under review the operation of the constitution". There is no consolidated written constitution in the United Kingdom, but the committee has defined the constitution as "the set of laws, rules and practices that create the basic institutions of the state, and its component and related parts, and stipulate the powers of those institutions and the relationship between the different institutions and between those institutions and the individual".

The committee has two main functions: examining public bills for matters of constitutional significance; and investigating wider constitutional issues.

== Scrutiny ==
The function of the committee is not to resist constitutional change, but to ensure that when such change takes places through legislation, this occurs as the result of a conscious decision of Parliament, reached where possible after informed debate.

When the committee looks at a bill, it asks if the bill raises issues of principle affecting a principal part of the constitution. If the committee thinks it does, it may request information from the minister responsible for the bill or seek advice more widely. The committee can simply publish the correspondence with the minister, or publish a report on the bill where this is thought to be necessary or desirable. These reports inform the deliberations of the House of Lords on the bill in question.

In 2010 and 2011, scrutiny reports looked at the following bills:

- Public Bodies Bill (which became the Public Bodies Act 2011)
- Police (Detention and Bail) Bill (which became the Police (Detention and Bail) Act 2011)

The committee also used to carry out pre-legislative scrutiny of Welsh Legislative Competence Orders. This function ceased following the referendum in Wales in March 2011 by which the Assembly was given power to legislate directly. Examples of scrutiny reports on Welsh Legislative Competence Orders include:

- The National Assembly for Wales (Legislative Competence) (Social Welfare) Order 2009 (relating to Carers) 13th Report of Session 2008–09
- Scrutiny of Welsh Legislative Competence Orders (December 2007)

== Inquiries ==
The committee fulfils the second limb of its remit by carrying out longer investigative inquiries into wider constitutional issues. Once the committee has chosen a subject, it engages a specialist adviser (an external expert in the field) and written submissions are invited. The committee then takes oral evidence from a range of witnesses, including government ministers, and can also undertake visits.

The committee then publishes a report based on the evidence received, which makes recommendations aimed principally at the Government. The Government is obliged to produce a formal written response to the committee's recommendations. The report and the Government response are then usually debated in the House of Lords.

Recent inquiries have looked into:

- The Process of Constitutional Change (July 2011)
- The Cabinet Manual (March 2011)
- Money Bills and Commons Financial Privileges (February 2011)

== Chairs ==
Committee chairs include those listed below.

Name	Start	End	Party
The Lord Goodlad	2008	2010	Conservative
The Baroness Jay of Paddington	22 June 2010	14 May 2014	Labour
The Lord Lang of Monkton	12 June 2014	27 April 2017	Conservative
The Baroness Taylor of Bolton	27 June 2017	19 January 2022	Labour
The Baroness Drake	19 January 2022	30 January 2025	Labour
The Lord Strathclyde	30 January 2025	present	Conservative

== Membership ==
As of June 2026, the membership of the committee is as follows:

Member	Party
Lord Strathclyde(Chair)	Conservative
Lord Beith	Liberal Democrat
Lord Bellamy	Conservative
Lord Bichard	Crossbench
Lord Burnett of Maldon	Crossbench
Lord Cryer	Labour
Lord Griffiths of Burry Port	Labour
Baroness Hamwee	Liberal Democrat
Lord Jones of Penybont	Labour
Baroness Laing of Elderslie	Conservative
Lord Murphy of Torfaen	Labour
Lord Waldegrave of North Hill	Conservative

== See also ==
- Parliamentary committees of the United Kingdom
