= Order in Council =

Legislative order in many countries

An Order in Council (abbreviated as OIC in some countries) is a type of legal instrument issued by the executive branch of a government, often the head of state or their representatives, on the advice of a cabinet or council of ministers. These instruments are used in several Commonwealth realms, with equivalent instruments also found in countries with a Westminster system of government. Although the specifics vary by country, Orders in Council typically allow the executive to make formal decisions or regulations without enacting new primary legislation.

== Types, usage and terminology ==
There are two principal types of order in council: orders in council whereby the King-in-Council exercises the royal prerogative, and orders in council made in accordance with an act of Parliament.

In the United Kingdom, orders are formally made by the monarch with the advice of the Privy Council (King-in-Council or Queen-in-Council). In Canada, federal orders in council are made in the name of the Governor General by the King's Privy Council for Canada; provincial orders-in-council are of the Lieutenant-Governor-in-Council by the provincial Executive Council. In other places in name of the governor by the executive council (Governor-in-Council, Governor-General-in-Council, etc.).

In New Zealand, the orders in council, undertaken by the Executive Council, are required to give effect to the government's decisions. Apart from acts of Parliament, orders in council are the main method by which the government implements decisions that need legal force.

=== Prerogative orders ===
An order in council made under the royal prerogative does not depend on any statute for its authority, although an act of Parliament may change this. Prerogative orders in council are a form of primary legislation. This type has become less common with the passage of time, as statutes encroach on areas that used to form part of the royal prerogative.

Matters which still fall within the royal prerogative and hence are regulated by (prerogative) orders in council include the prorogation of Parliament, royal charters, and the governance of British Overseas Territories.

British Orders in Council may occasionally be used to effectively reverse court decisions or enforce British law applicable to British Overseas Territories without involving Parliament such as the Caribbean Territories (Abolition of Death Penalty for Murder) Order 1991. Within the United Kingdom itself, court decisions can be formally overruled only by an act of Parliament or by the decision of a higher court on appeal.

In the rest of the Commonwealth they are used to carry out any decisions made by the cabinet and the executive that would not need to be approved by Parliament.

It was long thought that prerogative orders, being primary legislation, were not subject to judicial review. This was reversed in the 1985 case Council of Civil Service Unions v Minister for the Civil Service, which, however, allowed for some exceptions, such as national security. A given prerogative order therefore may or may not be subject to judicial review, depending on its nature.

=== Statutory orders ===
In this second case, an Order in Council is made under powers conferred by legislation and is normally subject to parliamentary procedure. In the UK, if the parent legislation was passed after 1 January 1948, when the Statutory Instruments Act 1946 came into force, such orders in council are a form of statutory instrument. Like all statutory instruments, they may simply be required to be laid before both Houses of Parliament, or they may be annulled in pursuance of a resolution of either the lower house (House of Commons in the UK and Canada or House of Representatives in the other realms) or the upper house (House of Lords in the UK or Senate in other realms) ('negative resolution procedure'), or require to be approved by a resolution of either or, exceptionally, both houses ('affirmative resolution procedure'). That said, the use of Orders in Council has been extended more recently, as the Scotland Act 1998 provides that draft Orders in Council may be laid before the Scottish Parliament in certain circumstances in the same way as they would have been laid before the Westminster Parliament. From 2007, legislation put before the Welsh Assembly is enacted through Orders in Council after following the affirmative resolution procedure.

An Order in Council of this type usually has the following form: "His Majesty, in pursuance of [relevant section of primary legislation], is pleased, by and with the advice of His Privy Council, to order, and it is hereby ordered, as follows:"

Section 20(1) of the Civil Contingencies Act 2004 allows the King in Council to exercise a measure of legislative power in the event of an emergency.

Other matters dealt with by statutory Orders in Council include the closure of burial grounds under the Burial Act 1853, approval of statutes made by Oxford or Cambridge colleges under the Universities of Oxford and Cambridge Act 1923, and the appointment of HM Inspectors of Education, Children's Services and Skills under the Education and Inspections Act 2006. Statutory Orders in Council approving statutes made by Durham or Newcastle universities under the Universities of Durham and Newcastle-upon-Tyne Act 1963 are specifically excluded from the provisions of the Statutory Instruments Act 1946.

Under the Government of Wales Act 2006, royal assent to Measures of the National Assembly for Wales was given by Order in Council, but this is not done by statutory instrument but in a form similar to that of a prerogative order. The National Assembly became the Senedd (Welsh Parliament; Welsh: Senedd Cymru) in 2020, at the same time gaining the competence to pass Acts of Senedd Cymru, assent to which is given by letters patent without requiring the involvement of the Privy Council.

==== Northern Ireland ====
For most of the period from 1972 to 2007, much Northern Ireland legislation was made by order in Council as part of direct rule. This was done under the various Northern Ireland Acts 1974 to 2000, and not by virtue of the royal prerogative.

The use of orders in Council during direct rule is classified as "primary legislation" and not "subordinate legislation" according to section 21 of the Human Rights Act 1998 – subordinate legislation continued to be fulfilled by statutory rules.

== Controversial uses ==
=== Canada ===
After the British Empire entered World War I on the Allied side, an Order in Council was made in Canada for the registration and in certain cases for the internment of aliens of "enemy nationality". Between 1914 and 1920, 8,579 "enemy aliens" were detained in internment camps.

During the Second World War, the Soviet newspaper Trud accused poet and university professor Watson Kirkconnell, who was known to be both a Ukrainophile and a publicist of human rights abuses under Stalinism, of being "the Führer of Canadian Fascism". It is now well documented that Canadian Prime Minister Mackenzie King seriously considered acting to protect the Soviet-Canadian military alliance against Nazi Germany by silencing Kirkconnell with an Order in Council.

An Order in Council made by the Brian Mulroney government on 21 November 1988 created Amex Bank of Canada, a Canadian banking subsidiary of American Express, although federal banking policy at the time would not ordinarily have permitted such an establishment by a foreign company.

In July 2004 and August 2006, Orders in Council were used to deny a passport to Abdurahman Khadr, a member of the Khadr family who had previously been held in detention by the United States at Guantanamo Bay, on the grounds of national security. The first was overturned on judicial review by the Federal Court as, at the time of his application, national security was not included as a ground for refusal in the Canadian Passport Order, which was since amended to include the ground.

In July 2017, the government of Canada used an Order in Council to strip ex-Nazi interpreter Helmut Oberlander of his Canadian citizenship.

On May 1, 2020, an Order in Council was used to declare over 1,500 models of firearm to be prohibited weapons, in response to the 2020 Nova Scotia attacks. The order immediately nullified the existing registrations of ownership for all the firearms it affected, making it illegal for owners to possess, use, transport, or sell them except in a few limited circumstances. A second Order in Council was simultaneously passed declaring an amnesty period until April 30, 2022, in which time owners of newly-prohibited firearms could have them deactivated, destroyed, or exported to a country in which they could be legally owned. The amnesty period had been extended expiring October 30, 2025.

=== United Kingdom ===
Orders in Council were controversially used in 2004 to overturn a court ruling in the United Kingdom that held that the exile of the Chagossians from the British Indian Ocean Territory (BIOT) was unlawful. Initially, the High Court in 2006 held that these Orders in Council were unlawful: "The suggestion that a minister can, through the means of an order in council, exile a whole population from a British Overseas Territory and claim that he is doing so for the 'peace, order and good government' of the territory is to us repugnant." The UK government's first appeal failed, with the Court of Appeal holding that the decision had been unlawfully taken by a government minister "acting without any constraint". However, the government successfully appealed to the House of Lords, which overturned the High Court and Court of Appeal decisions (R v Secretary of State for Foreign and Commonwealth Affairs, ex parte Bancoult (No 2)). The Law Lords decided that the validity of an order in council made under the prerogative legislating for a colony was amenable to judicial review. Also, it was not for the courts to substitute their judgement for that of the Secretary of State as to what was conducive to the peace, order and good government of the BIOT. The orders were not Wednesbury unreasonable on the facts, given the considerations of security and cost of resettlement. Finally, none of the orders was open to challenge in the British courts on the ground of repugnancy to any fundamental principle relating to the rights of abode of the Chagossians in the Chagos Islands.

== See also ==
- Delegated legislation
- Executive order (United States)
