= Measure of the National Assembly for Wales =

Form of primary legislation in Wales

The Royal Badge of Wales appears on Assembly Measures.

A Measure of the National Assembly for Wales (Welsh: Mesur gan Gynulliad Cenedlaethol Cymru, informally, an Assembly Measure, Welsh: Mesur y Cynulliad) is primary legislation in Wales that is a category lower than an Act of Parliament. In the case of contemporary Welsh law, the difference with acts is that the competence to pass Measures was subject to 'LCOs' or Legislative Competence Order, which transferred powers to the Assembly by amending Schedule 5 of the Government of Wales Act 2006.

It is a lower form of primary legislation as it did not contain a large bulk of powers compared to the power to make acts. In Wales each Assembly Measure had to be accompanied with a matter which was transferred using the Legislative Competence Order (LCO) system. Each Assembly Measure, like an Act of Parliament, had to have made provision for a matter within the remit of the legislative competency of the Assembly.

Following a referendum held in 2011, the assembly gained powers to make primary legislation, then known as Acts of the Assembly. These powers came into force after the 2011 assembly elections and the assembly is no longer able to pass Measures. Existing measures will remain valid unless repealed by the assembly in the future. Following the Senedd and Elections (Wales) Act 2020, these acts are now referred to as an Act of Senedd Cymru.

== Procedure ==
=== Consideration by the Assembly ===
Similar to Acts, Assembly Measures faced the same style and level of scrutiny. There were around four stages where the proposed legislation was scrutinised. The first stage was the agreement of the principles of the Assembly Measure, which meant the first approval of the legislation for it to be scrutinised, then it would have been scrutinized at committee level, where a committee of Assembly Members could have debated and proposed amendments to the Measure which is then accompanied with debates in 'plenary', which would have been required to approve the amendments.

Once everything above was completed, the Assembly would then have started the final scrutinising before the Assembly Measure would be passed and becomes law. As in other legislative systems, some laws failed, or were withdrawn.

=== Royal approval ===
Assembly Measures, like other types of legislation, had to be approved by a head of state, that head of state being Her Majesty Queen Elizabeth II. After the Assembly Measure was passed by the National Assembly for Wales the Measure still had to be taken to the Queen in Council who approved the Measure via an Order in Council. The approval would later be added to the Assembly Measure as proof of the approval. The approving order in council is not approved by both Houses of Parliament like the Orders in Council conferring power to the Assembly.

=== Proposals ===
Like in other legislatures, the National Assembly for Wales members could have proposed Assembly Measures. The name for an Assembly Measure proposed by a person not in the Welsh Assembly Government was called a "Members Proposed Assembly Measure" Meanwhile, according to the same source there were also "Government Proposed Assembly Measures" and "Emergency Proposed Assembly Measures". The First Welsh Legislative Counsel, a new post which commenced April 2007, working within the Office of the First Welsh Legislative Counsel, part of the Legal Services Department of the Welsh Assembly Government has responsibility for the drafting of the Welsh Assembly Government's legislative programme following the implementation of the Government of Wales Act 2006. Professor Thomas Glyn Watkin is the first person to be appointed to this post.

=== Enacting formula ===
Assembly measures begin with the following enacting formula:

- English: "This Measure, passed by the National Assembly for Wales on [Date] and approved by Her Majesty in Council on [Date], enacts the following provisions:-"
- Welsh: "Mae'r Mesur hwn, a basiwyd gan Gynulliad Cenedlaethol Cymru ar [Dyddiad] ac a gymeradwywyd gan Ei Mawrhydi yn ei Chyngor ar [Dyddiad], yn deddfu'r darpariaethau a ganlyn:-"

== Subjects of measures ==
Part 4 of the Government of Wales Act 2006 gave the Assembly legislative competence in the following 20 "Subjects" outlined on schedule 7 of that act in relation to Measures. (The Assembly does not have competence with respect to all aspects of these subjects.) Since the Assembly gained the competence to pass Acts, these have not been used, but they still apply in relation to previously passed Measures.

- Agriculture, fisheries, forestry and rural development
- Ancient monuments and historic buildings
- Culture
- Economic development
- Education and training
- Environment
- Fire and rescue services and promotion of fire safety
- Food
- Health and health services
- Highways and transport
- Housing
- Local government
- Public administration
- Social welfare
- Sport and recreation
- Tourism
- Town and country planning
- Water and flood defence
- Welsh language

== See also ==
- NHS Redress (Wales) Measure 2008: Assembly Measure
- List of acts and measures of Senedd Cymru
- Act of Senedd Cymru
