= Statutory Instruments Act 1946 =

Act of the Parliament of the United Kingdom

Statutory Instruments Act 1946 (Note: Section 13(1).)
- Act of Parliament
- Parliament of the United Kingdom
- Long title: An Act to repeal the Rules Publication Act, 1893, and to make further provision as to the instruments by which statutory powers to make orders, rules, regulations and other subordinate legislation are exercised
- Citation: 9 & 10 Geo. 6. c. 36
- Territorial extent: England and Wales; Scotland; Northern Ireland (in part); (Note: Section 13(2).)

Dates
- Royal assent: 26 March 1946
- Commencement: 1 January 1948 (Note: Section 10. The Statutory Instruments Act 1946 (Commencement) Order 1947.)

Other legislation
- Repeals/revokes: Rules Publication Act 1893
- Amended by: Defence (Transfer of Functions) (No. 1) Order 1964; Minister for the Civil Service Order 1968; Statute Law (Repeals) Act 1977; Statute Law (Repeals) Act 1986; Statutory Instruments (Production and Sale) Act 1996; Constitutional Reform Act 2005; Government of Wales Act 2006; Transfer of Functions (Statutory Instruments) Order 2006; House of Commons Members' Fund Act 2016; European Union (Withdrawal) Act 2018 (Consequential Amendments) Regulations 2018; Direct Payments to Farmers (Legislative Continuity) Act 2020 (Consequential Amendments) Regulations 2020; Retained EU Law (Revocation and Reform) Act 2023 (Consequential Amendment) Regulations 2023; Legislation (Procedure, Publication and Repeals) (Wales) Act 2025

Status: Amended

Text of statute as originally enacted

Revised text of statute as amended

Text of the Statutory Instruments Act 1946 as in force today (including any amendments) within the United Kingdom, from legislation.gov.uk.

The Statutory Instruments Act 1946 (9 & 10 Geo. 6. c. 36) is an act of the Parliament of the United Kingdom which governs the making of statutory instruments.

Until 2011 the act also governed Scottish statutory instruments made under acts of the Scottish Parliament. Until 2026, the act also governed Welsh statutory instruments made under acts of Senedd Cymru, acts of the National Assembly for Wales, and measures of the National Assembly for Wales.

The Statutory Rules (Northern Ireland) Order 1979 provides a similar function for acts of the Parliament of Northern Ireland and acts of the Northern Ireland Assembly.

== Definitions ==
The act defines statutory instruments as "orders, rules, regulations or other subordinate legislation" if the power is expressed through the royal prerogative through an Order in Council or in the case of a power conferred on a Minister of the Crown, a statutory instrument. The circularity of the definition means that any subordinate legislation exercisable by a minister is a statutory instrument and any subordinate instrument is subordinate legislation. Since the use of ministerial orders in 1992 and 2013 this definition is no longer completely true.

== Procedure ==
=== Consideration by committee ===
The Secondary Legislation Scrutiny Committee, in the House of Lords, and the Select Committee on Statutory Instruments in the House of Commons, are committees set up to consider statutory instruments tabled by ministers.

=== Laying before Parliament ===
Statutory instruments are required to be laid before Parliament.

=== Revocation ===
Statutory instruments may be revoked by statutory instrument (including an Order in Council), or by an act of Parliament.

== Publication ==
Statutory instruments are published by the King's Printer. In the modern era, this means that they are available on legislation.gov.uk.

== Subsequent developments ==
Section 9(2) of the act was repealed by section 1(1) of, and part XII of schedule 1 to, the Statute Law (Repeals) Act 1986, which came into force on 2 May 1986.
