= Legislative Competence Order =

United Kingdom legislation

In Wales, a Legislative Competence Order (LCO; pronounced 'elco', Welsh: Gorchymyn Cymhwysedd Deddfwriaethol) was a piece of constitutional legislation in the form of an Order in Council. It transferred legislative authority from the Parliament of the United Kingdom to the National Assembly for Wales. The LCO had to be approved by the Assembly, the Secretary of State for Wales, both Houses of Parliament, and then the Queen in Council.

Each LCO added a 'matter' to one of the 'fields' stated in schedule 5 of the Government of Wales Act 2006. This is the list of areas in which the National Assembly for Wales may legislate. The only other way that schedule 5 can be amended is by the inclusion of provisions in UK parliamentary bills (referred to as 'Framework Powers' by the UK Government and 'Measure-making powers' by the National Assembly).

Each matter then gave the National Assembly for Wales permission to pass legislation known as an Assembly measure, which operates in Wales just as an act of Parliament operates across the UK (i.e. can be enforced by the courts). An Assembly Measure allows provisions to be made in a certain area, e.g., Health and Social Services, Education, for the Assembly to pass.

The text that came with the LCO contains the actual title of the legislation (measure) that would have been passed by the Welsh Assembly later on, for example "Provision about the curriculum in schools maintained by local education authorities" would appear on the LCO and would later form the title of the Measure once written up.

Following a referendum held in March 2011, the assembly gained the ability to pass bills for acts of the Assembly in all twenty devolved areas without the need for the consent of the UK parliament.

The assembly also lost the ability to pass measures resulting in the LCO process becoming essentially redundant.

== Discussion ==
=== Criticism ===
In a blog for the LSE, the system was criticised for being bureaucratic, cumbersome and has been described as "how to not do devolution".

== Abolition ==
The replacement of the conferred powers model with a reserved powers model had a "cross-party consensus" in 2011.

== List ==
Title	Citation	Date made
The National Assembly for Wales (Legislative Competence) (Conversion of Framework Powers) Order 2007	2007 No. 910	21 March 2007
The National Assembly for Wales (Legislative Competence) (Amendment of Schedule 7 to the Government of Wales Act 2006) Order 2007	2007 No. 2143	25 July 2007
The National Assembly for Wales (Legislative Competence) (Education and Training) Order 2008	2008 No. 1036	9 April 2008
The National Assembly for Wales (Legislative Competence) (Social Welfare) Order 2008	2008 No. 1785	9 July 2008
The National Assembly for Wales (Legislative Competence) (Social Welfare and Other Fields) Order 2008	2008 No. 3132	10 December 2008
The National Assembly for Wales (Legislative Competence) (Agriculture and Rural Development) Order 2009	2009 No. 1758	8 July 2009
The National Assembly for Wales (Legislative Competence) (Exceptions to Matters) Order 2009	2009 No. 3006	17th November 2009
The National Assembly for Wales (Legislative Competence) (Social Welfare) Order 2009	2009 No. 3010	17 November 2009
The National Assembly for Wales (Legislative Competence) (Health and Health Services and Social Welfare) Order 2010	2010 No. 236	10 February 2010
The National Assembly for Wales (Legislative Competence) (Welsh Language) Order 2010	2010 No. 245	10 February 2010
The National Assembly for Wales (Legislative Competence) (Environment) Order 2010	2010 No. 248	10 February 2010
The National Assembly for Wales (Legislative Competence) (Transport) Order 2010	2010 No. 1208	12 April 2010
The National Assembly for Wales (Legislative Competence) (Education) Order 2010	2010 No. 1209	12 April 2010
The National Assembly for Wales (Legislative Competence) (Housing) (Fire Safety) Order 2010	2010 No. 1210	12 April 2010
The National Assembly for Wales (Legislative Competence) (Local Government) Order 2010	2010 No. 1211	12 April 2010
The National Assembly for Wales (Legislative Competence) (Culture and Other Fields) Order 2010	2010 No. 1212	12 April 2010
The National Assembly for Wales (Legislative Competence) (Housing and Local Government) Order 2010	2010 No. 1838	21 July 2010
The National Assembly for Wales (Legislative Competence) (Amendment of Schedule 7 to the Government of Wales Act 2006) Order 2010	2010 No. 2968	15 December 2010
The National Assembly for Wales (Disqualification) Order 2010	2010 No. 2969	15 December 2010
The National Assembly for Wales Referendum (Assembly Act Provisions) (Limit on Referendum Expenses Etc.) Order 2010	2010 No. 2985	15 December 2010
The National Assembly for Wales (Letters Patent) Order 2011	2011 No. 752	16 March 2011
The National Assembly for Wales (Representation of the People) (Fresh Signatures for Absent Voters) Order 2013	2013 No. 1514	19 June 2013
The National Assembly for Wales (Disqualification) Order 2015	2015 No. 1536	15 July 2015
The National Assembly for Wales Commission (Crown Status) Order 2016	2016 No. 159	10 February 2016
The National Assembly for Wales (Representation of the People) (Amendment) Order 2016	2016 No. 272	3 March 2016
The National Assembly for Wales (Representation of the People) (Amendment) (No. 2) Order 2016	2016 No. 292	3 March 2016

=== National Assembly for Wales (Representation of the People) Order 2007 ===
National Assembly for Wales (Representation of the People) Order 2007
- Statutory Instrument
- Parliament of the United Kingdom
- Citation: SI 2007/236

Dates
- Made: 31 January 2007
- Commencement: 1 February 2007
Other legislation
Repeals/revokes	National Assembly for Wales (Representation of the People) Order 2003; National Assembly for Wales (Representation of the People) (Amendment) Order 2006
Made under	Government of Wales Act 1998

Text of statute as originally enacted

Text of the National Assembly for Wales (Representation of the People) Order 2007 as in force today (including any amendments) within the United Kingdom, from legislation.gov.uk.

The National Assembly for Wales (Representation of the People) Order 2007 (SI 2007/236), also known as the "Conduct Order" is a Legislative Competence Order and replacement of the National Assembly for Wales (Representation of the People) Order 2003 which made provision for the conduct of elections and the return of members to the National Assembly for Wales. It was put in place by the Secretary of State for Wales in 2007. In 2017, the enabling powers for the order were devolved to the Welsh Government. The Welsh Government has further amended the order since.

It introduced the following changes:

- To the interpretation article and article 5 so that the references are updated to those in the Government of Wales Act 2006 or to the amendments to the Representation of the People Act 1983 effected by the Electoral Administration Act 2006.
- To the management of Postal Ballots in devolved elections, both for the purposes of election security, and to allow people in Mental Health institutions to vote in person, if their institution permitted it.
- To the requirement in article 39 that the office of the election agent for a regional election need no longer be located in the Assembly electoral region for which the person is the agent but can be located anywhere in Wales.
- To article 114 and 133 to reflect changes made by the Legal Services Act 2007
- To Schedule 1 to correct references to articles in the paragraphs of that schedule.
- To forms in the Appendix of Forms to correct errors or omissions and, in respect of the constituency and regional ballot papers, to update the format of those papers to assist voters.

No impact assessment was carried out for this instrument as it has no significant impact on the costs of business, charities, voluntary bodies or the public sector.

==== Replacement ====
In 2020, the order was amended by the Welsh Government, in the Senedd Cymru (Representation of the People) (Amendment) Act 2020. The enabling powers previously held by the Secretary of State for Wales had been devolved to the Senedd, meaning that Welsh Ministers were now responsible for the order.

In 2024, the Welsh Government mentioned its intention to write a new piece of legislation covering the order's functions for passage before the 2026 Senedd election.

== See also ==
- Measure of the National Assembly for Wales - the laws passed by the National Assembly for Wales once the LCO is passed.
- Act of Parliament
- Statutory Instruments
- Welsh law
