= Thomas Glyn Watkin =

Welsh barrister

Thomas Glyn Watkin KC FLSW (born 1952) is a Welsh lawyer and the first person to be appointed to the post of First Legislative Counsel to the Welsh Government, taking up his post in April 2007.

== First Legislative Counsel ==
Working within the Office of the Legislative Counsel, part of the Welsh Government, Professor Watkin had responsibility for the drafting of the Welsh Government's legislative programme following the implementation of the Government of Wales Act 2006.

== Education ==
Thomas Glyn Watkin was born in the village of Cwmparc in the Rhondda in 1952. He studied law at Pembroke College, Oxford, where he was Oades and Stafford Scholar (1971-1974). He obtained the degrees of BA (1974), BCL (1975) and MA (1977) from the University of Oxford and was called to the bar by the Middle Temple (1976).

== Professional career ==
From 1975 until 2004, he was successively lecturer, senior lecturer, reader and professor in the Law School at the University of Wales, Cardiff, as well as acting as Legal Assistant to the Governing Body of the Church in Wales from 1981 until 1998. He was appointed foundation Professor of Law at the University of Wales, Bangor in 2004.

Known mainly for his work in legal history and civil law, Watkin is a council member of the Selden Society, Secretary and Treasurer of the Welsh Legal History Society and a member of the editorial board of the Journal of Legal History. He was elected to the Academy of Private Lawyers of Milan and Pavia in 2002, and is an ordained priest in the Church in Wales.

In 2013, Watkin was elected a Fellow of the Learned Society of Wales.

In 2019, Watkin was appointed as Queen's Counsel honoris causa. Upon his appointment the Lord Chancellor, David Gauke MP, referred to Watkin's role as the Welsh Government's "...first principal Legislative Draftsman", noting that he was "involved centrally in establishing and building the legislative drafting capacity of the Welsh Government – in both English and Welsh – in the initial years of primary legislative devolution for Wales".

== Publications ==
His principal publications include The Nature of Law (1980), The Italian Legal Tradition (1998) and An Historical Introduction to Modern Civil Law (1999), and, as editor, Legal Record and Historical Reality (1989), The Europeanization of Law (1997), Legal Wales: Its Past; Its Future (2001), The Trial of Dic Penderyn and Other Essays (2003) and Y Cyfraniad Cymreig (2005). His book, Wales: An Introduction to its Legal History, was published in the autumn of 2005.

Legal offices
Preceded by (new post)	First Legislative Counsel to the Welsh Government; 2007–2010	Succeeded by Dylan Hughes 2011-
