= 2011 Welsh devolution referendum =

- 3 March 2011
- Do you want the Assembly now to be able to make laws on all matters in the 20 subject areas it has powers for?

Results
Choice	Votes	%
Yes	517,132	63.49%
No	297,380	36.51%
Valid votes	814,512	99.86%
Invalid or blank votes	1,116	0.14%
Total votes	815,628	100.00%
Registered voters/turnout	2,289,044	35.63%
- Results by principal area

A referendum on the powers of the National Assembly for Wales was held on 3 March 2011. Voters were asked whether the Assembly should have full law-making powers in the twenty subject areas where it has jurisdiction. The referendum asked the question: 'Do you want the Assembly now to be able to make laws on all matters in the 20 subject areas it has powers for?'

If a majority voted 'yes', the Assembly would then be able to make laws, known as Acts of the Assembly, on all matters in the subject areas, without needing the UK Parliament's agreement. If a majority voted 'no', the arrangements at the time of the referendum would have continued – that is, in each devolved area, the Assembly would be able to make its own laws on some matters, but not others. To make laws on any of these other matters, the Assembly would have had to ask the UK Parliament to transfer the powers to it. Regulations for the referendum, and the powers to be approved or rejected by it, were provided for in the Government of Wales Act 2006.

The results of the referendum were announced on 4 March 2011. Overall, 63.49% voted 'yes', and 36.51% voted 'no'. In 21 of 22 local authorities the vote was 'yes', with the exception being Monmouthshire by a slim majority. The overall turnout was 35.2%. First Minister Carwyn Jones, welcoming the result, said: "Today an old nation came of age."

While the referendum was technically non-binding, it gave the Welsh Government the statutory authority to make a ministerial order triggering the relevant changes in the Assembly's powers. The order was duly made on 30 March and came into force on 5 May 2011, the day of the quadrennial Assembly election.

== Background ==
Part IV of the Government of Wales Act 2006 provided for the National Assembly for Wales to pass Acts instead of Measures. Acts required only the consent of the Assembly, whereas Measures required a Legislative Competence Order involving the United Kingdom's Secretary of State for Wales, Parliament, and Privy Council. However, Part IV could not come into force unless an order was made by the Welsh Government after a referendum of Welsh voters.

In the One Wales coalition agreement on 27 June 2007, Welsh Labour and Plaid Cymru made the commitment "to proceed to a successful outcome of a referendum for full law-making powers under Part IV of the Government of Wales Act 2006 as soon as practicable, at or before the end of the Assembly term". The two parties agreed "in good faith to campaign for a successful outcome to such a referendum" and to set up an All-Wales Convention to prepare for such a successful outcome.

On 27 October 2007 the then First Minister Rhodri Morgan and the Deputy First Minister Ieuan Wyn Jones appointed Sir Emyr Jones Parry, the recently retired Permanent Representative from Britain to the United Nations to head the convention. Sir Emyr stated on 22 November 2007 that he would like to begin to work as soon as possible and hoped to have the report ready by 2009 at the latest.

The All Wales Convention reported to the First Minister and the Deputy First Minister on 18 November 2009. It reported that a "yes" vote would be obtainable but not guaranteed. An opinion poll for the convention had found that 47% would vote Yes, and 37% would vote No. The report suggested that the Assembly needed to decide before June 2010 whether to trigger a referendum if the vote was to be held before the next Assembly elections.

On 2 February 2010 the new First Minister Carwyn Jones, who had succeeded Rhodri Morgan on 9 December 2009, confirmed that a trigger vote would be held on 9 February on whether the Assembly should request a referendum on full law making powers. The Welsh Liberal Democrats and Welsh Conservatives stated they did not want the referendum to be held on the same day as the 2011 Assembly elections and would abstain from voting to trigger the referendum if this date was not ruled out. The trigger vote was held in the Assembly on Tuesday 9 February 2010, and was approved unanimously across all parties, with 53 out of the 60 AMs voting for it. Under the Government of Wales Act 2006 the First Minister was required to send a letter within two weeks to the Welsh Secretary (then Peter Hain), who would then have 120 days to lay a draft order for a referendum before Parliament. It was expected that the referendum date would not be set until after the general election.

On 15 June 2010 Cheryl Gillan, the new Welsh Secretary in the Conservative–Liberal Democrat coalition government at Westminster, announced that the referendum would probably be held between January and March 2011. Others proposed that it should be held on 5 May 2011, together with both the Assembly elections and the AV referendum. It was agreed that the referendum be held on 3 March 2011, after representations to the Welsh Secretary from the Welsh Government.

== Referendum question ==
=== Draft question ===
The draft referendum question submitted by the Welsh Secretary to the Electoral Commission on 23 June 2010 was:

At present, the National Assembly for Wales (the Assembly) has powers to make laws for Wales on some subjects within devolved areas. Devolved areas include health, education, social services, local government and environment. The Assembly can gain further powers to make laws in devolved areas with the agreement of the Parliament of the United Kingdom (Parliament) on a subject by subject basis.

If most people vote 'yes' in this referendum, the Assembly will gain powers to pass laws on all subjects in the devolved areas.

If most people vote 'no', then the present arrangements, which transfer that law-making power bit by bit, with the agreement of Parliament each time, will continue.

Do you agree that the Assembly should now have powers to pass laws on all subjects in the devolved areas without needing the agreement of Parliament first?

This wording was, however, criticised by the Welsh Government.

=== Revised question ===
A revised question was released in September 2010:

The National Assembly for Wales - what happens at the moment

The Assembly has powers to make laws on 20 subject areas, such as agriculture, education, the environment, health, housing, local government.

In each subject area, the Assembly can make laws on some matters, but not others. To make laws on any of these other matters, the assembly must ask the UK Parliament for its agreement. The UK Parliament then decides each time whether or not the assembly can make these laws.

The Assembly cannot make laws on subject areas such as defence, tax or welfare benefits, whatever the result of this vote.

If most voters vote 'yes' - the Assembly will be able to make laws on all matters in the 20 subject areas it has powers for, without needing the UK Parliament's agreement.

If most voters vote 'no' - what happens at the moment will continue.

Do you want the Assembly now to be able to make laws on all matters in the 20 subject areas it has powers for?

permitting a simple YES / NO answer (to be marked with a single (X)).

== Opinion polls and comments ==
In 2007, one poll suggested that 47% might say Yes in a referendum vote, with 44% against. A poll in February 2008 saw 49% in favour of a full law-making parliament and 41% against. On 3 February 2010 the Western Mail endorsed the Yes campaign. A BBC poll released on 1 March 2010 (St. David's Day) found that support had risen for full law making powers, up to 56%, with 35% against, although Welsh Conservative leader Nick Bourne (who supported a yes vote) was sceptical of the poll results.

A summary table of poll results in advance of the referendum is set out below.

Date(s) conducted	Polling organisation	Yes	No	Undecided	Won't vote	Lead
25–28 Feb 2011	Research and Marketing Group	49%	22%	28%	-	21%
21–23 Feb 2011	YouGov	67%	33%	-	-	34%
24–26 Jan 2011	YouGov	46%	25%	21%	8%	21%
20–22 Dec 2010	YouGov	48%	30%	14%	8%	18%
25–28 Nov 2010	ICM	70%	30%	-	-	40%
25–28 Nov 2010	ICM	57%	24%	18%	-	33%
22–24 Nov 2010	YouGov	52%	29%	13%	7%	23%
19–22 Nov 2010	Beaufort Research	73%	23%	4%	-	50%
19–22 Nov 2010	Beaufort Research	60%	28%	13%	-	32%
25–27 Oct 2010	YouGov	49%	30%	15%	5%	19%
27–29 Sep 2010	YouGov	48%	32%	15%	6%	16%
26–28 Jul 2010	YouGov	48%	34%	14%	5%	14%

== Overall result ==
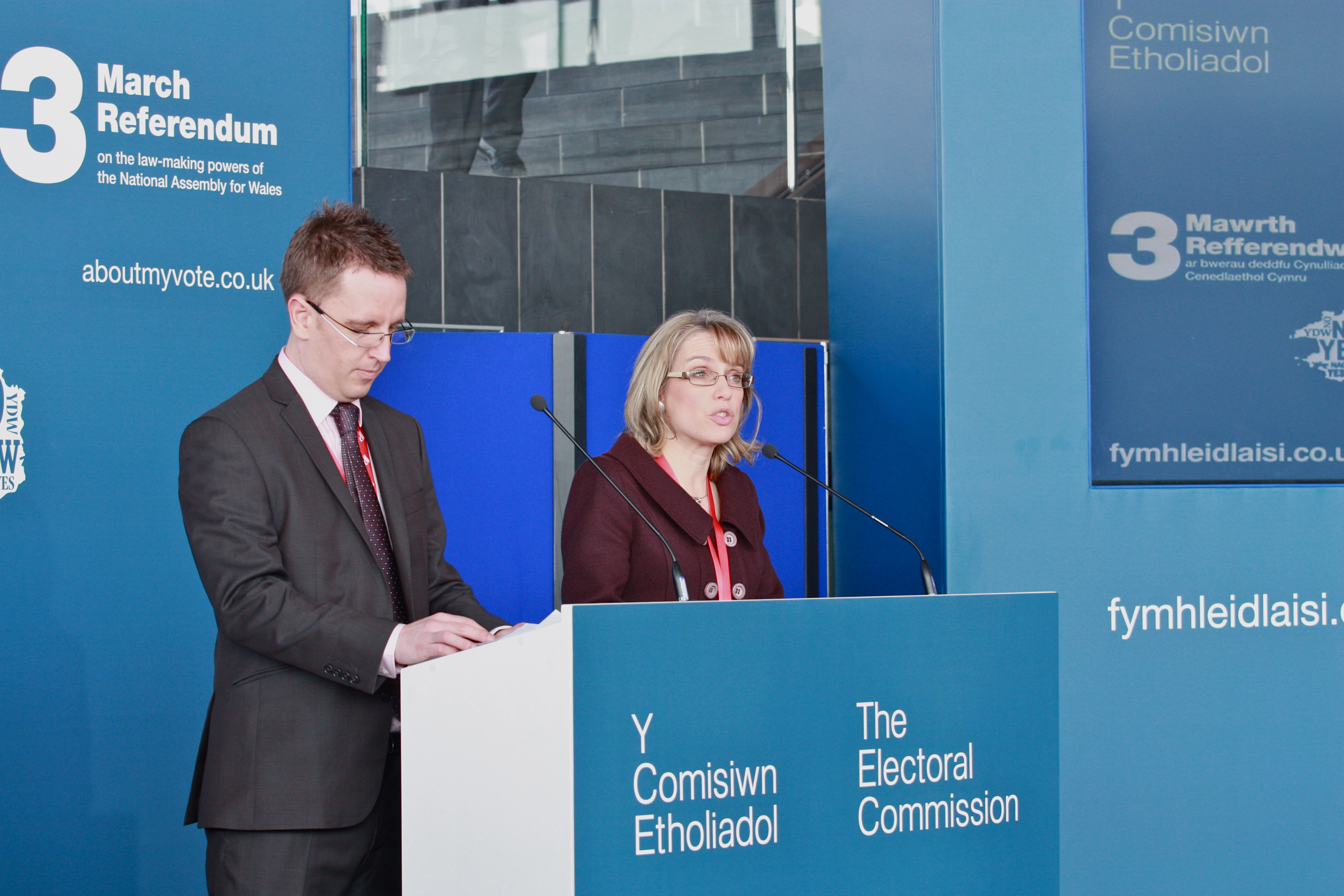
Referendum result announced at the Senedd by Jenny Watson

The results were counted and announced the following day on Friday 4 March 2011, locally initially with the final result declared at the Senedd in Cardiff by the Chair of the Electoral Commission Jenny Watson who announced the result in both Welsh and English.

In 21 of 22 unitary authorities, the vote was Yes. The only counting area to declare a No result was Monmouthshire, which was announced following a recount. The difference was only 320 votes.

Choice	Votes	%
Yes / Ydw	517,572	63.51
No / Nac Ydw	297,380	36.49
Total	814,952	100.00
Valid votes	814,512	99.86
Invalid/blank votes	1,116	0.14
Total votes	815,628	100.00
Registered voters/turnout	2,289,044	35.63
Source: Electoral Commission

Regional referendum results (excluding invalid votes)
Yes; 517,132 (63.5%)	No; 297,380 (36.5%)
▲50%

=== Results by council areas ===
Unitary authority	Votes		Proportion of votes		Turnout
Unitary authority	Yes	No	Yes	No	Turnout
Anglesey	14,401	7,620	64.7%	35.3%	43.8%
Blaenau Gwent	11,869	5,366	68.8%	31.2%	32.4%
Bridgend	25,063	11,736	68.2%	31.8%	35.6%
Caerphilly	28,431	15,731	64.4%	35.6%	34.5%
Cardiff	53,437	33,606	61.4%	38.6%	35.1%
Carmarthenshire	42,979	17,712	70.8%	29.2%	44.3%
Ceredigion	16,595	8,412	66.3%	33.7%	44.0%
Conwy	18,368	12,390	59.7%	40.3%	33.7%
Denbighshire	15,793	9,742	61.8%	38.2%	34.4%
Flintshire	21,119	12,913	62.1%	37.9%	29.4%
Gwynedd	28,200	8,891	76.0%	24.0%	43.3%
Merthyr Tydfil	9,136	4,132	68.8%	31.2%	30.1%
Monmouthshire	12,381	12,701	49.4%	50.6%	35.8%
Neath Port Talbot	29,957	11,057	73.0%	27.0%	38.0%
Newport	15,983	13,204	54.7%	45.3%	27.9%
Pembrokeshire	19,600	16,050	54.9%	45.1%	38.7%
Powys	21,072	19,730	51.6%	48.4%	39.6%
Rhondda Cynon Taf	43,051	17,834	70.7%	29.3%	34.6%
Swansea	38,496	22,409	63.3%	36.7%	32.9%
Torfaen	14,655	8,688	62.7%	37.2%	33.8%
Vale of Glamorgan	19,430	17,551	52.5%	47.5%	40.1%
Wrexham	17,606	9,863	64.1%	35.9%	27.0%

Turnout was highest in Carmarthenshire (44.36%) and lowest in Wrexham (27.04%). The highest percentage of Yes votes was in Gwynedd (76.03% Yes) and the highest percentage of No votes was in Monmouthshire (50.64% No).

== Reactions to the result ==
First Minister Carwyn Jones said: "Today an old nation came of age."

Deputy First Minister and Plaid Cymru leader Ieuan Wyn Jones said that it marked "the beginning of a new era of Welsh devolution - the decade to deliver for Wales. ... To demand respect, you must first display self-respect. Today we have done just that, and the rest of the world can now sit up and take notice of the fact that our small nation, here on the western edge of the continent of Europe, has demonstrated pride in who we are, and what we all stand for."

Kirsty Williams, leader of the Welsh Liberal Democrats, said that the referendum showed that people "wanted to endorse and strengthen devolution", but they "also want it to work better". She said that voters were right to show "widespread dissatisfaction" with the Welsh Government's performance.

Welsh Secretary Cheryl Gillan, a member of the Conservative Party, said that there had been concern over turnout, but called it "a good day for Wales". She said that the UK Government would reinforce its commitment to make the arrangements work effectively.

Roger Lewis, Chairman of the Yes for Wales campaign, said he was delighted, adding: "It is clear, the people of Wales have spoken."

Rachel Banner, of the No campaign, said that it marked a "turning point for our nation". She questioned the legitimacy of the result, asking: "Has it got the full-hearted consent of the Welsh people?" She also stated that she did not believe that the 42 backbench members of the Assembly could provide high-quality scrutiny of the activities of the Welsh Government.

== See also ==
- Yes for Wales
- Commission on Scottish Devolution
- Referendums in the United Kingdom
- Welsh devolution
