= Rachel Minto =

Rachel Minto is a Senior Lecturer in Politics at the School of Law and Politics and the Wales Governance Centre, Cardiff University. She is deputy director of the Wales Governance Centre. She is an expert in European politics and governance, with a particular focus on territorial politics between the EU and the UK post-Brexit, and gender equality. She has given evidence at the Scottish, Welsh and English Parliaments.

== Education ==
Minto received her PhD degree from the University of Bristol in 2012. Her doctoral thesis was Gender Maintreaming in the European Union’s Coordination on Immigrant Integration. She was awarded a BSc. in Physics from the University of Birmingham, and an M.A. in European Studies from the University of Birmingham. She also holds an M.Sc. in Social Science Research Methods from the University of Bristol.

== Career and research ==
Minto's research has focused on Wales and Brexit, devolution, net-zero policy, and gender in the EU. With Alison Parken and Leah Hibbs, Minto conducted a review of inclusive policies at the Senedd in 2026. The review was commissioned by the Senedd's Family Friendly and Inclusive Parliament Review Board and chaired by Joyce Watson MS.

Minto gave evidence to the Constitution, Europe, External Affairs and Culture Committee at the Scottish Parliament in 2025, and to the Scottish Affairs Committee at the House of Commons in 2023. She is a board member for the Wales Women's Budget Group, and has previously chaired Cardiff Women's Aid. In 2023, she co-authored the report ‘An equal and just transition to Net Zero’. She contributes to various media platforms including the BBC and The Conversation.

== Select bibliography ==
- Minto, Rachel, Carolyn Rowe, and Elin Royles, 'The Dynamics of De-Europeanisation in a Multilevel Context: Resistance and Power Politics in Scotland and Wales', Journal of Common Market Studies, 2025
- Copeland, P., and Minto, R., 'Structuring women's interest representation in Europe: between Europeanisation, de-Europeanisation and regionalisation in the UK', European Journal of Politics and Gender (10.1332/25151088Y2026D000000133) 2026
- MacBride-Stewart, S., et al. 2026. 'Eco-equalities for a Just Transition to Net Zero: Applying an equality mainstreaming framework', Energy Research & Social Science 131
- Minto, R., and R. Wyn Jones, 'UK intergovernmental relations: on state-form, sovereignty and Brexit', Territory, Politics, Governance 2025
- Minto, R., Rowe, C. and Royles, E., 'Sub-states in transition: Changing patterns of EU paradiplomacy in Scotland and Wales, 1992-2021', Antunes, S. et al., Between cooperation and conflict: Strategies of regional mobilization towards the EU (Abingdon: Routledge, 2025)
- R. Minto and L. Mergaert, 'Gender mainstreaming and evaluation in the EU: comparative perspectives from feminist institutionalism', International Feminist Journal of Politics 20 (2) 2018, 204–220
- J. Hunt and R. Minto, 'Between intergovernmental relations and paradiplomacy: Wales and the Brexit of the regions', The British Journal of Politics and International Relations 19 (4), 647–62
- R. Minto, J. Hunt, M. Keating, and L. McGowan, 'A changing UK in a changing Europe: The UK state between European Union and devolution', The Political Quarterly 87 (2), 2016, 179–186
