= Richard Commission =

2002 government commission in Wales

The Commission on the Powers and Electoral Arrangements of the National Assembly for Wales, known unofficially as The Richard Commission, was established in July 2002 by the First Minister of the National Assembly for Wales, now known as the Senedd. Ivor Richard, Baron Richard was appointed to chair the Commission. Richard was joined by five Commissioners appointed following open competition and interview, as well as four commissioners nominated jointly by the four party leaders in the first Assembly.

The purpose of the Commission was examine the powers and electoral arrangements of the National Assembly and to remit its findings in an independent report. The report was intended to contribute to decisions on the future of the National Assembly and the way Wales was to be governed.

The Commission published its report in March 2004. It recommended that the National Assembly should have powers to legislate in certain areas, whilst others would remain the preserve of Westminster. It also recommended changing the electoral system to the single transferable vote (STV) which would produce greater proportionality.

The Commission did not evaluate the performance of the Assembly or the Welsh Assembly Government. The Commission viewed that would have involved going outside the terms of reference and making subjective judgments.

In response, the British government, in its Better Governance for Wales White Paper, published on 15 June 2005, proposed a more permissive law-making system for the Welsh Assembly based on the use of Parliamentary Orders in Council. In so doing, the Government rejected many of the cross party Richard Commission's recommendations. This has attracted criticism from opposition parties and others.

== Commission's membership ==
- Ivor Richard, Baron Richard, previously Leader of the House of Lords, EEC Commissioner, Member of Parliament and UK Ambassador to the United Nations.
- Tom Jones, farmer from Welshpool, Powys. Chair of Wales Council for Voluntary Action, member of the Countryside Council for Wales and Chair of the Millennium Stadium Charitable Trust.
- Peter Price, former member of European parliament. Member of National Assembly Standing Orders Commission. Solicitor, part-time Chairman of Employment Tribunal. Lives in Cardiff.
- Ted Rowlands, Former MP for Merthyr Tydfil and Rhymney and Cardiff North, Welsh Office Minister and Minister at the Foreign Office. Lives in Carmarthenshire.
- Huw Thomas, from Colwyn Bay. Director of Taro Consultancy Ltd, and former Chief Executive of Denbighshire County Council. RNID Trustee for Wales, Lay Member of Law Society Council and consumer member of Hearing Aid Council.
- Sir Michael Wheeler-Booth KCB, retired Clerk of the Parliaments at Westminster. Member of the Royal Commission on House of Lords Reform and of National Assembly Standing Orders Commission. Special lecturer Magdalen College Oxford.
- Eira Davies, from Wrexham, Managing Director of a web publishing business. Member of the board of S4C and of Coleg Llandrillo Cymru.
- Dr Laura McAllister, Senior Lecturer in Public Administration and Politics, School of Management, University of Liverpool. From Bridgend, lives in Liverpool.
- Vivienne Sugar, Local Government Consultant, former Chief Executive of the City and County of Swansea. Lives in Swansea.
- Paul Valerio, First Lord Mayor of Swansea in 1982. Councillor, City of Swansea. Retired from family business in the amusement industry. Lives in the Gower.

== Commission's recommendations ==
- There should be a legislative Assembly for Wales on the model in Chapter 13 of the report;
- In the interim, the framework delegated powers approach should be expanded as far as possible with the agreements of the UK Government and Parliament;
- If a legislative Assembly is constituted, tax-varying powers are desirable but not essential;
- To exercise primary powers, the Assembly need an increase in membership to 80 Members;
- The Assembly should be reconstituted as a separate legislature and executive;
- The present voting system cannot sustain an increase to 80, and the best alternative is the STV system;
- These changes should be in place by 2011, or sooner if practicable.
