= Senedd and Elections (Wales) Act 2020 =

Act of Senedd Cymru

Senedd and Elections (Wales) Act 2020 (Note: Section 43.)
- Act of the National Assembly for Wales
- National Assembly for Wales
- Long title: An Act of the National Assembly for Wales to rename the National Assembly for Wales, to extend the right to vote in Senedd elections, to amend the law relating to disqualification from membership of the Senedd, to make provision regarding oversight of the work of the Electoral Commission, to make miscellaneous changes to the law relating to the government of Wales and for related purposes.
- Citation: 2020 anaw 1
- Introduced by: Elin Jones AM
- Territorial extent: Wales

Dates
- Royal assent: 15 January 2020
- Commencement: 15 January 2020 (most sections); 1 June 2020 for the expansion of the franchise in any elections; 6 May 2020 for the new name Senedd Cymru or Welsh Parliament; 5 April 2021 for rules disqualifying holders of other offices from becoming members of the Senedd; (Note: Section 42.)

Other legislation
- Amends: Representation of the People Act 1983; Political Parties, Elections and Referendums Act 2000; Government of Wales Act 2006
- Amended by: Local Government and Elections (Wales) Act 2021; Senedd Cymru (Representation of the People) Order 2025

Status: Amended

History of passage through the Assembly

Text of statute as originally enacted

Revised text of statute as amended

Text of the Senedd and Elections (Wales) Act 2020 as in force today (including any amendments) within the United Kingdom, from legislation.gov.uk.

The Senedd and Elections (Wales) Act 2020 (anaw 1) (Welsh: Deddf Senedd ac Etholiadau (Cymru) 2020) is an Act of the National Assembly for Wales that was given royal assent on 15 January 2020. It was first detailed in February 2019 by way of an Explanatory Memorandum.

== Summary ==
The act allowed for the first time in Wales afford 16 and 17 year olds the right to vote, beginning with the 2021 Senedd election. The decision is the largest franchise extension in Wales since 1969, when the Representation of the People Act 1969 reduced the voting age from 21 to 18. The franchise will also be extended to "eligible foreign nationals".

The act also changed the name of the legislature to "Senedd Cymru" or "the Welsh Parliament". The decision was controversial and saw much debate in the chamber between those who favoured the single name Senedd and those (led by former First Minister Carwyn Jones) who sought to include a bilingual element. Guidance issued following the passage of the act suggests that the institution is to be commonly known as the 'Senedd' in both English and Welsh.

The act amended section 16 of the Government of Wales Act 2006 so that some disqualified individuals prohibited from taking up a seat in the Senedd are, and some are not, also prohibited from standing for election; and ensures that the Electoral Commission is funded by and accountable to the Senedd for Welsh elections.

The bill was agreed by the Assembly on 27 November 2019. It became an act following royal assent on 15 January 2020. The contents of the act were implemented in May 2020.
