= Ministerial order =

Decree made by a ministry

A ministerial decree or ministerial order is a decree by a ministry. With a ministerial decree the administrative department is delegated the task to impose a formal judgement or mandate. Ministerial decrees are usually imposed under the authority of the department's chief minister, secretary or administrator.

== Belgium ==
In Belgium, a ministerial decree (Dutch: ministerieel besluit, French: arrêté ministériel) is a decision of a minister of the federal government. The Belgian Constitution stipulates that the King of Belgium, in practice the federal government as a whole, is responsible for the execution of laws adopted by the federal parliament. This is done by royal order. For more detailed measures, the minister responsible can act alone by ministerial order. Ministerial orders must be published in the Belgian Official Journal before they can enter into force.

== Canada ==
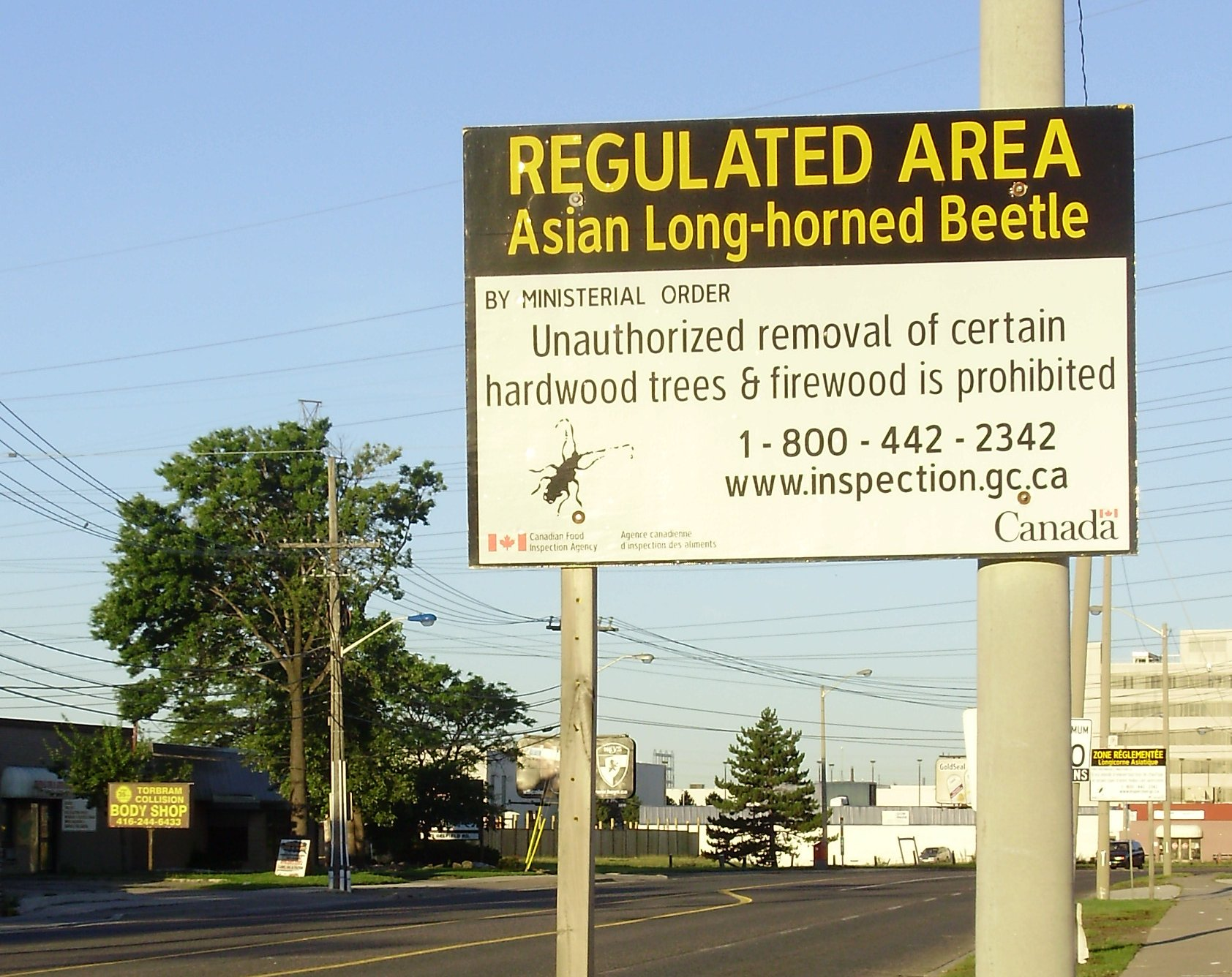
A sign from the Canadian Food Inspection Agency advising residents of a ministerial order in effect for the area. A similar sign in French may be seen in the background of the photo.

In Canada, a ministerial order (French: arrêté ministériel) is a decision made by a Minister of the Crown, that does not necessitate the approval of the Cabinet, or the Lieutenant Governor in Council/Governor General of Canada. The operations surrounding ministerial orders differs between the federal government and the governments of the provinces of Canada. For instance, in Alberta, ministerial orders are not automatically made public.

== Spain ==
In Spain, a ministerial decree (Spanish: orden ministerial) is a regulation issued by any of the government ministries. In the legal hierarchy, it sits below a Real Decreto del Presidente del Gobierno (Royal Decree of the Prime Minister) and a Real Decreto del Consejo de Ministros (Royal Decree of the Council of Ministers). Ministerial decrees are produced not only by ministers in affairs relating to their own departments, but also by delegate commissions formed to deal with matters that affect several ministries.

== United Kingdom ==
In the United Kingdom a ministerial decree is known as a "ministerial order." Until 2013 there was only one example, the Competition and Service (Utilities) Act 1992 (Commencement No. 1) Order 1992.

The order was made under powers contained in section 56(2) of the Competition and Service (Utilities) Act 1992, which allowed the Secretary of State to provide for the commencement of the act "by order". However, presumably due to an oversight in the drafting process, the act did not provide for such an order to be made by statutory instrument as defined by the Statutory Instruments Act 1946. No other commencement orders have been made under the relevant powers, and until 2013 this remained the only "ministerial order" in existence.

In 2013 the ministerial order became a more common type of legislation, as it was used 27 times that year, under the Marine and Coastal Access Act 2009; such continued in 2016. In 2015, the Sewerage Undertakers (Information) (Revocation) Direction 2015 was given under section 202 of the Water Industry Act 1991.

They are distinct from ministerial directions, which are formal directions to proceed requested by civil servants should a spending proposal fail to meet the criteria for appropriate public spending.
