= Government of Wales Act 2006 =

Act of the Parliament of the United Kingdom

Government of Wales Act 2006 (Note: Section 166.)
- Act of Parliament
- Parliament of the United Kingdom
- Long title: An Act to make provision about the government of Wales.
- Citation: 2006 c. 32
- Introduced by: Peter Hain MP (Commons); Lord Evans of Temple Guiting (Lords)
- Territorial extent: United Kingdom (Note: Section 165.)

Dates
- Royal assent: 25 July 2006
- Commencement: Various (Note: Section 161.)
Other legislation
Amends	Statutory Instruments Act 1946; Laying of Documents before Parliament (Interpretation) Act 1948; Defamation Act (Northern Ireland) 1955; Public Records Act 1958; Parliamentary Commissioner Act 1967; Pensions (Increase) Act 1971; Local Government Act 1974; Interpretation Act 1978; Local Government, Planning and Land Act 1980; Mental Health Act 1983; National Audit Act 1983; Insolvency Act 1986; Public Order Act 1986; Finance Act 1987; Local Government Finance Act 1988; Copyright, Designs and Patents Act 1988; Official Secrets Act 1989; Town and Country Planning Act 1990; Planning (Listed Buildings and Conservation Areas) Act 1990; Planning (Hazardous Substances) Act 1990; Tribunals and Inquiries Act 1992; Value Added Tax Act 1994; Defamation Act 1996; Government of Wales Act 1998; Human Rights Act 1998; Northern Ireland Act 1998; Pollution Prevention and Control Act 1999; Care Standards Act 2000; Government Resources and Accounts Act 2000; Learning and Skills Act 2000; Political Parties, Elections and Referendums Act 2000; House of Commons (Removal of Clergy Disqualification) Act 2001; European Parliamentary Elections Act 2002; Justice (Northern Ireland) Act 2002; Health (Wales) Act 2003; Local Government Act 2003; Criminal Justice Act 2003; Copyright and Related Rights Regulations 2003; Planning and Compulsory Purchase Act 2004; Public Audit (Wales) Act 2004; Local Authorities (Capital Finance) (Consequential, Transitional and Saving Provisions) Order 2004; Companies Act 1985 (Inter—national Accounting Standards and Other Accounting Amendments) Regulations 2004; Constitutional Reform Act 2005; Public Services Ombudsman (Wales) Act 2005; Inquiries Act 2005
Amended by	National Health Service (Consequential Provisions) Act 2006; Further Education and Training Act 2007; Local Government and Public Involvement in Health Act 2007; Mental Health Act 2007; Government of Wales Act 2006 (Consequential Modifications and Transitional Provisions) Order 2007; National Assembly for Wales (Transfer of staff to Assembly Commission Scheme) Order 2007; National Assembly for Wales (Legislative Competence) (Conversion of Framework Powers) Order 2007; Education and Skills Act 2008; Local Transport Act 2008; Planning Act 2008; Companies Act 2006 (Consequential Amendments etc) Order 2008; National Assembly for Wales (Legislative Competence) (Social Welfare and Other Fields) Order 2008; Local Democracy, Economic Development and Construction Act 2009; Marine and Coastal Access Act 2009; Learning and Skills (Wales) Measure 2009; Companies Act 2006 (Consequential Amendments, Transitional Provisions and Savings) Order 2009; Welsh Ministers (Transfer of Functions) ( No. 2) Order 2009; National Assembly for Wales (Legislative Competence) (Agriculture and Rural Development) Order 2009; National Assembly for Wales (Legislative Competence) (Exceptions to Matters) Order 2009; National Assembly for Wales (Legislative Competence) (Social Welfare) Order 2009; Constitutional Reform and Governance Act 2010; Bribery Act 2010; National Assembly for Wales (Remuneration) Measure 2010; Local Education Authorities and Children’s Services Authorities (Integration of Functions) Order 2010; National Assembly for Wales (Legislative Competence) (Culture and Other Fields) Order 2010; National Assembly for Wales (Legislative Competence) (Education) Order 2010; National Assembly for Wales (Legislative Competence) (Environment) Order 2010; National Assembly for Wales (Legislative Competence) (Health and Health Services and Social Welfare) Order 2010; National Assembly for Wales (Legislative Competence) (Housing and Local Government) Order 2010; National Assembly for Wales (Legislative Competence) (Local Government) Order 2010; National Assembly for Wales (Legislative Competence) (Transport) Order 2010; National Assembly for Wales (Legislative Competence) (Welsh Language) Order 2010; Welsh Zone (Boundaries and Transfer of Functions) Order 2010; Parliamentary Voting System and Constituencies Act 2011; Police Reform and Social Responsibility Act 2011; Budget Responsibility and National Audit Act 2011; Treaty of Lisbon (Changes in Terminology) Order 2011; Waste (England and Wales) Regulations 2011; Welsh Language (Wales) Measure 2011; Government of Wales Act 2006 (Commencement of Assembly Act Provisions, Transitional and Saving Provisions and Modifications) Order 2011; National Assembly for Wales (Official Languages) Act 2012; Public Audit (Wales) Act 2013; Natural Resources Body for Wales (Functions) Order 2013; Wales Act 2014; Qualifications Wales Act 2015; Higher Education (Wales) Act 2015; Planning (Wales) Act 2015; Well-being of Future Generations (Wales) Act 2015; Transfer of Functions (Information and Public Records) Order 2015; Welsh Language (Wales) Measure 2011 (Consequential Provisions) Order 2016; Environment (Wales) Act 2016; Tax Collection and Management (Wales) Act 2016; Wales Act 2017; Higher Education and Research Act 2017; European Union (Withdrawal) Act 2018; Package Travel and Linked Travel Arrangements Regulations 2018; Welsh Ministers (Transfer of Functions) Order 2018; Welsh Ministers (Transfer of Functions) (Railways) Order 2018; Public Services Ombudsman (Wales) Act 2019; Legislation (Wales) Act 2019; Government of Wales Act 2006 (Amendment) Order 2019; European Union (Withdrawal Agreement) Act 2020; Sentencing Act 2020; United Kingdom Internal Market Act 2020; Fisheries Act 2020; European Union (Future Relationship) Act 2020; Senedd and Elections (Wales) Act 2020; Health and Social Care (Quality and Engagement) (Wales) Act 2020; Environment Act 2021; Domestic Abuse Act 2021; Local Government and Elections (Wales) Act 2021; Government of Wales Act 2006 (Amendment) Order 2021; Dissolution and Calling of Parliament Act 2022; Commercial Rent (Coronavirus) Act 2022; Professional Qualifications Act 2022; Elections Act 2022; Tertiary Education and Research (Wales) Act 2022; European Union (Withdrawal) Act 2018 (Repeal of EU Restrictions in Devolution Legislation, etc.) Regulations 2022; Trade (Australia and New Zealand) Act 2023; Procurement Act 2023; Levelling-up and Regeneration Act 2023; Historic Environment (Wales) Act 2023; Government of Wales Act 2006 (Schedule 9A – Devolved Welsh Authorities) (Amendment) Order 2023; Animal Welfare (Livestock Exports) Act 2024; Elections and Elected Bodies (Wales) Act 2024; Government of Wales Act 2006 (Devolved Welsh Authorities) (Amendment) Order 2024; Data (Use and Access) Act 2025; Absent Voting (Elections in Scotland and Wales) Act 2025; Product Regulation and Metrology Act 2025; Legislation (Procedure, Publication and Repeals) (Wales) Act 2025; Government of Wales Act 2006 (Devolved Welsh Authorities) (Amendment) Order 2025
Relates to	Welsh Elections (Coronavirus) Act 2021

Status: Amended

History of passage through Parliament

Text of statute as originally enacted

Revised text of statute as amended

The Government of Wales Act 2006 (c. 32) is an act of the Parliament of the United Kingdom that reformed the then-National Assembly for Wales (now the Senedd) and allows further powers to be granted to it more easily. The act creates a system of government with a separate executive drawn from and accountable to the legislature. It is part of a series of laws legislating for Welsh devolution.

== Background ==
The legislation came about because of proposals from the Richard Commission, which were supported in a special party conference in 2004.

The specific details of the legislation were negotiated by First Minister Rhodri Morgan and Secretary of State for Wales Peter Hain.

== Provisions ==
The act has the following provisions:

- creates an executive body—the Welsh Assembly Government (known since May 2011 as the Welsh Government)—that is separate from the legislative body, that is, the National Assembly for Wales. The Welsh Government is therefore altered from being a committee of the National Assembly to being a distinct body
- forbids candidates both contesting constituencies and being on a regional list
- provides a mechanism for Orders in Council to delegate power from Parliament to the Assembly, which will give the Assembly powers to make "Measures" (Welsh Laws). Schedule 5 of the Act describes the fields in which the assembly has Measure making powers.
- provides for a referendum for further legislature competencies, to be known as "Acts of the Assembly", expanding the Assembly's legislative competence
- creates a Welsh Seal and a Keeper of the Welsh Seal (the First Minister)
- creates a Welsh Consolidated Fund
- creates the post of Counsel General as a member of the Welsh Government and its chief legal adviser.
- creates a Partnership Council for Wales to facilitate co-operation between Welsh ministers and local government in Wales.
- assigns to the monarch new functions of formally appointing Welsh ministers and granting royal assent to acts of the Assembly.

The bill received royal assent on 25 July 2006.

The part that provides for acts was brought into force, and the relating to measures and related Orders in Council ceased to have effect, on 5 May 2011 following the 2011 Welsh devolution referendum. The act was further amended to rename the assembly to Senedd Cymru, and further extend its legislative competence to the reserved matters model, by the Wales Act 2014.

== Schedule 5 of the act ==
Schedule 5 of the act describes the 20 "fields" and "matters" in which the National Assembly for Wales had legislative competence, i.e. the ability to pass Assembly Measures. A field is a broad subject area, such as education and training, the environment, health and health services, highways and transport, or housing. A matter is a specific defined policy area within a field.

The assembly could gain further legislative competence by the amendment of schedule 5. There were two ways in which this can happen: either as a result of clauses included in legislation passed by an act of Parliament at Westminster, or by Legislative Competence Orders (LCOs) granted by Parliament in response to a request from the National Assembly itself (LCOs could be proposed by the Welsh Government, or by individual members, or by assembly committees, but had to be approved by the National Assembly before they could go forward). The result of either method was to amend any of the 20 fields by inserting specific matters. The assembly then had competence to pass legislation on those matters.

Schedule 5 was regularly updated as result of these two processes.

Schedule 5 became moot when the assembly gained the competence to pass acts, which were restricted to matters listed in schedule 7 rather than schedule 5, and lost the competence to pass measures.

=== Fields of schedule 5 ===
- Field 1: agriculture, fisheries, forestry and rural development
- Field 2: ancient monuments and historic buildings
- Field 3: culture
- Field 4: economic development
- Field 5: education and training
- Field 6: environment
- Field 7: fire and rescue services and promotion of fire safety
- Field 8: food
- Field 9: health and health services
- Field 10: highways and transport
- Field 11: housing
- Field 12: local government
- Field 13: National Assembly for Wales
- Field 14: public administration
- Field 15: social welfare
- Field 16: sport and recreation
- Field 17: tourism
- Field 18: town and country planning
- Field 19: water and flood defence
- Field 20: Welsh language

== Criticism ==
The Government of Wales Act 2006 was criticised by Plaid Cymru for not delivering a fully-fledged parliament.

== See also ==
- Welsh devolution
- Government of Wales Act 1998
- Wales Act 2014
- Wales Act 2017
- Welsh law
