= Senedd =

Devolved parliament of Wales

Coordinates: 51°27′49″N 3°9′45″W

Welsh Parliament Senedd Cymru
- 7th Senedd

Type
- Type: Unicameral
- Term limits: None

History
- Founded: 12 May 1999
- Preceded by: Welsh Office (1965–1999)
- New session started: 9 May 2026

Leadership
- Monarch: Charles III since 8 September 2022
- Llywydd: Huw Irranca-Davies, Labour since 12 May 2026
- Deputy Presiding Officer: Kerry Ferguson, Plaid Cymru since 12 May 2026
- First Minister: Rhun ap Iorwerth, Plaid Cymru since 12 May 2026
- Leader of the Opposition: Helen Jenner, Reform since 21 September 2026

Structure
- Seats: 96
- Graph of the party split among 96 seats.
- Political groups: Government (44): Plaid Cymru (44); Opposition (52): Reform (33); Labour (9) (Note: Includes 4 MSs sponsored by the Co-operative Party, who are designated Labour and Co-operative.); Conservative (7); Green (2); Liberal Democrats (1)
- Committees: 16: Business Committee; Early Years, Children, Young People and Education; Constitution, Justice and External Affairs; Climate Change, Environment, Sustainability and Rural Affairs; Culture, Communications, Cymraeg and Sport; Economy, Energy and Connectivity; Equality, Human Rights and Social Justice; Finance; Health and Social Care; Legislation; Local Government, Housing and Planning; Llywydd’s Committee; Petitions; Public Accounts and Public Administration; Standards of Conduct; Whole Senedd
- Authority: Government of Wales Act 2006 (as amended by Wales Act 2017)
- Salary: Basic: £76,380 per year, plus expenses

Elections
- Voting system: Party-list proportional representation (closed list, D'Hondt method)
- First election: 6 May 1999
- Last election: 7 May 2026
- Next election: On or before 2 May 2030
- Redistricting: Recommendations made by Democracy and Boundary Commission Cymru; confirmed by the Welsh Government

Meeting place
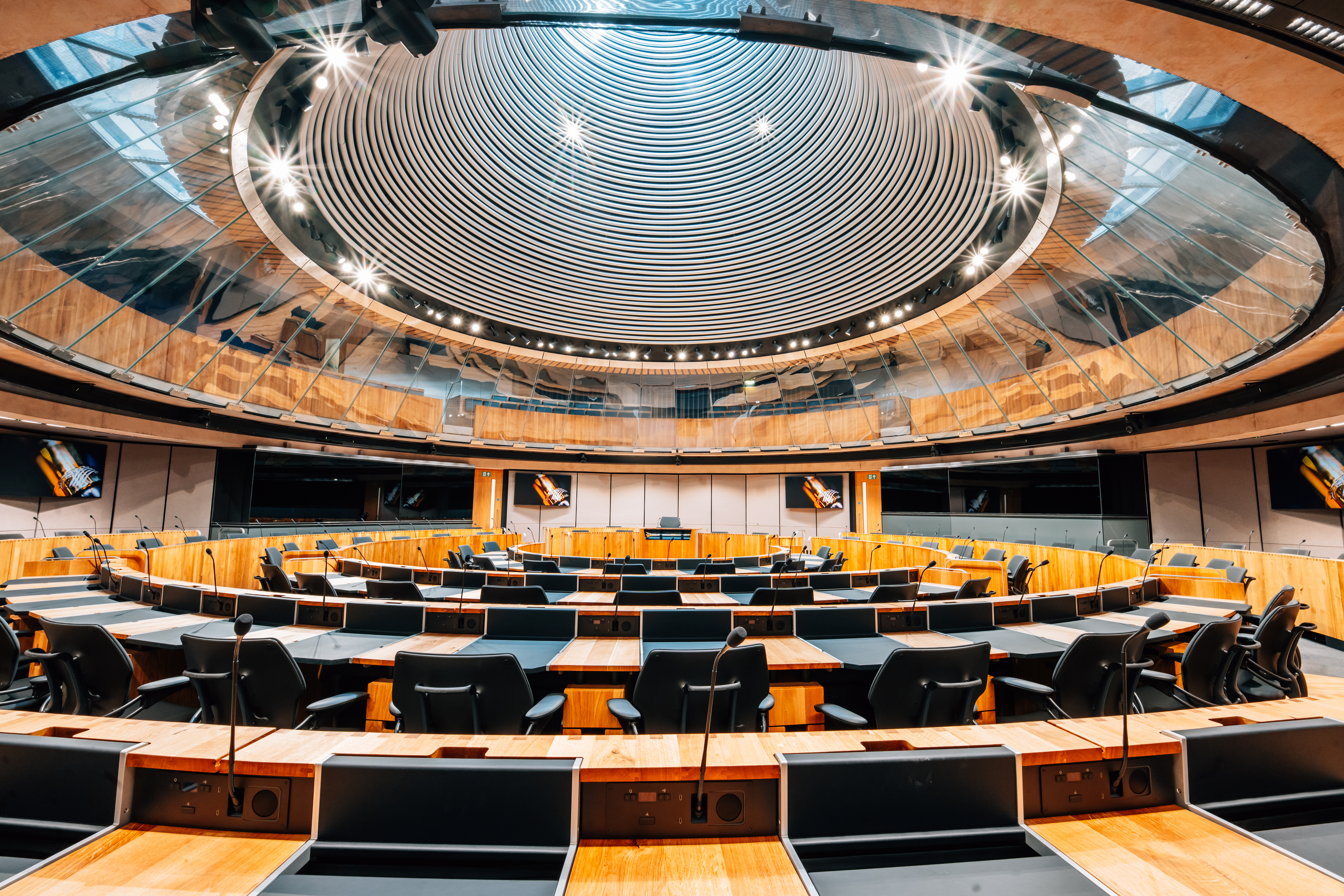
- Siambr (debating chamber) in the Senedd building, Cardiff, Wales, in 2026

Website
- senedd.wales

Rules
- Standing Orders of the Welsh Parliament (April 2026)

The Senedd (/ˈsɛnɛð/ SEN-edh; lit. 'parliament' or 'senate'), officially known as the Welsh Parliament in English and Senedd Cymru ([ˈsɛnɛð ˈkəmrɨ]) in Welsh, is the devolved, unicameral legislature of Wales. A democratically elected body, its role is to scrutinise the Welsh Government and legislate on devolved matters that are not reserved to the Parliament of the United Kingdom. It is a bilingual institution, with both Welsh and English being the official languages of its business. From its creation in May 1999 until May 2020, the Senedd was officially known as the National Assembly for Wales (Cynulliad Cenedlaethol Cymru) and was often simply called the Welsh Assembly.

The Senedd comprises 96 members who are known as members of the Senedd (Aelodau o'r Senedd), abbreviated as "MS" (Welsh: AS). Between 2011 and 2026, members were elected for a five-year term of office under the additional-member system, in which 40 MSs represented smaller geographical divisions known as "constituencies" and were elected by first-past-the-post voting, and 20 MSs represented five "electoral regions" using the D'Hondt method of proportional representation. Since May 2026, elections use closed list proportional representation, and Senedd terms last for four years. Typically, the largest party in the Senedd forms the Welsh Government.

A National Assembly for Wales was created by the Government of Wales Act 1998, following the result of the 1997 referendum. The Assembly initially had no powers to make primary legislation. Limited law-making powers were gained through the Government of Wales Act 2006. Its primary law-making powers were enhanced following a Yes vote in the referendum on 3 March 2011, meaning that the UK Parliament or the Secretary of State for Wales were no longer consulted when passing acts of the National Assembly for Wales related to the 20 devolved areas. These powers were further extended by the Wales Act 2014 and Wales Act 2017, with the latter moving the Assembly to a reserved powers model of devolution like that of the Scottish Parliament. In May 2020, the Assembly was renamed to "Senedd Cymru" or "Welsh Parliament" when section 2 of the Senedd and Elections (Wales) Act 2020 came into force. The Senedd's powers in economic matters are significantly restricted by the UK Internal Market Act 2020, a primary purpose of which is to constrain the capacity of the devolved institutions to use their regulatory autonomy. Matters devolved to the Senedd include health, education, economic development, transport, the environment, agriculture, local government and some taxes.

== History ==
=== Road to devolution ===
Political movements supporting Welsh self-rule began in the late nineteenth century alongside a rise in Welsh nationalism. The Sunday Closing (Wales) Act 1881 was the first piece of legislation to acknowledge Wales as a separate politico-legal nation from England since the Acts of Union 1535 and 1542. The late 19th century saw the formation of a number of national institutions; a national and annual cultural event, the National Eisteddfod of Wales in 1861, the Football Association of Wales in 1876, the Welsh Rugby Union in 1881 and the University of Wales in 1893.

In 1896, education in Wales began to become distinct with the formation of the Central Welsh Board which inspected grammar schools in Wales and The Welsh Intermediate Education Act 1889 was brought about to "make further provision for the intermediate and technical education of the inhabitants of Wales and the county of Monmouth", making the board responsible for inspection of secondary schools. In 1907, the Welsh department of the Board of Education was formed and in the same year, a Welsh Inspectorate was established for inspection of elementary schools in Wales.

The early 20th century also saw the continued formation of a number of Welsh national institutions; the National Library of Wales in 1911, the Welsh Guards in 1915 and the Welsh Board of Health in 1919. The Church in Wales came into existence in 1920 following the disestablishment of the Church of England via the Welsh Church Act 1914.

An appointed Council for Wales and Monmouthshire was established in 1949 to "ensure the government is adequately informed of the impact of government activities on the general life of the people of Wales". The council had 27 members nominated by local authorities in Wales, the University of Wales, National Eisteddfod Council and the Welsh Tourist Board. A post of Minister of Welsh Affairs was created in 1951 and the post of Secretary of State for Wales and the Welsh Office were established in 1964 leading to the abolition of the Council for Wales. The establishment of the Welsh Office effectively created the basis for the territorial governance of Wales. The Royal Commission on the Constitution (the Kilbrandon Commission) was set up in 1969 by Harold Wilson's Labour Government to investigate the possibility of devolution for Scotland and Wales. Its recommendations formed the basis of the 1974 White paper Democracy and Devolution: proposals for Scotland and Wales, which proposed the creation of a Welsh Assembly. However, Welsh voters overwhelmingly rejected the proposals in a referendum held in 1979.

Following the 1997 general election, the new Labour Government argued that an Assembly would be more democratically accountable than the Welsh Office. For eleven years prior to 1997 Wales had been represented in the Cabinet of the United Kingdom by a Secretary of State who did not represent a Welsh constituency at Westminster. A referendum was held in Wales on 18 September 1997 in which voters approved the creation of the National Assembly for Wales with a total of 559,419 votes, or 50.3% of the vote.

In the following year, the Government of Wales Act was passed by the United Kingdom parliament, establishing the Assembly. On 1 July 1999, the powers of the Secretary of State for Wales were transferred to the Assembly, and the Welsh Office ceased to exist.

In July 2002, the Welsh Government established an independent commission, with Lord Richard (former leader of the House of Lords) as chair, to review the powers and electoral arrangements of the National Assembly to ensure that it is able to operate in the best interests of the people of Wales. The Richard Commission reported in March 2004. It recommended that the National Assembly should have powers to legislate in certain areas, whilst others would remain the preserve of Westminster. It also recommended changing the electoral system to the single transferable vote (STV) which would produce greater proportionality.

In response, the British government, in its Better Governance for Wales White Paper, published on 15 June 2005, proposed a more permissive law-making system for the Welsh Assembly based on the use of Parliamentary Orders in Council.

=== Enhanced powers: The Government of Wales Act 2006 ===
The Government of Wales Act 2006 received Royal assent on 25 July 2006. It conferred on the Assembly legislative powers similar to other devolved legislatures through the ability to pass Assembly Measures concerning matters that are devolved. Requests for further legislative powers made through legislative competence requests were subject to the veto of the Secretary of State for Wales, House of Commons or House of Lords.

The Act reformed the assembly to a parliamentary-type structure, establishing the Welsh Government as an entity separate from, but accountable to the National Assembly. It enables the Assembly to legislate within its devolved fields.

The Act also reforms the Assembly's electoral system. It prevents individuals from standing as candidates in both constituency and regional seats. It was supported in the Richard Commission.

The changes to the Assembly's powers were commenced on 4 May 2007, after the election.

Following a referendum on 3 March 2011, the Welsh Assembly gained direct law making powers, without the need to consult Westminster.

=== Reserved powers model: The Wales Act 2017 ===
The Conservative-Liberal coalition government created the Commission on Devolution in Wales (also known as Silk Commission), composed of members nominated by the 4 parties represented in the Welsh Assembly and several leading legal and political experts, to "create a lasting devolution settlement for Wales". Following the first set of recommendations by the Commission, the UK government announced in November 2013 that some borrowing powers are to be devolved to the Assembly along with control of landfill tax and stamp duty. Additionally the Wales Act 2014 provides for a referendum to be held on the Assembly's ability to set a degree of income tax, though there is a proposal for the requirement for a referendum to be removed.

Both the UK and Welsh governments supported the Silk Commission (Part 2) proposal to move to a "reserved powers" model of devolution (similar to that of the Scottish Parliament and the Northern Ireland Assembly) where the UK government would have specific "reserved" powers and the Welsh Assembly would have control of all other matters. This replaced the previous model where certain powers were "conferred" and all others were assumed to be powers of the UK national government. Since the passing of the Wales Act 2017, the power model in Wales has been in line with that of Scotland, being a reserved matter model.

The Wales Act 2017, based on the second set of recommendations of the Silk Commission, proposed devolving further areas of government, including some relating to water, marine affairs (ports, harbours, conservation), energy (subsidies, petroleum extraction, construction of smaller energy-generating facilities, etc.), rail franchising and road travel.

=== Name change ===
In July 2016, Assembly members unanimously agreed that the name of the Assembly should reflect its constitutional status as a national parliament. The Assembly Commission ran a public consultation on the proposal, which showed that 61% of respondents agreed or strongly agreed that the Assembly should change its name. In 2018, the commission announced its intention to introduce legislation to change the name of the Assembly. Later that year, the Llywydd – the Assembly's presiding officer – wrote to all Assembly Members explaining that the name change proposed in the Bill would be the monolingual name Senedd. In 2019, the Senedd and Elections (Wales) Bill, favouring the name Senedd, was introduced on behalf of the Assembly Commission. Following support of a subsequent amendment to the Bill which favoured a bilingual name for the institution, the Bill was passed by the Assembly on 27 November 2019 and was given Royal Assent on 15 January 2020. The Act changed the name of the Assembly to Senedd Cymru or the Welsh Parliament. Its guidance states that the institution will be commonly known as the Senedd in both languages. The name change came into effect on 6 May 2020. Members of the renamed body are known as Members of the Senedd (MS), or Aelodau o'r Senedd (AS) in Welsh.

=== Expansion ===
On 22 November 2021, Welsh Labour and Plaid Cymru agreed a co-operation deal that would see the implementation of 46 policies that the two parties shared. One of these was the expansion of the Senedd from 60 members to between 80 and 100 members.

At its conference on 12 March 2022, Welsh Labour unanimously approved increasing the size of the Senedd. "The expansion of the Senedd is essential because the journey of devolution is not yet complete", former First Minister Alun Michael said. "There is more to come. And the capacity needs to be there for those backbenchers to do the job of holding to account that you rightly said, cannot be done by to smaller number of representatives." Two weeks later, Plaid members backed the expansion proposal as well.

On 10 May 2022, plans to increase the number of MSs from 60 to 96 were unveiled, as well as the scrapping of first past the post, which, at the time, was used to elect 40 of the 60 Members of the Senedd (MSs). Drakeford said these changes were required as "report after report" had demonstrated that the Senedd in its current form "cannot do the job in the way that people in Wales have a right to expect it to be done". Welsh Lib Dem leader Jane Dodds criticised these plans, claiming that they would disproportionately impact smaller parties.

On 8 June 2022, the Senedd voted 40–14 in favour of expanding the number of MSs.

In 2023, the reform bill committee heard reforms included taking 32 new constituencies created that will be used in the 2024 general election and pairing them to create 16 Senedd constituencies – with each returning six members in multi-member districts. Opposition to the proposed closed list voting system was expressed by some Labour and Plaid Cymru representatives, while opposition to the overall expansion of the Senedd was expressed by some Labour representatives and the Conservatives.

== Powers and status ==
The Royal Badge of Wales appears on Acts of Senedd Cymru.

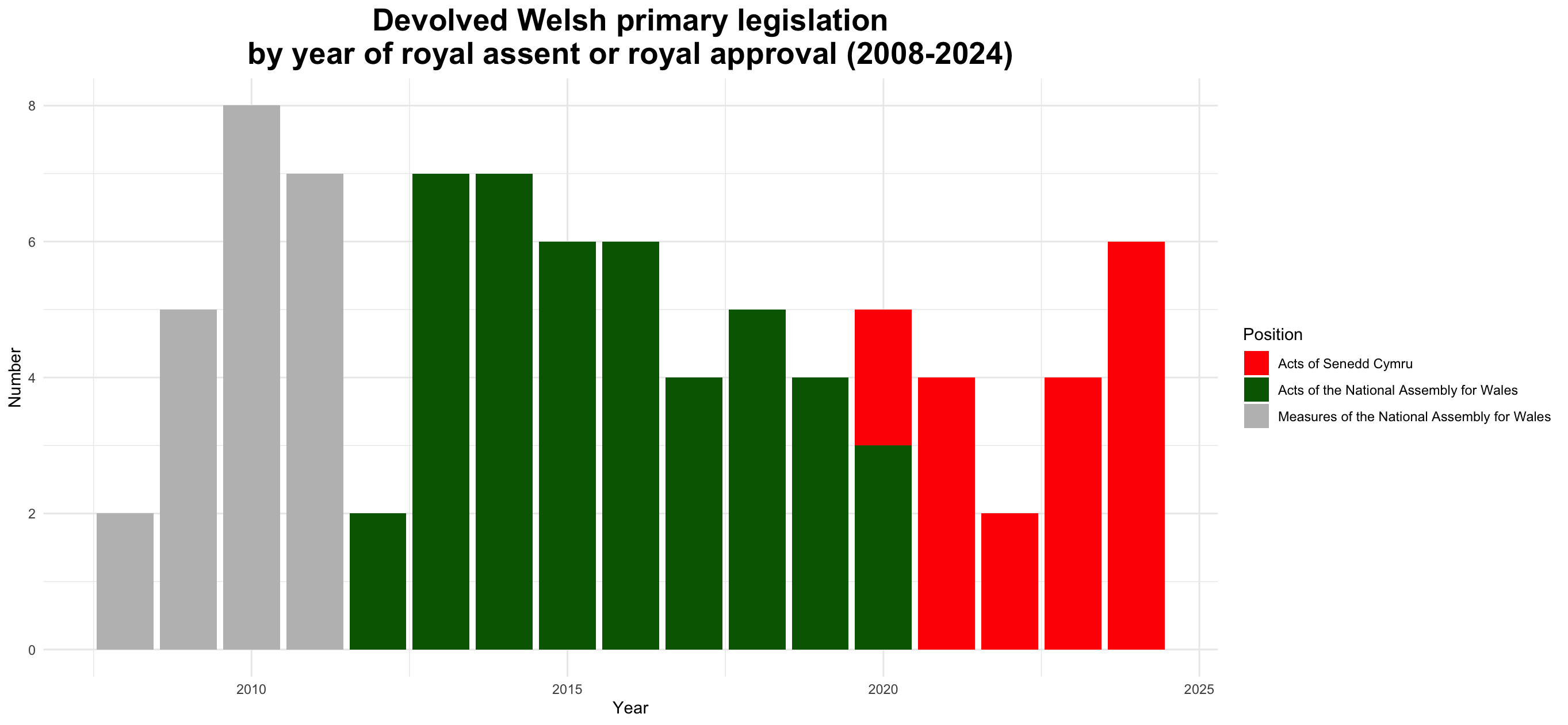
Bar chart/graph showing devolved Welsh primary legislation by year (2008–2024)

The Senedd consists of 96 elected members. They use the title Member of the Senedd (MS) or Aelod o'r Senedd (AS). The executive arm of the Senedd, the Welsh Government, had been a Labour administration since its inception in 1999 until 2026. Currently it is led by First Minister, Rhun ap Iorwerth, of Plaid Cymru since May 2026. The government between 2007 and 2011, had been a coalition between Labour, led by First Minister Carwyn Jones and Plaid Cymru, led by Deputy First Minister Ieuan Wyn Jones; and between 2016 and 2021, Labour had been in coalition with the Liberal Democrats and an independent member. From 2021 to early 2026, the government has been a Labour minority government. The executive and civil servants are mainly based in Cardiff's Cathays Park while the MSs, the Senedd Commission and Ministerial support staff are based in Cardiff Bay, where a new £67 million building, the Senedd, has been built. From May 2026, a minority Plaid Cymru government has been formed and works in the Senedd.

One important feature of the National Assembly until 2007 was that there was no legal or constitutional separation of the legislative and executive functions, since it was a single corporate entity. Compared with other parliamentary systems, and arrangements for devolution in other countries of the UK, this was unusual. In practice, however, there was separation of functions, and the terms "Assembly" and "Assembly Parliamentary Service" came into use to distinguish between the two arms. The Government of Wales Act 2006 regularised the separation when it came into effect following the 2007 Assembly Election.

Initially, the Assembly did not have primary legislative or fiscal powers, as these powers were reserved by Westminster. The Assembly did have powers to pass secondary legislation in devolved areas. Sometimes secondary legislation could be used to amend primary legislation, but the scope of this was very limited. For example, the first Government of Wales Act gave the Assembly power to amend primary legislation relating to the merger of certain public bodies. However, most secondary powers were conferred on the executive by primary legislation to give the executive (i.e. Ministers) more powers, and the Assembly had wider legislative powers than appearances might suggest. For example, the Assembly delayed local elections due to be held in 2003 for a year by use of secondary powers, so that they would not clash with Assembly elections. In 2001 the UK parliament used primary legislation to delay for one month local elections in England during the Foot-and-mouth disease epidemic.

The Assembly gained limited primary legislative powers following the 2007 election and the passage of the Government of Wales Act 2006. These laws are known as Assembly Measures and can be enacted in specific fields and matters within the legislative competency of the Assembly. New matters and fields can be devolved by Acts of the UK Parliament or by LCOs approved by Parliament.

Until 2015 the Assembly had no tax-varying powers, however it could influence the rate of Council Tax set by local authorities, which are part-funded by a grant from the Welsh government. It also has some discretion over charges for government services. Notable examples in which this discretion has been used to create significant differences from other areas in the UK are:

1. Charges for NHS prescriptions in Wales – these have now been abolished.
2. Charges for University Tuition – are different for Welsh resident students studying at Welsh Universities, compared with students from or studying elsewhere in the UK.
3. Charging for Residential Care – In Wales there is a flat rate of contribution towards the cost of nursing care (roughly comparable to the highest level of English Contribution) for those who require residential care.

This means in reality that there is a wider definition of "nursing care" than in England and therefore less dependence on means testing in Wales than in England, so that more people are entitled to higher levels of state assistance. These variations in the levels of charges may be viewed as de facto tax varying powers.

This model of more limited legislative powers created in 1999 was partly because Wales has had the same legal system as England since 1536 (though a different court system until 1830), when it was merged with England. Ireland and Scotland were never merged with England, and so always retained some differences in their legal systems. The Scottish Parliament and the Northern Ireland Assembly both have deeper and wider powers.

The Assembly inherited the powers and budget of the Secretary of State for Wales and most of the functions of the Welsh Office. It has power to vary laws passed by Westminster using secondary legislation.

Following a referendum on 4 March 2011, the Welsh Assembly gained direct law-making powers (without the need to consult Westminster). On 3 July 2012, the Welsh Assembly passed its first Act, the Local Government Byelaws (Wales) Act.

The Wales Act 2014 and Wales Act 2017 devolved the following taxes to the Welsh Assembly:

- Non-Domestic Rates in Wales – from 1 April 2015
- Land Transaction Tax (LTT) – from 1 April 2018
- Landfill Disposals Tax (LDT) – from 1 April 2018
- Welsh Rates of Income Tax (WRIT) – from 1 April 2019

=== Powers of the Senedd ===
The Senedd has the competence to pass bills for Acts of Senedd Cymru in all areas which are not explicitly reserved to Westminster; these 'reserved matters' are outlined in schedule 7A of the Government of Wales Act 2006.

This means the Senedd has powers over areas such as:

- Agriculture, fisheries, forestry and rural development
- Culture
- Economic development
- Education and training
- Environment
- Health and health services
- Highways and transport (not including rail infrastructure)
- Local government
- Tourism
- Welsh language

Reserved matters include subjects such as:

- Foreign affairs
- Immigration
- Police and justice
- Currency
- Most benefits
- Most taxes
- Defence

=== Constraints on powers and undermining of devolution ===
As part of the process of leaving the European Union, the Conservative Party in power in Westminster passed the United Kingdom Internal Market Act 2020. This legislation aims to prevent internal trade barriers within the UK, and to restrict the exercise of legislative powers of the devolved administrations in economic areas. It has several effects on the constitutional arrangements regarding devolved legislative powers. Principal amongst these is the effect that the market access principles will have on the practical ability of the devolved administrations to regulate economic activity. It also expressly reserves the regulation of distortive or harmful subsidies to the UK Government, and gives them spending powers in numerous policymaking areas.

These powers undermine the authority of the Senedd to determine infrastructure priorities within its jurisdiction. The principles undermine devolved competences in two ways. These relate to its status as a protected enactment, and to the disproportionate market size and power of the economy under English jurisdiction. Because the Senedd will be unable to disapply the market access principles, if they attempt to introduce new or stricter regulatory standards, they will only apply to goods produced within the devolved jurisdiction. This means that these standards will have little or no practical effect other than to disadvantage their own economy, severely restricting their ability to introduce regulatory divergence, or pursue different economic or social choices to those made in Westminster.

In 2025 the Labour government in Westminster started the Pride in Place scheme. Through this scheme the UK Government spent £180 million across nine Welsh areas in order to invest in public services, undermining the Welsh Government's devolved responsibility of local government. In response to this 11 Labour MSs wrote a letter to the UK Prime Minister Keir Starmer accusing the UK Government of "rolling back the existing devolution settlement".

== Members, constituencies, and electoral system ==
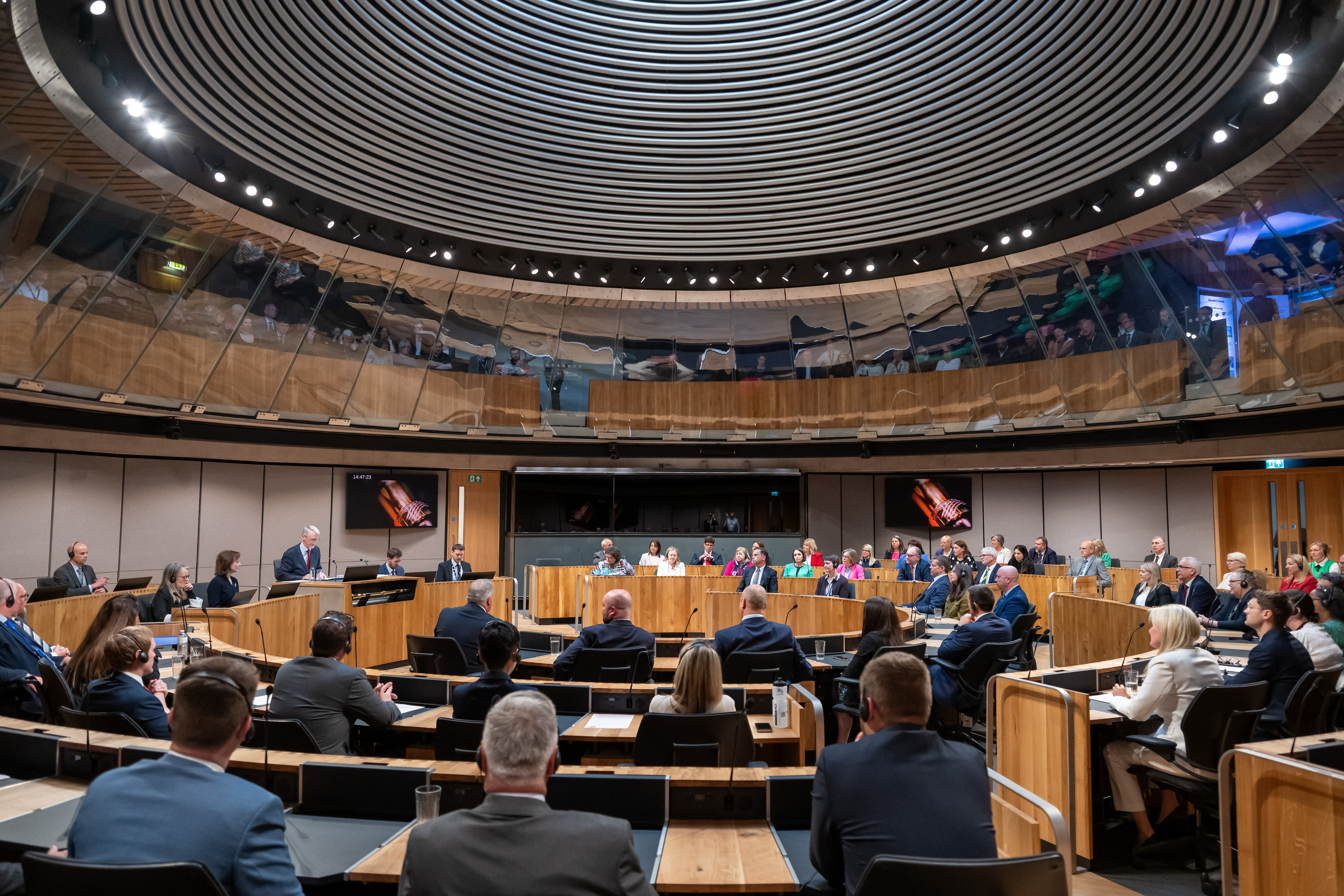
Members of the Senedd during a plenary session in the Siambr

Initially, the Senedd was elected under the Additional Member System, with forty MSs elected from single-member constituencies on a plurality voting system (or first past the post) basis, the constituencies being equivalent to those used for the House of Commons and twenty MSs elected from regional closed lists using an alternative party vote. There were five regions: Mid and West Wales, North Wales, South Wales Central, South Wales East and South Wales West (these are the same as the pre-1999 European Parliament constituencies for Wales), each of which returned four members. The additional members produced a degree of proportionality within each region. Voters could vote for any regional party list irrespective of their vote in the constituency election (splitting of the votes across party lists was permitted).

List MSs were not elected independently of the constituency result. Rather, elected constituency MSs were deemed to be pre-elected list representatives for the purposes of calculating remainders in the D'Hondt method.

Overall proportionality was limited by the small proportion of list members (they made up only 33% of the Senedd, compared with 43% in the Scottish Parliament, 50% in the New Zealand House of Representatives, and 53% in the German Bundestag), the regionalisation of the list element, and the lack of compensation for overhang seats, over-representation produced by the FPTP. Consequently, the Senedd as a whole had a greater degree of proportionality (based on proportions in the list elections) than the plurality voting system used for British parliamentary elections, but still deviated somewhat from full proportionality.

With the Senedd Cymru (members and elections) Act 2024, the voting system was changed to a closed list proportional representation system using the D’Hondt method with 6 seat constituencies, starting with the 2026 election. Each Senedd constituency is made up of two neighboring constituencies for the House of Commons.

In April 2020 the Senedd became the first legislature in the UK to meet over the internet. Due to the consequences of the COVID-19 pandemic, it held First Minister's Questions using Zoom videotelephony software and the session was subsequently broadcast by Senedd.tv.

== Composition ==
=== Government formation ===
Plaid Cymru have 44 out of 96 seats, 5 seats short of a majority. On 12 May 2026 Rhun ap Iorwerth, the leader of Plaid Cymru was sworn in as First Minister, on the 13th Plaid Cymru formed a minority government.

Reform UK is the official opposition with 33 seats. Both Welsh Labour and the Welsh Conservatives have enough seats to cooperate with Plaid in order to have a majority to pass laws.

=== Current seats ===
Following the 2026 Senedd election, there are 6 parties represented in the Senedd, 4 of them are official Senedd groups (those with 5 or more seats) which are allocated speaking time in debates, are represented on Senedd committees, can table motions and questions, and have access to more resources and staff.

On 15 September 2026 Sarah Cooper-Lesadd, MS for Pen-y-Bont Bro Morgannwg defected from Reform UK to Plaid Cymru.

Current Senedd
Party	Seats at beginning of Senedd term	Current Seats
Plaid Cymru	43	44
Reform UK	34	33
Labour	9	9
Conservative	7	7
Greens	2	2
Liberal Democrats	1	1

== Officials ==
=== Elected officials ===
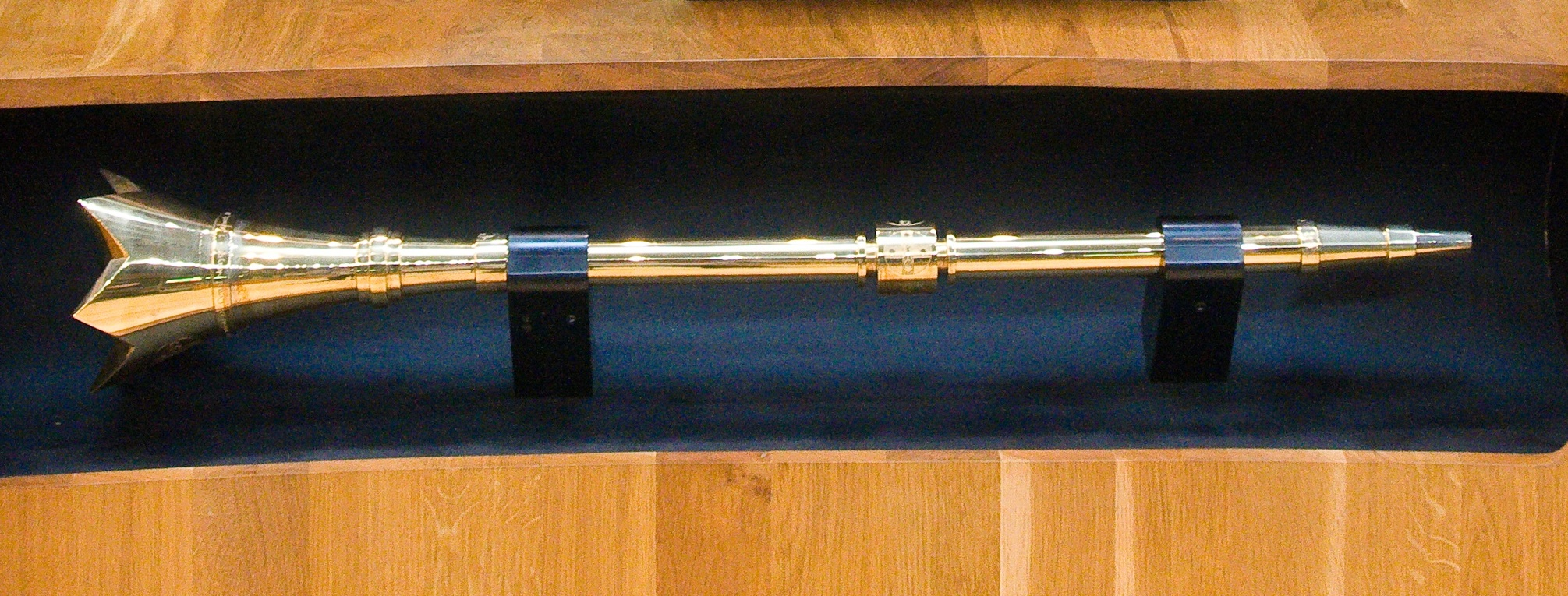
The Senedd's ceremonial mace, Byrllysg, sits in front of the Presiding Officer's desk in the Senedd chamber.

After each election, the Senedd elects one Member of the Senedd to serve as Llywydd (Presiding Officer) of the Senedd, and another to serve as Deputy Presiding Officer (Dirprwy Lywydd). There is also provisions for an additional Dirprwy Lywydd in the standing orders. Huw Irranca-Davies, Welsh Labour MS, has been Llywydd since 2026, having taken over from Elin Jones. The Llywydd also acts as Chair of the Senedd Commission. Both the Llywydd and the Deputy Presiding Officer (Dirprwy Lywydd) typically don't vote in simple-majority votes, but can vote if there is a tie.

=== Permanent officials ===
The permanent administrative and support staff of the Senedd are employed by the Senedd Commission. They are not civil servants, although they enjoy similar terms and conditions of service to members of the UK Civil Service. The most senior permanent official is the chief executive and clerk, and the position is currently held by Manon Antoniazzi.

== Elections ==
Percentage of seats won in each election by political group, 1999 to 2026. Left to right:

Labour Lib Dem	Plaid Cymru Green	John Marek (2003) People's Voice (2007)	UKIP Reform	Conservative

There have been seven elections to the Senedd, in 1999, 2003, 2007, 2011, 2016, 2021 and 2026. The 2016 election was delayed from 2015 as the UK general election was held in 2015.

The 2026 Senedd election was held on Thursday 7 May 2026. It was the first election following numerous reforms: an increase in the size of the Senedd from 60 members to 96, the adoption of party-list proportional representation, the reduction of the number of constituencies to sixteen, and the shortening of its term from five years to four.

=== Summary ===
Assembly/ Senedd	Year	Turnout	Seats								Governments
Assembly/ Senedd	Year	Turnout	Green	Plaid Cymru	Labour	Lib Dems	Conservative	UKIP	Reform	Others	Governments
	1997	50%	Devolution referendum								
1st	1999	46%	0	17	28	6	9	–	–	–	Michael (Labour minority) Interim Morgan (Labour minority) Morgan I (Labour – LD)
2nd	2003	38%	0	12	30	6	11	0	–	1 (JMIP)	Morgan II (Labour majority until 2005), minority after 2005 (Note: With the Presiding and Deputy Presiding Officer both coming from the opposition Labour had 30 voting members to the oppositions collective 28. This government officially became a minority government in 2005 after Peter Law left Labour to sit as an independent on the opposition benches, giving the government 29 and the opposition (excluding the Presiding Officer and Deputy) 29.)
3rd	2007	44%	0	15	26	6	12	0	–	1 (BGPVG)	Morgan III (Labour minority) Morgan IV (Labour – Plaid) Jones I (Labour – Plaid)
	2011	36%	Devolution referendum								
4th	2011	42%	0	11	30	5	14	0	–	–	Jones II (Labour minority)
5th	2016	45%	0	12	29	1	11	7	–	–	Jones III (Labour–LD minority, Lib Dem coalition) Drakeford I (Labour–LD–IND majority)
6th	2021	47%	0	13	30	1	16	0	0	–	Drakeford II (Labour minority) Gething (Labour minority) Eluned Morgan (Labour minority)
	2024	Senedd Cymru (Members and Elections) Act changes voting system and increases the Senedd from 60 to 96 seats from the next election									
7th	2026	52%	2	43	9	1	7	–	34	–	Ap Iorwerth government (Plaid minority)

=== 2026 election ===
2026 Senedd election results
Party	Votes	%	Seats
Plaid Cymru	444,665	35.41	43
Reform UK	367,985	29.30	34
Labour	139,203	11.08	9
Conservative	134,926	10.74	7
Green Party	84,608	6.74	2
Liberal Democrats	56,012	4.46	1
Heritage Party	5,474	0.44	0
Propel	4,032	0.32	0
Gwlad	2,479	0.20	0
Open Party	684	0.05	0
Welsh Christian Party	456	0.04	0
Britain's Communist Party	354	0.03	0
Socialist Labour Party	285	0.02	0
Official Monster Raving Loony Party	279	0.02	0
Trade Unionist and Socialist Coalition	244	0.02	0
Social Democratic Party	165	0.01	0
Independents	14,063	1.12	0
Total	1,255,914	100.00	96
Registered voters/turnout	2,433,921	51.6	
Source: Sky News BBC

=== Turnout ===
Voter turnout at Senedd elections has been historically been lower than UK general elections. The 2026 election turnout was for the first time in a Senedd election above 50%, reaching 51.6%, however that is still lower than recent UK general elections in Wales (56% in 2024). In their 2004 paper Turnout, Participation and Legitimacy in Post-Devolution Wales, academics Roger Awan-Scully, Richard Wyn Jones and Dafydd Trystan Davies identified three potential reasons for this: antipathy to the Welsh institutions, apathy to the Welsh institutions or apathy to politics more generally. They suggested apathy – in Wales and to politics in general – is the most likely reason.

Following the 2021 election, Dr Jac Larner, a politics lecturer at Cardiff University and an investigator for the Welsh election survey, said the lower turnout figures in Wales did not necessarily reflect a lack of perceived importance in the Senedd. He told BBC News: "We know from research that low voter turnout is actually a lot do to with people thinking they can't win in a devolved election, so they don't bother going to vote. That's different to a general election where, in Wales, Labour are still more likely to win a majority of seats, but at the UK level it's far more competitive." He compared turnout in Wales to turnout for Scottish Parliament elections, which is significantly higher: "Scotland is in quite a unique political position at the moment, where the single most salient issue and the biggest cleavage in society – the issue of independence – basically is going to be determined by what happens at the Holyrood elections. Part of it is this idea of interest – there has always been more interest in the idea of a Scottish Parliament, the Scottish Parliament has always been more powerful than the Senedd, even going back to 1999."

== Buildings ==
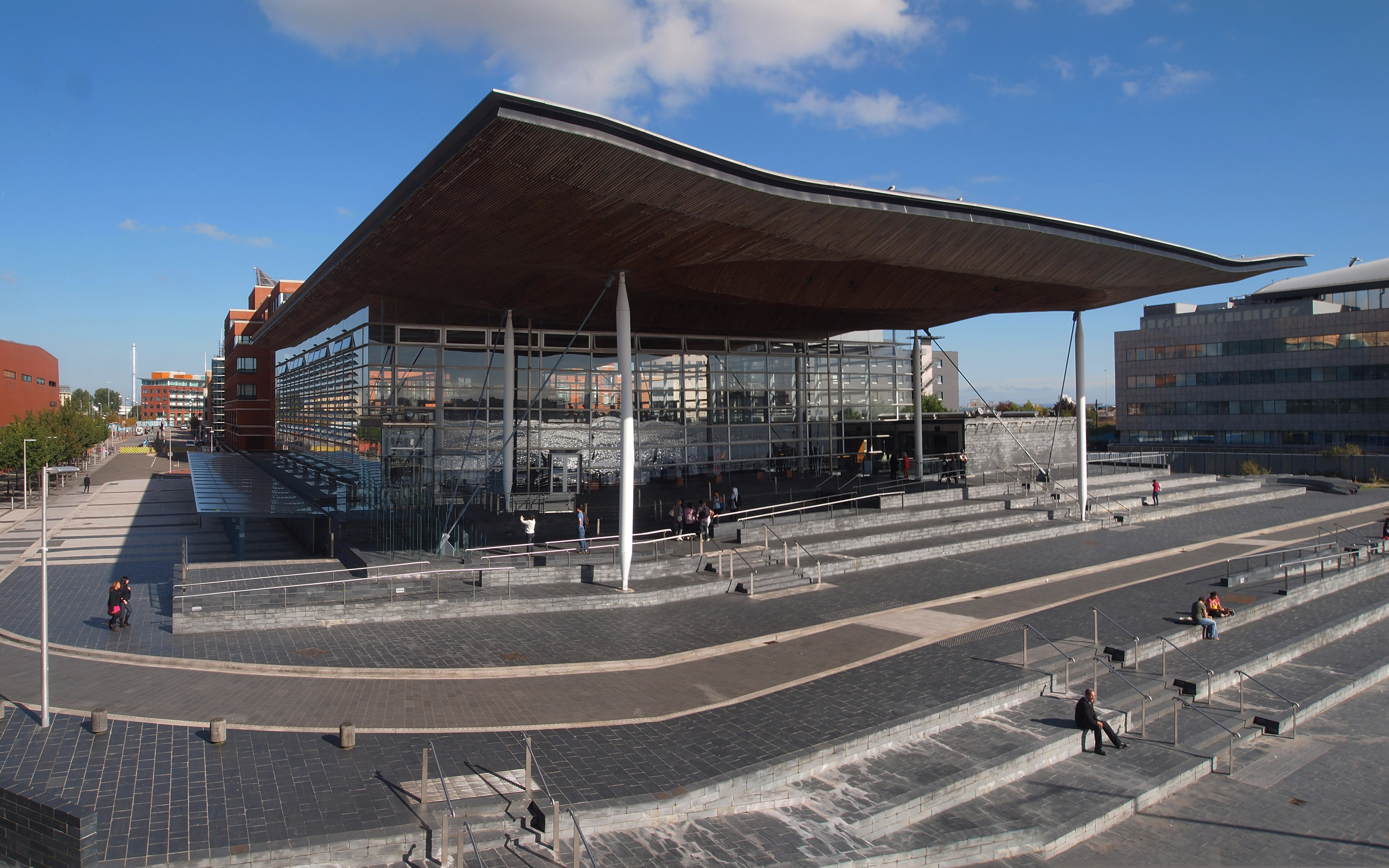
The Senedd building

=== Senedd building ===
The debating chamber in Cardiff Bay, the Senedd (Senate), was designed by the Richard Rogers Partnership, and built by Taylor Woodrow, with environmental, mechanical, electrical and plumbing design by BDSP Partnership. It uses traditional Welsh materials, such as slate and Welsh oak, in its construction, and the design is based around the concepts of openness and transparency. The timber ceiling and centre funnel, manufactured and installed by BCL Timber Projects (sub-contracted by Taylor Woodrow) is made from Canadian sourced Western Red Cedar.

The Senedd building

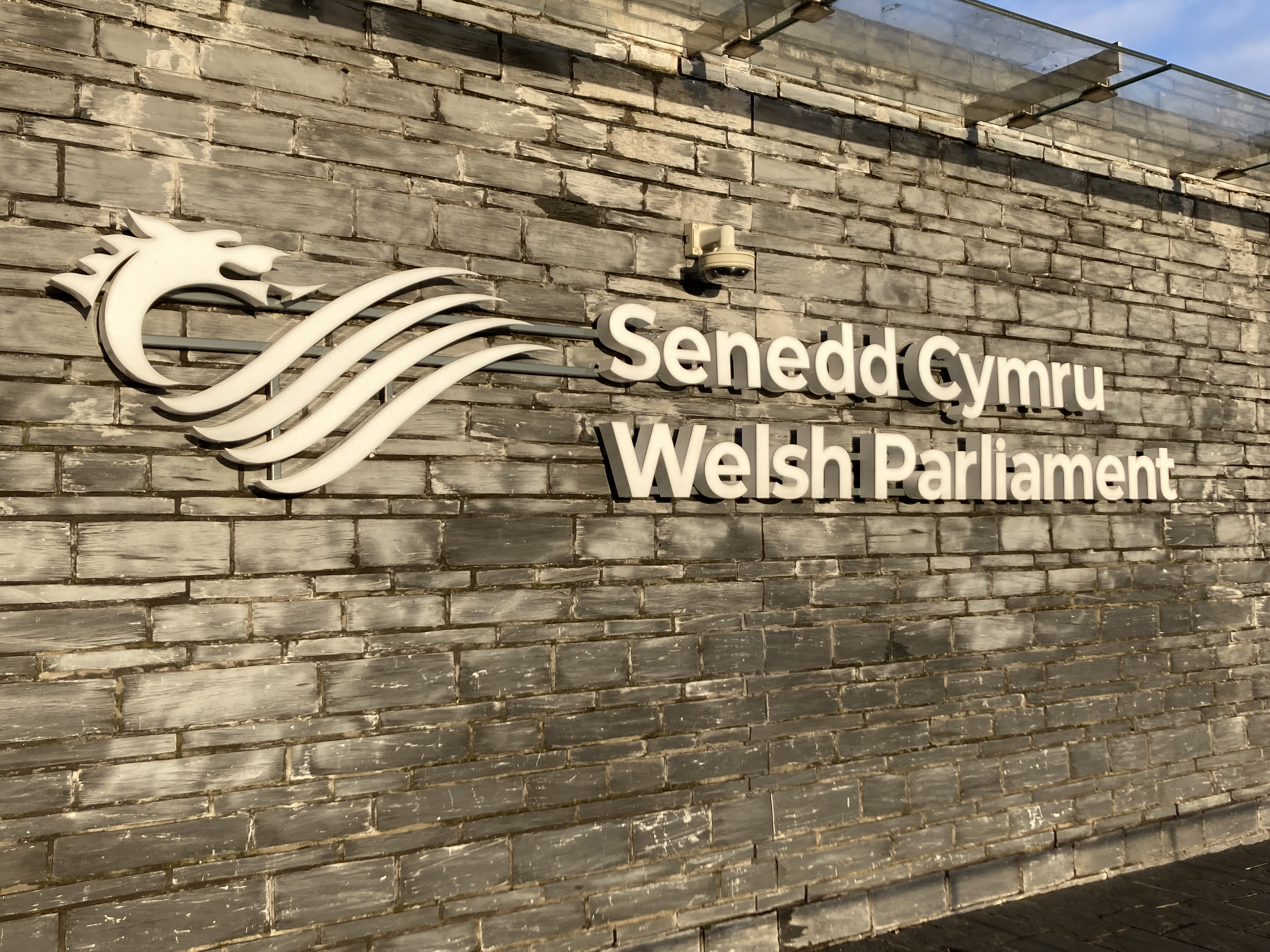
Logo of the Senedd Cymru – Welsh Parliament on the outside of the building

The Senedd houses the debating chamber known as the Siambr (Welsh: Y Siambr) and Committee Rooms. It was officially opened by Queen Elizabeth II on Saint David's Day, 1 March 2006.

The Senedd is designed to be environmentally friendly: it uses an Earth Heat Exchange system for heating; rainwater is collected from the roof and used for flushing toilets and cleaning windows, and the roof features a wind cowl which funnels natural light and air into the debating chamber below.

=== Telecasting ===
Screenshot of the front page of senedd.tv in 2022

The building houses the debating chamber and committee rooms for the Senedd. When the Senedd building opened on 1 March 2006, there was regular screening of live proceedings from the Siambr on S4C2 and also on internet television. Coverage of the S4C2 screenings were on Tuesdays, Wednesdays and Thursdays between 9:00 am 6:00 pm when the Senedd was sitting. In addition, limited screens were shown on the BBC Two Wales programme "am.pm", including First Minister's Questions. These were decommissioned after S4C2 switched its scheduling to children programs and because of budget cuts. Internet television screenings are now shown on the Senedd's own website called Senedd.tv, which screens approximately 35 hours of content each week in English and Welsh. The service began 15 April 2008. Key events such as First Minister's Questions are shown live and recorded on BBC Parliament on television and on iPlayer. Also on BBC Parliament some proceedings are shown as highlights of the week on the programme The Week in Parliament.

In October 2023, GB News was banned from the Senedd's internal TV system, with a spokesperson for the presiding officer claiming the channel was "deliberately offensive, demeaning to public debate and contrary to our parliament's values".

=== Tŷ Hywel and Pierhead Building ===
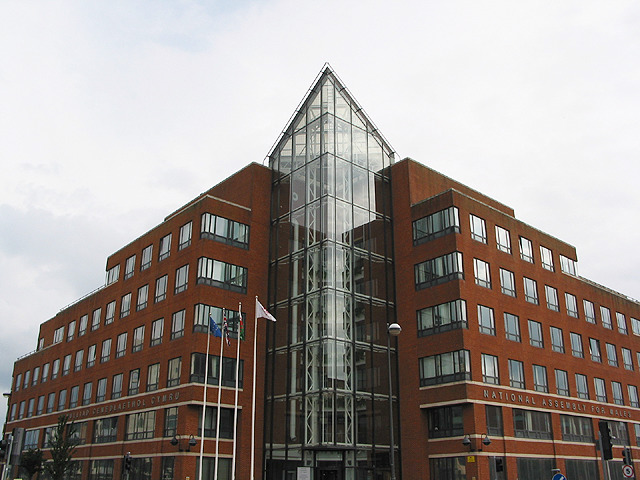
Tŷ Hywel

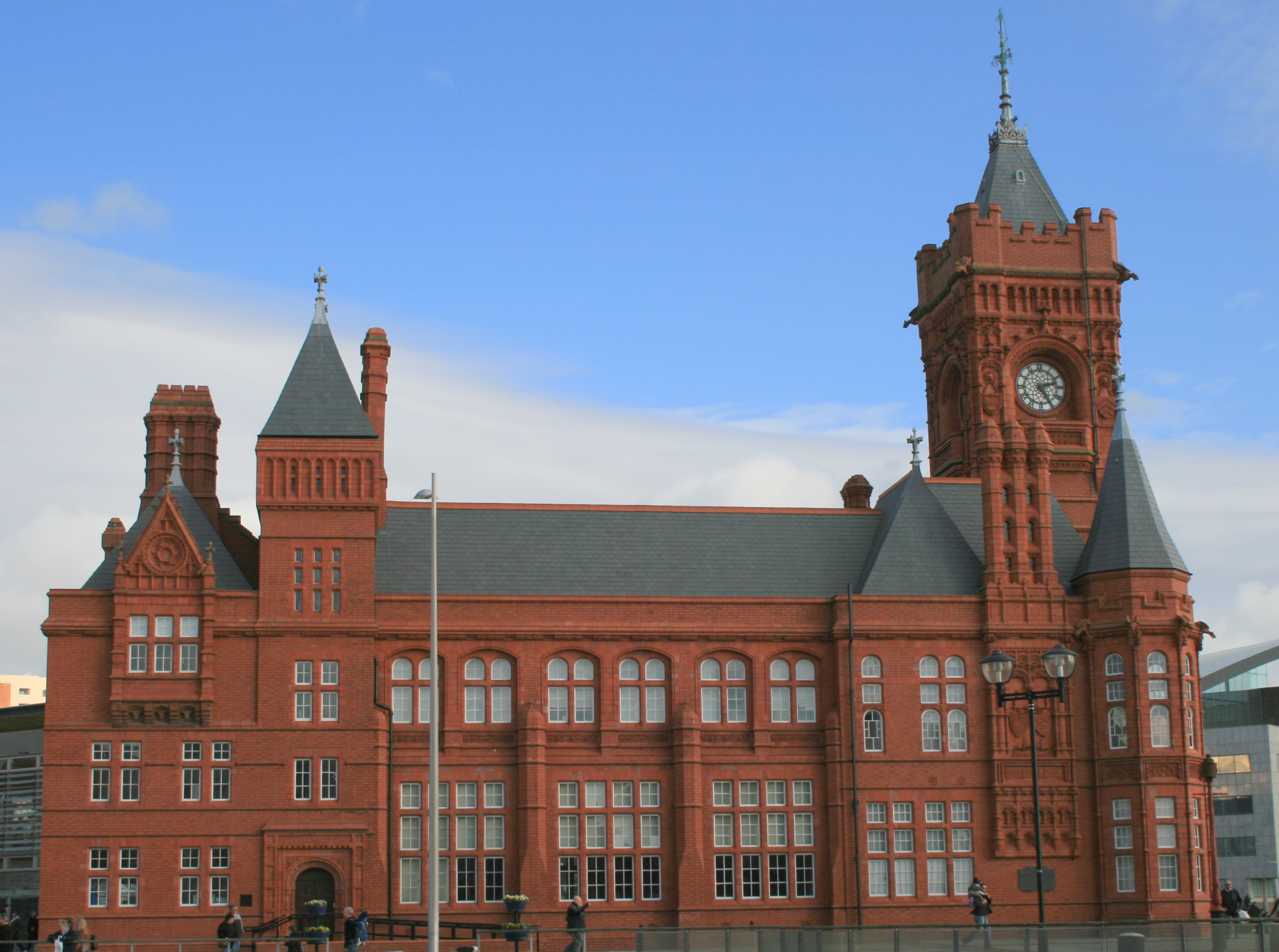
The Pierhead Building

Between 1999 and 2006, a temporary debating chamber was initially based in Tŷ Hywel, next to the site of the present building. The offices of Members are still in this building which is connected to the Senedd by a skyway. Tŷ Hywel once again hosts plenary sessions of the Senedd between April 2025 and March 2026 whilst the debating chamber in the Senedd building undergoes refurbishment to increase its capacity in the lead up to the next Senedd election where the number of members returned is to rise to 96.

The Senedd Commission is also responsible for the Pierhead Building, which is the location of "The Assembly at the Pierhead" exhibition, and is the Visitor and Education Centre for the Senedd as well as housing a small gift shop. The exhibition provides visitors with information on the history, functions and day-to-day work of the Senedd.

=== North Wales Office ===
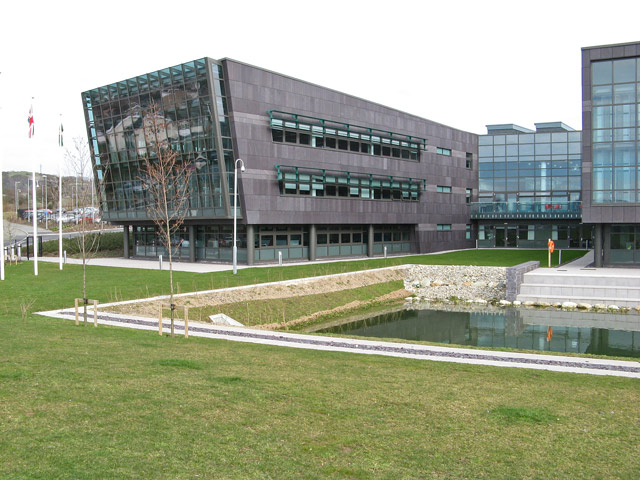
Senedd North Wales Office

The Senedd North Wales Office is located at Government Buildings, Llandudno Junction. The office is open to the public to access information about the Senedd on weekdays between 10:00 and 12:00 and 14:00 and 16:00. Previously the office was located at Prince's Park, Colwyn Bay.

== Inclusivity review ==
In 2026, the Senedd’s Family Friendly and Inclusive Parliament Review Board, chaired by Joyce Watson MS, commissioned a review of inclusive policies at the Senedd. The report (Parken, Hibbs, and Minto) found that there was a lack of representation of parents with young children, many members were juggling caring responsibilities, long working hours squeeze family time, and there was a lack of diversity in relation to socio-economic status, and ethnic minority, LGBTQ and disabled people.

== See also ==
- Act of Senedd Cymru – Primary legislation enacted by the Senedd
- List of by-elections to the Senedd
- List of devolved matters in Wales
- List of Senedd elections
- Member of the Senedd – Representative in the devolved parliament of Wales
- Northern Ireland Assembly – Devolved legislature of Northern Ireland
- Regional member changes to the Senedd
- Scottish Parliament – Devolved parliament of Scotland
- Senedd constituencies and electoral regions – Welsh Parliament electoral districts
- Wales-only laws
- Welsh law – Primary and secondary legislation generated by the Senedd
