= Act of Senedd Cymru =

Primary legislation enacted by the Senedd

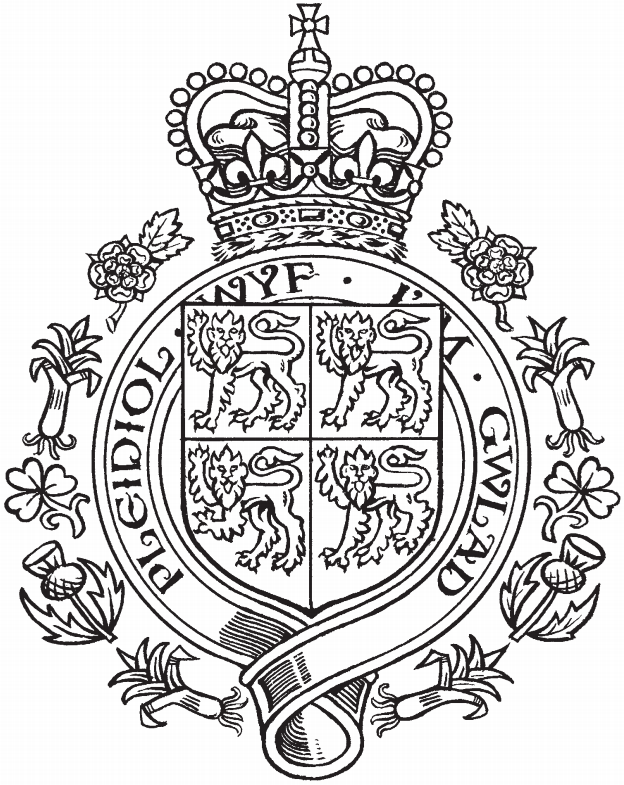
The Royal Badge of Wales as it appears on Acts of Senedd Cymru.

An Act of Senedd Cymru (Welsh: Deddf gan Senedd Cymru), or informally an Act of the Senedd (Welsh: Deddf gan y Senedd), is primary legislation that can be made by the Senedd (Welsh Parliament; Welsh: Senedd Cymru) under part 4 of the Government of Wales Act 2006 (as amended by the Wales Act 2017). Prior to 6 May 2020, primary legislation was formally known as an Act of the National Assembly for Wales (Welsh: Deddf Cynulliad Cenedlaethol Cymru) or informally, an Act of the Assembly.

The power to make primary legislation was conferred on the assembly following the 2011 elections as a commencement order had been passed in the Assembly by simple majority prior to dissolution. The activation of part 4 legislative powers was as a result of a "yes" vote in the 2011 referendum held in Wales. When the power to make Acts of the Assembly commenced, the Assembly lost the ability to make Measures under part 3 of the 2006 Act. Existing Measures will remain as law unless repealed.

The current name was adopted when the Senedd and Elections (Wales) Act 2020 took effect on 6 May 2020, which renamed the "Acts of the National Assembly for Wales" stated in section 107(1) of the Government of Wales Act 2006 as officially "Acts of Senedd Cymru" (plural Welsh: Deddfau Senedd Cymru) and informally referred to as “Acts of the Senedd”.

== Procedure ==
=== Consideration by the Senedd ===
Bills may be introduced by Welsh Government, a committee of the Senedd, the Senedd Commission or by individual Members of the Senedd. Ballots are held to select which individual Senedd members may present bills.

Once a bill is introduced, there are four stages that need to be completed prior to the bill being submitted for royal assent. The first stage involves consideration of the general principles of the bill by a committee of the Senedd and then agreement of these principles by the Senedd in plenary session. In the second stage, the bill is considered in detail by a bill committee. The third stage involves detailed consideration of the bill and any amendments by the Senedd in plenary, this can be followed by a Report Stage where further amendments can be proposed. Finally, in the fourth stage, the Senedd votes to pass the bill in its final form.

=== Period of intimation and royal assent ===
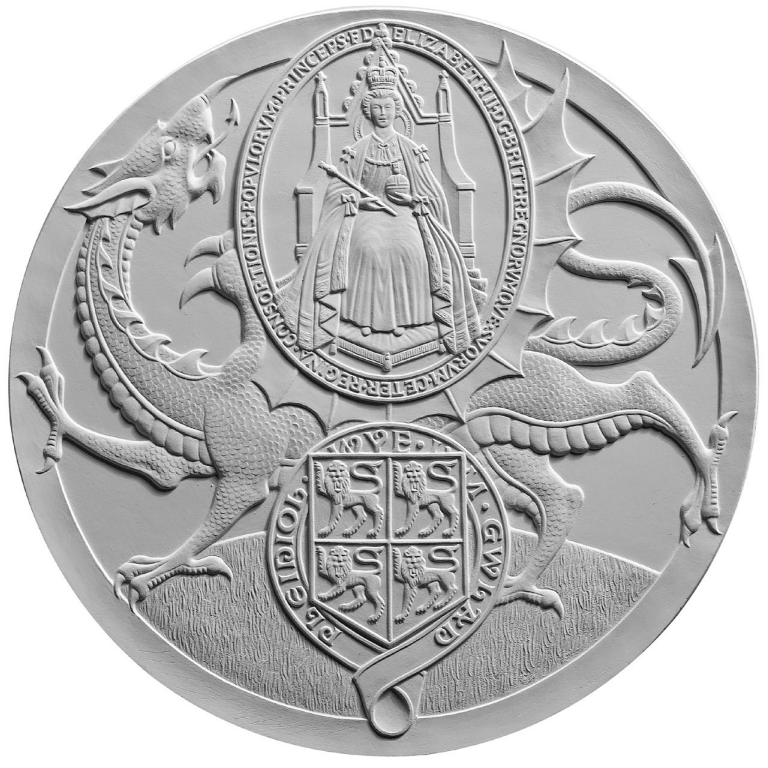
The Welsh Seal struck during the reign of Elizabeth II

When a bill completes its passage through the Senedd, it enters a four-week period of intimation, during which the Attorney General for England and Wales or the Counsel General for Wales may refer the bill to the Supreme Court of the United Kingdom if they consider that any provisions of the bill are outside the legislative competency of the Senedd. The Secretary of State for Wales may also make an order prohibiting the Presiding Officer from submitting the Bill for royal assent during this time. After the period of intimation expires, the Presiding Officer may submit the bill for royal assent. The bill becomes an act of the Senedd when letters patent under the Welsh Seal are made by the King, Charles III to signify assent.

Royal assent to acts of the National Assembly for Wales was given by means of letters patent using the following wording:

Letters patent for an act receiving royal assent

ELIZABETH THE SECOND by the Grace of God of the United Kingdom of Great Britain and Northern Ireland and of Our other Realms and Territories Queen Head of the Commonwealth Defender of the Faith To Our Trusty and well beloved the members of the National Assembly for Wales GREETING:

FORASMUCH as one or more Bills have been passed by the National Assembly for Wales and have been submitted to Us for Our Royal Assent by the Clerk of the National Assembly for Wales in accordance with the Government of Wales Act 2006 the short Titles of which Bills are set forth in the Schedule hereto but those Bills by virtue of the Government of Wales Act 2006 do not become Acts of the National Assembly for Wales nor have effect in the Law without Our Royal Assent signified by Letters Patent under Our Welsh Seal signed with Our own hand We have therefore caused these Our Letters Patent to be made and have signed them and by them do give Our Royal Assent to those Bills which shall be taken and accepted as good and perfect Acts of the Assembly and be put in due execution accordingly

COMMANDING ALSO the Keeper of Our Welsh Seal to seal these Our Letters with that Seal.

IN WITNESS WHEREOF We have caused these Our Letters to be made Patent

WITNESS Ourself at ... the ... day of ... in the ... year of Our Reign

By The Queen Herself Signed with Her Own Hand

The letters patent may also be made in Welsh:

Letters patent for an act receiving royal assent

ELISABETH YR AIL drwy Ras Duw Brenhines Teyrnas Unedig Prydain Fawr a Gogledd Iwerddon a’n Teyrnasoedd a’n Tiriogaethau eraill Pennaeth y Gymanwlad Amddiffynnydd y Ffydd At Ein Ffyddlon ac anwylaf aelodau Cynulliad Cenedlaethol Cymru CYFARCHION:

YN GYMAINT Â BOD un neu ragor o Filiau, y nodir eu henwau byr yn yr Atodlen i hyn, wedi eu pasio gan Gynulliad Cenedlaethol Cymru ac wedi eu cyflwyno i Ni ar gyfer Ein Cydsyniad Brenhinol gan Glerc Cynulliad Cenedlaethol Cymru yn unol â Deddf Llywodraeth Cymru 2006, ond na ddaw’r Biliau hynny, yn rhinwedd Deddf Llywodraeth Cymru 2006, yn Ddeddfau Cynulliad Cenedlaethol Cymru ac na fydd iddynt effaith Gyfreithiol heb Ein Cydsyniad Brenhinol a ddynodir drwy Freinlythyrau o dan Ein Sêl Gymreig a’n llofnod Ein Hunain, yr Ydym felly wedi peri gwneud y rhain, Ein Breinlythyrau ac wedi eu llofnodi, a thrwyddynt rhoddwn Ein Cydsyniad Brenhinol i’r Biliau hynny sydd i’w cymryd a’u derbyn fel Deddfau da a pherffaith y Cynulliad a’u rhoi ar waith yn briodol yn unol â hynny GAN ORCHYMYN HEFYD Geidwad Ein Sêl Gymreig i selio’r rhain, Ein Llythyrau â’r Sêl honno.

YN DYSTIOLAETH O HYNNY yr Ydym wedi peri gwneud y rhain, Ein Llythyrau yn Agored

TYSTIED Ein Hunain yn ... ar y ... dydd o .. . yn ... blwyddyn ... Ein Teyrnasiad

Llofnodwyd gan y Frenhines Ei Hunan â’i Llaw Ei Hunan

Royal assent to acts of Senedd Cymru are given by means of letters patent using the following wording:

Letters patent for an act receiving royal assent

CHARLES THE THIRD by the Grace of God of the United Kingdom of Great Britain and Northern Ireland and of Our other Realms and Territories King Head of the Commonwealth Defender of the Faith To Our Trusty and well beloved the Members of the Senedd

GREETINGS:

FORASMUCH as one or more Bills have been passed by Senedd Cymru and have been submitted to Us for Our Royal Assent by the Presiding Officer of Senedd Cymru in accordance with the Government of Wales Act 2006 the short Titles of which Bills are set forth in the Schedule hereto but those Bills by virtue of the Government of Wales Act 2006 do not become Acts of Senedd Cymru nor have effect in the Law without Our Royal Assent signified by Letters Patent under Our Welsh Seal signed with Our own hand We have therefore caused these Our Letters Patent to be made and have signed them and by them do give Our Royal Assent to those Bills which shall be taken and accepted as good and perfect Acts of the Senedd and be put in due execution accordingly COMMANDING ALSO the Keeper of Our Welsh Seal to seal these Our Letters with that Seal.

IN WITNESS WHEREOF We have caused these Our Letters to be made Patent

WITNESS Ourself at ... the ... day of ... in the ... year of Our Reign

By The King Himself Signed with His Own Hand.

The letters patent were also made in Welsh:

Letters patent for an act receiving royal assent

CHARLES Y TRYDYDD drwy Ras Duw Brenin Teyrnas Unedig Prydain Fawr a Gogledd Iwerddon a’n Teyrnasoedd a’n Tiriogaethau eraill Pennaeth y Gymanwlad Amddiffynnydd y Ffydd At Ein Ffyddlon ac anwylaf Aelodau o’r Senedd:

CYFARCHION:

YN GYMAINT Â BOD un neu ragor o Filiau, y nodir eu henwau byr yn yr Atodlen i hyn, wedi eu pasio gan Senedd Cymru ac wedi eu cyflwyno i Ni ar gyfer Ein Cydsyniad Brenhinol gan Lywydd Senedd Cymru yn unol â Deddf Llywodraeth Cymru 2006, ond na ddaw’r Biliau hynny, yn rhinwedd Deddf Llywodraeth Cymru 2006, yn Ddeddfau Senedd Cymru ac na fydd iddynt effaith Gyfreithiol heb Ein Cydsyniad Brenhinol a ddynodir drwy Freinlythyrau o dan Ein Sêl Gymreig a’n llofnod Ein Hunain, yr Ydym felly wedi peri gwneud y rhain, Ein Breinlythyrau ac wedi eu llofnodi, a thrwyddynt rhoddwn Ein Cydsyniad Brenhinol i’r Biliau hynny sydd i’w cymryd a’u derbyn fel Deddfau da a pherffaith y Senedd a’u rhoi ar waith yn briodol yn unol â hynny GAN ORCHYMYN HEFYD Geidwad Ein Sêl Gymreig i selio’r rhain, Ein Llythyrau â’r Sêl honno.

YN DYSTIOLAETH O HYNNY yr Ydym wedi peri gwneud y rhain, Ein Llythyrau yn Agored

TYSTIED Ein Hunain yn . . . ar . . . o’n Teyrnasiad

Llofnodwyd gan y Brenin Ei Hunan â’i Law Ei Hunan.

=== Enacting formula ===
Acts of the National Assembly for Wales begin with the following words of enactment:

[in English:] Having been passed by the National Assembly for Wales and having received the assent of Her Majesty, it is enacted as follows:

[in Welsh:] Gan ei fod wedi ei basio gan Gynulliad Cenedlaethol Cymru ac wedi derbyn cydsyniad Ei Mawrhydi, deddfir fel a ganlyn:

Acts of Senedd Cymru begin with the following words of enactment:

[in English:] Having been passed by Senedd Cymru and having received the assent of His Majesty, it is enacted as follows:

[in Welsh:] Gan ei fod wedi ei basio gan Senedd Cymru ac wedi derbyn cydsyniad Ei Fawrhydi, deddfir fel a ganlyn:

== Subjects in which acts cannot be made ==
Under the Wales Act 2017, the Senedd has legislative competence to pass Acts on any matter relating only to Wales that is not a reserved matter, or which affects powers exercisable other than in relation to Wales. The list of reserved matters is extensive; it includes:

- the Crown, the union with England, and the UK Parliament;
- the Civil Service;
- regulation, registration and finances of political parties;
- whether Senedd elections may be held on the same day as certain other elections and referendums;
- the Electoral Commission and certain other matters related the regulation of Senedd and local government elections and campaigning;
- the legal system and international law, including legal aid, arbitration, coroners, prisons, offender management, rehabilitation of offenders, and criminal records;
- family law, except parental discipline (Wales banned physical punishment of children in 2020, whereas it is still legal in England);
- crime, public order, and policing and police and crime commissioners;
- foreign affairs including nationality, immigration and travel documents, extradition, and international trade;
- defence, national security, terrorism, and official secrets;
- fiscal, economic and monetary policy, except for devolved and local taxes;
- financial services and markets;
- communications (including Internet services) and communications data, encryption, surveillance, data protection, and freedom of information;
- modern slavery and prostitution;
- emergency powers;
- firearms, poisons, knives, drug abuse, and drug dealing;
- film and video (including video game) classification;
- licensing of entertainment venues and provision of alcohol;
- gambling;
- hunting with dogs;
- animal testing;
- charities and philanthropy;
- insolvency;
- competition;
- intellectual property;
- consumer protection;
- postal services, except financial assistance for post offices;
- most aspects of road, rail, air and sea transport and transport security;
- social security, child support and child maintenance payments, pensions and public sector and armed forces compensation in cases of death etc., job search and job support;
- employment rights and industrial relations;
- regulation of the professions, except for social work and social care;
- abortion;
- xenotransplantation;
- embryology, surrogacy and genetics;
- medicines, including veterinary medicines;
- health and safety;
- gender recognition.

Additionally, unlike Acts of the UK Parliament, an Act of the Senedd is "not law" if it is inconsistent with the European Convention on Human Rights.

== See also ==
- List of acts and measures of Senedd Cymru
- Measure of the National Assembly for Wales
