= List of acts and measures of Senedd Cymru =

This is a list of acts of Senedd Cymru (referred to as acts of the National Assembly for Wales if passed before 6 May 2020) and measures of the National Assembly for Wales, passed by Senedd Cymru (the Welsh Parliament; or simply the Senedd) from its establishment as the National Assembly for Wales in 1999 until the present. Following the passing of the Government of Wales Act 2006, the (then) National Assembly was conferred with the power to pass Measures on 3 May 2007. It has no longer been possible for the Senedd to pass Measures since 5 May 2011, when it was instead conferred with the power to pass Acts of Senedd Cymru (then known as Acts of the National Assembly for Wales) following a referendum. On 6 May 2020, the National Assembly for Wales was renamed Senedd Cymru (or, in English, the Welsh Parliament).

- List of measures of the National Assembly for Wales from 2008
- List of measures of the National Assembly for Wales from 2009
- List of measures of the National Assembly for Wales from 2010
- List of measures of the National Assembly for Wales from 2011
- List of acts of the National Assembly for Wales from 2012
- List of acts of the National Assembly for Wales from 2013
- List of acts of the National Assembly for Wales from 2014
- List of acts of the National Assembly for Wales from 2015
- List of acts of the National Assembly for Wales from 2016
- List of acts of the National Assembly for Wales from 2017
- List of acts of the National Assembly for Wales from 2018
- List of acts of the National Assembly for Wales from 2019
- List of acts of the National Assembly for Wales and acts of Senedd Cymru from 2020
- List of acts of Senedd Cymru from 2021
- List of acts of Senedd Cymru from 2022
- List of acts of Senedd Cymru from 2023
- List of acts of Senedd Cymru from 2024
- List of acts of Senedd Cymru from 2025
- List of acts of Senedd Cymru from 2026
