= John Bird, Baron Bird =

British social entrepreneur and life peer

The Right Honourable The Lord Bird MBE
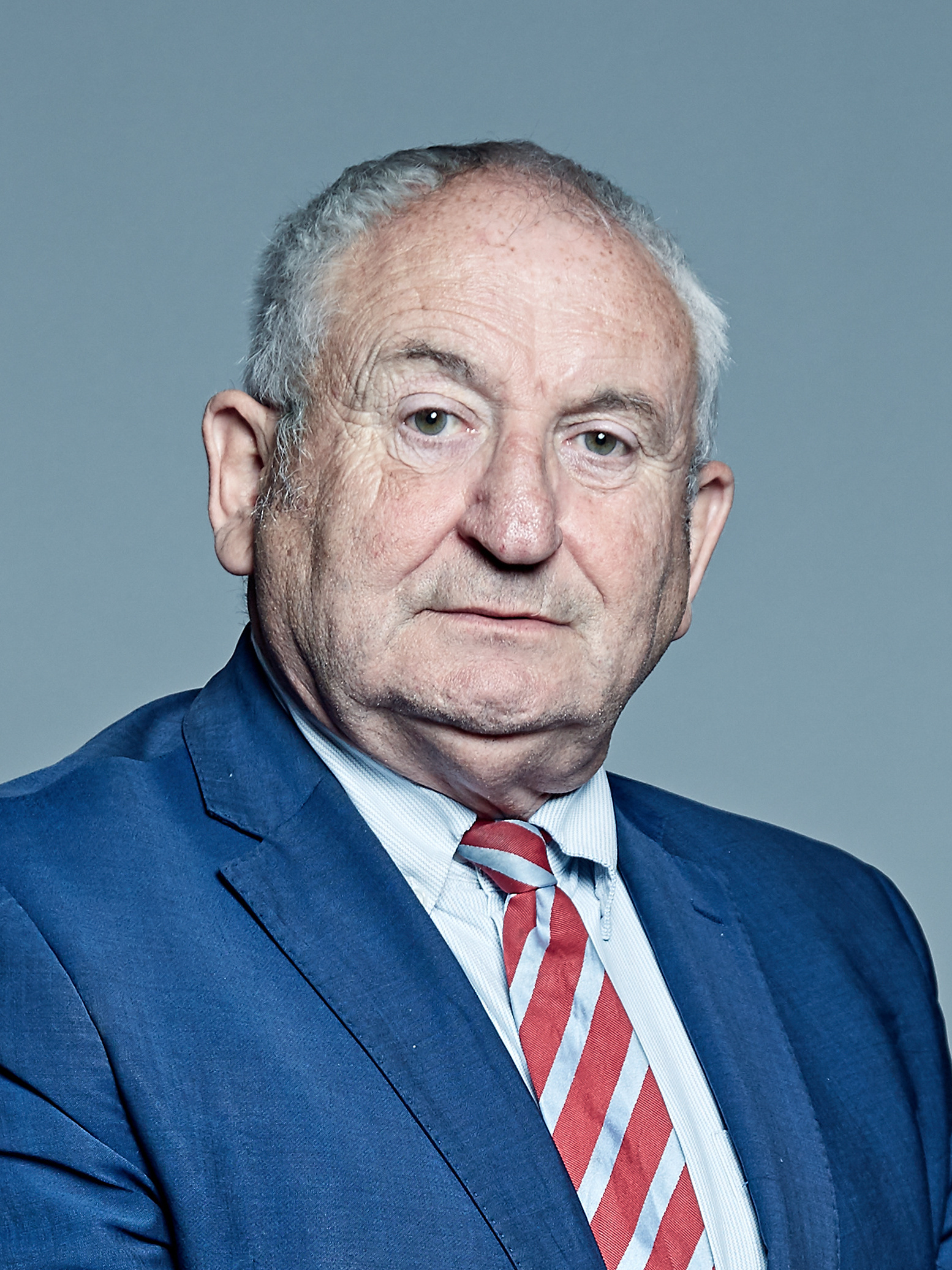

Member of the House of Lords
- Lord Temporal
- Life peerage 30 October 2015

Personal details
- Born: John Anthony Bird; 30 January 1946 (age 80) Notting Hill, London, England
- Education: Chelsea School of Art
- Known for: The Big Issue
- Awards: MBE; Life Peer

John Anthony Bird, Baron Bird MBE (born 30 January 1946), is a British social entrepreneur and life peer. He is best known as the co-founder of The Big Issue, a magazine edited by professional journalists and sold by street vendors who are largely homeless or vulnerably housed. Bird sits as an independent crossbench member of the House of Lords.

== Early life ==
Bird was born in a Notting Hill slum to a poor London Irish family. He became homeless aged five, resided in an orphanage from ages seven to ten, and was often excluded from school.

He became a butcher's boy after leaving the orphanage, and supplemented his income by stealing. During his teens and twenties, he spent several spells in prison, where he learnt to read, write and the basics of printing.

Bird attended Chelsea School of Art, and was homeless again by 1967, sleeping rough in Edinburgh while being sought by the police for petty offences. In the early 1970s, he started to build upon his prison education and set up a small-scale printing and publishing business in London.

For two weeks in 1970, he worked as a washer-up in the Palace of Westminster canteen, where he later returned upon being elevated to the peerage.

== The Big Issue and work with the homeless ==
In September 1991, Bird launched The Big Issue with Gordon Roddick, co-founder of The Body Shop.

In November 1995, he launched The Big Issue Foundation to further support vendors of The Big Issue.

He currently serves on the Board of Directors for The Big Issue Group—which incorporates The Big Issue, Big Issue Invest, Big Exchange, Big Issue Recruit, Big Issue Media, Big Issue Shop and Big Futures—and which work collectively to seek to dismantle poverty in the UK.

The Big Issue magazine started as a London venture, but expanded with specific editions and services to other British cities, and then to other countries. Bird is also a co-founder of the International Network of Street Papers, which now incorporates over 100 street papers and publishes in 34 countries in 24 languages.

In 2001, with The Big Issue Group chairman, Nigel Kershaw OBE, Bird founded Big Issue Invest, a provider of finance for businesses, charities and NGOs with the aim of creating positive social change. The social investment arm of The Big Issue Group, initially only dealing in loan finance, Big Issue Invest launched a social investment fund in 2009, and has since invested more than £30 million in hundreds of social enterprises making a positive impact in communities across the UK.

== Political work ==
Bird was a member of the Workers' Revolutionary Party in the 1970s.

In March 2007, Bird announced his intention to stand as an independent candidate for Mayor of London. In May 2007, he unveiled his election manifesto for the 2008 mayoral election, but in October of that year, Bird announced that he had decided not to run for mayor and was instead going to launch a movement "to try and do what the CND did over the bomb, but over social injustice". In November 2016, Bird suggested that he was initially asked to stand as the Conservative Party candidate in 2007—prior to the selection of the eventual winner (and later, Prime Minister) Boris Johnson—but refused the offer.

Bird was a Social Enterprise Ambassador, a scheme run by the Social Enterprise Coalition to promote awareness of social enterprise—a business model used to address a social or environmental needs. The programme was supported by the Office of the Third Sector, part of the Cabinet Office, and ran between 2007-10.

Bird revealed in 2010: "My secret is that I'm really a working-class Tory. I'd love to be a liberal, because they're the nice people, but it's really hard work. I can't swallow their gullibility and I think their ideas are stupid. I know this will destroy my reputation among middle-class liberals [but] wearing the corsetry of liberalism means that, every now and then, you have to take it off." He has since stated he has "been hurt by the Left, and helped by the Left. Just like I've been helped by the Right and hurt by the Right."

Nominated by the House of Lords Appointments Commission as a non-party political people's peer, on 30 October 2015, he was created Baron Bird, of Notting Hill in the Royal Borough of Kensington and Chelsea (for life), sitting as a Crossbencher in the Upper House. In his maiden speech, Bird stated:

"Someone said to me, 'How did you get into the House of Lords?' and I said, 'By lying, cheating and stealing'."

Bird's work is non-partisan and focuses on dismantling the root causes of poverty in the UK, with an emphasis on the well-being of future generations, early intervention and prevention.

In Parliament, Bird speaks on poverty, social enterprise, social mobility, literacy and the Arts and has, in the past, acted as an officer of the All-Party Parliamentary Groups on Poverty, Ending Homelessness, Social Enterprise, Future Generations, Libraries. He has led and takes part in debates on poverty, literacy and social business, and was a member of the Lord Speaker's Advisory Panel on Works of Art between 2017-25.

Over 2019-22, Bird promoted his Wellbeing of Future Generations Bill—as part of a cross-party Today For Tomorrow campaign with Simon Fell and Caroline Lucas—to raise awareness of the importance of preventative and long-term policymaking. Inspired by the work of Sophie Howe and the Well-being of Future Generations (Wales) Act 2015, over 600 candidates pledged to support the Bill ahead of the 2019 general election, including Boris Johnson and Jeremy Corbyn.

In the current session of Parliament, Bird has introduced his Ministry for Poverty Prevention Bill, which would set poverty reduction targets and make provision for a reporting system for all government spending in relation to poverty.

== Honours and awards ==
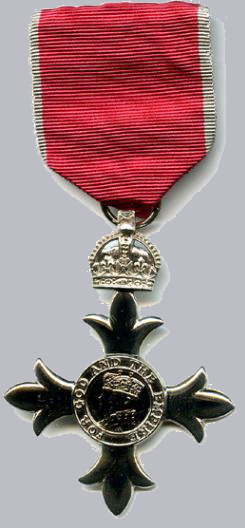
MBE insignia

Appointed a Member of the Order of the British Empire (MBE) for services to homeless people in the 1995 Birthday Honours, in 2006, Bird was awarded the Beacon Fellowship for his originality in raising awareness of homelessness and his support of homeless communities worldwide. He accepted the UN-HABITAT Scroll of Honour in 2004 from Mwai Kibaki, the then President of Kenya, on behalf of The Big Issue.

Bird currently serves as a Visiting Professor in the School of Journalism at the University of Lincoln. He holds an Honorary Doctorate of Business from Plymouth University and an Honorary Doctorate of Letters from Oxford Brookes University. Bird is also an Honorary Fellow of Liverpool John Moores University, Goldsmiths, University of London and the Workers' Educational Association.

Bird was the British Society of Magazine Editors' Editor of the Year in 1993 and was awarded The Revd. Marcus Morris Award from the Professional Publishers' Association in 2000. In 2018, Bird was inducted into the Professional Publishers' Association Hall of Fame.

In 2008, Bird was named Entrepreneur of the Year by Ernst & Young. In 2015, he became a Senior Fellow of Ashoka and in 2017, a Fellow of Social Enterprise UK. He received the Institute of Enterprise and Entrepreneurs' Lifetime Achievement Award in 2019.

== Published works ==
Bird has published several books, including an autobiography, Some Luck (2002), which recounts his journey from homelessness to founding The Big Issue, and The Necessity of Poverty (2012), which critiques conventional approaches to poverty, and draws from Bird's experiences in hardship.

Why Drawing Naked Women is Good for the Soul (2013) reflects on the role of art as a means of personal salvation and helping others. Bird's self-help books like Change Your Life (2008), The Ten Keys to Success (2008), and How to Change Your Life in Seven Steps (2006) offer advice for overcoming failure and achieving goals, while Dickens the Socially Mobile Cat (1990) is a satirical tale exploring social mobility through a cat’s perspective.

Do You Sincerely Want to Smash Capitalism and Have a Full Sex Life? is Bird's first novel and has been optioned for screen by Genesius Pictures, prior to landing a publishing deal.

== Family ==
Bird has been twice divorced. He married firstly in 1965 Linda Haston, having a daughter, Emily. He married secondly in 1973 to Tessa Swithinbank, the younger daughter of Sir Robert Ricketts and Theresa née Cripps, having a son, Patrick, and a daughter, Diana. Since 2004, Bird has been married to Lady Bird (Parveen Sodhi) having a son, Sonny and a daughter, Ishpriya.

Orders of precedence in the United Kingdom
Preceded by The Lord Mair	Gentlemen; Baron Bird	Followed by The Lord Price
