= Future generations =

People yet to be born

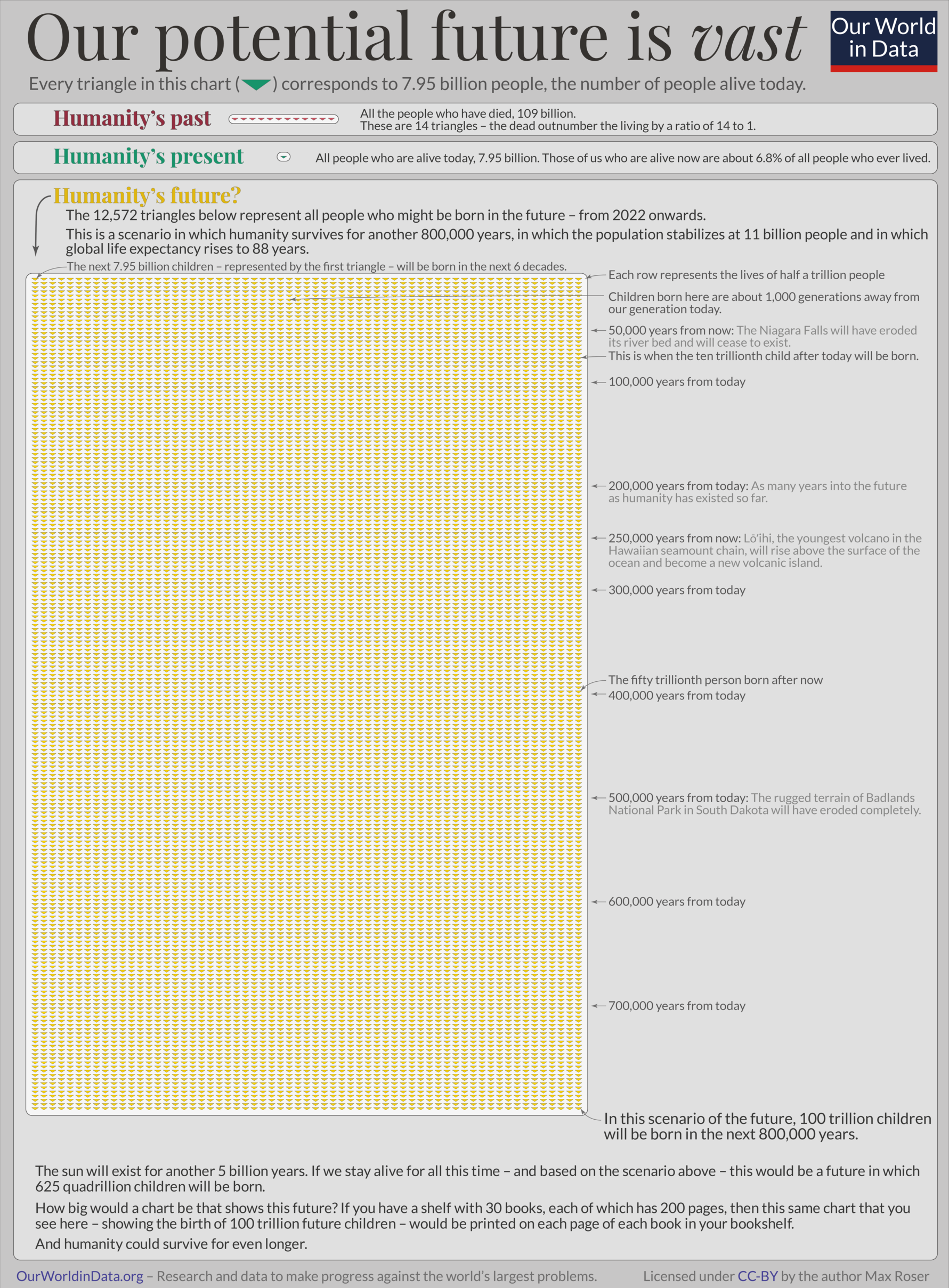
Illustrating the potential number of future human lives

Future generations are cohorts of hypothetical people not yet born. Future generations are contrasted with current and past generations and evoked in order to encourage thinking about intergenerational equity. The moral patienthood of future generations has been argued for extensively among philosophers, and is thought of as an important, neglected cause by the effective altruism community. The term is often used in describing the conservation or preservation of cultural heritage or natural heritage.

The sustainability and climate movements have adopted the concept as a tool for enshrining principles of long-term thinking into law. The concept is often connected to indigenous thinking as a principle for ecological action, such as the seven generation concept attributed to Iroquois tradition.

== Sources ==
The term refers to the impact which the currently living generation has on the world which future generations will live in, the world they will inherit from humans living today. This concept is referred to in the most widely quoted definition of sustainability as a part of the concept sustainable development, is that of the Brundtland Commission of the United Nations on March 20, (1987): "sustainable development is development that meets the needs of the present without compromising the ability of future generations to meet their own needs."

The use of future generations in international law is in part recognized by the Charter of the United Nations which focuses on preventing the "scourge of war" on future generations. With the publication of UN Secretary-General's landmark Our Common Agenda report in September 2021, there has been a renewed interest in understanding, action for, and representing future generations in the multilateral system.

=== UNESCO declaration ===
Proclaimed on November 12, 1997, the UNESCO Declaration on the Responsibilities of the Present Generations Towards Future Generations is an international agreement (potentially part of international customary law) which includes provisions related to the common heritage of mankind.

'The present generations have the responsibility to bequeath to future generations an Earth which will not one day be irreversibly damaged by human activity. Each generation inheriting the Earth temporarily should take care to use natural resources reasonably and ensure that life is not prejudiced by harmful modifications of the ecosystems and that scientific and technological progress in all fields does not harm life on Earth.'

— UNESCO, Declaration on Future Generations Article 4

'With due respect for human rights and fundamental freedoms, the present generations should take care to preserve the cultural diversity of humankind. The present generations have the responsibility to identify, protect and safeguard the tangible and intangible cultural heritage and to transmit this common heritage to future generations.'

— UNESCO, Declaration on Future Generations Article 7

'The present generations may use the common heritage of humankind, as defined in international law, provided that this does not entail compromising it irreversibly.'

— UNESCO, Declaration on Future Generations Article 8

'1. The present generations should ensure that both they and future generations learn to live together in peace, security, respect for international law, human rights and fundamental freedoms.
2. The present generations should spare future generations the scourge of war. To that end, they should avoid exposing future generations to the harmful consequences of armed conflicts as well as all other forms of aggression and use of weapons, contrary to humanitarian principles.'

— UNESCO, Declaration on Future Generations Article 9

== Economics ==
The financial state of people in future generations is widely debated. However, a study in 2022 revealed that a majority of people believe that the financial state of future generations will be worse than their current state. Adults were interviewed in 19 countries (Japan, France, Italy, Canada, Spain, United Kingdom, Australia, United States, Belgium, Greece, Netherlands, South Korea, Germany, Malaysia, Hungary, Sweden, Poland, Singapore, and Israel), and the adults in almost every country agreed that the financial state of future generations would be worse.

The 19-country median was 70-27-3 (worse-better-same). The Pew Research Center was responsible for conducting the survey.

== Legal rights of future generations ==
Most implementations of future generations focus on enshrining the rights and needs of future generations in law, in order to represent those unable to voice their needs.

Several countries have tried enshrining obligations to future generations in law. In Wales, this moral obligation is encoded as a legal duty in the Well-being of Future Generations (Wales) Act 2015 and in the role of the Future Generations Commissioner. The first commissioner Sophie Howe modeled the role, proposing a number of new policies designed for future-thinking policy in Wales, including a 2020 Manifesto for the Future. Similarly in Hungary the office of the Hungarian Parliamentary Commissioner for Future Generations was established in 2008. While in the United Kingdom, an informal cross-party parliamentary group has been established to discuss issues around future generations.

=== Climate litigation ===
The rights of future generations are increasingly being protected in legal precedents as part of the global trends in climate litigation. Future generations were the defendant in the critical defendants in a 2018 case Future Generations v. Ministry of the Environment and Others in Colombia which protected the Amazon rainforest basin for future generations.

== In popular culture ==
The rights of future generations were the inspiration for the principle plot device in Kim Stanley Robinson's The Ministry for the Future.

== See also ==
- Fiscal sustainability
- Generationism
- Intergenerational equity
- Longtermism
- Pension crisis
- Think of the children
