= Legislation (Wales) Act 2019 =

Act of the National Assembly for Wales

Legislation (Wales) Act 2019 (Note: Section 45.)
- Act of the National Assembly for Wales
- National Assembly for Wales
- Long title: An Act of the National Assembly for Wales to promote the accessibility of Welsh law; to provide for the interpretation and operation of Welsh legislation; and for connected purposes.
- Citation: 2019 anaw 4
- Introduced by: Jeremy Miles AM, Counsel General
- Territorial extent: Wales

Dates
- Royal assent: 29 April 2015
- Commencement: 10 September 2019 (parts 1,3,4); 1 January 2020 (part 2); (Note: Section 44.)

Other legislation
- Amends: Government of Wales Act 2006
- Amended by: Legislation (Wales) Act 2019 (Amendment of Schedule 1) Regulations 2020
- Relates to: Legislation (Wales) Act 2019 (Commencement) Order 2019

Status: Amended

History of passage through the Assembly

Text of statute as originally enacted

Revised text of statute as amended

Text of the Legislation (Wales) Act 2019 as in force today (including any amendments) within the United Kingdom, from legislation.gov.uk.

The Legislation (Wales) Act 2019 (anaw 4) (Welsh: Deddf Deddfwriaeth (Cymru) 2019) is an act of the National Assembly for Wales, which is designed to provide guidance on how to draft and interpret primary and secondary legislation of the Assembly.

== Background ==
In July 2013, the Law Commission announced that it was including a section on the "form and accessibility of the law applicable in Wales" as an advisory project in its twelfth programme of law reform. In 2016, the Law Commission published its final report on the form and accessibility of the law in Wales, recommending

- consolidating and codifying legislation,
- giving guidance on how to standardise "legal Welsh" in such a way it is accessible to Welsh language speakers and giving judges and lawyers training to understand the specific legal terminology in Welsh,
- reducing the amount of legislation that is out-of-date on legislation.gov.uk.
- developing legal textbooks in Welsh
- passing an interpretation act

Lord Lloyd-Jones, a Justice of the Supreme Court of the United Kingdom, wrote a document supporting codification.

The draft bill was introduced to the assembly in April 2018.

=== Dispute with the UK Government ===
In April 2019, the Solicitor General of England and Wales, Robert Buckland, sent the Counsel General for Wales explaining the UK Government's position that certain provisions of the bill were outside of the legislative competence of the Welsh Assembly: mainly relating to Welsh statutory instruments made under acts of the Parliament of the United Kingdom.

In June 2019, the Counsel General sent the Solicitor General, Lucy Fraser a letter explaining the Welsh Government's position that the lack of an interpretation act with provisions for bilingual statutory instruments, made by the Welsh Government under monolingual acts passed by the Parliament of the United Kingdom was problematic.

In August 2019, the Solicitor General, Michael Ellis, sent the Counsel General a letter reiterating the UK Government's position, but explaining that the UK Government would not refer the bill to the Supreme Court.

== Provisions ==
The legislation has provisions:

- a duty to improve and maintain accessibility of Welsh law
- making the English and Welsh language texts of a statute of equal status
- defining how to interpret words and expressions, such as:
  - plurals and singulars
  - gendered pronouns,
  - references to time of day
  - distances
  - grammatical differences
- defining the day on which the service delivered electronically is deemed to be effected
- defining how to use the Act together with the Interpretation Act 1978
- moving the commencement of an act from a commencement order, published separately as delegated legislation, Welsh statutory instruments would now be able to amend the text of the Act itself to insert a date

== Amendments ==
=== Legislation (Procedure, Publication and Repeals) (Wales) Act 2025 ===
Legislation (Procedure, Publication and Repeals) (Wales) Act 2025 (Note: Section 10.)
- Act of Senedd Cymru
- Senedd Cymru
- Long title: An Act of Senedd Cymru to promote the accessibility of Welsh law by making provision about the procedure for making and publishing Welsh legislation, and by repealing certain enactments that are no longer of practical utility or benefit, and connected purposes.
- Citation: 2025 asc 3
- Introduced by: Julie James MS, Counsel General
- Territorial extent: Wales

Dates
- Royal assent: 10 July 2025
- Commencement: 10 July 2025 (sections 9 and 10); 10 September 2025 (rest of act); (Note: Section 9.)

Other legislation
- Amends: Statutory Instruments Act 1946; Agricultural Marketing Act 1958; Rent Act 1977; Planning (Hazardous Substances) Act 1990; Education Act 1996; Government of Wales Act 1998; Countryside and Rights of Way Act 2000; Police and Justice Act 2006; Government of Wales Act 2006; National Health Service (Consequential Provisions) Act 2006; Deregulation Act 2015; Retained EU Law (Revocation and Reform) Act 2023
- Repeals/revokes: Welsh Development Agency Act 1975

Status: Current legislation

History of passage through the Senedd

Text of statute as originally enacted

Revised text of statute as amended

Text of the Legislation (Procedure, Publication and Repeals) (Wales) Act 2025 as in force today (including any amendments) within the United Kingdom, from legislation.gov.uk.

The Legislation (Procedure, Publication and Repeals) (Wales) Act 2025 (asc 3) (Welsh: Deddf Deddfwriaeth (Gweithdrefn, Cyhoeddi a Diddymiadau) (Cymru) 2025) made amendments to:

- formally establish a class of delegated legislation known as Welsh statutory instrument
- formally establish the King's Printer for Wales
- repeal redundant provisions in legislation that have become spent or obsolete

== Other developments ==
The first consolidation act passed as part of the programme to consolidate legislation was the Historic Environment (Wales) Act 2023.

== See also ==
- Welsh statutory instrument
- Act of Senedd Cymru
- Interpretation and Legislative Reform (Scotland) Act 2010
