= NHS Redress (Wales) Measure 2008 =

Measure of the National Assembly for Wales

- Measure of the National Assembly for Wales
- National Assembly for Wales
- Long title: A Measure of the National Assembly for Wales to make provision about arrangements for redress in relation to liability in tort in connection with services provided as part of the health service in Wales; and for connected purposes.
- Citation: 2008 nawm 1
- Introduced by: Edwina Hart AM

Dates
- Royal approval: 9 July 2008
- Commencement: 7 February 2011

Status: Current legislation

History of passage through the Assembly

Text of statute as originally enacted

Text of the NHS Redress (Wales) Measure 2008 as in force today (including any amendments) within the United Kingdom, from legislation.gov.uk.

The NHS Redress (Wales) Measure 2008 (nawm 1) (Welsh: Mesur Gwneud Iawn am Gamweddau'r GIG (Cymru) 2008) is the first piece of primary legislation passed by the Welsh Assembly with its greater law-making powers in the wake of the Government of Wales Act 2006. It was passed by the Welsh Assembly on 6 May 2008 and became law on 9 July 2008 when the Queen approved it through an order in Council of the Privy Council. The measure allows Welsh Ministers to make regulations to specify how it would work in practice.

== Context ==
Assembly Presiding Officer Dafydd Elis-Thomas said that "[t]he passing of the first assembly measure into law heralds a burgeoning confidence in the new law-making constitution of Wales," and called the measure a "historic milestone for Wales and the National Assembly for Wales".

== Provisions ==
The primary aim of the legislation is to reform the law of tort in respect of the National Health Service in Wales, so that complaints be handled out of court. The measure makes investigations must be conducted on agreed lines and agreed timescales.
