= List of acts of Senedd Cymru from 2026 =

This is a list of acts of Senedd Cymru passed in 2026. Acts of Senedd Cymru are enacted by Senedd Cymru (the Welsh Parliament; or simply the Senedd), which has legislative authority over devolved matters in relation to Wales under the authority of the Government of Wales Act 2006.

All legislation passed by the Senedd is bilingual, with the English and Welsh texts being equally authoritative. Acts are cited by calendar year, in the same fashion as acts of Parliament of the United Kingdom. Each act passed in a respective year is numbered consecutively with Arabic numerals, following the prefix "asc" (or, in Welsh, "dsc").

11 acts of Senedd Cymru have so far been passed in 2026.

indicates that an act has been transcribed on Wikisource, indicates that an act is available to view at legislation.gov.uk, and indicates the location of the original act in the National Library of Wales.

== Acts of Senedd Cymru ==
Short title	Citation	Royal assent
Long title
Mental Health Review Tribunal for Wales (Membership) Act 2026; Deddf Tribiwnlys Adolygu Iechyd Meddwl Cymru (Aelodaeth) 2026	2026 asc 1; 2026 dsc 1	21 January 2026
An Act of Senedd Cymru to change the criterion for medical membership of the Mental Health Review Tribunal for Wales; and‍ for connected purposes. Deddf gan Senedd Cymru i newid y maen prawf ar gyfer aelodaeth feddygol o Dribiwnlys Adolygu Iechyd Meddwl Cymru; ac‍ at ddibenion cysylltiedig.
Bus Services (Wales) Act 2026; Deddf Gwasanaethau Bysiau (Cymru) 2026	2026 asc 2; 2026 dsc 2	2 February 2026
An Act of Senedd Cymru to make provision in connection with the regulation and provision of local bus services in Wales; and for connected purposes. Deddf gan Senedd Cymru i wneud darpariaeth mewn cysylltiad â rheoleiddio a darparu gwasanaethau bysiau lleol yng Nghymru; ac at ddibenion cysylltiedig.
Homelessness and Social Housing Allocation (Wales) Act 2026; Deddf Digartrefedd a Dyrannu Tai Cymdeithasol (Cymru) 2026	2026 asc 3; 2026 dsc 3	1 April 2026
An Act of Senedd Cymru to reform the law on support to prevent and end homelessness and to reform the law about the allocation of social housing. Deddf gan Senedd Cymru i ddiwygio’r gyfraith ar gymorth i atal a rhoi diwedd ar ddigartrefedd ac i ddiwygio’r gyfraith ynghylch dyrannu tai cymdeithasol.
Environment (Principles, Governance and Biodiversity Targets) (Wales) Act 2026; Deddf yr Amgylchedd (Egwyddorion, Llywodraethiant a Thargedau Bioamrywiaeth) (Cymru) 2026	2026 asc 4; 2026 dsc 4	27 April 2026
An Act of Senedd Cymru to make provision about environmental principles and the integration of environmental protection; to establish the Office of Environmental Governance Wales with powers to ensure public authorities’ compliance with environmental law; to make provision for the setting of biodiversity targets; and for connected purposes. Deddf gan Senedd Cymru i wneud darpariaeth ynghylch egwyddorion amgylcheddol ac integreiddio diogelu’r amgylchedd; i sefydlu Swyddfa Llywodraethiant Amgylcheddol Cymru gyda phwerau i sicrhau bod awdurdodau cyhoeddus yn cydymffurfio â chyfraith amgylcheddol; i wneud darpariaeth ar gyfer gosod targedau bioamrywiaeth; ac at ddibenion cysylltiedig.
Building Safety (Wales) Act 2026; Deddf Diogelwch Adeiladau (Cymru) 2026	2026 asc 5; 2026 dsc 5	27 April 2026
An Act of Senedd Cymru to make provision relating to the safety of people in or about buildings containing two or more residential units and of people in or about certain houses in multiple occupation. Deddf gan Senedd Cymru i wneud darpariaeth‍ sy’n ymwneud â diogelwch pobl mewn adeiladau neu o’u hamgylch sy’n cynnwys dwy neu ragor o unedau preswyl, a diogelwch pobl mewn tai amlfeddiannaeth penodol neu o’u hamgylch.
Planning (Wales) Act 2026; Deddf Cynllunio (Cymru) 2026	2026 asc 6; 2026 dsc 6	27 April 2026
An Act of Senedd Cymru to consolidate certain enactments relating to planning. Deddf gan Senedd Cymru i gydgrynhoi deddfiadau penodol sy’n ymwneud â chynllunio.
Planning (Consequential Provisions) (Wales) Act 2026; Deddf Cynllunio (Darpariaethau Canlyniadol) (Cymru) 2026	2026 asc 7; 2026 dsc 7	27 April 2026
An Act of Senedd Cymru to make minor and consequential amendments and repeals of enactments for the purposes of the Planning (Wales) Act 2026 and the Historic Environment (Wales) Act 2023, and for connected purposes. Deddf gan Senedd Cymru i wneud mân ddiwygiadau a diwygiadau canlyniadol a diddymiadau i ddeddfiadau at ddibenion Deddf Cynllunio (Cymru) 2026 a Deddf yr Amgylchedd Hanesyddol (Cymru) 2023, ac at ddibenion cysylltiedig.
British Sign Language (Wales) Act 2026; Deddf Iaith Arwyddion Prydain (Cymru) 2026	2026 asc 8; 2026 dsc 8	27 April 2026
An Act of Senedd Cymru to promote the use of British Sign Language in Wales. Deddf gan Senedd Cymru i hybu’r defnydd o Iaith Arwyddion Prydain yng Nghymru.
Senedd Cymru (Member Accountability and Elections) Act 2026; Deddf Senedd Cymru (Atebolrwydd Aelodau ac Etholiadau) 2026	2026 asc 9; 2026 dsc 9	27 April 2026
An Act of Senedd Cymru to provide for the recall of Members of the Senedd; to require the existence of a Standards of Conduct Committee of the Senedd that includes members who are not Members of the Senedd; to authorise the Senedd Commissioner for Standards to conduct investigations on the Commissioner’s initiative; to amend the power of the Welsh Ministers to make provision by order about the conduct of Senedd Cymru elections; and for connected purposes. Deddf gan Senedd Cymru i ddarparu ar gyfer adalw Aelodau o’r Senedd; i’w gwneud yn ofynnol bod Pwyllgor Safonau Ymddygiad o’r Senedd yn bodoli sy’n cynnwys aelodau nad ydynt yn Aelodau o’r Senedd; i awdurdodi Comisiynydd Safonau y Senedd i gynnal ymchwiliadau ar ysgogiad y Comisiynydd; i ddiwygio pŵer Gweinidogion Cymru i wneud darpariaeth drwy orchymyn ynghylch rhedeg etholiadau Senedd Cymru; ac at ddibenion cysylltiedig.
Development of Tourism and Regulation of Visitor Accommodation (Wales) Act 2026; Deddf Datblygu Twristiaeth a Rheoleiddio Llety Ymwelwyr (Cymru) 2026	2026 asc 10; 2026 dsc 10	27 April 2026
An Act of Senedd Cymru to promote the development of tourism, regulate the provision of visitor accommodation, and establish a directory of visitor accommodation premises. Deddf gan Senedd Cymru i hybu datblygiad twristiaeth, rheoleiddio darpariaeth llety ymwelwyr,a sefydlu cyfeiriadur o fangreoedd llety ymwelwyr.
Prohibition of Greyhound Racing (Wales) Act 2026; Deddf Gwahardd Rasio Milgwn (Cymru) 2026	2026 asc 11; 2026 dsc 11	27 April 2026
An Act of Senedd Cymru to prohibit greyhound racing in Wales. Deddf gan Senedd Cymru i wahardd rasio milgwn yng Nghymru.

== See also ==
- List of acts and measures of Senedd Cymru
