= Mental Health (Wales) Measure 2010 =

- Measure of the National Assembly for Wales
- National Assembly for Wales
- Long title: A Measure of the National Assembly for Wales to make provision about primary mental health support services; the coordination of and planning for secondary mental health services; assessments of the needs of former users of secondary mental health services; independent advocacy for persons detained under the Mental Health Act 1983 and other persons who are receiving in-patient hospital treatment for mental health; and for connected purposes.
- Citation: 2010 nawm 7
- Introduced by: Edwina Hart AM

Dates
- Royal approval: 15 December 2010

Status: Current legislation

History of passage through the Assembly

Text of statute as originally enacted

Text of the Mental Health (Wales) Measure 2010 as in force today (including any amendments) within the United Kingdom, from legislation.gov.uk.

The Mental Health (Wales) Measure 2010 (nawm 7) (Welsh: Mesur Iechyd Meddwl (Cymru) 2010) is a piece of legislation introduced to Wales by Health Minister Edwina Hart for both Health and Social Services. The measure was passed by the National Assembly for Wales on 2 November 2010.

The measure is made up of six parts, aiming to ensure that mental health services support people's individual needs. The measure placed new legal duties on Local Health Boards and local authorities, including:

- Ensuring more mental health services are available within primary care
- That all people who receive secondary mental health services have the right to have a Care and Treatment Plan
- Give all adults who are discharged from secondary mental health services the right to refer themselves back to those services
- Offering every in-patient access to the help of an independent mental health advocate.

== Impact ==
In July 2021, Mind Cymru began researching the impact of the Mental Health (Wales) Measure. They collected data through Freedom of Information requests, StatsWales, and interviews with adults who had experience of trying to access mental health support in Wales.

They found that access to primary mental health services had improved, with Local Primary mental health services (LPMHSS) carrying out an average of 40,000 assessments each year.

Waiting times for children and young people were found to be significantly longer than for adults. The target for seeing children within 28 days of a referral was not met between 2016 - 2021, with 58% of the wait list receiving an assessment sometime after the 28 days.

It was noted that for every ten adult referrals, only six assessments were carried out. This raised concerns that there are possible barriers between referral and assessment.

They found that most people receiving secondary care had valid Care and Treatment Plans, but that as many as 40% did not receive or have access to a copy of their Care and Treatment Plan. Others felt they had been given no involvement in the formation of their plan.

The measure expanded access to Independent Mental Health Advocates, allowing many to access support they would have previously were not eligible for. The updated access allowed those who were detained under the mental health act, and voluntary patients, to access advocacy. These advocates allow patients to have their views known, and help them make decisions in their own care.
