= List of acts of Senedd Cymru from 2025 =

This is a list of acts of Senedd Cymru passed in 2025. Acts of Senedd Cymru are enacted by Senedd Cymru (the Welsh Parliament; or simply the Senedd), which has legislative authority over devolved matters in relation to Wales under the authority of the Government of Wales Act 2006. All legislation passed by the Senedd is bilingual, with the English and Welsh texts being equally authoritative. Acts are cited by calendar year, in the same fashion as acts of Parliament of the United Kingdom. Each act passed in a respective year is numbered consecutively with Arabic numerals, following the prefix "asc" (or, in Welsh, "dsc").

5 acts of Senedd Cymru were passed in 2025.

indicates that an act has been transcribed on Wikisource, indicates that an act is available to view at legislation.gov.uk, and indicates the location of the original act in the National Library of Wales.

== Acts of Senedd Cymru ==
Short title	Citation	Royal assent
Long title
Health and Social Care (Wales) Act 2025; Deddf Iechyd a Gofal Cymdeithasol (Cymru) 2025	2025 asc 1; 2025 dsc 1	25 March 2025
An Act of Senedd Cymru to make provision about the regulation and provision of social care services and health care in Wales. Deddf gan Senedd Cymru i wneud darpariaeth ynghylch rheoleiddio a darparu gwasanaethau gofal cymdeithasol a gofal iechyd yng Nghymru.
Welsh Language and Education (Wales) Act 2025; Deddf y Gymraeg ac Addysg (Cymru) 2025	2025 asc 2; 2025 dsc 2	8 July 2025
An Act of Senedd Cymru to promote and facilitate use of the Welsh language, including by setting a target to increase the number of speakers to at least 1 million by 2050, by setting common reference levels for describing ability, by providing for a national framework and local strategic plans for improving Welsh language education, by introducing a system of categorisation of the Welsh language education provided by schools, by setting Welsh language learning goals for schools to pursue through Welsh language education delivery plans, and by establishing a National Institute for Learning Welsh as a statutory body to support lifelong learning of Welsh. Deddf gan Senedd Cymru i hybu a hwyluso defnydd o’r Gymraeg, gan gynnwys drwy bennu targed i gynyddu nifer y siaradwyr i‍ 1 miliwn, o leiaf, erbyn 2050, drwy osod lefelau cyfeirio cyffredin i ddisgrifio gallu, drwy ddarparu ar gyfer fframwaith cenedlaethol a chynlluniau strategol lleol ar gyfer gwella addysg Gymraeg, drwy gyflwyno system o gategoreiddio’r addysg Gymraeg a ddarperir gan ysgolion, drwy bennu nodau dysgu Cymraeg i ysgolion anelu atynt drwy gynlluniau cyflawni addysg Gymraeg, a thrwy sefydlu Athrofa Dysgu Cymraeg Genedlaethol fel corff statudol i gefnogi dysgu Cymraeg gydol oes.
Legislation (Procedure, Publication and Repeals) (Wales) Act 2025; Deddf Deddfwriaeth (Gweithdrefn, Cyhoeddi a Diddymiadau) (Cymru) 2025	2025 asc 3; 2025 dsc 3	11 July 2025
An Act of Senedd Cymru to promote the accessibility of Welsh law by making provision about the procedure for making and publishing Welsh legislation, and by repealing certain enactments that are no longer of practical utility or benefit, and connected purposes. Deddf gan Senedd Cymru i hyrwyddo hygyrchedd cyfraith Cymru drwy wneud darpariaeth ynghylch y weithdrefn ar gyfer gwneud a chyhoeddi deddfwriaeth Cymru, a thrwy ddiddymu deddfiadau penodol nad ydynt o ddefnyddioldeb ymarferol neu o fudd mwyach, ac at ddibenion cysylltiedig.
Disused Mine and Quarry Tips (Wales) Act 2025; Deddf Tomenni Mwyngloddiau a Chwareli Nas Defnyddir (Cymru) 2025	2025 asc 4; 2025 dsc 4	11 September 2025
An Act of Senedd Cymru to establish the Disused Tips Authority for Wales; to make provision to prevent disused tips from threatening human welfare by reason of their instability; and to make provision for connected purposes. Deddf gan Senedd Cymru i sefydlu Awdurdod Tomenni Nas Defnyddir Cymru; i wneud darpariaeth i atal tomenni nas defnyddir rhag bygwth lles pobl oherwydd eu hansefydlogrwydd; ac i wneud darpariaeth at ddibenion cysylltiedig.
Visitor Accommodation (Register and Levy) Etc. (Wales) Act 2025; Deddf Llety Ymwelwyr (Cofrestr ac Ardoll) Etc. (Cymru) 2025	2025 asc 5; 2025 dsc 5	18 September 2025
An Act of Senedd Cymru to establish a register of persons that provide visitor accommodation at premises in Wales; to grant principal councils the power to introduce a levy on overnight stays in visitor accommodation in their areas; to make miscellaneous amendments to the Tax Collection and Management (Wales) Act 2016; (Note: Tax Collection and Management (Wales) Act 2016 (anaw 6)) and for connected purposes. Deddf gan Senedd Cymru i sefydlu cofrestr o bersonau sy’n darparu llety ymwelwyr mewn mangre yng Nghymru; i roi’r pŵer i brif gynghorau i gyflwyno ardoll ar arosiadau dros nos mewn llety ymwelwyr yn eu hardaloedd; i wneud diwygiadau amrywiol i Ddeddf Casglu a Rheoli Trethi (Cymru) 2016; ac at ddibenion cysylltiedig.

== See also ==
- List of acts and measures of Senedd Cymru
