= Upper House =

An upper house is one of two chambers of a bicameral legislature.

Upper House or The Upper House may also refer to:

== Buildings ==
- Upper House Hong Kong, a hotel in Hong Kong
- Upper House, Melbourne, a residential apartment building in Melbourne, Australia
- Upper House, the Malt House and Little Malt House, a historic building complex in Crickhowell, Powys, Wales

== Other uses ==
- The Upper House, a realm in the fantasy novel series The Keys to the Kingdom

== See also ==
- Lower house
