= Trade Union (Wales) Act 2017 =

Act of the National Assembly for Wales

Trade Union (Wales) Act 2017 (Note: Section 4.)
- Act of the National Assembly for Wales
- National Assembly for Wales
- Long title: An Act of the National Assembly for Wales to make provision about industrial action and trade union activity in relation to the operations of, and services provided by, devolved public authorities.
- Citation: 2017 anaw 4
- Introduced by: Mark Drakeford AM
- Territorial extent: Wales

Dates
- Royal assent: 7 September 2017
- Commencement: 11 September 2017; 8 September 2017 (sections 3 and 4); {{efn Section 4. The Trade Union (Wales) Act 2017 (Commencement) Order 2017.}}

Other legislation
- Amends: Trade Union and Labour Relations (Consolidation) Act 1992
- Amended by: Employment Rights Act 2025

Status: Amended

History of passage through the Assembly

Text of statute as originally enacted

Revised text of statute as amended

Text of the Trade Union (Wales) Act 2017 as in force today (including any amendments) within the United Kingdom, from legislation.gov.uk.

The Trade Union (Wales) Act 2017 (anaw 4) (Welsh: Deddf yr Undebau Llafur (Cymru) 2017) is an Act of the National Assembly for Wales (now the Senedd) governing trade union activity in the public sector in Wales. Chiefly it prevents the use of agency workers during strike action in services that belong to the public sector, as well as overturning a 40% support threshold for strike ballots, restrictions affecting time off for union activities and the taking of union subscriptions directly from pay packets. At the time it was approved in July 2017, Mark Drakeford, Cabinet Secretary for Finance praised the act as "a very significant day" for public services and devolution.

Following the commencement of the 2022–2023 United Kingdom railway strikes the UK government announced plans to repeal legislation that prevents the use of agency workers to replace striking staff during industrial action in England, Scotland and Wales. For any legislation to apply throughout these countries, it would require the Trade Union (Wales) Act 2017 to be repealed, since the 2017 act would prevent the use of temporary staff in public bodies whose responsibility has been devolved to the Welsh Government, such as schools, hospitals and the publicly-owned Transport for Wales Rail. On 27 June 2022, the UK government announced it "intends to legislate to remove the Trade Union (Wales) Act 2017 through primary legislation when Parliamentary time allows, to ensure trade union legislation applies equally across Great Britain".

The Welsh branch of the GMB trade union said that it would fight plans to overturn Senedd legislation, with its political officer Tom Hoyles accusing the UK government of "overstepping the mark", while the Welsh Government described them as "counter-productive and against everything we stand for in Wales" and said they would "resist" plans to overturn the act. Rhianon Passmore a Labour Member of the Senedd, described it as "an attack on Welsh workers", while Plaid Cymru economics spokesman Luke Fletcher called it a "power grab". However, BBC News reported that the 2017 law had been passed before changes to the Senedd's powers had made it clear that industrial relations is a "reserved" matter for Westminster. The UK Government announced plans to repeal the act in June and July 2022. The act was amended by the Employment Rights Act 2025 and As of May 2026 remains in force in Wales.
