= Greyhound racing =

Form of dog racing using greyhounds

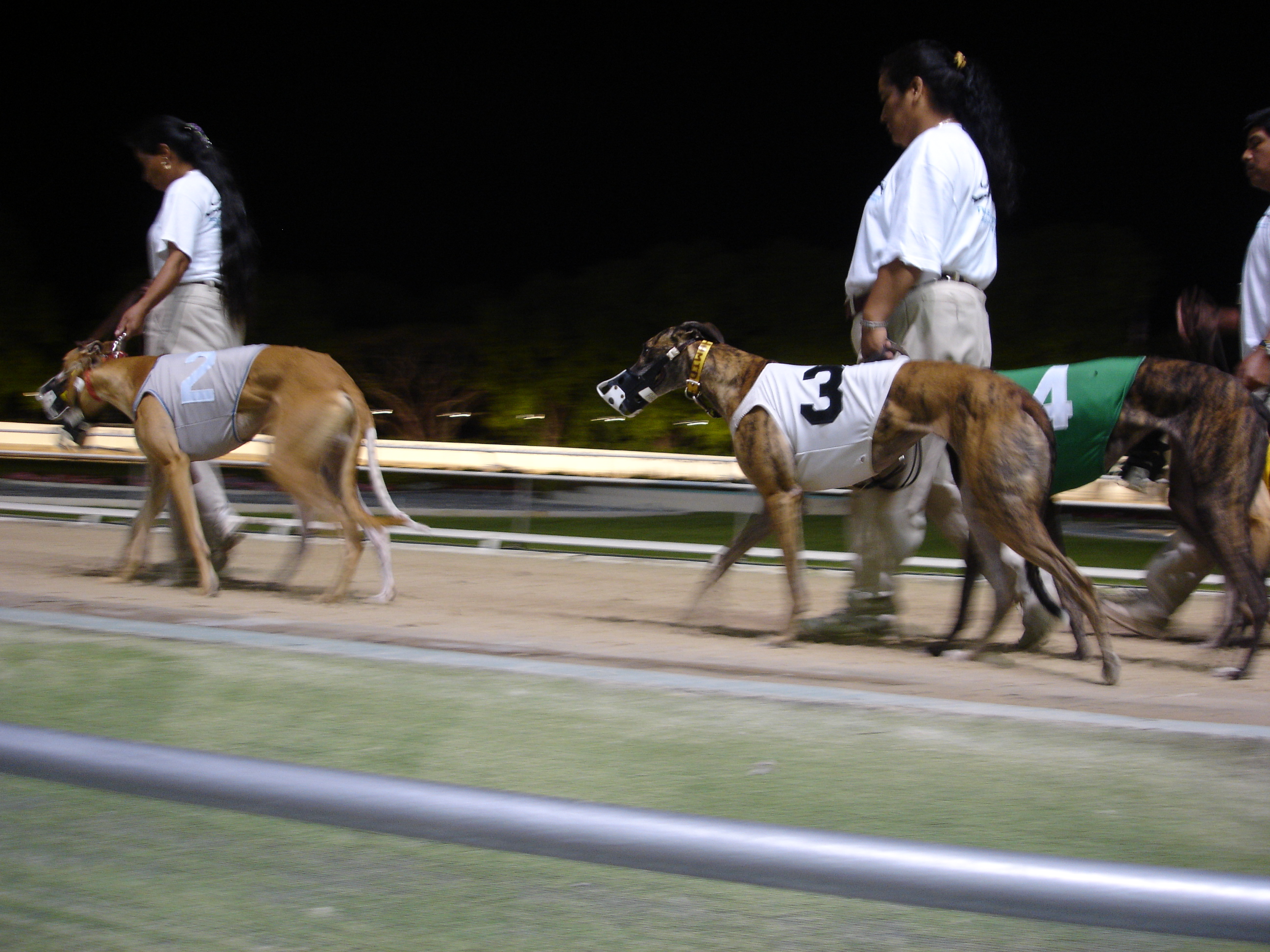
Several greyhounds before a race

Greyhound racing is an organised, competitive sport in which greyhounds race on dedicated tracks. The modern track form of the sport developed from hare coursing and uses a mechanically operated artificial lure (usually a form of windsock) that travels along a rail ahead of the dogs. As with horse racing, greyhound races frequently involve parimutuel or bookmaker betting.

In some countries, particularly Australia, Ireland, the United Kingdom and the United States, it forms part of the commercial gambling industry.

In recent years, greyhound racing has declined in several jurisdictions, with a number of countries and regions introducing bans or phase-outs, often citing animal welfare concerns.

== History ==
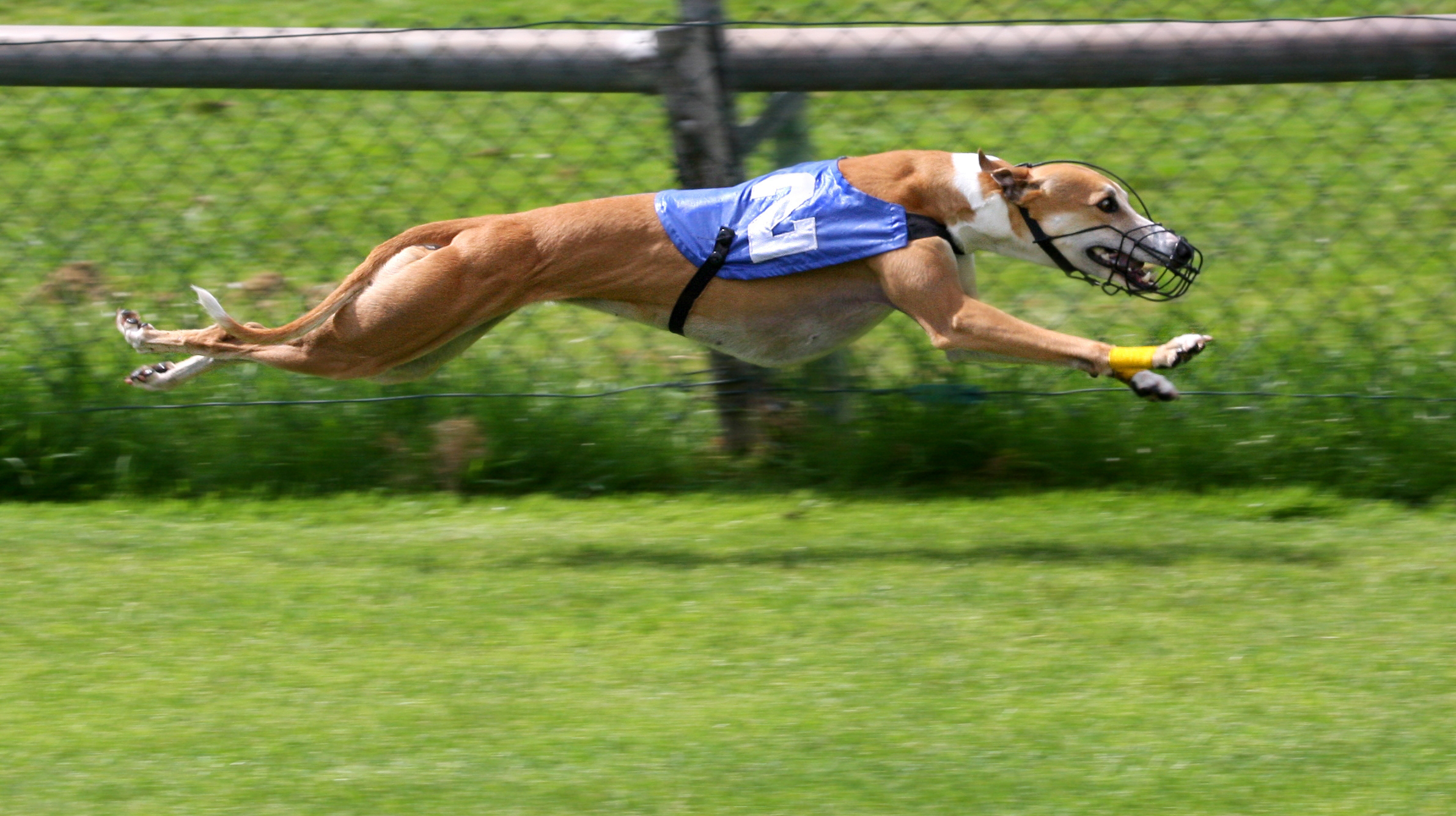
Greyhound on a gallop

Greyhound hurdle race in 1939

Modern greyhound racing has its origins in coursing. The first recorded attempt at racing greyhounds on a straight track was made beside the Welsh Harp reservoir, Hendon, England, in 1876, but this experiment did not develop. The industry emerged in its recognisable modern form, featuring circular or oval tracks, with the invention of the mechanical, or artificial, hare in 1912 by an American, Owen Patrick Smith. Smith had altruistic aims for the industry to stop the killing of the jack rabbits and see "greyhound racing as we see horse racing". In 1919, Smith opened the first professional dog-racing track with stands in Emeryville, California. The Emeryville arena was torn down in February 1920 to make way for the construction of a modern racetrack using the mechanical lure, described in the press as the "automatic rabbit." The first race at the new park was on Saturday, May 29, 1920.

The oval track and mechanical hare were introduced to Britain in 1926 by American promoter Charles Munn, in association with Major Leslie Lyne Dixson (Note: His name appears in variant forms in published sources, including “Lyne-Dixon”, "Lynne Dixon" and “Lynne Dixson”.), a coursing judge. Finding other supporters proved rather difficult, however, and with the General Strike of 1926 looming, the two men scoured the country in an attempt to find others who would join them. Eventually they met Brigadier-General Critchley, who introduced them to Sir William Gentle. Between them they raised £22,000, and like the American 'International Greyhound Racing Association' (or the I.G.R.A.), they launched the Greyhound Racing Association, holding the first British meeting at Manchester's Belle Vue Stadium. The industry was successful in cities and towns throughout the United Kingdom – by the end of 1927, there were forty tracks operating.

The emergence of greyhound racing occurred amid wider reformist opposition to commercial gambling in the late 1920s. The working-class delighted with the emergence in the late-1920s of Greyhound racing as an entertaining new sport and betting opportunity. At first it seemed modern, glamorous, and American, but the middle class lost interest when working-class audiences took over. The working class appreciated the nearby urban locations of the tracks and the evening times of the meetings. Betting has always been a key ingredient of greyhound racing, both through on-course bookmakers and the totalisator, first introduced in 1930. Like horse racing, it is popular to bet on the greyhound races as a form of parimutuel betting.

In recent years animal welfare organisations have raised concerns regarding injury rates, breeding practices, euthanasia of injured or uncompetitive dogs, and post-racing traceability, which had led to reforms, particularly in the United Kingdom with the 'Welfare of Racing Greyhounds Regulations 2010' and Australia with the 'Greyhound Racing Act 2017 No 13'.

== By country ==
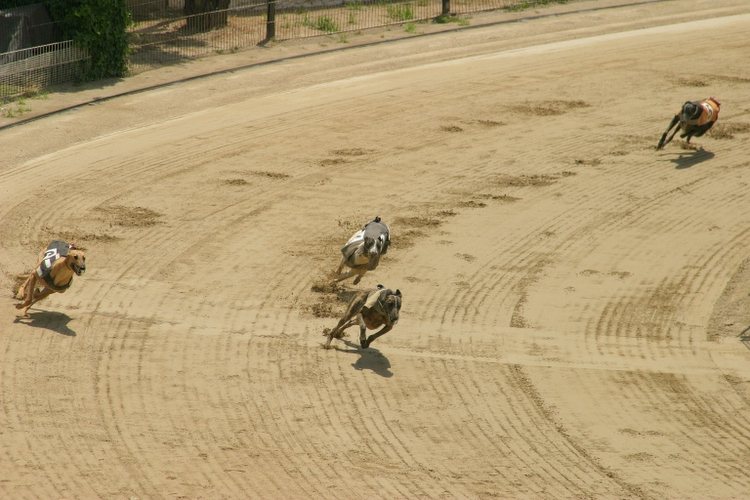
Greyhounds rounding a turn on a track

Greyhound racing is conducted in various jurisdictions worldwide. In some countries it operates as a regulated commercial gambling industry, while in others informal or illegal racing has been reported. Commercial greyhound racing generally involves licensed racetracks and legalised wagering, and is regulated at the state or national level. The structure and scale of the industry vary by jurisdiction. Commercial greyhound racing operates in a limited number of countries.

=== Australia ===
In Australia, greyhound racing is regulated at the state and territory level. The Australian Capital Territory banned greyhound racing in 2018, amid the fallout from the 2015 Australian greyhound racing live baiting scandal, including findings of widespread animal cruelty by a New South Wales special commission of inquiry. In Tasmania, legislation providing for a staged phase-out passed the House of Assembly in 2025, with racing scheduled to end by 2029, subject to final parliamentary approval. Australia has been described as the world's largest commercial greyhound racing industry.

=== Brazil ===
Greyhound racing is banned in Rio de Janeiro and Rio Grande do Sul.

=== China ===
Greyhound racing was held at the Canidrome in Shanghai, built in 1928, where racing ceased during the Second World War and did not resume thereafter. Racing was also conducted at the Canidrome in Macau from 1932 to 1938 and again from 1964 until July 2018. Australia was the primary supplier of dogs to Macau, with large numbers also imported from Ireland. After the operating deadline expired, officials reported that 533 greyhounds had been abandoned at the facility, and the operator was subsequently fined over MOP 25 million under Macau's animal protection law.

Organised greyhound racing has been staged at the Shanghai Wild Animal Park, where a purpose-built track was constructed in 2003 for racing involving imported Australian greyhounds. Investigative reporting has also examined the export of Australian racing greyhounds to China in connection with welfare concerns and unregulated racing and breeding activities.

=== India ===
Greyhound racing was conducted in British India, including in Culcutta (now Kolkata) and Udhna, where race meetings were held in the 1930s and early 1940s and were subject to government regulation, including temporary bans. These activities did not develop into a sustained domestic industry.

A further attempt to introduce greyhound racing was made in Bombay (now Mumbai) in the 1970s, where the Maharashtra government approved licensed greyhound racing events at the Cricket Club of India.

Reports from 2024 to 2026 describe greyhound racing events in Punjab and other parts of the country, including rural races using mechanical lures, with authorities halting or cancelling several planned races following complaints. In August 2025, the Animal Welfare Board of India issued an advisory stating that greyhound racing is illegal under existing law in India, and directing authorities to prevent such events.

=== Ireland ===
Greyhound racing in Ireland is overseen by Rásaíocht Con Éireann (GRI), a commercial semi-state body that operates and regulates the majority of greyhound racing tracks and reports to the Department of Agriculture, Food and the Marine. Northern Irish tracks are treated as part of Irish greyhound racing, with results published by GRI and not governed by the Greyhound Board of Great Britain (GBGB).

Bans on greyhound racing by country and territory Nationwide ban Some subnational bans No ban/no data

=== United Kingdom ===
Greyhound racing in Great Britain is regulated by the GBGB and accredited by United Kingdom Accreditation Service. There are 18 GBGB-licensed stadia in Great Britain, including one in Wales. In 2026, legislative action to ban greyhound racing was taken in parts of the UK, with differing policy positions across its constituent countries.

==== England ====
In February 2025, following the announcement of a greyhound racing ban in Wales, the UK government stated it had 'absolutely no plans' to introduce a corresponding ban in England, citing the sport's cultural and economic contribution.

==== Scotland ====
On 18 March 2026, the Scottish Parliament voted 70 to 27, with 19 abstentions, to ban greyhound racing in Scotland. The ban, contained in the Greyhound Racing (Offences) (Scotland) Act 2026, is to be formally brought into force by the Scottish Government at a later date.

==== Wales ====
On 17 March 2026, the Senedd voted 39 to 10, with two abstentions, to ban greyhound racing in Wales. The Prohibition of Greyhound Racing (Wales) Act 2026 received royal assent on 27 April 2026, and as per section 6 of the act, the ban must be brought into force by the Welsh Government no earlier than 1 April 2027, and no later than 1 April 2030. A legal challenge brought by the GBGB was rejected by the High Court.

=== United States ===
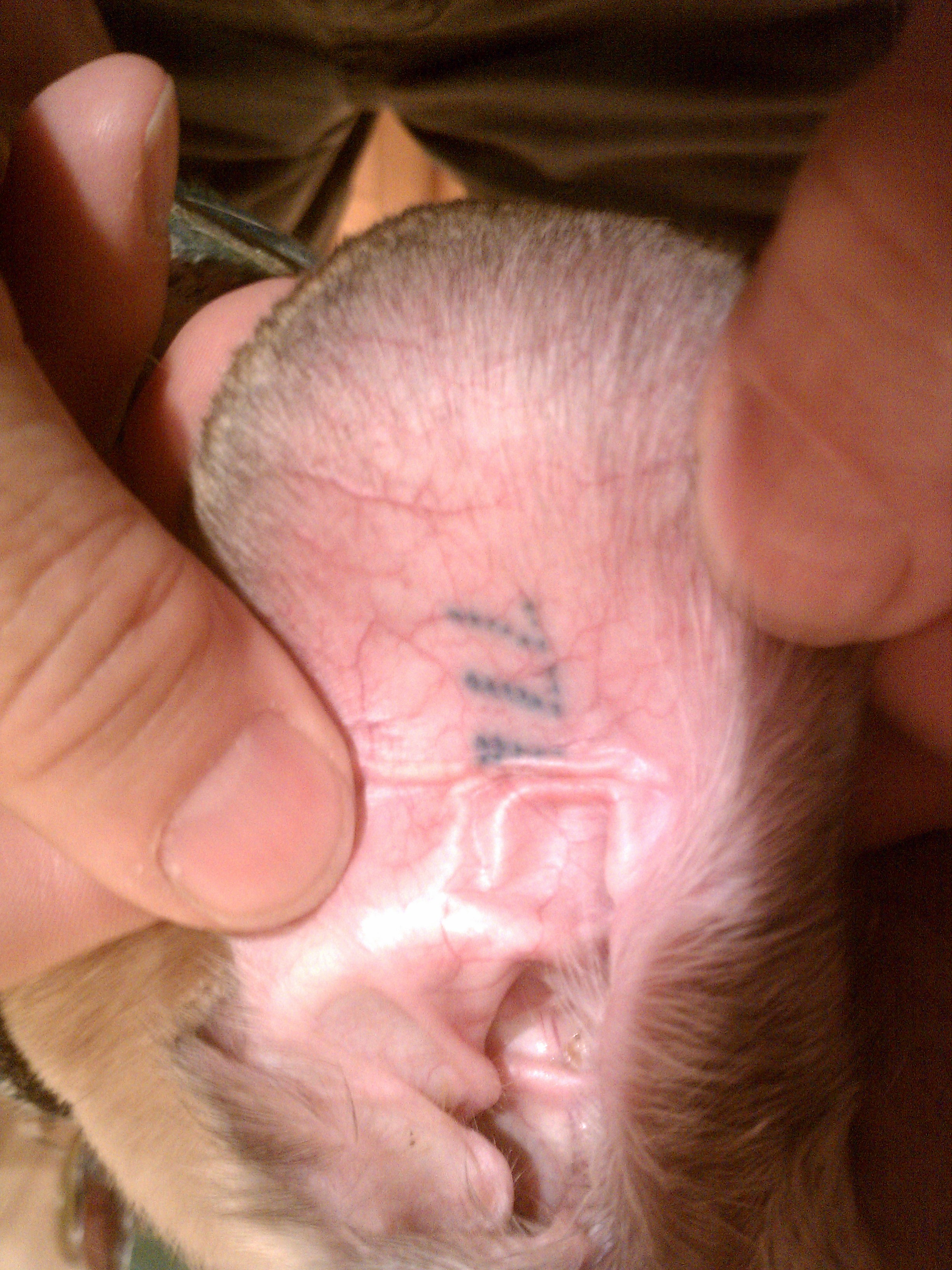
Ear tattoo on an American racing greyhound. Ear tattoos (along with microchips) are used for identification of greyhounds during their racing careers.

In the United States, greyhound racing is regulated at the state level. In 2026, only two racetracks in West Virginia remain in operation. Federal legislation was introduced in Congress in 2025 to prohibit commercial greyhound racing, with 28 co-sponsors from both major parties. In March 2026, the House Committee on Agriculture adopted an amendment incorporating provisions of that legislation into the Farm, Food, and National Security Act of 2026 (H.R. 7567), which would prohibit commercial greyhound racing, simulcast betting on greyhound races (including on foreign races), and related activities nationwide. In April 2026, the House of Representatives passed H.R. 7567, as amended, by a 224–200 vote.

Greyhound registration is administered by the National Greyhound Association (NGA), while welfare and adoption initiatives are coordinated by the American Greyhound Council.

=== Vietnam ===
Greyhound racing operated at Lam Son Stadium in Vung Tau from 2000 to March 2023. The track was established by Dr John Newell, a former chief veterinarian of Greyhound Racing NSW, and later received Australian greyhounds exported for racing. In 2025, the government approved a new greyhound and horse racing complex in Lam Dong Province.

== Former locations ==
=== Argentina ===
Greyhound racing was widespread in Argentina prior to its prohibition, with racing occurring across multiple provinces under varying regulatory arrangements. It formally ended in November 2016, when the National Congress enacted Law 27.330, which prohibits the organisation, promotion or holding of dog races throughout the national territory and provides for criminal penalties including imprisonment and fines.

=== Mexico ===
There was one greyhound racing track in Mexico, the Caliente Hipodrome in Tijuana, that hosted races from 1947 to July 14, 2024.

=== New Zealand ===
Greyhound racing in New Zealand was formerly administered by Greyhound Racing New Zealand (GRNZ) under the Racing Industry Act 2020. On 10 December 2024, Minister for Racing Winston Peters announced that the sport would be banned, citing animal welfare concerns. The ban provides for a phased closure over 20 months to allow for the rehoming of an estimated 2,900 racing dogs, with the final race to occur no later than July 2026. The legislation to implement the ban passed its second reading unopposed in March 2026, with the government citing persistently high injury rates in the industry despite previous reforms.

The ban legislation was enacted in April 2026, and came into force on 1 August 2026, formally ending greyhound racing in New Zealand on that date.

=== Scotland ===
Scotland's last remaining track, Thornton Stadium in Fife, suspended operations in March 2025. On 18 March 2026, the Scottish Parliament passed the Greyhound Racing (Offences) (Scotland) Bill, a Scottish Green member's bill introduced by MSP Mark Ruskell to ban greyhound racing across Scotland. It was approved by 70 votes to 27, with 19 abstentions.

=== Uruguay ===
Greyhound racing was prohibited nationwide by executive decree in 2018, with the Presidency stating the activity involved animal cruelty and illegal gambling. Decreto N° 431/018 bans the holding of dog races of any breed throughout the national territory, with enforcement measures linked to existing animal welfare legislation.

== Retirement ==
A greyhound's racing career typically ends between the ages of four and six when the dog can no longer race or is not competitive. Selected stud dogs and brood bitches may be retained for breeding, while others are rehomed through industry-associated and independent adoption organisations.

In the United Kingdom, the GBGB has introduced measures to record the post-racing location of greyhounds, with records publicly available since 2017.

Approaches to the retirement and rehoming of racing greyhounds vary by jurisdiction. In the United Kingdom, the GBGB introduced the Greyhound Retirement Scheme in 2020, requiring licensed racing greyhounds to be registered with an approved Greyhound Retirement Scheme (GRS) homing centre after racing. In the United States, where commercial greyhound racing has largely ceased, adoption organisations report high rehoming rates for retired racing greyhounds.

== Medical care ==
The medical care of a racing greyhound is primarily the responsibility of the trainer while in training. All tracks in the United Kingdom have to have a veterinary surgeon and veterinary room facilities on site during racing. The greyhounds require microchipping, annual vaccinations against distemper, infectious canine hepatitis, parvovirus, leptospirosis, and a vaccination to minimise outbreaks of diseases such as kennel cough. All greyhounds in the UK must pass a pre-race veterinary inspection before being allowed to take part in that race.

The racing industry (in several countries) actively works to prevent the spread of doping cases. Attempts are being made to recover urine samples from all greyhounds in a race, not just the winners. Greyhounds from which samples cannot be obtained for a certain number of consecutive races are subject to being ruled off the track in some countries. Violators are subject to criminal penalties and loss of their racing licenses by state gaming commissions and a permanent ban from the NGA. The trainer of the greyhound is at all times the "absolute insurer" of the condition of the animal. The trainer is responsible for any positive test regardless of how the banned substance has entered the greyhound's system.

A series of research papers have indicated that the greyhound racing industry played an important role in the rise of drug-resistant hookworms. Greyhound farms tended to treat greyhounds with dewormers even when the dogs did not have an active infection, thus enabling worms, which are constantly exposed to drugs, to develop immunity against the drugs among the surviving worms. The rise of drug-resistant hookworms poses a threat to pets and humans more generally.

== See also ==
- Hare coursing
- Lure coursing
- Fox hunting
- Horse racing
