= Prohibition of Greyhound Racing (Wales) Act 2026 =

Legislation banning greyhound racing in Wales

- Act of Senedd Cymru
- Senedd Cymru
- Long title: An Act of Senedd Cymru to prohibit greyhound racing in Wales.
- Citation: 2026 asc 11
- Introduced by: Huw Irranca-Davies

Dates
- Royal assent: 27 April 2026

Status: Current legislation

History of passage through the Senedd

Text of statute as originally enacted

Text of the Prohibition of Greyhound Racing (Wales) Act 2026 as in force today (including any amendments) within the United Kingdom, from legislation.gov.uk.

The Prohibition of Greyhound Racing (Wales) Act 2026 (asc 11) is a law that was passed by the Senedd to ban greyhound racing in Wales.

The law makes operating, permitting, or organising greyhound racing in Wales a criminal offence.

== Passage ==
The bill was introduced by the Deputy First Minister, Huw Irranca-Davies, on 29 September 2025. It passed in the Senedd on 17 March 2026 and Royal Assent was given on 27 April 2026.

== Debate ==
Wales only has only one Greyhound racing track, the Valley Greyhound Stadium, in Ystrad Mynach. Greyhound Board of Great Britain took the Welsh Government to the High Court over the act. The attempt to stop the act was rejected by the High Court.
