= National Assembly for Wales (Remuneration) Measure 2010 =

- Measure of the National Assembly for Wales
- National Assembly for Wales
- Long title: A Measure of the National Assembly for Wales to establish a National Assembly for Wales Remuneration Board, to transfer to that Board the functions of making determinations in relation to the remuneration of Assembly members, the First Minister, Welsh Ministers, the Counsel General and Deputy Welsh Ministers, and for connected purposes.
- Citation: 2010 nawm 4
- Territorial extent: Wales

Dates
- Royal approval: 21 July 2010

Status: Current legislation

History of passage through the Assembly

Text of statute as originally enacted

Text of the National Assembly for Wales (Remuneration) Measure 2010 as in force today (including any amendments) within the United Kingdom, from legislation.gov.uk.

National Assembly for Wales (Remuneration) Measure 2010 (nawm 4) is a Measure of the National Assembly for Wales that regulates how assembly members are paid. The measure creates an independent remuneration body that makes decisions about AM's pay and expenses.
