= List of acts of the National Assembly for Wales from 2012 =

This is a list of acts of the National Assembly for Wales passed in 2012. Acts of the National Assembly for Wales are acts of Senedd Cymru enacted by Senedd Cymru (the Welsh Parliament; or simply the Senedd) under its former name of the National Assembly for Wales. It has legislative authority over devolved matters in relation to Wales under the authority of the Government of Wales Act 2006. All legislation passed by the Senedd is bilingual, with the English and Welsh texts being equally authoritative. Acts are cited by calendar year, in the same fashion as acts of Parliament of the United Kingdom. Each act passed in a respective year is numbered consecutively with Arabic numerals, following the prefix "anaw" (or, in Welsh, "dccc").

2 acts of the National Assembly for Wales were passed in 2012.

indicates that an act is available to view at legislation.gov.uk, and indicates the location of the original act in the National Library of Wales.

== Acts of the National Assembly for Wales ==
{{legislationuk|act |- | {{|National Assembly for Wales (Official Languages) Act 2012|cyshort=Deddf Cynulliad Cenedlaethol Cymru (Ieithoedd Swyddogol) 2012|anaw|1|12-11-2012|maintained=y|url=deddf-cynulliad-cenedlaethol-cymru-ieithoedd-swyddogol-national-assembly-for-wales-official-languages-act|An Act of the National Assembly for Wales to make provision about the use of the English and Welsh languages in proceedings of the National Assembly for Wales and in the discharge of the functions of the Assembly Commission.|cylong=Deddf gan Gynulliad Cenedlaethol Cymru i wneud darpariaeth ynglŷn â'r defnydd o'r Gymraeg a'r Saesneg yn nhrafodion Cynulliad Cenedlaethol Cymru ac wrth i Gomisiwn y Cynulliad gyflawni ei swyddogaethau.}} |- | {{|Local Government Byelaws (Wales) Act 2012|cyshort=Deddf Is-ddeddfau Llywodraeth Leol (Cymru) 2012|anaw|2|29-11-2012|maintained=y|url=deddf-is-ddeddfau-llywodraeth-leol-cymru-local-government-byelaws-wales-act|An Act of the National Assembly for Wales to make provision for the powers of county councils, county borough councils, community councils and other public bodies to make byelaws; the procedure for making byelaws; the enforcement of byelaws; and for connected purposes.|cylong=Deddf gan Gynulliad Cenedlaethol Cymru i wneud darpariaeth ar gyfer pwerau cynghorau sir, cynghorau bwrdeistref sirol, cynghorau cymuned a chyrff cyhoeddus eraill i wneud is-ddeddfau; y weithdrefn ar gyfer gwneud is-ddeddfau; gorfodi is-ddeddfau; ac at ddibenion cysylltiedig.}} }}
