= List of measures of the National Assembly for Wales from 2010 =

This is a list of measures of the National Assembly for Wales passed in 2010. Measures of the National Assembly for Wales were enacted by Senedd Cymru (the Welsh Parliament; or simply the Senedd) under its former name of the National Assembly for Wales, as part of its legislative authority over devolved matters in relation to Wales under the authority of the Government of Wales Act 2006. It has no longer been possible for the Senedd to pass measures since 5 May 2011, when it was conferred with the power to pass acts of Senedd Cymru (then known as acts of the National Assembly for Wales) following a referendum. All legislation passed by the Senedd is bilingual, with the English and Welsh texts being equally authoritative. Measures are cited by calendar year, in the same fashion as acts of Parliament of the United Kingdom. Each measure passed in a respective year is numbered consecutively with Arabic numerals, following the prefix "nawm" (or, in Welsh, "mccc").

8 measures of the National Assembly for Wales were passed in 2010.

indicates that a measure has been transcribed on Wikisource, indicates that a measure is available to view at legislation.gov.uk, and indicates the location of the original measure in the National Library of Wales.

== Measures of the National Assembly for Wales ==
Short title	Citation	Royal assent
Long title
Children and Families (Wales) Measure 2010; Mesur Plant a Theuluoedd (Cymru) 2010	2010 nawm 1; 2010 mccc 1	10 February 2010
A Measure of the National Assembly for Wales to make provision about contributing to the eradication of child poverty; to provide a duty for local authorities to secure sufficient play opportunities for children; to make provision about arrangements for participation of children in local authority decisions that might affect them; to make provision about child minding and day care for children; to make provision establishing integrated family support teams and boards; to make provision about improving standards in social work for children and persons who care for them; to make provision about assessing the needs of children where their parents need community care services or have health conditions that affect the needs of the children; and for connected purposes. Mesur gan Gynulliad Cenedlaethol Cymru i wneud darpariaeth ynghylch cyfrannu at ddileu tlodi plant; i ddarparu dyletswydd ar awdurdodau lleol i sicrhau cyfleoedd chwarae digonol i blant; i wneud darpariaeth ynghylch trefniadau i blant gymryd rhan ym mhenderfyniadau awdurdod lleol a allai effeithio arnynt; i wneud darpariaeth ynghylch gwarchod plant a gofal dydd i blant; i wneud darpariaeth sy'n sefydlu timau a byrddau integredig ar gyfer cymorth i deuluoedd; i wneud darpariaeth ynghylch gwella safonau mewn gwaith cymdeithasol ar gyfer plant a'r personau sy'n gofalu amdanynt; i wneud darpariaeth ynghylch asesu anghenion plant os oes angen gwasanaethau gofal cymunedol ar eu rhieni neu os oes ganddynt gyflyrau iechyd sy'n effeithio ar anghenion y plant; ac at ddibenion cysylltiedig.
Social Care Charges (Wales) Measure 2010; Mesur Codi Ffioedd am Wasanaethau Gofal Cymdeithasol (Cymru) 2010	2010 nawm 2; 2010 mccc 2	17 March 2010
A Measure of the National Assembly for Wales to make provision for and in connection with the imposition and recovery of charges for the provision of non-residential social care services. Mesur gan Gynulliad Cenedlaethol Cymru i wneud darpariaeth ar gyfer ac mewn cysylltiad â gosod ffioedd ac adennill ffioedd am ddarparu gwasanaethau gofal cymdeithasol dibreswyl.
Red Meat Industry (Wales) Measure 2010; Mesur Diwydiant Cig Coch (Cymru) 2010	2010 nawm 3; 2010 mccc 3	11 May 2010
A Measure of the National Assembly for Wales to make provision about imposing a levy in relation to the red meat industry in Wales, and for connected purposes. Mesur gan Gynulliad Cenedlaethol Cymru i wneud darpariaeth ynglŷn â gosod ardoll mewn perthynas â'r diwydiant cig coch yng Nghymru, ac at ddibenion cysylltiedig.
National Assembly for Wales (Remuneration) Measure 2010; Mesur Cynulliad Cenedlaethol Cymru (Taliadau) 2010	2010 nawm 4; 2010 mccc 4	21 July 2010
A Measure of the National Assembly for Wales to establish a National Assembly for Wales Remuneration Board, to transfer to that Board the functions of making determinations in relation to the remuneration of Assembly members, the First Minister, Welsh Ministers, the Counsel General and Deputy Welsh Ministers, and for connected purposes. Mesur gan Gynulliad Cenedlaethol Cymru i sefydlu Bwrdd Taliadau Cynulliad Cenedlaethol Cymru, i drosglwyddo i'r Bwrdd hwnnw swyddogaethau gwneud penderfyniadau mewn perthynas â thaliadau aelodau'r Cynulliad, Prif Weinidog Cymru, Gweinidogion Cymru, y Cwnsler Cyffredinol a Dirprwy Weinidogion Cymru, ac at ddibenion sy'n gysylltiedig â hynny.
Carers Strategies (Wales) Measure 2010; Mesur Strategaethau ar gyfer Gofalwyr (Cymru) 2010	2010 nawm 5; 2010 mccc 5	10 November 2010
A Measure of the National Assembly for Wales to make provision for and in connection with the publication and implementation of strategies for the provision of information to, and consultation of, carers. Mesur gan Gynulliad Cenedlaethol Cymru i wneud darpariaeth ar gyfer ac mewn cysylltiad â chyhoeddi a gweithredu strategaethau ar gyfer darparu gwybodaeth i ofalwyr ac ymgynghori â hwy.
Playing Fields (Community Involvement in Disposal Decisions) (Wales) Measure 2010; Mesur Caeau Chwarae (Ymgysylltiad Cymunedau â Phenderfyniadau Gwaredu) (Cymru) 2010	2010 nawm 6; 2010 mccc 6	15 December 2010
A Measure of the National Assembly for Wales to make provision in relation to community involvement in decisions by local authorities in Wales whether to dispose of playing fields; and for connected purposes. Mesur gan Gynulliad Cenedlaethol Cymru i wneud darpariaeth ynghylch ymgysylltiad cymunedau â phenderfyniadau gan awdurdodau lleol yng Nghymru a ddylid gwaredu caeau chwarae; ac at ddibenion cysylltiedig.
Mental Health (Wales) Measure 2010; Mesur Iechyd Meddwl (Cymru) 2010	2010 nawm 7; 2010 mccc 7	15 December 2010
A Measure of the National Assembly for Wales to make provision about primary mental health support services; the coordination of and planning for secondary mental health services; assessments of the needs of former users of secondary mental health services; independent advocacy for persons detained under the Mental Health Act 1983 (Note: Mental Health Act 1983 (c. 20)) and other persons who are receiving in-patient hospital treatment for mental health; and for connected purposes. Mesur gan Gynulliad Cenedlaethol Cymru i wneud darpariaeth ynghylch gwasanaethau cymorth iechyd meddwl sylfaenol; cydlynu gwasanaethau iechyd meddwl eilaidd a chynllunio ar eu cyfer; asesiadau o anghenion defnyddwyr blaenorol gwasanaethau iechyd meddwl eilaidd; eiriolaeth annibynnol ar gyfer personau a gedwir yn gaeth o dan Ddeddf Iechyd Meddwl 1983 a phersonau eraill sy'n cael triniaeth iechyd meddwl fel claf mewn ysbyty; ac at ddibenion cysylltiedig.
Waste (Wales) Measure 2010; Mesur Gwastraff (Cymru) 2010	2010 nawm 8; 2010 mccc 8	15 December 2010
A Measure of the National Assembly for Wales to make provision about the destination of proceeds from charges for single use carrier bags; to make provision about targets to be met by local authorities in relation to waste; to make provision about prohibiting or otherwise regulating the deposit of waste in a landfill; to provide for site waste management plans for works involving construction or demolition; and for connected purposes. Mesur gan Gynulliad Cenedlaethol Cymru i wneud darpariaeth ynghylch pen taith enillion o daliadau a godir am fagiau siopa untro; i wneud darpariaeth ynghylch y targedau sydd i'w cyrraedd gan awdurdodau lleol mewn perthynas â gwastraff; i wneud darpariaeth ynghylch gwahardd neu reoleiddio fel arall y weithred o ollwng gwastraff ar safle tirlenwi; i ddarparu ar gyfer cynlluniau rheoli gwastraff safle i weithfeydd sy'n cynnwys adeiladu neu ddymchwel; ac at ddibenion cysylltiedig.
