= Upper House, Melbourne =

Upper House (Carlton)
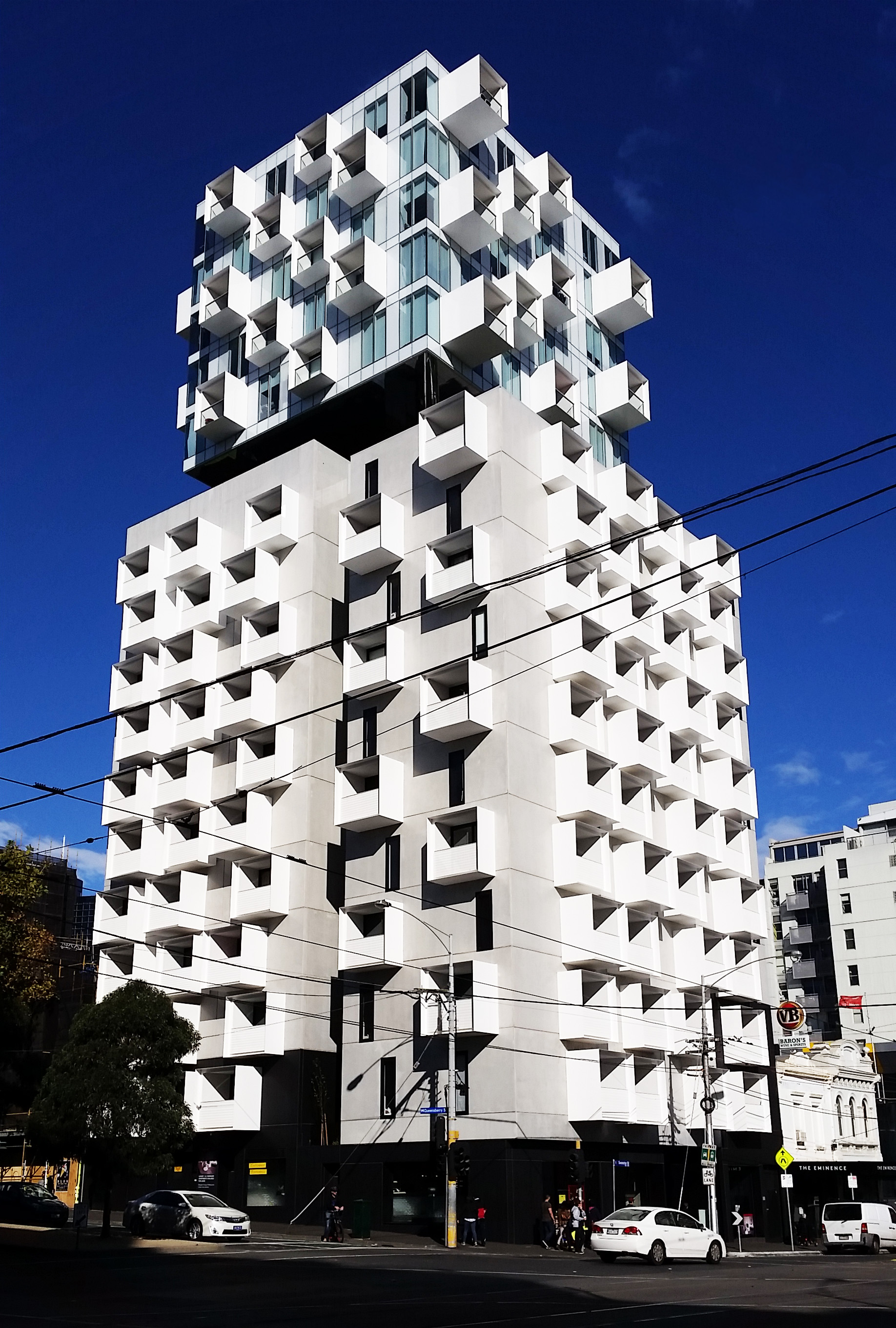
- Upper House showing the distinct extruded balconies
- Interactive map of the Upper House (Carlton) area

General information
- Type: Residential apartment
- Location: 516–520 Swanston Street, Melbourne, Australia
- Coordinates: 37.804807°S 144.963526°E
- Construction started: 2013
- Completed: October 2014
- Client: Piccolo Developments

Height
- Height: 57 metres

Design and construction
- Architect: Jackson Clements Burrows
- Structural engineer: Rincovitch Consultants
- Services engineer: ALA Consulting Engineers
- Other designers: Tim Jackson, Jon Clements, Graham Burrows, Chris Manderson (project architect), Blair Smith, Simon Topliss
- Quantity surveyor: Reddo

Upper House is a multi-residential complex located within Melbourne, Australia, on the south east corner of Swanston and Queensberry Streets in Carlton, known for its unique projected balconies. The building was developed by Piccolo Developments and designed by Jackson Clement Burrows as residential apartment structures. The construction, headed by Hamilton Marino Builders, commenced in early 2013 and was completed in October, 2014.

== Description ==
Made up of two distinct apartment buildings, The Podium and The Cloud, with both offering differing views and floor plans from each other. With a total of 17 storeys, the Cloud apartments on floors 12–16 sit above the Podium apartments which make up the first ten floors, giving the impression of levitation. In the middle of these two structures on the 11th floor is the Observatory, a 500-square metre communal area that comprises a lounge, gym, entertainment area and external outdoor spaces with surrounding views of the city. The Upper House is located on the site of the former Electrical Trades Union building on the busy Swanston Street of the Melbourne central business district. The apartment features 110 units as well as a white façade with cantilevered balconies which extrude out, increasing unit floor space. The ground level of the building features a separate café as well as a lobby area.

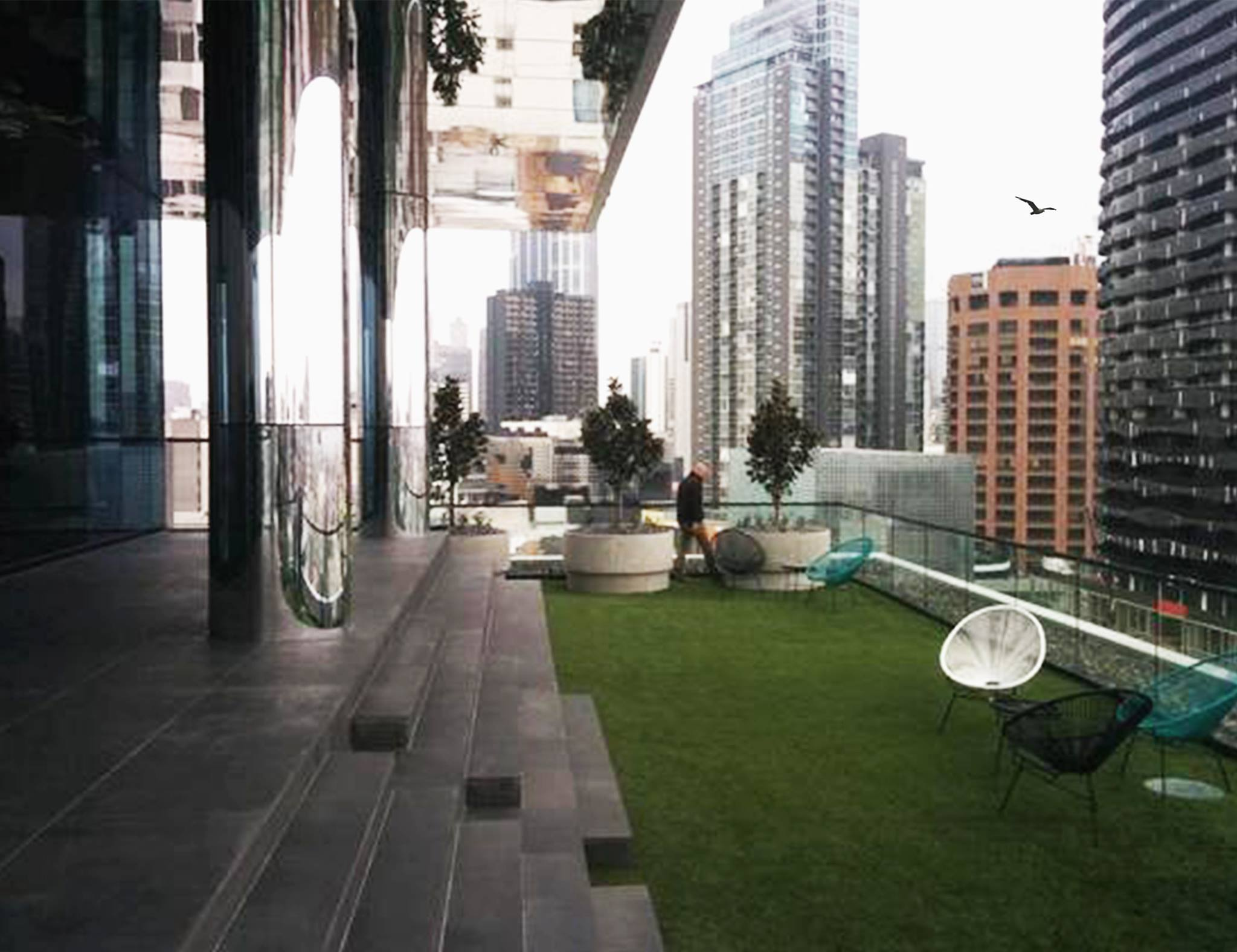
Image of the external outdoor area

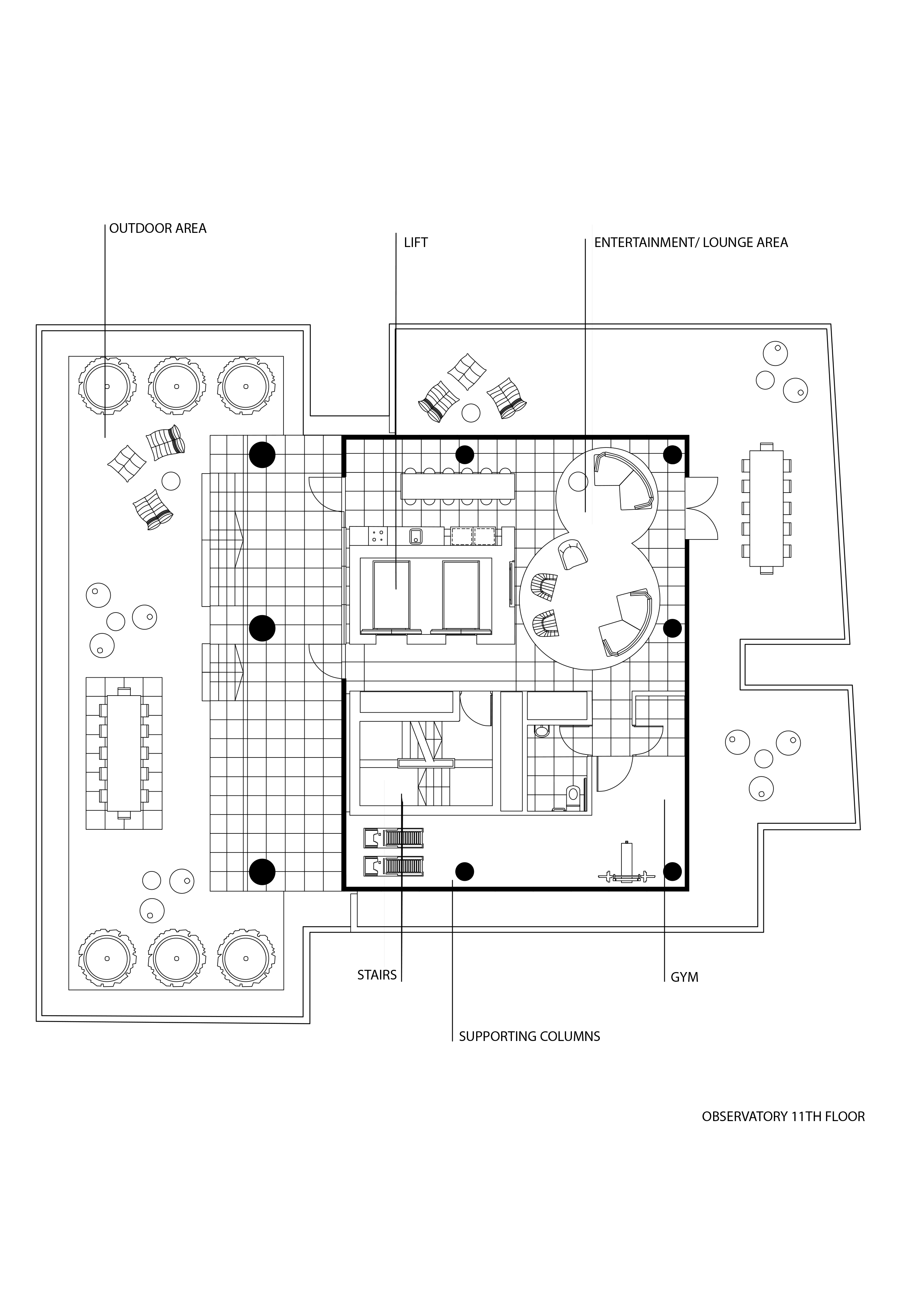
Plan of the Observatory level and its functions

== Design and Systems ==
The Podium and Cloud apartment buildings use various materials accordingly to their characteristics. Pre-cast concrete, white metal balconies and the matte appearance ties the Podium to its urban surroundings, streetscape and city environment whilst the reflective, shiny façade and white curtain wall system of the Cloud emphasises the floating design. The use of mirrors applied to the supporting columns and under croft of the Observatory also highlight the effect of a cloud-like structure. Originally a pre-cast bearing wall design was to be used in the Cloud apartment but the proposal switched over to concrete plates as the load bearing wall design exceeded the requirements significantly. Circular columns are used to support the Cloud apartment, with a transfer beam used on top in order to canter lever the structure. Pre-fabricated and [painted] balconies were sleeved into the openings, projecting over the street with the Cloud's balconies protruding at lengths up to 3 metres. The joinery within each unit which includes the bench, kitchen, table, etc. is pre-fabricated and shipped over from China. Upper House features a single central staircase, despite the unconventional lone staircase, the safety met the Metropolitan Fire Brigade requirements. All of the corridors are smoke vented, with smoke pushed out of louvres during a fire, in addition the corridors are also pressurised and sprinklers cover the entire building.

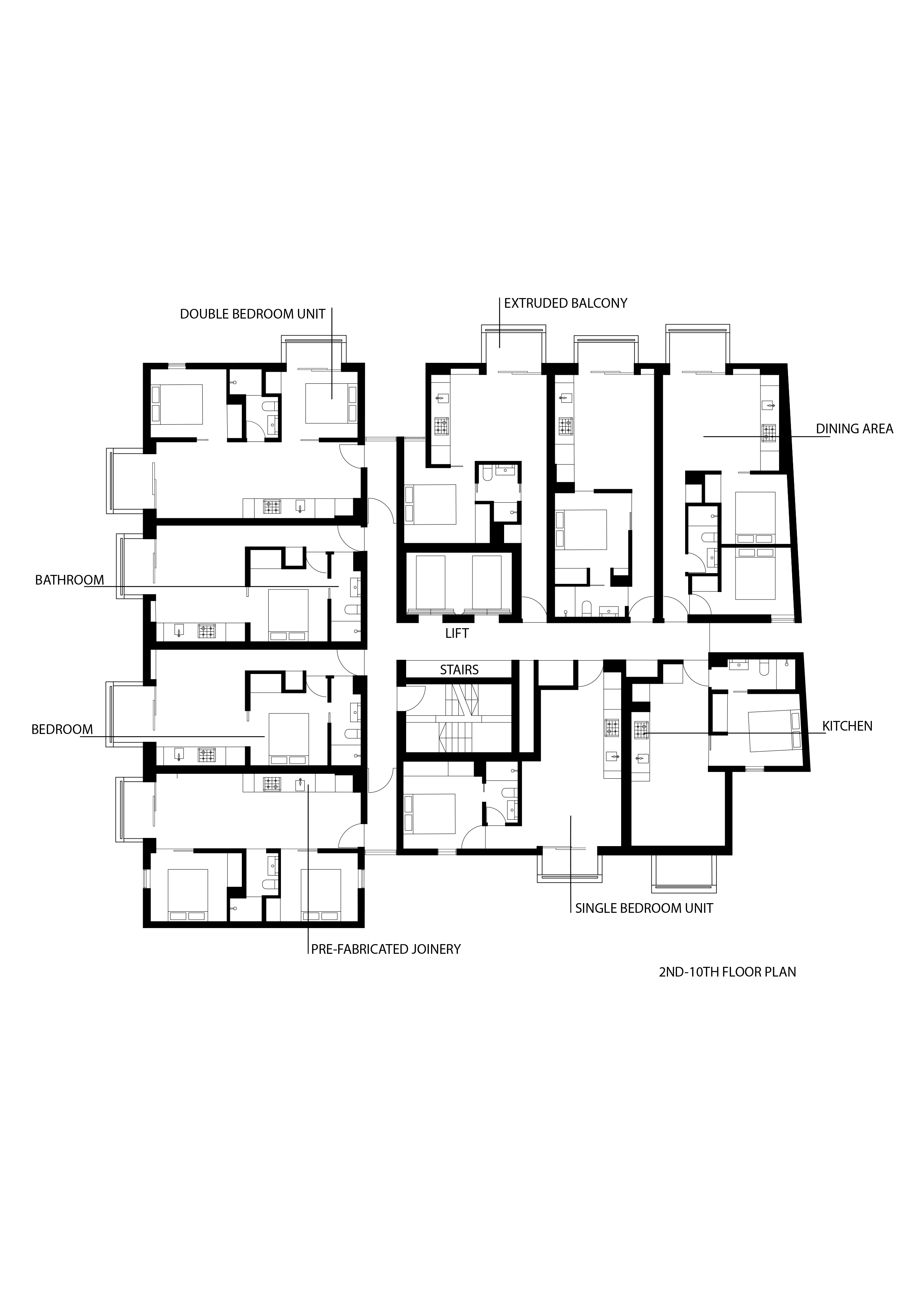
Plan of the Podium floor units

== Key Influences ==
The design for the pattern face of the building originated from steel metal square loops and this is shown through the fabricated steel box balconies making up the façade, appearing to be an extension of the metal loops. In order to keep a similar building skyline of surrounding structures, the Podium apartment consists of 10 storeys, the Cloud was an addition but was designed to appear not to disturb the distinct building skyline.

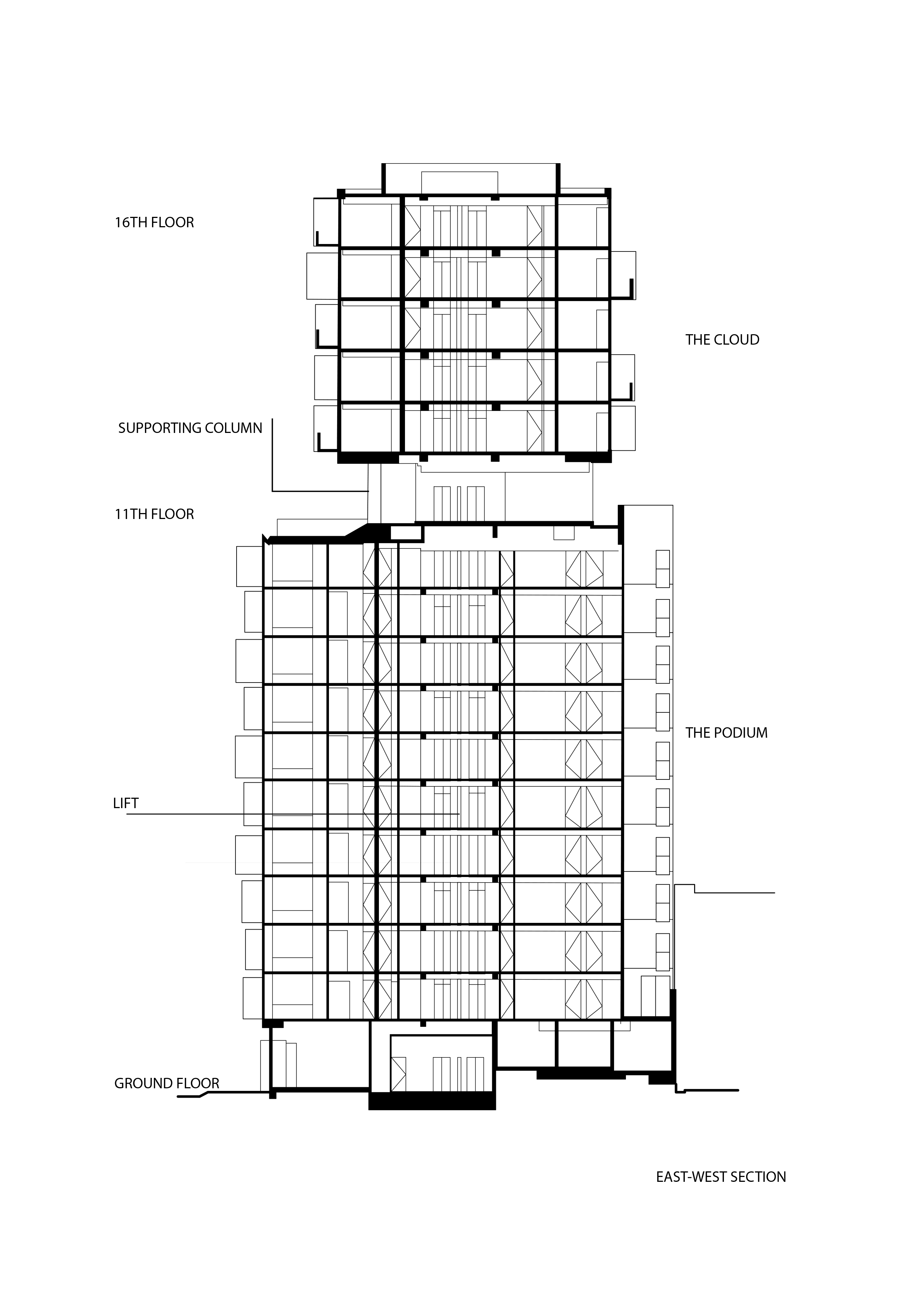
East-West Section

== Restrictions ==
Projected structures are usually not allowed by the councils, however the building developer management negotiated terms with the Melbourne council to lease the air space. This created limits on how far the steel box balconies were allowed to protrude but nonetheless increased the usable floor space of the units. The balconies of the Cloud apartments project out at up to 3 metres in length as they are within the land's boundaries and are not hovering over the pedestrian walk. The Carlton Residents Association also campaigned for the building to not exceed 15 storeys despite the intents for a 19-storey complex, both sides came into an agreement for a total of 17 levels.
