= Well-being of Future Generations (Wales) Act 2015 =

Act of the National Assembly for Wales

Well-being of Future Generations (Wales) Act 2015 (Note: Section 57.)
- Act of the National Assembly for Wales
- National Assembly for Wales
- Long title: An Act of the National Assembly for Wales to make provision requiring public bodies to do things in pursuit of the economic, social, environmental and cultural well-being of Wales in a way that accords with the sustainable development principle; to require public bodies to report on such action; to establish a Commissioner for Future Generations to advise and assist public bodies in doing things in accordance with this Act; to establish public services boards in local authority areas; to make provision requiring those boards to plan and take action in pursuit of economic, social, environmental and cultural well-being in their area; and for connected purposes.
- Citation: 2015 anaw 2
- Introduced by: Jeff Cuthbert
- Territorial extent: Wales

Dates
- Royal assent: 29 April 2015
- Commencement: various (Note: Section 56.)

Other legislation
- Amends: National Health Service (Wales) Act 2006
- Relates to: Government of Wales Act 2006

Status: Current legislation

History of passage through the Assembly

Text of statute as originally enacted

Revised text of statute as amended

Text of the Well-being of Future Generations (Wales) Act 2015 as in force today (including any amendments) within the United Kingdom, from legislation.gov.uk.

The Well-being of Future Generations (Wales) Act 2015 (anaw 2) (Welsh: Deddf Llesiant Cenedlaethau'r Dyfodol (Cymru) 2015) is an act of the National Assembly for Wales that was given royal assent on 29 April 2015; it came into force in April 2016. It set out seven well-being goals:

i) a prosperous Wales,
ii) a resilient Wales,
iii) a healthier Wales,
iv) a more equal Wales,
v) a Wales of cohesive communities,
vi) a Wales of vibrant culture and thriving Welsh language and
vii) a globally responsible Wales.

A 'sustainable development principle' comprising five aspects is intended to assist in the delivery of the act's goals and actions:

i) long-term thinking,
ii) prevention,
iii) integration,
iv) collaboration and
v) involvement.

== Application ==
A Welsh Government animated guide to the law

The act places duties upon the following bodies operating within Wales:

- Welsh ministers
- local authorities
- local health boards
- Public Health Wales NHS Trust
- Velindre NHS Trust
- national park authorities
- fire and rescue authorities
- Natural Resources Wales
- The Higher Education Funding Council for Wales
- The Arts Council of Wales
- Sports Council of Wales
- National Library of Wales
- National Museum of Wales

== Parts ==
The act has five main parts and is supported by four schedules:

- Part 1: Introduction
- Part 2: Improving well-being
- Part 3: The Future Generations Commissioner for Wales
- Part 4: Public services boards
- Part 5: Final provisions

=== Part 1 Introduction ===
Part 1 of the act provides an overview.

=== Part 2 Improving well-being ===
This part of the act sets out well-being objectives for Welsh ministers and a duty on public bodies to pursue them also. It describes how performance towards achieving the goals should be measured and provides guidance.

=== Part 3 The Future Generations Commissioner for Wales ===
Part 3 of the act sets out the role of a Future Generations Commissioner which includes a duty to review and make recommendations and sets up a panel to advise the commissioner. The first commissioner was Sophie Howe, appointed in 2016 to be in post until 2023.

=== Part 4 Public services boards ===
Part 4 of the act establishes public services boards and places a well-being duty upon them. It describes the preparation and review of local well-being plans.

=== Part 5 Final provisions ===
Part 5 of the act defines public bodies in the context of the legislation, and sets out regulations and other ancillary matters.

=== Schedule 1 ===
Annual reports by other public bodies

=== Schedule 2 ===
The Future Generations Commissioner for Wales

=== Schedule 3 ===
Public Services Boards: Further provision

=== Schedule 5 ===
Public Services Boards: Consequential amendments and repeals

== See also ==
- List of acts and measures of Senedd Cymru
