= List of acts of the National Assembly for Wales from 2017 =

This is a list of acts of the National Assembly for Wales passed in 2017. Acts of the National Assembly for Wales are acts of Senedd Cymru enacted by Senedd Cymru (the Welsh Parliament; or simply the Senedd) under its former name of the National Assembly for Wales. It has legislative authority over devolved matters in relation to Wales under the authority of the Government of Wales Act 2006. All legislation passed by the Senedd is bilingual, with the English and Welsh texts being equally authoritative. Acts are cited by calendar year, in the same fashion as acts of Parliament of the United Kingdom. Each act passed in a respective year is numbered consecutively with Arabic numerals, following the prefix "anaw" (or, in Welsh, "dccc").

4 acts of the National Assembly for Wales were passed in 2017.

indicates that an act has been transcribed on Wikisource, indicates that an act is available to view at legislation.gov.uk, and indicates the location of the original act in the National Library of Wales.

== Acts of the National Assembly for Wales ==
Short title	Citation	Royal assent
Long title
Land Transaction Tax and Anti-avoidance of Devolved Taxes (Wales) Act 2017; Deddf Treth Trafodiadau Tir a Gwrthweithio Osgoi Trethi Datganoledig (Cymru) 2017	2017 anaw 1; 2017 dccc 1	24 May 2017
An Act of the National Assembly for Wales to make provision about the taxation of land transactions; to amend the Tax Collection and Management (Wales) Act 2016 (Note: Tax Collection and Management (Wales) Act 2016 (anaw 6)) (anaw 6) to make provision about counteracting avoidance of devolved taxes; to make other amendments to that Act; and for connected purposes. Deddf Cynulliad Cenedlaethol Cymru i wneud darpariaeth ynghylch trethu trafodiadau tir; i ddiwygio Deddf Casglu a Rheoli Trethi (Cymru) 2016 (dccc 6) i wneud darpariaeth ynghylch gwrthweithio osgoi trethi datganoledig; i wneud diwygiadau eraill i'r Ddeddf honno; ac at ddibenion cysylltiedig.
Public Health (Wales) Act 2017; Deddf Iechyd y Cyhoedd (Cymru) 2017	2017 anaw 2; 2017 dccc 2	3 July 2017
An Act of the National Assembly for Wales to make provision for a national strategy on tackling obesity; about smoking; for a register of retailers of tobacco and nicotine products; about the handing over of tobacco and nicotine products to persons aged under 18; about the performance of certain procedures for aesthetic or therapeutic purposes; about intimate piercing of children; about health impact assessments; about assessing the local need for pharmaceutical services; about pharmaceutical lists; about assessing the local need for public toilets; about fixed penalty receipts for food hygiene rating offences; and for connected purposes. Deddf Cynulliad Cenedlaethol Cymru i wneud darpariaeth ar gyfer strategaeth genedlaethol ar fynd i'r afael â gordewdra; ynghylch ysmygu; ar gyfer cofrestr o fanwerthwyr tybaco a chynhyrchion nicotin; ynghylch rhoi tybaco a chynhyrchion nicotin i bersonau o dan 18 oed; ynghylch rhoi triniaethau penodol at ddibenion esthetig neu therapiwtig; ynghylch rhoi twll mewn rhan bersonol o gorff plentyn; ynghylch asesiadau o'r effaith ar iechyd; ynghylch asesu'r angen lleol am wasanaethau fferyllol; ynghylch rhestrau fferyllol; ynghylch asesu'r angen lleol am doiledau cyhoeddus; ynghylch derbyniadau cosb benodedig ar gyfer troseddau sgorio hylendid bwyd; ac at ddibenion cysylltiedig.
Landfill Disposals Tax (Wales) Act 2017; Deddf Treth Gwarediadau Tirlenwi (Cymru) 2017	2017 anaw 3; 2017 dccc 3	7 September 2017
An Act of the National Assembly for Wales to make provision about the taxation of disposals of material as waste by way of landfill; and for connected purposes. Deddf Cynulliad Cenedlaethol Cymru i wneud darpariaeth ynghylch trethu gwarediadau deunydd fel gwastraff drwy dirlenwi; ac at ddibenion cysylltiedig.
Trade Union (Wales) Act 2017; Deddf yr Undebau Llafur (Cymru) 2017	2017 anaw 4; 2017 dccc 4	7 September 2017
An Act of the National Assembly for Wales to make provision about industrial action and trade union activity in relation to the operations of, and services provided by, devolved public authorities. Deddf Cynulliad Cenedlaethol Cymru i wneud darpariaeth ynghylch gweithredu diwydiannol a gweithgarwch undebau llafur mewn perthynas â gweithrediadau awdurdodau cyhoeddus datganoledig a'r gwasanaethau a ddarperir ganddynt.
