= List of acts of the National Assembly for Wales from 2018 =

This is a list of acts of the National Assembly for Wales passed in 2018. Acts of the National Assembly for Wales are acts of Senedd Cymru enacted by Senedd Cymru (the Welsh Parliament; or simply the Senedd) under its former name of the National Assembly for Wales. It has legislative authority over devolved matters in relation to Wales under the authority of the Government of Wales Act 2006. All legislation passed by the Senedd is bilingual, with the English and Welsh texts being equally authoritative. Acts are cited by calendar year, in the same fashion as acts of Parliament of the United Kingdom. Each act passed in a respective year is numbered consecutively with Arabic numerals, following the prefix "anaw" (or, in Welsh, "dccc").

5 acts of the National Assembly for Wales were passed in 2018.

indicates that an act is available to view at legislation.gov.uk, and indicates the location of the original act in the National Library of Wales.

== Acts of the National Assembly for Wales ==
{{legislationuk|act |- | {{|Abolition of the Right to Buy and Associated Rights (Wales) Act 2018|cyshort=Deddf Diddymu'r Hawl i Brynu a Hawliau Cysylltiedig (Cymru) 2018|anaw|1|24-01-2018|maintained=y|url=deddf-diddymur-hawl-i-brynu-a-hawliau-cysylltiedig-cymru-2018-abolition-of-the-right-to-buy-and-associated-rights-wales-act-2018|An Act of the National Assembly for Wales to make provision for the abolition of the right to buy, the right to acquire and associated rights; and for connected purposes.|cylong=Deddf Cynulliad Cenedlaethol Cymru i wneud darpariaeth ynghylch diddymu'r hawl i brynu, yr hawl i gaffael a hawliau cysylltiedig; ac at ddibenion cysylltiedig.}} |- | {{|Additional Learning Needs and Education Tribunal (Wales) Act 2018|cyshort=Deddf Anghenion Dysgu Ychwanegol a'r Tribiwnlys Addysg (Cymru) 2018|anaw|2|24-01-2018|maintained=y|url=deddf-anghenion-dysgu-ychwanegol-ar-tribiwnlys-addysg-cymru-2018-additional-learning-needs-and-education-tribunal-wales-act-2018|An Act of the National Assembly for Wales to reform the law on education and training for children and young people with additional learning needs; and to continue the Special Educational Needs Tribunal for Wales and to rename it the Education Tribunal for Wales.|cylong=Deddf Cynulliad Cenedlaethol Cymru i ddiwygio'r gyfraith ar addysg a hyfforddiant ar gyfer plant a phobl ifanc ag anghenion dysgu ychwanegol; ac i barhau â Thribiwnlys Anghenion Addysgol Arbennig Cymru a'i ailenwi'n Dribiwnlys Addysg Cymru.}} |- | {{|Law Derived from the European Union (Wales) Act 2018|cyshort=Deddf Cyfraith sy'n Deillio o'r Undeb Ewropeaidd (Cymru) 2018|anaw|3|06-06-2018|maintained=y|url=deddf-cyfraith-syn-deillio-or-undeb-ewropeaidd-cymru-2018-law-derived-from-the-european-union-wales-act-2018|An Act of the National Assembly for Wales to make provision for the operation in relation to Wales of law derived from the European Union relating to subjects devolved to the Assembly, in connection with the withdrawal of the United Kingdom from the European Union.|cylong=Deddf Cynulliad Cenedlaethol Cymru i wneud darpariaeth ar gyfer gweithredu o ran Cymru gyfraith sy'n deillio o'r Undeb Ewropeaidd sy'n ymwneud â phynciau sydd wedi eu datganoli i'r Cynulliad, mewn cysylltiad ag ymadawiad y Deyrnas Unedig â'r Undeb Ewropeaidd.}} |- | {{|Regulation of Registered Social Landlords (Wales) Act 2018|cyshort=Deddf Rheoleiddio Landlordiaid Cymdeithasol Cofrestredig (Cymru) 2018|anaw|4|13-06-2018|maintained=y|url=deddf-rheoleiddio-landlordiaid-cymdeithasol-cofrestredig-cymru-2018-regulation-of-registered-social-landlords-wales-act-2018|An Act of the National Assembly for Wales to make provision about the regulation of registered social landlords by the Welsh Ministers and local authorities.|cylong=Deddf Cynulliad Cenedlaethol Cymru i wneud darpariaeth ynghylch rheoleiddio landlordiaid cymdeithasol cofrestredig gan Weinidogion Cymru ac awdurdodau lleol.}} |- | {{|Public Health (Minimum Price for Alcohol) (Wales) Act 2018|cyshort=Deddf Iechyd y Cyhoedd (Isafbris am Alcohol) (Cymru) 2018|anaw|5|09-08-2018|maintained=y|archived=n|An Act of the National Assembly for Wales to make provision about the minimum price for which alcohol is to be supplied in Wales by certain persons; and for connected purposes.|cylong=Deddf Cynulliad Cenedlaethol Cymru i wneud darpariaeth ynghylch yr isafbris y mae alcohol i gael ei gyflenwi amdano yng Nghymru gan bersonau penodol; ac at ddibenion cysylltiedig.}} }}
