= List of acts of the National Assembly for Wales from 2015 =

This is a list of acts of the National Assembly for Wales passed in 2015. Acts of the National Assembly for Wales are acts of Senedd Cymru enacted by Senedd Cymru (the Welsh Parliament; or simply the Senedd) under its former name of the National Assembly for Wales. It has legislative authority over devolved matters in relation to Wales under the authority of the Government of Wales Act 2006. All legislation passed by the Senedd is bilingual, with the English and Welsh texts being equally authoritative. Acts are cited by calendar year, in the same fashion as acts of Parliament of the United Kingdom. Each act passed in a respective year is numbered consecutively with Arabic numerals, following the prefix "anaw" (or, in Welsh, "dccc").

6 acts of the National Assembly for Wales were passed in 2015.

indicates that an act has been transcribed on Wikisource, indicates that an act is available to view at legislation.gov.uk, and indicates the location of the original act in the National Library of Wales.

== Acts of the National Assembly for Wales ==
Short title	Citation	Royal assent
Long title
Higher Education (Wales) Act 2015; Deddf Addysg Uwch (Cymru) 2015	2015 anaw 1; 2015 dccc 1	12 March 2015
An Act of the National Assembly for Wales to make provision about student fees payable to certain institutions providing higher education; to make provision about the quality of education provided by and on behalf of those institutions and about their financial management; and for connected purposes. Deddf Cynulliad Cenedlaethol Cymru i wneud darpariaeth ynghylch ffioedd myfyrwyr sy'n daladwy i sefydliadau penodol sy'n darparu addysg uwch; i wneud darpariaeth ynghylch ansawdd yr addysg a ddarperir gan ac ar ran y sefydliadau hynny ac ynghylch eu rheoli'n ariannol; ac at ddibenion cysylltiedig.
Well-being of Future Generations (Wales) Act 2015; Deddf Llesiant Cenedlaethau'r Dyfodol (Cymru) 2015	2015 anaw 2; 2015 dccc 2	29 April 2015
An Act of the National Assembly for Wales to make provision requiring public bodies to do things in pursuit of the economic, social, environmental and cultural well-being of Wales in a way that accords with the sustainable development principle; to require public bodies to report on such action; to establish a Commissioner for Future Generations to advise and assist public bodies in doing things in accordance with this Act; to establish public services boards in local authority areas; to make provision requiring those boards to plan and take action in pursuit of economic, social, environmental and cultural well-being in their area; and for connected purposes. Deddf gan Gynulliad Cenedlaethol Cymru i wneud darpariaeth sy'n ei gwneud yn ofynnol i gyrff cyhoeddus wneud pethau er mwyn ymgyrraedd at lesiant economaidd, cymdeithasol, amgylcheddol a diwylliannol Cymru mewn modd sy'n gydnaws â'r egwyddor datblygu cynaliadwy; i'w gwneud yn ofynnol i gyrff cyhoeddus adrodd ar weithredoedd o'r fath; i sefydlu Comisiynydd Cenedlaethau'r Dyfodol i gynghori a chynorthwyo cyrff cyhoeddus wrth iddynt wneud pethau yn unol â'r Ddeddf hon; i sefydlu byrddau gwasanaethau cyhoeddus mewn ardaloedd awdurdodau lleol; i wneud darpariaeth sy'n ei gwneud yn ofynnol i'r byrddau hynny gynllunio a gweithredu i ymgyrraedd at lesiant economaidd, cymdeithasol, amgylcheddol a diwylliannol yn eu hardaloedd; ac at ddibenion cysylltiedig.
Violence against Women, Domestic Abuse and Sexual Violence (Wales) Act 2015; Deddf Trais yn erbyn Menywod, Cam-drin Domestig a Thrais Rhywiol (Cymru) 2015	2015 anaw 3; 2015 dccc 3	29 April 2015
An Act of the National Assembly for Wales to improve arrangements for the prevention of gender-based violence, domestic abuse and sexual violence; to improve arrangements for the protection of victims of such abuse and violence; to improve support for people affected by such abuse and violence; and to require the appointment of a National Adviser on gender-based violence, domestic abuse and sexual violence. Deddf gan Gynulliad Cenedlaethol Cymru i wella trefniadau ar gyfer atal trais ar sail rhywedd, cam-drin domestig a thrais rhywiol; i wella trefniadau ar gyfer amddiffyn dioddefwyr cam-drin a thrais o'r fath; i wella'r cymorth sydd ar gael i bobl yr effeithir arnynt gan gamdriniaeth a thrais o'r fath; ac i'w gwneud yn ofynnol penodi Cynghorydd Cenedlaethol ar drais ar sail rhywedd, cam-drin domestig a thrais rhywiol.
Planning (Wales) Act 2015; Deddf Cynllunio (Cymru) 2015	2015 anaw 4; 2015 dccc 4	6 July 2015
An Act of the National Assembly for Wales to make provision about national, strategic and local development planning in Wales; to make provision for certain applications for planning permission and certain other applications to be made to the Welsh Ministers; to make other provision about development management and applications for planning permission; to make provision about planning enforcement, appeals and certain other proceedings; to amend the Commons Act 2006; (Note: Commons Act 2006 (c. 26)) and for connected purposes. Deddf gan Gynulliad Cenedlaethol Cymru i wneud darpariaeth ynghylch cynllunio datblygu cenedlaethol, strategol a lleol yng Nghymru; i wneud darpariaeth i geisiadau penodol am ganiatâd cynllunio a cheisiadau penodol eraill gael eu gwneud i Weinidogion Cymru; i wneud darpariaethau eraill ynghylch rheoli datblygu a cheisiadau am ganiatâd cynllunio; i wneud darpariaeth ynghylch gorfodi, apelau a gweithdrefnau penodol eraill ym maes cynllunio; i ddiwygio Deddf Tiroedd Comin 2006; ac at ddibenion cysylltiedig.
Qualifications Wales Act 2015; Deddf Cymwysterau Cymru 2015	2015 anaw 5; 2015 dccc 5	5 August 2015
An Act of the National Assembly for Wales to establish a new body to be known as Qualifications Wales; providing for Qualifications Wales to be able to recognise bodies responsible for awarding certain qualifications in Wales and to approve certain qualifications awarded in Wales and to perform certain other functions; and for connected purposes. Deddf Cynulliad Cenedlaethol Cymru i sefydlu corff newydd o'r enw Cymwysterau Cymru; i ddarparu i Gymwysterau Cymru allu cydnabod cyrff sy'n gyfrifol am ddyfarnu cymwysterau penodol yng Nghymru a chymeradwyo cymwysterau penodol a ddyfernir yng Nghymru a chyflawni swyddogaethau penodol eraill; ac at ddibenion cysylltiedig.
Local Government (Wales) Act 2015; Deddf Llywodraeth Leol (Cymru) 2015	2015 anaw 6; 2015 dccc 6	25 November 2015
An Act of the National Assembly for Wales to make provision for and in connection with a reduction in the number of principal local authorities in Wales and to make other amendments of local government law as it applies in relation to Wales. Deddf gan Gynulliad Cenedlaethol Cymru i wneud darpariaeth ar gyfer lleihau nifer y prif awdurdodau lleol yng Nghymru, ac mewn cysylltiad â hynny, ac i wneud diwygiadau eraill i gyfraith llywodraeth leol fel y mae'n gymwys mewn perthynas â Chymru.
