= List of acts of Senedd Cymru from 2023 =

This is a list of acts of Senedd Cymru passed in 2023. Acts of Senedd Cymru are enacted by Senedd Cymru (the Welsh Parliament; or simply the Senedd), which has legislative authority over devolved matters in relation to Wales under the authority of the Government of Wales Act 2006. All legislation passed by the Senedd is bilingual, with the English and Welsh texts being equally authoritative. Acts are cited by calendar year, in the same fashion as acts of Parliament of the United Kingdom. Each act passed in a respective year is numbered consecutively with Arabic numerals, following the prefix "asc" (or, in Welsh, "dsc").

4 acts of Senedd Cymru were passed in 2023.

indicates that an act has been transcribed on Wikisource, indicates that an act is available to view at legislation.gov.uk, and indicates the location of the original act in the National Library of Wales.

== Acts of Senedd Cymru ==
Short title	Citation	Royal assent
Long title
Social Partnership and Public Procurement (Wales) Act 2023; Deddf Diogelu’r Amgylchedd (Cynhyrchion Plastig Untro) (Cymru) 2023	2023 asc 1; 2023 dsc 1	24 May 2023
An Act of Senedd Cymru to make provision about sustainable development in accordance with a principle of social partnership; about socially responsible public procurement; establishing a Social Partnership Council for Wales; and for connected purposes. Deddf gan Senedd Cymru i wahardd cyflenwi cynhyrchion plastig untro penodol, i alluogi gwahardd cyflenwi cynhyrchion plastig untro ychwanegol, ac at ddibenion cysylltiedig.
Environmental Protection (Single-use Plastic Products) (Wales) Act 2023; Deddf Diogelu’r Amgylchedd (Cynhyrchion Plastig Untro) (Cymru) 2023	2023 asc 2; 2023 dsc 2	6 June 2023
An Act of Senedd Cymru to prohibit supply of certain single-use plastic products, to enable supply of additional single-use plastic products to be prohibited, and for connected purposes. Deddf gan Senedd Cymru i wahardd cyflenwi cynhyrchion plastig untro penodol, i alluogi gwahardd cyflenwi cynhyrchion plastig untro ychwanegol, ac at ddibenion cysylltiedig.
Historic Environment (Wales) Act 2023; Deddf yr Amgylchedd Hanesyddol (Cymru) 2023	2023 asc 3; 2023 dsc 3	14 June 2023
An Act of Senedd Cymru to consolidate certain enactments relating to the conservation of the historic environment of Wales. Deddf gan Senedd Cymru i gydgrynhoi deddfiadau penodol sy’n ymwneud â chadwraeth amgylchedd hanesyddol Cymru.
Agriculture (Wales) Act 2023; Deddf Amaethyddiaeth (Cymru) 2023	2023 asc 4; 2023 dsc 4	17 August 2023
An Act of Senedd Cymru to make provision about sustainable land management; to make provision for and in connection with support for agriculture; to amend the Agricultural Holdings Act 1986 (Note: Agricultural Holdings Act 1986 (c. 5)) and the Agricultural Tenancies Act 1995 (Note: Agricultural Tenancies Act 1995 (c. 8)) in connection with resolution of disputes about agricultural tenancies; to make provision about matters relating to agriculture and agricultural products; to amend the Forestry Act 1967 (Note: Forestry Act 1967 (c. 10)) in connection with tree felling licences; and to amend the Wildlife and Countryside Act 1981 (Note: Wildlife and Countryside Act 1981 (c. 69)) in connection with prohibitions relating to snares and traps etc. Deddf gan Senedd Cymru i wneud darpariaeth am reoli tir yn gynaliadwy; i wneud darpariaeth sydd a wnelo â chymorth ar gyfer amaethyddiaeth ac mewn cysylltiad â hynny; i ddiwygio Deddf Daliadau Amaethyddol 1986 a Deddf Tenantiaethau Amaethyddol 1995 mewn cysylltiad â datrys anghydfodau ynghylch tenantiaethau amaethyddol; i wneud darpariaeth am faterion sy’n ymwneud ag amaethyddiaeth a chynhyrchion amaethyddol; i ddiwygio Deddf Coedwigaeth 1967 mewn cysylltiad â thrwyddedau cwympo coed; ac i ddiwygio Deddf Bywyd Gwyllt a Chefn Gwlad 1981 mewn cysylltiad â gwaharddiadau yn ymwneud â maglau a thrapiau etc.
