= Future Generations Commissioner for Wales =

Welsh Government officer

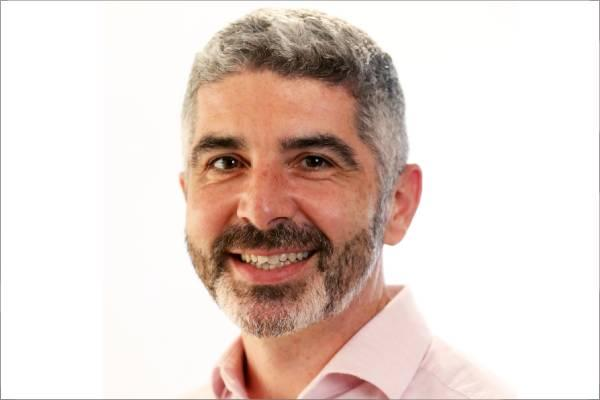
Derek Walker

The Future Generations Commissioner for Wales (Welsh: Comisiynydd Cenedlaethau'r Dyfodol Cymru) is a Welsh Government officer, overseeing an independent advisory body of the same name. The position was created following the passing of the Well-being of Future Generations (Wales) Act 2015, effective on 30 September 2015, with the aim of promoting and facilitating sustainable development.

The current Commissioner is Derek Walker.

== Role ==
A Welsh Government animated guide to the relevant legislation

The Commissioner may do anything they consider appropriate to:

- promote sustainable development through public bodies
- provide advice to the Auditor General for Wales on the sustainable development

== Work ==
The Commissioner's work is politically independent.

=== Advocacy ===
The Commissioner has cooperated with others in a similar role such as the Children's Commissioner for Wales.

== Further developments ==
The role of the Commissioner inspired the Declaration on Future Generations.

== See also ==
- Well-being of Future Generations (Wales) Act 2015
- Sustainable Development Goals
