= Sophie Howe =

Welsh politician and advisor

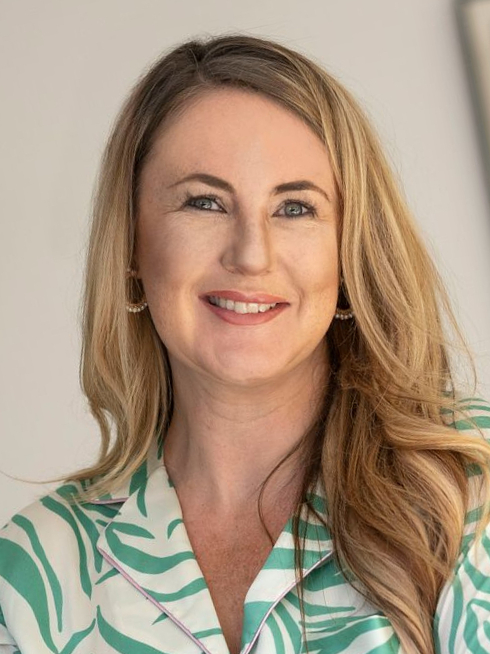
- Official portrait, 2022
- Occupation: Politician
- Known for: First Future Generations Commissioner for Wales

Sophie Howe (born c. 1977) was the first Future Generations Commissioner for Wales from 2016 to January 2023. She had previously been a local councillor and worked as a special political advisor and deputy police and crime commissioner to Alun Michael.

== Career ==
Howe was elected as a local councillor for the ward of Whitchurch & Tongwynlais in 1999 when she was 21, serving for nine years, and initially was the youngest elected councillor in Wales. Howe worked part-time for the Cardiff North MP Julie Morgan while she was at university. She has been employed to manage the legal department of the Equal Opportunities Commission. She was the first deputy South Wales Police and Crime Commissioner and has been special advisor to two First Ministers of Wales. Her areas of expertise lie within communities, local government, equality and community safety.

She was appointed as the Future Generations Commissioner for Wales, a role created as part of the Well-being of Future Generations (Wales) Act 2015 that came into force on 1 April 2016 aiming to make Wales a better place to live. Her term extends to 2023. The remit is a statutory obligation as “the guardian of the interests of future generations in Wales” to provide guidance and advice to the government and public bodies in Wales when they make decisions so that they think about effects on people in the future as well as now. Although formal powers are limited, the power to require justifications for decisions can influence policy. She promotes public involvement, preventative action and cross-government collaboration to improve decision making.

Howe advised the Welsh government against building a bypass around Newport linked to the M4 motorway because it would result in financial debt for the future as well as destroy local biodiversity.

In 2019 Howe introduced a policy of paid leave for staff in her office experiencing domestic abuse. This policy was later adopted by the Welsh government and also a local authority. In 2020 she went further to provide financial support for staff when leaving an abusive relationship in the form of a salary advance, loan or small grant.

In October 2020 Howe initiated a Manifesto for the Future study into providing a basic income for all citizens in parallel with a shorter working week as a response to unemployment caused by the COVID-19 pandemic. These were already recommended in an earlier report she had published in March 2020. She subsequently said that a universal basic income and a shorter working week should be piloted by the next Welsh Government. Her list of suggestions also recommends an emphasis on green policies. These recommendations came ahead of the 2021 Senedd election, to elect members of the Senedd, and the next Welsh Government. In January 2023 Howe completed her term as Future Generations Commissioner and the role was passed to Derek Walker.

Howe has talked about the Well-being of Future Generations (Wales) Act 2015 at events as diverse as the literary Hay Festival in 2019 and when meeting with Housing Women Cymru.

She is a fellow of Swansea University and honorary research fellow at Cardiff Business School in Cardiff University.

In 2023 Howe was appointed to communications agency Lynn Group as its global strategic partner.

== Awards ==
Howe was awarded an honorary doctorate by the University of Wales Trinity Saint David in July 2019.

In November 2020 she was included in the BBC Radio 4 Woman's Hour Power list 2020.

== Controversies ==
Howe was one of four candidates on a Labour party shortlist for the Cardiff North constituency at the 2015 general election for the UK parliament. This was described as a potential conflict of interest with her then post of Deputy Police and Crime Commissioner by Judith Woodman, the Liberal Democrat group leader on Cardiff Council, who said: “If she is going to stand as an MP, then she should stand down as Deputy PCC as I believe there will be a conflict of interest. She is party to information in relation to policing which will probably give her an advantage over any other candidates who wish to raise an issue of policing and crime."

Howe took a total of 50 flights during her seven years in the role of Future Generations Commissioner for Wales, totalling 100,000 air miles, according to evidence which emerged from an FOI request by Wales Online. In the words of the newspaper, Howe, "whose role is to hold public bodies and politicians and the long-term impact their decisions have to account", took trips to Paris, New York, Hamburg, Vienna, Toronto, Oslo, Seoul, Sharm el Sheik in Egypt and Dubai.

== Personal life ==
Howe was born around 1977 and lived in Ely, Cardiff. She attended school in Rhiwbina. Her parents were active in local politics. She studied law and politics at university. She now lives in Cardiff and is married to Ceri Lovett. Their first child was born while they were in their final year at university. They have five children.
