= List of acts of the National Assembly for Wales from 2019 =

This is a list of acts of the National Assembly for Wales passed in 2019. Acts of the National Assembly for Wales are acts of Senedd Cymru enacted by Senedd Cymru (the Welsh Parliament; or simply the Senedd) under its former name of the National Assembly for Wales. It has legislative authority over devolved matters in relation to Wales under the authority of the Government of Wales Act 2006. All legislation passed by the Senedd is bilingual, with the English and Welsh texts being equally authoritative. Acts are cited by calendar year, in the same fashion as acts of Parliament of the United Kingdom. Each act passed in a respective year is numbered consecutively with Arabic numerals, following the prefix "anaw" (or, in Welsh, "dccc").

4 acts of the National Assembly for Wales were passed in 2019.

indicates that an act is available to view at legislation.gov.uk, and indicates the location of the original act in the National Library of Wales.

== Acts of the National Assembly for Wales ==
{{legislationuk|act |- | {{|Childcare Funding (Wales) Act 2019|cyshort=Deddf Cyllido Gofal Plant (Cymru) 2019|anaw|1|30-01-2019|maintained=y|archived=n|An Act of the National Assembly for Wales to make provision for the funding by the Welsh Ministers of childcare for children of working parents; and for connected purposes.|cylong=Deddf Cynulliad Cenedlaethol Cymru i wneud darpariaeth ar gyfer cyllido gofal plant gan Weinidogion Cymru ar gyfer plant rhieni sy'n gweithio; ac at ddibenion cysylltiedig.}} |- | {{|Renting Homes (Fees etc.) (Wales) Act 2019|cyshort=Deddf Rhentu Cartrefi (Ffioedd etc.) (Cymru) 2019|anaw|2|15-05-2019|maintained=y|archived=n|An Act of the National Assembly for Wales prohibiting persons from requiring certain payments to be made or certain other steps to be taken in consideration of the grant, renewal or continuance of a standard occupation contract, or pursuant to a term of a standard occupation contract; to make provision about holding deposits and in relation to requirements to publicise certain fees charged by letting agents; and for connected purposes.|cylong=Deddf Cynulliad Cenedlaethol Cymru sy'n gwahardd personau rhag ei gwneud yn ofynnol i daliadau penodol gael eu gwneud neu i gamau penodol eraill gael eu cymryd yn gydnabyddiaeth am roi neu am adnewyddu contract meddiannaeth safonol, neu am barhau â chontract o'r fath, neu yn unol â theler mewn contract meddiannaeth safonol; i wneud darpariaeth ynghylch blaendaliadau cadw ac mewn perthynas â gofynion i roi cyhoeddusrwydd i ffioedd penodol a godir gan asiantiaid gosod eiddo; ac at ddibenion cysylltiedig.}} |- | {{|Public Services Ombudsman (Wales) Act 2019|cyshort=Deddf Ombwdsmon Gwasanaethau Cyhoeddus (Cymru) 2019|anaw|3|22-05-2019|maintained=y|archived=n|An Act of the National Assembly for Wales to make provision about the office of the Public Services Ombudsman for Wales; to make provision about the functions of the Public Services Ombudsman for Wales; to make provision about compensation; and for connected purposes.|cylong=Deddf Cynulliad Cenedlaethol Cymru i wneud darpariaeth ynghylch swydd Ombwdsmon Gwasanaethau Cyhoeddus Cymru; i wneud darpariaeth ynghylch swyddogaethau Ombwdsmon Gwasanaethau Cyhoeddus Cymru; i wneud darpariaeth ynghylch digolledu; ac at ddibenion cysylltiedig.}} |- | {{|Legislation (Wales) Act 2019|cyshort=Deddf Deddfwriaeth (Cymru) 2019|anaw|4|10-09-2019|maintained=y|archived=n|An Act of the National Assembly for Wales to promote the accessibility of Welsh law; to provide for the interpretation and operation of Welsh legislation; and for connected purposes.|cylong=Deddf Cynulliad Cenedlaethol Cymru i hybu hygyrchedd cyfraith Cymru; i ddarparu ar gyfer dehongli a gweithredu deddfwriaeth Cymru; ac at ddibenion cysylltiedig.}} }}
