= List of measures of the National Assembly for Wales from 2008 =

Primary legislation in Wales passed in 2008

This is a list of measures of the National Assembly for Wales passed in 2008. Measures of the National Assembly for Wales were enacted by Senedd Cymru (the Welsh Parliament; or simply the Senedd) under its former name of the National Assembly for Wales, as part of its legislative authority over devolved matters in relation to Wales under the authority of the Government of Wales Act 2006. It has no longer been possible for the Senedd to pass measures since 5 May 2011, when it was conferred with the power to pass acts of Senedd Cymru (then known as acts of the National Assembly for Wales) following a referendum. All legislation passed by the Senedd is bilingual, with the English and Welsh texts being equally authoritative. Measures are cited by calendar year, in the same fashion as acts of Parliament of the United Kingdom. Each measure passed in a respective year is numbered consecutively with Arabic numerals, following the prefix "nawm" (or, in Welsh, "mccc").

2 measures of the National Assembly for Wales were passed in 2008.

indicates that a measure is available to view at legislation.gov.uk, and indicates the location of the original measure in the National Library of Wales.

== Measures of the National Assembly for Wales ==
{{legislationuk|measure |- | {{|NHS Redress (Wales) Measure 2008|cyshort=Mesur Gwneud Iawn am Gamweddau'r GIG (Cymru) 2008|nawm|1|09-07-2008|maintained=y|url=mesur-gwneud-iawn-am-gamweddaur-gig-cymru-nhs-redress-wales-measure|A Measure of the National Assembly for Wales to make provision about arrangements for redress in relation to liability in tort in connection with services provided as part of the health service in Wales; and for connected purposes.|cylong=Mesur gan Gynulliad Cenedlaethol Cymru i wneud darpariaeth ynglŷn â threfniadau ar gyfer gwneud iawn mewn perthynas ag atebolrwydd mewn camwedd mewn cysylltiad â gwasanaethau a ddarperir fel rhan o'r gwasanaeth iechyd yng Nghymru; ac at ddibenion cysylltiedig.}} |- | {{|Learner Travel (Wales) Measure 2008|cyshort=Mesur Teithio gan Ddysgwyr (Cymru) 2008|nawm|2|10-12-2008|maintained=y|url=mesur-teithio-gan-ddysgwyr-cymru-learner-travel-wales-measure|A Measure of the National Assembly for Wales to make provision about the travel of persons receiving primary, secondary or further education or training to and from schools or other places where they receive it; and for connected purposes.|cylong=Mesur gan Gynulliad Cenedlaethol Cymru i wneud darpariaeth ynghylch teithio gan bersonau sy'n cael addysg gynradd, addysg uwchradd neu addysg bellach neu hyfforddiant i ysgolion neu i fannau eraill lle y maent yn cael addysg neu hyfforddiant, ac oddi yno; ac at ddibenion cysylltiedig.}} }}
