= List of Scottish statutory instruments, 2024 =

This is a complete list of Scottish statutory instruments in 2024.

== 1–100 ==
- The Health (Tobacco, Nicotine etc. and Care) (Scotland) Act 2016 (Commencement No. 6) Regulations 2024 (S.S.I. 2024 No. 1 (C. 1))
- The M90/A90/A9000 Trunk Road (Netherley Road, Stonehaven) (Temporary Prohibition on Use of Road) Order 2024 (S.S.I. 2024 No. 2)
- The Non-Domestic Rate (Scotland) Order 2024 (S.S.I. 2024 No. 3)
- The Non-Domestic Rates (Levying and Miscellaneous Amendment) (Scotland) Regulations 2024 (S.S.I. 2024 No. 4)
- The Non-Domestic Rates (Transitional Relief) (Scotland) Regulations 2024 (S.S.I. 2024 No. 5)
- The Sea Fish (Prohibition on Fishing) (Firth of Clyde) Order 2024 (S.S.I. 2024 No. 6)
- The M90/A90/A9000 Trunk Road (Saltoun Place, Fraserburgh) (Temporary Prohibition on Waiting, Loading and Unloading) Order 2024 (S.S.I. 2024 No. 7)
- The Social Security Information-sharing (Scotland) Amendment Regulations 2024 (S.S.I. 2024 No. 8)
- The M80 and M8 Trunk Roads (Monkland Canal Pipeline Access) (Temporary 40mph Speed Restriction) Order 2024 (S.S.I. 2024 No. 9)
- The Council Tax (Dwellings and Part Residential Subjects) (Scotland) Amendment Regulations 2024 (S.S.I. 2024 No. 10)
- The Wine (Miscellaneous Amendment) (Scotland) Regulations 2024 (S.S.I. 2024 No. 11)
- The Official Controls (Import of High Risk Food and Feed of Non-Animal Origin) Amendment (Scotland) Regulations 2024 (S.S.I. 2024 No. 12)
- The United Nations Convention on the Rights of the Child (Incorporation) (Scotland) Act 2024 (Commencement) Regulations 2024 (S.S.I. 2024 No. 13 (C. 2))
- The North East Scotland Trunk Roads (Temporary Prohibitions of Traffic and Overtaking and Temporary Speed Restrictions) Order 2024 (S.S.I. 2024 No. 14)
- The M8 (Newhouse to Easterhouse) M73 (Maryville to Mollinsburn) M74 (Daldowie to Hamilton) A725 (Shawhead to Whistleberry) Trunk Roads (Temporary Prohibitions of Traffic and Overtaking and Temporary Speed Restrictions) Order 2024 (S.S.I. 2024 No. 15)
- The South East Scotland Trunk Roads (Temporary Prohibitions of Traffic and Overtaking and Temporary Speed Restrictions) Order 2024 (S.S.I. 2024 No. 16)
- The North West Scotland Trunk Roads (Temporary Prohibitions of Traffic and Overtaking and Temporary Speed Restrictions) Order 2024 (S.S.I. 2024 No. 17)
- The South West Scotland Trunk Roads (Temporary Prohibitions of Traffic and Overtaking and Temporary Speed Restrictions) Order 2024 (S.S.I. 2024 No. 18)
- The Cost of Living (Tenant Protection) (Scotland) Act 2022 (Saving Provisions) Regulations 2024 (S.S.I. 2024 No. 19)
- The Health and Care (Staffing) (Scotland) Act 2019 (Commencement No. 2) Regulations 2024 (S.S.I. 2024 No. 20 (C. 3))
- The National Assistance (Assessment of Resources) Amendment (Scotland) Regulations 2024 (S.S.I. 2024 No. 21)
- The National Assistance (Sums for Personal Requirements) (Scotland) Regulations 2024 (S.S.I. 2024 No. 22)
- The Road Works (Scottish Road Works Register Fees and Miscellaneous Amendment) Regulations 2024 (S.S.I. 2024 No. 23)
- The Local Governance (Scotland) Act 2004 (Remuneration) Amendment Regulations 2024 (S.S.I. 2024 No. 24)
- The Non-Domestic Rating (Valuation of Utilities) (Scotland) Amendment Order 2024 (S.S.I. 2024 No. 25)
- The Firefighters’ Pension Schemes (Scotland) Amendment Order 2024 (S.S.I. 2024 No. 26)
- The A82 Trunk Road (Spean Bridge) (Temporary Prohibition on Use of Road) Order 2024 (S.S.I. 2024 No. 27)
- The A85 Trunk Road (Comrie) (Temporary Prohibition on Waiting, Loading and Unloading) Order 2024 (S.S.I. 2024 No. 28)
- The Good Food Nation (Scotland) Act 2022 (Commencement No. 2) Regulations 2024 (S.S.I. 2024 No. 29 (C. 4))
- The Sexual Offences Act 2003 (Prescribed Police Stations) (Scotland) Amendment Regulations 2024 (S.S.I. 2024 No. 30)
- The Dangerous Dogs (Designated Types) (Scotland) Order 2024 (S.S.I. 2024 No. 31)
- The A84/A85 Trunk Road (Main Street, Callander) (Temporary Prohibition on Waiting, Loading and Unloading) Order 2024 (S.S.I. 2024 No. 32)
- The A83 Trunk Road (Inveraray) (Temporary Prohibition of Use, Pedestrians and Waiting, Loading and Unloading) Order 2024 (S.S.I. 2024 No. 33)
- The A90 Trunk Road (Stirling to Invernettie Roundabout) (Temporary 40mph Speed Restriction) Order 2024 (S.S.I. 2024 No. 34)
- The Council Tax Reduction (Scotland) Amendment Regulations 2024 (S.S.I. 2024 No. 35)
- The Sandeel (Prohibition of Fishing) (Scotland) Order 2024 (S.S.I. 2024 No. 36)
- The Local Government Pension Scheme (Scotland) (Amendment) Regulations 2024 (S.S.I. 2024 No. 37)
- The National Health Service (Optical Charges and Payments and General Ophthalmic Services) (Scotland) Amendment Regulations 2024 (S.S.I. 2024 No. 38)
- The Ethical Standards in Public Life etc. (Scotland) Act 2000 (Codes of Conduct for Members of certain Scottish Public Authorities) Amendment Order 2024 (S.S.I. 2024 No. 39)
- The Education (Scotland) Act 1980 (Modification) Regulations 2024 (S.S.I. 2024 No. 40)
- Act of Sederunt (Fees of Messengers-at-Arms and Sheriff Officers) (Amendment) 2024 (S.S.I. 2024 No. 41)
- The Packaging Waste (Data Reporting) (Scotland) Amendment Regulations 2024 (S.S.I. 2024 No. 42)
- The National Health Service (Common Staffing Method) (Scotland) Regulations 2024 (S.S.I. 2024 No. 43)
- The Personal Injuries (NHS Charges) (Amounts) (Scotland) Amendment Regulations 2024 (S.S.I. 2024 No. 44)
- The Social Care and Social Work Improvement Scotland (Cancellation of Registration and Relevant Requirements) Order 2024 (S.S.I. 2024 No. 45)
- The Building (Fees) (Scotland) Amendment Regulations 2024 (S.S.I. 2024 No. 46)
- The A68 (Lauder and Jedburgh) A6091/A7 (Selkirk and Hawick) A702 (West Linton and Carlops) Trunk Roads (Temporary 20mph Speed Restriction) Order 2024 (S.S.I. 2024 No. 47)
- The Bankruptcy (Scotland) Amendment Regulations 2024 (S.S.I. 2024 No. 48)
- The A77 Trunk Road (Dalrymple Street, Girvan) (Temporary Prohibition on Use of Road) Order 2024 (S.S.I. 2024 No. 49)
- The A77 Trunk Road (Ballantrae) (Temporary Prohibition on Waiting, Loading and Unloading) Order 2024 (S.S.I. 2024 No. 50)
- The A82 Trunk Road (Spean Bridge) (Temporary Prohibition on Use of Road) Order 2024 (S.S.I. 2024 No. 51)
- The A701 Trunk Road (Heathhall) (Temporary Prohibition on Waiting, Loading and Unloading) Order 2024 (S.S.I. 2024 No. 52)
- The A9/A99 Trunk Road (Latheron) (Temporary 40mph Speed Restriction) Order 2024 (S.S.I. 2024 No. 53)
- The M8 (Newhouse to Easterhouse) M73 (Maryville to Mollinsburn) A8 (Newhouse to Bargeddie) A725 (Shawhead to Whistleberry) Trunk Roads (Temporary Prohibitions of Traffic and Overtaking and Temporary Speed Restrictions) Order 2024 (S.S.I. 2024 No. 54)
- The Non-Domestic Rates (Islands and Remote Areas Hospitality Relief) (Scotland) Regulations 2024 (S.S.I. 2024 No. 55)
- The Regulation of Care (Social Service Workers) (Scotland) Order 2024 (S.S.I. 2024 No. 56)
- The Social Security (Scotland) Act 2018 (Commencement No. 10 and Transitional Provision) Regulations 2024 (S.S.I. 2024 No. 57 (C. 5))
- The Discretionary Financial Assistance (Scotland) Revocation Regulations 2024 (S.S.I. 2024 No. 58)
- The Non-Domestic Rates (Transitional Relief) (Scotland) Amendment Regulations 2024 (S.S.I. 2024 No. 59)
- The Scottish Landfill Tax (Standard Rate and Lower Rate) Order 2024 (S.S.I. 2024 No. 60)
- The Welfare of Farmed Animals (Scotland) Amendment Regulations 2024 (S.S.I. 2024 No. 61)
- The Social Security (Gibraltar) (Iceland) (Liechtenstein) (Norway) (Further provision in respect of Scotland) Order 2024 (S.S.I. 2024 No. 62)
- The Charities (Regulation and Administration) (Scotland) Act 2023 (Commencement No. 1, Transitional and Saving Provisions) Regulations 2024 (S.S.I. 2024 No. 63 (C. 6))
- The South East Scotland Trunk Roads (Temporary Prohibitions of Traffic and Overtaking and Temporary Speed Restrictions) (No. 2) Order 2024 (S.S.I. 2024 No. 64)
- The South West Scotland Trunk Roads (Temporary Prohibitions of Traffic and Overtaking and Temporary Speed Restrictions) (No. 2) Order 2024 (S.S.I. 2024 No. 65)
- The North West Scotland Trunk Roads (Temporary Prohibitions of Traffic and Overtaking and Temporary Speed Restrictions) (No. 2) Order 2024 (S.S.I. 2024 No. 66)
- The North East Scotland Trunk Roads (Temporary Prohibitions of Traffic and Overtaking and Temporary Speed Restrictions) (No. 2) Order 2024 (S.S.I. 2024 No. 67)
- The A96 Trunk Road (Inverness to Nairn (including Nairn Bypass)) (Side Roads) Order 2024 (S.S.I. 2024 No. 68)
- The A96 Trunk Road (Inverness to Nairn (including Nairn Bypass)) (Trunking & Detrunking) Order 2024 (S.S.I. 2024 No. 69)
- The Dangerous Dogs (Compensation and Exemption Schemes) (Scotland) Order 2024 (S.S.I. 2024 No. 70)
- The Local Government Finance (Scotland) Order 2024 (S.S.I. 2024 No. 71)
- The Bus Services Improvement Partnerships (Objections) (Scotland) Regulations 2024 (S.S.I. 2024 No. 72)
- The Provision of Early Learning and Childcare (Specified Children) (Scotland) Amendment Order 2024 (S.S.I. 2024 No. 73)
- The Scottish Social Services Council (Appointments, Procedure and Access to the Register) Amendment Regulations 2024 (S.S.I. 2024 No. 74)
- Act of Sederunt (Rules of the Court of Session 1994 Amendment) (Payment and Electronic Money Institution Special Administration) 2024 (S.S.I. 2024 No. 75)
- Not Allocated (S.S.I. 2024 No. 76)
- The A9 Trunk Road (Almond Bridge) (Temporary Vehicle Width Restriction and Temporary 30mph Speed Restriction) Order 2024 (S.S.I. 2024 No. 77)
- The Consumer Scotland Act 2020 (Relevant Public Authorities) Regulations 2024 (S.S.I. 2024 No. 78)
- The Planning (Scotland) Act 2019 (Commencement No. 13 and Saving Provisions) Regulations 2024 (S.S.I. 2024 No. 79 (C. 7))
- The Police Pension Scheme (Scotland) Amendment Regulations 2024 (S.S.I. 2024 No. 80)
- The Meat Preparations (Import Conditions) (Scotland) Amendment Regulations 2024 (S.S.I. 2024 No. 81)
- The Hate Crime and Public Order (Scotland) Act 2021 (Commencement and Transitional Provision) Regulations 2024 (S.S.I. 2024 No. 82 (C. 8))
- The A830 Trunk Road (Glenfinnan) (Temporary Prohibition of Waiting) Order 2024 (S.S.I. 2024 No. 83)
- Act of Sederunt (Rules of the Court of Session 1994 Amendment) (National Security Prevention and Investigation) 2024 (S.S.I. 2024 No. 84)
- The A82 Trunk Road (Fort Augustus) (Temporary Prohibition on Waiting) Order 2024 (S.S.I. 2024 No. 85)
- The Plant Health (Export Certification) (Scotland) Amendment Order 2024 (S.S.I. 2024 No. 86)
- The Avian Influenza (Preventive Measures) (Scotland) Amendment Order 2024 (S.S.I. 2024 No. 87)
- The Cost of Living (Tenant Protection) (Scotland) Act 2022 (Expiry of Section 10: Extension) Regulations 2024 (S.S.I. 2024 No. 88)
- The Rent Adjudication (Temporary Modifications) (Scotland) Regulations 2024 (S.S.I. 2024 No. 89)
- The Local Authority (Capital Finance and Accounting) (Scotland) Amendment Regulations 2024 (S.S.I. 2024 No. 90)
- The A835 Trunk Road (Ben Wyvis) (Temporary Clearway) Order 2024 (S.S.I. 2024 No. 91)
- The A87 Trunk Road (Eilean Donan) (Temporary Clearway) Order 2024 (S.S.I. 2024 No. 92)
- The M8 (Newhouse to Easterhouse) M73 (Maryville to Mollinsburn) M74 (Daldowie to Hamilton) A8 (Newhouse to Bargeddie) A725 (Shawhead to Whistleberry) A7071 (Bellshill) Trunk Roads (Temporary Prohibitions of Traffic and Overtaking and Temporary Speed Restrictions) Order 2024 (S.S.I. 2024 No. 93)
- The A737 Trunk Road (Beith) (Temporary 30mph Speed Restriction) Order 2024 (S.S.I. 2024 No. 94)
- The North East Scotland Trunk Roads (Temporary Prohibitions of Traffic and Overtaking and Temporary Speed Restrictions) (No. 3) Order 2024 (S.S.I. 2024 No. 95)
- The North West Scotland Trunk Roads (Temporary Prohibitions of Traffic and Overtaking and Temporary Speed Restrictions) (No. 3) Order 2024 (S.S.I. 2024 No. 96)
- The South East Scotland Trunk Roads (Temporary Prohibitions of Traffic and Overtaking and Temporary Speed Restrictions) (No. 3) Order 2024 (S.S.I. 2024 No. 97)
- The Renewables Obligation (Scotland) Amendment Order 2024 (S.S.I. 2024 No. 98)
- The Budget (Scotland) Act 2023 Amendment Regulations 2024 (S.S.I. 2024 No. 99)
- The Community Care (Personal Care and Nursing Care) (Scotland) Amendment Regulations 2024 (S.S.I. 2024 No. 100)

== 101–200 ==
- The Scottish Local Government Elections Amendment (Denmark) Regulations 2024 (S.S.I. 2024 No. 101)
- The Town and Country Planning (General Permitted Development) (Scotland) Amendment Order 2024 (S.S.I. 2024 No. 102)
- The A830 Trunk Road (Morar) (Temporary Clearway) Order 2024 (S.S.I. 2024 No. 103)
- The Land and Buildings Transaction Tax (Miscellaneous Amendments) (Scotland) Order 2024 (S.S.I. 2024 No. 104)
- The Social Security (Up-rating) (Miscellaneous Amendments) (Scotland) Regulations 2024 (S.S.I. 2024 No. 105)
- The Social Security Up-rating (Scotland) Order 2024 (S.S.I. 2024 No. 106)
- The National Bus Travel Concession Schemes (Miscellaneous Amendment) (Scotland) Order 2024 (S.S.I. 2024 No. 107)
- The A85 Trunk Road (Comrie) (Temporary Prohibition on Waiting, Loading and Unloading) (No. 2) Order 2024 (S.S.I. 2024 No. 108)
- The A83 Trunk Road (Lochgilphead) (Temporary Prohibition on Waiting, Loading and Unloading) Order 2024 (S.S.I. 2024 No. 109)
- The Patient Safety Commissioner for Scotland Act 2023 (Commencement) Regulations 2024 (S.S.I. 2024 No. 110 (C. 9))
- The Charities (References in Documents) (Miscellaneous Amendment) (Scotland) Regulations 2024 (S.S.I. 2024 No. 111)
- The Scottish Food Commission (Appointment) Regulations 2024 (S.S.I. 2024 No. 112)
- The Tied Pubs (Scotland) Act 2021 (Commencement No. 1) Regulations 2024 (S.S.I. 2024 No. 113 (C. 10))
- The M77/A77 Trunk Road (Girvan to Lendalfoot) (Temporary 40mph Speed Restriction) Order 2024 (S.S.I. 2024 No. 114)
- The M8 Trunk Road (Junction 26, Hillington) (Temporary 50mph Speed Restriction) Order 2024 (S.S.I. 2024 No. 115)
- The M8 Trunk Road (Junction 15, Townhead) (Temporary 40mph Speed Restriction) Order 2024 (S.S.I. 2024 No. 116)
- The A86 Trunk Road (Spean Bridge to Kingussie) (Temporary 30mph Speed Restriction) Order 2024 (S.S.I. 2024 No. 117)
- The A82 Trunk Road (Fort William to Spean Bridge) (Temporary 30mph Speed Restriction) Order 2024 (S.S.I. 2024 No. 118)
- The Legal Aid (Miscellaneous Amendment) (Scotland) Regulations 2024 (S.S.I. 2024 No. 119)
- The M8 (Newhouse to Easterhouse) M73 (Maryville to Mollinsburn) M74 (Daldowie to Hamilton) A725 (Shawhead to Whistleberry) Trunk Roads (Temporary Prohibitions of Traffic and Overtaking and Temporary Speed Restrictions) (No. 2) Order 2024 (S.S.I. 2024 No. 120)
- The North East Scotland Trunk Roads (Temporary Prohibitions of Traffic and Overtaking and Temporary Speed Restrictions) (No. 4) Order 2024 (S.S.I. 2024 No. 121)
- The North West Scotland Trunk Roads (Temporary Prohibitions of Traffic and Overtaking and Temporary Speed Restrictions) (No. 4) Order 2024 (S.S.I. 2024 No. 122)
- The Plant Health (Import Inspection Fees) (Scotland) Amendment Regulations 2024 (S.S.I. 2024 No. 123)
- The South East Scotland Trunk Roads (Temporary Prohibitions of Traffic and Overtaking and Temporary Speed Restrictions) (No. 4) Order 2024 (S.S.I. 2024 No. 124)
- The South West Scotland Trunk Roads (Temporary Prohibitions of Traffic and Overtaking and Temporary Speed Restrictions) (No. 3) Order 2024 (S.S.I. 2024 No. 125)
- The A86 Trunk Road (Kingussie) (Temporary 30mph Speed Restriction) Order 2024 (S.S.I. 2024 No. 126)
- The Alcohol (Minimum Pricing) (Scotland) Act 2012 (Continuation) Order 2024 (S.S.I. 2024 No. 127)
- The Alcohol (Minimum Price per Unit) (Scotland) Amendment Order 2024 (S.S.I. 2024 No. 128)
- The National Smart Ticketing Advisory Board (Public Services Reform) (Scotland) Order 2024 (S.S.I. 2024 No. 129)
- The Healthcare Improvement Scotland (Fees) Regulations 2024 (S.S.I. 2024 No. 130)
- The Public Services Reform (Scotland) Act 2010 (Commencement No. 8) Order 2024 (S.S.I. 2024 No. 131 (C. 11))
- The A76 Trunk Road (New Cumnock) (Temporary Prohibition on Waiting, Loading and Unloading) Order 2024 (S.S.I. 2024 No. 132)
- The A85 Trunk Road (Comrie) (Temporary Prohibition on Use of Road) Order 2024 (S.S.I. 2024 No. 133)
- The A85 Trunk Road (Comrie) (Temporary Prohibition on Waiting, Loading and Unloading) (No. 3) Order 2024 (S.S.I. 2024 No. 134)
- The A82 Trunk Road (Fort William) (Temporary Prohibition on Use of Road) Order 2024 (S.S.I. 2024 No. 135)
- The Tied Pubs (Scotland) Act 2021 (Commencement No. 2) Regulations 2024 (S.S.I. 2024 No. 136 (C. 12))
- The A85 Trunk Road (Comrie) (Temporary Prohibition on Use of Road) (No. 2) Order 2024 (S.S.I. 2024 No. 137)
- The A830 Trunk Road (Glenfinnan) (Temporary Prohibition on Use of Road) Order 2024 (S.S.I. 2024 No. 138)
- The Water Supply (Water Fittings) (Scotland) Byelaws Extension Order 2024 (S.S.I. 2024 No. 139)
- The Education (Fees and Student Support) (Miscellaneous Amendments) (Scotland) Regulations 2024 (S.S.I. 2024 No. 140)
- The Disability Assistance for Older People (Consequential Amendment and Transitional Provision) (Scotland) Regulations 2024 (S.S.I. 2024 No. 141)
- The Registration of Social Workers and Social Service Workers in Care Services (Scotland) Amendment Regulations 2024 (S.S.I. 2024 No. 142)
- The A9 and A96 Trunk Roads (Inshes to Smithton) (Side Roads) Order 2024 (S.S.I. 2024 No. 143)
- The M8 Trunk Road (Junction 29A, Bishopton) (Temporary Prohibition on Use of Road) Order 2024 (S.S.I. 2024 No. 144)
- The Bail and Release from Custody (Scotland) Act 2023 (Commencement No. 1) Regulations 2024 (S.S.I. 2024 No. 145 (C. 13))
- The Seed (Fees) (Scotland) Amendment Regulations 2024 (S.S.I. 2024 No. 146)
- The Teachers’ Pension Scheme (Scotland) Amendment Regulations 2024 (S.S.I. 2024 No. 147)
- The Sheriff (Removal from Office) Order 2024 (S.S.I. 2024 No. 148)
- The North East Scotland Trunk Roads (Temporary Prohibitions of Traffic and Overtaking and Temporary Speed Restrictions) (No. 5) Order 2024 (S.S.I. 2024 No. 149)
- The North West Scotland Trunk Roads (Temporary Prohibitions of Traffic and Overtaking and Temporary Speed Restrictions) (No. 5) Order 2024 (S.S.I. 2024 No. 150)
- The South West Scotland Trunk Roads (Temporary Prohibitions of Traffic and Overtaking and Temporary Speed Restrictions) (No. 4) Order 2024 (S.S.I. 2024 No. 151)
- The South East Scotland Trunk Roads (Temporary Prohibitions of Traffic and Overtaking and Temporary Speed Restrictions) (No. 5) Order 2024 (S.S.I. 2024 No. 152)
- The M8 (Newhouse to Easterhouse) M73 (Maryville to Mollinsburn) A8 (Newhouse to Bargeddie) A725 (Shawhead to Whistleberry) Trunk Roads (Temporary Prohibitions of Traffic and Overtaking and Temporary Speed Restrictions) (No. 2) Order 2024 (S.S.I. 2024 No. 153)
- The A85 Trunk Road (Oban) (Temporary Prohibition on Use of Road) Order 2024 (S.S.I. 2024 No. 154)
- The A87 Trunk Road (Portree to Prabost) (Temporary Prohibition on Use of Road) Order 2024 (S.S.I. 2024 No. 155)
- The Food Additives and Novel Foods (Authorisations and Miscellaneous Amendments) and Food Flavourings (Removal of Authorisations) (Scotland) Regulations 2024 (S.S.I. 2024 No. 156)
- Act of Sederunt (Messengers-at-Arms and Sheriff Officers Rules) (Amendment) 2024 (S.S.I. 2024 No. 157)
- The International Organisations (Immunities and Privileges) (Scotland) Amendment Order 2024 (S.S.I. 2024 No. 158)
- Act of Adjournal (Criminal Procedure Rules 1996 Amendment) (Mutual Legal Assistance) 2024 (S.S.I. 2024 No. 159)
- The A84 Trunk Road (Kildean Roundabout to Stirling Auction Mart Roundabout) (40mph Speed Limit) Order 2024 (S.S.I. 2024 No. 160)
- The Transport Partnerships (Transfer of Functions) (Scotland) Order 2024 (S.S.I. 2024 No. 161)
- The Scottish Tribunals (Listed Tribunals) Regulations 2024 (S.S.I. 2024 No. 162)
- The Damages (Review of Rate of Return) (Scotland) Regulations 2024 (S.S.I. 2024 No. 163)
- The Trusts and Succession (Scotland) Act 2024 (Commencement No. 1) Regulations 2024 (S.S.I. 2024 No. 164 (C. 14))
- The Sea Fisheries (Remote Electronic Monitoring and Regulation of Scallop Fishing) (Scotland) Regulations 2024 (S.S.I. 2024 No. 165)
- The Disability Assistance for Older People (Scotland) Regulations 2024 (S.S.I. 2024 No. 166)
- The A83 Trunk Road (Inveraray) (Temporary Prohibition on Use of Road) Order 2024 (S.S.I. 2024 No. 167)
- The Wildlife Management and Muirburn (Scotland) Act 2024 (Commencement No. 1) Regulations 2024 (S.S.I. 2024 No. 168 (C. 15))
- The Early Release of Prisoners and Prescribed Victim Supporters (Scotland) Regulations 2024 (S.S.I. 2024 No. 169)
- The Animal Welfare (Livestock Exports) Act 2024 (Commencement) (Scotland) Regulations 2024 (S.S.I. 2024 No. 170 (C. 16))
- The Healthcare Improvement Scotland (Inspections) Amendment Regulations 2024 (S.S.I. 2024 No. 171)
- The National Health Service (Scotland) Act 1978 (Independent Health Care) Modification Order 2024 (S.S.I. 2024 No. 172)
- The Carer’s Assistance (Carer Support Payment) (Scotland) Amendment Regulations 2024 (S.S.I. 2024 No. 173)
- Act of Adjournal (Criminal Procedure Rules 1996 Amendment) (United Nations Convention on the Rights of the Child (Incorporation) (Scotland) Act 2024) 2024 (S.S.I. 2024 No. 174)
- The Equality Act 2010 (Specification of Public Authorities) (Scotland) Order 2024 (S.S.I. 2024 No. 175)
- The Equality Act 2010 (Specific Duties) (Scotland) Amendment Regulations 2024 (S.S.I. 2024 No. 176)
- The A78 Trunk Road (Greenock) (Prohibition on Use of Road) Order 2024 (S.S.I. 2024 No. 177)
- The Legal Aid and Advice and Assistance (Miscellaneous Amendment) (Scotland) Regulations 2024 (S.S.I. 2024 No. 178)
- The Police Service of Scotland (Amendment) Regulations 2024 (S.S.I. 2024 No. 179)
- The A76 Trunk Road (New Cumnock) (Temporary Prohibition on Waiting, Loading and Unloading) (No. 2) Order 2024 (S.S.I. 2024 No. 180)
- The A85 Trunk Road (Comrie) (Temporary Prohibition on Use of Road) (No. 3) Order 2024 (S.S.I. 2024 No. 181)
- The M8 (Newhouse to Easterhouse) M73 (Maryville to Mollinsburn) M74 (Daldowie to Hamilton) A8 (Newhouse to Bargeddie) A725 (Shawhead to Whistleberry) A7071 (Bellshill) Trunk Roads (Temporary Prohibitions of Traffic and Overtaking and Temporary Speed Restrictions) (No. 2) Order 2024 (S.S.I. 2024 No. 182)
- The North West Scotland Trunk Roads (Temporary Prohibitions of Traffic and Overtaking and Temporary Speed Restrictions) (No. 6) Order 2024 (S.S.I. 2024 No. 183)
- The North East Scotland Trunk Roads (Temporary Prohibitions of Traffic and Overtaking and Temporary Speed Restrictions) (No. 6) Order 2024 (S.S.I. 2024 No. 184)
- The South East Scotland Trunk Roads (Temporary Prohibitions of Traffic and Overtaking and Temporary Speed Restrictions) (No. 6) Order 2024 (S.S.I. 2024 No. 185)
- The Valuation (Proposals Procedure) (Scotland) Amendment Regulations 2024 (S.S.I. 2024 No. 186)
- The Tied Pubs (Fees and Financial Penalties) (Scotland) Regulations 2024 (S.S.I. 2024 No. 187)
- The Scottish Pubs Code Adjudicator (Duty to Publish Certain Information) Regulations 2024 (S.S.I. 2024 No. 188)
- The Tied Pubs (Scottish Arbitration Rules) Amendment Order 2024 (S.S.I. 2024 No. 189)
- The Scottish Pubs Code Adjudicator (Miscellaneous Listings) Order 2024 (S.S.I. 2024 No. 190)
- The Waste (Materials Facilities) (Scotland) Regulations 2024 (S.S.I. 2024 No. 191)
- The Valuation Timetable (Scotland) Amendment Order 2024 (S.S.I. 2024 No. 192)
- The Scottish Pubs Code Regulations 2024 (S.S.I. 2024 No. 193)
- The A83 Trunk Road (Tarbert) (Temporary Prohibition on Use of Road) Order 2024 (S.S.I. 2024 No. 194)
- Act of Sederunt (Rules of the Court of Session 1994 and Sheriff Appeal Court Rules 2021 Amendment) (United Nations Convention on the Rights of the Child (Incorporation) (Scotland) Act 2024) 2024 (S.S.I. 2024 No. 195)
- Act of Sederunt (Rules of the Court of Session 1994 Amendment) (Protective Expenses Orders) 2024 (S.S.I. 2024 No. 196)
- Act of Sederunt (Proceedings for Determination of Compatibility Questions Rules) 2024 (S.S.I. 2024 No. 197)
- The Protected Trust Deeds (Miscellaneous Amendment) (Scotland) Regulations 2024 (S.S.I. 2024 No. 198)
- The A83 Trunk Road (Inveraray) (Temporary Prohibition on Use of Road) (No. 2) Order 2024 (S.S.I. 2024 No. 199)
- The A85 Trunk Road (Comrie) (Temporary Prohibition on Use of Road) (No. 4) Order 2024 (S.S.I. 2024 No. 200)

== 201-300 ==
- The A85 Trunk Road (Oban) (Temporary Prohibition on Use of Road) (No. 2) Order 2024 (S.S.I. 2024 No. 201)
- The A85 Trunk Road (Lochearnhead) (Temporary Prohibition on Use of Road) Order 2024 (S.S.I. 2024 No. 202)
- The A85 Trunk Road (Comrie) (Temporary Prohibition on Waiting, Loading and Unloading) (No. 4) Order 2024 (S.S.I. 2024 No. 203)
- The M8 (Newhouse to Easterhouse) M73 (Maryville to Mollinsburn) M74 (Daldowie to Hamilton) A725 (Shawhead to Whistleberry) Trunk Roads (Temporary Prohibitions of Traffic and Overtaking and Temporary Speed Restrictions) (No. 3) Order 2024 (S.S.I. 2024 No. 204)
- The North East Scotland Trunk Roads (Temporary Prohibitions of Traffic and Overtaking and Temporary Speed Restrictions) (No. 7) Order 2024 (S.S.I. 2024 No. 205)
- The South West Scotland Trunk Roads (Temporary Prohibitions of Traffic and Overtaking and Temporary Speed Restrictions) (No. 5) Order 2024 (S.S.I. 2024 No. 206)
- The South East Scotland Trunk Roads (Temporary Prohibitions of Traffic and Overtaking and Temporary Speed Restrictions) (No. 7) Order 2024 (S.S.I. 2024 No. 207)
- The North West Scotland Trunk Roads (Temporary Prohibitions of Traffic and Overtaking and Temporary Speed Restrictions) (No. 7) Order 2024 (S.S.I. 2024 No. 208)
- The A85 Trunk Road (Oban) (Temporary Prohibition on Waiting, Loading and Unloading) Order 2024 (S.S.I. 2024 No. 209)
- The A83 Trunk Road (Ardrishaig) (Temporary Prohibition on Use of Road) Order 2024 (S.S.I. 2024 No. 210)
- The Children (Care and Justice) (Scotland) Act 2024 (Commencement No. 1 and Transitional Provision) Regulations 2024 (S.S.I. 2024 No. 211 (C. 17))
- The A85 Trunk Road (Crieff) (Temporary Prohibition on Use of Road) Order 2024 (S.S.I. 2024 No. 212)
- The A95 Trunk Road (Granish to Grantown-On-Spey) (Temporary Prohibition on Use of Road and Specified Turns) Order 2024 (S.S.I. 2024 No. 213)
- The M9/A9 Trunk Road (Granish) (Temporary Prohibition on Use of Road and Specified Turns) Order 2024 (S.S.I. 2024 No. 214)
- The A85 Trunk Road (Comrie) (Temporary Prohibition on Waiting, Loading and Unloading) (No. 5) Order 2024 (S.S.I. 2024 No. 215)
- The Legal Aid and Advice and Assistance (Miscellaneous Amendment) (Scotland) (No. 2) Regulations 2024 (S.S.I. 2024 No. 216)
- The A85 Trunk Road (Oban) (Temporary Prohibition on Use of Road) (No. 3) Order 2024 (S.S.I. 2024 No. 217)
- The Charges for Residues Surveillance Amendment (Scotland) Regulations 2024 (S.S.I. 2024 No. 218)
- The Academic Awards and Distinctions (SRUC) (Scotland) Order of Council 2024 (S.S.I. 2024 No. 219)
- The Scottish Criminal Cases Review Commission (Permitted Disclosure of Information) Order 2024 (S.S.I. 2024 No. 220)
- The North East Scotland Trunk Roads (Temporary Prohibitions of Traffic and Overtaking and Temporary Speed Restrictions) (No. 8) Order 2024 (S.S.I. 2024 No. 221)
- The North West Scotland Trunk Roads (Temporary Prohibitions of Traffic and Overtaking and Temporary Speed Restrictions) (No. 8) Order 2024 (S.S.I. 2024 No. 222)
- The South West Scotland Trunk Roads (Temporary Prohibitions of Traffic and Overtaking and Temporary Speed Restrictions) (No. 6) Order 2024 (S.S.I. 2024 No. 223)
- The South East Scotland Trunk Roads (Temporary Prohibitions of Traffic and Overtaking and Temporary Speed Restrictions) (No. 8) Order 2024 (S.S.I. 2024 No. 224)
- The Personal Injuries (NHS Charges) (Amounts) (Scotland) Amendment (No. 2) Regulations 2024 (S.S.I. 2024 No. 225)
- The M80/A80 Trunk Road (Junction 9) (Temporary Speed Restrictions) Order 2024 (S.S.I. 2024 No. 226)
- The Civic Government (Scotland) Act 1982 (Licensing of Short-term Lets) Amendment Order 2024 (S.S.I. 2024 No. 227)
- The M8 (Newhouse to Easterhouse) M73 (Maryville to Mollinsburn) A8 (Newhouse to Bargeddie) A725 (Shawhead to Whistleberry) Trunk Roads (Temporary Prohibitions of Traffic and Overtaking and Temporary Speed Restrictions) (No. 3) Order 2024 (S.S.I. 2024 No. 228)
- The Local Services Franchises (Traffic Commissioner Notices and Panels) (Scotland) Regulations 2024 (S.S.I. 2024 No. 229)
- The Council Tax Reduction (Scotland) Amendment (No. 2) Regulations 2024 (S.S.I. 2024 No. 230)
- The Visitor Levy (Scotland) Act 2024 (Commencement) Regulations 2024 (S.S.I. 2024 No. 231 (C. 18))
- The Abortion Services (Safe Access Zones) (Scotland) Act 2024 (Commencement) Regulations 2024 (S.S.I. 2024 No. 232 (C. 19))
- The National Health Service (Free Prescriptions and Charges for Drugs and Appliances) (Scotland) Amendment Regulations 2024 (S.S.I. 2024 No. 233)
- The M74 Trunk Road (Junction 9 to Junction 11) (Temporary 30mph Speed Restriction) Order 2024 (S.S.I. 2024 No. 234)
- The Sheriff Court Fees Order 2024 (S.S.I. 2024 No. 235)
- The Sheriff Appeal Court Fees Order 2024 (S.S.I. 2024 No. 236)
- The High Court of Justiciary Fees Order 2024 (S.S.I. 2024 No. 237)
- The Court of Session etc. Fees Order 2024 (S.S.I. 2024 No. 238)
- The Justice of the Peace Court Fees (Scotland) Order 2024 (S.S.I. 2024 No. 239)
- The Adults with Incapacity (Public Guardian’s Fees) (Scotland) Regulations 2024 (S.S.I. 2024 No. 240)
- The Social Security (Genuine and Sufficient Link to the United Kingdom) (Miscellaneous Amendment) (Scotland) Regulations 2024 (S.S.I. 2024 No. 241)
- The Disclosure (Scotland) Act 2020 (Commencement No. 3) Regulations 2024 (S.S.I. 2024 No. 242 (C. 20))
- The Bus Services Improvement Partnerships (Multi-operator Travel Cards) (Scotland) Regulations 2024 (S.S.I. 2024 No. 243)
- The A68 Trunk Road (Pathhead) (Temporary Prohibition on Waiting, Loading and Unloading) Order 2024 (S.S.I. 2024 No. 244)
- The Tied Pubs (Miscellaneous Amendment) (Scotland) Regulations 2024 (S.S.I. 2024 No. 245)
- The Coronavirus (Recovery and Reform) (Scotland) Act 2022 (Early Expiry of Provisions) Regulations 2024 (S.S.I. 2024 No. 246)
- The Building (Scotland) Amendment Regulations 2024 (S.S.I. 2024 No. 247)
- The Public Service Vehicles (Registration of Local Services) (Bus Services Improvement Partnerships Service Standards Decisions) (Appeals) (Scotland) Regulations 2024 (S.S.I. 2024 No. 248)
- The Upper Tribunal for Scotland (Bus Registration Appeals Rules of Procedure) Regulations 2024 (S.S.I. 2024 No. 249)
- The Town and Country Planning (Amendment of Local Development Plan) (Scotland) Regulations 2024 (S.S.I. 2024 No. 250)
- The A68 Trunk Road (Pathhead) (Temporary 20mph Speed Restriction) Order 2024 (S.S.I. 2024 No. 251)
- The Planning (Scotland) Act 2019 (Commencement No. 14) Regulations 2024 (S.S.I. 2024 No. 252 (C. 21))
- The Town and Country Planning (Masterplan Consent Areas) (Scotland) Regulations 2024 (S.S.I. 2024 No. 253)
- The M8 (Newhouse to Easterhouse) M73 (Maryville to Mollinsburn) M74 (Daldowie to Hamilton) A8 (Newhouse to Bargeddie) A725 (Shawhead to Whistleberry) A7071 (Bellshill) Trunk Roads (Temporary Prohibitions of Traffic and Overtaking and Temporary Speed Restrictions) (No. 3) Order 2024 (S.S.I. 2024 No. 254)
- The North East Scotland Trunk Roads (Temporary Prohibitions of Traffic and Overtaking and Temporary Speed Restrictions) (No. 9) Order 2024 (S.S.I. 2024 No. 255)
- The North West Scotland Trunk Roads (Temporary Prohibitions of Traffic and Overtaking and Temporary Speed Restrictions) (No. 9) Order 2024 (S.S.I. 2024 No. 256)
- The South East Scotland Trunk Roads (Temporary Prohibitions of Traffic and Overtaking and Temporary Speed Restrictions) (No. 9) Order 2024 (S.S.I. 2024 No. 257)
- The A9 Trunk Road (Killiecrankie to Glen Garry) (Side Roads) Order 2024 (S.S.I. 2024 No. 258)
- The A9 Trunk Road (Killiecrankie to Glen Garry) (Trunking) Order 2024 (S.S.I. 2024 No. 259)
- The A68 Trunk Road (Lauder) (20mph Speed Limit) Order 2024 (S.S.I. 2024 No. 260)
- The A7 Trunk Road (Selkirk) (20mph and 30mph Speed Limits) Order 2024 (S.S.I. 2024 No. 261)
- The A702 Trunk Road (West Linton) (20mph and 30mph Speed Limits) Order 2024 (S.S.I. 2024 No. 262)
- The A68 Trunk Road (Jedburgh) (20mph and 30mph Speed Limits) Order 2024 (S.S.I. 2024 No. 263)
- The A7 Trunk Road (Hawick) (20mph and 30mph Speed Limits) Order 2024 (S.S.I. 2024 No. 264)
- The A702 Trunk Road (Carlops) (20mph Speed Limit) Order 2024 (S.S.I. 2024 No. 265)
- The Companies Act 2006 (Scottish public sector companies to be audited by the Auditor General for Scotland) Order 2024 (S.S.I. 2024 No. 266)
- The Wildlife Management and Muirburn (Scotland) Act 2024 (Commencement No. 2 and Saving Provision) Regulations 2024 (S.S.I. 2024 No. 267 (C. 22))
- The Wildlife Management (Consequential Amendments) (Scotland) Regulations 2024 (S.S.I. 2024 No. 268)
- The Environmental Protection (Single-use Vapes) (Scotland) Regulations 2024 (S.S.I. 2024 No. 269)
- The Road Traffic (Permitted Parking Area and Special Parking Area) (West Dunbartonshire Council) Designation Order 2024 (S.S.I. 2024 No. 270)
- The Parking Attendants (Wearing of Uniforms) (West Dunbartonshire Council) Regulations 2024 (S.S.I. 2024 No. 271)
- The National Health Service Superannuation and Pension Schemes (Miscellaneous Amendment) (Scotland) Regulations 2024 (S.S.I. 2024 No. 272)
- The Title Conditions (Scotland) Act 2003 (Rural Housing Bodies) Amendment Order 2024 (S.S.I. 2024 No. 273)
- The Property Factors (Registration) (Scotland) Regulations 2024 (S.S.I. 2024 No. 274)
- The Registration of Births, Still-births, Deaths and Marriages (Prescription of Forms) (Scotland) Amendment Regulations 2024 (S.S.I. 2024 No. 275)
- The A99 Trunk Road (Wick) (Temporary Prohibition on Waiting, Loading and Unloading) Order 2024 (S.S.I. 2024 No. 276)
- The A85 Trunk Road (Oban) (Temporary Prohibition on Use of Road) (No. 4) Order 2024 (S.S.I. 2024 No. 277)
- The M90/A90 (Finavon Bridge) (Temporary Vehicle Weight Restriction) Order 2024 (S.S.I. 2024 No. 278)
- The A82 Trunk Road (North Ballachulish) (Temporary Prohibition on Use of Road) Order 2024 (S.S.I. 2024 No. 279)
- The A85 Trunk Road (Comrie) (Temporary Prohibition on Waiting, Loading and Unloading) (No. 6) Order 2024 (S.S.I. 2024 No. 280)
- The Registration of Births, Deaths and Marriages (Scotland) Act 1965 (Prohibition on Disposal of a Body without Authorisation) Amendment Regulations 2024 (S.S.I. 2024 No. 281)
- The A85 Trunk Road (Crieff) (Temporary Prohibition on Waiting, Loading and Unloading) Order 2024 (S.S.I. 2024 No. 282)
- The A9 Trunk Road (Thurso) (Temporary Prohibition on Waiting, Loading and Unloading) Order 2024 (S.S.I. 2024 No. 283)
- The A9 Trunk Road (Tomatin to Moy) (Temporary Prohibition of Traffic, Specified Turns and Overtaking and Temporary Speed Restrictions) Order 2024 (S.S.I. 2024 No. 284)
- The North West Scotland Trunk Roads (Temporary Prohibitions of Traffic and Overtaking and Temporary Speed Restrictions) (No. 10) Order 2024 (S.S.I. 2024 No. 285)
- The North East Scotland Trunk Roads (Temporary Prohibitions of Traffic and Overtaking and Temporary Speed Restrictions) (No. 10) Order 2024 (S.S.I. 2024 No. 286)
- The South East Scotland Trunk Roads (Temporary Prohibitions of Traffic and Overtaking and Temporary Speed Restrictions) (No. 10) Order 2024 (S.S.I. 2024 No. 287)
- The South West Scotland Trunk Roads (Temporary Prohibitions of Traffic and Overtaking and Temporary Speed Restrictions) (No. 7) Order 2024 (S.S.I. 2024 No. 288)
- The A83 Trunk Road (Lochgilphead) (Temporary Prohibition on Use of Road) Order 2024 (S.S.I. 2024 No. 289)
- The M90 Trunk Road Friarton Bridge (Temporary Vehicle Weight Restriction) Order 2024 (S.S.I. 2024 No. 290)
- The A737 Trunk Road (Kilwinning) (Temporary Prohibition on Waiting, Loading and Unloading) Order 2024 (S.S.I. 2024 No. 291)
- The Town and Country Planning (Fees for Applications) (Scotland) Amendment Regulations 2024 (S.S.I. 2024 No. 292)
- The Diligence against Earnings (Variation) (Scotland) Regulations 2024 (S.S.I. 2024 No. 293)
- The Plant Health (Import Inspection Fees) (Scotland) Amendment (No. 2) Regulations 2024 (S.S.I. 2024 No. 294)
- The Firefighters’ Pension Schemes (Scotland) Amendment (No. 2) Order 2024 (S.S.I. 2024 No. 295)
- The A84 Trunk Road (Doune) (Temporary Prohibition on Use of Road) Order 2024 (S.S.I. 2024 No. 296)
- The A84 Trunk Road (Callander) (Temporary Prohibition on Use of Road) Order 2024 (S.S.I. 2024 No. 297)
- The A9 Trunk Road (Brora) (Temporary Prohibition on Use of Road) Order 2024 (S.S.I. 2024 No. 298)
- The A78 Trunk Road (Inverkip) (Temporary Prohibition on Use of Road) Order 2024 (S.S.I. 2024 No. 299)
- The A985 Trunk Road (Rosyth) (Temporary 20mph Speed Restriction) Order 2024 (S.S.I. 2024 No. 300)

=== 301-394 ===
- The A7 Trunk Road (Langholm) (Temporary Prohibition on Use of Road) Order 2024 (S.S.I. 2024 No. 301)
- The A82 Trunk Road (Spean Bridge) (Temporary Prohibition on Use of Road) (No. 2) Order 2024 (S.S.I. 2024 No. 302)
- The A87 Trunk Road (Balmacara) (Temporary Prohibition on Use of Road) Order 2024 (S.S.I. 2024 No. 303)
- The A83 Trunk Road (Arrochar) (Temporary Prohibition on Use of Road) Order 2024 (S.S.I. 2024 No. 304)
- The A96 Trunk Road (Nairn) (Temporary Prohibition on Use of Road) Order 2024 (S.S.I. 2024 No. 305)
- The M9/A9 Trunk Road (Thurso) (Temporary Prohibition on Use of Road) Order 2024 (S.S.I. 2024 No. 306)
- The A83 Trunk Road (Campbeltown) (Temporary Prohibition on Use of Road) Order 2024 (S.S.I. 2024 No. 307)
- The A96 Trunk Road (Keith) (Temporary Prohibition on Use of Road) Order 2024 (S.S.I. 2024 No. 308)
- The A83 Trunk Road (Lochgilphead) (Temporary Prohibition on Use of Road) (No. 2) Order 2024 (S.S.I. 2024 No. 309)
- The Council Tax Reduction (Scotland) Amendment (No. 3) Regulations 2024 (S.S.I. 2024 No. 310)
- The Disability Assistance (Scottish Adult Disability Living Allowance) (Consequential Amendment, Revocation and Saving Provision) Regulations 2024 (S.S.I. 2024 No. 311)
- The A83 Trunk Road (Cairndow) (Temporary Prohibition on Use of Road) Order 2024 (S.S.I. 2024 No. 312)
- The Protection of Vulnerable Groups (Referrals by Chief Constable) (Prescribed Information) (Scotland) Regulations 2024 (S.S.I. 2024 No. 313)
- The Protection of Vulnerable Groups (Information for Listing and Vetting) (Scotland) Regulations 2024 (S.S.I. 2024 No. 314)
- The Level 1 and Level 2 Disclosure Information (Scotland) Regulations 2024 (S.S.I. 2024 No. 315)
- The Consideration of Suitability for Regulated Roles (Prescribed Purposes) (Scotland) Regulations 2024 (S.S.I. 2024 No. 316)
- The Disclosure and Use of Level 2 Disclosures (Prescribed Purpose and Circumstances) (Scotland) Regulations 2024 (S.S.I. 2024 No. 317)
- The A83 Trunk Road (Ardrishaig) (Temporary Prohibition on Use of Road) (No. 2) Order 2024 (S.S.I. 2024 No. 318)
- The A85 Trunk Road (Comrie) (Temporary Prohibition on Use of Road) (No. 5) Order 2024 (S.S.I. 2024 No. 319)
- The A702 Trunk Road (Hillend) (Prohibition on Waiting, Loading and Unloading) Order 2024 (S.S.I. 2024 No. 320)
- The A83 Trunk Road (Tarbert) (Temporary Prohibition on Use of Road) (No. 2) Order 2 (S.S.I. 2024 No. 321)
- The Coronavirus (Recovery and Reform) (Scotland) Act 2022 (Extension of Temporary Justice Measures) Regulations 2024 (S.S.I. 2024 No. 322)
- Act of Sederunt (Rules of the Court of Session 1994, Sheriff Appeal Court Rules 2021 and Ordinary Cause Rules 1993 Amendment) (Taxation of Judicial Expenses) 2024 (S.S.I. 2024 No. 323)
- The Official Controls (Import of High Risk Food and Feed of Non-Animal Origin) Amendment (Scotland) (No. 2) Regulations 2024 (S.S.I. 2024 No. 324)
- The Dumfries and Galloway Council (Stranraer) Harbour Revision Order 2024 (S.S.I. 2024 No. 325)
- The Food Safety (Sampling and Qualifications) (Scotland) Amendment Regulations 2024 (S.S.I. 2024 No. 326)
- The Building (Scotland) Amendment (No. 2) Regulations 2024 (S.S.I. 2024 No. 327)
- The A977/A876 Trunk Road (Kincardine) (Temporary 20mph Speed Restriction) Order 2024 (S.S.I. 2024 No. 328)
- The A85 Trunk Road (Oban) (Temporary Prohibition on Use of Road) (No. 5) Order 2024 (S.S.I. 2024 No. 329)
- The Feed Additives (Authorisations) and Uses of Feed Intended for Particular Nutritional Purposes (Miscellaneous Amendment) (Scotland) Regulations 2024 (S.S.I. 2024 No. 330)
- The A83 Trunk Road (Inveraray) (Temporary Prohibition on Use of Road) (No. 3) Order 2024 (S.S.I. 2024 No. 331)
- The Public Procurement (International Trade Agreements) (Miscellaneous Amendments) (Scotland) Regulations 2024 (S.S.I. 2024 No. 332)
- Not Allocated (S.S.I. 2024 No. 333)
- The Burial (Applications and Register) (Scotland) Regulations 2024 (S.S.I. 2024 No. 334)
- The Burial and Cremation (Scotland) Act 2016 (Commencement No. 6 and Transitional Provisions) Regulations 2024 (S.S.I. 2024 No. 335 (C. 23))
- The Upper Tribunal for Scotland Bus Registration Appeals (Composition) Regulations 2024 (S.S.I. 2024 No. 336)
- The Upper Tribunal for Scotland (Transfer of Functions of the Transport Tribunal) Regulations 2024 (S.S.I. 2024 No. 337)
- The Public Procurement (Miscellaneous Amendment) (Scotland) Regulations 2024 (S.S.I. 2024 No. 338)
- Not Allocated (S.S.I. 2024 No. 339)
- The A9 and A95 Trunk Roads (Dalraddy to Slochd) (Trunking) Order 2024 (S.S.I. 2024 No. 340)
- The A9 and A95 Trunk Roads (Dalraddy to Slochd) (Side Roads) Order 2024 (S.S.I. 2024 No. 341)
- The Rural Development (Continuation of Operation) (Miscellaneous Amendment) (Scotland) Regulations 2024 (S.S.I. 2024 No. 342)
- The A9 Trunk Road (Helmsdale) (Temporary 20mph Speed Restriction) Order 2024 (S.S.I. 2024 No. 343)
- The A9 Trunk Road (Golspie) (Temporary 20mph Speed Restriction) Order 2024 (S.S.I. 2024 No. 344)
- The A83 Trunk Road (Campbeltown) (Temporary Prohibition on Use of Road) (No. 2) Order 2024 (S.S.I. 2024 No. 345)
- The M9/A9 Trunk Road (Thurso and Scrabster) (Temporary 20mph, 30mph and 40mph Speed Restrictions) Order 2024 (S.S.I. 2024 No. 346)
- The A85 Trunk Road (Oban) (Temporary Prohibition on Use of Road) (No. 6) Order 2024 (S.S.I. 2024 No. 347)
- The M9/A9 Trunk Road (Brora) (Temporary 20mph Speed Restriction) Order 2024 (S.S.I. 2024 No. 348)
- The Free-Range Egg Marketing Standards (Amendment) (Scotland) Regulations 2024 (S.S.I. 2024 No. 349)
- The North West Scotland Trunk Roads (Temporary Speed Restrictions) Order 2024 (S.S.I. 2024 No. 350)
- The Winter Heating Assistance (Pension Age) (Scotland) Regulations 2024 (S.S.I. 2024 No. 351)
- The Sports Grounds and Sporting Events (Designation) (Scotland) Amendment Order 2024 (S.S.I. 2024 No. 352)
- Act of Sederunt (Rules of the Court of Session 1994, Sheriff Appeal Court Rules 2021 and Sheriff Court Rules Amendment) (Statutory Interveners) 2024 (S.S.I. 2024 No. 353)
- The Electronic Monitoring (Approved Devices) (Scotland) Amendment Regulations 2024 (S.S.I. 2024 No. 354)
- The South West Scotland Trunk Roads (Temporary Prohibitions of Traffic and Overtaking and Temporary Speed Restrictions) (No. 8) Order 2024 (S.S.I. 2024 No. 355)
- The North West Scotland Trunk Roads (Temporary Prohibitions of Traffic and Overtaking and Temporary Speed Restrictions) (No. 11) Order 2024 (S.S.I. 2024 No. 356)
- The North East Scotland Trunk Roads (Temporary Prohibitions of Traffic and Overtaking and Temporary Speed Restrictions) (No. 11) Order 2024 (S.S.I. 2024 No. 357)
- The A82 Trunk Road (Fort William) (Temporary Prohibition on Use of Road) (No. 2) Order 2024 (S.S.I. 2024 No. 358)
- The M77/A77 Trunk Road (Girvan) (Temporary Prohibition on Use of Road) Order 2024 (S.S.I. 2024 No. 359)
- The South East Scotland Trunk Roads (Temporary Prohibitions of Traffic and Overtaking and Temporary Speed Restrictions) (No. 11) Order 2024 (S.S.I. 2024 No. 360)
- The A84/A85 Trunk Road (Callander) (Temporary Prohibition on Use of Road) Order 2024 (S.S.I. 2024 No. 361)
- The A83 Trunk Road (Inveraray) (Temporary Prohibition on Use of Road) (No. 4) Order 2024 (S.S.I. 2024 No. 362)
- The Funeral Expense Assistance (Scotland) Amendment Regulations 2024 (S.S.I. 2024 No. 363)
- The M90/A90 (Finavon Bridge) (Temporary Vehicle Weight Restriction) (No. 2) Order 2024 (S.S.I. 2024 No. 364)
- The Town and Country Planning (Amendment of National Planning Framework) (Scotland) Regulations 2024 (S.S.I. 2024 No. 365)
- The Masterplan Consent Area Scheme (Environmental Impact Assessment) (Scotland) Regulations 2024 (S.S.I. 2024 No. 366)
- The Land and Buildings Transaction Tax (additional amount: transactions relating to second homes etc.) (Scotland) Amendment Order 2024 (S.S.I. 2024 No. 367)
- The Conservation of Salmon (Miscellaneous Amendment) (Scotland) Regulations 2024 (S.S.I. 2024 No. 368)
- The Town and Country Planning (Fees for Applications) (Scotland) Amendment (Amendment) Regulations 2024 (S.S.I. 2024 No. 369)
- The Housing (Cladding Remediation) (Scotland) Act 2024 (Commencement) Regulations 2024 (S.S.I. 2024 No. 370 (C. 24))
- The Financial Assistance for Environmental Purposes (Variation) (Scotland) Order 2024 (S.S.I. 2024 No. 371)
- The Budget (Scotland) Act 2024 Amendment Regulations 2024 (S.S.I. 2024 No. 372)
- The Bankruptcy and Diligence (Scotland) Act 2024 (Commencement No. 1, Transitional and Saving Provisions) Regulations 2024 (S.S.I. 2024 No. 373 (C. 25))
- The Local Government Pension Scheme (Remediable Service) (Scotland) (Miscellaneous Amendment) Regulations 2024 (S.S.I. 2024 No. 374)
- The Transport (Scotland) Act 2019 (Commencement No. 8) Regulations 2024 (S.S.I. 2024 No. 375 (C. 26))
- The Building (Procedure) (Scotland) Amendment Regulations 2024 (S.S.I. 2024 No. 376)
- The Sexual Offences Act 2003 (Prescribed Police Stations) (Scotland) Amendment (No. 2) Regulations 2024 (S.S.I. 2024 No. 377)
- The Moveable Transactions (Scotland) Act 2023 (Commencement) Regulations 2024 (S.S.I. 2024 No. 378 (C. 27))
- The Moveable Transactions (Forms) (Scotland) Regulations 2024 (S.S.I. 2024 No. 379)
- The Rural Support (Improvement) (Miscellaneous Amendment) (Scotland) Regulations 2024 (S.S.I. 2024 No. 380)
- The Moveable Transactions (Register of Assignations and Register of Statutory Pledges Rules) (Scotland) Regulations 2024 (S.S.I. 2024 No. 381)
- The Ardersier Port Limited (Pilotage Powers) Order 2024 (S.S.I. 2024 No. 382)
- The A85 Trunk Road (Comrie) (Temporary Prohibition on Use of Road) (No. 6) Order 2024 (S.S.I. 2024 No. 383)
- Not Allocated (S.S.I. 2024 No. 384)
- The South East Scotland Trunk Roads (Temporary Prohibitions of Traffic and Overtaking and Temporary Speed Restrictions) (No. 12) Order 2024 (S.S.I. 2024 No. 385)
- The South West Scotland Trunk Roads (Temporary Prohibitions of Traffic and Overtaking and Temporary Speed Restrictions) (No. 9) Order 2024 (S.S.I. 2024 No. 386)
- The Bread and Flour Amendment (Scotland) Regulations 2024 (S.S.I. 2024 No. 387)
- The A9 and A86 Trunk Roads (Crubenmore to Kincraig) (Trunking) Order 2024 (S.S.I. 2024 No. 388)
- The A9 and A86 Trunk Roads (Crubenmore to Kincraig) (Side Roads) Order 2024 (S.S.I. 2024 No. 389)
- Not Allocated (S.S.I. 2024 No. 390)
- The North West Scotland Trunk Roads (Temporary Prohibitions of Traffic and Overtaking and Temporary Speed Restrictions) (No. 12) Order 2024 (S.S.I. 2024 No. 391)
- The North East Scotland Trunk Roads (Temporary Prohibitions of Traffic and Overtaking and Temporary Speed Restrictions) (No. 12) Order 2024 (S.S.I. 2024 No. 392)
- The Regulated Roles (Prohibitions and Requirements) (Scotland) Regulations 2024 (S.S.I. 2024 No. 393)
- The A9 Trunk Road (Brora) (Temporary Prohibition on Use of Road) Order 2024 (S.S.I. 2024 No. 394)
