= Paternity Leave (Bereavement) Act 2024 =

Act of the Parliament of the United Kingdom

Paternity Leave (Bereavement) Act 2024 (Note: Section 2(4).)
- Act of Parliament
- Parliament of the United Kingdom
- Long title: An Act to make provision about paternity leave in cases where a mother, or a person with whom a child is placed or expected to be placed for adoption, dies.
- Citation: 2024 c. 17
- Introduced by: Chris Elmore (Commons); Ruth Smeeth (Lords)
- Territorial extent: England and Wales; Scotland; (Note: Section 2(1).)

Dates
- Royal assent: 24 May 2025
- Commencement: 29 December 2025 (Note: Section 2(2)–(3). The Paternity Leave (Bereavement) Act 2024 (Commencement) Regulations 2025 (SI 2025/1342).)
Other legislation
Amends	Employment Rights Act 1996

Status: Current legislation

Text of statute as originally enacted

Revised text of statute as amended

The Paternity Leave (Bereavement) Act 2024 (c. 17) is an act of the Parliament of the United Kingdom that amended the Employment Rights Act 1996. It extends the right to compassionate leave for bereaved parents.

== Background ==
In 2022, Aaron Horsey launched a two-year campaign to change the law after his wife died during childbirth. Under the law at the time, an employee did not qualify for bereavement leave on the ground that the other parent of their child had died within twelve months of the birth or adoption of the child until they had been employed for 26 weeks.

On 20 December 2022, Darren Henry introduced a private member's bill, the Shared Parental Leave and Pay (Bereavement) Bill, under the Ten Minute Rule, to remove the qualifying period of employment in cases where the birth or adopting parent had died. The bill did not receive a second reading.

== Passage ==
Another bill was introduced in the House of Commons by Chris Elmore on 6 December 2023. Second reading of the bill in the House of Commons took place on 26 January 2024. The Bill passed second reading with cross-party support.

There was no report stage for the bill and it passed straight to third reading in the House of Commons on 26 April 2024. It passed the House of Lords on 24 May 2024, and was granted royal assent on the same day. It came into force on 29 December 2025.

== Provisions ==
The act amends the Employment Rights Act 1996 to give the parent of a child whose other parent died within 12 months of the child's birth or adoption the right to take a leave of absence, regardless of how long they have been employed by their employer. Previously this right was only acquired after an employee had been employed for 26 weeks. Each year, about 180 mothers in the United Kingdom die within a year of their child's birth.

== Bibliography ==
- This article incorporates text published under the United Kingdom Open Parliament Licence: Waitzman, Eren (10 May 2024). Paternity Leave (Bereavement) Bill: HL Bill 70 of 2023–24 (Report). House of Lords Library. LLN-2024-0025.
- This article incorporates text published under the United Kingdom Open Parliament Licence: Brione, Patrick (23 April 2024). Shared Parental Leave and Pay (Bereavement) Bill 2023-24 [formerly the Shared Parental Leave and Pay (Bereavement) Bill]: Progress (Report). House of Commons Library. CBP-9938.
