= Automated Vehicles Act 2024 =

Act of the Parliament of the United Kingdom

Automated Vehicles Act 2024 (Note: Section 100.)
- Act of Parliament
- Parliament of the United Kingdom
- Long title: An Act to regulate the use of automated vehicles on roads and in other public places; and to make other provision in relation to vehicle automation.
- Citation: 2024 c. 10
- Territorial extent: England and Wales; Scotland; Northern Ireland (in part); (Note: Section 98.)

Dates
- Royal assent: 20 May 2024
- Commencement: Various (Note: Section 99.)
Other legislation
| Amends | Theft Act 1968; Prescription and Limitation (Scotland) Act 1973; Limitation Act 1980; Road Traffic Act 1988; Road Traffic Offenders Act 1988; Crime (International Co-operation) Act 2003; Armed Forces Act 2006; Consumer Rights Act 2015; Automated and Electric Vehicles Act 2018 |

Status: Not yet in force

Text of statute as originally enacted

Revised text of statute as amended

The Automated Vehicles Act 2024 (c. 10) is an act of the Parliament of the United Kingdom creating a regulatory regime relating to the use of vehicular automation in England, Wales, and Scotland, and granting the government powers to operate that scheme. It also creates a number of criminal offences related to breaches of the rules.

== Background ==
In 2018, Parliament passed the Automated and Electric Vehicles Act 2018, the first primary legislation dedicated to self-driving vehicles.

The Automated Vehicles Bill was introduced in the Lords on 8 November 2023.

== Provisions ==
The act allows "authorised self-driving entities" to legally operate self-driving taxi services. To become an authorised self-driving entity, tests must demonstrate that the vehicle are at least as safe as careful human drivers.

The act requires that the manufacturer of a vehicle bear the responsibility for accidents or injuries caused by a vehicle in self-driving mode.

== Implementation ==
In 2024, when the act was passed by the Sunak ministry, the intention of the UK Government was for the act to be operational from 2026, but this was delayed in 2025 to late 2027 by the Starmer ministry.

== Bibliography ==
- This article incorporates text published under the United Kingdom Open Parliament Licence: Tyers, Roger (1 March 2024). Automated Vehicles Bill [HL] 2023-24 (Report). House of Commons Library.
