= Glue Traps (Offences) Act 2022 =

Act of the Parliament of the United Kingdom

- Act of Parliament
- Parliament of the United Kingdom
- Long title: An Act to make certain uses of glue traps an offence; and for connected purposes.
- Citation: 2022 c. 26
- Territorial extent: England and Wales

Dates
- Royal assent: 28 April 2022
- Commencement: 31 July 2024

Status: Amended

History of passage through Parliament

Text of statute as originally enacted

Text of the Glue Traps (Offences) Act 2022 as in force today (including any amendments) within the United Kingdom, from legislation.gov.uk.

The Glue Traps (Offences) Act 2022 (c. 26) is an act of the Parliament of the United Kingdom relating to the use of glue traps in England.

It makes it an offence to use glue traps against rodents, except in limited circumstances dependent on a license being granted by the government under the act, and adds a duty that anyone discovering a glue trap must take action to make it safe so that no animal may be caught in it.

It also grants powers to constables and authorized inspectors to enforce the law. In addition to people and companies, the act also binds the Crown, other than from criminal liability, There is a section explicitly exempting the monarch from criminal liability under the act.

The act was introduced into Parliament as a private members' bill, sponsored by Jane Stevenson and Baroness Fookes. It received Royal Assent on 28 April 2022, and came into effect on 31 July 2024.

Although the act applies to the jurisdiction of England and Wales, the text of the act refers only to acts committed in England. The use of glue traps in Wales is prohibited under the Agriculture (Wales) Act 2023, enacted by the Senedd Cymru. In Scotland, the use of glue traps by unauthorized people against any animal other than invertebrates is prohibited by the Wildlife Management and Muirburn (Scotland) Act 2024 passed by the Scottish Parliament.

Although the act prohibits the use of glue traps except by licensed operators, it does not prohibit their sale, and glue traps have remained on sale to the public.
