= Pet Abduction Act 2024 =

Act of the Parliament of the United Kingdom

- Act of Parliament
- Parliament of the United Kingdom
- Long title: An Act to create offences of dog abduction and cat abduction and to confer a power to make corresponding provision relating to the abduction of other animals commonly kept as pets.
- Citation: 2024 c. 16
- Introduced by: Anna Firth (Commons); The Lord Black of Brentwood (Lords)
- Territorial extent: England and Wales; Northern Ireland; (Note: Section 5.)

Dates
- Royal assent: 24 May 2024
- Commencement: 24 May 2024 (sections 3 and 5–7); 24 August 2024 (sections 1 and 2); (Note: Section 6.)
Other legislation
Amends	Magistrates' Courts (Northern Ireland) Order 1981

Status: Current legislation

History of passage through Parliament

Text of statute as originally enacted

Revised text of statute as amended

The Pet Abduction Act 2024 (c. 16) is an act of the Parliament of the United Kingdom.

== Passage ==
The bill was introduced by Anna Firth to the House of Commons on 6 December 2023. It passed its third reading in the Commons on 19 April 2024. It was introduced to the House of Lords by Lord Black of Brentwood that same day and received a second reading in the Lords on 10 May 2024. It was approved by Parliament on 24 May, ahead of the 2024 general election, and received royal assent the same day.

== Background ==
The act makes the abduction of domestic pets, such as cats and dogs, a specific criminal offence in England and Northern Ireland, with convictions resulting in either a fine and/or up to five years in prison. Theft of animals, which are treated as property by the law, has been covered by the Theft Act 1968, but the Pet Abduction Act is the first legislation to specifically address the theft of pets, and follows the 2021 publication of the UK government's Action Plan for Animal Welfare, which recognised that "cats and dogs are not inanimate objects but sentient beings capable of experiencing distress and other emotional trauma when they are stolen from their owners or keepers".

The UK government had said it would make the theft of dogs a criminal offence in 2021, and measures were included in the Animal Welfare (Kept Animals) Bill, but were dropped in May 2023. Following its introduction, the Pet Abduction Bill received its second House of Commons reading on 19 January, and following government support, goes forward to the committee stage for further consideration.

In February 2024, Conservative MP Sir Christopher Chope tabled an amendment that would initially restrict the legislation to cover the abduction of dogs, and only be extended to cats once legislation is passed requiring them to be microchipped. Although the amendment was unlikely to be adopted since the bill had the support of the government, Parliamentary time would be needed to debate the potential changes, thus delaying the bill's passage through Parliament. On 24 May 2024, the bill was pushed through parliament on its final day of sitting before the 2024 general election, with the Pet Abduction Act set to come into force in August. It received Royal Assent later the same day.

== Northern Ireland ==
On 20 May 2024, the Stormont Assembly endorsed a Legislative Consent Motion to extend the Pet Abduction Act to Northern Ireland, making the abduction of cats and dogs a criminal offence.
