= List of acts of the Parliament of the United Kingdom from 2022 =

This is a list of acts of the Parliament of the United Kingdom passed in 2022.

Acts passed since 1963 are cited by calendar year, as opposed to the convention used for earlier acts of citing the regnal year(s) in which the relevant parliamentary session was held. Each act passed in a respective year is given a chapter number (abbreviated "c."), denoted by Arabic numerals in the case of public general acts, lowercase Roman numerals in the case of local acts, or italicised Arabic numerals in the case of personal acts. These run as separate series.

50 acts of Parliament were passed in 2022: 48 public general acts and 2 local acts.

indicates that an act has been transcribed on Wikisource, indicates that an act is available to view at legislation.gov.uk, and indicates the location of the original act in the Parliamentary Archives.

== Public general acts ==
Short title	Citation	Royal assent
Long title
Leasehold Reform (Ground Rent) Act 2022	2022 c. 1	8 February 2022
An Act to make provision about the rent payable under long leases of dwellings; and for connected purposes.
Northern Ireland (Ministers, Elections and Petitions of Concern) Act 2022	2022 c. 2	8 February 2022
An Act to make provision about Ministerial appointments, extraordinary Assembly elections, the Ministerial Code of Conduct and petitions of concern in Northern Ireland.
Finance Act 2022	2022 c. 3	24 February 2022
An Act to grant certain duties, to alter other duties, and to amend the law relating to the national debt and the public revenue, and to make further provision in connection with finance.
Advanced Research and Invention Agency Act 2022	2022 c. 4	24 February 2022
An Act to make provision for and in connection with the establishment of the Advanced Research and Invention Agency.
Dormant Assets Act 2022	2022 c. 5	24 February 2022
An Act to make provision for and in connection with an expanded dormant assets scheme; to confer power to further expand the scope of that scheme; to amend the Dormant Bank and Building Society Accounts Act 2008; (Note: Dormant Bank and Building Society Accounts Act 2008 (c. 31)) to enable an authorised reclaim fund to accept transfers of certain unwanted assets; and for connected purposes.
Charities Act 2022	2022 c. 6	24 February 2022
An Act to amend the Charities Act 2011 (Note: Charities Act 2011 (c. 25)) and the Universities and College Estates Act 1925; (Note: Universities and College Estates Act 1925 (15 & 16 Geo. 5. c. 24)) and for connected purposes.
Public Service Pensions and Judicial Offices Act 2022	2022 c. 7	10 March 2022
An Act to make provision about public service pension schemes, including retrospective provision to rectify unlawful discrimination in the way in which existing schemes were restricted under the Public Service Pensions Act 2013 (Note: Public Service Pensions Act 2013 (c. 25)) and corresponding Northern Ireland legislation; to make provision for the establishment of new public pension schemes for members of occupational pension schemes of bodies that were brought into public ownership under the Banking (Special Provisions) Act 2008; (Note: Banking (Special Provisions) Act 2008 (c. 2)) to make provision about the remuneration and the date of retirement of holders of certain judicial offices; to make provision about judicial service after retirement; and for connected purposes.
Supply and Appropriation (Anticipation and Adjustments) Act 2022	2022 c. 8	15 March 2022
An Act to authorise the use of resources for the years ending with 31 March 2021, 31 March 2022 and 31 March 2023; to authorise the issue of sums out of the Consolidated Fund for those years; and to appropriate the supply authorised by this Act for the years ending with 31 March 2021 and 31 March 2022.
National Insurance Contributions Act 2022	2022 c. 9	15 March 2022
An Act to make provision in relation to national insurance contributions.
Economic Crime (Transparency and Enforcement) Act 2022	2022 c. 10	15 March 2022
An Act to set up a register of overseas entities and their beneficial owners and require overseas entities who own land to register in certain circumstances; to make provision about unexplained wealth orders; and to make provision about sanctions.
Dissolution and Calling of Parliament Act 2022	2022 c. 11	24 March 2022
An Act to make provision about the dissolution and calling of Parliament, including provision for the repeal of the Fixed-term Parliaments Act 2011; (Note: Fixed-term Parliaments Act 2011 (c. 14)) and for connected purposes.
Commercial Rent (Coronavirus) Act 2022	2022 c. 12	24 March 2022
An Act to make provision enabling relief from payment of certain rent debts under business tenancies adversely affected by coronavirus to be available through arbitration; and for connected purposes.
Education (Careers Guidance in Schools) Act 2022	2022 c. 13	31 March 2022
An Act to extend the duty to provide careers guidance in schools.
Taxis and Private Hire Vehicles (Safeguarding and Road Safety) Act 2022	2022 c. 14	31 March 2022
An Act to make provision about licensing in relation to taxis and private hire vehicles for purposes relating to the safeguarding of passengers and road safety; and for connected purposes.
Nuclear Energy (Financing) Act 2022	2022 c. 15	31 March 2022
An Act to make provision for the implementation of a regulated asset base model for nuclear energy generation projects; for revenue collection for the purposes of that model; for a special administration regime for licensees subject to that model; and about the circumstances in which bodies corporate are not associated with site operators for the purposes of programmes relating to funding the decommissioning of nuclear sites.
National Insurance Contributions (Increase of Thresholds) Act 2022	2022 c. 16	31 March 2022
An Act to make provision for and in connection with increasing the thresholds at which primary Class 1 contributions, Class 2 contributions and Class 4 contributions become payable.
Local Government (Disqualification) Act 2022	2022 c. 17	28 April 2022
An Act to make provision about the grounds on which a person is disqualified from being elected to, or holding, certain positions in local government in England.
Down Syndrome Act 2022	2022 c. 18	28 April 2022
An Act to make provision about meeting the needs of persons with Down syndrome; and for connected purposes.
Animals (Penalty Notices) Act 2022	2022 c. 19	28 April 2022
An Act to make provision for and in connection with the giving of penalty notices for certain offences relating to animals and animal products.
Professional Qualifications Act 2022	2022 c. 20	28 April 2022
An Act to make provision relating to entitlement to practise certain professions, occupations and trades; and for connected purposes.
Skills and Post-16 Education Act 2022	2022 c. 21	28 April 2022
An Act to make provision about local skills improvement plans; to make provision relating to further education; to make provision about functions of the Institute for Apprenticeships and Technical Education and relating to technical education qualifications and apprenticeships; to make provision about student finance and fees; to make provision about assessments and publication of certain matters by the Office for Students; to make provision about the funding of certain post-16 education or training providers; to create offences relating to completing assignments on behalf of students; to make provision about designating 16 to 19 Academies as having a religious character; and for connected purposes.
Animal Welfare (Sentience) Act 2022	2022 c. 22	28 April 2022
An Act to make provision for an Animal Sentience Committee with functions relating to the effect of government policy on the welfare of animals as sentient beings.
Subsidy Control Act 2022	2022 c. 23	28 April 2022
An Act to make provision regulating the giving of subsidies out of public resources; and for connected purposes.
Cultural Objects (Protection from Seizure) Act 2022	2022 c. 24	28 April 2022
An Act to extend the protection from seizure or forfeiture given to cultural objects.
Motor Vehicles (Compulsory Insurance) Act 2022	2022 c. 25	28 April 2022
An Act to amend retained EU law relating to compulsory insurance for the use of motor vehicles; and for connected purposes.
Glue Traps (Offences) Act 2022	2022 c. 26	28 April 2022
An Act to make certain uses of glue traps an offence; and for connected purposes.
Approved Premises (Substance Testing) Act 2022	2022 c. 27	28 April 2022
An Act to make provision about substance testing in approved premises.
Marriage and Civil Partnership (Minimum Age) Act 2022	2022 c. 28	28 April 2022
An Act to make provision about the minimum age for marriage and civil partnership; and for connected purposes.
Taxis and Private Hire Vehicles (Disabled Persons) Act 2022	2022 c. 29	28 April 2022
An Act to make provision relating to the carrying of disabled persons by taxis and private hire vehicles.
Building Safety Act 2022	2022 c. 30	28 April 2022
An Act to make provision about the safety of people in or about buildings and the standard of buildings, to amend the Architects Act 1997, (Note: Architects Act 1997 (c. 22)) and to amend provision about complaints made to a housing ombudsman.
Health and Care Act 2022	2022 c. 31	28 April 2022
An Act to make provision about health and social care.
Police, Crime, Sentencing and Courts Act 2022	2022 c. 32	28 April 2022
An Act to make provision about the police and other emergency workers; to make provision about collaboration between authorities to prevent and reduce serious violence; to make provision about offensive weapons homicide reviews; to make provision for new offences and for the modification of existing offences; to make provision about the powers of the police and other authorities for the purposes of preventing, detecting, investigating or prosecuting crime or investigating other matters; to make provision about the maintenance of public order; to make provision about the removal, storage and disposal of vehicles; to make provision in connection with driving offences; to make provision about cautions; to make provision about bail and remand; to make provision about sentencing, detention, release, management and rehabilitation of offenders; to make provision about secure 16 to 19 Academies; to make provision for and in connection with procedures before courts and tribunals; and for connected purposes.
Pension Schemes (Conversion of Guaranteed Minimum Pensions) Act 2022	2022 c. 33	28 April 2022
An Act to make provision about the amendment of pension schemes so as to provide for the conversion of rights to a guaranteed minimum pension.
British Sign Language Act 2022	2022 c. 34	28 April 2022
An Act to recognise British Sign Language as a language of England, Wales and Scotland; to require the Secretary of State to report on the promotion and facilitation of the use of British Sign Language by ministerial government departments; and to require guidance to be issued in relation to British Sign Language.
Judicial Review and Courts Act 2022	2022 c. 35	28 April 2022
An Act to make provision about the provision that may be made by, and the effects of, quashing orders; to make provision restricting judicial review of certain decisions of the Upper Tribunal; to make provision about the use of written and electronic procedures in courts and tribunals; to make other provision about procedure in, and the organisation of, courts and tribunals; and for connected purposes.
Nationality and Borders Act 2022	2022 c. 36	28 April 2022
An Act to make provision about nationality, asylum and immigration; to make provision about victims of slavery or human trafficking; to provide a power for Tribunals to charge participants where their behaviour has wasted the Tribunal's resources; and for connected purposes.
Elections Act 2022	2022 c. 37	28 April 2022
An Act to make provision about the administration and conduct of elections, including provision designed to strengthen the integrity of the electoral process and provision about the use of the simple majority system in elections for certain offices; about overseas electors; about voting and candidacy rights of EU citizens; about the designation of a strategy and policy statement for the Electoral Commission; about the membership of the Speaker's Committee; about the Electoral Commission's functions in relation to criminal proceedings; about financial information to be provided by a political party on applying for registration; for preventing a person being registered as a political party and being a recognised non-party campaigner at the same time; about regulation of expenditure for political purposes; about disqualification of offenders for holding elective offices; about information to be included in electronic campaigning material; and for connected purposes.
Social Security (Additional Payments) Act 2022	2022 c. 38	28 June 2022
An Act to make provision about additional payments to recipients of means-tested benefits, tax credits and disability benefits.
Supply and Appropriation (Main Estimates) Act 2022	2022 c. 39	14 July 2022
An Act to authorise the use of resources for the year ending with 31 March 2023; to authorise both the issue of sums out of the Consolidated Fund and the application of income for that year; and to appropriate the supply authorised for that year by this Act and by the Supply and Appropriation (Anticipation and Adjustments) Act 2022. (Note: Supply and Appropriation (Anticipation and Adjustments) Act 2022 (c. 8))
Energy (Oil and Gas) Profits Levy Act 2022 (Note: This was the last public act of the reign of Queen Elizabeth II.)	2022 c. 40	14 July 2022
An Act to make provision for, and in connection with, imposing a charge on ring fence profits of companies.
Supply and Appropriation (Adjustments) Act 2022 (Note: This was the first public act of the reign of King Charles III.)	2022 c. 41	25 October 2022
An Act to authorise the use of resources for the year ending with 31 March 2023; to authorise the issue of sums out of the Consolidated Fund for that year; and to appropriate the supply authorised by this Act for that year.
Social Security (Special Rules for End of Life) Act 2022	2022 c. 42	25 October 2022
An Act to provide for certain social security rules which apply where life expectancy is 6 months or less to apply instead where life expectancy is 12 months or less.
Health and Social Care Levy (Repeal) Act 2022	2022 c. 43	25 October 2022
An Act to make provision for and in connection with the repeal of the Health and Social Care Levy Act 2021. (Note: Health and Social Care Levy Act 2021 (c. 28))
Energy Prices Act 2022	2022 c. 44	25 October 2022
An Act to make provision for controlling energy prices; to encourage the efficient use and supply of energy; and for other purposes connected to the energy crisis.
Identity and Language (Northern Ireland) Act 2022	2022 c. 45	6 December 2022
An Act to make provision about national and cultural identity and language in Northern Ireland.
Product Security and Telecommunications Infrastructure Act 2022	2022 c. 46	6 December 2022
An Act to make provision about the security of internet-connectable products and products capable of connecting to such products; to make provision about electronic communications infrastructure; and for connected purposes.
Counsellors of State Act 2022	2022 c. 47	6 December 2022
An Act to add His Royal Highness The Earl of Wessex and Her Royal Highness The Princess Royal to the persons to whom royal functions may be delegated as Counsellors of State.
Northern Ireland (Executive Formation etc) Act 2022 or the Northern Ireland (Executive Formation) Act 2022	2022 c. 48	6 December 2022
An Act to make provision to extend the period following the Northern Ireland Assembly election of 5 May 2022 during which Ministers may be appointed and after which the Secretary of State must propose a date for another election; about the exercise of functions in the absence of Northern Ireland Ministers; to confer powers on the Secretary of State to determine salaries and other benefits for Members of the Assembly in respect of periods in which the Assembly is not functioning; and to confer powers on the Secretary of State to set the regional rate in Northern Ireland.

== Local acts ==
Short title	Citation	Royal assent
Long title
Highgate Cemetery Act 2022	2022 c. i	24 March 2022
An Act to confer powers upon the Friends of Highgate Cemetery Trust to operate, maintain and conserve Highgate Cemetery and to extinguish rights of burial and disturb human remains in Highgate Cemetery for the purpose of increasing the space for interments and the conservation of Highgate Cemetery; and for connected purposes.
Monken Hadley Common Act 2022	2022 c. ii	28 April 2022
An Act to transfer the ownership and management of Monken Hadley Common to Monken Hadley Common Trust and for related purposes.
