= Commercial Rent (Coronavirus) Act 2022 =

Act of the Parliament of the United Kingdom

Commercial Rent (Coronavirus) Act 2022 (Note: Section 31(6).)
- Act of Parliament
- Parliament of the United Kingdom
- Long title: An Act to make provision enabling relief from payment of certain rent debts under business tenancies adversely affected by coronavirus to be available through arbitration; and for connected purposes.
- Citation: 2022 c. 12
- Introduced by: Paul Scully (Commons); Lord Grimstone of Boscobel (Lords)
- Territorial extent: England and Wales; Scotland (in part); Northern Ireland (in part); (Note: Section 31(1)–(3).)

Dates
- Royal assent: 24 March 2022
- Commencement: 24 March 2022 (Note: Section 31(4).)
Other legislation
Amends	Arbitration Act 1996; Government of Wales Act 2006; Tribunals, Courts and Enforcement Act 2007

Status: Amended

History of passage through Parliament

Text of statute as originally enacted

Revised text of statute as amended

The Commercial Rent (Coronavirus) Act 2022 (c. 12) is an act of the Parliament of the United Kingdom aimed to help commercial landlords and tenants in resolving rent arrears that arose as a result of the COVID-19 pandemic.

== Background ==
During the COVID-19 pandemic, many businesses were mandated to close in full or in part by government. At the same time, the government introduced an eviction moratorium and protection for thousands of commercial tenants. As a result, many businesses accrued debts: 33% of SMEs held debt levels of more than 10 times their cash balances, versus 14 per cent before Covid-19 hit.

As the restrictions ended on 18 July 2021, and in an effort to protect a large number of businesses from eviction and reduce the number of jobs at risk of insolvency, regulatory intervention was proposed for England and Wales. This was announced by Government on 16 June 2021 the intention is to ringfence unpaid rent that had built up when a business has had to remain closed during the pandemic. Landlords were expected to make allowances for the ringfenced rent arrears and share the financial impact with their tenants. The rent from the closure periods is now defined as protected rent debt in the bill.

The act introduced a mandatory code of practice for commercial landlords and tenants to follow. The Act gives protection for those operating under a businesses tenancy from rent debt recovery, and if no agreement can be reached, that the matter can then be resolved by arbitration.

The arbitration award can alter the principle sum owed under a business tenancy and give business tenants time to pay (up to 24 months). The act also amended the Arbitration Act 1996 under Schedule 1.

== Provisions ==
The act also outlined the period of time (6 months) in which either a landlord or tenant could make a referral to arbitration.

=== New legal terms introduced ===
- "Protected Rent Debt", is defined as being the rent, the interest, services, and insurance charged to a tenant that accrued during the relevant periods.
- "Relevant period" is defined as being from 2.00pm on 21 March 2020 until 11.55pm on 18 July 2021 (England), 6.00am on 7 August 2021 (Wales).
- "Adversely affected by Coronavirus", which is defined as, occurring during a "relevant period" and that any part of the business or the premises was subject to a closure requirement, it is not necessary for the whole building to have been closed.

== Law is passed ==
The bill was introduced on 9 November 2021. The bill became law on 24 March 2022.
