= Animal Welfare (Sentience) Act 2022 =

Legislation on animal welfare in the UK

- Act of Parliament
- Parliament of the United Kingdom
- Long title: An Act to make provision for an Animal Sentience Committee with functions relating to the effect of government policy on the welfare of animals as sentient beings.
- Citation: 2022 c. 22
- Introduced by: George Eustice (Commons); Lord Benyon (Lords)
- Territorial extent: England and Wales; Scotland; Northern Ireland

Dates
- Royal assent: 28 April 2022
- Commencement: 22 May 2023

Status: Current legislation

History of passage through Parliament

Text of statute as originally enacted

Text of the Animal Welfare (Sentience) Act 2022 as in force today (including any amendments) within the United Kingdom, from legislation.gov.uk.

The Animal Welfare (Sentience) Act 2022 (c. 22) is an act of the Parliament of the United Kingdom. It was introduced to Parliament by the Government of the United Kingdom at the 2021 State Opening of Parliament. The act recognises animal sentience in law for the first time. The scope of the legislation includes all vertebrates and some invertebrates such as octopuses and lobsters.

== Background ==
The bill was created after an original attempt to reintroduce animal sentience back into the law through the Animal Welfare (Sentencing and Recognition of Sentience) Bill 2017. Before Brexit, sentience was provided through Article 13 of the Treaty on the Functioning of the European Union which stated that states "shall, since animals are sentient beings, pay full regard to the welfare requirements of animals" when they formulate EU policies.

On the 15 November 2017, a vote was taken on whether to incorporate Article 13 into the EU (Withdrawal) Bill where it was defeated 313 to 295 votes in the House of Commons, as well as 211 against 169 for in the House of Lords.

The Animal Welfare (Sentience) Bill partly came about through the desire to separate out the two sections of the Animal Welfare (Sentencing and Recognition of Sentience) Bill, being sentencing and sentience.

== Passage ==
The bill was introduced by minister Lord Goldsmith of Richmond Park on 13 May 2021.

== Reception ==
Fears that the bill will infringe on "kosher and halal slaughter, game shooting, killing vermin on farms and testing medical products on animals" were raised in a letter written by several Tory donors. Further complaints were raised such as the notion that the UK has recognised animal sentience and that animal welfare has been around in the UK for 200 years (originally introduced in the Cruel Treatment of Cattle Act 1822). This sentiment was expressed by Nick Herbert in the House of Lords as well as by Daniel Hannan, arguing that the law is already clear on the issue.

The idea that the law in place is already enough may not be accurate since Brexit. Angus Nurse argued that leaving the EU would result in a step back in terms of animal rights, returning animals to the status of things. The reason for this is that there are significant differences between the laws MPs state as reasons for not including sentience in the law and the protections that used to be granted by EU law, in particular Article 13.

Steven McCulloch draws attention to the fact that the Animal Welfare Act fails to protect wild animals whereas Article 13 protects all sentient animals. Therefore, the firm placement of animal sentience in the law could be a step in the right direction for animal welfare according to Jessica Horton and Jonathan Merritt.

There has also been critique that the original bill did not go far enough as it fails to recognise the sentience of invertebrates. According to recent studies conducted by C. M. Sherwin, the notion that invertebrates are not sentient is incorrect, as many studies on them are conducted differently. If the same arguments from analogy were used in investigations on invertebrates then it would be concluded that they were sentient. Therefore, leaving them out of the bill may cause them to be unduly unprotected. The final bill was amended to include some invertebrate animals such as octopuses and lobsters, following a scientific review that concluded that there was "strong scientific evidence" octopuses were sentient.

== See also ==
- Animal Welfare (Kept Animals) Bill
- List of acts of the Parliament of the United Kingdom
