= Animal Welfare (Livestock Exports) Act 2024 =

Act of the Parliament of the United Kingdom

Animal Welfare (Livestock Exports) Act 2024 (Note: Section 7(9).)
- Act of Parliament
- Parliament of the United Kingdom
- Long title: An Act to prohibit the export of certain livestock from Great Britain for slaughter.
- Citation: 2024 c. 11
- Introduced by: Steve Barclay MP, Secretary of State for Environment, Food and Rural Affairs (Commons); Lord Douglas-Miller, Parliamentary Under-Secretary of State for Biosecurity, Animal Health and Welfare (Lords)
- Territorial extent: England and Wales; Scotland; (Note: Section 7(1).)

Dates
- Royal assent: 20 April 2024
- Commencement: 20 April 2024 (sections 2–4 and 6–7) (Note: Section 7(3).); 22 July 2024 (rest of act) (Note: Section 7(2). The Animal Welfare (Livestock Exports) Act 2024 (Commencement) (England) Regulations 2024, the Animal Welfare (Livestock Exports) Act 2024 (Commencement) (Wales) Regulations 2024 and the Animal Welfare (Livestock Exports) Act 2024 (Commencement) (Scotland) Regulations 2024.)
Other legislation
Amends	Animal Health Act 1981; Government of Wales Act 2006

Status: Current legislation

History of passage through Parliament

Text of statute as originally enacted

Revised text of statute as amended

The Animal Welfare (Livestock Exports) Act 2024 (c. 11) is an act of the Parliament of the United Kingdom that prohibits the export of certain livestock from Great Britain for slaughter.

== Background ==
Live animals were long exported to European Union (EU) countries from the United Kingdom (UK) for breeding, fattening, and slaughter. In 2018, approximately 40,000 cattle and sheep were exported to the EU for fattening and slaughter. In response to strong public concern about the practice, export for fattening or slaughter consistently reduced over time and the last export was in December 2020.

The Conservative Party manifesto for the 2019 General Election included a commitment to control the live exports of livestock. The government announced in the Queen's Speech on 11 May 2021 that it would be increasing protection for farm animals by ending the export of live animals for fattening and slaughter. The proposal was included in the announcement of the Animal Welfare (Kept Animals) Bill on 8 June 2021. On 25 May 2023, Mark Spencer, Minister of State for Food Security and Rural Affairs, announced the government would not progress the bill and would instead take forward some of the measures individually, including banning live exports for fattening and slaughter, as single-issue bills during the remainder of the parliament.

In the King's Speech on 7 November 2023, the government announced it would introduce measures on livestock exports.

== Act ==
The act makes it an offence to send, transport or arrange transport (or attempt to send, transport or arrange transport) for the export of live livestock such as cattle, horses, sheep, goats, pigs, and wild boar for fattening or slaughter. Poultry are not covered by the provisions. The offence applies to journeys from or through the British Islands to a destination outside the British Islands.

The provisions do not apply to Northern Ireland and journeys within the island of Ireland are not covered. However, provisions ban journeys transiting through Great Britain to a destination outside the British Islands.

There are no provisions on the import of live animals.

== Legacy ==
The Department for Environment, Food and Rural Affairs impact assessment concluded that the main loss would the inability to export sheep from the UK leading to loss of profit of £5.2 million over 10 years for exporters. The loss was a small proportion (0.02%) of all livestock slaughtered in the UK.

The RSPCA stated that the date that the bill passed the House of Lords "one of the biggest days for animal welfare in modern history".

== See also ==
- List of acts of the Parliament of the United Kingdom from 2024

== Sources ==
- This article incorporates text published under the United Kingdom Open Parliament Licence: Coe, Sarah; Ares, Elena (22 July 2024). Animal Welfare (Livestock Exports) Bill 2023-24 (Report). House of Commons Library. Archived from the original on 17 August 2024.
