= List of acts of the Parliament of the United Kingdom from 2024 =

This is a list of acts of the Parliament of the United Kingdom passed in 2024.

Acts passed since 1963 are cited by calendar year, as opposed to the convention used for earlier acts of citing the regnal year(s) in which the relevant parliamentary session was held. Each act passed in a respective year is given a chapter number (abbreviated "c."), denoted by Arabic numerals in the case of public general acts, lowercase Roman numerals in the case of local acts, or italicised Arabic numerals in the case of personal acts. These run as separate series.

26 acts of Parliament were passed in 2024: 25 public general acts and 1 local act.

indicates that an act has been transcribed on Wikisource, indicates that an act is available to view at legislation.gov.uk, and indicates the location of the original act in the Parliamentary Archives.

== Public general acts ==
Short title	Citation	Royal assent
Long title
Post Office (Horizon System) Compensation Act 2024	2024 c. 1	25 January 2024
An Act to provide for the payment out of money provided by Parliament of expenditure incurred by the Secretary of State under, or in connection with, schemes or other arrangements to compensate persons affected by the Horizon system and in respect of other matters identified in legal proceedings relating to the Horizon system.
Northern Ireland (Executive Formation) Act 2024	2024 c. 2	25 January 2024
An Act to make provision to extend the period following the Northern Ireland Assembly election of 5 May 2022 during which Ministers may be appointed.
Finance Act 2024	2024 c. 3	22 February 2024
An Act to make provision in connection with finance.
Supply and Appropriation (Anticipation and Adjustments) Act 2024	2024 c. 4	20 March 2024
An Act to authorise the use of resources for the years ending with 31 March 2023, 31 March 2024 and 31 March 2025; to authorise the issue of sums out of the Consolidated Fund for those years; and to appropriate the supply authorised by this Act for the years ending with 31 March 2023 and 31 March 2024.
National Insurance Contributions (Reduction in Rates) Act 2024	2024 c. 5	20 March 2024
An Act to make provision for and in connection with reducing the main rates of primary Class 1 national insurance contributions and Class 4 national insurance contributions.
Trade (Comprehensive and Progressive Agreement for Trans-Pacific Partnership) Act 2024	2024 c. 6	20 March 2024
An Act to enable the implementation of, and the making of other provision in connection with, the Comprehensive and Progressive Agreement for Trans-Pacific Partnership.
Pedicabs (London) Act 2024	2024 c. 7	25 April 2024
An Act to make provision for regulating pedicabs in public places in Greater London; and for connected purposes.
Safety of Rwanda (Asylum and Immigration) Act 2024 (repealed)	2024 c. 8	25 April 2024
An Act to make provision about the removal of certain migrants to the Republic of Rwanda. (Repealed by Border Security, Asylum and Immigration Act 2025 (c.31))
Investigatory Powers (Amendment) Act 2024	2024 c. 9	25 April 2024
An Act to amend the Investigatory Powers Act 2016; (Note: Investigatory Powers Act 2016 (c. 25)) to make provision about information supplied by, or relating to, the Judicial Commissioners; and for connected purposes.
Automated Vehicles Act 2024	2024 c. 10	20 May 2024
An Act to regulate the use of automated vehicles on roads and in other public places; and to make other provision in relation to vehicle automation.
Animal Welfare (Livestock Exports) Act 2024	2024 c. 11	20 May 2024
An Act to prohibit the export of certain livestock from Great Britain for slaughter.
Finance (No. 2) Act 2024	2024 c. 12	24 May 2024
An Act to make provision in connection with finance.
Digital Markets, Competition and Consumers Act 2024	2024 c. 13	24 May 2024
An Act to provide for the regulation of competition in digital markets; to amend the Competition Act 1998 (Note: Competition Act 1998 (c. 41)) and the Enterprise Act 2002 (Note: Enterprise Act 2002 (c. 40)) and to make other provision about competition law; to make provision relating to the protection of consumer rights and to confer further such rights; and for connected purposes.
Post Office (Horizon System) Offences Act 2024	2024 c. 14	24 May 2024
An Act to provide for the quashing of convictions in England and Wales and Northern Ireland for certain offences alleged to have been committed while the Horizon system was in use by the Post Office; to make provision about the deletion of cautions given in England and Wales or Northern Ireland for such offences; and for connected purposes.
Media Act 2024	2024 c. 15	24 May 2024
An Act to Make provision about public service television; about the sustainability of, and programme-making by, C4C; (Note: Channel Four Television Corporation) about the name, remit, powers, governance and audit of S4C; (Note: S4C) about the regulation of television selection services; about the regulation of on-demand programme services; about the regulation of radio services; about the regulation of radio selection services; for the repeal of section 40 of the Crime and Courts Act 2013; (Note: Crime and Courts Act 2013 (c. 22)) for addressing deficiencies in broadcasting legislation arising from the withdrawal of the United Kingdom from the European Union; and for connected purposes.
Pet Abduction Act 2024	2024 c. 16	24 May 2024
An Act to create offences of dog abduction and cat abduction and to confer a power to make corresponding provision relating to the abduction of other animals commonly kept as pets.
Paternity Leave (Bereavement) Act 2024	2024 c. 17	24 May 2024
An Act to make provision about paternity leave in cases where a mother, or a person with whom a child is placed or expected to be placed for adoption, dies.
Building Societies Act 1986 (Amendment) Act 2024	2024 c. 18	24 May 2024
An Act to make provision about the funding of building societies and the assimilation of the law relating to companies and the law relating to building societies.
British Nationality (Irish Citizens) Act 2024	2024 c. 19	24 May 2024
An Act to make provision for Irish citizens who have been resident in the United Kingdom for five years to be entitled to British citizenship; and for connected purposes.
Zoological Society of London (Leases) Act 2024	2024 c. 20	24 May 2024
An Act to amend the Crown Estate Act 1961 (Note: Crown Estate Act 1961 (9 & 10 Eliz. 2. c. 55)) to increase the maximum term of the lease that may be granted to the Zoological Society of London in respect of land in Regent's Park.
Victims and Prisoners Act 2024	2024 c. 21	24 May 2024
An Act to make provision about victims of criminal conduct and others affected by criminal conduct; about the appointment and functions of advocates for victims of major incidents; about the release of prisoners; about the membership and functions of the Parole Board; to prohibit certain prisoners from forming a marriage or civil partnership; and for connected purposes.
Leasehold and Freehold Reform Act 2024	2024 c. 22	24 May 2024
An Act to prohibit the grant or assignment of certain new long residential leases of houses, to amend the rights of tenants under long residential leases to acquire the freeholds of their houses, to extend the leases of their houses or flats, and to collectively enfranchise or manage the buildings containing their flats, to give such tenants the right to reduce the rent payable under their leases to a peppercorn, to regulate the relationship between residential landlords and tenants, to regulate residential estate management, to regulate rentcharges and to amend the Building Safety Act 2022 (Note: Building Safety Act 2022 (c. 30)) in connection with the remediation of building defects and the insolvency of persons who have repairing obligations relating to certain kinds of buildings.
Supply and Appropriation (Main Estimates) Act 2024	2024 c. 23	30 July 2024
An Act to authorise the use of resources for the year ending with 31 March 2025; to authorise both the issue of sums out of the Consolidated Fund and the application of income for that year; and to appropriate the supply authorised for that year by this Act and by the Supply and Appropriation (Anticipation and Adjustments) Act 2024. (Note: Supply and Appropriation (Anticipation and Adjustments) Act 2024 (c. 4))
Budget Responsibility Act 2024	2024 c. 24	10 September 2024
An Act to impose duties on the Treasury and the Office for Budget Responsibility in respect of the announcement of fiscally significant measures.
Passenger Railway Services (Public Ownership) Act 2024	2024 c. 25	28 November 2024
An Act to make provision for passenger railway services to be provided by public sector companies instead of by means of franchises.

== Local acts ==
Short title	Citation	Royal assent
Long title
Bishop's Stortford Cemetery Act 2024	2024 c. i	20 March 2024
An Act to confer powers upon Bishop's Stortford Town Council to extinguish rights of burial and disturb human remains in Bishop's Stortford New Cemetery and Old Cemetery for the purpose of increasing the space for interments; and for connected purposes.
