= Crown copyright =

Copyright protection used by some Commonwealth realms

Crown copyright is a type of copyright protection. It subsists in works of the governments of some Commonwealth realms and provides special copyright rules for the Crown, i.e. government departments and (generally) state entities. Each Commonwealth realm has its own Crown copyright regulations. There are therefore no common regulations that apply to all or a number of those countries. There are some considerations being made in Canada, UK, Australia and New Zealand regarding the "reuse of Crown-copyrighted material, through new licences".

== Crown copyright by country ==
=== Australia ===
The Copyright Act 1968 (Cth) (Note: Commonwealth of Australia.) (Note: Compilation no. 60 of the Act, in force as of 1 September 2021.) is the single Act mandating copyright policy for government and non-government works in Australia. Sections 176(2) and 177 of the Act provide that the Australian Government or a government of an Australian state or territory owns copyright in an original literary, dramatic, musical or artistic work:

- made by or under the direction or control of that government, or
- first published in Australia by or under the direction or control of that government.

Copyright in such copyright material subsists until 50 years after the calendar year in which the material is made (s. 180).

Copyright in legislation and court or tribunal judgments, orders or awards is not infringed by making one copy of the whole of a work or part of it, provided the copy is not sold for a price that exceeds the actual costs of copying (s. 182A(3)).

An extensive review was carried out in 2004 and the findings were published in 2005 in the Copyright Law Review Committee's report. The chief recommendation was to end the distinction between the Crown and other copyright holders. In particular, the committee was "emphatic" that the Crown should lose its unique position of gaining copyright over material whenever it is the first publisher of such material. For example, a previously unpublished short story, upon being published in a government work, would cease to belong to the author and would instead become Crown copyright, denying the author any future royalties or rights to it. The 2005 report issued by Australia's Copyright Law Review Committee supports a repeal of Crown copyright provisions, which would "respect statutory provisions respecting employer ownership of works authored by employees and contractual arrangements for assigning copyright in commissioned works." By 2009, there were recommendations to change Crown copyright, allowing Crown copyrighted works to be licensed and given open access.

In 2009, the Victorian Government used Crown copyright to deny public access to data about the Black Saturday bushfires.

=== Canada ===
Since an amendment that came into force 30 December 2022, copyright in Canada lasts for "the life of the author, the remainder of the calendar year in which the author dies, and a period of 70 years following the end of that calendar year." For Crown copyright however, there is a slight difference. Canadian Crown copyright is based on the concept of royal prerogative and "is not subject to the usual statutory copyright term". This prerogative is referenced at the outset of section 12 of the Copyright Act, which states that this section is made "Without prejudice to any rights or privileges of the Crown". Crown copyright covers all works that are "prepared or published by or under the direction or control of Her Majesty or any government department." In this way, "work produced by government departments, whether published or unpublished, may be protected either permanently or at the whim of the Crown". Subsequently, Crown copyright can be, in certain cases, "said to be perpetual...and not to lapse through non-use or non-assertion", and that a "right to certain works by prerogative amounts to a perpetual term of copyright protection". One example is where the "Arms of Canada as designed in 1921 and revised in 1957...[and] as revised in 1994...are protected under the Trade-marks Act and the Copyright Act", maintaining Crown copyright long after the normal 50-year period. Crown copyright exists for a variety of reasons, such as to ensure accuracy and integrity, to control symbols used to identify the Crown and its agents, as well as to supervise and control the publication of government works as the public's trustee.

In Canada, Crown copyright also applies to "primary law, but there are certain circumstances however when reproduction is allowed. The reproduction of statutes, consolidations of legislation, judicial reasons for judgments, and administrative tribunal decisions is covered by the Reproduction of Federal Law Order" the reproduction of primary law is also permissible as long as it is represented as a reproduction and is accurate. There is also open access online to versions of case law and statutes. Canada has implemented a variety of open data portals for GIS data as well as a geographical information licence. In Canada, open data projects can also provide some content. Aside from specialized GIS licensing, licence negotiations and agreements must be made to the Crown Copyright and Licensing department.

==== Exceptions ====
While raw data is free from copyright protection – the creation of any work based on raw data (for example, in a geographical information system) is protected.

==== E-petition and review ====
There was an e-petition submitted to the House of Commons in 2017, which asserts that the Canadian Crown Copyright protocol needs to be updated to allow access and distribution rights to Canadians. The e-petition argues that "access to government information and the ability to distribute and encourage its reuse" is critical to society. The petition also states that Crown copyright issues have prevented libraries from engaging in the access and preservation of government information. Following the 2017 petition, the House of Commons formally responded and highlighted the review of the Copyright Act, which began in June 2018 and will resume September 2018.

Specific terms and conditions are as follows:

Types of licence by jurisdiction in Canada
Jurisdiction	Type of licence	Description
Canada	Reproduction of Federal Law Order	Anyone may, without charge or request for permission, reproduce enactments and consolidations of enactments of the Government of Canada, and decisions and reasons for decisions of federally constituted courts and administrative tribunals, provided due diligence is exercised in ensuring the accuracy of the materials reproduced and the reproduction is not represented as an official version.
Canada	About Crown copyright	As of 18 November 2013, Crown copyright and Licensing is no longer centrally administered. For specific Crown copyright information, the department or agency that created the information must be contacted. This has resulted in varied approaches by different organisations, where "the non-commercial licence has disappeared from the Public Works and Government Services site and it is unclear whether it remains active", and where "some departments have denied permission or asserted Crown copyright to take down content."
British Columbia	Guidelines Covering the Reproduction of Provincial Legislation	A person may make a copy of specific acts or regulations, in whole or in part, for personal use or for legal use. Libraries may make single photocopies of specific acts or regulations, in whole or in part, in response to requests from the public, subject to the following rules: The person receiving the photocopied legislation may only use such materials for personal use or for legal use, and should be advised of this when the photocopy is provided.; Personal use refers to private study or private research. It does not include permission to make copies.; Legal use refers to reproduction of legislation within letters of advice provided by a lawyer, accountant or other professional as well as reproduction of legislation for use in judicial, administrative or parliamentary proceedings.; Legislation may NOT be reproduced by or for members of the public for purposes other than personal use and legal use without the prior written consent of the Intellectual Property Program.
British Columbia	Court Services Online – Copyright notice	The following policy governs the operation and management of the government's main Web site and all Web sites of ministries, and agencies reporting to ministries. Copyright © 2001, Province of British Columbia All rights reserved All material owned by the Government of British Columbia is protected by copyright law. It may not be reproduced or redistributed without the prior written permission of the Province of British Columbia. Court record information on this web site may not be reproduced or redistributed without the prior written permission of the court. For requests relating to the reproduction of provincial legislation, permission is subject to the conditions outlined in the Guidelines Covering the Reproduction of Provincial Legislation.
Alberta	Copyright and Permission Statement	Alberta King's Printer holds copyright on behalf of the Government of Alberta in right of His Majesty the King for all Government of Alberta legislation. Alberta King's Printer permits any person to reproduce Alberta's statutes and regulations without seeking permission and without charge, provided due diligence is exercised to ensure the accuracy of the materials produced, and Crown copyright is acknowledged in the following format: © Alberta King's Printer, 20__.* The year of first publication of the legal materials is to be completed. The official Statutes and Regulations should be consulted for all purposes of interpreting and applying the law.
Saskatchewan	Copyright notice	Materials on this website are owned by the Government of Saskatchewan and protected by Crown copyright. Unless otherwise noted materials may be reproduced for non-commercial purposes. The materials must be reproduced accurately and the reproduction must not be represented as an official version. As a general rule, information materials may be used for non-profit and personal use. There are important exceptions to this general rule: Information containing identifiable information about private citizens may only be used with the individual's permission.; Certain graphic images including the website Banners, the Coat of Arms and Wheat Sheaf are Government logos and emblematic of the Saskatchewan Government. These images may not be reproduced on non-Government materials, without the written permission of Executive Council Communications Services.; Reproduction of any materials for commercial purposes requires the advance written permission of the Government of Saskatchewan. Crown copyright should continue to be acknowledged in the following form: © 2011, Government of Saskatchewan.
Manitoba	Copyright Notification	The following statement governs the operation and management of the government's main website and all departmental websites, and reporting agencies. Copyright © 2011, Province of Manitoba All rights reserved This material is owned by the Manitoba government and protected by copyright law. It may not be reproduced or redistributed without the prior written permission of the Province of Manitoba. For requests relating to the reproduction of provincial legislation, permission is subject to the conditions outlined in the Manitoba Laws Notification web page. Permission To request permission to reproduce all or part of the material on this website, please complete the Copyright Permission Request Form.
Manitoba	Manitoba Laws Copyright Notification	Copyright on the electronic version of Manitoba laws belongs to the Province of Manitoba. You may, without charge and without requesting permission, make copies of all or part of any Act or regulation for study or research, or for use in legal proceedings or for providing legal advice. You must not make copies for any other purpose without first obtaining the written consent of King's Printer. Any copy you make must not be represented as an official version.
Ontario	Policy on Copyright on Legal Materials	The King's Printer for Ontario holds copyright in Ontario statutes, regulations and judicial decisions. The King's Printer permits any person to reproduce the text and images contained in the statutes, regulations and judicial decisions without seeking permission and without charge. The legal materials must be reproduced accurately, and Crown copyright in the legal materials must be acknowledged in the following form: © King's Printer for Ontario, 20__.* *The year of first publication of the legal materials is to be completed. The Legislation Act, 2006 sets out which copies of Ontario statutes and regulations are official copies of the law. Reproductions of statutes and regulations that are not official copies under that Act must state that they are not official versions. Reproductions of judicial decisions must state that they are not official versions.
Quebec	Normes en matière de droit d'auteur (Copyright standards)	Summary: No permission is given for free reproduction. Licences must be obtained under prescribed procedures.
New Brunswick	Copyright notice	Copyright The Province of New Brunswick, through the King's Printer, owns and retains the copyright for New Brunswick's legislation. Permission to reproduce Non-Commercial use: The legislation on this site has been posted with the intent that it be readily available for personal, educational and public non-commercial use and may be reproduced, in whole or in part and by any means, without charge or further permission from the King's Printer, provided due diligence is exercised in ensuring the accuracy of the materials reproduced. Commercial use: Reproduction of materials at this site, in whole or in part, for the purposes of commercial redistribution is prohibited except with written permission from the King's Printer. To obtain permission, mail or e-mail your request to the King's Printer directly.
Nova Scotia	No specific policy on reproduction.	
Prince Edward Island	Copyright notice	Unless otherwise specifically stated herein, all materials on this website, including text, photos, underlying HTML, illustrations, maps, designs, icons, audio clips, video clips, documents, products, software and all other content is either owned by the Government of Prince Edward Island, or the Government of Prince Edward Island has obtained a licence to use the materials for the website. The materials on this site are protect by the Copyright Act. Reproduction of any materials requires the advance written permission of the Government of Prince Edward Island, or the original creator, where applicable. To request permission, contact the web content team of Communications PEI using the website comments and suggestions form and detail your request in the comments section. Visit the Tourism PEI website for information on use of Tourism PEI stock images by industry and media. Non-commercial reproduction Information on this site has been posted with the intent that it be readily available for personal and public non-commercial use and may be reproduced, in part or in whole and by any means, without charge or further permission from the Government of Prince Edward Island.
Newfoundland and Labrador	Disclaimer/Copyright/Privacy Statement	Copyright The Government of Newfoundland and Labrador is the owner of copyright in all information found on this Web site unless otherwise stated. Where the Government of Newfoundland and Labrador is the owner of copyright in information on this Web site, government hereby grants permission for the information of this web site to be used by the public and non-government organizations. Persons and organizations using this information agree to indemnify and save harmless the Government of Newfoundland and Labrador against any claims or actions of any kind or manner resulting from its use. The Government of Newfoundland and Labrador uses multi-media, i.e. graphics, audio and visual materials, on this Web site with permission of third party copyright holders. Reproduction of such materials is not permitted.
Yukon	Copyright notice	Material on Government of Yukon web sites may be printed, copied or reproduced for non-commercial purposes only. Reproductions must be accurate and must not be represented as an official version. Reproduction or redistribution for commercial purposes requires advance written permission from the Government of Yukon. Copyright must be acknowledged in the following form: © Government of Yukon 2011
Northwest Territories	Copyright and disclaimer notice	Copyright The legislative material in the consolidations may be used for a non-commercial purpose without seeking permission, provided that it is accurately reproduced and includes an acknowledgment of the Government of the Northwest Territories as its source. Reproduction of the legislative material is permitted, in whole or in part, and by any means.
Nunavut	Department of Justice Legislative Division	The Department of Justice believes it is of fundamental importance to Nunavummiut that their laws be accessible. To ensure access to the laws of Nunavut, the following may be copied freely for personal use: the statutes and regulations of Nunavut, consolidations of the statutes and regulations of Nunavut, and; consolidations of the statutes and regulations of the Northwest Territories as amended, adopted or enacted for Nunavut as of 1 April 1999.; There is no requirement to seek permission and there are no fees to be paid for reproductions of the statutes and regulations for personal use. The electronic versions of the statutes and regulations may not be copied for the purpose of resale in this or any other form without the written consent of the Territorial Printer.

=== New Zealand ===
Crown copyright in New Zealand is defined by Sections 2(1), 26 and 27 of the Copyright Act 1994. The Crown is the first owner of any copyright subsisting in any work created by a person who is employed or engaged by the Crown, under a contract of service, apprenticeship, or a contract for services. It covers works of the King in right of New Zealand, Ministers of the Crown, offices of Parliament and government departments. The term is 100 years. Crown copyright would apply as long as no other copyright agreement had been made. In 2001, primary law and other official works were removed from Crown copyright protection. Like Australia, New Zealand is considering the implementation of open licences for works protected by Crown copyright.

==== Exceptions ====
For Crown entities and state-owned enterprises, regular copyright provisions apply instead of the 100-year term (i.e. 50 year-terms in many cases).

A term of 100 years also applies under Section 26(3)(b), with one exception, namely a 25-year term for typographical arrangements of published material. Such works produced before 1945, however, had only a term of 50 years, and so became public domain in 1995.

At common law, and under the Copyright Acts until recently, the Crown acquired title by a kind of prerogative copyright in certain books or publications such as acts of Parliament, proclamations, and orders-in-council. However, there has been a deliberate divestment by the Crown of its copyright in law – principally in consideration of the view that law should be freely available.

Section 27(1) defines a further exception to Crown copyright and copyright: bills, acts of parliament, regulations, bylaws, Hansard, tabled select committee reports, court judgments, tribunal judgments, royal commission reports, commission of inquiry reports, ministerial inquiry reports and statutory inquiry reports do not carry any copyright, regardless of age. Section 27(1) came into effect on 1 April 2001. There is, in New Zealand, under s. 27 of the Copyright Act, 1994, no copyright in regulations. Section 27(1) exceptions apply in the original work, and do not apply in terms of new typographical editions by others, nor in annotations made by organisations such as legal publishers.

=== European Union ===
While most European Union countries "exempt primary source law from copyright protection, the European Union does not have a uniform law on copyright subsistence or copyright ownership of government documents and does not mandate that laws be in the public domain" (as of 2011). The EU has also given free and open access to official government documents online for European parliament.

The UK was a member state of the EU – or its predecessor, the European Communities (EC), including the European Economic Community (EEC) – from 1 January 1973 through 31 January 2020.

=== United Kingdom ===
Crown copyright applies "[w]here a work is made by His Majesty or by an officer or servant of the Crown in the course of his duties". The Crown can also have copyrights assigned to it. There is, in addition, a small class of materials where the Crown claims the right to control reproduction outside normal copyright law under the royal prerogative. This material includes the King James Bible, the Book of Common Prayer, state papers, acts of parliament and the Royal Arms. Letters patent are issued for the reproduction of the King James Bible.

Prior to the 17th century, the executive – acting on behalf of the monarch under royal prerogative – controlled all printing and the granting of licences to printers. In 1694, the Licensing of the Press Act 1662 was refused its two-yearly renewal by Parliament after public protests against literary censorship.

The Copyright Act 1911 (1 & 2 Geo. 5. c. 46) removed the concept of common law copyright protection from British law, and it also provided specific protection for government works for the first time. Crown copyright was extended to any work prepared or published by or under the direction or control of King George V or any government department. The Copyright Act 1956 further extended Crown copyright protection to include every original literary, dramatic, musical or artistic work made by or under the direction or control of Her Majesty or a government department; sound recordings or cinematograph films made by or under the direction or control of Her Majesty or a government department and works first published in the UK, if first published by or under the direction or control of Her Majesty or a government department.

United Kingdom National archives flowchart, explaining Crown copyright. The document is itself subject to Crown copyright, but is licensed under the Open Government Licence v3.0

When the Copyright, Designs and Patents Act 1988 (the 1988 Act) came into force, the scope of the definition of Crown copyright was considerably reduced. Crown copyright was defined as subsisting when a "work is made by Her Majesty or by an officer or servant of the Crown in the course of his duties". Crown copyright was also defined as subsisting "in every Act of Parliament, Act of the Scottish Parliament, Act of the Northern Ireland Assembly or Measure of the General Synod of the Church of England". All existing works in Crown copyright were continued as such.

However, some documents have Crown copyright waived by the government, subject to certain conditions. This was introduced in a white paper in 2000 in order to improve access to government publications. This listed ten classes of documents for which "formal and specific licensing will not be necessary".

- Primary and secondary legislation
- Explanatory notes to legislation
- Government press notices
- Government forms
- Government consultative documents
- Government documents featured on official departmental Web sites
- Headline statistics
- Published papers of a scientific, technical or medical nature
- Text of ministerial speeches and articles
- Unpublished public records

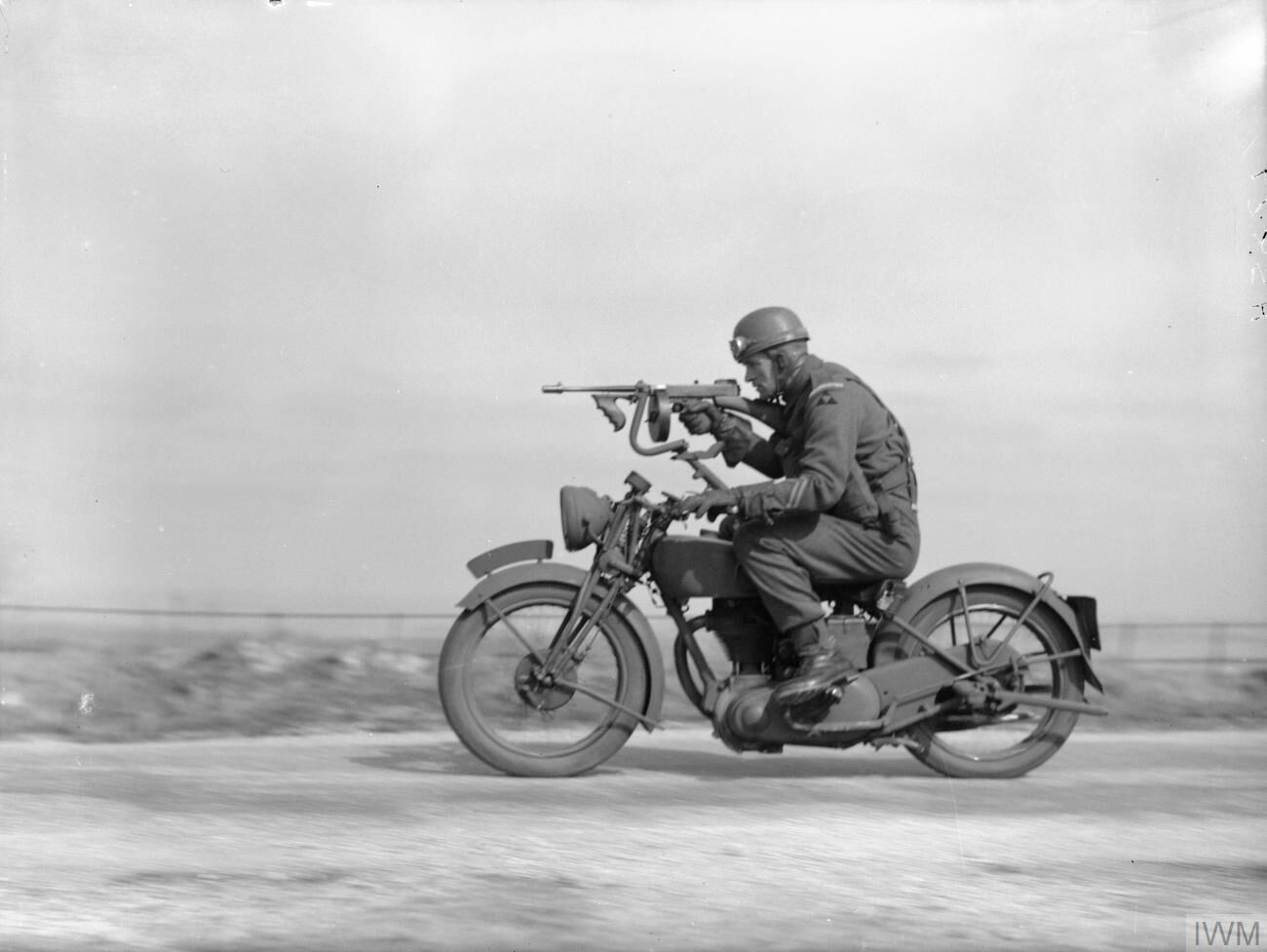
Photograph (of a Grenadier Guardsman riding a motorcycle with a Tommy gun fitted) taken in 1941 by Edward G. Malindine as part of his duties as a UK Government War Office official photographer. Its Crown copyright expired on 1 January 1992

The duration of Crown copyright varies depending on whether material is published or unpublished. Unpublished material was originally subject to copyright protection in perpetuity. However, the 1988 Act removed this concept from British law. Transitional provisions that apply for 50 years after the entry into force of the 1988 Act provide that no unpublished material will lose its copyright protection until 1 January 2040. New Crown copyright material that is unpublished has copyright protection for 125 years from the date of creation. Published Crown copyright material has protection for 50 years from the date of publication. Those works protected under Letters Patent have perpetual control of reproduction claimed over them despite being published. Where copyright in a work is assigned to the Crown by an author it is subject to the normal term of protection for that particular type of work, for example, life of the author plus 70 years for a literary work.

Crown copyright works still in copyright may be released under the Open Government Licence by the relevant rights owner or authorised information provider.

The UK government has historically charged fees for access to some Crown copyright works in order to offset costs.

In the UK there are allowances for the use of a select amount of copyrighted works (waivers), without the need for prior permission. For materials that still require a licence, there is an online application process. Like Canada, materials used must be accurately represented.

==== Parliamentary copyright ====
Acts of Parliament and works from the legislative body of the Church of England are Crown copyright. Crown copyright also formerly covered parliamentary materials, but since 1988 materials created for the House of Commons and House of Lords have a distinct status in law as being protected by parliamentary copyright.

== Criticisms ==
Crown copyright has historically been (and at times still is) perceived by taxpayers as depriving them of access to the very works they fund, and as prioritising funded business interests over otherwise regular citizens who cannot afford to license the works. The UK Government publishes most content on gov.uk and the website of the National Archives under the Open Government License.

== See also ==
- Copyright status of work by the U.S. government, by contrast, most works of the United States government are legally considered to be in the public domain
- Crown land
- Official text copyright
- Parliamentary copyright
