= Glue trap =

Type of animal trap using adhesive

A glue trap (also known as sticky trap, adhesive trap, or glue board) is a flat panel or enclosed structure, often baited, that ensnares insects, birds, or other animals with a non-drying adhesive substance. Trapped animals become unable to move, dying a prolonged death by starvation, dehydration, or suffocation. Glue traps have been utilitzed for thousands of years, including in ancient Rome, Greece, and Egypt. They are currently commonly used in agricultural and indoor pest monitoring, but criticized as inhumane and indiscriminate, trapping a range of animals in addition to the target species. They are banned or partially banned in England, Iceland, Ireland, New Zealand, Scotland, Norway, and in individual municipalities in the United States.

== Description ==
Glue traps are flat panels or enclosed structures, often baited, that are used to ensnare insects, birds, or other animals with a non-drying adhesive substance. The goal is to prevent the animal from moving, unlike traps that kill directly using poison, spring-loaded bars, or electricity. The trapped animal becomes further ensnared as it tries to free itself, and, unable to move typically die of starvation, dehydration, or suffocation. Baitless glue traps are nicknamed "blunder" traps, as insects or animals might accidentally stumble into them. Baited shelter traps such as "Roach Motels", which take advantage of an insect's tendencies to seek shelter in loose bark, crevices, or other sheltered places, often have adhesive material inside to trap insects.

Glue traps are widely used in agricultural and indoor pest monitoring.

== Criticism and legality ==
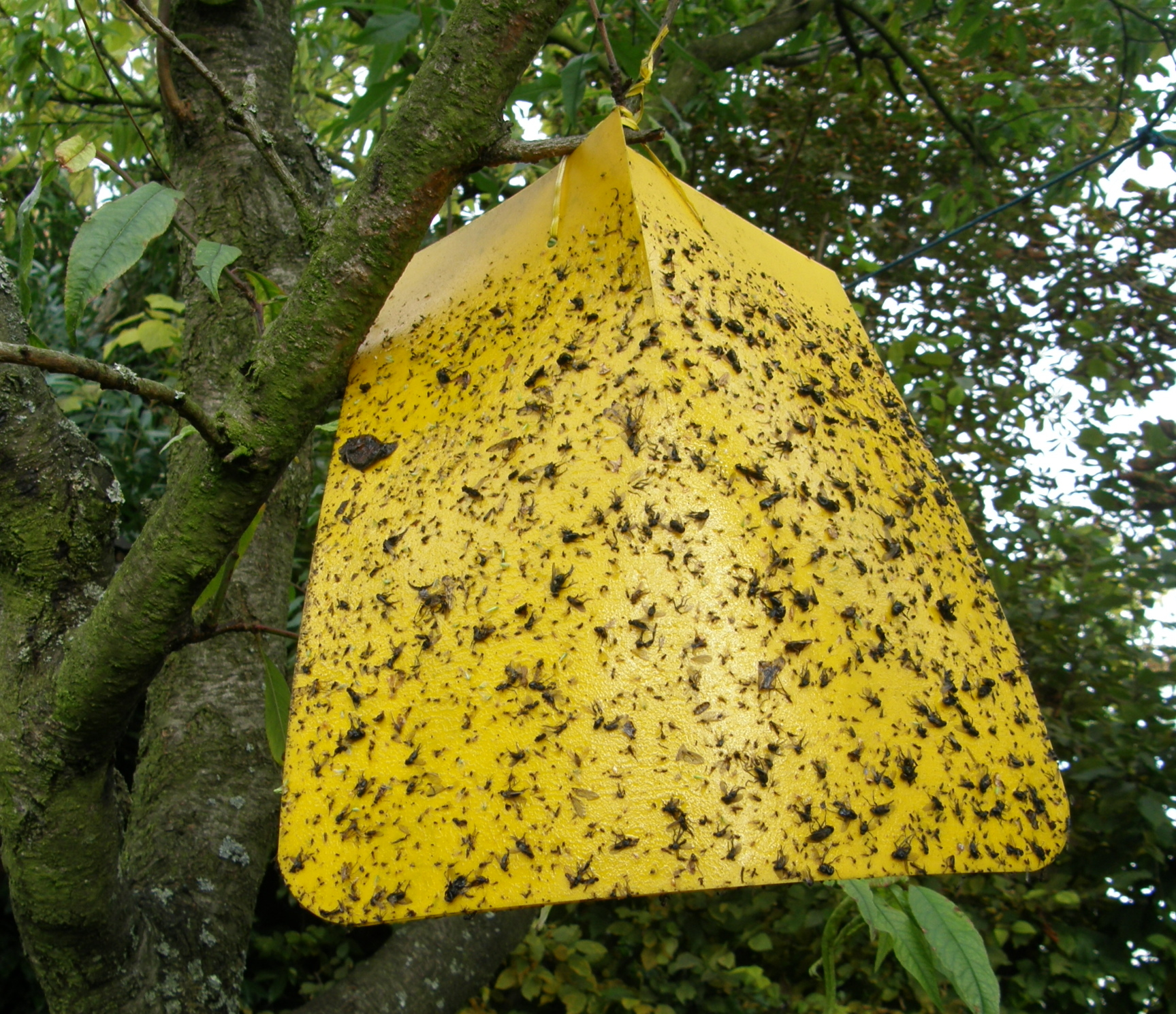
Glue trap placed outside, with a variety of insects ensnared

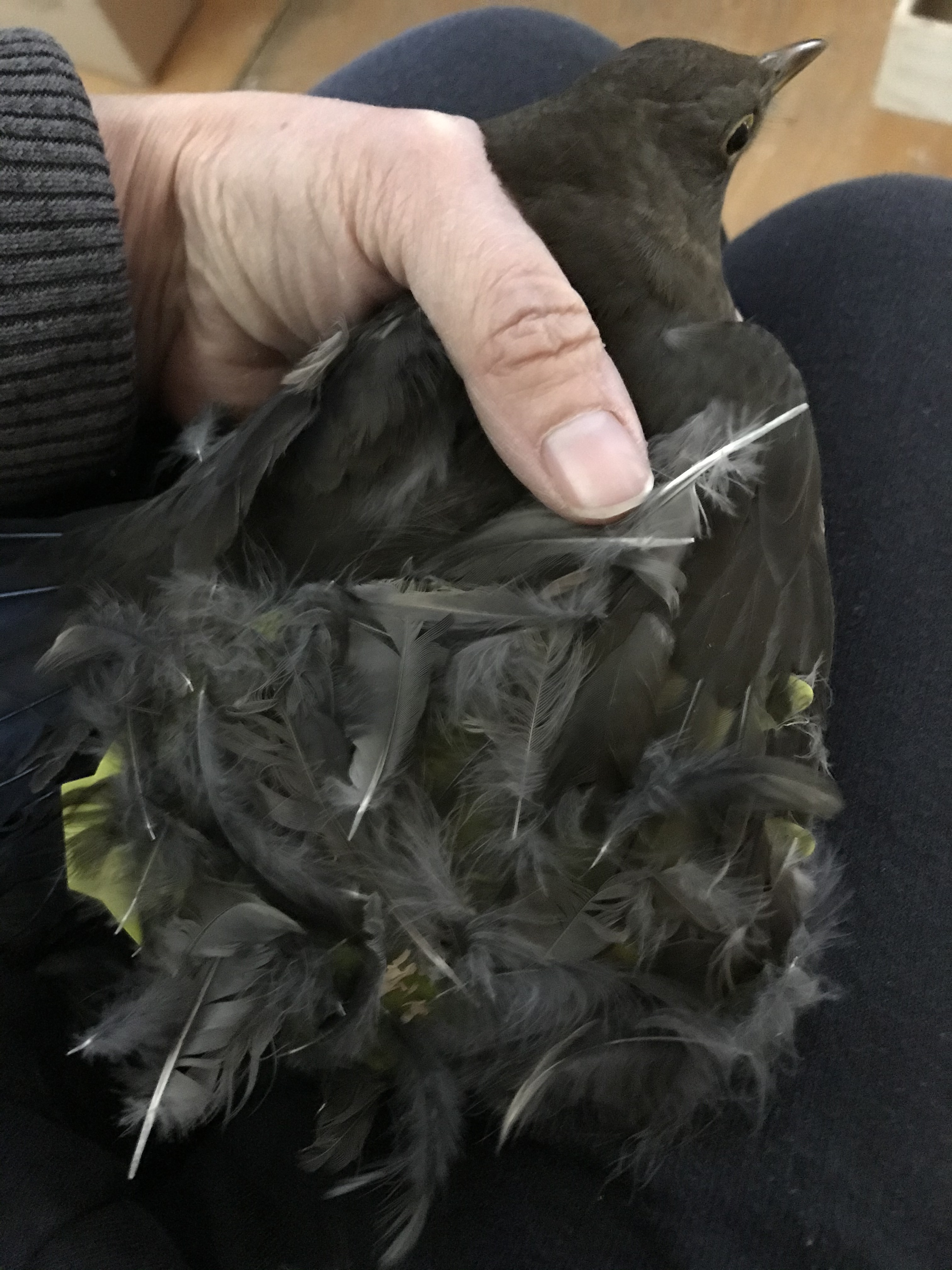
A bird taken to a wildlife rehabber after its feathers were damaged by glue trap

Animal welfare and public health advocates regard glue traps as both indiscriminate and inhumane.

The traps are typically deployed to catch one kind of insect or animal, such as cockroaches, spotted lanternflies, or rats, but also ensnare a wide range of other insects and animals, including native and beneficial wildlife like birds, bats, hedgehogs, chipmunks, foxes, lizards, rabbits, and squirrels. Traps placed on trees to catch lanternflies, for example, easily trap birds or pull off their feathers or skin.

The ensnared animals die a prolonged death, sometimes chewing off their own limbs to try to escape.

Glue traps can also be harmful to humans due to the panicked activity of trapped animals. According to the United States Centers for Disease Control, trapped rodents urinate when they get scared, which can spread diseases like hantavirus. The time it takes to die also means a build-up of waste.

Many retailers have stopped selling the traps, including Target, Dollar General, Dollar Tree, Rite Aid, Walgreens, and Wellness Forever.

Several countries ban or restrict use of the traps. In England, they are illegal to use without a license under the Glue Traps (Offences) Act 2022, although selling them in shops remains legal. They are prohibited from use against vertebrates in Scotland except when given authorization for public health reasons, and completely banned in Wales. Iceland bans glue traps as part of its animal welfare law, prohibiting "methods which cause unnecessary entrapment or pain". They are also banned in Ireland, New Zealand, and Norway. In India, restrictions have been placed by 32 states and union territories. In the United States, there have been national, state, and local laws proposed or enacted to prohibit use of glue traps. At the national level, Representative Ted Lieu of California introduced the Glue Trap Prohibition Act of 2024 (HR 7018). A similar law was proposed in New York the same year. New Hampshire considered a ban, House Bill 152, in 2025. West Hollywood, California and Ojai, California banned use of glue traps in 2023 and 2024, respectively.
