= Animal Welfare (Kept Animals) Bill =

Withdrawn proposed United Kingdom legislation

- Parliament of the United Kingdom
- Long title: A Bill to make provision about the welfare of certain kept animals that are in, imported into, or exported from Great Britain.
- Introduced by: George Eustice (Commons)

Status: Not passed

History of passage through Parliament

The Animal Welfare (Kept Animals) Bill was a proposed act of the Parliament of the United Kingdom relating to animal welfare and the export of certain animals. The bill was sponsored by the Department for Environment, Food and Rural Affairs. The bill would have specifically prohibited the export of animals for slaughter or fattening for future slaughter.

The government promised that the bill would create "the world's strongest" protections for kept animals and livestock.

Other provisions included outlawing the import of dogs with "cropped" ears.

== Legislative history ==
The Animal Welfare (Kept Animals) Bill was introduced by George Eustice, to the House of Commons and received its first reading on 8 June 2021.

=== Abandonment ===
On 25 May 2023, the government announced the bill was being scrapped, and the proposed measures contained within it would be enacted separately by other means. The bill formally fell on 8 June 2023, two years after being introduced, as per House of Commons Standing Orders.

The restrictions on keeping primates in England and the ban on exporting livestock for slaughter from Great Britain were subsequently enacted by the Animal Welfare (Primate Licences) (England) Regulations 2024 and the Animal Welfare (Livestock Exports) Act 2024, respectively.

== See also ==
- Animal Welfare (Sentience) Act 2022
- List of acts of the Parliament of the United Kingdom
