= Wildlife Management and Muirburn (Scotland) Act 2024 =

Act of the Scottish Parliament

- Act of Parliament
- Scottish Parliament
- Long title: An Act of the Scottish Parliament to make provision for the management of wildlife through the prohibition of glue traps and snares and regulation of other wildlife traps and the licensing of land on which certain birds are to be killed or taken; and for the licensing of the making of muirburn; and for connected purposes.
- Citation: 2024 asp 4
- Territorial extent: Scotland

Status: Amended

History of passage through the Parliament

Text of statute as originally enacted

Revised text of statute as amended

Text of the Wildlife Management and Muirburn (Scotland) Act 2024 as in force today (including any amendments) within the United Kingdom, from legislation.gov.uk.

The Wildlife Management and Muirburn (Scotland) Act 2024 (asp 4) is an act of the Scottish Parliament. It regulates the use of traps for animals, including glue traps, sets up new rules regarding licensing of trapping or killing birds including red grouse, and also sets up a licensing regime for the muirburn.

Landowners have called for the postponement of muirburn licensing, and wildlife groups have protested the delays. The muirburn licensing system is now expected to begin in the autumn of 2026.
