= Parliamentary copyright =

Form of copyright for Parliamentary works

See Template:Non-free Parliamentary copyright for Wikipedia's image licensing tag.

Parliamentary copyright is a form of copyright in works made by either of the two Houses of the Parliament of the United Kingdom: the House of Lords or the House of Commons. It also applies to bills proposed in either House and to the devolved legislatures in the United Kingdom: the Scottish Parliament, Northern Ireland Assembly or the Senedd (Welsh Parliament; Welsh: Senedd Cymru).

== History ==
Parliamentary copyright was first created in the United Kingdom by the Copyright, Designs and Patents Act 1988. Prior to this legislation being passed, what is now covered by parliamentary copyright was Crown copyright. Parliamentary works produced prior to 1 August 1989 are therefore Crown, rather than parliamentary, copyright.

== Application ==
Parliamentary copyright applies where a work is made "by or under the direction or control of the House of Commons or the House of Lords". Where parliamentary copyright applies, the work qualifies for copyright protection even though the usual requirements relating to qualifications for copyright protection may not apply. The House by whom, or under whose direction or control, the work is made is the first owner of any copyright in the work, and if the work is made by or under the direction or control of both Houses, the two Houses are joint first owners of copyright.

Copyright in such a work is referred to in this Part as "parliamentary copyright", notwithstanding that it may be, or have been, assigned to another person. Parliamentary copyright in a literary, dramatic, musical or artistic work lasts for 50 years from the end of the calendar year in which the work was made.

"Works made by or under the direction or control of the House of Commons or the House of Lords" includes work made by an officer or employee of that House in the course of his duties, and any sound recording, film or live broadcast of the proceedings of that House, but a work is not regarded as made "by or under the direction or control" of either House simply because it has been commissioned by or on behalf of that House. In the case of a work of joint authorship where Parliamentary copyright applies, Parliamentary copyright only extends to the portion that it applies to and not the whole work.

For the purposes of holding and enforcing copyright, the two Houses of Parliament, which otherwise only exist during the lifetime of a Parliament (and not during a dissolution or prorogation) are treated as having the legal capacities of a body corporate. The copyrights created by the act are enforceable by and in the name of the Speaker of the House of Commons, or the Clerk of the Parliaments in respect of the House of Lords.

=== Legislation ===
==== Bills in the Parliament of the United Kingdom ====
Copyright in bills introduced into Parliament belongs to one or both of the Houses of Parliament. A bill is normally introduced into one of the two Houses first, and once it is approved by one it goes to the other.

Copyright in public bills belongs to the House into which the bill is introduced, and if it is passed by that House, it is then shared by both Houses jointly. The copyright starts from the time when the text of the bill is handed in to the House in which it is introduced. Copyright in private bills belongs to both Houses jointly and starts from the time when a copy of the bill is first deposited in either House. Copyright in a personal bill belongs in the first instance to the House of Lords, and if it is passed by that House, it is then shared by both Houses jointly. This copyright only starts when the bill has First Reading in the House of Lords.

This form of parliamentary copyright ceases when a bill is granted royal assent, or if the bill does not receive royal assent, on the withdrawal or rejection of the bill or the end of the session. However, copyright in a bill continues even if rejected by the House of Lords if, by virtue of the Parliament Acts 1911 and 1949, it remains possible for it to be presented for royal assent in that session. Once parliamentary copyright starts to apply in relation to a bill, it removes any other form of copyright which might have applied.

==== Bills in other legislatures ====
The same principles apply in respect of bills introduced into the Scottish Parliament, Northern Ireland Assembly or the Senedd (Welsh Parliament), from the point a bill is introduced until it is either given royal assent, or withdrawn or rejected. In these cases, the copyright belongs to the corporate body of the respective legislature: the Scottish Parliamentary Corporate Body, the Northern Ireland Assembly Commission or the Senedd Commission.

=== Acts ===
When a bill (of the Parliament of the United Kingdom, or one of the devolved legislatures) is given royal assent by the King, it becomes an act. Royal assent is also given to Church of England measures. Parliamentary copyright ends on royal assent and instead Crown copyright commences for a period of 50 years, to the exclusion of any other form of copyright.

== Open Parliament Licence ==
Parliament operates an "Open Parliament Licence", similar to the Open Government Licence. This permits the copying, publication, distribution, transition, adaptation and commercial and non-commercial exploitation of some information to which Parliamentary copyright applies.

=== Terms ===
In order to use this licence, the user must acknowledge the source of the information by including an attribution statement and, where possible, provide a link to the licence.

The licence does not cover the use of:

- personal data;
- information that has neither been published nor disclosed under information access legislation (including the Freedom of Information Acts for the UK and Scotland) by or with the consent of Parliament;
- the Royal Arms and the Crowned Portcullis;
- third party rights that Parliament is not authorised to license; or
- information subject to other intellectual property rights, including patents, trademarks, and design rights.

This licence does not grant the right to use the information in a way that suggests any official status or that Parliament endorses the user or their use of the information.

=== Other restrictions ===
There are additional (in some cases, non-copyright) restrictions that apply to some materials related to parliamentary affairs:

- The Crowned Portcullis
- Images featured on Art in Parliament
- The Parliamentary Archives
- Parliamentary photographic images
- Live and archive video or audio broadcasts

Non-commercial use of content from parliamentlive.tv is permitted under the separate "Downloading and Sharing Terms and Conditions" of the Parliamentary Recording Unit.

== See also ==
- Parliament of the United Kingdom
- Crown copyright
