= Law of the United Kingdom =

There is no single law structure of the United Kingdom, rather, it has three distinctly different legal systems, each of which derives from a particular geographical area for a variety of historical reasons: English law (in the joint jurisdiction of England and Wales), Scots law and Northern Ireland law. As a result, there is no single unified legal system of the United Kingdom as a result of the continuation of the separate legal systems of England (and Wales), Scotland and Northern Ireland.

In fulfilment of its former EU treaty obligations, European Union directives had been transposed into the UK legal system on an ongoing basis by the UK parliament. Upon Brexit, non-transposed EU law (such as regulations) was transplanted into domestic law as "retained EU law", with an additional period of alignment with EU law during the transition period from 31 January to 31 December 2020. Retained EU law was renamed assimilated Law by the Retained EU Law Revocation and Reform Act 2023.

Since 2007, there have been calls for a fourth type, that of purely Welsh law as a result of Welsh devolution, with further calls for a Welsh justice system.

== Legal jurisdictions ==
There are three distinct legal jurisdictions in the United Kingdom: England and Wales, Northern Ireland and Scotland. Each has its own legal system, distinct history and origins, although there is a substantial overlap between these three legal systems and the three legal jurisdictions.

Unlike the other three, Welsh law is not a separate legal system per se, merely the primary and secondary legislation generated by the Senedd, interpreted in accordance with the doctrines of English law and not impacting upon English common law (except where such Welsh legislation ousts a common law rule by virtue of being a superior form of law).

The UK does not have a single legal system because it was created by the political union of previously independent countries nor has Parliament merged the legal jurisdictions (except for Wales with England). Article 19 of the Treaty of Union, put into effect by the Acts of Union in 1707, created the Kingdom of Great Britain but guaranteed the continued existence of Scotland's and England's separate legal systems. The Acts of Union of 1800, which joined Great Britain and Ireland into the United Kingdom of Great Britain and Ireland, contained no equivalent provisions but preserved the principle of different courts to be held in Ireland, of which the part called Northern Ireland continues to follow as part of the United Kingdom.

Each legal system defaults to its jurisdiction, each of whose courts further that law through jurisprudence. Choice of which jurisdiction's law to use is possible in private law: for example, a company in Edinburgh, Scotland and a company in Belfast, Northern Ireland are free to contract using English law. This is not so in public law (for example, criminal law), where there are set rules of procedure in each jurisdiction.

=== Structure and history ===
Although Scotland and Northern Ireland form part of the United Kingdom and share Westminster as a primary legislature, they have separate legal systems. (Even though Scotland became part of the UK over 300 years ago, Scots law has remained remarkably distinct from English law). The UK's highest civil appeal court is the Supreme Court of the United Kingdom, whose decisions are binding on all three UK jurisdictions, as in Donoghue v Stevenson, a Scots case that forms the basis of the UK's law of negligence.

"Great Britain" means England, Wales, Scotland, their adjacent territorial waters and the islands of Orkney and Shetland, the Hebrides and, by virtue of the Island of Rockall Act 1972, Rockall. "United Kingdom" means Great Britain and Northern Ireland and their adjacent territorial waters, but not the Isle of Man, nor the Channel Islands, whose independent status was discussed in Rover International Ltd. v Canon Film Sales Ltd. (1987) and Chloride Industrial Batteries Ltd. v F. & W. Freight Ltd. (1989). "British Islands" – but not "British Isles" – means the United Kingdom, the Isle of Man and the Channel Islands.

The first schedule of the Interpretation Act 1978, defines the following terms: "British Islands", "England", and "United Kingdom". The use of the term "British Isles" is virtually obsolete in statutes and, when it does appear, it is taken to be synonymous with "British Islands". For interpretation purposes, England includes a number of specified elements:

- Wales and Berwick Act 1746, section 3 (entire act now repealed) formally incorporated Wales and Berwick-upon-Tweed into England. But section 4 Welsh Language Act 1967 provided that references to England in future acts of Parliament should no longer include Wales (see now Interpretation Act 1978, schedule 3, part 1). But Dicey & Morris say (at p28) "It seems desirable to adhere to Dicey's (the original) definition for reasons of convenience and especially of brevity. It would be cumbersome to have to add "or Wales" after "England" and "or Welsh" after "English" every time those words are used."
- the "adjacent islands" of the Isle of Wight and Anglesey are a part of England and Wales by custom, while Harman v Bolt (1931) expressly confirms that Lundy is a part of England.
- the "adjacent territorial waters" by virtue of the Territorial Waters Jurisdiction Act 1878 and the Continental Shelf Act 1964 as amended by the Oil and Gas (Enterprise) Act 1982.

=== England and Wales ===
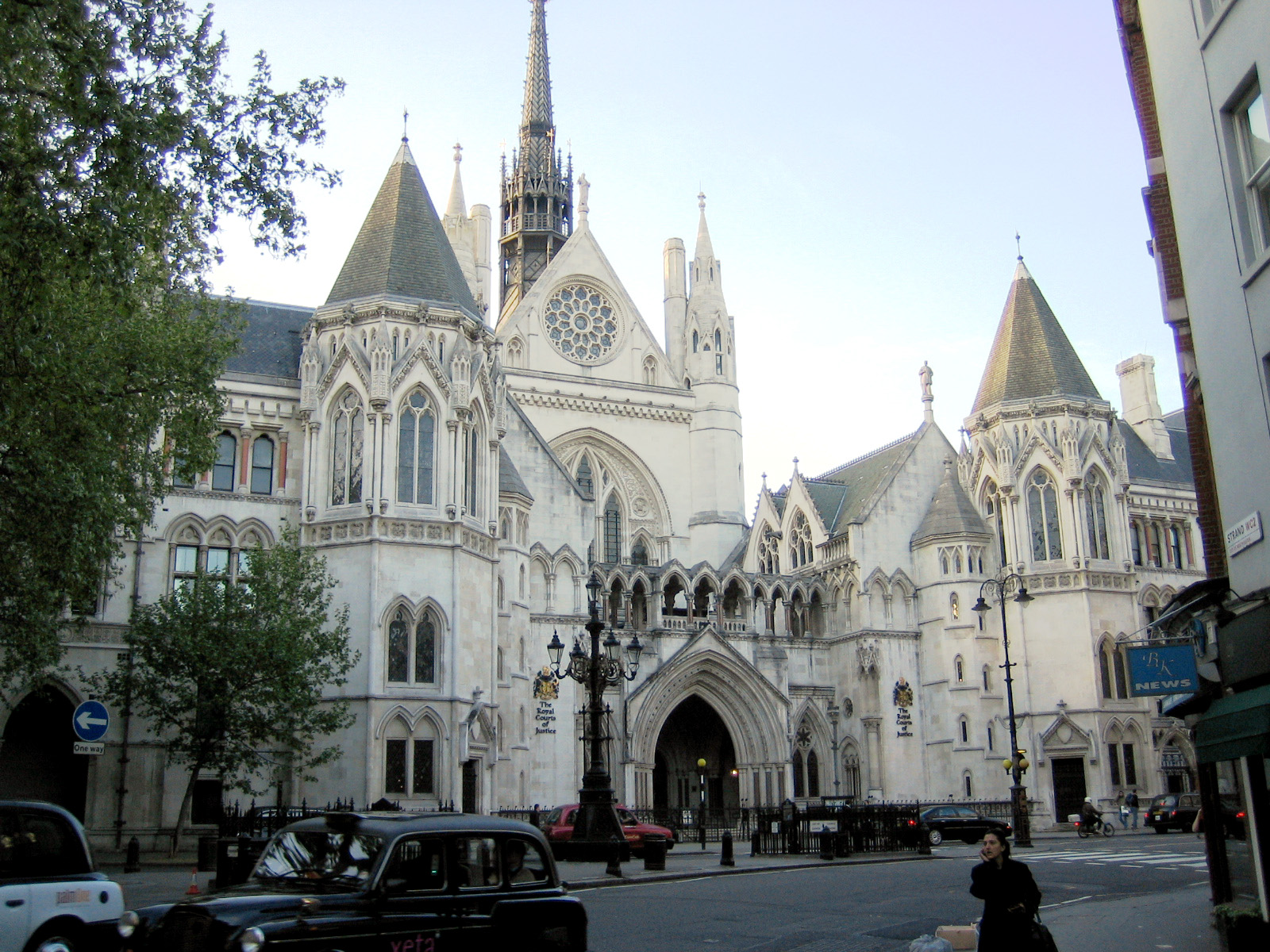
The Royal Courts of Justice in London, home of the Senior Courts of England and Wales

English and Welsh law (or just English law) refers to the legal system administered by the courts in England and Wales, which rule on both civil and criminal matters. English and Welsh law is based on the principles of common law. English and Welsh law can be described as having its own legal doctrine, distinct from civil law legal systems since 1189.

There has been no major codification of the law, rather the law is developed by judges in court, applying statute, precedent and case-by-case reasoning to give explanatory judgments of the relevant legal principles. These judgments are binding in future similar cases (stare decisis), and for this reason are often reported in law reports.

The courts of England and Wales are headed by the Senior Courts of England and Wales, consisting of the Court of Appeal, the High Court of Justice (for civil cases) and the Crown Court (for criminal cases). The Supreme Court is the highest court in the land for both criminal and civil appeal cases in England and Wales (also in Northern Ireland cases and civil cases in Scots law) and any decision it makes is binding on every other court in the same jurisdiction, and often has persuasive effect in its other jurisdictions.

On appeal, a court may overrule the decisions of its inferior courts, such as county courts (civil) and magistrates' courts (criminal). The High Court may also quash on judicial review both administrative decisions of the Government and delegated legislation. Before the Supreme Court of the United Kingdom was created in October 2009, the highest appellate body was the Appellate Committee of the House of Lords, usually just referred to as "The House of Lords".

After the Acts of Union, in 1707 English law became one of two legal systems in different parts of the same United Kingdom and has been influenced by Scots law, most notably in the development and integration of the law merchant by Lord Mansfield and in time the development of the law of negligence. Scottish influence may have influenced the abolition of the forms of action in the nineteenth century and extensive procedural reforms in the twentieth. Since the accession of the United Kingdom to the European Communities in 1973, English law has also been affected by European law under the Treaty of Rome.

==== Wales ====
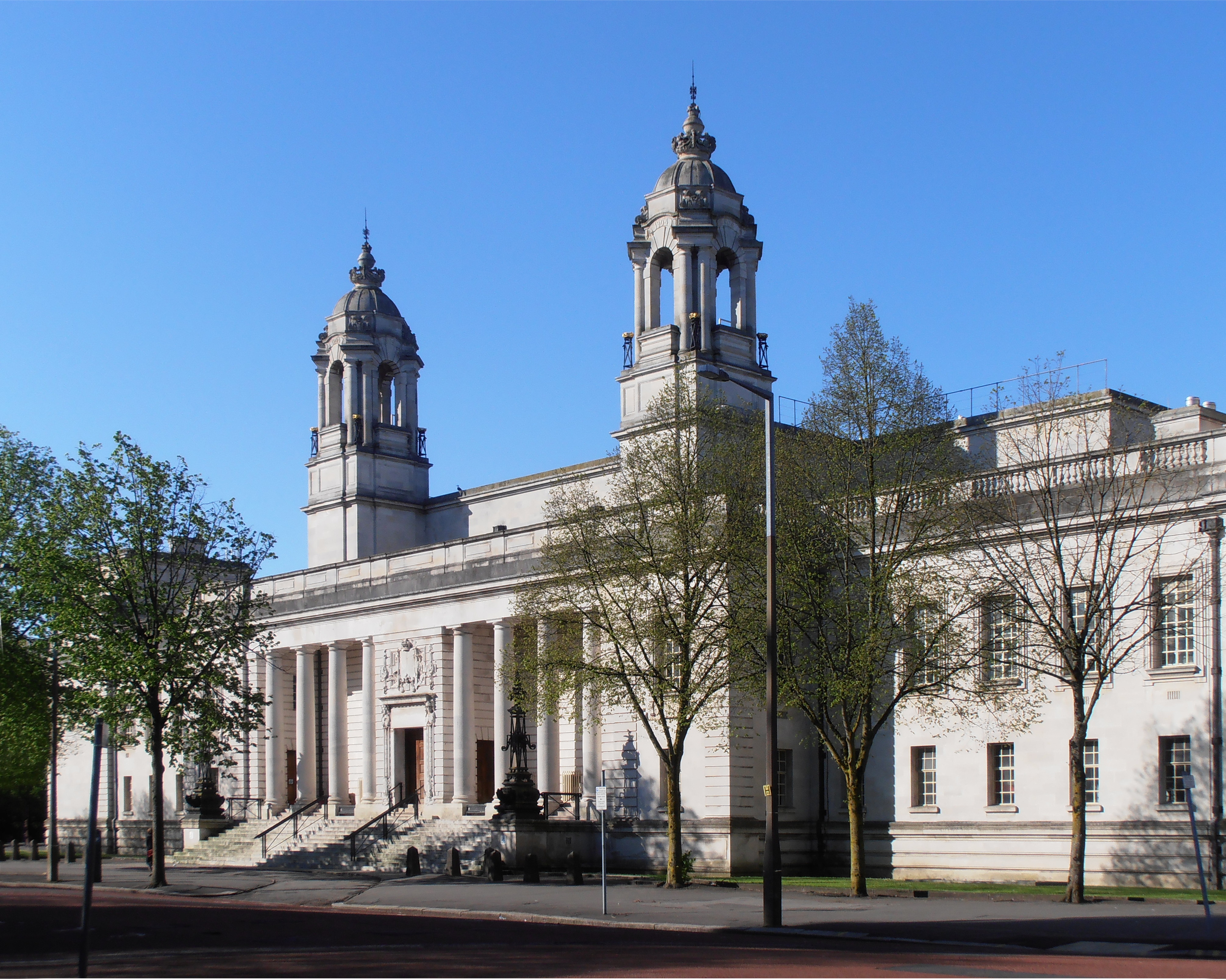
The main entrance to Cardiff Crown Court

Welsh law is the primary and secondary legislation generated by the Senedd, using the devolved authority granted in the Government of Wales Act 2006, amended substantially by Wales Act 2014 and Wales Act 2017, and in effect since May 2007. Each piece of Welsh legislation is known as an Act of Senedd Cymru.

As there is no criminal law within contemporary Welsh law, Wales is not generally considered a fourth jurisdiction of the United Kingdom. This is because the judiciary and the courts follow England and Wales law, which is made by the Parliament at Westminster, and is not specific to Wales. Although Welsh law is recognised as separate in operation, this is not sufficient for Wales to constitute a separate legal jurisdiction.

A commission set up in 2017 by the First Minister of Wales known as "The Commission on Justice in Wales" and chaired by Lord Thomas of Cwmgiedd, looked into the operation of justice in the country. Its aim was to further clarify the legal and political identity of Wales within the UK constitution. The commission's report was released in October 2019 and recommended the full devolution of the justice system. This would formalise Wales as the fourth jurisdiction of the UK.

There have been multiple calls from both academics and politicians however for a Wales criminal justice system.

=== Northern Ireland ===
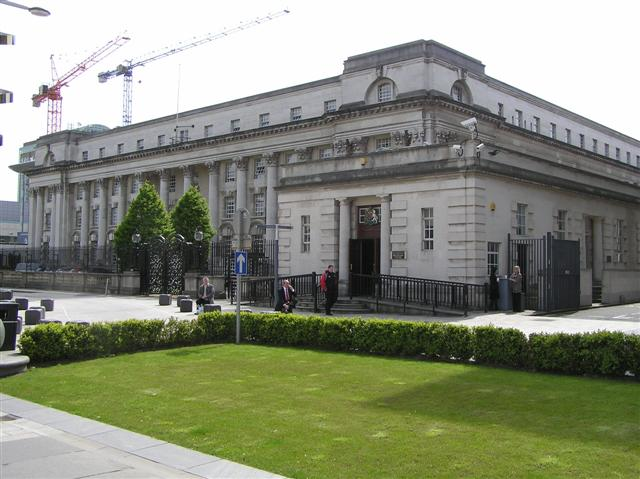
The Royal Courts of Justice in Belfast, Northern Ireland

The law of Northern Ireland is a common law system. It is administered by the courts of Northern Ireland, with ultimate appeal to the Supreme Court of the United Kingdom in both civil and criminal matters. The law of Northern Ireland is closely similar to English law, the rules of common law having been imported into the Kingdom of Ireland under English rule. However, there are important differences.

The sources of the law of Northern Ireland are Irish common law, and statute law. Of the latter, statutes of the Parliaments of Ireland, of the United Kingdom and of Northern Ireland are in force, and latterly statutes of the devolved Northern Ireland Assembly. The courts of Northern Ireland are headed by the Court of Judicature of Northern Ireland, consisting of the Northern Ireland Court of Appeal, the Northern Ireland High Court of Justice and the Northern Ireland Crown Court.

Below that are county courts and magistrates' courts. The Supreme Court is the highest court in the land for both criminal and civil appeal cases in Northern Ireland and any decision it makes is binding on every other court in the same jurisdiction and often has persuasive effect in its other jurisdictions.

=== Scotland ===
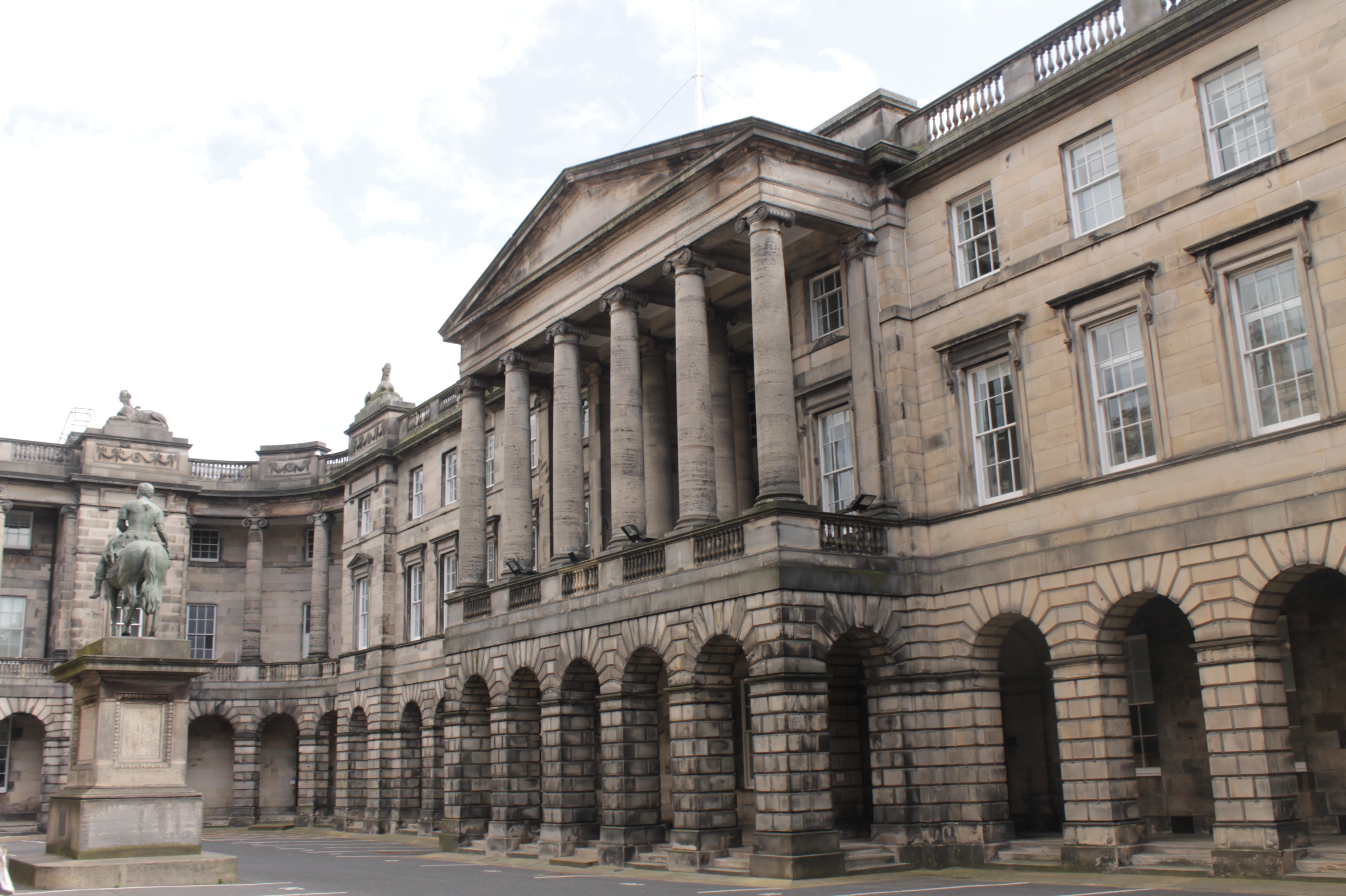
Parliament House in Edinburgh is the seat of the Supreme Courts of Scotland.

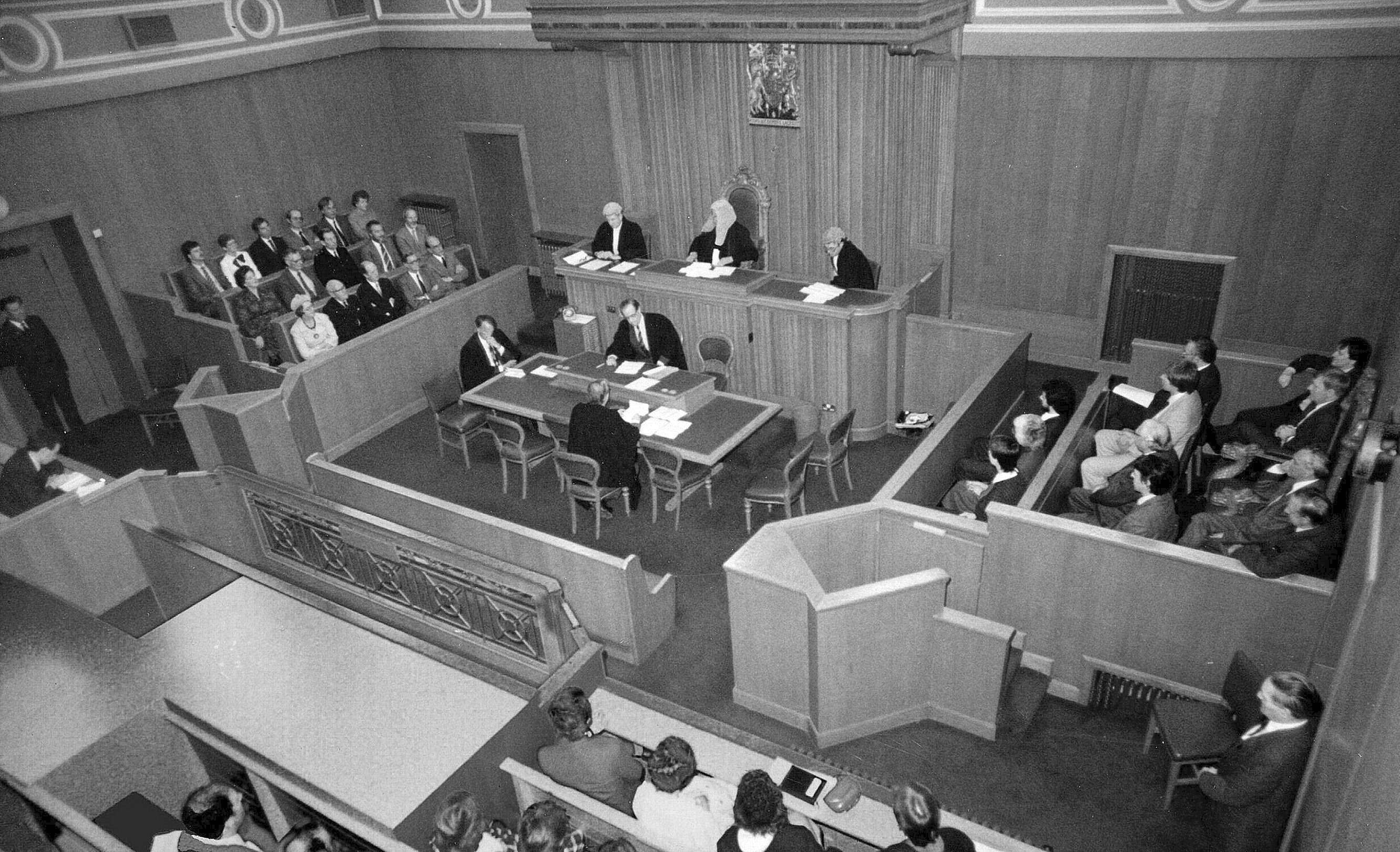
A session of a Sheriff Court in operation in Dundee

Scots law is a unique legal system with an ancient basis in Roman law. Grounded in uncodified civil law dating back to the Corpus Juris Civilis, it also features elements of common law with medieval sources. Thus Scotland has a pluralistic, or 'mixed', legal system, comparable to that of South Africa, and, to a lesser degree, the partly codified pluralistic systems of Louisiana and Quebec.

Upon the formation of the Kingdom of Great Britain under the 1707 Acts of Union, Scots law shared a legislature with England and Wales. While each retained fundamentally different legal systems, the 1707 Union brought English and Welsh influence upon Scots law, and vice versa. Since the accession of the United Kingdom to the European Communities in 1973, Scots law has been affected by European law under the Treaty of Rome. The establishment of the Scottish Parliament and creation of the Scottish Government in 1999, which legislates on all matters within domestic areas of legislative competence, has created a further major source of Scots law.

Under the UK Withdrawal from the European Union (Continuity) (Scotland) Act 2020 following the withdrawal of the United Kingdom from the European Union in 2020 it is required that devolved Scots law has to stay in alignment with future EU law despite the virtue of no longer being a member state.

The chief courts are the Court of Session, for civil cases, and the High Court of Justiciary, for criminal cases. The Supreme Court of the United Kingdom serves as the highest court of appeal for civil cases under Scots law, with leave to appeal from the Court of Session not required as a general rule. However, unlike in the rest of the United Kingdom, the Supreme Court of the United Kingdom has no role as the highest court of appeal for Scottish criminal cases: this is forbidden by Article XIX of the Treaty of Union between Scotland and England.

Sheriff courts deal with most civil and criminal cases including conducting criminal trials with a jury, known as sheriff solemn court, or with a sheriff and no jury, known as sheriff summary court. The sheriff courts provide a local court service with 49 sheriff courts organised across six sheriffdoms. The Scottish legal system is unique in having three possible verdicts for a criminal trial: "guilty", "not guilty" and "not proven". Both "not guilty" and "not proven" result in an acquittal with no possibility of retrial. In very rare circumstances, the High Court of Justiciary can create new criminal offences without reference to Parliament, using its declaratory power to do so.

The Cabinet Secretary for Justice is the member of the Scottish Government responsible for Police Scotland, the courts and criminal justice, and the Scottish Prison Service, which manages the prisons in Scotland.

== Assimilated law ==
Assimilated law previously referred to as Retained EU law (REUL) is a category of law in the United Kingdom created at the end of the transition period following the UK's withdrawal from the EU. Assimilated law includes EU legislation which was "cut and pasted" into domestic law, along with certain domestic laws whose role was to implement EU regulations and directives. The objective of Assimilated law is to maintain "legislative continuity".

== Courts and tribunals ==
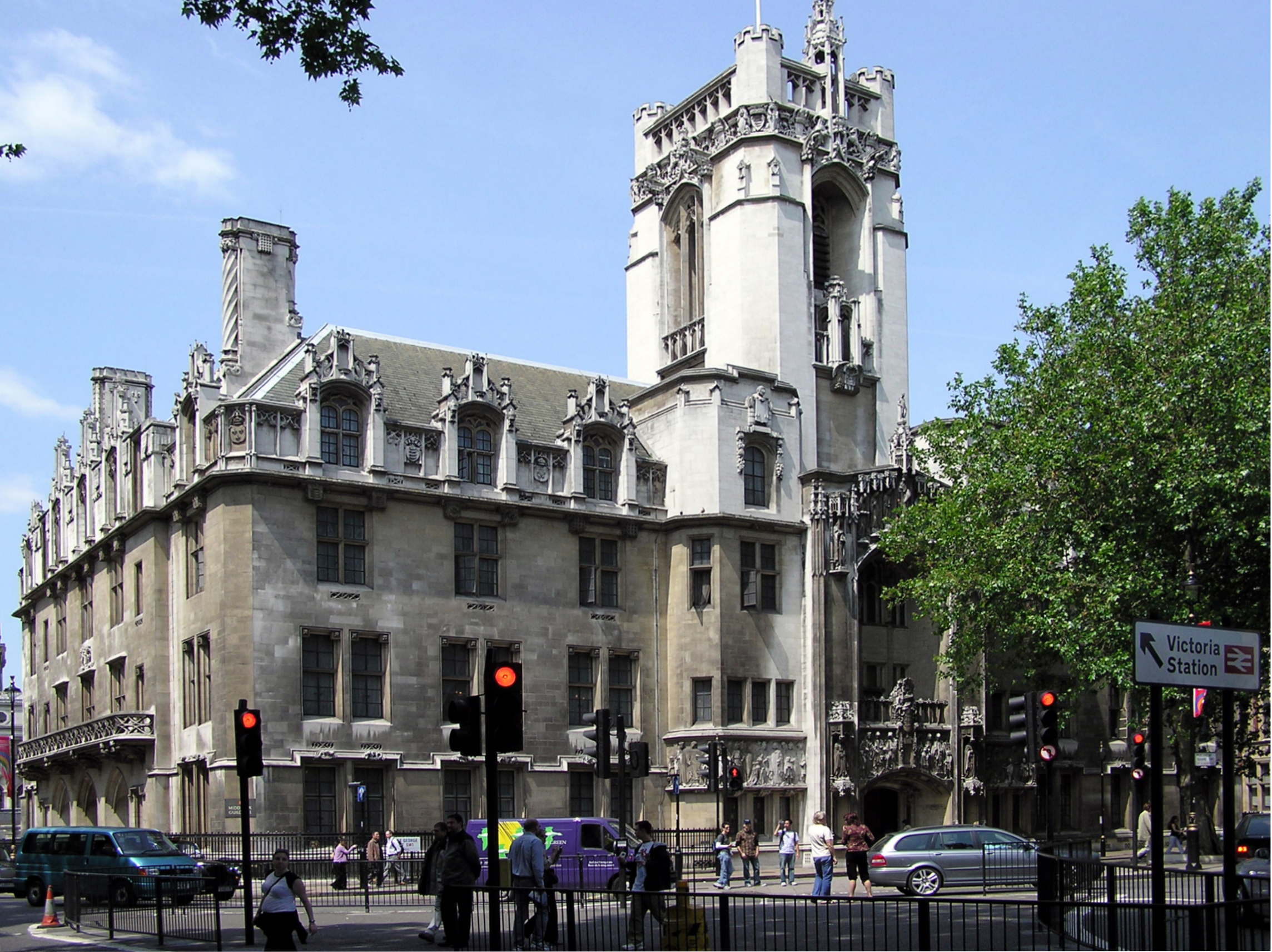
The Middlesex Guildhall is home to the Supreme Court of the United Kingdom.

The Supreme Court of the United Kingdom is the highest court in the UK for all criminal and civil cases in England and Wales and Northern Ireland, and for all civil cases in Scots law. The Supreme Court is the final court, in the normal sense of the term, for interpreting United Kingdom law. Unlike in some other systems, for example, the United States, the Supreme Court cannot strike down statutes. Its precedents can be expressly overridden by Parliament, by virtue of the doctrine of parliamentary sovereignty. The Supreme Court came into being in October 2009, replacing the Appellate Committee of the House of Lords.

In England and Wales, the court system is headed by the Senior Courts of England and Wales, consisting of the Court of Appeal, the High Court of Justice (for civil cases) and the Crown Court (for criminal cases). The Courts of Northern Ireland follow the same pattern.

In Scotland, the chief courts are the Court of Session, for civil cases, and the High Court of Justiciary, for criminal cases. Sheriff courts, as they deal with both criminal and civil caseloads, have no equivalent outside Scotland.

Certain tribunals for administrative law cases have UK-wide jurisdiction, notably those dealing with immigration—the Upper Tribunal (Immigration and Asylum Chamber) and Special Immigration Appeals Commission—military and national security, competition and intellectual property, and a few others. Similarly, the Employment Appeal Tribunal has jurisdiction throughout Great Britain but not in Northern Ireland.

The Judicial Committee of the Privy Council is the highest court of appeal for several independent Commonwealth countries, the British Overseas Territories, and the British Crown Dependencies.

== United Kingdom legislatures ==
=== United Kingdom Parliament ===
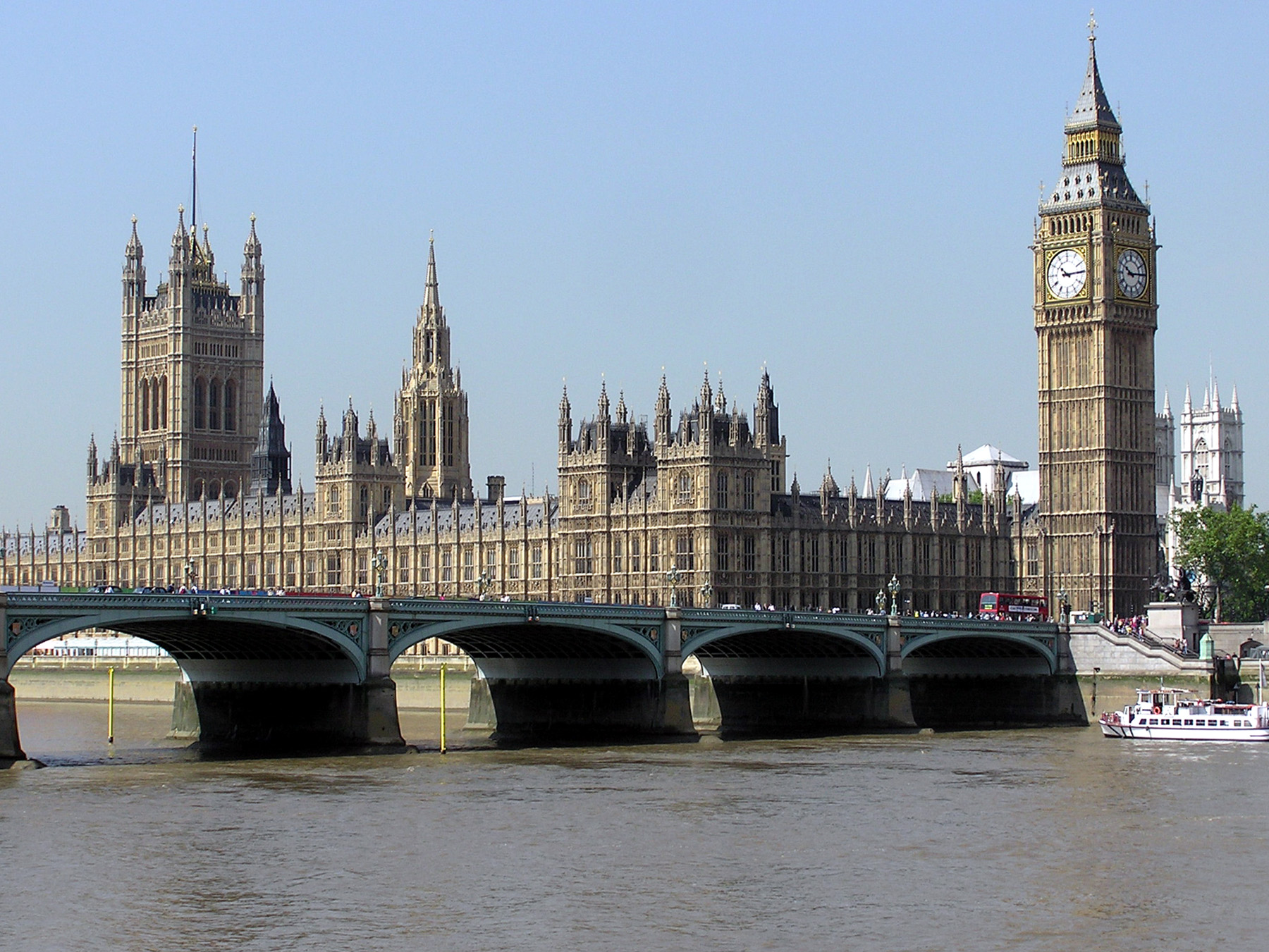
The Houses of Parliament, as seen over Westminster Bridge

The Parliament of the United Kingdom is bicameral, with an upper house – the House of Lords, and a lower house – the House of Commons. In addition to the two houses, the King is also a component of Parliament.

The House of Lords includes two different types of members: The Lords Spiritual (the senior bishops of the Church of England) and the Lords Temporal (members of the Peerage). Its members are not elected by the population at large.

The House of Commons is a democratically elected chamber. The two Houses meet in separate chambers in the Palace of Westminster, commonly known as the "Houses of Parliament", in the City of Westminster in London. By constitutional convention, all government ministers, including the Prime Minister, are members of the House of Commons or House of Lords.

Parliament evolved from the early medieval councils that advised the sovereigns of England and Scotland. The King, Lords, and Commons acting together to legislate may be described as the King-in-Parliament. The King-in-Parliament is, according to the doctrine of parliamentary sovereignty, completely sovereign with the power to make and unmake any law other than to bind itself.

Real power is vested in the House of Commons. The Sovereign acts only as a figurehead and the powers of the House of Lords are greatly limited. The parliament retains some law-making powers for some jurisdictions outside of the United Kingdom proper.

=== Northern Ireland Assembly ===
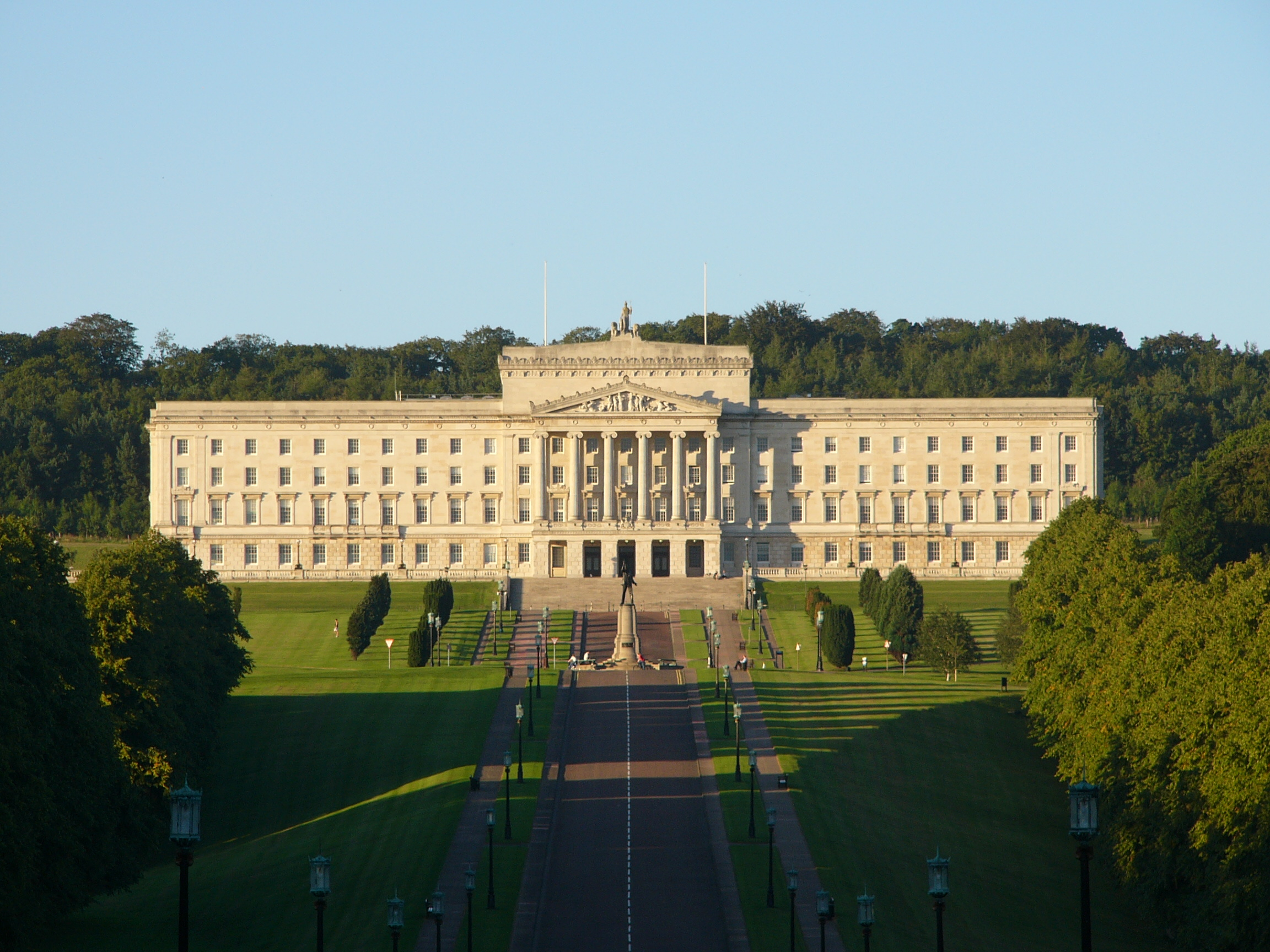
Parliament Buildings, Stormont, Northern Ireland

The Northern Ireland Assembly (Irish: Tionól Thuaisceart Éireann, Ulster Scots: Norlin Airlann Semmlie) is the devolved legislature of Northern Ireland. It has power to legislate in a wide range of areas that are not explicitly reserved to the Parliament of the United Kingdom, and to appoint the Northern Ireland Executive. It sits at Parliament Buildings at Stormont in Belfast.

The latest incarnation of the Assembly was established under the Good Friday Agreement of 1998, an accord aimed at bringing an end to Northern Ireland's violent 30-year Troubles. It is based on the principle of power-sharing under the D'Hondt method to ensure that Northern Ireland's largest political communities, the unionist and nationalist communities both participate in governing the region.

The Assembly is a unicameral, democratically elected body comprising 90 members who are known as Members of the Legislative Assembly, or MLAs. Members are elected under the single transferable vote form of proportional representation.

=== Scottish Parliament ===
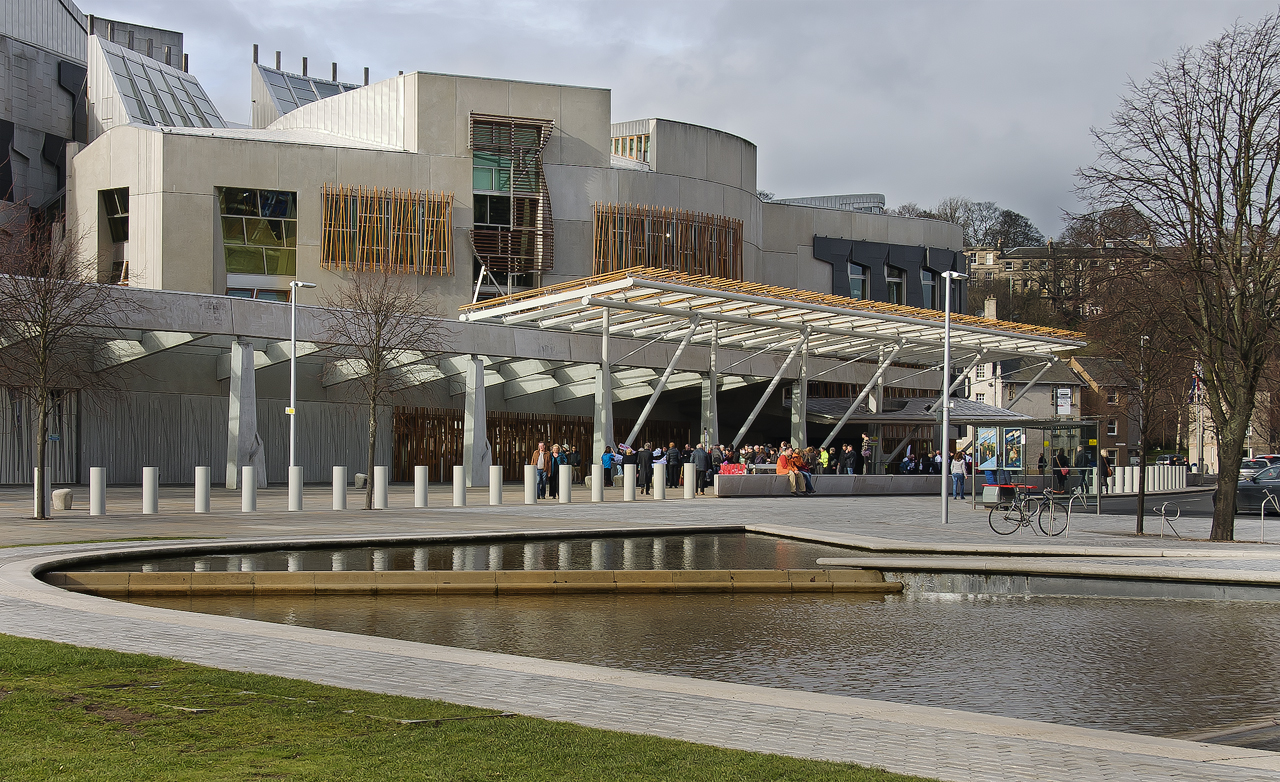
The distinctive Scottish Parliament building, opened in October 2004

The Scottish Parliament (Scottish Gaelic: Pàrlamaid na h-Alba; Scots: Scots Pairlament) is located in the Holyrood area of the capital Edinburgh. The Parliament, which is informally referred to as "Holyrood" (cf. "Westminster"), is a democratically elected body of 129 members who are known as Members of the Scottish Parliament or MSPs. Members are elected for four-year terms under the Additional Member System of proportional representation.

73 MSPs represent individual geographical constituencies elected by the plurality voting system ("first past the post"). A further 56 are returned from eight additional member regions, each electing seven MSPs. The Scottish Parliament, as it was created by devolution and an act of parliament, does not get its legislative powers by virtue of sovereignty or by virtue of 'being the Scottish Parliament'. It legally exists as a subset of Westminster and derives its powers as such.

The original Parliament of Scotland (or "Estates of Scotland") was the national legislature of the independent Kingdom of Scotland and existed from the early thirteenth century until the Kingdom of Scotland merged with the Kingdom of England under the Acts of Union 1707 to form the Kingdom of Great Britain. As a consequence, the Parliament of Scotland merged with the Parliament of England, to form the Parliament of Great Britain, which sat at Westminster in London.

=== Senedd ===
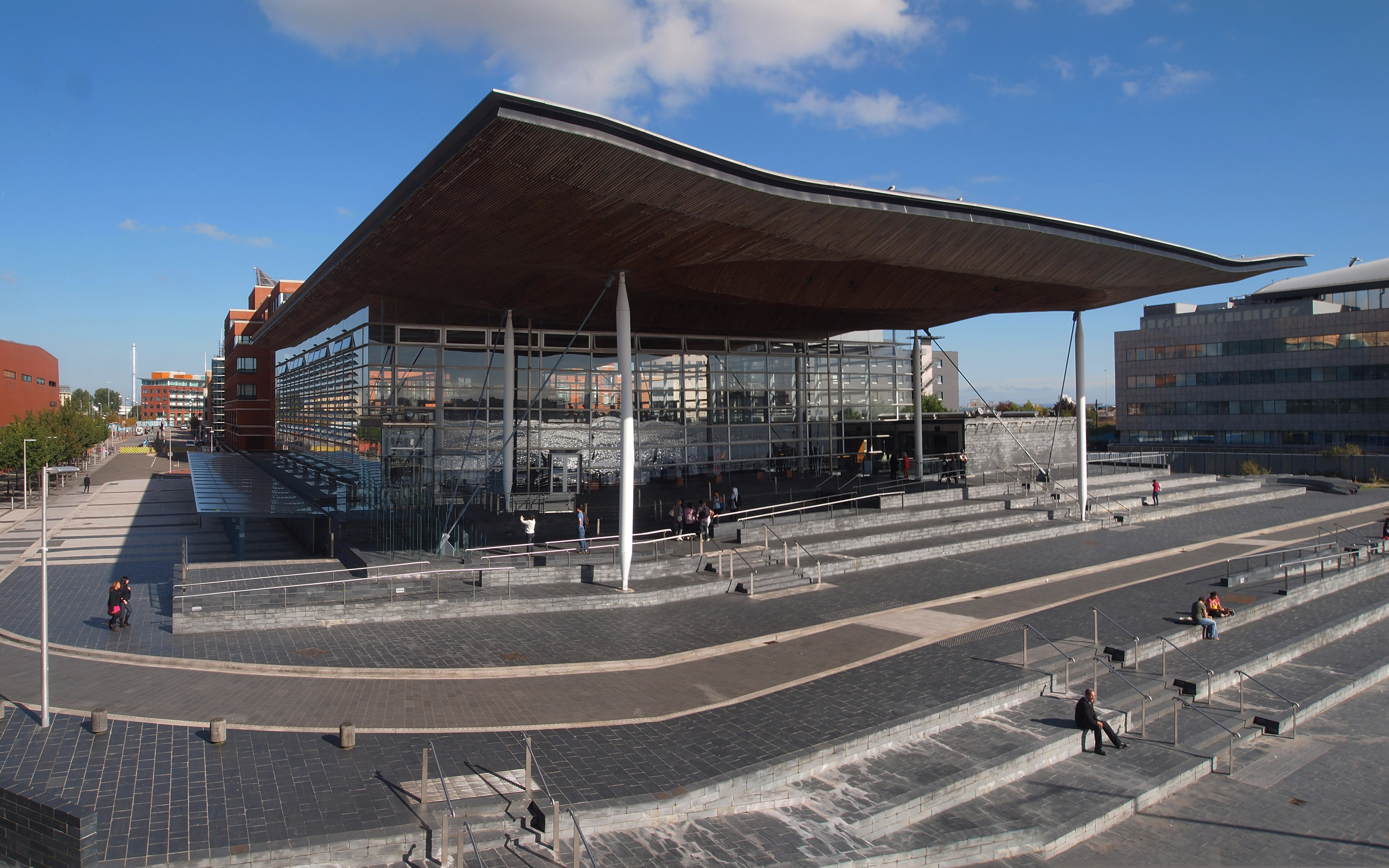
The Senedd building in Cardiff, seat of the Senedd, the Welsh Parliament

Since 2007, the Senedd (Welsh Parliament; Welsh: Senedd Cymru), previously known as the 'National Assembly for Wales', has been invested with legislative powers. It is situated in Cardiff. The Senedd, first elected in 1999, is a democratically elected body of 60 members who are known as Members of the Senedd or MSs. Members are elected for five-year terms under the Additional Member System of proportional representation. 40 MSs represent individual geographical constituencies elected by the plurality voting system ("first past the post"). 20 are returned from five additional member regions. Each region elects four MSs.

== Related legal systems ==
After centuries of settlement and conquest, the United Kingdom has legal relationships to many territories outside its borders. These include sovereign states that do and do not share a monarch and judicial institutions with the UK, and dependencies where the UK government, parliament, and crown do retain some power.

=== Independent sovereign states with British legal history ===
Most countries that have gained independence from the UK are no longer subject to the British parliament, monarchy, or courts. They consist of a mix of republics (for example Ireland and India) and local monarchies (for example Kuwait and Brunei) with no relationship to the royal House of Windsor. The colonies and possessions were created and separated from the UK under a wide variety of circumstances, resulting in a spectrum of influence of British law in domestic law.

At the strongly influenced end of the spectrum, for example, is the United States. The Royal Proclamation of 1763 explicitly applied English Common Law to all British overseas colonies, and affirmed some degree of local law-making. The American Revolutionary War resulted in a unilateral separation recognized by the Peace of Paris (1783), but the English system continued to be used as the basis for court decisions. Over time, it was modified by the United States Constitution, state constitutions, and federal and state court decisions particular to their own jurisdictions. Colonial land grants of the British kings still remained relevant in some later boundary disputes of the former Thirteen Colonies, though adjudicated by the Supreme Court of the United States. Some parts of the United States not subject to British rule have laws based on other traditions, such as French civil law in Louisiana, and Native American law in areas of tribal sovereignty.

Some countries were granted independence by an act of the UK parliament (for example, the Statute of Westminster 1931) and have likewise diverged from UK law either under or after British rule. An example at the other end of the spectrum, despite occasional control for geopolitical reasons, British law had little impact on the law of Afghanistan.

=== Independent sovereign states with shared institutions ===
By special agreement, the UK-based Judicial Committee of the Privy Council acts as the court of highest appeal for three former colonies which are now republics (Mauritius, Trinidad and Tobago, and for constitutional rights, Kiribati) and has a special consultation agreement with the Sultan of Brunei.

=== Commonwealth realms ===
Commonwealth realms, for example Australia, are former colonies that are now sovereign states fully independent of the UK parliament. However, they share other legal institutions with the UK, to varying degrees.

King Charles III remains the constitutional monarch of each realm in its own right, and retains a limited set of powers (royal prerogative) to be exercised either personally or through a local viceroy. Most powers are irrevocably delegated to a parliament more or less modelled on the Westminster system.

Crimes in Commonwealth realms are prosecuted in the name of the crown, and the crown remains the notional arbiter of disputes. In some realms appeals may be directed to the monarch as a last resort. Adjudication of these appeals is delegated to Judicial Committee of the Privy Council, which draws judges from the UK and across the Commonwealth. In other realms, a domestic court has been made the highest court of appeal. See Judicial Committee of the Privy Council § Overseas jurisdiction for full list.

The "Imperial" Privy Council based in England advises the shared monarch on the use of royal prerogatives and parliament-authorized powers in the form of Orders in Council, and can also issue its own delegated Orders of Council. In some countries, a domestic council performs this function, namely:

- Federal Executive Council (Australia)
- King's Privy Council for Canada
- Executive Council of New Zealand

Similar to other former colonies, Commonwealth realms also share a common legal history with the UK. For example, Canada underwent a long period of patriation of its constitution, beginning with the Constitution Act, 1867 and ending with the Constitution Act, 1982. Like their southern neighbours, the Proclamation of 1763 extended English Common law to all the Canadian colonies, including Nova Scotia (which being Scottish might have operated under Scots law). French civil law was later re-applied to Quebec.

=== Crown Dependencies ===
The Channel Islands are held by the British Monarch by virtue of inheriting the feudal title of Duke of Normandy. These were never part of England, Wales, Scotland, Ireland, or the United Kingdom. Most of the historical Duchy of Normandy is on the European continent and was conquered by France. The Isle of Man is held by the British Monarch by virtue of inheriting the feudal title of Lord of Mann. It was previously ruled by Norway, England, and Scotland, before the feudal rights were purchased from Scottish dukes, after English-Scottish unification, by the United Kingdom in 1765. Due to local opposition, it was never merged into England as previously planned, and remains a distinct possession of the monarchy.

Each jurisdiction has a locally elected parliament with broad but not unlimited autonomy, which like the UK parliament requires royal assent to pass laws. The British monarchy retains responsibility for defence, citizenship law, and foreign affairs of the dependencies, and has delegated these responsibilities to the UK government and Parliament. The UK parliament generally acts in consultation or gains the consent of the local government when passing laws that have effect in the dependencies. The islands of Alderney and Sark in the Bailiwick of Guernsey have their own parliaments, and the parliament of Guernsey generally only extends Bailiwick-wide laws to them with their consent.

Residents of the dependencies do not have representation in the UK Parliament. UK law does not apply to the dependencies unless explicitly stated or clearly intended, and such laws are almost always executed by the monarch in the form of an Order in Council. This constitutional arrangement was tested when the Isle of Man, supply base for Radio Caroline, rejected the Marine, &c., Broadcasting (Offences) Act 1967, but the legislation was extended to the island anyway by an Order in Council. This resulted in some protests and talk of independence in the Manx legislature, but no consequential action. For centuries, UK laws have been considered to override local legislation, but since the 1980s, the Manx Staff of Government Division have asserted the two are co-equal.

Legal cases may be appealed to the Judicial Committee of the Privy Council. Residents are treated the same as residents of the UK for the purposes of British nationality law, though local governments control local immigration and employment. Prior to Brexit this made citizens of the British dependencies EU citizens, but the exchange of people and goods with the EU and UK was subject to special arrangements.

=== British Overseas Territories ===
Though not considered internal to the boundaries of United Kingdom, the UK maintains control over British Overseas Territories. Unlike Commonwealth realms, BOTs fall within the Monarchy of the United Kingdom. The Judicial Committee of the Privy Council is the court of final appeal. Three of the BOT are uninhabited, and Akrotiri and Dhekelia is military property; in these places, the UK government rules directly and on all matters.

The inhabited British Overseas Territories do not have representation in the UK parliament, and are thus on the United Nations list of non-self-governing territories. Gibraltar, prior to Brexit, was the only BOT which was a part of the European Union, and residents voted for a representative in the European Parliament in the South West England district. Prior to Brexit all citizens of British Overseas Territories were EU citizens, even though European Union law only applied in Gibraltar and the United Kingdom proper.

The inhabited territories each have their own legal system, based largely on English common law, with autonomy varying considerably with the size of the population. For example, Bermuda, Gibraltar, and the Falkland Islands are autonomously governed by their locally elected parliaments, with the UK responsible only for defence and foreign affairs and granting limited autonomy to local governments to have relations with other countries and international organizations. On the sparsely populated Pitcairn Islands, the representative of the UK government has nearly unlimited power.

Citizenship and nationality law is governed by the UK parliament. Immigration is controlled by local governments. The UK parliament retains the ultimate legislative power, and ensures good governance.

== See also ==
- Age-of-consent reform in the United Kingdom
- British nationality law
- British labour law
- Constitution of the United Kingdom
- Constitutional reform in the United Kingdom
- Copyright law of the United Kingdom
- Electoral reform in the United Kingdom
- Legal education in the United Kingdom
- List of legislation in the United Kingdom
- Software patents under United Kingdom patent law
- United Kingdom company law
- UK commercial law
- UK competition law
- United Kingdom trade mark law
