= Proposed Welsh justice system =

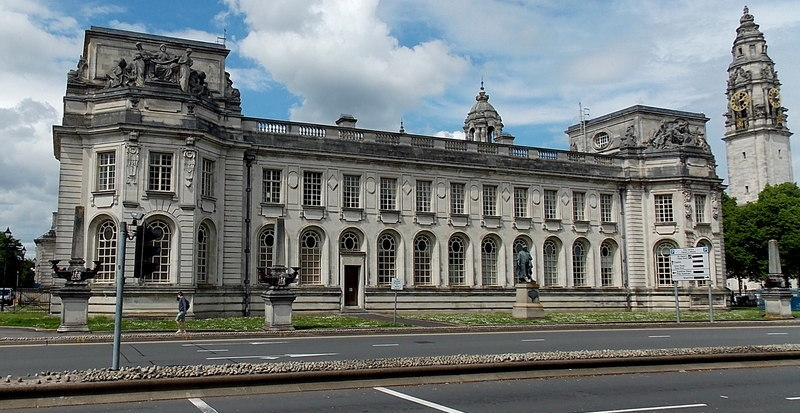
Cardiff Crown Court

The justice system in Wales is currently part of the England and Wales justice system. There have been proposals for a Wales-only justice system under the control of the Senedd to deal with Welsh issues, as an aspect of proposed further Welsh devolution.

== Background ==
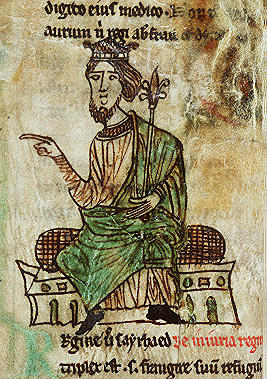
Hywel Dda, King of Wales

Cyfraith Hywel or "Laws of Hywel Dda" was a system of medieval Welsh Law that was exercised in Wales, after being codified by the King of Wales, Hywel Dda who died in the year 950. The law of Hywel lost its practical importance after the conquest of Wales by Edward I and the Statute of Rhuddlan in 1284. The law retained legal separation in Wales until the Laws in Wales Acts 1535 and 1542.

Since the Laws in Wales Acts, Wales has been part of the single legal jurisdiction of England and Wales. Currently, the following matters are reserved to the UK parliament, meaning they cannot be amended by an act of the Welsh Senedd:

(a) courts;
(b) judges;
(c) civil or criminal proceedings;
(d) pardons for crimes;
(e) private international law;
(f) judicial review of administrative action as well as policing.

Despite recommendations for devolution of these matters to the Senedd by reports and individuals, the UK government currently disagrees with the devolution of justice to Wales.

== State of justice in Wales ==
=== Wales-specific figures published ===
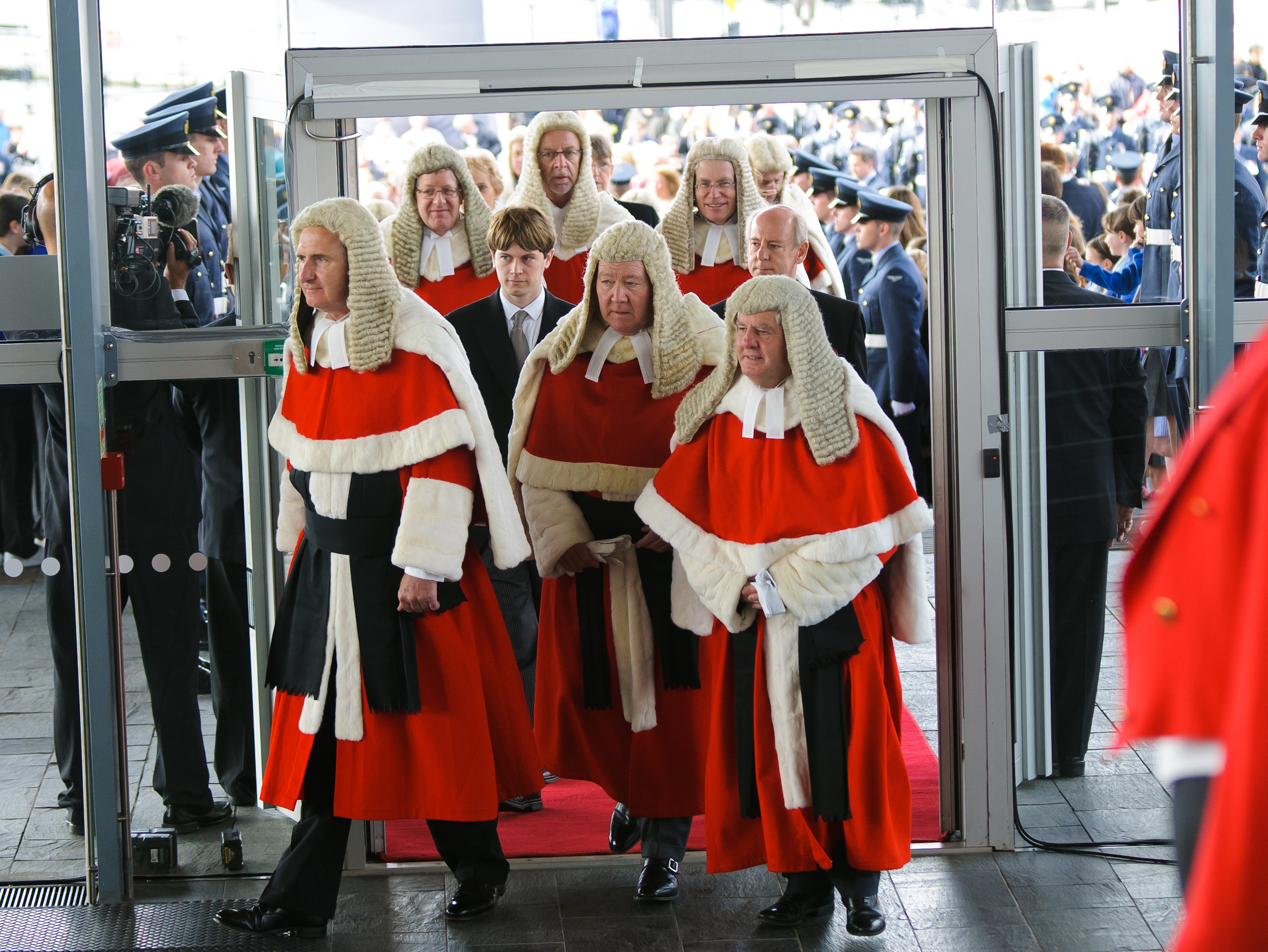
Welsh Judges at the opening of the Fourth Senedd Assembly in 2011

In 2019, research by the Wales Governance Centre showed Wales specific figures for the first time ever. Sentencing figures showed that there were 154 prisoners for every 100,000 people in Wales, the highest in Western Europe. England came in second with 141 per 100,000, Scotland third with 135 and Spain fourth with 134. There were more people being jailed in Wales despite a lower crime rate than in England every year from 2013 to 2017. Dr Robert Jones said, "Gradually, a detailed picture is emerging of the justice system in Wales and how it is quite different to that of England."

In response to the emergence of these figures, Plaid Cymru said that the penal system was failing and that the figures added weight to the argument that the justice system should be devolved to Wales. Plaid Cymru leader in Westminster, Liz Saville Roberts said "Wales being at the top of this league table is a source of great shame. Our national assembly for Wales should take control of our prison system so we can create one fit for the unique needs of our nation and not simply allow Westminster to impose its unsuitable policies."

Jane Hutt, Member of Senedd (MS) responsible for justice policy said, "Whilst justice remains a non-devolved function, work is underway to get the best possible solution for Wales. Working with the Youth Justice Board Cymru and HMPPS [the UK government prison and probation service], we are developing proposals on how a distinct and different justice system would operate specifically for female and youth offenders in Wales. Early intervention and prevention are key – considering how we can divert people away from crime in the first place in a holistic and rehabilitative way is essential to Wales' future outlook."

In October 2022, Dr Robert Jones upon the publication of his book The Welsh Criminal Justice System, said: "On many key measures we uncover that the Welsh criminal justice system performs even worse than that of England, a country with a well-deserved reputation as among the worst performers in western Europe. We see higher rates of violent offences, disturbing data on race throughout the system, higher rates of incarceration than in England, and a higher proportion of the population subject to some kind of probation supervision." He added, "Overall, we cannot avoid the conclusion that the way that the Welsh criminal justice system is organised is structurally and endemically dysfunctional."

=== Female prisoners ===
In February 2023, a new report showed that women prisoners from south Wales are forced to carry out their sentences in England and are living in poor conditions. Family and friends of female prisoners, therefore, have to travel to England for visitations. Jenny Rathbone, MS for Cardiff Central and Chair of the Senedd's Equality and Social Justice Committee said, "Ultimately we need to have the devolution of Justice to Wales – it's a work in progress."

== Proposals for Welsh system ==
The Silk Commission in 2014 recommended the following timetable of devolution;

- 2017: youth justice system
- 2017: police
- By 2018: finish review of devolution of prisons and probation
- Ongoing: administrative devolution of the court system
- By 2025: completion and implementation

In 2015, a UK government paper led to agreement on further administrative devolution in the court system and the creation of a Welsh Criminal Justice Board. The Wales Act 2017 implemented these agreements.

In 2018, Jeremy Miles, who was Council General for Wales and Member of Senedd, called for the devolution of justice to help prevent crime.

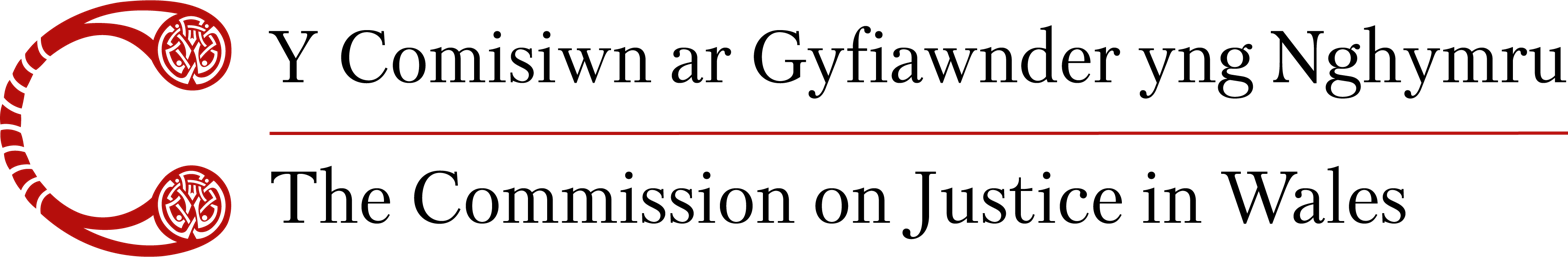
Commission on Justice in Wales Logo

The Commission on Justice in Wales produced a report in 2019 assessing the justice system in Wales for the first time in over 200 years. The report criticised the UK government's funding of justice in Wales, noting that the cuts to the justice budget by the UK government was "amongst the most severe of all departmental budget cuts". The report notes how the Welsh Government has used its own money to attempt to "mitigate the damaging effects of these policies". 40% of justice funding is contributed in Wales in addition to Welsh taxpayers' money paid to Westminster which is redistributed back to Wales. The report determined that "justice should be determined and delivered in Wales". In summary, the report made the following recommendations: Justice responsibilities should be held by a single Welsh MS and department, form a Welsh Criminal Justice Board, Criminal justice data should be Wales specific and more detailed and increased utilisation of prison alternatives, particularly for women.

The Law Council of Wales was established following recommendations by the independent Commission of Justice in Wales in 2019 which set out the vision of the legal system in Wales. The commission was chaired by Lord Thomas of Cwmgiedd, former Lord Chief Justice of England and Wales. The Law Council of Wales was established for the purpose of promoting legal education, training and awareness in Welsh law. The council also supports economic development and sustainability of law in Wales. The inaugural meeting was planned for November 2021.

In May 2022 the Welsh Government produced a document titled "Delivering justice for Wales", written by Mick Antoniw and Jane Hutt. The publication says that devolution of justice to Wales is 'inevitable', and proposes the following "core components":

- A focus on prevention and rehabilitation.
- Reducing the prison population by pursuing alternatives to custody where appropriate. These include programmes to tackle mental health issues and support and treatment for drug and alcohol misuse.
- Using a rights based approach to law and policy making, and further incorporation of internationally agreed rights into domestic law.

In November 2022, Plaid Cymru Westminster Leader, Liz Saville Roberts also called for the devolution of justice to Wales in a parliament debate in Westminster. She stated ahead of the debate, "Scotland, Northern Ireland, London, Manchester. All enjoy either full control, or a degree of devolved control of the delivery of justice. ... Wales, on the hand, continues to be treated as an appendage to England despite overwhelming evidence of the harm that causes." In response to the Westminster debate led by Liz Saville Roberts, the UK government said "The UK Government disagrees with the devolution of justice to Wales".

In December 2022, first minister Mark Drakeford reiterated his desire for devolution of justice and said about Gordon Brown's Labour manifesto proposals of devolution of probation and youth justice, "in a practical way, we should focus on those aspects first, and if we can secure their devolution to Wales, then we will be able to move on from there into the other aspects that would follow."

In the same month, Welsh academics, Professor Richard Wyn Jones and Dr Robert Jones advocated for the devolution of justice to Wales and published a book The Welsh Criminal Justice System: On the Jagged Edge. Wyn Jones added, “The Welsh criminal justice system remains stranded in a kind of constitutional limbo or no-man's-land: neither quite Westminster's nor Cardiff Bay's. As a result, this is a policy area in which the writs of both levels of government are constrained not only by problems inherent to criminal justice, but as a direct consequence of a unique and overly complex set of constitutional arrangements. ... Devolving justice does not of itself guarantee a better functioning Welsh criminal justice system, but the current system is failing Wales, its people and its communities, very badly. And there is no prospect of those failings being addressed in any serious and systematic way until justice is devolved."

== Police ==
Wales police forces: 1. Dyfed–Powys Police; 2. Gwent Police; 3. North Wales Police; 4. South Wales Police

In May 2022, the four Police and Crime Commissioners produced a statement supporting the devolution of justice to Wales. They also cited the rollout of Wales-specific policing during the COVID pandemic, and the comments of the former Lord Chancellor, who said "you do seem to be better at doing things together in Wales". Plaid Cymru support devolving powers over Welsh police forces to Wales, suggesting that the Welsh police forces would receive an additional £25 million a year, equating to an additional 900 police officers. The Thomas commission and national media in Wales have also called for policing to be devolved. Policing is already devolved in Scotland and Northern Ireland.

Former first minister of Wales and current south Wales Police commissioner Alun Michael also supports devolution of policing and criminal justice system to Wales.

== See also ==
- Courts of England and Wales
