= Taxation in Wales =

Taxation in Wales (Welsh: Trethi yng Nghymru) typically comprises payments to one or more of the three different levels of government: the UK government (Her Majesty's Revenue and Customs), the Welsh Government, and local government.

In the fiscal year 2017–18, total Welsh government revenue was forecast to be £27.1 billion, or 38.3 per cent of GDP, with net VAT, income tax, and National Insurance contributions standing at £15.8 billion.

The Welsh Government acquired the power to vary income tax on the 10% share it collects in 2019, however it has not opted to do so.

== History ==
Taxation in Wales was not documented in the Cyfraith Hywel nor in the time after it. The Norman conquest of England brought some areas of Wales under the control of William the Conqueror, but the Domesday Book shows little success in establishing a framework for taxation for Wales. Although areas of Powys began to see land ownership recorded for future taxation, little of that county, let alone the rest of Wales, was ever recorded.

The conquest by Edward I of the remainder of Wales by 1283 brought the introduction of English common law over the whole of the country. Welsh law continued in force until the formal annexation of Wales through the Laws in Wales Acts 1535–1542.

Welsh taxation developed from that point in line with the development of taxation in England. As England (and later the United Kingdom) was a unitary state, taxation of Welsh matters the responsibility of the Parliament of the United Kingdom and its Government. The National Assembly for Wales, established Following the Government of Wales Act 1998, gained the power to legislate on matters devolved to it, subject to approval of the UK Parliament in Westminster; the need for this approval was removed, and thus full lawmaking competence established, following a referendum on 3 March 2011. The Wales Act 2014 devolved control of certain taxes, as well as the power to create new taxes, with UK Parliament approval; and the Wales Act 2017 moved Wales to the same reserved matters model as applies to Scotland, devolved limited authority over Welsh income taxes, and created the Welsh Revenue Authority. On 1 April 2018, the land transaction tax, replacing stamp duty in Wales, became the first uniquely Welsh tax in almost 800 years.

The Assembly was renamed Senedd Cymru (English: Welsh Parliament) in May 2020.

== Devolution of tax ==
The administration of devolved taxes in Wales is managed by the Welsh Revenue Authority.

=== Local taxation ===
Legislative powers over local taxation, including council tax and non-domestic (business) rates, have been devolved to Wales since 1999.

=== Land transaction tax and landfill disposals tax ===
Since April 2018, both the land transaction tax (which replaced stamp duty for Wales) and landfill disposals tax have been the responsibility of the Welsh Government.

=== Income tax ===
Partial responsibilities for income tax in Wales were given to the Welsh Government beginning with the tax year April 2019, following devolution of the matter in the Wales Act 2014. Under the measure, 10 pence of every pound in each tax bracket will go to the Welsh Government.

- For the basic 20% rate of tax, 10% will go to the Welsh Government and 10% will go to the UK Government.
- For the higher rate (£31,786–150,000) the 40% tax is split at 10% to the Welsh Government and 30% to the UK Government.
- On the additional rate of tax (over £150,000), the 45% rate is split 10% to the Welsh Government and 35% to the UK Government.

The Wales Act 2014 also permits the creation of new taxes by the Senedd. The Bevan Foundation made a number of proposals for potential future taxes in Wales in its 'Tax for Good' project.

== Administration ==
=== Local government ===
Welsh Local Government revenue comes primarily from Welsh Government grants, Non-Domestic (Business) Rates, Council Tax, and increasingly from fees and charges such as those for on-street parking.

=== Welsh Government ===
Since devolution, the Welsh Assembly has been permitted to legislate on local taxation such as council tax and business rates, as well as set grant levels.

The Wales Act 2014 gave the Welsh Government responsibility to administer stamp duty and landfill tax for the first time. These were first handed over to Cardiff Bay in April 2018.

The Wales Act 2017 began the process of partially devolving power over income tax to the Welsh Government, and these changes took effect in April 2019. All other revenues remain controlled by the UK Government, however, including income tax, VAT, alcohol duty, aviation taxes, and hydrocarbon oil duty (fuel tax).

== Revenues ==
The most recent and comprehensive assessment of taxation in Wales is a report by the Cardiff University's Wales Fiscal Analysis centre. Titled Government Expenditure and Revenue Wales 2019, it found public sector revenue in Wales was £27.1 billion for the years 2017–18. This represents only 3.6% the UK's whole revenues of £751.8 billion.

Per capita Government revenue in Wales is £8,650, compared with £11,350 in the UK as a whole.

Revenues as a percentage of GDP was estimated at 38.3%, in contrast with a figure of 36.4% for the rest of the UK. The authors of the report attributed this to Wales having a lower estimated GDP than the whole UK.

Wales has had lower total per capita revenues than other parts of the UK every year studied since 1999–2000.

The largest sources of Government revenue in Wales, in order, are VAT (£6.4 bn), Income Tax (£4.9 bn) and National Insurance contributions (£4.5 bn).

As a percentage of GDP, VAT and excise duty collect a greater share of revenue in Wales than the rest of the UK, while Income Tax and Corporation Tax shares are lower.

== See also ==
=== UK-related ===
- HM Revenue & Customs
- Chartered Institute of Taxation
- Government spending in the United Kingdom
- Institute of Indirect Taxation
- Income in the United Kingdom
- Tax credit
- Starting rate of UK income tax

=== Local taxation ===
- Business rates in Wales
- Council tax in Wales
- Local income tax

=== General category ===
- Tax
- Tax haven
- Tax law
