= Welsh law =

Primary and secondary legislation generated by the Senedd

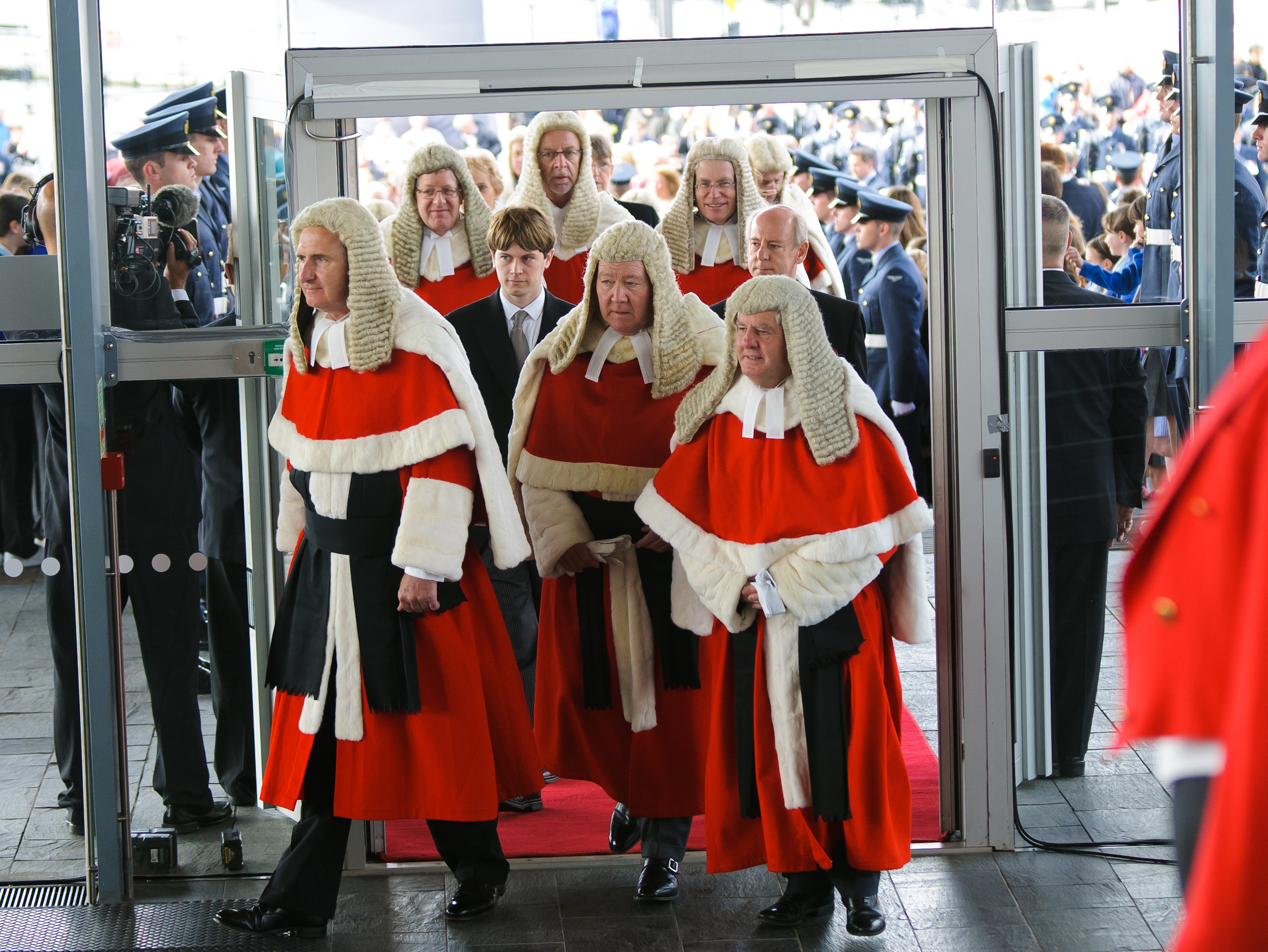
Welsh Judges at the Fourth Senedd Assembly; June 2011

Welsh law (Welsh: Cyfraith Cymru) is a semi-autonomous part of the English law system (Note: The legal system in Wales is known as English law rather than English and Welsh law. See Welsh law#Terminology.) composed of legislation made by the Senedd. Wales is part of the legal jurisdiction of England and Wales, one of the three legal jurisdictions of the United Kingdom. However, due to devolution, the law in Wales is increasingly distinct from the law in England, since the Senedd, the devolved parliament of Wales, can legislate on non-reserved matters. Welsh law has been generated by the Senedd since the Government of Wales Act 2006 and in effect since May 2007. Each piece of Welsh legislation is known as an Act of Senedd Cymru. The first Welsh legislation to be proposed was the NHS Redress (Wales) Measure 2008. This was the first time in almost 500 years that Wales has had its own laws, since Cyfraith Hywel, a version of Celtic law, was abolished and replaced by English law through the Laws in Wales Acts, enacted between 1535 and 1542 during the reign of King Henry VIII.

Because Wales is not a distinct legal jurisdiction, matters of justice are reserved to Westminster. There have, however, been calls for a distinct legal jurisdiction, the devolution of justice and policing to the Senedd and a Wales criminal justice system. For example, in 2020, an independent commission led by Lord Thomas of Cwmgiedd, the former Lord Chief Justice of England and Wales, came to the conclusion that the existing arrangement was ‘failing the people of Wales’.

== Terminology ==
The law of Wales is referred to as part of the system of English law because Wales is part of the legal jurisdiction of England and Wales. The term 'English law' is preferred by the Law Society rather than 'English and Welsh law'.

== History of law devolution ==
=== Government of Wales Act 1998 ===
The Government of Wales Act 1998 (GoWA 1998) set up the then National Assembly for Wales (Cynulliad Cenedlaethol Cymru) as a corporate body, which was later renamed the Welsh Parliament (Senedd Cymru). Executive functions (known as powers) were transferred via Welsh devolution from the UK Government to the National Assembly for Wales. These included powers for agriculture, culture, economic development, education, health, housing, local government, social services and planning in Wales.

Transfer of Functions Orders were also made under GoWA 1998, transferring to the National Assembly for Wales executive functions in the same areas. These function included making regulations, rules, orders and giving financial assistance in those areas. Function orders came into effect via the National Assembly for Wales (Transfer of Functions) Order 1999.

=== Government of Wales Act 2006 ===
The Government of Wales Act 2006 made the National Assembly for Wales a fully-fledged legislature and the Welsh Assembly Government (since renamed Welsh Government) as the devolved executive for Wales. The executive functions of the Welsh assembly was transferred to Welsh ministers who made up the Welsh Assembly Government. The Act allowed the National Assembly for Wales to pass Assembly Measures on some matters. The Act also granted further powers in matters such as economic, social and environmental well-being of Wales and culture which included the Welsh language. The Assembly was also empowered to pass Acts, although this required a referendum to be held and receive a "Yes" vote from the Welsh people.

=== Welsh devolution referendum 2011 ===
In March 2011, a referendum was held on whether full primary law-making powers should be given to the National Assembly in the twenty subject areas where it held jurisdiction. The referendum concluded with 63.5% of voters supporting the transfer of full primary law-making powers to the Assembly.

=== Further powers and status ===
The UK Government also formed the Commission on Devolution in Wales (the Silk Commission). The commission published part 1 of its report in 2012, recommending new financial powers for Wales including borrowing and taxation, which came into force in the Wales Act 2014.

The Tax Collection and Management (Wales) Act 2016 was passed by the National Assembly to facilitate the financial powers of the Wales Act 2014. The Land Transaction Tax (replacing Stamp Duty) and the Landfill Disposal Tax were the first two devolved taxes. In 2019, over £2 billion of income tax was devolved to the Senedd.

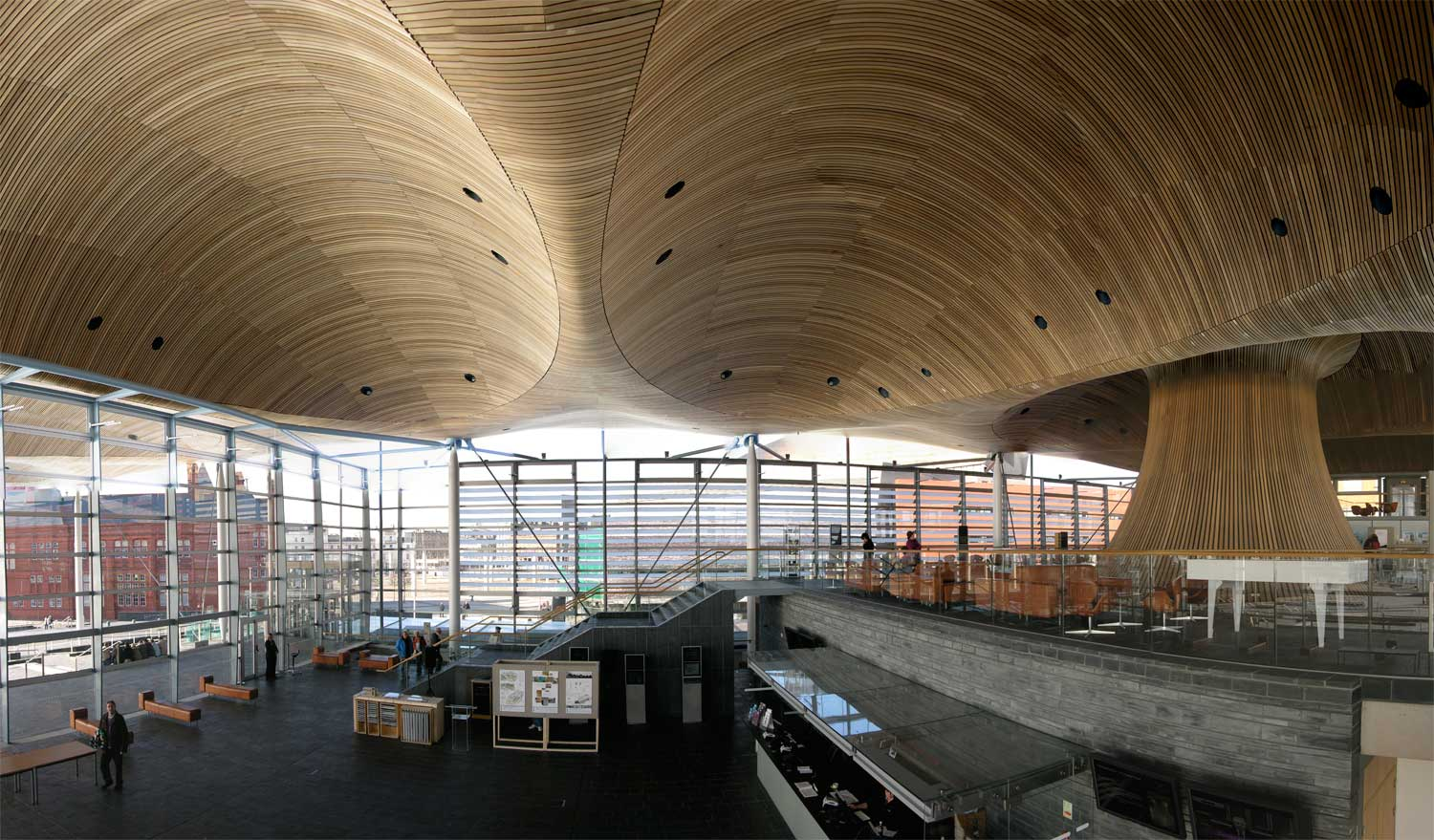
Hall and oriel of the Senedd building

The Wales Act 2017 defined the National Assembly and devolved institutions to be a permanent component of the UK constitution, and any abolition of such institutions would require a referendum. The act also changed the model of operation of the devolved institutions from a "conferred powers model" to a "reserved powers model". The Assembly was also given the power to decide its own name and voting system of members.

In May 2020, the Senedd and Elections (Wales) Act 2020, the National Assembly for Wales was renamed "Senedd Cymru" or "the Welsh Parliament", commonly known as the "Senedd" in both English and Welsh, to reflect increased legislative powers. The Act, for the first time in Wales, allowed 16 and 17-year-olds the right to vote, beginning with the 2021 Senedd election.

=== Law Council of Wales 2019 ===
The Law Council of Wales was established following recommendations by the independent Commission of Justice in Wales in 2019 which set out the vision of the legal system in Wales. The commission was chaired by Lord Thomas of Cwmgiedd, former Lord Chief Justice of England and Wales. The council also supports economic development and sustainability of law in Wales.

The inaugural meeting was planned for November 2021.

== Welsh Law ==
=== Devolved legislation ===
The Royal Badge of Wales

The Senedd is able to pass laws in any area which is not explicitly reserved by Westminster, subject to a number of general restrictions (such as compatibility with the Human Rights Act).

Reserved subject areas include:

- The Currency
- Nationality
- Defence of the Realm
- Justice
- Energy production above 350MW
- Most benefits
- Most taxes

=== Wales-only laws ===
There are Acts of the UK Parliament that are classed as "Wales-only laws". Each Act contains provisions using which the Senedd can make secondary legislation. Sometimes such Acts can also confer power to the Senedd. An example of such a Wales-only law is the Transport (Wales) Act 2006.

The Welsh Language (Wales) Measure 2011 modernised the 1993 Welsh Language Act and gave Welsh an official status in Wales for the first time, a major landmark for the language. Welsh is the only official de jure language of any country in the UK. The Measure was also responsible for creating the post of Welsh Language Commissioner, replacing the Welsh Language Board. Following the referendum in 2011, the Official Languages Act became the first Welsh law to be created in 600 years, according to the First Minister at the time, Carwyn Jones. This law was passed by Welsh AMs only and made Welsh an official language of the National Assembly.

=== Wales as a legal jurisdiction ===
Laws that are made in Wales, that apply to Wales, are currently a part of the law of England and Wales because England and Wales form one legal jurisdiction. Scotland and Northern Ireland have their own, separate legal jurisdictions.

The One Wales agreement between Labour and Plaid Cymru (2007–2011) called for a review of criminal justice matters in Wales, and the question of whether they should be devolved to Wales, proposing a Criminal and Youth Justice System within Welsh law. Currently, however, there has been no such devolution of justice to the Senedd.

A commission set up in 2017 by the First Minister of Wales, known as "The Commission on Justice in Wales" and chaired by Lord Thomas of Cwmgiedd, looked into the operation of justice in the country. It aimed to further clarify the legal and political identity of Wales within the UK constitution. The commission's report was released in October 2019 and recommended the devolution of the justice system.

== English law in Wales ==
An introduction to Cyfraith Cymru – Welsh Law; a short video by the Welsh Government; 2015.

English law still applies in Wales, but some laws in England, about matters that are devolved in Wales, may not apply in Wales. Once the Senedd has legislative competency in an area through an Act of Senedd Cymru, the Senedd can legislate differently from English law. Some actions can be unlawful in Wales, but not in England or Scotland. For example, using an electric shock collar on a cat or dog is unlawful in Wales, but not in the rest of the UK.

== See also ==
- Proposed Welsh justice system
- Royal Commission on the Constitution (United Kingdom)
- Senedd
- Welsh Government
- President of Welsh Tribunals
- English Law
- Northern Ireland law
- Scots Law
- St David's Day Agreement
- Welsh Devolution
- Cyfraith Hywel, ancient Welsh law
