= Commission on Justice in Wales =

Welsh Government commission (2017–2019)

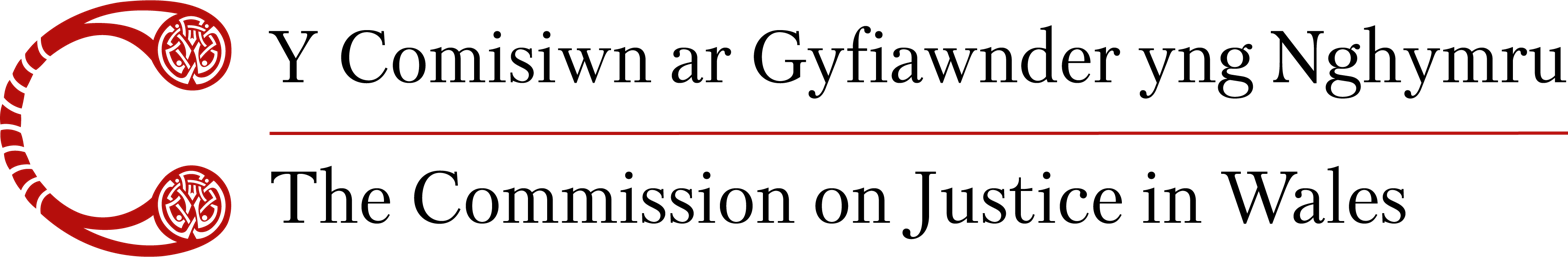
Commission on Justice in Wales logo

The Commission on Justice in Wales (Welsh: Y Comisiwn ar Cyfiawnder yng Nghymru), also known as the Thomas Commission (after the commission's head John Thomas, Baron Thomas of Cwmgiedd), was a commission set up by the Welsh government to review the justice system in Wales between December 2017 and October 2019. The commission recommended the responsibilities of the justice system in Wales be devolved, data become Wales-specific and the establishment of a Welsh Criminal Justice Board.

== Proposals ==
The Commission on Justice in Wales produced a report in 2019 assessing the justice system in Wales for the first time in over 200 years. The report criticised the UK government's funding of justice in Wales, noting that the cuts to the justice budget by the UK government was "amongst the most severe of all departmental budget cuts". The report notes how the Welsh Government has used its own money to attempt to "mitigate the damaging effects of these policies". 40% of justice funding is contributed in Wales in addition to Welsh taxpayers money paid to Westminster which is redistributed back to Wales.The report determined that "justice should be determined and delivered in Wales". In summary, the report made the following recommendations: Justice responsibilities should be held by a single Welsh MS and department, form a Welsh Criminal Justice Board, criminal justice data should be Wales specific and more detailed and increased utilisation of prison alternatives, particularly for women.

The Law Council of Wales was established following recommendations by the independent Commission of Justice in Wales in 2019 which set out the vision of the legal system in Wales. The commission was chaired by Baron Thomas of Cwmgiedd, former Lord Chief Justice of England and Wales. The Law Council of Wales was established for the purpose of promoting legal education, training and awareness in Welsh law. The council also supports economic development and sustainability of law in Wales. The inaugural meeting was planned for November 2021.

"The National" newspaper had also called for policing and justice to be devolved in 2022.
