= Welsh Revenue Authority =

Welsh Government department

Welsh Revenue Authority Awdurdod Cyllid Cymru

Non-ministerial government department overview
- Formed: 1 October 2017
- Jurisdiction: Wales
- Employees: 100+ (2025)
- Minister responsible: Mark Drakeford, Cabinet Secretary for Finance and Welsh Language
- Non-ministerial government department executives: Rebecca Godfrey, Chief executive; Ruth Glazzard, Chair
- Key document: Wales Act 2014 & Wales Act 2017
- Website: gov.wales/welsh-revenue-authority

The Welsh Revenue Authority (Welsh: Awdurdod Cyllid Cymru) is a non-ministerial department of the Welsh Government responsible for the administration and collection of devolved taxes in Wales.

The Welsh Revenue Authority is accountable to the Senedd.

== History ==
For over 800 years most taxes in Wales had been collected by the UK government. The Welsh Revenue Authority was formed in 2017 as the first non-ministerial government department of the Welsh Government, in anticipation of it becoming responsible for collecting taxes devolved to the Senedd under the terms of the Wales Act 2014 and 2017. The 2017 Act also gave the Senedd powers to vary the basic rate of income tax by 10p, but this will be administered by HMRC.

The Tax Collection and Management (Wales) Act 2016 (anaw 6), which establishes the legal basis for the operation of the Welsh Revenue Authority, was passed by the Welsh Parliament in April 2016.

The Welsh Revenue Authority was officially established to collect Wales' newly devolved taxes – the first Welsh-wide tax collection system for over 800 years.

== Devolved taxes ==
Mark Drakeford, Cabinet Secretary for Finance discussing the forthcoming Welsh Taxes in 2017

An explanation of the tax system in Wales.

The Wales Act 2014 and Wales Act 2017 devolved the following taxes to the Welsh Parliament:

- Non Domestic Rates in Wales – from 1 April 2015
- Land Transaction Tax (LTT) – from 1 April 2018
- Landfill Disposals Tax (LDT) – from 1 April 2018
- Welsh Rates of Income Tax (WRIT) – from 1 April 2019

The relevant legislation governing the Welsh Revenue Authority and Welsh taxes are:

- Tax Collection and Management (Wales) Act 2016
- Land Transaction Tax and Anti-avoidance of Devolved Taxes (Wales) Act 2017
- Landfill Disposals Tax (Wales) Act 2017

As of 2023, they are also exploring the implementation of a Local Authority Opt-In Visitor Levy.

== Governance structure ==
The minister responsible for the Welsh Revenue Authority is the Minister for Finance, Rebecca Evans MS. Dyfed Alsop was appointed as CEO to lead the organisation

The board of the Welsh Revenue Authority is composed of six members. Its main role is to develop and approve the Welsh Revenue Authority's overall strategy, approve final business plans and advise the chief executive on key appointments. It also performs an assurance role and advises on best practice.

=== Board ===
Ruth Glazzard was appointed as chair. The board members currently are:

- Ruth Glazzard, chair
- Jocelyn Davies, deputy chair
- Rebecca Godfrey, chief executive
- Mary Champion, non-executive member
- Rheon Tomos, non-executive member
- Jim Scopes, non-executive member
- Dave Matthews, strategy and capability director
- Indee Dehal, staff elected member

== Selection of head office ==
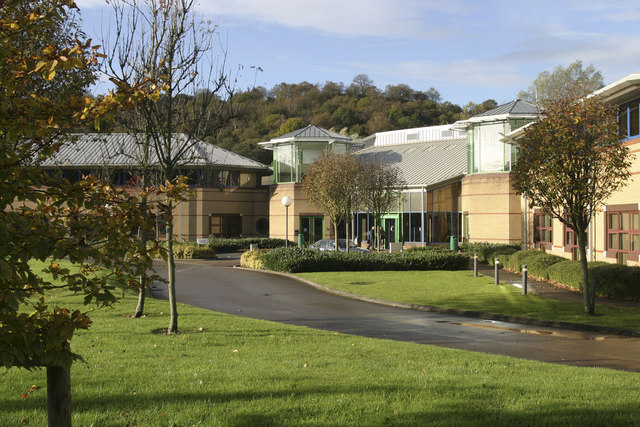
QED Centre, past headquarters of the Welsh Revenue Authority in Pontypridd

There was a three phase process in the selection the head office of the authority. Phase 1 and 2 drew up a short-list of viable locations from within the Welsh Government estate. This considered six properties located in Sarn Mynach in Llandudno Junction, Rhodfa Padarn in Aberystwyth, Rhydycar Business Park in Merthyr Tydfil, the QED Centre in Treforest (near Pontypridd), Cathays Park in Cardiff and Picton Terrace in Carmarthen.

Phase three of the process appraised the short-listed locations based on three agreed critical of the ability to attract and retain a skilled workforce, the proximity to stakeholders and the proximity to customers. From this process three Welsh Government offices were available which could have potentially met the criteria, Cathays Park, Rhydycar Business Park and the QED Centre. The Rhydycar Business Park site was assessed as being higher risk in its ability to attract key skills and being its location in relation to its customer base. The QED Centre near Pontypridd was ultimately chosen as the site of the authority.

After a flood at the QED Centre in early 2020, alongside the COVID-19 pandemic, they have moved to a 2 office model of working. With the offices being in Rhydycar Business Park (Merthyr Tyfdil) and Cathays Park 2 (Cardiff).

== See also ==
- HM Revenue and Customs
- Revenue Scotland
