= Law Council of Wales =

Welsh organisation

The Law Council of Wales (Welsh: Cyngor Cyfraith Cymru) is an organisation in Wales which promotes legal education, awareness of Welsh law, provision of teaching the law in Welsh and to assist students in law training.

== History ==
The Law Council of Wales was established for the purpose of promoting legal education, training and awareness in Welsh law. The council also supports economic development and sustainability of law in Wales.

=== Thomas Commission ===
The Law Council of Wales was established following recommendations by the independent Commission of Justice in Wales in 2019 which set out the vision of the legal system in Wales. The commission was chaired by Lord Thomas of Cwmgiedd, former Lord Chief Justice of England and Wales.

== Committee members ==
- Lord Lloyd-Jones, Justice of the Supreme Court of the United Kingdom (President of the Law Council of Wales)
- Professor Emyr Lewis, Aberystwyth University
- Alison Perry, Swansea University
- Dr Hephzibah Egede, Cardiff Metropolitan University
- Mark Davies, Goldstones Solicitors & Chair of The Law Society Wales Committee
- Dr Nerys Llewelyn-Jones, Agri Advisor
- David Elias, QC, 9 Park Place Chambers
- Jonathan Elystan Rees, QC, Apex Chambers
- In-house representative with one place shared on alternating basis: Dan Caunt, Admiral Group PLC, and Daniela Mahapatra, NWSSP Legal & Risk Services
- Sir Wyn Williams, President of Welsh Tribunals
- Presiding Judge for Wales representative shared alternatively between Mr Justice Simon Picken and Mrs Justice Nerys Jefford
- Jenny Hopkins, Crown Prosecution Service (CPS)
- Lord Justice Green, Law Commission
- Mr Justice Martin Griffiths, Judicial College
- Fran Targett, National Advice Network for Wales
