= Personal allowance =

Threshold for individual income tax in the UK

In the UK tax system, personal allowance, typically £12,570 in tax year 2025-26, is the threshold above which income tax is levied on an individual's taxable income. Taxable income is money earned from employment, profits from self-employment, some state benefits, most pensions including state pensions, rental income, benefits from a job, income from a trust, and interest on savings. A person who has taxable income below their personal allowance in a given tax year does not pay income tax; otherwise, tax must be paid on income above personal allowance.

There is an additional blind person's allowance of £3,130. The marriage allowance allows a person earning less than £12,570 to transfer £1,260 of personal allowance to a husband, wife or civil partner. Historical additional allowances for married couples and age related allowances for over-65s and over-75s and an allowance on mortgage interest have been phased out.

From April 2010 personal allowance is tapered for people earning over £100,000 a year: for every £2 earned above £100,000 the personal allowance is reduced by £1 until incomes above £125,140 have zero personal allowance. The additional £2 of income and the £1 removed from the tax free allowance are taxed at 40%, resulting in £1.20 ((2 + 1) * 40%) tax being paid for every additional £2 of income, a marginal tax rate of 60% (1.20 / 2 * 100) on incomes between £100,000 and £125,140.

There are additional tax allowances on income from savings interest and on rental income for resident landlords. Earnings from capital gains, and dividends have different tax thresholds and are taxed at different rates to income tax. Individuals also pay National Insurance Contributions an additional tax on income (paid at different rates by employees and employers).

== Impact of tapering on marginal rates ==
The taper creates an unusual situation where income between £100,000 and £125,140 is taxed at a higher effective rate than income above £125,140. For employees, adding National Insurance contributions of 2% results in a combined marginal rate of 62% in this band.

The number of taxpayers affected has grown significantly due to fiscal drag. The £100,000 threshold has remained unchanged since its introduction in April 2010, while earnings have risen with inflation. According to HMRC estimates obtained via Freedom of Information request:

- 1.22 million taxpayers were affected in 2021–22
- 1.95 million taxpayers are projected to be affected in 2025–26
- 2.29 million taxpayers are projected to be affected by 2028–29

The freeze on income tax thresholds, announced in 2021 and extended in the 2025 Budget until April 2031, has accelerated this trend.

=== Interaction with childcare entitlements ===
For families with young children, the £100,000 threshold has additional significance beyond income tax. Adjusted net income above £100,000 disqualifies parents from:

- 30 hours free childcare (worth approximately £6,000 per child per year)
- Tax-Free Childcare (up to £2,000 per child per year)

For example, a parent earning £100,000 with two pre-school-age children retains their full personal allowance and qualifies for both 30 hours of free childcare (worth approximately £12,000 per year for two children) and Tax-Free Childcare (worth up to £4,000 per year for two children). If their income rises by just £500 to £100,500, they lose £250 of their personal allowance and become ineligible for both childcare schemes. The £500 gross pay increase, therefore, results in a net loss of at least £15,000 per year.

=== Mitigation strategies ===
Taxpayers can reduce their adjusted net income below £100,000 to preserve some or all of their personal allowance. Common methods include:

- Making pension contributions, which reduce adjusted net income pound-for-pound
- Salary sacrifice arrangements for pension contributions, which additionally save National Insurance
- Gift Aid donations to charity, which extend the basic rate band

=== Scotland ===
Scottish taxpayers face a higher effective rate in this band due to Scotland's advanced rate of 45% (rather than 40%) applying between £75,001 and £125,140. Combined with the personal allowance taper, this creates an effective marginal rate of 67.5% before National Insurance.

== History ==
The trajectory of the value of the personal allowance in recent years, both in real terms and relative to earnings, is recorded by the Institute for Fiscal Studies. The allowance was raised significantly between April 2007 and April 2019, but has increased only slightly since, falling in real terms due to inflation, while (projected to 2027) remaining above the 2010 level.

On 22 June 2010, the new Chancellor George Osborne, as part of the coalition deal which sought to increase the Personal Allowance to £10,000 from April 2015 per Lib Dem policy, made the first increase of £1,000, making it £7,475 for the 2011-12 tax year. During the 2011 Budget, the allowance was raised by £630 to £8,105 from April 2012. In 2013, George Osborne revised the plans to increase the Personal Allowance and bring forward the date at which it would reach the £10,000 target. This resulted in the allowance being raised to £9,440 from April 2013, before being increased to £10,000 from April 2014, a year earlier than originally planned. In a series of increases personal allowance rose to £12,500 by April 2019. In the March 2021 budget Chancellor Rishi Sunak increased personal allowance to £12,570 for April 2021 but announced a freeze in all income tax thresholds thereafter until April 2026. In November 2022 Jeremy Hunt extended the freeze in income tax thresholds to April 2028. In October 2024 the new Chancellor Rachel Reeves intended to continue with the freeze in personal tax thresholds until April 2028.

== Married Man's allowance ==
Married Man's allowance was the allowance for a legally married couple. The allowance was given at the man's highest rate of tax. During the early-1990s, then-Chancellor of the Exchequer, Norman Lamont overhauled the allowance and introduced the 10% allowance, which meant that all men had the same amount of money in their pocket, irrespective of highest tax rate. The allowance was scrapped from April 2000, first being announced in then-Chancellor Gordon Brown's 1999 budget, with the exception of people married, or in civil partnerships (introduced in 2005) where one spouse was born before 6 April 1935.

== History of allowances ==
Year	Allowance (£)		
Year	Age under 65	Age 65 & over	
1976-77	735	1,010	
1977-78	945	1,250	
1978-79	985	1,300	
1979-80	1,165	1,540	
1980-81	1,375	1,820	
1981-82	1,375	1,820	
1982-83	1,565	2,070	
1983-84	1,785	2,360	
1984-85	2,005	2,490	
1985-86	2,205	2,690	
1986-87	2,335	2,850	
	Age under 65	Age 65-79	Age 80 & over
1987-88	2,425	2,960	3,070
1988-89	2,605	3,180	3,310
1989-90	2,785	3,400	3,540
1990–91	3,005	3,670	3,820
1991–92	3,295	4,020	4,180
1992–93	3,445	4,200	4,370
1993–94	3,445	4,200	4,370
1994–95	3,445	4,200	4,370
1995–96	3,525	4,200	4,370
1996–97	3,765	4,910	5,090
1997–98	4,045	5,220	5,400
1998–99	4,195	5,410	5,600
1999–00	4,335	5,720	5,980
2000–01	4,385	5,790	6,050
2001–02	4,535	5,990	6,260
2002–03	4,615	6,100	6,370
2003–04	4,615	6,610	6,720
2004–05	4,745	6,830	6,950
2005–06	4,895	7,090	7,220
2006–07	5,035	7,280	7,420
2007–08	5,225	7,550	7,690
2008–09	6,035	9,030	9,180
2009–10	6,475	9,490	9,640
2010–11	6,475	9,490	9,640
2011–12	7,475	9,940	10,090
2012–13	8,105	10,500	10,600
2013–14	9,440	10,500	10,660
2014–15	10,000	10,500	10,660
2015–16	10,600	-	
2016–17	11,000	-	
2017–18	11,500	-	
2018–19	11,850	-	
2019–20	12,500	-	
2020–21	12,500	-	
2021–22	12,570	-	
2022–23	12,570	-	
2023–24	12,570	-	
2024–25	12,570	-	
2025–26	12,570	-	

== See also ==
- Income tax in Scotland
- Welsh Rates of Income Tax
