= Commission on Devolution in Wales =

2011 British government body

The Commission on Devolution in Wales (Welsh: Comisiwn ar Ddatganoli yng Nghymru), also known as the Silk Commission, was an independent commission established by Welsh Secretary Cheryl Gillan on 11 October 2011. The commission was based at the Wales Office Cardiff headquarters, at Cardiff Bay and met for the first time on 4 November 2011 at the Millennium Stadium, Cardiff. The commission reviewed the case for the devolution of fiscal powers to the Welsh Assembly, now the Senedd, and considered the case for increasing the powers of the assembly. It published its findings in two parts.

== Membership ==
The commission had 7 members including representatives from the political parties represented in the Welsh Assembly:

- Paul Silk (chair)
- Dyfrig John (chairman of the Principality Building Society)
- Noel Lloyd (former vice-chancellor of Aberystwyth University)
- Nick Bourne (Welsh Conservatives)
- Sue Essex (Welsh Labour)
- Rob Humphreys (Welsh Liberal Democrats)
- Eurfyl ap Gwilym (Plaid Cymru)

== Terms of reference ==
The terms of reference for the commission were:

- To review the case for the devolution of fiscal powers to the National Assembly for Wales and to recommend a package of powers that would improve the financial accountability of the Assembly, which are consistent with the United Kingdom’s fiscal objectives and are likely to have a wide degree of support.
- To review the powers of the National Assembly for Wales in the light of experience and to recommend modifications to the present constitutional arrangements that would enable the United Kingdom Parliament and the National Assembly for Wales to better serve the people of Wales.

== Part I ==
In November 2012 the commission reported on the fiscal powers question. It made 33 recommendations designed to give the Welsh government responsibility for raising around one quarter of its budget. The commission's first report was implemented by the Wales Act 2014. Devolution of tax-raising powers is to begin with smaller taxes such as Stamp Duty in 2018, and by 2020 the Welsh government is to have the power to vary income tax, following a referendum.

== Part II ==
The commission was initially planned to report on the assembly powers question by the end of 2013 but this deadline was extended and the report was published in March 2014. It was commonly known as "Silk II".

It made 61 recommendations including:

- An increase in the number of Assembly Members at the National Assembly to deal with an “overstretched” legislature which “causes problems for effective governance”. It was hinted that there should be “at least” 80 Members (20 more than present) as called for by the Richard Commission report published in 2004.
- An increase in the National Assembly's power to decide on energy projects in Wales, raising the limit to 350 megawatts (up from the current limit of 50 MW).
- Regionalisation of governance of the BBC Trust and responsibility for spending for S4C.
- Devolution of responsibility over the water industry.
- Devolution of regulatory powers over transport including ports, rail, buses and taxis and a greater say in determining the rail franchise.
- Devolution of responsibility for drink-drive and speed limits.
- Devolution of policing to Wales as in Scotland and Northern Ireland.
- Devolution of youth justice. The devolution of criminal justice as a whole should be reviewed in 10 years' time to see whether distinct Welsh law had developed to merit it.
- A Scottish-style “reserved powers” model for the constitution. A list of policy areas should be reserved to UK jurisdiction, with everything else considered devolved. This is the reverse of the current system where a list of issues is devolved and everything else is considered reserved to the UK. The current system has been criticised for creating confusion over the extent of the National Assembly’s powers, with three bills passed by it referred to the Supreme Court in London.

The majority of the recommendations of Silk II went into the St David's Day Agreement, which was announced on 27 February 2015, and also into command paper Powers for a Purpose: Towards a Lasting Devolution Settlement for Wales. After the 2015 United Kingdom general election a Wales bill was announced with the purpose of carrying forward the implementation of the recommendations into legislation. The bill was passed into law as the Wales Act 2017.

== Reaction ==
The second part of the commission report was more controversial than the first. Concern was expressed by both the Welsh Government and UK politicians about perceived public opposition to an increase in the number of politicians. UK Ministers had argued against “radical change” to the devolution settlement in their own submission to the commission, leading to concerns that the UK government might not implement the recommendations. Secretary of State for Wales, David Jones said:

“We will consider implementing some of the changes the Commission has recommended during this Parliament. But there is insufficient time remaining in this Parliament to implement any changes that require primary legislation. These will therefore be a matter for the next Government and Parliament, and for political parties to set out their proposals and intentions to the electorate ahead of the General Election in 2015.”

The proposals formed part of the UK Labour party's manifesto for the 2015 general election campaign despite the suggestion of some Labour MPs that they might not.
