= Welsh Rates of Income Tax =

Welsh Rates of Income Tax (WRIT) (Welsh: Cyfradd Treth Incwm Cymru (CTIC)) is part of the UK income tax system and from 6 April 2019 a proportion of income tax paid by taxpayers living in Wales is transferred straight to the Welsh Government to fund Welsh public services. It is administered by HM Revenue and Customs (HMRC), but it is not a devolved tax comparable to Scottish income tax.

== History ==
The Wales Act 2014, which received Royal Assent on 17 December 2014, gave the National Assembly for Wales the power to set a Welsh basic, higher and additional rate of income tax to be charged on people living in Wales.

From 6 April 2019 the UK government reduced the three rates of UK income tax (basic, higher and additional) paid by people in Wales 10p. The Welsh Government decided the WRIT on the Welsh three rates, which added to the reduced UK rates. The Welsh Parliament can set Welsh rates anything from zero to any number in the pound. These Welsh rates are then added to each of the UK income tax rates after 10p in the pound has been deducted from each rate. The reduction in the three rates of income tax by the UK government reduced the amount of tax paid to HM Treasury. If the Welsh rates of income tax are set at less than 10p, the UK Government will recover the money it does not collect from Wales by reducing Wales' block grant. WRIT rates for the 2019–20 year have been left at 10p, so income tax in Wales will be the same as those in England.

The Welsh Revenue Authority collects and manages Land Transaction Tax and Landfill Disposals Tax in Wales since 2018; WRIT continues to be collected by HMRC from Welsh taxpayers as one payment and then transfers WRIT receipts to the Welsh Government. The block grant was reduced as a result.

== WRIT tax rates ==
The rates in the table are those rates imposed by the Welsh Government. They exclude the standard UK personal allowance and the reduced income tax rates which are collected by the UK Government. Those earning more than £100,000 have a reduced personal allowance.

Rate	WRIT	Income band
2019 – 2021
Basic rate	10%	£1 – £37,500
Higher rate	10%	£37,501 – £150,000
Additional rate	10%	Above £150,000
2021 – 2023
Basic rate	10%	£1 – £37,700
Higher rate	10%	£37,701 – £150,000
Additional rate	10%	Above £150,000
2023 – 2026
Basic rate	10%	£1 – £37,700
Higher rate	10%	£37,701 – £125,140
Additional rate	10%	Above £125,140
