= Declaratory power =

The declaratory power, in Scots law, is an unusual power held by the High Court of Justiciary, which enables it to declare behaviour to be criminal, even if that behaviour had not been previously defined as criminal activity.

This power has been used conservatively in the modern period, generally only in cases where an act is clearly comparable to an existing crime; it has, for example, been used to declare the selling of glue-sniffing kits criminal. As the specific boundaries of many offences are left somewhat loosely defined, it can be difficult to distinguish the application of the declaratory power from cases where the court interprets existing legislation to cover new situations.
