= Business rates in Wales =

Business rates (Welsh: Ardrethi busnes) is the commonly used name of non-domestic rates (Welsh: ardrethi annomestig) in Wales, a tax on occupation of non-domestic property. Rates are a property tax used to fund local services that date back to ancient times.

== History ==
Business rates in Wales have ancient roots, and were only formalised by the Vagabonds Act 1572 which modernized the system under the Tudor Poor Laws. The system was further reformed by the Poor Relief Act 1601.

The 1601 act was repealed in 1967, and replaced by the predecessor to business rates, the General Rate Act 1967. This was subsequently reformed in the Local Government Finance Act 1988. That act established business rates in England and Wales from 1990.

In 1989, domestic properties were removed from the rating system with the introduction of the Poll Tax, later to be replaced with Council Tax.

=== Welsh Government control ===
In 2015, powers to adjust business rates were devolved to the Welsh Government. The rates provide an income of approximately £1bn in Wales.

== Scope ==
The Local Government Finance Act 1988 introduced a new system of business rates in England and Wales from 1990, further amended by the Local Government Finance Act 1992.

== See also ==
- Taxation in Wales
- Local income tax
- Taxation in the United Kingdom
- Rates
- Local government in the United Kingdom:Funding
