= Wales Act 2017 =

British law dealing with devolution

Wales Act 2017 (Note: Section 72.)
- Act of Parliament
- Parliament of the United Kingdom
- Long title: An Act to amend Government of Wales Act 2006 and the Wales Act 2014 and to make provision about the functions of the Welsh Ministers and about Welsh tribunals; and for connected purposes.
- Citation: 2017 c. 4
- Introduced by: Alun Cairns (Commons); Lord Bourne of Aberystwyth (Lords)
- Territorial extent: United Kingdom

Dates
- Royal assent: 31 January 2017
- Commencement: Various (Note: Section 71.)
Other legislation
Amends	Coastguard Act 1925; Agriculture Act 1947; Harbours Act 1964; Oil Taxation Act 1975; Rent Act 1977; Import of Live Fish (England and Wales) Act 1980; Public Passenger Vehicles Act 1981; Mental Health Act 1983; National Audit Act 1983; Representation of the People Act 1983; Road Traffic Regulation Act 1984; Inheritance Tax Act 1984; Transport Act 1985; Representation of the People Act 1985; Road Traffic Act 1988; Electricity Act 1989; Town and Country Planning Act 1990; Human Fertilisation and Embryology Act 1990; Water Industry Act 1991; Taxation of Chargeable Gains Act 1992; Finance Act 1993; Judicial Pensions and Retirement Act 1993; Coal Industry Act 1994; Merchant Shipping Act 1995; Education Act 1996; Government of Wales Act 1998; Petroleum Act 1998; Care Standards Act 2000; Local Government Act 2000; Transport Act 2000; Utilities Act 2000; Political Parties, Elections and Referendums Act 2000; Capital Allowances Act 2001; Office of Communications Act 2002; Female Genital Mutilation Act 2003; Energy Act 2004; Constitutional Reform Act 2005; Public Services Ombudsman (Wales) Act 2005; Commissioners for Revenue and Customs Act 2005; Gambling Act 2005; Education Act 2005; Commissioner for Older People (Wales) Act 2006; Legislative and Regulatory Reform Act 2006; Government of Wales Act 2006; Tribunals, Courts and Enforcement Act 2007; Statistics and Registration Service Act 2007; Consumers, Estate Agents and Redress Act 2007; Regulatory Enforcement and Sanctions Act 2008; Human Fertilisation and Embryology Act 2008; Climate Change Act 2008; Planning Act 2008; Marine and Coastal Access Act 2009; Welfare Reform Act 2009; Equality Act 2010; Flood and Water Management Act 2010; Corporation Tax Act 2010; Budget Responsibility and National Audit Act 2011; Police Reform and Social Responsibility Act 2011; Localism Act 2011; Marine Licensing (Exempted Activities) (Wales) Order 2011; Welsh Language (Wales) Measure 2011; Protection of Freedoms Act 2012; Special Educational Needs Tribunal for Wales Regulations 2012; Energy Act 2013; Public Audit (Wales) Act 2013; Anti-social Behaviour, Crime and Policing Act 2014; Water Act 2014; Wales Act 2014; Counter-Terrorism and Security Act 2015; Deregulation Act 2015; Small Business, Enterprise and Employment Act 2015; Infrastructure Act 2015; Housing and Planning Act 2016; Immigration Act 2016
Amended by	Counter-Terrorism and Security Act 2015; European Union Withdrawal (Consequential Modifications) (EU Exit) Regulations 2020; Additional Learning Needs and Education Tribunal (Wales) Act 2018 (Consequential Amendments) Regulations 2021; Planning and Infrastructure Act 2025
Relates to	Harbours Act 1964; Police Reform and Social Responsibility Act 2011; Scotland Act 2016

Status: Amended

History of passage through Parliament

Text of statute as originally enacted

Revised text of statute as amended

The Wales Act 2017 (c. 4) is an act of the Parliament of the United Kingdom. It sets out amendments to the Government of Wales Act 2006 and devolves further powers to Wales. The legislation is based on the proposals of the St David's Day Command Paper.

== Background ==
The bill was proposed by the Conservative Party in its manifesto for the 2015 general election.

The draft Wales Bill was presented in October 2015 and faced much criticism from the public over tests for competence (also known as "necessity tests"). As a result, the bill had been put on hold by the beginning of 2016. An amended bill was introduced into the House of Commons on 1 June 2016.

== Main provisions ==
One of the most important provisions is that the act moved Wales from a conferred matters model to a reserved matters model, which is used in Scotland under the Scotland Act 1998. The act repealed the provision of the Wales Act 2014 for a referendum in Wales on devolution of income tax.

The act gives further powers to the National Assembly for Wales and the Welsh Government:

- The ability to amend sections of the Government of Wales Act 2006 which relate to the operation of the National Assembly for Wales and the Welsh Government within the United Kingdom, including control of its electoral system (subject to a two-thirds majority within the Assembly) for any proposed change.
- The ability to use such amendment to devolve powers to the National Assembly for Wales and the Welsh Ministers over areas such as road signs, onshore oil and gas activity, harbours, rail franchising, energy efficiency, and advice.
- The power to change the name of the National Assembly for Wales. On 9 October 2019 the Assembly agreed that the new name would be Welsh Parliament / Senedd Cymru. It came into effect in May 2020.
- The ability to raise or lower income tax by up to 10p in the pound
- The power to extend the eligibility to vote
- The Welsh Government to have increased borrowing powers to support capital investment, up to £1 billion
- Extended powers over equalities
- Extended powers over tribunals
- Creation of the Welsh Revenue Authority, a tax authority for Welsh devolved taxes while HMRC collects taxes that are not devolved to Wales

The act recognised the National Assembly for Wales and the Welsh Government as permanent among UK's constitutional arrangements, with a referendum required before either can be abolished. The act has also recognised that there is a body of Welsh law and it established the position of President of Welsh Tribunals.

== See also ==
- Welsh devolution
- Government of Wales Act 1998
- Government of Wales Act 2006
- Wales Act 2014
