= St David's Day Agreement =

Official UK document proposing further devolution to Wales

Powers for a Purpose: Towards a Lasting Devolution Settlement for Wales
- Created: 27 February 2015
- Location: Millennium Stadium, Cardiff; St David's Day Command Paper
- Author(s): Government of the United Kingdom
- Purpose: To establish a lasting devolution settlement for Wales.

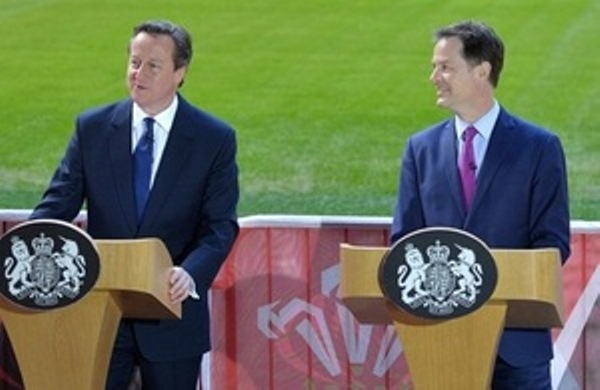
David Cameron (left) and Nick Clegg (right) announcing the St David's Day Agreement at the Millennium Stadium

The St David's Day Agreement, also known as the St David's Command Paper, is a command paper which set out the proposals of the UK coalition government. It was published in the command paper Powers for a purpose: Towards a lasting devolution settlement for Wales. The document was announced on 27 February 2015, by Prime Minister David Cameron and Deputy Prime Minister Nick Clegg at the Millennium Stadium in Cardiff, Wales.

== Recommendations ==
The document's recommendations include:

- Energy projects up to 350 megawatts should be decided by the Welsh Government. This would include most offshore wind farms and renewable technologies to harness tidal power and fracking.
- The National Assembly should have powers over the development of ports to improve Wales' transport infrastructure.
- The National Assembly should have the power to lower the voting age to 16 for Assembly elections. The Assembly already had the power to lower the voting age to 16 for a referendum on devolving income tax powers.
- All powers relating to National Assembly and local government elections should be devolved. This includes deciding the electoral system, the number of constituencies, their boundaries, the timing of elections, and the conduct of the elections themselves.
- The Welsh Government should have the power to appoint one member of the Ofcom board to represent Welsh interests.
- A review should be carried out of Air Passenger Duty which could open the door for it to be devolved to Wales.
- The agreement says the Welsh Government should be able to set its own speed limits and transport regulation for ports, taxis and buses.

The majority of the recommendations of the second report by the Commission on Devolution in Wales, commonly known as Silk II, have gone into this command paper.

== Criticism ==
The command paper was criticised by the Welsh Government for "not [treating Wales] with the same respect as being afforded to Scotland". Plaid Cymru, a Welsh nationalist party, called the recommendations "3rd rate devolution".

== See also ==
- Welsh devolution
