= John Thomas, Baron Thomas of Cwmgiedd =

British judge (born 1947)

The Right Honourable The Lord Thomas of Cwmgiedd PC FLSW
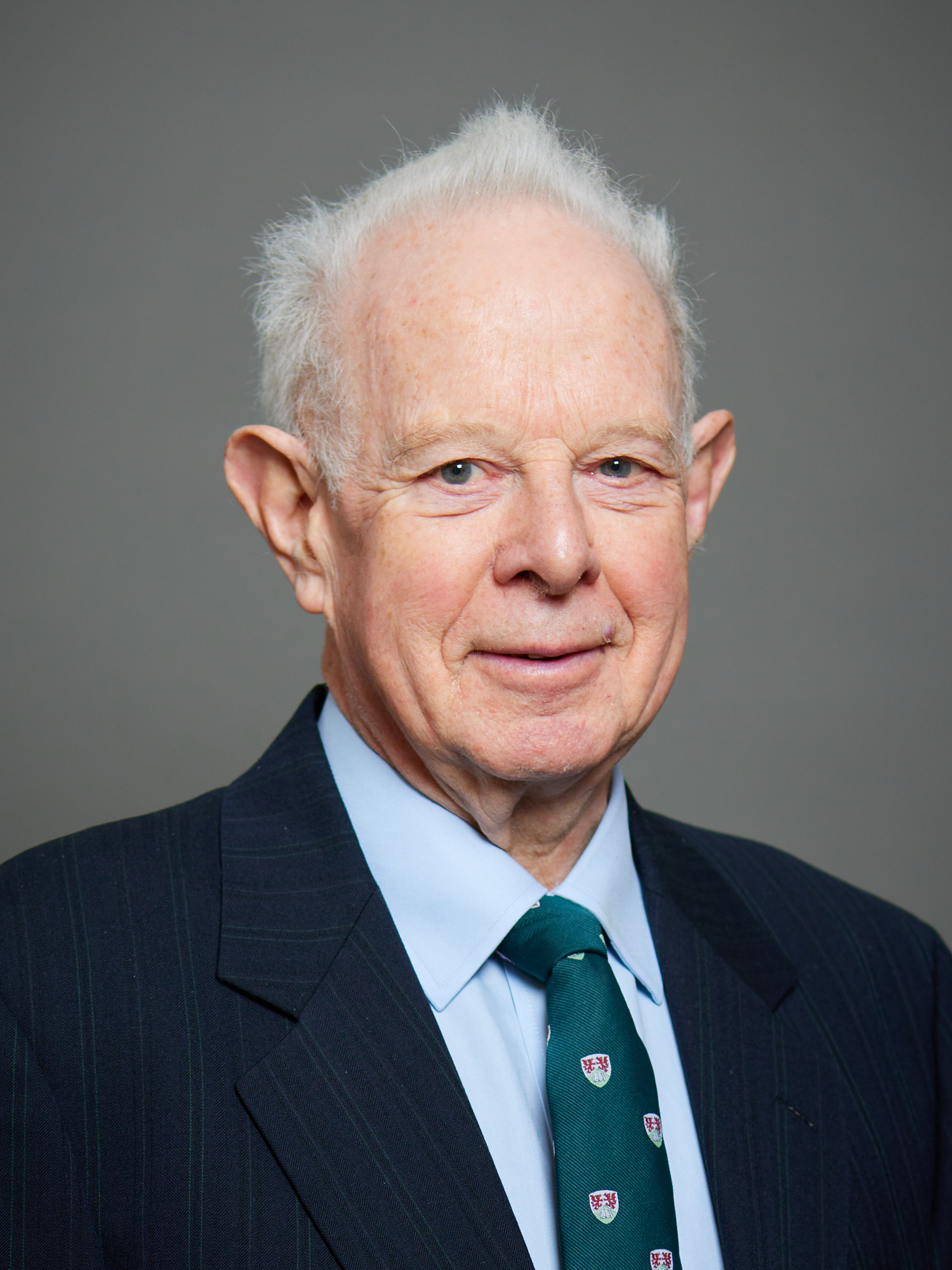
- Thomas in 2022

Member of the House of Lords
- Lord Temporal
- Life peerage 4 October 2013

Lord Chief Justice of England and Wales
- In office 1 October 2013 – 1 October 2017
- Nominated by: Chris Grayling
- Appointed by: Elizabeth II
- Preceded by: The Lord Judge
- Succeeded by: The Lord Burnett of Maldon

President of the Queen's Bench Division
- In office 3 October 2011 – 1 October 2013
- Deputy: Dame Heather Hallett
- Preceded by: Sir Anthony May
- Succeeded by: Sir Brian Leveson

Lord Justice of Appeal
- In office 14 July 2003 – 3 October 2011

Personal details
- Born: 22 October 1947 (age 78) Wales, United Kingdom
- Spouse: Elizabeth Ann Buchanan (m. 1973)
- Children: 2
- Education: Trinity Hall, Cambridge; University of Chicago

Roger John Laugharne Thomas, Baron Thomas of Cwmgiedd, PC FLSW (born Carmarthen, 22 October 1947) is a British judge. He served as Lord Chief Justice of England and Wales from 2013 to 2017. He sits in the House of Lords as a crossbencher.

== Early life and education ==
Thomas was born in 1947 to Roger Edward Laugharne Thomas and his wife Dinah Agnes Thomas, of Cwmgiedd.

Thomas was educated at Rugby School and Trinity Hall, Cambridge, where he graduated with a first-class B.A. in law in 1969. He was elected a Fellow of Trinity Hall in 2004. He proceeded to the University of Chicago where he earned a J.D. degree and was a Commonwealth Fellow.

Thomas was an assistant teacher at Mayo College, Ajmer, India, from 1965 to 1966.

== Legal career ==
Thomas was called to the Bar in 1969 (Gray's Inn). He was elected a Bencher in 1992. He commenced practice in 1972, became a Queen's Counsel in 1984 and was appointed a Recorder in 1987. He practiced as a member of the commercial chambers at 4 Essex Court in the Temple, which in 1994 moved to Lincoln's Inn Fields and has since then been known as Essex Court Chambers.

In 1992 he was appointed by the Department of Trade and Industry as an Inspector into the affairs of Mirror Group Newspapers plc (when it was owned by Robert Maxwell) and its IPO.

On 11 January 1996, he was appointed a High Court judge, receiving the customary knighthood, and was assigned to the Queen's Bench Division, serving on the Commercial Court until his appointment to the Court of Appeal. From 1998 to 2001 he was a Presiding Judge of the Wales and Chester Circuit. On 14 July 2003, Thomas became a Lord Justice of Appeal and given the customary appointment to the Privy Council later that year. He served as the Senior Presiding Judge from 2003 to 2006, and President of the European Network of Councils for the Judiciary from 2008 to 2010, having participated in its founding in 2003–2004.

In October 2008, Thomas was appointed vice-president of the Queen's Bench Division and Deputy Head of Criminal Justice. On 3 October 2011, he succeeded Sir Anthony May as President of the Queen's Bench Division.

== Lord Chief Justice ==
On 1 October 2013, Thomas was appointed to succeed Lord Judge as Lord Chief Justice of England and Wales. On 26 September 2013, it was announced Thomas would become a life peer upon taking office as Lord Chief Justice. He was created a Life Peer on 4 October 2013, taking the title Baron Thomas of Cwmgiedd, of Cwmgiedd in the County of Powys. Following his introduction, as a serving member of the judiciary he was immediately disqualified from sitting in the House of Lords under section 137(3) of the Constitutional Reform Act 2005.

His disqualification from sitting in the House of Lords ceased on his retirement as Lord Chief Justice. He is a member of the EU Financial Affairs Sub-Committee and chaired the Middle Level Bill Committee in 2018.

== Other affiliations ==
He was appointed by the Government of Wales in September 2017 to chair a Commission on Justice in Wales. Commissioners were appointed in November 2017. The commission undertook a review of the justice system in Wales (for December 2017 – October 2019) and published its report in October 2019. The report "set a long term vision for the future of justice in Wales".

Thomas is one of the founding members of the European Law Institute, a non-profit organisation that conducts research, makes recommendations and provides practical guidance in the field of European legal development. He is a member of its executive committee.

He is an Honorary Fellow of Trinity Hall, Cambridge, and a Fellow of the Universities of Cardiff, Aberystwyth, Swansea and Bangor and an honorary Doctor of Law of the Universities of South Wales, the West of England, Wales and of Cardiff Metropolitan University. He is a Fellow of the Learned Society of Wales.

He served as chancellor of Aberystwyth University from January 2018 to January 2025.

He was appointed chairman of the Financial Markets Law Committee in November 2017. He returned to Essex Court Chambers in November 2017 and joined the Arbitrators at 24 Lincoln's Inn Fields. He was a founder of the AIDA Reinsurance and Insurance Arbitration Society in 1991 and is its president.

He has been President of Qatar International Court and Dispute Resolution Center, an international commercial court in Doha, Qatar.

== Personal life ==
In 1973, he married Elizabeth Ann Buchanan, daughter of S J Buchanan of Ohio, US. They have one son and one daughter.

He lists his recreations in Who's Who as gardens, walking and travel.

== Arms ==
Coat of arms of John Thomas, Baron Thomas of Cwmgiedd
Crest Upon a Helm with a Wreath Argent and Vert On a Mount Vert growing therefrom Scarlet Carnations flowering proper a Dragon passant Gules grasping in its dexter foreclaws a Caduceus Or. Escutcheon Argent a Pale Azure between two Swords palewise points upwards proper hilts and pommels Vert each surrounded by a Chevron Gules. Supporters Dexter a Red Kite Sinister A Cardinal both proper. Motto Llifed Cyfiawnder Fel Afon Gref (In English: Let justice flow like a strong river).

== See also ==
- List of Lords Justices of Appeal

Legal offices
Preceded by The Lord Judge	Lord Chief Justice; 2013–2017	Succeeded by The Lord Burnett of Maldon
Academic offices
Preceded by Emyr Jones Parry	President of Aberystwyth University; 2018–2025	Succeeded by Nicola Davies
Orders of precedence in the United Kingdom
Preceded by The Lord Bamford	Gentlemen; Baron Thomas of Cwmgiedd	Followed by The Lord Richards of Herstmonceux
