= Wales Act 2014 =

British law dealing with devolution

Wales Act 2014 (Note: Section 30(3).)
- Act of Parliament
- Parliament of the United Kingdom
- Long title: An Act to make provision about elections to and membership of the National Assembly for Wales; to make provision about the Welsh Assembly Government; to make provision about the setting by the Assembly of rates of income tax to be paid by Welsh taxpayers and about the devolution of taxation powers to the Assembly; to make related amendments to Part 4A of the Scotland Act 1998; to make provision about borrowing by the Welsh Ministers; to make miscellaneous amendments in the law relating to Wales; and for connected purposes.
- Citation: 2014 c. 29
- Introduced by: David Jones MP, Secretary of State for Wales (Commons); Baroness Randerson (Lords)
- Territorial extent: United Kingdom (Note: Section 30(2).)

Dates
- Royal assent: 17 December 2014
- Commencement: Various (Note: Section 29.)
Other legislation
Amends	Finance Act 1931; Law Commissions Act 1965; Taxes Management Act 1970; Welsh Development Agency Act 1975; Customs and Excise Management Act 1979; Local Government and Housing Act 1989; Taxation of Chargeable Gains Act 1992; Finance Act 1996; Government of Wales Act 1998; Scotland Act 1998; Finance Act 2003; Government of Wales Act 2006; Income Tax Act 2007; Finance Act 2009; Scotland Act 2012
Amended by	Wales Act 2017; Finance Act 2018; Dissolution and Calling of Parliament Act 2022; Senedd Cymru (Members and Elections) Act 2024

Status: Amended

Text of statute as originally enacted

Revised text of statute as amended

The Wales Act 2014 (c. 29) is an act of the Parliament of the United Kingdom.

The bill was introduced to the House of Commons on 20 March 2014 by Chief Secretary to the Treasury, Danny Alexander and Secretary of State for Wales, David Jones. The purpose of the bill was to implement some of the recommendations of the Silk Commission aimed at devolving further powers from the United Kingdom to Wales.

It passed the final hurdles in Parliament and received Royal assent on 17 December 2014, becoming law.

== Provisions ==
The act's provisions include the following:

- Devolving stamp duty, business rates and landfill tax to Wales and enabling the National Assembly for Wales to replace them with new taxes specific to Wales. Further taxes can also be devolved, with the agreement of the UK Parliament and the Welsh Assembly.
- Providing for a referendum in Wales on whether an element of income tax should be devolved. If there is a vote in favour then the Welsh Assembly will be able to set a Welsh income tax rate. Fluctuations in revenues will be managed by new borrowing powers for Welsh Ministers.
- Extending Welsh Assembly terms permanently from four to five years in order to reduce the chance of Assembly elections clashing with general elections to the Westminster Parliament as a result of the Fixed-term Parliaments Act 2011.
- Removing the prohibition on candidates in National Assembly for Wales elections from standing in a constituency and also being on the regional list.
- Prohibiting members of the National Assembly for Wales from also being MPs.
- Formally changing the Welsh Assembly Government’s name to the Welsh Government.
- Clarifying the position of the First Minister between dissolution of the Assembly and an Assembly election.
- Allowing Welsh Ministers to set a limit for the amount of housing debt that individual local housing authorities in Wales may hold. The UK Treasury will limit the total Welsh housing debt.
- Requiring the Law Commission to provide advice and information to Welsh Ministers on the law reform matters that they referred to the Commission.

== See also ==
- Welsh devolution
- Commission on Devolution in Wales
- St David's Day Agreement
- Wales Act 2017
- Government of Wales Act 2006
