= List of UK Parliament constituencies in West Glamorgan =

The preserved county of West Glamorgan is divided into five parliamentary constituencies: two borough constituencies and three county constituencies.

== Constituencies ==
Name
1. Aberavon CC
2. Gower CC
3. Neath CC
4. Swansea East BC
5. Swansea West BC
Current boundaries

Parliamentary constituencies in West Glamorgan

The current boundaries have been effective since the 2007 National Assembly for Wales election and the 2010 United Kingdom general election. The only change from the previous scheme was a minute realignment of the boundary between Gower and Neath far too small to show on the map.

Constituency	Electorate	Majority	Member of Parliament	Nearest opposition	Map reference above
Aberavon	50,747	10,490	Stephen Kinnock ‡	Charlotte Lang †	1
Gower	61,762	1,837	Tonia Antoniazzi ‡	Francesca O'Brien †	2
Neath	56,416	5,637	Christina Rees ‡	Jon Burns †	3
Swansea East	58,450	7,970	Carolyn Harris ‡	Denise Howard †	4
Swansea West	57,078	8,116	Geraint Davies ‡	James Price †	5

== Proposed boundary changes ==
The Boundary Commission for Wales submitted their final proposals in respect of the Sixth Periodic Review of Westminster Constituencies (the 2018 review) in September 2018. Although the proposals were immediately laid before Parliament they were not brought forward by the Government for approval. Accordingly, they did not come into effect for the 2019 election which took place on 12 December 2019, and which was contested using the constituency boundaries in place since 2010.

Under the terms of the Parliamentary Voting System and Constituencies Act 2011, the Sixth Review was based on reducing the total number of MPs from 650 to 600 and a strict electoral parity requirement that the electorate of all constituencies should be within a range of 5% either side of the electoral quota.

On 24 March 2020, the Minister of State for the Cabinet Office, Chloe Smith, issued a written statement to Parliament setting out the Government's thinking with regard to parliamentary boundaries. They propose to bring forward primary legislation to remove the statutory obligation to implement the 2018 Boundary Review recommendations, as well as set the framework for future boundary reviews in time for the next review which is due to begin in early 2021 and report no later than October 2023. It is proposed that the number of constituencies now remains at the current level of 650, rather than being reduced to 600, while retaining the requirement that the electorate should be no more than +/- 5% from the electoral quota.

== Historical representation by party (whole of Glamorgan) ==
A cell marked → (with a different colour background to the preceding cell) indicates that the previous MP continued to sit under a new party name.

=== 1832 to 1885 ===
Conservative Liberal Peelite Radical Whig

Constituency	1832	1835	1837	1841	1847	51	1852	52	55	1857	1859	1865	1868	1874	1880
Cardiff Boroughs	Nicholl						Coffin			Crichton-Stuart	→				Reed
Glamorganshire	L. W. Dillwyn	Wyndham-Quin			Tyler					H. Vivian	→				
Glamorganshire	Talbot										→				
Merthyr Tydvil	Guest							Bruce			→		Richard		
Merthyr Tydvil													Fothergill		James
Swansea Boroughs	J. Vivian								L. L. Dillwyn		→				

=== 1885 to 1918 ===
Conservative Independent Labour Labour Liberal Liberal-Labour Liberal Unionist

Constituency	1885	1886	87	88	90	1892	93	1895	1900	04	1906	09	Jan 1910	10	Dec 1910	15
Cardiff District of Boroughs	Reed							Maclean	Reed	→	Guest		D. Thomas		Crichton-Stuart	Cory
Glamorganshire, East	A. Thomas														C. Edwards	
Glamorganshire, Mid	Talbot				Evans									Gibbins	J. H. Edwards	
Glamorganshire, South	A. Williams							Wyndham-Quin			Brace	→				
Gower	Yeo			Randell					J. Thomas		J. Williams		→			
Merthyr Tydfil (two MPs)	Richard			D. A. Thomas									Rees Jones			
Merthyr Tydfil (two MPs)	James			Morgan					Hardie							Stanton
Rhondda	Abraham												→			→
Swansea District	Vivian	→	→				W. Williams	Jones								T. Williams
Swansea Town	Dillwyn					Burnie		Llewellyn	Newnes				Mond			

=== 1918 to 1950 ===
Coalition Liberal (1918-22) / National Liberal (1922-23) Coalition National Democratic & Labour Conservative Independent Labour Party Labour Liberal National Government National Labour National Liberal (1931-68)

Constituency	1918	19	20	21	22	1922	1923	1924	1929	31	1931	32	33	34	1935	38	39	40	42	45	1945	46
Aberavon	J. Edwards					MacDonald			Cove													
Aberdare	Stanton					Hall																D. Thomas
Llandaff & Barry	Cope								Lloyd		Munro								Lakin		Ungoed-Thomas	
Caerphilly	Onions			M. Jones													N. Edwards					
Cardiff Central	Gould							Lougher	Bennett	→											G. Thomas	
Cardiff East	Seager					Lougher	Webb	Kinloch-Cooke	Edmunds		Temple-Morris								Grigg		Marquand	
Cardiff South	Cory						Henderson	H. Evans	Henderson		H. Evans										Callaghan	
Gower	J. Williams				Grenfell																	
Merthyr	Rees Jones					Wallhead					→		→	S. Davies								
Neath	J. H. Edwards					Jenkins														D. J. Williams		
Ogmore	Hartshorn									E. Williams												J. Evans
Pontypridd	Lewis				T. Jones					D. Davies						Pearson						
Rhondda East	Watts-Morgan												Mainwaring									
Rhondda West	Abraham		John																			
Swansea East	T. Williams	Matthews				D. Williams												Mort				
Swansea West	Mond						Samuel	Runciman	Samuel		L. Jones										P. Morris	

=== 1950 to 1983 ===
Conservative Independent Labour Labour Social Democratic Speaker

Constituency	1950	1951	54	1955	1959	63	1964	1966	67	68	1970	72	Feb 74	Oct 74	76	1979	81	82
Aberavon	Cove				J. Morris													
Aberdare	D. Thomas		Probert										I. Evans					
Barry	D. Rees	Gower																
Caerphilly	N. Edwards									A. Evans						E. Davies	→	
Cardiff West	G. Thomas														→			
Cardiff N / Cardiff NW ('74)	Llewellyn				Box			Rowlands			Roberts							
Cardiff SE	Callaghan																	
Gower	Grenfell				I. Davies													Wardell
Merthyr Tydfil	S. Davies										→	Rowlands						
Neath	D. J. Williams						Coleman											
Ogmore	Padley															Powell		
Pontypridd	Pearson										John							
Rhondda East	Mainwaring				E. Davies													
Rhondda W / Rhondda ('74)	I. Thomas								A. Jones									
Swansea East	Mort					McBride								Anderson				
Swansea West	P. Morris				H. Rees		A. Williams											
Cardiff North													Grist					

^{1}moved to Gwent 1983

=== 1983 to 2024 (16 seats) ===
Conservative Independent Labour Liberal Democrats

Constituency	1983	84	1987	89	91	1992	1997	2001	02	2005	2010	12	2015	16	2017	2019	22	23	24
Aberavon	Morris							Francis					Kinnock						
Cardiff S & Penarth	Callaghan		Michael									Doughty							
Cynon Valley	I. Evans	Clwyd														Winter			
M Tydfil & Rhymney ^{1}	Rowlands							Havard					G. Jones						
Neath	Coleman				Hain								Rees				→		→
Ogmore	Powell								Irranca-Davies					Elmore					
Pontypridd	John			Howells							O. Smith					Davies-Jones			
Rhondda	Rogers							Bryant											
Swansea East	Anderson									James			Harris						
Swansea West	A. Williams										G. Davies							→	
Cardiff West	Terlezki		Morgan					Brennan											
Gower	Wardell						Caton						B. Davies		Antoniazzi				
Bridgend	Hubbard-Miles		Griffiths							Moon						Wallis			
Cardiff Central	Grist					Owen Jones				Willott			Stevens						
Cardiff North	G. H. Jones						Morgan				J. Evans		C. Williams		McMorrin				
Vale of Glamorgan	Gower			J. Smith		Sweeney	J. Smith				Cairns								

^{1} partly in Gwent 1997–2024

=== 2024 to present (13 seats) ===
Labour

Constituency	2024
Aberafan Maesteg	Kinnock
Bridgend	Elmore
Cardiff East	Stevens
Cardiff North	McMorrin
Cardiff South and Penarth	Doughty
Cardiff West	Barros-Curtis
Gower	Antoniazzi
Merthyr Tydfil and Aberdare	Jones
Neath and Swansea East	Harris
Pontypridd	Davies-Jones
Rhondda and Ogmore	Bryant
Swansea West	Bell
Vale of Glamorgan	Narayan

== See also ==
- List of parliamentary constituencies in Wales
