= YDN =

YDN may refer to:

- The Yale Daily News, published by Yale University students in New Haven, Connecticut
- Lt. Col W.G. (Billy) Barker VC Airport (IATA: YDN, ICAO: CYDN)
- Ysgol Dyffryn Nantlle, a secondary school in North Wales.
