= Welsh Woman of the Year =

The Welsh Woman of the Year award was inaugurated in 1994 by Western Mail to honour high-achieving women in Wales. Its stated aim is "to promote the role women have in the workplace and in every sector of society". The award is sponsored by the National Assembly for Wales, the University of South Wales and several other high-profile organisations.

Past winners of the award have been:

1994 - Dr Elizabeth Haywood
1995 - Lynda Lumb
1996 - Professor Ilora Finlay
1997 - Angela Gidden
1998 - Professor Valerie Randle
1999 - Ann Taylor
2000 - Dr Olwen Williams
2001 - Tanni Grey-Thompson
2002 - Jacqueline Royall
2003 - Sarah Cornelius-Price
2004 - Susan Balsom
2005 - Karen Robson
2006 - Siân Eirian
2007 - Rhoda Emlyn Jones.
2008 - Professor Judith Hall
2009
2010 - Connie Parry
2011 - Helen Molyneux, managing partner for NewLaw Solicitors
