= 1991 Neath by-election =

British House of Commons by-election

- 4 April 1991

Constituency of Neath
- Turnout: 64.0% (▼14.8%)
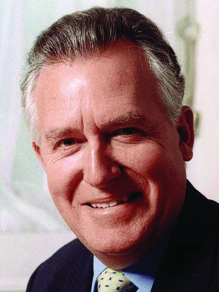
	First party	Second party	Third party
		PC	Con
Candidate	Peter Hain	Dewi Evans	Richard Evans
Party	Labour	Plaid Cymru	Conservative
Popular vote	17,962	8,132	2,995
Percentage	51.7%	23.3%	8.6%
Swing	▼11.7%	▲16.9%	▼7.5%
	Fourth party	Fifth party
	LD	SDP
Candidate	David Lloyd	John Warman
Party	Liberal Democrats	SDP
Popular vote	2,000	1,826
Percentage	5.8%	5.3%
Swing	N/A	▼8.8%
MP before election
Donald Coleman
Labour
Subsequent MP
Peter Hain
Labour

The 1991 Neath by-election was a by-election held on 4 April 1991 for the House of Commons constituency of Neath in Wales. It was won by the Labour Party candidate Peter Hain.

== Vacancy ==
The seat had become vacant when the sitting Labour Member of Parliament (MP), Donald Coleman, died on 14 January 1991. Coleman had already announced his intention to stand down at the next election, so Peter Hain had already been selected to contest the seat.

== Result ==
Peter Hain retained Neath easily for Labour, although there was a 14% swing to Plaid Cymru.

1991 Neath by-election
Party	Candidate	Votes	%	±%
Labour	Peter Hain	17,962	51.7	−11.7
Plaid Cymru	Dewi Evans	8,132	23.3	+16.9
Conservative	Richard Evans	2,995	8.6	−7.5
Liberal Democrats	David Lloyd	2,000	5.8	−8.3
SDP	John Warman	1,826	5.3	−8.8
Local Independent Labour	Rhys Jeffreys	1,253	3.6	N/A
Monster Raving Loony	David Sutch	263	0.8	N/A
Captain Beany of the Bean Party	Barry Kirk	262	0.7	N/A
Majority		9,830	28.4	−18.9
Turnout		34,753	64.0	−14.8
Registered electors		54,482		
Labour hold		Swing	+2.0	

== Previous result ==
General election 1987: Neath
Party	Candidate	Votes	%	±%
Labour	Donald Coleman	27,612	63.4	+9.8
Conservative	Martin Howe	7,034	16.1	−1.3
SDP	John Warman	6,132	14.1	−7.3
Plaid Cymru	Huw John	2,792	6.4	−0.8
Majority		20,578	47.3	+15.1
Turnout		43,570	78.8	+2.3
Registered electors		55,261		
Labour hold		Swing		

== See also ==
- Neath (UK Parliament constituency)
- Lists of United Kingdom by-elections

== Sources ==
Times Guide to the House of Commons 1992
