= Gwyn Williams (politician) =

Welsh politician

Gwyn Williams MS
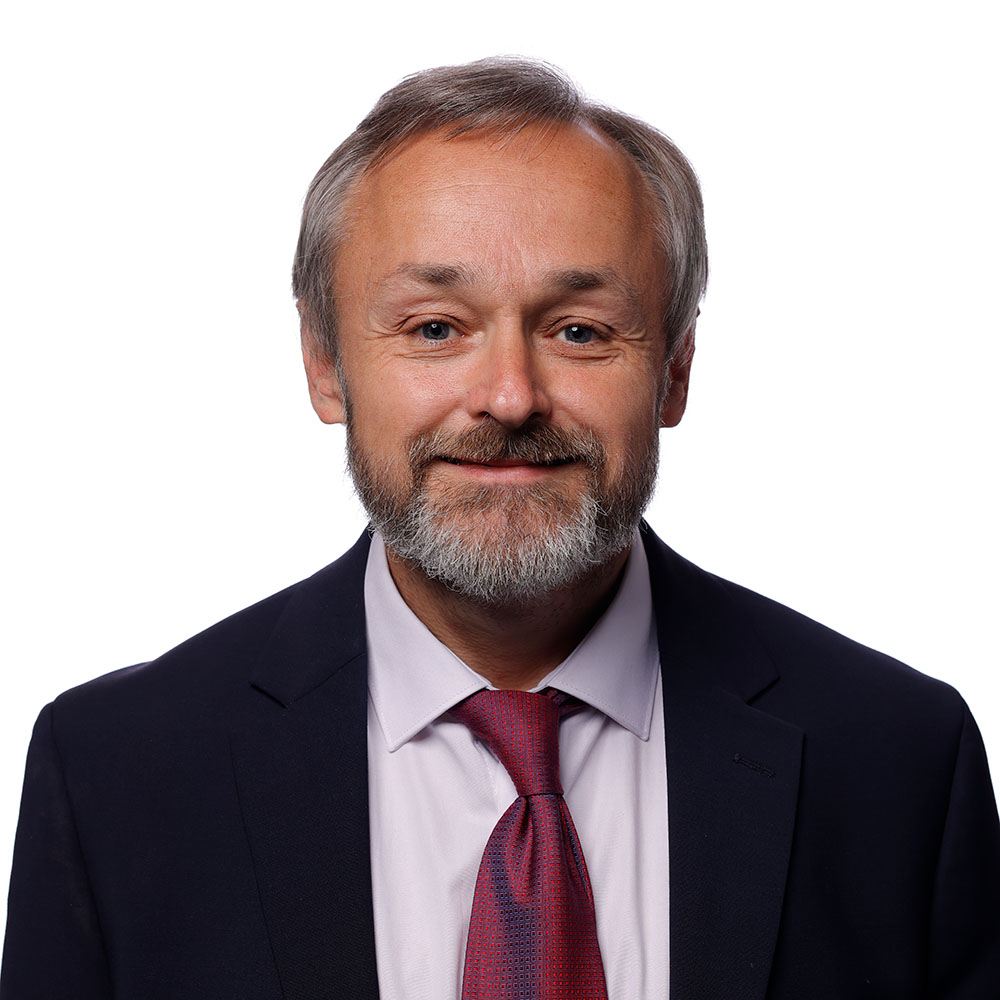
- Official portrait, 2026

Member of the Senedd
- Incumbent
- Assumed office 8 May 2026
- Constituency: Gŵyr Abertawe

Personal details
- Born: Neath, Wales
- Party: Plaid Cymru
- Spouse: Safa Elhassan

Gwyn Samuel Williams (born 1979 or 1980) is a Welsh politician from Plaid Cymru who has served as a Member of the Senedd (MS) for the Gŵyr Abertawe constituency since 2026

== Medical career ==
Dr Gwyn Williams is a consultant ophthalmologist working at Swansea Bay University Health Board. He most recently worked at Singleton Hospital in Swansea, and is an honorary associate professor at Swansea University. He specialises in retina care.

== Political career ==
Williams was a campaigner for Yes for Wales in the 1990s; he joined Plaid Cymru in c. 2016.

He was a candidate in Swansea West at the 2024 United Kingdom general election. In the election, he came fourth place behind Torsten Bell.

In the 2026 Senedd election, Williams was elected as a MS for the Gŵyr Abertawe constituency.

== Personal life ==
Williams is married to Safa Elhassan, who he met whilst both were doing their ophthalmology training. He was elected as an MS alongside her in 2026, making the couple the second ever married couple to simultaneously serve in the Senedd (following Lynne Neagle and Huw Lewis). As of 2026, they have a three-year-old daughter.
