= Alan Williams (Swansea West MP) =

British politician (1930–2014)

The Right Honourable Alan Williams
- Official portrait, 2005

Father of the House of Commons
- In office 5 May 2005 – 12 April 2010
- Speaker: Michael Martin; John Bercow
- Preceded by: Tam Dalyell
- Succeeded by: Sir Peter Tapsell

Shadow Secretary of State for Wales
- In office 13 July 1987 – 9 January 1989
- Leader: Neil Kinnock
- Preceded by: Barry Jones
- Succeeded by: Barry Jones

Member of Parliament for Swansea West
- In office 15 October 1964 – 12 April 2010
- Preceded by: Hugh Rees
- Succeeded by: Geraint Davies

Personal details
- Born: Alan John Williams; 14 October 1930 Caerphilly, Wales
- Died: 21 December 2014 (aged 84) London, England
- Party: Labour
- Spouse: (Mary) Patricia Rees (m. 1957)
- Children: 3, including Sian
- Education: University College, Oxford

Alan John Williams (14 October 1930 – 21 December 2014) was a British Labour politician who served as Member of Parliament (MP) for Swansea West for over 45 years, from 1964 to 2010. He was the longest serving MP for a Welsh constituency since David Lloyd George and built a reputation for his detailed scrutiny of the ways in which public money was spent.

== Early life ==
Williams was born in Caerphilly, the son of Emlyn, a former miner who became a local government officer, and Violet (née Ross). He was educated at Cardiff High School for Boys (a state grammar school) then Cardiff College of Technology and Commerce when he gained a BSc in economics in 1954 (awarded by the University of London). At University College, Oxford, he studied PPE. He became an economics lecturer at the Welsh College of Advanced Technology then a broadcaster and journalist.

== Member of Parliament for Swansea West ==
He unsuccessfully contested Poole in 1959, coming second to Conservative incumbent Richard Pilkington. Shortly afterwards he was selected as the candidate for Swansea West, which the Conservatives had won by a narrow majority of 403 votes.

The constituency, containing the city centre, the university and the relatively prosperous western suburbs, had historically been a marginal one for Labour, in contrast to the more working-class Swansea East. Percy Morris, elected in the Labour landslide of 1945, had seen his majority cut to just over a thousand votes in 1955 before the Conservative Hugh Rees unseated him four years later. Williams recaptured the seat in 1964, and held it for nearly 46 years. However, it was never entirely safe, and Rees tried unsuccessfully to recapture the seat in 1966 and 1970.

Williams had a very tight contest at the 1979 election, in the wake of the Winter of Discontent and divisions in Welsh Labour over devolution. He held on by only 401 votes, only two fewer than the Tory majority he had overturned in 1964. His majorities thereafter were more secure but the fact that the Liberal Democrats came close to winning the seat after his retirement in 2010 suggests that he had a substantial personal vote.

== Parliamentary career ==
Williams served under Prime Minister Harold Wilson as Under-Secretary of State for Economic Affairs from 1967 until 1969 and then as a Parliamentary Secretary at the Ministry of Technology until 1970, when Labour lost power and Conservative leader Edward Heath replaced Wilson as prime minister. When Labour were returned to power at the February 1974 general election, Williams was made Minister of State at the Department of Prices and Consumer Protection, serving until Wilson left office in 1976. The new prime minister, James Callaghan, then appointed him as Minister of State at the Department of Industry in which post he served until Labour lost power to Margaret Thatcher's Conservatives in the 1979 general election.

Williams was made a Privy Counsellor in 1977. He was a backbencher from 1989 to 2010, and chairman of the Liaison Committee from 2001 to 2010. He was a Eurosceptic and was opposed to the devolution settlement that established the National Assembly for Wales.

In 2003, he abstained on the parliamentary approval for the invasion of Iraq.

=== Father of the House ===
Following the retirement of Tam Dalyell at the 2005 general election, Williams became the MP with the longest continuous service in the House, earning him the title of Father of the House.

He was the last MP to question Prime Minister Tony Blair at Prime Minister's Questions on 27 June 2007. He congratulated Blair for giving the Labour Party ten years of government, called him one of the outstanding prime ministers of his time, and thanked him for making the Labour Party once again the "natural party of government".

Williams was the last parliamentary survivor of those who were elected in Wilson's 1964 election win. As Father of the House, Williams presided over the Commons Speaker election on 22 June 2009, in which MPs chose John Bercow as Speaker. He stood down from the Commons at the 2010 general election.

== Personal life ==
He married Mary Patricia Rees, who used her middle name in everyday life, in June 1957 in Bedwellty. They had two sons and a daughter, Sian.

== Death ==
He died at the age of 84 on 21 December 2014. He was in a nursing home in London after having a stroke six months prior to his death.

Parliament of the United Kingdom
Preceded by Hugh Rees	Member of Parliament for Swansea West; 1964–2010	Succeeded by Geraint Davies
Preceded by Tam Dalyell	Father of the House; 2005–2010	Succeeded by Peter Tapsell
Political offices
Preceded by Robert Sheldon	Chair of the Liaison Committee; 2001–2010	Succeeded by Alan Beith
