= Elizabeth Haywood =

Welsh businesswoman

Elizabeth Haywood CCMI FRSA MCIPR

Personal details
- Spouse: Peter Hain, Baron Hain (m. 2003)
- Education: Swansea University; Cardiff University
- Profession: businesswoman

Elizabeth Haywood is a Welsh businesswoman. She served as the director of Confederation of British Industry in Wales from 1994 to 2000. In 1994, she was named the first Welsh Woman of the Year.

== Education ==
Haywood is a graduate of Swansea and Cardiff Universities. She was the inaugural winner of 'Welsh Woman of the Year' in 1994 and has a career in public service in Wales. She began her career in the Welsh Development Agency and has subsequently held roles in Government, Third Sector and Private Sector Companies.

== Career ==
Haywood's career includes a spell in the secretariat of the European Parliament in the early 1980s, Director of CBI Wales (Confederation of British Industry, Wales) from 1994 to 2000, a role as Communications Director (2000-2001) of the Association of Train Operating Companies (ATOC) and as Director of the South East Wales Economic Forum (2010–13). In 2008 she established an LLP - Haywood Hain - with her husband the British politician, Peter Hain.

Dr Haywood has held Director and Executive Director Roles in various organisations and institutions. These include roles at Wales Millennium Centre (Trustee and Board Member), The Hendre Group (Vice Chair) and Leonard Cheshire Disability (Trustee and Board Member).

More recently, Dr Haywood has been involved in developing the 'City Deal' proposals for Cardiff and Swansea. She was appointed by the Welsh Minister for Business, Enterprise, Technology and Science to lead a panel. She is a member of The 30% Club, an organisation campaigning for diversity on company boards. Other jobs are in the arena of sustainability and natural resources. Dr Haywood is non-executive Director of Natural Resources Wales and of SP Energy Networks, part of the ScottishPower Group.

Elizabeth has acted as the Chair of the Independent Remuneration Board of the Senedd since 2020.
