= Valerie Randle =

British chemist

Professor Valerie Randle (Valerie Norris)
- Born: 1953 (age 72–73); United Kingdom
- Education: Cardiff University
- Occupations: Scientist, educator
- Spouse: Professor Christopher Norris
- Writing career
- Language: English
- Genres: Academic and Fiction
- Subject: Material Science and Engineering
- Notable awards: Rosenhain Medal, Welsh Woman of the Year 1998
- Website: norriswriting.com

Valerie Randle is a materials engineer who specialised in electron backscatter diffraction, grain boundary engineering, and has written a number of text books on the subject She was Welsh Woman of the Year in 1998 and in the same year was awarded the Rosenhain Award for achievements in Materials Science by the Institute of Materials, Minerals and Mining.In 2004, she was invited as a guest of HM the Queen to a luncheon at Buckingham Palace for the 'top 180 female achievers in the country'. From 2008 she has been included in Who's Who. as part of increasing public recognition of scientists. She has made significant contributions in the field of materials engineering with over 150 indexed publications in the field.

== Career ==
Randle entered Cardiff University at the age of 27 to study chemistry, and found that the metallurgy module sparked her interest in materials. She then did a PhD and eventually was awarded a Royal Society Research Fellowship which took her to Swansea University in 1992.

In 1999, she was made a professor in the Department of Metals Engineering, working within the field of microstructure of materials at Swansea University. Randle became Head of the Materials Research Centre in 2007–2009. She has published some 370 research papers and five textbooks, and given many invited lectures all over the world.

After twenty-five years at Swansea University, she retired in 2013.

As Valerie Norris she has published two novels, In the Long Run and The April Letters with Cambria Publishing.

== Personal life ==
Valerie Randle was born in 1953 and has lived in Wales since she moved there when she was eighteen. Randle left school when was sixteen, got married at eighteen and had two children by the age of twenty. In 2013, at age sixty, she chose to take early retirement.

== Publications ==
- The Measurement of Grain Boundary Geometry (Microscopy in Materials Science), 1993, ISBN 978-0367402358
- Grain Boundary Geometry in Polycrystals, 1993.
- Atlas of Backscattering Kikuchi Diffraction Patterns,1994, ISBN 978-0750302128
- The Role of the Coincidence Site Lattice in Grain Boundary Engineering, 1996, ISBN 978-1861250063
- Introduction to Texture Analysis: Macrotexture, Microtexture and Orientation Mapping, 2000, 2nd edn 2009, ISBN 978-1000997910
- Microtexture Determination and its Applications, 1992, 2nd edn 2003, ISBN 978-1906540111
