= Swansea West (UK Parliament constituency) =

UK Parliament constituency (1918–)

Coordinates: 51°37′06″N 3°59′11″W

- Borough constituency for the House of Commons
- Boundary of Swansea West in Wales
- Preserved county: West Glamorgan
- Electorate: 74,612 (March 2020)

Current constituency
- Created: 1918
- Member of Parliament: Torsten Bell (Labour)
- Seats: One
- Created from: Swansea and Gower

Overlaps
- Senedd: Gŵyr Abertawe

Swansea West (Welsh: Gorllewin Abertawe) is a constituency (Note: A borough constituency (for the purposes of election expenses and type of returning officer)) of the House of Commons of the Parliament of the United Kingdom. It elects one Member of Parliament (MP) by the first past the post system of election, and is currently represented by Torsten Bell of Labour, who was first elected in the constituency in 2024.

In the 2023 review of Westminster constituencies for the 2024 general election, the constituency boundaries were substantially altered. The Swansea West Senedd constituency currently has the constituency's borders as they existed before 2024.

== History ==
Since 1945, the seat has been held continuously by the Labour Party, except for the period 1959 to 1964 when it was captured by Conservative Hugh Rees. Alan Williams won the seat back for Labour in 1964 and held it until his retirement in 2010; from 2005 until his retirement he was the Father of the House. Williams was succeeded by Geraint Davies at the 2010 general election.

In June 2023 Davies was administratively suspended from the Labour Party after allegations were made of unwanted sexual attention on younger women. Davies continued to sit as an independent MP. 12 months later he still had not been given an opportunity by the party to answer the accusations. Because he was still suspended, he was unable to stand in the 2024 general election.

On 31 May Labour announced the selection of Torsten Bell, chief executive of the Resolution Foundation, as their candidate in the constituency. Bell has no connection to Swansea or Wales and the Party was accused of "parachuting" their favoured candidate, against the wishes of local party members. Bell subsequently won the 2024 election with a majority of 23.9%.

== Boundaries ==
Map of boundaries 1983-2024

1918–1950: The County Borough of Swansea wards of Alexandra, Bryn Melyn, Castle, Ffynone, St Helen's, and Victoria.

1950–1955: The County Borough of Swansea wards of Brynmelyn, Cockett, Ffynone, Oystermouth and Brynau, St Helen's, Sketty, Victoria, and Waunarlwydd.

1955–1983: The County Borough of Swansea wards of Brynmelin, Fforestfach, Ffynone, Mumbles, St Helen's, Sketty, Townhill, and Victoria.

1983–2024: The City and County of Swansea wards of Sketty, Castle, Killay South, Killay North, Dunvant, Uplands, Townhill, Cockett and Mayals.

Map of current boundaries

2024–present: Under the 2023 review, the constituency was defined as being composed of the following, as they existed on 1 December 2020:

- The City and County of Swansea wards of Castle, Cwmbwrla, Landore, Morriston, Mynydd-bach, Penderry, Sketty, Townhill, and Uplands.

Following a local government boundary review which came into effect in May 2022, the constituency now also includes the western section of the Waterfront ward from the 2024 general election.

The newly defined constituency saw significant changes, being expanded northwards to take in the majority of the abolished Swansea East constituency, comprising the Cwmbwrla, Landore, Morriston, Mynydd-bach and Penderry wards. Partly offsetting this, western areas comprising Killay, Dunvant, Cockett and Mayals were transferred to Gower.

== Members of Parliament ==
Election	Member	Party
1918	Sir Alfred Mond	Coalition Liberal
1922	Sir Alfred Mond	National Liberal
1923	Sir Alfred Mond	Liberal
1923	Howel Samuel	Labour
1924	Walter Runciman	Liberal
1929	Howel Samuel	Labour
1931	Sir Lewis Jones	Liberal National
1945	Percy Morris	Labour
1959	Hugh Rees	Conservative
1964	Alan Williams	Labour
2010	Geraint Davies	Labour Co-operative
2023	Geraint Davies	Independent
2024	Torsten Bell	Labour

== Elections ==
=== Elections in the 21st century ===
==== Elections in the 2020s ====
General election 2024: Swansea West
Party	Candidate	Votes	%	±%
Labour	Torsten Bell	14,761	41.4	−10.0
Reform	Patrick Benham-Crosswell	6,246	17.5	+10.7
Liberal Democrats	Michael O'Carroll	4,367	12.2	+5.8
Plaid Cymru	Gwyn Williams	4,105	11.5	+5.6
Conservative	Tara-Jane Sutcliffe	3,536	9.9	−18.8
Green	Peter Jones	2,305	6.5	+5.7
TUSC	Gareth Bromhall	337	0.9	N/A
Majority		8,515	23.9	+1.3
Turnout		35,657	48.0	−11.2
Registered electors		74,236		
Labour hold		Swing	▼10.3	

=== Elections in the 2010s ===
2019 notional result (Note: Estimate of the 2019 general election result as if the revised boundaries recommended under the 2023 boundary review were in place)
Party	Vote	%
Labour	22,709	51.4
Conservative	12,672	28.7
Brexit Party	3,022	6.8
Liberal Democrats	2,834	6.4
Plaid Cymru	2,595	5.9
Green Party	367	0.8
Majority	10,037	22.7
Turnout	44,199	59.2
Electorate	74,612	

General election 2019: Swansea West
Party	Candidate	Votes	%	±%
Labour Co-op	Geraint Davies	18,493	51.6	−8.2
Conservative	James Price	10,377	29.0	−2.3
Liberal Democrats	Michael O'Carroll	2,993	8.4	+5.0
Plaid Cymru	Gwyn Williams	1,984	5.5	+1.4
Brexit Party	Peter Hopkins	1,983	5.5	N/A
Rejected ballots		137		
Majority		8,116	22.6	−5.9
Turnout		35,830	62.8	−2.7
Registered electors		57,078		
Labour Co-op hold		Swing	-2.9	

Of the 137 rejected ballots:

- 117 were either unmarked or it was uncertain who the vote was for.
- 20 voted for more than one candidate.

General election 2017: Swansea West
Party	Candidate	Votes	%	±%
Labour Co-op	Geraint Davies	22,278	59.8	+17.2
Conservative	Craig Lawton	11,680	31.3	+8.7
Plaid Cymru	Rhydian Fitter	1,529	4.1	−2.3
Liberal Democrats	Michael O'Carroll	1,269	3.4	−5.6
Green	Mike Whittall	434	1.2	−3.9
Socialist (GB)	Brian Johnson	92	0.2	+0.1
Majority		10,598	28.5	+8.5
Turnout		37,345	65.5	+5.7
Registered electors		56,889		
Labour Co-op hold		Swing	+4.2	

General election 2015: Swansea West
Party	Candidate	Votes	%	±%
Labour Co-op	Geraint Davies ^{1}	14,967	42.6	+7.9
Conservative	Emma Lane	7,931	22.6	+1.8
UKIP	Martyn Ford	4,744	13.5	+11.5
Liberal Democrats	Chris Holley	3,178	9.0	−24.2
Plaid Cymru	Harri Roberts	2,266	6.4	+2.4
Green	Ashley Wakeling	1,784	5.1	+4.0
TUSC	Ronnie Job	159	0.5	±0.0
Independent	Maxwell Rosser	78	0.2	N/A
Socialist (GB)	Brian Johnson	49	0.1	N/A
Rejected ballots		116		
Majority		7,036	20.0	+18.5
Turnout		35,156	59.8	+1.8
Registered electors		58,776		
Labour Co-op hold		Swing	+3.1	

Of the 116 rejected ballots:

- 33 were either unmarked or it was uncertain who the vote was for.
- 83 voted for more than one candidate.

^{1} Geraint Davies is a Labour and Co-operative member but he was nominated as Welsh Labour.

General election 2010: Swansea West
Party	Candidate	Votes	%	±%
Labour Co-op	Geraint Davies	12,335	34.7	−7.1
Liberal Democrats	Peter May	11,831	33.2	+4.3
Conservative	René Kinzett	7,407	20.8	+4.8
Plaid Cymru	Harri Roberts	1,437	4.0	−2.5
BNP	Alan Bateman	910	2.6	N/A
UKIP	Timothy Jenkins	716	2.0	+0.2
Green	Keith Ross	404	1.1	−1.1
Independent	Ian McCloy	374	1.1	N/A
TUSC	Rob Williams	179	0.5	N/A
Majority		504	1.5	−11.4
Turnout		35,593	58.0	+0.9
Registered electors		61,334		
Labour Co-op hold		Swing	-5.7	

==== Elections in the 2000s ====
General election 2005: Swansea West
Party	Candidate	Votes	%	±%
Labour	Alan Williams	13,833	41.8	−6.9
Liberal Democrats	René Kinzett	9,564	28.9	+12.3
Conservative	Mohammed Abdel-Haq	5,285	16.0	−3.0
Plaid Cymru	Harri Roberts	2,150	6.5	−4.1
Green	Martyn Shrewsbury	738	2.2	+0.2
UKIP	Martyn Ford	609	1.8	−0.2
Veritas	Yvonne Holley	401	1.2	N/A
Socialist	Robert Williams	288	0.9	N/A
Legalise Cannabis	Steve Pank	218	0.7	N/A
Majority		4,269	12.9	−16.8
Turnout		33,086	57.1	+1.3
Registered electors		58,363		
Labour hold		Swing	-9.6	

General election 2001: Swansea West
Party	Candidate	Votes	%	±%
Labour	Alan Williams	15,644	48.7	−7.5
Conservative	Margaret Harper	6,094	19.0	−1.5
Liberal Democrats	Mike Day	5,313	16.6	+2.1
Plaid Cymru	Ian Titherington	3,404	10.6	+4.0
UKIP	Richard Lewis	653	2.0	N/A
Green	Martyn Shrewsbury	626	2.0	N/A
Socialist Alliance	Alec Thraves	366	1.1	N/A
Majority		9,550	29.7	−6.0
Turnout		32,100	55.8	−11.8
Registered electors		57,493		
Labour hold		Swing	-6.0	

=== Elections in the 20th century ===
==== Elections in the 1990s ====
General election 1997: Swansea West
Party	Candidate	Votes	%	±%
Labour	Alan Williams	22,748	56.2	+3.2
Conservative	Andrew Baker	8,289	20.5	−10.9
Liberal Democrats	John Newbury	5,872	14.5	+4.0
Plaid Cymru	Dai Lloyd	2,675	6.6	+2.8
Socialist Labour	David Proctor	885	2.2	N/A
Majority		14,459	35.7	+14.1
Turnout		40,469	67.6	−5.7
Registered electors		59,849		
Labour hold		Swing	+7.1	

General election 1992: Swansea West
Party	Candidate	Votes	%	±%
Labour	Alan Williams	23,238	53.0	+4.5
Conservative	Roy Perry	13,760	31.4	−1.6
Liberal Democrats	Martyn Shrewsbury	4,620	10.5	N/A
Plaid Cymru	David Lloyd	1,668	3.8	+1.8
Green	Graham Oubridge	564	1.3	+0.3
Majority		9,478	21.6	+6.1
Turnout		43,850	73.3	−2.7
Registered electors		59,785		
Labour hold		Swing	+3.0	

==== Elections in the 1980s ====
General election 1987: Swansea West
Party	Candidate	Votes	%	±%
Labour	Alan Williams	22,089	48.5	+6.4
Conservative	Nigel Evans	15,027	33.0	−3.6
Liberal	Martyn Ford	7,019	15.4	N/A
Plaid Cymru	Nigel Williams	902	2.0	+0.1
Green	Julie Harman	469	1.0	+0.4
Majority		7,062	15.5	+10.0
Turnout		45,506	76.0	+2.5
Registered electors		59,836		
Labour hold		Swing		

General election 1983: Swansea West
Party	Candidate	Votes	%	±%
Labour	Alan Williams	18,042	42.1	−4.0
Conservative	Julian Lewis	15,692	36.6	−8.7
SDP	Peter Berry	8,036	18.8	N/A
Plaid Cymru	Meirion Pennar	795	1.9	±0.0
Ecology	Graham Oubridge	265	0.6	N/A
Majority		2,350	5.5	+4.7
Turnout		42,830	73.5	−6.1
Registered electors		58,237		
Labour hold		Swing		

==== Elections in the 1970s ====
General election 1979: Swansea West
Party	Candidate	Votes	%	±%
Labour	Alan Williams	24,175	46.1	±0.0
Conservative	David Mercer	23,774	45.3	+9.1
Liberal	Martin J. Ball	3,484	6.7	−7.3
Plaid Cymru	Gruffydd R ap Gwent	1,012	1.9	−1.7
Majority		401	0.8	−9.1
Turnout		52,445	79.6	+4.6
Registered electors		65,872		
Labour hold		Swing		

General election October 1974: Swansea West
Party	Candidate	Votes	%	±%
Labour	Alan Williams	22,565	46.1	+2.7
Conservative	A P Thomas	17,729	36.2	−0.6
Liberal	B E Keal	6,842	14.0	−2.2
Plaid Cymru	Gruffydd R ap Gwent	1,778	3.6	±0.0
Majority		4,836	9.9	+3.3
Turnout		48,914	75.0	−3.8
Registered electors		65,225		
Labour hold		Swing		

General election February 1974: Swansea West
Party	Candidate	Votes	%	±%
Labour	Alan Williams	22,124	43.4	−6.8
Conservative	D R O Lewis	18,786	36.8	−6.8
Liberal	B E Keal	8,248	16.2	N/A
Plaid Cymru	D K Hearne	1,859	3.6	−2.6
Majority		3,338	6.6	±0.0
Turnout		51,017	78.8	+3.1
Registered electors		64,744		
Labour hold		Swing		

General election 1970: Swansea West
Party	Candidate	Votes	%	±%
Labour	Alan Williams	24,622	50.2	−6.2
Conservative	Hugh Rees	21,384	43.6	±0.0
Plaid Cymru	Gruffydd R ap Gwent	3,033	6.2	N/A
Majority		3,238	6.6	−6.2
Turnout		49,039	75.7	−4.7
Registered electors		64,745		
Labour hold		Swing		

==== Elections in the 1960s ====
General election 1966: Swansea West
Party	Candidate	Votes	%	±%
Labour	Alan Williams	26,703	56.4	+8.5
Conservative	Hugh Rees	20,650	43.6	+1.2
Majority		6,053	12.8	+7.3
Turnout		47,353	80.4	−0.9
Registered electors		58,907		
Labour hold		Swing		

General election 1964: Swansea West
Party	Candidate	Votes	%	±%
Labour	Alan Williams	23,019	47.9	−1.7
Conservative	Hugh Rees	20,382	42.4	−8.0
Liberal	Owain Glyn Williams	4,672	9.7	N/A
Majority		2,637	5.5	N/A
Turnout		48,073	81.3	−0.8
Registered electors		59,091		
Labour gain from Conservative		Swing		

==== Elections in the 1950s ====
General election 1959: Swansea West
Party	Candidate	Votes	%	±%
Conservative	Hugh Rees	24,043	50.4	+1.6
Labour	Percy Morris	23,640	49.6	−1.6
Majority		403	0.8	N/A
Turnout		47,683	82.1	+7.0
Registered electors		58,045		
Conservative gain from Labour		Swing		

General election 1955: Swansea West
Party	Candidate	Votes	%	±%
Labour	Percy Morris	22,647	51.2	−1.0
Conservative	Bernard McGlynn	21,626	48.8	+1.0
Majority		1,021	2.4	−2.0
Turnout		44,273	75.1	−9.5
Registered electors		58,923		
Labour hold		Swing		

General election 1951: Swansea West
Party	Candidate	Votes	%	±%
Labour	Percy Morris	26,061	52.2	−1.5
Conservative	Henry Kerby	23,901	47.8	+1.5
Majority		2,160	4.4	−3.0
Turnout		49,962	84.6	+0.9
Registered electors		59,051		
Labour hold		Swing		

General election 1950: Swansea West
Party	Candidate	Votes	%	±%
Labour	Percy Morris	26,273	53.7	−4.3
National Liberal	Lewis Jones	22,608	46.3	+4.3
Majority		3,665	7.4	−8.6
Turnout		48,879	83.7	+10.1
Registered electors		58,362		
Labour hold		Swing		

==== Election in the 1940s ====
General election 1945: Swansea West
Party	Candidate	Votes	%	±%
Labour	Percy Morris	18,098	58.0	+10.9
National Liberal	Lewis Jones	13,089	42.0	−10.9
Majority		5,009	16.0	N/A
Turnout		31,187	73.6	−6.4
Registered electors		42,373		
Labour gain from National Liberal		Swing		

==== Elections in the 1930s ====
General Election 1939–40:

- Another general election was required to take place before the end of 1940. The political parties had been making preparations for an election to take place from 1939 and by the end of this year, the following candidates had been selected;
- Liberal National: Lewis Jones
- Labour: Percy Morris

General election 1935: Swansea West
Party	Candidate	Votes	%	±%
National Liberal	Lewis Jones	18,784	52.9	−5.7
Labour	Percy Morris	16,703	47.1	+5.7
Majority		2,081	5.8	−11.4
Turnout		35,487	80.0	−4.4
Registered electors		44,373		
National Liberal hold		Swing		

General election 1931: Swansea West
Party	Candidate	Votes	%	±%
National Liberal	Lewis Jones	20,603	58.6	+37.8
Labour	Howel Samuel	14,587	41.4	+0.8
Majority		6,016	17.2	N/A
Turnout		35,190	84.4	+2.7
Registered electors		41,680		
National Liberal gain from Labour		Swing		

==== Elections in the 1920s ====
General election 1929: Swansea West
Party	Candidate	Votes	%	±%
Labour	Howel Samuel	13,268	40.6	+7.2
Liberal	Charles Kerr	12,625	38.6	+2.2
Unionist	Alfred William Ernest Wynne	6,794	20.8	−9.4
Majority		643	2.0	N/A
Turnout		32,687	81.7	−5.3
Registered electors		40,021		
Labour gain from Liberal		Swing	+2.5	

General election 1924: Swansea West
Party	Candidate	Votes	%	±%
Liberal	Walter Runciman	10,033	36.4	+2.1
Labour	Howel Samuel	9,188	33.4	−1.4
Unionist	William Hewins	8,324	30.2	−0.7
Majority		845	3.0	N/A
Turnout		27,545	87.0	+1.7
Registered electors		31,674		
Liberal gain from Labour		Swing	+1.7	

General election 1923: Swansea West
Party	Candidate	Votes	%	±%
Labour	Howel Samuel	9,260	34.8	+2.7
Liberal	Alfred Mond	9,145	34.3	−1.2
Unionist	William Hewins	8,238	30.9	−1.5
Majority		115	0.5	N/A
Turnout		26,643	85.3	+1.4
Registered electors		31,237		
Labour gain from Liberal		Swing	+1.9	

General election 1922: Swansea West
Party	Candidate	Votes	%	±%
National Liberal	Alfred Mond	9,278	35.5	−4.5
Unionist	William Hewins	8,476	32.4	−2.0
Labour	Howel Samuel	8,401	32.1	+6.5
Majority		802	3.1	−2.5
Turnout		26,155	83.9	+16.5
Registered electors		31,178		
National Liberal hold		Swing	-1.2	

==== Elections in the 1910s ====
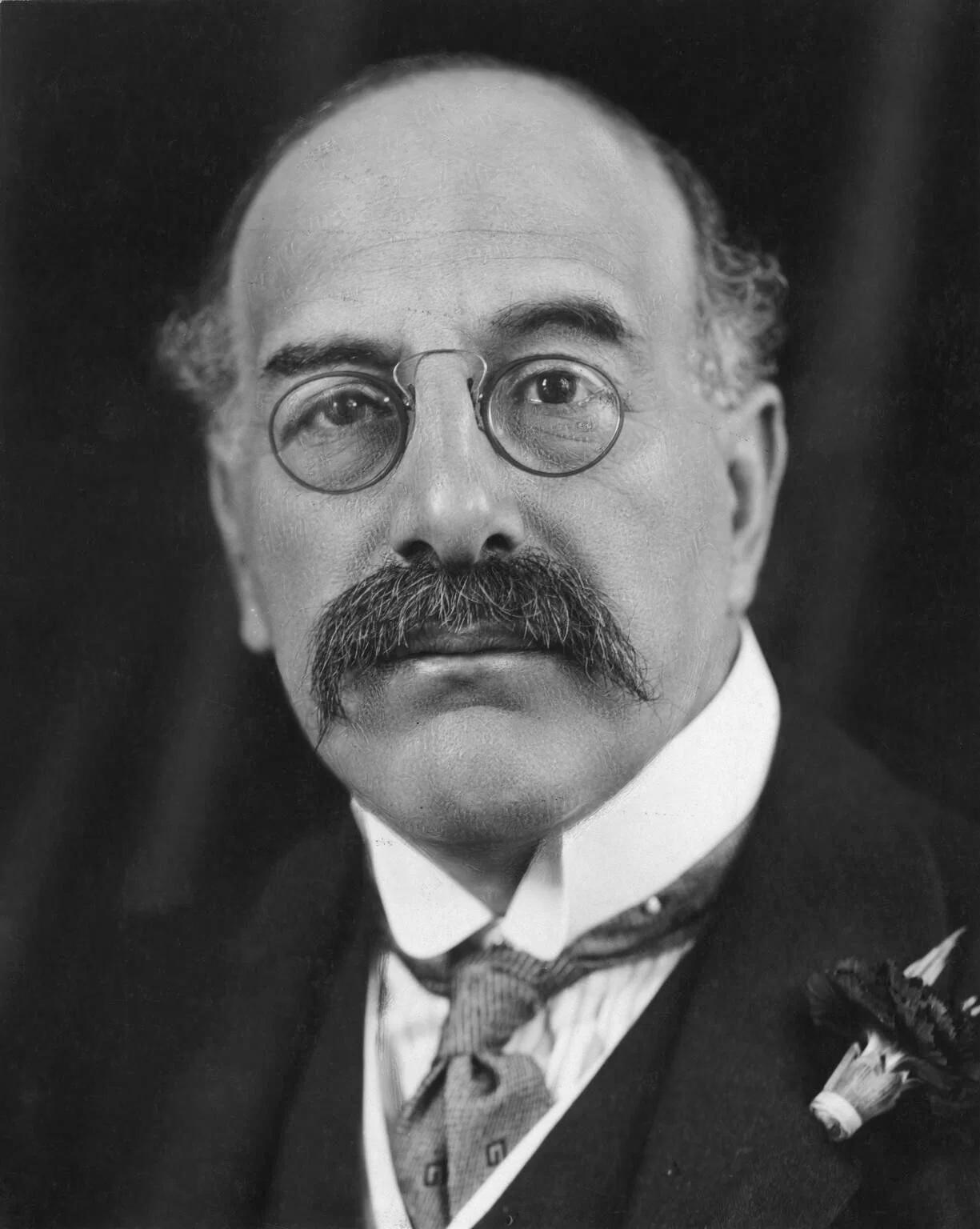
Sir Alfred Mond

General election 1918: Swansea West
Party		Candidate	Votes	%	±%
C	National Liberal	Alfred Mond	8,579	40.0	N/A
	Unionist	David Davies	7,398	34.4	N/A
	Labour	John James Powesland	5,510	25.6	N/A
Majority			1,181	5.6	N/A
Turnout			21,487	67.4	N/A
Registered electors			31,884		
	National Liberal win (new seat)				
C indicates candidate endorsed by the coalition government.

== See also ==
- Swansea West (Senedd constituency)
- List of parliamentary constituencies in West Glamorgan
- List of parliamentary constituencies in Wales

== Notes ==
Parliament of the United Kingdom
Preceded by Linlithgow	Constituency represented by the father of the House; 2005–2010	Succeeded by Louth and Horncastle
