= Neath (UK Parliament constituency) =

UK Parliament constituency (1918–2024)

Coordinates: 51°43′14″N 3°46′11″W

- Former county constituency for the House of Commons
- Boundary of Neath in Wales
- Preserved county: West Glamorgan
- Electorate: 57,823 (December 2010)
- Major settlements: Neath, Pontardawe

1918–2024
- Seats: One
- Created from: Mid Glamorganshire and Gower
- Replaced by: Aberafan Maesteg; Brecon, Radnor and Cwm Tawe; Neath and Swansea East
- Senedd: Neath, South Wales West

Neath (Welsh: Castell-nedd) was a constituency in Wales represented in the House of Commons of the UK Parliament from 1918 to 2024.

The constituency was abolished as part of the 2023 periodic review of Westminster constituencies and under the June 2023 final recommendations of the Boundary Commission for Wales for the 2024 general election. Its wards were split between Aberafan Maesteg, Brecon, Radnor and Cwm Tawe, and Neath and Swansea East.

== History ==
The constituency was located in the preserved county of West Glamorgan, Wales. It consisted of the electoral wards of Aberdulais, Allt-wen, Blaengwrach, Bryn-côch North, Bryn-côch South, Cadoxton, Cimla, Crynant, Cwmllynfell, Dyffryn, Glynneath, Godre'r Graig, Gwaun-Cae-Gurwen, Lower Brynamman, Neath East, Neath North, Neath South, Onllwyn, Pelenna, Pontardawe, Resolven, Rhos, Seven Sisters, Tonna, Trebanos and Ystalyfera.

The Neath constituency was a mixture of both industrial and rural communities, running in a north–south strip across South Wales. It included most of the Neath and Dulais valleys, and some of the Upper Swansea Valley as well. The town of Neath was at its southern end. The constituency contained historical places of both industrial and natural forms. Neath and the surrounding areas were industrialised very early in Britain's history. Copper smelting was already happening here in the late 16th century.

Map of boundaries until 2024

The constituency was heavily mined and the small communities that grew up around these mines were devastated by the collapse of the mining industry in the 1980s. On the edges of many of these communities there are now "Industrial Villages" springing up, helping to replace the jobs lost by the demise of the mining industry, and so helping to keep young people in these communities.

== Members of Parliament ==
Election	Member	Party
1918	John Hugh Edwards	Coalition Liberal
Jan 1922	John Hugh Edwards	National Liberal
Nov 1922	Sir William Jenkins	Labour
1945 by-election	D. J. Williams	Labour
1964	Donald Coleman	Labour
1991 by-election	Peter Hain	Labour
2015	Christina Rees	Labour Co-operative
2022	Christina Rees	Independent
2024	Christina Rees	Labour Co-operative
2024	Constituency abolished	

== Elections ==
=== Elections in the 1910s ===
General election 1918: Neath
Party		Candidate	Votes	%
C	National Liberal	Hugh Edwards	17,818	64.8
	Labour	Herbert Morgan	9,670	35.2
Majority			8,148	29.6
Turnout			27,488	70.6
Registered electors			38,929	
	National Liberal win (new seat)			
C indicates candidate endorsed by the coalition government.

=== Elections in the 1920s ===
General election 1922: Neath
Party	Candidate	Votes	%	±%
Labour	William Jenkins	19,566	59.5	+24.3
National Liberal	Hugh Edwards	13,331	40.5	−24.3
Majority		6,235	19.0	N/A
Turnout		32,897	75.4	+4.8
Registered electors		32,897		
Labour gain from National Liberal		Swing	+24.3	

General election 1923: Neath
Party	Candidate	Votes	%	±%
Labour	William Jenkins	20,764	62.3	+2.8
Liberal	Thomas Elias	12,562	37.7	−2.8
Majority		8,202	24.6	+5.6
Turnout		33,326	73.9	−1.5
Registered electors		33,326		
Labour hold		Swing	+2.8	

General election 1924: Neath
Party	Candidate	Votes	%	±%
Labour	William Jenkins	Unopposed		
Registered electors		46,996		
Labour hold				

General election 1929: Neath
Party	Candidate	Votes	%	±%
Labour	William Jenkins	29,455	60.2	N/A
Liberal	Jack Jones	14,554	29.8	N/A
Unionist	David J. Evans	4,892	10.0	N/A
Majority		14,901	30.4	N/A
Turnout		48,901	82.1	N/A
Registered electors		48,901		
Labour hold		Swing	N/A	

=== Elections in the 1930s ===
General election 1931: Neath
Party	Candidate	Votes	%	±%
Labour	William Jenkins	30,873	64.0	+3.8
Liberal	David G Davies	17,389	36.0	+6.2
Majority		13,484	28.0	−2.4
Turnout		48,262	78.4	−3.7
Registered electors		61,550		
Labour hold		Swing	-1.2	

General election 1935: Neath
Party	Candidate	Votes	%	±%
Labour	William Jenkins	Unopposed		
Registered electors		64,975		
Labour hold				

=== Elections in the 1940s ===
1945 Neath by-election
Party	Candidate	Votes	%	±%
Labour	David James Williams	30,847	79.3	N/A
Plaid Cymru	Wynne Samuel	6,290	16.2	N/A
Revolutionary Communist	Jock Haston	1,781	4.6	N/A
Majority		24,557	63.1	N/A
Turnout		38,918	58.0	N/A
Registered electors		67,083		
Labour hold		Swing	N/A	

General election 1945: Neath
Party	Candidate	Votes	%	±%
Labour	David James Williams	37,957	75.8	N/A
National Liberal	David Bowen	8,466	16.9	N/A
Plaid Cymru	Wynne Samuel	3,659	7.3	N/A
Majority		29,491	58.9	N/A
Turnout		50,082	75.7	N/A
Registered electors		67,083		
Labour hold		Swing		

=== Elections in the 1950s ===
General election 1950: Neath
Party	Candidate	Votes	%	±%
Labour	David James Williams	33,034	73.0	−2.8
Conservative	Jack C. Hope	6,225	13.7	−3.2
Liberal	O Vaughan Jones	4,425	9.8	N/A
Communist	A Thomas	1,584	3.5	N/A
Majority		26,809	59.3	+0.4
Turnout		45,268	87.5	+11.8
Registered electors		51,720		
Labour hold		Swing		

General election 1951: Neath
Party	Candidate	Votes	%	±%
Labour	David James Williams	34,496	76.9	+3.9
Conservative	Geoffrey Jennings	10,367	23.1	+9.4
Majority		24,129	53.8	−5.5
Turnout		44,863	85.9	−1.6
Registered electors		52,203		
Labour hold		Swing		

General election 1955: Neath
Party	Candidate	Votes	%	±%
Labour	David James Williams	30,581	76.4	−0.5
Conservative	Jack C. Hope	9,467	23.6	+0.5
Majority		21,114	52.8	−1.0
Turnout		40,048	77.9	−8.0
Registered electors		51,422		
Labour hold		Swing		

General election 1959: Neath
Party	Candidate	Votes	%	±%
Labour	David James Williams	30,469	71.4	−5.0
Conservative	Daniel Norton Idris Pearce	10,263	24.0	+0.4
Communist	James J. David	1,962	4.6	N/A
Majority		20,206	47.4	−5.4
Turnout		42,694	82.6	+4.7
Registered electors		51,711		
Labour hold		Swing		

=== Elections in the 1960s ===
General election 1964: Neath
Party	Candidate	Votes	%	±%
Labour	Donald Coleman	29,692	73.4	+2.0
Conservative	Mervyn Nelson Scorgie	8,342	20.6	−3.4
Communist	James J. David	2,432	6.0	+1.4
Majority		21,350	52.8	+5.4
Turnout		41,466	80.4	−2.2
Registered electors		50,318		
Labour hold		Swing		

General election 1966: Neath
Party	Candidate	Votes	%	±%
Labour	Donald Coleman	31,183	79.9	+6.5
Conservative	Paul H. Valerio	6,312	16.1	−4.5
Communist	James J. David	1,632	4.2	−1.8
Majority		24,871	63.8	+11.0
Turnout		39,127	78.7	−1.7
Registered electors		49,694		
Labour hold		Swing		

=== Elections in the 1970s ===
General election 1970: Neath
Party	Candidate	Votes	%	±%
Labour	Donald Coleman	28,378	71.4	−8.5
Conservative	David Henry J. Martin-Jones	6,765	17.0	+0.9
Plaid Cymru	Glyn John	4,012	10.1	N/A
Communist	Bert Pearce	579	1.5	−2.7
Majority		21,613	54.4	−9.2
Turnout		38,734	75.3	−3.4
Registered electors		52,744		
Labour hold		Swing		

General election February 1974: Neath
Party	Candidate	Votes	%	±%
Labour	Donald Coleman	25,351	62.2	−9.2
Plaid Cymru	H G Evans	8,758	21.5	+11.4
Conservative	L J Walters	6,616	16.2	−0.8
Majority		16,593	40.7	−13.7
Turnout		40,725	78.5	+3.2
Registered electors		51,887		
Labour hold		Swing		

General election October 1974: Neath
Party	Candidate	Votes	%	±%
Labour	Donald Coleman	25,028	61.4	−0.8
Plaid Cymru	H G Evans	7,305	17.9	−3.6
Conservative	M Harris	4,641	11.4	−4.8
Liberal	D Owen	3,759	9.2	N/A
Majority		17,723	43.5	+2.8
Turnout		40,733	77.9	−0.6
Registered electors		52,257		
Labour hold		Swing		

General election 1979: Neath
Party	Candidate	Votes	%	±%
Labour	Donald Coleman	27,071	64.5	+3.1
Conservative	C Sandy	8,455	20.1	+8.7
Plaid Cymru	Aled Gwyn	6,430	15.3	−2.6
Majority		18,616	44.4	+0.9
Turnout		41,956	81.2	+3.3
Registered electors		51,659		
Labour hold		Swing		

=== Elections in the 1980s ===
General election 1983: Neath
Party	Candidate	Votes	%	±%
Labour	Donald Coleman	22,670	53.6	−10.9
SDP	Keith Davies	9,066	21.4	N/A
Conservative	Richard Buckley	7,350	17.4	−2.7
Plaid Cymru	Ieuan Owen	3,046	7.2	−8.1
Computer Democrat	J Donovan	150	0.3	N/A
Majority		13,604	32.2	−12.2
Turnout		42,282	76.5	−4.7
Registered electors		55,272		
Labour hold		Swing		

General election 1987: Neath
Party	Candidate	Votes	%	±%
Labour	Donald Coleman	27,612	63.4	+9.8
Conservative	Martin Howe	7,034	16.1	−1.3
SDP	John Warman	6,132	14.1	−7.3
Plaid Cymru	Huw John	2,792	6.4	−0.8
Majority		20,578	47.3	+15.1
Turnout		43,570	78.8	+2.3
Registered electors		55,261		
Labour hold		Swing		

=== Elections in the 1990s ===
1991 Neath by-election
Party	Candidate	Votes	%	±%
Labour	Peter Hain	17,962	51.7	−11.7
Plaid Cymru	Dewi Evans	8,132	23.3	+16.9
Conservative	Richard Evans	2,995	8.6	−7.5
Liberal Democrats	David Lloyd	2,000	5.8	−8.3
SDP	John Warman	1,826	5.3	N/A
Local Independent Labour	Rhys Jeffreys	1,253	3.6	N/A
Monster Raving Loony	David Sutch	263	0.8	N/A
Captain Beany of the Bean Party	Barry Kirk	262	0.7	N/A
Majority		9,830	28.4	−18.9
Turnout		34,753	64.0	−14.8
Registered electors		54,482		
Labour hold		Swing	+2.0	

General election 1992: Neath
Party	Candidate	Votes	%	±%
Labour	Peter Hain	30,903	68.0	+4.6
Conservative	David R. Adams	6,928	15.2	−0.9
Plaid Cymru	Dewi R. Evans	5,145	11.3	+4.9
Liberal Democrats	Michael Phillips	2,467	5.4	−8.7
Majority		23,975	52.8	+5.5
Turnout		45,443	80.6	+1.8
Registered electors		56,392		
Labour hold		Swing	+2.8	

General election 1997: Neath
Party	Candidate	Votes	%	±%
Labour	Peter Hain	30,324	73.5	+5.5
Conservative	David M. Evans	3,583	8.7	−6.5
Plaid Cymru	Trefor Jones	3,344	8.1	−3.2
Liberal Democrats	Frank H. Little	2,597	6.3	+0.9
Referendum	Peter A. Morris	975	2.4	N/A
Legalise Cannabis Party	Howard Marks	420	1.0	N/A
Majority		26,741	64.8	+12.0
Turnout		41,243	74.3	−6.3
Registered electors		55,541		
Labour hold		Swing	+6.1	

=== Elections in the 2000s ===
General election 2001: Neath
Party	Candidate	Votes	%	±%
Labour	Peter Hain	21,253	60.7	−12.8
Plaid Cymru	Alun Llewelyn	6,437	18.4	+10.3
Liberal Democrats	Dai Davies	3,335	9.5	+3.2
Conservative	David Devine	3,310	9.5	+0.8
Socialist Alliance	Huw Pudner	483	1.4	N/A
ProLife Alliance	Gerry Brienza	202	0.6	N/A
Majority		14,816	42.3	−22.5
Turnout		35,020	62.5	−11.8
Registered electors		56,001		
Labour hold		Swing	-11.5	

General election 2005: Neath
Party	Candidate	Votes	%	±%
Labour	Peter Hain	18,835	52.6	−8.1
Plaid Cymru	Geraint Owen	6,125	17.1	−1.3
Liberal Democrats	Sheila Waye	5,112	14.3	+4.8
Conservative	Harri Davies	4,136	11.5	+2.0
Green	Susan Jay	658	1.8	N/A
Independent	Gerry Brienza	360	1.0	N/A
Legalise Cannabis	Pat Tabram	334	0.9	N/A
Respect	Heather Falconer	257	0.7	N/A
Majority		12,710	35.5	−6.8
Turnout		35,817	62.2	−0.3
Registered electors		57,278		
Labour hold		Swing	−3.4	

=== Elections in the 2010s ===
General election 2010: Neath
Party	Candidate	Votes	%	±%
Labour	Peter Hain	17,172	46.3	−6.3
Plaid Cymru	Alun Llywelyn	7,397	19.9	+2.8
Liberal Democrats	Frank Little	5,535	14.9	+0.6
Conservative	Emmeline Owens	4,847	13.1	+1.6
BNP	Michael Green	1,342	3.6	N/A
UKIP	James Bevan	829	2.2	N/A
Rejected ballots		67		
Majority		9,775	26.4	−9.1
Turnout		37,122	64.9	+2.7
Registered electors		57,295		
Labour hold		Swing	−4.6	

Of the 67 rejected ballots:

- 44 were either unmarked or it was uncertain who the vote was for.
- 22 voted for more than one candidate.
- 1 had writing or mark by which the voter could be identified.

General election 2015: Neath
Party	Candidate	Votes	%	±%
Labour Co-op	Christina Rees	16,270	43.8	−2.5
Plaid Cymru	Daniel Thomas	6,722	18.1	−1.8
UKIP	Richard Pritchard	6,094	16.4	+14.2
Conservative	Ed Hastie	5,691	15.3	+2.2
Green	Catrin Brock	1,185	3.2	N/A
Liberal Democrats	Clare Bentley	1,173	3.2	−11.7
Rejected ballots		114		
Majority		9,548	25.7	−0.7
Turnout		37,135	66.2	+1.3
Registered electors		56,097		
Labour Co-op hold		Swing	−0.3	

Of the 114 rejected ballots:

- 81 were either unmarked or it was uncertain who the vote was for.
- 33 voted for more than one candidate.

General election 2017: Neath
Party	Candidate	Votes	%	±%
Labour Co-op	Christina Rees	21,713	56.7	+12.9
Conservative	Orla Lowe	9,082	23.7	+8.4
Plaid Cymru	Daniel Williams	5,339	13.9	−4.2
UKIP	Richard Pritchard	1,419	3.7	−12.7
Liberal Democrats	Frank Little	732	1.9	−1.3
Rejected ballots		83		
Majority		12,631	33.0	+7.3
Turnout		38,285	68.5	+1.3
Registered electors		55,862		
Labour Co-op hold		Swing	+2.2	

Of the 83 rejected ballots:

- 57 were either unmarked or it was uncertain who the vote was for.
- 22 voted for more than one candidate.
- 3 had writing or mark by which the voter could be identified.
- 1 had want of official mark.

General election 2019: Neath
Party	Candidate	Votes	%	±%
Labour Co-op	Christina Rees	15,920	43.3	−13.4
Conservative	Jon Burns	10,283	28.0	+4.3
Plaid Cymru	Daniel Williams	4,495	12.2	−1.7
Brexit Party	Simon Briscoe	3,184	8.7	N/A
Liberal Democrats	Andrew Kingston-Jones	1,485	4.0	+2.1
Green	Megan Lloyd	728	2.0	N/A
Independent	Philip Rogers	594	1.6	N/A
SDP	Carl Williams	67	0.2	N/A
Rejected ballots		107		
Majority		5,637	15.3	−17.7
Turnout		36,756	65.2	−3.3
Registered electors		56,416		
Labour Co-op hold		Swing	−8.8	

Of the 107 rejected ballots:

- 84 were either unmarked or it was uncertain who the vote was for.
- 23 voted for more than one candidate.

== See also ==
- Neath (Senedd constituency)
- List of parliamentary constituencies in West Glamorgan
- List of parliamentary constituencies in Wales
