= Olwen Williams =

Welsh clinician in sexual health

- Education: University of Liverpool
- Occupation: Consultant physician in genitourinary/HIV Medicine
- Organization(s): Health Education and Improvement Wales, Associate Director of Clinical Leadership
- Board member of: Royal College of Physicians, Vice President for Wales; Academy of Royal Colleges in Wales, Chair; Medical Women's Association, Vice President; British Association for Sexual Health and HIV - President 2018–2020
- Awards: Welsh Woman of the Year (2000)
- Honours: OBE (2005)

Olwen Williams OBE FRCP FLSW is a Consultant Physician in Genitourinary/HIV Medicine based at Betsi Cadwaladr University Health Board, North Wales. She was appointed an OBE for services to medicine in Wales in 2005. and Welsh Woman of the Year in 2000.

== Early life and education ==
Brought up in North Wales and a Welsh speaker, she was educated at Ysgol Dyffryn Nantlle and the University of Liverpool.

== Career ==
Olwen Williams is currently Associate Director of Clinical Leadership at Health Education and Improvement Wales, she is chair of the Academy of Royal Colleges in Wales. As Royal College of Physicians Vice President for Wales, she promoted the need to increase the medical workforce and staff wellbeing. She was member of the Royal College of Physicians' Committee for Health Inequalities. She also has held the positions of Vice-President of the Medical Women's Federation (2016–2018), Divisional Vice-President for the NSPCC in Wales, Trustee of the National AIDS Trust, Honorary Fellow and Lay Member of Council of Bangor University

Williams was clinical lead for the Royal College of Physicians' Future Hospitals project development site at Betsi Cadwaladr University Health Board, a project using telemedicine to improve access to clinical services for the elderly and frail in rural Wales through the virtual clinic C@rtref. She has also acted as an advisor to the Welsh Government and was elected a Fellow of the Learned Society of Wales in 2017 She has served at board level and as president of the British Association for Sexual Health and HIV (BASHH) 2018–2020.

In 2000, Williams was named Welsh Woman of the Year and, in 2005, she was awarded an OBE for services to medicine in Wales.
