= Adelaine Hain =

South African anti-apartheid activist (1927–2019)

Adelaine "Ad" Florence Hain (born Stocks; 16 February 1927 – 8 September 2019) was a South African anti-apartheid activist. She was a member of the South African Liberal Party and was active in Pretoria. After she and her family left South Africa, she continued to agitate in London. Hain is the mother of British politician Peter Hain, and she worked for him part-time until she was 82.

== Biography ==
Hain was born on 16 February 1927 in Port Alfred. She grew up in Mentone, near the Kowie River. Hain attended Queen Alexandra School and later went to Victoria Girls' High School as a boarder. She had two left-wing teachers who introduced her to the work of Paul Robeson. After graduating high school, she began to work on her father's news sheet, the Kowie Announcer. Later, she worked in Pretoria where she met her husband, Walter Hain. The couple married on 1 September 1948. Together, the couple became more radicalized over time.

After her husband finished his degree in architecture, the couple moved several times. The couple both joined the South African Liberal Party in 1954. In 1958, they came back to Pretoria, where they became very involved in the Pretoria chapter of the Liberal Party. The couple held Liberal party meetings with people of all backgrounds at their home in Hatfield. Hain would sign black people's passbooks "to keep their owners from being arrested." She also sent food to the families of political prisoners and tried to help the prisoners themselves. Hain was able to pass messages through methods such as by hiding notes inside onion layers or by restitching a shirt.

After the Sharpeville massacre in 1960, the family was under increasing surveillance and harassment by the South African police. Their house was raided, sometimes during the night with the family in residence and they were followed by police vehicles when they drove. The phone was also tapped. Some family members in South Africa disavowed their relationship to the Hains.

In 1961, both Hain and her husband were arrested and detained for "illegal political activity." During the arrest, Hain chewed up the political paper draft that would have incriminated them. The couple were released in 12 days due to a "lack of evidence." During Nelson Mandela's trial in 1963, she was there, and the two would greet one another in the courtroom with a clenched fist. In September of that year, she was banned. Her banning order meant that she could not "attend gatherings," which included even her daughter's 10th birthday party. Despite being banned, Hain continued to fight apartheid, helping to deliver messages to political prisoners and helping one person flee South Africa.

Hain and her family left South Africa in 1966 and settled in London. The family continued to protest in London, targeting the South African embassy. In London, Hain once found a letter bomb sent by the South African security services in her home.

When her son, Peter Hain, was elected as a member of parliament in 1991, Hain began to work part-time for him at the House of Commons. She continued to work there until she was 82. In 2009, Hain moved to Neath, where her son, Peter, was the local MP. Her husband, Walter, died in 2016. Hain died on 8 September 2019. South African president, Cyril Ramaphosa expressed his condolences to the family at her death. He said of Hain, "She deserves our respect and gratitude for mobilising her own family as much as she mobilised communities to dismantle apartheid."
