= Judith Elizabeth Hall =

Welsh professor of anaesthetics, intensive care and pain medicine

Judith Elizabeth Hall OBE FLSW is Professor of Anaesthetics, Intensive Care and Pain Medicine at Cardiff University. She leads the Phoenix Project, a Cardiff University partnership with the University of Namibia that seeks to reduce poverty, promote health and support sustainable environmental development.

== Career ==
Professor Hall is a consultant anaesthetist at Cardiff and Vale University Health Board, Director of MediWales, a life science network for Wales, and a council member for the Royal College of Anaesthetists.

Hall is the founder of the charity Mothers of Africa and through her charity work is contributing to the improvement of maternal mortality in sub-Saharan Africa.

In 2006 she developed the first medical simulation suite in Cardiff University's School of Medicine.

In 2011 Hall developed a device to prevent potentially fatal 'wrong-route' injections of drugs into wrong parts of the body, making use of colour-coded and shaped connectors that are designed to be used in only one area.

Her research degree was awarded by the University of Wales, College of Medicine.

=== Phoenix Project ===
Professor Hall leads Cardiff University's Phoenix Project in collaboration with the University of Namibia. This engagement project works with communities in Cardiff and beyond, particularly in Namibia, on projects in health, education and poverty reduction. It has 40 sub-projects, including doctor and nurse education, developing the software sector in Namibia, work around the value of culture and languages in young people, and enabling police and ambulance services to save lives in road traffic collisions.

In October 2018 Hall and Dr Brian Jenkins will deliver specialist nurse training in Namibia which is unavailable across much of southern Africa, including post-operative pain management, interpreting blood results, and monitoring the respiratory system. It is the first specialist nurse training outside midwifery in Namibia. Hall was personally asked to set up the specialist nurse training by Namibia's deputy minister of health and social services Hon Julieta Kavetuna.

== Honours and awards ==
Hall was a Welsh Woman of the Year 2008–9. In 2011 Hall was awarded the MediWales NHS Award for Innovation working with Industry, MediWales Industry Award for Innovation, Insider Wales Innovation Wales Award, and a Personal Recognition Award for Contribution to Patient Safety from the Welsh Government.

In 2013 Hall was awarded an OBE in the New Year Honours List, for services to academic anaesthesia and charitable services in Africa.

She is Project Lead on the Phoenix Project, which won International Collaboration of the Year in the Times Higher Education Awards in 2017. The project won a St David Award in 2018, which recognises exceptional achievements of people and groups in Wales. The award was presented by First Minister Carwyn Jones at the Senedd in Cardiff.

In July 2018 Hall was awarded an Honorary Fellowship by the University of Wales Trinity Saint David, at a graduation ceremony in Brangwyn Hall in Swansea, Wales.

In 2022, Hall was elected a Fellow of the Learned Society of Wales.
