= Peter Hain =

British politician (born 1950)

The Right Honourable The Lord Hain PC
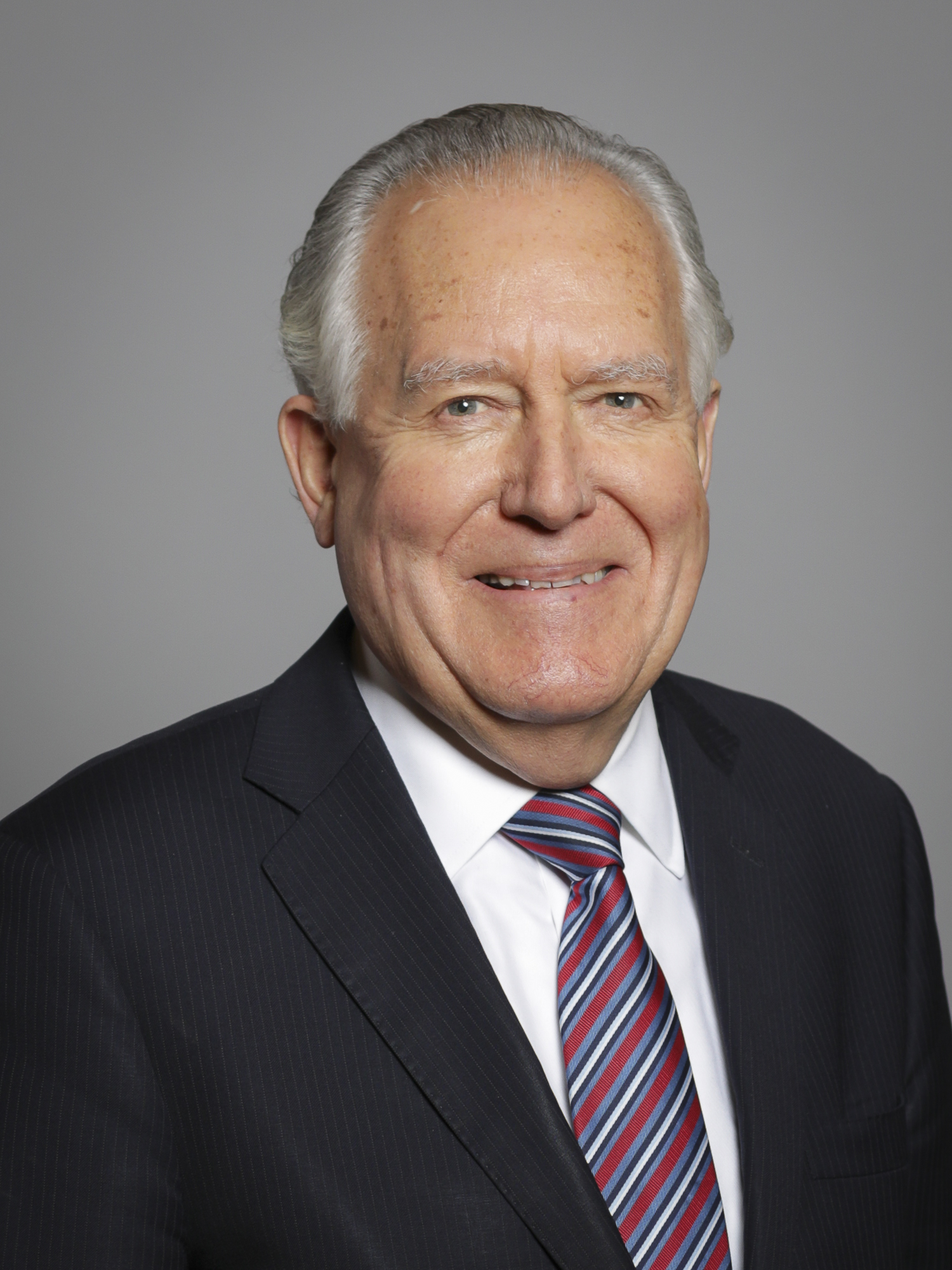
- Official portrait, 2019

Secretary of State for Wales
- In office 5 June 2009 – 11 May 2010
- Prime Minister: Gordon Brown
- Preceded by: Paul Murphy
- Succeeded by: Cheryl Gillan
- In office 24 October 2002 – 24 January 2008
- Prime Minister: Tony Blair; Gordon Brown
- Preceded by: Paul Murphy
- Succeeded by: Paul Murphy

Secretary of State for Work and Pensions
- In office 28 June 2007 – 24 January 2008
- Prime Minister: Gordon Brown
- Preceded by: John Hutton
- Succeeded by: James Purnell

Secretary of State for Northern Ireland
- In office 6 May 2005 – 28 June 2007
- Prime Minister: Tony Blair
- Preceded by: Paul Murphy
- Succeeded by: Shaun Woodward

First Minister of Northern Ireland
- as Secretary of State for Northern Ireland
- In office 6 May 2005 – 8 May 2007
- Monarch: Elizabeth II
- Prime Minister: Tony Blair
- Preceded by: Paul Murphy
- Succeeded by: Ian Paisley (FM); Martin McGuinness (dFM)

Leader of the House of Commons
- In office 11 June 2003 – 6 May 2005
- Prime Minister: Tony Blair
- Preceded by: John Reid
- Succeeded by: Geoff Hoon

Lord Keeper of the Privy Seal
- In office 13 June 2003 – 6 May 2005
- Prime Minister: Tony Blair
- Preceded by: The Lord Williams of Mostyn
- Succeeded by: Geoff Hoon
Junior ministerial offices
Minister of State for Europe
In office 11 June 2001 – 24 October 2002
| Prime Minister | Tony Blair |
| Preceded by | Keith Vaz |
| Succeeded by | Denis MacShane |
Minister of State for Energy and Competitiveness in Europe
In office 24 January 2001 – 11 June 2001
| Prime Minister | Tony Blair |
| Preceded by | Helen Liddell |
| Succeeded by | Brian Wilson |
Minister of State for Africa, the Middle East and South Asia
In office 28 July 1999 – 24 January 2001
| Prime Minister | Tony Blair |
| Preceded by | Geoff Hoon |
| Succeeded by | Brian Wilson |
Parliamentary Under-Secretary of State for Wales
In office 2 May 1997 – 28 July 1999
| Prime Minister | Tony Blair |
| Preceded by | Gwilym Jones; Jonathan Evans |
| Succeeded by | David Hanson |
Further offices held
Shadow Secretary of State for Wales
In office 11 May 2010 – 15 May 2012
| Leader | Harriet Harman (acting); Ed Miliband |
| Preceded by | Cheryl Gillan |
| Succeeded by | Owen Smith |
Member of the House of Lords
Lord Temporal
Life peerage 22 October 2015
Member of Parliament for Neath
In office 4 April 1991 – 30 March 2015
| Preceded by | Donald Coleman |
| Succeeded by | Christina Rees |

Personal details
- Born: 16 February 1950 (age 76) Nairobi, British Kenya
- Party: Labour (1977–present)
- Other political affiliations: Anti-Nazi League (1977–1981); Liberal (1968–1977)
- Spouses: Patricia Western (m. 1975; div. 2002); Elizabeth Haywood (m. 2003)
- Children: 2
- Parent(s): Walter Vannet Hain; Adelaine Stocks
- Education: Queen Mary College, University of London; University of Sussex
- Website: peterhain.com parliament.lordhain.uk

Peter Gerald Hain, Baron Hain, PC (born 16 February 1950) is a British politician who served as Secretary of State for Northern Ireland from 2005 to 2007, Secretary of State for Work and Pensions from 2007 to 2008 and twice as Secretary of State for Wales from 2002 to 2008 and from 2009 to 2010. A member of the Labour Party, he was Member of Parliament (MP) for Neath between 1991 and 2015.

Born in Kenya Colony to South African parents, Hain came to the United Kingdom from South Africa as a teenager and was a noted anti-fascist and anti-apartheid campaigner in the 1970s, and was convicted of criminal conspiracy for leading direct action events. Elected to Parliament at a 1991 by-election, he initially served in Tony Blair's government as a junior minister in the Wales Office, Foreign Office and Department of Trade and Industry. Promoted to the Cabinet as Welsh Secretary in 2002, he served concurrently as Leader of the House of Commons from 2003 to 2005 and Northern Ireland Secretary from 2005 to 2007.

Hain stood for the deputy leadership of the Labour Party in the 2007 deputy leadership election, coming fifth out of six candidates. He was promoted to Work and Pensions Secretary by new leader Gordon Brown, while remaining Welsh Secretary. His failure to declare donations during the deputy leadership contest led to his resignation from both roles in 2008. He later returned to the Cabinet from 2009 to 2010 as Welsh Secretary.

After Labour was defeated at the 2010 general election, Hain was Shadow Welsh Secretary in the Miliband shadow cabinet from 2010 until 2012, when he announced his retirement from frontline politics. In June 2014 he announced that he would stand down as MP for Neath at the 2015 general election and was subsequently nominated for a life peerage in the 2015 Dissolution Honours.

== Early life ==
Whilst his father was working temporarily there, Hain was born in Nairobi in what was then Kenya Colony, but he moved to the Union of South Africa when his parents returned about a year later. His South African parents, Walter Vannet Hain and Adelaine Hain (née Stocks), were anti-apartheid activists in the Liberal Party of South Africa, for which they were made "banned persons", briefly imprisoned, and prevented from working.

When Hain was 10, he was awoken in the early hours by police officers searching his bedroom for 'incriminating documents'. Aged 11 he was again awoken to be told his parents had been imprisoned for leafleting in support of Nelson Mandela's campaign; they were released without charge after 14 days' detention. At 15, Hain spoke at the funeral of John Frederick Harris, an anti-apartheid activist who was hanged for murder for the bombing of the Johannesburg main railway station, injuring 23 people and killing one. Hain and his parents strongly opposed the bombing but stood by Harris and his wife Ann and baby son David, who were family friends. As a result of security police harassment, Hain's father was unable to continue his work as an architect, and the family, deprived of an income, was forced to leave for the United Kingdom in 1966.

=== Life in South Africa and London ===
Hain was educated in South Africa at Hatfield Primary School, Pretoria Boys High School, and in London at Emanuel School. At Queen Mary College, University of London, he acquired a first class bachelor's degree in economics and political science in 1973, and at the University of Sussex he obtained an MPhil. After university, Hain worked as a researcher for the Union of Communication Workers from September 1976, later rising to become their head of research. During this time, Hain wrote several articles that harshly criticised Israel, including a 1976 piece in The Guardian newspaper where he stated that Israel needed to be dismantled to make way for a secular, democratic Palestinian state.

==== Anti-apartheid activism ====
He joined the British Anti-Apartheid Movement aged 17 in 1967. When Hain was 19, he became chairman of the Stop The '70 Tour campaign which disrupted tours by the South African rugby union and cricket teams in 1969 and 1970. In 1971, director John Goldschmidt produced a film for Granada's World in Action programme featuring Hain debating "Apartheid in South Africa" at the Oxford Union. The film was transmitted on the ITV network. In 1972 a private prosecution resulted in his conviction for criminal conspiracy at the Old Bailey for which he was fined £200. The prosecution was funded largely from apartheid-supporting whites in South Africa due to his campaign against white-only South African sports tours. He was acquitted of three other conspiracy counts after defending himself in the four-week trial described in the book edited by Derek Humphry, Cricket Conspiracy (1975, ISBN 0-901108-40-5).

In 1972, the South African Security Services were suspected of sending him a letter bomb that failed to explode because of faulty wiring. In 1976 Hain was tried for, and acquitted of, a 1975 bank theft, having been framed by the South African Bureau of State Security (BOSS) according to his 1987 book, A Putney Plot.

==== Joining the Liberal and Labour Parties ====
In 1968, Hain joined the Liberal Party. He was elected chairperson in 1971 and president of the Young Liberals in 1975, but in 1977 switched to Labour. The same year, he was a founder of the Anti-Nazi League.

==== Homosexual equality ====
In the 1970s, Hain was also honorary vice-president of the Campaign for Homosexual Equality when he clashed with lobbying interests from the Paedophile Information Exchange (PIE).

== Member of Parliament ==
Hain contested Putney in the 1983 and 1987 general elections but was defeated on both occasions by Conservative David Mellor.

Having already been selected as Labour's candidate for the Neath constituency at the 1992 general election, Hain was elected to the House of Commons at the by-election in April 1991 that followed the death of the sitting member, Donald Coleman, who had announced his intention to retire at the next election. In 1995 he became a Labour whip and in 1996 became a shadow employment minister.

=== In government ===
Following Labour's victory in the 1997 general election Hain joined the government, first at the Welsh Office 1997–1999, then as minister of state at the Foreign and Commonwealth Office from 1999 to 2001 with responsibility for Africa, the Middle East and South Asia.

In November 1999, as Africa minister, Hain met Robert Mugabe in London; Mugabe told him "I know you are not one of them, Peter; you are one of us," But the following day, following an attempt by Gay Rights campaigner Peter Tatchell to carry out a citizen's arrest on Mugabe, Mugabe accused Hain of being Tatchell's "wife". In October 2000 he set up a war avoidance team to carry messages back and forth between himself and the then-Minister of Foreign Affairs in Iraq, Tariq Aziz (a matter then confidential, which has since been put on public record in an interview with Hain by the Today programme). Team members who travelled repeatedly to Iraq on Hain's behalf included William Morris, Burhan Chalabi (an Iraqi-born British businessman), and Nasser al-Khalifa (the then-Qatari Ambassador to the UK). He voted for the invasion of Iraq in 2003, later calling it a "fringe issue" compared to other government priorities. However he subsequently described the Iraq invasion as a 'disaster' and said 'I believed the evidence shown me on weapons of mass destruction later discovered to be entirely false.'

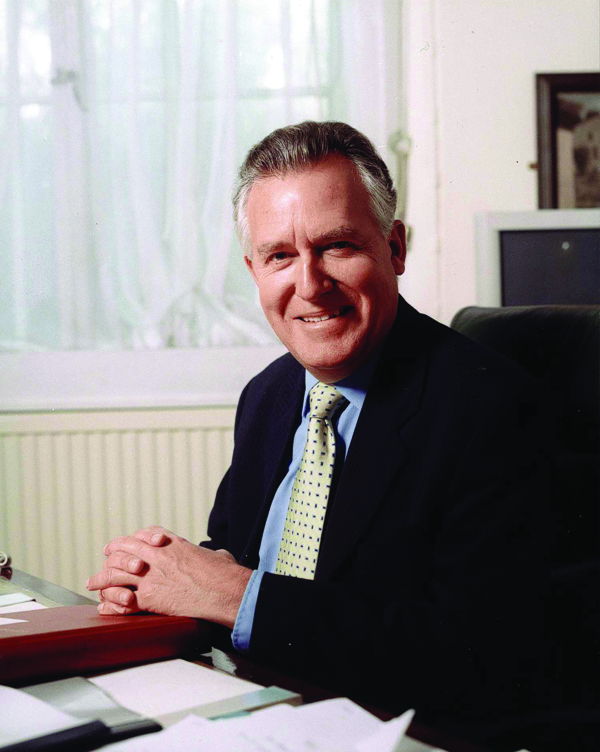
Hain during his time in office

In 2001, Hain moved briefly to the Department of Trade and Industry before returning to the Foreign Office as Minister for Europe, being sworn into the Privy Council the same year. He was vocal in advocating joint sovereignty of Gibraltar with Spain.

In October 2002, Hain joined the Cabinet as Secretary of State for Wales, but continued to represent the UK at the Convention on the Future of Europe. In June 2003 he was made Leader of the House of Commons and Lord Privy Seal in a cabinet reshuffle, but retained the Wales portfolio. In November 2004 he caused controversy among his political rivals when he claimed that "If we are tough on crime and on terrorism, as Labour is, then I think Britain will be safer under Labour".

On 6 May 2005, following the 2005 general election, Hain was appointed as Secretary of State for Northern Ireland by Prime Minister Tony Blair, also retaining his Welsh position. He was responsible for negotiating the settlement which brought former enemies Sinn Féin and the Democratic Unionist Party into a power-sharing Northern Irish government from May 2007. Although previously a supporter of Irish unity, he has since retreated from this position. On 28 June 2007, he was appointed as Secretary of State for Work and Pensions in addition to retaining responsibility for Wales. He was a proponent of the "tough love" measures designed to force claimants, including the sick and disabled, back to work. He saw it as an anti-poverty, full-employment agenda. He resigned from his post when the issue of donations made to his campaign funds were referred to the police.

Hain set a level of compensation for the taxpayer funded Financial Assistance Scheme similar to that of the Industry funded Pension Protection Fund (PPF) for those whose schemes had collapsed before the establishment of the PPF. Referring to the long running Pensions Action Group campaign and speaking on the BBC Radio 4 Moneybox programme on the day compensation was announced, pensions expert Ros Altmann, credited Hain and Mike O'Brien with "having been very different to deal with than their predecessors and..willing and eager to engage and find a way to sort this out."

=== Deputy leadership bid ===
On 12 September 2006, Hain announced his candidacy for the position of Deputy Leader of the Labour Party. In January 2007, Hain gave an interview to the New Statesman in which he made his pitch for the Deputy Leadership and referred to the Bush administration as "the most right-wing American administration, if not ever, then in living memory" and argued that "the neo-con agenda for America has been rejected by the people and I hope that will be the case for the future". Hain was eliminated in the second round of the Deputy Leadership election, coming fifth out of the six candidates, with Harriet Harman being the successful candidate.

=== Resignation following Labour party deputy leadership donations scandal ===
In January 2008, The Guardian reported that Hain had failed to declare some 20 donations worth a total of over £100,000 during his deputy leadership campaign and would be investigated by the Electoral commission. Hain admitted "deeply regrettable administrative failings" but faced questioning on whether the oversight was due to changes in campaign manager possibly causing "chaos" during the campaign or the desire of some donors to remain private. Phil Taylor, the first campaign manager, said that Hain insisted on knowing who had donated and that it was legal. His campaign only reported a separate £82,000 of donations and The Guardian believes he stopped taking a personal interest in funding once the campaign ended though there was no evidence that he deliberately broke the law.

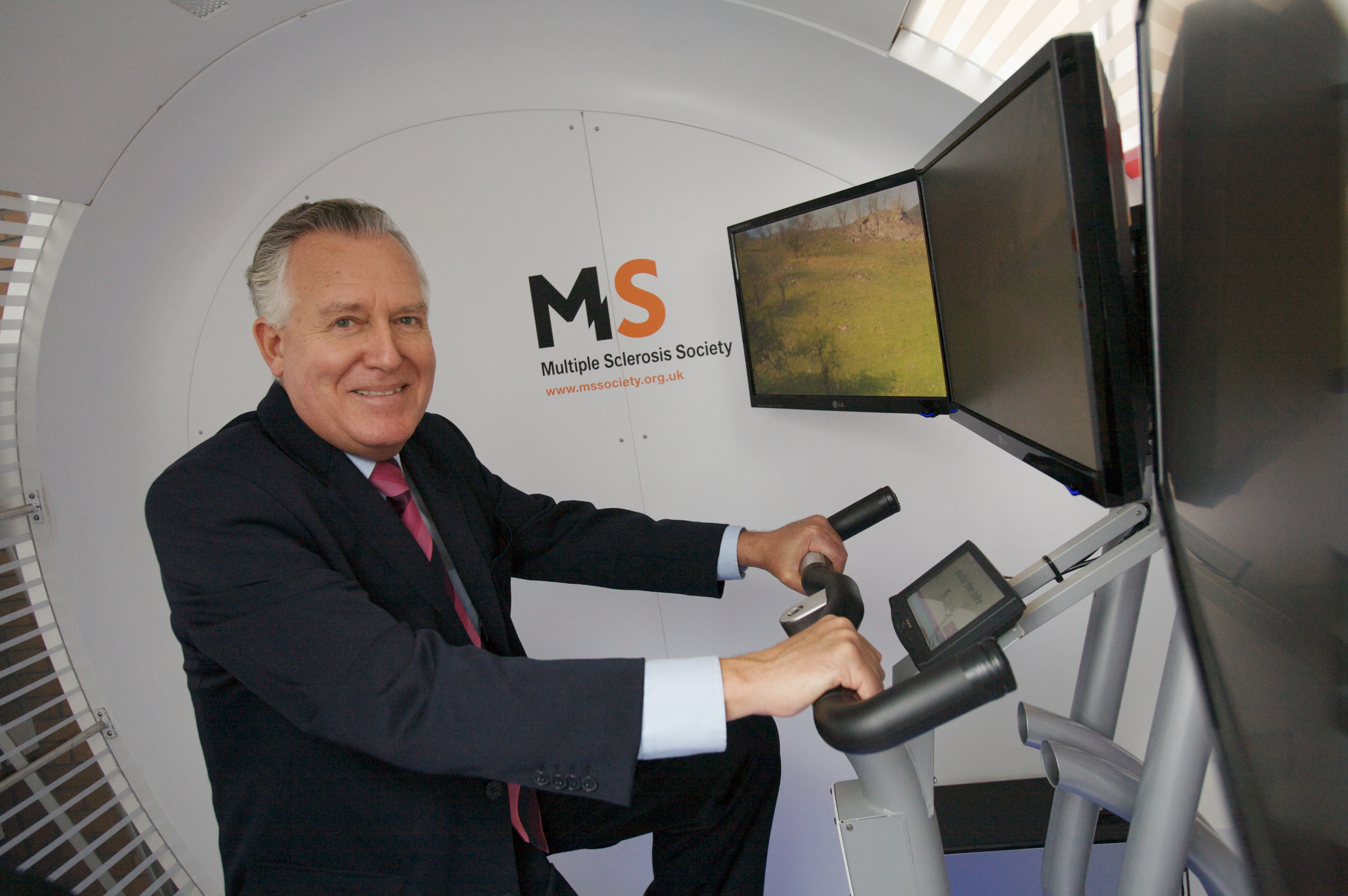
Hain during Labour Party conference 2009

Taylor's successor was Steve Morgan, and it later emerged that four donations were channelled through a non-operating think tank, the Progressive Policies Forum (PPF) which may be connected with Morgan, who was named as a donor. On 12 January, Hain released a statement saying that he wanted to get on with his job and it was absurd to think he had deliberately hidden anything. John Underwood, a trustee of the PPF, said that the donations and loans were "entirely permissible", though Hain said he would pay back a £25,000 interest-free loan.

On 24 January 2008, Hain resigned from several posts, including his position as Work and Pensions secretary, after the Electoral Commission referred the failure to report donations to Metropolitan Police. He cited a desire to "clear his name" as the reason for his resignation. Hain was the first person to resign from Gordon Brown's cabinet. He was replaced as Secretary of State for Wales by Paul Murphy, and as Secretary for Work and Pensions by James Purnell in a forced cabinet reshuffle.

Hain's campaign had properly declared some £100,000 of donations but failed to declare £103,156 of donations, contrary to electoral law. On 3 July 2008, the Metropolitan Police announced that they had referred Hain's case to the Crown Prosecution Service. On 5 December 2008 the CPS announced that Hain would not be charged because Hain was not responsible and did not control the members' association Hain4Labour that funded his campaign. He returned to the Cabinet as Secretary of State for Wales the following year.

=== In opposition ===
Hain was re-appointed Shadow Welsh Secretary in Ed Miliband's Shadow Cabinet following Miliband's election as leader in 2010. He was a supporter of the unsuccessful Alternative Vote system in the May 2011 referendum. In May 2012, he announced his retirement from front-line politics.

==== Attempted prosecution for contempt of court ====
On 27 March 2012, the Attorney General for Northern Ireland, John Larkin QC obtained leave from Lord Justice Higgins to bring proceedings against Hain and "Biteback Publishing" for contempt of court. Although Hain's book Outside In had already been passed by the Cabinet Office and the Northern Ireland Office prior to publication, the alleged contempt related to statements about Lord Justice Girvan's disposal of an application for judicial review while Hain was Secretary of State.

Hain's remarks had previously been strongly criticised by the Lord Chief Justice of Northern Ireland, Declan Morgan though the decision to charge Hain with "scandalising the court", using a law already obsolete in 1899 drew ridicule in Westminster and strong criticism from senior DUP ministers. According to the Attorney General, Hain's statements prejudiced the administration of justice and amounted to an unjustifiable attack on the judiciary. At a preliminary hearing before a Divisional Court of the Queen's Bench Division of the High Court of Justice on 24 April 2012, Hain's counsel suggested that the action had no basis in common law and was contrary to the European Convention on Human Rights. The trial was intended to take place on 19 June 2012 but the case was dropped on 17 May 2012 after Hain agreed to clarify comments to show he didn't question Girvan's motives or his handling of the judicial review.

== House of Lords ==
In June 2014, Hain announced he would stand down as the MP for Neath at the 2015 general election. He was nominated for a life peerage in the 2015 Dissolution Honours. Writing in the Guardian, he subsequently outlined his views on House of Lords reform. He was created a life peer taking the title Baron Hain, of Neath in the County of West Glamorgan, on 22 October 2015. He is a member of Labour Friends of Israel. He remains a prominent supporter of Unite Against Fascism today and is vice-president of Action for Southern Africa.

On 25 October 2018, Hain used parliamentary privilege in the House of Lords to name Philip Green as the businessman accused of sexual and racial harassment by The Daily Telegraph. A legal injunction had prevented the newspaper from naming him. Following Hain's statement, the accusations made against Green were widely published in the media. Hain is a remunerated adviser to the law firm acting for the alleged victims, and Green subsequently announced that, due to this conflict of interest, he would lodge a complaint with the House of Lords.

Hain is a member of the Steering Committee of the Constitution Reform Group (CRG), a cross-party organisation chaired by Robert Gascoyne-Cecil, 7th Marquess of Salisbury, which seeks a new constitutional settlement in the UK by way of a new Act of Union. The Constitution Reform Group's new Act of Union Bill was introduced as a Private member's bill by Lord Lisvane in the House of Lords on 9 October 2018, when it received a formal first reading. The Bill was described by the BBC as "one to watch" in that session of Parliament.

In December 2025, Hain appeared on the Off the Shelf podcast.

== Political thought ==
Hain identifies as a libertarian socialist and has written in support of libertarian socialist arguments, arguing that the traditional revolutionary-reformist axis obscures an important statist-libertarian axis, such that as well as statist socialism with "Marxist–Leninists at the revolutionary end [and] social democrats at the reformist end", there is the libertarian "bottom-up vision of socialism, with anarchists at the revolutionary end and democratic socialists [such as himself] at its reformist end". Hain has argued for "encouraging industrial democracy. This is one of the keys to the high productivity, investment and wealth needed for economic success, by helping generate greater team working and commitment which is such an important requirement of complex modern production systems."

== Business and charity interests ==
The renewed campaign for construction of the Severn Barrage by Hafren Power was led by Hain in 2012, until Hafren Power wound up in 2014.

In May 2013 Hain joined Amara Mining as non-executive director until its takeover by Perseus Mining in May 2016. On 28 October 2015, Hain was appointed to the Board of AIM listed fertiliser company, African Potash, as non-executive Director, but resigned in November 2017. He is Global and Governmental Adviser to Gordon Dadds PLC.

Since 2014 Hain has been chair of Trustees of the Donald Woods Foundation, a charity working in the poverty stricken Transkei, Eastern Cape, near Nelson Mandela's homeland. He is also a Trustee of the Listen Charity. In 2016-17 he chaired the OR Tambo Centenary Organising Committee.

From 2014 Hain has been Visiting Professor at the University of South Wales. In September 2016 he was appointed Visiting Professor at Witwatersrand University Business School and in September 2017 was appointed Visiting Fellow at Henley Business School.

== Alternative medicine ==
Hain is a member of the Advisory Council for the College of Medicine, an alternative medicine lobbying organisation set up following the disbanding of King Charles III, then Prince of Wales's Foundation for Integrated Health in the wake of a fraud investigation. Describing its mission as "to take forward the vision of HRH the Prince of Wales" and originally called "The College of Integrated Health", several commentators, writing in The Guardian, The British Medical Journal and in the blogosphere, say this organisation is simply a re-branding of the Foundation. It continues to act as an alternative medicine lobby group. The college has been referred to as "Hamlet without the Prince".

== Personal life ==
Hain lives in Resolven in the Neath Valley. He married his first wife Patricia Western in 1975, and they have two sons. In June 2003, he married his second wife, Welsh businesswoman, Elizabeth Haywood, in Neath Register Office.

== Publications ==
- Peter Hain (1971). Don't Play with Apartheid: Background to the Stop the Seventy Tour Campaign. Allen & Unwin. ISBN 978-0043010310.
- Radical Liberalism and Youth Politics, Peter Hain, 1973, Liberal Publications Department ISBN 0-900520-36-1
- Radical Regeneration Peter Hain, 1975, Quartet Books ISBN 0-7043-1231-X
- Peter Hain, ed. (1976). Community Politics. Calder Publications Ltd. ISBN 978-0-7145-3543-2.
- Mistaken Identity: The Wrong Face of the Law, Peter Hain, 1976, Quartet Books ISBN 0-7043-3116-0
- Peter Hain and Simon Hebditch (1978). Radicals and Socialism. Institute for Workers' Control. ISBN 978-0-901740-55-7.
- Policing the Police, edited by Peter Hain, 1979, J Calder ISBN 0-7145-3624-5
- Peter Hain, ed. (1980). Debate of the Decade: The Crisis and Future of the Left. Pluto Press. ISBN 978-0-86104-313-2.
- Neighbourhood Participation, Peter Hain, 1980, M. T. Smith ISBN 0-85117-198-2
- Policing the Police, edited by Peter Hain, 1980, J Calder ISBN 0-7145-3796-9
- Peter Hain (1980). Reviving the Labour Party. Institute for Workers' Control. ISBN 978-0-901740-69-4.
- Peter Hain (1983). The Democratic Alternative: A Socialist Response to Britain's Crisis. Penguin Books Ltd. ISBN 978-0-14-006955-6.
- Peter Hain (1985). Political Trials in Britain. Penguin Books Ltd. ISBN 978-0-14-007935-7.
- Peter Hain (1986). Political Strikes: The State and Trade Unionism in Britain. Penguin Books Ltd. ISBN 978-0-14-007962-3.
- Proportional Misrepresentation, Peter Hain, 1986, Gower Publishing Ltd ISBN 0-7045-0526-6
- Peter Hain (1987). A Putney Plot?. Spokesman Books. ISBN 978-0-85124-481-5.
- Peter Hain (1995). Ayes to the Left. Lawrence & Wishart Ltd. ISBN 978-0-85315-832-5.
- Peter Hain (1995). The Peking Connection. Lawrence & Wishart Ltd. ISBN 978-0-85315-823-3.
- Peter Hain (1996). Sing the Beloved Country: Struggle for the New South Africa. Pluto Press. ISBN 978-0-7453-0997-2.
- Robin Cook and Peter Hain (2001). The End of Foreign Policy?. Royal Institute of International Affairs. ISBN 978-1-86203-131-9.
- New Designs for Europe, Katinkya Barysch, Steven Everts, Heather Grabbe et al., introduction by Peter Hain, 2002, Centre for European Reform ISBN 1-901229-35-1
- The Future Party, Peter Hain and Ian McCartney. Catalyst Press. 2004. ISBN 978-1-904508-10-6.
- Outside in (autobiography), Biteback (23 January 2012), ISBN 978-1-84954-118-3
- Ad & Wal: values, duty, sacrifice in apartheid South Africa, Biteback (January 2014), ISBN 978-1-84954-643-0
- Back to the future of socialism, Policy Press (26 January 2015), ISBN 978-1-44732-166-8
- Peter Hain (2021). A Pretoria Boy: The Story of South Africa's 'Public Enemy Number One'. Icon Books. ISBN 978-1785787638.

Parliament of the United Kingdom
| Preceded by Donald Coleman | Member of Parliament for Neath; 1991–2015 | Succeeded by Christina Rees |
Political offices
| Preceded by Keith Vaz | Minister of State for Europe; 2001–2002 | Succeeded by Denis MacShane |
| Preceded by Paul Murphy | Secretary of State for Wales; 2002–2008 | Succeeded by Paul Murphy |
| Preceded by Paul Murphy | Secretary of State for Northern Ireland; 2005–2007 | Succeeded by Shaun Woodward |
| Preceded by John Reid | Leader of the House of Commons; 2003–2005 | Succeeded by Geoff Hoon |
| Preceded by The Lord Williams of Mostyn | Lord Privy Seal; 2003–2005 | Succeeded by Geoff Hoon |
| Preceded by John Hutton | Secretary of State for Work and Pensions; 2007–2008 | Succeeded by James Purnell |
| Preceded by Paul Murphy | Secretary of State for Wales; 2009–2010 | Succeeded by Cheryl Gillan |
| Preceded by Cheryl Gillan | Shadow Secretary of State for Wales; 2010–2012 | Succeeded by Owen Smith |
Orders of precedence in the United Kingdom
| Preceded by The Lord Livermore | Gentlemen; Baron Hain | Followed by The Lord Watts |
