= D. J. Williams (politician) =

Welsh miner (1897–1972)

David James Williams (3 February 1897 – 12 September 1972) was a Welsh miner and checkweighman who became a Labour Party Member of Parliament (MP).

== Coal mining career ==
Williams was born in Tairgwaith in the Amman Valley to a South Wales family and went only to elementary school, leaving to work as a coal miner. Active in the South Wales Miners' Federation, he was eventually promoted to the job of checkweighman, away from the coal face. In 1924 he wrote a Book as a result of his studies at Ruskin College in Oxford, which denouncing mine owners and the development of their combines in swallowing up the coal industry. The book was published by the Labour Publishing Company under the title "Capitalist Combination in the Coal Industry". H.Francis & D Smith, The Fed, A History Of The South Wales Miners In The Twentieth Century, Cardiff University Press, 1998.

== Political activity ==
In 1931 Williams was elected to Pontardawe Rural District Council near Neath as a Labour Party candidate, and also elected to the Executive Council of the South Wales Miners' Federation. He was a member of a Miners' delegation to Russia, and also studied at the Central Labour College in London.

== Election ==
Sir William Jenkins, the MP for Neath, died in December 1944. As a local candidate, Williams won the sponsorship of the miners and was chosen to follow him; he was elected to Parliament at a by-election in May 1945. At the 1945 general election a few weeks later, his majority was among the highest in the country.

== Parliament ==
Williams was strongly opposed to continuing conscription and voted against the Labour whip to end it. He denounced Welsh Nationalism, supporting greater control of Wales by the rest of Britain, and lauded the Attlee government for its achievements in promoting full employment. In 1948 he agreed to speak to a group of miners on unofficial strike to urge them to accept a new wages settlement, which led to a solution of the dispute. Williams disliked the Soviet Union and denounced it for threatening the smaller nations of Europe.

Williams opposed the Macmillan government's application for Britain to join the European Economic Community. In 1964, he urged the Conservative government to intervene in a dispute in the private Welsh steel industry by setting up a Court of Inquiry. Later that year Williams announced his retirement, stating that on medical advice his health would not stand up to another Parliament.

Williams and his wife Jenny, lived in Cilfrew on the outskirts of Neath.

Parliament of the United Kingdom
Preceded by Sir William Jenkins	Member of Parliament for Neath; 1945–1964	Succeeded by Donald Coleman
