= Ysgol Dyffryn Nantlle =

Secondary school in Penygroes, Gwynedd, Wales

Coordinates: 53.0547°N 4.2789°W

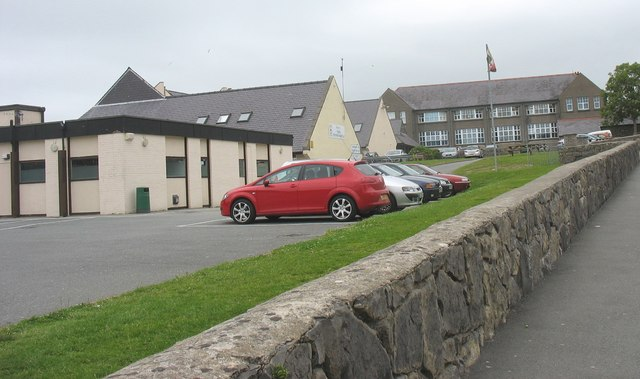
- Ysgol Dyffryn Nantlle from Ffordd Y Brenin

Location
- Ffordd Y Brenin; Kings Rd, Penygroes, Caernarfon LL54 6RL; Penygroes, Gwynedd, LL54 6RL; Wales

Information
- Mottoes: Delfryd Dysg Cymeriad, Nunlle fel Nantlle ("Education Builds Character", "Nowhere like Nantlle")
- Founded: 1898
- Authority: Gwynedd Council
- Headmistress: Mrs Rhian Parry Jones
- Age range: 11-18
- Enrollment: ~450 (2025)
- Language: Welsh, English
- Houses: Dulyn, Silyn, Llifon, Llyfnwy

Ysgol Dyffryn Nantlle is a bilingual secondary school for pupils aged between 11 and 18 years. It is situated in Penygroes, Gwynedd in Gwynedd, North Wales. The school serves the village of Penygroes and the surrounding rural area. As of 2025, there were over 450 pupils enrolled at the school.

== General information ==
78 per cent of pupils come from homes in which Welsh is the main language of the household. Nearly all pupils are able to speak Welsh to first language level.

On the school's badge, the words 'Delfryd Dysg Cymeriad' are inscribed, which translates to "The ideal of education is to build character" or more concisely "Education Builds Character". The school badge was devised by a former art teacher at the school, John Davies.

There are four registration classes in each school year, Y, D, N and P. There are also four school houses, Dulyn, Silyn, Llifon and Llyfnwy, which draw their names from local rivers and lakes. Pupils are allocated in one each of the four houses when enrolled in year 7. School houses compete annually in the sports day and in the historic school eisteddfod.

Following the end of year 11, the school provides pupils with the option of returning to the school for sixth form (years 12 and 13) instead of attending college or an apprenticeship.

The school encountered controversy in 2021 when the standing headmaster, Neil Foden, brought in a policy to refuse to provide school meals to children with any debt for school meals. The school later changed its policy after a major backlash including criticism from footballer and school meals campaigner Marcus Rashford.

== Notable former pupils ==
- R. Williams Parry
- Syr Thomas Parry
- John Gwilym Jones
- Gruffudd Parry
- Dafydd Glyn Jones
- Bryn Fôn
- Syr Bryn Terfel Jones
- Betty Williams
- Elan Closs Stephens
- Angharad Tomos
- Olwen Williams
- Owain Fon Williams
