= Geraint Davies (Labour politician) =

Welsh Labour Co-op politician

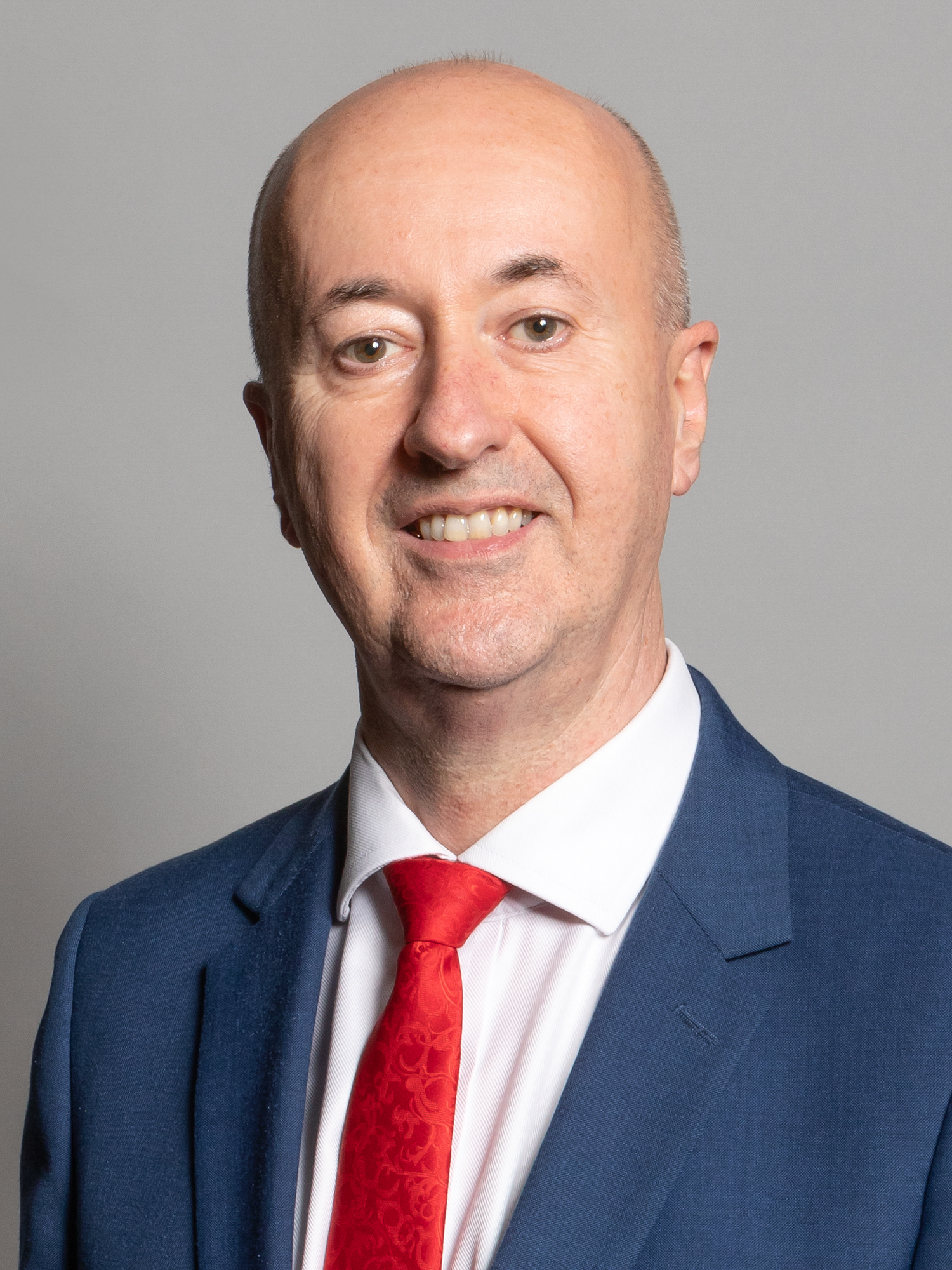
- Official portrait, 2020

Chair of the Environment, Food and Rural Affairs Select Committee
- Acting; 11 May 2022 – 25 May 2022
- Preceded by: Neil Parish
- Succeeded by: Robert Goodwill

Member of Parliament for Swansea West
- In office 6 May 2010 – 30 May 2024
- Preceded by: Alan Williams
- Succeeded by: Torsten Bell

Member of Parliament for Croydon Central
- In office 1 May 1997 – 11 April 2005
- Preceded by: Paul Beresford
- Succeeded by: Andrew Pelling

Leader of Croydon London Borough Council
- In office 1996–1997
- Preceded by: Mary Walker
- Succeeded by: Valerie Shawcross

Member of Croydon London Borough Council for New Addington
- In office 8 May 1986 – 24 July 1997
- Preceded by: Alan C. Lord
- Succeeded by: Christopher Ward

Personal details
- Born: Geraint Richard Davies; 3 May 1960 (age 66) Chester, England
- Party: Plaid Cymru
- Other political affiliations: Labour Co-op^{a} (until 2025)
- Spouse: Vanessa Fry (m. 1991)
- Education: Jesus College, Oxford
- Website: www.geraintdavies.org.uk
- a. Whip suspended since 1 June 2023

Geraint Richard Davies (born 3 May 1960) is a British politician who served as the Member of Parliament (MP) for Swansea West from 2010 to 2024. He was elected as a member of the Labour and Co-operative Party, but was suspended from the party in 2023 and sat the remainder of his term as an independent.

Previously, Davies was the Labour MP for Croydon Central from 1997 to 2005. He had also served as the Leader of Croydon London Borough Council.

== Early life and career ==
Geraint Davies was born on 3 May 1960 in Chester. His family comes from west Wales; his civil servant father is from Aberystwyth and his mother's family are from Swansea. He was brought up in Cardiff where he attended Llanishen High School, before studying Mathematics followed by Philosophy, Politics and Economics at Jesus College, Oxford where he was Junior Common Room President.

Davies joined Unilever as a Group Product Manager in 1982, before joining Colgate-Palmolive as a Marketing Manager. He then started his own companies including Pure Crete Ltd. and Equity Creative Ltd.

== Political career ==
Davies has been active in the Labour Party since 1982, being Assistant Secretary for Croydon North East Labour Party and Chair of Croydon Central Constituency Labour Party. He was a member of the Association of Scientific, Technical and Managerial Staffs, and later the Manufacturing, Science and Finance union. He has been a member of the Co-operative Party since 1984 and joined the GMB in 1985. Davies became Director of Pure Crete Ltd, described as a 'Green tour operator', in 1989.

Davies was elected to Croydon London Borough Council in 1986 representing New Addington ward, retaining the seat in 1990 and 1994. He became Chairman of the Housing Committee when Labour won control of Croydon London Borough Council in 1994.

He was elected Leader of the Council in 1996, resigning from the role and his council seat in 1997. He was also chair of the Housing Committee of the London Boroughs Association, the predecessor of London Councils, from 1996 to 1997.

== Parliamentary career ==
At the 1987 general election, Davies stood as the Labour Party candidate in Croydon South, coming third with 9.8% of the vote behind the incumbent Conservative MP William Clark and the Liberal Party candidate.

Davies stood in Croydon Central at the 1992 general election, coming second with 31.3% of the vote behind the Conservative candidate Paul Beresford.

=== MP for Croydon Central ===
At the 1997 general election, Davies was elected to Parliament as MP for Croydon Central with 45.6% of the vote and a majority of 3,897. He was re-elected as MP for Croydon Central at the 2001 general election with an increased vote share of 47.2% and an increased majority of 3,984.

Davies was awarded the Royal Humane Society's resuscitation certificate in December 1998 for saving a man's life in Mumbles, Swansea whilst on holiday that summer.

In May 2002 Davies presented the "Regulation of Child Care Providers Bill" in the aftermath of the eight-month-old son of two of his constituents being shaken to death by their childminder. His bill sought to set up a national mandatory register of nannies in England and Wales; to prevent childminders using corporal punishment on children in their care; to prevent child punishment through restricting parental contact, the consumption or deprivation of food or drink, inappropriate clothing, administering or withholding medication or medical treatment, depriving a child of sleep, undertaking intimate physical examination or withholding a disabled child's equipment. Two days later, Tony Blair responded to a question from Davies by giving his support for such a Bill proposing the setting up of a national register of nannies and prohibiting childminders in England from being allowed to smack the children in their care. In July 2003 Davies introduced the "Physical Punishment of Children (Prohibition) Bill" which would make it illegal for parents to physically punish children by striking them across the head, hitting them with an implement or shaking them. The Bill aimed to reduce child death from physical chastisement at a time that one-fifth of children were hit with implements and the Government had resisted calls to ban smacking. Davies’ changes were subsequently adopted under Section 58 of the Children Act 2004.

In May 2004 Davies’ proposed his "Regulation of Hormone Disrupting Chemicals Bill" which sought to impose precautionary bans on chemicals where there was evidence of then being dangerous to human health or to the environment and where a safer alternative existed. The Bill was supported by the World Wide Fund for Nature UK and was enacted by the EU in its REACH directive September 2006.

In June 2004 Davies published his Healthy Children Manifesto to ban junk food advertising to children and regulate food labeling. In January 2005 Davies published the "School Meals and Nutrition Bill" which sought to include nutrition in OFSTED inspections of schools and to ban unhealthy vending in schools. The Bill also sought to restrict the whereabouts of pupils during school hours to safeguard their access to healthy food.

For the year 2004–05, Davies' MP costs, including staff and offices in Parliament and his constituency, were the highest in the country. Davies said "this shows I was one of the most hard-working MPs in Britain." According to the Daily Telegraph this included over £4,000 on a central London flat 12 miles from his constituency home and taxi expenses he should not have been entitled to claim because of his second home. He also spent £38,750 on postage which he claimed were the result of his constituency Croydon Central being virtually the biggest and, due to the Lunar House Home Office Immigration Department, arguably the busiest in the UK. "Somebody has got to do the most work. I am proud it was me", he said. Davies repaid £156 used to post his annual report calendars by prepaid envelopes instead of stamps. Davies spent £2,285 on his kitchen and £1,500 on his living room at taxpayers' expense.

At the 2005 general election, Davies lost his seat to the Conservative candidate Andrew Pelling, coming second with 40.6% of the vote.

=== MP for Swansea West ===
Davies was elected to Parliament at the 2010 general election as MP for Swansea West with 34.7% of the vote and a majority of 504.

In September 2014 Davies put forward a Private Member's Bill to criminalise "Revenge Porn" to prohibit the distribution of sexually explicit images without consent and require that the default settings of mobile phones and personal computers deny access to pornography. He argued that the law must punish and deter the malicious uploading of private videos of former girlfriends which inflicted permanent and growing misery.

The Wikipedia article about Davies was one of a number edited ahead of the 2015 general election by computers inside Parliament, an act which the Daily Telegraph reported "appears to be a deliberate attempt to hide embarrassing information from the electorate". In Davies's case, the information deleted related to his expenses.

At the 2015 general election, Davies was re-elected as MP for Swansea West with an increased vote share of 42.6% and an increased majority of 7,036.

At the snap 2017 general election, Davies was again re-elected with an increased vote share of 59.8% and an increased majority of 10,598; the highest ever Labour share in Swansea West.

On 27 March 2017 Davies apologised to Speaker John Bercow for referring to Conservative MP Jacob Rees-Mogg as "Moggy" during a Commons debate about the EU referendum.

In December 2018, Davies wrote for The Independent arguing that the Leave campaign broke electoral rules. In January 2019 he again wrote in the paper, this time arguing against China as an ally for post-Brexit Britain and that "A People’s Vote on the terms of the deal is the only way forward".

In the series of Parliamentary votes on Brexit in March 2019, Davies voted against the Labour Party whip and in favour of an amendment tabled by members of The Independent Group for a second public vote.

Davies was again re-elected at the 2019 general election, with a decreased vote share of 51.6% and a decreased majority of 8,116.

In November 2021, The Independent revealed that Davies is one of 16 MPs who claimed expenses to cover their residential rent payments despite letting out their own properties in London. In Davies' case, he claimed £67,000 in taxpayer funding to rent a home between November 2017 and April 2021 while collecting rental payments from a home he owns in the capital.

=== Party suspension ===
On 1 June 2023, Davies was suspended from the Labour Party after it was claimed five women accused him of sexual harassment. Politico Europe alleged, based on interviews with those who had worked in Parliament, that he had a reputation of "excessive drinking, sexual comments and unwanted touching" toward "younger women in the workplace". Two of his colleagues claimed Davies had "boasted" about bringing sex workers into parliament for drinks. Davies denied all the claims responding "My lawyers have written to Sky about defamatory allegations and these are more false anonymous and libellous comments from an unidentified source". Davies was suspended that day, although no formal complaints had been received by the Labour Party.

=== Gaza ===
On 29 October 2023, it was reported that a Swansea NHS doctor and his young family, constituents of Davies, were trapped amidst the bombing of Gaza. After finding the Foreign Office unhelpful, the doctor contacted Davies, his MP, who wrote to both Rishi Sunak and Keir Starmer to highlight his constituent's plight and to call for a ceasefire. having previously done so to Foreign Secretary James Cleverly at a Foreign, Commonwealth and Development Office (FCDO) briefing.

After a month in the Gaza war zone, Davies’ constituents, Dr. Sabra, his wife and three children, got over the Rafah Crossing into Egypt to British Embassy officials. However, after three days, on 8 November 2023, Dr Sabra was separated from his family and forced back into Gaza, as he was not on the list approved by Israel and Egypt whilst his family, who were, went to Cairo. Davies said "This is more than a grotesque failure by the FCDO who are directly complicit according to the Egyptians in him being sent back to mortal danger. I have been in touch with No 10 which, alongside James Cleverly and Lord Ahmad who I am in touch with directly, must be held responsible for allowing this to happen. Dr Sabra who was already in the British Embassy's care has now been returned to face the risk of sudden death in Gaza". "He’s now been dumped on the street by the UK without shelter, 10% [phone] charge, and little data in a bomb zone" Davies said. Dr Sabra was finally allowed to return to the UK and Davies read out his WhatsApp message "I am humbled by your love and your passion for justice…Thank you. I love you all. Dr Ahmed Sabra" to a rally outside the Swansea Hospital Swansea where he had worked.

=== Retirement ===
On 28 May 2024, Davies announced "Having been suspended a year ago following anonymous allegations posted in the media, I am disappointed that I have yet to have a Labour Party hearing and the opportunity to clear my name" and that he would step down as an MP at the 2024 general election. He had been an MP for a total of 22 years when he stood down.

It was subsequently reported that none of the anonymous allegations repeated across the media on 1 June 2023 had materialised into complaints to the Labour Party despite this being the basis for his suspension; that he was not notified of any complaint for 23 weeks; that no hearing was provided in the year to the 2024 general election announcement or in the subsequent fortnight before candidate nominations closed; that he was thereby rendered ineligible to be the Labour Party Swansea West candidate; that the Labour official administering his case, Alex Barros-Curtis was parachuted into Cardiff West as Labour’s candidate as Torsten Bell was parachuted into Swansea West. However, it was later reported that prior to Davies’ candidacy being blocked Torsten Bell had previously been tipped for Cardiff West (and before that for Diane Abbot’s seat of Hackney North). Davies said that according to Welsh Labour Party guidance Beth Winter MP should have had first claim on any vacant Welsh seats so this was “a slap in the face for Wales as it once more gave precedence for London based parachutists over local candidates".

Six months later Davies resigned from the Labour Party having waited 18 months for a hearing having "completely lost my trust and confidence in the Labour Party to deliver justice and fairness in its complaints process". It was reported that when Davies was no longer an MP; a Party official who had responsibility for Labour parliamentary selections lodged a complaint against him; that the official was proven to be unreliable, having put forward false and refuted testimony, but the Labour Party insisted on pursuing their uncorroborated allegation. Davies responded that the situation was as the legal team to Nick Brown MP advised him: the process is "fundamentally, and inexcusably, flawed" and "grotesquely unfit for purpose, and open to flagrant abuse" and "I was subjected to a witch hunt and trial by the media then put on a political death row by the Labour Party. I had been unfairly de-selected by the Labour party and denied a hearing to prove it". Davies resigned, saying "I had served as a Labour MP for 22 years, and had waited 18 months for a hearing to prove my innocence only to find I could not expect a fair hearing" and that "if the Labour Party is to regain trust it must return to its traditional values of justice and fairness not just in its public policy, but also in its complaints procedure and candidate selections".

Prior to the 2026 Senedd election, he joined Plaid Cymru.

== Political Commentator ==
Davies is an active political commentator and analyst highlighting in "The rise and fall of Keir Starmer" that in 2024 Labour elected two thirds of MPs with a third of the votes, the same share as Jeremy Corbyn got in 2019 which became Labour’s grounds to expel him. According to Davies, Starmer chilled the economy, abandoned Labour values on welfare, sidelined peace, human rights and liberty and “posed as a Jeremy Corbyn supporter to become Labour Leader, as a trustworthy Tory to become Prime Minister and had called Britain “an island of strangers” to charm Reform voters” whilst supporting Peter Mandelson. So, after massive election losses, when Andy Burnham was re-elected MP, John Healey’s “perfectly timed resignation” as Defence Secretary forced Starmer to resign as Prime Minister. Later Davies argued, as Healey focused on military expenditure that our greatest threat is climate change not Russia. In another article Davies looked back a decade after Britain voted to leave the EU Davies blames Wales’ vote for Brexit on Welsh Labour Party’s failure to promote EU benefits before the 2016 Welsh Assembly elections.

In an article entitled "In the UK and Israel let’s put our values on a firm footing." Davies noted that the police didn’t identify or caution masked men in paramilitary uniform illegally blocking the port of Dover but did arrest those peacefully opposing genocide; that 2 ½ years after 28,000 had been killed in Gaza and his constituent Dr Sabra (who he helped escape from Gaza) said “It is a genocide….. every minute of the day is overshadowed with the smell of death, sound of death, sight of death, death as I have never experienced before. Davies also noted that since a further 70,000 have died; that President Netenyahu’s unfolding genocide would not protect Israel but fuel antisemitism; that banning trade with illegal West Bank settlers is too little too late; that therefore the UK Labour Government should confront right wing extremists in UK and Israel, ban arms to Israel and give MPs a free vote on the proscription of Palestine Action

Parliament of the United Kingdom
Preceded by Paul Beresford	Member of Parliament for Croydon Central; 1997–2005	Succeeded by Andrew Pelling
Preceded by Alan Williams	Member of Parliament for Swansea West; 2010–2024	Succeeded by Torsten Bell
