= Hugh Rees =

British politician and official (1928–2003)

John Edward Hugh Rees, FRICS (8 January 1928 – 1 December 2003) was a British chartered auctioneer and surveyor, and politician. After a single term as a Conservative Party Member of Parliament, he went on to have several notable public appointments.

== Early career ==
Rees was born in Swansea, and went to Parc Wern School and Glanmor School in Swansea before moving to Bromsgrove School. He trained as a chartered surveyor, and also became a Fellow of the Chartered Auctioneers and Estate Agents' Institute. He became involved in politics early in his life, and was Chairman of Glamorgan Young Conservative group council from 1954 to 1956 and then of Wales and Monmouthshire Young Conservative area council from 1956 to 1958.

== Parliament ==
At the 1959 general election, Rees won the Swansea West constituency as a Conservative, gaining the seat from Labour by a majority of 403 votes. Loyal to the government, Rees nevertheless stood up for Swansea against the prospect of Port Talbot steelworks taking all of South Wales' investment; he also defended his constituents who had their homes on a leasehold tenure. He was Parliamentary Private Secretary to Sir Keith Joseph from the end of May 1961.

== Whip's Office ==
Rees was appointed as an Assistant Government Whip in April 1962, effectively silencing him in the chamber. However, he appeared as one of three young Conservative MPs in a party election broadcast at the start of the 1964 general election campaign. Rees was unable to withstand the national swing against the Conservatives, and lost his seat. He could not win it back either at the 1966 or 1970 elections.

== Further appointments ==
Rees started his own business in Swansea after his defeat. He was also a Director of Abbey National plc from 1976 to 1991 and Chairman of their associated Abbey Housing Association Ltd from 1980 to 1992.

His public career was not over, as he was made Chairman of the Cambrian Housing Society in 1968. In the same year, he was appointed to the Council of the National Museum of Wales, on which he served for 26 years. In 1972 he was given a spot on the United Kingdom delegation to the European Community's Economic and Social Committee, on which he served until 1978. Under the Thatcher government, Rees was a member of the Welsh Development Agency from 1980 to 1986.

Rees was unwell for some time before his death, when he was found dead in his car. At his death, his successor Alan Williams (who subsequently became Father of the House of Commons) paid tribute to him for continuing to fight his ground in Swansea rather than find a better seat elsewhere.

Parliament of the United Kingdom
Preceded by Percy Morris	Member of Parliament for Swansea West; 1959–1964	Succeeded by Alan Williams
