= Christina Rees =

Welsh politician (born 1954)

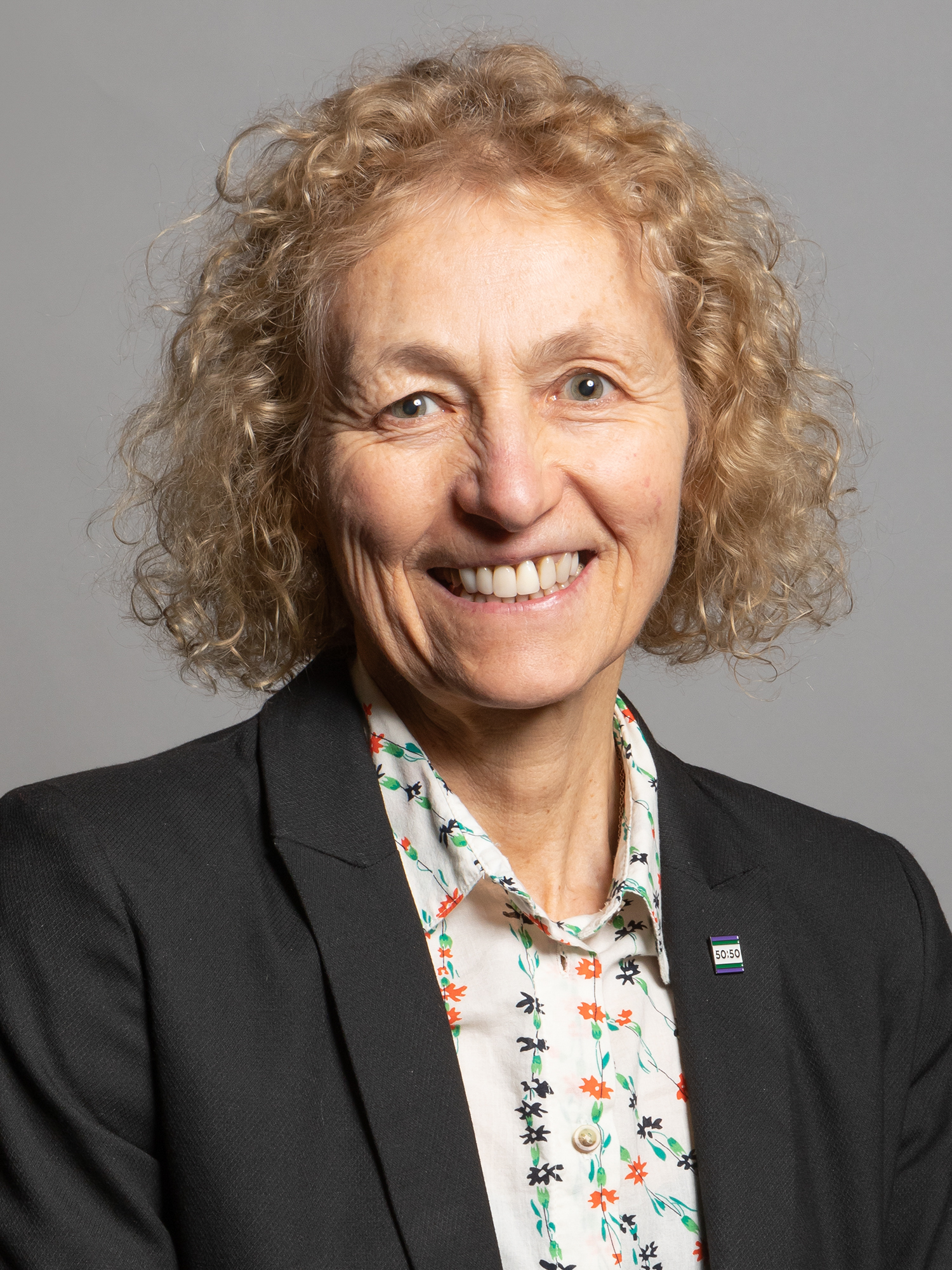
- Official portrait, 2020

Member of Parliament for Neath
- In office 7 May 2015 – 30 May 2024
- Preceded by: Peter Hain
- Succeeded by: Constituency abolished
Shadow portfolios
Shadow Secretary of State
2017–2020	Wales
Shadow Minister
2016–2017	Courts and Legal Aid

Member of Bridgend County Council for Newcastle
- In office 3 May 2012 – 7 May 2015
- Succeeded by: Neelo Farr

Personal details
- Born: 21 February 1954 (age 72) Kenfig Hill, Bridgend, Wales
- Party: Labour Co-op (Note: Suspended between 2022 and 2024.)
- Spouse(s): Ron Davies (div. 2000)
- Education: University of Wales (LLB)
- Website: christinarees.org

Christina Rees (born 21 February 1954) is a Welsh politician who served as Member of Parliament for Neath from 2015 to 2024. She is a member of the Labour and Co-operative parties.

== Early life ==
Rees was born on 21 February 1954, in the South Wales village of Kenfig Hill. Her father died early in her teenage years, so she was raised by her mother.

Rees became head girl of Cynffig Comprehensive School and excelled at a number of sports. Speaking as an adult, she stated: "I was very shy when I was a child and was bullied, so my mother sent me to judo classes to strengthen me up. I got a black belt first dan when I was 13." Rees represented Wales Schools at tennis, hockey, and athletics. Rees was also a member of the Great Britain Youth Team that competed at the Munich Olympics.

Rees was successful at squash, a sport for which she has represented Wales over 100 times.

== Career ==
Rees practised as a barrister before her election to Parliament.

She stood as the Labour candidate for Arfon in the National Assembly for Wales elections in May 2011, and was placed fourth on Labour's Wales-wide list for the 2014 European Elections.

Rees became MP for Neath following the UK general election of 2015. She was re-elected at the 2019 United Kingdom general election, but with a majority half of that she had in 2017.

Rees was appointed Shadow Minister for Courts and Legal Aid in January 2016, but quit her position during the mass resignation of Shadow ministers following the EU referendum. She supported Owen Smith in the 2016 Labour Party (UK) leadership election. She later became one of 33 Labour MPs to return to the front bench, taking the Courts and Legal Aid portfolio once again.

In February 2017, she was appointed to the position of Shadow Secretary of State for Wales.

In the 2020 Labour Party leadership election, Rees endorsed Keir Starmer for Labour Leader. She endorsed Angela Rayner for deputy leader.

In April 2020, Rees announced that she would be leaving the Official Opposition frontbench.

Rees was suspended from Labour on 13 October 2022, following allegations of bullying. She sat as an independent MP, until she was readmitted to the party and had the whip restored on 1 February 2024. The same day she announced that she would be standing down at the 2024 general election.

== Personal life ==
Rees was married to Ron Davies, a former Labour MP and Welsh Secretary, with whom she had a daughter. The couple separated in 1999, after Davies admitted to allegations of infidelity, and divorced in 2000. Rees is a vegan.

== Notes ==
Parliament of the United Kingdom
Preceded by Peter Hain	Member of Parliament for Neath; 2015–2024	Constituency abolished
Political offices
Preceded by Jo Stevens	Shadow Secretary of State for Wales; 2017–2020	Succeeded by Nia Griffith
