= Lewis Jones (politician) =

British Liberal National Party politician (1884–1968)

Sir Lewis Jones in 1937

Sir Lewis Jones (13 February 1884 – 10 December 1968) was a British Liberal National Party politician.

A former schoolmaster, Jones took up political work in 1910. He served with the Ministry of Munitions during World War I, and became secretary of the ministry's priority department.

A supporter of the National Government led by former Labour Party leader Ramsay MacDonald, he was elected as the Member of Parliament (MP) for Swansea West at the 1931 general election, unseating the sitting Labour MP Howel Samuel. Jones was re-elected in 1935, (when The Times described his campaign as having been subject to "organised rowdyism") and was knighted in 1944 for political and public services, but was heavily defeated at the 1945 general election.

Jones died in 1968 at his home in Swansea, aged 84. He had been secretary of the South Wales Siemens Steel Association for 44 years.

Parliament of the United Kingdom
Preceded by Howel Samuel	Member of Parliament for Swansea West; 1931 – 1945	Succeeded by Percy Morris
