= Donald Coleman =

British politician (1925–1991)

Donald Coleman CBE JP DL

Vice-Chamberlain of the Household
- In office 1978–1979
- Preceded by: James Hamilton
- Succeeded by: Anthony Berry

Member of Parliament for Neath
- In office 15 October 1964 – 14 January 1991
- Preceded by: D. J. Williams
- Succeeded by: Peter Hain

Personal details
- Born: Donald Richard Coleman; 19 September 1925 Barry, Wales
- Died: 14 January 1991 (aged 65) London, England
- Party: Labour
- Spouses: Phyllis Williams (m. 1949; died 1963); Margaret Morgan (m. 1966)
- Children: 2
- Education: University College of Wales Swansea

Donald Richard Coleman, CBE, JP, DL (19 September 1925 – 14 January 1991) was the Labour Member of Parliament (MP) in the United Kingdom for Neath from 1964 until his death in 1991.

== Early life ==
Coleman was born in Barry, the son of a coalminer, Albert Archer Coleman, and his wife, Winifred Marguerite. For most of the inter-war years, his father was unemployed, and did not find permanent work until 1939. This instilled in his son a lifelong belief in the evils of unemployment.

He was educated at Cadoxton Boys' School and Cardiff Technical College. He later attended University College of Wales Swansea as a mature student between 1950 and 1954. He held a number of technical positions at various laboratories at Cardiff and Swansea before securing an appointment in 1954 as metallurgist to the Research Department of the Steel Company of Wales, Abbey Works, Port Talbot, in which position he remained until his election to parliament in the General Election of October 1964. Coleman had joined the Labour Party in November 1948 and became a member of the Co-operative Party in 1955. He had also stood as a Labour candidate for Swansea Borough Council in 1960.

== Parliamentary career ==
Until the 1960s, Neath was regarded as a predominantly coal-mining constituency, and thus as a seat where the nominee of the National Union of Mineworkers would have a considerable advantage at the selection conference. Indeed, both of Coleman's long-serving predecessors had been NUM nominees. However, Coleman, against the expectations, was chosen at the fourth ballot and thus inherited one of the safest Labour seats in the whole of Britain.

Coleman served as PPS to George Thomas, Secretary of State for Wales, and was thus in effect a junior minister. He was also an opposition whip, 1970–1974, Lord of the Treasury 1974–1978, Vice-Chamberlain of the Household 1978–1979, and opposition spokesman on Welsh affairs, 1981–1983. He also served as delegate to the Council of Europe.

Coleman was regarded as being on the right wing of the Labour Party and in September 1983 he backed Peter Shore, rather than his Welsh colleague Neil Kinnock for party leader and Denzil Davies, the MP for Llanelli, for deputy leader. Following Kinnock's election as leader, Coleman did not hold another front bench position.

Coleman announced in early 1990 that he intended to stand down from parliament at the next General Election.

== Personal life ==
Coleman was especially prominent in the public life of Neath, Swansea and West Glamorgan, and his leisure interests included membership of the chorus of the Welsh National Opera.

He married, in 1949, Phyllis Eileen Williams, who died in 1963. They had one son. In January 1966 he married Margaret Elizabeth Morgan and they had one daughter.

Although he had announced his retirement the previous year, Coleman remained an MP until he had a fatal heart attack on 14 January 1991, on a train from Neath to London. He was pronounced dead at St Mary's Hospital, London, and was cremated at Margam Crematorium. The Labour Party held his seat in the subsequent by-election, which was won by Peter Hain.

== Sources ==
=== Online ===
- Jones, John Graham. "Donald Coleman". Dictionary of Welsh Biography. National Library of Wales.

Parliament of the United Kingdom
Preceded by D. J. Williams	Member of Parliament for Neath; 1964–1991	Succeeded by Peter Hain
Political offices
Preceded by James Hamilton	Vice-Chamberlain of the Household; 1978–1979	Succeeded by Anthony Berry
