= Howel Samuel =

Howel Walter Samuel (1881 – 5 April 1953) was a British Labour Party politician.

He was elected as the member of parliament (MP) for Swansea West at the 1923 general election, winning a 3-way contest by a majority of only 115 votes (0.6% of the total), having contested the seat unsuccessfully in 1922. He was defeated at the 1924 general election by the Liberal Party candidate Walter Runciman, but at the 1929 general election Ruciman stood instead in St Ives and Samuel regained the seat.

In 1931, when Labour had split over its leader Ramsay MacDonald's decision to leave the party and form a Conservative Party-dominated National Government, he faced only one opponent, the Liberal National candidate Lewis Jones, who took the seat. Samuel did not stand for Parliament again.

Parliament of the United Kingdom
Preceded by Sir Alfred Mond, Bt	Member of Parliament for Swansea West; 1923 – 1924	Succeeded by Walter Runciman
Preceded by Walter Runciman	Member of Parliament for Swansea West; 1929 – 1931	Succeeded by Lewis Jones
