= Percy Morris =

British politician (1893–1967)

Percy Morris CBE JP (6 October 1893 – 7 March 1967) was a British railway clerk, trade unionist and politician who became Mayor of Swansea and represented the town in Parliament. He specialised in railway issues in Parliament, and after being defeated for re-election, he served on public boards in the field of transport and social security.

== Railway clerk ==
Morris was born in Swansea, one of ten children of Thomas, an Engineman at the local Copper Works and his wife Emma. He attended Manselton Elementary School followed by Dynevor Secondary School. On leaving school in 1908 he joined the administrative staff of the Great Western Railway. He joined the Railway Clerks' Association of Great Britain and Ireland and became an active trade unionist. While he was still in his teens, he became involved in the political Labour movement and was said to be "in much demand" as a public speaker. He became a member of the executive committee of the Railway Clerks' Association in 1930.

== 1935 election ==
In 1927 Morris was elected to Swansea County Borough Council, on which he became chair of the Parliamentary Committee. He was selected in January 1934 to be the prospective Labour Party candidate for Swansea West after the previous candidate was made a Judge. When the general election campaign started Morris was gloomy about the economic prospects of Swansea which he saw losing out to Ebbw Vale in tinplate manufacture. Morris cut the majority of the sitting Liberal National MP from 6,016 to 2,081 in the election.

== Civil defence in wartime ==
Morris was chosen as an Alderman of Swansea and became a Justice of the Peace on the local bench in 1939. As chairman of Swansea A.R.P. committee in 1941, he was presented to the King and Queen when they visited Swansea. At the end of July he was appointed Deputy Regional Commissioner for Civil Defence in the Wales Region. He was also made President of the Railway Clerk's Association in 1943 (a post he held for ten years, including after the merger in which it became the Transport Salaried Staffs' Association), and served as Deputy Mayor of Swansea from 1944 to 1945.

As the war came to an end, Morris resigned his Civil Defence post, in order to fight for election in Swansea West in the 1945 general election. Although reports during the campaign suggested that the sitting member felt his campaign was successful, on polling day Morris was returned with a majority of 5,009.

== Railway nationalisation ==
Morris made his maiden speech in November 1945, urging that the Government persuade both the United States and Soviet Union to discard the atomic bomb. He backed a rebel amendment to the loyal address in reply to the King's Speech in November 1946, opposing the operation of conscription in peace-time., although he welcomed the nationalisation of the railways, saying that the big four railway companies had "brought their difficulties on themselves by their stubborn neglect of the public interest".

In February 1947, Morris again broke the whip to oppose a government amendment which allowed civic restaurants to sell alcoholic drinks, and to support an amendment to prevent their sale in Wales. He opposed the National Service Bill in 1947 which continued civilian conscription, and then voted to support rebel amendments to restrict conscription to England only, or to remove Wales.

== Railway finances ==
Morris suffered a reduction in his majority to 3,665 at the 1950 general election. He pressed in the new Parliament for increased charges or subsidy to the railways in order to have industrial peace. In 1951 he criticised an opposition motion which called for increased railway charges to be annulled, arguing that the new charges on their own would not solve the problem. He stated that if the increased charges were rejected, then Labour members would recast the entire financial structure of the railway industry. At this time he was reckoned an ally of Herbert Morrison in the Labour Party.

== In opposition ==
At the 1951 general election Morris' majority was again reduced to 2,160. He criticised the new Conservative Government's approach to railways, describing the Transport Bill introduced in 1952 as giving the Minister powers that would "make him the virtual dictator of transport" and "the Führer of British transport". He carried his opposition through the Bill's Parliamentary stages and after it had come into force he said he believed it had been prompted by the Government's need to repay a political debt to the Road Haulage Association. Morris pledged that a Labour government would renationalise road haulage when it got the opportunity.

Morris was the lead speaker for the opposition in a debate on the tinplate industry in January 1953, in which he called for a full-time Minister for Wales instead of it being one of the responsibilities of the Home Secretary. In September 1953 he brokered a solution to a dispute between Swansea market meat traders and the Ministry of Food over the distribution of 30 sides of fat beef. In 1954 he was one of five Members of Parliament to tour British colonial territories in the far east.

== Marginal seat ==
After a minor boundary revision, Morris had a difficult fight at the 1955 general election in which for the first time his opponent was a Conservative without affiliation to the National Liberal Party. The redevelopment of Swansea town centre was reckoned to help the Conservatives, although some large council housing estates had been built. Morris was chosen as Mayor of the town shortly before the election, and on polling day he retained his seat with the slender majority of 1,021.

As Mayor of Swansea, Morris politely deferred to Cardiff which was applying for recognition as the capital of Wales. He became increasing interested in local government issues, especially finance, and in 1957 criticized the block grant system for neglecting education funding.

== Swansea Castle ==
In April 1957 Morris was ordered to pay £1,350 damages to a pedestrian whom he had knocked down on a zebra crossing while driving his car. Morris remained an active member of Swansea council and in July 1957 as chairman of the Parliamentary Committee, he pressed the Minister of Works to remove Swansea Castle from the list of ancient monuments. He argued that the castle was a "shambles" and that the council did not have the money to pay for its repair, but redevelopment of the site was in the town's interests. In 1958 he was made a Freeman of the County Borough of Swansea.

== Defeat ==
For the 1959 general election, Morris' seat was one of the most high-profile marginal seats in the country. He had Aneurin Bevan to open his campaign, and attacked the Conservative Government for increasing unemployment. However, the Conservatives also had high-profile support including from Prime Minister Harold Macmillan. Local people were thought to be against nationalisation and Swansea Council had embarked on a controversial plan of comprehensive education to which Morris was tied by virtue of his high rank within the council leadership. An energetic young Conservative candidate, Hugh Rees defeated Morris by 403 votes.

Morris remained Chairman of the Parliamentary Committee on Swansea County Borough Council. Immediately after the election one Labour Alderman moved a motion protesting against remarks by Field-Marshal Lord Montgomery who had questioned the sanity of people who intended to vote for the Labour Party. Morris argued that as Montgomery "had had the grace to apologise, the committee should have equal grace to accept the apology".

== National Assistance Board ==
In early 1960 Morris was appointed to the Western Area Board of the British Transport Commission, and announced that he would not stand to try to regain his seat in Parliament. At the end of the year, he was also appointed to the National Assistance Board, and was reappointed for a further term two years later. In January 1965 he was promoted to be Deputy Chairman of the Board. When the National Assistance Board was replaced by the Supplementary Benefits Commission in 1966, Morris retained his position; he was also a member of the council of University College, Swansea.

== Personal ==
Morris married, first, in 1920 Elizabeth, daughter of William Davies. She and Morris's sister and brother-in-law, were killed during the German bombing of Swansea in January 1941. He married, second, in 1956 Catherine Evans, Matron of Morriston Hospital. His home was at Lôn Cedwyn, Sketty, Swansea. He died on 7 March 1967.

Parliament of the United Kingdom
Preceded by Sir Lewis Jones	Member of Parliament for Swansea West; 1945 – 1959	Succeeded by Hugh Rees
Trade union offices
Preceded by Frederick Charles Watkins	President of the Railway Clerks' Association; 1943 – 1953	Succeeded by James Haworth
