= 2024 United Kingdom general election in Wales =

- 4 July 2024

All 32 Welsh seats to the House of Commons
- Turnout: 56.0% (▼10.6%)
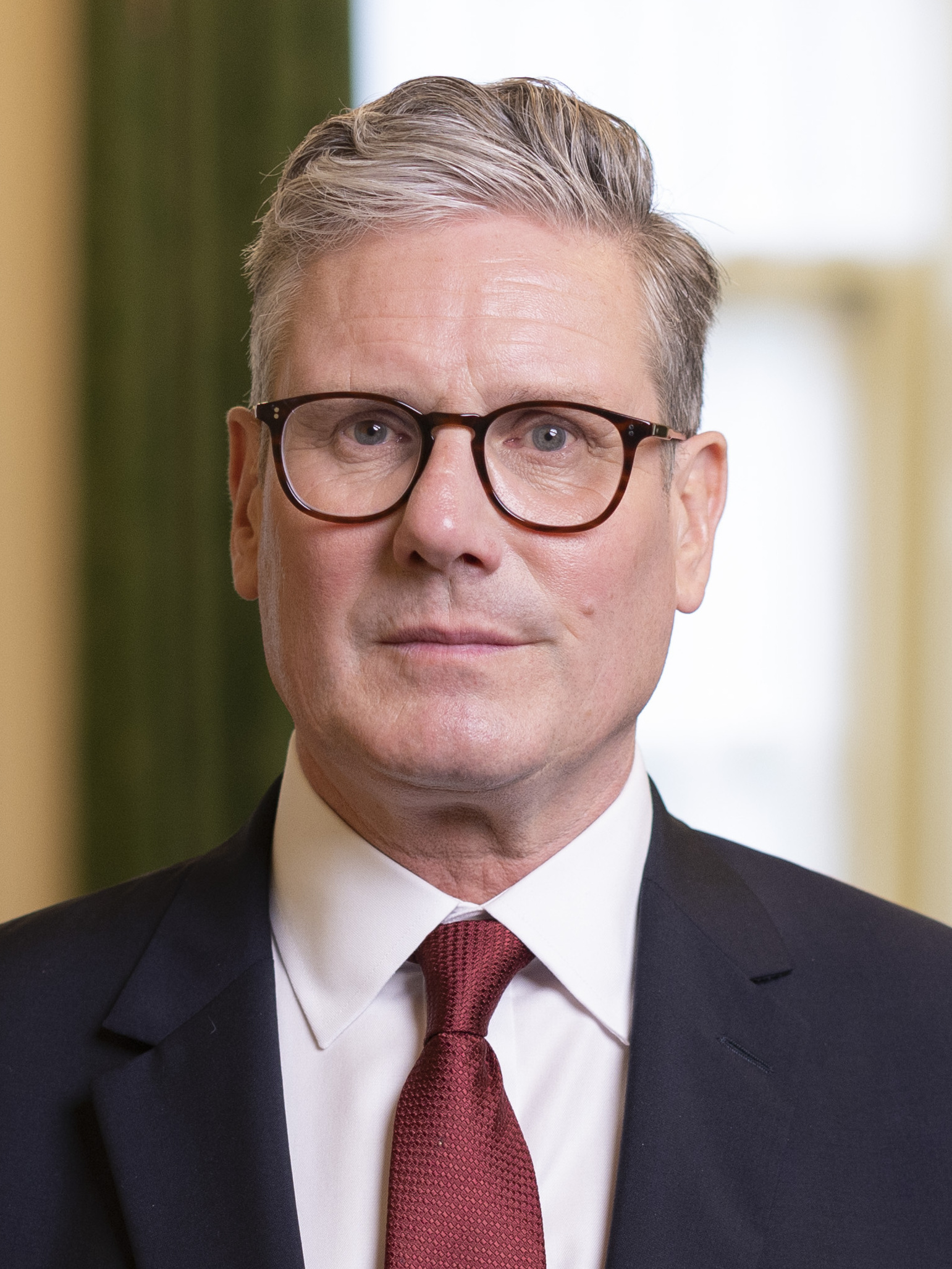

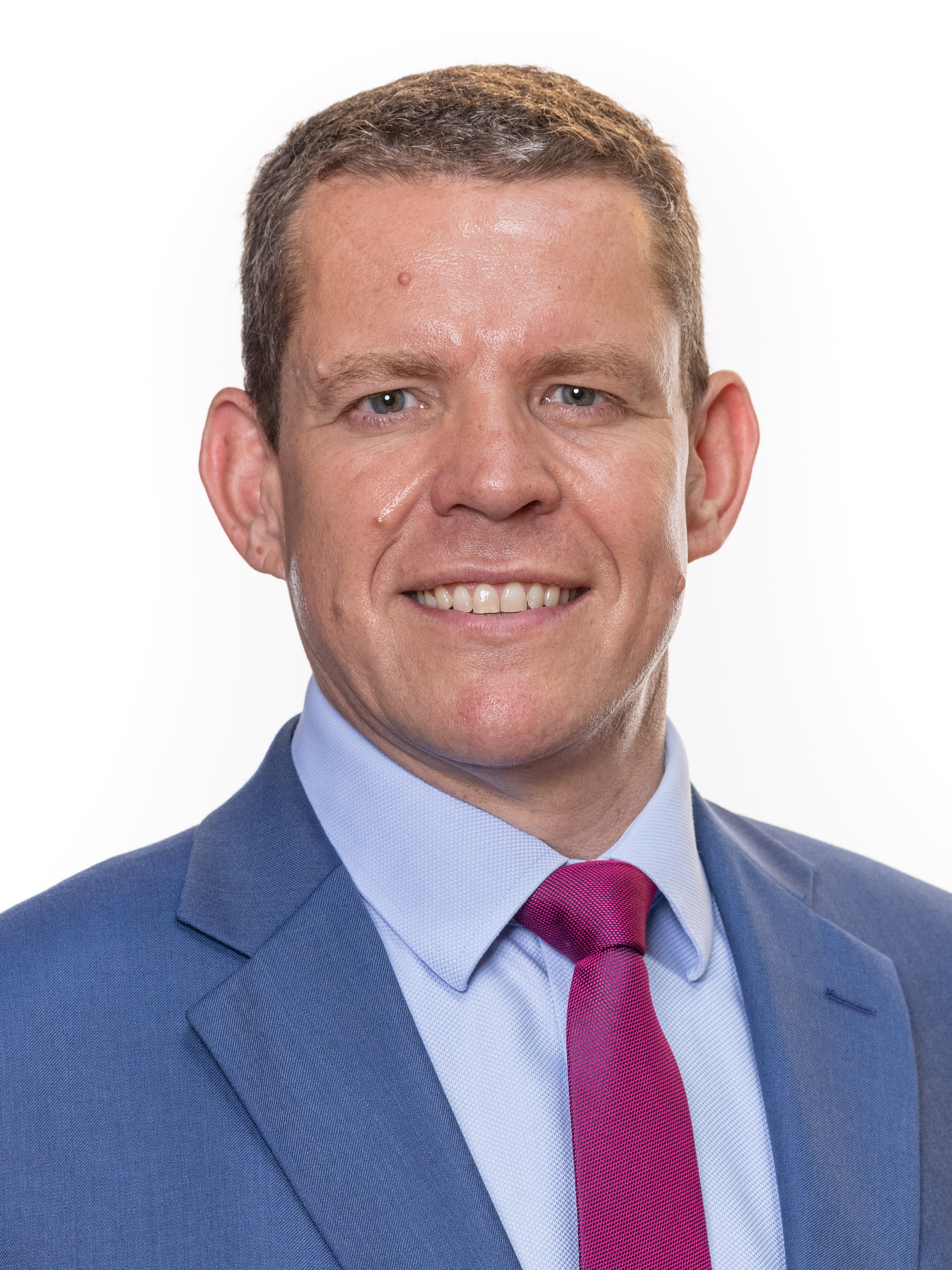

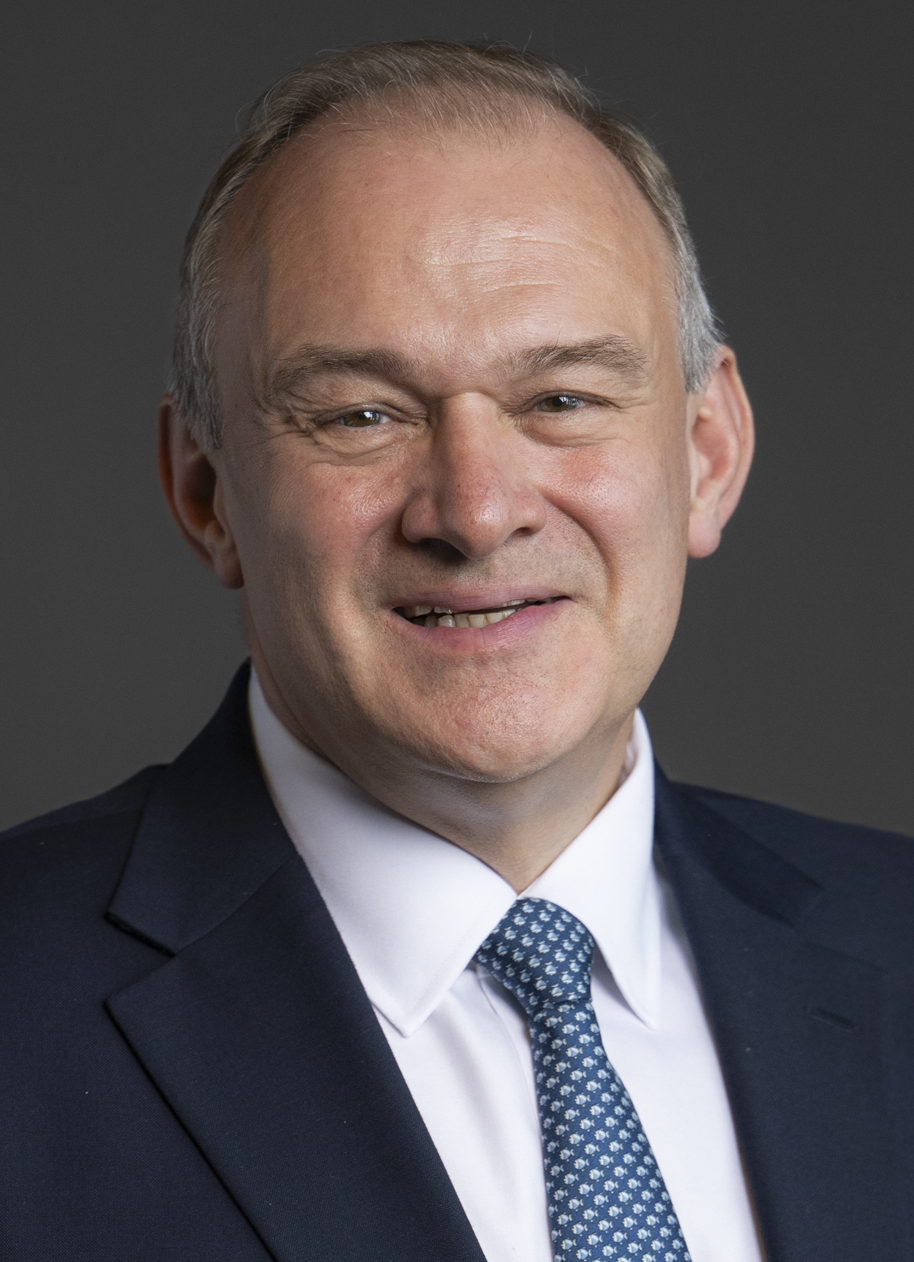

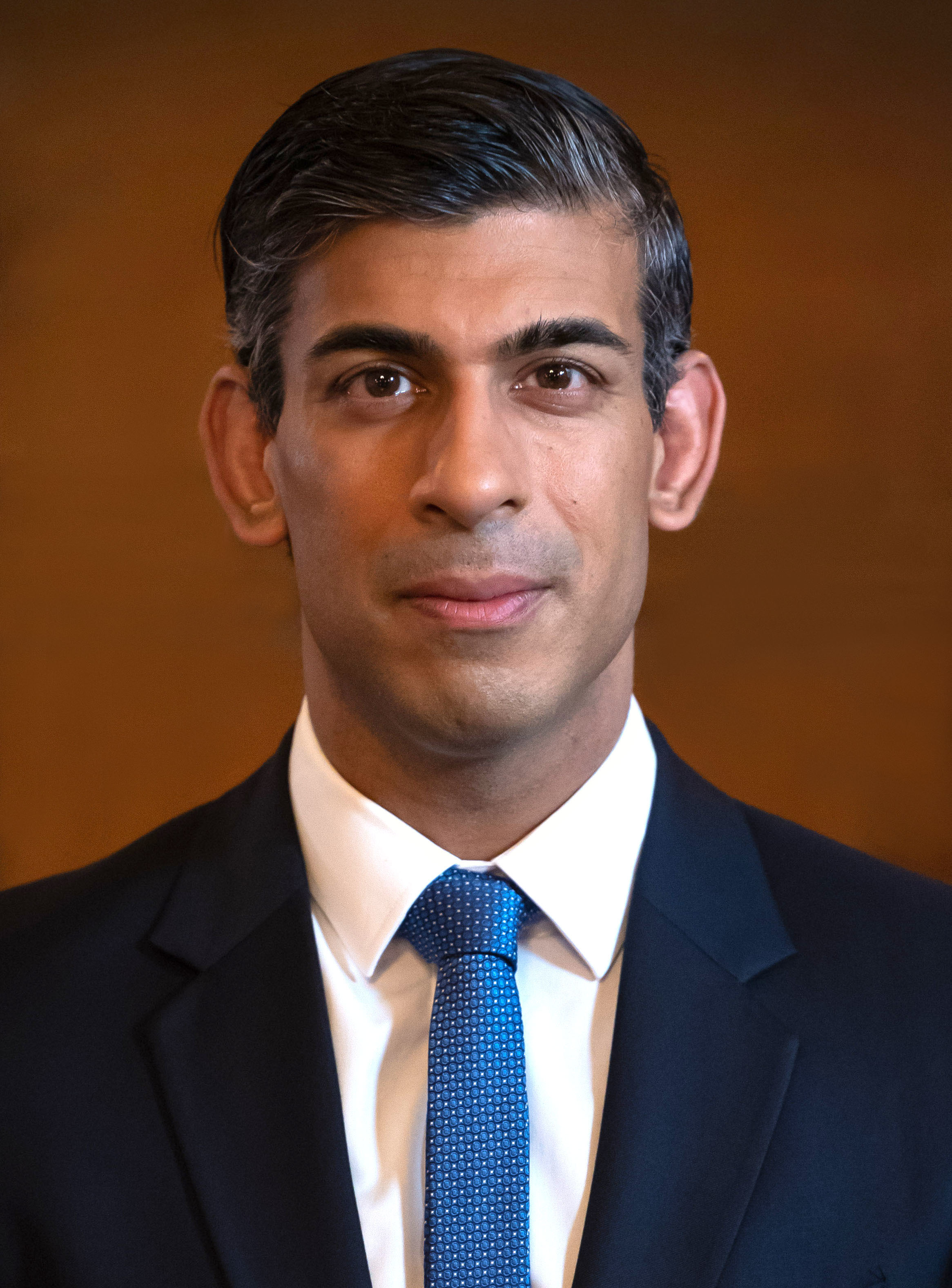
	First party	Second party
Leader	Keir Starmer	Rhun ap Iorwerth
Party	Labour	Plaid Cymru
Leader since	4 April 2020	16 June 2023
Leader's seat	Holborn and St Pancras	Did not stand
Last election	22 seats, 40.9%	4 seats, 9.9%
Seats before	21	3
Seats won	27	4
Seat change	▲9^{‡}	▲2^{‡}
Popular vote	487,636	194,812
Percentage	37.0%	14.8%
Swing	▼3.9 pp	▲4.9 pp
	Third party	Fourth party
Leader	Ed Davey	Rishi Sunak
Party	Liberal Democrats	Conservative
Leader since	27 August 2020	24 October 2022
Leader's seat	Kingston and Surbiton	Richmond and Northallerton
Last election	0 seats, 6.0%	14 seats, 36.1%
Seats before	0	13
Seats won	1	0
Seat change	▲1^{‡}	▼12^{‡}
Popular vote	85,911	240,003
Percentage	6.5%	18.2%
Swing	▲0.5 pp	▼17.9 pp
- Results by constituency: ^{‡} owing to electoral boundaries changing, this figure is notional

On 4 July 2024, the 2024 United Kingdom general election was held in Wales, to elect all 650 members of the House of Commons, including the 32 Welsh seats.

Thirty-two seats were up for election in Wales, a decrease from 40, as the general election occurred after a boundary review took effect. The Labour Party remained the largest party in Wales, gaining six seats for a total of 27. Both Plaid Cymru and the Liberal Democrats made gains, taking them to four seats and one seat respectively. The Conservatives lost all thirteen seats they had held previously, leaving the party without Westminster representation from Wales for the first time since 2005.

== Election ==
=== Date of the election ===
On 22 May 2024, Prime Minister Rishi Sunak announced 4 July 2024 as the election date.

=== Number of Welsh MPs ===
Welsh constituencies used in the election, labelled.

The Parliamentary Voting System and Constituencies Act 2011, as amended by the Parliamentary Constituencies Act 2020, mandated the number of seats in Wales be reduced from 40 to 32 to more accurately reflect its share of registered voters, including one coterminous with the Isle of Anglesey. The Boundary Commission for Wales was responsible for drawing up proposals for the new constituency boundaries, but it was required to abide by this total.

The 2023 Periodic Review of Westminster constituencies began in 2020 and concluded in 2023. Initial proposals were published in September 2021. The revised proposals were published on 19 October 2022 followed by a four-week consultation period. On 28 June 2023, the Boundary Commission for Wales published its final recommendations for the new Welsh constituencies. These changes were approved at a meeting of the Privy Council on 15 November. and came into force on 29 November.

=== Constituencies ===
- Aberafan Maesteg
- Alyn and Deeside
- Bangor Aberconwy
- Blaenau Gwent and Rhymney
- Brecon, Radnor and Cwm Tawe
- Bridgend
- Caerfyrddin
- Caerphilly
- Cardiff East
- Cardiff North
- Cardiff South and Penarth
- Cardiff West
- Ceredigion Preseli
- Clwyd East
- Clwyd North
- Dwyfor Meirionnydd
- Gower
- Llanelli
- Merthyr Tydfil and Aberdare
- Mid and South Pembrokeshire
- Monmouthshire
- Montgomeryshire and Glyndŵr
- Neath and Swansea East
- Newport East
- Newport West and Islwyn
- Pontypridd
- Rhondda and Ogmore
- Swansea West
- Torfaen
- Vale of Glamorgan
- Wrexham
- Ynys Môn

== Members not standing for re-election ==
MP	Constituency	First elected	Party	Date announced
Wayne David	Caerphilly	2001	Labour	11 February 2022
Hywel Williams	Arfon	2001	Plaid Cymru	11 November 2022
Beth Winter	Cynon Valley (Note: Constituency was abolished and Winter lost the contest to be selected for another seat)	2019	Labour	7 June 2023
David Jones	Clwyd West	2005	Conservative	20 September 2023
Jamie Wallis	Bridgend	2019	Conservative	22 October 2023
Christina Rees	Neath	2015	Labour	1 February 2024
Kevin Brennan	Cardiff West	2001	Labour	27 May 2024
Geraint Davies	Swansea West	1997 (Note: Originally elected as the MP for Croydon Central in the 1997 general election, but lost his seat in 2005; elected for Swansea West in 2010.)	Labour (Note: Sat as an independent from June 2023.)	28 May 2024
Jonathan Edwards	Carmarthen East and Dinefwr	2010	Plaid Cymru (Note: Sat as an independent from July 2020.)	28 May 2024

== Candidates ==
Affiliation	Candidates
Conservative and Unionist Party	32
Green Party of England and Wales	32
Labour Party	32
Liberal Democrats	32
Plaid Cymru	32
Reform UK	31
Independents	17 (15 constituencies)
Heritage Party	6
Workers Party of Britain	4
Abolish the Welsh Assembly Party	3
Co-operative Party	3 (Note: In electoral pact with the Labour Party, all candidates are also standing for the Labour Party)
Official Monster Raving Loony Party	2
Trade Unionist and Socialist Coalition	2
Women's Equality Party	2
Climate Party	1
Communist Party of Britain	1
Libertarian Party (UK)	1
Propel	1
Socialist Labour Party (UK)	1
True and Fair Party	1
UK Independence Party	1
Total	235

== Results ==
=== By affiliation ===
Affiliation	Candidates	Seats					Aggregate votes		
Affiliation	Candidates	Total	Gains	Losses	Net	Of all (%)	Total	Of all (%)	Change (%)
Labour	32	27	8	0	▲9	84.4	487,636	37.0	▼3.9
Conservative	32	0	0	12	▼12	0.0	240,003	18.2	▼17.9
Reform	31	0	0	0	Steady	0.0	223,018	16.9	▲11.5
Plaid Cymru	32	4	2	0	▲2	12.5	194,811	14.8	▲4.9
Liberal Democrats	32	1	1	0	▲1	3.1	85,911	6.5	▲0.5
Green	32	0	0	0	Steady	0.0	61,662	4.7	▲3.7
Independent	17	0	0	0	Steady	0.0	17,593	1.3	▲0.9
Workers Party	4	0	New			0.0	1,545	0.1	New
Abolish	3	0	Did not stand in 2019			0.0	1,521	0.1	—N/a
Propel	1	0	New			0.0	1,041	0.1	New
Heritage	6	0	New			0.0	926	0.1	New
UKIP	1	0	Did not stand in 2019			0.0	600	0.0	—N/a
Women's Equality	2	0	Did not stand in 2019			0.0	536	0.0	—N/a
TUSC	2	0	Did not stand in 2019			0.0	532	0.0	—N/a
Communist	1	0	Did not stand in 2019			0.0	521	0.0	—N/a
Socialist Labour	1	0	Did not stand in 2019			0.0	424	0.0	—N/a
Monster Raving Loony	2	0	0	0	Steady	0.0	393	0.0	Steady
True & Fair	1	0	New			0.0	255	0.0	New
Climate	1	0	New			0.0	104	0.0	New
Libertarian	1	0	Did not stand in 2019			0.0	44	0.0	—N/a
Total	235	32			0	100.0	1,319,076	100.0	0.0
Registered voters, and turnout							2,347,783	56.0	▼10.6

Aggregate votes
Labour	37%
Conservative	18.2%
Reform UK	16.9%
Plaid Cymru	14.8%
Liberal Democrats	6.5%
Greens	4.7%

Seats
Labour	84.375%
Plaid Cymru	12.5%
Liberal Democrats	3.125%

=== By constituency ===
Constituency	2019 seat	2024 seat					Votes								Turnout
Constituency	2019 seat	Affiliate	Candidate	Votes	Share	Majority	Lab.	Con.	Ref.	PC	Lib. Dems	Green	Other	Total	Turnout
Aberafan Maesteg	Lab	Lab	Stephen Kinnock	17,838	49.9%	10,354	17,838	2,903	7,484	4,719	916	1,094	801	35,755	49.3%
Alyn and Deeside	Lab	Lab	Mark Tami	18,395	42.4%	8,794	18,395	7,892	9,601	1,938	2,065	1,926	1,575	43,392	57.3%
Bangor Aberconwy	Con	Lab	Claire Hughes	14,008	33.6%	4,896	14,008	9,036	6,091	9,112	1,524	1,361	528	41,660	59.1%
Blaenau Gwent and Rhymney	Lab	Lab	Nick Smith	16,027	53.6%	12,183	16,027	3,776	—N/a	3,844	1,268	1,719	3,288	29,922	42.7%
Brecon, Radnor and Cwm Tawe	Con	LD	David Chadwick	13,736	29.5%	1,472	9,904	12,264	6,567	2,280	13,736	1,188	609	46,548	63.7%
Bridgend	Con	Lab	Chris Elmore	16,516	39.9%	8,595	16,516	6,764	7,921	3,629	1,446	1,760	3,338	41,482	56.6%
Caerfyrddin	Con	PC	Ann Davies	15,520	34.0%	4,505	10,985	8,825	6,944	15,520	1,461	1,371	498	45,604	61.6%
Caerphilly	Lab	Lab	Chris Evans	14,538	38.0%	6,419	14,538	4,385	7,754	8,119	1,788	1,650	—N/a	38,234	52.6%
Cardiff East	Lab	Lab	Jo Stevens	15,833	40.5%	9,097	15,833	3,913	4,980	3,550	6,736	3,916	195	39,123	53.7%
Cardiff North	Lab	Lab	Anna McMorrin	20,849	43.9%	11,207	20,849	9,642	5,985	4,669	3,168	3,160	—N/a	47,473	66.4%
Cardiff South and Penarth	Lab	Lab	Stephen Doughty	17,428	44.5%	11,767	17,428	5,459	4,493	3,227	2,908	5,661	—N/a	39,176	53.6%
Cardiff West	Lab	Lab	Alex Barros-Curtis	16,442	36.7%	7,019	16,442	6,835	5,626	9,423	1,921	3,157	1,353	44,757	59.1%
Ceredigion Preseli	PC	PC	Ben Lake	21,738	46.9%	14,789	5,386	4,763	5,374	21,738	6,949	1,864	228	46,302	61.2%
Clwyd East	Con	Lab	Becky Gittins	18,484	38.7%	4,622	18,484	13,862	7,626	3,733	1,859	1,659	599	47,822	62.4%
Clwyd North	Con	Lab	Gill German	14,794	35.5%	1,196	14,794	13,598	7,000	3,159	1,685	1,391	—N/a	41,627	55.5%
Dwyfor Meirionnydd	PC	PC	Liz Saville Roberts	21,788	53.9%	15,876	5,912	4,712	4,857	21,788	1,381	1,448	297	40,395	55.3%
Gower	Lab	Lab	Tonia Antoniazzi	20,480	43.4%	11,567	20,480	8,913	8,530	3,942	2,593	2,488	283	47,229	62.0%
Llanelli	Lab	Lab	Nia Griffith	12,751	31.3%	1,504	12,751	4,275	11,247	9,511	1,254	1,106	600	40,744	57.0%
Merthyr Tydfil and Aberdare	Lab	Lab	Gerald Jones	15,791	44.8%	7,447	15,791	2,687	8,344	4,768	1,276	1,231	1,118	35,215	47.3%
Mid and South Pembrokeshire	Con	Lab	Henry Tufnell	16,505	35.4%	1,878	16,505	14,627	7,828	2,962	2,372	1,654	681	46,629	59.0%
Monmouthshire	Con	Lab	Catherine Fookes	21,010	41.3%	3,338	21,010	17,672	5,438	1,273	2,279	2,357	815	50,844	68.0%
Montgomeryshire and Glyndŵr	Con	Lab	Steve Witherden	12,709	29.4%	3,815	12,709	7,775	8,894	5,667	6,470	1,744	—N/a	43,259	58.4%
Neath and Swansea East	Lab	Lab	Carolyn Harris	16,797	41.8%	6,627	16,797	3,765	10,170	5,350	2,344	1,711	—N/a	40,137	52.6%
Newport East	Lab	Lab	Jessica Morden	16,370	42.5%	9,009	16,370	6,487	7,361	2,239	2,045	2,092	1,937	38,531	50.2%
Newport West and Islwyn	Lab	Lab	Ruth Jones	17,409	41.5%	8,868	17,409	6,710	8,541	3,529	2,087	2,078	1,597	41,951	55.4%
Pontypridd	Lab	Lab	Alex Davies-Jones	16,225	41.2%	8,402	16,225	3,775	7,823	5,275	1,606	1,865	2,809	39,378	51.8%
Rhondda and Ogmore	Lab	Lab	Chris Bryant	17,118	47.8%	7,790	17,118	2,050	9,328	5,198	935	1,177	—N/a	35,806	48.1%
Swansea West	Lab	Lab	Torsten Bell	14,761	41.4%	8,515	14,761	3,536	6,246	4,105	4,367	2,305	337	35,657	48.0%
Torfaen	Lab	Lab	Nick Thomas-Symonds	15,176	42.5%	7,322	15,176	5,737	7,854	2,571	1,644	1,705	1,018	35,705	49.8%
Vale of Glamorgan	Con	Lab	Kanishka Narayan	17,740	38.7%	4,216	17,740	13,524	6,973	3,245	1,612	1,881	851	45,826	61.5%
Wrexham	Con	Lab	Andrew Ranger	15,836	39.2%	5,948	15,836	9,888	6,915	4,138	1,777	1,339	480	40,373	57.4%
Ynys Môn	Con	PC	Llinos Medi	10,590	32.5%	637	7,619	9,953	3,223	10,590	439	604	200	32,628	61.4%
All constituencies							487,636	240,003	223,018	194,811	85,911	61,662	35,919	1,319,076	56.0%
All constituencies							37.0%	18.2%	16.9%	14.8%	6.5%	4.7%	2.7%	100.0%	
All constituencies							Seats								
All constituencies							27	0	0	4	1	0	0	32	
All constituencies							84%	0%	0%	13%	3.2%	0%	0%	100.0%	

== Candidates by constituency ==
Candidates in bold won their respective constituency election. Bold meant the candidate was elected.

Constituency	Conservative	Labour	Liberal Democrats	Reform UK	Green Party	Plaid Cymru	Others	Incumbent	
Aberafan Maesteg	Abigail Mainon	**Stephen Kinnock**	Justin Griffiths	Mark Griffiths	Nigel Hill	Colin Deere	Captain Beany (Independent); Rhiannon Morrissey (Heritage)	Labour	Stephen Kinnock (Aberavon)
Alyn and Deeside	Jeremy Kent	**Mark Tami**	Richard Marbrow	Vicky Roskams	Karl Macnaughton	Jack Morris	Edwin Duggan (Independent)	Labour	Mark Tami
Bangor Aberconwy	Robin Millar	**Claire Hughes**	Rachael Roberts	John Clark	Petra Haig	Catrin Wager	Kathrine Jones (Socialist Labour); Steve Marshall (Climate)	Conservative	Robin Millar (Aberconwy)
Blaenau Gwent and Rhymney	Hannah Jarvis	**Nick Smith**	Jackie Charlton		Anne Baker	Niamh Salkeld	Robert Griffiths (CPB); Yas Iqbal (Workers); Mike Whatley (Independent)	Labour	Nick Smith (Blaenau Gwent)
Brecon, Radnor and Cwm Tawe	Fay Jones	Matthew Dorrance	**David Chadwick**	Adam Hill	Amerjit Kaur-Dhaliwal	Emily Durrant-Munro	Jonathan Harrington (Abolish); Lady Lily the Pink (Monster Raving Loony)	Conservative	Fay Jones (Brecon and Radnorshire)
Bridgend	Anita Boateng	**Chris Elmore**	Claire Waller	Caroline Jones	Debra Cooper	Iolo Caudy	Mark John (Independent)	Conservative	Jamie Wallis
Bridgend	Anita Boateng	**Chris Elmore**	Claire Waller	Caroline Jones	Debra Cooper	Iolo Caudy	Mark John (Independent)	Labour	Chris Elmore (Ogmore)
Caerfyrddin	Simon Hart	Martha O'Neil	Nick Beckett	Bernard Holton	Will Beasley	**Ann Davies**	Nancy Cole (Women's Equality); David Evans (Workers)	Independent (formerly Plaid Cymru)	Jonathan Edwards (Carmarthen East and Dinefwr)
Caerphilly	Brandon Gorman	**Chris Evans** (Note: Incumbent MP for Islwyn)	Steve Aicheler	Joshua Kim	Mark Thomas	Lindsay Whittle (Note: Was member of the Welsh Assembly for South Wales East from 2011 to 2016)		Labour	Wayne David
Cardiff East	Beatrice Brandon	**Jo Stevens**	Rodney Berman	Lee Canning	Sam Coates	Cadewyn Skelley	John Williams (TUSC)	Labour	Jo Stevens (Cardiff Central)
Cardiff North	Joel Williams	**Anna McMorrin**	Irfan Latif	Lawrence Gwynn	Meg Shepherd-Foster	Malcolm Phillips		Labour	Anna McMorrin
Cardiff South and Penarth	Ellis Smith	**Stephen Doughty**	Alex Wilson	Simon Llewellyn	Anthony Slaughter	withdrew support from their nominated candidate	Sharifah Rahman (nominated as Plaid Cymru)	Labour	Stephen Doughty
Cardiff West	James Hamblin	**Alex Barros-Curtis**	Manda Rigby	Peter Hopkins	Jess Ryan	Kiera Marshall	Neil McEvoy (Propel); John Urquhart (Independent); Sean Wesley (Heritage)	Labour	Kevin Brennan
Ceredigion Preseli	Aled Thomas	Jackie Jones (Note: An MEP for Wales (2019–2020))	Mark Williams (Note: Was MP for Ceredigion (2005–2017))	Karl Pollard	Tomos Barlow	**Ben Lake**	Taghrid Al-Mawed (Workers)	Plaid Cymru	Ben Lake (Ceredigion)
Clwyd East	James Davies	**Becky Gittins**	Alec Dauncey	Kirsty Walmsley	Lee Lavery	Paul Penlington	Rob Roberts (Independent)	Independent (formerly Conservative)	Rob Roberts (Delyn)
Clwyd North	Darren Millar	**Gill German**	David Wilkins	Jamie Orange	Martyn Hogg	Paul Rowlinson		Conservative	David Jones (Clwyd West)
Clwyd North	Darren Millar	**Gill German**	David Wilkins	Jamie Orange	Martyn Hogg	Paul Rowlinson		Conservative	James Davies (Vale of Clwyd)
Dwyfor Meirionnydd	Tomos Day	Joanna Stallard	Phoebe Jenkins	Lucy Murphy	Karl Drinkwater	**Liz Saville Roberts**	Joan Ginsberg (Heritage)	Plaid Cymru	Liz Saville Roberts
Dwyfor Meirionnydd	Tomos Day	Joanna Stallard	Phoebe Jenkins	Lucy Murphy	Karl Drinkwater	**Liz Saville Roberts**	Joan Ginsberg (Heritage)	Plaid Cymru	Hywel Williams (Arfon)
Gower	Marc Jenkins	**Tonia Antoniazzi**	Franck Banza	Catrin Thomas	Chris Evans	Kieran Pritchard	Wayne Erasmus (Independent)	Labour	Tonia Antoniazzi
Llanelli	Charlie Evans	**Nia Griffith**	Chris Passmore	Gareth Beer	Karen Laurence	Rhodri Davies	Stan Robinson (UKIP)	Labour	Nia Griffith
Merthyr Tydfil and Aberdare	Amanda Jenner	**Gerald Jones**	Jade Smith	Gareth Thomas	David Griffin	Francis Whitefoot	Anthony Cole (Workers); Bob Davenport (CPB); Lorenzo de Gregori (Independent)	Labour	Gerald Jones (Merthyr Tydfil and Rhymney)
Merthyr Tydfil and Aberdare	Amanda Jenner	**Gerald Jones**	Jade Smith	Gareth Thomas	David Griffin	Francis Whitefoot	Anthony Cole (Workers); Bob Davenport (CPB); Lorenzo de Gregori (Independent)	Labour	Beth Winter (Note: Was not reselected as a candidate) (Cynon Valley)
Mid and South Pembrokeshire	Stephen Crabb	**Henry Tufnell**	Alistair Cameron	Stuart Marchant	James Purchase	Cris Tomos	Hanna Andersen (Women's Equality); Vusi Siphika (Independent)	Conservative	Simon Hart (Carmarthen West and South Pembrokeshire)
Mid and South Pembrokeshire	Stephen Crabb	**Henry Tufnell**	Alistair Cameron	Stuart Marchant	James Purchase	Cris Tomos	Hanna Andersen (Women's Equality); Vusi Siphika (Independent)	Conservative	Stephen Crabb (Preseli Pembrokeshire)
Monmouthshire	David TC Davies	**Catherine Fookes**	William Powell	Max Windsor-Peplow	Ian Chandler	Ioan Bellin	June Davies (True and Fair); Owen Lewis (Independent); Emma Meredith (Heritage)	Conservative	David TC Davies (Monmouth)
Montgomeryshire and Glyndŵr	withdrew support from their nominated candidate	**Steve Witherden**	Glyn Preston	Oliver Lewis	Jeremy Brignell-Thorp	Elwyn Vaughan	Craig Williams (nominated as Conservative)	Conservative	Craig Williams (Montgomeryshire)
Montgomeryshire and Glyndŵr	withdrew support from their nominated candidate	**Steve Witherden**	Glyn Preston	Oliver Lewis	Jeremy Brignell-Thorp	Elwyn Vaughan	Craig Williams (nominated as Conservative)	Conservative	Simon Baynes (Note: Baynes was the incumbent MP for Clwyd South in Wales, and stood in North Shropshire in England.) (Clwyd South)
Neath and Swansea East	Samantha Chohan	**Carolyn Harris** (Note: Incumbent MP for Swansea East)	Helen Clarke	Dai Richards	Jan Dowden	Andrew Jenkins		Labour	Christina Rees (Neath)
Newport East	Rachel Buckler	**Jessica Morden**	John Miller	Tommy Short	Lauren James	Jonathan Clark	Pippa Bartolotti (Independent); Mike Ford (Heritage)	Labour	Jessica Morden
Newport West and Islwyn	Nick Jones	**Ruth Jones**	Mike Hamilton	Paul Taylor	Kerry Vosper	Brandon Ham	George Etheridge (Independent)	Labour	Chris Evans (Islwyn)
Newport West and Islwyn	Nick Jones	**Ruth Jones**	Mike Hamilton	Paul Taylor	Kerry Vosper	Brandon Ham	George Etheridge (Independent)	Labour	Ruth Jones (Newport West)
Pontypridd	Jack Robson	**Alex Davies-Jones**	David Mathias	Steve Bayliss	Angela Karadog	Wil Rees	Joe Biddulph (Independent); Jonathan Bishop (Independent); Wayne Owen (Independent)	Labour	Alex Davies-Jones
Rhondda and Ogmore	Adam Robinson	**Chris Bryant**	Gerald Francis	Darren James	Christine Glossop	Owen Cutler		Labour	Chris Bryant (Rhondda)
Swansea West	Tara-Jane Sutcliffe	**Torsten Bell**	Michael O'Carroll	Patrick Benham-Crosswell	Peter Jones	Gwyn Williams	Gareth Bromhall (TUSC)	Independent (formerly Labour)	Geraint Davies
Swansea West	Tara-Jane Sutcliffe	**Torsten Bell**	Michael O'Carroll	Patrick Benham-Crosswell	Peter Jones	Gwyn Williams	Gareth Bromhall (TUSC)	Labour	Carolyn Harris (Swansea East)
Torfaen	Nathan Edmunds	**Nick Thomas-Symonds**	Brendan Roberts	Ian Williams	Philip Davies	Matthew Jones	Nikki Brooke (Heritage); Lee Dunning (Independent)	Labour	Nick Thomas-Symonds
Vale of Glamorgan	Alun Cairns	**Kanishka Narayan**	Steven Rajam	Toby Rhodes-Matthews	Lynden Mack	Ian Johnson	Stuart Field (Abolish); Steven Sluman (Independent)	Conservative	Alun Cairns
Wrexham	Sarah Atherton	**Andrew Ranger**	Tim Sly	Charles Dodman	Tim Morgan	Becca Martin	Paul Ashton (Abolish)	Conservative	Sarah Atherton
Ynys Môn	Virginia Crosbie	Ieuan Môn Williams	Leena Farhat	Emmett Jenner	Martin Schwaller	**Llinos Medi**	Sir Grumpus L Shorticus (Monster Raving Loony); Sam Wood (Libertarian)	Conservative	Virginia Crosbie

== Opinion polling ==
The dates for these opinion polls range from the 2019 general election on 12 December to the present day.

=== Poll results ===
Graph of opinion polls conducted in Wales

Dates conducted	Pollster	Client	Sample size	Lab	Con	PC	LD	Ref	Grn	Others	Lead
4 Jul 2024	2024 general election		–	37.0%	18.2%	14.8%	6.5%	16.9%	4.7%	1.9%	18.8
27 Jun – 1 Jul 2024	YouGov	Barn Cymru	1,072	40%	16%	14%	7%	16%	5%	2%	24
24–28 Jun 2024	More in Common	N/A	848	42%	22%	9%	4%	14%	5%	4%	20
19–20 Jun 2024	Redfield & Wilton	N/A	930	46%	15%	10%	7%	17%	4%	1%	29
14–18 Jun 2024	Savanta	N/A	1,026	49%	19%	12%	5%	12%	3%	-	30
5–7 Jun 2024	Redfield & Wilton	N/A	960	45%	18%	11%	5%	18%	4%	0%	27
30 May – 3 Jun 2024	YouGov	Barn Cymru	1,066	45%	18%	12%	5%	13%	4%	1%	27
22–27 May 2024	More in Common	N/A	805	45%	21%	13%	4%	12%	3%	1%	24
22 May 2024	Rishi Sunak announces that a general election will be held on 4 July 2024										
18–19 May 2024	Redfield & Wilton	N/A	900	43%	19%	14%	3%	15%	6%	1%	24
22–23 Apr 2024	Redfield & Wilton	N/A	840	40%	18%	14%	6%	18%	4%	0%	22
23–24 Mar 2024	Redfield & Wilton	N/A	878	49%	16%	10%	5%	15%	5%	1%	33
20 Mar 2024	Vaughan Gething becomes First Minister of Wales										
18 Feb 2024	Redfield & Wilton	N/A	874	45%	22%	10%	5%	13%	5%	1%	23
24–26 Jan 2024	Redfield & Wilton	N/A	1,100	48%	20%	10%	4%	12%	4%	1%	28
10–11 Dec 2023	Redfield & Wilton	N/A	1,086	47%	22%	11%	6%	10%	2%	0%	25
4–7 Dec 2023	YouGov	Barn Cymru	1,004	42%	20%	15%	7%	12%	3%	1%	22
12–13 Nov 2023	Redfield & Wilton	N/A	1,100	44%	24%	13%	4%	9%	5%	1%	20
14–15 Oct 2023	Redfield & Wilton	N/A	959	46%	26%	10%	3%	10%	4%	0%	20
16–17 Sep 2023	Redfield & Wilton	N/A	1,172	44%	22%	10%	9%	7%	6%	1%	22
1–6 Sep 2023	YouGov	Barn Cymru	1,051	50%	19%	12%	5%	8%	5%	2%	31
13–14 Aug 2023	Redfield & Wilton	N/A	1,068	41%	24%	13%	7%	11%	4%	0%	17
14–16 Jul 2023	Redfield & Wilton	N/A	1,050	46%	24%	10%	7%	10%	3%	1%	22
17–18 Jun 2023	Redfield & Wilton	N/A	1,000	43%	22%	10%	7%	12%	4%	1%	21
16 Jun 2023	Rhun ap Iorwerth becomes leader of Plaid Cymru										
12–17 May 2023	YouGov	Barn Cymru	1,064	49%	19%	10%	8%	9%	4%	1%	30
14–15 May 2023	Redfield & Wilton	N/A	1,058	43%	23%	11%	8%	9%	4%	1%	20
15–17 Apr 2023	Redfield & Wilton	N/A	1,251	44%	24%	12%	7%	9%	4%	0%	20
17–23 Feb 2023	YouGov	WalesOnline	1,083	53%	19%	12%	4%	8%	3%	1%	34
3–7 Feb 2023	YouGov	Barn Cymru	1,081	49%	20%	14%	5%	9%	3%	1%	29
25 Nov – 1 Dec 2022	YouGov	Barn Cymru	1,042	51%	18%	13%	4%	8%	4%	2%	33
30 Sep – 4 Oct 2022	Survation	38 Degrees	6,012	51%	24%	13%	6%	–	–	6%	27
20–22 Sep 2022	YouGov	Barn Cymru	1,014	46%	23%	15%	5%	5%	3%	3%	23
12–16 Jun 2022	YouGov	Barn Cymru	1,020	41%	26%	16%	7%	4%	4%	2%	15
5 May 2022	Local elections held in Wales										
25 Feb – 1 Mar 2022	YouGov	Barn Cymru	1,086	41%	26%	13%	7%	6%	4%	3%	15
13–16 Dec 2021	YouGov	Barn Cymru	1,009	41%	26%	13%	3%	7%	6%	3%	15
27 Sep – 1 Oct 2021	YouGov	?	?	39%	29%	17%	3%	5%	–	7%	10
13–16 Sep 2021	YouGov	ITV Cymru Wales/Cardiff University	1,071	37%	31%	15%	4%	6%	5%	2%	6
6 May 2021	Election to the Senedd										
2–4 May 2021	YouGov	ITV Cymru Wales/Cardiff University	1,071	37%	36%	14%	3%	4%	3%	3%	1
18–21 Apr 2021	YouGov	ITV Cymru Wales/Cardiff University	1,142	37%	33%	18%	2%	3%	4%	3%	4
9–19 Apr 2021	Opinium	Sky News	2,005	42%	33%	14%	3%	–	3%	5% UKIP on 3% Other on 2%	9
16–19 Mar 2021	YouGov	ITV Cymru Wales/Cardiff University	1,174	35%	35%	17%	4%	2%	3%	3%	Tie
24 Jan 2021	Andrew RT Davies becomes leader of the Welsh Conservatives										
11–14 Jan 2021	YouGov	ITV Cymru Wales/Cardiff University	1,018	36%	33%	17%	3%	5%	4%	2%	3
26–30 Oct 2020	YouGov	ITV Cymru Wales/Cardiff University	1,013	43%	32%	13%	3%	5%	3%	2%	11
28 Aug – 4 Sep 2020	YouGov	ITV Cymru Wales/Cardiff University	1,110	41%	33%	15%	2%	4%	3%	2%	8
29 May – 1 Jun 2020	YouGov	ITV Cymru Wales/Cardiff University	1,021	39%	35%	15%	5%	2%	3%	1%	4
3–7 Apr 2020	YouGov	ITV Cymru Wales/Cardiff University	1,008	34%	46%	11%	4%	3%	2%	0%	12
20–26 Jan 2020	YouGov	ITV Cymru Wales/Cardiff University	1,037	36%	41%	13%	5%	3%	2%	1%	5
12 Dec 2019	2019 general election		–	40.9%	36.1%	9.9%	6.0%	5.4%	1.0%	0.7%	4.8

=== Seat projections ===
Dates conducted	Pollster	Sample size	Lab.	Con.	PC	LD	Notes
20 Oct 2022	People Polling	1,237	35	0	4	1	Based on 40 seats. Seats were reduced to 32.
12 Dec 2019	2019 general election	–	22	14	4	0	

== Analysis ==
The Labour Party remained the largest party in Wales, winning 27 of the 32 seats. In addition to defending all of their seats in the south including around Cardiff and Swansea, Labour reversed many of the Conservative gains in 2019, gaining seats such as Bangor Aberconwy, Clwyd East, Clwyd North, Monmouthshire and Wrexham. Labour also won in Montgomeryshire and Glyndŵr, which covers Montgomeryshire, the only area in Wales which had, until 2024, never elected a Labour MP. Of the Labour MPs elected, 2 of them are also members of the Co-operative Party. They are designated as Labour-Co-op, but generally just counted in Labour's total.

Plaid Cymru won four seats, the same as in 2019, however given boundary changes and the reduction in seats this should be counted as two gains. Plaid Cymru defended Dwyfor Meirionnydd and Ceredigion Preseli with significant majorities, gaining the new seat of Caerfyrddin which had been nominally Conservative in 2019, and gained Ynys Môn from the Conservatives. This was the first time Plaid Cymru had won in Ynys Môn since 2001; it was the most marginal seat in Wales with a majority of 637 votes between Plaid and Conservatives, with Labour in close third place. By the share of the vote (14.8 per cent), Plaid Cymru achieved their best ever result in UK general election.

The Liberal Democrats gained one seat in Wales, Brecon, Radnor and Cwm Tawe. Outside of briefly holding the predecessor seat following the 2019 Brecon and Radnorshire by-election, the Liberal Democrats have not had a seat in Wales since losing Ceredigion in 2017.

The Conservative Party lost every seat in Wales, having won fourteen seats in 2019, the first time since 2001 that Wales had no Conservative MPs. This was despite the Conservatives taking 18.2% of the overall vote and outpolling both Plaid Cymru and the Liberal Democrats in terms of votes. The Conservatives had also previously held no seats in Wales in the 1906 and 1997 general elections.

Reform UK was the third largest party in terms of votes with 16.9%, nearly as many votes as the Conservatives and more than both Plaid Cymru and the Liberal Democrats; it was also a higher vote share than in England. Reform was the runner-up in thirteen constituencies, coming closest to winning in Llanelli. The Green Party was runner-up in one constituency, Cardiff South and Penarth.

== See also ==
- 2024 United Kingdom general election in England
- 2024 United Kingdom general election in Scotland
- 2024 United Kingdom general election in Northern Ireland
- 2026 Senedd election
- List of MPs for constituencies in Wales (2024–present)
- List of marginal seats before the 2024 United Kingdom general election
