= List of MPs for constituencies in Wales (2024–present) =

- Colours on map indicate the party allegiance of each constituency's MP on the day of the 2024 UK election

This is a list of members of Parliament (MPs) elected to the House of Commons of the United Kingdom by Welsh constituencies for the fifty-ninth Parliament of the United Kingdom (2024–present).

It includes MPs elected at the 2024 general election, held on 4 July 2024.

The number of constituencies in Wales was reduced from 40 to 32 at this election. The Conservative Party representation in Wales was wiped out.

== Composition ==
| Affiliation | Members |
|---|---|
| Labour Party | 27 |
| Plaid Cymru | 4 |
| Liberal Democrats | 1 |
| Total | 32 |

Number of seats by party (at 2024 UK election)
1. Labour (84.0%)
2. Plaid Cymru (13.0%)
3. Liberal Democrats (3.00%)

== MPs ==
| MP | Constituency | Party | In constituency since | Majority | Majority (%) |
|---|---|---|---|---|---|
| Tonia Antoniazzi | Gower | Labour | 2017 | 11,567 | 24.5 |
| Alex Barros-Curtis | Cardiff West | Labour | 2024 | 7,019 | 15.6 |
| Torsten Bell | Swansea West | Labour | 2024 | 8,515 | 23.9 |
| Chris Bryant | Rhondda and Ogmore | Labour | 2024 (Note: Bryant was formerly MP for Rhondda since 2001) | 7,790 | 21.7 |
| David Chadwick | Brecon, Radnor and Cwm Tawe | Liberal Democrats | 2024 | 1,472 | 3.2 |
| Ann Davies | Caerfyrddin | Plaid Cymru | 2024 | 4,505 | 9.9 |
| Alex Davies-Jones | Pontypridd | Labour | 2019 | 8,402 | 21.3 |
| Stephen Doughty | Cardiff South and Penarth | Labour Co-op | 2012 | 11,767 | 30.0 |
| Chris Elmore | Bridgend | Labour Co-op | 2024 (Note: Elmore was formerly MP for Ogmore since 2016) | 8,595 | 20.8 |
| Chris Evans | Caerphilly | Labour Co-op | 2024 (Note: Evans was formerly MP for Islwyn since 2010) | 6,419 | 16.8 |
| Catherine Fookes | Monmouthshire | Labour | 2024 | 3,338 | 6.5 |
| Gill German | Clwyd North | Labour | 2024 | 1,196 | 2.8 |
| Becky Gittins | Clwyd East | Labour | 2024 | 4,622 | 9.7 |
| Nia Griffith | Llanelli | Labour | 2005 | 1,504 | 3.7 |
| Carolyn Harris | Neath and Swansea East | Labour | 2024 (Note: Harris was formerly MP for Swansea East since 2015) | 6,627 | 16.5 |
| Claire Hughes | Bangor Aberconwy | Labour | 2024 | 4,896 | 11.7 |
| Gerald Jones | Merthyr Tydfil and Aberdare | Labour | 2024 (Note: Jones was formerly MP for Merthyr Tydfil and Rhymney since 2015) | 7,447 | 21.1 |
| Ruth Jones | Newport West and Islwyn | Labour | 2024 (Note: Jones was formerly MP for Newport West since 2019) | 8,868 | 21.1 |
| Stephen Kinnock | Aberafan Maesteg | Labour | 2024 (Note: Kinnock was formerly MP for Aberavon since 2015) | 10,354 | 29.0 |
| Ben Lake | Ceredigion Preseli | Plaid Cymru | 2024 (Note: Lake was formerly MP for Ceredigion since 2017) | 14,789 | 31.9 |
| Anna McMorrin | Cardiff North | Labour | 2017 | 11,207 | 23.6 |
| Llinos Medi | Ynys Môn | Plaid Cymru | 2024 | 637 | 2.0 |
| Jessica Morden | Newport East | Labour | 2005 | 9,009 | 23.4 |
| Kanishka Narayan | Vale of Glamorgan | Labour | 2024 | 4,216 | 9.2 |
| Andrew Ranger | Wrexham | Labour | 2024 | 5,948 | 14.7 |
| Liz Saville Roberts | Dwyfor Meirionnydd | Plaid Cymru | 2015 | 15,876 | 39.3 |
| Nick Smith | Blaenau Gwent and Rhymney | Labour | 2024 (Note: Smith was formerly MP for Blaenau Gwent since 2010) | 12,183 | 40.7 |
| Jo Stevens | Cardiff East | Labour | 2024 (Note: Stevens was formerly MP for Cardiff Central since 2015) | 9,097 | 23.3 |
| Mark Tami | Alyn and Deeside | Labour | 2001 | 8,794 | 11.6 |
| Nick Thomas-Symonds | Torfaen | Labour | 2015 | 7,322 | 20.5 |
| Henry Tufnell | Mid and South Pembrokeshire | Labour | 2024 | 1,878 | 4.0 |
| Steve Witherden | Montgomeryshire and Glyndŵr | Labour | 2024 | 3,815 | 8.8 |

== See also ==
- 2024 United Kingdom general election in Wales
- List of MPs elected in the 2024 United Kingdom general election
- List of MPs for constituencies in Scotland (2024–present)
