= 2019 United Kingdom general election in Wales =

United Kingdom general election held in Wales

- 12 December 2019

All 40 Welsh seats to the House of Commons
- Turnout: 66.6% (▼2.0%)
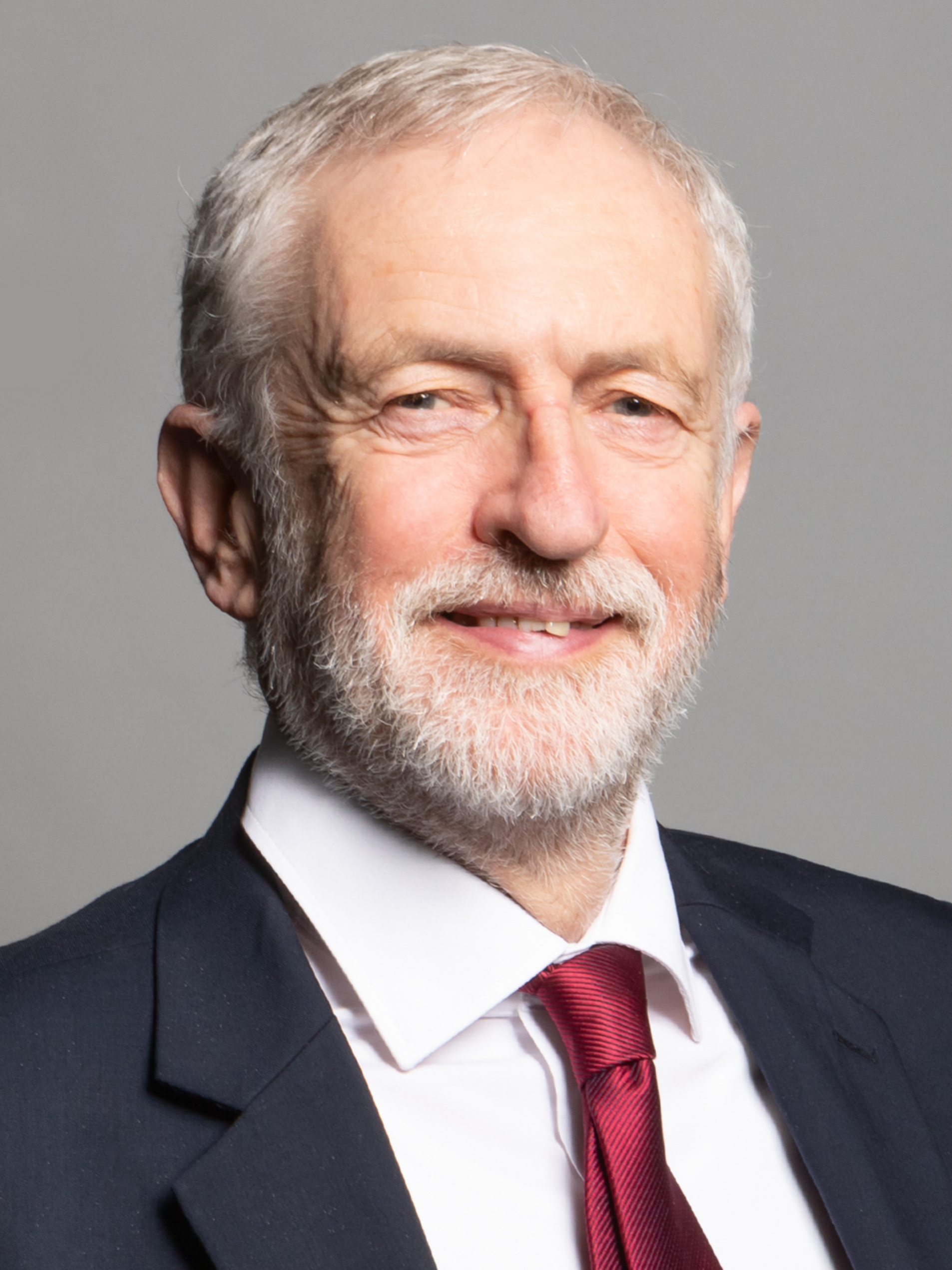

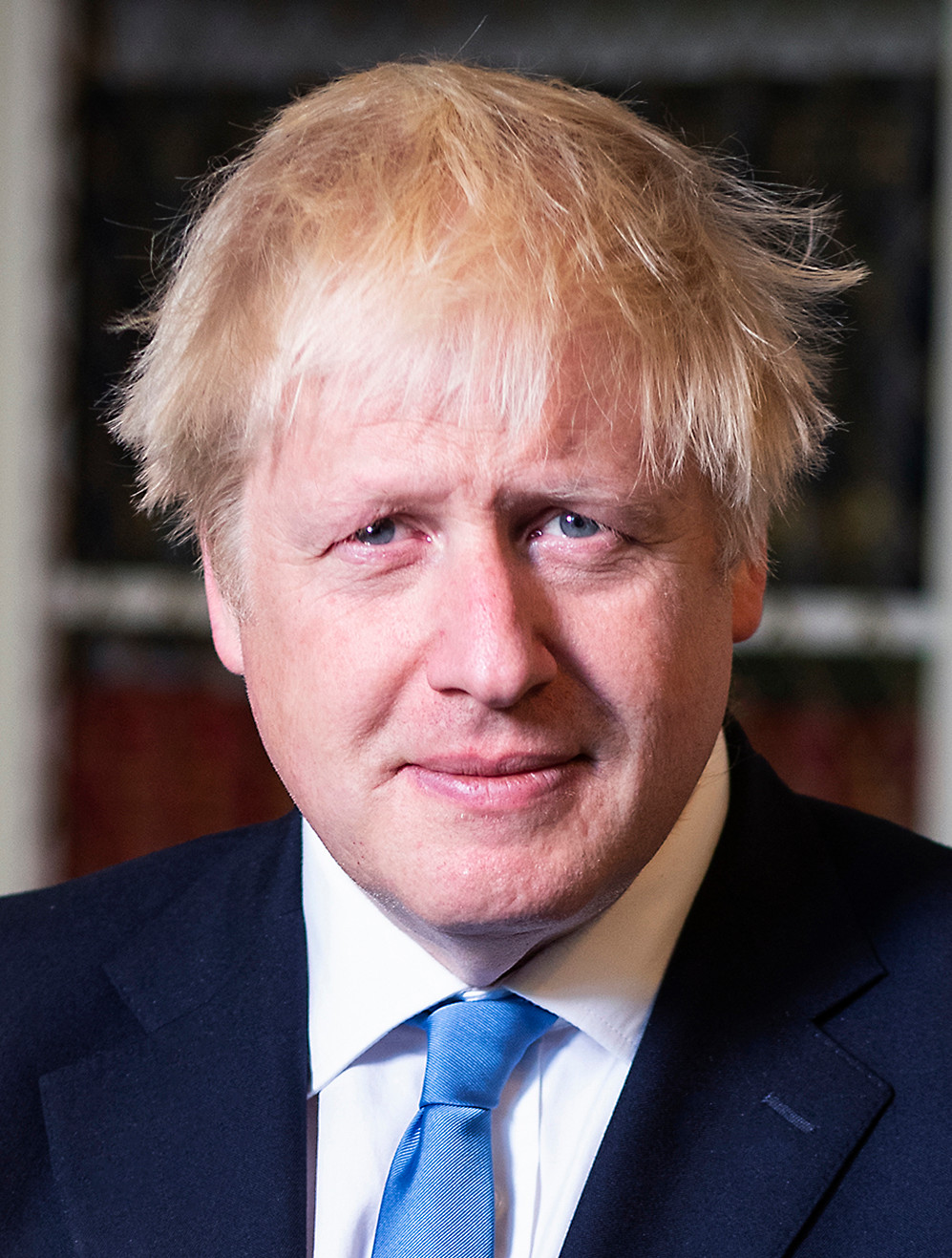

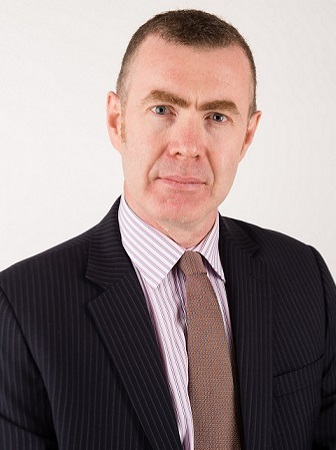

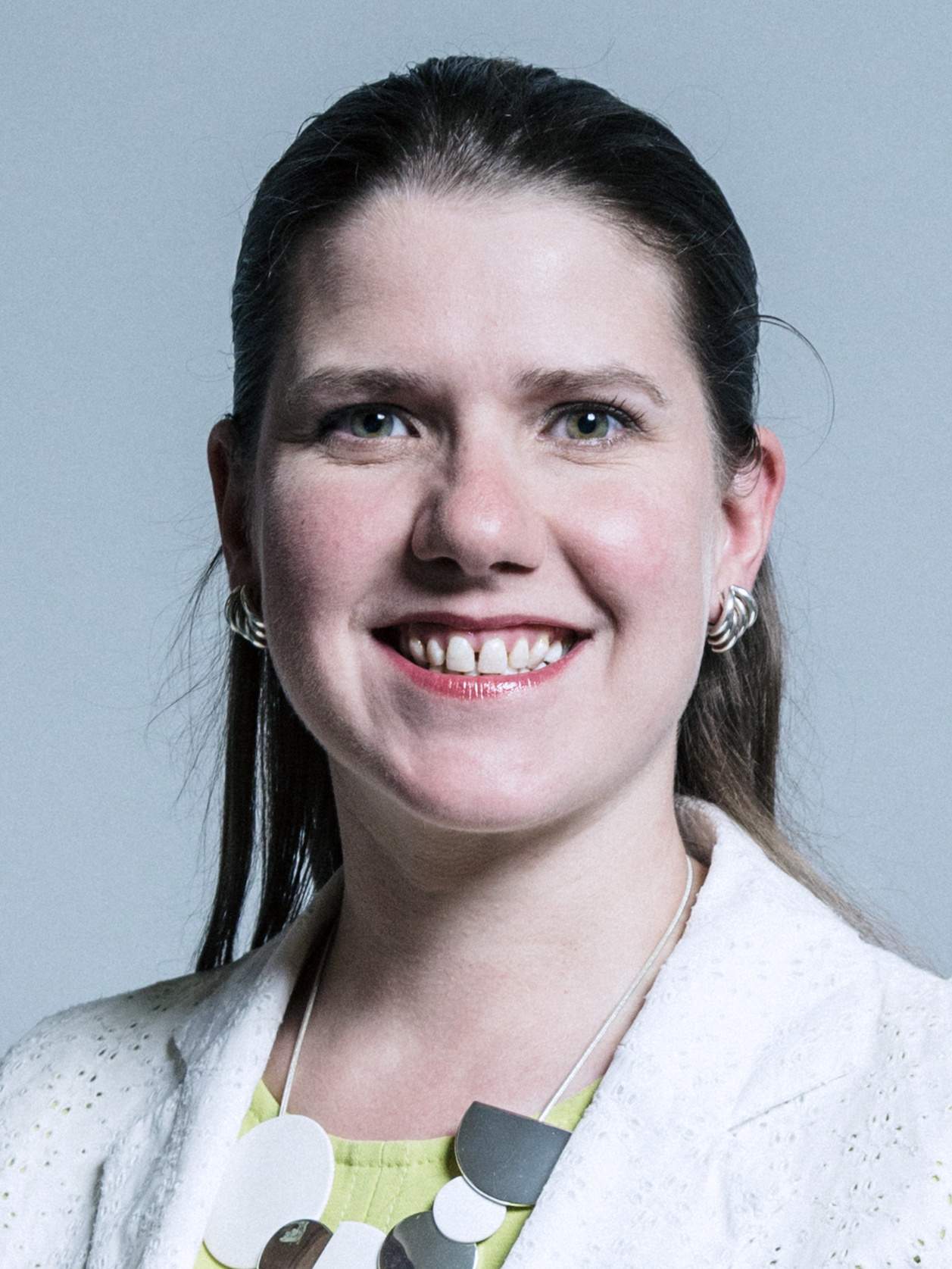
	First party	Second party
Leader	Jeremy Corbyn	Boris Johnson
Party	Labour	Conservative
Leader since	12 September 2015	23 July 2019
Leader's seat	Islington North	Uxbridge and South Ruislip
Last election	28 seats, 48.9%	8 seats, 33.6%
Seats before	28	8
Seats won	22	14
Seat change	▼6	▲6
Popular vote	632,035	557,234
Percentage	40.9%	36.1%
Swing	▼8.0 pp	▲2.5 pp
	Third party	Fourth party
Leader	Adam Price	Jo Swinson
Party	Plaid Cymru	Liberal Democrats
Leader since	28 September 2018	22 July 2019
Leader's seat	Did not stand	East Dunbartonshire (lost seat)
Last election	4 seats, 10.4%	0 seats, 4.5%
Seats before	4	0
Seats won	4	0
Seat change	Steady	Steady
Popular vote	153,265	92,171
Percentage	9.9%	6.0%
Swing	▼0.5 pp	▲1.5 pp
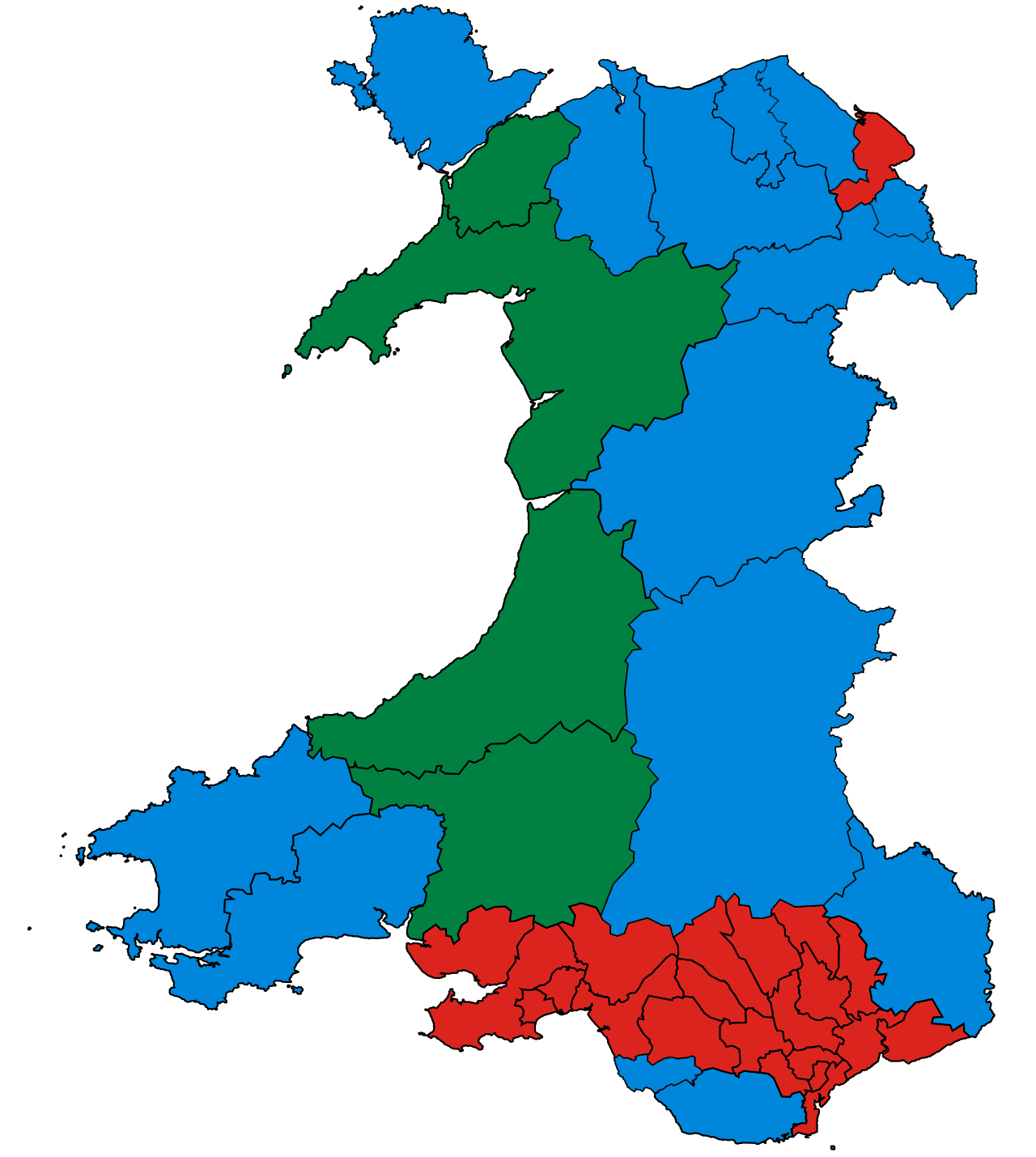

On 12 December 2019, the 2019 United Kingdom general election was held in Wales, to elect all 650 members of the House of Commons, across the 40 Welsh constituencies.

The Labour Party won the most votes and seats in Wales, but the Conservative Party made gains in Wales and won across the UK.

Compared to the 2017 general election, Labour lost six seats, each of which was won by the Conservatives. The Conservative Party had its best results in Wales since the 1983 general election at 14 seats. This reflected a decrease in vote share of 8% from the Labour Party, matched by increases in vote share for the Brexit Party and Conservative Party of 5.4% and 2.5%, respectively. However, the Labour Party remained the party receiving the most votes, with a 40.9% vote share. Having gained Brecon and Radnorshire in the 2019 Brecon and Radnorshire by-election earlier in the year, the Welsh Liberal Democrats lost to the Conservatives. Plaid Cymru retained its four seats. The party did not make any gains, and its total vote share was down 0.5%.

Overall, 1,544,357 votes were cast in Wales, reflecting a turnout of 66.6% of the electorate.

== Electoral system ==
MPs are elected in 40 Single Member constituencies by the first-past-the-post system.

== History and background ==
The election was called on 29 October 2019, when its date was fixed as 12 December.

In the European Elections in Wales of June 2019, the Brexit Party, newly formed, had taken 32.5% of the votes and won two seats, Plaid Cymru had come second with 20% and one MEP, Jill Evans, and Labour had finished third, with 15.3% and also one MEP, Jackie Jones.

In the run-up to the general election, the Conservative party suspended the whip of one of its MPs, Guto Bebb of Aberconwy, who then sat as an independent until the end of the parliament and did not seek re-election. Additionally, the Conservative party lost a by-election in Brecon and Radnorshire to the Liberal Democrats. Before the election, the numbers were 28 Labour MPs, six Conservative, four Plaid, one Liberal Democrat, and one Independent (Bebb).

Plaid Cymru had gained one seat in the previous election. The party was for stopping Brexit and holding a second referendum on the Brexit withdrawal agreement, which was at odds with how Wales had voted in the 2016 referendum. The party did not make any gains, and its total vote share was down 0.5%.

== Candidates ==
Below is a table summarising the candidates of the 2019 general election in Wales.

Affiliation	Candidates
Labour Party	40
Conservative and Unionist Party	40
Plaid Cymru	36
Liberal Democrats	32
Brexit Party	32
Green Party of England and Wales	18
Independent	9
Gwlad Gwlad	3
Social Democratic Party	2
The Cynon Valley Party	1
Official Monster Raving Loony Party	1
Christian Party	1
Socialist Party of Great Britain	1
Total	216

== Target seats ==
=== Labour ===
- Arfon, Plaid Cymru (Plaid hold)
- Preseli Pembrokeshire, Conservative (Conservative hold)

=== Plaid Cymru ===
- Ynys Môn, Labour (Conservative gain)
- Llanelli, Labour (Labour hold)

== Results ==
Party	Seats					Aggregate votes		
Party	Total	Gains	Losses	Net	Of all (%)	Total	Of all (%)	Change (%)
Labour	22	0	6	▼6	55.0	632,035	40.9	▼8.0
Conservative	14	6 (Note: Not including Brecon and Radnorshire and Aberconwy, which the Conservative Party won in 2017 but did not control when parliament was dissolved.)	0	▲6	35.0	557,234	36.1	▲2.5
Plaid Cymru	4	0	0	Steady	10.0	153,265	9.9	▼0.5
Liberal Democrats	0	0	0 (Note: Not including Brecon and Radnorshire, which the Liberal Democrats won in a 2019 by-election.)	Steady	—	92,171	6.0	▲1.5
Brexit Party	0	New			—	83,908	5.4	New
Green	0	0	0	Steady	—	15,828	1.0	▲0.7
Independent	0	0	0 (Note: Not including Aberconwy, previously controlled by the independent Guto Bebb who lost the Conservative Party whip in 2019.)	Steady	—	6,220	0.4	n/a
Gwlad Gwlad	0	New			—	1,515	0.1	New
Cynon Valley	0	New			—	1,322	0.1	New
Monster Raving Loony	0	0	0	Steady	—	345	0.0	Steady
Christian	0	Did not stand in 2017			—	245	0.0	—N/a (Note: Party entered candidates in the 2017 general election but not in any Welsh seats.)
SDP	0	Did not stand in 2017			—	181	0.0	—N/a
Socialist (GB)	0	0	0	Steady	—	88	0.0	Steady
Total	40			0	100.0	1,544,357	100.0	0.0
Registered voters, and turnout						2,318,507	66.6	▼2.0

Map of constituencies by winner vote share

Popular vote
Labour	40.9%
Conservative	36.1%
Plaid Cymru	9.9%
Liberal Democrats	6.0%
Brexit Party	5.0%
Greens	1.0%

Parliament seats
Labour	55%
Conservative	35%
Plaid Cymru	10%

=== Results by constituency ===
Constituency	County	2017 result	2019 winning party				Turnout	Votes							
Constituency	County	2017 result	Party	Votes	Share	Majority	Turnout	Lab	Con	PC	LD	Brx	Grn	Other	Total
Aberavon	WGM	Lab	Lab	17,008	53.8%	10,490	62.3%	17,008	6,518	2,711	1,072	3,108	450	731	31,598
Aberconwy	CON	Con	Con	14,687	46.1%	2,034	71.3%	12,653	14,687	2,704	1,821				31,865
Alyn and Deeside	CON	Lab	Lab	18,271	42.5%	213	68.5%	18,271	18,058	1,453	2,548	2,678			43,003
Arfon	GWN	PC	PC	13,134	45.2%	2,781	68.9%	10,353	4,428	13,134		1,159			29,074
Blaenau Gwent	GNT	Lab	Lab	14,862	49.2%	8,647	59.6%	14,862	5,749	1,722	1,285	6,215	386		30,219
Brecon and Radnorshire	POW	Con	Con	21,958	53.1%	7,131	74.5%	3,944	21,958		14,827			590	41,319
Bridgend	MGM	Lab	Con	18,193	43.1%	1,157	66.7%	17,036	18,193	2,013	2,368	1,811	815		42,236
Caerphilly	GNT	Lab	Lab	18,018	44.9%	6,833	63.5%	18,018	11,185	6,424		4,490			40,117
Cardiff Central	SGM	Lab	Lab	25,605	61.2%	17,179	65.3%	25,605	8,426		6,298	1,006		487	41,822
Cardiff North	SGM	Lab	Lab	26,064	49.5%	6,982	77.0%	26,064	19,082	1,606	3,580	1,311	820	203	52,666
Cardiff South and Penarth	SGM	Lab	Lab	27,382	54.1%	12,737	64.2%	27,382	14,645	2,386	2,985	1,999	1,182		50,579
Cardiff West	SGM	Lab	Lab	23,908	51.8%	10,986	67.4%	23,908	12,922	3,864	2,731	1,619	1,133		45,817
Carmarthen East and Dinefwr	DFD	PC	PC	15,939	38.9%	1,809	71.4%	8,622	14,130	15,939		2,311			40,456
Carmarthen West and South Pembrokeshire	DFD	Con	Con	22,183	52.7%	7,745	71.8%	14,438	22,183	3,633	1,860				42,114
Ceredigion	DFD	PC	PC	15,208	37.9%	6,329	71.3%	6,317	8,879	15,208	6,975	2,063	663		40,105
Clwyd South	CON	Lab	Con	16,222	44.7%	1,239	67.3%	14,983	16,222	2,137	1,496	1,468			36,306
Clwyd West	CON	Con	Con	20,403	50.7%	6,747	69.7%	13,656	20,403	3,907	2,237				40,203
Cynon Valley	MGM	Lab	Lab	15,533	51.4%	8,822	59.1%	15,533	6,711	2,562	949	3,045		1,436	30,236
Delyn	CON	Lab	Con	16,756	43.7%	865	70.3%	15,891	16,756	1,406	2,346	1,971			38,370
Dwyfor Meirionnydd	GWN	PC	PC	14,447	48.3%	4,740	67.5%	3,998	9,707	14,447		1,776			29,928
Gower	WGM	Lab	Lab	20,208	45.4%	1,837	72.0%	20,208	18,371	2,288	2,236	1,379			44,482
Islwyn	GNT	Lab	Lab	15,356	44.7%	5,464	62.0%	15,356	9,892	2,286	1,313	4,834	669		34,350
Llanelli	DFD	Lab	Lab	16,125	42.2%	4,670	63.2%	16,125	11,455	7,048		3,605			38,233
Merthyr Tydfil and Rhymney	GNT	Lab	Lab	16,913	52.4%	10,606	57.3%	16,913	6,307	2,446	1,116	3,604		1,860	32,246
Monmouth	GNT	Con	Con	26,160	52.1%	9,982	74.8%	16,178	26,160	1,182	4,909		1,353	435	50,217
Montgomeryshire	POW	Con	Con	20,020	58.5%	12,138	69.8%	5,585	20,020		7,882			727	34,241
Neath	WGM	Lab	Lab	15,920	43.3%	5,637	65.2%	15,920	10,283	4,495	1,485	3,184	728	661	36,756
Newport East	GNT	Lab	Lab	16,125	44.4%	1,992	62.0%	16,125	14,133	872	2,121	2,454	577		36,282
Newport West	GNT	Lab	Lab	18,977	43.7%	902	65.2%	18,977	18,075	1,187	2,565	1,727	902		43,433
Ogmore	MGM	Lab	Lab	17,602	49.7%	7,805	61.5%	17,602	9,797	2,919	1,460	2,991	621		35,390
Pontypridd	MGM	Lab	Lab	17,381	44.5%	5,887	64.7%	17,381	11,494	4,990		2,917		2,278	39,060
Preseli Pembrokeshire	DFD	Con	Con	21,381	50.4%	5,062	71.2%	16,319	21,381	2,776	1,943				42,419
Rhondda	MGM	Lab	Lab	16,115	54.4%	11,440	59.0%	16,115	4,675	4,069	612	3,733	438		29,642
Swansea East	WGM	Lab	Lab	17,405	51.8%	7,970	57.4%	17,405	9,435	1,905	1,409	2,842	583		33,579
Swansea West	WGM	Lab	Lab	18,493	51.6%	8,116	62.8%	18,493	10,377	1,984	2,993	1,983			35,830
Torfaen	GNT	Lab	Lab	15,546	41.8%	3,742	60.2%	15,546	11,804	1,441	1,831	5,742	812		37,176
Vale of Clwyd	CON	Lab	Con	17,270	46.4%	1,827	65.7%	15,443	17,270	1,552	1,471	1,477			37,213
Vale of Glamorgan	SGM	Con	Con	27,305	49.8%	3,562	71.6%	23,743	27,305				3,251	508	54,807
Wrexham	CON	Lab	Con	15,199	45.3%	2,131	67.4%	13,068	15,199	2,151	1,447	1,222	445		33,532
Ynys Môn	GWN	Lab	Con	12,959	35.5%	1,968	70.4%	10,991	12,959	10,418		2,184			36,552
Total for all constituencies							Turnout								Total
Total for all constituencies							Turnout	Lab	Con	PC	LD	Brx	Grn	Other	Total
Total for all constituencies							Turnout	Votes							
Total for all constituencies							66.6%	632,035	557,234	153,265	92,171	83,908	15,828	9,916	1,544,357
Total for all constituencies							66.6%	40.9%	36.1%	9.9%	6.0%	5.4%	1.0%	0.6%	100.0%
Total for all constituencies							66.6%	Seats							
Total for all constituencies							66.6%	22	14	4	0	0	0	0	40
Total for all constituencies							66.6%	55%	35%	10%	0%	0%	0%	0%	100.0%

== Opinion polling ==
(Includes polls in which polling concluded on or before: 31 May 2019)

Pollster/client(s)	Date(s) conducted	Sample size	Lab	Con	Plaid Cymru	Lib Dem	UKIP	Green	Change UK	Brexit	Other	Lead
2019 general election	12 Dec 2019	–	40.9%	36.1%	9.9%	6.0%	–	1.0%	–	5.4%	0.6%	4.8%
YouGov/ITV Cymru Wales/Cardiff University	22–25 Nov 2019	1,116	38%	32%	11%	9%	–	1%	–	8%	1%	6%
YouGov/ITV Cymru Wales/Cardiff University	31 Oct–4 Nov 2019	1,136	29%	28%	12%	12%	0%	3%	0%	15%	1%	1%
YouGov/ITV News	10–14 October 2019	1,071	25%	29%	12%	16%	—	4%	—	14%	1%	4%
	1 August 2019	Brecon and Radnorshire by-election										
YouGov/ITV Cymru Wales/Cardiff University	23–28 July 2019	1,071	22%	24%	15%	16%	—	3%	—	18%	1%	2%
YouGov/ITV Cymru Wales/Cardiff University	16–20 May 2019	1,009	25%	17%	13%	12%	1%	5%	2%	23%	2%	2%
YouGov/ITV Cymru Wales/Cardiff University	2–5 Apr 2019	1,025	33%	26%	15%	7%	3%	2%	9%	4%	1%	7%
	4 April 2019	Newport West by-election										
ICM/BBC Wales	7–23 Feb 2019	1,000	42%	33%	13%	6%	3%	1%	–	–	2%	9%
YouGov/ITV Cymru Wales/Cardiff University	19–22 Feb 2019	1,025	35%	29%	14%	8%	6%	3%	–	–	4%	6%
Sky Data/Cardiff University	7–14 Dec 2018	1,014	45%	32%	14%	3%	4%	2%	–	–	1%	13%
	6–13 Dec 2018	Mark Drakeford becomes leader of Welsh Labour and First Minister										
YouGov/ITV Cymru Wales/Cardiff University	4–7 Dec 2018	1,024	43%	31%	13%	6%	3%	3%	–	–	1%	12%
YouGov/ITV Cymru Wales/Cardiff University	30 Oct–2 Nov 2018	1,031	42%	33%	10%	7%	4%	2%	–	–	1%	9%
Survation/Channel 4	20 Oct–2 Nov 2018	1,177	47%	30%	13%	6%	3%	2%	–	–	0%	17%
	28 September 2018	Adam Price becomes leader of Plaid Cymru										
	6 September 2018	Paul Davies becomes leader of the Welsh Conservatives										
YouGov/ITV Cymru Wales/Cardiff University	28 Jun–2 Jul 2018	1,031	44%	31%	13%	5%	3%	2%	–	–	1%	13%
YouGov/ITV Cymru Wales/Cardiff University	12–15 Mar 2018	1,015	46%	33%	11%	4%	4%	2%	–	–	1%	13%
ICM/BBC Wales	8–25 Feb 2018	1,001	49%	32%	11%	5%	2%	1%	–	–	0%	17%
YouGov/ITV Cymru Wales/Cardiff University	21–24 Nov 2017	1,016	47%	31%	11%	5%	3%	2%	–	–	1%	16%
	3 November 2017	Jane Dodds becomes leader of the Welsh Liberal Democrats										
YouGov/ITV Cymru Wales/Cardiff University	4–7 Sep 2017	1,011	50%	32%	8%	4%	3%	1%	–	–	1%	18%
2017 general election	8 June 2017	–	48.9%	33.6%	10.4%	4.5%	2.0%	0.3%	–	–	0.2%	15.4%

== See also ==
- 2019 United Kingdom general election in England
- 2019 United Kingdom general election in Scotland
- 2019 United Kingdom general election in Northern Ireland
- List of MPs for constituencies in Wales (2019–2024)
