= Dai Havard =

British politician (born 1950)

Member of Parliament for Merthyr Tydfil and Rhymney
- In office 7 June 2001 – 30 March 2015
- Preceded by: Ted Rowlands
- Succeeded by: Gerald Jones
- Majority: 4,056 (12.6%)

Personal details
- Born: 7 February 1950 (age 76) Merthyr Tydfil, Glamorgan, Wales
- Party: Labour
- Education: Warwick University

David Stuart Havard (born 7 February 1950) is a British Labour Party politician who was the member of parliament (MP) for Merthyr Tydfil and Rhymney from 2001 to 2015.

== Career ==
Havard was a trade union researcher, education tutor, official and ultimately the Wales Secretary of the Manufacturing, Science and Finance (MSF) Union.

=== Member of Parliament ===
He claimed more than £205,000 in his expenses and wages between 2007 and 2008, which was revealed in May 2009.

He continued as a member of Unite the Union following his election to Parliament. During his time in Parliament, Havard was a member of the Regulatory Reform Committee (2001–2005) and the Defence Select Committee (2003–2015). He consistently voted against same sex marriage the most recent being February 2013, one month prior to the act coming into force which became an official law in July 2013.

Havard announced his decision to stand down as an MP at the following year's general election in September 2014, which he did so in March 2015.

Parliament of the United Kingdom
Preceded by Ted Rowlands	Member of Parliament for Merthyr Tydfil and Rhymney; 2001–2015	Succeeded by Gerald Jones
