= Guto Bebb =

Welsh politician (born 1968)

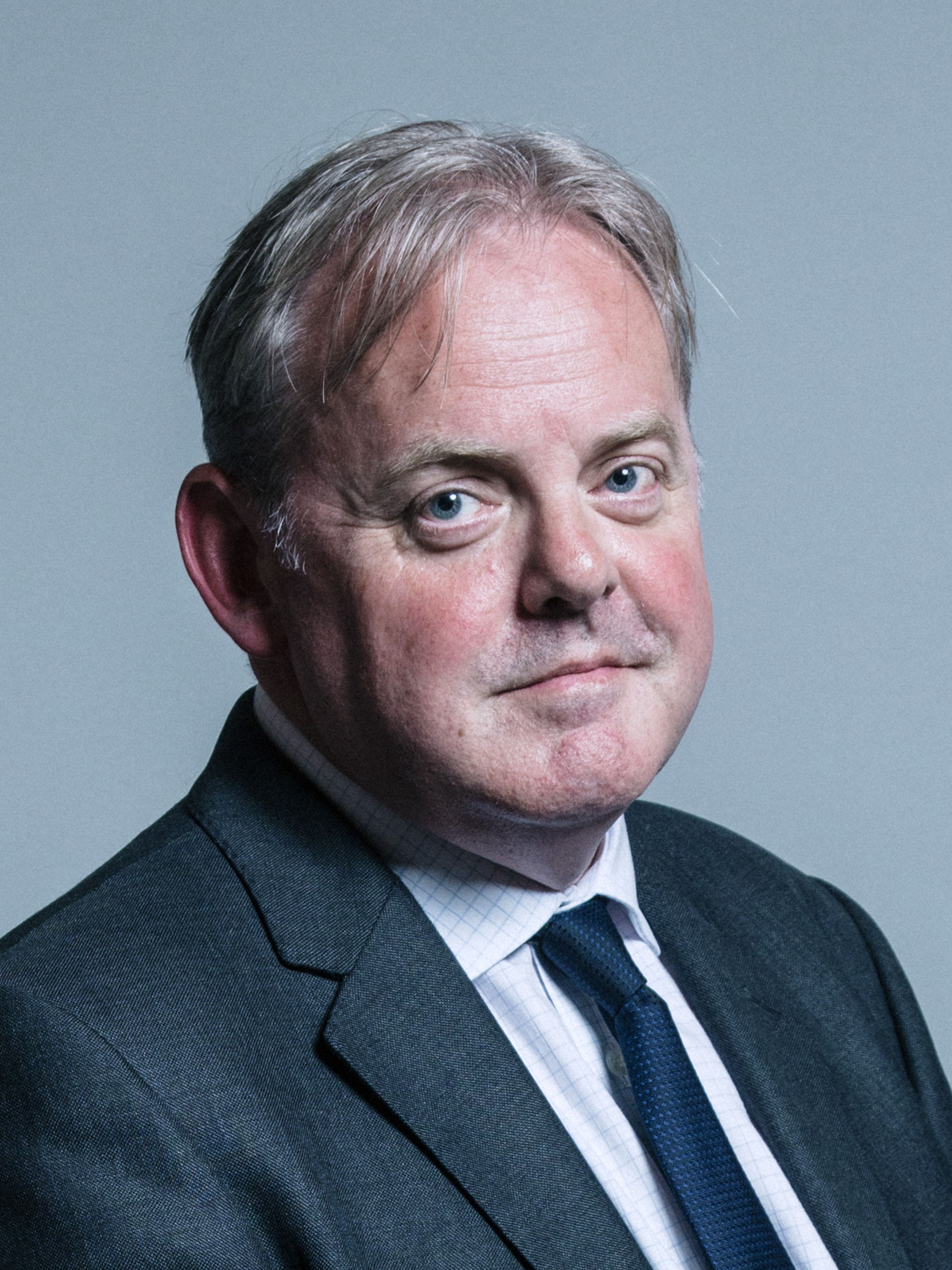
- Official portrait, 2017

Parliamentary Under-Secretary of State for Defence Procurement
- In office 9 January 2018 – 16 July 2018
- Prime Minister: Theresa May
- Preceded by: Harriett Baldwin
- Succeeded by: Stuart Andrew

Parliamentary Under-Secretary of State for Wales
- In office 19 March 2016 – 9 January 2018
- Prime Minister: David Cameron; Theresa May
- Preceded by: Alun Cairns
- Succeeded by: Stuart Andrew

Lord Commissioner of the Treasury
- In office 19 March 2016 – 9 January 2018
- Prime Minister: David Cameron; Theresa May
- Preceded by: Alun Cairns
- Succeeded by: Paul Maynard

Member of Parliament for Aberconwy
- In office 6 May 2010 – 6 November 2019
- Preceded by: Constituency established
- Succeeded by: Robin Millar

Personal details
- Born: Guto ap Owain Bebb; 9 October 1968 (age 57) Wrexham, Wales
- Party: Independent (2019); Conservative (2002–2019); Plaid Cymru (before 2002)
- Spouse: Esyllt Bebb
- Children: 5
- Education: Aberystwyth University
- Website: Official website Parliament biography

Guto ap Owain Bebb (born 9 October 1968) is a Welsh politician and former business consultant who served as Member of Parliament (MP) for Aberconwy from 2010 to 2019, having previously lost elections to the Welsh Assembly and the House of Commons. He served as Parliamentary Under-Secretary of State at the Wales Office in 2016–2018 and as Parliamentary Under-Secretary of State for Defence Procurement at the Ministry of Defence from January 2018 until he resigned in July 2018. First elected as a Conservative, Bebb had the Conservative whip removed on 3 September 2019 and served his remaining months as an independent.

== Early life and career ==
Bebb was born in Wrexham on 9 October 1968 to a family originating from Bangor and Blaenau Ffestiniog. He studied at Ysgol Syr Hugh Owen in Caernarfon, then graduated in 1990 from the University of Wales, Aberystwyth, with a BA in history. He went on to run an economic development consultancy and work as business development director of Innovas Wales. He was also a partner in his wife's bookshop.

Bebb is a former Plaid Cymru activist and chaired the party in Caernarfon. He defected to the Conservatives after failing to gain the party's candidacy for a seat on long-serving incumbent Dafydd Wigley's retirement.

Bebb first stood for the Conservatives in 2002, contesting the safe Labour seat of Ogmore in a 2002 by-election caused by the death of the Labour MP Sir Raymond Powell. He finished a poor fourth behind the successful Huw Irranca-Davies. He stood again in the 2003 Welsh Assembly election, as a candidate in the now-abolished constituency of Conwy. He came third behind Labour and Plaid Cymru. At the 2005 general election he stood in Conwy, this time coming second to Labour.

== Parliamentary career ==
At the 2010 general election, boundary changes led to a new constituency called Aberconwy, based on the former Conwy. Bebb was selected as Conservative candidate and returned as MP for Aberconwy with a majority of 3,398 (11.3 per cent of votes cast).

He has joined several delegations of the Conservative Friends of Israel group, including one during the Operation Defensive Shield conflict, when he visited for an Israeli military briefing on the Iron Dome defence system.

In 2013, Bebb voted against same-sex marriage, but changed his view in 2019, voting in favour of it in Northern Ireland.

In March 2016, Bebb became the Parliamentary Under-Secretary of State for Wales, after Stephen Crabb's move to the Department for Work and Pensions, and Alun Cairns's subsequent promotion to Secretary of State for Wales. During Theresa May's January 2018 reshuffle he gained the more senior position of Minister for Defence Procurement in the Ministry of Defence.

In the House of Commons, he has previously sat on the Public Accounts Committee, the Members' Expenses Committee and the Welsh Affairs Committee.

Bebb stood down at the 2019 general election, citing concerns about the direction the Conservatives were taking.

=== Fair business banking ===
In January 2012, after a complaint by a constituent, Bebb raised the issue of the sale of Interest Rate Swap Agreements (IRSAs) in Parliament. He asked the Leader of the House for a debate on potential mis-selling of these complex interest-rate hedging products (IRHPs) by UK high street banks to over 40,000 small and medium-sized businesses (SMEs) throughout the UK. He also asked the Financial Services Authority (FSA) to look into the issue urgently and in detail. Thereafter the FSA announced it would carry out an investigation into the way these had been sold. On 21 June 2012, Bebb called a backbench business debate in the House of Commons to discuss the IRSA/IRHP mis-selling issue.

After the debate, Bebb wrote to all MPs who had shown interest, inviting them to join an All Party Parliamentary Group seeking meaningful redress for SMEs affected and pursue this on a cross-party basis. By March 2015 there were over 100 cross-party MPs on the APPG, chaired by Calum Kerr MP; the group was renamed Fair Business Banking.

On 29 June 2012, the FSA reported evidence that over 90 per cent of the sales had been mis-sales and that substantial damage had resulted to SMEs which had been mis-sold these products. The FSA announced it had agreed with the four largest high street banks on a review and redress scheme. This was later extended to another seven banks. Viewing the slow progress and poor customer outcomes from the bank-led FSA IRHP Review, Bebb then called and led further back-bench debates on the issue — the last in December 2014, when MPs across the house criticised the poor performance of the Financial Conduct Authority (successor to the FSA) IRHP Review scheme.

After hearings with the FCA and complaints from the APPG, victim groups, individual victims and various industry experts, the Treasury Select Committee (TSC) on 10 March 2015 published a report expressing concerns about the performance of the FCA's IRHP Redress Scheme and called for an independently monitored review of it. This call was backed by the then Economic Secretary to the Treasury, Andrea Leadsom. The FCA has yet to respond to either the TSC or HM Treasury.

=== Controversies ===
Bebb employed his wife as a part-time office manager. In August 2017, he was accused of nepotism, having made the appointment just before a parliamentary ban on such practices came into force. Some sections of the media had previously criticised the practice of MPs employing family members, as unfair to other potential candidates. Though MPs who were first elected in 2017 have been banned from employing family members, the move was not retrospective: Bebb's employment of his wife remained lawful.

In August 2013, it was reported that Bebb had claimed the third highest food and drinks expenses claim in the country and the highest overall expenses claim for an MP in North Wales. He responded that all his claims were within the revised expenses regulations. In October 2012, he was criticised for claiming expenses for first-class tickets when he travelled by rail, despite official guidance from parliamentary watchdog IPSA – set up in the wake of the 2009 expenses scandal – saying politicians should "consider value for money" when booking tickets. However, he argued that his claims were permissible under the expenses rules and that the first class tickets were cheaper than some standard class tickets available.

Bebb attracted media notice for using controversial language against critical constituents. In 2014, he entered a dispute with an Aberconwy constituent after an exchange on Twitter, leading to media criticism of negative comments he made about Asperger's syndrome.

In April 2015, argumentative emails between Bebb and his local Conservative Party Association chairman were leaked and reported by the BBC. Bebb was accused of lack of loyalty and support to the Welsh Conservatives, for not living in the constituency and for being egocentric. Bebb replied that the chairman was a "disgrace" and his own work was in line with advice from the national Conservative Party.

=== European Union ===
Bebb was opposed to Brexit before the 2016 EU membership referendum. He retained Aberconwy in the 2017 general election with a small majority of 635 votes.

On 16 July 2018, Bebb voted against the government on the Taxation (Cross Border Trade) Bill, so resigning as Minister for Defence Procurement by convention of the payroll vote. He also backed the People's Vote campaign for a public vote on the final Brexit deal, co-founding the Right to Vote group in early 2019. Bebb's withdrawal as minister left him free to endorse a second referendum on Brexit.

== Post parliamentary career ==
Since 2020 Bebb has been employed by the Farmers' Union of Wales, first as managing director of its insurance services and since 2021 as the managing director of the whole union.

Between 2024 and 2025 he was the interim chair of the Welsh language broadcaster S4C.

== Personal life ==
Bebb's native language is Welsh. He is the grandson of Ambrose Bebb, co-founder of Plaid Cymru, the nephew of Welsh rugby international Dewi Bebb and the first cousin of professional golfer Sion Bebb. He is married to Esyllt Bebb. The couple have five children.

Parliament of the United Kingdom
| New constituency | Member of Parliament for Aberconwy; 2010–2019 | Succeeded by Robin Millar |
