= Claire Hughes =

Welsh politician

Claire Hughes MP
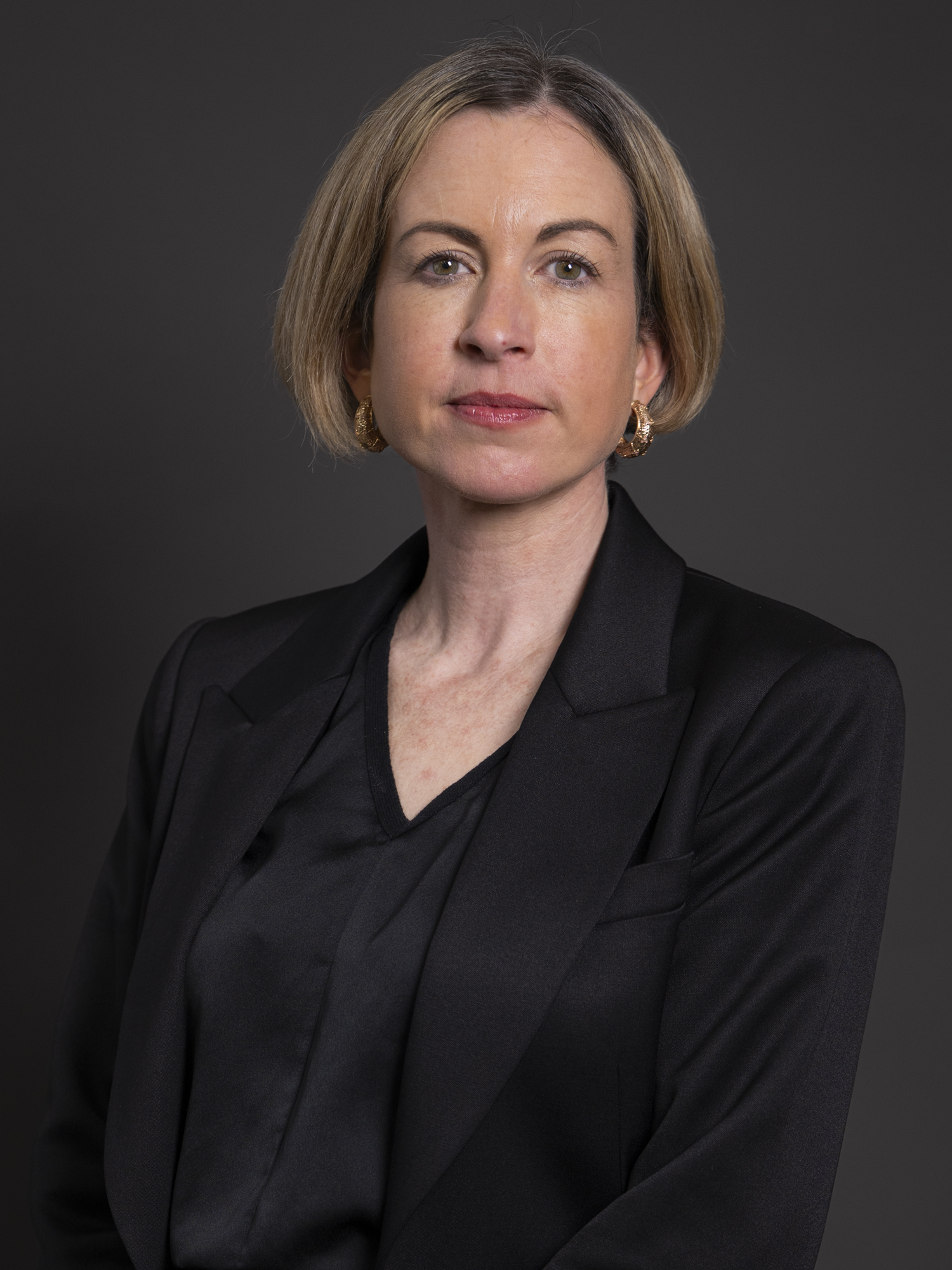
- Official portrait, 2025

Parliamentary Under-Secretary of State for Wales
- Incumbent
- Assumed office 16 September 2025 Serving with Anna McMorrin
- Prime Minister: Keir Starmer
- Preceded by: Nia Griffith

Member of Parliament for Bangor Aberconwy
- Incumbent
- Assumed office 4 July 2024
- Preceded by: Constituency established
- Majority: 4,896 (11.9%)

Personal details
- Born: Bangor, Gwynedd, Wales
- Party: Labour

Claire Diane Hughes is a Welsh Labour politician who has served as the Member of Parliament (MP) for Bangor Aberconwy since 2024. In 2026, she was appointed Parliamentary Under-Secretary of State for Wales.

== Early life ==
Hughes was born in Bangor, Gwynedd and raised in the nearby town of Penmaenmawr.

== Career ==
Hughes worked as head of growth at software company Tahdah Verified Ltd and co-founder and head of growth at workspace company Pluto. Before entering politics, she worked in London and abroad in Spain.

She previously worked as a digital communications lead for Labour during the 2016 Welsh Assembly election campaign, as well as working for Tom Watson during his time as Deputy Leader of the Labour Party.

== Parliamentary career ==
At the 2024 general election, Hughes was elected as the Labour Member of Parliament for Bangor Aberconwy with 33.6% of the vote and a majority of 4,896 over Plaid Cymru candidate Catrin Wager in second, defeating incumbent Conservative MP Robin Millar.

In the 2025 British cabinet reshuffle, she was promoted to a junior minister at Wales Office and to an assistant whip in the House of Commons.

== Personal life ==
On 20 October 2025, Hughes announced a breast cancer diagnosis. She is undergoing treatment. She will step back from her government role.

Parliament of the United Kingdom
Preceded by Robin Millar	Member of Parliament for Bangor Aberconwy; 2024–present	Incumbent
