= Bangor Aberconwy =

UK Parliament constituency (since 2024)

- constituency for the House of Commons
- Interactive map of the constituency.
- Location of the constituency within Wales
- Electorate: 70,468 (March 2020)
- Major settlements: Bangor, Conwy, Llandudno, Llandudno Junction

Current constituency
- Created: 2024
- Member of Parliament: Claire Hughes (Labour)
- Seats: One
- Created from: Aberconwy, Arfon, Clwyd West

Overlaps
- Senedd: Bangor Conwy Môn

Bangor Aberconwy is a constituency of the House of Commons in the UK Parliament, that was first contested at the 2024 general election, following the 2023 review of Westminster constituencies. It is currently represented by Claire Hughes of the Labour Party.

== Boundaries ==
Under the 2023 review, the constituency is defined as being composed of the following, as they existed on 1 December 2020:

- The County Borough of Conwy wards of: Betws-y-Coed; Betws yn Rhos; Bryn; Caerhun; Capelulo; Conwy; Craig-y-Don; Crwst; Deganwy; Eglwysbach; Gogarth; Gower; Llangernyw; Llansanffraid; Llansannan; Marl; Mostyn; Pandy; Pant-yr-Afon/Penmaenan; Penrhyn; Pensarn; Trefriw; Tudno; Uwch Conwy; Uwchaled.
- The County of Denbighshire wards of: Efenechtyd; Llanrhaeadr-Yng-Nghinmeirch.
- The County of Gwynedd wards of: Arllechwedd; Deiniol; Dewi; Garth; Gerlan; Glyder; Hendre; Hirael; Marchog; Menai (Bangor); Ogwen; Pentir; Tregarth & Mynydd Llandygai.

Following local government boundary reviews which came into effect in May 2022, the constituency now comprises the following from the 2024 general election:

- The County Borough of Conwy wards of: Betws-y-Coed and Trefriw; Betws yn Rhos; Bryn; Caerhun; Conwy; Craig-y-Don; Deganwy; Eglwysbach a Llangernyw; Glyn y Marl; Gogarth Mostyn; Llanrwst a Llanddoged; Llansanffraid; Llansannan; Mochdre; Pandy; Penmaenmawr; Penrhyn; Tudno; Uwch Aled; Uwch Conwy.
- The County of Denbighshire wards of: Efenechtyd; Llanrhaeadr-Yng-Nghinmeirch.
- The County of Gwynedd wards of: Arllechwedd; Canol Bangor; Dewi; Dwyrain Bangor; Gerlan; Glyder; Rachub; Tre-Garth a Mynydd Llandygai; Y Faenol.

The constituency comprises the whole of the abolished Aberconwy constituency, expanded to the west to include Bangor from the abolished Arfon constituency, and to the east to include a small part of the abolished Clwyd West constituency.

== Elections ==
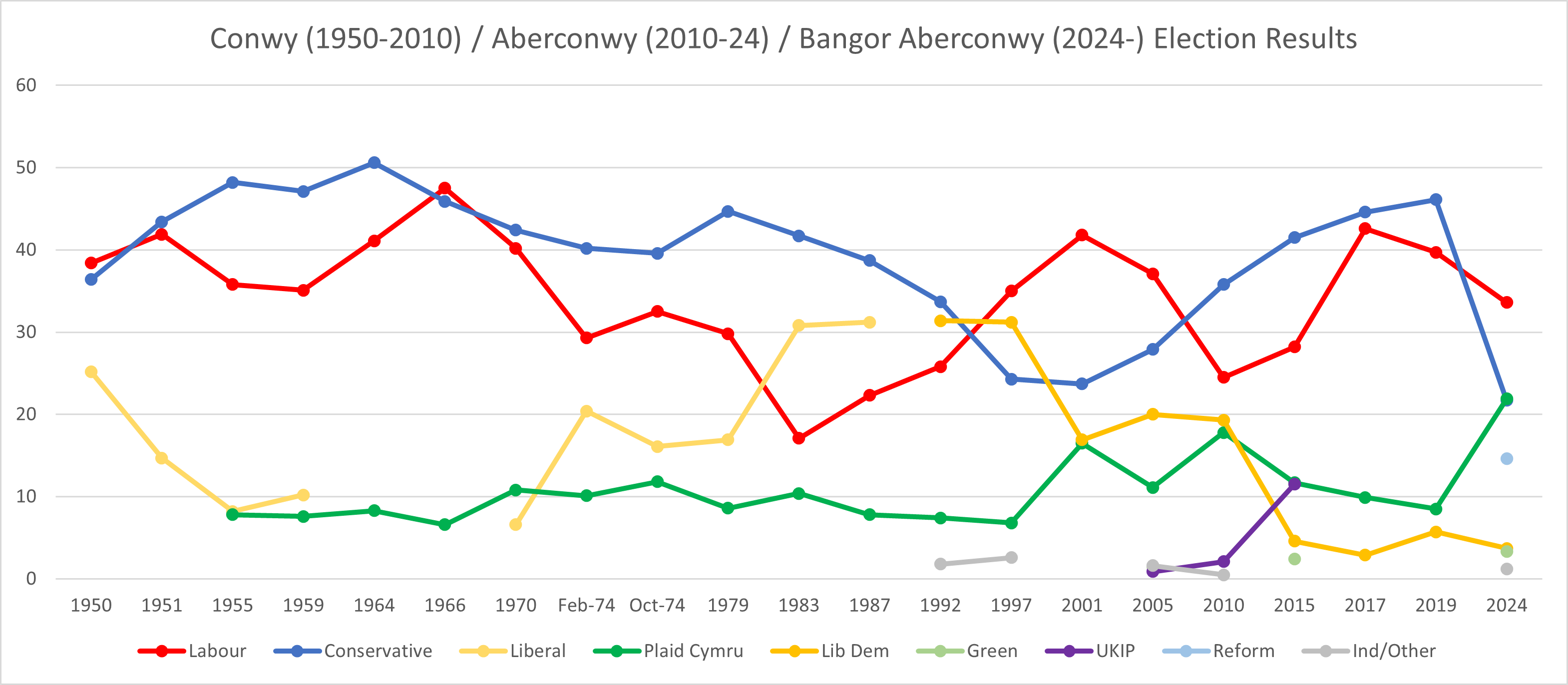
Conwy (1950–2010) / Aberconwy (2010–24) / Bangor Aberconwy (2024–present) Election Results

=== Elections in the 2020s ===
General election 2024: Bangor Aberconwy
Party	Candidate	Votes	%	±%
Labour	Claire Hughes	14,008	33.6	▼4.8
Plaid Cymru	Catrin Wager	9,112	21.9	▲5.7
Conservative	Robin Millar	9,036	21.7	▼18.3
Reform	John Clark	6,091	14.6	▲13.7
Liberal Democrats	Rachael Roberts	1,524	3.7	▼0.7
Green	Petra Haig	1,361	3.3	New
Socialist Labour	Kathrine Jones	424	1.0	New
Climate	Steve Marshall	104	0.2	New
Majority		4,896	11.7	N/A
Turnout		41,660	60.4	▼8.3
Registered electors		70,527		
Labour gain from Conservative		Swing		

=== Elections in the 2010s ===
2019 notional result (Note: Estimate of the 2019 general election result as if the revised boundaries recommended under the 2023 boundary review were in place)
Party	Vote	%
Conservative	19,355	40.0
Labour	18,606	38.4
Plaid Cymru	7,849	16.2
Liberal Democrats	2,142	4.4
Brexit Party	455	0.9
Majority	749	1.5
Turnout	48,407	68.7
Electorate	70,468	
