= Aberconwy (UK Parliament constituency) =

UK Parliament constituency (2010–2024)

Coordinates: 53.302°N 3.805°W

- Former county constituency for the House of Commons
- Boundary of Aberconwy in Wales for the 2010 general election
- Preserved county: Clwyd
- Electorate: 44,444 (December 2018)
- Major settlements: Llandudno, Conwy, Llandudno Junction

2010–2024
- Seats: One
- Created from: Conwy and Meirionnydd Nant Conwy
- Replaced by: Bangor Aberconwy
- Senedd: Aberconwy, North Wales

Aberconwy was a constituency (Note: A borough constituency (for the purposes of election expenses and type of returning officer)) represented in the House of Commons of the UK Parliament. (Note: As with all constituencies, the constituency elected one Member of Parliament (MP) by the first past the post system of election at least every five years.)

The seat was created by the Welsh Boundary Commission for the 2010 general election, and replaced the old north Wales seat of Conwy. The same boundaries have been used for the Aberconwy Senedd constituency since the 2007 Welsh Assembly election.

The constituency was abolished as part of the 2023 Periodic Review of Westminster constituencies and under the June 2023 final recommendations of the Boundary Commission for Wales for the 2024 United Kingdom general election. The entire constituency became part of Bangor Aberconwy.

== Boundaries ==
Map of boundaries 2010-2024

The constituency was a new creation of the Boundary Commission for Wales and was based on the existing Conwy seat. It was centred on Llandudno, Conwy town and associated suburbs such as Deganwy and Penrhyn Bay, along with the Conwy Valley. The other main component of the former Conwy seat, Bangor, was removed to the Arfon constituency.

The name Aberconwy was chosen partly to avoid confusion between the former Conwy parliamentary seat (which, confusingly, had been the name first proposed by the commission for the new seat), the existing county borough, town council and ward name. The seat was coterminous with the old Aberconwy district, abolished in 1996, and thus the name was thought to be a natural one with which to name the new constituency. Bangor, the main Labour voting area of the former Conwy constituency, is no longer within the constituency, whereas the more Conservative areas such as Llandudno and Conwy itself are retained. The constituency is diverse, combining Welsh-speaking rural areas, English-speaking coastal dwellers, many affluent suburbs, pockets of relative poverty, seaside resorts such as Llandudno and more industrial areas such as Llandudno Junction. In many ways the new Aberconwy seat resembled its neighbour Clwyd West (the other seat covering Conwy County Borough) to a large degree, as both seats have a similar social profile and, as seems likely, a similar voting pattern.

The wards of Conwy County Borough that were incorporated into the Aberconwy seat were:

- Betws-y-Coed, Bryn, Caerhun, Capelulo, Crwst, Conwy, Craig Y Don, Deganwy, Eglwysbach, Gogarth, Gower, Llansanffraid Glan Conwy, Marl, Mostyn, Pandy, Pant Yr Afon/Penmaenan, Penrhyn, Pensarn, Trefriw, Tudno and Uwch Conwy.

== Members of Parliament ==
Election	Member	Party
2010	Guto Bebb	Conservative
2019	Guto Bebb	Independent
2019	Robin Millar	Conservative
2024	Constituency abolished	

== Elections ==
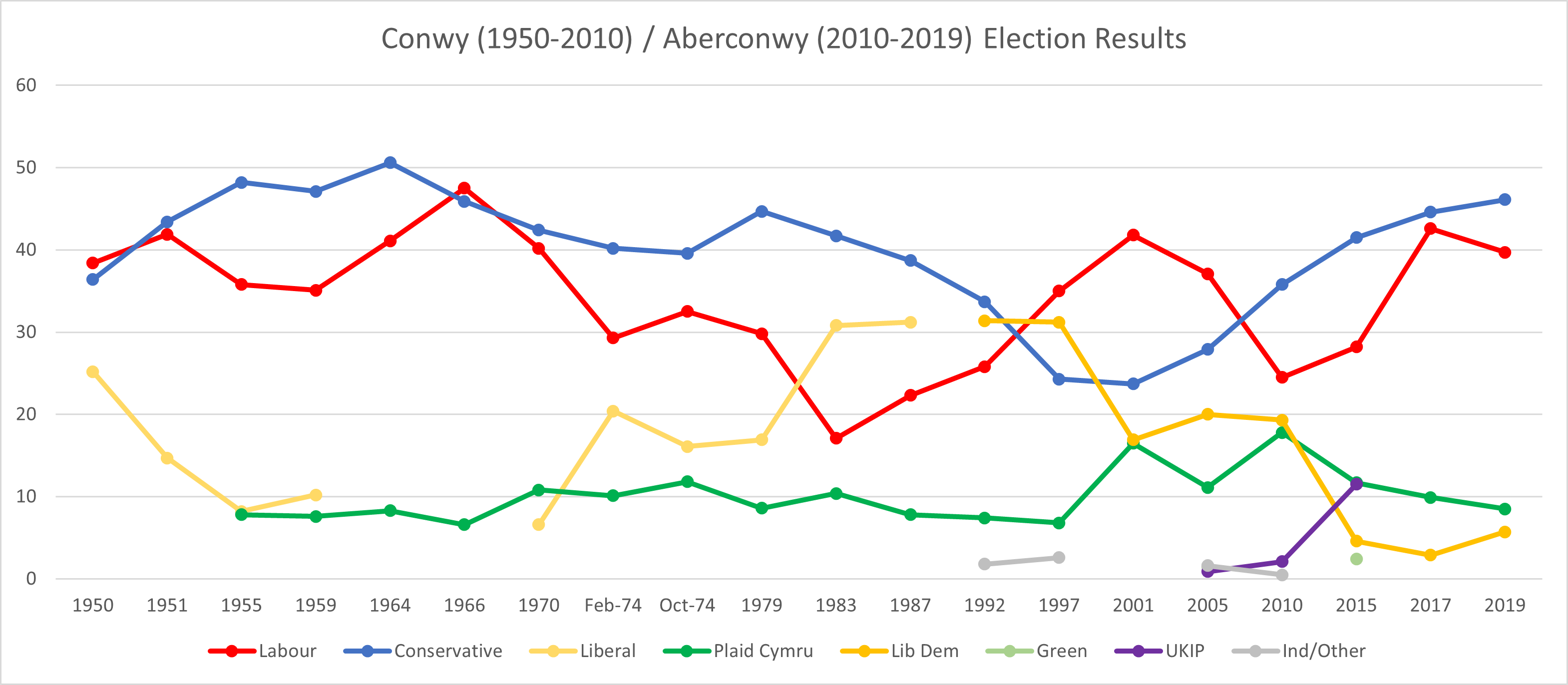
Conwy (1950–2010) / Aberconwy (2010–2019) Election Results

=== Elections in the 2010s ===
General election 2010: Aberconwy
Party	Candidate	Votes	%	±%
Conservative	Guto Bebb	10,734	35.8	N/A
Labour	Ronnie Hughes	7,336	24.5	N/A
Liberal Democrats	Mike Priestley	5,786	19.3	N/A
Plaid Cymru	Phil Edwards	5,341	17.8	N/A
UKIP	Mike Wieteska	632	2.1	N/A
Christian	Louise Wynne Jones	137	0.5	N/A
Majority		3,398	11.3	N/A
Turnout		29,966	67.2	N/A
Registered electors		44,593		
Conservative win (new seat)				

Of the 69 rejected ballots:

- 49 were either unmarked or it was uncertain who the vote was for.
- 20 voted for more than one candidate.

General election 2015: Aberconwy
Party	Candidate	Votes	%	±%
Conservative	Guto Bebb	12,513	41.5	+5.7
Labour	Mary Wimbury	8,514	28.2	+3.7
Plaid Cymru	Dafydd Meurig	3,536	11.7	−6.1
UKIP	Andrew Haigh	3,467	11.5	+9.4
Liberal Democrats	Victor Babu	1,391	4.6	−14.7
Green	Petra Haig	727	2.4	N/A
Rejected ballots		59		
Majority		3,999	13.3	+2.0
Turnout		30,148	66.2	−1.0
Registered electors		45,525		
Conservative hold		Swing	+1.0	

Of the 59 rejected ballots:

- 33 were either unmarked or it was uncertain who the vote was for.
- 12 voted for more than one candidate.
- 14 had writing or mark by which the voter could be identified.

General election 2017: Aberconwy
Party	Candidate	Votes	%	±%
Conservative	Guto Bebb	14,337	44.6	+3.1
Labour	Emily Owen	13,702	42.6	+14.4
Plaid Cymru	Wyn Elis Jones	3,170	9.9	−1.8
Liberal Democrats	Sarah Leister-Burgess	941	2.9	−1.7
Rejected ballots		78		
Majority		635	2.0	−11.3
Turnout		32,150	71.0	+4.8
Registered electors		45,251		
Conservative hold		Swing	−5.7	

Of the 78 rejected ballots:

- 58 were either unmarked or it was uncertain who the vote was for.
- 20 voted for more than one candidate.

General election 2019: Aberconwy
Party	Candidate	Votes	%	±%
Conservative	Robin Millar	14,687	46.1	+1.5
Labour	Emily Owen	12,653	39.7	−2.9
Plaid Cymru	Lisa Goodier	2,704	8.5	−1.4
Liberal Democrats	Jason Edwards	1,821	5.7	+2.8
Rejected ballots		123		
Majority		2,034	6.4	+4.4
Turnout		31,865	71.3	+0.3
Registered electors		44,699		
Conservative hold		Swing	+2.2	

Of the 123 rejected ballots:

- 102 were either unmarked or it was uncertain who the vote was for.
- 20 voted for more than one candidate.
- 1 had writing or mark by which the voter could be identified.

== See also ==
- Aberconwy (Senedd constituency)
- List of parliamentary constituencies in Clwyd
- List of parliamentary constituencies in Wales
