= Merthyr Tydfil and Aberdare =

UK Parliament constituency (since 2024)

- constituency for the House of Commons
- Interactive map of the constituency.
- Location of the constituency within Wales
- Electorate: 74,805 (March 2020)
- Major settlements: Merthyr Tydfil, Aberdare, Hirwaun, Treharris, Cwmbach

Current constituency
- Created: 2024
- Member of Parliament: Gerald Jones (Labour)
- Seats: One
- Created from: Merthyr Tydfil and Rhymney, Cynon Valley

Overlaps
- Senedd: Pontypridd Cynon Merthyr

Merthyr Tydfil and Aberdare (Welsh: Merthyr Tudful ac Aberdâr) is a constituency of the House of Commons in the UK Parliament, first contested at the 2024 United Kingdom general election, following the 2023 Periodic Review of Westminster constituencies. It is currently represented by Gerald Jones of the Labour Party, who was previously the MP for the predecessor constituency of Merthyr Tydfil and Rhymney from 2015 to 2024.

== Boundaries ==
Under the 2023 review, the constituency was defined as being composed of the following, as they existed on 1 December 2020:

- The County Borough of Merthyr Tydfil.
- The County Borough of Rhondda Cynon Taf wards of: Aberaman North; Aberaman South; Aberdare East; Aberdare West/Llwydcoed; Cwmbach; Hirwaun; Pen-y-waun; Rhigos.

Following local government boundary reviews which came into effect in May 2022, the constituency now comprises the following from the 2024 general election:

- The County Borough of Merthyr Tydfil.
- The County Borough of Rhondda Cynon Taf wards of: Aberaman; Aberdare East; Aberdare West and Llwydcoed; Cwmbach; Hirwaun, Penderyn and Rhigos; Pen-y-waun.

Merthyr Tydfil County Borough previously formed the majority of the abolished Merthyr Tydfil and Rhymney constituency; areas in Rhondda Cynon Taf were part of the abolished Cynon Valley constituency.

== Election results ==
=== Elections in the 2020s ===
General election 2024: Merthyr Tydfil and Aberdare
Party	Candidate	Votes	%	±%
Labour	Gerald Jones	15,791	44.8	−6.9
Reform	Gareth Thomas	8,344	23.7	+13.0
Plaid Cymru	Francis Daniel Whitefoot	4,768	13.5	+5.4
Conservative	Amanda Jenner	2,687	7.6	−13.0
Liberal Democrats	Jade Smith	1,276	3.6	+0.3
Green	David Griffin	1,231	3.5	N/A
Workers Party	Anthony Cole	531	1.5	N/A
Independent	Lorenzo De Gregori	375	1.1	N/A
Communist	Bob Davenport	212	0.6	N/A
Majority		7,447	21.2	
Turnout		35,215	47.3	−10.3
Registered electors		74,460		
Labour hold		Swing	−9.9	

=== Elections in the 2010s ===
2019 notional result (Note: Estimate of the 2019 general election result as if the revised boundaries recommended under the 2023 boundary review were in place)
Party	Vote	%
Labour	22,292	51.7
Conservative	8,882	20.6
Brexit Party	4,621	10.7
Plaid Cymru	3,513	8.1
Independent	1,482	3.4
Liberal Democrats	1,434	3.3
Other (2 candidates)	882	2.1
Majority	13,410	31.1
Turnout	43,106	57.6
Electorate	74,805	
