= Gerald Jones =

Welsh Labour politician

Gerald Jones MP
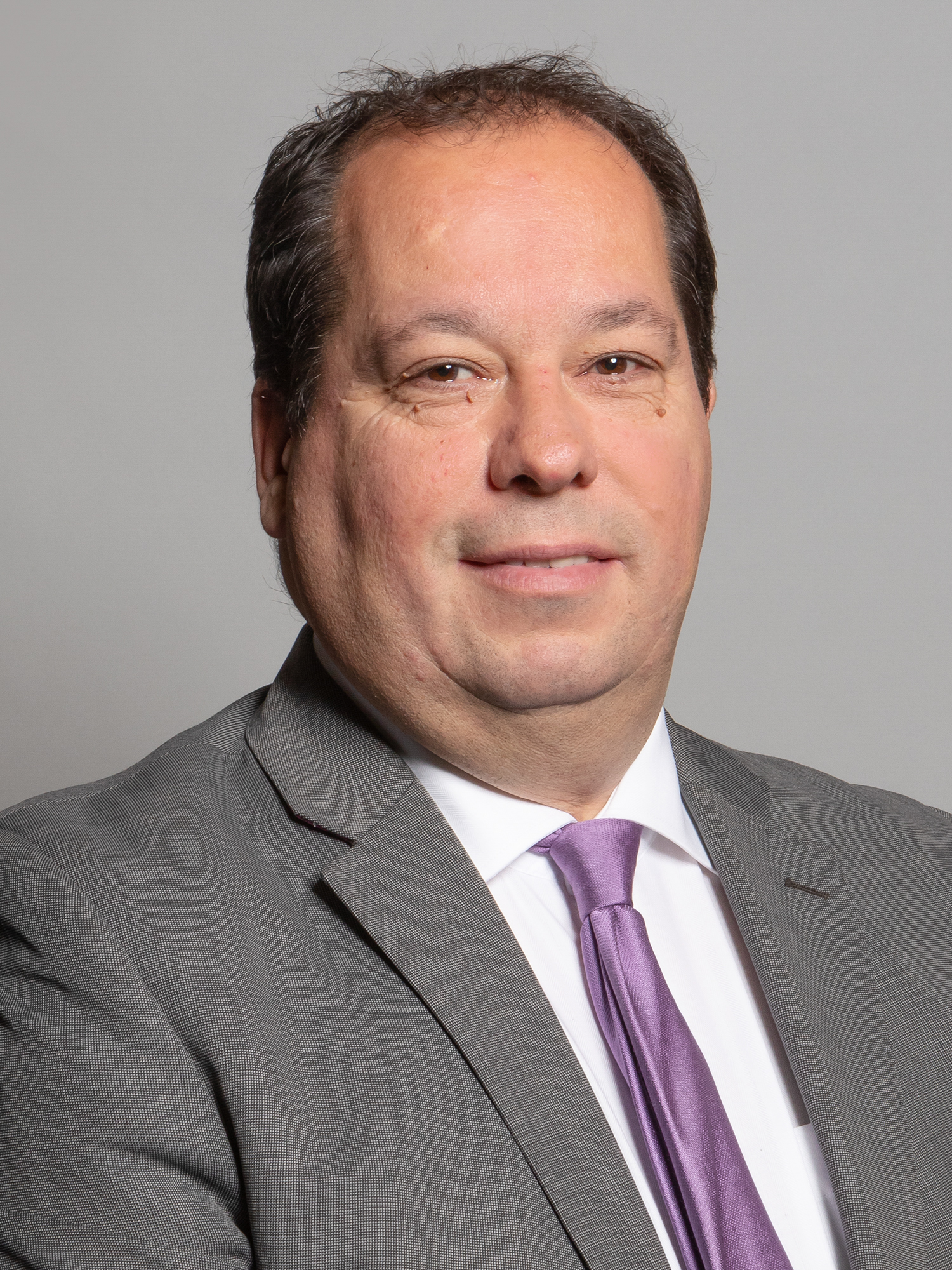
- Official portrait, 2020

Assistant Government Whip
- In office 10 July 2024 – 7 September 2025
- Prime Minister: Keir Starmer

Member of Parliament for Merthyr Tydfil and Aberdare Merthyr Tydfil and Rhymney (2015–2024)
- Incumbent
- Assumed office 7 May 2015
- Preceded by: Dai Havard
- Majority: 7,447 (21.1%)

Personal details
- Born: 21 August 1970 (age 56) Phillipstown, Wales
- Party: Labour
- Website: www.geraldjones.co.uk

Gerald Jones (born 21 August 1970) is a Welsh Labour Party politician who has been the Member of Parliament (MP) for Merthyr Tydfil and Aberdare, formerly Merthyr Tydfil and Rhymney, since 2015. He was an Assistant Government Whip from 2024 to 2025 and previously served as Shadow Minister for Wales.

== Early life and career ==
Gerald Jones was born on 21 August 1970 in Phillipstown.

He joined the Labour Party in 1988, and has served in a range of roles including Chairperson of New Tredegar Branch Labour Party and the Merthyr Tydfil & Rhymney Constituency Labour Party. Between 2003 and 2015, he served as an election agent in both the UK general elections and Welsh Assembly election campaigns across Merthyr Tydfil and Rhymney.

Jones was elected as a Labour Councillor to Caerphilly County Borough Council in 1995, representing his home community of New Tredegar for the next 20 years. He also served as Deputy Leader of the Council and between 2012 and 2015 also served as Cabinet Member for Housing where he drove the council's commitment to delivering the Welsh Housing Quality Standard programme. Jones also served as the Anti Poverty and Homelessness Champion.

== Parliamentary career ==
At the 2015 general election, Jones was elected to Parliament as MP for Merthyr Tydfil and Rhymney with 53.9% of the vote and a majority of 11,513.

He supported Owen Smith in the failed attempt to replace Jeremy Corbyn in the 2016 Labour leadership election.

Having served as a Parliamentary Private Secretary (PPS) to the Shadow Wales and Defence teams, he was appointed by Labour leader Jeremy Corbyn as a Shadow Wales Minister in October 2016 and a Shadow Defence Minister in July 2017.

Jones was re-elected as MP for Merthyr Tydfil and Rhymney at the snap 2017 general election with an increased vote share of 66.8% and an increased majority of 16,334. He was again re-elected at the 2019 general election, with a decreased vote share of 52.4% and a decreased majority of 10,606.

Due to the 2023 Periodic Review of Westminster constituencies, Jones' constituency of Merthyr Tydfil and Rhymney was abolished, and replaced with Merthyr Tydfil and Upper Cynon. In June 2023, Jones defeated Beth Winter to be selected as the Labour candidate for Merthyr Tydfil and Upper Cynon at the 2024 general election. The seat was ultimately renamed Merthyr Tydfil and Aberdare in the final recommendations published late in the month.

In the 2023 British shadow cabinet reshuffle, he was appointed Shadow Minister for Scotland.

At the 2024 general election, Jones was elected to Parliament as MP for Merthyr Tydfil and Aberdare with 44.8% of the vote and a majority of 7,447. He was appointed an Assistant Government Whip in July 2024, serving until his departure from Government in the September 2025 reshuffle.

== Personal life ==
He is gay and employs his partner, Tyrone Powell, as his Senior Parliamentary Assistant.

Parliament of the United Kingdom
Preceded by Dai Havard	Member of Parliament for Merthyr Tydfil and Rhymney; 2015–2024	Constituency abolished
New constituency	Member of Parliament for Merthyr Tydfil and Aberdare; 2024–present	Incumbent
