= Robin Millar (politician) =

British politician (born 1968)

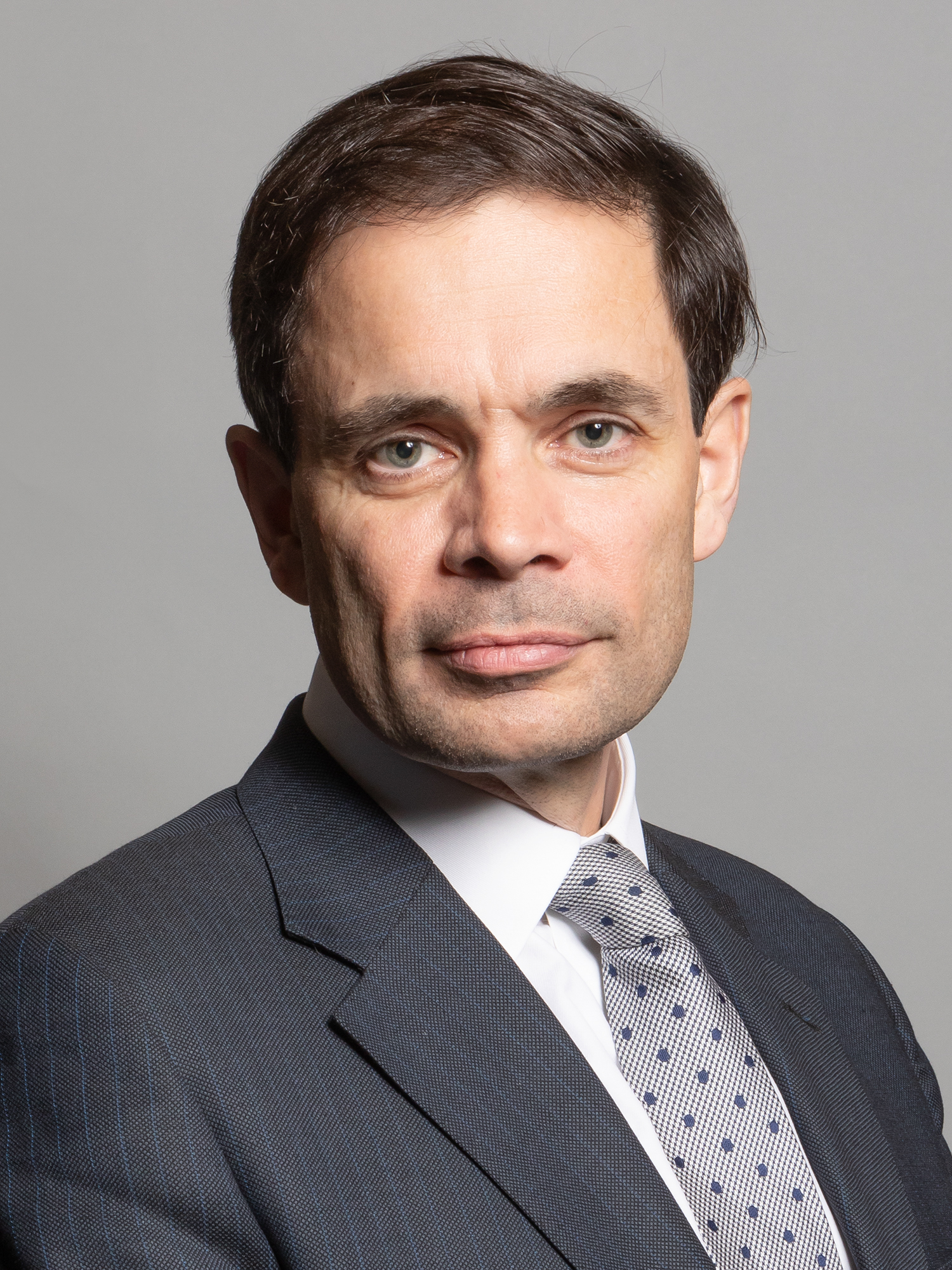
- Official portrait, 2020

Member of Parliament for Aberconwy
- In office 12 December 2019 – 30 May 2024
- Preceded by: Guto Bebb
- Succeeded by: Constituency abolished

Personal details
- Born: 15 October 1968 (age 57) Bangor, Gwynedd, Wales
- Party: Conservative
- Education: University of Manchester

Robin John Millar (born 15 October 1968) is a British Conservative Party politician who served as the Member of Parliament (MP) for Aberconwy from 2019 to 2024.

== Early life and education ==
Robin Millar was born in Bangor in 1968, where his father was chairman of the Conwy Conservative Association. Millar went to Ysgol Friars School, then studied civil engineering at UMIST and later moved to Suffolk to support his wife’s work as an equine veterinary nurse. While living there he worked as a civil engineer in Cambridge, Russia, the Netherlands and the USA. He later set up Millar Consulting helping to transform public services, local government and membership organisations.

== Political career ==
Millar started his political career in 2003 as a member of Forest Heath Council for the All Saints ward in Newmarket. Millar was deputy leader of Forest Heath Council and Mayor of Newmarket in 2003. When journalist Bill Curtis asked Millar why he got into politics, he told the interviewer that he has 'always been a problem solver'.

He contested the Arfon constituency at the 2010 general election, finishing in 3rd place with 16.7% of the vote. He later became a member for both Suffolk County Council for the Newmarket and Red Lodge seat and West Suffolk District Council for Newmarket North before becoming an MP in 2019.

He resigned as a director and trustee of the Conservative Christian Fellowship on his election.

In May 2021 Millar wrote an essay entitled "A Common Sense Model for Poverty" for inclusion in Common Sense: Conservative Thinking for a Post-Liberal Age published by the Common Sense Group, an informal group of Conservative MPs.

In October 2022, he was appointed Parliamentary Private Secretary to the Secretary of State for Scotland and the Secretary of State for Wales. Millar resigned from the position on 29 June 2023 in order to vote against new regulations on sex education in Northern Ireland. Millar was Chairman of the Outdoor Learning All Party Parliamentary Group. He backed the Outdoor Learning Policy Report, a policy report by UK Youth, in October 2023.

At the 2024 general election, Millar stood for re-election in the successor constituency of Bangor Aberconwy, where he was pushed into third place with 9,036 votes (21.7%).

Parliament of the United Kingdom
Preceded by Guto Bebb	Member of Parliament for Aberconwy; 2019–2024	Constituency abolished
