= Merthyr Tydfil and Rhymney (UK Parliament constituency) =

UK Parliament constituency (1983–2024)

Coordinates: 51.752°N 3.308°W

- Former county constituency for the House of Commons
- Boundary of Merthyr Tydfil and Rhymney in Wales
- Electorate: 55,409 (December 2010)
- Major settlements: Merthyr Tydfil, Rhymney

1983–2024
- Seats: One
- Created from: Merthyr Tydfil, Caerphilly, Ebbw Vale, Bedwellty and Brecon & Radnor
- Replaced by: Blaenau Gwent and Rhymney; Merthyr Tydfil and Aberdare
- Senedd: Merthyr Tydfil and Rhymney, South Wales East

Merthyr Tydfil and Rhymney (Welsh: Merthyr Tudful a Rhymni) was a constituency (Note: A borough constituency (for the purposes of election expenses and type of returning officer)) represented in the House of Commons of the UK Parliament. (Note: As with all constituencies, the constituency elects one Member of Parliament (MP) by the first past the post system of election at least every five years.) It was established for the 1983 general election.

The constituency was abolished as part of the 2023 periodic review of Westminster constituencies and under the June 2023 final recommendations of the Boundary Commission for Wales for the 2024 general election. Its wards were split between Blaenau Gwent and Rhymney, and Merthyr Tydfil and Aberdare.

== Boundaries ==
Map of boundaries 2010–2024

1983–1997: The Borough of Merthyr Tydfil, and the District of Rhymney Valley wards Nos. 5 and 14 to 20.

1997–2010: The County Borough of Merthyr Tydfil, and the Caerphilly County Borough wards of Abertysswg, Darren Valley, Moriah, New Tredegar, Pontlottyn, Tir-Phil, and Twyn Carno.

2010–2024: The Merthyr Tydfil County Borough electoral divisions of Bedlinog, Cyfarthfa, Dowlais, Gurnos, Merthyr Vale, Park, Penydarren, Plymouth, Town, Treharris, and Vaynor, and the Caerphilly County Borough electoral divisions of Darran Valley, Moriah, New Tredegar, Pontlottyn, and Twyn Carno.

As its name suggests, the main towns were Merthyr Tydfil and Rhymney. Aberfan was also located in the constituency. The seat was bordered by the constituencies of Blaenau Gwent, Brecon and Radnorshire, Caerphilly, Cynon Valley, and Islwyn.

== History ==
The constituency was created for the 1983 general election. Prior to this, Merthyr Tydfil had been in its own eponymous constituency, and Rhymney was in the seat of Ebbw Vale (at the time Michael Foot's constituency), which was abolished at that election.

== Members of Parliament ==
| Election | Member | Party |
|---|---|---|
| 1983 | Ted Rowlands | Labour |
| 2001 | Dai Havard | Labour |
| 2015 | Gerald Jones | Labour |
| 2024 | Constituency abolished | |

== Elections ==
=== Elections in the 1980s ===
General election 1983: Merthyr Tydfil and Rhymney
| Party | Candidate | Votes | % | ±% |
|---|---|---|---|---|
| Labour | Ted Rowlands | 29,053 | 67.3 | N/A |
| Liberal | Philip Owen | 6,323 | 14.7 | N/A |
| Conservative | Richard Blausten | 5,449 | 12.6 | N/A |
| Plaid Cymru | Gerald Howells | 2,058 | 4.8 | N/A |
| Workers Revolutionary | Royden Gould | 256 | 0.6 | N/A |
| Majority | | 22,730 | 52.6 | N/A |
| Turnout | | 43,139 | 72.5 | N/A |
| Registered electors | | 59,486 | | |
| Labour win (new seat) | | | | |

General election 1987: Merthyr Tydfil and Rhymney
| Party | Candidate | Votes | % | ±% |
|---|---|---|---|---|
| Labour | Ted Rowlands | 33,477 | 75.3 | +8.0 |
| Conservative | Nicholas Walters | 5,270 | 11.9 | −0.7 |
| Liberal | Pravat Verma | 3,573 | 8.0 | −6.7 |
| Plaid Cymru | Janet Davies | 2,085 | 4.7 | −0.1 |
| Majority | | 28,130 | 63.4 | +10.8 |
| Turnout | | 44,405 | 76.2 | +3.7 |
| Registered electors | | 58,285 | | |
| Labour hold | | Swing | | |

=== Elections in the 1990s ===
General election 1992: Merthyr Tydfil and Rhymney
| Party | Candidate | Votes | % | ±% |
|---|---|---|---|---|
| Labour | Ted Rowlands | 31,710 | 71.6 | −3.7 |
| Liberal Democrats | Robyn Rowland | 4,997 | 11.3 | +3.3 |
| Conservative | Mark Hughes | 4,904 | 11.1 | −0.8 |
| Plaid Cymru | Alun Cox | 2,704 | 6.1 | +1.4 |
| Majority | | 26,713 | 60.3 | −3.1 |
| Turnout | | 44,315 | 75.8 | −0.4 |
| Registered electors | | 58,430 | | |
| Labour hold | | Swing | −3.5 | |

General election 1997: Merthyr Tydfil and Rhymney
| Party | Candidate | Votes | % | ±% |
|---|---|---|---|---|
| Labour | Ted Rowlands | 30,012 | 76.7 | +5.1 |
| Liberal Democrats | Duncan Anstey | 2,926 | 7.5 | −3.8 |
| Conservative | Jonathan Morgan | 2,508 | 6.4 | −4.7 |
| Plaid Cymru | Alun Cox | 2,344 | 6.0 | −0.1 |
| Independent Labour | Alan Cowdell | 691 | 1.8 | N/A |
| Referendum | Ronald Hutchings | 660 | 1.7 | N/A |
| Majority | | 27,086 | 69.2 | +8.9 |
| Turnout | | 39,141 | 69.3 | −6.5 |
| Registered electors | | 56,507 | | |
| Labour hold | | Swing | +4.5 | |

=== Elections in the 2000s ===
General election 2001: Merthyr Tydfil and Rhymney
| Party | Candidate | Votes | % | ±% |
|---|---|---|---|---|
| Labour | Dai Havard | 19,574 | 61.8 | −14.9 |
| Plaid Cymru | Robert Hughes | 4,651 | 14.7 | +8.7 |
| Liberal Democrats | Keith Rogers | 2,385 | 7.5 | ±0.0 |
| Conservative | Richard Cuming | 2,272 | 7.2 | +0.8 |
| Independent | Jeffrey Edwards | 1,936 | 6.1 | N/A |
| Socialist Labour | Ken Evans | 692 | 2.2 | N/A |
| ProLife Alliance | Anthony Lewis | 174 | 0.5 | N/A |
| Majority | | 14,923 | 47.1 | −22.1 |
| Turnout | | 31,684 | 57.7 | −11.6 |
| Registered electors | | 54,919 | | |
| Labour hold | | Swing | −11.8 | |

General election 2005: Merthyr Tydfil and Rhymney
| Party | Candidate | Votes | % | ±% |
|---|---|---|---|---|
| Labour | Dai Havard | 18,129 | 60.5 | −1.3 |
| Liberal Democrats | Ceirion Rees | 4,195 | 14.0 | +6.5 |
| Plaid Cymru | Noel Turner | 2,972 | 9.9 | −4.8 |
| Conservative | Roger Berry | 2,680 | 8.9 | +1.7 |
| Forward Wales | Neil Greer | 1,030 | 3.4 | N/A |
| UKIP | Gwyn Parry | 699 | 2.3 | N/A |
| Socialist Labour | Ina Marsden | 271 | 0.9 | −1.3 |
| Majority | | 13,934 | 46.5 | −0.6 |
| Turnout | | 29,976 | 54.9 | −2.8 |
| Registered electors | | 54,044 | | |
| Labour hold | | Swing | −3.9 | |

=== Elections in the 2010s ===
General election 2010: Merthyr Tydfil and Rhymney
| Party | Candidate | Votes | % | ±% |
|---|---|---|---|---|
| Labour | Dai Havard | 14,007 | 43.7 | −16.8 |
| Liberal Democrats | Amy Kitcher | 9,951 | 31.0 | +17.0 |
| Conservative | Maria Hill | 2,412 | 7.5 | −1.4 |
| Independent | Clive Tovey | 1,845 | 5.8 | N/A |
| Plaid Cymru | Glyndwr Jones | 1,621 | 5.1 | −4.8 |
| BNP | Richard Barnes | 1,173 | 3.7 | N/A |
| UKIP | Adam Brown | 872 | 2.7 | +0.4 |
| Socialist Labour | Alan Cowdell | 195 | 0.6 | −0.3 |
| Rejected ballots | | 80 | | |
| Majority | | 4,056 | 12.7 | −33.8 |
| Turnout | | 32,076 | 58.6 | +3.2 |
| Registered electors | | 54,715 | | |
| Labour hold | | Swing | −16.9 | |

Of the 80 rejected ballots:

- 22 were either unmarked or it was uncertain who the vote was for.
- 57 voted for more than one candidate.
- 1 had writing or mark by which the voter could be identified.

General election 2015: Merthyr Tydfil and Rhymney
| Party | Candidate | Votes | % | ±% |
|---|---|---|---|---|
| Labour | Gerald Jones | 17,619 | 53.9 | +10.2 |
| UKIP | David Rowlands | 6,106 | 18.7 | +16.0 |
| Conservative | Bill Rees | 3,292 | 10.1 | +2.6 |
| Plaid Cymru | Rhayna Mann | 3,099 | 9.5 | +4.4 |
| Liberal Democrats | Bob Griffin | 1,351 | 4.1 | −26.9 |
| Green | Elspeth Parris | 603 | 1.8 | N/A |
| Independent | Eddy Blanche | 459 | 1.4 | N/A |
| Communist | Robert Griffiths | 186 | 0.6 | N/A |
| Rejected ballots | | 95 | | |
| Majority | | 11,513 | 35.2 | +22.5 |
| Turnout | | 32,715 | 53.0 | −5.6 |
| Registered electors | | 61,716 | | |
| Labour hold | | Swing | −2.8 | |

Of the 95 rejected ballots:

- 49 were either unmarked or it was uncertain who the vote was for.
- 46 voted for more than one candidate.

General election 2017: Merthyr Tydfil and Rhymney
| Party | Candidate | Votes | % | ±% |
|---|---|---|---|---|
| Labour | Gerald Jones | 22,407 | 66.8 | +12.9 |
| Conservative | Pauline Jorgensen | 6,073 | 18.1 | +8.0 |
| Plaid Cymru | Amy Kitcher | 2,740 | 8.2 | −1.3 |
| UKIP | David Rowlands | 1,484 | 4.4 | −14.3 |
| Liberal Democrats | Bob Griffin | 841 | 2.5 | −1.6 |
| Rejected ballots | | 71 | | |
| Majority | | 16,334 | 48.7 | +13.5 |
| Turnout | | 33,545 | 60.5 | +7.5 |
| Registered electors | | 55,463 | | |
| Labour hold | | Swing | +2.4 | |

Of the 71 rejected ballots:

- 41 were either unmarked or it was uncertain who the vote was for.
- 30 voted for more than one candidate.

General election 2019: Merthyr Tydfil and Rhymney
| Party | Candidate | Votes | % | ±% |
|---|---|---|---|---|
| Labour | Gerald Jones | 16,913 | 52.4 | −14.4 |
| Conservative | Sara Jones | 6,307 | 19.6 | +1.5 |
| Brexit Party | David Jones | 3,604 | 11.2 | N/A |
| Plaid Cymru | Mark Evans | 2,446 | 7.6 | −0.6 |
| Independent | David Hughes | 1,860 | 5.8 | N/A |
| Liberal Democrats | Brendan D’Cruz | 1,116 | 3.5 | +1.0 |
| Rejected ballots | | 83 | | |
| Majority | | 10,606 | 32.8 | −15.9 |
| Turnout | | 32,246 | 57.4 | −3.1 |
| Registered electors | | 56,322 | | |
| Labour hold | | Swing | −8.0 | |

Of the 83 rejected ballots:

- 23 voted for more than one candidate.
- 4 had writing or mark by which the voter could be identified.
- 56 had want of official mark.

== See also ==
- Merthyr Tydfil and Rhymney (Senedd constituency)
- List of parliamentary constituencies in Mid Glamorgan
- List of parliamentary constituencies in Wales
