= List of UK Parliament constituencies in Wales =

Map of the 32 constituencies, first contested at the 2024 election coloured by party colour of MP elected. Labour Party: 27 seats Plaid Cymru: 4 seats Liberal Democrats: 1 seat

Wales is divided into thirty-two constituencies of the Parliament of the United Kingdom, which elect Members of Parliament to the House of Commons.

At the 2024 United Kingdom general election in Wales, 27 Labour MPs, 4 Plaid Cymru MPs and 1 Liberal Democrat MP were elected. The Conservative Party lost all of their 13 MPs in Wales.

This is a decrease from forty constituencies, last used in the general election of December 2019 which had resulted in 22 of the Welsh constituencies being represented by Labour MPs, 14 by Conservative MPs, and 4 by Plaid Cymru MPs. The number of constituencies was reduced from 40 to 32, as part of the 2023 Periodic Review of Westminster constituencies, in which the Boundary Commission for Wales set the boundaries of the new constituencies, following a process starting in 2021 and concluding on 28 June 2023 when the final recommendations were published by the commission.

Until 2026, the devolved Senedd will continue using 40 constituencies as in the previous UK Parliament, but would later replace them with 16 Senedd constituencies comprising pairings of the 32 UK Parliament constituencies.

== Constituencies since 2024 ==
Labelled map of 2024 constituencies

₪ Labour

₡ Conservative ₽ Plaid Cymru ₺ Liberal Democrat ฿ Brexit Party/Reform UK ₲ Green Party

Constituency	Electorate	Majority	Member of Parliament	Nearest opposition	Map
Aberafan Maesteg	72,467	10,354	Stephen Kinnock ₪	Mark Griffiths ฿	
Alyn and Deeside	75,785	8,794	Mark Tami ₪	Vicki Roskams ฿	
Bangor Aberconwy	69,026	4,896	Claire Hughes ₪	Catrin Wager ₽	
Blaenau Gwent and Rhymney	71,079	12,183	Nick Smith ₪	Niamh Salkeld ₽	
Brecon, Radnor and Cwm Tawe	73,114	1,472	David Chadwick ₺	Fay Jones ₡	
Bridgend	73,152	8,595	Chris Elmore ₪	Caroline Jones ฿	
Caerfyrddin	74,003	4,535	Ann Davies ₽	Martha O'Neil ₪	
Caerphilly	74,878	6,419	Chris Evans ₪	Lindsay Whittle ₽	
Cardiff East	72,873	9,097	Jo Stevens ₪	Rodney Berman ₺	
Cardiff North	71,335	11,207	Anna McMorrin ₪	Joel Williams ₡	
Cardiff South and Penarth	72,613	11,767	Stephen Doughty ₪	Anthony Slaughter ₲	
Cardiff West	75,473	7,019	Alex Barros-Curtis ₪	Kiera Marshall ₽	
Ceredigion Preseli	74,094	14,789	Ben Lake ₽	Mark Williams ₺	
Clwyd East	76,637	4,622	Becky Gittins ₪	James Davies ₡	
Clwyd North	76,150	1,196	Gill German ₪	Darren Millar ₡	
Dwyfor Meirionnydd	72,533	15,876	Liz Saville Roberts ₽	Joanna Stallard ₪	
Gower	75,504	11,567	Tonia Antoniazzi ₪	Marc Jenkins ₡	
Llanelli	71,536	1,504	Nia Griffith ₪	Gareth Beer ฿	
Merthyr Tydfil and Aberdare	74,805	7,627	Gerald Jones ₪	Gareth Thomas ฿	
Mid and South Pembrokeshire	79,031	1,878	Henry Tufnell ₪	Stephen Crabb ₡	
Monmouthshire	73,500	3,338	Catherine Fookes ₪	David TC Davies ₡	
Montgomeryshire and Glyndŵr	74,039	3,815	Steve Witherden ₪	Oliver Lewis ฿	
Neath and Swansea East	76,347	6,627	Carolyn Harris ₪	Dai Richards ฿	
Newport East	76,683	9,009	Jessica Morden ₪	Tommy Short ฿	
Newport West and Islwyn	75,781	8,868	Ruth Jones ₪	Paul Taylor ฿	
Pontypridd	75,030	8,402	Alex Davies-Jones ₪	Steven Bayliss ฿	
Rhondda and Ogmore	73,960	7,790	Chris Bryant ₪	Darren James ฿	
Swansea West	73,116	8,515	Torsten Bell ₪	Patrick Benham-Crosswell ฿	
Torfaen	71,551	7,322	Nick Thomas-Symonds ₪	Ian Williams ฿	
Vale of Glamorgan	74,374	4,216	Kanishka Narayan ₪	Alun Cairns ₡	
Wrexham	69,544	5,948	Andrew Ranger ₪	Sarah Atherton ₡	
Ynys Môn	53,137	637	Llinos Medi ₽	Virginia Crosbie ₡	

== Constituencies until 2024 ==
₪ Labour ₡ Conservative ₽ Plaid Cymru ₺ Liberal Democrat ฿ Brexit Party/Reform UK ₦ Independent

Constituency	Electorate	Majority	Member of Parliament	Nearest opposition	Map
Aberavon	50,750	10,490	Stephen Kinnock ₪	Charlotte Lang ₡	.
Aberconwy	44,699	2,034	Robin Millar ₡	Emily Owen ₪	
Alyn and Deeside	62,789	213	Mark Tami ₪	Sanjoy Sen ₡	
Arfon	42,215	2,781	Hywel Williams ₽	Steffie Williams Roberts ₪	
Blaenau Gwent	50,739	8,647	Nick Smith ₪	Richard Taylor ฿	
Brecon and Radnorshire	55,490	7,131	Fay Jones ₡	Jane Dodds ₺	
Bridgend	63,303	1,157	Jamie Wallis ₡	Madeleine Moon ₪	
Caerphilly	63,166	6,833	Wayne David ₪	Jane Pratt ₡	
Cardiff Central	64,037	17,179	Jo Stevens ₪	Meirion Jenkins ₡	
Cardiff North	68,438	6,982	Anna McMorrin ₪	Mo Ali ₡	
Cardiff South and Penarth	78,837	12,737	Stephen Doughty ₪	Philippa Broom ₡	
Cardiff West	68,508	10,986	Kevin Brennan ₪	Carolyn Webster ₡	
Carmarthen East and Dinefwr	57,419	1,809	Jonathan Edwards ₦	David Darkin ₪	
Carmarthen West and South Pembrokeshire	59,158	7,745	Simon Hart ₡	Marc Tierney ₪	
Ceredigion	56,250	6,329	Ben Lake ₽	Amanda Jenner ₡	
Clwyd South	53,919	1,239	Simon Baynes ₡	Susan Elan Jones ₪	
Clwyd West	57,714	6,747	David Jones ₡	Jo Thomas ₪	
Cynon Valley	51,134	8,822	Beth Winter ₪	Pauline Church ₡	
Delyn	54,560	865	Rob Roberts ₦	David Hanson ₪	
Dwyfor Meirionnydd	44,362	4,740	Liz Saville-Roberts ₽	Tomos Davies ₡	
Gower	61,762	1,837	Tonia Antoniazzi ₪	Francesca O'Brien ₡	
Islwyn	55,423	5,464	Christopher James Evans ₪	Gavin Chambers ₡	
Llanelli	60,518	4,670	Nia Griffith ₪	Tamara Reay ₡	
Merthyr Tydfil and Rhymney	56,322	10,606	Gerald Jones ₪	Sara Jones ₡	
Monmouth	67,098	9,982	David Davies ₡	Yvonne Murphy ₪	
Montgomeryshire	48,997	12,138	Craig Williams ₡	Kishan Devani ₺	
Neath	56,419	5,637	Christina Rees ₪	Jon Burns ₡	
Newport East	58,554	1,992	Jessica Morden ₪	Mark Brown ₡	
Newport West	66,657	902	Ruth Jones ₪	Matthew Evans ₡	
Ogmore	57,581	7,805	Chris Elmore ₪	Sadie Vidal ₡	
Pontypridd	60,327	5,887	Alex Davies-Jones ₪	Sam Trask ₡	
Preseli Pembrokeshire	59,606	5,062	Stephen Crabb ₡	Philippa Thompson ₪	
Rhondda	50,262	11,440	Chris Bryant ₪	Hannah Jarvis	
Swansea East	58,450	11,440	Carolyn Harris ₪	Denise Howard ₡	
Swansea West	57,078	8,116	Geraint Davies₵	James Price ₡	
Torfaen	62,330	3,742	Nick Thomas-Symonds ₪	Graham Smith ₡	
Vale of Clwyd	56,649	1,827	James Davies ₡	Chris Ruane ₪	
Vale of Glamorgan	76,508	3,562	Alun Cairns ₡	Belinda Loveluck-Edwards ₪	
Wrexham	49,737	2,131	Sarah Atherton ₡	Mary Wimbury ₪	
Ynys Môn (Anglesey)	51,925	1,968	Virginia Crosbie ₡	Mary Roberts ₪	

== 2023 boundary changes ==
=== Failed sixth periodic review ===
Under the terms of the Parliamentary Voting System and Constituencies Act 2011, the Sixth Periodic Review of Westminster Constituencies (the 2018 review) was based on reducing the total number of MPs from 650 to 600 and a strict electoral parity requirement that the electorate of all constituencies should be within a range of 5% either side of the electoral quota.

The Boundary Commission for Wales submitted their final proposals in respect of the Sixth Review in September 2018. Although the proposals were immediately laid before Parliament they were not brought forward by the Government for approval. Accordingly, they did not come into effect for the 2019 election which took place on 12 December 2019, and which was contested using the constituency boundaries in place since 2010.

On 24 March 2020, the Minister of State for the Cabinet Office, Chloe Smith, issued a written statement to Parliament setting out the Government's thinking with regard to parliamentary boundaries. Subsequently, the Parliamentary Constituencies Act 2020 was passed into law on 14 December 2020 which formally removed the duty to implement the 2018 review and set out the framework for future boundary reviews.

=== 2023 periodic review ===
Maps of the 40 constituencies to be used up to 2024 (left), and the 32 constituencies from 2024.

The Parliamentary Constituencies Act 2020 was passed in December 2020, and the publication of the most recent data of electorate sizes of constituencies on 5 January 2021, lead the Boundary Commission for Wales to begin its review of the parliamentary constituencies in Wales, with the commission required to publish its final recommendations for boundary changes by 1 July 2023. By December 2021, the commission published the responses collected during the consultation period, and then conducted a six-week 'secondary consultation. Unlike the previous periodic review, the total UK constituencies was kept at 650.

When proportionally dividing the total 2021 electoral population of the United Kingdom using a statutory formula between the constituent countries of the UK, it results in England having 543 constituencies, Scotland having 57, Wales having 32 and Northern Ireland with the remaining 18. Each constituency recommended to have no more than 77,062 electors and no less than 69,724. The figure from Wales is calculated to be 8 seats lower from the total constituencies used for the 2019 UK general election when there were 40 constituencies, the largest decrease of any UK country or region. Wales has one 'protected constituency' not subject to UK electoral quotas, Ynys Môn on the Isle of Anglesey, where boundary changes are not applied. The decrease in constituencies in Wales has been described by the commission to represent "the most significant change to Wales's constituencies in a century", and the commission has no control over the number of constituencies in Wales. The final proposal published by the commission no longer required parliamentary approval and the recommendations in the final report were implemented automatically, however the second consultation period allowed public hearing about the proposals. The commission stated that it tried wherever possible to use existing local government boundaries, such as those of existing constituencies and principal areas.

==== Final recommendations ====
Labelled map of the 32 new constituencies in Wales to be used from the 2024 UK general election.

The final recommendations on the new constituencies in Wales were published on 28 June 2023 by the Boundary Commission for Wales. This followed years of proposals and consultations since 2021, with initial proposals published in 2021 and revised in 2022.

Categorisation of status is purely based on the names used by the constituencies, if a new constituency largely overlaps with a previous one but was renamed, it is considered a new constituency.

New – Did not exist previously with either the name or boundaries.
Expanded – Keeps name but gains wards.
Redefined – Keeps name but with other altered boundaries.
Revived – Former constituency revived under the same name(s).

List of recommended constituencies
Recommended constituency (Welsh name)	Electorate (2023)	Area (km^{2})	Electoral wards from		Status	Notes
Recommended constituency (Welsh name)	Electorate (2023)	Area (km^{2})	Previous constituency	Principal area	Status	Notes
Aberafan Maesteg	69,817	397	Bridgend (part)	Bridgend	New constituency	
Aberafan Maesteg	69,817	397	Ogmore (part)	Bridgend	New constituency	
Aberafan Maesteg	69,817	397	Aberavon (part)	Neath Port Talbot	New constituency	
Aberafan Maesteg	69,817	397	Neath (part)	Neath Port Talbot	New constituency	
Alyn and Deeside; Alun a Glannau Dyfrdwy	75,695	205	Alyn and Deeside (all)	Flintshire	Expanded constituency	
Alyn and Deeside; Alun a Glannau Dyfrdwy	75,695	205	Delyn (part)	Flintshire	Expanded constituency	
Bangor Aberconwy	70,468	1,435	Aberconwy (all)	Conwy	New constituency	
Bangor Aberconwy	70,468	1,435	Clwyd West (part)	Conwy	New constituency	
Bangor Aberconwy	70,468	1,435	Clwyd West (part)	Denbighshire	New constituency	
Bangor Aberconwy	70,468	1,435	Arfon (part)	Gwynedd	New constituency	
Blaenau Gwent and Rhymney; Blaenau Gwent a Rhymni	71,079	166	Blaenau Gwent (all)	Blaenau Gwent	New constituency	
Blaenau Gwent and Rhymney; Blaenau Gwent a Rhymni	71,079	166	Merthyr Tydfil and Rhymney (part)	Caerphilly	New constituency	
Blaenau Gwent and Rhymney; Blaenau Gwent a Rhymni	71,079	166	Islwyn (part)	Caerphilly	New constituency	
Blaenau Gwent and Rhymney; Blaenau Gwent a Rhymni	71,079	166	Caerphilly (part)	Caerphilly	New constituency	
Brecon, Radnor and Cwm Tawe; Aberhonddu, Maesyfed a Chwm Tawe	72,113	3,090	Brecon and Radnorshire (all)	Powys	New constituency	
Brecon, Radnor and Cwm Tawe; Aberhonddu, Maesyfed a Chwm Tawe	72,113	3,090	Neath (part)	Neath Port Talbot	New constituency	
Bridgend; Pen-y-bont	70,770	124	Bridgend (part)	Bridgend	Redefined constituency	
Bridgend; Pen-y-bont	70,770	124	Ogmore (part)	Bridgend	Redefined constituency	
Caerfyrddin	72,683	2,034	Carmarthen East and Dinefwr (part)	Carmarthenshire	Revived constituency	Previously existed 1542–1997 under its English name "Carmarthen".
Caerfyrddin	72,683	2,034	Carmarthen West and South Pembrokeshire (part)	Carmarthenshire	Revived constituency	Previously existed 1542–1997 under its English name "Carmarthen".
Caerphilly; Caerffili	72,458	140	Caerphilly (part)	Caerphilly	Redefined constituency	
Caerphilly; Caerffili	72,458	140	Islwyn (part)	Caerphilly	Redefined constituency	
Cardiff East; Dwyrain Caerdydd	72,463	33	Cardiff Central (part)	Cardiff	Revived constituency	Name restored; previously existed 1918–1950.
Cardiff East; Dwyrain Caerdydd	72,463	33	Cardiff South and Penarth (part)	Cardiff	Revived constituency	Name restored; previously existed 1918–1950.
Cardiff North; Gogledd Caerdydd	71,143	49	Cardiff North (all)	Cardiff	Expanded constituency	
Cardiff North; Gogledd Caerdydd	71,143	49	Pontypridd (part)	Rhondda Cynon Taf	Expanded constituency	
Cardiff South and Penarth; De Caerdydd a Phenarth	72,269	60	Cardiff South and Penarth (part)	Cardiff	Redefined constituency	
Cardiff South and Penarth; De Caerdydd a Phenarth	72,269	60	Cardiff Central (part)	Cardiff	Redefined constituency	
Cardiff South and Penarth; De Caerdydd a Phenarth	72,269	60	Cardiff South and Penarth (part)	Vale of Glamorgan	Redefined constituency	
Cardiff South and Penarth; De Caerdydd a Phenarth	72,269	60	Vale of Glamorgan (part)	Vale of Glamorgan	Redefined constituency	
Cardiff West; Gorllewin Caerdydd	73,947	63	Cardiff West (all)	Cardiff	Expanded constituency	
Cardiff West; Gorllewin Caerdydd	73,947	63	Pontypridd (part)	Rhondda Cynon Taf	Expanded constituency	
Ceredigion Preseli	74,063	2,458	Ceredigion (all)	Ceredigion	New constituency	
Ceredigion Preseli	74,063	2,458	Preseli Pembrokeshire (part)	Pembrokeshire	New constituency	
Clwyd East; Dwyrain Clwyd	76,395	676	Clwyd West (part)	Denbighshire	New constituency	
Clwyd East; Dwyrain Clwyd	76,395	676	Clwyd South (part)	Denbighshire	New constituency	
Clwyd East; Dwyrain Clwyd	76,395	676	Vale of Clwyd (part)	Denbighshire	New constituency	
Clwyd East; Dwyrain Clwyd	76,395	676	Delyn (part)	Flintshire	New constituency	
Clwyd East; Dwyrain Clwyd	76,395	676	Clwyd South (part)	Wrexham	New constituency	
Clwyd North; Gogledd Clwyd	76,150	170	Clwyd West (part)	Conwy	New constituency	
Clwyd North; Gogledd Clwyd	76,150	170	Vale of Clwyd (part)	Denbighshire	New constituency	
Dwyfor Meirionnydd	72,533	2,613	Clwyd South (part)	Denbighshire	Expanded constituency	
Dwyfor Meirionnydd	72,533	2,613	Dwyfor Meirionnydd (all)	Gwynedd	Expanded constituency	
Dwyfor Meirionnydd	72,533	2,613	Arfon (part)	Gwynedd	Expanded constituency	
Gower; Gŵyr	76,801	345	Gower (part)	Swansea	Redefined constituency	
Gower; Gŵyr	76,801	345	Swansea West (part)	Swansea	Redefined constituency	
Llanelli	69,895	397	Llanelli (all)	Carmarthenshire	Expanded constituency	
Llanelli	69,895	397	Carmarthen East and Dinefwr (part)	Carmarthenshire	Expanded constituency	
Merthyr Tydfil and Aberdare; Merthyr Tudful ac Aberdâr	74,805	245	Merthyr Tydfil and Rhymney (part)	Merthyr Tydfil (all)	New constituency	
Merthyr Tydfil and Aberdare; Merthyr Tudful ac Aberdâr	74,805	245	Cynon Valley (part)	Rhondda Cynon Taf	New constituency	
Mid and South Pembrokeshire; Canol a De Sir Benfro	76,820	985	Preseli Pembrokeshire (part)	Pembrokeshire	New constituency	
Mid and South Pembrokeshire; Canol a De Sir Benfro	76,820	985	Carmarthen West and South Pembrokeshire (part)	Pembrokeshire	New constituency	
Monmouthshire; Sir Fynwy	72,681	884	Monmouth (part)	Monmouthshire (all)	Revived constituency	Name restored; previously existed 1536–1885.
Monmouthshire; Sir Fynwy	72,681	884	Newport East (part)	Monmouthshire (all)	Revived constituency	Name restored; previously existed 1536–1885.
Montgomeryshire and Glyndŵr; Maldwyn a Glyndŵr	74,223	2,379	Montgomeryshire (all)	Powys	New constituency	
Montgomeryshire and Glyndŵr; Maldwyn a Glyndŵr	74,223	2,379	Clwyd South (part)	Wrexham	New constituency	
Neath and Swansea East; Castell-nedd a Dwyrain Abertawe	74,705	219	Aberavon (part)	Neath Port Talbot	New constituency	
Neath and Swansea East; Castell-nedd a Dwyrain Abertawe	74,705	219	Neath (part)	Neath Port Talbot	New constituency	
Neath and Swansea East; Castell-nedd a Dwyrain Abertawe	74,705	219	Gower (part)	Swansea	New constituency	
Neath and Swansea East; Castell-nedd a Dwyrain Abertawe	74,705	219	Swansea East (part)	Swansea	New constituency	
Newport East; Dwyrain Casnewydd	76,159	142	Newport East (part)	Newport	Redefined constituency	
Newport East; Dwyrain Casnewydd	76,159	142	Newport West (part)	Newport	Redefined constituency	
Newport West and Islwyn; Gorllewin Casnewydd ac Islwyn	76,234	154	Newport West (part)	Newport	New constituency	
Newport West and Islwyn; Gorllewin Casnewydd ac Islwyn	76,234	154	Islwyn (part)	Caerphilly	New constituency	
Pontypridd	73,743	141	Cynon Valley (part)	Rhondda Cynon Taf	Redefined constituency	
Pontypridd	73,743	141	Ogmore (part)	Rhondda Cynon Taf	Redefined constituency	
Pontypridd	73,743	141	Pontypridd (part)	Rhondda Cynon Taf	Redefined constituency	
Rhondda and Ogmore; Rhondda ac Ogwr	73,557	199	Ogmore (part)	Bridgend	New constituency	
Rhondda and Ogmore; Rhondda ac Ogwr	73,557	199	Ogmore (part)	Rhondda Cynon Taf	New constituency	
Rhondda and Ogmore; Rhondda ac Ogwr	73,557	199	Pontypridd (part)	Rhondda Cynon Taf	New constituency	
Rhondda and Ogmore; Rhondda ac Ogwr	73,557	199	Rhondda (all)	Rhondda Cynon Taf	New constituency	
Swansea West; Gorllewin Abertawe	74,612	35	Swansea East (part)	Swansea	Redefined constituency	
Swansea West; Gorllewin Abertawe	74,612	35	Swansea West (part)	Swansea	Redefined constituency	
Torfaen	70,591	126	Torfaen (all)	Torfaen (all)	Expanded constituency	
Torfaen	70,591	126	Monmouth (part)	Torfaen (all)	Expanded constituency	
Vale of Glamorgan; Bro Morgannwg	70,426	301	Vale of Glamorgan (part)	Vale of Glamorgan	Redefined constituency	
Wrexham; Wrecsam	70,964	292	Clwyd South (part)	Wrexham	Expanded constituency	
Wrexham; Wrecsam	70,964	292	Wrexham (all)	Wrexham	Expanded constituency	
Ynys Môn	52,415	746	Ynys Môn (all)	Isle of Anglesey (all)	Protected constituency	Constituency not subject to the statutory UK electoral quota.

== 2024 results ==
The number of votes cast for each political party who fielded candidates in constituencies in Wales at the 2024 general election were as follows:

Party	Votes	%	Change from 2019	Seats	Change from 2019 (actual)	Change from 2019 (notional)
Labour	487,636	37.0	▼3.9	27	▲5	▲9
Conservative	240,003	18.2	▼17.9	0	▼14	▼12
Reform UK	223,018	16.9	▲11.5	0	0	0
Plaid Cymru	194,811	14.7	▲4.8	4	0	▲2
Liberal Democrats	85,911	6.5	▲0.5	1	▲1	▲1
Green	61,662	4.7	▲3.7	0	0	0
Others	26,035	2.0	▲1.3	0	0	0
Total	1,319,076	100.0		32	▼8	

== Results history ==
Primary data source: House of Commons research briefing – General election results from 1918 to 2019 (2024 as above)

=== Percentage votes ===
Wales votes %

Key:

- CON – Conservative Party, including National Liberal Party up to 1966
- LAB – Labour Party, including Labour and Co-operative Party
- LIB – Liberal Party up to 1979; SDP-Liberal Alliance 1983 & 1987; Liberal Democrats from 1992
- PC – Plaid Cymru
- UKIP – UK Independence Party 2010 to 2017 (included in Other up to 2005 and from 2019)
- REF - Reform UK (2019 - Brexit Party)
- GRN – Green Party of England and Wales (included in Other up to 2005)

=== Seats ===
Wales seats won

Key:

- CON – Conservative Party, including National Liberal Party up to 1966
- LAB – Labour Party, including Labour and Co-operative Party
- LIB – Liberal Party up to 1979; SDP-Liberal Alliance 1983 & 1987; Liberal Democrats from 1992
- PC – Plaid Cymru
- OTH – 1970 – Independent (S. O. Davies); 2005 – Independent (Peter Law)

=== Maps ===
2010

2015

2017

2019 by-elections

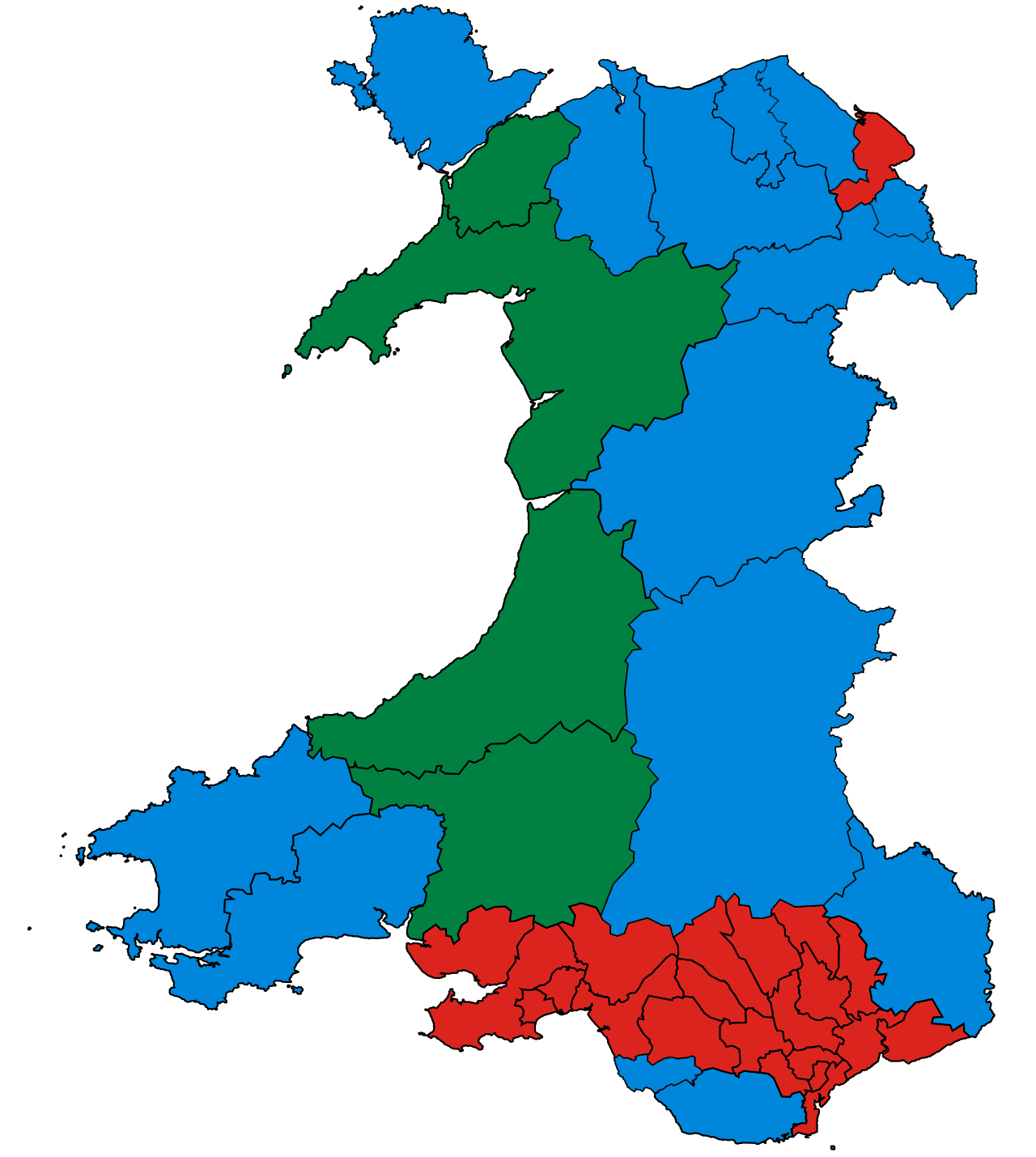
December 2019

2024

These are maps of the results of the last four general elections in Wales and changes in 2019 following a by-election and a change of affiliation.

- Red represents the Labour Party's MPs.
- Blue represents the Conservative Party's MPs.
- Amber represents the Liberal Democrats' MPs.
- Green represents Plaid Cymru's MPs.
- Grey represents Independent MPs.

=== 2019 by-elections ===
Two by-elections were held in 2019:

- 2019 Newport West by-election
- 2019 Brecon and Radnorshire by-election

== See also ==
- List of parliamentary constituencies in Clwyd
- List of parliamentary constituencies in Dyfed
- List of parliamentary constituencies in Gwent
- List of parliamentary constituencies in Gwynedd
- List of parliamentary constituencies in Mid Glamorgan
- List of parliamentary constituencies in Powys
- List of parliamentary constituencies in South Glamorgan
- List of parliamentary constituencies in West Glamorgan
- Senedd constituencies and electoral regions
