= Gwilym Jones =

British politician

Member of Parliament for Cardiff North
- In office 9 June 1983 – 8 April 1997
- Preceded by: Ian Grist
- Succeeded by: Julie Morgan

Parliamentary Under-Secretary of State for Wales
- In office 20 July 1994 – 2 May 1997; Alongside Rod Richards then Jonathan Evans
- Prime Minister: John Major
- Succeeded by: Peter Hain & Win Griffiths

Personal details
- Born: 20 September 1947 (age 79) Chiswick, London, England
- Party: Conservative
- Children: Fay Jones

Gwilym Haydn Jones (born 20 September 1947) is a British Conservative politician who served as Under Secretary of State in the Welsh Office.

== Early life ==
Gwilym Jones was born in Chiswick, London, on 20 September 1947 and moved to Cardiff in 1960. He worked as an insurance broker. When he was 21 he was elected to Cardiff City Council, and is believed to be its youngest ever member. He became deputy leader and acting leader of the Conservative group on the council.

== Parliament ==
At the 1983 general election, he was elected as Member of Parliament for Cardiff North. He retained his seat until the 1997 election, when was defeated by Labour's Julie Morgan. Between 1994 and 1997 he served as Under Secretary of State in the Welsh Office.

== Personal life ==
Jones is active in freemasonry. His daughter, Fay Jones, was elected in 2019 to serve Brecon and Radnorshire after beating Liberal Democrat incumbent Jane Dodds. In 2023, she was appointed to his previous role as Parliamentary Under Secretary of State for Wales.

His wife Linda died on 28 February 2022, aged 75.

== Offices held ==
Parliament of the United Kingdom
| Preceded by Ian Grist | Member of Parliament for Cardiff North; 1983–1997 | Succeeded by Julie Morgan |
