= Fay Jones (politician) =

British politician (born 1985)

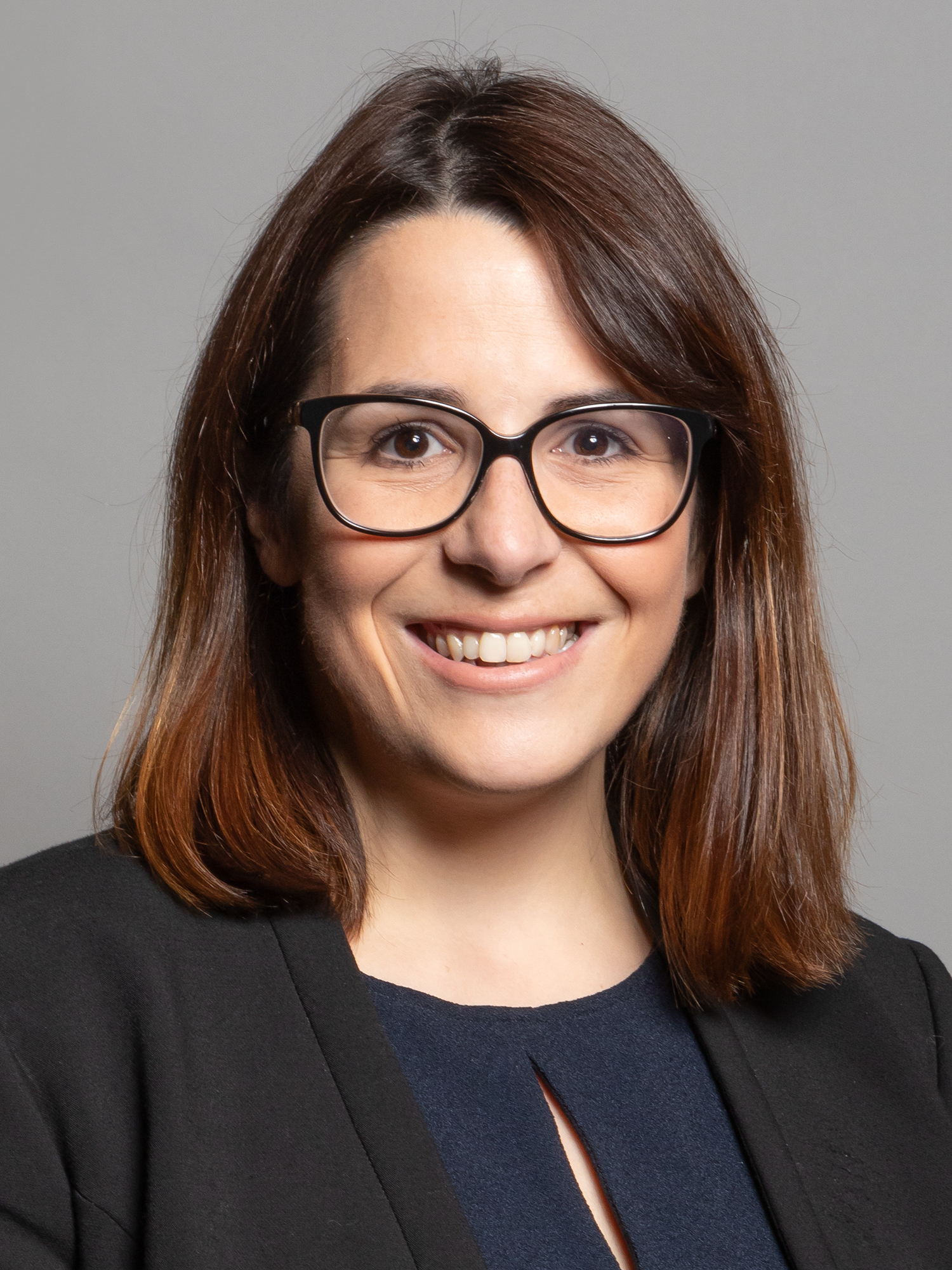
- Official portrait, 2020

Parliamentary Under-Secretary of State for Wales
- In office 13 November 2023 – 5 July 2024
- Prime Minister: Rishi Sunak
- Preceded by: James Davies
- Succeeded by: Nia Griffith

Assistant Government Whip
- In office 27 October 2022 – 13 November 2023
- Prime Minister: Rishi Sunak

Member of Parliament for Brecon and Radnorshire
- In office 12 December 2019 – 30 May 2024
- Preceded by: Jane Dodds
- Succeeded by: Constituency abolished

Personal details
- Born: 18 January 1985 (age 41) Cardiff, Wales
- Party: Conservative
- Spouse: Tim Poole (m. 2023)
- Parent: Gwilym Jones (father)
- Education: King's College London
- Website: fayjones.org.uk

Fay Alicia Jones (born 18 January 1985) is a British former politician who served as the Member of Parliament (MP) for Brecon and Radnorshire from 2019 to 2024. She is a member of the Conservative Party and a former junior government minister.

== Early life and education ==
Fay Jones was born in Cardiff in 1985. Her father is Gwilym Jones, who at the time of her birth was the Conservative MP for Cardiff North. She studied French at King's College London.

After graduating from university, Jones' first job was as a researcher for Charles, Prince of Wales. In 2012, she moved to the Department for Environment, Food and Rural Affairs to join the UK negotiating team in the 2011 Common Agricultural Policy reform. She then worked for the National Farmers' Union and for the public relations firm Grayling. Before the 2019 general election she was chair of Public Affairs Cymru, a membership organisation for professionals working in public affairs.

== Political career ==
In politics, Jones worked for the Conservative Member of the European Parliament Jonathan Evans and the Conservative MP David Jones. In 2019 she was a volunteer in Boris Johnson's campaign for leadership of the Conservative Party. She was third on the party-list in Wales for the Conservatives at the 2019 European Parliament election.

Jones was elected as MP for Brecon and Radnorshire in the 2019 general election, beating the Liberal Democrat incumbent Jane Dodds, who had been the leader of the Welsh Liberal Democrats since 2017. Dodds had won the seat in a by-election in August 2019, which had been triggered by a recall petition after the Conservative MP Chris Davies was convicted for submitting a false expenses claim.

Jones has served as Parliamentary private secretary (PPS) to the Department for Environment, Food and Rural Affairs. She established the All-Party Parliamentary Group for Farming. In February 2022, she was made PPS to Mark Spencer, the leader of the House of Commons. She resigned as a PPS during the July 2022 United Kingdom government crisis.

Jones endorsed Rishi Sunak during the July–September 2022 Conservative Party leadership election.

Jones served as the Parliamentary private secretary (PPS) to Thérèse Coffey, the Deputy Prime Minister between September and October 2022 before being appointed as an Assistant Government Whip by Rishi Sunak a position in which she served until November 2023 when she joined the Wales Office as Parliamentary Under-Secretary of State, the same role that her father held between 1994 and 1997.

Jones contested the altered constituency of Brecon, Radnor and Cwm Tawe at the 2024 general election, but was not elected, with the Welsh Liberal Democrat candidate David Chadwick winning the seat with a majority of 1,472 votes.

== Post-parliamentary career ==
Poole-Jones has been appointed Director of External Affairs for the Crown Estate. In July 2025, she said: "A year ago today, I lost my seat at the General Election. And I’m starting to think that being chucked out of Parliament was one of the best things to ever happen to me. Once I got over the initial sadness (a process not always complete) I found more time for the things, and the people, I genuinely love. Eventually, I found a role which is stretching and rewarding in equal measure. And now I have exciting plans for the future which aren’t contingent on Nigel Farage - a blessed relief."

== Personal life ==
Jones lives near Crickhowell, Powys. On 4 November 2023 she married, at Brecon Cathedral, her long-term partner Tim Poole, who serves in the British Army.

Parliament of the United Kingdom
Preceded by Jane Dodds	Member of Parliament for Brecon and Radnorshire; 2019–2024	Succeeded by Constituency abolished
Political offices
Preceded by James Davies	Parliamentary Under-Secretary of State for Wales; 2023–2024	Succeeded by Nia Griffith
