= Jon Owen Jones =

British politician (born 1954)

Member of Parliament for Cardiff Central
- In office 9 April 1992 – 11 April 2005
- Preceded by: Ian Grist
- Succeeded by: Jenny Willott

Parliamentary Under-Secretary of State for Wales
- In office 29 July 1998 – 29 July 1999; Alongside Peter Hain
- Preceded by: Win Griffiths
- Succeeded by: Office Abolished

Lord Commissioner of the Treasury
- In office 6 May 1997 – 28 July 1998
- Prime Minister: Tony Blair
- Preceded by: Patrick McLoughlin
- Succeeded by: David Jamieson

Personal details
- Born: 19 April 1954 (age 72) Maerdy
- Party: Independent
- Other political affiliations: Labour Co-operative (until 2019); Change UK (2019)
- Spouse: Allison Owen Jones
- Children: Rhys Jones, Owen Jones, Bronwen Jones
- Education: University of East Anglia, Cardiff University

Jonathan Owen Jones (born 19 April 1954) is a Welsh politician. He was the Labour and Co-operative Member of Parliament for Cardiff Central from 1992 to 2005. He was then an unsuccessful candidate for Change UK in Wales at the 2019 European Parliament election.

== Early life ==
Jon Owen Jones was born in Maerdy. He attended the Ysgol Gyfun Rhydfelen school on Glyndwr Avenue in Rhydyfelin, Pontypridd. He studied at the University of East Anglia, gaining a BSc in Ecology in 1975. In 1976 he went to University College of Wales, Cardiff, gaining a PGCE. Jones was a teacher before entering Parliament, teaching biology and science in comprehensive schools from 1977 to 1992. He was president of Caerphilly NUT in 1983, then Mid Glamorgan NUT in 1984. He was a councillor for the Adamsdown ward on Cardiff City Council from 1987 to 1992.

== Parliamentary career ==
Jones was the Labour and Co-operative MP for the Cardiff Central constituency from 1992 to 2005. He was a whip from 1993 to 1998, then a junior minister at the Welsh Office until 1999. He won his seat again in 2001 with a majority of 659. He lost his seat at the 2005 general election to Jenny Willott of the Liberal Democrats.

As part of the investigation into United Kingdom parliamentary expenses scandal, Jones was found to have over claimed £513.10.

== Post-parliament ==
He chaired the Forestry Commission's National Committee for Wales until April 2013, when its duties were subsumed by Natural Resources Wales, with Jones snubbed from the NRW board by Welsh Labour Environment Minister John Griffiths.

In April 2019, It was announced that he would be the lead candidate for Change UK in Wales in the 2019 European Elections. He was not elected.

== Offices Held ==
Parliament of the United Kingdom
Preceded by Ian Grist	Member of Parliament for Cardiff Central; 1992–2005	Succeeded by Jenny Willott
