= Parliamentary Under-Secretary of State for Wales =

Junior office of the UK Government

United Kingdom Parliamentary Under-Secretary of State for Wales
- Royal Arms of His Majesty's Government

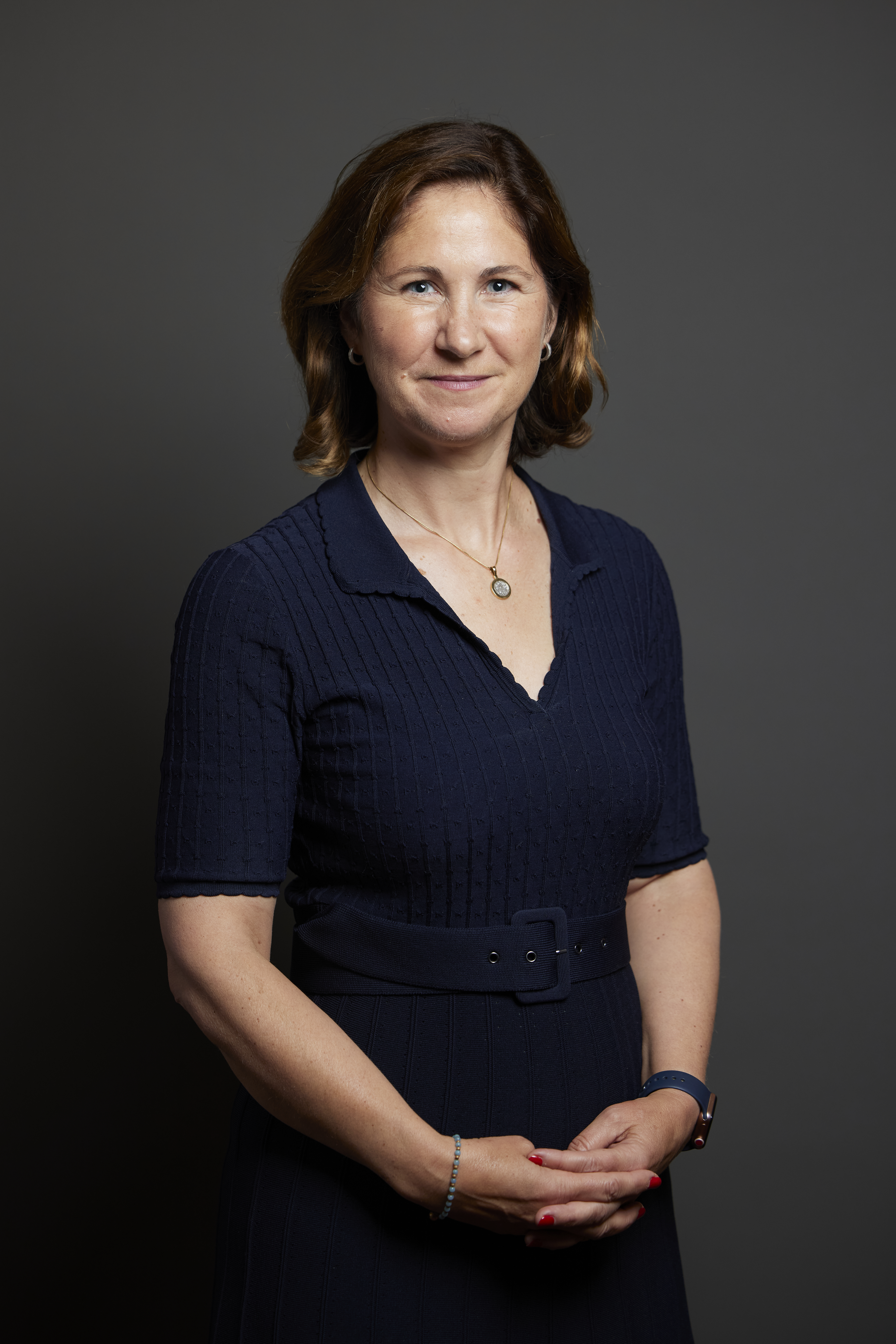
- Incumbent; Anna McMorrin since 7 September 2025
- Wales Office
- Appointer: The King (on the advice of the Prime Minister)
- Term length: At His Majesty's pleasure
- Inaugural holder: Goronwy Roberts
- Formation: 17 October 1964
- Website: Wales Office

The Parliamentary Under-Secretary of State for Wales (Welsh: Is-ysgrifennydd Gwladol Seneddol Cymru), often referred to simply as the Welsh Office Minister, is a junior ministerial post (of Parliamentary Under-Secretary of State rank) in the Government of the United Kingdom, supporting the Secretary of State for Wales.

== History ==
A post of Minister of Welsh Affairs was created in 1951 under the Home Secretary and was upgraded to Minister of State level in 1954. On 17 October 1964 The post was further upgraded to Secretary of State for Wales, which was a cabinet level role, being assisted by a junior minister.

Between 1964 and the establishment of devolution in 1999 there were regularly two junior ministers within the Welsh Office, often but not always consisting of a Minister of State and a Parliamentary Under-Secretary of State, with each assigned specific roles (health, education etc.). Following devolution and the transfer of powers from Westminster to the National Assembly, there was only one Under-Secretary of State working directly with the Secretary of State.

A second (and unpaid) Parliamentary Under-Secretary of State role was created in 2012 during the Coalition Government with one minister serving in the Commons and one in the Lords. This situation was maintained following the 2015 general election with two Under-Secretaries of State, one being paid by the Welsh Office and one unpaid (or paid by another government department for a joint role). Following the appointment of Boris Johnson as Prime Minister, Nick Bourne resigned and no replacement Minister was appointed.

== Ministers of Welsh Affairs (1951–1964) ==
For a list of ministers of Welsh affairs see: Ministers of Welsh Affairs (1951–1964)

== Minister of State for Wales in the House of Commons (1964–1999) ==
- 1964–1966 Goronwy Roberts
- 1966–1969 Ifor Davies
- 1967–1970 Eirene White
- 1970–1974 David Gibson-Watt
- 1974–1983 None. Two Under-Secretary of States for Wales existed, see below
- 1983–1987 John Stradling Thomas
- 1987–1994 Wyn Roberts
- 1994–1999 None. Two Under-Secretary of States for Wales were created, see below

== Parliamentary Under-Secretary of Wales in the House of Commons (1974–1999) ==
- 13 October 1969 to 19 June 1970 Edward Rowlands
- 1970-1974 ???
- 1974–1976 Alec Jones & Barry Jones
- 1976–1979 Alec Jones & Edward Rowlands
- 1979–1983 Wyn Roberts & Michael Roberts
- 1983–1985 Wyn Roberts & John Stradling Thomas
- 1985–1987 Wyn Roberts & Mark Robinson
- 15 June 1987 – 28 November 1990 Ian Grist
- 3 December 1990 – 20 July 1992 Nicholas Bennett
- 20 July 1994 – 2 June 1996 Gwilym Jones & Rod Richards
- 2 June 1996 – 2 May 1997 Gwilym Jones & Jonathan Evans
- 2 May 1997 – 28 July 1998 and Peter Hain and Win Griffiths
- 29 July 1998 – 29 July 1999 Peter Hain and Jon Owen Jones

== Junior Welsh Office Ministers in the House of Commons (1999–present) ==
Colour key
Labour Conservative

=== Parliamentary Under-Secretary of Wales in the House of Commons (1999–present) ===
Name	Portrait	Term of office		Political party	P.M.	Welsh Sec.
David Hanson		29 July 1999	11 June 2001	Labour	Tony Blair	Peter Hain
Don Touhig		11 June 2001	May 2005	Labour	Tony Blair	Peter Hain
Nick Ainger		May 2005	27 June 2007	Labour	Tony Blair	Peter Hain
Huw Irranca-Davies		29 June 2007	5 October 2008	Labour	Gordon Brown	Peter Hain & Paul Murphy
Wayne David		5 October 2008	11 May 2010	Labour	Gordon Brown	Paul Murphy &Peter Hain
David Jones		11 May 2010	4 September 2012	Conservative	David Cameron	Cheryl Gillan
Stephen Crabb; Also served as an Assistant Government Whip		4 September 2012	15 July 2014	Conservative	David Cameron	David Jones
Alun Cairns		15 July 2014	19 March 2016	Conservative	David Cameron	Stephen Crabb
Guto Bebb		19 March 2016	9 January 2018	Conservative	David Cameron	Alun Cairns
Guto Bebb		19 March 2016	9 January 2018	Conservative	Theresa May	Alun Cairns
Stuart Andrew		9 January 2018	19 July 2018	Conservative	Theresa May	Alun Cairns
Mims Davies; Unpaid by Wales Office. Also serving as Assistant Government Whip		26 July 2018	5 November 2018	Conservative	Theresa May	Alun Cairns
Nigel Adams; Unpaid by Wales Office. Also serving as Assistant Government Whip		5 November 2018	3 April 2019	Conservative	Theresa May	Alun Cairns
Kevin Foster; Unpaid by Wales Office. Also serving as Assistant Government Whip		4 April 2019	16 December 2019	Conservative	Theresa May	Alun Cairns
Kevin Foster; Unpaid by Wales Office. Also serving as Assistant Government Whip		4 April 2019	16 December 2019	Conservative	Boris Johnson	Alun Cairns
David Davies Also serving as Assistant Government Whip 13 February 2020 – 25 July 2022 Lord Commissioner of the Treasury 25 July 2022 – 8 September 2022 (Unpaid by Wales Office during this time)		16 December 2019	25 October 2022	Conservative	Boris Johnson	Simon Hart
David Davies Also serving as Assistant Government Whip 13 February 2020 – 25 July 2022 Lord Commissioner of the Treasury 25 July 2022 – 8 September 2022 (Unpaid by Wales Office during this time)		16 December 2019	25 October 2022	Conservative	Boris Johnson	Robert Buckland
David Davies Also serving as Assistant Government Whip 13 February 2020 – 25 July 2022 Lord Commissioner of the Treasury 25 July 2022 – 8 September 2022 (Unpaid by Wales Office during this time)		16 December 2019	25 October 2022	Conservative	Liz Truss	Robert Buckland
James Davies		27 October 2022	13 November 2023	Conservative	Rishi Sunak	David Davies
Fay Jones		13 November 2023	5 July 2024	Conservative	Rishi Sunak	David Davies
Nia Griffith		9 July 2024	7 September 2025	Labour	Sir Keir Starmer	Jo Stevens
Anna McMorrin		7 September 2025	Incumbent	Labour	Sir Keir Starmer	Jo Stevens

== Junior Welsh Office Ministers in the House of Lords (2012–present) ==
Colour key
Conservative Liberal Democrats

=== Parliamentary Under-Secretary of Wales in the House of Lords (2012–present) ===
Name	Portrait	Term of office		Political party	Prime Minister	Secretary of State
Jennifer Randerson, Baroness Randerson; Unpaid		5 September 2012	8 May 2015	Liberal Democrats	David Cameron (Coalition)	David Jones & Stephen Crabb
Nick Bourne, Lord Bourne of Aberystwyth Also served as Parliamentary Under-Secretary of State for Energy and Climate Change (2015–16) and for Housing,Communities and Local Government (from 2016)		12 May 2015	17 June 2017	Conservative	David Cameron (II); Theresa May (I)	Stephen Crabb & Alun Cairns
Ian Duncan, Baron Duncan of Springbank Also served as Parliamentary Under-Secretary of State for Scotland		17 June 2017	27 November 2017	Conservative	Theresa May (II)	Alun Cairns
Nick Bourne, Lord Bourne of Aberystwyth And Parliamentary Under-Secretary of State for Housing, Communities and Local Government		27 November 2017	26 July 2019	Conservative	Theresa May (II)	Alun Cairns
Office not in use		26 July 2019	Present	Conservative		

== Notes ==
1.Promoted to Minister of State in 1987.

== See also ==
- Under-Secretary of State for Scotland
- Secretary of State for Wales
- First Minister for Wales
