= Ian Grist =

British politician (1938–2002)

Member of Parliament for Cardiff Central
- In office 9 June 1983 – 16 March 1992
- Preceded by: new constituency
- Succeeded by: Jon Owen Jones

Member of Parliament for Cardiff North
- In office 28 February 1974 – 13 May 1983
- Preceded by: Michael Roberts
- Succeeded by: Gwilym Jones

Parliamentary Under-Secretary of State for Wales
- In office 5 June 1987 – 28 November 1990
- Preceded by: Mark Robinson
- Succeeded by: Nicholas Bennett

Personal details
- Born: 5 December 1938 Southampton, England
- Died: 2 January 2002 (aged 63) Cardiff, Wales
- Party: Conservative
- Spouse: Wendy White (m. 1966)
- Children: 2
- Education: Jesus College, Oxford

Ian Grist (5 December 1938 – 2 January 2002) was a British Conservative politician.

Grist was Member of Parliament (MP) for Cardiff North from February 1974 to 1983, and for Cardiff Central from 1983 until 1992. He also served as a Minister in the Wales Office between June 1987 and November 1990.

== Early life ==
Grist was born in Southampton. First he went to prep school in Broadstairs, Kent, after which he was sent to Repton School. Having won a scholarship he studied history at Jesus College, Oxford, from 1957 to 1960. He had joined the Young Conservatives in 1956 and in Oxford became Jesus College Conservative Association's secretary.

== Career ==
At first Grist wanted a career as a colonial administrator. In 1960 he went to the Southern Cameroons as a plebiscite officer, and in 1961 he moved to Nigeria, working as a manager for the United Africa Company. In 1963 he returned to Britain.

On his return he became the Tories' Welsh political education officer, and worked for the party as a researcher from 1970 to 1974. In the 1970 general election he stood for election in Aberavon, a Labour stronghold, and lost. However, he won the marginal Cardiff North constituency in the February 1974 election.

=== Member of Parliament ===
Grist was known as a very assiduous Member of Parliament, who worked hard for his constituents and preferred to handle their complaints, rather than focus on his career. This enabled him to hold off several challenges in his marginal seat. When the Tories returned to power in 1979 he was appointed Parliamentary Private Secretary to Nicholas Edwards, the new Welsh Secretary, but he resigned in 1981. He returned to focusing on local issues.

Following boundary changes Grist stood for Cardiff Central in the 1983 general election and won. In the 1987 election he held the seat by fewer than 2000 votes in what was the "closest three-way contest in Wales".

In 1987 Margaret Thatcher surprisingly appointed him Parliamentary Under-Secretary of State for Wales, a post for which his signature posed a problem ("I. Grist" signifying "Jesus Christ" in Welsh), and remained in the position until he was sacked by John Major in 1990. In the 1992 general election he lost Cardiff Central to Labour Co-operative candidate Jon Owen Jones.

=== Outside Parliament ===
After losing his seat Grist was made the chairman of South Glamorgan Health Authority, a post he held until 1996, when he retired due to ill health. His appointment was regarded as controversial.

== Political views ==
While in opposition, Grist attacked Welsh devolution, unions, pop festivals and Neil Kinnock, whom he described as "neo-Marxist". Under Thatcher he opposed the poll tax and the privatisation of water companies. He also supported the British-American alliance. In social matters, he opposed the death penalty, restrictions on abortion, and school corporal punishment. A pro-European, he supported Michael Heseltine's leadership challenge.

== Personal life and death ==
In 1966 he married Wendy White. They had two sons, Julian and Toby.

On the second day of 2002, Grist died in Cardiff of a stroke at the age of 63.

Parliament of the United Kingdom
Preceded by Michael Roberts	Member of Parliament for Cardiff North; February 1974–1983	Succeeded by Gwilym Jones
New constituency	Member of Parliament for Cardiff Central; 1983–1992	Succeeded by Jon Owen Jones
