= List of UK Parliament constituencies in South Glamorgan =

Until the 2024 general election the preserved county of South Glamorgan was divided into five parliamentary constituencies: four borough constituencies and one county constituency. The boundaries had been effective since the 2007 National Assembly for Wales election and the 2010 United Kingdom general election.

== Constituencies ==
Name
1. Cardiff Central BC
2. Cardiff North BC
3. Cardiff South and Penarth BC
4. Cardiff West BC
5. Vale of Glamorgan CC*
6. Bridgend CC (part)
7. Pontypridd CC (part)

* Pre-2010: a small part lay in Mid Glamorgan and
a part of Ogmore constituency, too small to show,
was within South Glamorgan.

1997 to 2010

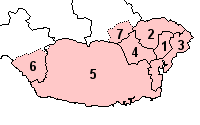
Parliamentary constituencies in South Glamorgan pre-2010

From 2010

Parliamentary constituencies in South Glamorgan 2010

The Vale of Glamorgan constituency was formed out of the Barry constituency in 1983, with Penarth supplementing abolished Cardiff South to become Cardiff South and Penarth.

Conservative † Labour ‡

Constituency	Electorate	Majority	Member of Parliament	Nearest opposition	Map reference above
Cardiff Central BC	64,037	17,179	Jo Stevens ‡	Meirion Jenkins †	1
Cardiff North BC	68,438	6,982	Anna McMorrin ‡	Mo Ali †	2
Cardiff South and Penarth BC	78,837	12,737	Stephen Doughty ‡	Philippa Broom †	3
Cardiff West BC	68,508	10,986	Kevin Brennan ‡	Carolyn Webster	4
Vale of Glamorgan CC	76,508	3,562	Alun Cairns †	Belinda Loveluck-Edwards ‡	5

== Proposed boundary changes ==
The Boundary Commission for Wales submitted their final proposals in respect of the Sixth Periodic Review of Westminster Constituencies (the 2018 review) in September 2018. Under the terms of the Parliamentary Voting System and Constituencies Act 2011, the Sixth Review was based on reducing the total number of MPs from 650 to 600 and a strict electoral parity requirement that the electorate of all constituencies should be within a range of 5% either side of the electoral quota. The review was due to report no later than October 2023.

== See also ==
- List of parliamentary constituencies in Wales
- List of parliamentary constituencies in West Glamorgan for historical representation by party for the whole of Glamorgan
