= Nia Griffith =

Welsh politician (born 1956)

Dame Nia Griffith DBE MP
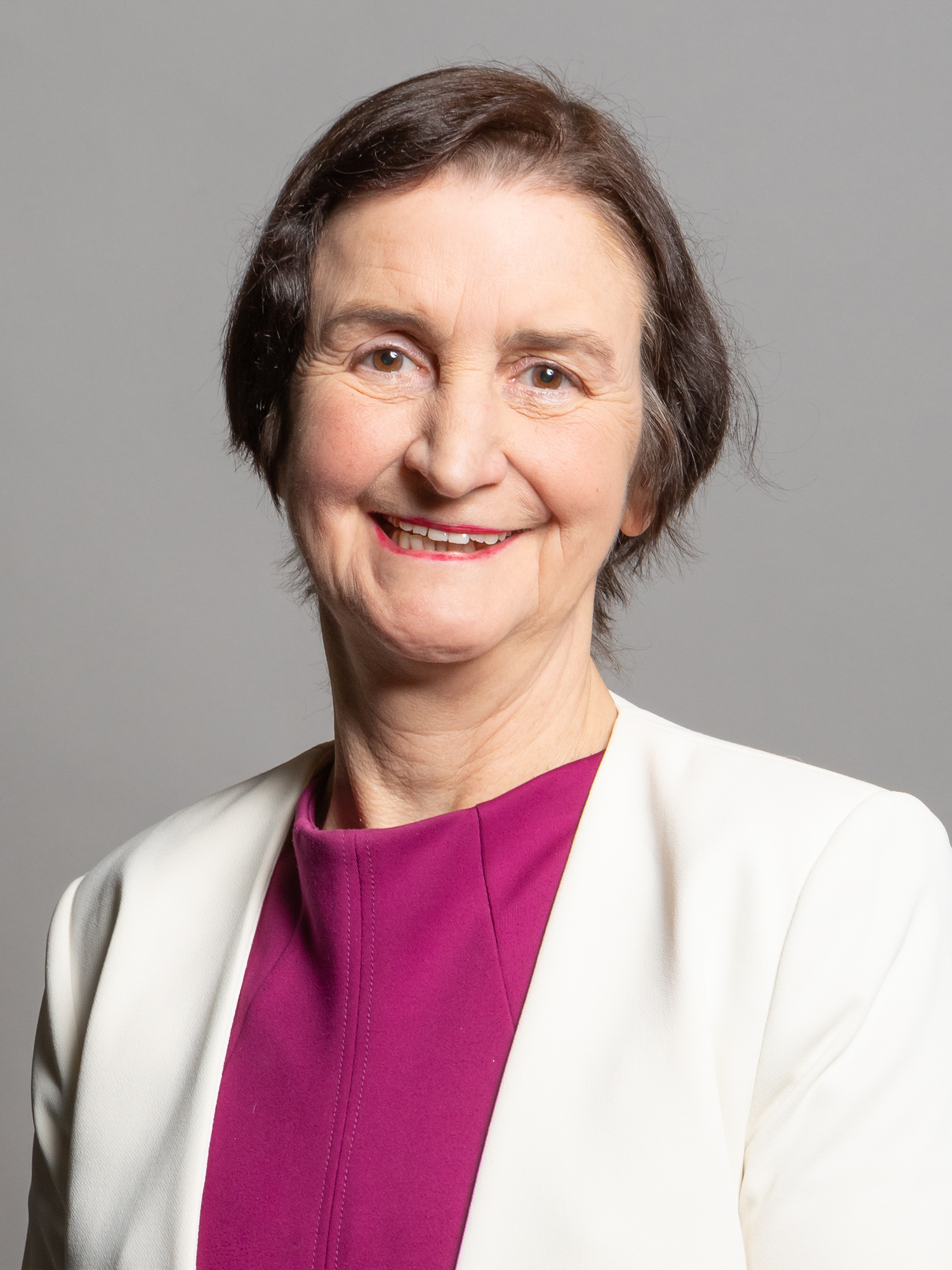
- Official portrait, 2020

Parliamentary Under-Secretary of State for Equalities
- In office 8 October 2024 – 7 September 2025
- Prime Minister: Keir Starmer
- Preceded by: Stuart Andrew
- Succeeded by: Olivia Bailey

Parliamentary Under-Secretary of State for Wales
- In office 9 July 2024 – 7 September 2025
- Prime Minister: Keir Starmer
- Preceded by: Fay Jones
- Succeeded by: Anna McMorrin; Claire Hughes
Shadow portfolios
Shadow Secretary of State
2020–2021	Wales
2016–2020	Defence
2015–2016	Wales
Shadow Minister
2023–2024	Cabinet Office
2021–2023	Exports
2011–2015	Wales
2010–2011	Business

Member of Parliament for Llanelli
- Incumbent
- Assumed office 5 May 2005
- Preceded by: Denzil Davies
- Majority: 1,504 (3.7%)

Personal details
- Born: Nia Rhiannon Griffith; 4 December 1956 (age 69) Dublin, Ireland
- Party: Labour
- Education: Somerville College, Oxford; Bangor University
- Website: niagriffith.org.uk

Dame Nia Rhiannon Griffith (born 4 December 1956) is a Welsh politician who has been the Member of Parliament (MP) for Llanelli since 2005. A member of the Labour Party, she served as Parliamentary Under-Secretary of State for Wales and Equalities between 2024 and 2025.

== Early life and career ==
Griffith was born in Dublin, Republic of Ireland, on 4 December 1956.

She was educated at Newland High School for Girls (now called Newland School for Girls) in Hull and Somerville College, Oxford where she graduated with a first class degree in modern languages in 1979.

Griffith was a founder member of a local Women's Aid organisation and is a member of the National Union of Teachers and the Union of Shop, Distributive and Allied Workers.

== Parliamentary career ==
She was selected to contest the Welsh seat of Llanelli for Labour at the 2005 general election following the imposition of an all-women shortlist after the retirement of Denzil Davies. She won the seat with a majority of 7,234 votes and remains the MP there. Griffith made her maiden speech on 19 May 2005.

Griffith was re-elected in 2010 with her majority reduced by 2,533 votes. In October 2010, she became Shadow Minister for Business, Innovation and Skills until October 2011 when she became Shadow Minister for Wales. On 13 September 2015 she became Shadow Secretary of State for Wales. She resigned from this position on 27 June 2016 following a series of other resignations from Jeremy Corbyn's Shadow Cabinet, but was appointed Shadow Defence Secretary four months later. She supported Owen Smith in the failed attempt to replace Jeremy Corbyn in the 2016 Labour leadership election.

Griffith held her seat at the 2019 general election. She was appointed by Keir Starmer to serve as Shadow Secretary of State for Wales on 6 April 2020. On 29 November 2021 she was replaced by Jo Stevens in a shadow cabinet reshuffle. She announced her new role of Shadow Minister of State for International Trade on 4 December 2021.

She was appointed Dame Commander of the Order of the British Empire (DBE) in the 2022 Birthday Honours for political and public service.

In the 2023 British shadow cabinet reshuffle, she was appointed Shadow Minister in the Cabinet Office.

Griffith held her seat at the 2024 general election with 12,751 votes (31.3%); this was a decreased majority of 1,405 compared to the 2019 election. On 9 July 2024, she was appointed a Parliamentary under-secretary of state at the Wales Office. She left government at the 2025 British cabinet reshuffle.

== Expenses ==
In June 2009, Griffith was named as one of the Welsh MPs whose expenses had been overpaid. Following a review of expenses Sir Thomas Legg ordered Griffith to repay £4,099.77 in mortgage interest claims.

In June 2010, Griffith had to repay the cost of sending 71 letters having been found to have breached Parliamentary rules on using House of Commons stationery for political purposes. The Department of Resources ruled that the letters, sent out just before the general election, "sought to communicate information about the Labour Party and that its intention was to persuade constituents to vote accordingly for the sitting party member". Griffith also apologised for her actions.

== Personal life ==
Griffith is divorced, her former husband was a social worker. In a photo shoot for The Independent in February 2016, Griffith came out as a lesbian, commenting that her sexuality had been known among friends, family and colleagues since the mid-1990s. She was named on the 2017 Pink List of leading Welsh LGBT figures.

Griffith owns a house in Llanelli, a flat in London, and a smallholding in Carmarthenshire which received Tir Gofal funding. Her hobbies include music, European cinema, gardening, walking and cycling. She is an honorary associate of the National Secular Society.

== Publication ==
- 100 Ideas for Teaching Languages by Nia Griffith, 2005, Continuum International Publishing Group ISBN 0-8264-8549-9

Parliament of the United Kingdom
Preceded by Denzil Davies	Member of Parliament for Llanelli; 2005–present	Incumbent
Political offices
Preceded by Owen Smith	Shadow Secretary of State for Wales; 2015–2016	Succeeded by Paul Flynn
Preceded by Clive Lewis	Shadow Secretary of State for Defence; 2016–2020	Succeeded by John Healey
Preceded by Christina Rees	Shadow Secretary of State for Wales; 2020–2021	Succeeded by Jo Stevens
