= Gwydyr House =

Headquarters of the Wales Office, London

Coordinates: 51.5042°N 0.1258°W

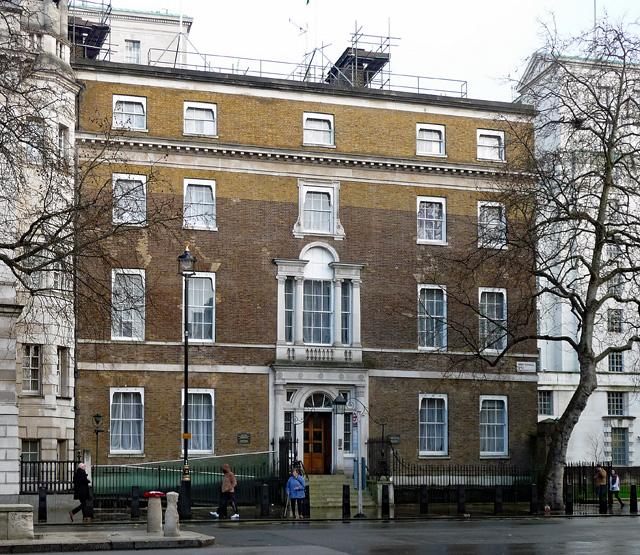
Gwydyr House

Gwydyr House (Welsh: Tŷ Gwydyr) is a Grade II* listed mansion in Whitehall, and is the London headquarters of the Wales Office. The house lies on the eastern side of the street, opposite Dover House.

== History ==
Gwydyr House was built for Peter Burrell of Beckenham, Kent, in 1772 at an estimated cost of £6,000. The house is named after his son, also called Peter Burrell, who was created 1st Baron Gwydyr in 1769. It remained privately owned until 1835 when the house became unoccupied. Between 1838 and 1840 the premises served as temporary accommodation for the Reform Club. Since 1871 Gwydyr House has been used for official purposes.

== Government use ==
Amongst the earliest official occupants of Gwydyr House were the Fine Arts Commission, the Commission of Revenue Inquiry and the Commission of Slave Compensation. The Secretary of State for Wales, Peter Hain, unveiled a plaque in Gwydyr House in March 2007 to mark the bicentenary of the Slave Trade Act 1807.

Later in the 19th century, Gwydyr House was occupied by the Board of Health, the Poor Law Board and the Charity Commission. Since 1971, the premises have been occupied by the Welsh Office and later the Wales Office (also known for a period as the Office of the Secretary of State for Wales). The building also houses the office of His Majesty's Lord-Lieutenant of Greater London Kenneth Olisa and the Greater London Lieutenancy.

== Cultural references ==
=== On television ===
Gwydyr House is the location of the fictional Department for Administrative Affairs in the BBC sitcom Yes Minister. In the pilot episode "Open Government", protagonist and Minister for Administrative Affairs, Jim Hacker MP, can be clearly seen entering the oak doors opposite Dover House on Whitehall. The minister's office features a large Palladian window which offers a view of the chimneys of a Georgian home. This window is a copy of the Palladian window over the door of Gwydyr House and offers a comparable view of the chimneys of the listed Georgian mansion Dover House opposite.
