= Cardiff Central (UK Parliament constituency) =

UK Parliament constituency (1983–2024)

Coordinates: 51.504°N 3.159°W

- Former borough constituency for the House of Commons
- Boundary of Cardiff Central in Wales
- Preserved county: South Glamorgan
- Population: 88,097 (2011 census)
- Electorate: 64,225 (December 2010)

1983–2024
- Seats: One
- Created from: Cardiff North and Cardiff South East
- Replaced by: Cardiff East, Cardiff South and Penarth
- Senedd: Cardiff Central, South Wales Central

Cardiff Central (Welsh: Canol Caerdydd) was a borough constituency (Note: A borough constituency (for the purposes of election expenses and type of returning officer)) in the city of Cardiff. It returned one Member of Parliament (MP) to the House of Commons of the Parliament of the United Kingdom, elected by the first past the post system. The seat was last held by Jo Stevens of the Labour Party. She was appointed as Shadow Secretary of State for Digital, Culture, Media and Sport on 6 April 2020.

The constituency was abolished as part of the 2023 Periodic Review of Westminster constituencies and under the June 2023 final recommendations of the Boundary Commission for Wales. The constituency's wards were split between Cardiff East and Cardiff South and Penarth.

== Boundaries ==
Map of boundaries 2010-2024

1983–2010: The City of Cardiff wards of Adamsdown, Cathays, Cyncoed, Pentwyn, Plasnewydd, and Roath.

2010–2024: The Cardiff electoral divisions of Adamsdown, Cathays, Cyncoed, Pentwyn, Penylan, and Plasnewydd.

As its name suggests, Cardiff Central covered the central area of the City of Cardiff. It extended from the area around the Millennium Stadium in the south to Llanishen Golf Course in the north, taking in the City Centre and the University.

== History ==
This was a Conservative-held three-way marginal constituency throughout the 1980s but since 1997 Labour and the Liberal Democrats have pushed the Conservative candidate into third place. The Liberal Democrats won the equivalent Welsh Assembly seat in 1999 and 2003 and also dominate the wards which make up the seat in elections to Cardiff Council.

The later constituency was socially diverse, with both very affluent and very deprived areas. It has a large student population which seems to have helped Labour to win in 1992 and 1997 but thereafter increasingly switched to the Liberal Democrats due to opposition to government plans for reforming student support. This switched yet again in the 2015 general election where students were disillusioned by the broken promises the Liberal Democrats made regarding tuition fees. This was despite the fact that these student loan promises did not apply to Wales, which has a different funding system and MP Jenny Willott had also voted against the English changes in Parliament.

The seat was unchanged in the Fifth Periodical Report of the Parliamentary Boundary Commission for Wales, which took effect at the 2010 general election.

Since the seat's re-creation in 1983, it was held successively by each of the three main political parties; the Liberal Democrats gained it at the 2005 election after 13 years of Labour representation. The constituency has transformed dramatically from being a Conservative seat for some years, to a Labour–Lib Dem marginal to the safest Labour seat in Wales at the time.

== Members of Parliament ==
=== MPs since 1983 ===
Election	Member	Party
1983	Ian Grist	Conservative
1992	Jon Owen Jones	Labour Co-operative
2005	Jenny Willott	Liberal Democrat
2015	Jo Stevens	Labour
2024	Constituency abolished	

== Elections ==
=== Elections 1983 to current ===
==== Elections in the 1980s ====
General election 1983: Cardiff Central
Party	Candidate	Votes	%	±%
Conservative	Ian Grist	16,090	41.4	N/A
Liberal	Mike German	12,638	32.6	N/A
Labour	Raymond Davies	9,387	24.2	N/A
Plaid Cymru	Andrew Morgan	704	1.8	N/A
Majority		3,452	8.8	N/A
Turnout		38,819	72.1	N/A
Registered electors		53,815		
Conservative win (new seat)				

General election 1987: Cardiff Central
Party	Candidate	Votes	%	±%
Conservative	Ian Grist	15,241	37.1	−4.3
Labour	Jon Owen Jones	13,255	32.3	+8.1
Liberal	Mike German	12,062	29.3	−3.3
Plaid Cymru	Siân Mair Caiach	535	1.3	−0.5
Majority		1,986	4.8	−4.0
Turnout		41,093	77.6	+5.5
Registered electors		52,980		
Conservative hold		Swing	−6.2	

==== Elections in the 1990s ====
General election 1992: Cardiff Central
Party	Candidate	Votes	%	±%
Labour Co-op	Jon Owen Jones	18,014	42.0	+9.7
Conservative	Ian Grist	14,549	33.9	−3.2
Liberal Democrats	Jenny Randerson	9,170	21.4	−7.9
Plaid Cymru	Huw Marshall	748	1.7	+0.4
Green	Christopher Von Ruhland	330	0.8	N/A
Natural Law	Brian Francis	105	0.2	N/A
Majority		3,465	8.1	N/A
Turnout		42,916	74.3	−3.3
Registered electors		57,716		
Labour Co-op gain from Conservative		Swing	+6.5	

General election 1997: Cardiff Central
Party	Candidate	Votes	%	±%
Labour Co-op	Jon Owen Jones	18,464	43.7	+1.7
Liberal Democrats	Jenny Randerson	10,541	24.9	+3.5
Conservative	David Melding	8,470	20.0	−13.9
Socialist Labour	Terence Burns	2,230	5.3	N/A
Plaid Cymru	Wayne Vernon	1,504	3.6	+1.9
Referendum	Nick Lloyd	760	1.8	N/A
Monster Raving Loony	Craig James	204	0.5	N/A
Natural Law	Anthony Hobbs	80	0.2	±0.0
Majority		7,923	18.8	+10.7
Turnout		42,253	70.0	−4.3
Registered electors		60,393		
Labour Co-op hold		Swing	+7.8	

==== Elections in the 2000s ====
General election 2001: Cardiff Central
Party	Candidate	Votes	%	±%
Labour Co-op	Jon Owen Jones	13,451	38.6	−5.1
Liberal Democrats	Jenny Willott	12,792	36.7	+11.8
Conservative	Gregory Walker	5,537	15.9	−4.1
Plaid Cymru	Richard Rhys Grigg	1,680	4.8	+1.2
Green	Stephen Bartley	661	1.9	N/A
Socialist Alliance	Julian Goss	283	0.8	N/A
UKIP	Frank Hughes	221	0.6	N/A
ProLife Alliance	Madeleine Jeremy	217	0.6	N/A
Majority		659	1.9	−16.9
Turnout		34,842	58.3	−11.7
Registered electors		59,785		
Labour Co-op hold		Swing	-8.5	

General election 2005: Cardiff Central
Party	Candidate	Votes	%	±%
Liberal Democrats	Jenny Willott	17,991	49.8	+13.1
Labour Co-op	Jon Owen Jones	12,398	34.3	−4.3
Conservative	Gotz Mohindra	3,339	9.2	−6.7
Plaid Cymru	Richard Rhys Grigg	1,271	3.5	−1.3
Respect	Raja Gul-Raiz	386	1.1	N/A
UKIP	Frank Hughes	383	1.1	+0.5
Independent	Anne Savoury	168	0.5	N/A
New Millennium Bean Party	Captain Beany	159	0.4	N/A
Rainbow Dream Ticket	Catherine Taylor-Dawson	37	0.1	N/A
Majority		5,593	15.5	N/A
Turnout		36,132	59.2	+0.9
Registered electors		61,079		
Liberal Democrats gain from Labour Co-op		Swing	+8.7	

==== Elections in the 2010s ====
General election 2010: Cardiff Central
Party	Candidate	Votes	%	±%
Liberal Democrats	Jenny Willott	14,976	41.4	−8.4
Labour	Jenny Rathbone	10,400	28.8	−5.5
Conservative	Karen Robson	7,799	21.6	+12.4
Plaid Cymru	Chris Williams	1,246	3.4	−0.1
UKIP	Sue Davies	765	2.1	+1.0
Green	Sam Coates	575	1.6	N/A
TUSC	Ross Saunders	162	0.4	N/A
Monster Raving Loony	Mark Beech	142	0.4	N/A
Independent	Alun Mathias	86	0.2	N/A
Majority		4,576	12.6	−2.9
Turnout		36,151	59.1	−0.1
Registered electors		61,165		
Liberal Democrats hold		Swing	−1.4	

General election 2015: Cardiff Central
Party	Candidate	Votes	%	±%
Labour	Jo Stevens	15,462	40.0	+11.2
Liberal Democrats	Jenny Willott	10,481	27.1	−14.3
Conservative	Richard Hopkin	5,674	14.7	−6.9
UKIP	Anthony Raybould	2,499	6.5	+4.4
Green	Chris Von Ruhland	2,461	6.4	+4.8
Plaid Cymru	Martin Pollard	1,925	5.0	+1.6
TUSC	Steve Williams	110	0.3	−0.1
Independent	Kazimir Hubert	34	0.1	N/A
Rejected ballots		117		
Majority		4,981	12.9	N/A
Turnout		38,646	67.3	+8.2
Registered electors		57,456		
Labour gain from Liberal Democrats		Swing	+12.8	

Of the 117 rejected ballots:

- 81 were either unmarked or it was uncertain who the vote was for.
- 32 voted for more than one candidate.
- 4 had writing or a mark by which the voter could be identified.

General election 2017: Cardiff Central
Party	Candidate	Votes	%	±%
Labour	Jo Stevens	25,193	62.4	+22.4
Conservative	Gregory Stafford	7,997	19.8	+5.1
Liberal Democrats	Eluned Parrott	5,415	13.4	−13.7
Plaid Cymru	Mark Hooper	999	2.5	−2.5
Green	Benjamin Smith	420	1.0	−5.4
UKIP	Mohammed Sarul-Islam	343	0.8	−5.7
Rejected ballots		80		
Majority		17,196	42.6	+29.7
Turnout		40,367	68.1	+0.8
Registered electors		59,288		
Labour hold		Swing	+8.6	

Of the 80 rejected ballots:

- 59 were either unmarked or it was uncertain who the vote was for.
- 19 voted for more than one candidate.
- 2 had writing or a mark by which the voter could be identified.

General election 2019: Cardiff Central
Party	Candidate	Votes	%	±%
Labour	Jo Stevens	25,605	61.2	−1.2
Conservative	Meirion Jenkins	8,426	20.1	+0.3
Liberal Democrats	Bablin Molik	6,298	15.1	+1.7
Brexit Party	Gareth Pearce	1,006	2.4	N/A
Gwlad Gwlad	Siân Caiach	280	0.7	N/A
Independent	Akil Kata	119	0.3	N/A
Socialist (GB)	Brian Johnson	88	0.2	N/A
Rejected ballots		204		
Majority		17,179	41.1	−1.5
Turnout		41,822	65.3	−2.8
Registered electors		64,037		
Labour hold		Swing	-0.8	

Of the 204 rejected ballots:

- 166 were either unmarked or it was uncertain who the vote was for.
- 38 voted for more than one candidate.

== See also ==
- Cardiff Central (Senedd constituency)
- List of parliamentary constituencies in South Glamorgan
- List of parliamentary constituencies in Wales
