= Cardiff North (UK Parliament constituency) =

UK Parliament constituency (1950–)

Coordinates: 51.517°N 3.203°W

- Borough constituency for the House of Commons
- Interactive map of boundaries from 2024
- Location of the constituency within Wales
- Preserved county: South Glamorgan
- Population: 88,114 (2011 census)
- Electorate: 71,143 (March 2020)

Current constituency
- Created: 1950
- Member of Parliament: Anna McMorrin (Labour)
- Seats: One
- Created from: Cardiff Central

Overlaps
- Senedd: Caerdydd Ffynnon Taf

Cardiff North (Welsh: Gogledd Caerdydd) is a constituency (Note: A borough constituency (for the purposes of election expenses and type of returning officer)) represented in the House of Commons of the UK Parliament since 2017 by Anna McMorrin of the Labour Party. (Note: As with all constituencies, the constituency elects one Member of Parliament (MP) by the first past the post system of election at least every five years.)

The constituency retained its name and gained one ward, as part of the 2023 review of Westminster constituencies and under the June 2023 final recommendations of the Boundary Commission for Wales for the 2024 United Kingdom general election.

== Boundaries ==
1950–1974: The County Borough of Cardiff wards of Cathays, Central, Gabalfa, Penylan and Plasnewydd.

1974–1983: The County Borough of Cardiff wards of Cathays, Central, Penylan, and Plasnewydd.

1983–2010: The City of Cardiff wards of Gabalfa, Heath, Lisvane and St Mellons, Llandaff North, Llanishen, Rhiwbina, and Whitchurch and Tongwynlais.

2010–2024: The Cardiff electoral divisions of Gabalfa, Heath, Lisvane^{1}, Llandaff North, Llanishen, Pontprennau and Old St Mellons, Rhiwbina, and Whitchurch and Tongwynlais.

2024–present: As above with the addition of the Rhondda Cynon Taf ward of Taff's Well, transferred from Pontypridd.

^{1} renamed Lisvane and Thornhill with effect from May 2022.

Cardiff City Centre was in this constituency from its creation in 1950 until 1983.

== History ==
This seat is the residential quarter of Wales's capital, over half of northern Cardiff consists of owner-occupied housing, with a higher number of a middle class population than other sections. Historically it mainly elected Conservative MPs.

In recent years Labour has overturned the nominal majority more recently, turning the seat into a national target swing-constituency. The seat was relative to others a marginal seat from 2001 to 2017 as well as a swing seat as its winner's majority did not exceed 8% and it changed political allegiance twice during that period. By 2004, the Conservatives held a majority of councillors within the constituency (13, against 5 Liberal Democrats, 3 independents and 0 Labour), but in the following 2005 general election Welsh Labour's Julie Morgan retained the seat but with a reduced majority.

Morgan stood again for Labour in 2010, whilst the Conservatives chose Jonathan Evans MEP, who had previously been the MP for Brecon and Radnor. Evans won by 194 votes.

In 2015, Labour attempted to take the seat back but new candidate, Craig Williams, took it with a majority of 2,137.

Labour retook the seat in 2017 on a 6.1% swing, producing a majority of 4,174; this was the first time in the seat's history it had voted for a Labour candidate in an election they did not win and the first time it elected an MP who is not a member of the largest party in the House of Commons since October 1974. In 2019, the seat bucked the trend by swinging to Labour despite their heavy defeat nationally, and a further swing in 2024 after their victory in the General Election led to a majority of over 11,000, the largest any party has had in the constituency's history.

== Members of Parliament ==
Election	Member	Party
1950	David Llewellyn	Conservative
1959	Donald Box	Conservative
1966	Ted Rowlands	Labour
1970	Michael Roberts	Conservative
Feb 1974	Ian Grist	Conservative
1983	Gwilym Jones	Conservative
1997	Julie Morgan	Labour
2010	Jonathan Evans	Conservative
2015	Craig Williams	Conservative
2017	Anna McMorrin	Labour

== Elections ==
=== Elections in the 1950s ===
General election 1950: Cardiff North
Party	Candidate	Votes	%	±%
Conservative	David Llewellyn	23,988	46.9	
Labour	William Howlett	21,081	41.3	
Liberal	Douglas Arthur Jones	6,017	11.8	
Majority		2,907	5.6	
Turnout		51,086	84.4	
Registered electors		60,543		
Conservative win (new seat)				

General election 1951: Cardiff North
Party	Candidate	Votes	%	±%
Conservative	David Llewellyn	29,408	56.6	+9.7
Labour Co-op	John Evans	22,600	43.4	+2.1
Majority		6,808	13.2	+7.6
Turnout		52,008	85.6	+1.2
Registered electors		60,767		
Conservative hold		Swing		

General election 1955: Cardiff North
Party	Candidate	Votes	%	±%
Conservative	David Llewellyn	29,409	59.3	+2.7
Labour	Leo Abse	20,224	40.7	–2.7
Majority		9,185	18.6	+5.4
Turnout		49,633	80.9	–4.7
Registered electors		61,352		
Conservative hold		Swing		

General election 1959: Cardiff North
Party	Candidate	Votes	%	±%
Conservative	Donald Box	28,737	57.8	–1.5
Labour	George S. Viner	18,054	36.3	–4.4
Plaid Cymru	Emrys Roberts	2,553	5.1	N/A
Independent	Stanley G. Worth	408	0.8	N/A
Majority		10,683	21.5	+3.0
Turnout		49,752	82.9	+2.0
Registered electors		59,986		
Conservative hold		Swing		

=== Elections in the 1960s ===
General election 1964: Cardiff North
Party	Candidate	Votes	%	±%
Conservative	Donald Box	21,837	44.6	–13.2
Labour	John A. Reynolds	18,215	37.2	+0.9
Liberal	Denis G. Rees	7,806	16.0	N/A
Plaid Cymru	Emrys Roberts	1,058	2.2	–2.9
Majority		3,622	7.4	–14.1
Turnout		48,916	80.7	–2.2
Registered electors		60,632		
Conservative hold		Swing		

General election 1966: Cardiff North
Party	Candidate	Votes	%	±%
Labour	Ted Rowlands	23,669	50.7	+13.5
Conservative	Donald Box	22,997	49.3	+4.7
Majority		672	1.4	N/A
Turnout		46,666	79.0	–1.7
Registered electors		59,092		
Labour gain from Conservative		Swing		

=== Elections in the 1970s ===
General election 1970: Cardiff North
Party	Candidate	Votes	%	±%
Conservative	Michael Roberts	21,983	46.9	–2.4
Labour	Ted Rowlands	20,207	43.2	–7.5
Liberal	Howard M. O'Brien	2,701	5.8	N/A
Plaid Cymru	Brian Morgan Edwards	1,927	4.1	N/A
Majority		1,776	3.7	N/A
Turnout		46,818	76.6	–2.4
Registered electors		61,057		
Conservative gain from Labour		Swing		

General election February 1974: Cardiff North
Party	Candidate	Votes	%	±%
Conservative	Ian Grist	14,659	42.9	–4.0
Labour	J. Collins	10,806	31.6	–11.6
Liberal	T A D Thomas	7,139	20.9	+15.1
Plaid Cymru	P Richards	1,586	4.6	+0.5
Majority		3,853	11.3	+7.6
Turnout		34,190	78.6	+2.0
Registered electors		43,511		
Conservative hold		Swing		

General election October 1974: Cardiff North
Party	Candidate	Votes	%	±%
Conservative	Ian Grist	13,480	41.9	–1.0
Labour	J Collins	11,479	35.7	+4.1
Liberal	Mike German	5,728	17.8	–3.1
Plaid Cymru	P. Richards	1,464	4.6	±0.0
Majority		2,001	6.2	–5.1
Turnout		32,151	73.3	–5.3
Registered electors		43,858		
Conservative hold		Swing		

General election 1979: Cardiff North
Party	Candidate	Votes	%	±%
Conservative	Ian Grist	17,181	47.3	+5.4
Labour	M D Petrou	13,133	36.2	+0.5
Liberal	Mike German	4,921	13.5	–4.3
Plaid Cymru	Owen John Thomas	1,081	3.0	–1.6
Majority		4,048	11.1	+4.9
Turnout		36,316	75.7	+2.4
Registered electors		47,973		
Conservative hold		Swing		

=== Elections in the 1980s ===
General election 1983: Cardiff North
Party	Candidate	Votes	%	±%
Conservative	Gwilym Jones	19,433	47.1	–0.2
SDP	Anthony Jeremy	12,585	30.5	+17.0
Labour	Jane Hutt	8,256	20.0	–16.2
Plaid Cymru	Dafydd J. L. Huws	974	2.4	–0.6
Majority		6,848	16.6	+5.5
Turnout		41,248	77.3	+1.6
Registered electors		53,377		
Conservative hold		Swing		

General election 1987: Cardiff North
Party	Candidate	Votes	%	±%
Conservative	Gwilym Jones	20,061	45.3	–1.8
Labour	Stephen Tarbet	11,827	26.7	+6.7
SDP	Anthony Jeremy	11,725	26.5	–4.0
Plaid Cymru	Eluned Bush	692	1.5	–0.9
Majority		8,234	18.6	+2.0
Turnout		44,305	81.0	+3.7
Registered electors		54,704		
Conservative hold		Swing		

=== Elections in the 1990s ===
General election 1992: Cardiff North
Party	Candidate	Votes	%	±%
Conservative	Gwilym Jones	21,547	45.1	–0.2
Labour	Julie Morgan	18,578	38.9	+12.2
Liberal Democrats	Eve Warlow	6,487	13.6	–12.9
Plaid Cymru	Eluned Bush	916	1.9	+0.4
BNP	John Morse	121	0.3	N/A
Natural Law	David Palmer	86	0.2	N/A
Majority		2,969	6.2	–12.4
Turnout		47,735	84.1	+3.1
Registered electors		56,721		
Conservative hold		Swing	–6.2	

General election 1997: Cardiff North
Party	Candidate	Votes	%	±%
Labour	Julie Morgan	24,460	50.4	+11.5
Conservative	Gwilym Jones	16,334	33.7	–11.4
Liberal Democrats	Robyn Rowland	5,294	10.9	–2.7
Plaid Cymru	Colin Palfrey	1,201	2.5	+0.6
Referendum	Edward Litchfield	1,199	2.5	N/A
Majority		8,126	16.7	N/A
Turnout		48,488	80.2	–3.9
Registered electors		60,468		
Labour gain from Conservative		Swing	–11.5	

=== Elections in the 2000s ===
General election 2001: Cardiff North
Party	Candidate	Votes	%	±%
Labour	Julie Morgan	19,845	45.9	–4.5
Conservative	Alastair Watson	13,680	31.6	–2.1
Liberal Democrats	John Dixon	6,631	15.3	+4.4
Plaid Cymru	Sion Jobbins	2,471	5.7	+3.2
UKIP	Don Hulston	613	1.4	N/A
Majority		6,165	14.3	–2.4
Turnout		43,240	69.0	–11.2
Registered electors		62,634		
Labour hold		Swing		

General election 2005: Cardiff North
Party	Candidate	Votes	%	±%
Labour	Julie Morgan	17,707	39.0	–6.9
Conservative	Jonathan Morgan	16,561	36.5	+4.9
Liberal Democrats	John Dixon	8,483	18.7	+3.4
Plaid Cymru	John Rowlands	1,936	4.3	–1.4
UKIP	Don Hulston	534	1.2	–0.2
Forward Wales	Alison Hobbs	138	0.3	N/A
Rainbow Dream Ticket	Catherine Taylor-Dawson	1	0.0	N/A
Majority		1,146	2.5	–11.8
Turnout		45,360	70.5	+1.5
Registered electors		64,390		
Labour hold		Swing	–5.9	

=== Elections in the 2010s ===
General election 2010: Cardiff North
Party	Candidate	Votes	%	±%
Conservative	Jonathan Evans	17,860	37.5	+1.0
Labour	Julie Morgan	17,666	37.1	–1.9
Liberal Democrats	John Dixon	8,724	18.3	–0.4
Plaid Cymru	Llywelyn Rhys	1,588	3.3	–1.0
UKIP	Lawrence Gwynn	1,130	2.4	+1.2
Green	Christopher von Ruhland	362	0.8	N/A
Christian	Derek Thomson	300	0.6	N/A
Majority		194	0.4	N/A
Turnout		47,630	72.7	+2.2
Registered electors		65,553		
Conservative gain from Labour		Swing	+1.5	

General election 2015: Cardiff North
Party	Candidate	Votes	%	±%
Conservative	Craig Williams	21,709	42.4	+4.9
Labour	Mari Williams	19,572	38.3	+1.2
UKIP	Ethan Wilkinson	3,953	7.7	+5.3
Plaid Cymru	Elin Jones	2,301	4.5	+1.2
Liberal Democrats	Elizabeth Clark	1,953	3.8	–14.5
Green	Ruth Osner	1,254	2.5	+1.7
Christian	Jeff Green	331	0.6	±0.0
Alter Change	Shaun Jenkins	78	0.2	N/A
Rejected ballots		80		
Majority		2,137	4.1	+3.7
Turnout		51,151	76.1	+3.4
Registered electors		67,196		
Conservative hold		Swing	+1.8	

Of the 80 rejected ballots:

- 64 were either unmarked or it was uncertain who the vote was for.
- 14 voted for more than one candidate.
- 2 had writing or mark by which the voter could be identified.

General election 2017: Cardiff North
Party	Candidate	Votes	%	±%
Labour	Anna McMorrin	26,081	50.1	+11.8
Conservative	Craig Williams	21,907	42.1	–0.3
Plaid Cymru	Steffan Webb	1,738	3.3	–1.2
Liberal Democrats	Matt Hemsley	1,714	3.3	–0.5
UKIP	Gary Oldfield	582	1.1	–6.6
Rejected ballots		98		
Majority		4,174	8.0	N/A
Turnout		52,022	77.4	+1.3
Registered electors		67,220		
Labour gain from Conservative		Swing	+6.1	

Of the 98 rejected ballots:

- 77 were either unmarked or it was uncertain who the vote was for.
- 21 voted for more than one candidate.

General election 2019: Cardiff North
Party	Candidate	Votes	%	±%
Labour	Anna McMorrin	26,064	49.5	–0.6
Conservative	Mo Ali	19,082	36.2	–5.9
Liberal Democrats	Rhys Taylor	3,580	6.8	+3.5
Plaid Cymru	Steffan Webb	1,606	3.0	–0.3
Brexit Party	Chris Butler	1,311	2.5	N/A
Green	Michael Cope	820	1.6	N/A
Independent	Richard Jones	203	0.4	N/A
Rejected ballots		111		
Majority		6,982	13.3	+5.3
Turnout		52,666	76.9	―0.5
Registered electors		68,438		
Labour hold		Swing	+2.8	

Of the 111 rejected ballots:

- 86 were either unmarked or it was uncertain who the vote was for.
- 22 voted for more than one candidate.
- 3 had writing or mark by which the voter could be identified.

2019 notional result (Note: Estimate of the 2019 general election result as if the revised boundaries recommended under the 2023 boundary review were in place)
Party	Vote	%
Labour	27,130	49.6
Conservative	19,551	35.7
Liberal Democrats	3,582	6.5
Plaid Cymru	1,888	3.5
Brexit Party	1,450	2.7
Green Party	820	1.5
Independent (2)	288	0.5
Majority	7,579	13.9
Turnout	54,709	76.9
Electorate	71,143	

=== Elections in the 2020s ===
General election 2024: Cardiff North
Party	Candidate	Votes	%	±%
Labour	Anna McMorrin	20,849	43.9	–5.7
Conservative	Joel Williams	9,642	20.3	–15.4
Reform	Lawrence Gwynn	5,985	12.6	+9.9
Plaid Cymru	Malcolm Phillips	4,669	9.8	+6.3
Liberal Democrats	Irfan Latif	3,168	6.7	+0.2
Green	Meg Shepherd-Foster	3,160	6.7	+5.2
Majority		11,207	23.6	+9.7
Turnout		47,473	66.5	–10.4
Registered electors		71,335		
Labour hold		Swing	+4.9	

== See also ==
- Cardiff North (Senedd constituency)
- List of parliamentary constituencies in South Glamorgan
- List of parliamentary constituencies in Wales
