= Craig Williams (British politician) =

British politician (born 1985)

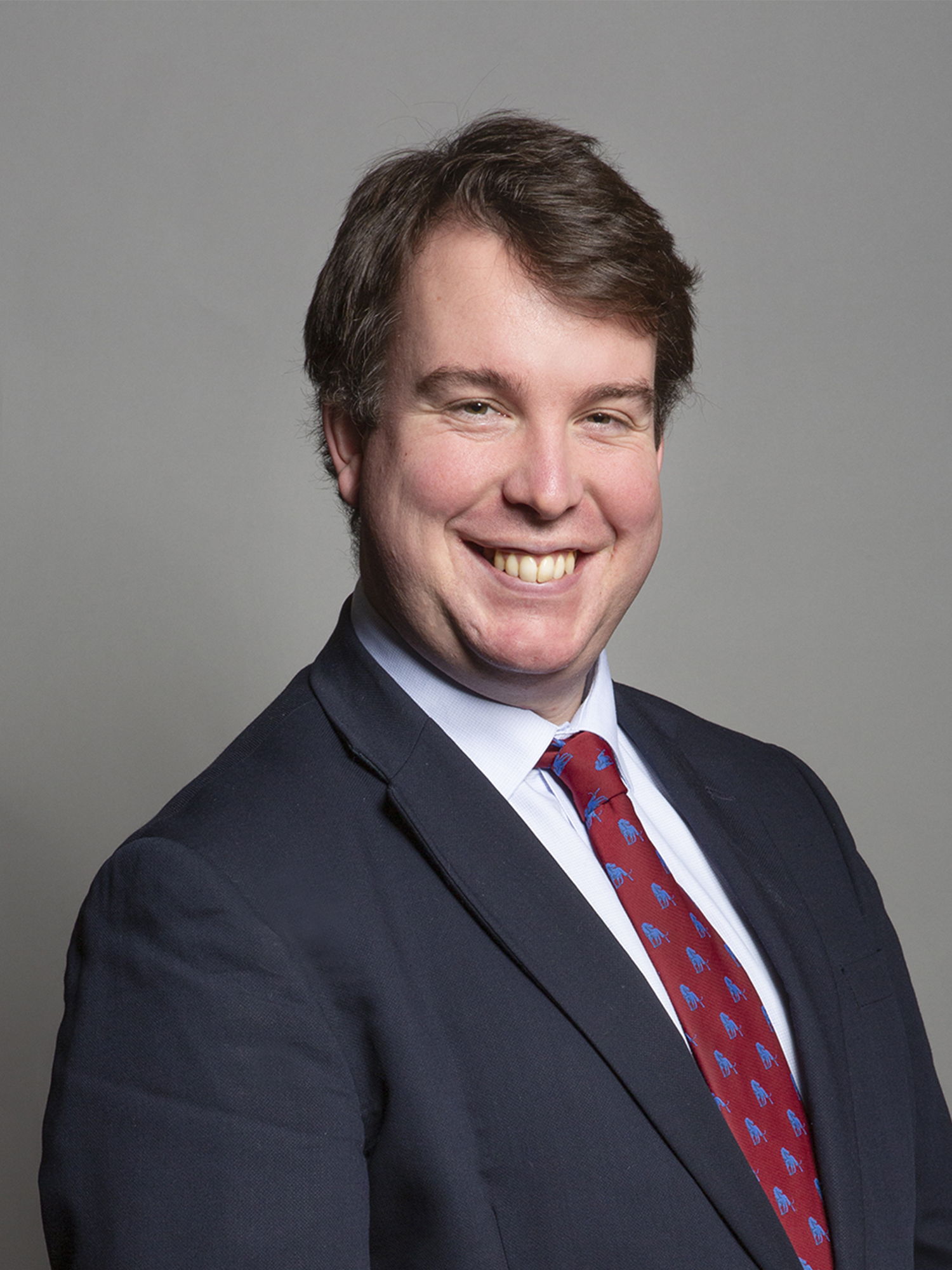
- Official portrait, 2019

Parliamentary Private Secretary to the Prime Minister
- In office 25 October 2022 – 25 June 2024
- Prime Minister: Rishi Sunak
- Preceded by: Suzanne Webb
- Succeeded by: Liz Twist; Chris Ward

Member of Parliament for Montgomeryshire
- In office 12 December 2019 – 30 May 2024
- Preceded by: Glyn Davies
- Succeeded by: Steve Witherden

Member of Parliament for Cardiff North
- In office 7 May 2015 – 3 May 2017
- Preceded by: Jonathan Evans
- Succeeded by: Anna McMorrin

Personal details
- Born: 7 June 1985 (age 41) Welshpool, Wales
- Party: Independent (since 2024); Conservative (until 2024)
- Spouse: Claire Williams
- Children: 2
- Website: craig-williams.org.uk

Alun Craig Williams (born 7 June 1985) is a Welsh politician who was Parliamentary Private Secretary to the Prime Minister from October 2022 until June 2024. A member of the Conservative Party, he was the Member of Parliament (MP) for Cardiff North from 2015 to 2017, when he was defeated for reelection by the Labour Party's Anna McMorrin. In 2019, Williams was elected as the MP for Montgomeryshire, but lost the seat in the 2024 general election.

Three days prior to the announcement of the date of the 2024 general election, Williams placed a £100 bet that it would be held in July. The bet was referred to the Gambling Commission to determine whether Williams had placed the bet based on confidential information, which could constitute a criminal offence. Williams' bet became part of a wider scandal involving other members of the Conservative Party. On 25 June 2024, the party announced it was withdrawing support for Williams's candidacy in the election, and that should he be elected he would not be granted the Conservative whip. In April 2025 Williams was formally charged by the Gambling Commission under section 42 of the Gambling Act.

== Early life and education ==
Williams was born in Welshpool, Powys, to David and Andrea Williams. He attended Gungrog Road school, Ysgol Maesydre and Welshpool High School. He went on to further education at Walford College and the University of Birmingham.

== Parliamentary career ==
Williams first stood for office in Cardiff West against the Welsh First Minister Rhodri Morgan in the 2007 National Assembly for Wales election. Williams had represented Pentyrch ward on City of Cardiff Council from 2008, and unsuccessfully contested the 2012 Cardiff South and Penarth by-election, coming second to Labour's Stephen Doughty. Whilst on the council, he was Chairman of the Economy Committee from 2012 to 2015. He was Director of Cardiff Bus from 2011 to 2015. In May 2015, he was elected Member of Parliament for the marginal seat of Cardiff North. In July 2015, Williams was elected as a member of the Work and Pensions Select Committee, a position which he held until October 2016. Williams then served as a member of the Welsh Affairs Select Committee and the Scottish Affairs Select Committee.

Williams was opposed to Brexit prior to the 2016 UK European Union membership referendum, and consistently voted with the Government Whip. He lost his seat at the June 2017 general election to Labour's Anna McMorrin. Prior to the 2019 UK general election, Williams was a Special Adviser to the Secretary of State for Exiting the European Union, Steve Barclay. In July 2019, Williams was announced as the Conservative candidate for the constituency of Montgomeryshire for the next general election, where the sitting Conservative MP Glyn Davies was standing down. In the general election held in December 2019, Williams won the seat with 59% of the vote, and consequently returned to Westminster. He increased the Conservative majority in Montgomeryshire to over 12,000 votes.

Williams was appointed Parliamentary Private Secretary to his former boss, Steve Barclay, the Chief Secretary to the Treasury. He also joined the International Trade Select Committee and European Statutory Instruments Committee. In addition, he chaired the All Party Parliamentary Groups on Wales in the World and International Trade and Investment. In November 2020 it was alleged that Williams was napping on the parliamentary benches, and a social media clip suggested that he was not paying attention, or even sleeping. Williams said this was due to a partial deafness in one ear, which he confirmed during a speech on the British Sign Language Bill. In 2022, Williams resigned from his position as Parliamentary Private Secretary, having lost confidence in the Prime Minister, Boris Johnson.

Williams was sworn in as a Privy Counsellor in November 2023, entitling him to the style The Right Honourable He was removed as a Privy Councillor on 8 July 2026 following his conviction.

On 12 June 2024, a governmental betting scandal, involving other members of the Conservative Party, began when it became known that Williams had placed a £100 bet on a July date for the 2024 general election, three days before a July date was announced. The bet was referred to the Gambling Commission to determine whether Williams had placed the bet based on confidential information, which could constitute a criminal offence. Williams apologised for the bet, but neither he nor Sunak would answer whether he had inside information. The Gambling Commission wrote to Sunak about Williams. Foreign Secretary David Cameron said that Williams's bet on the election was "very foolish". On 25 June 2024, the Conservative Party announced it would be withdrawing support for Williams and would no longer devote resources to his campaign and that should he be elected he would not be granted the Conservative whip. Due to ballots already being printed and sent out in early voting, Williams remained listed as the Conservative Party candidate for Montgomeryshire and Glyndŵr.

The result of the 2024 general election for the Montgomeryshire and Glyndŵr constituency was that Williams lost his seat, polling 7,775 votes, and so coming in third place behind Labour (12,709) and Reform UK (8,894).

== Post-Parliamentary career ==
On 14 April 2025, Williams was charged by the Gambling Commission with cheating under section 42 of the Gambling Act, following an investigation into alleged betting using confidential information about the timing of the 2024 general election. He was one of fifteen individuals accused of placing bets based on confidential knowledge of the election date prior to its public announcement. Williams appeared at Westminster Magistrates' Court on 13 June 2025, where he was granted unconditional bail.

The case was transferred to Southwark Crown Court, where Williams appeared on 11 July 2025 and did not enter a plea. Due to the number of defendants, the trial was split into two phases. On 29 June 2026, Williams pleaded guilty to cheating at gambling by placing bets on the date of the 2024 general election. Zoe Johnson KC, prosecuting, said three further cheating charges, which Williams had denied, would be dropped. He was dismissed from the Privy Council on 10 July 2026.

== Personal life ==
Williams married Clare Bath in 2013, with whom he has a son and a daughter. He is a member of the Carlton Club as well as the Cardiff and County Club. Williams is a school governor at a primary school.

Parliament of the United Kingdom
Preceded by Jonathan Evans	Member of Parliament for Cardiff North; 2015–2017	Succeeded by Anna McMorrin
Preceded by Glyn Davies	Member of Parliament for Montgomeryshire; 2019–2024	Constituency abolished
Political offices
Preceded by Suzanne Webb	Parliamentary Private Secretary to the Prime Minister; 2022–2024	Succeeded by Liz Twist
