= Jonathan Evans (politician) =

British politician (born 1950)

Jonathan Evans FRSA
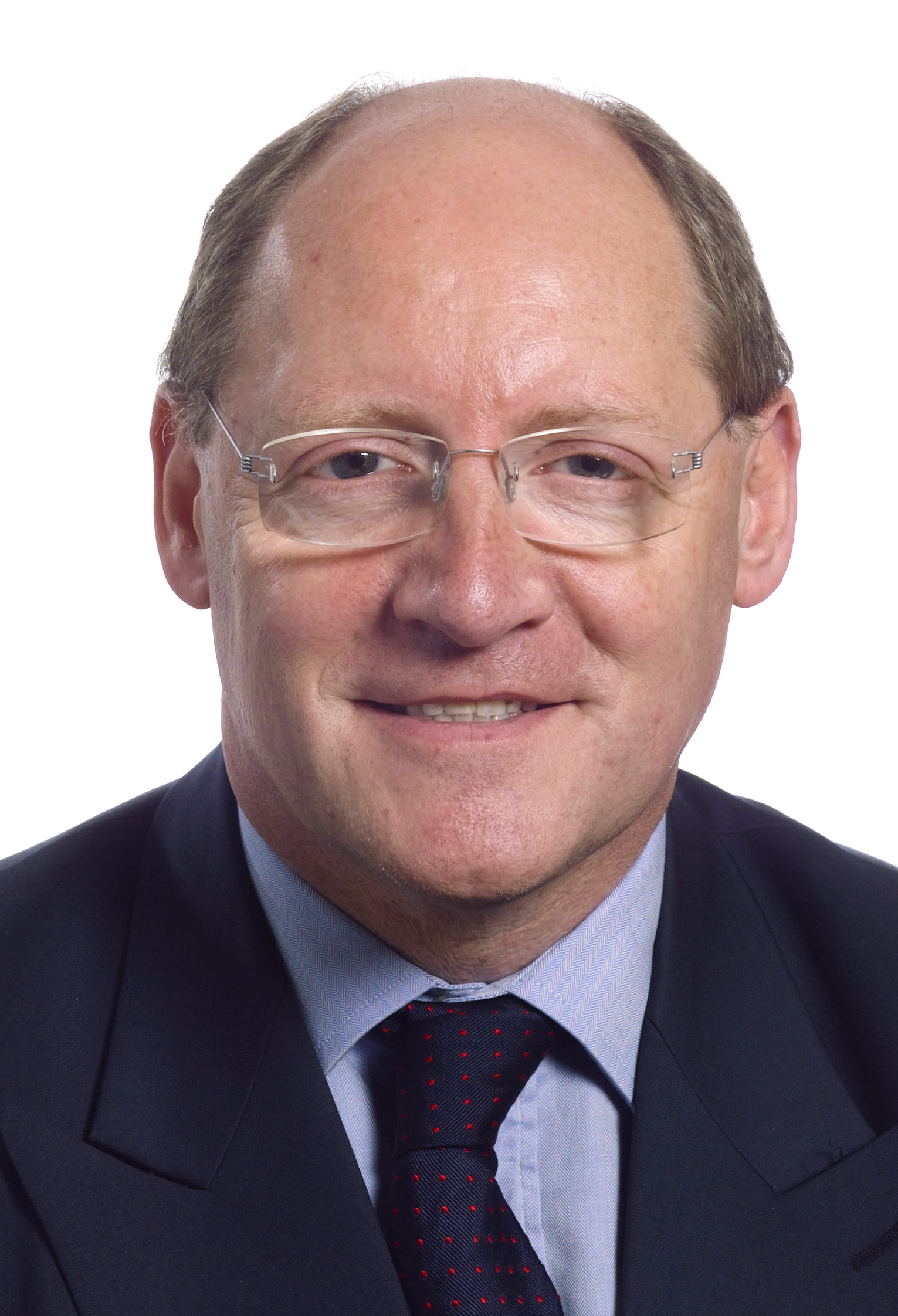

Parliamentary Under-Secretary of State for Wales
- In office 2 June 1996 – 1 May 1997
- Prime Minister: John Major
- Preceded by: Rod Richards
- Succeeded by: Peter Hain

Parliamentary Under-Secretary of State for Trade and Industry
- In office 25 October 1994 – 29 November 1995
- Prime Minister: John Major
- Preceded by: Neil Hamilton
- Succeeded by: John Taylor

Member of Parliament for Cardiff North
- In office 6 May 2010 – 30 March 2015
- Preceded by: Julie Morgan
- Succeeded by: Craig Williams

Member of European Parliament for Wales
- In office 10 June 1999 – 4 June 2009
- Preceded by: Position established
- Succeeded by: Kay Swinburne

Member of Parliament for Brecon and Radnorshire
- In office 9 April 1992 – 8 April 1997
- Preceded by: Richard Livsey
- Succeeded by: Richard Livsey

Personal details
- Born: 2 June 1950 (age 76) Tredegar, Monmouthshire, Wales
- Party: Conservative
- Spouse: Margaret
- Children: 3
- Profession: Solicitor
- Website: jonathanevans.org.uk

Jonathan Peter Evans FRSA (born 2 June 1950) is a Welsh lawyer, businessman and former politician. He has been Chairman of the British Insurance Brokers Association since 1 January 2020.

After training as a solicitor, he was the Conservative Member of Parliament for Brecon and Radnorshire between 1992 and 1997, and then Member of the European Parliament for Wales between 1999 and 2009. He was the Member of Parliament (MP) for Cardiff North from the 2010 general election until the dissolution of the 55th Parliament on 30 March 2015.

== Professional career ==
Born in Tredegar, Evans was educated at Lewis School, Pengam, Howardian High School, Cardiff and the Law Society's College of Law in Guildford and London. He trained with solicitors Leo Abse and Cohen in Cardiff from 1968 and joined the firm upon qualification in 1973 rising to Managing Partner in 1987. In 1997, he was appointed Director of Insurance in the City of London office of Eversheds, the major global law firm and remained a consultant to the practice until 2009. He has also acted as a consultant on London Insurance market issues to several major North American insurance corporations.

He is a former Deputy Chairman of the Welsh Housing Corporation (Tai Cymru). In 1995 he was appointed as a Fellow of the Royal Society of Arts. From 1999 to 2009 he served on the Boards of NFU Mutual and Country Mutual Insurance Brokers. Between 2005 and 2009 he was Chairman of Pearl Group Limited, and between 2009 and 2016 he was non-executive chairman of the Phoenix Life insurance companies.

In April 2015 after stepping down as MP for Cardiff North, he became non-executive chairman of Allied World Managing Agency, which manages Lloyd's Syndicate 2232. He also joined the board of directors of Allied World Assurance Company Holdings.

In September 2015 he became a Freeman of the City of London.

He was presented with the Lifetime Achievement Award at the British Insurance Awards 2016 at the Royal Albert Hall on 6 July 2016.

In May 2018, he joined the Board of the British Insurance Brokers Association, and became Chairman in January 2020.

== Political career ==
Evans first stood for Parliament at the age of 23. In February and October 1974 he was the Conservative Party candidate for the ultra-safe Labour seat of Ebbw Vale, losing to Michael Foot, later Leader of the Labour Party, on each occasion. In 1979 he fought Wolverhampton North East, securing one of the highest pro-Conservative swings in the UK but was beaten by Renee Short. He contested the 1987 general election in the marginal Brecon and Radnorshire constituency, but missed election by 56 votes to the sitting Liberal MP Richard Livsey. in the closest result of the 1987 election.

At the 1992 general election, he defeated Livsey (who was now a Liberal Democrat) by 130 votes in one of only three Conservative gains in the 1992 election and took his seat in the House of Commons. After two years in Parliament, he was appointed as a junior minister in the John Major government, serving as Parliamentary Secretary to the Lord Chancellor; Corporate Affairs Minister at the Department of Trade and Industry; and then serving under William Hague as Under Secretary of State for Wales from 1996 to 1997. However, at the 1997 general election the Liberal Democrats retook his seat. He consistently voted against same-sex marriage.

At the European Parliament election, 1999, Evans was elected as MEP for Wales, and he was re-elected at the 2004 Euro-elections. He was Leader of the Conservatives in the European Parliament from 2001 until 2004. From 2004 to 2009 he was President of the European Parliament Delegation for relations with the U.S. Congress and Co Chairman of the Transatlantic Legislators Dialogue. Following the decision of President Bush and Angela Merkel to set up the Transatlantic Economic Council, he became Chairman of the Council's Advisory Board. In August 2007, he was selected to fight the highly marginal seat of Cardiff North in the 2010 general election. Evans stood down from the European Parliament at the 2009 elections and was succeeded by Kay Swinburne, Evans subsequently won the Cardiff North seat with a majority of 194 votes. He became chairman of the All Party Parliamentary Group on Wholesale Financial Markets and Services and of the All-Party Parliamentary group on Insurance and Financial services. He was also Chairman of the All Party Group for Mutuals and sponsored the Mutuals (Deferred Shares) Act 2015 through the House of Commons. He was MP for Cardiff North from May 2010 until March 2015. Between 2006 and 2015 he was Chairman of the Association of Conservative Clubs. He was also Chairman of the Political Committee of the Carlton Club between 2013 and 2015. He was Chairman of the Welsh Conservative Party from 2014 to 2017.

== Personal life ==
Evans is married to Margaret, and has three children (Angharad, Rhianydd and Nicholas).

He is a supporter of Cardiff City Football Club and Cardiff Blues Rugby Club.

A Roman Catholic, he is a leading pro-life campaigner for the Society for the Protection of Unborn Children and launched their Welsh office in Cardiff in the 1990s. He has been a Vice President of the Catholic Union of Great Britain since 2001.

Parliament of the United Kingdom
Preceded by Richard Livsey	Member of Parliament for Brecon and Radnorshire; 1992–1997	Succeeded by Richard Livsey
Preceded by Julie Morgan	Member of Parliament for Cardiff North; 2010–2015	Succeeded by Craig Williams
European Parliament
New constituency	Member of European Parliament for Wales; 1999–2009	Succeeded by Kay Swinburne
