= Welsh Office =

Former British government ministry

Welsh Office Swyddfa Gymreig
- 1953 Royal Badge of Wales

Department overview
- Formed: 1965
- Dissolved: 1999
- Superseding Department: Wales Office
- Jurisdiction: Government of the United Kingdom
- Headquarters: Crown Buildings, Cathays Park
- Minister responsible: Secretary of State for Wales

Welsh Office buildings in Cardiff & London

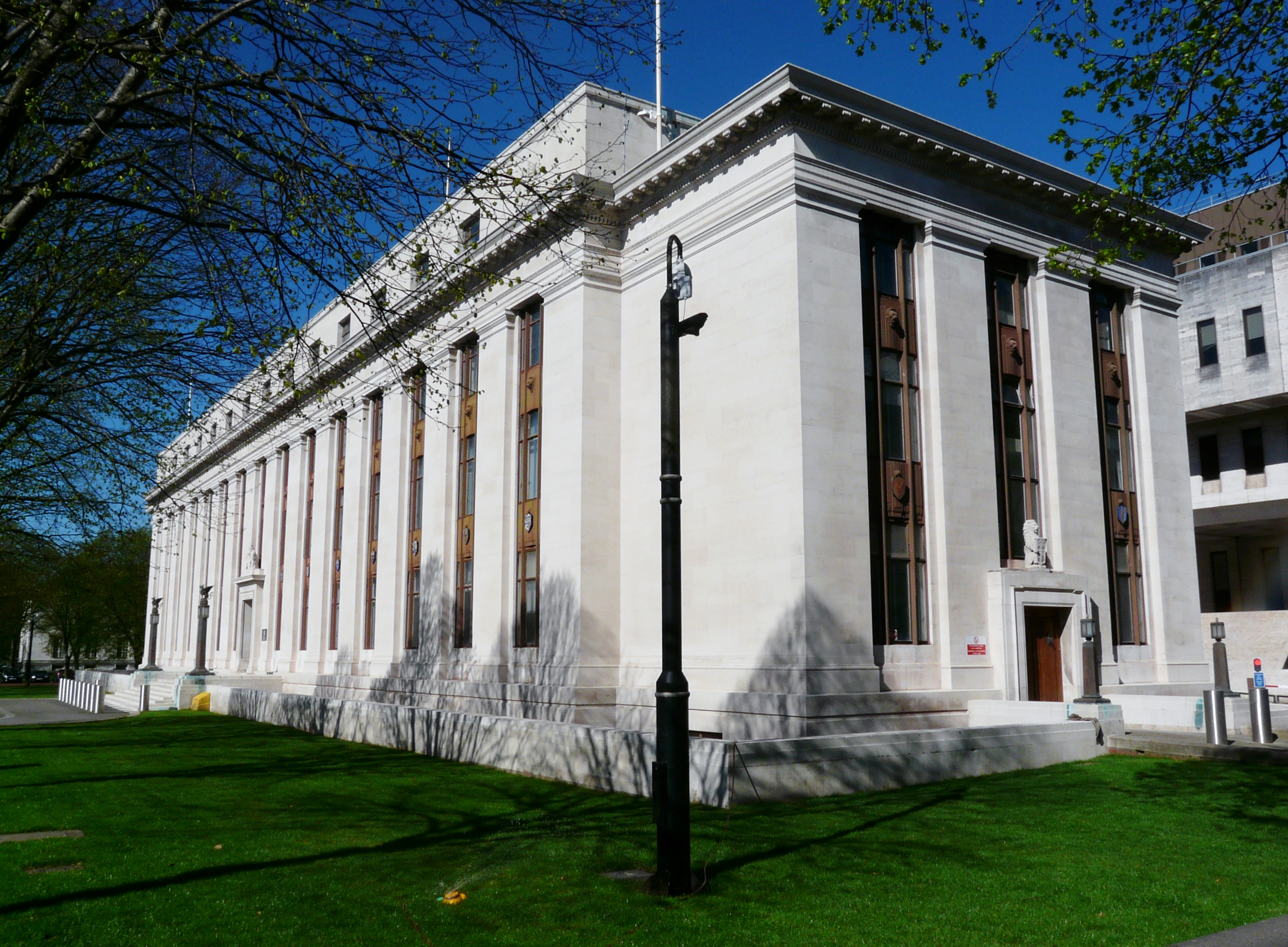
The old Crown Building, Cathays Park, Cardiff

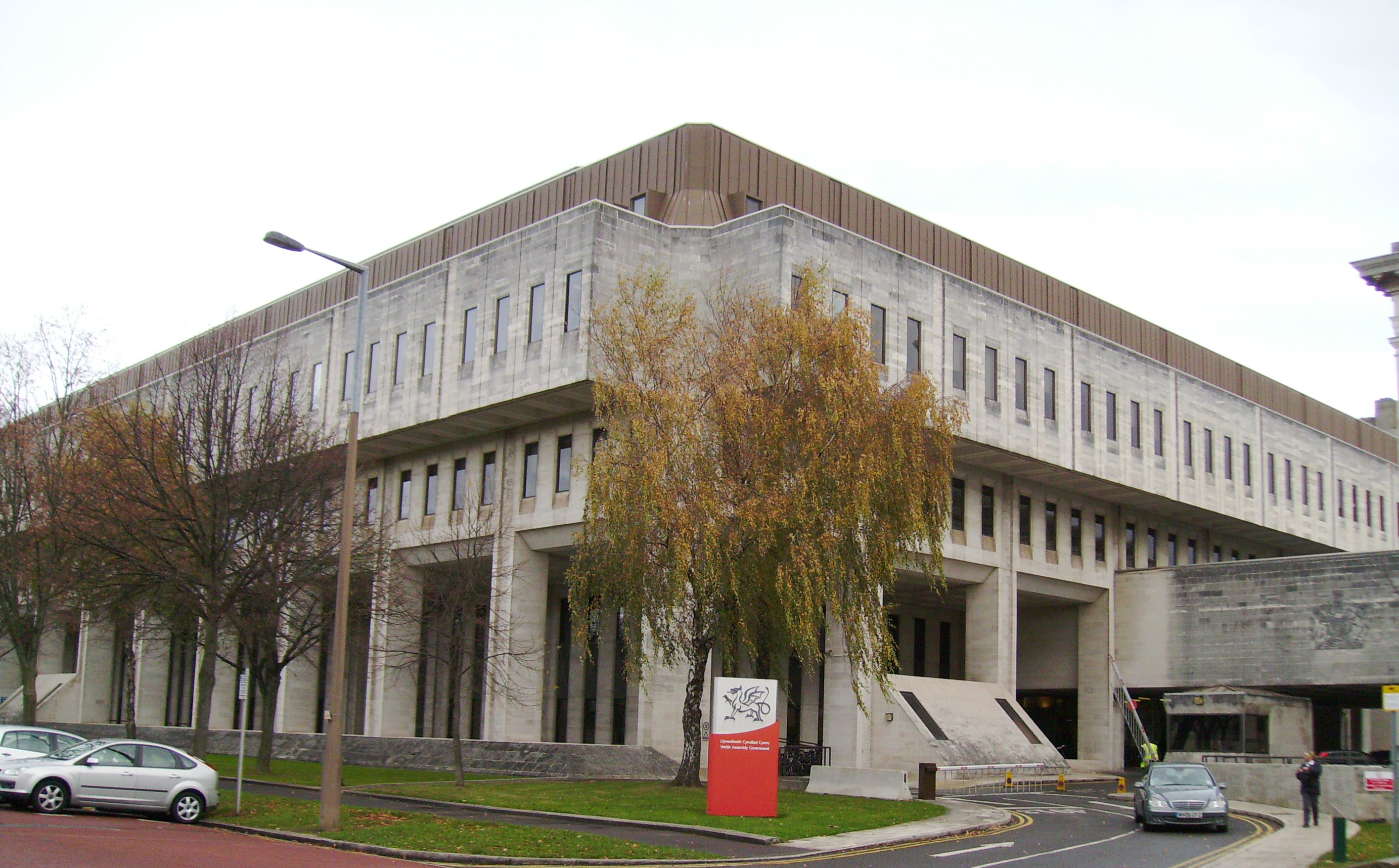
The new Crown Building, Cathays Park, Cardiff

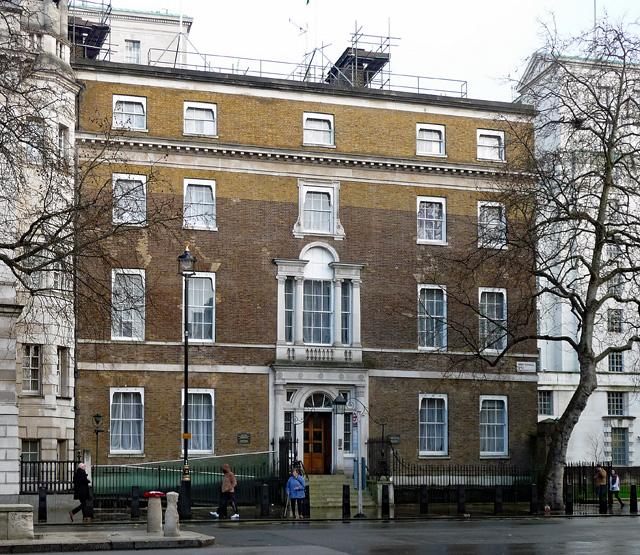
Gwydyr House, Whitehall, London

The Welsh Office (Welsh: Swyddfa Gymreig) was a department in the Government of the United Kingdom with responsibilities for Wales. It was established in April 1965 to execute government policy in Wales, and was headed by the Secretary of State for Wales, a post which had been created in October 1964. It was disbanded on 1 July 1999 when most of its powers were transferred to the National Assembly for Wales, with some powers transferred to the Office of the Secretary of State for Wales (Welsh: Swyddfa Ysgrifennydd Gwladol Cymru), today known as the Wales Office.

The Welsh Office took over the responsibilities related to housing, local government and town and country planning, etc. for Wales which had previously been the responsibilities of several other government departments. Its responsibilities included Monmouthshire, which for some purposes had earlier been considered by some to lie within England.

== Precursors ==
Wales had been incorporated into the English legal system through the Laws in Wales Acts 1535–1542. Legislation specific to Wales, such as the Sunday Closing (Wales) Act 1881 and the Welsh Intermediate Education Act 1889, began to be introduced in the late 19th century. Responsibility for Welsh education was given to the Welsh Department of the Board of Education in 1907, and the following year the Royal Commission on Ancient and Historical Monuments in Wales and Monmouthshire was established. The Welsh Board of Health was formed in 1919, and the Welsh Department of the Ministry of Agriculture and Fisheries in 1922. A Boundary Commission for Wales was set up under the House of Commons (Redistribution of Seats) Act 1944.

A Council for Wales and Monmouthshire was established in 1949 to monitor the effects of government policy. Government departments which had established Welsh offices or units by 1951 included the Ministry of Housing and Local Government, the Ministry of Transport, and the Forestry Commission, and 1951 the office of Minister for Welsh Affairs was created. This post was vested in the Home Secretary until 1957, when it was transferred to the Minister of Housing and Local Government, assisted by a Minister of State.

== Establishment and development ==
The post of Minister for Welsh Affairs was replaced in 1964 by the office of Secretary of State for Wales, which was given responsibility for the new Welsh Office in 1965. The Welsh Office was created to execute government policy in Wales. It took over, from other departments, functions relating to economic planning, housing, local government, sewerage, environmental health, town and country planning, Welsh national parks, historic buildings, and cultural activities. The Welsh Language Act 1967 formally dissolved the legislation which provided that references made in Parliament to England automatically included Wales, under the Wales and Berwick Act 1746.

By 1969, the role of the Welsh Office had expanded to also cover responsibilities for highway construction and maintenance, tourism, water, forestry, common land, the Historic Buildings Council for Wales, and the Countryside Commission in Wales. That year it was also given responsibility for health and welfare services, and for the use of the Welsh language in the registration of births, marriages and deaths. During the 1970s, changes in central government led to the delegation of additional functions. Most responsibilities for primary and secondary education in Wales, were transferred in 1970; and most of the child care responsibilities of the Home Office were passed to the Welsh Office in 1971. Responsibilities relating to the promotion of industry in Wales were passed to the Welsh Office in 1974–75; and in 1978 it assumed control of further education functions, and the training and supply of teachers for primary and secondary education. In 1978, it also gained sole responsibility for agriculture and fishery matters in Wales.

By 1998, the Welsh Office comprised the following departments:

- Agriculture
- Transport Planning and Environment Group
- Welsh Office Health Department
- Economic Development Group
- Establishments Group
- Finance Group
- Education Department
- Health Professionals Group
- Industry and Training Group
- Legal Group
- Local Government Group.

Most of these had headquarters in Cardiff, with offices in London to help co-ordinate policies with Whitehall departments, and to provide secretariat and support services for Ministers and the Permanent Secretary.

== Establishment of the National Assembly ==
Following the referendum on Welsh devolution in 1997, the Welsh Office was formally disbanded on 1 July 1999 and the majority of its powers were transferred to the National Assembly for Wales, now known as the Senedd. The cabinet position of Secretary of State for Wales was retained as the head of a newly formed Wales Office.

== Secretary of State for Wales ==
See List of secretaries of state for Wales

== Permanent secretary ==
- Sir Goronwy Daniel (1964–1969)
- Sir Idwal Pugh (1969–1971)
- Sir Hywel Evans (1971–1980)
- Sir Trevor Hughes (1980–1985)
- Sir Richard Lloyd-Jones (1985–1993)
- Sir Michael Scholar (1993–1996)
- Rachel Lomax (1996–1999)
- Sir Jon Shortridge (May–July 1999)
