= Wales Office =

Ministerial department of the UK Government

- Swyddfa Cymru (Welsh)

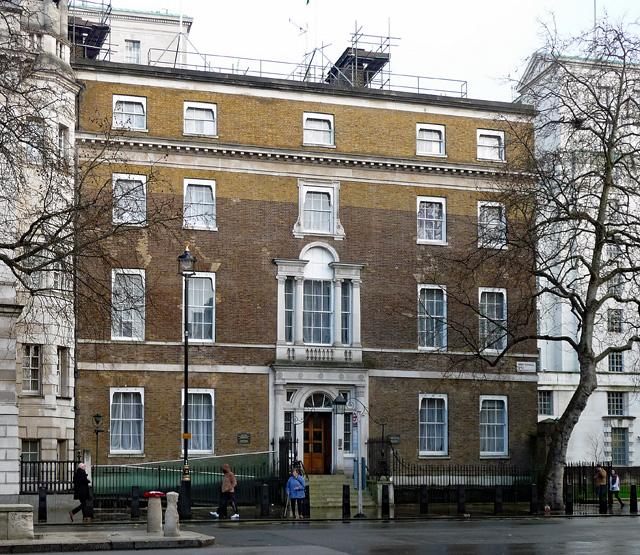
- Gwydyr House in Whitehall, London

Department overview
- Formed: 1 July 1999
- Preceding Department: Welsh Office
- Type: Ministerial department
- Jurisdiction: Wales
- Headquarters: Wales; Tŷ William Morgan, Central Square, Cardiff; Westminster; Gwydyr House, Whitehall, London
- Employees: 52 (2016–2017)
- Annual budget: £4.7 million for 2016–2017
- Secretary of State responsible: Stephen Kinnock MP, Secretary of State for Wales; Anna McMorrin MP, Parliamentary Under-Secretary of State for Wales
- Department executives: Ciarán Hayes, Director; Huw Bryer, Deputy Director, Constitution, Domestic Affairs and Regional Growth; Sarah Jennings, Deputy Director, Principal Private Secretary; Louise Parry, Deputy Director, Policy; Kate Starkey, Deputy Director, Policy
- Parent department: Ministry of Justice
- Website: gov.uk/wales-office

The Wales Office (Welsh: Swyddfa Cymru), known as the Office of the Secretary of State for Wales (Welsh: Swyddfa Ysgrifennydd Gwladol Cymru) between 2017 and 2024, is a department of His Majesty's Government. It replaced the former Welsh Office, which had extensive responsibility for governing Wales prior to Welsh devolution in 1999.

== History ==
In the past, the Office was called "Wales's voice in Westminster and Westminster's voice in Wales". However, it is significantly less powerful since the Government of Wales Act 2006: it is primarily responsible for carrying out the few functions remaining with the Secretary of State for Wales that have not been transferred already to the Senedd (Welsh Parliament); and for securing funds for Wales as part of the annual budgetary settlement.

The Secretary of State for Wales has overall responsibility for the office, but it is located administratively within the Ministry of Justice (until 2007, the Department for Constitutional Affairs).

== Ministers ==
The ministers in the Wales Office are as follows, with cabinet members in bold:

Minister	Portrait	Office	Portfolio
**Stephen Kinnock** MP		Secretary of State for Wales	Overall responsibility; Welsh Government and Senedd Liaison; Foreign Affairs; Defence.
Anna McMorrin MP		Parliamentary Under-Secretary of State for Wales	Supporting the Secretary of State in their duties
Claire Hughes MP		Parliamentary Under-Secretary of State for Wales	Supporting the Secretary of State in their duties

Unlike Scotland and Northern Ireland, Wales does not have its own Law Officers of the Crown; it is part of the England and Wales legal jurisdiction. The Attorney General for England and Wales, therefore, advises the United Kingdom Government on its law. That office-holder's deputy is the Solicitor General for England and Wales.

== Future ==
Following the "yes" vote in the 2011 referendum on giving the Assembly direct law-making powers, some politicians in Wales, particularly from Plaid Cymru, have called for the abolition of the Wales Office. Lord Elis-Thomas, Presiding Officer of the National Assembly for Wales, said:

Now that the responsibility of Ministers for administration of policy and indeed for legislation is here, it makes more sense for us to be organised in a proper inter-governmental and inter-parliamentary way. That is, Assembly to Westminster, Government to Government.

However, Lord Elis-Thomas was accused of following a "separatist agenda" by the Conservative Cheryl Gillan, then Secretary of State for Wales. She was supported by her Labour predecessor Peter Hain, who declared that Wales "still needs a voice around the Cabinet in Westminster".

In October 2026, the former First Minister Mark Drakeford said that he thought "the time has come for us to think about" the abolition of the Wales Office.
