= Anna McMorrin =

British politician (born 1971)

Anna McMorrin MP
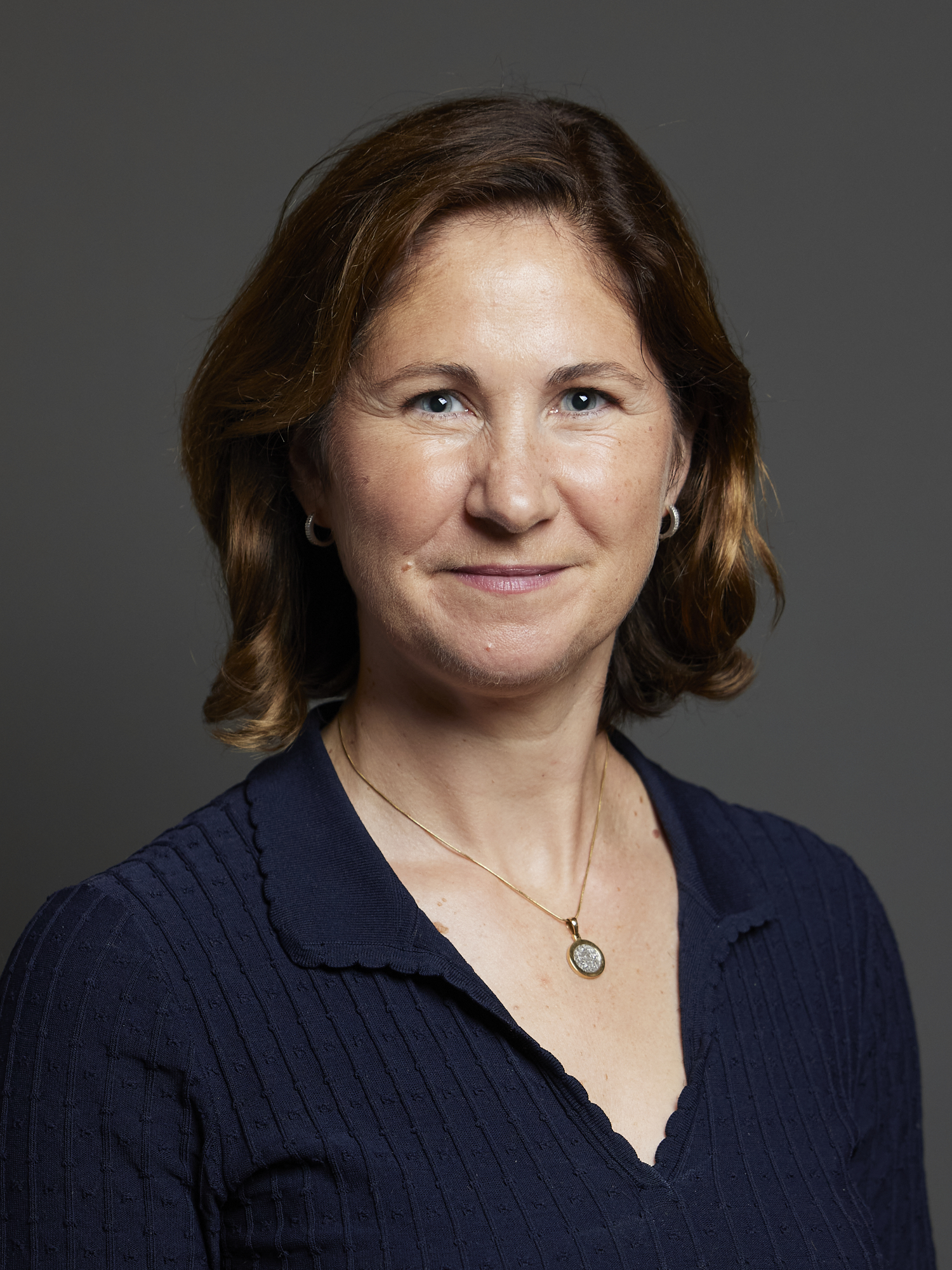
- Official portrait, 2024

Parliamentary Under-Secretary of State for Wales
- Incumbent
- Assumed office 7 September 2025 Serving with Claire Hughes
- Prime Minister: Keir Starmer; Andy Burnham
- Preceded by: Nia Griffith

Assistant Government Whip
- In office 10 July 2024 – 7 September 2025
- Prime Minister: Keir Starmer
Shadow Ministerial Roles
Shadow Minister for Latin America and the Caribbean
In office 7 September 2023 – 5 July 2024
Leader	Keir Starmer
Preceded by	Fabian Hamilton
Succeeded by	Vacant
Shadow Minister for Victims and Youth Justice
In office 14 May 2021 – 7 September 2023
Leader	Keir Starmer
Preceded by	Peter Kyle
Succeeded by	Kevin Brennan
Shadow Minister for International Development
In office 9 April 2020 – 14 May 2021
Leader	Keir Starmer
Preceded by	Preet Gill
Succeeded by	Yasmin Qureshi

Member of Parliament for Cardiff North
- Incumbent
- Assumed office 8 June 2017
- Preceded by: Craig Williams
- Majority: 11,207 (23.6%)

Personal details
- Born: 23 September 1971 (age 54) Brecon, Wales
- Party: Labour
- Children: 2
- Education: University of Southampton; Cardiff University
- Website: www.annamcmorrin.org

Anna Rhiannon McMorrin (born 23 September 1971) is a Welsh politician serving as the Member of Parliament (MP) for Cardiff North since 2017. A member of Welsh Labour, she serves as Parliamentary Under-Secretary of State for Wales since 2025.

She was previously Shadow Minister for Latin America and the Caribbean from 2023 to 2024, Shadow Minister for Victims and Youth Justice from 2021 to 2023 and Shadow Minister for International Development from 2020 to 2021.

== Early life ==
McMorrin grew up in Glasbury near Brecon. Her father, Ian McMorrin, worked for the British Antarctic Survey and is the eponym of the McMorrin Glacier. Having joined the Labour Party as a student, McMorrin graduated from the University of Southampton in 1994 with a BA in French and Politics. In 1997, she graduated from Cardiff University, with a post-graduate diploma in journalism.

== Career ==
After graduating, McMorrin worked in public relations and communications. After working as a part-time communications officer for the Labour Party between 1996 and 1997, she worked for public affairs consultancy for Hill and Knowlton. In 2006, McMorrin became Campaigns and Communications Director for Friends of the Earth Cymru.

In 2008, she joined the Welsh Government as an appointed Specialist Advisor, working with Ministers including Jane Hutt AM, John Griffiths AM and Alun Davies AM. In February 2016 she unsuccessfully sought the Labour nomination for Merthyr Tydfil and Rhymney Assembly constituency, losing out to Dawn Bowden.

McMorrin left the Welsh Government to become Director of Llais Ltd, and joining Invicta Public Affairs in October 2016.

== Parliamentary career ==
On 8 June 2017, McMorrin was elected as the Member of Parliament for Cardiff North.

Shortly after becoming an MP, McMorrin asked leader of the House of Commons, Andrea Leadsom, for an urgent debate about the 1,100 Tesco job losses in Cardiff North. McMorrin strongly opposed the decision, and asked for it to be reviewed. McMorrin was successful in gaining an urgent debate in the House of Commons on 19 July 2017, and in her speech said she wished to "highlight the way in which Tesco has acted; secondly, describe the human impact of these actions; and finally, explore how we respond to these things and the next steps.".

McMorrin is a member of the Environmental Audit Select Committee and joined the Welsh Affairs Select Committee on 24 October 2017 following criticism of both an unfilled committee and an all-male lineup.

McMorrin served as the Parliamentary Private Secretary (PPS) to Barry Gardiner, Shadow Secretary of State for International Trade, until her resignation in 2018. On 13 June 2018, McMorrin and five other Labour MPs resigned their roles as frontbenchers for the Labour Party in protest at Labour's Brexit position. Leader Jeremy Corbyn had instructed his MPs to abstain in a vote which Britain would remain in the single market by joining the European Economic Area (EEA). The MPs resigned and voted in favour of the EEA. McMorrin voted against the Labour Party whip and in favour of an amendment tabled by members of The Independent Group for a second public vote on EU membership in March 2019.

On 12 December 2019, McMorrin was re-elected as the Member of Parliament for Cardiff North with a slightly increased majority of 6,982. Upon Keir Starmer's election as Labour leader in April 2020, she was appointed as a Shadow Minister for International Development.

In a minor reshuffle in May 2021, McMorrin succeeded Peter Kyle as the Shadow Minister for Victims and Youth Justice.

At the 2024 general election, McMorrin was re-elected, following boundary changes to the constituency, with a reduced majority.

She is a member of the Fabian Society.

== Personal life ==
McMorrin has two daughters with her ex-husband. In 2014, she moved from her position in the Welsh Government Ministry for Natural Resources after starting a relationship with then Minister, Alun Davies, separating from him in 2020. She is a Welsh language learner, and speaks French and Spanish.

McMorrin is a member of the Unison and GMB trade unions, LGBT Labour, Labour Women's Network and the Cooperative Party.

Parliament of the United Kingdom
Preceded by Craig Williams	Member of Parliament for Cardiff North; 2017–present	Incumbent
