= Candidates in the 2024 United Kingdom general election =

Prospective parliamentary candidates were selected for the 2024 general election.

Due to the 2023 review of Westminster constituencies, most constituency boundaries changed at this election. The tables below show both the new and old constituency names. Candidates might have been selected on either the old or the new boundaries.

At the deadline on 7 June 2024, a total of 132 MPs announced they were standing down at the election. This included a record number of Conservative MPs. 29 former Members of Parliament intend to stand in the election. For the first time since 2015, there were no vacant seats at dissolution.

The deadline for candidates to be nominated was 16:00 BST on 7 June 2024.

A total of 4,515 candidates were nominated, more than in any previous general election. The previous record was 4,150 candidates in the 2010 general election.

== Parties ==
Parties	Number of candidates
Conservative and Unionist Party	635 (Note: Including 2 subsequently-disowned candidates)
Labour Party	631 (Note: Including 1 subsequently-disowned candidate) (Note: Includes candidates jointly nominated as Labour and Co-operative)
Liberal Democrats	630
Reform UK	609 (Note: Including 6 subsequently-disowned candidates and 2 who later withdrew)
Green Party of England and Wales	574 (Note: Including 1 subsequently-disowned candidate) (Note: Scottish Green Party, and Green Party Northern Ireland candidates counted separately. Number does not include a single independent candidate standing separately but endorsed by the Green Party of England and Wales)
Independents	459 across 317 different constituencies (Note: Includes one candidate who is a member of The Borough First, one candidate running for the Somerset Unionist Party but registered on the ballot paper as an independent, and one candidate who subsequently withdrew.)
Workers Party of Britain	152
Social Democratic Party	122
Scottish National Party	57
Co-operative Party	48 (Note: The Co-operative party is in an electoral pact with the Labour Party, all candidates are also standing for the Labour Party)
Scottish Greens	44 (Note: Green Party of England and Wales, and Green Party Northern Ireland candidates counted separately)
Heritage Party	41
Trade Unionist and Socialist Coalition	40
Plaid Cymru	32 (Note: Including 1 subsequently-disowned candidate)
Yorkshire Party	27
Rejoin EU	26
UKIP	24 (Note: Excludes 2 standing as joint candidates with the English Democrats, under banner "Patriots Alliance", since UKIP's own candidates list also excludes them – archived prior to UKIP password-protecting the page)
Christian Peoples Alliance	22
Official Monster Raving Loony Party	22
Alba Party	19
Alliance Party of Northern Ireland	18
Social Democratic and Labour Party	18
Ulster Unionist Party	17
Democratic Unionist Party	16
Party of Women	16
Scottish Family Party	16
English Democrats	15 (Note: Includes 2 standing as joint candidates with UKIP, under banner "Patriots Alliance")
Communist Party of Britain	14
Sinn Féin	14 (abstentionist party)
Traditional Unionist Voice	14
Climate Party	13
Liberal Party	12
Socialist Labour Party	12
Green Party Northern Ireland	11 (Note: Green Party of England and Wales, and Scottish Green Party candidates counted separately)
Aontú	10
Hampshire Independents	10
Alliance for Democracy and Freedom	9
Freedom Alliance	5
Independent Network	5
Workers Revolutionary Party	5
British Democrats	4
Animal Welfare Party	4
English Constitution Party	4
Scottish Libertarian Party	4
True and Fair Party	4
Women's Equality Party	4
Abolish the Welsh Assembly Party	3
People Before Profit	3
Alliance for Green Socialism	2
British Unionist Party	2
Christian Party	2
Communist League	2
Confelicity	2
Independence for Scotland Party	2
Libertarian Party	2
Lincolnshire Independents	2
One Leicester	2
Peace Party	2
Scottish Socialist Party	2
Shared Ground	2
Socialist Equality Party	2
Socialist Party of Great Britain	2
Sovereignty	2
Transform	2
Volt UK	2
Ashfield Independents	1 (Ashfield)
Blue Revolution Party	1 (Boston and Skegness)
Chesterfield and North Derbyshire Independents (CANDI)	1 (Chesterfield)
Cross-Community Labour Alternative	1 (Fermanagh and South Tyrone)
Communist Future	1 (Manchester Central)
Consensus	1 (Ashford)
Count Binface Party	1 (Richmond and Northallerton)
Democracy for Chorley	1 (Chorley)
Fairer Voting Party	1 (Folkestone and Hythe)
Independent Alliance (Kent)	1 (Tonbridge)
Independent Oxford Alliance	1 (Oxford East)
Independents for Direct Democracy	1 (Stockton West)
Kingston Independent Residents Group (KIRG)	1 (Kingston and Surbiton)
Liverpool Community Independents	1 (Liverpool Garston)
National Health Action Party	1 (Liverpool Riverside)
New Open Non-Political Organised Leadership	1 (Stratford-on-Avon)
Newham Independents Party	1 (West Ham and Beckton)
North East Party	1 (Easington)
Portsmouth Independents Party	1 (Portsmouth South)
Propel	1 (Cardiff West)
Psychedelic Movement	1 (Southend West and Leigh)
Putting Crewe First, Independent Residents Group	1 (Crewe and Nantwich)
Rebooting Democracy	1 (Cambridge)
Save Us Now	1 (Gateshead Central and Whickham)
Social Justice Party	1 (Scarborough and Whitby)
South Devon Alliance	1 (Newton Abbot)
Speaker	1 (Chorley)
Stockport Fights Austerity No To Cuts	1 (Stockport)
Swale Independents	1 (Sittingbourne and Sheppey)
Taking the Initiative Party	1 (Croydon West)
The Common People	1 (St Ives)
The Common Good	1 (Birmingham Northfield)
The Mitre TW9	1 (Richmond Park)
The Yoruba Party in the UK	1 (Peckham)
UK Voice	1 (South West Hertfordshire)

== Candidate selection process ==
Each party had its own selection process. The processes used by Labour and the Conservatives were described by PoliticsHome as "secretive" and "controversial".

In June 2022, former Channel 4 journalist Michael Crick launched a Twitter account called Tomorrow's MPs, documenting the selection process of parties candidates in the runup to the next general election.

=== Conservative ===
On 5 April 2023, Home Secretary and Fareham MP Suella Braverman defeated Meon Valley MP Flick Drummond by a majority of local party members of 77 to 54, to be preselected for the new seat of Fareham and Waterlooville. Drummond later won the contest to be selected for Winchester, a seat far more likely to be gained by the Liberal Democrats.

On 17 April 2023, Chairman of the Conservative Party Greg Hands announced the first 19 seats that would open selections. The seats were listed by ConservativeHome as Bicester and Woodstock, Calder Valley, Camborne and Redruth, Canterbury, Coventry South, Earley and Woodley, Eltham and Chislehurst, Hazel Grove, Hove and Portslade, Isle of Wight East, Kingston upon Hull West and Hessle, Milton Keynes South, Norwich North, Selby, South Cambridgeshire, South West Devon, Tamworth, West Bromwich and West Lancashire.

On 29 May, the Conservative Campaign Headquarters announced the next 24 seats that would open selections: Altrincham and Sale West, Bishop Auckland, Bromsgrove, Broxbourne, Chippenham, Coventry North West, Eastleigh, Esher and Walton, Exeter East and Exmouth, Halifax, Hendon, Henley, Mid Bedfordshire, Newport West and Islwyn, Norwich South, Reigate, Rugby, Scarborough and Whitby, South Shropshire, Stevenage, Stoke-on-Trent Central, Walsall and Bloxwich, West Suffolk and Wolverhampton West.

On 2 June 2023, Bromsgrove Conservatives began their selection process for a candidate.

On 12 June, Boris Johnson resigned as an MP, triggering a by-election. The same day, Nigel Adams also resigned as an MP. On 19 June, David Warburton gave up his seat in Parliament.

On 11 August, the Conservatives opened selections for 26 seats: Alyn and Deeside, Bridlington and The Wolds, Bristol North West, Bury South, Clwyd North, Colchester, Crawley, Croydon East, Doncaster North, Dorking and Horley, Frome and East Somerset, Glastonbury and Somerton, Heywood and Middleton North, Huntingdon, Leeds East, Leeds West and Pudsey, Mid Cheshire, North West Leicestershire, Pontefract, Castleford and Knottingley, Richmond Park, Sittingbourne and Sheppey, Southampton Itchen, St Albans, Wakefield and Rothwell, Waveney Valley and Wirral West.

Nadine Dorries announced her intentions to resign and officially resigned on 29 August. Chris Pincher left Parliament on 7 September.

On 22 September, nominations opened in 10 seats: Bath, Bolton South and Walkden, Bridgend, Coventry South, Lancaster and Wyre, Norwich North, Telford, West Bromwich, Westmorland and Lonsdale and Wimbledon.

On 30 September 2023, The Telegraph reported that the Conservatives had only selected 65 candidates out of their target of 100 before the Conservative Party Conference.

On 13 October 2023, nominations opened in 18 seats: Bristol North East, Cardiff North, Cardiff West, Chester North and Neston, City of Durham, Croydon West, Dwyfor Meirionnydd, Gower, Hampstead and Highgate, Harrow West, Leicester East, Mid Cheshire, Nottingham East, Oxford West and Abingdon, Queens Park and Maida Vale, Wirral West, Wolverhampton South East and Wolverhampton West.

On 23 November 2023, Nick Rose, who had been the candidate for Norwich North, resigned.

In late 2023, two candidates were removed after MI5 warned in 2021 that they were potential Chinese spies. In April 2024, the selection process was internally criticised by party members for "purging Brexit-backing candidates". The preferred selection of One Nation Conservatives by the party leadership over right-wing candidates was reported on. This included the former Deputy Leader of the UK Independence Party and Conservative MEP David Campbell Bannerman who was blocked in South Norfolk.

On 28 May 2024, it was reported that the Conservatives had 183 candidates to select.

On 28 May 2024, presenter Iain Dale announced that he would be stepping back from his LBC radio show to run as a Conservative candidate in the election, hoping to stand in the seat of Tunbridge Wells, where he lives. However on 31 May he announced that he had decided not to put his name on the shortlist after comments he had made about Tunbridge Wells, two years earlier, emerged online. In the clip he had said that he didn't like living in the town he was running in. Dale defended himself by stating that "there is a context to it, but nobody's interested in context or nuance in these situations".

By 7 June, the Conservatives had filled all seats with candidates in Great Britain except for Rotherham. Laila Cunningham was originally selected as the Conservative candidate for the seat, but withdrew shortly before the nominations deadline. As the party did not field a replacement, it is the only seat in Great Britain aside from the Speaker's seat of Chorley in which no Conservative candidate was nominated.

=== Labour ===
In March 2021, the local parties in East Ham and West Ham were suspended following allegations of electoral fraud, disbanding the internal selections committee. This was a precursor to contentious selections across East London, between centrist supporters of Keir Starmer and Momentum-backed supporters of former leader Jeremy Corbyn.

The Labour Party selected many prospective parliamentary candidates throughout 2022.

In July 2022, a trigger ballot was held in Ilford South to determine whether MP Sam Tarry should face reselection; Tarry lost the vote by 57.5% to 42.5%. On 10 October 2022 a reselection vote was held, which Tarry lost to local council leader Jas Athwal by 361 votes to 499. In late 2022, councillor Dominic Beck stood down as Labour PPC for Rother Valley.

By 1 January 2023, a total of 77 Constituency Labour Parties had selected prospective parliamentary candidates.

In February 2023, BBC News reported that local Labour parties were being overruled over parliamentary selections by "a clique in London". Nine members of the selection committee in Bolton North East Parliamentary Labour Party resigned after the national party imposed a shortlist on them. The main contention was over the fact that Leigh Drennan, the chair of North West Labour, was not shortlisted despite being endorsed by Deputy Labour Leader Angela Rayner.

In March 2023, Labour's national executive committee resolved not to endorse Jeremy Corbyn for Islington North in the next general election, preventing him from seeking re-election as a Labour candidate. Labour later chose Praful Nargund as their candidate, which was shortly followed by Corbyn announcing his intention to run as an independent in the constituency.

On 23 May 2023, eleven members of the Copeland local Labour Party executive resigned following the decision of the National Executive Committee of the Labour Party not to longlist local councillor Joseph Ghayouba for selection. Local officials said it showed a "shameless disregard for democracy" by Labour's national ruling body. On 6 June 2023, former Copeland PPC Gillian Troughton withdrew from the selection in Whitehaven and Workington, describing the selection process as "frustrating and ultimately disenfranchising".

On 26 May 2023, the Wirral West Constituency Labour Party was suspended by the national party, following complaints. This was the same week that the local MP Margaret Greenwood announced that she was standing down at the next general election. As Wirral South was abolished, incumbent MP Alison McGovern challenged neighbouring MP Mick Whitley for the nomination in Birkenhead. Whitley was deselected on 16 June 2023.

On 7 June 2023, MP for Merthyr Tydfil and Rhymney Gerald Jones defeated MP for Cynon Valley Beth Winter for his party's selection to become the Labour candidate for the new parliamentary seat of Merthyr Tydfil and Aberdare, which will be contested at the 2024 general election. The seat was renamed from Merthyr Tydfil and Upper Cynon in the final recommendations.

From 15 to 16 July, 100 Labour PPCs were given a weekend for a crash course in "message discipline, media training and the art of campaigning" in Stratford-upon-Avon.

On 27 July 2023, Labour opened selections for 94 "non-priority" parliamentary seats. On 31 August 2023, Labour suspended the CLP in Leicester East amid the process of selecting a new candidate to replace Claudia Webbe.

On 5 September 2023, Labour suspended its leadership team in the Bolton North East constituency following a disagreement over the selection of a prospective parliamentary candidate.

On 8 December 2023, Labour opened selections for 211 'non-battleground' parliamentary seats.

In March 2024, Joel Bodmer withdrew from the selection process in Croydon East alleging abuse. This was following an unauthorised breach of data.

By 22 May 2024, LabourList reported that approximately 100 seats did not have Labour candidates announced yet.

On 31 May 2024, Faiza Shaheen was removed as the candidate for Chingford and Woodford Green. There was media speculation over the future of Diane Abbott, but she confirmed she would be standing.

By 7 June, Labour had filled all seats in Great Britain (except that held by the Speaker) with candidates.

=== Liberal Democrats ===
President of the Liberal Democrats Mark Pack lists prospective parliamentary candidates on his website.

In March 2024, Liberal Democrat PPC for South Shropshire Chris Naylor stood down due to ill health.

By 7 June, the Liberal Democrats had filled all seats with candidates in Great Britain except for Manchester Rusholme and Chorley.

=== Scottish National Party ===
SNP MPs are not automatically reselected to stand, the party has a full open reselection process. To be nominated to take part in a selection contest a party member requires either a nomination by their local campaigns committee, or 50 local branch members.

On 25 August 2023, Patrick Grady was not approved as a candidate for the 2024 general election. Glasgow Central MP Alison Thewliss ultimately won the selection contest in his seat of Glasgow North. East Kilbride, Strathaven and Lesmahagow MP Lisa Cameron criticised the "party hierarchy" when she faced a reselection challenge, like many sitting members, per the party rules, claiming she had spoken out about Grady. She claimed she had been ostracised by the party leadership and threatened to resign and call by-election in protest. Cameron was challenged by Grant Costello, a digital manager for the SNP's Westminster group who lives in the constituency. Costello was endorsed by MSPs Christina McKelvie and Collette Stevenson. Ultimately, on 12 October 2023, Cameron — a social conservative — left the SNP altogether and defected to the Conservatives, two hours before the two weeks of voting was due to conclude. Grant Costello, who was leading in the voting, won the selection for SNP candidate for the new seat of East Kilbride and Strathaven. Cameron was reportedly not standing for Parliament again. The same day 8 other candidates were also announced.

Argyll and Bute MP Brendan O'Hara was challenged for reselection by Helensburgh councillor Math Campbell-Sturgess. In Glasgow East, David Linden won a selection contest against neighbouring MP Alison Thewliss, whose constituency was split into seven.

In Falkirk, two SNP councillors Gary Bouse and Paul Garner launched their campaign to succeed John McNally. Toni Giugliano was cleared of breaking selection rules.

On the eve of the 2023 Rutherglen and Hamilton West by-election Mhairi Black reportedly threatened to quit the SNP. This was over her wishes to be succeeded as SNP candidate for Paisley and Renfrewshire South by her senior adviser Robert Innes. Jacqueline Cameron, the depute leader of Renfrewshire Council stood against him. On 26 October 2023, Cameron was declared selected by 60%.

By April 2024, candidates had been selected for all 57 new constituencies.

=== Green Party of England and Wales ===
The Green Party of England and Wales confirmed in January 2024 that it aims to field candidates in all 575 constituencies in England and Wales.

The Green Party of England and Wales nominated a candidate in 574 of the 575 constituencies in England and Wales, including Chorley where the Speaker is standing to defend his seat without opposition from the Conservatives, Labour, the Lib Dems, or Reform. The only constituency in England and Wales where the Greens are not standing a candidate of their own is Heywood and North Middleton, where they endorsed independent candidate Chris Furlong.

=== Scottish Greens ===
The Scottish Greens stood a record number of candidates, a candidate in 44 of 57 constituencies in Scotland.

=== Green Party Northern Ireland ===
The Green Party Northern Ireland also stood in a record number of seats in Northern Ireland, a candidate in 11 of 18 constituencies in Northern Ireland.

=== Plaid Cymru ===
Plaid Cymru Leader Rhun ap Iorwerth was named as the candidate for Ynys Môn. In October 2023 he was replaced as candidate by Llinos Medi.

=== Reform UK ===
For the 2019 general election, the Brexit Party (the former name of Reform UK) did not stand candidates in seats where the Conservative party won in 2017. Leader Richard Tice ruled out a similar arrangement for this election, and stated his party's intention to stand in 630 seats.

The party pulled some of its prospective candidates for controversial social media comments. However, it also gave its support to other parliamentary candidates that are standing for the party that have spread conspiracy theories.

After media speculation on the question, honorary president and former leader Nigel Farage declared he would not be standing as a candidate. Farage later announced on 3 June that, contrary to his statement earlier in the campaign, he would stand for Parliament in Clacton, and that he had resumed leadership of Reform UK. He also said that Labour would win the election.

Since January 2024, it was reported that Reform UK had pulled over 100 candidates. Just before the deadline they were 80 candidates short of the total they intended to reach.

=== Workers Party of Britain ===
During his victory speech following the 2024 Rochdale by-election, George Galloway claimed his Workers Party had 59 candidates ready to contest a general election. Later, in a tweet from 2 March Galloway confirmed that this total increased to 79. As of June the party listed over 250 candidates, and also supporting a number of independent candidates, most notably Jeremy Corbyn in Islington North, Faiza Shaheen in Chingford and Woodford Green, and Andrew Feinstein in Holborn and St Pancras.

=== Sinn Fein ===
Sinn Féin did not contest four constituencies; Belfast East, Belfast South and Mid Down, Lagan Valley and North Down.

=== Democratic Unionist Party ===
The Democratic Unionist Party did not contest Fermanagh and South Tyrone, instead endorsing Ulster Unionist Party candidate Diana Armstrong. The DUP stood aside in North Down in order to support the bid of independent unionist candidate Alex Easton, who had stood unsuccessfully for the DUP for the seat in 2017 and 2019.

=== Ulster Unionist Party ===
The Ulster Unionist Party stood candidates, denied any electoral pacts and explained their lack of a candidate in Belfast North as being down to a lack of party infrastructure on the ground in the constituency.

=== Other parties ===
Gina Miller's True and Fair party planned to contest a small number of constituencies.

The British Democrats confirmed three parliamentary candidates in the 2024 general election.

The Christian Peoples Alliance stated they aimed to stand in 100 seats. After the close of nominations they had 22 candidates.

The English Democrats, Heritage Party, Climate Party, Transform, TUSC, Liberal Party, UK Independence Party, the Animal Welfare Party, Official Monster Raving Loony Party and the Communist Party of Britain ran candidates.

The Wessex Regionalists announced they would not stand candidates, citing the strong likelihood of a Labour victory leaving little interest in alternative parties.

=== Independents ===
Jeremy Corbyn stood as an independent in Islington North. Other sitting MPs who stood as independents (rather than within the party they represented at the 2019 General Election) included Andrew Bridgen, Angus MacNeil, and Claudia Webbe.

On 5 June, former Labour candidate Faiza Shaheen, who had been deselected in Chingford and Woodford Green due to her social media history which the party alleged displayed a history of downplaying antisemitism, announced her independent candidacy.

== Candidates by demographic ==
=== Gender ===
The proportion of female candidates decreased to 30%. In Northern Ireland, one third of the candidates were women.

== Candidate changes ==
=== MPs not standing for re-election ===
By 7 June 2024, a total of 132 Members of Parliament announced their intention not to stand for re-election. Four MPs — Nadine Dorries, Nigel Adams, Chris Skidmore (all Conservative) and Chris Pincher (independent, elected as Conservative) — announced their intention not to stand again but later resigned from Parliament before the election and are not included in the figures below. This general election marks the first time that no sitting MPs from the Liberal Democrats stood down since their formation in 1988.

Number of MPs standing down by party affiliation
Party	MPs standing down	
Party	Elected (Note: Party affiliation of retiring MPs at the time of the 2019 general election.)	Final
Conservative	80	75
Labour	35	33
Independent	0	10
SNP	10	9
Sinn Féin	3	3
Plaid Cymru	2	1
Green	1	1
DUP	1	0
Total	132	

=== MPs deselected or seeking a new constituency ===
Some sitting MPs were not selected by their party to recontest their seat (or a successor seat). Options available to these MPs included standing down, challenging their non-selection, seeking selection for another seat, and contesting the election under a different banner.

Members of Parliament deselected, suspended or expelled
MP	Constituency	First elected	Party (as elected)	Reason
Richard Bacon	South Norfolk	2001	Conservative	Deselected by the constituency's Conservative Association and subsequently announced he would stand down
Andrew Bridgen	North West Leicestershire	2010	Conservative	Expelled from the Conservative Party and now sits as an independent MP after joining the Reclaim Party for a time; he plans to contest his seat at the next election as an independent
Jeremy Corbyn	Islington North	1983	Labour	Excluded from selection by the National Executive Committee of the Labour Party; Corbyn sits as an independent but remained a party member until May 2024, when he was expelled after announcing he would contest Islington North as an independent
Geraint Davies	Swansea West	2010	Labour	Excluded from selection; sat as an independent.
Jonathan Djanogly	Huntingdon	2001	Conservative	Deselected by the Conservative Association and subsequently announced his retirement
David Duguid	Banff and Buchan	2017	Conservative	Deselected due to his health issues.
Patrick Grady	Glasgow North	2015	SNP	Deselected by the local party in favour of MP for Glasgow Central Alison Thewliss
Angus MacNeil	Na h-Eileanan an Iar	2005	SNP	Expelled from the SNP and sits as an independent with the Scotland United grouping with the Alba Party; he plans to contest the next election
Christina Rees	Neath	2015	Labour Co-op	Excluded from selection by the National Executive Committee of the Labour Party; in January 2024, she announced that she would stand down at the next general election
Lloyd Russell-Moyle	Brighton Kemptown	2017	Labour Co-op	Blocked from standing for re-election following a "serious complaint".
Sam Tarry	Ilford South	2019	Labour	Deselected by the Constituency Labour Party in favour of Jas Athwal
Claudia Webbe	Leicester East	2019	Labour	Expelled from the Labour Party due to a criminal conviction and sits as an independent
Mick Whitley	Birkenhead	2019	Labour	Sought selection for the redrawn seat of Birkenhead, losing to fellow MP Alison McGovern
Beth Winter	Cynon Valley	2019	Labour	Sought selection for the new seat of Merthyr Tydfil and Aberdare, losing to fellow MP Gerald Jones

=== MPs standing under a different political affiliation from 2019 ===
MP	First elected	2019 party	2019 constituency	2024 party	2024 constituency	Result
Lee Anderson	2019	Conservative	Ashfield	Reform	Ashfield	Reform gain
Andrew Bridgen	2010	Conservative	North West Leicestershire	Independent	North West Leicestershire	Labour gain
Jeremy Corbyn	1983	Labour	Islington North	Independent	Islington North	Independent gain
Neale Hanvey	2019	SNP	Kirkcaldy and Cowdenbeath	Alba	Cowdenbeath and Kirkcaldy	Labour gain
Julian Knight	2015	Conservative	Solihull	Independent	Solihull West and Shirley	Conservative hold
Kenny MacAskill	2019	SNP	East Lothian	Alba	Alloa and Grangemouth	Labour gain
Angus MacNeil	2005	SNP	Na h-Eileanan an Iar	Independent	Na h-Eileanan an Iar	Labour gain
Rob Roberts	2019	Conservative	Delyn	Independent	Clwyd East	Labour gain
Christian Wakeford	2019	Conservative	Bury South	Labour	Bury South	Labour gain
Claudia Webbe	2019	Labour	Leicester East	Independent	Leicester East	Conservative gain

=== Deselected and disowned candidates ===
A number of prospective candidates had support withdrawn from their party before the election:

Date	Party	Candidate	Seat	Reason
November 2023	Liberal Democrats	David Campanale	Sutton and Cheam	Prior involvement with the Christian Peoples Alliance.
23 November 2023	Conservative	Nick Rose	Norwich North	Transphobic comments made during a hustings.
21 February 2024	Reform UK	David Carpin	Henley and Thame	Homophobic and transphobic social media posts from 2023.
21 March 2024	Reform UK	Ginny Ball	Rutland and Stamford	Alleged racist and xenophobic social media posts from 2023.
22 March 2024	Reform UK	Benjamin Dade	South Swindon	Xenophobic comments made on a far-right news website in 2022.
4 April 2024	Reform UK	Mick Greenhough	Orpington	Islamophobic social media posts from 2023.
4 April 2024	Reform UK	Jonathan Kay	South Ribble	Racist and Islamophobic social media posts from 2019.
4 April 2024	Reform UK	Julie Wilson	York Outer	Alleged inactivity.
7 April 2024	Reform UK	Iris Leask	Aberdeen South	Comments regarding animal rights and cannibalism from 2021.
9 April 2024	Reform UK	Amodio Amato	Stevenage	Islamophobic social media posts regarding Sadiq Khan and Humza Yousaf.
9 April 2024	Reform UK	Pete Addis	South Shropshire	Racist and sexist social media posts.
9 April 2024	Reform UK	Stephen McNamara	Kilmarnock and Loudon	Transphobic social media posts.
9 April 2024	Reform UK	David McNabb	Mid Dunbartonshire	Allegedly endorsed Islamophobic social media posts.
10 April 2024	Labour	Wilma Brown	Cowdenbeath and Kirkcaldy	Allegedly endorsed racist and Islamophobic social media posts.
15 April 2024	Reform UK	Jack Denny	Leeds Central and Headingley	Prior conviction.
15 April 2024	Reform UK	Ian Broadbent	Kingston upon Hull East	Offensive online comments.
15 April 2024	Reform UK	Richard Hainsworth	Bradford South	Offensive online comments.
27 April 2024	Reform UK	Paul Carnell	Cannock Chase	Suspended for participating in an anti-refugee demonstration with Patriotic Alternative.
23 May 2024	Labour	Graham Jones	Hyndburn	Alleged Antisemitic comments.
24 May 2024	Green	Naseem Talukdar	Bristol East	Antisemitic social media posts.
25 May 2024	Workers Party of Britain	Hassan Chahine	Putney	Antisemitic social media posts.
29 May 2024	Labour	Faiza Shaheen	Chingford and Woodford Green	Allegedly liking a series of posts on X that downplayed antisemitism accusations. Shaheen then stood as an independent candidate for the same seat.
30 May 2024	Reform UK	Peter Storms	Bournemouth West	Online comments.
31 May 2024	Reform UK	Andrew Medley	Broxtowe	Reason unknown.
3 June 2024	Reform UK	Tony Mack	Clacton	Deselected in favour of party leader Nigel Farage. Mack stood as an independent candidate in the same seat.
4 June 2024	Labour	Darren Rodwell	Barking	Racist comments in the past and allegations of sexual harassment. Later withdrew as candidate.
7 June 2024	Nominations of candidates close. Candidates disowned by their respective parties from 7 June will still appear on the ballot paper as their party candidate.			
7 June 2024	Plaid Cymru	Sharifah Rahman	Cardiff South and Penarth	Social media posts about the "situation in the Middle East".
7 June 2024	Reform UK	Hugo Miller	Horsham	Alleged racist social media posts.
16 June 2024	Reform UK	Grant StClair-Armstrong	North West Essex	Resigned after discovery of comments where he encouraged people to vote for the British National Party.
19 June 2024	Labour	Andy Brown	Aberdeenshire North and Moray East	Suspended over "pro-Russian" comments online.
21 June 2024	Green	Chris Brody	Chingford and Woodford Green	Suspended after confessing to sexual assault.
25 June 2024	Conservative	Craig Williams	Montgomeryshire and Glyndŵr	Implication in election betting scandal.
25 June 2024	Conservative	Laura Saunders	Bristol North West	Implication in election betting scandal.
25 June 2024	Labour	Kevin Craig	Central Suffolk and North Ipswich	Suspended after the Gambling Commission launched an investigation, having bet on himself to lose in the election.
27 June 2024	Reform UK	Raymond Saint	Basingstoke	Discovered to having been a BNP member on list published in 2009.
29 June 2024	Reform UK	Edward Oakenfull	Derbyshire Dales	Allegedly derogatory remarks about the IQ of sub-Saharan Africans.
29 June 2024	Reform UK	Robert Lomas	Barnsley North	Allegedly racist remarks against black people.
29 June 2024	Reform UK	Leslie Lilley	Southend East and Rochford	Comments about people arriving in the UK on small boats.

=== Withdrawn candidates ===
A number of prospective parliamentary candidates withdrew before the election was called. Candidates suspended or attempting to withdraw their candidacy after 7 June 2024 will still appear on their respective ballot papers but will no longer receive their party's support.

Date	Party	Candidate	Seat	Reason
16 June 2023	Plaid Cymru	Rhun ap Iorwerth	Ynys Môn	Stood down after election as Leader of Plaid Cymru.
12 March 2024	Liberal Democrats	Chris Naylor	South Shropshire	Health issues.
8 April 2024	Green	Zoe Leventhal	Kenilworth and Southam	Family reasons.
13 April 2024	Reform UK	Joe Dyas	Shrewsbury	Prior social media posts supporting the British National Party.
15 April 2024	Reform UK	Trevor Nicholls	Warrington North	Controversial comments.
6 May 2024	Reform UK	Richard Carr	Poole	Time issues.
8 May 2024	Workers Party of Britain	Monty Panesar	Ealing Southall	Personal political issues.
17 May 2024	Labour	Ben Hartley	Altrincham and Sale West	Personal reasons.
23 May 2024	Workers Party of Britain	Wayne Adlem	Bournemouth East	Time issues.
25 May 2024	Labour	Alexandra Aldridge-Gibbons	Henley and Thame	Personal reasons.
28 May 2024	Labour	Alex Aitken	Birmingham Northfield	Personal reasons.
29 May 2024	Green	Anna Jacobs	Wetherby and Easingwold	Injuries sustained in a car accident.
4 June 2024	Labour	Georgia Meadows	Witney	Personal reasons.
6 June 2024	Conservative	Sam Trask	Bridgend	Withdrawn after lurid comments about women were exposed.
7 June 2024	Conservative	Adam Gregg	Spen Valley	Withdrawn after sharing inappropriate photos from kids' club nights.
7 June 2024	Conservative	Laila Cunningham	Rotherham	Withdrawn due to a change in circumstances.
7 June 2024	Reform UK	Stewart Sutherland	Blaenau Gwent and Rhymney	Online comments.
7 June 2024	Reform UK	Tom Wellings	Stone, Great Wyrley and Penkridge	Withdrawn after defecting to the Conservatives (and supporting Gavin Williamson).
7 June 2024	Nominations closed and deadline to replace withdrawn candidates passed.			
30 June 2024	Reform UK	Liam Booth-Isherwood	Erewash	Candidate disowned the Reform UK party and endorsed the Conservatives after what he described as 'reports of widespread racism and sexism' within the Reform party'.
2 July 2024	Reform UK	Georgie David	West Ham and Beckton	Candidate suspended her campaign and endorsed the Conservatives, alleging the "vast majority" of Reform candidates are "racist, misogynistic and bigoted", whilst defending the party's leadership.

== Former MPs seeking to return to Parliament ==
Former Members of Parliament
MP	Target constituency	Years elected	Party	Explanation	Result
Douglas Alexander	East Lothian	1997–2015	Labour	Served as a Labour MP for Paisley South (1997–2005) and Paisley and Renfrewshire South (2005–2015), both constituencies unrelated to East Lothian. Defeated by the SNP in 2015.	Elected
Heidi Alexander	Swindon South	2010–2018	Labour	Served as a Labour MP for Lewisham East, an unrelated constituency, from 2010 to 2018 when she stood down from Parliament to become Deputy Mayor of London for Transport.	Elected
Gordon Birtwistle	Burnley	2010–2015	Liberal Democrats	Served as a Liberal Democrat MP for Burnley from 2010 to 2015, when he was defeated by Labour.	Not elected
Mary Creagh	Coventry East	2005–2019	Labour	Served as a Labour MP for Wakefield, an unrelated constituency, from 2005 to 2019 when she was defeated by the Conservatives.	Elected
Nic Dakin	Scunthorpe	2010–2019	Labour	Served as a Labour MP for Scunthorpe from 2010 to 2019, when he was defeated by the Conservatives.	Elected
Emma Dent Coad	Kensington and Bayswater	2017–2019	Independent	Served as a Labour MP for Kensington, the predecessor constituency to Kensington and Bayswater, from 2017 to 2019 when she was defeated by the Conservatives. Left the Labour Party in 2023.	Not elected
James Frith	Bury North	2017–2019	Labour	Served as a Labour MP for Bury North from 2017 to 2019, when he was defeated by the Conservatives.	Elected
Andrew George	St Ives	1997–2015	Liberal Democrats	Served as a Liberal Democrat MP for St Ives from 1997 to 2015 when he was defeated by the Conservatives.	Elected
Stephen Gethins	Arbroath and Broughty Ferry	2015–2019	SNP	Served as a SNP MP for North East Fife, a close-by but non-contiguous constituency, from 2015 to 2019 when he was defeated by the Liberal Democrats.	Elected
Parmjit Singh Gill	West Bromwich	2004–2005	Liberal Democrats	Served as a Liberal Democrat MP for the unrelated Leicester South seat from his victory in the 2004 by-election before being defeated by Labour at the general election the following year.	Not elected
Luke Graham	Perth and Kinross-shire	2017–2019	Conservative	Served as a Conservative MP for Ochil and South Perthshire, one of the predecessor seats to Perth and Kinross-shire, from 2017 to 2019 when he was defeated by the SNP.	Not elected
Matthew Green	South Shropshire	2001–2005	Liberal Democrats	Served as a Liberal Democrat MP for Ludlow, the predecessor constituency to South Shropshire, from 2001 to 2005 when he was defeated by the Conservatives.	Not elected
John Grogan	Keighley and Ilkley	2017–2019	Labour	Served as a Labour MP for Keighley, the predecessor constituency to Keighley & Ilkley from 2017 to 2019, when he was defeated by the Conservatives. Additionally served as the MP for Selby from 1997 to 2010	Not elected
George Kerevan	East Lothian	2015–2017	Alba	Served as SNP MP for East Lothian from 2015 to 2017, when he was defeated by Labour.	Not elected
Stephen Kerr	Angus and Perthshire Glens	2017–2019	Conservative	Served as a Conservative MP for Stirling, an neighbouring constituency, from 2017 to 2019 when he was defeated by the SNP.	Not elected
Naomi Long	Belfast East	2010–2015	Alliance	Served as an Alliance MP for Belfast East from 2010 to 2015 when she was defeated by the DUP.	Not elected
Tania Mathias	Maidenhead	2015–2017	Conservative	Served as a Conservative MP for Twickenham, an unrelated constituency, from 2015 to 2017 when she was defeated by the Liberal Democrats.	Not elected
Tessa Munt	Wells and Mendip Hills	2010–2015	Liberal Democrats	Served as a Liberal Democrat MP for Wells, the predecessor constituency to Wells and Mendip Hills, from 2010 to 2015 when she was defeated by the Conservatives.	Elected
Pamela Nash	Motherwell and Wishaw	2010–2015	Labour	Served as a Labour MP for Airdrie and Shotts from 2010 to 2015 when she was defeated by the Scottish National Party.	Elected
Dave Nellist	Coventry East	1983–1992	TUSC	Served as a Labour MP for Coventry South East from 1983 to 1992 when he was defeated by Labour after being expelled from the party.	Not elected
Dan Norris	North East Somerset and Hanham	1997–2010	Labour	Served as a Labour MP for Wansdyke, one of the predecessor constituency to North East Somerset and Hanham, from 1997 to 2010 when he was defeated by the Conservatives in the predecessor constituency of North East Somerset.	Elected
Melanie Onn	Great Grimsby and Cleethorpes	2015–2019	Labour	Served as a Labour MP for Great Grimsby, the predecessor constituency to Great Grimsby and Cleethorpes, from 2015 to 2019 when she was defeated by the Conservatives.	Elected
Andrew Pelling	Croydon East	2005–2010	Liberal Democrats	Served as a Conservative MP for Croydon Central, the predecessor constituency to Croydon East, from 2005 to 2010 when he unsuccessfully stood for reelection as an independent. Joined Labour in 2011 and the Liberal Democrats in 2023.	Not elected
Jo Platt	Leigh and Atherton	2017–2019	Labour	Served as a Labour MP for Leigh, the predecessor constituency to Leigh and Atherton, from 2017 to 2019 when she was defeated by the Conservatives.	Elected
Alan Reid	Argyll, Bute and South Lochaber	2001–2015	Liberal Democrats	Served as a Liberal Democrat MP for Argyll and Bute, the predecessor constituency to Argyll, Bute and South Lochaber, from 2001 to 2015 when he was defeated by the SNP.	Not elected
Emma Reynolds	Wycombe	2010–2019	Labour	Served as a Labour MP for Wolverhampton North East, an unrelated constituency, from 2010 to 2019 when she was defeated by the Conservatives.	Elected
Gareth Snell	Stoke-on-Trent Central	2017–2019	Labour	Served as a Labour MP for Stoke-on-Trent Central from 2017 to 2019, when he was defeated by the Conservatives.	Elected
Anna Turley	Redcar	2015–2019	Labour	Served as a Labour MP for Redcar from 2015 to 2019, when she was defeated by the Conservatives.	Elected
Keith Vaz	Leicester East	1987–2019	One Leicester	Served as a Labour MP for the pre-2024 Leicester East constituency from 1987 to 2019 (finished his tenure suspended from Labour as an independent).	Not elected
Mark Williams	Ceredigion Preseli	2005–2017	Liberal Democrats	Served as a Liberal Democrat MP for Ceredigion, the predecessor constituency to Ceredigion Preseli, from 2005 to 2017 when he was defeated by Plaid Cymru.	Not elected
Chris Williamson	Derby South	2010–2015, 2017–2019	Workers Party	Served as a Labour MP for Derby North, a neighbouring constituency, from 2010 to 2015 and from 2017 to 2019, when he was defeated by the Conservatives. Left the Labour Party in 2019 and joined the Workers Party in 2023.	Not elected
Corri Wilson	Ayr, Carrick and Cumnock	2015–2017	Alba	Served as an SNP MP for Ayr, Carrick and Cumnock from 2015 to 2017, when she was defeated by the Conservatives. Left the SNP to join Alba in 2021.	Not elected

== MPs changing constituencies ==
Due to boundary changes, most MPs standing for re-election sought to represent a seat at least slightly different from their present seat. However, in some cases sitting MPs secured selection to stand in a substantially or completely different seat from their present seat. They may happen because their seat is marginal and likely to be lost by their party, losing preselection to another candidate, boundary changes abolished their present seat or their present seat was redrawn in an unfavourable way in boundary changes.

Members of Parliament changing constituencies
MP	Former constituency	First elected	Party (as elected)	New constituency	Note	Winner at election
Stuart Anderson	Wolverhampton South West	2019	Conservative	South Shropshire	While there are no significant changes to Anderson's former seat, it is a marginal Conservative seat, whereas South Shropshire is likely a safe Conservative seat. He had initially announced he would not stand for re-election but subsequently reversed his decision.	Conservative
Stuart Andrew	Pudsey	2010	Conservative	Daventry	Andrew's former seat of Pudsey was split across two new seats, which are Leeds North West and Leeds West and Pudsey. However, Andrew is instead contesting Daventry in Northamptonshire, which is unrelated to his former seat. He had initially announced he would not stand for re-election but subsequently reversed his decision.	Conservative
Simon Baynes	Clwyd South	2019	Conservative	North Shropshire	Selected for North Shropshire after his previous seat was abolished in boundary changes. North Shropshire, which the Liberal Democrats gained in a 2021 by-election, contains none of Baynes' present seat.	Liberal Democrats
Chris Clarkson	Heywood and Middleton	2019	Conservative	Stratford-on-Avon	Initially announced he would not stand for re-election. Selected for Stratford-on-Avon in June 2024.	Liberal Democrats
Mims Davies	Mid Sussex (Note: Previously served as the MP for Eastleigh from 2015 to 2019.)	2019	Conservative	East Grinstead and Uckfield	Selected for East Grinstead and Uckfield due to boundary changes in her former seat.	Conservative
Flick Drummond	Meon Valley	2019	Conservative	Winchester	Selected for Winchester in July 2023 as her previous seat was abolished. The reconfigured Winchester seat contains about 25% of the Meon Valley seat. Drummond sought selection for the proposed Fareham and Waterlooville seat, which contains a larger proportion of her former seat and is forecast to be much safer for the Conservatives than Winchester (a key Liberal Democrat target), but was defeated by Suella Braverman, the MP for Fareham and then–Home Secretary.	Liberal Democrats
Damien Egan	Kingswood	2024	Labour	Bristol North East	Selected for Bristol North East in July 2023. Elected in the 2024 Kingswood by-election triggered by the resignation of Chris Skidmore in January 2024; Kingswood was abolished in the general election, with Bristol North East absorbing the western third of the old seat.	Labour
Mary Glindon	North Tyneside	2010	Labour	Newcastle upon Tyne East and Wallsend	Selected for Newcastle upon Tyne East and Wallsend due to boundary changes in her previous seat.	Labour
Richard Holden	North West Durham	2019	Conservative	Basildon and Billericay	Chairman of the Conservative Party Holden's seat was abolished in the boundary changes. He was selected for Basildon and Billericay shortly before the close of nominations on 7 June.	Conservative
Paul Holmes	Eastleigh	2019	Conservative	Hamble Valley	Selected to the new Hamble Valley seat. The new seat contains 48% of his former seat.	Conservative
Neil Hudson	Penrith and The Border	2019	Conservative	Epping Forest	Sought selection for the new seat of Penrith and Solway, losing to fellow MP Mark Jenkinson; he subsequently applied for the West Suffolk seat, losing to former political adviser Nick Timothy Selected for Epping Forest.	Conservative
Eddie Hughes	Walsall North	2017	Conservative	Tamworth	Selected for Tamworth as his previous constituency was abolished, and the main successor seat of Walsall and Bloxwich was considered significantly more vulnerable to the Labour Party than Tamworth, where the incumbent MP Chris Pincher announced he would be standing down following a scandal. Pincher resigned in September 2023 and Labour's Sarah Edwards won the subsequent by-election; Hughes nevertheless since maintained his candidacy for this constituency.	Labour
Jeremy Hunt	South West Surrey	2005	Conservative	Godalming and Ash	Chancellor of the Exchequer Jeremy Hunt was selected for the newly created Godalming and Ash constituency in January 2023, as his former constituency was abolished. The western part of the existing seat, comprising the majority of the electorate and including the towns of Farnham and Haslemere was combined with parts of the District of East Hampshire to create the new Farnham and Bordon constituency. The Godalming and Ash seat comprises Godalming and the area of the North Downs to the south of the existing constituency.	Conservative
Sarah Jones	Croydon Central	2017	Labour	Croydon West	Standing for election in the new safe seat of Croydon West (containing 11% of the to-be-abolished Croydon Central) rather than the more marginal Croydon East (contains 83% of Croydon Central).	Labour
Kenny MacAskill	East Lothian	2019	Alba	Alloa and Grangemouth	The Alba Party candidate is former MP George Kerevan. MacAskill stands in a different seat to the west of Edinburgh.	Labour
Alison McGovern	Wirral South	2010	Labour	Birkenhead	Selected for Birkenhead due the abolition of her present constituency, defeating incumbent MP for Birkenhead Mick Whitley in the selection process. The reconfigured Birkenhead contains a small part of her present seat.	Labour
Kieran Mullan	Crewe and Nantwich	2019	Conservative	Bexhill and Battle	Selected for the seat defeating special adviser Henry Newman.	Conservative
Douglas Ross	Moray	2017	Conservative	Aberdeenshire North and Moray East	Standing in the new Aberdeenshire North and Moray East seat (containing 26% of his current seat) instead of Moray West, Nairn and Strathspey (containing 74% of his current seat).	SNP
Alec Shelbrooke	Elmet and Rothwell	2010	Conservative	Wetherby and Easingwold	Selected for Wetherby and Easingwold due to his previous seat being abolished and broken up between four other seats. Wetherby and Easingwold took in the Harewood and Wetherby wards of Leeds, but is otherwise based in North Yorkshire rather than West Yorkshire.	Conservative
Iain Stewart	Milton Keynes South	2010	Conservative	Buckingham and Bletchley	Selected for the new Buckingham and Bletchley seat, as his present seat was abolished.	Labour
Alistair Strathern	Mid Bedfordshire	2023	Labour	Hitchin	Elected for Mid Bedfordshire at a by-election in October 2023. Announced in January 2024 that he would contest the new constituency of Hitchin which includes a small part of his previous seat around his home town of Shefford.	Labour
Alison Thewliss	Glasgow Central	2015	SNP	Glasgow North	Selected for Glasgow North due to her former seat being abolished. This was after unsuccessfully challenging David Linden for the nomination in Glasgow East.	Labour

== Incumbent MPs standing against each other ==
In some cases, incumbent MPs are standing against each other.

Constituency	MP	Party	MP	Party	Note	Winner
Alloa and Grangemouth	Kenny MacAskill (East Lothian)	Alba	John Nicolson (Ochil and South Perthshire)	SNP	Both MPs were elected in the 2019 general election for the SNP; Nicolson previously served for East Dunbartonshire from 2015–2017.	Labour
Clwyd East	James Davies (Vale of Clwyd)	Conservative	Rob Roberts (Delyn)	Independent	Clwyd East contains large areas of both Davies and Roberts' existing seats. Both were elected in 2019 (Davies having previously served from 2015 to 2017). Roberts was suspended from the Conservatives in 2021 and had sat as an independent since.	Labour
Hitchin	Bim Afolami (Hitchin and Harpenden)	Conservative	Alistair Strathern (Mid Bedfordshire)	Labour	Strathern was elected in the 2023 Mid Bedfordshire by-election	Labour
Honiton and Sidmouth	Simon Jupp (East Devon)	Conservative	Richard Foord (Tiverton and Honiton)	Liberal Democrats	Foord was elected in the 2022 Tiverton and Honiton by-election	Liberal Democrats
North Shropshire	Simon Baynes (Clwyd South)	Conservative	Helen Morgan (North Shropshire)	Liberal Democrats	Morgan was elected in the 2021 North Shropshire by-election	Liberal Democrats
Tamworth	Eddie Hughes (Walsall North)	Conservative	Sarah Edwards (Tamworth)	Labour	Edwards was elected in the 2023 Tamworth by-election	Labour

Of these MPs, MacAskill, Baynes and Hughes represented seats with no relation to the seat they are contesting. All others listed represented at least part of the seat they also contest. All of the Labour and Liberal Democrat MPs listed were elected at by-elections held during the 2019–24 Parliament.

== Election polling ==
- Opinion polling for the 2024 United Kingdom general election
