= Brunswick Park (disambiguation) =

Brunswick Park is a neighbourhood and public park in the London Borough of Barnet.

Brunswick Park may also refer to:

- Brunswick Park (Barnet ward), electoral ward in the London Borough of Barnet
- Brunswick Park, Southwark, a public park located in Camberwell, in South East London
- Brunswick Park, Wednesbury, a public park in Wednesbury, in West Midlands, England
- Brunswick Park, Victoria, a public park in Victoria, Australia, which includes an oval formerly also known as Brunswick Park
