= Michael Crick =

English broadcaster, journalist and author (born 1958)

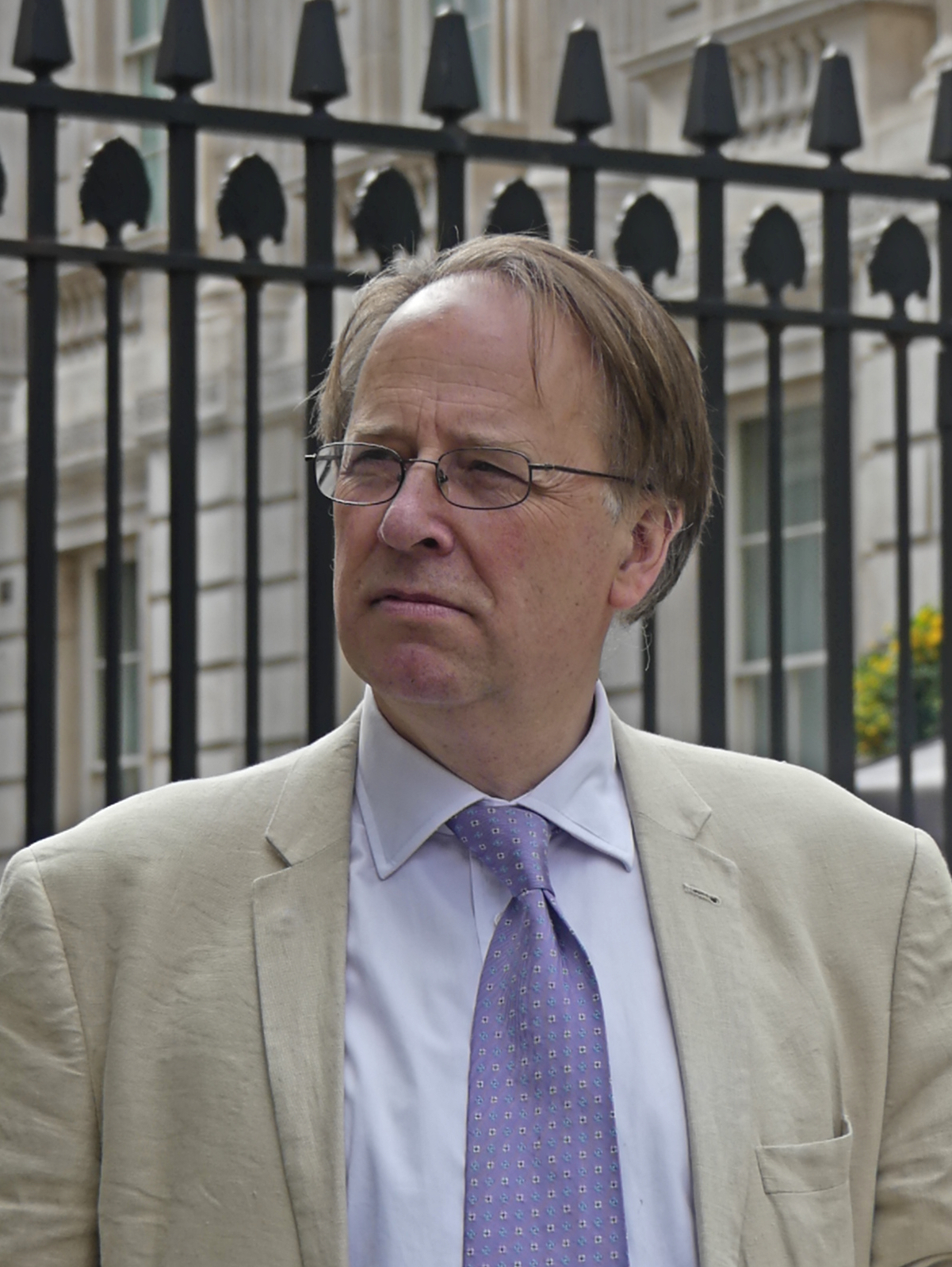
- Crick in 2018
- Born: Michael Lawrence Crick; 21 May 1958 (age 68); Northampton, England
- Education: Manchester Grammar School; New College, Oxford (BA)
- Occupations: broadcaster; journalist; author
- Employer(s): BBC (1990–2011); ITN (Channel 4 News) (1982–1990; 2011–2019)
- Spouse: Margaret Crick (m. 1985; div. 2008)
- Partner: Lucy Hetherington
- Children: 2

Michael Lawrence Crick (born 21 May 1958) is an English broadcaster, journalist and author. He was a founding member of the Channel 4 News team in 1982 and remained there until joining the BBC in 1990. He started work on the BBC's Newsnight programme in 1992, serving as political editor from 2007 until his departure from the BBC in 2011. Crick then returned to Channel 4 News as political correspondent. In 2014 he was chosen as Specialist Journalist of the Year at the Royal Television Society television journalism awards.

== Early life ==
Crick was born in Northampton, the eldest child of teachers John Crick and Patricia Wright, and brother to triplets Catherine, Anne and Beatrice. He was educated at the Manchester Grammar School (then a direct grant grammar school) and in 1975 was a member of the winning school team in the English Speaking Union Public Speaking Competition. Crick joined the Labour Party at the age of 15, and while revising for his A-levels, he worked as election agent for the party's candidate Gerard Collier (later Lord Monkswell).

Crick studied philosophy, politics and economics (PPE) at New College, Oxford, and graduated with a first class honours Bachelor of Arts (BA) degree. At Oxford, he was editor of the student newspaper, Cherwell; founded both the Oxford Handbook and the Oxbridge Careers Handbook; chaired the Democratic Labour Club; and was president of the Oxford Union in Michaelmas Term 1979, succeeding Theresa May's future husband Philip.

== Career ==
Crick started work at ITN as a trainee journalist in 1980. He was a founding member of the Channel 4 News team when the programme was launched in November 1982. During his period as their Washington correspondent (1988–1990) Crick won an award from the Royal Television Society for his coverage of the 1988 Presidential election between George H. W. Bush and Michael Dukakis.

Crick's first book, a study of the Militant tendency, ran to two editions, published by Faber in 1984 and 1986. Scargill and the Miners was published by Penguin in 1985.

In 1990, the Labour Party gave Crick the opportunity to contest the safe seat of Bootle, but he turned down the offer. He also served as chair of the Young Fabians from 1980 to 1981. He has described his own political views as "rightwing Labour".

=== Joins the BBC ===
Crick joined the BBC in 1990, initially appearing on Panorama, becoming a regular reporter on BBC Two's Newsnight in 1992. Jeffrey Archer: Stranger Than Fiction, his unauthorised biography of the novelist and former politician, appeared in its first edition during 1995.

Crick has investigated other politicians too, and has written unofficial biographies of several public figures. When Mark Mardell interviewed Archer for Newsnight in 1999 during his campaign to be elected mayor of London, Archer levelled, on camera, the following apparent threat at Crick: "You wait till I'm Mayor. You'll find out how tough I am." In 2002, Crick won an RTS Award for his Panorama programme "Jeffrey Archer: A Life of Lies" broadcast after Archer's conviction for perjury the previous July.

Following the Archer documentary, Crick began work on his biography of Sir Alex Ferguson which was published in 2002. Reporting "utterly misplaced" speculation that Crick would not be objective because of his lifelong support of Manchester United, Leo McKinstry wrote for The Daily Telegraph that Ferguson "has found a worthy, if hardly compliant, biographer".

=== 'Betsygate' and later stories ===
In 2003, under heavy pressure during the Hutton Inquiry, the BBC refused to show Crick's report for Newsnight into 'Betsygate'. These claims involved the alleged misuse of public funds by the private office of former Conservative Party leader Iain Duncan Smith and supposed payments to his wife Betsy for work she did not do. Crick had begun to investigate these claims in the Spring following a tip-off from a Conservative insider with knowledge of Duncan Smith's office. Crick referred the case to the Parliamentary Commissioner for Standards Sir Philip Mawer and the Duncan Smiths were largely cleared of any impropriety. Crick himself later said that he had been wrong to enter the "political arena" by referring the case to Mawer.

A biography, In Search of Michael Howard, was published just before the 2005 general election. Simon Heffer in The Spectator wrote that "it is thorough and well-researched, in some respects exceptionally so". In that year's election, it was observed that the five most terrifying words in the political lexicon were "Michael Crick is in reception".

Crick was appointed Newsnight's political editor in March 2007 in succession to Martha Kearney. "We're very lucky in the freedoms that we have on Newsnight to express ourselves as individuals. We are allowed to do our own thing", he said of the programme at the time. He broke the story in June 2008 concerning Caroline Spelman's misuse of her parliamentary staffing allowance which she was found to have used to pay her nanny.

=== Leaving Newsnight and after ===
In July 2011, it was announced that Crick was returning to Channel 4 News as political correspondent, replacing Cathy Newman under political editor Gary Gibbon. Crick made his last appearance on Newsnight on 29 July 2011. He was replaced by Allegra Stratton. The following September, he said in an interview for The Independent: "I was 19 years on Newsnight, and 18 of them were extremely happy and then towards the end, about a year ago, they made it clear to me that they wanted me to stop being the political editor and do another job, which was ill-defined." The journalist Nick Cohen, in appraising Newsnight and BBC practices shortly after the departure of Crick and other journalists, wrote that "Crick adheres instead to the honourable belief that the job of the reporter is to create as much trouble as possible. He lives by his creed by bringing in scoop after scoop."

Crick's revelation that the September 2012 'Plebgate' scandal was based on entirely fictitious evidence was the subject of a Dispatches programme in December 2012. The false accusations made against (then) Conservative chief whip Andrew Mitchell resulted in Mitchell resigning, and Crick found evidence of collusion by the Metropolitan Police.

In Summer 2013, Crick reported that a file on the Conservative politician Michael Mates had been sent to the Crown Prosecution Service concerning alleged offences committed during his candidacy in the Police and Crime Commissioner elections in 2012 for the post in Hampshire and the Isle of Wight.

Crick's investigations on behalf of Channel 4 into violations of electoral law in the South Thanet constituency during the 2017 general election resulted in the conviction of the Conservative Party regional organiser in 2019 of serious breaches of illegal spending. One consequence of his investigations has been a tightening of electoral law to prevent local candidates from using profiles of national figures in their literature. The costs of national figures supporting local candidates must be declared within local party expenditure accounts.

In April 2019, Crick announced he had retired from Channel 4 and ITN, stating that he was "looking forward to an exciting new life writing books again, and all sorts of other activity in journalism and other fields." He has since joined Mail Plus.

In June 2022, Crick launched a Twitter account called Tomorrow's MPs, documenting the election process of parties selecting candidates in the run-up to the 2024 general election. He concluded that "Labour's selection processes are unfair, and verging on corrupt". Since then Crick has documented several seats and raised issues about the way parties conduct their election process.

Crick regularly featured on Jacob Rees-Mogg's programme on GB News. In November 2023, he spoke to Neil Oliver on GB News in a segment on freedom of speech. During his appearance, he said that Ofcom should regulate the channel for being politically biased, saying: "I've been fighting bias in television for a very long time, and it's one of the reasons I left Channel 4 News 'cause I thought it was left-wing biased, and I think Ofcom, which is one of the weakest institutions on the planet, should get a grip on you lot. It's absurd that you have Tory MP, after Tory MP, after Tory MP, two leaders of the Brexit Party [as hosts], and hardly any Labour MPs – you are a right-wing channel and the rules in this country are very clear." Crick was subsequently removed from the programme and studio following his remarks, and later described GB News as a "right-wing propaganda channel".

== Personal life ==
Crick lives in Wandsworth, South London, with his partner Lucy Hetherington, an executive TV producer of documentaries and current affairs programmes. She is the daughter of former Guardian editor Alastair Hetherington. They have a daughter, Isabel, born in 2006.

He also has an older daughter, Catherine, born in 1987, from his former marriage to Margaret Crick, who was his wife from 1985 to 2008. Margaret was a former TV presenter who published a biography of Mary Archer in 2005.

A keen supporter of Manchester United, he has written several books on the team as well as his political works. In 1998–99 he was the organiser of the Shareholders United Against Murdoch campaign, which successfully opposed the proposed takeover of United by BSkyB. He later served as Vice-Chairman of Shareholders United. "The BBC weren't very pleased" at his involvement, he said in 2007.

Since 2012 Crick has been a lay member of the Board of Governors of the University of Manchester, and he also sits on the board of Manchester University Press.

== Books ==
- The March of Militant (Faber 1984, 1986, 2016).
- Scargill And The Miners (1985).
- Manchester United: The Betrayal of a Legend (with David Smith, 1989).
- Jeffrey Archer : Stranger Than Fiction (1995).
- Manchester United: The Complete Fact Book (1999).
- Michael Heseltine : A Biography (1997).
- The Boss: The Many Sides of Alex Ferguson (2002).
- In Search of Michael Howard (2005).
- Sultan of Swing: The Life of David Butler (2018).
- One Party After Another: The Disruptive Life of Nigel Farage (2022)

Media offices
Preceded by Martha Kearney	Political Editor: Newsnight; 2007–2011	Succeeded by Allegra Stratton
