= Quarterly Journal of Science =

Two journals in London

Quarterly Journal of Science was the title of two British scientific periodicals of the 19th century.

The first was established in 1816 by William Thomas Brande, as the Quarterly Journal of Science, Literature and the Arts. He edited it with John Millington and then Michael Faraday. To a large extent a vehicle for authors associated with the Royal Institution, it was taken over by the Institution in 1830, and then appeared as the Journal of the Royal Institution, to 1832.

In 1864, William Crookes started the Quarterly Journal of Science with James Samuelson. He edited it alone from 1870, and sold it in 1878, when the title was changed to Journal of Science, a monthly appearing to 1885.
