= Alison McGovern =

British politician (born 1980)

Alison McGovern MP
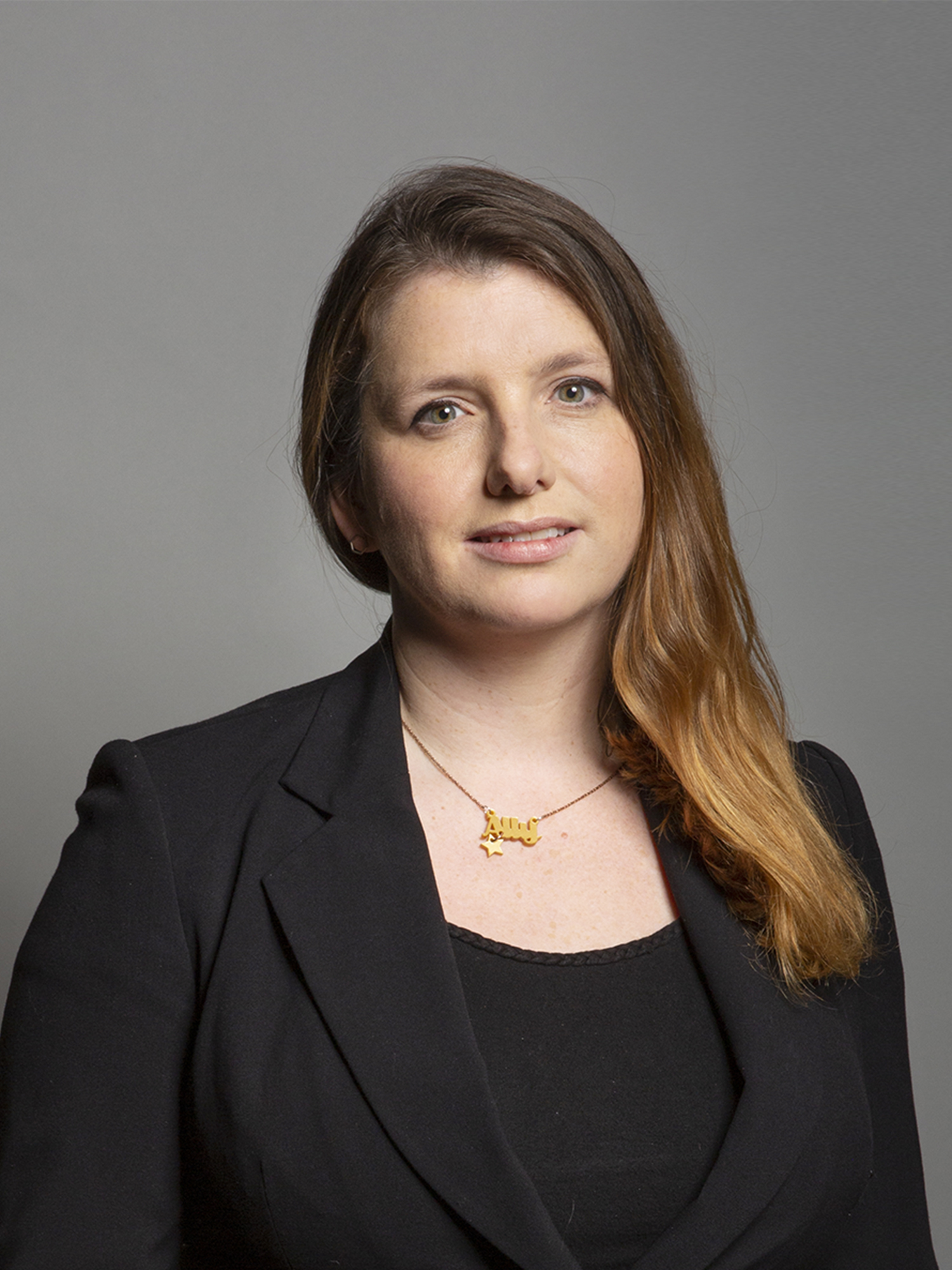
- Official portrait, 2019

Minister of State for Social Care
- Incumbent
- Assumed office 22 July 2026
- Prime Minister: Andy Burnham
- Preceded by: Stephen Kinnock

Minister of State for Local Government and Homelessness
- In office 6 September 2025 – 22 July 2026
- Prime Minister: Keir Starmer
- Preceded by: Jim McMahon
- Succeeded by: Jim McMahon (Local Government); Florence Eshalomi (Homelessness)

Minister of State for Employment
- In office 8 July 2024 – 6 September 2025
- Prime Minister: Keir Starmer
- Preceded by: Jo Churchill
- Succeeded by: Diana Johnson
Shadow portfolios
2021–2024	Employment
2020–2021	Cultural Industries and Sport
2015–2015	Economic Secretary
2014–2015	Children and Families
2013–2014	International Development
2013–2013	Whip
- Majority: 13,798 (32.0%)

Member of Parliament
- Incumbent
- Assumed office 4 July 2024
- Preceded by: Mick Whitley
- Constituency: Birkenhead
- In office 6 May 2010 – 30 May 2024
- Preceded by: Ben Chapman
- Succeeded by: Constituency abolished
- Constituency: Wirral South

Member of Southwark Council for Brunswick Park
- In office 4 May 2006 – 6 May 2010

Personal details
- Born: 30 December 1980 (age 45) Clatterbridge, Merseyside, England
- Party: Labour
- Spouse: Ashwin Kumar (m. 2008)
- Children: 1
- Education: University College London (BA)
- Website: https://www.alisonmcgovern.org.uk/

Alison McGovern (born 30 December 1980) is a British Labour politician who has served as Member of Parliament (MP) for Birkenhead since 2024, and previously Wirral South since 2010. She has served as Minister of State for Social Care since July 2026. She previously served as Minister of State for Employment from 2024 to 2025 and as Minister of State for Local Government and Homelessness from 2025 to 2026.

== Early life and career ==
Alison McGovern was born on 30 December 1980 in Clatterbridge, Wirral. She is the granddaughter of folksinger Peter McGovern, and is the daughter of a British Railways telecoms engineer father and a mother who was a nurse.

She was educated at Brookhurst Primary School, and then Wirral Grammar School for Girls. She received a Bachelor of Arts degree in philosophy from University College London.

After graduating from university, she worked as a researcher at the House of Commons, before handling communications for development projects at Network Rail, then working for the Art Fund and Creativity, Culture and Education.

McGovern was first elected as a councillor for Brunswick Park in the London Borough of Southwark in 2006, later becoming the Deputy Leader of the borough council's 29-member group of Labour councillors.

== Parliamentary career ==
=== 2010–2015 ===
At the 2010 general election, McGovern was elected to Parliament as MP for Wirral South with 40.8% of the vote and a majority of 531.

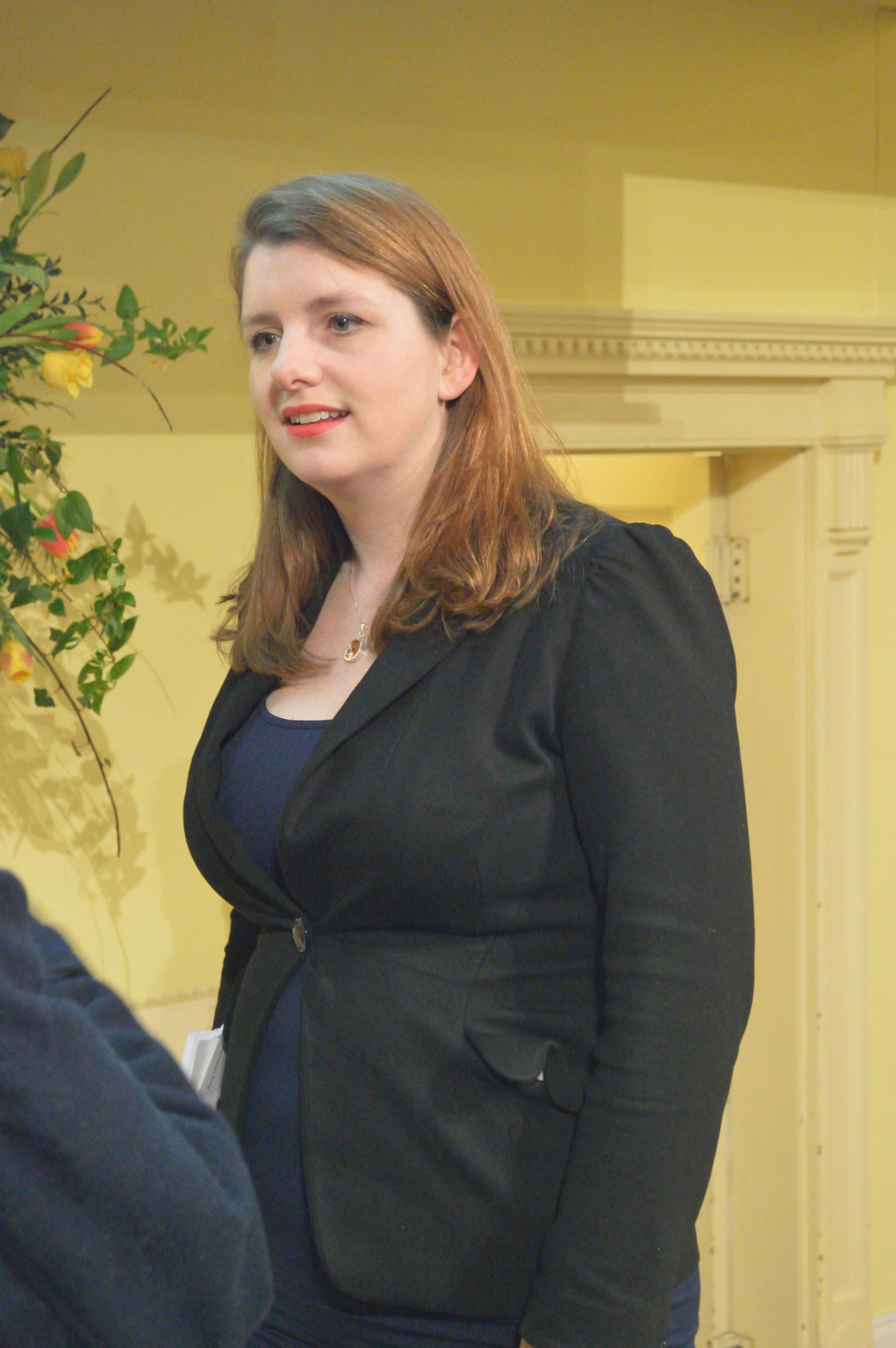
McGovern after a Radio 4's Any Questions? programme in 2016

McGovern made her maiden speech in the House of Commons on 3 June 2010 in a debate on European Affairs.

She became former Prime Minister Gordon Brown's parliamentary private secretary in July 2010.

In November 2010, She was selected by the PLP to become a member of the International Development Select Committee.

In March 2011, she visited India as part of an International Development Select Committee delegation.

In the 2013 Labour reshuffle, she was added to the Shadow International Development team. In 2014, she was moved to the shadow Children and Families portfolio.

=== 2015–2017 ===
At the 2015 general election, McGovern was re-elected as MP for Wirral South with an increased vote share of 48.2% and an increased majority of 4,599.

In May 2015, McGovern was appointed Shadow Economic Secretary to the Treasury in Labour's Treasury team. She departed the opposition front bench after Jeremy Corbyn was elected Labour leader in September 2015.

In October 2015, McGovern was appointed as Chair of Progress, a political organisation associated with the development of New Labour.

In January 2016, McGovern resigned from Labour's policy review on child poverty and combating inequality, as a protest against Progress being described by shadow Chancellor John McDonnell as having "a hard right agenda". She commented that she had been "backed into a corner". A Labour Party spokesperson stated "She is resigning from something that doesn't exist", as the initiative had not been confirmed or launched yet.

McGovern supported Owen Smith in the unsuccessful attempt to replace Jeremy Corbyn in the 2016 Labour Party (UK) leadership election.

McGovern served as chair of the Advisory Committee on Works of Art from July 2016 until April 2020, when she rejoined the opposition front bench. In September 2016, she was elected co-chair of the all-party parliamentary group Friends of Syria.

=== 2017–2019 ===
At the snap 2017 general election, McGovern was again re-elected with an increased vote share of 57.2% and an increased majority of 8,323.

=== 2019–2024 ===
She was again re-elected at the 2019 general election, with a decreased vote share of 51.2% and a decreased majority of 6,105.

In the 2020 Labour Party leadership election, McGovern supported Jess Phillips.

Due to the 2023 Periodic Review of Westminster constituencies, McGovern's constituency of Wirral South was abolished. She challenged Mick Whitley in Birkenhead for the Labour selection and was successful on 16 June 2023.

=== 2024–present ===
At the 2024 general election, McGovern was elected to Parliament as MP for Birkenhead with 52% of the vote and a majority of 13,798. She was appointed a Minister of State (Department for Work and Pensions) in the new Labour Government. McGovern described Job Centres as the "most unloved public service" and vowed to reform them. In September 2025, she moved to the Ministry of Housing, Communities and Local Government with the portfolio of Local Government and Homelessness.

On 22 July 2026, new Prime Minister Andy Burnham appointed McGovern as Minister of State for Social Care.

== Views ==
McGovern is seen to be on the political right of the Labour Party and chairs Progressive Britain (formerly Progress), a group founded in 1996 to support Tony Blair.

McGovern is a member of the Fabian Society, and a supporter of Labour Friends of Israel.

== Personal life ==
In 2008 McGovern married economist Ashwin Kumar, formerly a senior civil servant in the Department for Work and Pensions and Passenger Director at Passenger Focus. The couple have a daughter, born in 2011.

Parliament of the United Kingdom
Preceded by Ben Chapman	Member of Parliament for Wirral South; 2010–2024	Constituency abolished
Preceded by Mick Whitley	Member of Parliament for Birkenhead; 2024–present	Incumbent
