= James Samuelson =

British industrialist, magazine founder, editor, barrister and author

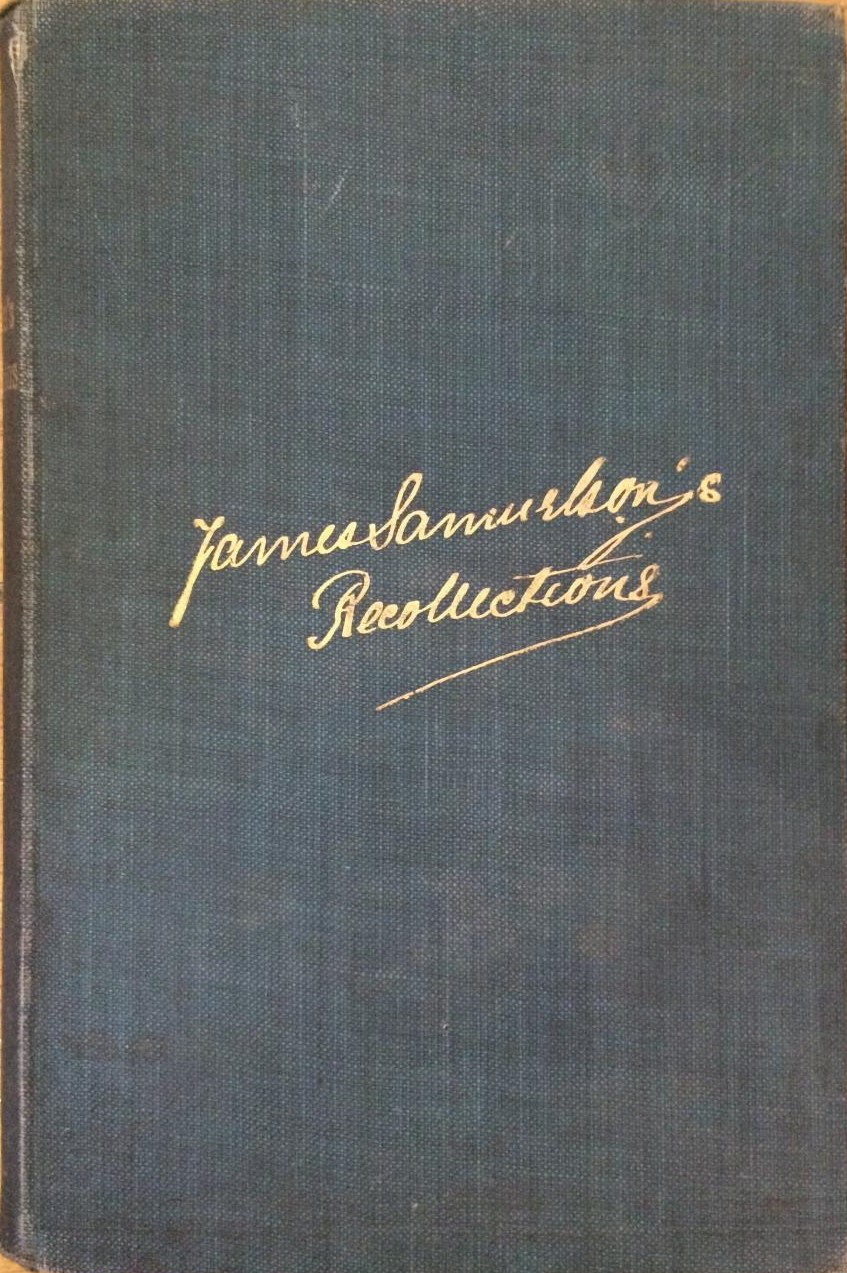
- Cover of James Samuelson's Recollections, 1907.
- Born: April 1829; Liverpool
- Died: 14 April 1918 (aged 88–89)
- Occupations: Magazine founder and editor/author

James Samuelson (April 1829-14 April 1918) was a Liverpool industrialist, magazine founder and editor, barrister of the Middle Temple and prolific British non-fiction author known for his works on the history of the Balkans and on social and philosophical topics.

== Early life and family ==
James Samuelson was born in Liverpool in 1829 to Samuel and Sarah Samuelson. His older brother, Bernhard Samuelson, became a Member of Parliament.

== Career ==
Samuelson's early career was as a science teacher and writer on microscopy about which he published several books in 1860. In 1861 he founded the quarterly Popular Science Review which he sold to the medical writer Henry Lawson in 1864. He then immediately co-founded and edited with William Crookes the more academic Quarterly Journal of Science which was innovative in breaking with the tradition of anonymous content of similar journals. This he sold to Crookes in 1870.

Around this time, he decided to study law and become a barrister at the Middle Temple. He became increasingly involved with social and political topics and wrote books on The German Working Man (1869) and Work, Wages, and the Profits of Capital (1872), and continued to produce works on labour and social topics such as temperance for the rest of his life. In 1869, he was the president of the Liverpool Operative Trades Hall. In 1882, he was living at Claughton, Birkenhead.

Samuelson stood three times for Parliament, as a Liberal-Labour candidate: in Birkenhead at the 1874 general election, in Liverpool Kirkdale at the 1885 general election, and in East Renfrewshire at the 1886 general election, taking third place on each occasion.

Samuelson also ran a seed crushing business, and in the mid-1890s he started a profit sharing scheme with his employees. In 1890, he launched Subjects of the Day, which included commentary on current affairs and whose contributors included William Gladstone, but it was closed by the publishers after only four issues.

== Death and legacy ==
Samuelson died in 1918. In 2018 it was discovered that Bram Stoker, author of Dracula (1897), had consulted a copy of Samuelson's Roumania Past and Present (1882) in the London Library as research when writing his book.

== Selected publications ==
=== 1860s ===
- The Honey-bee: its natural history, habits, anatomy, and microscopical beauties. Van Voost, 1860. (with Branton Hicks J.)
- Humble Creatures. The earth worm and the common house fly. In eight letters by J. Samuelson, assisted by J. B. Hicks. London, 1860.
- (Humble Creatures: Pt. 2.) The Honey-Bee; its natural history, habits, anatomy, and microscopical beauties. With tinted illustrations. By J. Samuelson, assisted by J. B. Hicks. Also two chapters on Instinct and Reason; being an introduction to the study of Comparative Psychology, by the same author. London, 1860.
- Continuity in Civilisation, as illustrated by the connection between our own culture and that of the ancient world. An essay read before the Liverpool Literary and Philosophical Society. London, 1869.
- The German Working Man, his institutions for selfculture, and his unions for material progress. London, 1869.

=== 1870s ===
- Views of the Deity, traditional and scientific: a contribution to the study of theological science &c. London, 1871.
- Work, Wages, and the Profits of Capital: an essay on the Labour Question. London, 1872.
- The Natural Foundation of Religion. London, 1876.
- The History of Drink. A review, social, scientific, and political. 1878. (2nd edition 1880)
- Useful information for intending Emigrants to the Western Prairies of the United States, etc. George Philip & Son, London, 1879.

=== 1880s ===
- National Reform Union. W. E. Gladstone, scholar, statesman, orator and financial reformer. An address ... to the Liberals of Preston, etc. H. J. Infield, London, [1880].
- Roumania Past and Present. Longmans & Co., London, 1882.
- A Digest of the Corrupt Practices Act [46 and 47 Vic. c. 51], its aims and chief provisions. Philip & Son, London, [1883].
- Shall Russian treachery win the day? An appeal to Englishmen. With a diagram showing the advance of Russia upon Constantinople. Trübner & Co., London, 1886.
- Bulgaria Past and Present; Historical, Political, and Descriptive. Trübner, London, 1888.

=== 1890s ===
- India past and present historical, social and political. Trübner & Co., London, 1890. [1889]
- Boards of Conciliation and Arbitration for the settlement of labour disputes. Kegan Paul & Co., London, 1891.
- Boards of Conciliation in Labour Disputes ... A short address to the artizans and labourers of Liverpool, etc. Rockliff Bros., Liverpool, 1892.
- Labour-Saving Machinery : An Essay on the effect of Mechanical Appliances in the Displacement of Manual Labour in various Industries. Kegan Paul, London, 1893.
- Greece; her present condition and recent progress &c. Sampson Low & Co., London, 1894.
- The Civilisation of our Day. A series of original essays on some of its more important phases at the close of the nineteenth century. By expert writers. S. Low & Co., London, 1896. (editor)
- Footsteps in Human Progress, secular and religious. A short series of letters to a friend. Swan Sonnenschein & Co., London, 1898.

=== 1900s ===
- Drink and Compensation. An essay on licensing reform. George Routledge & Sons, London, 1903.
- James Samuelson's Recollections: being some experiences and reflections mainly on subjects of the day, etc. Simpkin, Marshall & Co., London, [1907].
- The Lament of the Sweated. P. S. King & Son, London, 1908.
- The Human Race; its past, present and probable future. An essay. Swan Sonnenschein & Co., London, 1910. [1909]

=== 1910s ===
- The Children of our Slums: Their Sufferings, Protection, Rescue, Training & Afterlife. To which is added the "Children Act, 1908". Liverpool Booksellers' Co., Liverpool, and Simpkin, Marshall & Co., London. [1911]
- Drink, Past, Present, & Probable Future, With Some of its Bearings on the War. An essay. Philip, Son & Nephew, Liverpool, & Day & Bath, Sidmouth. [1916]
