= 2024 United Kingdom general election betting scandal =

United Kingdom political scandal

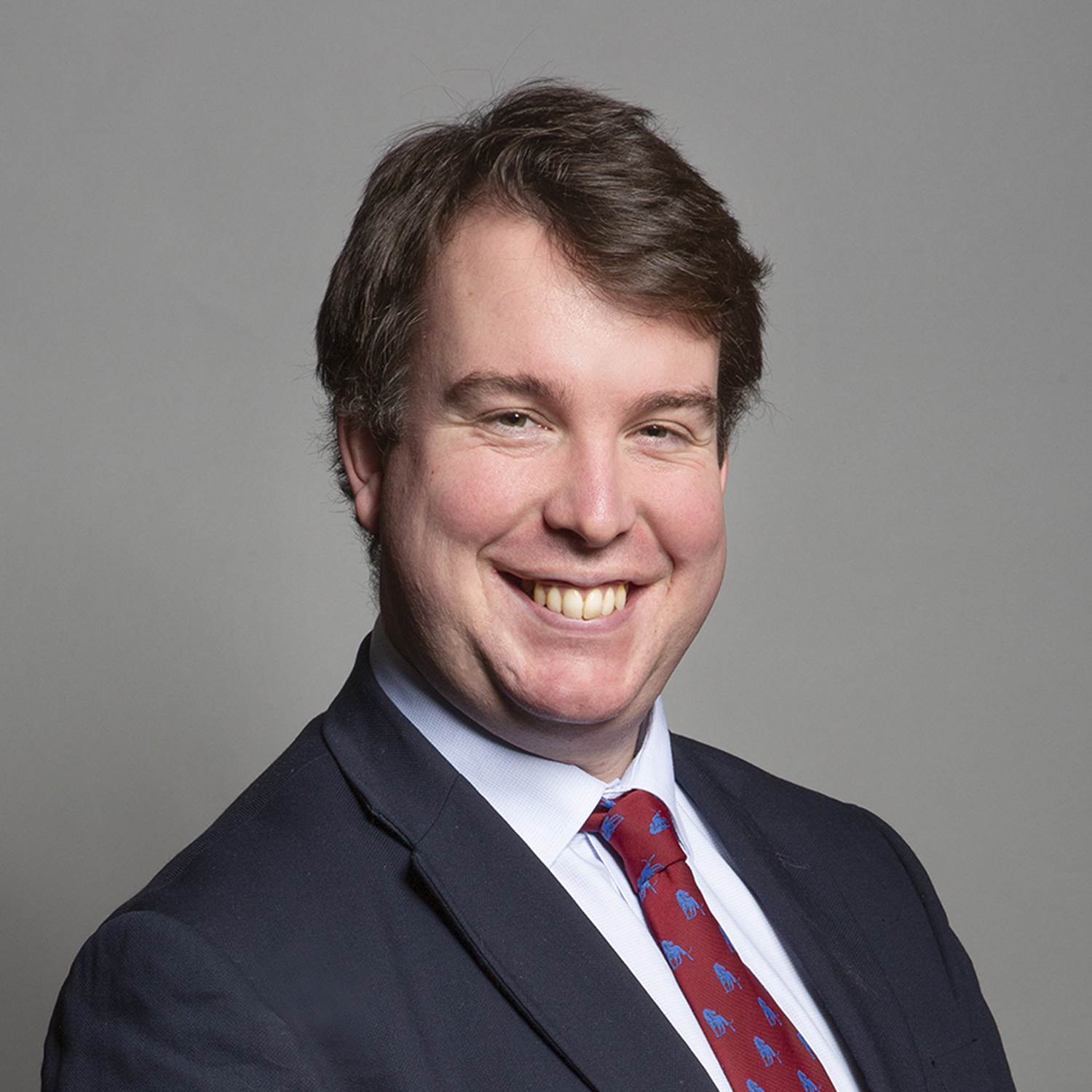
Craig Williams, whose £100 bet on the election date began the scandal

During the 2024 general election campaign, allegations were made that illicit bets were placed by political party members and police officers, some of whom may have had insider knowledge of the date of the general election before Rishi Sunak, the Prime Minister at the time, publicly announced when it would be held.

The allegations started with a report in The Guardian saying that Conservative candidate and Parliamentary Private Secretary to the Prime Minister, Craig Williams, had placed a £100 bet on 19 May 2024 that the election would be in July, three days before Sunak announced the general election to the public. In response, the Gambling Commission opened an inquiry into alleged betting offences relating to the day of the election. Later, further allegations, or admissions of political betting, were made involving police officers, Conservative members, a Labour member, and a Liberal Democrat member.

== Background ==
On 12 June 2024, The Guardian reported that a Conservative candidate in the election and Parliamentary Private Secretary to the Prime Minister, Craig Williams, had put a £100 bet on a July election with Ladbrokes in a branch in his constituency of Montgomeryshire on 19 May, three days before Rishi Sunak announced the election to the public on the 22nd. He apologised for the bet, calling it "a huge error of judgment"; both Williams and Sunak declined to answer when asked if Williams had inside information.

== Inquiry ==
In response to the initial report on Craig Williams's bet, the Gambling Commission opened an inquiry into alleged betting offences relating to the day of the election.

The Metropolitan Police was contacted by the Gambling Commission on 14 June 2024 concerning this inquiry, informing it that it was investigating alleged bets that were made by a police constable from the force's Royalty and Specialist Protection Command. The officer was initially suspended, then on 17 June arrested on suspicion of misconduct in public office, taken into custody and bailed pending further inquiries.

On 19 June, BBC News reported that the Conservative Party's director of campaigning, Tony Lee, is being investigated by the Gambling Commission over an alleged bet related to the date of the election. Lee's wife, Laura Saunders, the Conservative candidate for Bristol North West, is also being investigated in relation to bets on the date of the election.

On 22 June, The Sunday Times reported that the Conservative Party's chief data officer, Nick Mason, had allegedly placed 'dozens' of bets over an unspecified period, which would have amounted to thousands of pounds of winnings.

On 23 June, Chris Mason, of the BBC, was told that more unnamed people linked to the Conservative Party were being investigated by the Gambling Commission. On 24 June Sunak said that he was "not aware of any other" Conservative candidates being investigated by the Gambling Commission. The Times reported that the investigation was being widened to 100s of suspicious bets.

According to The Telegraph, a source close to the Cabinet Office believed the "leaks" of who was being investigated originated with the Metropolitan Police. The Met denied this.

On 25 June, The Telegraph reported that the Gambling Commission is also investigating five other police officers in relation to allegations of placing bets on the election date. The Met subsequently confirmed that the Gambling Commission is investigating the officers. Later, on 27 June, the Met said that the number of police officers under investigation had risen to "at least seven".

Subsequently, Alister Jack, the Secretary of State for Scotland, who had previously claimed to have won £2,100 by betting on the date of the election, then dismissed the comment as a joke and issued a statement in which he said he had not in fact placed any bet on the election. He did later admit to placing bets on the date of the election but denied doing anything wrong. In addition, the Conservative Party suspended Craig Williams and Laura Saunders as candidates "as a result of ongoing internal inquiries".

Later that same day, Labour suspended Kevin Craig, their candidate for Central Suffolk and North Ipswich, after the Gambling Commission launched an unrelated investigation into him for placing a bet on himself losing in his constituency.

On 26 June, The Sun reported that Sir Philip Davies, the Conservative candidate for Shipley allegedly placed an £8,000 bet on whether he would lose his seat at the election, which has a majority of 6,242.

On 28 June, it was reported that Sunak's Chief of Staff, Liam Booth-Smith, was being interviewed by the Gambling Commission in relation to bets placed on the date of the election, in order to provide information as to who may have known when the date of the election would be.

In August 2024, the Metropolitan Police announced that they would not charge any of the political figures involved in the scandal for misconduct in public office. In a statement, the Met said that people involved could still be charged under the Gambling Act.

=== Devolved politics ===
On 25 June, The Guardian reported that Russell George, the Conservative Senedd member for Montgomeryshire, was reported to have been informed by the Gambling Commission inquiry that he was being investigated after he had allegedly bet on the date of the election. He also stepped back from the Welsh Shadow Cabinet.

On 26 June, Alex Cole-Hamilton, the leader of the Scottish Liberal Democrats, admitted he placed bets on Scottish Liberal Democrat election candidates, but said he did not place bets on the date of the election itself.

=== People suspected to be involved in the scandal ===
As of August 2024, people suspected to be involved in the scandal included former Conservative MPs Craig Williams, Alister Jack, and Philip Davies as well as Conservative director of campaigning Tony Lee, his wife Laura Saunders, Conservative chief data officer Nick Mason, Rishi Sunak's former chief of staff Liam Booth-Smith, Conservative Senedd member Russell George, and seven unnamed officers of the Metropolitan Police as well as a member of Sunak's security team.

== Charges ==
In April 2025, the Gambling Commission charged 15 people with offences under Section 42 of the Gambling Act 2005, including Russell George, Tony Lee, Nick Mason, Laura Saunders, and Craig Williams. Trials are not expected to begin until September 2027 or January 2028.

== Reaction ==
Foreign Secretary David Cameron condemned Williams for making the bet, saying it was a "very foolish decision". Levelling Up Secretary Michael Gove, who stood down as an MP at the election, thought that the scandal was as damaging as Partygate for the Conservative Party. Labour leader and Leader of the Opposition Keir Starmer criticised Sunak over the controversy, accused him of being bullied into action and joked: "I only bet on the horses". Sunak said on 20 June that he was "incredibly angry to learn of these allegations" and that "it's right that they're being investigated properly by the relevant law enforcement authorities".

Sunak and the Conservative Party faced criticism from Labour and Liberal Democrat leaders Starmer and Davey after the scandal came to light. Davey, whilst admitting that he had bet on the outcome of elections, also called for a review of gambling laws.
