= Mick Whitley =

British politician

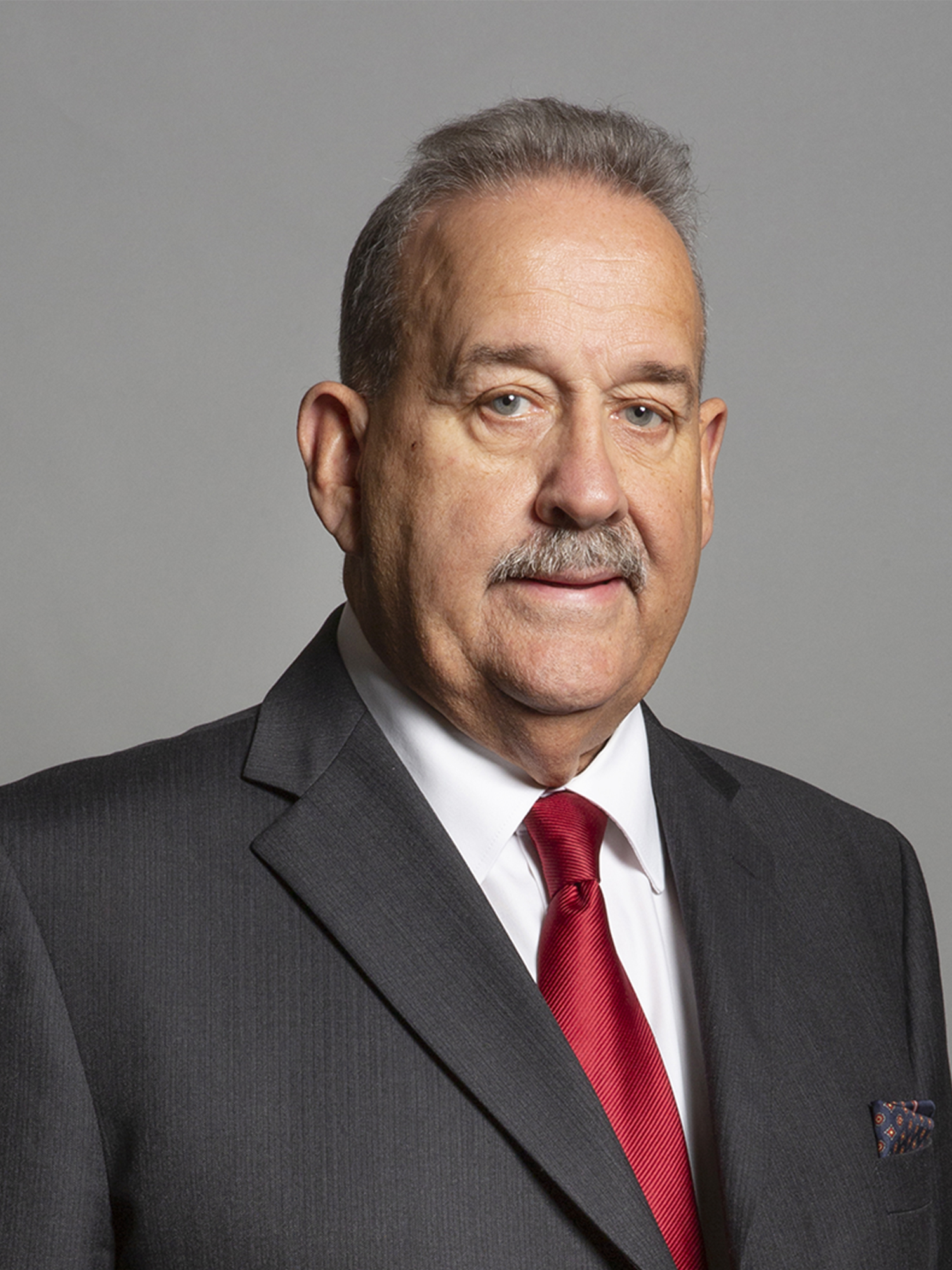
- Official portrait, 2019

Member of Parliament for Birkenhead
- In office 12 December 2019 – 30 May 2024
- Preceded by: Frank Field
- Succeeded by: Alison McGovern

Personal details
- Born: Michael Whitley; 17 November 1951 (age 74) Birkenhead, Cheshire, England
- Party: Labour
- Other political affiliations: Socialist Campaign Group
- Website: Archived campaign website

Michael Whitley (born 17 November 1951) is a British Labour Party politician and trade unionist who served as Member of Parliament (MP) for Birkenhead from 2019 to 2024.

== Early life and career ==
Michael Whitley was born on 17 November 1951 in St Catherine's Hospital, Birkenhead. He grew up in Woodchurch, and his father and brothers worked in the shipbuilding industry.

After serving in the Merchant Navy, Whitley worked for Vauxhall Motors and became a trade union organiser. He was later a regional secretary for the trade union Unite.

== Parliamentary career ==
Whitley was elected as the Labour MP for Birkenhead at the 2019 general election with 59% of the vote and a majority of 17,705.

In July 2021, during the 2021 Israel-Palestine Crisis, Whitley signed a letter along with 19 other MPs calling for sanctions on Israel "for its repeated violations of international law".

On 14 December 2021, Whitley resigned from his role as parliamentary private secretary to Ed Miliband in order to defy the whip by voting against mandatory COVID-19 vaccination for NHS staff. He also voted in line with the party whip by voting in favour of COVID-19 vaccine passports and an expansion of mask mandates.

On 24 February 2022, following the 2022 Russian invasion of Ukraine, Whitley was one of 11 Labour MPs threatened with losing the party whip after they signed a statement by the Stop the War Coalition which questioned the legitimacy of NATO and accused the military alliance of "eastward expansion". All 11 MPs subsequently removed their signatures.

The 2023 review of Westminster constituencies, which reduced the number of constituencies located on the Wirral peninsula, led to Whitley being challenged by Wirral South MP Alison McGovern for the Labour candidacy for Birkenhead for the 2024 general election. He was deselected on 16 June 2023.

Parliament of the United Kingdom
Preceded by Frank Field	Member of Parliament for Birkenhead; 2019–2024	Succeeded by Alison McGovern
