= Birkenhead (constituency) =

Parliamentary constituency in the United Kingdom, 1950 onwards

- Borough constituency for the House of Commons
- Interactive map of boundaries since 2024
- Location within North West England
- County: 1861–1918 Cheshire 1950–1974 Cheshire 1974– Merseyside
- Population: 88,818 (2011 census)
- Electorate: 76,271 (March 2020)
- Major settlements: Birkenhead

Current constituency
- Created: 1950
- Member of Parliament: Alison McGovern (Labour)
- Seats: One
- Created from: Birkenhead East, Birkenhead West, Wirral South

1861–1918
- Type of constituency: Borough constituency
- Created from: South Cheshire
- Replaced by: Birkenhead East, Birkenhead West

Birkenhead (/ˌbɜːrkənˈhɛd/) is a constituency in Merseyside represented in the House of Commons of the UK Parliament since 2024 by Alison McGovern of the Labour Party. (Note: As with all constituencies, the constituency elects one Member of Parliament (MP) by the first past the post system of election at least every five years.) McGovern was MP for the abolished constituency of Wirral South from 2010 to 2024.

== Profile ==
The constituency of Birkenhead covers the town of Birkenhead, on the Wirral Peninsula, and the Birkenhead suburbs of Bidston, Claughton, Oxton, Prenton, Rock Ferry and Tranmere. It forms the relatively densely populated mid-east of four parliamentary constituencies within the Metropolitan Borough of Wirral, itself a major contributor to (and the ex-Cheshire part of) the Metropolitan County of Merseyside envisaged in 1958 and created in 1974, considered as any other county (albeit with very limited powers and no elected councillors) for the enacted purposes of the Boundary Commission in its periodic reports.

The urban parts of the town unite with Liverpool on the opposite side of the narrows of the estuary in having an early socially reformist movement in local measures, and its choice of many elected representatives since the 1850s. The work was evidenced in the building of large public buildings and institutions and the creation of supported workers' housing, creating Port Sunlight to the south, among other such estates. The southern border of the borough controversially avoids the near-circular suburbs of the cathedral city of Chester, thereby creating a jagged boundary in local and national government; nonetheless, the Wirral has scenic shores and large golf courses including to the west one which regularly hosts The Open. Transcending the dense 20th-century urban-semi-rural divide of Merseyside is the largely Victorian era-built town of Birkenhead, at the centre of which lies the archetype of city parks, Birkenhead Park, a social gift and early publicly subscribed community asset in the area.

The seat is almost square and bounded by its sole motorway to the west. Its homes were (at the 2011 UK Census) 53% owner-occupied compared to 60% in the region. The seat's entirely left-wing victories nationally since 1945 evidence commitment locally to public services and wealth redistribution, rather than laissez-faire economics and low taxation. The 2015 general election result made the seat the fifteenth-safest of Labour's 232 seats by percentage of majority.

== History ==
Birkenhead was enfranchised in 1861 by the Appropriation of Seats (Sudbury and Saint Albans) Act 1861 as a single-member parliamentary borough. It was first contested at a by-election on 11 December 1861 and continued as a single-seat constituency until it was split between Birkenhead East and Birkenhead West under the terms of the Representation of the People Act 1918 which took effect for the 1918 general election.

Under the Representation of the People Act 1948, coming into effect at the 1950 general election, the constituency was re-established with revised boundaries.

== Boundaries ==
=== Historic ===
1861–1918: The enfranchising Act provided that the constituency was to consist of the Extra-parochial Chapelry of Birkenhead, the several townships of Claughton, Tranmere, and Oxton, and so much of the township of Higher Bebington as lies to the eastward of the road leading from Higher Tranmere to Lower Bebington.

The boundaries were not altered by the Boundaries Act 1868 or the Redistribution of Seats Act 1885.

1950–1974: The County Borough of Birkenhead, except the wards included in the Bebington constituency (i.e. the wards of Bebington, Devonshire, Egerton, Mersey, and Prenton).

Comprised the majority of the expanded County Borough, incorporating Birkenhead West, parts of Birkenhead East and parts transferred from Wirral.

1974–1983: The County Borough of Birkenhead wards of Argyle, Bebington, Cathcart, Claughton, Cleveland, Clifton, Devonshire, Egerton, Gilbrook, Grange, Holt, Mersey, Oxton, and St James.

Gained the Bebington, Devonshire, Egerton and Mersey wards from the abolished constituency of Bebington. Upton ward transferred to Wirral.

From 1 April 1974 until the next boundary review came into effect for the 1983 general election, the constituency comprised parts of the Metropolitan Borough of Wirral in Merseyside but its boundaries were unchanged.

1983–2010: The Metropolitan Borough of Wirral wards of Bidston, Birkenhead, Claughton, Egerton, Oxton, and Tranmere.

Boundaries broadly unchanged.

2010–2024: The Metropolitan Borough of Wirral wards of Bidston and St James, Birkenhead and Tranmere, Claughton, Oxton, Prenton, and Rock Ferry.

Boundaries changed to reflect new ward boundaries. Prenton transferred from Wirral West.

=== Current ===
Further to the 2023 review of Westminster constituencies, which came into effect for the 2024 general election, the constituency was expanded to bring the electorate within the permitted range by transferring the Metropolitan Borough of Wirral ward of Bebington (as it existed on 1 December 2020) from the abolished constituency of Wirral South.

== Political history ==
=== 1865–1918 ===
The seat's elections were won by Conservatives with one exception, the 1906 landslide victory for the Liberal Party.

=== 1918–1950 (seats split) ===
The two seats alternated frequently between the three largest parties in the 1920s, before the 1931 and 1935 general elections, which saw a major Conservative and Unionist Party victory (standing as Unionist in this area) in Birkenhead West, the latter election heralding a ten-year Parliament. However, the Liberal Graham White, of the more radical faction, won the eastern seat at both elections, echoing his victory in 1922. Having had predominantly marginal majorities, the seats were firmly won by the Labour Party in their nationwide landslide victory of 1945.

=== Since 1950 re-creation ===
Since 1950, Birkenhead has returned Labour MPs with large and generally increasing majorities — apart from a 7% majority in 1955.

Frank Field, who represented the constituency from 1979 to 2019, was appointed as Welfare Reform Minister in the First Blair ministry in 1997 but served for just for one year. He chaired the Work and Pensions Select Committee from 2015 to 2019. In the 2017 general election he received 77% of the vote, achieving a majority of 58%. However, he resigned from the Labour whip in August 2018, citing anti-semitism in the party. In the 2019 general election he stood as a candidate of the Birkenhead Social Justice Party but he lost easily to the Labour Party candidate, Mick Whitley, gaining only 17% of the vote.

Following boundary changes, Whitley was challenged and defeated by Alison McGovern, the MP for Wirral South (to be abolished), for the Labour selection for Birkenhead at the upcoming general election. He was deselected on 16 June 2023. McGovern was duly elected as the new Labour MP at the 2024 election.

=== Minor party candidates ===
Two Communist candidates, including Barry Williams, stood between 1950 and 1970, obtaining a high point of 1.5% of the votes cast.

More recently, at the 2001, 2005 and 2010 general elections no candidates apart from those selected by the Labour, Conservative, and Liberal Democrat parties contested the seat. The 2015 general election result saw the Liberal Democrat candidate fall behind the Green candidate, with both parties narrowly losing their deposits, as they did in 2017 and 2019. The Brexit Party stood at the 2019 general election, also losing its deposit.

In 2024, the Green candidate increased its vote from 3.3% to 20.1% and Reform UK (formerly the Brexit Party) from 3% to 14%, coming second and third respectively. This relegated the Conservatives to fourth and the Liberal Democrats to fifth, although both retained their deposits.

== Members of Parliament ==
=== MPs 1861–1918 ===
Election	Member	Party
1861	John Laird	Conservative
1874	David MacIver	Conservative
1885	Edward Bruce Hamley	Conservative
1892	Arnold Keppel, Viscount Bury	Conservative
1894	Elliott Lees	Conservative
1906	Henry Vivian	Lib-Lab
1910	Alfred Bigland	Conservative
1918	constituency abolished: see Birkenhead East and Birkenhead West	

=== MPs since 1950 ===
Election	Member	Party
1950	Percy Collick	Labour
1964	Edmund Dell	Labour
1979	Frank Field	Labour
2018	Frank Field	Independent
2019	Mick Whitley	Labour
2024	Alison McGovern	Labour

== Elections ==
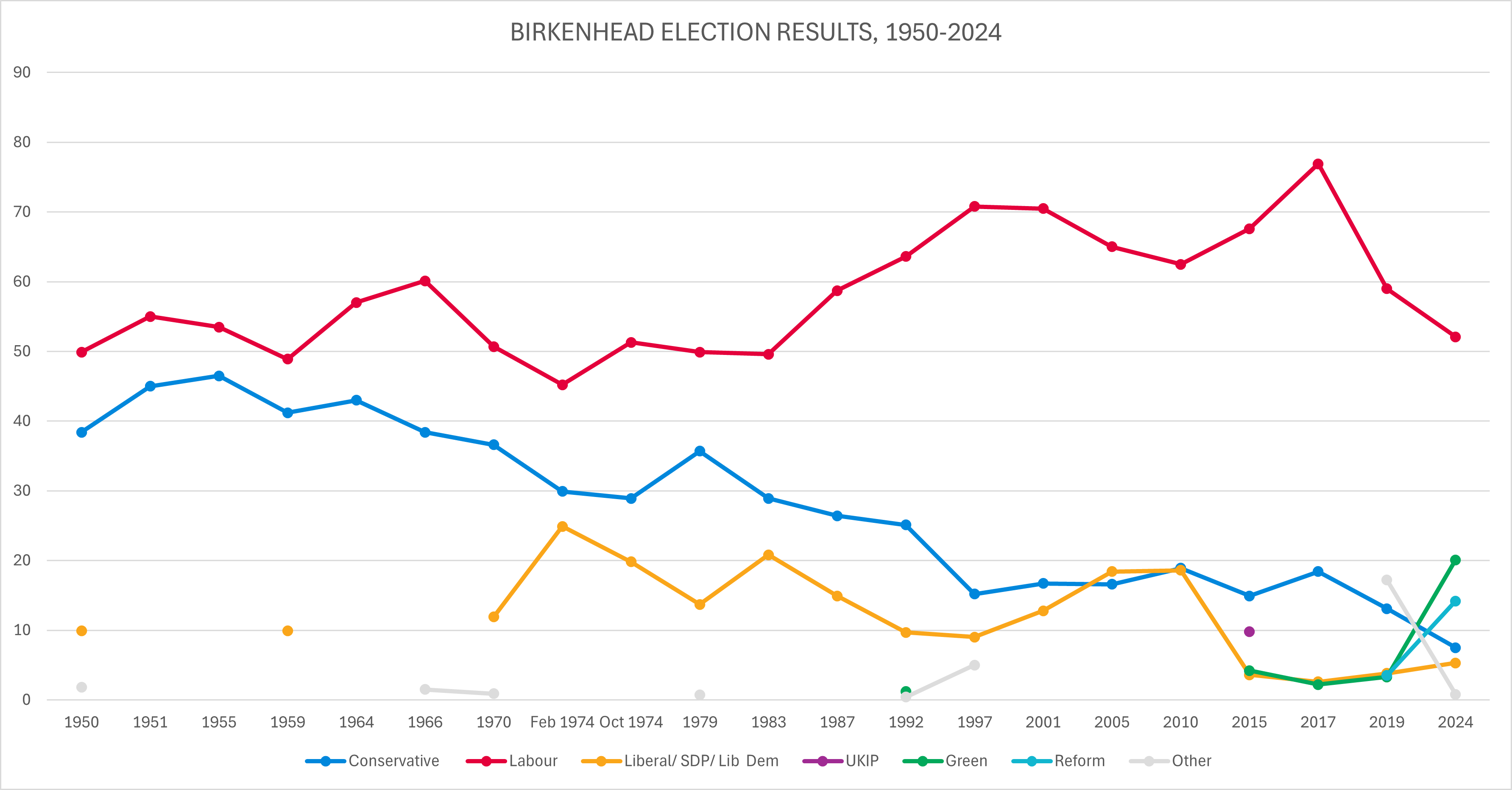
Election results 1950–2024

=== Elections in the 2020s ===
General election 2024: Birkenhead
Party	Candidate	Votes	%	±%
Labour	Alison McGovern	22,468	52.1	−7.9
Green	Jo Bird	8,670	20.1	+17.1
Reform	Tony Stanley	6,142	14.2	+10.8
Conservative	Sarah Payne	3,238	7.5	−8.1
Liberal Democrats	Stuart Kelly	2,292	5.3	+1.3
Freedom Alliance	Catherine Evans	324	0.8	N/A
Rejected ballots		142		
Majority		13,798	32.0	−12.4
Turnout		43,134	55.2	−12.7
Registered electors		78,091		
Labour hold		Swing	−12.5	

Changes are from the notional 2019 results on the 2024 boundaries.

=== Elections in the 2010s ===
2019 notional result
Party	Vote	%
Labour	31,056	60.0
Conservative	8,063	15.6
Others	7,285	14.1
Liberal Democrats	2,062	4.0
Brexit Party	1,744	3.4
Green	1,552	3.0
Turnout	51,762	67.9
Electorate	76,271	

General election 2019: Birkenhead
Party	Candidate	Votes	%	±%
Labour	Mick Whitley	24,990	59.0	−17.9
Birkenhead Social Justice	Frank Field	7,285	17.2	N/A
Conservative	Claire Rowles	5,540	13.1	−5.3
Liberal Democrats	Stuart Kelly	1,620	3.8	+1.2
Brexit Party	Darren Lythgoe	1,489	3.5	N/A
Green	Pat Cleary	1,405	3.3	+1.1
Majority		17,705	41.8	−16.7
Turnout		42,329	66.4	−1.3
Labour hold		Swing		

General election 2017: Birkenhead
Party	Candidate	Votes	%	±%
Labour	Frank Field	33,558	76.9	+9.3
Conservative	Stewart Gardiner	8,044	18.4	+3.5
Liberal Democrats	Allan Brame	1,118	2.6	−1.0
Green	Jayne Clough	943	2.2	−2.0
Majority		25,514	58.5	+5.8
Turnout		43,663	67.7	+5.0
Labour hold		Swing	+2.8	

General election 2015: Birkenhead
Party	Candidate	Votes	%	±%
Labour	Frank Field	26,468	67.6	+5.1
Conservative	Clark Vasey	5,816	14.9	−4.0
UKIP	Wayne Harling	3,838	9.8	N/A
Green	Kenny Peers	1,626	4.2	N/A
Liberal Democrats	Allan Brame	1,396	3.6	−15.0
Majority		20,652	52.7	+9.1
Turnout		39,144	62.7	+5.1
Labour hold		Swing		

General election 2010: Birkenhead
Party	Candidate	Votes	%	±%
Labour	Frank Field	22,082	62.5	−2.5
Conservative	Andrew Gilbert	6,687	18.9	+2.4
Liberal Democrats	Stuart Kelly	6,554	18.6	+0.1
Majority		15,395	43.6	−2.9
Turnout		35,523	56.6	+6.7
Labour hold		Swing	−2.7	

Back to Elections

=== Elections in the 2000s ===
General election 2005: Birkenhead
Party	Candidate	Votes	%	±%
Labour	Frank Field	18,059	65.0	−5.5
Liberal Democrats	Stuart Kelly	5,125	18.4	+5.6
Conservative	Howard Morton	4,602	16.6	−0.1
Majority		12,934	46.6	−7.2
Turnout		27,786	48.7	+0.4
Labour hold		Swing	−5.6	

General election 2001: Birkenhead
Party	Candidate	Votes	%	±%
Labour	Frank Field	20,418	70.5	−0.3
Conservative	Brian Stewart	4,827	16.7	+1.5
Liberal Democrats	Roy Wood	3,722	12.8	+3.8
Majority		15,591	53.8	−1.8
Turnout		28,967	48.3	−17.5
Labour hold		Swing	−0.9	

Back to Elections

=== Elections in the 1990s ===
General election 1997: Birkenhead
Party	Candidate	Votes	%	±%
Labour	Frank Field	27,825	70.8	+7.2
Conservative	John Crosby	5,982	15.2	−9.9
Liberal Democrats	Roy Wood	3,548	9.0	−0.7
Socialist Labour	Mark Cullen	1,168	3.0	N/A
Referendum	Richard Evans	800	2.0	N/A
Majority		21,843	55.6	+17.1
Turnout		39,323	65.8	−7.2
Labour hold		Swing	+8.6	

General election 1992: Birkenhead
Party	Candidate	Votes	%	±%
Labour	Frank Field	29,098	63.6	+4.9
Conservative	Robert Hughes	11,485	25.1	−1.3
Liberal Democrats	Pat M. Williams	4,417	9.7	−5.2
Green	Tina R. Fox	543	1.2	N/A
Natural Law	Bridget Griffiths	190	0.4	N/A
Majority		17,613	38.5	+6.2
Turnout		45,733	73.0	+0.7
Labour hold		Swing	+3.1	

Back to Elections

=== Elections in the 1980s ===
General election 1987: Birkenhead
Party	Candidate	Votes	%	±%
Labour	Frank Field	27,883	58.7	+9.1
Conservative	Kenneth Costa	12,511	26.4	−2.5
Liberal	Richard Kemp	7,095	14.9	−5.9
Majority		15,372	32.3	+11.6
Turnout		47,489	72.3	+2.6
Labour hold		Swing	+5.8	

General election 1983: Birkenhead
Party	Candidate	Votes	%	±%
Labour	Frank Field	23,249	49.6	−0.3
Conservative	Tom Peet	13,535	28.9	−6.8
Liberal	Gordon C. Lindsay	9,782	20.8	+7.1
Majority		9,714	20.7	+6.5
Turnout		46,566	69.7	−4.2
Labour hold		Swing	+3.6	

Back to Elections

=== Elections in the 1970s ===
General election 1979: Birkenhead
Party	Candidate	Votes	%	±%
Labour	Frank Field	20,803	49.9	−1.4
Conservative	P. Gill	14,894	35.7	+6.8
Liberal	Roy Perkins	5,708	13.7	−6.1
Workers Revolutionary	M. Fletcher	306	0.7	N/A
Majority		5,909	14.2	−8.2
Turnout		41,711	73.9	+3.7
Labour hold		Swing	−4.1	

General election October 1974: Birkenhead
Party	Candidate	Votes	%	±%
Labour	Edmund Dell	21,748	51.3	+6.1
Conservative	E. Gearing	12,264	28.9	−1.0
Liberal	Gordon Lindsay	8,380	19.8	−5.1
Majority		9,484	22.4	+7.1
Turnout		42,392	70.2	−6.3
Labour hold		Swing	+3.6	

General election February 1974: Birkenhead
Party	Candidate	Votes	%	±%
Labour	Edmund Dell	20,696	45.2	−5.5
Conservative	J.S. Pyke	13,702	29.9	−6.7
Liberal	Gordon Lindsay	11,410	24.9	+13.0
Majority		6,994	15.3	+1.2
Turnout		45,808	76.5	+5.7
Labour hold		Swing	+6.1	

General election 1970: Birkenhead
Party	Candidate	Votes	%	±%
Labour	Edmund Dell	20,980	50.7	−9.4
Conservative	Robert Kris	15,151	36.6	−1.8
Liberal	Gruffydd Evans	4,926	11.9	N/A
Communist	Barry Williams	351	0.9	−0.6
Majority		5,829	14.1	−7.6
Turnout		41,408	70.8	−2.1
Labour hold		Swing	−5.6	

Back to Elections

=== Elections in the 1960s ===
General election 1966: Birkenhead
Party	Candidate	Votes	%	±%
Labour	Edmund Dell	24,188	60.1	+3.1
Conservative	Robert Adley	15,438	38.4	−4.6
Communist	Barry Williams	604	1.5	N/A
Majority		8,750	21.7	+7.7
Turnout		40,230	72.9	−1.5
Labour hold		Swing	+3.9	

General election 1964: Birkenhead
Party	Candidate	Votes	%	±%
Labour	Edmund Dell	23,994	57.0	+8.1
Conservative	Robert Kenelm Morland	18,133	43.0	+1.8
Majority		5,861	14.0	+6.3
Turnout		42,127	74.4	−4.4
Labour hold		Swing	+5.0	

Back to Elections

=== Elections in the 1950s ===
General election 1959: Birkenhead
Party	Candidate	Votes	%	±%
Labour	Percy Collick	22,990	48.9	−4.6
Conservative	Kenneth Graham Routledge	19,361	41.2	−5.3
Liberal	G Frederick Bilson	4,658	9.9	N/A
Majority		3,629	7.7	+0.7
Turnout		47,009	78.8	+3.1
Labour hold		Swing	+5.0	

General election 1955: Birkenhead
Party	Candidate	Votes	%	±%
Labour	Percy Collick	24,526	53.5	−1.5
Conservative	Harry S. Oddie	21,345	46.5	+1.5
Majority		3,181	7.0	−3.0
Turnout		45,871	75.7	−7.1
Labour hold		Swing	−1.5	

General election 1951: Birkenhead
Party	Candidate	Votes	%	±%
Labour	Percy Collick	29,014	55.0	+5.1
Conservative	Maxwell Reney-Smith	23,765	45.0	+6.6
Majority		5,249	10.0	−1.5
Turnout		52,779	82.8	−2.1
Labour hold		Swing	−5.9	

General election 1950: Birkenhead
Party	Candidate	Votes	%	±%
Labour	Percy Collick	26,472	49.9	
Conservative	Horace Trevor-Cox	20,343	38.4	
Liberal	Denis Robertson Green	5,234	9.9	
Communist	S. Coulthard	971	1.8	
Majority		6,129	11.5	
Turnout		53,020	84.9	
Labour win (new seat)				

Back to Elections

=== Elections in the 1910s ===
General election December 1910: Birkenhead
Party	Candidate	Votes	%	±%
Conservative	Alfred Bigland	8,304	53.4	+3.8
Lib-Lab	Henry Vivian	7,249	46.6	−3.8
Majority		1,055	6.8	N/A
Turnout		15,553	85.5	−3.0
Registered electors		18,189		
Conservative gain from Lib-Lab		Swing	+3.8	

General election January 1910: Birkenhead
Party	Candidate	Votes	%	±%
Lib-Lab	Henry Vivian	8,120	50.4	+1.4
Conservative	Alfred Bigland	7,976	49.6	+13.2
Majority		144	0.8	−11.8
Turnout		16,096	88.5	+3.5
Registered electors		18,189		
Lib-Lab hold		Swing	−5.9	

Back to Elections

=== Elections in the 1900s ===
General election 1906: Birkenhead
Party	Candidate	Votes	%	±%
Lib-Lab	Henry Vivian	7,074	49.0	N/A
Conservative	Elliott Lees	5,271	36.4	N/A
Independent Protestant	John Alfred Kensit	2,118	14.6	N/A
Majority		1,803	12.6	N/A
Turnout		14,463	85.0	N/A
Registered electors		17,010		
Lib-Lab gain from Conservative		Swing	N/A	

General election 1900: Birkenhead
Party	Candidate	Votes	%	±%
Conservative	Elliott Lees	Unopposed		
Conservative hold				

Back to Elections

=== Elections in the 1890s ===
General election 1895: Birkenhead
Party	Candidate	Votes	%	±%
Conservative	Elliott Lees	6,178	50.8	−2.0
Liberal	William Lever	5,974	49.2	+2.0
Majority		204	1.6	−4.0
Turnout		12,152	85.1	+1.3
Registered electors		14,277		
Conservative hold		Swing	−2.0	

By-election, 1894: Birkenhead
Party	Candidate	Votes	%	±%
Conservative	Elliott Lees	6,149	50.4	−2.4
Liberal	William Lever	6,043	49.6	+2.4
Majority		106	0.8	−4.8
Turnout		12,192	85.3	+1.5
Registered electors		14,293		
Conservative hold		Swing	−2.4	

General election 1892: Birkenhead
Party	Candidate	Votes	%	±%
Conservative	Arnold Keppel	5,760	52.8	−3.5
Liberal	William Lever	5,156	47.2	+3.5
Majority		604	5.6	−7.0
Turnout		10,196	83.8	+6.7
Registered electors		13,031		
Conservative hold		Swing	−3.5	

Back to Elections

=== Elections in the 1880s ===
General election 1886: Birkenhead
Party	Candidate	Votes	%	±%
Conservative	Edward Bruce Hamley	5,255	56.3	+0.6
Liberal	William Rann Kennedy	4,086	43.7	−0.6
Majority		1,169	12.6	+1.2
Turnout		9,341	77.1	−7.9
Registered electors		12,115		
Conservative hold		Swing	+0.6	

General election 1885: Birkenhead
Party	Candidate	Votes	%	±%
Conservative	Edward Bruce Hamley	5,733	55.7	+3.3
Liberal	William Rann Kennedy	4,560	44.3	−3.3
Majority		1,173	11.4	+6.6
Turnout		10,293	85.0	+0.8
Registered electors		12,115		
Conservative hold		Swing	+3.3	

General election 1880: Birkenhead
Party	Candidate	Votes	%	±%
Conservative	David MacIver	4,025	52.4	−17.6
Liberal	Arthur John Williams	3,658	47.6	+17.6
Majority		367	4.8	−35.2
Turnout		7,683	84.2	+13.5
Registered electors		9,127		
Conservative hold		Swing	−17.6	

Back to Elections

=== Elections in the 1870s ===
By-election, 26 Nov 1874: Birkenhead
Party	Candidate	Votes	%	±%
Conservative	David MacIver	3,421	58.0	−12.0
Liberal	Samuel Stitt	2,474	42.0	+12.0
Majority		947	16.0	−24.0
Turnout		5,895	79.0	+8.3
Registered electors		7,458		
Conservative hold		Swing	−12.0	

- Caused by Laird's death.

General election 1874: Birkenhead
Party	Candidate	Votes	%	±%
Conservative	John Laird	3,692	70.0	+11.1
Lib-Lab	James Samuelson	1,580	30.0	−11.1
Majority		2,112	40.0	+22.2
Turnout		5,272	70.7	−13.5
Registered electors		7,458		
Conservative hold		Swing	+11.1	

Back to Elections

=== Elections in the 1860s ===
General election 1868: Birkenhead
Party	Candidate	Votes	%	±%
Conservative	John Laird	2,921	58.9	−7.4
Liberal	Sherard Osborn	2,039	41.1	+7.4
Majority		882	17.8	−14.8
Turnout		4,960	84.2	+14.5
Registered electors		5,892		
Conservative hold		Swing	−7.4	

General election 1865: Birkenhead
Party	Candidate	Votes	%	±%
Conservative	John Laird	2,108	66.3	
Liberal	Henry Jackson	1,073	33.7	
Majority		1,035	32.6	
Turnout		3,181	69.7	
Registered electors		4,563		
Conservative win (new seat)				

While the seat was created in 1861, it is considered a new seat for the purposes of the 1865 general election.

By-election, 11 Dec 1861: Birkenhead
Party	Candidate	Votes	%	±%
Conservative	John Laird	1,643	55.9	
Liberal	Thomas Brassey	1,296	44.1	
Majority		347	11.8	
Turnout		2,939	84.2	
Registered electors		3,489		
Conservative win (new seat)				

Back to Elections

== See also ==
- List of parliamentary constituencies in Merseyside
- History of parliamentary constituencies and boundaries in Cheshire

== Sources ==
- Craig, F. W. S. (1983) [1969]. British parliamentary election results 1918-1949 (3rd ed.). Chichester: Parliamentary Research Services. ISBN 0-900178-06-X.
