= Brunswick Park, Southwark =

Public park located in Camberwell, London

Coordinates: 51.475503°N 0.085535645°W

Brunswick Park is a 4-acre (1.6 ha) public park located in Camberwell, in South East London, and is managed by the London Borough of Southwark. Originally a private square, the park was opened to the public in 1907.

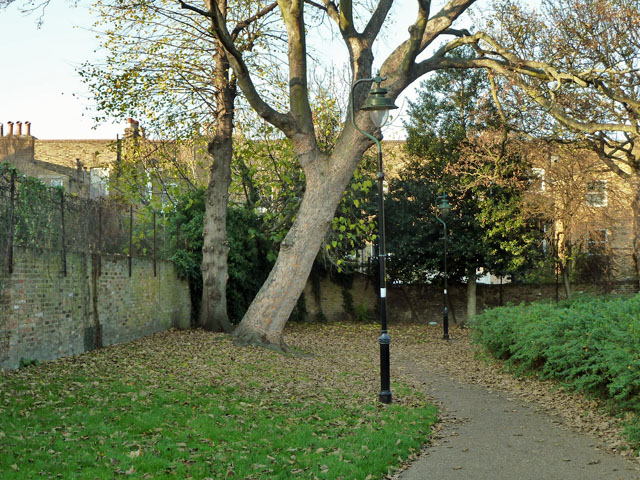

== Origins ==
According to the Domesday survey of 1086, there were 63-acre (25 ha) of meadows owned by the parish church of St Giles as part of the glebe. That meadow land included the site of what is now Brunswick Park. It was still fields in 1842. Land was purchased by a developer, WJ Hudson, in 1847, with an open space in the centre. That open space was named Brunswick Square, after Caroline of Brunswick, the estranged wife of George IV.

The Metropolitan Borough of Camberwell acquired the garden by compulsory purchase in 1901, with the London County Council providing some of the funding. The garden had been divided by a road, and this was then incorporated into the new park, which, after being laid out as a public park, was opened in 1907.

== Features ==
In 1937 two hard court tennis courts and a playground (including an ocean wave) were installed. A drinking fountain was donated by the Metropolitan Drinking Fountain and Cattle Trough Association. The park was refurbished in 1999. There are still two tennis courts, and there is now also a basketball court.

The park is scheduled under the London Squares Preservation Act 1931 (21 & 22 Geo. 5. c. xciii). There are no listed structures or buildings in the park itself, although some of the buildings on surrounding streets are listed, including the administration building from the former St Giles' Hospital. A Southwark blue plaque commemorating the activist Una Marson is located at 16 Brunswick Park, adjacent to the park itself.

== outhouse gallery ==
outhouse gallery is an independent, artist-run creative space located in a former public convenience inside Brunswick Park. The space occupies the structure previously used by The Bower, a former non-profit art gallery and community project that operated in the park from 2018 until 2023Derelict for 20 years, the former public toilet block was converted to a feminist art gallery, The Bower, in 2018. The conversion was part-funded by crowdfunding and part by the Esmée Fairbairn Foundation. The owners of The Bower also converted the disused former park-keeper’s cottage into a café. Since 2018 an annual outdoor film festival has been held in the park, programmed by The Bower. In 2020, due to the Coronavirus pandemic, it was held online. There is an associated artistic programme.

== Friends ==
There is an active Friends of Brunswick Park group.
