= Senedd constituencies =

Welsh Parliament electoral districts

- Also known as: Senedd Cymru or Welsh Parliament constituencies
- Map of the 16 constituencies of the Senedd in Wales from May 2026 (Note: Labelled using their sole Welsh names, with Caerdydd being the Welsh name for Cardiff)
- Category: Electoral district
- Location: Wales
- Created by: Senedd Cymru (Members and Elections) Act 2024
- Created: 7 May 2026; 6 months ago
- Number: 16
- Populations: 163,460 (Bangor Conwy Môn) – 220,137 (Caerdydd Penarth)
- Government: Senedd; Welsh Government

The Senedd constituencies (Welsh: etholaethau Senedd Cymru) (Note: They are known as Senedd constituencies, and previously alongside Senedd electoral regions in the Senedd and Elections (Wales) Act 2020 and revised Government of Wales Act 2006, but may be alternatively titled by Senedd Research, and English-language news sources as Welsh Parliament constituencies and electoral regions, or Senedd Cymru constituencies and electoral regions. The districts were formerly known as National Assembly for Wales constituencies and electoral regions, or informally, (Welsh) Assembly constituencies and electoral regions from its establishment in 1999 until May 2020, when it was renamed to its current name(s).) are the electoral districts used to elect members of the Senedd (MS; Welsh: Aelodau'r Senedd or AS) to the Senedd (Welsh Parliament; Welsh: Senedd Cymru). Following reforms to the Senedd, sixteen new six-member constituencies were first contested at the 2026 Senedd election in May 2026, electing 96 members in total. The Senedd constituencies are not used for local government.

From the first election of the then National Assembly for Wales in 1999, until just prior to the 2026 Senedd election, forty single-member constituencies and five four-member electoral regions (Welsh: rhanbarthau etholiadol), electing 60 Senedd members in total, had been used. This first set of constituencies and electoral regions were created through the Government of Wales Act 1998, which established the National Assembly for Wales. The Assembly's constituencies were initially linked to the boundaries used for UK Parliament constituencies in Wales, set by the UK Parliament's Boundary Commission for Wales, except a delay in implementing new boundaries between the 2007 Assembly election and the subsequent 2010 UK election. The Parliamentary Voting System and Constituencies Act 2011, unlinked the two sets of constituencies, meaning any changes to one set, no longer affected the other.

Subsequently, the UK Parliament introduced new constituencies for its 2024 UK election, and in 2024 the Democracy and Boundary Commission Cymru was given the responsibility to conduct boundary reviews of Senedd constituencies, as there had been no designated body responsible since 2011. Following the 2026 boundary review, 16 six-member constituencies are to be used at the 2026 Senedd election, whilst the electoral regions are being abolished. The new 16 constituencies are contiguous pairings of the UK Parliament constituencies in Wales and only have Welsh names. Another review will be conducted before the 2030 election.

== Current constituencies (from 2026) ==
The following is the list of current constituencies, in use from the 2026 Senedd election, and their current members.

Constituency	County	Current members	Population (2024)	Map
Afan Ogwr Rhondda	Glamorgan	Steve Bayliss (Reform); Alun Cox (Plaid Cymru); Sera Evans (Plaid Cymru); Huw Irranca-Davies (Labour); Benjamin McKenna (Reform); Elyn Stephens (Plaid Cymru)	194,083	
Bangor Conwy Môn	Clwyd, Gwynedd	Rhun ap Iorwerth (Plaid Cymru); John Clark (Reform); Janet Finch-Saunders (Conservative); Helen Jenner (Reform); Mair Rowlands (Plaid Cymru); Elfed Williams (Plaid Cymru)	163,460	
Blaenau Gwent Caerffili Rhymni	Glamorgan, Gwent	Catherine Cullen (Reform); Delyth Jewell (Plaid Cymru); Joshua Kim (Reform); Niamh Salkeld (Plaid Cymru); Llŷr Powell (Reform); Lindsay Whittle (Plaid Cymru)	192,579	
Brycheiniog Tawe Nedd	Glamorgan, Powys	Jane Dodds (Liberal Democrat); James Evans (Reform); Iain McIntosh (Reform); David Mills (Reform); Rebeca Phillips (Plaid Cymru); Sioned Williams (Plaid Cymru)	194,514	
Caerdydd Ffynnon Taf	Glamorgan	Zaynub Akbar (Plaid Cymru); Nick Carter (Plaid Cymru); Cai Parry-Jones (Reform); Paul Rock (Green); Shav Taj (Labour); Dafydd Trystan (Plaid Cymru)	212,885	
Caerdydd Penarth	Glamorgan	Anna Brychan (Plaid Cymru); Leticia Gonzalez (Plaid Cymru); Kiera Marshall (Plaid Cymru); Joe Martin (Reform); Anthony Slaughter (Green); Huw Thomas (Labour)	220,137	
Casnewydd Islwyn	Gwent	Lyn Ackerman (Plaid Cymru); Natasha Asghar (Conservative); Jayne Bryant (Labour); Peredur Owen Griffiths (Plaid Cymru); Dan Thomas (Reform); Art Wright (Reform)	220,058	
Ceredigion Penfro	Dyfed	Claire Archibald (Reform); Paul Davies (Conservative); Kerry Ferguson (Plaid Cymru); Elin Jones (Plaid Cymru); Paul Marr (Reform); Anna Nicholl (Plaid Cymru)	198,360	
Clwyd	Clwyd	Louise Emery (Reform); Llyr Gruffydd (Plaid Cymru); Becca Martin (Plaid Cymru); Adrian Mason (Reform); Darren Millar (Conservative); Thomas Montgomery (Reform)	198,297	
Fflint Wrecsam	Clwyd	Cristiana Emsley (Reform); Carrie Harper (Plaid Cymru); Marc Jones (Plaid Cymru); Sam Rowlands (Conservative); Ken Skates (Labour); Nigel Williams (Reform)	204,672	
Gwynedd Maldwyn	Gwynedd, Powys, Clwyd	Mabon ap Gwynfor (Plaid Cymru); Beca Brown (Plaid Cymru); Andrew Griffin (Reform); Siân Gwenllian (Plaid Cymru); Claire Johnson-Wood (Reform); Elwyn Vaughan (Plaid Cymru)	195,838	
Gŵyr Abertawe	Glamorgan	John Davies (Plaid Cymru); Safa Elhassan (Plaid Cymru); Mike Hedges (Labour); Francesca O'Brien (Reform); Steven Rodaway (Reform); Gwyn Williams (Plaid Cymru)	211,891	
Pen-y-bont Bro Morgannwg	Glamorgan	Sarah Cooper-Lesadd (Reform); Andrew RT Davies (Conservative); Mark Hooper (Plaid Cymru); Sarah Murphy (Labour); Sarah Rees (Plaid Cymru); Gaz Thomas (Reform)	194,600	
Pontypridd Cynon Merthyr	Glamorgan	Sara Crowley (Plaid Cymru); Heledd Fychan (Plaid Cymru); Vikki Howells (Labour); David Hughes (Reform); Lis McLean (Plaid Cymru); Jason O'Connell (Reform)	205,358	
Sir Fynwy Torfaen	Gwent	Donna Cushing (Plaid Cymru); Peter Fox (Conservative); Matthew Jones (Plaid Cymru); Laura Anne Jones (Reform); Lynne Neagle (Labour); Stephen Senior (Reform)	189,049	
Sir Gaerfyrddin	Dyfed	Gareth Beer (Reform); Cefin Campbell (Plaid Cymru); Carmelo Colasanto (Reform); Sarah Edwards (Reform); Nerys Evans (Plaid Cymru); Adam Price (Plaid Cymru)	190,800	

== History ==
=== Establishment ===
Following the 1997 Welsh devolution referendum, where a narrow majority voted in support of the creation of a devolved Welsh Assembly, constituencies of the devolved legislature were established.

Section 2 of the Government of Wales Act 1998 stipulates that the constituencies for the National Assembly for Wales be the same as the constituencies used for elections to the United Kingdom Parliament. The same act sets out the creation of five regions which would use the same borders as the five European Parliamentary constituencies in Wales which themselves were set out in the European Parliamentary Constituencies (Wales) Order 1994, used for elections to the European Parliament between 1994 and 1999. The electoral regions set out are still used, despite the abolishment of the five European Parliamentary constituencies for an all-Wales constituency, and the withdrawal of the UK from the European Union. Although minor border adjustments to the regions have taken place.

=== 2007 change in boundaries ===
In 2006, the Government of Wales Act 2006 was enacted. When enacted the act reinforced the link between Assembly and UK Parliamentary constituencies, and that the number of electoral regions is five.

Following the fifth periodic review of Westminster constituencies, new borders for the constituencies and electoral regions were defined by the Parliamentary Constituencies and Assembly Electoral Regions (Wales) Order 2006.

The order detailed the abolition of three constituencies (Caernarfon, Conwy, and Meironnydd Nant Conwy), with three new constituencies to replace them (Aberconwy, Arfon, and Dwyfor Meirionnydd). Nine constituencies were subject to "substantial" border adjustments involving the transfer of more than 3,000 inhabitants between constituencies. A further eight constituencies were subject to boundary changes resulting in the redistribution of fewer than 3,000 inhabitants between each constituency, and a further four constituencies were subject to minor boundary adjustments that led to minimal transfers of inhabitants between constituencies. The remaining sixteen constituencies were not subject to any boundary or name modifications.

The three new constituencies straddled the border of the electoral regions of Mid and West Wales and North Wales, leading to adjustments in the boundaries of both electoral regions, in addition to minor adjustments to the constituency of Montgomeryshire also leading to minor regional boundary adjustments. In south Wales, the boundaries of the electoral regions, South Wales West, and South Wales Central were altered to accommodate changes to the boundaries of Bridgend, and Vale of Glamorgan constituencies.

The changes in the boundaries for constituencies and electoral regions of the Senedd came into force for the 2007 National Assembly for Wales election.

=== Delinking from UK parliament constituencies ===
Section 13(1) of the Parliamentary Voting System and Constituencies Act 2011 states that:

The Assembly constituencies are the constituencies specified in the Parliamentary

Constituencies and Assembly Electoral Regions (Wales) Order 2006 (S.I. 2006/1041)24 as amended by— the Parliamentary Constituencies and Assembly Electoral Regions (Wales) (Amendment)

Order 2008 (S.I. 2008/1791)

— Parliamentary Voting System and Constituencies Act 2011

This details that any further changes to the UK Parliament constituencies in Wales specified in the act (notably the proposed reduction in constituencies to 30) will not be applied to Assembly (Senedd) constituencies.

In a session of the House of Commons where the then secretary of state for Wales, Cheryl Gillan was questioned on the Labour party's opposition to the decoupling of the two constituencies, she replied:

That is a very interesting thought. Hon. Members are well aware that the Parliamentary Voting System and Constituencies Act 2011 broke the link between Assembly constituencies and parliamentary constituencies. I have agreed that we need to look carefully at the implications of having constituency boundaries relating to different areas and regions for UK and Assembly elections in Wales.

— Rt. Hon Cheryl Gillan MP

Boundaries of Senedd constituencies and electoral regions were initially not overseen by any statutory review body, following the delinking of Senedd and UK Parliament constituencies in 2011. With the responsibility for proposing alterations to the boundaries of UK Parliament constituencies in Wales, and reporting to the UK Government, lay with the Boundary Commission for Wales. At the time, both constituencies had the same boundaries. Organisations such as the Electoral Reform Society Cymru indicated a preference for coterminosity (mirroring Senedd and UK Parliament constituencies, especially during the 2016 proposed reforms). However, such coterminosity was merely desired and was not enforced by law, meaning any changes to UK Parliament constituencies in Wales did not need to be mirrored for Senedd constituencies. The 2023 review of Westminster constituencies reduced the number of UK Parliament constituencies in Wales from 40 to 32, and were used from the 2024 UK election. While the Senedd is to introduce larger constituencies composed of pairings of the 32 from 2026.

=== 2020 renaming ===
On 6 May 2020, the Senedd and Elections (Wales) Act 2020 came into force, renaming the Assembly constituencies and Assembly electoral regions of the National Assembly for Wales, to the Senedd constituencies and Senedd electoral regions of "Senedd Cymru" or "the Welsh Parliament", known in both Welsh and English as the Senedd.

=== 2024–25 boundary review ===
The Senedd Cymru (Members and Elections) Act 2024, passed by the Senedd in May 2024, gave the responsibility for conducting boundary reviews of Senedd constituencies to the Democracy and Boundary Commission Cymru. The commission would be responsible to conduct reviews for specifically both the 2026 Senedd election and the 2030 Senedd election, as well as regular reviews thereafter. The 2026 review was time-constricted, therefore the 2030 review, the first full boundary review in 18 years, would provide the commission with more flexibility.

The Senedd Cymru (Members and Elections) Act 2024 legislated that the 2026 election should use 16 six-member constituencies, replacing the existing 40 constituencies and five regions, with the Democracy and Boundary Commission Cymru conducting the review. The law set out that they must be contiguous pairings of the 32 UK Parliament constituencies used in Wales since 2024, and to only use a single name in both Welsh and English, unless it could be considered unacceptable for a single name. The review commenced in July 2024, with initial proposals revealed in September 2024, and revised proposals in December 2024. A major change in the revised proposals was the use of mostly Welsh-language names only to meet the condition in law, therefore all (except four) had only one name, its Welsh name. The decision received support from Cymdeithas yr Iaith, but opposition from Andrew RT Davies, former leader of the Welsh Conservatives. In March 2025, the commission published its final determinations, for the 16 constituencies (see § Proposed constituencies (2026)). The original initial proposal boundaries were re-adopted, while all constituencies were made to use Welsh-only names, with a reiteration of both support and opposition from Cymdeithas and Davies respectively, as well as consultation respondents. By law, the Senedd must put these final determinations into effect for the 2026 Senedd election without alteration.

=== 2030 boundary review ===
The 2030 boundary review was launched by Democracy and Boundary Commission Cymru on 9 September 2026. It will follow the Local Government (Democracy) (Wales) Act 2013, since amended as the Democracy and Boundary Commission Cymru etc. Act 2013, where the sixteen Senedd constituencies must be within 10% of the electoral quota, so between 90% and 110% of the quota. The electoral register had 2,402,053 people registered, therefore the electoral quota for each constituency is 150,128, so each constituency must be between 135,225 and 165,275 voters. Initial proposals are to be released in early 2027, followed by an 8-week consultation period, with the final determinations to be submitted before 1 December 2028. The new boundaries would replace those used for the 2026 election. The decision to use Welsh-only names for the 2026 constituencies may be revised following public consultation due to the initial decision raising some opposition. Existing legislation still requires a single name to be used where possible, although if no single bilingual name reflecting an area's identity could be found then a bilingual name may be considered.

== List of historic constituencies and electoral regions (1999–2026) ==
Senedd constituencies and electoral regions (2020–2026)
- Also known as: Senedd Cymru / Welsh Parliament constituencies and electoral regions National Assembly for Wales constituencies and electoral regions (1999–2020)
- Map of the 40 constituencies (left side) and the 5 electoral regions (right side) of the Senedd in Wales
- Category: Electoral district
- Location: Wales
- Created by: Government of Wales Act 1998
- Created: 12 May 1999; 27 years ago
- Number: 40 constituencies 5 regions (Note: Consisting of between 7-9 constituencies.) (as of 2021)
- Populations: Constituency: 43,125 (Arfon) – 81,366 (Cardiff South and Penarth) Region: 413,569 (South Wales West) – 523,096 (South Wales Central)
- Government: Senedd; Welsh Government

Under the Additional Member System in place until May 2026, there were forty single-member constituencies and five four-member regions. The five electoral regions were: Mid and West Wales, North Wales, South Wales Central, South Wales East, and South Wales West; each region roughly contained 500,000 people and each constituency contained a population of around 60,000. The forty constituencies are listed below. The final election under the Additional Member System was the 2025 Caerphilly by-election and the final general election was the 2021 Senedd election, with boundaries that were also used for the Assembly elections of 2007, 2011, and 2016.

Senedd constituencies were grouped into electoral regions consisting of between seven and nine constituencies. An additional member system was used to elect four additional Members of the Senedd from each region, in addition to the MSs elected by the constituencies. The Electoral Region boundaries were based upon the pre-1999 European Parliament constituencies. At each general election of the Senedd, each elector had two votes, one constituency vote and one regional party-list vote. Each constituency elected one Member by the first past the post (single-member district plurality, SMDP) system, and the additional Senedd seats were filled from regional closed party lists, under the D'Hondt method, with constituency results being taken into account, to produce a degree of proportional representation for each region. Altogether, the sixty Members of the Senedd were elected from the forty constituencies and five electoral regions, creating a Senedd of forty constituency MSs and twenty additional MSs, with every constituent represented by one constituency member and four regional members.

The constituencies were the same as those used for elections to the House of Commons of the United Kingdom until the 2024 United Kingdom general election but not linked to them. The borders of each constituency were drawn using Local government boundaries, defined in Parliamentary Voting System and Constituencies Act 2011 as "the boundaries of counties, county boroughs, electoral divisions, communities and community wards".

=== 2007–2026 constituencies ===
Constituency (Welsh name)	Electoral population (March 2020)	Principal areas	Electoral region
Aberavon Aberafan	51,450	Neath Port Talbot	South Wales West
Aberconwy (2007–2026)	45,426	Conwy	North Wales
Alyn and Deeside Alun a Glannau Dyfrdwy	65,183	Flintshire; Wrexham	North Wales
Arfon (2007–2026)	43,125	Gwynedd	North Wales
Blaenau Gwent	51,495	Blaenau Gwent	South Wales East
Brecon and Radnorshire Brycheiniog a Sir Faesyfed	55,124	Powys	Mid and West Wales
Bridgend Pen-y-bont ar Ogwr	64,245	Bridgend	South Wales West
Caerphilly Caerffili	64,926	Caerphilly; Newport	South Wales East
Cardiff Central Canol Caerdydd	63,017	Cardiff	South Wales Central
Cardiff North Gogledd Caerdydd	69,143	Cardiff	South Wales Central
Cardiff South and Penarth De Caerdydd a Phenarth	81,366	Cardiff	South Wales Central
Cardiff West Gorllewin Caerdydd	69,511	Cardiff	South Wales Central
Carmarthen East and Dinefwr Dwyrain Caerfyrddin a Dinefwr	58,048	Carmarthenshire	Mid and West Wales
Carmarthen West and South Pembrokeshire Gorllewin Caerfyrddin a De Sir Benfro	59,924	Carmarthenshire; Pembrokeshire	Mid and West Wales
Ceredigion	56,634	Ceredigion	Mid and West Wales
Clwyd South De Clwyd	54,747	Denbighshire; Wrexham	North Wales
Clwyd West Gorllewin Clwyd	58,024	Conwy; Denbighshire	North Wales
Cynon Valley Cwm Cynon	51,461	Rhondda Cynon Taf	South Wales Central
Delyn	55,604	Conwy; Flintshire	North Wales
Dwyfor Meirionnydd (2007–2026)	44,882	Gwynedd	Mid and West Wales
Gower Gŵyr	62,763	Swansea	South Wales West
Islwyn	56,841	Caerphilly	South Wales East
Llanelli	62,196	Carmarthenshire; Swansea	Mid and West Wales
Merthyr Tydfil and Rhymney Merthyr Tudful a Rhymni	57,883	Caerphilly; Merthyr Tydfil	South Wales East
Monmouth Sir Fynwy	67,252	Monmouthshire	South Wales East
Montgomeryshire Sir Drefaldwyn	49,691	Powys	Mid and West Wales
Neath Castell-nedd	57,032	Neath Port Talbot	South Wales West
Newport East Dwyrain Casnewydd	60,936	Newport	South Wales East
Newport West Gorllewin Casnewydd	68,748	Newport	South Wales East
Ogmore Ogwr	57,934	Rhondda Cynon Taf; Bridgend	South Wales West
Pontypridd	60,923	Rhondda Cynon Taf	South Wales Central
Preseli Pembrokeshire Preseli Sir Benfro	60,025	Pembrokeshire	Mid and West Wales
Rhondda	50,471	Rhondda Cynon Taf	South Wales Central
Swansea East Dwyrain Abertawe	60,726	Swansea	South Wales West
Swansea West Gorllewin Abertawe	59,419	Swansea	South Wales West
Torfaen	63,061	Torfaen	South Wales East
Vale of Clwyd Dyffryn Clwyd	56,307	Denbighshire	North Wales
Vale of Glamorgan Bro Morgannwg	77,204	Vale of Glamorgan	South Wales Central
Wrexham Wrecsam	52,713	Wrexham	North Wales
Ynys Môn	52,610	Isle of Anglesey	North Wales

=== 1999–2007 constituencies ===
Former constituencies and regions (1999–2007)

Between the first election in 1999 for the then National Assembly for Wales, to the 2007 election, there were three former constituencies. These constituencies were replaced at the 2007 election, with new boundaries and names.

Three constituency names, Conwy, Caernarfon, and Meirionydd Nant Conwy, became historic, and the new boundaries defined three constituencies with new names: Arfon, Dwyfor Meirionnydd, and Aberconwy. Generally, the new boundaries define each constituency taking into account local government ward boundaries, and define constituencies close to equal in terms of the sizes of their electorates.

Former constituency	Region of former constituency	Replacement constituencies	Regions of replacement constituencies	Preserved county
Caernarfon	North Wales	Arfon	North Wales	Gwynedd
Caernarfon	North Wales	Dwyfor Meirionnydd	Mid and West Wales	Gwynedd
Conwy	North Wales	Arfon	North Wales	Clwyd
Conwy	North Wales	Aberconwy	North Wales	Gwynedd
Meirionnydd Nant Conwy	Mid and West Wales	Aberconwy	North Wales	Clwyd
Meirionnydd Nant Conwy	Mid and West Wales	Dwyfor Meirionnydd	Mid and West Wales	Gwynedd

=== Former electoral regions ===
Electoral region (Welsh name)	Number of constituencies	Constituencies (ordered alphabetically)	Electoral population (March 2020)	Image (numbered alphabetically)
Mid and West Wales Canolbarth a Gorllewin Cymru	8	Brecon and Radnorshire, Carmarthen East and Dinefwr, Carmarthen West and South Pembrokeshire, Ceredigion, Dwyfor Meirionnydd, Llanelli, Montgomeryshire, Preseli Pembrokeshire	446,524	
North Wales Gogledd Cymru	9	Aberconwy, Alyn and Deeside, Arfon, Clwyd South, Clwyd West, Delyn, Vale of Clwyd, Wrexham, Ynys Môn	483,739	
South Wales Central Canol De Cymru	8	Cardiff Central, Cardiff North, Cardiff South and Penarth, Cardiff West, Cynon Valley, Pontypridd, Rhondda, Vale of Glamorgan	523,096	
South Wales East Dwyrain De Cymru	8	Blaenau Gwent, Caerphilly, Islwyn, Merthyr Tydfil and Rhymney, Monmouth, Newport East, Newport West, Torfaen	491,142	
South Wales West Gorllewin De Cymru	7	Aberavon, Bridgend, Gower, Neath, Ogmore, Swansea East, Swansea West	413,569	

== See also ==
- Boundary Commission for Wales
- Democracy and Boundary Commission Cymru
- Scottish Parliament constituencies and electoral regions
- Northern Ireland Assembly constituencies
