= List of female members of the Senedd =

This is a list of women who are or have been members of the Senedd.

== List of female members of the Senedd ==
Party	Name	Constituency	Start	End	Reason
Labour	Lorraine Barrett	Cardiff South and Penarth	1999	2011	Retired
Labour	Rosemary Butler	Newport West	1999	2016	Retired
Labour	Christine Chapman	Cynon Valley	1999	2016	Retired
Labour	Jane Davidson	Pontypridd	1999	2011	Retired
Plaid Cymru	Janet Davies	South Wales West	1999	2007	Retired
Plaid Cymru	Jocelyn Davies	South Wales East	1999	2016	Retired
Labour	Sue Essex	Cardiff North	1999	2007	Retired
Labour	Val Feld	Swansea East	1999	2001	Died
Labour	Janice Gregory	Ogmore	1999	2016	Retired
Labour	Christine Gwyther	Carmarthen West and South Pembrokeshire	1999	2007	Defeated
Labour	Alison Halford	Delyn	1999	2003	Retired
Labour	Edwina Hart	Gower	1999	2016	Retired
Liberal Democrats	Christine Humphreys	North Wales	1999	2001	Resigned
Labour	Jane Hutt	Vale of Glamorgan	1999	2026	Retired
Plaid Cymru	Pauline Jarman	South Wales Central	1999	2003	Retired
Labour	Ann Jones	Vale of Clwyd	1999	2021	Retired
Plaid Cymru	Elin Jones	Ceredigion (1999–2026); Ceredigion Penfro (2026–present)	1999	present	Serving
Plaid Cymru	Helen Mary Jones	Llanelli (1999–2003); Mid and West Wales (2003–2007); Llanelli (2007–2011)	1999	2011	Defeated
Plaid Cymru	Helen Mary Jones	Mid and West Wales	2018	2021	Defeated
Labour	Lynne Neagle	Torfaen (1999–2026); Sir Fynwy Torfaen (2026–present)	1999	present	Serving
Liberal Democrats	Jenny Randerson (Note: Also served as a Member of the House of Lords.)	Cardiff Central	1999	2011	Retired
Plaid Cymru	Janet Ryder	North Wales	1999	2011	Retired
Labour	Karen Sinclair	Clwyd South	1999	2011	Retired
Labour	Gwenda Thomas	Neath	1999	2016	Retired
Liberal Democrats	Kirsty Williams	Brecon and Radnorshire	1999	2021	Retired
Labour	Delyth Evans	Mid and West Wales	2000	2003	Retired
Liberal Democrats	Eleanor Burnham	North Wales	2001	2011	Defeated
Labour	Val Lloyd	Swansea East	2001	2011	Retired
Labour	Tamsin Dunwoody	Preseli Pembrokeshire	2003	2007	Defeated
Conservative	Lisa Francis	Mid and West Wales	2003	2007	Defeated
Labour	Irene James	Islwyn	2003	2011	Retired
Conservative	Laura Anne Jones	South Wales East	2003	2007	Defeated
Conservative	Laura Anne Jones	South Wales East (2020–2026); Sir Fynwy Torfaen (2026–present)	2020	2025	Defected
Reform	Laura Anne Jones	South Wales East (2020–2026); Sir Fynwy Torfaen (2026–present)	2025	present	Serving
Labour	Sandy Mewies	Delyn	2003	2016	Retired
Labour	Catherine Thomas	Llanelli	2003	2007	Defeated
Plaid Cymru	Leanne Wood	South Wales Central (2003–2016); Rhondda (2016–2021)	2003	2021	Defeated
Blaenau Gwent PV	Trish Law	Blaenau Gwent	2006	2011	Retired
Conservative	Angela Burns	Carmarthen West and South Pembrokeshire	2007	2021	Defeated
Plaid Cymru	Nerys Evans	Mid and West Wales	2007	2011	Defeated
Plaid Cymru	Nerys Evans	Sir Gaerfyrddin	2026	present	Serving
Labour	Lesley Griffiths	Wrexham	2007	2026	Retired
Plaid Cymru	Bethan Sayed (Note: Bethan Sayed was known as Bethan Jenkins from 2007 to 2018.)	South Wales West	2007	2021	Retired
Labour	Joyce Watson	Mid and West Wales	2007	2026	Retired
Liberal Democrats	Veronica German	South Wales East	2010	2011	Defeated
Conservative	Suzy Davies	South Wales West	2011	2021	Retired
Labour	Rebecca Evans	Gower	2011	2026	Retired
Conservative	Janet Finch-Saunders	Aberconwy (2011–2026); Bangor Conwy Môn (2026–present)	2011	present	Serving
Labour	Julie James	Swansea West	2011	2026	Retired
Labour	Julie Morgan (Note: Also served as a Member of Parliament (MP).)	Cardiff North	2011	2026	Retired
Liberal Democrats	Eluned Parrott	South Wales Central	2011	2016	Defeated
Labour	Jenny Rathbone	Cardiff Central	2011	2026	Retired
Conservative	Antoinette Sandbach	North Wales	2011	2015	Resigned
Conservative	Janet Haworth	North Wales	2015	2016	Defeated
Labour	Hannah Blythyn	Delyn	2016	2026	Defeated
Labour	Dawn Bowden	Merthyr Tydfil and Rhymney	2016	2026	Retired
UKIP	Michelle Brown	North Wales	2016	2019	Defected
Independent	Michelle Brown	North Wales	2019	2021	Defeated
Labour	Jayne Bryant	Newport West (2016–2026); Casnewydd Islwyn (2026–present)	2016	present	Serving
Plaid Cymru	Siân Gwenllian	Arfon (2016–2016); Gwynedd Maldwyn (2026–present)	2016	present	Serving
Labour	Vikki Howells	Cynon Valley (2016–2026); Pontypridd Cynon Merthyr (2026–present)	2016	present	Serving
UKIP	Caroline Jones	South Wales West	2016	2018	Defected
Independent	Caroline Jones	South Wales West	2018	2019	Defected
Brexit Party	Caroline Jones	South Wales West	2019	2020	Defected
Independent Alliance for Reform	Caroline Jones	South Wales West	2020	2021	Defeated
Labour	Eluned Morgan (Note: Also served as a Member of the European Parliament (MEP).)	Mid and West Wales	2016	2026	Defeated
Labour	Rhianon Passmore	Islwyn	2016	2026	Defeated
UKIP	Mandy Jones	North Wales	2017	2018	Defected
Independent	Mandy Jones	North Wales	2018	2019	Defected
Brexit Party	Mandy Jones	North Wales	2019	2020	Defected
Independent Alliance for Reform	Mandy Jones	North Wales	2020	2021	Defeated
Plaid Cymru	Delyth Jewell	South Wales East (2019–2026); Blaenau Gwent Caerffili Rhymni (2026–present)	2019	present	Serving
Conservative	Natasha Asghar	South Wales East (2021–2026); Casnewydd Islwyn (2026–present)	2021	present	Serving
Liberal Democrats	Jane Dodds	Mid and West Wales (2021–2026); Brycheiniog Tawe Nedd (2026–present)	2021	present	Serving
Plaid Cymru	Heledd Fychan	South Wales Central (2021–2026); Pontypridd Cynon Merthyr (2026–present)	2021	present	Serving
Labour	Sarah Murphy	Bridgend (2021–2026); Pen-y-bont Bro Morgannwg (2026–present)	2021	present	Serving
Labour	Carolyn Thomas	North Wales	2021	2026	Defeated
Labour	Buffy Williams	Rhondda	2021	2026	Defeated
Plaid Cymru	Sioned Williams	South Wales West (2021–2026); Brycheiniog Tawe Nedd (2026–present)	2021	present	Serving
Plaid Cymru	Lyn Ackerman	Casnewydd Islwyn	2026	present	Serving
Plaid Cymru	Zaynub Akbar	Caerdydd Ffynnon Taf	2026	present	Serving
Reform	Claire Archibald	Ceredigion Penfro	2026	present	Serving
Plaid Cymru	Beca Brown	Gwynedd Maldwyn	2026	present	Serving
Plaid Cymru	Anna Brychan	Caerdydd Penarth	2026	present	Serving
Reform	Sarah Cooper-Lesadd	Pen-y-bont Bro Morgannwg	2026	2026	Defected
Plaid Cymru	Sarah Cooper-Lesadd	Pen-y-bont Bro Morgannwg	2026	present	Serving
Plaid Cymru	Sara Crowley	Pontypridd Cynon Merthyr	2026	present	Serving
Reform	Catherine Cullen	Blaenau Gwent Caerffili Rhymni	2026	present	Serving
Plaid Cymru	Donna Cushing	Sir Fynwy Torfaen	2026	present	Serving
Reform	Sarah Edwards	Sir Gaerfyrddin	2026	present	Serving
Plaid Cymru	Safa Elhassan	Gŵyr Abertawe	2026	present	Serving
Reform	Louise Emery	Clwyd	2026	present	Serving
Reform	Cristiana Emsley	Fflint Wrecsam	2026	present	Serving
Plaid Cymru	Sera Evans	Afan Ogwr Rhondda	2026	present	Serving
Plaid Cymru	Kerry Ferguson	Ceredigion Penfro	2026	present	Serving
Plaid Cymru	Leticia Gonzalez	Caerdydd Penarth	2026	present	Serving
Plaid Cymru	Carrie Harper	Fflint Wrecsam	2026	present	Serving
Reform	Helen Jenner	Bangor Conwy Môn	2026	present	Serving
Reform	Claire Johnson-Wood	Gwynedd Maldwyn	2026	present	Serving
Plaid Cymru	Kiera Marshall	Caerdydd Penarth	2026	present	Serving
Plaid Cymru	Becca Martin	Clwyd	2026	present	Serving
Plaid Cymru	Lis McLean	Pontypridd Cynon Merthyr	2026	present	Serving
Plaid Cymru	Anna Nicholl	Ceredigion Penfro	2026	present	Serving
Reform	Francesca O'Brien	Gŵyr Abertawe	2026	present	Serving
Plaid Cymru	Rebeca Phillips	Brycheiniog Tawe Nedd	2026	present	Serving
Plaid Cymru	Sarah Rees	Pen-y-bont Bro Morgannwg	2026	present	Serving
Plaid Cymru	Mair Rowlands	Bangor Conwy Môn	2026	present	Serving
Plaid Cymru	Niamh Salkeld	Blaenau Gwent Caerffili Rhymni	2026	present	Serving
Plaid Cymru	Elyn Stephens	Afan Ogwr Rhondda	2026	present	Serving
Labour	Shav Taj	Caerdydd Ffynnon Taf	2026	present	Serving

== Proportion of women in the Senedd ==
The Senedd (Welsh Parliament; Welsh: Senedd Cymru) has 60 seats. At each election the Senedd has returned some of the highest rates of female representation in the world. At the 2003 election 30 women and 30 men were elected. Following a by-election in 2006 there were 31 women and 29 men who all served until the 2007 election.

Following the May 2026 election there are 44 women and 52 men.

Date	Female	Male
1999 election	24	36
2000 (Note: Following the resignation of Alun Michael and the return of Delyth Evans on 1 May 2000)	25	35
2003 election	30	30
2006 (Note: Following the Blaenau Gwent by-election on 29 June 2006)	31	29
2007 election	28	32
2010 (Note: Following the resignation of Mike German and the return of Veronica German on 1 July 2010)	29	31
2011 election	25	35
2016 election	25	35
2017 (Note: Following the resignation of Nathan Gill and the return of Mandy Jones on 27 December 2017)	26	34
2018 (Note: Following the resignation of Simon Thomas on 26 July 2018 and return of Helen Mary Jones)	27	33
2019 (Note: Following the death of Steffan Lewis on 11 January 2019 and return of Delyth Jewell)	28	32
2020 (Note: Following the death of Mohammad Asghar on 16 June 2020 and return of Laura Anne Jones)	29	31
2021 election	26	34
2026 election	44	52
