= Frontbench team of Ken Skates =

Welsh Labour frontbench team in the Senedd (since 2026)

Frontbench Team of Ken Skates
- Welsh Labour Frontbench Team of the Senedd
- May 2026-present
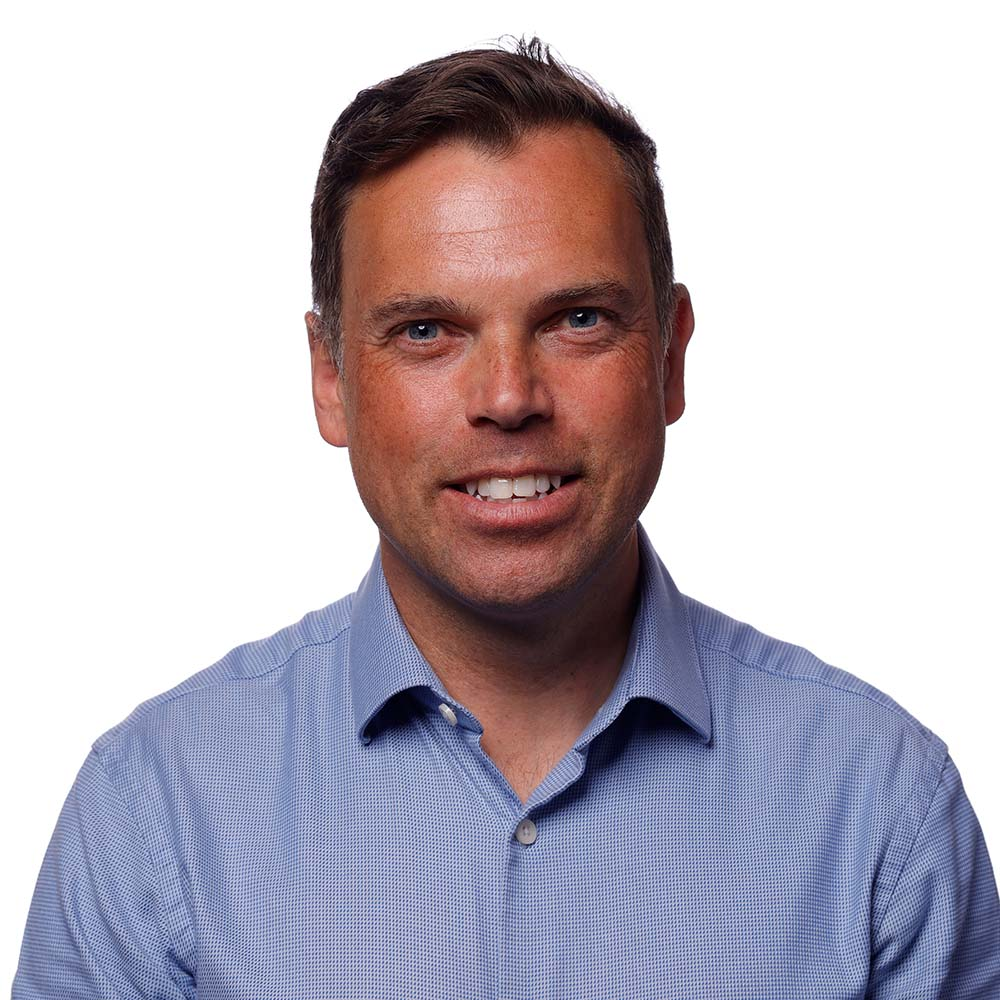
- Official portrait of Ken Skates, 2026
- Date established: 19 May 2026

Leadership and composition
- Leader: Ken Skates
- Member party: Welsh Labour
- Status in legislature: Opposition party 9 / 96 (9%)

Formation and history
- Legislature term: 7th Senedd

Following the 2026 Senedd election, Welsh Labour lost power in Wales for the first time since the beginning of Devolution and the outgoing First Minister of Wales Eluned Morgan lost her seat.

Following the election, Ken Skates was appointed interim leader of Welsh Labour and formed his frontbench team on the 19th May.

On the 15th July 2026, Skates was made permanent leader after receiving the full support of his group.

== History ==
Ken Skates formed his frontbench team on the 19th May 2026, which included all Labour Members of the Senedd except Huw Irranca-Davies, who had been made Llywydd, and Sarah Murphy who was on maternity leave.

On the 14th July 2026, the Labour group voted against the supplementary budget proposed by the ap Iorwerth government, over disagreements on additional learning needs spending and an ongoing dispute between the Government and Trade unions over teacher's pay. The budget failed to be passed after Reform UK Wales and the Welsh Conservatives also voted against it.

== Members ==
=== May 2026 to present ===
Portfolio	Spokesperson	Constituency
Party Spokespeople
Leader of Welsh Labour; Spokesperson for Health, Care and National Security	Ken Skates	Fflint Wrecsam
Spokesperson for Housing, Communities, Public and Preventative Health	Jayne Bryant	Casnewydd Islwyn
Trefnydd and Spokesperson for Children, Education, and Lifelong Learning	Lynne Neagle	Sir Fynwy Torfaen
Chief Whip and Spokesperson for Environment, Farming, Energy and Transport	Vikki Howells	Pontypridd Cynon Merthyr
Spokesperson for employment, equalities and Economic Transformation	Shavanah Taj	Caerdydd Ffynnon Taf
Spokesperson for Finance, Democracy, Citizenship, and Welsh Language	Huw Thomas	Caerdydd Penarth
Spokesperson for Culture, Sport, Local Government and Legislation	Mike Hedges	Gwyr Abertawe
