= Paul Rock (politician) =

Welsh politician (born 1966 or 1967)

Paul Rock MS
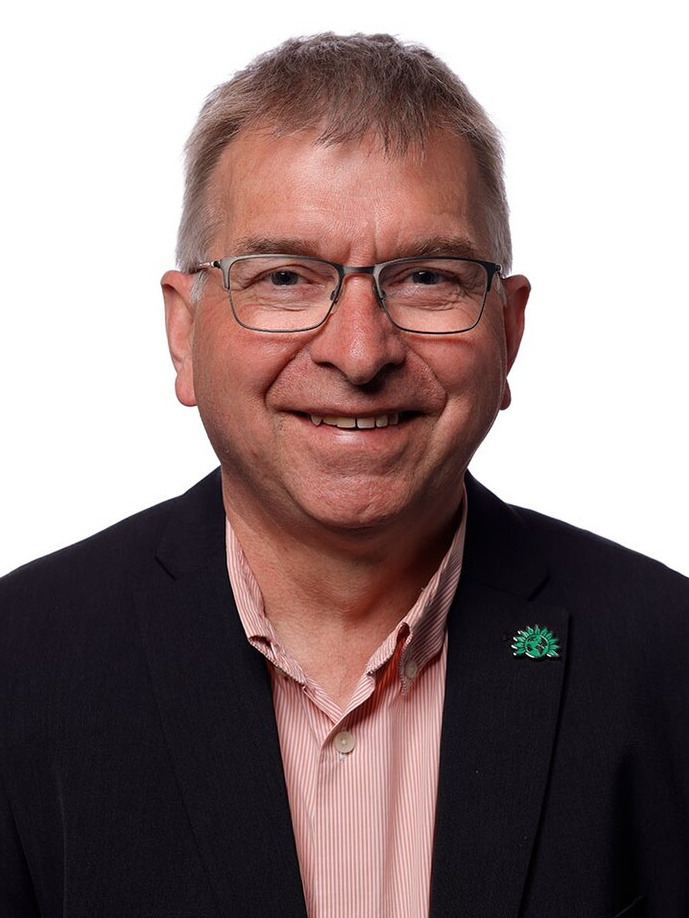
- Official portrait, 2026

Member of the Senedd
- Incumbent
- Assumed office 8 May 2026
- Constituency: Caerdydd Ffynnon Taf

Personal details
- Born: 1966 or 1967 (age 59–60) Bromley, Greater London, England
- Party: Wales Green Party
- Other political affiliations: Common Ground Alliance (2022)
- Education: Kingston University

Paul Rock (born 1966 or 1967) is a Welsh politician who has served as a member of the Senedd (MS) for Caerdydd Ffynnon Taf since May 2026. A member of the Wales Green Party, he is one of the first two Green MSs.

== Early life and career ==
Rock was born in Bromley, Greater London, England, in 1966 or 1967 to an English mother, an NHS nurse, and a Welsh father, who began working in the coal industry at the age of 13. He was raised in a Christian family in Skegness, Lincolnshire and attended Kingston University, where he studied physics. While at university, he developed an interest in information technology (IT) and has described himself as a member of the "ZX81 generation".

Following his graduation, Rock worked at Kingston University before moving to Llandaff North in Cardiff, Wales, in 1997. Rock has worked in IT for most of his career and, prior to the 2021 Senedd election, he became involved in local grassroots environmental campaigning and served as a school governor.

== Political career ==
In the 2022 Cardiff Council election, he stood as a Common Ground Alliance candidate (an electoral pact between the Greens and Plaid Cymru) for Llandaff North. He placed third, receiving 581 votes (12%), and was not elected.

In the 2026 Senedd election, Rock was elected as a Member of the Senedd (MS) for the six-member Caerdydd Ffynnon Taf constituency, with the party receiving 9,036 votes (10.2%). He was the Green Party's lead candidate for the constituency and became one of the first two Green MSs, alongside Anthony Slaughter, Leader of the Wales Green Party. Following the election, Rock and Slaughter nominated Leader of Plaid Cymru Rhun ap Iorwerth for appointment as First Minister of Wales.

In June 2026, Rock became a member of the Senedd Climate Change, Environment, Sustainability and Rural Affairs Committee, and a guest member of the Business Committee, which is responsible for deciding the dates of the Senedd recesses. Rock ruled himself out as a candidate for the 2026 Wales Green Party leadership election.

== Electoral history ==
Election	Seat	Party	Votes	Percentage (%)	Result	Source
Cardiff Council, 2022	Llandaff North	Common Ground Alliance	581	12	Not elected	
Senedd, 2026	Caerdydd Ffynnon Taf	Wales Green Party	9,036	10.2	Elected	

== Personal life ==
Rock is married. He is a Christian. In an interview with Cytûn, he described his faith as an "intrinsic part" of his upbringing and family. Rock has said that he became a member of the Wales Green Party after reading the party's manifesto and finding that its policies most closely aligned with his political positions and Christian values. He has referred to social justice and transport as issues of importance to him.

Rock commutes to the Senedd by bicycle via the Taff Trail, and after his election he had arrived at the Senedd by bicycle to take the oath as an MS. He has described himself as a train enthusiast. He has said that one of his favourite activities as an MS is showing students and schoolchildren around the Senedd.

== See also ==
- 7th Senedd
- List of Green Party of England and Wales politicians
