= 2026 Wales Green Party leadership election =

Election

- December 2026
Leader before election
Anthony Slaughter
Elected Leader
TBD

A leadership election for the Wales Green Party will take place in December 2026, to elect a successor for Anthony Slaughter.

== Background ==
In the 2026 Senedd election, the Wales Green Party elected their first two seats to the Senedd.

== Conduct ==
The election is scheduled for December 2026.

== Candidates ==
=== Announced ===
- Ian Chandler, member of Monmouthshire County Council.
- Debra Cooper, former teacher and member of Bridgend Green Party.

=== Declined ===
- Paul Rock, MS for Caerdydd Ffynnon Taf.
