= Cabinet Minister for Government Effectiveness and the Constitution =

Welsh Government cabinet minister (2021–2024)

Cabinet Minister for Government Effectiveness and the Constitution of Wales
- Gweinidog Cabinet dros Effeithiolrwydd Llywodraeth a’r Cyfansoddiad (Welsh)

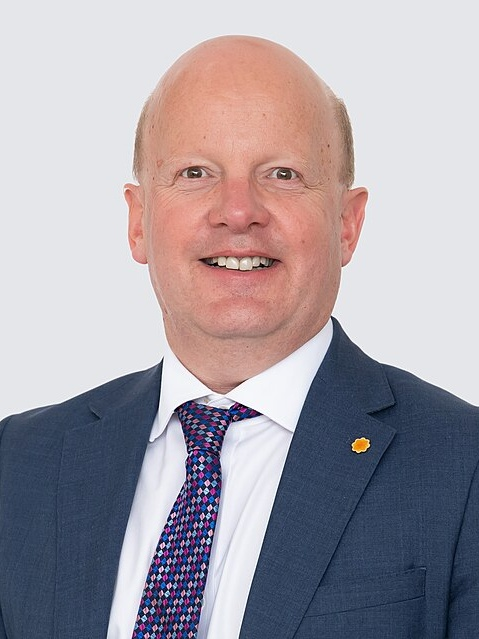
- Incumbent; Dafydd Trystan MS since 13 May 2026
- Welsh Government
- Style: Welsh Minister
- Status: Cabinet Minister
- Abbreviation: Minister
- Member of: Senedd; Cabinet
- Reports to: the Senedd and the First Minister of Wales
- Seat: Cardiff
- Nominator: First Minister of Wales
- Appointer: The Crown
- Term length: Four years; Subject to elections to the Senedd which take place every four years
- First holder: Mick Antoniw MS
- Salary: £124,713 (MS pay + £44,896 Welsh Minister pay)
- Website: www.gov.wales/dafydd-trystan-davies-ms

The Cabinet Minister for Government Effectiveness and the Constitution (Welsh: Gweinidog Cabinet dros Effeithiolrwydd Llywodraeth a’r Cyfansoddiad) is a member of the cabinet in the Welsh Government.

== Ministers ==
Name	Picture	Entered office	Left office	Other offices held	Political party	Government	Notes
Minister for the Constitution
Mick Antoniw		13 May 2021	20 March 2024	Counsel General	Labour	Second Drakeford government	
Cabinet Secretary for the Constitution
Rebecca Evans		21 March 2024	11 September 2024	Finance and Cabinet Office	Labour	Gething government Interim Eluned Morgan government	
Cabinet Minister for Government Effectiveness and the Constitution
Dafydd Trystan		13 May 2026	Incumbent		Plaid Cymru	ap Iorwerth government	

== Responsibilities ==
The post holder may have the following responsibilities:

- Constitutional affairs including Standing Commission on Wales' constitutional arrangements
- Oversight of the government's priorities
- Oversight of the Programme for Government
- Supporting oversight of Cabinet Office
- One Wales Public Service, including Academi Wales
- Planning for the Legislative programme
- Official Statistics, including the Census, social research and the national survey for Wales
- A review of Wales' Covid Response
- Implementation of the Well-being of Future Generations framework, including Well-being of Future Generations National Stakeholder Fora and oversight of relationship with Public Bodies under the WFG Act, and Sustainable Development Goals
- Public Service Boards
- Devolution of justice and policing

The responsibilities for this position are vague, since its establishment in May 2021, however the officeholder was on the receiving end of questions relating to Senedd reform, while also expressing the officeholder's opinion on the state of intergovernmental relations with the UK Government, such as the dispute over the Trade Union (Wales) Act 2017, and how UK Government laws impact Wales. The officeholder also commissioned reports on how local democracy works in Wales, and oversaw pilots on the issue.

The position was retired in September 2024 as a specific role by First Minister Eluned Morgan. The role's responsibilities were passed to other portfolios.

The role was added once again under the ap Iorwerth's administration, with government effectiveness being added to the role.

== See also ==
- Ministry
