= List of Green Party of England and Wales politicians =

The following is a list of Green Party of England and Wales politicians

== Houses of Parliament ==
=== House of Commons ===
- Siân Berry
- Carla Denyer
- Ellie Chowns
- Adrian Ramsay
- Hannah Spencer

=== House of Lords ===
- Natalie Bennett
- Jenny Jones

== Former Members of Parliament ==
- Caroline Lucas

== Members of the Senedd ==
- Anthony Slaughter
- Paul Rock

== Members of the London Assembly ==
- Zack Polanski
- Benali Hamdache
- Caroline Russell

== Directly elected Mayors ==
- Liam Shrivastava
- Zoë Garbett

== Notable councillors ==
- Mothin Ali
- Benali Hamdache
- Caroline Russell
- Rachel Millward
- Jamie Driscoll
- Florence Schechter
- Nicholas Blincoe

== Former Members of Parliament who joined the Greens ==
- Thelma Walker
- Lloyd Russell-Moyle
- Tony Clarke
- Lynne Jones
