= 2026 review of Senedd constituencies =

Boundary review in Wales for 2026

The 2026 review of Senedd constituencies was conducted between July 2024 and March 2025 by the Democracy and Boundary Commission Cymru. The Senedd Cymru (Members and Elections) Act 2024 legislated that the 2026 Senedd election should use 16 six-member constituencies under a party-list proportional representation system, replacing the existing 40 constituencies and five regions currently used for the Senedd (Welsh Parliament; Welsh: Senedd Cymru). The constituencies are required by the law to be contiguous pairings of the 32 UK Parliament constituencies used in Wales since the 2024 UK election. The commission were also required by the law to give constituencies a single name in both Welsh and English, unless it could be considered unacceptable for a single name. However, the commission eventually announced they are to all exclusively use Welsh.

== Background ==
The Senedd Cymru (Members and Elections) Act 2024, also nicknamed the "Senedd Reform Act", was introduced to the Senedd on 18 September 2023, and received royal assent on 24 June 2024. It was the culmination of various proposals for reforming the Senedd, particularly the increase in the numbers of members of the Senedd, and changing the existing voting system.

As part of the 2021 co-operation agreement between Welsh Labour and Plaid Cymru, the parties agreed on an expansion of the Senedd to between 80 and 100 Members and a more proportional voting method. Leaders of the two parties announced in a May 2022 joint position statement calling for a 96-Member Senedd, all elected through closed party list proportional representation (using the D'Hondt method), as well as "zipping" of male and female candidates, so at least 50% of those on lists are women, but the zipping proposal was later postponed in 2023.

The 2024 act renamed the Local Democracy and Boundary Commission for Wales to the "Democracy and Boundary Commission Cymru", and gave it the responsibility to conduct boundary reviews of the Senedd constituencies for both the 2026 and 2030 Senedd elections, and regular boundary reviews thereafter.

Following the reduction in the number of Welsh MPs and the implementation of new constituency boundaries for the 2024 UK general election, the proposals and subsequently the 2024 act, required the new Senedd constituencies to be contiguous pairings of the 32 UK Parliament constituencies used in Wales since the 2024 UK election. Therefore there would be 16 constituencies, electing six members each, to replace the existing 40 constituencies and five regions. The commission was also required by the law to give constituencies a single name in both Welsh and English, unless it could be considered unacceptable for a single name. The commission later decided all the new constituencies were to use Welsh-only names.

The review began in July 2024. The 2026 review was time-constricted, therefore the subsequent 2030 review, the first full boundary review in 18 years, would provide the commission with more flexibility.

== Initial proposals (September 2024) ==
The Democracy and Boundary Commission Cymru revealed its initial proposals for the proposed new constituencies in September 2024, following the commencement of the review in July 2024.

Map of the 16 constituencies in the commission's initial proposals.

Initial proposed Senedd constituency	UK Parliament constituencies
Bangor Aberconwy Ynys Môn	Bangor Aberconwy
Bangor Aberconwy Ynys Môn	Ynys Môn
Clwyd	Clwyd East
Clwyd	Clwyd North
Alyn, Deeside and Wrexham	Alyn and Deeside
Alyn, Deeside and Wrexham	Wrexham
Dwyfor Meirionnydd, Montgomeryshire and Glyndŵr	Dwyfor Meirionnydd
Dwyfor Meirionnydd, Montgomeryshire and Glyndŵr	Montgomeryshire and Glyndŵr
Ceredigion and Pembrokeshire	Ceredigion Preseli
Ceredigion and Pembrokeshire	Mid and South Pembrokeshire
Carmarthenshire	Caerfyrddin
Carmarthenshire	Llanelli
Swansea West and Gower	Swansea West
Swansea West and Gower	Gower
Brecon, Radnor, Neath and Swansea East	Brecon, Radnor and Cwm Tawe
Brecon, Radnor, Neath and Swansea East	Neath and Swansea East
Aberafan Maesteg, Rhondda and Ogmore	Aberafan Maesteg
Aberafan Maesteg, Rhondda and Ogmore	Rhondda and Ogmore
Merthyr Tydfil, Aberdare and Pontypridd	Merthyr Tydfil and Aberdare
Merthyr Tydfil, Aberdare and Pontypridd	Pontypridd
Blaenau Gwent, Rhymney and Caerphilly	Blaenau Gwent and Rhymney
Blaenau Gwent, Rhymney and Caerphilly	Caerphilly
Monmouthshire and Torfaen	Monmouthshire
Monmouthshire and Torfaen	Torfaen
Newport and Islwyn	Newport East
Newport and Islwyn	Newport West and Islwyn
Cardiff East and North	Cardiff East
Cardiff East and North	Cardiff North
Cardiff West, South and Penarth	Cardiff West
Cardiff West, South and Penarth	Cardiff South and Penarth
Vale of Glamorgan and Bridgend	Vale of Glamorgan
Vale of Glamorgan and Bridgend	Bridgend

== Revised proposals (December 2024) ==
In December 2024, the commission published its revised proposals following a consultation. The two major changes were the switching of the Cardiff constituencies into different pairs, and the announcement that all (except four) of the constituencies will have Welsh-language names only, not having English-language names.

The decision for only Welsh-language names received support from Cymdeithas yr Iaith, but the society called for the remaining four English names to be removed as well. They further suggested cutting the compass directions from the excepted names if needed for them to be Welsh-only. While Andrew RT Davies, former leader of the Welsh Conservatives, called the decision a "disenfranchise[ment]" of English-language only speakers, and called for constituencies covering English-speaking majority areas to have English-language names as well. The commission was required by law to give constituencies a single name for use in both languages, unless it was considered unacceptable. With four constituencies having bilingual names in the revised proposals.

Map of the revised proposal of the 16 new Senedd constituencies, in December 2024. The final map, released three months later, would have some constituencies named differently and different boundaries in Cardiff.

Revised proposed Senedd constituency	UK Parliament constituencies
Afan Ogwr Rhondda	Aberafan Maesteg
Afan Ogwr Rhondda	Rhondda and Ogmore; Rhondda ac Ogwr (Welsh)
Bangor Conwy Môn	Bangor Aberconwy
Bangor Conwy Môn	Ynys Môn
Blaenau Gwent Caerffili Rhymni	Blaenau Gwent and Rhymney; Blaenau Gwent a Rhymni (Welsh)
Blaenau Gwent Caerffili Rhymni	Caerphilly; Caerffili (Welsh)
Gogledd-orllewin Caerdydd; Cardiff North-west (English)	Cardiff North; Gogledd Caerdydd (Welsh)
Gogledd-orllewin Caerdydd; Cardiff North-west (English)	Cardiff West; Gorllewin Caerdydd (Welsh)
De-ddwyrain Caerdydd Penarth; Cardiff South-east Penarth (English)	Cardiff East; Dwyrain Caerdydd (Welsh)
De-ddwyrain Caerdydd Penarth; Cardiff South-east Penarth (English)	Cardiff South and Penarth; De Caerdydd a Phenarth (Welsh)
Casnewydd Islwyn	Newport East; Dwyrain Casnewydd (Welsh)
Casnewydd Islwyn	Newport West and Islwyn; Gorllewin Casnewydd ac Islwyn (Welsh)
Ceredigion Penfro	Ceredigion Preseli
Ceredigion Penfro	Mid and South Pembrokeshire; Canol a De Sir Benfro (Welsh)
Clwyd	Clwyd East
Clwyd	Clwyd North
Fflint Wrecsam	Alyn and Deeside
Fflint Wrecsam	Wrexham; Wrecsam (Welsh)
Gwynedd Maldwyn	Dwyfor Meirionnydd
Gwynedd Maldwyn	Montgomeryshire and Glyndŵr; Maldwyn a Glyndŵr (Welsh)
Sir Gâr	Caerfyrddin
Sir Gâr	Llanelli
De Powys Tawe Nedd; South Powys Tawe Neath (English)	Brecon, Radnor and Cwm Tawe
De Powys Tawe Nedd; South Powys Tawe Neath (English)	Neath and Swansea East; Castell Nedd a Dwyrain Abertawe (Welsh)
Gorllewin Abertawe Gŵyr; Swansea West Gower (English)	Swansea West; Gorllewin Abertawe (Welsh)
Gorllewin Abertawe Gŵyr; Swansea West Gower (English)	Gower; Gŵyr (Welsh)
Merthyr Cynon Taf	Merthyr Tydfil and Aberdare
Merthyr Cynon Taf	Pontypridd
Mynwy Torfaen	Monmouthshire; Sir Fynwy (Welsh)
Mynwy Torfaen	Torfaen
Pen-y-bont Bro Morgannwg	Vale of Glamorgan; Bro Morgannwg (Welsh)
Pen-y-bont Bro Morgannwg	Bridgend; Pen-y-bont ar Ogwr (Welsh)

== Final proposals (March 2025) ==
In March 2025, the commission published its final determinations, for the 16 constituencies, with the only change in boundaries being to revert the two Cardiff constituencies back to the pairing of the initial proposals, Cardiff North–Cardiff East and Cardiff West–Cardiff South and Penarth, creating Caerdydd Ffynnon Taf and Caerdydd Penarth respectively.

By law, the Senedd must put these final determinations into effect for the 2026 Senedd election without alteration. The commission is to conduct another full boundary review of Senedd constituencies following the 2026 election and the first in 18 years, for the subsequent Senedd election scheduled for 2030.

Labelled map of the 16 new Senedd constituencies.

Senedd constituency	UK parliament constituencies
Afan Ogwr Rhondda	Aberafan Maesteg
Afan Ogwr Rhondda	Rhondda and Ogmore; Rhondda ac Ogwr (Welsh)
Bangor Conwy Môn	Bangor Aberconwy
Bangor Conwy Môn	Ynys Môn
Blaenau Gwent Caerffili Rhymni	Blaenau Gwent and Rhymney; Blaenau Gwent a Rhymni (Welsh)
Blaenau Gwent Caerffili Rhymni	Caerphilly; Caerffili (Welsh)
Caerdydd Ffynnon Taf	Cardiff North; Gogledd Caerdydd (Welsh)
Caerdydd Ffynnon Taf	Cardiff East Dwyrain Caerdydd (Welsh)
Caerdydd Penarth	Cardiff West; Gorllewin Caerdydd (Welsh)
Caerdydd Penarth	Cardiff South and Penarth; De Caerdydd a Phenarth (Welsh)
Casnewydd Islwyn	Newport East; Dwyrain Casnewydd (Welsh)
Casnewydd Islwyn	Newport West and Islwyn; Gorllewin Casnewydd ac Islwyn (Welsh)
Ceredigion Penfro	Ceredigion Preseli
Ceredigion Penfro	Mid and South Pembrokeshire; Canol a De Sir Benfro (Welsh)
Clwyd	Clwyd East
Clwyd	Clwyd North
Fflint Wrecsam	Alyn and Deeside
Fflint Wrecsam	Wrexham; Wrecsam (Welsh)
Gwynedd Maldwyn	Dwyfor Meirionnydd
Gwynedd Maldwyn	Montgomeryshire and Glyndŵr; Maldwyn a Glyndŵr (Welsh)
Sir Gaerfyrddin	Caerfyrddin
Sir Gaerfyrddin	Llanelli
Brycheiniog Tawe Nedd	Brecon, Radnor and Cwm Tawe
Brycheiniog Tawe Nedd	Neath and Swansea East; Castell Nedd a Dwyrain Abertawe (Welsh)
Gŵyr Abertawe	Swansea West; Gorllewin Abertawe (Welsh)
Gŵyr Abertawe	Gower; Gŵyr (Welsh)
Pontypridd Cynon Merthyr	Merthyr Tydfil and Aberdare
Pontypridd Cynon Merthyr	Pontypridd
Sir Fynwy Torfaen	Monmouthshire; Sir Fynwy (Welsh)
Sir Fynwy Torfaen	Torfaen
Pen-y-bont Bro Morgannwg	Vale of Glamorgan; Bro Morgannwg (Welsh)
Pen-y-bont Bro Morgannwg	Bridgend; Pen-y-bont ar Ogwr (Welsh)

=== Welsh-only names ===
In the final proposals, several constituency names were changed, giving all of them a single Welsh-only name, including the remaining four which had been bilingual in the revised proposals. This met the conditions set in law that the constituencies must have a single name for use in Welsh and English, unless it was considered unacceptable.

The use of all Welsh-only names prompted a re-iteration of support from Cymdeithas yr Iaith chairman Joseff Gnagbo, who stated the move to be an "important precedent" for any future constituencies to also have Welsh-only names and for Welsh-only names to be used in other contexts as well. While the move received condemnation from former Welsh Conservative leader Andrew RT Davies stating that respondents to the commission's consultation mentioned that it "disenfranchised them", commenting that "they were ignored", and that "Wales is bilingual and constituency names should be in both languages". Other Conservative MSs from Powys claimed the larger constituencies means the link between representatives and constituents "will be lost" and criticised the loss of "Radnorshire" from the map.

The commission stated the Welsh-only names were "acceptable and recognisable for people across Wales". Shreen Williams, the head of the commission, stated that the move prompted a "pushback", but backed it stating that the opposition they received was "primarily [...] anti-Welsh sentiment", which was "incredibly disappointing". The final consultation had over 4,000 responses and was described by the commission to have received more responses then any other consultation "by a considerable margin".

In March 2026, Reform UK revealed their candidates for the 2026 election but did not use the Welsh-only names for the new constituencies. Instead they used the names of the UK Parliament constituencies, used in English, that the Senedd constituencies are pairings of. For example, instead of Brycheiniog Tawe Nedd, "Brecon, Radnor and Cwm Tawe, Neath and Swansea East" was used by the party.
