= Gwenllian Lansdown =

Welsh former politician (born 1979)

Gwenllian Lansdown-Davies

Personal details
- Born: 1979 (age 46–47) St Asaph, Wales
- Party: Plaid Cymru

Gwenllian Lansdown Davies (born 1979) is a former Welsh Plaid Cymru politician, a former County Councillor for Riverside, and Chief Executive of Plaid Cymru between 2007 and 2011. She was previously the Chief Executive of Mudiad Ysgolion Meithrin (the "Nursery Schools Movement"). Since 2025 she is the Chief Executive of Dysgu.

== Background ==
Lansdown-Davies was born in St Asaph, grew up in Bangor, Gwynedd and was educated at St Hilda's College, Oxford, where she was an exhibitioner. In 2001, she was awarded her BA (Hons) in Modern Languages (French and Spanish). She later studied at Cardiff University for a Master of Sciences in economics and later a PhD in Political Theory researching liberalism, communitarianism and multiculturalism. Her title of her PhD was 'From Community to Pluralism: Liberalism and Nationalism in Wales'. She worked as a tutor in Politics during research for her PhD.

She has 4 children and lives in Llanerfyl, Powys.

== Political career ==
Vice-President of Union whilst at College and Chair of Plaid Cymru Student Federation in 2003, Lansdown's political interests include community development, international relations and the environment.

Lansdown was elected as County Borough Councillor on the Cardiff County Council on 10 June 2004, for the Riverside Electoral Division. The Riverside electoral division has an electorate of 9,513 (1 December 2005) and has 3 seats. She stood as number 3 on the Plaid Cymru regional list for South Wales Central at the 2007 National Assembly for Wales election.

Lansdown was Chief Executive of Plaid Cymru between September 2007, replacing Dr Dafydd Trystan, and June 2011, when Rhuanedd Richards was appointed to the role.

== Education career ==
After the 2011 'Yes for Wales' referendum campaign, she resigned as Chief Executive of Plaid Cymru and as County Councillor for Riverside in order to move to Montgomeryshire with her new husband. She worked as Assistant Editor for the Welsh-language academic journal, Gwerddon and as Publications Officer at Coleg Cymraeg Cenedlaethol in Aberystwyth University.

Between 2014 and 2025, Gwenllian Lansdown Davies was the Chief Executive of Mudiad Meithrin, which provide Welsh-medium childcare and early years provision and also delivers several Welsh-government funded projects relating to the transfer and use of the Welsh language in families. She sits on various government-sponsored committees in a number of policy fields. In 2019, she joined the Board of Trustees at the National Library of Wales. She also serves as Responsible Individual at her local Cylch Meithrin in a voluntary capacity.

In 2025 she was appointed as Chief Executive of Dysgu, a new professional learning and leadership body in the education sector.

Party political offices
Preceded by John Dixon	Chair of Plaid Cymru; 2009–2010	Succeeded by Ellen ap Gwynn
Preceded by Dafydd Trystan	Chief Executive of Plaid Cymru; 2007–2011	Succeeded by Rhuanedd Richards
