= Wales Co-operative Centre =

UK co-operative development body

Wales Co-operative Centre is a non-profit co-operative development agency in Wales. It is the largest co-operative development body in the UK, managing several major initiatives in Wales.

It delivers a range of projects to promote social, financial inclusion, and digital inclusion. Its team of advisors work across the country, helping co-operatives, social enterprises, community groups and voluntary organisations.

The Centre was originally an industrial and provident society, which in 2014 became a community benefit society. It is funded through the Welsh Government, Europe, some local authorities and some earned income. The Centre has over 80 staff members working across Wales at offices in Caerphilly, Bangor, Carmarthen and Swansea, including its head office in the Y Borth building. Its membership elect a management board, who appoint the executive committee.

== History ==
=== 1980s ===
The Centre was established in 1982 by the Wales TUC to provide business support to co-operatives in Wales. Two years later the Centre published the first list of co-operatives in Wales and launched its first programme of training courses. It helped establish the first credit union in Wales in Rhydfelin (now called Dragonsavers) in 1988, and also began providing advice to trade unions and their members about employee ownership.

=== 1990s ===
In 1992 the Wales Co-operative Centre was the largest co-operative development agency in England and Wales. (As of 2018 the UK's largest co-operatives included John Lewis Partnership and the Co-operative Group.) The Centre's support helped Tower Colliery to become the largest employee-owned company in the country in 1995. The Centre also helped to set up the UK's first credit union based on an NHS Trust, in Bridgend. In 1998 the Centre took over the Enterprise Rehearsal Project which helped benefit claimants into self-employment (examples). It began working with social enterprises in Wales in 1999 and became the first Chair of the All Wales Social Enterprise Network.

=== 2000s ===
The Wales Co-operative Centre gained support from the Welsh Assembly Government in 2000 for a significant credit union development and grant fund initiative, which then became a flagship project under the new European structural funds Programme. In 2001, the Wales Co-operative Centre brought together the Communities First Support Network to support the work of the Communities First Programme. The Coalfields Regeneration Trust provided further funding in 2002 for the Centre to administer the Debt Redemption and Money Advice Scheme to protect those most at risk from doorstep lenders. In 2004 it secured European Objective One funding to continue work in developing co-operatives and that led to a major expansion of the Centre. The Welsh Assembly Government's 'Social Enterprise Strategy for Wales' formally recognised the role which social enterprises and co-operatives play in economic development in 2005. Communities@One was launched by the Communities Directorate of the Welsh Assembly Government in 2006, and the Wales Co-operative Centre won the contract to deliver this digital inclusion initiative. 2007 saw the Centre launch a Fair Trade project working with businesses across Wales to show them the benefits of adopting a fair trade policy, following funding from the Welsh Assembly Government. In 2009, the Centre won contracts to deliver the Social Enterprise Support Project and the Welsh Assembly Government's digital inclusion project, Communities 2.0.

=== 2010s ===
2010 saw a change of Chief Executive. After a total of 18 years with the Centre, Simon Harris left to become Director of Wales at Business in the Community. He was replaced by Derek Walker, coming from Director of External Affairs at the Big Lottery Fund. In 2015, the Centre began delivery of the Social Business Wales project which provides online and face-to-face support to social businesses seeking to expand and increase employment. It also won the contract to deliver Digital Communities Wales, the Welsh Government's digital inclusion programme to get people in Wales online. 2016 saw the start of two new projects, Care to Co-operate (which supports the development of social care and well-being co-ops) and Community Shares Wales, which helps communities raise investment to save or create amenities and services.
