= List of committees of the Senedd =

List of committees of the Senedd is a list of departmental, standing and ad hoc committees of the Senedd.

== List of committees from 2026 ==
Committee chairs were selected on 17 June 2026.

Committee	Chair		Responsibility
Committee	Name	Since	Responsibility
Business Committee	Huw Irranca-Davies	2026	
Early Years, Children, Young People and Education Committee	Sera Evans	2026	
Health and Social Care Committee	Jayne Bryant	2026	
Climate Change, Environment, Sustainability and Rural Affairs Committee	James Evans	2026	
Equality, Human Rights and Social Justice Committee	Zaynub Akbar	2026	
Economy, Energy and Connectivity Committee	Elwyn Vaughan	2026	
Culture, Communications, Cymraeg and Sport Committee	Mair Rowlands and Lis McLean	2026	
Local Government, Housing and Planning Committee	Carmelo Colasanto	2026	
Constitution, Justice and External Affairs Committee	Carrie Harper	2026	
Finance Committee	Sam Rowlands	2026	
Public Accounts and Public Administration Committee	Andrew Griffin	2026	
Legislation Committee	Sarah Cooper-Lesadd	2026	
Standards of Conduct Committee	Lindsay Whittle	2026	
Petitions Committee	Jason O'Connell	2026	

== Prior to 2026 ==
=== Departmental committees ===
- Children, Young People and Education
- Climate Change, Environment, and Infrastructure
- Scrutiny of the First Minister
- Culture, Communications, Welsh Language, Sport, and International Relations
- Economy, Trade, and Rural Affairs
- Finance
- Health and Social Care
- Local Government and Housing

=== Standing committees ===
- the Whole Senedd
- Equality and Social Justice Committee
- Legislation, Justice and Constitution Committee
- Committee on Procedures
- Business Committee
- Llywydd's Committee
- Public Accounts Committee
- Petitions Committee
- Audit Committee
- Standards of Conduct Committee

=== Special committees ===
- Reform Bill Committee
- Wales COVID-19 Inquiry Special Purpose Committee

== See also ==
- Welsh Government sponsored body
