= Wales TUC =

Trade union co-ordinating body in Wales

Wales TUC Cymru
- Wales TUC Cymru
- Founded: 1974
- Headquarters: Cardiff, Wales
- Location: Wales
- Members: ~ 400,000
- Key people: Laura Doel, general secretary
- Affiliations: TUC
- Website: Wales TUC

The Wales TUC (Welsh: TUC Cymru) is the co-ordinating body of trade unions in Wales. With 48 affiliated unions as of 2021, the Wales TUC represents nearly 400,000 workers.

== Activities ==
The Wales TUC is an integral part of the Trades Union Congress (TUC) of England and Wales, and was set up to ensure that the role of the TUC is effectively undertaken in Wales. The Wales TUC aims to work with, and make representations to, other Welsh organisations. A major role is to co-ordinate the trade union approach to the Welsh Government and ensure that the interests of Welsh trade unionists are properly represented in the whole range of Senedd decision making. Wales TUC has responsibility over devolved matters in Wales. The General Secretary of the Wales TUC is Shavanah Taj (2021), who is based in the Cardiff office. Wales TUC develops policy on all devolved matters and others specific to Wales. Its General Council also oversees the implementation of UK wide or International matters agreed by the TUC's General Council.

The Wales TUC supports trade union reps in Wales through training and information on issues such as health & safety, workplace rights, learning at work, equalities climate change and just transition.

== History ==
In 1982, The Wales TUC established the Wales Co-operative Centre to provide business support to co-operatives and to help redundant workers during the 1980s recession. The Centre is now the largest co-operative development body in the UK.

== Leadership ==
=== General Secretaries ===
1974: George Wright
1984: David Jenkins
2004: Felicity Williams
2008: Martin Mansfield
2020: Shavanah Taj
2026: Laura Doel

=== Presidents ===
Year	President	Union
1974	Len Murray	Trades Union Congress
1974	Dai Francis	National Union of Mineworkers
1975	W. John Jones	Union of Shop, Distributive and Allied Workers
1976	D. Ivor Davies	Mid Glamorgan Trades Councils
1977	Glyn Phillips	National and Local Government Officers' Association
1978	Archie Kirkwood	National Union of Railwaymen
1979	Sylvia Jones	Mid Glamorgan Trades Councils
1980	John Griffiths	Transport and General Workers' Union
1981	Les Paul	Inland Revenue Staff Federation
1982	Jim Morris	Clwyd Trades Councils
1983	Harry Harris	GMB
1984	Bryn Davies	Transport and General Workers' Union
1985	Jim Ryan	West Glamorgan Trades Councils
1986	Lyn Tregonning	Transport and General Workers' Union
1987	Ian Spence	GMB
1988	Elwyn Morgan	Mid Glamorgan Trades Councils
1989	George Wright	Transport and General Workers' Union
1990	Idris Jones	National and Local Government Officers' Association
1991	Kevin Crowley	Inland Revenue Staff Federation
1992	Bob Hart	National Union of Civil and Public Servants
1993	Brian John	West Glamorgan Trades Councils
1994	Pat Phillips	Union of Shop, Distributive and Allied Workers
1995	Allan Garley	GMB
1996	David White	Unison
1997	Edwina Hart	Banking, Insurance and Finance Union
1998	Denise Carter	Wrexham Trades Union Council
1999	Alwyn Rowlands	Amalgamated Engineering and Electrical Union
2000	Derek Gregory	Unison
2001	Jim Hancock	Transport and General Workers' Union
2002	Brian Curtis	National Union of Rail, Maritime and Transport Workers
2003	Ted Jenks	Conwy Trades Council
2004	Margaret Hazell	Amicus
2005	David Lewis	Amicus
2006	John Burgham	Transport and General Workers' Union
2007	Ruth Jones	Chartered Society of Physiotherapy
2008	Vaughan Gething	GMB
2009	Paul O'Shea	Unison
2010	Sian Wiblin	Public and Commercial Services Union
2011	Andy Richards	Unite
2011	Amarjite Singh	Communication Workers' Union
2013	David Evans	National Union of Teachers
2015	Margaret Thomas	Unison
2016	Mike Jenkins	Unite
2018	Shavanah Taj	Public and Commercial Services Union
2019	Ruth Brady	GMB
