= Jo Stevens =

British politician (born 1966)

The Right Honourable Jo Stevens MP
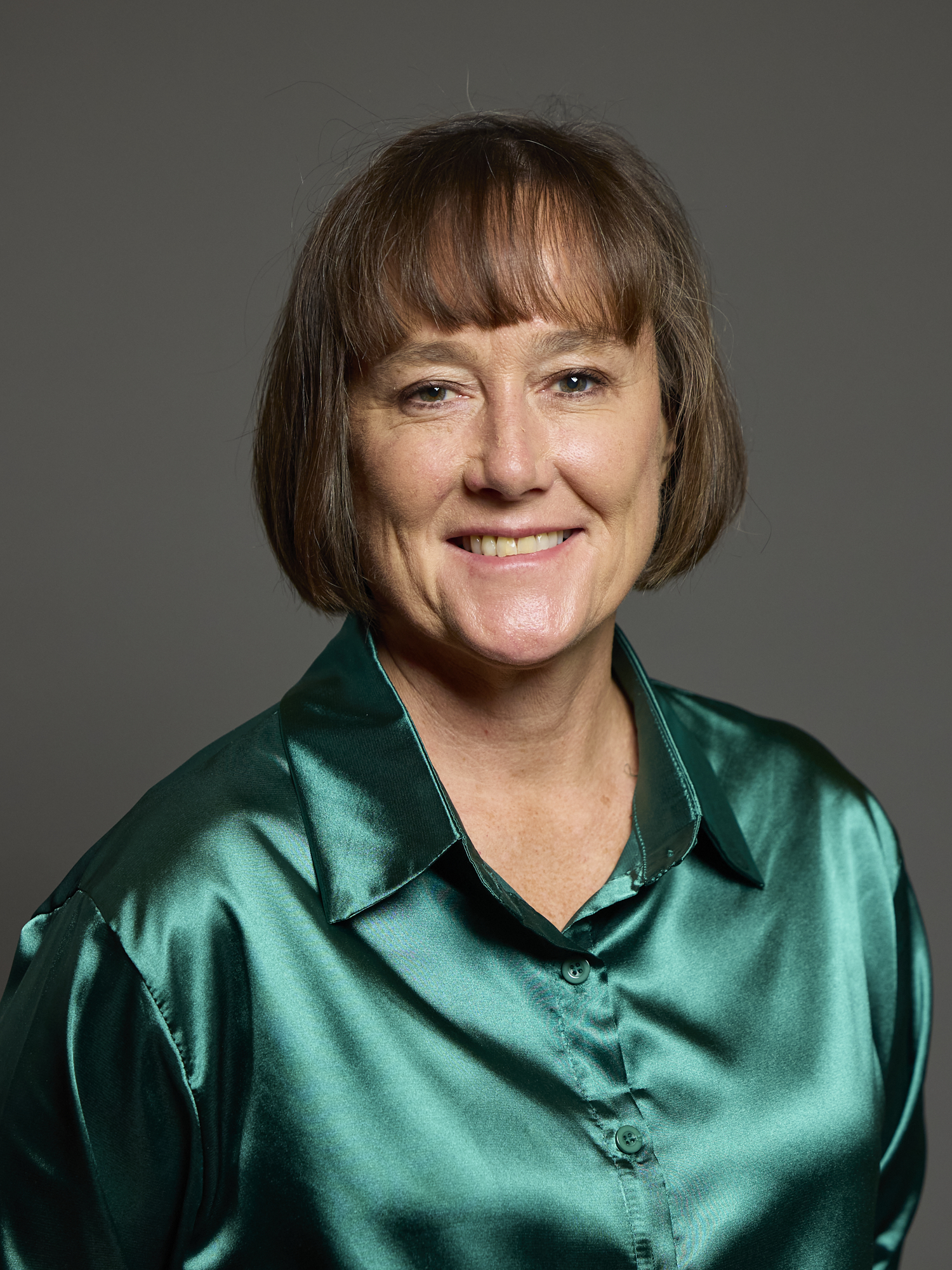
- Official portrait, 2024

Secretary of State for Wales
- In office 5 July 2024 – 20 July 2026
- Prime Minister: Keir Starmer
- Preceded by: David TC Davies
- Succeeded by: Stephen Kinnock
Shadow portfolios
Shadow Secretary of State for Wales
In office 29 November 2021 – 5 July 2024
Leader	Keir Starmer
Preceded by	Nia Griffith
Succeeded by	The Lord Davies of Gower
In office 7 October 2016 – 27 January 2017
Leader	Jeremy Corbyn
Preceded by	Paul Flynn
Succeeded by	Christina Rees
Shadow Secretary of State for Culture, Media and Sport
In office 6 April 2020 – 29 November 2021
Leader	Keir Starmer
Preceded by	Tracy Brabin
Succeeded by	Lucy Powell
Shadow Solicitor General for England and Wales
In office 13 January 2016 – 6 October 2016
Leader	Jeremy Corbyn
Preceded by	Karl Turner
Succeeded by	Nick Thomas-Symonds

Member of Parliament for Cardiff East Cardiff Central (2015–2024)
- Incumbent
- Assumed office 7 May 2015
- Preceded by: Jenny Willott
- Majority: 9,097 (23.3%)

Personal details
- Born: Joanna Meriel Stevens; 6 September 1966 (age 60) Swansea, Wales
- Party: Labour
- Education: University of Manchester; Manchester Metropolitan; University
- Website: www.jostevens.co.uk

Joanna Meriel Stevens (born 6 September 1966) is a Welsh politician who served as Secretary of State for Wales from 2024 to July 2026. A member of the Labour Party, she has been a Member of Parliament (MP) since 2015, representing Cardiff East since 2024, having previously represented Cardiff Central.

Stevens previously served as Shadow Secretary of State for Wales from 2016 to 2017, and again from 2021 to 2024, and was Shadow Secretary of State for Digital, Culture, Media and Sport from 2020 to 2021.

== Early life and career ==
Stevens was born in Swansea, West Glamorgan, Wales and grew up in Mynydd Isa, Flintshire, where she attended Argoed High School and Elfed High School.

She studied law at Manchester University and completed the Solicitors' Professional Examination at Manchester Polytechnic in 1989.

Before becoming an MP, Stevens was People and Organisation Director of Thompsons Solicitors.

== Member of Parliament ==
Stevens was elected as MP for Cardiff Central on 7 May 2015 with a majority of 4,981, defeating incumbent Liberal Democrat MP Jenny Willott.

In 2014 she accused her then Liberal Democrat opponent Jenny Willott of having "neglected her constituency" by taking a ministerial role. In a 2015 interview Stevens said that, if elected, she would be "happy as a backbench MP" adding she was "not a professional politician." Stevens later went on to serve in the shadow cabinets of Jeremy Corbyn and Keir Starmer.

In Jeremy Corbyn's January 2016 reshuffle, she was appointed shadow solicitor general and shadow justice minister. She supported Owen Smith in the 2016 Labour leadership election. In the October 2016 reshuffle, following Corbyn's re-election as party leader, Stevens became Shadow Secretary of State for Wales. An opponent of Brexit, she resigned as a shadow minister on 27 January 2017 in order to vote against triggering Article 50 of the Treaty on European Union, in defiance of a three-line whip that obliged Labour MPs to vote in favour. In March 2019, Stevens voted against the Labour Party whip and in favour of an amendment tabled by members of The Independent Group for a second public vote on Brexit.

Stevens chairs the GMB parliamentary group, which ensures that issues of importance to members of the GMB trade union are raised in the House of Commons.

Stevens supported Keir Starmer in the 2020 Labour leadership election. He subsequently appointed her Shadow Secretary of State for Culture, Media and Sport, shadowing Oliver Dowden. On 29 November 2021, she was reshuffled back to the position of Shadow Secretary of State for Wales by Keir Starmer.

In 2023, Stevens' office was defaced by protestors after she abstained on a motion calling for a ceasefire in Gaza. She described the incident as 'intimidating'.

In the 2024 general election, she was selected to contest the new Cardiff East constituency, after Cardiff Central was abolished. She won the seat, with a majority of 9,097 votes. Stevens was appointed Secretary of State for Wales in the first cabinet of Keir Starmer following the 2024 election.

Stevens was sworn of the Privy Council on 10 July 2024, entitling her to be styled "The Right Honourable" for life.

On 20 July 2026, Stevens was dismissed by Andy Burnham.

== Political positions ==
Stevens is a unionist. She has opposed devolution of policing and justice, of legal gender recognition, and full devolution of the post-Brexit Shared Prosperity Fund to the Senedd. Lee Waters described her as the "most anti-devolution Labour Welsh secretary we've had since George Thomas."

She opposed Brexit, describing herself as a "passionate European" in 2017. She has called for the introduction of legislation penalising social media companies that fail to tackle disinformation. She has supported introducing automatic voter registration upon receiving a national insurance number and lowering of the voting age to 16.

Parliament of the United Kingdom
Preceded by Jenny Willott	Member of Parliament for Cardiff Central; 2015–2024	Constituency abolished
New constituency	Member of Parliament for Cardiff East; 2024–present	Incumbent
Political offices
Preceded by Karl Turner	Shadow Solicitor General for England and Wales; 2016	Succeeded by Nick Thomas-Symonds
Preceded by Paul Flynn	Shadow Secretary of State for Wales; 2016–2017	Succeeded by Christina Rees
Preceded by Tracy Brabin	Shadow Secretary of State for Culture, Media and Sport; 2020–2021	Succeeded by Lucy Powell
Preceded by Nia Griffith	Shadow Secretary of State for Wales; 2021–2024	Succeeded by Byron Davies
Preceded by David TC Davies	Secretary of State for Wales; 2024–2026	Succeeded by Stephen Kinnock
