= Wales for Europe =

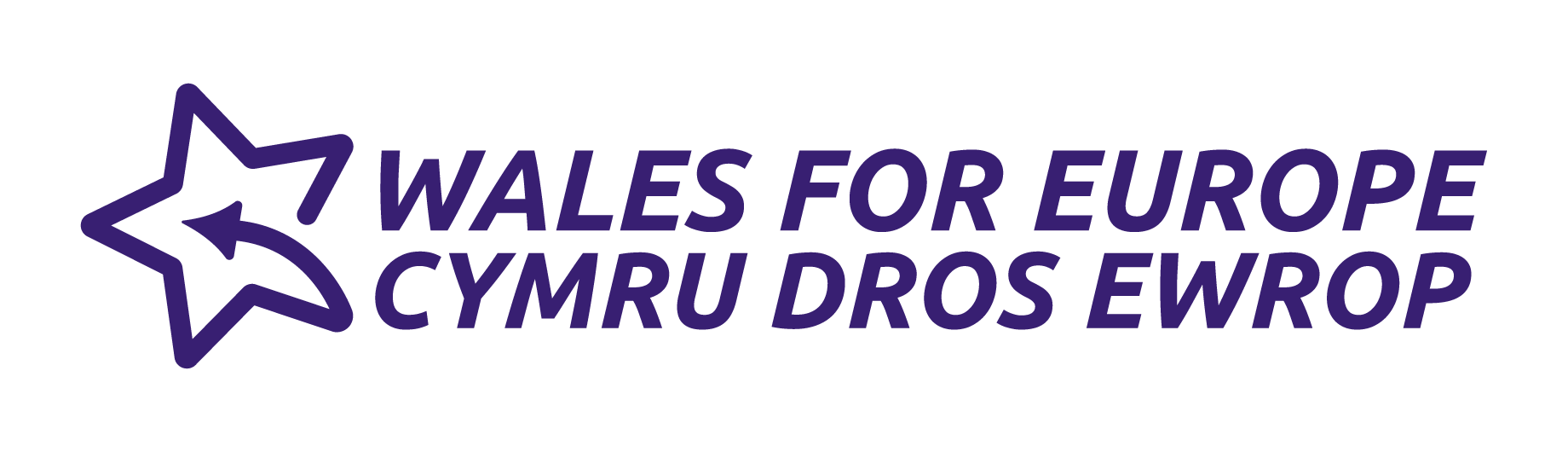
- Formation: 2016
- Type: Pressure group
- Headquarters: Temple Of Peace, King Edward Vii Avenue, Cardiff, Wales, CF10 3AP
- Location: Wales, United Kingdom
- Official language: English, Welsh
- President: Anthony Slaughter
- Chair: Dr Charles Smith
- Website: www.walesforeurope.org

Wales for Europe (Welsh: Cymru dros Ewrop) is an independent cross-party and non-party grass-roots organisation that aims to speak up for Wales’ place in Europe, believing that Wales and the United Kingdom are inextricably European by virtue of geography, shared history, culture, trade and values.

== History ==
Wales for Europe was founded ahead of the referendum in 2016.

In 2021, European Movement UK announced a strategic partnership with Wales for Europe. European Movement UK members in Wales are also members of Wales for Europe and Wales for Europe is represented with 6 seats on the European Movement UK’s National Council.

== Leadership ==
=== Chair ===
Year	Chair
2016–2020	Geraint Talfan Davies.
2020–2021	Helen Wales
2021–2023	Jackie Jones
2023–2024	Dr Caroline Turner (interim)
2024 onwards	Dr Charles Smith

=== President ===
Anthony Slaughter, leader of the Wales Green Party, was elected as the president of Wales for Europe in 2024.
