= Caerdydd Penarth =

Senedd constituency (from 2026)

- County multi-member constituency for the Senedd
- Boundary of Caerdydd Penarth in Wales
- Principal areas: Cardiff; Rhondda Cynon Taf; Vale of Glamorgan
- Preserved county: South Glamorgan
- Population: 220,137 (2024)
- Major settlements: Cardiff (south and west), Miskin, Penarth

Current County multi-member constituency
- Created: 2026
- Seats: 6
- Created from: UK Parliament boundaries: Cardiff West; Cardiff South and Penarth; Previous Senedd constituencies: Cardiff Central; Cardiff South and Penarth; Cardiff West; Pontypridd; Ogmore; Vale of Glamorgan; Previous Senedd region: South Wales Central; South Wales West

Caerdydd Penarth (Welsh for 'Cardiff [and] Penarth';) is a six-member constituency of the Senedd (Welsh Parliament; Welsh: Senedd Cymru) used in the 2026 Senedd election. It covers areas in the south-east of Wales, particularly parts of Cardiff, Rhondda Cynon Taf and the Vale of Glamorgan.

It was proposed following the 2026 review of Senedd constituencies, and is a pairing of the two UK Parliament constituencies of Cardiff West and Cardiff South and Penarth. It has a Welsh-only name.

== Boundaries ==
A Senedd constituency comprising the boundaries of the UK Parliament constituencies of Cardiff West and Cardiff South and Penarth, has been proposed by the Democracy and Boundary Commission Cymru for the 2026 election to the Senedd (Welsh Parliament; Senedd Cymru). It was initially proposed using the English name Cardiff West, South and Penarth in September 2024. The pairing was then switched from Cardiff West to Cardiff East and renamed to Cardiff South-east Penarth, and its Welsh name being De-ddwyrain Caerdydd Penarth in December proposals, despite most other constituencies using Welsh-only names. It was later given the Welsh-only name Caerdydd Penarth and its boundaries were reverted back to using Cardiff West rather than Cardiff East in the commission's final recommendations in March 2025. When announcing their candidates, Reform UK used "Cardiff South-west Penarth" instead, based on the English names for the pair of UK Parliament constituencies that form it.

It encompasses parts of the principal areas (counties/county boroughs) of Cardiff, Rhondda Cynon Taf and the Vale of Glamorgan in South Wales. The constituency was established in 2026, following the passing of the Senedd Cymru (Members and Elections) Act 2024. The act legislates electoral reform of the Senedd to create 16 larger "super constituencies", pairing the 32 UK Parliament constituencies in Wales, and using a new fully proportional voting system, with each constituency electing six Members of the Senedd (MSs) rather than one previously.

== Members of the Senedd ==
Term	Election	Distribution	MS	MS	MS	MS	MS	MS
7th	2026	1 / 3 / 1 / 1	Anna Brychan (PC)	Kiera Marshall (PC)	Joseph Martin (Ref)	Anthony Slaughter (Grn)	Leticia Gonzalez (PC)	Huw Thomas (Lab)

== Elections ==
=== Elections in the 2020s ===
2026 Senedd election: Caerdydd Penarth
Party	Candidate	Votes	%	±%
Plaid Cymru	Anna Brychan (E) Kiera Marshall (E) Leticia Gonzalez (E) Malcolm Phillips Mathew Hawkins Tomos Stokes	36,136	41.0	+21.1
Reform	Joseph Martin (E) Mark Reckless Robert Thomas Rachel Nugent Finn Paul Campbell Ruth Hancock	15,525	17.6	+16.9
Green	Anthony Slaughter (E) Tessa Marshall Rowan Stanger Tavgar Bulbas Max O’Hara Iwan Sinclair	12,113	13.8	+7.1
Labour	Huw Thomas (E) Ruba Sivanangam Peter Bradbury Steve Brooks Mutale Merrill Kanaya Singh Laura Rochefort	10,907	12.4	−25.7
Conservative	Calum Davies James Hamblin Dominic Davies Judith Child Archie Draycott Eddy Oko-Jaja	6,818	7.7	−12.7
Propel	Neil McEvoy Ceri McEvoy	3,471	3.9	−0.5
Liberal Democrats	Cadan ap Tomos Irfan Latif Elinor Dixon Barry Southwell Chris Cogger Ashley Wood	2,260	2.6	−1.9
Independent	Rhys ab Owen	414	0.5	New
Communist	Robert Griffiths	211	0.2	New
Heritage	Rhiannon Morrissey	198	0.2	New
Majority		20,611	23.4	New
Turnout		88,053	56.6	+6.5
Registered electors		155,629		
win (new seat)				

2021 notional result (Note: Estimate of the 2021 Senedd election result as if the revised boundaries recommended under the 2026 boundary review were in place)
Party	Vote	%	Seats
Labour	35,502	48.2	4
Conservative	14,210	19.3	1
Plaid Cymru	10,913	14.8	1
Propel	3,947	5.4	0
Liberal Democrats	3,083	4.2	0
Green	2,897	3.9	0
Abolish	1,466	2.0	0
Reform UK	490	0.7	0
UKIP	389	0.5	0
Independent	355	0.4	0
Freedom Alliance	237	0.3	0
Gwlad	110	0.1	0
Socialist (GB)	18	0.0	0
