= Nick Carter (politician) =

Welsh politician

Nick Carter MS
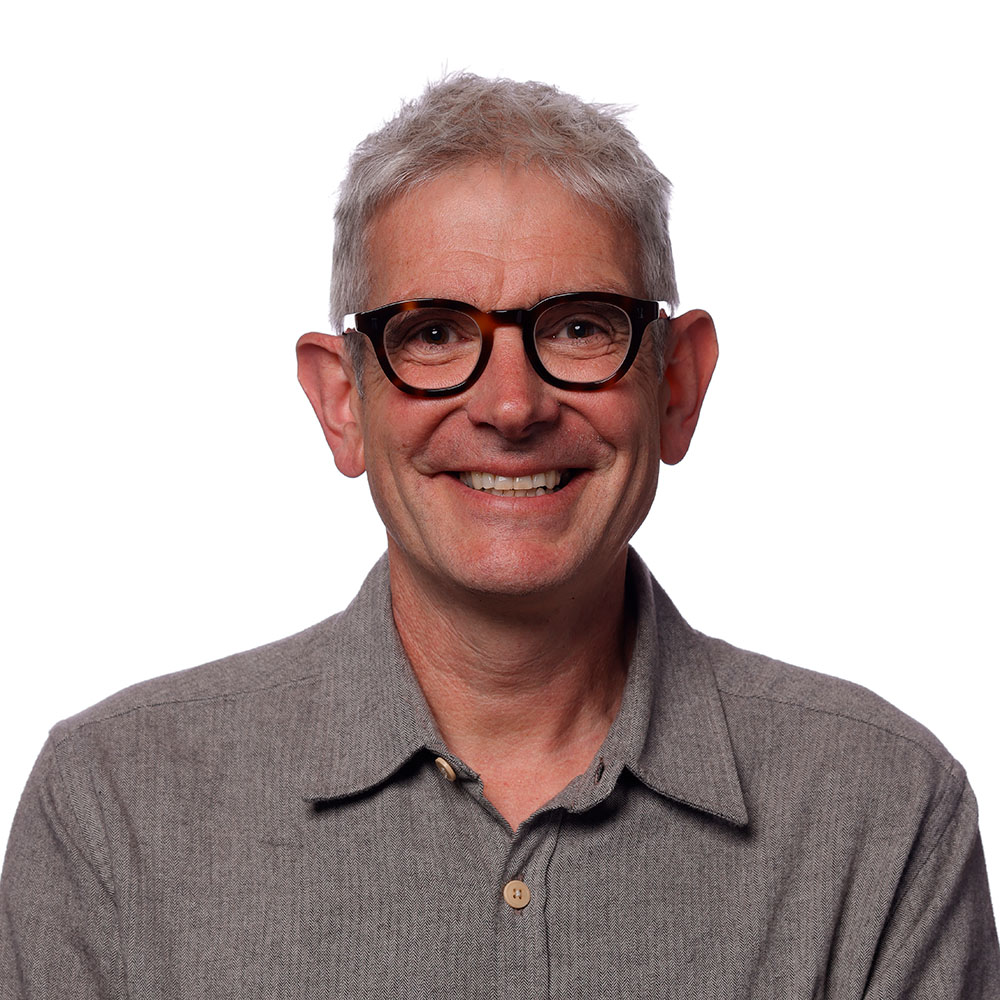
- Official portrait, 2026

Member of the Senedd for Caerdydd Ffynnon Taf
- Incumbent
- Assumed office 8 May 2026
- Preceded by: Seat Established

Personal details
- Born: 22 May 1971 (age 55)
- Party: Plaid Cymru

Nick Carter is a Welsh politician for Plaid Cymru, who has served as Member of the Senedd for the Caerdydd Ffynnon Taf constituency since May 2026. He was third on the candidate list in the 2026 Senedd election.

Carter previously stood in the 2017 and 2022 Cardiff Council elections, losing both times. In the 2022 election he stood as part of the Common Ground Alliance, a collaboration between Plaid Cymru and the Wales Green Party

== Biography ==
Carter is a chartered surveyor, and co-founded a firm of retail property advisors in 2006. He stood down as a director in 2025.

== See also ==
- 7th Senedd
