= Matthew Jones (Welsh politician) =

Welsh politician (born 1988)

Matthew Jones MS
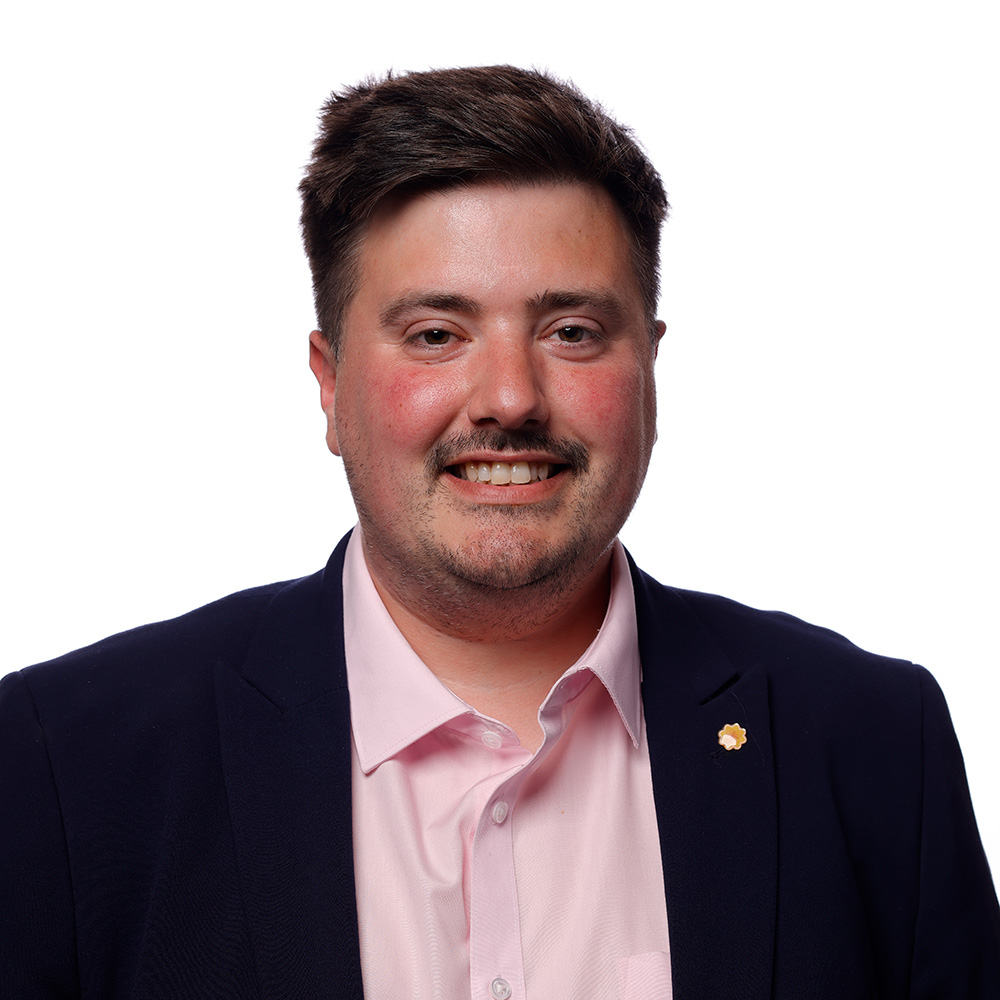
- Official portrait, 2026

Member of the Senedd
- Incumbent
- Assumed office 8 May 2026
- Constituency: Sir Fynwy Torfaen

Personal details
- Born: 1988 (age 37–38) Pontypool, Wales
- Party: Plaid Cymru

Matthew Jones (born 1988) is a Welsh Plaid Cymru politician serving as a Member of the Senedd (MS) for Sir Fynwy Torfaen since 2026.

== Biography ==
Matthew Jones was born and raised in Pontypool and went to school at Ysgol Gymraeg Gwynllyw. He has worked as a policy officer for a cancer charity. He now lives in Cwmbran.

== Political career ==
He was the candidate for Torfaen constituency and South Wales Central electoral region in the 2016 National Assembly for Wales election, and was not elected in either election. He also competed with the Plaid in the 2019 Llanbadarn Fawr-Sulien by-election in Ceredigion, and was successfully elected, but lost in the 2022 Torfaen County Borough Council election, and lost again in the 2023 Llantarnam by-election.

Jones was the Plaid candidate in the Torfaen constituency in the 2024 United Kingdom general election. He came fourth place behind Labour's Nick Thomas-Symonds.

Jones has worked in the Welsh Parliament as a caseworker. In the 2026 Senedd election, Jones was elected as a MS for the Sir Fynwy Torfaen constituency.
