= Sir Fynwy Torfaen =

Senedd constituency (from 2026)

- County multi-member constituency for the Senedd
- Boundary of Sir Fynwy Torfaen in Wales
- Principal areas: Monmouthshire; Torfaen
- Preserved county: Gwent
- Population: 189,049 (2024)
- Major settlements: Abergavenny, Caldicot, Chepstow, Cwmbran, Monmouth, Pontypool, Usk

Current County multi-member constituency
- Created: 2026
- Seats: 6
- Created from: UK Parliament boundaries: Monmouthshire; Torfaen; Previous Senedd constituencies: Monmouth; Newport East; Torfaen; Previous Senedd region: South Wales East

Sir Fynwy Torfaen (Welsh for 'Monmouthshire [and] Torfaen';) is a six-member constituency of the Senedd (Welsh Parliament; Welsh: Senedd Cymru) used in the 2026 Senedd election. It covers areas in the south-east of Wales, particularly parts of Monmouthshire and Torfaen.

It was proposed following the 2026 review of Senedd constituencies, and is a pairing of the two UK Parliament constituencies of Monmouthshire and Torfaen. It has a Welsh-only name.

== Boundaries ==
A Senedd constituency comprising the boundaries of the UK Parliament constituencies of Monmouthshire and Torfaen, has been proposed by the Democracy and Boundary Commission Cymru for the 2026 election to the Senedd (Welsh Parliament; Senedd Cymru). It was initially proposed using the English name Monmouthshire and Torfaen in September 2024, but was renamed to Mynwy Torfaen in December proposals with most constituencies using Welsh-only names. It was then given the Welsh-only name Sir Fynwy Torfaen and its boundaries were confirmed in the commission's final recommendations in March 2025. When announcing their candidates, Reform UK used "Monmouthshire, Torfaen" instead, using the English names for the pair of UK Parliament constituencies that form it.

It encompasses the entire principal areas (counties/county boroughs) of Monmouthshire and Torfaen in South Wales. The constituency was established in 2026, following the passing of the Senedd Cymru (Members and Elections) Act 2024. The act legislates electoral reform of the Senedd to create 16 larger "super constituencies", pairing the 32 UK Parliament constituencies in Wales, and using a new fully proportional voting system, with each constituency electing six Members of the Senedd (MSs) rather than one previously.

== Members of the Senedd ==
Term	Election	Distribution	MS	MS	MS	MS	MS	MS
7th	2026	2 / 1 / 1 / 2	Laura Anne Jones (Ref)	Matthew Jones (PC)	Peter Fox (Con)	Stephen Senior (Ref)	Lynne Neagle (Lab)	Donna Cushing (PC)

== Elections ==
=== Elections in the 2020s ===
2026 Senedd election: Sir Fynwy Torfaen
Party	Candidate	Votes	%	±%
Reform	Laura Anne Jones Stephen Senior Bob Blacker David Rowlands Mark Urrutia Gerard Hancock	24,155	31.1	+29.8
Plaid Cymru	Matthew Jones Donna Cushing Jayne Israel David Johnson Loti Glyn Huw Evans	18,275	23.5	+13.9
Conservative	Peter Fox Richard John Lisa Dymock Nathan Edmunds Rachel Buckler Chase Blount	13,394	17.2	−16.0
Labour	Lynne Neagle Anthony Hunt Laura Wright Catrin Maby Ben Callard Nick Byrne Su McConnel	11,627	15.0	−20.5
Green	Ian Chandler Emily Williams Charlie Aldous Lauren Sellers Darren Share Angus Paget	6,375	8.2	+1.9
Liberal Democrats	Kevin Wilkins Brendan Roberts Vicky Hepburn-John Anthea Dewhurst Martin Sutherland Iwan Thomas	2,742	3.5	−1.2
Independent	Owen Lewis	393	0.5	+0.5
Heritage	Emma Meredith	331	0.4	+0.4
Gwlad	Brad Williams	177	0.2	−0.4
Open Party	Joseph John Nicholson David Carl Atkins	147	0.2	+0.2
Independent	Welsh Pool	45	0.1	+0.1
Majority				
Turnout			51.8	+7.1
Registered electors		150,095		
win (new seat)				

2021 notional result (Note: Estimate of the 2021 Senedd election result as if the revised boundaries recommended under the 2026 boundary review were in place)
Party	Vote	%	Seats
Labour	25,566	39.3	3
Conservative	23,265	35.7	3
Plaid Cymru	5,073	7.8	0
Liberal Democrats	3,434	5.3	0
Green	2,000	3.1	0
Abolish	1,326	2.0	0
Independent	1,293	2.0	0
Reform UK	1,154	1.8	0
UKIP	980	1.5	0
Freedom Alliance	703	1.1	0
Gwlad	329	0.5	0
