= Democracy and Boundary Commission Cymru =

Welsh local government boundary body

The Democracy and Boundary Commission Cymru (Welsh: Comisiwn Democratiaeth a Ffiniau Cymru) is a Welsh Government sponsored body, responsible for defining local government boundaries and Senedd constituency boundaries in Wales, also known as Cymru.

The Commission was established originally as the Local Government Boundary Commission for Wales (Welsh: Comisiwn Ffiniau Llywodraeth Leol i Gymru) in 1972 under the Local Government Act 1972. Its purpose is to review all local government areas in Wales, the electoral arrangements for the principal areas, make proposals to the Welsh Government for effective and convenient local government. The work of the Commission was modified by the Local Government (Wales) Act 1994.

Electoral arrangements in six authorities were reviewed after the penultimate round of Welsh local elections in 1999, and the changes were implemented at the elections on 10 June 2004. In 2002, the commission also reviewed and amended some of the boundaries of the preserved counties of Wales.

In February 2009 the Minister for Local government and Social Justice issued Directions to the commission to begin an Electoral Review across all the 22 local authorities in Wales. His stated aim was to rationalise representation at "... no lower than a ratio of 1 councillor to 1,750 electors ".

The name and functioning of the commission was changed in 2013 to the Local Democracy and Boundary Commission for Wales (Welsh: Comisiwn Ffiniau a Democratiaeth Leol Cymru), as a result of the Local Government (Democracy) (Wales) Act 2013. It was renamed again by the Senedd Cymru (Members and Elections) Act 2024 to its current name and given responsibility over reviewing the borders of Senedd constituencies.

As part of electoral reform in the Senedd it proposed 16 new constituencies by pairing the 32 Westminster constituencies, these were used in the 2026 Senedd election. Following that election the Commission will conduct a full review of Senedd boundaries and do so every 8 years.

On 31 March 2025, the commission became responsible for setting the remuneration for members of principal councils (councillors of the 22 principal areas), town and community councils, Corporate Joint Committees, fire and rescue authorities and national park authorities in Wales, replacing the Independent Remuneration Panel for Wales which was abolished on that date.

== See also ==
- Boundaries Scotland
- Local Government Boundary Commission for England
- Local Government Boundary Commission for Northern Ireland
