= Dafydd Trystan Davies =

Welsh politician (born 1974)

Dafydd Trystan Davies MS
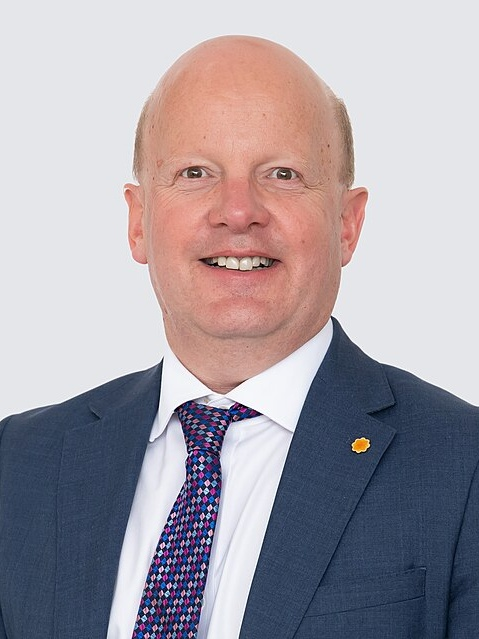
- Official portrait, 2026

Cabinet Minister for Government Effectiveness and the Constitution
- Incumbent
- Assumed office 13 May 2026
- First Minister: Rhun ap Iorwerth
- Preceded by: Rebecca Evans

Member of the Senedd
- Incumbent
- Assumed office 8 May 2026
- Constituency: Caerdydd Ffynnon Taf

Chairman of Plaid Cymru
- In office 2013 – 19 October 2019
- Leader: Leanne Wood; Adam Price
- Preceded by: Helen Mary Jones
- Succeeded by: Alun Ffred Jones

Chief Executive of Plaid Cymru
- In office 2002–2007
- Leader: Ieuan Wyn Jones
- Preceded by: Karl Davies
- Succeeded by: Gwenllian Lansdown

Personal details
- Born: August 11, 1974 (age 51) Aberdare, Wales
- Party: Plaid Cymru

Dafydd Trystan Davies (born 11 August 1974) is a Welsh academic and politician who has served as Cabinet Minister for Government Effectiveness and the Constitution and Member of the Senedd (MS) for Caerdydd Ffynnon Taf since 2026.

== Biography ==
Dafydd Trystan Davies was born in Aberdare and now lives in Grangetown, Cardiff. He studied at Ysgol Rhydfelen and at Aberystwyth University, gaining a doctorate for his work on globalisation and the Welsh economy. He was chair of Plaid Cymru from 2013 until 2019, when he was replaced by Alun Ffred Jones. Trystan is currently the Senior Academic Manager and Registrar for Coleg Cymraeg Cenedlaethol.

He was appointed chair of the Welsh Government's Active Travel Board in September 2020, and was re-appointed in August 2022. Between February and May 2024 he was a special adviser to Plaid Cymru designated members in the 2021 Welsh Labour–Plaid Cymru agreement.

== Political career ==
Davies was Plaid's parliamentary candidate for the Cynon Valley constituency at the 2010 general election, and was the party's candidate for the Welsh Assembly for the same constituency in 2011. In July 2013 he was selected as Plaid's Welsh Assembly candidate for the Cardiff South and Penarth seat, for the elections in 2016, where he came third with 14.3% of the votes.

In the 2026 Senedd election, Davies was elected as a MS, representing the Caerdydd Ffynnon Taf constituency. He announced that he would only use public transport or active travel during his duties in the Senedd; if he had to use a car he would then document this. Shortly after being elected, he was appointed as Cabinet Minister for Government Effectiveness and the Constitution.

Party political offices
Preceded by Karl Davies	Chief Executive of Plaid Cymru; 2002–2007	Succeeded by Gwenllian Lansdown
Preceded by Helen Mary Jones	Chair of Plaid Cymru; 2013–2019	Succeeded by Alun Ffred Jones
