= Zaynub Akbar =

Welsh politician and trampoline gymnast

Zaynub Akbar MS
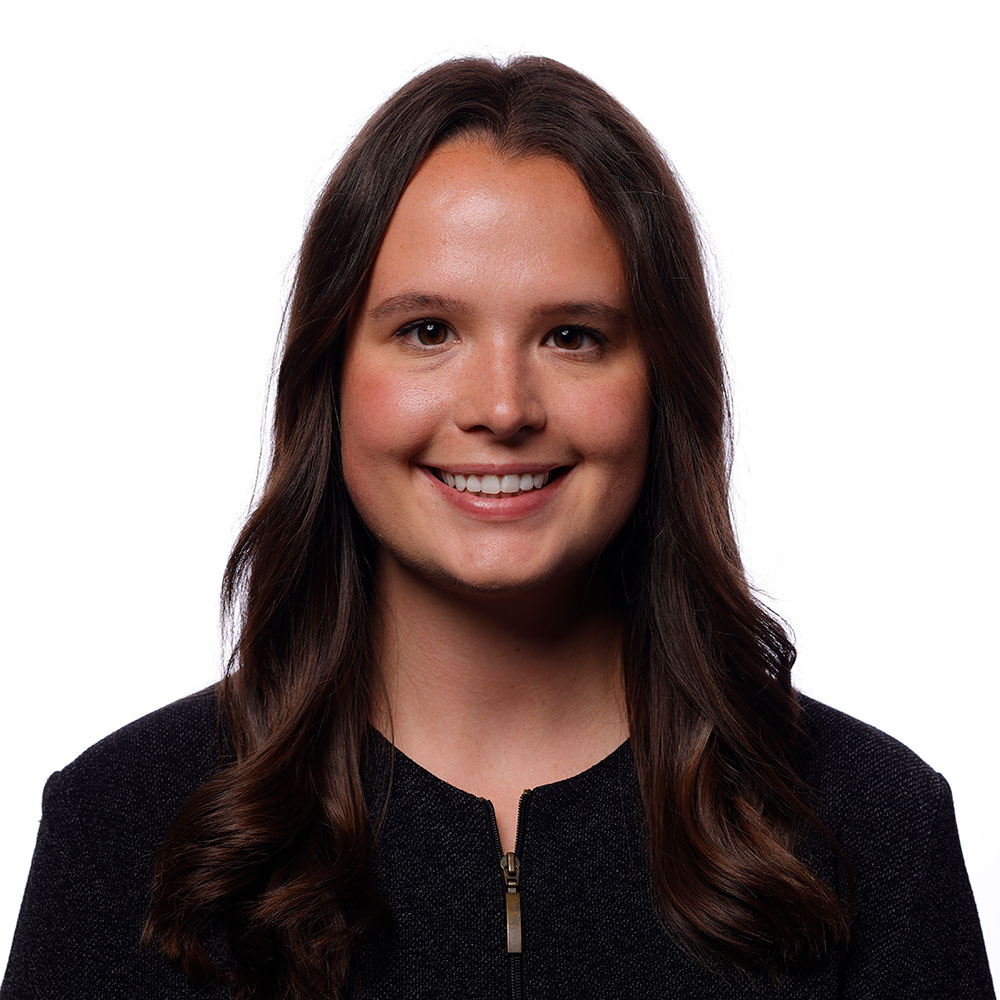
- Official portrait, 2026

Member of the Senedd for Caerdydd Ffynnon Taf
- Incumbent
- Assumed office 8 May 2026
- Preceded by: Constituency established

Personal details
- Born: Zaynub Akbar; June 1997 (age 29) Cardiff, Wales
- Party: Plaid Cymru
- Education: Cardiff University, University of Nottingham

Gymnastics career
- Discipline: Trampoline gymnastics
- Country represented: Great Britain

Zaynub Akbar (born June 1997) is a Welsh Plaid Cymru politician and former trampoline gymnast who has been a Member of the Senedd (MS) representing Caerdydd Ffynnon Taf since May 2026.

== Early life, gymnastics and journalism career ==
Akbar's grandfather came to Wales from India. She was brought up by her father and spent most of her childhood homeless and had to couch surf between people's homes.

Akbar went to Howell's School in Llandaff, Cardiff under a bursary.

She represented Great Britain at the 2014 Summer Youth Olympics, where reached the trampoline final and finished in eighth place.

Akbar studied international relations and politics at Cardiff University, studying remotely whilst living in Northampton for trampoline training. She also studied journalism at the University of Nottingham.

She worked at ITV Cymru Wales as a journalist and at Sport Wales as a public affairs officer.

== Career ==
Akbar joined the board of the Design Commission for Wales in April 2025.

She was selected as a Plaid Cymru candidate for Caerdydd Ffynnon Taf for the 2026 Senedd election, in second place on the party list behind Dafydd Trystan Davies.
