= Cardiff East =

UK Parliament constituency (since 2024)

Coordinates: 51.511°N 3.128°W

- Borough constituency for the House of Commons
- Interactive map of the constituency.
- Location of the constituency within Wales
- Electorate: 72,463 (March 2020)

Current constituency
- Created: 2024
- Member of Parliament: Jo Stevens (Labour)
- Seats: One
- Created from: Cardiff Central and Cardiff South and Penarth

Overlaps
- Senedd: Caerdydd Ffynnon Taf

Cardiff East (Welsh: Dwyrain Caerdydd) is a constituency of the House of Commons in the UK Parliament, first contested at the 2024 United Kingdom general election, following the 2023 Periodic Review of Westminster constituencies. It is currently represented by Jo Stevens of the Labour Party (UK).

A parliamentary constituency of the same name previously existed from the 1918 general election until the 1950 general election.

== Boundaries ==
The 2024 recreation comprises the City of Cardiff electoral wards of Adamsdown, Cyncoed, Pentwyn, Penylan, Plasnewydd, Llanrumney, Rumney, and Trowbridge.

The new seat is made up of the whole of the abolished Cardiff Central constituency, excluding the Cathays ward, with the addition of the Llanrumney, Rumney, and Trowbridge wards from Cardiff South and Penarth.

== Members of Parliament ==
Election	Member	Party
2024	Jo Stevens	Labour

== Election results ==
=== Elections in the 2020s ===
General election 2024: Cardiff East (Note: 2024 vote change percentage calculated using notional 2019 result for Cardiff East)
Party	Candidate	Votes	%	±%
Labour	Jo Stevens	15,833	40.5	−18.7
Liberal Democrats	Rodney Berman	6,736	17.2	+4.9
Reform	Lee Canning	4,980	12.7	+9.2
Green	Sam Coates	3,916	10.0	+9.4
Conservative	Beatrice Brandon	3,913	10.0	−12.7
Plaid Cymru	Cadewyn Eleri Skelley	3,550	9.1	+8.5
TUSC	John Aaron Williams	195	0.5	N/A
Rejected ballots		172		
Majority		9,097	23.3	−17.8
Turnout		39,123	53.7	−10.9
Registered electors		72,873		
Labour win (new seat)				

=== Elections in the 2010s ===
2019 notional result (Note: Estimate of the 2019 general election result as if the revised boundaries recommended under the 2023 boundary review were in place)
Party	Vote	%
Labour	27,705	59.2
Conservative	10,626	22.7
Liberal Democrats	5,752	12.3
Brexit Party	1,617	3.5
Green Party	300	0.6
Plaid Cymru	294	0.6
Other candidates (3)	487	1.0
Majority	17,079	36.5
Turnout	46,781	64.6
Electorate	72,463	
