= Caerdydd Ffynnon Taf =

Senedd constituency (from 2026)

- County multi-member constituency for the Senedd
- Boundary of Caerdydd Ffynnon Taf in Wales
- Principal areas: Cardiff; Rhondda Cynon Taf
- Preserved county: Mid Glamorgan; South Glamorgan
- Population: 212,885 (2024)
- Major settlements: Cardiff (north and east), Nantgarw, Taff's Well

Current County multi-member constituency
- Created: 2026
- Seats: 6
- Created from: UK Parliament boundaries: Cardiff North; Cardiff East; Previous Senedd constituencies: Cardiff Central; Cardiff North; Cardiff South and Penarth; Pontypridd; Previous Senedd region: South Wales Central

Caerdydd Ffynnon Taf (Welsh for 'Cardiff [and] Taff's Well';) is a six-member constituency of the Senedd (Welsh Parliament; Welsh: Senedd Cymru) used in the 2026 Senedd election. It covers areas in the south-east of Wales, particularly parts of Cardiff and Rhondda Cynon Taf.

It was proposed following the 2026 review of Senedd constituencies, and is a pairing of the two UK Parliament constituencies of Cardiff North and Cardiff East. It has a Welsh-only name.

== Boundaries ==
A Senedd constituency comprising the boundaries of the UK Parliament constituencies of Cardiff North and Cardiff East, has been proposed by the Democracy and Boundary Commission Cymru for the 2026 election to the Senedd (Welsh Parliament; Senedd Cymru). It was initially proposed using the English name Cardiff East and North in September 2024. The pairing was then switched from Cardiff East to Cardiff West and renamed to Cardiff North-west, and its Welsh name being Gogledd-orllewin Caerdydd in December proposals, despite most other constituencies using Welsh-only names. It was later given the Welsh-only name Caerdydd Ffynnon Taf and its boundaries were reverted to using Cardiff East rather than Cardiff West in the commission's final recommendations in March 2025. When announcing their candidates, Reform UK used "Cardiff North-east" instead, based on the English names for the pair of UK Parliament constituencies that form it.

It encompasses parts of the principal areas (counties/county boroughs) of Cardiff and Rhondda Cynon Taf in South Wales. The constituency was established in 2026, following the passing of the Senedd Cymru (Members and Elections) Act 2024. The act legislates electoral reform of the Senedd to create 16 larger "super constituencies", pairing the 32 UK Parliament constituencies in Wales, and using a new fully proportional voting system, with each constituency electing six Members of the Senedd (MSs) rather than one previously.

== Members of the Senedd ==
| Term | Election | Distribution | MS | MS | MS | MS | MS | MS |
|---|---|---|---|---|---|---|---|---|
| 7th | 2026 | 1 / 3 / 1 / 1 | Dafydd Trystan; Davies (PC) | Cai Parry-Jones (Ref) | Zaynub Akbar (PC) | Shav Taj (Lab) | Nick Carter (PC) | Paul Rock (Grn) |

== Elections ==
=== Elections in the 2020s ===
2026 Senedd election: Caerdydd Ffynnon Taf
| Party | Candidate | Votes | % | ±% |
|---|---|---|---|---|
| Plaid Cymru | Dafydd Trystan Davies Zaynub Akbar Nick Carter Andrea Gibson Joseff Gnagbo Morgan Barber-Rogers | 32,617 | 36.9 | N/A |
| Reform | Cai Parry-Jones David Parsons Aaeron Giboney Kenzie Hollingsworth Evans Jeffrey Armstrong Valerie Ann Cousins | 17,335 | 19.7 | N/A |
| Labour | Shav Taj Jackie Jones Dan De'Ath Sarah Merry Jen Burke Lee Bridgeman Matt Hexter Bernie Bowen-Thomson | 11,261 | 12.8 | N/A |
| Green | Paul Rock Charlotte Husnjak Laurie Gray Jenny Mears Robyn Thomas David Fitzpatrick | 9,036 | 10.2 | N/A |
| Conservative | Joel James Samantha Cohan Joe Roberts Ffinian Elliott Lyn Hudson Jane Lucas | 8,479 | 9.6 | N/A |
| Liberal Democrats | Rodney Berman Joe Carter Julie Goodfellow Jon Shimmin Imran Latif Rosemary Chaloner | 8,442 | 9.6 | N/A |
| Propel | Keith Parry Roy Leyshon | 561 | 0.6 | N/A |
| Heritage | Nikki Brooke | 208 | 0.2 | N/A |
| Independent | Lawrence Gwynn (Note: was a member of Reform UK until 1 April 2026) | 156 | 0.2 | N/A |
| TUSC | John Aaron Williams Helen Perriam David Bartlett | 125 | 0.1 | N/A |
| Majority | | | | |
| Turnout | | 88,441 | 58.65 | N/A |
| Registered electors | | 151,198 | | |

2021 notional result (Note: Estimate of the 2021 Senedd election result as if the revised boundaries recommended under the 2026 boundary review were in place)
| Party | Vote | % | Seats |
|---|---|---|---|
| Labour | 36,033 | 47.4 | 4 |
| Conservative | 18,436 | 24.2 | 2 |
| Plaid Cymru | 7,893 | 10.4 | 0 |
| Liberal Democrats | 6,396 | 8.4 | 0 |
| Green | 3,735 | 4.9 | 0 |
| Abolish | 1,609 | 2.1 | 0 |
| Propel | 725 | 1.0 | 0 |
| Reform UK | 435 | 0.6 | 0 |
| Independent | 123 | 0.2 | 0 |
| Gwlad | 90 | 0.1 | 0 |
| Socialist (GB) | 64 | 0.1 | 0 |
