= Senedd Cymru (Members and Elections) Act 2024 =

Welsh legislation

Senedd Cymru (Members and Elections) Act 2024 (Note: Section 26.)
- Act of Senedd Cymru
- Senedd Cymru
- Long title: An Act of Senedd Cymru to make provision about Members of the Senedd and offices held by those Members; Senedd Cymru constituencies; returning and maintaining Senedd Cymru; the Local Democracy and Boundary Commission for Wales; and for connected purposes.
- Citation: 2024 asc 4
- Introduced by: Mick Antoniw MS, Counsel General and Minister for the Constitution
- Territorial extent: Wales

Dates
- Royal assent: 24 June 2024
- Commencement: various (Note: Section 25.)

Other legislation
- Amends: Government of Wales Act 1998; Political Parties, Elections and Referendums Act 2000; Electoral Administration Act 2006; Government of Wales Act 2006; Democracy and Boundary Commission Cymru etc. Act 2013 (formerly: Local Government (Democracy) (Wales) Act 2013); Wales Act 2014
- Amended by: Elections and Elected Bodies (Wales) Act 2024

Status: Amended

Text of statute as originally enacted

Revised text of statute as amended

Text of the Senedd Cymru (Members and Elections) Act 2024 as in force today (including any amendments) within the United Kingdom, from legislation.gov.uk.

The Senedd Cymru (Members and Elections) Act 2024 (asc 4) (sometimes referred to as the Senedd Reform Act) is an act of the Senedd, the legislature of Wales, passed with the intent of expanding and reforming it. Provisions included creating sixteen larger constituencies, each electing six members of the Senedd (MSs) by proportional representation. The bill was introduced on 18 September 2023, received royal assent on 24 June 2024, and the changes made to the Senedd's electoral system were introduced in the 2026 election.

== Background ==
The Richard Commission report of 2004 suggested an increase in the number of Members to 80. That number was also suggested, as a minimum, by the 2014 report of the Silk Commission. Similarly, in 2013 and 2016, the Electoral Reform Society published reports making the case for enlarging the Assembly. A 2017 report of an expert commission led by Laura McAllister suggested an increase to between 80 and 90 Members, switching to single transferable vote (STV) and enforcing gender quotas. There was no cross-party consensus on any of these measures in 2017.

As part of the 2021 co-operation agreement between Welsh Labour and Plaid Cymru, the parties agreed on an expansion of the Senedd to between 80 and 100 Members and a more proportional voting method, one that integrates gender quotas. Paragraph 22 also asked for recommendations to be made by the Special Purpose Committee by 31 May 2022, and aimed to pass legislation in the ensuing 12 to 18 months so that it could be applied for the next election in 2026.

A Special Committee was set up on 6 October 2021, composed of five members representing each party, as well as the Llywydd of the Senedd. They held public and private meetings on the issues. In May 2022, a joint position statement was published by First Minister Mark Drakeford and Plaid Cymru Leader Adam Price, and sent to the Special Committee. In it, they called for a 96-Member Senedd, all elected through closed party list proportional representation (using the D'Hondt method) with mandatory "zipping" of male and female candidates in the list to ensure that for every party, half of the candidates will be women (unlike the voluntary all-women shortlists used by the Labour Party). With a reduction in the number of Welsh MPs and new constituency boundaries being proposed for the next UK general election, the Senedd elections were proposed to be organised in 16 six-member regions created by pairing up the 32 redrawn Westminster constituencies.

The final report of the Special Committee was published on 30 May 2022 and recommended the system agreed to by the Labour and Plaid Cymru leaders. Although the Expert Panel preferred the single transferable vote to any other method, the closed list PR system was favoured by the Committee over its capacity to enforce gender quotas through mandatory zipping, although the gender quotas rule was later abandoned. The report was discussed in plenary session on 8 June 2022, and approved 40–15.

=== Further proposals ===
In February 2023, plans for additional reform included:

- Candidates must be resident in Wales
- A defection of an MS to another party is not permitted. An MS would instead have to become an independent.
- Independent candidates must disclose any party membership.

In September 2023, it was also proposed job sharing among Welsh Government ministers also be considered.

== Opposition to the reforms ==
Welsh Conservatives have opposed the Senedd's expansion plan, which they fear would be costly, and have called for a referendum, arguing that only a public mandate can give legitimacy to such a reform. In 2022, the sentiment was also expressed by the Conservative UK Government Welsh Secretary Simon Hart. His deputy, Conservative MP David TC Davies, told his party conference that the reform plan would "lock in a Labour government forever" and "concentrate power in the hands of a few party managers". On 10 May 2022, Conservative MS Darren Millar resigned from the Committee in disagreement to the Drakeford-Price joint statement, saying "Wales needs more doctors, dentists, nurses and teachers, not more politicians in Cardiff Bay". The additional annual cost of the proposals was estimated as £17.8 million.

== Provisions ==
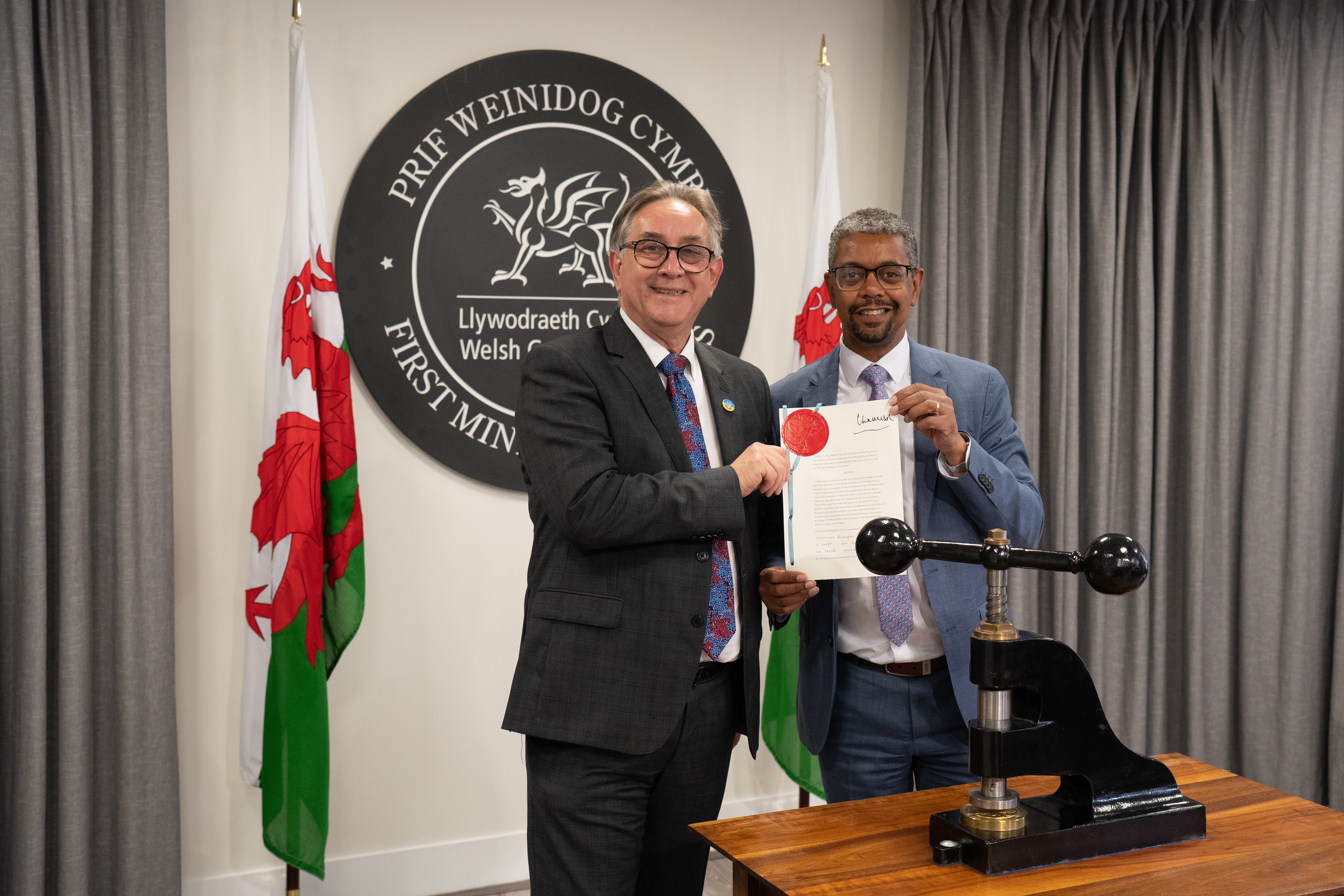
Counsel General Mick Antoniw and First Minister Vaughan Gething hold up the Act after it gained royal assent on 24 June 2024

On 18 September 2023, the Welsh Government published its plans for electoral reform as part of the proposed Senedd Cymru (Members and Elections) Bill. The number of Senedd constituencies is set to fall to 16, which would be pairings of the proposed 32 constituencies in Wales for Westminster elections. Each constituency would elect six MSs from a closed list under the D'Hondt method. Under the proposals, all candidates must live in Wales, and elections would take place every four years rather than five. The first minister is proposed to have the power to appoint 17 rather than the current 12 ministers, plus the counsel general, to the Welsh Government, and the number of ministers could be increased to 18/19, pending further Senedd approval. There is also the addition of another deputy presiding officer.

The Bill was passed by a supermajority of MSs on 8 May 2024 with the entire Conservative Party voting against and every other party in favour. The Bill did not take forward the proposals to enshrine a gender balanced Senedd in law amid doubts over whether the Senedd has the power to pass such a law under the existing devolution settlement. These changes were eventually introduced in the Senedd Cymru (Electoral Candidate Lists) Bill on 11 March 2024, but abandoned in September 2024.

=== Constituencies ===
Map of the 16 constituencies to be used for the election (Note: Labelled using their sole Welsh names, with Caerdydd being the Welsh name for Cardiff)

- Afan Ogwr Rhondda
- Bangor Conwy Môn
- Blaenau Gwent Caerffili Rhymni
- Brycheiniog Tawe Nedd
- Caerdydd Penarth
- Caerdydd Ffynnon Taf
- Casnewydd Islwyn
- Ceredigion Penfro
- Clwyd
- Fflint Wrecsam
- Gwynedd Maldwyn
- Gŵyr Abertawe
- Pen-y-bont Bro Morgannwg
- Pontypridd Cynon Merthyr
- Sir Fynwy Torfaen
- Sir Gaerfyrddin

Review:

- Initial proposals of 16 constituencies
- Revised proposals of 16 constituencies
- Final proposals of 16 constituencies
