= Anthony Slaughter =

Welsh politician (born 1962)

Anthony Slaughter MS
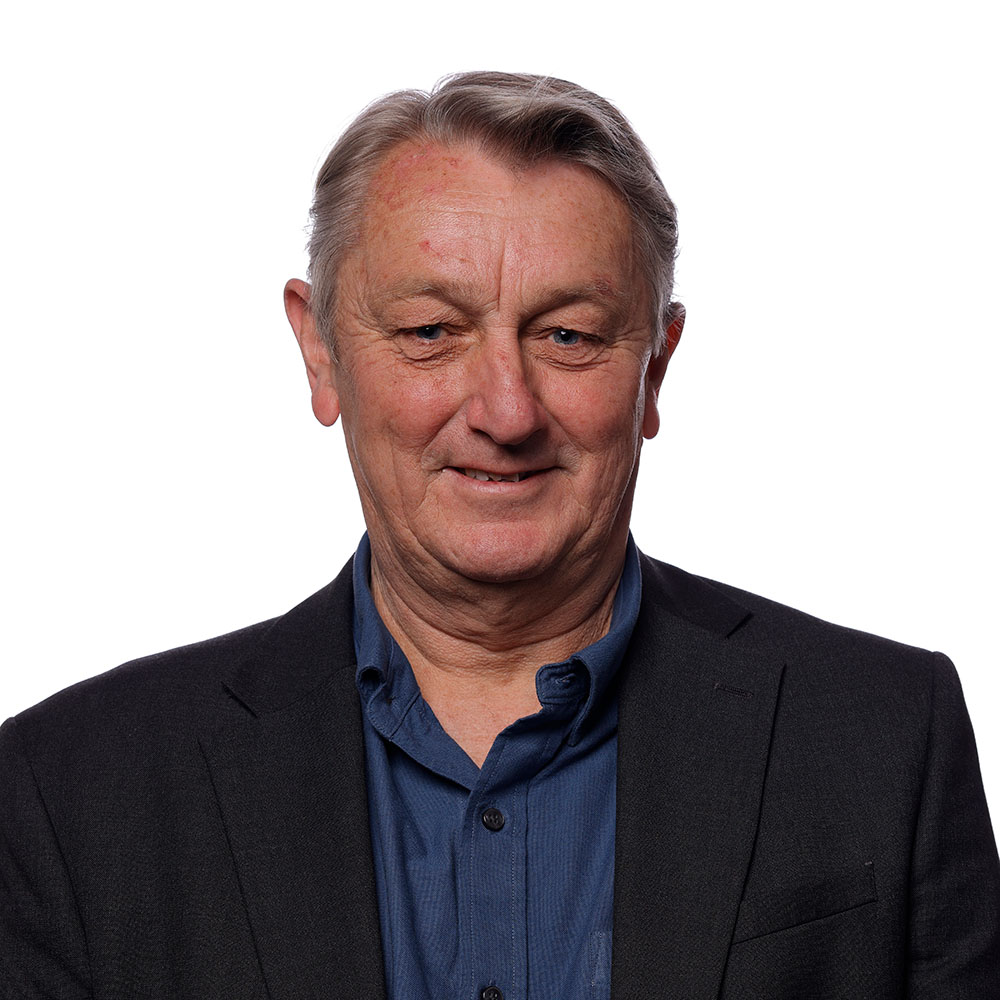
- Official portrait, 2026

Leader of the Wales Green Party
- Incumbent
- Assumed office 21 December 2018
- Preceded by: Grenville Ham

Member of the Senedd for Caerdydd Penarth
- Incumbent
- Assumed office 8 May 2026
- Preceded by: Constituency established

Personal details
- Born: 1962 (age 63–64) Kingston upon Hull, Yorkshire, England
- Party: Green
- Occupation: Politician
- Website: https://wales.greenparty.org.uk/green-party-wales-leader/

Anthony David Slaughter (born 1962) is a Welsh politician who has served as Leader of the Wales Green Party since 2018, and as a Member of the Senedd (MS) for Caerdydd Penarth since May 2026.

He previously served as Deputy Leader of the Wales Green Party from 2014 to 2015. In 2024 Slaughter was appointed as the President of Wales for Europe. He has previously been a candidate for general, local authority and town council seats.

== Early life and early career ==
Slaughter was born in Kingston upon Hull, Yorkshire in 1962. As an infant, he and his family emigrated to Australia as "ten pound Poms", before returning to Hull due to homesickness. They then moved to South Africa in 1970, where Slaughter grew up.

He developed an interest in punk rock and chose not to enrol at Cape Town University because he wanted "to be the next Joe Strummer". He formed a punk band called Riot Squad (later Riot Squad SA after the discovery of a British band with the same name). The band released an EP, Total Onslaught, which was banned in South Africa; and later became the first South African punk record to be released in the UK or Europe.

Slaughter later moved to Hackney in London to avoid conscription to the South African Defence Force, where he would have had to serve two years in the "apartheid army". He worked with War Resisters' International to help other South Africans avoid conscription as well. Slaughter stated "I spent two and a half decades more or less in London, living as a squatter for a long time in the anarcho-punk scene".

In 2021 he stated that he had lived in "Penarth in the Vale of Glamorgan for the last 17 years". Slaughter previously worked as a garden designer and landscaper. Slaughter has been involved with, and was chair of, the local community organisation Gwyrddio Penarth Greening, a grassroots community organisation focused on planting and maintenance of the GPG Community Orchard that serves the local community.

== Political career and campaigning ==
After moving to Penarth in the early 2000s, Slaughter joined the Green Party in 2010. He was the Green candidate for the 2012 Cardiff South and Penarth by-election and came in 6th place. He served as the deputy leader of the Wales Green Party from 2014 to 2015. He contested Cardiff South and Penarth in the 2016 National Assembly for Wales election and was 2nd candidate on the party list in South Wales Central behind Amelia Womack.

In the 2017 Vale of Glamorgan Council election, Slaughter stood in the local authority ward of St Augustine's, a target seat. In 2018 he became the leader of the Wales Green Party. In the 2019 European Parliament election in the United Kingdom he was the lead candidate for the Green Party in the Wales constituency. In the 2019 UK general election, Slaughter stood as the Green candidate in the Vale of Glamorgan UK parliament constituency, coming third, with a 5.9% vote share. The seat was supported by Unite to Remain as part of a coordinated effort with Plaid Cymru and the Liberal Democrats, in the interest of a proposed referendum on the Brexit withdrawal agreement. Slaughter was also a co-founder of the Vale for Europe campaign group, a Vale of Glamorgan grassroots group that campaigned for a people's vote concerning Brexit.

For the 2021 Senedd election, he stood in the Vale of Glamorgan Senedd constituency, obtaining 2.9% in fifth place. During the 2024 UK general election he stood as the Wales Green Party candidate for Cardiff South and Penarth coming second, increasing his vote share to 14.5%. In 2024 Slaughter was also appointed as the President of Wales for Europe. In September 2024 Slaughter declared "...we will get our first Green elected to the Senedd in 2026" at the Green Party of England and Wales autumn conference in Manchester.

After the leadership election in which Zack Polanski won, the party membership in Wales tripled. In the 2026 Senedd election, he was elected in Caerdydd Penarth. In November 2026, it was reported that he would not seek another term as leader. This triggered a leadership election for later in the year.

== Policies and views ==
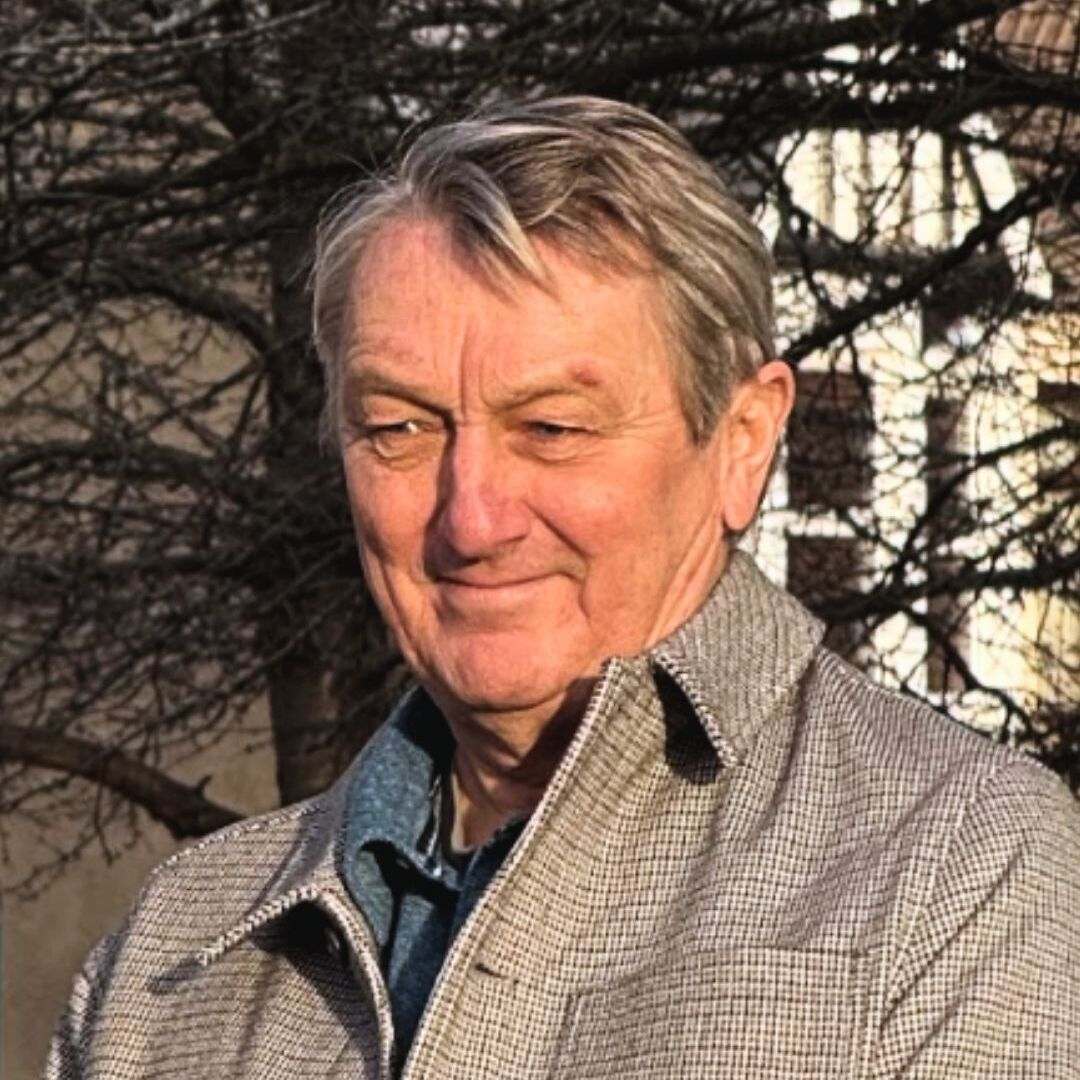
Slaughter in February 2026

Since the Brexit referendum in 2016 he has consistently campaigned for Wales to have closer ties with Europe. Slaughter supports Welsh independence, and in 2021 he joined YesCymru. He also supports the creation of a Welsh republic.

In April 2023, Slaughter was one of the signatories of the letter from the LGBTIQA+ Greens to the Equality and Human Rights Commission, criticising their guidance "Clarifying the definition of ‘sex’ in the Equality Act" in the wake of the Supreme Court judgment in For Women Scotland Ltd v The Scottish Ministers. At the Green Party conference in October that year, Slaughter gave a keynote speech setting out his vision for an independent Wales: "An independent, diverse, welcoming, cosmopolitan nation committed to equality. ... Independence is meaningless if society continues to tolerate transphobia, homophobia and all other bigotries." In November 2023, Slaughter voiced his support for an "immediate ceasefire in Gaza", condemning the "indiscriminate killing of civilians and collective punishment of a population".

In 2024, Slaughter released the book Future Wales: A Vision for Green Democracy, which outlined his views concerning "the possible ways forward for our country in an uncertain global future." In June 2024 Slaughter stated he supported a tax for the "super-wealthy" to help fund services like the NHS. In September 2024 Slaughter spoke about the need for public ownership of the Welsh steel industry.
