= Shav Taj =

Welsh trade unionist and politician (born 1976)

Shav Taj MS
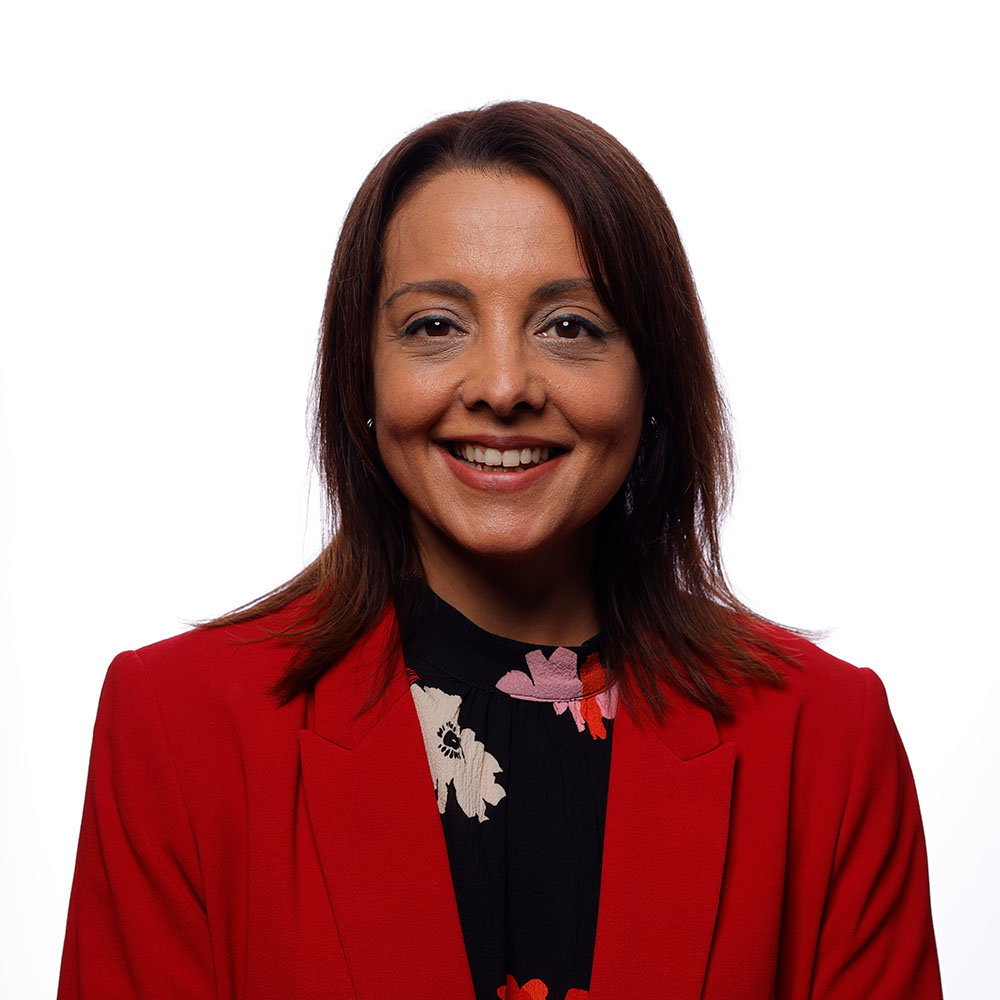
- Official portrait, 2026

Member of the Senedd
- Incumbent
- Assumed office 8 May 2026
- Constituency: Caerdydd Ffynnon Taf

General Secretary of Wales TUC
- Incumbent
- Assumed office February 2020

Personal details
- Born: 1976 (age 49–50)
- Party: Welsh Labour

Shavanah Taj (born 1976) is a Welsh trade unionist and Labour Party politician. She has been leader of the Wales TUC since 2020. She has served as a Member of the Senedd (MS) for Caerdydd Ffynnon Taf since May 2026.

== Early life ==
Taj's father Mohamed Taj Khan came to the UK from Pakistan in 1958 and became a shop steward and health and safety representative in Port Talbot and Cardiff steelworks. Her mother later ran a fabric shop. Shavanah was born and grew up in Cardiff. She was a pupil at Cathays High School, and when she was 14 years old organised an anti-racism campaign. She went on to study at Coleg Glan Hafren, the University of Glamorgan and the University of the West of England.

== Trade union career ==
Taj had been Welsh Secretary of the Public and Commercial Services Union (PCS) since 2013, before becoming acting General Secretary of the Wales TUC in February 2020. She was the second woman to hold the position and the first BAME person to do so.

She appeared on the BBC Question Time panel in December 2022 and April 2025.

== Political career ==
Taj has been vice-chairwoman of Welsh Labour's BAME committee.

In May 2025 Taj revealed she had had informal conversations about standing for election to the Senedd. In December 2025 it was announced that Taj had won a Labour Party ballot to be placed top of the closed list of prospective candidates for the Caerdydd Ffynnon Taf constituency at the 2026 Senedd election. She was subsequently elected to the Senedd in May 2026.

On 19 May 2026 Taj was appointed as Labour's spokesperson in the Senedd for employment, equalities and economic transformation.

== Personal life ==
Taj lives in Cardiff. She is married and has two daughters.
