= List of members of the Senedd =

This is a list of members who have ever been elected to the Senedd, since its first election in 1999 as the National Assembly for Wales.

The number assigned to each MS is arbitrary and does not indicate any kind of rank or seniority. It is only for use in this table. To date 227 individuals have served as MSs (formerly AMs before 2020).

Members of the Senedd and former National Assembly for Wales (1999–present)
	Name	Portrait		Party	From	To	Assembly					Senedd		Notes
	Name	Portrait		Party	From	To	1	2	3	4	5	6	7	Notes
001	Lorraine Barrett		Cardiff South and Penarth	Labour	1999	2011	check	check	check	X mark	X mark	X mark	X mark	
002	Mick Bates		Montgomeryshire	Liberal Democrats	1999	2011	check	check	check	X mark	X mark	X mark	X mark	Sat as an independent from 16 April 2010
002	Mick Bates		Montgomeryshire	Independent	1999	2011	check	check	check	X mark	X mark	X mark	X mark	Sat as an independent from 16 April 2010
003	Peter Black		South Wales West	Liberal Democrats	1999	2016	check	check	check	check	X mark	X mark	X mark	
004	Nick Bourne		Mid and West Wales	Conservative	1999	2011	check	check	check	X mark	X mark	X mark	X mark	
005	Rosemary Butler		Newport West	Labour	1999	2016	check	check	check	check	X mark	X mark	X mark	
006	Alun Cairns		South Wales West	Conservative	1999	2011	check	check	check	X mark	X mark	X mark	X mark	
007	Christine Chapman		Cynon Valley	Labour	1999	2016	check	check	check	check	X mark	X mark	X mark	
008	Cynog Dafis		Mid and West Wales	Plaid Cymru	1999	2003	check	X mark	X mark	X mark	X mark	X mark	X mark	
009	Jane Davidson		Pontypridd	Labour	1999	2011	check	check	check	X mark	X mark	X mark	X mark	
010	Andrew Davies		Swansea West	Labour	1999	2011	check	check	check	X mark	X mark	X mark	X mark	
011	David TC Davies		Monmouth	Conservative	1999	2007	check	check	X mark	X mark	X mark	X mark	X mark	
012	Geraint Davies		Rhondda	Plaid Cymru	1999	2003	check	X mark	X mark	X mark	X mark	X mark	X mark	
013	Glyn Davies		Mid and West Wales	Conservative	1999	2007	check	check	X mark	X mark	X mark	X mark	X mark	
014	Janet Davies		South Wales West	Plaid Cymru	1999	2007	check	check	X mark	X mark	X mark	X mark	X mark	
015	Jocelyn Davies		South Wales East	Plaid Cymru	1999	2011	check	check	check	X mark	X mark	X mark	X mark	
016	Ron Davies		Caerphilly	Labour	1999	2003	check	X mark	X mark	X mark	X mark	X mark	X mark	
017	Richard Edwards		Preseli Pembrokeshire	Labour	1999	2003	check	X mark	X mark	X mark	X mark	X mark	X mark	
018	Dafydd Elis-Thomas		Meirionnydd Nant Conwy then Dwyfor Meirionnydd	Plaid Cymru	1999	2021	check	check	check	check	check	X mark	X mark	Left Plaid Cymru to sit as an independent on 14 October 2016
018	Dafydd Elis-Thomas		Meirionnydd Nant Conwy then Dwyfor Meirionnydd	Independent	1999	2021	check	check	check	check	check	X mark	X mark	Left Plaid Cymru to sit as an independent on 14 October 2016
019	Sue Essex		Cardiff North	Labour	1999	2007	check	check	X mark	X mark	X mark	X mark	X mark	
020	Val Feld		Swansea East	Labour	1999	2001	Orange tick	X mark	X mark	X mark	X mark	X mark	X mark	
021	Mike German		South Wales East	Liberal Democrats	1999	2010	check	check	Orange tick	X mark	X mark	X mark	X mark	
022	Brian Gibbons		Aberavon	Labour	1999	2011	check	check	check	X mark	X mark	X mark	X mark	
023	William Graham		South Wales East	Conservative	1999	2016	check	check	check	check	X mark	X mark	X mark	
024	Janice Gregory		Ogmore	Labour	1999	2016	check	check	check	check	X mark	X mark	X mark	
025	John Griffiths		Newport East	Labour	1999	2026	check	check	check	check	check	check	X mark	
026	Christine Gwyther		Carmarthen West and South Pembrokeshire	Labour	1999	2007	check	check	X mark	X mark	X mark	X mark	X mark	
027	Alison Halford		Delyn	Labour	1999	2003	check	X mark	X mark	X mark	X mark	X mark	X mark	
028	Brian Hancock		Islwyn	Plaid Cymru	1999	2003	check	X mark	X mark	X mark	X mark	X mark	X mark	
029	Edwina Hart		Gower	Labour	1999	2016	check	check	check	check	X mark	X mark	X mark	
030	Christine Humphreys		North Wales	Liberal Democrats	1999	2001	Orange tick	X mark	X mark	X mark	X mark	X mark	X mark	
031	Jane Hutt		Vale of Glamorgan	Labour	1999	2026	check	check	check	check	check	check	X mark	
032	Pauline Jarman		South Wales Central	Plaid Cymru	1999	2003	check	X mark	X mark	X mark	X mark	X mark	X mark	
033	Ann Jones		Vale of Clwyd	Labour	1999	2021	check	check	check	check	check	X mark	X mark	
034	Carwyn Jones		Bridgend	Labour	1999	2021	check	check	check	check	check	X mark	X mark	
035	Elin Jones		Ceredigion	Plaid Cymru	1999	2026	check	check	check	check	check	check	check	
035	Elin Jones		Ceredigion Penfro	Plaid Cymru	2026	Present	check	check	check	check	check	check	check	
036	Gareth Jones		Conwy	Plaid Cymru	1999	2003	check	X mark	X mark	X mark	X mark	X mark	X mark	
036	Gareth Jones		Aberconwy	Plaid Cymru	2007	2011	check	X mark	X mark	X mark	X mark	X mark	X mark	
037	Helen Mary Jones		Llanelli	Plaid Cymru	1999	2003	check	X mark	X mark	X mark	X mark	X mark	X mark	
037	Helen Mary Jones		Mid and West Wales	Plaid Cymru	2003	2007	check	X mark	X mark	X mark	X mark	X mark	X mark	
037	Helen Mary Jones		Llanelli	Plaid Cymru	2007	2011	check	X mark	X mark	X mark	X mark	X mark	X mark	
037	Helen Mary Jones		Mid and West Wales	Plaid Cymru	2018	2021	check	X mark	X mark	X mark	X mark	X mark	X mark	
038	Ieuan Wyn Jones		Ynys Môn	Plaid Cymru	1999	2013	check	check	check	Orange tick	X mark	X mark	X mark	
039	Peter Law		Blaenau Gwent	Labour	1999	2006	check	Orange tick	X mark	X mark	X mark	X mark	X mark	Sat as an independent from April 2005, died 25 April 2006
039	Peter Law		Blaenau Gwent	Independent	1999	2006	check	Orange tick	X mark	X mark	X mark	X mark	X mark	Sat as an independent from April 2005, died 25 April 2006
040	Huw Lewis		Merthyr Tidfil and Rhymney	Labour	1999	2016	check	check	check	check	X mark	X mark	X mark	
041	Dai Lloyd		South Wales West	Plaid Cymru	1999	2011	check	check	check	X mark	X mark	X mark	X mark	
041	Dai Lloyd		South Wales West	Plaid Cymru	2016	2021	check	check	check	X mark	X mark	X mark	X mark	
042	John Marek		Wrexham	Labour	1999	2007	check	check	X mark	X mark	X mark	X mark	X mark	Elected as Labour in 1999. Re-elected in 2003 under the label John Marek Independent Party, then sat as Forward Wales from Nov 2003
042	John Marek		Wrexham	John Marek Independent Party	1999	2007	check	check	X mark	X mark	X mark	X mark	X mark	Elected as Labour in 1999. Re-elected in 2003 under the label John Marek Independent Party, then sat as Forward Wales from Nov 2003
042	John Marek		Wrexham	Forward Wales	1999	2007	check	check	X mark	X mark	X mark	X mark	X mark	Elected as Labour in 1999. Re-elected in 2003 under the label John Marek Independent Party, then sat as Forward Wales from Nov 2003
043	David Melding		South Wales Central	Conservative	1999	2021	check	check	check	check	check	X mark	X mark	
044	Alun Michael		Mid and West Wales	Labour	1999	2000	Orange tick	X mark	X mark	X mark	X mark	X mark	X mark	
045	Tom Middlehurst		Alyn and Deeside	Labour	1999	2003	check	X mark	X mark	X mark	X mark	X mark	X mark	
046	Jonathan Morgan		South Wales Central	Conservative	1999	2007	check	check	check	X mark	X mark	X mark	X mark	
046	Jonathan Morgan		Cardiff North	Conservative	2007	2011	check	check	check	X mark	X mark	X mark	X mark	
047	Rhodri Morgan		Cardiff West	Labour	1999	2011	check	check	check	X mark	X mark	X mark	X mark	
048	Lynne Neagle		Torfaen	Labour	1999	2026	check	check	check	check	check	check	check	
048	Lynne Neagle		Sir Fynwy Torfaen	Labour	2026	Present	check	check	check	check	check	check	check	
049	Alun Pugh		Clwyd West	Labour	1999	2007	check	check	X mark	X mark	X mark	X mark	X mark	
050	Jenny Randerson		Cardiff Central	Liberal Democrats	1999	2011	check	check	check	X mark	X mark	X mark	X mark	
051	Rod Richards		North Wales	Conservative	1999	2002	Orange tick	X mark	X mark	X mark	X mark	X mark	X mark	
052	Peter Rogers		North Wales	Conservative	1999	2003	check	X mark	X mark	X mark	X mark	X mark	X mark	
053	Janet Ryder		North Wales	Plaid Cymru	1999	2011	check	check	check	X mark	X mark	X mark	X mark	
054	Karen Sinclair		Clwyd South	Labour	1999	2011	check	check	check	X mark	X mark	X mark	X mark	
055	Gwenda Thomas		Neath	Labour	1999	2016	check	check	check	check	X mark	X mark	X mark	
056	Owen John Thomas		South Wales Central	Plaid Cymru	1999	2007	check	check	X mark	X mark	X mark	X mark	X mark	
057	Rhodri Glyn Thomas		Carmarthen East and Dinefwr	Plaid Cymru	1999	2016	check	check	check	check	X mark	X mark	X mark	
058	Dafydd Wigley		Aberconwy	Plaid Cymru	1999	2003	check	X mark	X mark	X mark	X mark	X mark	X mark	
059	Kirsty Williams		Brecon and Radnorshire	Liberal Democrats	1999	2021	check	check	check	check	check	X mark	X mark	
060	Phil Williams		South Wales East	Plaid Cymru	1999	2003	check	X mark	X mark	X mark	X mark	X mark	X mark	
061	Delyth Evans		Mid and West Wales	Labour	2000	2003	Orange tick	X mark	X mark	X mark	X mark	X mark	X mark	
062	Eleanor Burnham		North Wales	Liberal Democrats	2001	2011	Orange tick	check	check	X mark	X mark	X mark	X mark	
063	Val Lloyd		Swansea East	Labour	2001	2011	Orange tick	check	check	X mark	X mark	X mark	X mark	
064	David Jones		North Wales	Conservative	2002	2003	Orange tick	X mark	X mark	X mark	X mark	X mark	X mark	
065	Leighton Andrews		Rhondda	Labour	2003	2016	X mark	check	check	check	X mark	X mark	X mark	
066	Jeff Cuthbert		Caerphilly	Labour	2003	2011	X mark	check	check	X mark	X mark	X mark	X mark	
067	Tamsin Dunwoody-Kneafsey		Preseli Pembrokeshire	Labour	2003	2007	X mark	check	X mark	X mark	X mark	X mark	X mark	
068	Lisa Francis		Mid and West Wales	Conservative	2003	2007	X mark	check	X mark	X mark	X mark	X mark	X mark	
069	Denise Idris Jones		Conwy	Labour	2003	2007	X mark	check	X mark	X mark	X mark	X mark	X mark	
070	Mark Isherwood		North Wales	Conservative	2003	2026	X mark	check	check	check	check	check	X mark	
071	Irene James		Islwyn	Labour	2003	2011	X mark	check	check	X mark	X mark	X mark	X mark	
072	Alun Ffred Jones		Arfon	Plaid Cymru	2003	2016	X mark	check	check	check	X mark	X mark	X mark	
073	Laura Anne Jones		South Wales East	Conservative	2003	2007	X mark	check	check	check	check	check	check	As the next name on the Conservative Party list for South Wales East, on 16 June 2020 Jones succeeded Mohammad Asghar upon his death while in office. Defected to Reform UK on 22 July 2025
073	Laura Anne Jones		South Wales East	Conservative	2020	2025	X mark	check	check	check	check	check	check	As the next name on the Conservative Party list for South Wales East, on 16 June 2020 Jones succeeded Mohammad Asghar upon his death while in office. Defected to Reform UK on 22 July 2025
073	Laura Anne Jones		South Wales East	Reform UK	2025	2026	X mark	check	check	check	check	check	check	As the next name on the Conservative Party list for South Wales East, on 16 June 2020 Jones succeeded Mohammad Asghar upon his death while in office. Defected to Reform UK on 22 July 2025
073	Laura Anne Jones		Sir Fynwy Torfaen	Reform UK	2026	Present	X mark	check	check	check	check	check	check	As the next name on the Conservative Party list for South Wales East, on 16 June 2020 Jones succeeded Mohammad Asghar upon his death while in office. Defected to Reform UK on 22 July 2025
074	Sandy Mewies		Delyn	Labour	2003	2011	X mark	check	check	X mark	X mark	X mark	X mark	
075	Carl Sargeant		Alyn and Deeside	Labour	2003	2017	X mark	check	check	check	Orange tick	X mark	X mark	
076	Catherine Thomas		Llanelli	Labour	2003	2007	X mark	check	X mark	X mark	X mark	X mark	X mark	
077	Brynle Williams		North Wales	Conservative	2003	2011	X mark	check	check	X mark	X mark	X mark	X mark	
078	Leanne Wood		South Wales Central	Plaid Cymru	2003	2016	X mark	check	check	check	check	X mark	X mark	
078	Leanne Wood		Rhondda	Plaid Cymru	2016	2021	X mark	check	check	check	check	X mark	X mark	
079	Trish Law		Blaenau Gwent	Blaenau Gwent People's Voice	2006	2011	X mark	Orange tick	check	X mark	X mark	X mark	X mark	
080	Mohammad Asghar		South Wales East	Plaid Cymru	2007	2020	X mark	X mark	check	check	Orange tick	X mark	X mark	Defected from Plaid Cymru to Conservatives on 8 December 2009. Died while in office on 16 June 2020.
080	Mohammad Asghar		South Wales East	Conservative	2007	2020	X mark	X mark	check	check	Orange tick	X mark	X mark	Defected from Plaid Cymru to Conservatives on 8 December 2009. Died while in office on 16 June 2020.
081	Angela Burns		Carmarthen West and South Pembrokeshire	Conservative	2007	2021	X mark	X mark	check	check	check	X mark	X mark	
082	Alun Davies		Mid and West Wales	Labour	2007	2011	X mark	X mark	check	X mark	X mark	X mark	X mark	
082	Alun Davies		Blaenau Gwent	Labour	2011	2026	X mark	X mark	check	X mark	X mark	X mark	X mark	
083	Andrew RT Davies		South Wales Central	Conservative	2007	2026	X mark	X mark	check	check	check	check	check	
083	Andrew RT Davies		Pen-y-bont Bro Morgannwg	Conservative	2026	Present	X mark	X mark	check	check	check	check	check	
084	Paul Davies		Preseli Pembrokeshire	Conservative	2007	2026	X mark	X mark	check	check	check	check	check	
084	Paul Davies		Ceredigion Penfro	Conservative	2026	Present	X mark	X mark	check	check	check	check	check	
085	Nerys Evans		Mid and West Wales	Plaid Cymru	2007	2011	X mark	X mark	check	X mark	X mark	X mark	check	
085	Nerys Evans		Sir Gaerfyrddin	Plaid Cymru	2026	Present	X mark	X mark	check	X mark	X mark	X mark	check	
086	Chris Franks		South Wales Central	Plaid Cymru	2007	2011	X mark	X mark	check	X mark	X mark	X mark	X mark	
087	Lesley Griffiths		Wrexham	Labour	2007	2026	X mark	X mark	check	check	check	check	X mark	
088	Darren Millar		Clwyd West	Conservative	2007	2026	X mark	X mark	check	check	check	check	check	
088	Darren Millar		Clwyd	Conservative	2026	Present	X mark	X mark	check	check	check	check	check	
089	Nick Ramsay		Monmouth	Conservative	2007	2021	X mark	X mark	check	check	check	X mark	X mark	
090	Bethan Sayed		South Wales West	Plaid Cymru	2007	2021	X mark	X mark	check	check	check	X mark	X mark	
091	Joyce Watson		Mid and West Wales	Labour	2007	2026	X mark	X mark	check	check	check	check	X mark	
092	Veronica German		South Wales East	Liberal Democrats	2010	2011	X mark	X mark	Orange tick	X mark	X mark	X mark	X mark	
093	Mick Antoniw		Pontypridd	Labour	2011	2026	X mark	X mark	X mark	check	check	check	X mark	
094	Byron Davies		South Wales West	Conservative	2011	2015	X mark	X mark	X mark	Orange tick	X mark	X mark	X mark	
095	Keith Davies		Llanelli	Labour	2011	2016	X mark	X mark	X mark	check	X mark	X mark	X mark	
096	Suzy Davies		South Wales West	Conservative	2011	2021	X mark	X mark	X mark	check	check	X mark	X mark	
097	Mark Drakeford		Cardiff West	Labour	2011	2026	X mark	X mark	X mark	check	check	check	X mark	
098	Rebecca Evans		Mid and West Wales	Labour	2011	2016	X mark	X mark	X mark	check	check	check	X mark	
098	Rebecca Evans		Gower	Labour	2016	2026	X mark	X mark	X mark	check	check	check	X mark	
099	Janet Finch-Saunders		Aberconwy	Conservative	2011	2026	X mark	X mark	X mark	check	check	check	check	
099	Janet Finch-Saunders		Bangor Conwy Môn	Conservative	2026	Present	X mark	X mark	X mark	check	check	check	check	
100	Russell George		Montgomeryshire	Conservative	2011	2026	X mark	X mark	X mark	check	check	check	X mark	Sat as an independent from 14 April 2025
100	Russell George		Montgomeryshire	Independent	2011	2026	X mark	X mark	X mark	check	check	check	X mark	Sat as an independent from 14 April 2025
101	Vaughan Gething		Cardiff South and Penarth	Labour	2011	2026	X mark	X mark	X mark	check	check	check	X mark	
102	Llyr Gruffydd		North Wales	Plaid Cymru	2011	2026	X mark	X mark	X mark	check	check	check	check	
102	Llyr Gruffydd		Clwyd	Plaid Cymru	2026	Present	X mark	X mark	X mark	check	check	check	check	
103	Mike Hedges		Swansea East	Labour	2011	2026	X mark	X mark	X mark	check	check	check	check	
103	Mike Hedges		Gŵyr Abertawe	Labour	2026	Present	X mark	X mark	X mark	check	check	check	check	
104	Julie James		Swansea West	Labour	2011	2026	X mark	X mark	X mark	check	check	check	X mark	
105	Julie Morgan		Cardiff North	Labour	2011	2026	X mark	X mark	X mark	check	check	check	X mark	
106	William Powell		Mid and West Wales	Liberal Democrats	2011	2016	X mark	X mark	X mark	check	X mark	X mark	X mark	
107	Gwyn R Price		Islwyn	Labour	2011	2016	X mark	X mark	X mark	check	X mark	X mark	X mark	
108	Jenny Rathbone		Cardiff Central	Labour	2011	2026	X mark	X mark	X mark	check	check	check	X mark	
109	David Rees		Aberavon	Labour	2011	2026	X mark	X mark	X mark	check	check	check	X mark	
110	Aled Roberts		North Wales	Liberal Democrats	2011	2016	X mark	X mark	X mark	check	check	check	X mark	
111	Antoinette Sandbach		North Wales	Conservative	2011	2015	X mark	X mark	X mark	Orange tick	X mark	X mark	X mark	
112	Ken Skates		Clwyd South	Labour	2011	2026	X mark	X mark	X mark	check	check	check	check	
112	Ken Skates		Fflint Wrecsam	Labour	2026	Present	X mark	X mark	X mark	check	check	check	check	
113	Simon Thomas		Mid and West Wales	Plaid Cymru	2011	2018	X mark	X mark	X mark	check	Orange tick	X mark	X mark	Resigned 25 July 2018
114	Lindsay Whittle		South Wales East	Plaid Cymru	2011	2016	X mark	X mark	X mark	check	X mark	Orange tick	check	
114	Lindsay Whittle		Caerphilly	Plaid Cymru	2025	2026	X mark	X mark	X mark	check	X mark	Orange tick	check	
114	Lindsay Whittle		Blaenau Gwent Caerffili Rhymni	Plaid Cymru	2026	Present	X mark	X mark	X mark	check	X mark	Orange tick	check	
115	Eluned Parrott		South Wales Central	Liberal Democrats	2011	2016	X mark	X mark	X mark	Orange tick	X mark	X mark	X mark	
116	Rhun ap Iorwerth		Ynys Môn	Plaid Cymru	2013	2026	X mark	X mark	X mark	Orange tick	check	check	check	
116	Rhun ap Iorwerth		Bangor Conwy Môn	Plaid Cymru	2026	Present	X mark	X mark	X mark	Orange tick	check	check	check	
117	Altaf Hussain		South Wales West	Conservative	2015	2016	X mark	X mark	X mark	Orange tick	X mark	check	X mark	
117	Altaf Hussain		South Wales West	Conservative	2021	2026	X mark	X mark	X mark	Orange tick	X mark	check	X mark	
118	Janet Haworth		North Wales	Conservative	2015	2016	X mark	X mark	X mark	Orange tick	X mark	X mark	X mark	
119	Gareth Bennett		South Wales Central	UKIP	2016	2021	X mark	X mark	X mark	X mark	check	X mark	X mark	Sat as an independent from 7 November 2019 until 24 June 2020, when they joined the Abolish the Welsh Assembly Party.
119	Gareth Bennett		South Wales Central	Independent	2016	2021	X mark	X mark	X mark	X mark	check	X mark	X mark	Sat as an independent from 7 November 2019 until 24 June 2020, when they joined the Abolish the Welsh Assembly Party.
119	Gareth Bennett		South Wales Central	Abolish the Welsh Assembly	2016	2021	X mark	X mark	X mark	X mark	check	X mark	X mark	Sat as an independent from 7 November 2019 until 24 June 2020, when they joined the Abolish the Welsh Assembly Party.
120	Hannah Blythyn		Delyn	Labour	2016	2026	X mark	X mark	X mark	X mark	check	check	X mark	
121	Dawn Bowden		Merthyr Tidfil and Rhymney	Labour	2016	2026	X mark	X mark	X mark	X mark	check	check	X mark	
122	Michelle Brown		North Wales	UKIP	2016	2021	X mark	X mark	X mark	X mark	check	X mark	X mark	Sat as an independent from 26 March 2019
122	Michelle Brown		North Wales	Independent	2016	2021	X mark	X mark	X mark	X mark	check	X mark	X mark	Sat as an independent from 26 March 2019
123	Jayne Bryant		Newport West	Labour	2016	2026	X mark	X mark	X mark	X mark	check	check	check	
123	Jayne Bryant		Casnewydd Islwyn	Labour	2026	Present	X mark	X mark	X mark	X mark	check	check	check	
124	Hefin David		Caerphilly	Labour	2016	2025	X mark	X mark	X mark	X mark	check	Orange tick	X mark	Died in office on 12 August 2025.
125	Nathan Gill		North Wales	UKIP	2016	2017	X mark	X mark	X mark	X mark	Orange tick	X mark	X mark	Left UKIP group to sit as an independent from 29 July 2016. Resigned as an AM on 27 December 2017
125	Nathan Gill		North Wales	Independent	2016	2017	X mark	X mark	X mark	X mark	Orange tick	X mark	X mark	Left UKIP group to sit as an independent from 29 July 2016. Resigned as an AM on 27 December 2017
126	Siân Gwenllian		Arfon	Plaid Cymru	2016	2026	X mark	X mark	X mark	X mark	check	check	check	
126	Siân Gwenllian		Gwynedd Maldwyn	Plaid Cymru	2026	Present	X mark	X mark	X mark	X mark	check	check	check	
127	Neil Hamilton		Mid and West Wales	UKIP	2016	2021	X mark	X mark	X mark	X mark	check	X mark	X mark	
128	Vikki Howells		Cynon Valley	Labour	2016	2026	X mark	X mark	X mark	X mark	check	check	check	
128	Vikki Howells		Pontypridd Cynon Merthyr	Labour	2026	Present	X mark	X mark	X mark	X mark	check	check	check	
129	Huw Irranca-Davies		Ogmore	Labour	2016	2026	X mark	X mark	X mark	X mark	check	check	check	
129	Huw Irranca-Davies		Afan Ogwr Rhondda	Labour	2026	Present	X mark	X mark	X mark	X mark	check	check	check	
130	Caroline Jones		South Wales West	UKIP	2016	2021	X mark	X mark	X mark	X mark	check	X mark	X mark	Left UKIP in September 2018 and joined the Brexit Party in May 2019. Sat again as an independent from August 2020.
130	Caroline Jones		South Wales West	Independent	2016	2021	X mark	X mark	X mark	X mark	check	X mark	X mark	Left UKIP in September 2018 and joined the Brexit Party in May 2019. Sat again as an independent from August 2020.
130	Caroline Jones		South Wales West	Brexit Party	2016	2021	X mark	X mark	X mark	X mark	check	X mark	X mark	Left UKIP in September 2018 and joined the Brexit Party in May 2019. Sat again as an independent from August 2020.
130	Caroline Jones		South Wales West	Independent	2016	2021	X mark	X mark	X mark	X mark	check	X mark	X mark	Left UKIP in September 2018 and joined the Brexit Party in May 2019. Sat again as an independent from August 2020.
131	Steffan Lewis		South Wales East	Plaid Cymru	2016	2018	X mark	X mark	X mark	X mark	Orange tick	X mark	X mark	
132	Neil McEvoy		South Wales Central	Plaid Cymru	2016	2021	X mark	X mark	X mark	X mark	check	X mark	X mark	Expelled from Plaid Cymru group 17 January 2018. Set up the Welsh National Party in 2020.
132	Neil McEvoy		South Wales Central	Independent	2016	2021	X mark	X mark	X mark	X mark	check	X mark	X mark	Expelled from Plaid Cymru group 17 January 2018. Set up the Welsh National Party in 2020.
132	Neil McEvoy		South Wales Central	Welsh National Party	2016	2021	X mark	X mark	X mark	X mark	check	X mark	X mark	Expelled from Plaid Cymru group 17 January 2018. Set up the Welsh National Party in 2020.
133	Jeremy Miles		Neath	Labour	2016	2026	X mark	X mark	X mark	X mark	check	check	X mark	
134	Eluned Morgan		Mid and West Wales	Labour	2016	2026	X mark	X mark	X mark	X mark	check	check	X mark	
135	Rhianon Passmore		Islwyn	Labour	2016	2026	X mark	X mark	X mark	X mark	check	check	X mark	
136	Adam Price		Carmarthen East and Dinefwr	Plaid Cymru	2016	2026	X mark	X mark	X mark	X mark	check	check	check	
136	Adam Price		Sir Gaerfyrddin	Plaid Cymru	2026	Present	X mark	X mark	X mark	X mark	check	check	check	
137	Mark Reckless		South Wales East	UKIP	2016	2021	X mark	X mark	X mark	X mark	check	X mark	X mark	Defected from UKIP to the Conservatives on 6 April 2017. Sat as an independent from 14 April 2019 until joining the Brexit Party in May 2019. Defected to the Abolish the Welsh Assembly Party on 19 October 2020.
137	Mark Reckless		South Wales East	Conservative	2016	2021	X mark	X mark	X mark	X mark	check	X mark	X mark	Defected from UKIP to the Conservatives on 6 April 2017. Sat as an independent from 14 April 2019 until joining the Brexit Party in May 2019. Defected to the Abolish the Welsh Assembly Party on 19 October 2020.
137	Mark Reckless		South Wales East	Independent	2016	2021	X mark	X mark	X mark	X mark	check	X mark	X mark	Defected from UKIP to the Conservatives on 6 April 2017. Sat as an independent from 14 April 2019 until joining the Brexit Party in May 2019. Defected to the Abolish the Welsh Assembly Party on 19 October 2020.
137	Mark Reckless		South Wales East	Brexit Party	2016	2021	X mark	X mark	X mark	X mark	check	X mark	X mark	Defected from UKIP to the Conservatives on 6 April 2017. Sat as an independent from 14 April 2019 until joining the Brexit Party in May 2019. Defected to the Abolish the Welsh Assembly Party on 19 October 2020.
137	Mark Reckless		South Wales East	Abolish the Welsh Assembly	2016	2021	X mark	X mark	X mark	X mark	check	X mark	X mark	Defected from UKIP to the Conservatives on 6 April 2017. Sat as an independent from 14 April 2019 until joining the Brexit Party in May 2019. Defected to the Abolish the Welsh Assembly Party on 19 October 2020.
138	David Rowlands		South Wales East	UKIP	2016	2021	X mark	X mark	X mark	X mark	check	X mark	X mark	Left UKIP in September 2018 and joined the Brexit Party in May 2019. Sat as an independent from 16 October 2020.
138	David Rowlands		South Wales East	Brexit Party	2016	2021	X mark	X mark	X mark	X mark	check	X mark	X mark	Left UKIP in September 2018 and joined the Brexit Party in May 2019. Sat as an independent from 16 October 2020.
138	David Rowlands		South Wales East	Independent	2016	2021	X mark	X mark	X mark	X mark	check	X mark	X mark	Left UKIP in September 2018 and joined the Brexit Party in May 2019. Sat as an independent from 16 October 2020.
139	Lee Waters		Llanelli	Labour	2016	2026	X mark	X mark	X mark	X mark	check	check	X mark	
140	Mandy Jones		North Wales	UKIP	2017	2021	X mark	X mark	X mark	X mark	Orange tick	X mark	X mark	Returned as a UKIP member on 28 Dec 2017, but refused entry to the UKIP group on 9 Jan 2018. Sat as an independent until joining Brexit Party in May 2019, but returned to being an independent on 16 October 2020.
140	Mandy Jones		North Wales	Independent	2017	2021	X mark	X mark	X mark	X mark	Orange tick	X mark	X mark	Returned as a UKIP member on 28 Dec 2017, but refused entry to the UKIP group on 9 Jan 2018. Sat as an independent until joining Brexit Party in May 2019, but returned to being an independent on 16 October 2020.
140	Mandy Jones		North Wales	Brexit Party	2017	2021	X mark	X mark	X mark	X mark	Orange tick	X mark	X mark	Returned as a UKIP member on 28 Dec 2017, but refused entry to the UKIP group on 9 Jan 2018. Sat as an independent until joining Brexit Party in May 2019, but returned to being an independent on 16 October 2020.
140	Mandy Jones		North Wales	Independent	2017	2021	X mark	X mark	X mark	X mark	Orange tick	X mark	X mark	Returned as a UKIP member on 28 Dec 2017, but refused entry to the UKIP group on 9 Jan 2018. Sat as an independent until joining Brexit Party in May 2019, but returned to being an independent on 16 October 2020.
141	Jack Sargeant		Alyn and Deeside	Labour	2018	2026	X mark	X mark	X mark	X mark	Orange tick	check	X mark	Elected at a by-election following the death of Carl Sargeant.
142	Delyth Jewell		South Wales East	Plaid Cymru	2019	2026	X mark	X mark	X mark	X mark	Orange tick	check	check	
142	Delyth Jewell		Blaenau Gwent Caerffili Rhymni	Plaid Cymru	2026	Present	X mark	X mark	X mark	X mark	Orange tick	check	check	
143	Mabon ap Gwynfor		Dwyfor Meirionnydd	Plaid Cymru	2021	2026	X mark	X mark	X mark	X mark	X mark	check	check	
143	Mabon ap Gwynfor		Gwynedd Maldwyn	Plaid Cymru	2026	Present	X mark	X mark	X mark	X mark	X mark	check	check	
144	Rhys ab Owen		South Wales Central	Plaid Cymru	2021	2026	X mark	X mark	X mark	X mark	X mark	check	X mark	Sat as an independent from 8 November 2022.
144	Rhys ab Owen		South Wales Central	Independent	2021	2026	X mark	X mark	X mark	X mark	X mark	check	X mark	Sat as an independent from 8 November 2022.
145	Natasha Asghar		South Wales East	Conservative	2021	2026	X mark	X mark	X mark	X mark	X mark	check	check	
145	Natasha Asghar		Casnewydd Islwyn	Conservative	2026	Present	X mark	X mark	X mark	X mark	X mark	check	check	
146	Cefin Campbell		Mid and West Wales	Plaid Cymru	2021	2026	X mark	X mark	X mark	X mark	X mark	check	check	
146	Cefin Campbell		Sir Gaerfyrddin	Plaid Cymru	2026	Present	X mark	X mark	X mark	X mark	X mark	check	check	
147	Gareth Davies		Vale of Clwyd	Conservative	2021	2026	X mark	X mark	X mark	X mark	X mark	check	X mark	
148	Jane Dodds		Mid and West Wales	Liberal Democrats	2021	2026	X mark	X mark	X mark	X mark	X mark	check	check	
148	Jane Dodds		Brycheiniog Tawe Nedd	Liberal Democrats	2026	Present	X mark	X mark	X mark	X mark	X mark	check	check	
149	James Evans		Brecon and Radnorshire	Conservative	2021	2026	X mark	X mark	X mark	X mark	X mark	check	check	Defected to Reform UK in February 2026
149	James Evans		Brecon and Radnorshire	Reform UK	2026	2026	X mark	X mark	X mark	X mark	X mark	check	check	Defected to Reform UK in February 2026
149	James Evans		Brycheiniog Tawe Nedd	Reform UK	2026	Present	X mark	X mark	X mark	X mark	X mark	check	check	Defected to Reform UK in February 2026
150	Luke Fletcher		South Wales West	Plaid Cymru	2021	2026	X mark	X mark	X mark	X mark	X mark	check	X mark	
151	Peter Fox		Monmouth	Conservative	2021	2026	X mark	X mark	X mark	X mark	X mark	check	check	
151	Peter Fox		Sir Fynwy Torfaen	Conservative	2026	Present	X mark	X mark	X mark	X mark	X mark	check	check	
152	Heledd Fychan		South Wales Central	Plaid Cymru	2021	2026	X mark	X mark	X mark	X mark	X mark	check	check	
152	Heledd Fychan		Pontypridd Cynon Merthyr	Plaid Cymru	2026	Present	X mark	X mark	X mark	X mark	X mark	check	check	
153	Tom Giffard		South Wales West	Conservative	2021	2026	X mark	X mark	X mark	X mark	X mark	check	X mark	
154	Peredur Owen Griffiths		South Wales East	Plaid Cymru	2021	2026	X mark	X mark	X mark	X mark	X mark	check	check	
154	Peredur Owen Griffiths		Casnewydd Islwyn	Plaid Cymru	2026	Present	X mark	X mark	X mark	X mark	X mark	check	check	
155	Joel James		South Wales Central	Conservative	2021	2026	X mark	X mark	X mark	X mark	X mark	check	X mark	
156	Samuel Kurtz		Carmarthen West and South Pembrokeshire	Conservative	2021	2026	X mark	X mark	X mark	X mark	X mark	check	X mark	
157	Sarah Murphy		Bridgend	Labour	2021	2026	X mark	X mark	X mark	X mark	X mark	check	check	
157	Sarah Murphy		Pen-y-bont Bro Morgannwg	Labour	2026	Present	X mark	X mark	X mark	X mark	X mark	check	check	
158	Sam Rowlands		North Wales	Conservative	2021	2026	X mark	X mark	X mark	X mark	X mark	check	check	
158	Sam Rowlands		Fflint Wrecsam	Conservative	2026	Present	X mark	X mark	X mark	X mark	X mark	check	check	
159	Carolyn Thomas		North Wales	Labour	2021	2026	X mark	X mark	X mark	X mark	X mark	check	X mark	
160	Buffy Williams		Rhondda	Labour	2021	2026	X mark	X mark	X mark	X mark	X mark	check	X mark	
161	Sioned Williams		South Wales West	Plaid Cymru	2021	2026	X mark	X mark	X mark	X mark	X mark	check	check	
161	Sioned Williams		Brycheiniog Tawe Nedd	Plaid Cymru	2026	Present	X mark	X mark	X mark	X mark	X mark	check	check	
162	Lyn Ackerman		Casnewydd Islwyn	Plaid Cymru	2026	Present	X mark	X mark	X mark	X mark	X mark	X mark	check	
163	Zaynub Akbar		Caerdydd Ffynnon Taf	Plaid Cymru	2026	Present	X mark	X mark	X mark	X mark	X mark	X mark	check	
164	Claire Archibald		Ceredigion Penfro	Reform UK	2026	Present	X mark	X mark	X mark	X mark	X mark	X mark	check	
165	Steve Bayliss		Afan Ogwr Rhondda	Reform UK	2026	Present	X mark	X mark	X mark	X mark	X mark	X mark	check	
166	Gareth Beer		Sir Gaerfyrddin	Reform UK	2026	Present	X mark	X mark	X mark	X mark	X mark	X mark	check	
167	Beca Brown		Gwynedd Maldwyn	Plaid Cymru	2026	Present	X mark	X mark	X mark	X mark	X mark	X mark	check	
168	Anna Brychan		Caerdydd Penarth	Plaid Cymru	2026	Present	X mark	X mark	X mark	X mark	X mark	X mark	check	
169	Nick Carter		Caerdydd Ffynnon Taf	Plaid Cymru	2026	Present	X mark	X mark	X mark	X mark	X mark	X mark	check	
170	John Clark		Bangor Conwy Môn	Reform UK	2026	Present	X mark	X mark	X mark	X mark	X mark	X mark	check	
171	Carmelo Colasanto		Sir Gaerfyrddin	Reform UK	2026	Present	X mark	X mark	X mark	X mark	X mark	X mark	check	
172	Sarah Cooper-Lesadd		Pen-y-bont Bro Morgannwg	Reform UK	2026	2026	X mark	X mark	X mark	X mark	X mark	X mark	check	Defected to Plaid Cymru on 15 September 2026
172	Sarah Cooper-Lesadd		Pen-y-bont Bro Morgannwg	Plaid Cymru	2026	Present	X mark	X mark	X mark	X mark	X mark	X mark	check	Defected to Plaid Cymru on 15 September 2026
173	Alun Cox		Afan Ogwr Rhondda	Plaid Cymru	2026	Present	X mark	X mark	X mark	X mark	X mark	X mark	check	
174	Sara Crowley		Pontypridd Cynon Merthyr	Plaid Cymru	2026	Present	X mark	X mark	X mark	X mark	X mark	X mark	check	
175	Catherine Cullen		Blaenau Gwent Caerffili Rhymni	Reform UK	2026	Present	X mark	X mark	X mark	X mark	X mark	X mark	check	
176	Donna Cushing		Sir Fynwy Torfaen	Plaid Cymru	2026	Present	X mark	X mark	X mark	X mark	X mark	X mark	check	
177	Dafydd Trystan Davies		Caerdydd Ffynnon Taf	Plaid Cymru	2026	Present	X mark	X mark	X mark	X mark	X mark	X mark	check	
178	John Davies		Gŵyr Abertawe	Plaid Cymru	2026	Present	X mark	X mark	X mark	X mark	X mark	X mark	check	
179	Sarah Edwards		Sir Gaerfyrddin	Reform UK	2026	Present	X mark	X mark	X mark	X mark	X mark	X mark	check	
180	Safa Elhassan		Gŵyr Abertawe	Plaid Cymru	2026	Present	X mark	X mark	X mark	X mark	X mark	X mark	check	
181	Louise Emery		Clwyd	Reform UK	2026	Present	X mark	X mark	X mark	X mark	X mark	X mark	check	
182	Cristiana Emsley		Fflint Wrecsam	Reform UK	2026	Present	X mark	X mark	X mark	X mark	X mark	X mark	check	
183	Sera Evans		Afan Ogwr Rhondda	Plaid Cymru	2026	Present	X mark	X mark	X mark	X mark	X mark	X mark	check	
184	Kerry Ferguson		Ceredigion Penfro	Plaid Cymru	2026	Present	X mark	X mark	X mark	X mark	X mark	X mark	check	
185	Leticia Gonzalez		Caerdydd Penarth	Plaid Cymru	2026	Present	X mark	X mark	X mark	X mark	X mark	X mark	check	
186	Andrew Griffin		Gwynedd Maldwyn	Reform UK	2026	Present	X mark	X mark	X mark	X mark	X mark	X mark	check	
187	Carrie Harper		Fflint Wrecsam	Plaid Cymru	2026	Present	X mark	X mark	X mark	X mark	X mark	X mark	check	
188	Mark Hooper		Pen-y-bont Bro Morgannwg	Plaid Cymru	2026	Present	X mark	X mark	X mark	X mark	X mark	X mark	check	
189	David Hughes		Pontypridd Cynon Merthyr	Reform UK	2026	Present	X mark	X mark	X mark	X mark	X mark	X mark	check	
190	Helen Jenner		Bangor Conwy Môn	Reform UK	2026	Present	X mark	X mark	X mark	X mark	X mark	X mark	check	
191	Claire Johnson-Wood		Gwynedd Maldwyn	Reform UK	2026	Present	X mark	X mark	X mark	X mark	X mark	X mark	check	
192	Marc Jones		Fflint Wrecsam	Plaid Cymru	2026	Present	X mark	X mark	X mark	X mark	X mark	X mark	check	
193	Matthew Jones		Sir Fynwy Torfaen	Plaid Cymru	2026	Present	X mark	X mark	X mark	X mark	X mark	X mark	check	
194	Joshua Kim		Blaenau Gwent Caerffili Rhymni	Reform UK	2026	Present	X mark	X mark	X mark	X mark	X mark	X mark	check	
195	Paul Marr		Ceredigion Penfro	Reform UK	2026	Present	X mark	X mark	X mark	X mark	X mark	X mark	check	
196	Kiera Marshall		Caerdydd Penarth	Plaid Cymru	2026	Present	X mark	X mark	X mark	X mark	X mark	X mark	check	
197	Becca Martin		Clwyd	Plaid Cymru	2026	Present	X mark	X mark	X mark	X mark	X mark	X mark	check	
198	Joe Martin		Caerdydd Penarth	Reform UK	2026	Present	X mark	X mark	X mark	X mark	X mark	X mark	check	
199	Adrian Mason		Clwyd	Reform UK	2026	Present	X mark	X mark	X mark	X mark	X mark	X mark	check	
200	Iain McIntosh		Brycheiniog Tawe Nedd	Reform UK	2026	Present	X mark	X mark	X mark	X mark	X mark	X mark	check	
201	Benjamin McKenna		Afan Ogwr Rhondda	Reform UK	2026	Present	X mark	X mark	X mark	X mark	X mark	X mark	check	
202	Lis McLean		Pontypridd Cynon Merthyr	Plaid Cymru	2026	Present	X mark	X mark	X mark	X mark	X mark	X mark	check	
203	David Mills		Brycheiniog Tawe Nedd	Reform UK	2026	Present	X mark	X mark	X mark	X mark	X mark	X mark	check	
204	Thomas Montgomery		Clwyd	Reform UK	2026	Present	X mark	X mark	X mark	X mark	X mark	X mark	check	
205	Anna Nicholl		Ceredigion Penfro	Plaid Cymru	2026	Present	X mark	X mark	X mark	X mark	X mark	X mark	check	
206	Francesca O'Brien		Gŵyr Abertawe	Reform UK	2026	Present	X mark	X mark	X mark	X mark	X mark	X mark	check	
207	Jason O'Connell		Pontypridd Cynon Merthyr	Reform UK	2026	Present	X mark	X mark	X mark	X mark	X mark	X mark	check	
208	Cai Parry-Jones		Caerdydd Ffynnon Taf	Reform UK	2026	Present	X mark	X mark	X mark	X mark	X mark	X mark	check	
209	Rebeca Phillips		Brycheiniog Tawe Nedd	Plaid Cymru	2026	Present	X mark	X mark	X mark	X mark	X mark	X mark	check	
210	Llŷr Powell		Blaenau Gwent Caerffili Rhymni	Reform UK	2026	Present	X mark	X mark	X mark	X mark	X mark	X mark	check	
211	Sarah Rees		Pen-y-bont Bro Morgannwg	Plaid Cymru	2026	Present	X mark	X mark	X mark	X mark	X mark	X mark	check	
212	Paul Rock		Caerdydd Ffynnon Taf	Green	2026	Present	X mark	X mark	X mark	X mark	X mark	X mark	check	
213	Steven Rodaway		Gŵyr Abertawe	Reform UK	2026	Present	X mark	X mark	X mark	X mark	X mark	X mark	check	
214	Mair Rowlands		Bangor Conwy Môn	Plaid Cymru	2026	Present	X mark	X mark	X mark	X mark	X mark	X mark	check	
215	Niamh Salkeld		Blaenau Gwent Caerffili Rhymni	Plaid Cymru	2026	Present	X mark	X mark	X mark	X mark	X mark	X mark	check	
216	Stephen Senior		Sir Fynwy Torfaen	Reform UK	2026	Present	X mark	X mark	X mark	X mark	X mark	X mark	check	
217	Anthony Slaughter		Caerdydd Penarth	Green	2026	Present	X mark	X mark	X mark	X mark	X mark	X mark	check	
218	Elyn Stephens		Afan Ogwr Rhondda	Plaid Cymru	2026	Present	X mark	X mark	X mark	X mark	X mark	X mark	check	
219	Shav Taj		Caerdydd Ffynnon Taf	Labour	2026	Present	X mark	X mark	X mark	X mark	X mark	X mark	check	
220	Dan Thomas		Casnewydd Islwyn	Reform UK	2026	Present	X mark	X mark	X mark	X mark	X mark	X mark	check	
221	Gaz Thomas		Pen-y-bont Bro Morgannwg	Reform UK	2026	Present	X mark	X mark	X mark	X mark	X mark	X mark	check	
222	Huw Thomas		Caerdydd Penarth	Labour	2026	Present	X mark	X mark	X mark	X mark	X mark	X mark	check	
223	Elwyn Vaughan		Gwynedd Maldwyn	Plaid Cymru	2026	Present	X mark	X mark	X mark	X mark	X mark	X mark	check	
224	Elfed Williams		Bangor Conwy Môn	Plaid Cymru	2026	Present	X mark	X mark	X mark	X mark	X mark	X mark	check	
225	Gwyn Williams		Gŵyr Abertawe	Plaid Cymru	2026	Present	X mark	X mark	X mark	X mark	X mark	X mark	check	
226	Nigel Williams		Fflint Wrecsam	Reform UK	2026	Present	X mark	X mark	X mark	X mark	X mark	X mark	check	
227	Art Wright		Casnewydd Islwyn	Reform UK	2026	Present	X mark	X mark	X mark	X mark	X mark	X mark	check	

== See also ==
- Members of the 1st National Assembly for Wales
- Members of the 2nd National Assembly for Wales
- Members of the 3rd National Assembly for Wales
- Members of the 4th National Assembly for Wales
- Members of the 5th National Assembly for Wales
- Members of the 6th Senedd
- Members of the 7th Senedd
- List of by-elections to the Senedd
- Regional member changes to the Senedd
