= List of Plaid Cymru MSs =

This list of Plaid Cymru MSs (Members of the Senedd) includes all members of the Senedd elected under Plaid Cymru.

Name	Constituency/Region	Served from	Served to	Term length	Days (total)
Elin Jones	Ceredigion then Ceredigion Penfro	6 May 1999	present	27 years, 4 months and 14 days	9,999
Leanne Wood	South Wales Central then Rhondda	1 May 2003	6 May 2021	18 years 5 days	6,580
Dafydd Elis-Thomas	Meirionnydd Nant Conwy then Dwyfor Meirionnydd	6 May 1999	14 October 2016 (Note: Day he left Plaid Cymru to sit as an independent MS)	17 years 5 month 8 days	6,371
Dai Lloyd	South Wales West	6 May 1999	5 May 2011	11 years 11 months 29 days	6,208
Dai Lloyd	South Wales West	6 May 2016	6 May 2021	5 years	6,208
Rhodri Glyn Thomas	Carmarthen East and Dinefwr	6 May 1999	4 April 2016	16 years 11 months	6,180
Jocelyn Davies	South Wales East	6 May 1999	4 April 2016	16 years 11 months	6,180
Llyr Gruffydd	North Wales then Clwyd	6 May 2011	present	15 years, 4 months and 14 days	5,616
Helen Mary Jones	Llanelli & Mid and West Wales	6 May 1999	5 May 2011	11 years 11 months 29 days	5,383
Helen Mary Jones	Mid and West Wales	2 August 2018	6 May 2021	2 years, 8 months, 27 days	5,383
Ieuan Wyn Jones	Ynys Môn	6 May 1999	20 June 2013	14 years 1 month 14 days	5,159
Bethan Sayed	South Wales West	3 May 2007	29 April 2021	13 years, 11 months, 26 days	5,110
Rhun ap Iorwerth	Ynys Môn then Bangor Conwy Môn	2 August 2013	present	13 years, 1 month and 18 days	4,797
Alun Ffred Jones	Caernarfon then Arfon	1 May 2003	4 April 2016	12 years 11 months 3 days	4,722
Janet Ryder	North Wales	6 May 1999	5 May 2011	12 years 1 day	4,384
Siân Gwenllian	Arfon then Gwynedd Maldwyn	6 May 2016	present	10 years, 4 months and 14 days	3,789
Adam Price	Carmarthen East and Dinefwr then Sir Gaerfyrddin	6 May 2016	present	10 years, 4 months and 14 days	3,789
Owen John Thomas	South Wales Central	6 May 1999	3 May 2007	7 years 11 months 29 days	2,921
Gareth Jones	Conwy	6 May 1999	1 May 2003	7 years 11 months 29 days	2,921
Gareth Jones	Aberconwy	3 May 2007	5 May 2011	7 years 11 months 29 days	2,921
Janet Davies	South Wales West	6 May 1999	3 May 2007	7 years 11 months 29 days	2,921
Delyth Jewell	South Wales East then Blaenau Gwent Caerffili Rhymni	8 February 2019	present	7 years, 7 months and 12 days	2,781
Simon Thomas	Mid and West Wales	6 May 2011	25 July 2018	7 years 2 months 19 days	2,637
Lindsay Whittle	South Wales East	6 May 2011	5 April 2016	4 years 10 months 30 days	2,126
Lindsay Whittle	Caerphilly then Blaenau Gwent Caerffili Rhymni	23 October 2025	present	10 months and 28 days	2,126
Mabon ap Gwynfor	Dwyfor Meirionnydd then Gwynedd Maldwyn	6 May 2021	present	5 years, 4 months and 14 days	1,963
Cefin Campbell	Mid and West Wales then Sir Gaerfyrddin	6 May 2021	present	5 years, 4 months and 14 days	1,963
Peredur Owen Griffiths	South Wales East then Casnewydd Islwyn	6 May 2021	present	5 years, 4 months and 14 days	1,963
Heledd Fychan	South Wales Central then Pontypridd Cynon Merthyr	6 May 2021	present	5 years, 4 months and 14 days	1,963
Sioned Williams	South Wales West then Brycheiniog Tawe Nedd	6 May 2021	present	5 years, 4 months and 14 days	1,963
Luke Fletcher	South Wales West	6 May 2021	7 April 2026	4 years 11 months 1 day	1,797
Nerys Evans	Mid and West Wales	3 May 2007	31 March 2011	3 years 10 months 28 days	1,565
Nerys Evans	Sir Gaerfyrddin	8 May 2026	present	4 months and 14 days	1,565
Chris Franks	South Wales Central	3 May 2007	5 May 2011	4 years 2 days	1,463
Geraint Davies	Rhondda	6 May 1999	1 May 2003	3 years 11 months 27 days	1,458
Brian Hancock	Islwyn	6 May 1999	1 May 2003	3 years 11 months 27 days	1,458
Pauline Jarman	South Wales Central	6 May 1999	1 May 2003	3 years 11 months 27 days	1,458
Dafydd Wigley	Caernarfon	6 May 1999	1 May 2003	3 years 11 months 27 days	1,458
Phil Williams	South Wales East	6 May 1999	1 May 2003	3 years 11 months 27 days	1,458
Cynog Dafis	Mid and West Wales	6 May 1999	1 May 2003	3 years 11 months 27 days	1,458
Steffan Lewis	South Wales East	6 May 2016	11 Jan 2019	2 years, 8 months, 5 days	980
Mohammad Asghar	South Wales East	3 May 2007	8 December 2009 (Note: Day he defected from Plaid Cymru and joined the Conservatives)	2 years 7 months 5 days	950
Neil McEvoy	South Wales Central	6 May 2016	16 Jan 2018 (Note: Day he was permanently expelled as a Plaid Cymru MS)	1 year 8 months 10 days	620
Rhys ab Owen	South Wales Central	6 May 2021	8 November 2022	1 year, 6 months, 2 days	551
Lyn Ackerman	Casnewydd Islwyn	6 May 2026	present	4 months and 14 days	137
Zaynub Akbar	Caerdydd Ffynnon Taf	6 May 2026	present	4 months and 14 days	137
Beca Brown	Gwynedd Maldwyn	6 May 2026	present	4 months and 14 days	137
Anna Brychan	Caerdydd Penarth	6 May 2026	present	4 months and 14 days	137
Nick Carter	Caerdydd Ffynnon Taf	6 May 2026	present	4 months and 14 days	137
Alun Cox	Afan Ogwr Rhondda	6 May 2026	present	4 months and 14 days	137
Sara Crowley	Pontypridd Cynon Merthyr	6 May 2026	present	4 months and 14 days	137
Donna Cushing	Sir Fynwy Torfaen	6 May 2026	present	4 months and 14 days	137
Dafydd Trystan Davies	Caerdydd Ffynnon Taf	6 May 2026	present	4 months and 14 days	137
John Davies	Gŵyr Abertawe	6 May 2026	present	4 months and 14 days	137
Safa Elhassan	Gŵyr Abertawe	6 May 2026	present	4 months and 14 days	137
Sera Evans	Afan Ogwr Rhondda	6 May 2026	present	4 months and 14 days	137
Kerry Ferguson	Ceredigion Penfro	6 May 2026	present	4 months and 14 days	137
Leticia Gonzalez	Caerdydd Penarth	6 May 2026	present	4 months and 14 days	137
Carrie Harper	Fflint Wrecsam	6 May 2026	present	4 months and 14 days	137
Mark Hooper	Pen-y-bont Bro Morgannwg	6 May 2026	present	4 months and 14 days	137
Marc Jones	Fflint Wrecsam	6 May 2026	present	4 months and 14 days	137
Matthew Jones	Sir Fynwy Torfaen	6 May 2026	present	4 months and 14 days	137
Kiera Marshall	Caerdydd Penarth	6 May 2026	present	4 months and 14 days	137
Becca Martin	Clwyd	6 May 2026	present	4 months and 14 days	137
Lis McLean	Pontypridd Cynon Merthyr	6 May 2026	present	4 months and 14 days	137
Anna Nicholl	Ceredigion Penfro	6 May 2026	present	4 months and 14 days	137
Rebeca Phillips	Brycheiniog Tawe Nedd	6 May 2026	present	4 months and 14 days	137
Sarah Rees	Pen-y-bont Bro Morgannwg	6 May 2026	present	4 months and 14 days	137
Mair Rowlands	Bangor Conwy Môn	6 May 2026	present	4 months and 14 days	137
Niamh Salkeld	Blaenau Gwent Caerffili Rhymni	6 May 2026	present	4 months and 14 days	137
Elyn Stephens	Afan Ogwr Rhondda	6 May 2026	present	4 months and 14 days	137
Elwyn Vaughan	Gwynedd Maldwyn	6 May 2026	present	4 months and 14 days	137
Gwyn Williams	Gŵyr Abertawe	6 May 2026	present	4 months and 14 days	137
Sarah Cooper-Lesadd	Pen-y-bont Bro Morgannwg	15 September 2026 (Note: Day she defected from Reform UK and joined Plaid Cymru)	present	5 days	5

== See also ==
- List of Plaid Cymru MPs
