= 7th Senedd =

Legislature elected in 2026

←	6th Senedd	8th Senedd	→
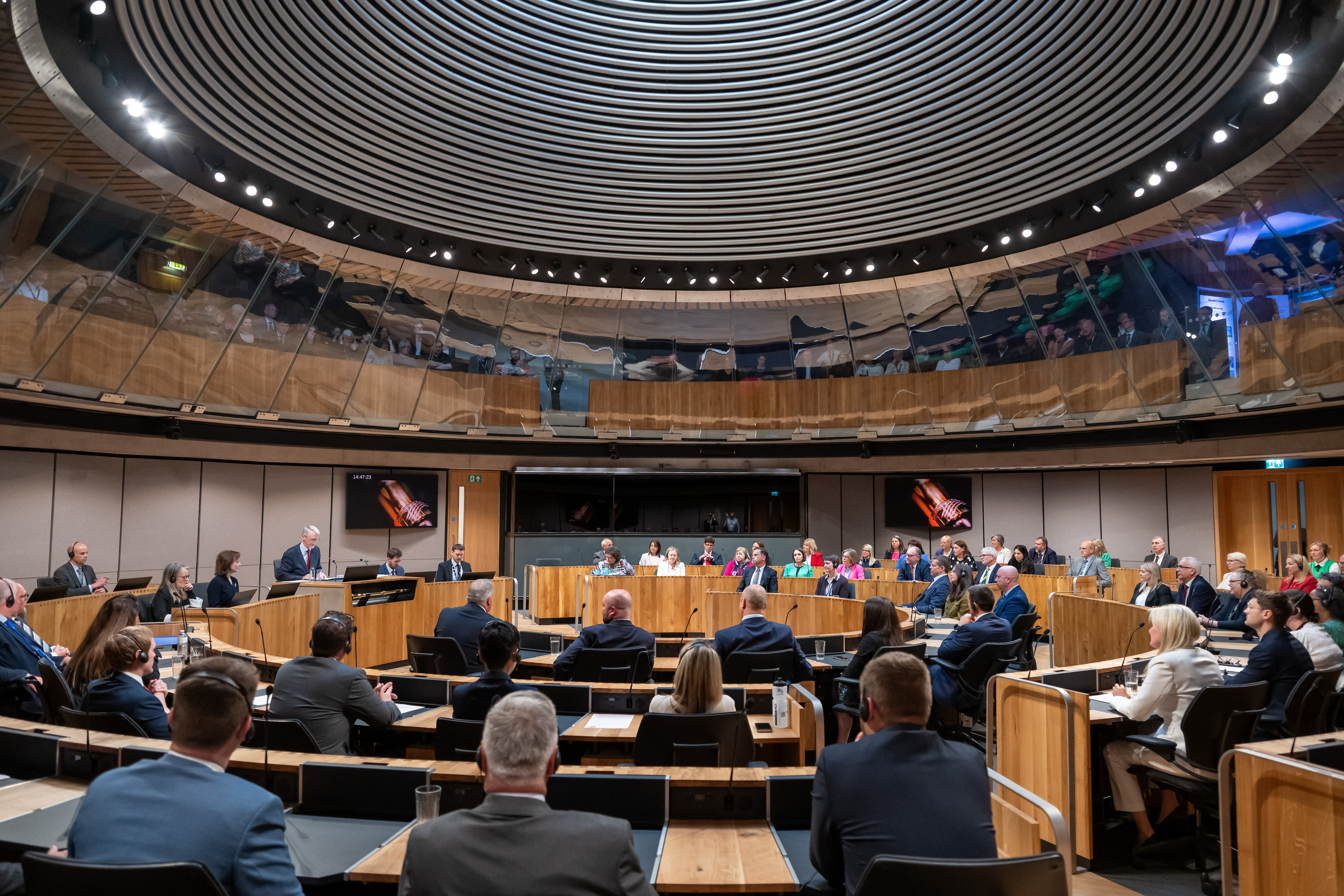
- The first plenary of the 7th Senedd, 12 May 2026

Overview
- Legislative body: Senedd
- Jurisdiction: Wales, United Kingdom
- Meeting place: Senedd building, Cardiff
- Term: May 2026 –
- Election: 2026 Senedd election
- Government: ap Iorwerth government
- Opposition: Thomas shadow cabinet (May 2026 – September 2026); Jenner shadow cabinet (since September 2026)
- Members: 96

This is a list of members of the Senedd elected to the seventh Senedd at the 2026 election. There are a total of 96 members elected from sixteen constituencies, each electing six members through party-list proportional representation (closed list). In between elections, members of the legislature may not necessarily be of the same party or the same candidate elected in 2026.

67 of the members were newly-elected in 2026.

The ceremonial opening of the 7th Senedd occurred on 15 October 2026.

== Composition of the Senedd ==
Party	2026 election	Current
Plaid Cymru	43	44
Reform UK	34	33
Labour	9 (Note: Includes 5 MSs sponsored by the Co-operative Party, who are designated Labour and Co-operative.)	9
Conservative	7	7
Green Party	2	2
Liberal Democrats	1	1
Total	96	96

== Senedd members by party following 2026 election ==
Siambr diagram following the May 2026 election (left) and in September 2026 (right)

== Senedd members by constituency following 2026 election ==
Constituency	Member	Portrait	Party	Years in office
Afan Ogwr Rhondda	Sera Evans		Plaid Cymru	2026–present
Afan Ogwr Rhondda	Alun Cox		Plaid Cymru	2026–present
Afan Ogwr Rhondda	Elyn Stephens		Plaid Cymru	2026–present
Afan Ogwr Rhondda	Benjamin McKenna		Reform UK	2026–present
Afan Ogwr Rhondda	Steve Bayliss		Reform UK	2026–present
Afan Ogwr Rhondda	Huw Irranca-Davies		Labour Co-op	2016–present
Bangor Conwy Môn	Rhun ap Iorwerth		Plaid Cymru	2013–present
Bangor Conwy Môn	Mair Rowlands		Plaid Cymru	2026–present
Bangor Conwy Môn	Elfed Williams		Plaid Cymru	2026–present
Bangor Conwy Môn	Helen Jenner		Reform UK	2026–present
Bangor Conwy Môn	John Clark		Reform UK	2026–present
Bangor Conwy Môn	Janet Finch-Saunders		Conservatives	2011–present
Blaenau Gwent Caerffili Rhymni	Delyth Jewell		Plaid Cymru	2019–present
Blaenau Gwent Caerffili Rhymni	Lindsay Whittle		Plaid Cymru	2011–2016; 2025–present
Blaenau Gwent Caerffili Rhymni	Niamh Salkeld		Plaid Cymru	2026–present
Blaenau Gwent Caerffili Rhymni	Llŷr Powell		Reform	2026–present
Blaenau Gwent Caerffili Rhymni	Catherine Cullen		Reform UK	2026–present
Blaenau Gwent Caerffili Rhymni	Joshua Kim		Reform UK	2026–present
Brycheiniog Tawe Nedd	James Evans		Reform UK	2021–present
Brycheiniog Tawe Nedd	Iain McIntosh		Reform UK	2026–present
Brycheiniog Tawe Nedd	David Mills		Reform UK	2026–present
Brycheiniog Tawe Nedd	Sioned Williams		Plaid Cymru	2021–present
Brycheiniog Tawe Nedd	Rebeca Phillips		Plaid Cymru	2026–present
Brycheiniog Tawe Nedd	Jane Dodds		Liberal Democrats	2021–present
Caerdydd Ffynnon Taf	Dafydd Trystan Davies		Plaid Cymru	2026–present
Caerdydd Ffynnon Taf	Zaynub Akbar		Plaid Cymru	2026–present
Caerdydd Ffynnon Taf	Nick Carter		Plaid Cymru	2026–present
Caerdydd Ffynnon Taf	Cai Parry-Jones		Reform UK	2026–present
Caerdydd Ffynnon Taf	Shav Taj		Labour	2026–present
Caerdydd Ffynnon Taf	Paul Rock		Green Party	2026–present
Caerdydd Penarth	Anna Brychan		Plaid Cymru	2026–present
Caerdydd Penarth	Kiera Marshall		Plaid Cymru	2026–present
Caerdydd Penarth	Leticia Gonzalez		Plaid Cymru	2026–present
Caerdydd Penarth	Joe Martin		Reform UK	2026–present
Caerdydd Penarth	Anthony Slaughter		Green Party	2026–present
Caerdydd Penarth	Huw Thomas		Labour	2026–present
Casnewydd Islwyn	Dan Thomas		Reform UK	2026–present
Casnewydd Islwyn	Peredur Owen Griffiths		Plaid Cymru	2021–present
Casnewydd Islwyn	Art Wright		Reform UK	2026–present
Casnewydd Islwyn	Lyn Ackerman		Plaid Cymru	2026–present
Casnewydd Islwyn	Jayne Bryant		Labour	2016–present
Casnewydd Islwyn	Natasha Asghar		Conservatives	2021–present
Ceredigion Penfro	Elin Jones		Plaid Cymru	1999–present
Ceredigion Penfro	Kerry Ferguson		Plaid Cymru	2026–present
Ceredigion Penfro	Anna Nicholl		Plaid Cymru	2026–present
Ceredigion Penfro	Claire Archibald		Reform UK	2026–present
Ceredigion Penfro	Paul Marr		Reform UK	2026–present
Ceredigion Penfro	Paul Davies		Conservatives	2007–present
Clwyd	Adrian Mason		Reform	2026–present
Clwyd	Louise Emery		Reform	2026–present
Clwyd	Thomas Montgomery		Reform	2026–present
Clwyd	Llyr Gruffydd		Plaid Cymru	2011–present
Clwyd	Becca Martin		Plaid Cymru	2026–present
Clwyd	Darren Millar		Conservatives	2007–present
Fflint Wrecsam	Cristiana Emsley		Reform	2026–present
Fflint Wrecsam	Nigel Williams		Reform	2026–present
Fflint Wrecsam	Carrie Harper		Plaid Cymru	2026–present
Fflint Wrecsam	Marc Jones		Plaid Cymru	2026–present
Fflint Wrecsam	Ken Skates		Labour	2011–present
Fflint Wrecsam	Sam Rowlands		Conservatives	2021–present
Gwynedd Maldwyn	Siân Gwenllian		Plaid Cymru	2016–present
Gwynedd Maldwyn	Mabon ap Gwynfor		Plaid Cymru	2021–present
Gwynedd Maldwyn	Beca Brown		Plaid Cymru	2026–present
Gwynedd Maldwyn	Elwyn Vaughan		Plaid Cymru	2026–present
Gwynedd Maldwyn	Andrew Griffin		Reform	2026–present
Gwynedd Maldwyn	Claire Johnson-Wood		Reform	2026–present
Gŵyr Abertawe	Gwyn Williams		Plaid Cymru	2026–present
Gŵyr Abertawe	Safa Elhassan		Plaid Cymru	2026–present
Gŵyr Abertawe	John Davies		Plaid Cymru	2026–present
Gŵyr Abertawe	Francesca O'Brien		Reform UK	2026–present
Gŵyr Abertawe	Steven Rodaway		Reform UK	2026–present
Gŵyr Abertawe	Mike Hedges		Labour Co-op	2011–present
Pen-y-bont Bro Morgannwg	Mark Hooper		Plaid Cymru	2026–present
Pen-y-bont Bro Morgannwg	Sarah Rees		Plaid Cymru	2026–present
Pen-y-bont Bro Morgannwg	Sarah Cooper-Lesadd		Reform UK (May–September 2026)	2026–present
Pen-y-bont Bro Morgannwg	Sarah Cooper-Lesadd		Plaid Cymru (September 2026–present)	2026–present
Pen-y-bont Bro Morgannwg	Gareth Thomas		Reform UK	2026–present
Pen-y-bont Bro Morgannwg	Andrew RT Davies		Conservatives	2007–present
Pen-y-bont Bro Morgannwg	Sarah Murphy		Labour Co-op	2021–present
Pontypridd Cynon Merthyr	Heledd Fychan		Plaid Cymru	2021–present
Pontypridd Cynon Merthyr	Lis McLean		Plaid Cymru	2026–present
Pontypridd Cynon Merthyr	Sara Crowley		Plaid Cymru	2026–present
Pontypridd Cynon Merthyr	Jason O'Connell		Reform	2026–present
Pontypridd Cynon Merthyr	David Hughes		Reform	2026–present
Pontypridd Cynon Merthyr	Vikki Howells		Labour Co-op	2016–present
Sir Fynwy Torfaen	Matthew Jones		Plaid Cymru	2026–present
Sir Fynwy Torfaen	Donna Cushing		Plaid Cymru	2026–present
Sir Fynwy Torfaen	Laura Anne Jones		Reform UK	2003–2007; 2020–present
Sir Fynwy Torfaen	Stephen Senior		Reform UK	2026–present
Sir Fynwy Torfaen	Peter Fox		Conservatives	2021–present
Sir Fynwy Torfaen	Lynne Neagle		Labour Co-op	1999–present
Sir Gaerfyrddin	Cefin Campbell		Plaid Cymru	2021–present
Sir Gaerfyrddin	Nerys Evans		Plaid Cymru	2007–2011; 2026–present
Sir Gaerfyrddin	Adam Price		Plaid Cymru	2016–present
Sir Gaerfyrddin	Gareth Beer		Reform	2026–present
Sir Gaerfyrddin	Carmelo Colasanto		Reform	2026–present
Sir Gaerfyrddin	Sarah Edwards		Reform	2026–present

== See also ==
- 1999 National Assembly for Wales election and Members of the 1st National Assembly for Wales
- 2003 National Assembly for Wales election and Members of the 2nd National Assembly for Wales
- 2007 National Assembly for Wales election and Members of the 3rd National Assembly for Wales
- 2011 National Assembly for Wales election and Members of the 4th National Assembly for Wales
- 2016 National Assembly for Wales election and Members of the 5th National Assembly for Wales
- 2021 Senedd election and Members of the 6th Senedd
- List of by-elections to the Senedd and List of elections to the Senedd
- Senedd constituencies
