= Caerau, Bridgend =

Village in Bridgend County Borough, Wales

Coordinates: 51.635°N 3.656°W

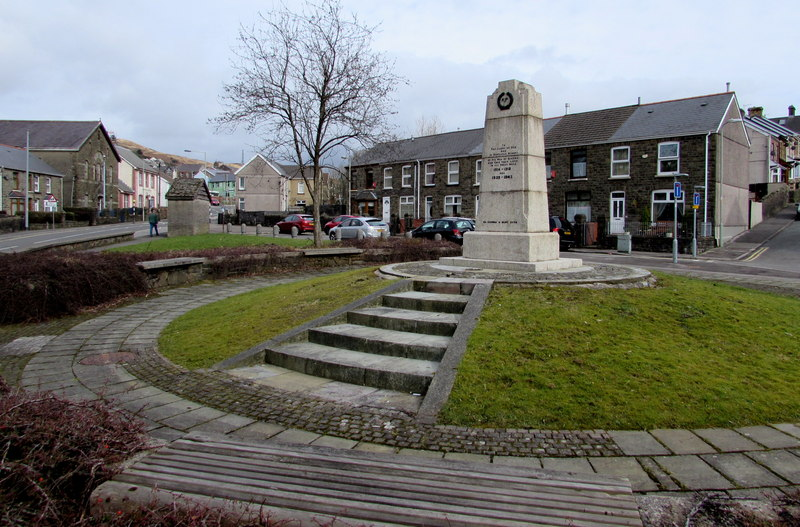

Caerau is a former mining village in the community of Maesteg, Bridgend County Borough, Wales, located approximately 2 miles north of the centre of Maesteg town in the Llynfi Valley. Caerau, surrounded by mountainous terrain and forestry, is one of the border points between Bridgend County Borough and Neath Port Talbot County Borough, bordered to the north by Croeserw and Cymmer, Neath Port Talbot. Caerau borders Dyffryn and Spelter to the south in Nantyffyllon, Maesteg.

== Governance ==
For elections to Bridgend County Borough Council, Caerau is part of the electoral ward of Caerau, which also includes the Nantyffyllon area of Maesteg. The ward elects two county borough councillors.

Representation of Caerau
Level	Body	Constituency or Ward	Representatives
Community	Maesteg Town Council	Caerau Ward, Local	Cllr. Paul Davies; Cllr. Adam Rhys Davies, Deputy Mayor of Maesteg 2020/2021; Cllr. Andrew James, Mayor of Maesteg 2020/2021; Cllr. Stephen Smith
County	Bridgend County Borough Council	Caerau Ward, County	Cllr. Paul Davies (2022– ) Cllr. Chris Davies (2022– )
Wales	Welsh Parliament	Afan Ogwr Rhondda	Steve Bayliss (Reform UK); Alun Cox (Plaid Cymru); Sera Evans (Plaid Cymru); Benjamin Hodge McKenna (Reform UK); Huw Irranca-Davies (Labour); Elyn Stephens (Plaid Cymru)
UK	UK Parliament	Aberafan Maesteg	Stephen Kinnock (Labour)
EU (former)	EU Parliament	Wales constituency	N/A

== History ==
Caerau was originally a village with very little significance and population up until the late 1800s when the extensive mineral extraction industry gained traction. The North's Navigation Collieries company established Caerau Colliery in 1889, and following an insatiable demand for labour, the village population increased dramatically.

Many of the early houses and buildings in Caerau were built by North's Navigation company, and were mostly built with locally quarried stone. This gives the village a characteristic style of architecture with its native Carboniferous limestone masonry in its buildings. This style can often be seen combined with crenellated door and window surrounds made of locally produced red or blue brick.

Caerau had a significant role in the war effort, both through its continuous production of coal and also its acceptance of large amounts of children evacuees during World War II.

== Caerau Colliery ==
The village grew rapidly after the opening of Caerau Colliery in 1889 by North's Navigation Collieries. In brief, the colliery consisted of three shafts (North, South and No. 3 Pits) and employed 2,400 men at its peak in the early 1920s. The mine closed in 1977.

The Inspector of Mines list, 1896, shows there were 533 men employed in Caerau "South Pit" producing steam coal. Further development saw the sinking of No.3 House Coal Pit in 1903. In 1908, there were 1,170 men employed in the two Steam Coal Pits and 57 in the House Coal Pit. This colliery held the record output for the South Wales area in 1913. By 1918, the workforce had risen to 1,839.

From a list drafted in 1923, there were 2,040 employed at the Steam Coal Pits, producing coal and ironstone from the Six Feet, Seven Feet and Upper and Lower New Seams. The House Coal Pit employed 340 men, producing from the Two and a Half Feet Seam. The House Coal Pit closed in 1925.

Three men were killed in an underground accident at Caerau Colliery in 1931. By the end of the war in 1945, there were 568 men still in employment.

Production began to slow from 1977. During its final two years, coal production concentrated on the Bute Seam. Caerau Colliery eventually closed permanently in 1979, five years before Margaret Thatcher's announcement of coal pit closures in 1984 which led to the miners' strike of 1984 and 1985. Most of the men were transferred to nearby Coegnant and St. John's Colliery.

=== Caerau Colliery legacy ===
Even after the mining industry had ceased in 1979, the village still bore the scars of its extensive mining history. Enormous landforms created by the dumping of tailings from the colliery (known locally as “coal tips” or simply “tips”) still remained. These landforms were levelled and landscaped during the 1980s, now very little traces remain of the mining industry in the village.

More recently, plans to produce environmentally friendly geothermically heated water at around 20.6 degrees Celsius for use in heating homes. The concept is utilising the naturally heated water from the flooded former mine workings of Caerau Colliery through a heat exchanger to provide heat to homes. The project is projected to cost £9.4M.

== Population ==
The ward population taken at the 2011 census was 6,995.

== Amenities and community projects ==
Caerau is home to a range of community projects. For example, Caerau Market Garden which is managed by Caerau Community Growers, and Noddfa Community Project at Noddfa Community Centre.

== Religion ==
Due to the predominantly practising Christian population at the turn of the 19th century, there were many churches built. However, due to the sharp decline in the practising Christians in the village many of these buildings are now derelict or demolished. St. Cynfelin church is still open and regularly attended.

Noddfa Chapel is a former church that is now used as a Library and for youth activities. The village also has a public park that includes a bowls green, which is the home of the village's bowls team.

== Recreation and facilities ==
Caerau Road contains most of the village's retail facilities. Formerly home to a diverse number of shops and establishments, the area is now mainly populated by convenience stores and take-away meal outlets.

The village once contained its own cinemas however these facilities no longer remain. The village cenotaph now stands in the place of the Coliseum, a once popular cinema which was demolished in the 1970s.

There are public allotment facilities near North Street called Caerau Market Garden, which is popular among residents for growing vegetables. There is also an organisation called Men's Shed, which provides affordable meals and groceries to residents.

Caerau lacks a miners’ institute building. This is due to an arson attack on the former premises which was situated on what is now a grassy area between Wesley street and Library Road.

== Hotels and public houses ==
Due to its significance as a mining village, many hotels were built to accommodate the number of visitors to the village as a result. None of the premises now accept guests, but many still remain open as public houses.

The Station (1905), Navi (formerly “Navigation” 1882) and Blaenllynfi (1892) are surviving examples of the village's hotels, however the Blaencaerau Hotel (renamed “The Monkey”) was destroyed by arson in 1990 and the Dyffryn Hotel is disused.

== Education ==
English-medium primary education is provided in the village at Caerau Primary School. The school is a modern design that was constructed with environmentally friendly materials. It replaced the old 19th century school building that was destroyed by arson.

Secondary and further education is provided outside of the village in Ysgol Maesteg School.

== Transport ==
The village is located on the A4063 road between Croeserw and Maesteg.

There are bus services operating routes through the village as well as taxi firms operating from the village. Parking is free throughout the village.

Caerau train station and the associated railway routes were made defunct during the Beeching Report cutback of rail services in the 1960s. The nearest railway station to the village is Maesteg.

== Sport ==
Caerau FC, the local football club, play in the 1st division of the South Wales Amateur League (as of 2008–09). They play at the Athletic Ground at Humphreys Terrace, which is a south of the village centre.

Caerau also hosts a national-standard BMX track, home to the Llynfi BMX Racing Club, behind The Duffryn Pub on Coegnant Road. There is also a Clubhouse for the Bowling Green at Caerau Park.

Caerau is also the training ground for Llynfi Valley Panthers Netball Club, who train in Caerau Primary School.
