= John Clark (Welsh politician) =

Welsh politician (born 1968)

John Clark MS
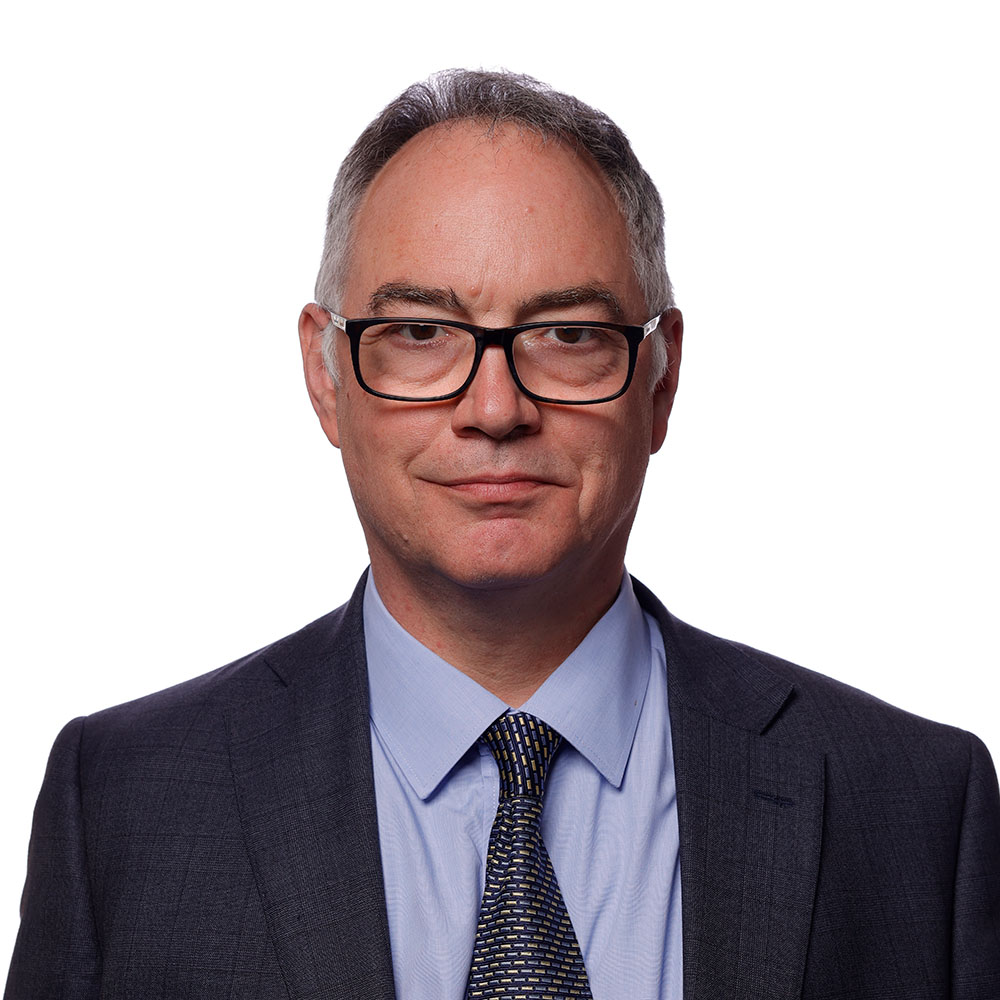
- Official portrait, 2026

Member of the Senedd for Bangor Conwy Môn
- Incumbent
- Assumed office 8 May 2026
- Preceded by: Constituency established

Personal details
- Born: Thomas John Clark; 1 July 1968 (age 58)
- Party: Reform UK

Thomas John Clark (born 1 July 1968) is a Welsh politician for Reform UK Wales, who has served as Member of the Senedd for the Bangor Conwy Môn constituency since May 2026.

== Background ==
Clark described himself as a CEO and was a co-director of a micro company, Artificial Art Ltd.

== Political career ==
Clark previously competed unsuccessfully with Reform in the 2024 United Kingdom general election in the Bangor Aberconwy constituency, coming in 4th place with 6,091 votes. In 2026, Clark was elected as Reform's second MS in the Bangor Conwy Môn constituency.

== Political views ==
In 2023, Clark described the Russo-Ukrainian war as an attempt by NATO to "bleed Russia dry", and saying that the Ukraine war was the "excuse" to do so.

== See also ==
- 7th Senedd
