= Gŵyr Abertawe =

Senedd constituency (from 2026)

- County multi-member constituency for the Senedd
- Boundary of Gŵyr Abertawe in Wales
- Principal areas: Swansea
- Preserved county: West Glamorgan
- Population: 211,891 (2024)
- Major settlements: Loughor, Pontarddulais, Swansea (west)

Current County multi-member constituency
- Created: 2026
- Seats: 6
- Created from: UK Parliament boundaries: Gower; Swansea West; Previous Senedd constituencies: Swansea East; Swansea West; Gower; Previous Senedd region: South Wales West

Gŵyr Abertawe (Welsh for 'Gower [and] Swansea';) is a six-member constituency of the Senedd (Welsh Parliament; Welsh: Senedd Cymru) used in the 2026 Senedd election. It covers most of the principal area of Swansea.

It was proposed following the 2026 review of Senedd constituencies, and is a pairing of the two UK Parliament constituencies of Gower and Swansea West. It has a Welsh-only name.

== Boundaries ==
The constituency covers most the principal area of Swansea, including Swansea city centre, the Gower Peninsula, Loughor and Pontarddulais. It does not include Clydach or the areas east of the River Tawe, such as St Thomas and Port Tennant.

A Senedd constituency comprising the boundaries of the UK Parliament constituencies of Gower and Swansea West, has been proposed by the Democracy and Boundary Commission Cymru for the 2026 election to the Senedd (Welsh Parliament; Senedd Cymru). It was initially proposed using the English name Swansea West and Gower in September 2024, but was shortened to Swansea West Gower and its Welsh name being Gorllewin Abertawe Gŵyr, in December proposals, despite most other constituencies using Welsh-only names. It was later given the Welsh-only name Gŵyr Abertawe and its boundaries were confirmed in the commission's final recommendations in March 2025. When announcing their candidates, Reform UK used "Gower, Swansea West" instead, using the English names for the pair of UK Parliament constituencies that form it.

The constituency was established in 2026, following the passing of the Senedd Cymru (Members and Elections) Act 2024. The act legislates electoral reform of the Senedd to create 16 larger "super constituencies", pairing the 32 UK Parliament constituencies in Wales, and using a new fully proportional voting system, with each constituency electing six Members of the Senedd (MSs) rather than one previously.

== Members of the Senedd ==
Term	Election	Distribution	MS	MS	MS	MS	MS	MS	Ref.
7th	2026	3 / 1 / 2	Gwyn Williams (PC)	Francesca O'Brien (Ref)	Safa Elhassan (PC)	Mike Hedges (Lab)	Steven Rodaway (Ref)	John Davies (PC)	

== Elections ==
=== Elections in the 2020s ===
2026 Senedd election: Gŵyr Abertawe
Party	Candidate	Votes	%	±%
Plaid Cymru	Gwyn Williams (elected) Safa Elhassan (elected) John Davies (elected) Rhiannon Barrar Dafydd Williams Harri Roberts	25,076	31.9%	+15.8%
Reform	Francesca O'Brien (elected) Steven Rodaway (elected) Wayne Parsons Gareth Turner Scott Thorley Nicola Clarke	21,641	27.5%	+26.6%
Labour	Mike Hedges (elected) Rob Stewart Rebecca Fogarty Rebecca Francis‑Davies Kemba Hadaway‑Morgan Patience Bentu	11,195	14.2%	–28.2%
Conservative	Tom Giffard Tara-Jane Sutcliffe Jake Harry Carley Morgan Laura Gilbert Idin Ghotbi	7,523	9.6%	–13.7%
Green	Chris Evans Lilian Martin Nigel Hill Cari Bishop-Jones Will Beasley David Halfacree	6,383	8.1%	+3.6%
Liberal Democrats	Sam Bennett Helen Ceri Clarke Mike O'Carroll Chris Holley Mary Jones Howard Evans	6,262	8.0%	+3.3%
Heritage	Christianne Galt	227	0.3%	+0.3%
TUSC	Ben Golightly Mark Evans	119	0.2%	+0.2%
Independent	Katon Bouzalakos	111	0.1%	+0.1%
Independent	Dan Brown	104	0.1%	+0.1%
Independent	Emma McNamara	81	0.1%	+0.1%
Turnout		78,722	50.7%	+6.8%
Registered electors		155,158		

2021 notional result (Note: Estimate of the 2021 Senedd election result as if the revised boundaries recommended under the 2026 boundary review were in place)
Party	Vote	%	Seats
Labour	33,426	49.7	4
Conservative	16,007	23.8	1
Plaid Cymru	9,527	14.2	1
Liberal Democrats	3,094	4.6	0
Green	2,097	3.1	0
Abolish	1,169	1.7	0
Reform UK	976	1.5	0
UKIP	355	0.5	0
Freedom Alliance	250	0.4	0
Gwlad	224	0.3	0
Propel	189	0.3	0
