= Elfed Williams =

Welsh politician (born 1963)

Elfed Williams MS
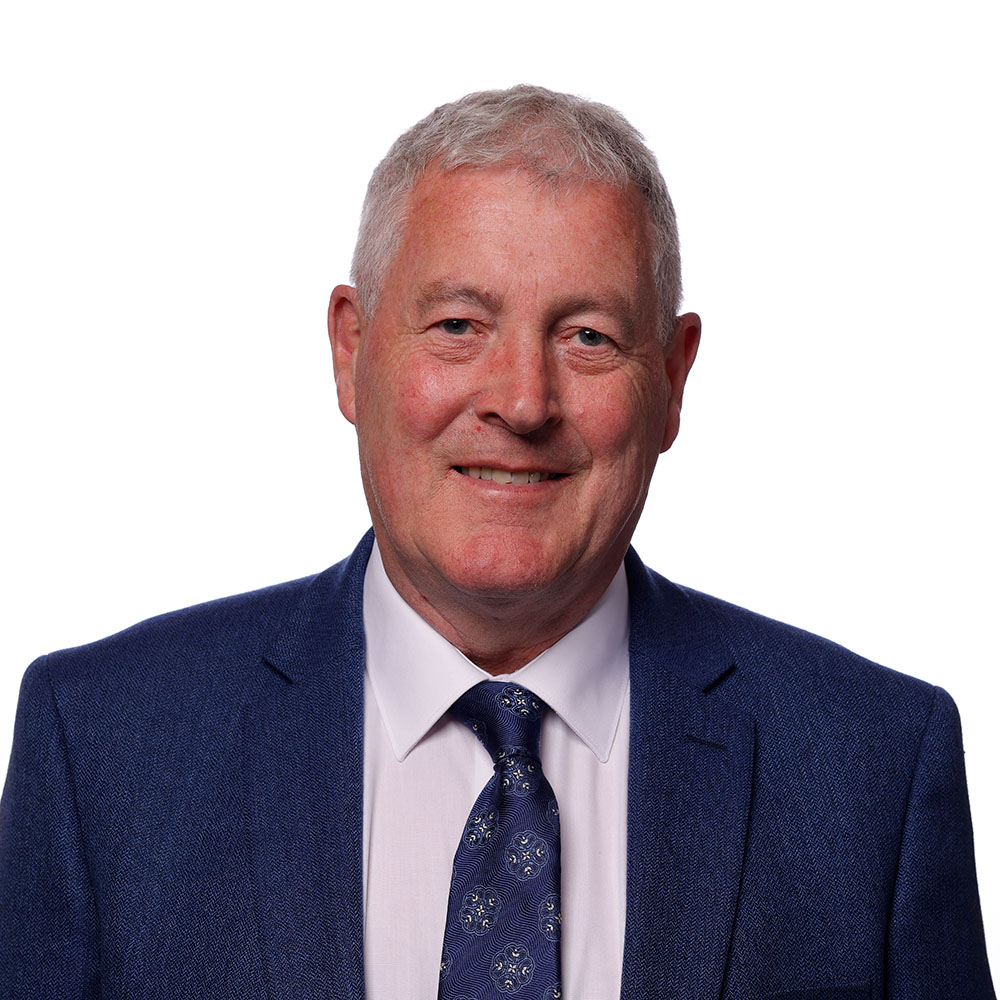
- Official portrait, 2026

Member of the Senedd for Bangor Conwy Môn
- Incumbent
- Assumed office 8 May 2026

Personal details
- Born: Huw Elfed Williams; 15 March 1963 (age 63)
- Party: Plaid Cymru

Elfed Williams is a Welsh politician from Plaid Cymru who has served as Member of the Senedd for Bangor Conwy Môn since May 2026.

== Biography ==
Elfed Williams was the Plaid Cymru candidate for Clwyd West at the 2019 United Kingdom general election. He was also a Plaid candidate in the 2022 Denbighshire County Council election and was successfully elected. He was Director of Services at Conwy and Denbighshire Mental Health Advocacy Service and also chair of YesCymru.
