= John Davies (Plaid Cymru politician) =

Welsh politician

John Davies MS
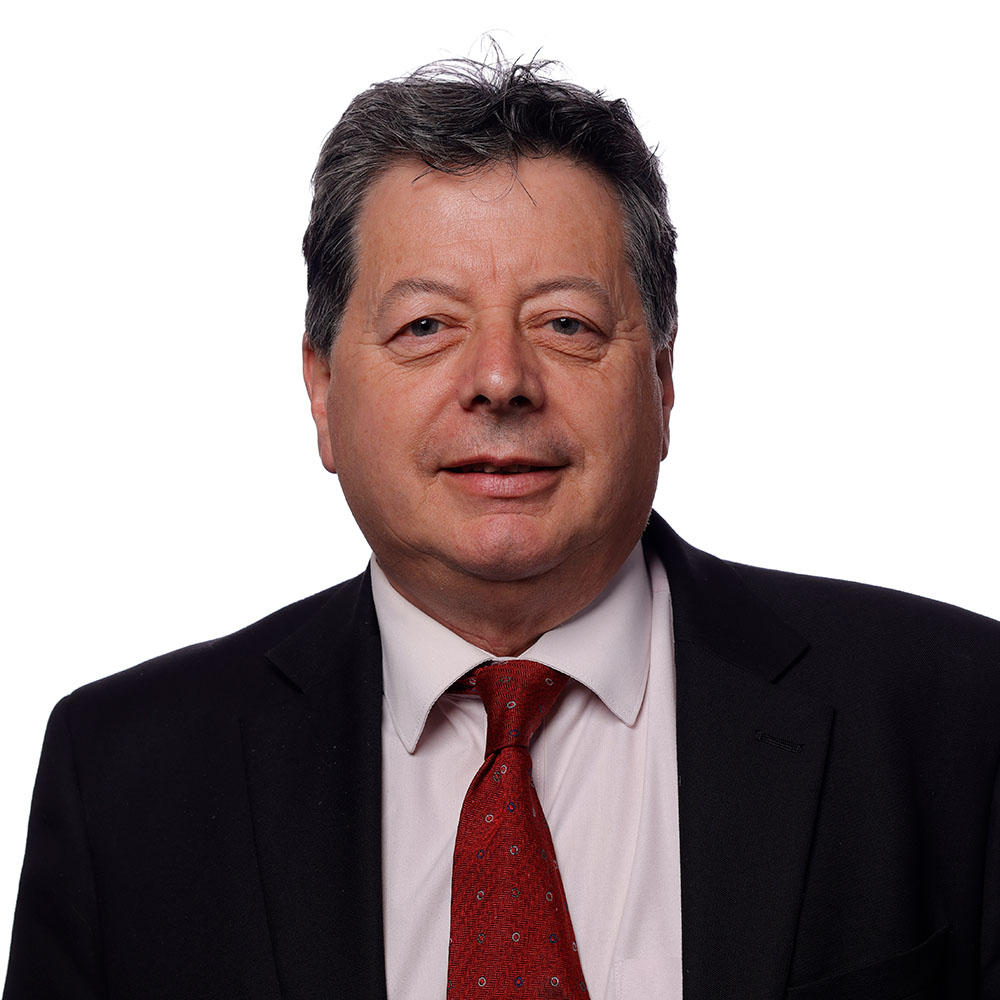
- Official portrait, 2026

Member of the Senedd
- Incumbent
- Assumed office 8 May 2026
- Constituency: Gŵyr Abertawe

Personal details
- Party: Plaid Cymru

John Davies is a Welsh Plaid Cymru politician who has served as a Member of the Senedd (MS) for Gŵyr Abertawe since 2026. He was third on the candidate list in the 2026 Senedd election.

== Political career ==
Davies stood in Gower at the 2019 United Kingdom general election and in Gower at the 2021 Senedd election.

In the 2026 Senedd election, Davies was elected as a MS for the Gŵyr Abertawe constituency.

== See also ==
- 7th Senedd
