= Bangor Conwy Môn =

Senedd constituency (from 2026)

- County multi-member constituency for the Senedd
- Boundary of Bangor Conwy Môn in Wales
- Principal areas: Anglesey; Conwy County Borough; Denbighshire; Gwynedd
- Preserved county: Clwyd; Gwynedd
- Population: 163,460 (2024)
- Major settlements: Bangor, Betws-y-Coed, Conwy, Holyhead, Llandudno

Current County multi-member constituency
- Created: 2026
- Seats: 6
- Created from: UK Parliament boundaries: Bangor Aberconwy; Ynys Môn; Previous Senedd constituencies: Aberconwy; Arfon; Clwyd West; Ynys Môn; Previous Senedd region: North Wales

Bangor Conwy Môn (Welsh for 'Bangor, Conwy [and] Anglesey (Ynys Môn)';) is a six-member constituency of the Senedd (Welsh Parliament; Welsh: Senedd Cymru) used in the 2026 Senedd election. It is located in North Wales and includes Anglesey, northern Gwynedd, most of Conwy County Borough, and part of western Denbighshire.

It was proposed following the 2026 review of Senedd constituencies, and is a pairing of the two UK Parliament constituencies of Bangor Aberconwy and Ynys Môn. It has a Welsh-only name.

== Boundaries ==
The constituency includes the entire county of Anglesey, the area around Bangor and Bethesda in Gwynedd, Conwy County Borough with the exception of the coastline around Colwyn Bay and Abergele, and the western part of central Denbighshire.

A Senedd constituency comprising the boundaries of the UK Parliament constituencies of Bangor Aberconwy and Ynys Môn was proposed by the Democracy and Boundary Commission Cymru for the 2026 election to the Senedd (Welsh Parliament; Senedd Cymru). It was initially proposed using the name Bangor Aberconwy Môn in September 2024, but was shortened to Bangor Conwy Môn in December proposals, with most constituencies using Welsh-only names. The Welsh-only name and boundaries were confirmed in the commission's final recommendations in March 2025. When announcing their candidates, Reform UK used "Bangor Aberconwy, Ynys Môn" instead, using the names for the pair of UK Parliament constituencies that form it.

The constituency was established in 2026, following the passing of the Senedd Cymru (Members and Elections) Act 2024. The act legislates electoral reform of the Senedd to create 16 larger "super constituencies", pairing the 32 UK Parliament constituencies in Wales, and using a new fully proportional voting system, with each constituency electing six Members of the Senedd (MSs) rather than one previously.

== Members of the Senedd ==
Term	Election	Distribution	MS	MS	MS	MS	MS	MS
7th	2026	3 / 1 / 2	Rhun ap Iorwerth (PC)	Helen Jenner (Ref)	Mair Rowlands (PC)	Elfed Williams (PC)	John Clark (Ref)	Janet Finch-Saunders (Con)

== Elections ==
=== Elections in the 2020s ===
2026 Senedd election: Bangor Conwy Môn
Party	Candidate	Votes	%	±%
Plaid Cymru	Rhun ap Iorwerth (E) Mair Rowlands (E) Elfed Williams (E) Dyfed Jones Nia Clwyd Owen Vivek Thuppil Lisa Elfyn Butler Beca Roberts	31,057	44.9	+8.8
Reform	Helen Jenner (E) John Clark (E) Richard John Jones Andrew Winston-Jones Craig Jones Dafydd Wyn Thomas	19,440	28.1	+27.0
Conservative	Janet Finch-Saunders (E) Harry Saville Martin Peet Sam Cotton David Ashworth Lucinda Samuel	8,555	12.4	−13.5
Labour	Joanna Stallard Emily Owen Margaret Lewis Rebecca Gibbons Huw Vaughan Jones Natasha Jose	4,448	6.4	−19.1
Green	Tomos Barlow Linda Rogers Nick Bounds Francis Cookson Vanessa Hall David Bunker	3,101	4.5	+1.4
Liberal Democrats	Leena Sarah Farhart David McBride Mark Rosenthal Rob Atendstaedt Sarah Jackson Preben Vangberg	1,591	2.3	0.0
Socialist Labour	Kathrine Jones	285	0.4	New
Monster Raving Loony	Sir Grumpus L Shorticus	279	0.4	New
Heritage	Mark Edwards	231	0.3	New
Communist	Jaime Fitter	143	0.2	New
Majority		11,617	16.8	+0.4
Turnout		69,130	53.7	+3.0
Registered electors		128,623		
win (new seat)				

2021 notional result (Note: Estimate of the 2021 Senedd election result as if the revised boundaries recommended under the 2026 boundary review were in place)
Party	Vote	%	Seats
Plaid Cymru	28,409	44.3	3
Conservative	17,924	27.9	2
Labour	14,518	22.6	1
Liberal Democrats	1,709	2.7	0
Reform UK	1,198	1.9	0
No More Lockdowns	223	0.3	0
UKIP	74	0.1	0
Abolish	71	0.1	0
Gwlad	39	0.1	0
Independent	34	0.1	0
