= Steven Rodaway =

Welsh politician

Steven Rodaway MS
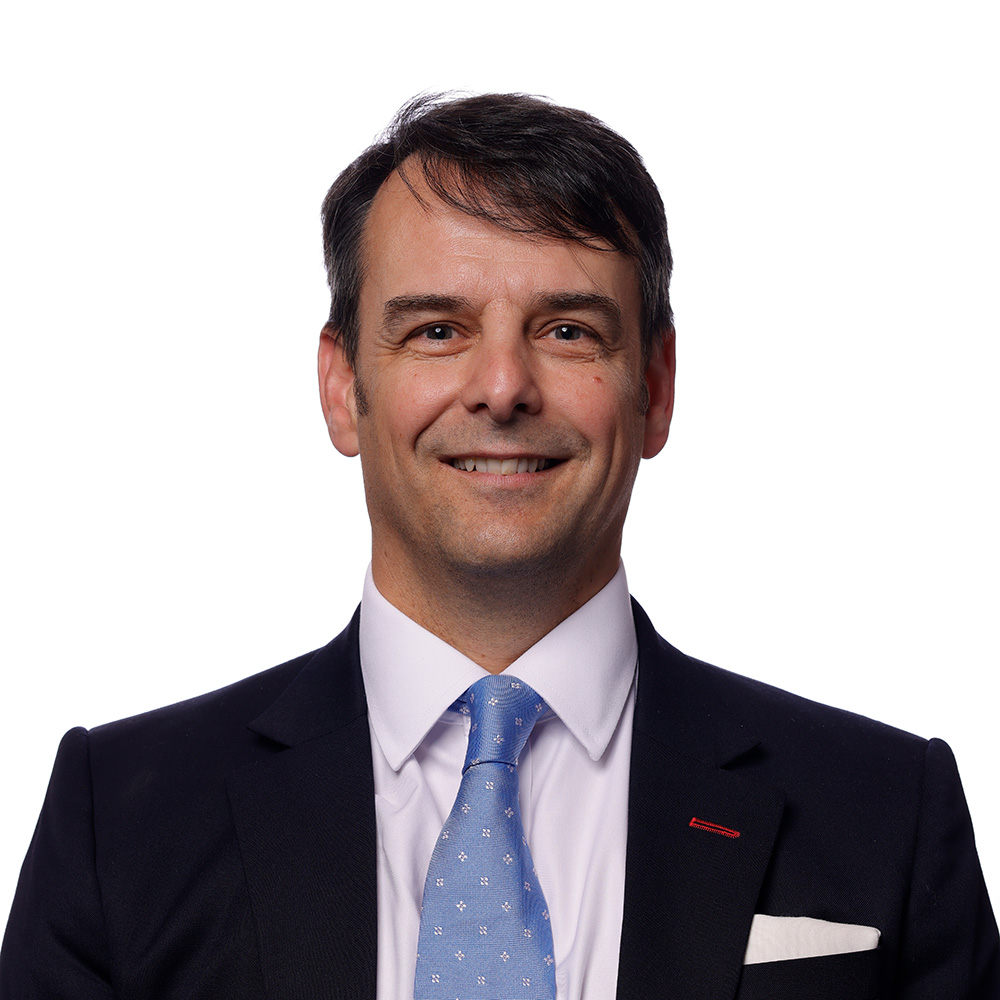
- Official portrait, 2026

Member of the Senedd for Gŵyr Abertawe
- Incumbent
- Assumed office 8 May 2026
- Preceded by: Seat established

Personal details
- Born: April 1976 (age 50)
- Party: Reform UK
- Education: Aberystwyth University

Steven Rodaway is a Welsh politician who has been a Member of the Senedd (MS) for Gŵyr Abertawe since 2026, representing Reform UK.

== Biography ==
Rodaway attended Aberystwyth University, before serving in the British Army. Following his army career he worked in the logistics industry, including for the 2012 Summer Olympics, the 2015 Rugby World Cup and the Singapore Sevens.

In June 2025, he was elected to Pennard Community Council.

In May 2026 he was elected to Senedd.
