= Becca Martin =

Welsh politician

Becca Martin MS
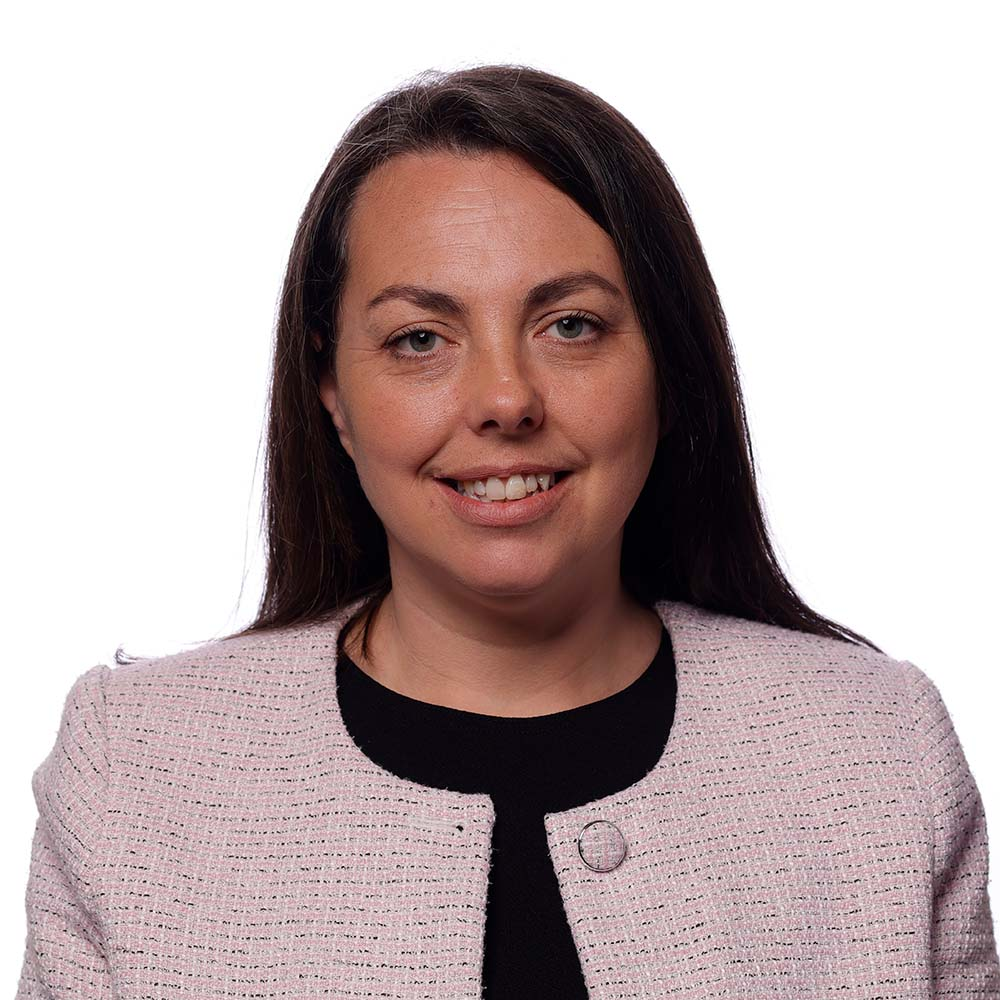
- Official portrait, 2026

Member of the Senedd
- Incumbent
- Assumed office 8 May 2026
- Constituency: Clwyd

Personal details
- Party: Plaid Cymru

Rebecca Ann Martin is a Welsh politician who has been a Member of the Senedd (MS) for Clwyd since 2026, representing Plaid Cymru.

== Political career ==
Martin was the Plaid candidate for the 2021 Maesydre by-election in Wrexham, coming in 1st place with 150 votes, and was re-elected in the 2022 Wrexham County Borough Council election. She was also the Plaid candidate for Wrexham constituency in the 2024 United Kingdom general election, coming in 4th place with 4,138 votes.

In the 2026 Senedd election, Martin was elected as a MS, representing the Clwyd constituency.
