= Afan Ogwr Rhondda =

Senedd constituency (from 2026)

- County multi-member constituency for the Senedd
- Boundary of Afan Ogwr Rhondda in Wales
- Principal areas: Bridgend County Borough; Neath Port Talbot; Rhondda Cynon Taf
- Preserved county: Mid Glamorgan; West Glamorgan
- Population: 194,083 (2024)
- Major settlements: Maesteg, Port Talbot, Treherbert, Treorchy, Tonypandy

Current County multi-member constituency
- Created: 2026
- Seats: 6
- Created from: UK Parliament boundaries: Aberafan Maesteg; Rhondda and Ogmore; Previous Senedd constituencies: Aberavon; Bridgend; Neath; Ogmore; Pontypridd; Rhondda; Previous Senedd region: South Wales Central; South Wales West

Afan Ogwr Rhondda (Welsh for 'Afan, Ogmore, [and] Rhondda';) is a six-member constituency of the Senedd (Welsh Parliament; Welsh: Senedd Cymru) used in the 2026 Senedd election. It covers areas in the south-east of Wales, particularly parts of Bridgend, Neath Port Talbot and Rhondda Cynon Taf.

It was proposed following the 2026 review of Senedd constituencies, and was a pairing of the two UK Parliament constituencies of Aberafan Maesteg and Rhondda and Ogmore. It has a Welsh-only name.

== Boundaries ==
A Senedd constituency comprising the boundaries of the UK Parliament constituencies of Aberafan Maesteg and Rhondda and Ogmore, has been proposed by the Democracy and Boundary Commission Cymru for the 2026 election to the Senedd (Welsh Parliament; Senedd Cymru). It was initially proposed using the name Aberafan Maesteg, Rhondda and Ogmore in September 2024, but was renamed to Afan Ogwr Rhondda in December proposals with most constituencies using Welsh-only names. The Welsh-only name and boundaries were confirmed in the commission's final recommendations in March 2025. When announcing their candidates, Reform UK used "Aberafan Maesteg, Rhondda and Ogmore" instead, using the names for the pair of UK Parliament constituencies that form it.

It encompasses parts of the principal areas (counties/county boroughs) of Bridgend County Borough, Neath Port Talbot and Rhondda Cynon Taf in South Wales. The constituency was established in 2026, following the passing of the Senedd Cymru (Members and Elections) Act 2024. The act legislates electoral reform of the Senedd to create 16 larger "super constituencies", pairing the 32 UK Parliament constituencies in Wales, and using a new fully proportional voting system, with each constituency electing six Members of the Senedd (MSs) rather than one previously.

== Members of the Senedd ==
Term	Election	Distribution	MS	MS	MS	MS	MS	MS
7th	2026	3 / 1 / 2	Sera Evans (PC)	Benjamin McKenna (Ref)	Alun Cox (PC)	Steve Bayliss (Ref)	Huw Irranca-Davies (Lab)	Elyn Stephens (PC)

== Elections ==
=== Elections in the 2020s ===
2026 senedd elections results (Note: Estimate of the 2026 Senedd election result): Afan Ogwr Rhondda
Party	Vote	%	Seats
Plaid Cymru	24,538	36.9	3
Reform UK	22,345	33.6	2
Labour	11,123	16.7	1
Conservative	2,831	4.3	0
Green	2,561	3.9	0
Liberal Democrats	1,800	2.7	0
Heritage	747	1.1	0
Independent	504	0.8	0

2026 Senedd election: Afan Ogwr Rhondda
Party	Candidate	Votes	%	±%
Plaid Cymru	Sera Evans (E) Alun Cox (E) Elyn Stephens (E) Danny Grehan Luned Mair-Barratt Wendy Allsopp	24,538	36.9	+13.0
Reform	Ben McKenna (E) Steve Bayliss (E) Darren James Louise Musgrave Catrin Thomas Zak Weaver	22,345	33.6	+32.5
Labour	Huw Irranca-Davies (E) Buffy Williams David Rees Stephanie Grimshaw Lisa Pritchard Elaine Winstanley Dilwar Ali Tamasree Mukhopadhyay	11,123	16.7	−31.8
Conservative	Abigail Mainon Peter Crocker-Jaques Tony Kear William Robert Martin Rachael Astle Barbara Elizabeth Jones	2,831	4.3	−7.7
Green	Nigel Pugh Anna Tuhey Stephanie Woodhouse David Wade Abbey Rees Ellis Thomas	2,561	3.9	+0.9
Liberal Democrats	Dean Ronan Cen Phillips Gerald Francis Helen Thomas Jim Hehir James McGettrick	1,800	2.7	+0.7
Heritage	Kimberley Isherwood Logan Jenkins	747	1.1	+1.1
Independent	Captain Beany	504	0.8	+0.8
Majority		2,193	3.3	New
Turnout		66,483	44.7	+0.9
Registered electors		148,732		
Plaid Cymru gain from Labour		Swing		

2021 notional result (Note: Estimate of the 2021 Senedd election result as if the revised boundaries recommended under the 2026 boundary review were in place)
Party	Vote	%	Seats
Labour	32,236	50.2	4
Plaid Cymru	15,291	23.8	1
Conservative	8,645	13.5	1
Independent	2,141	3.4	0
Liberal Democrats	1,459	2.3	0
Abolish	1,438	2.2	0
Reform UK	1,009	1.6	0
Propel	848	1.3	0
Gwlad	363	0.6	0
UKIP	341	0.5	0
Freedom Alliance	291	0.5	0
Green	117	0.2	0
