= Steve Bayliss (politician) =

Welsh politician

Steve Bayliss MS
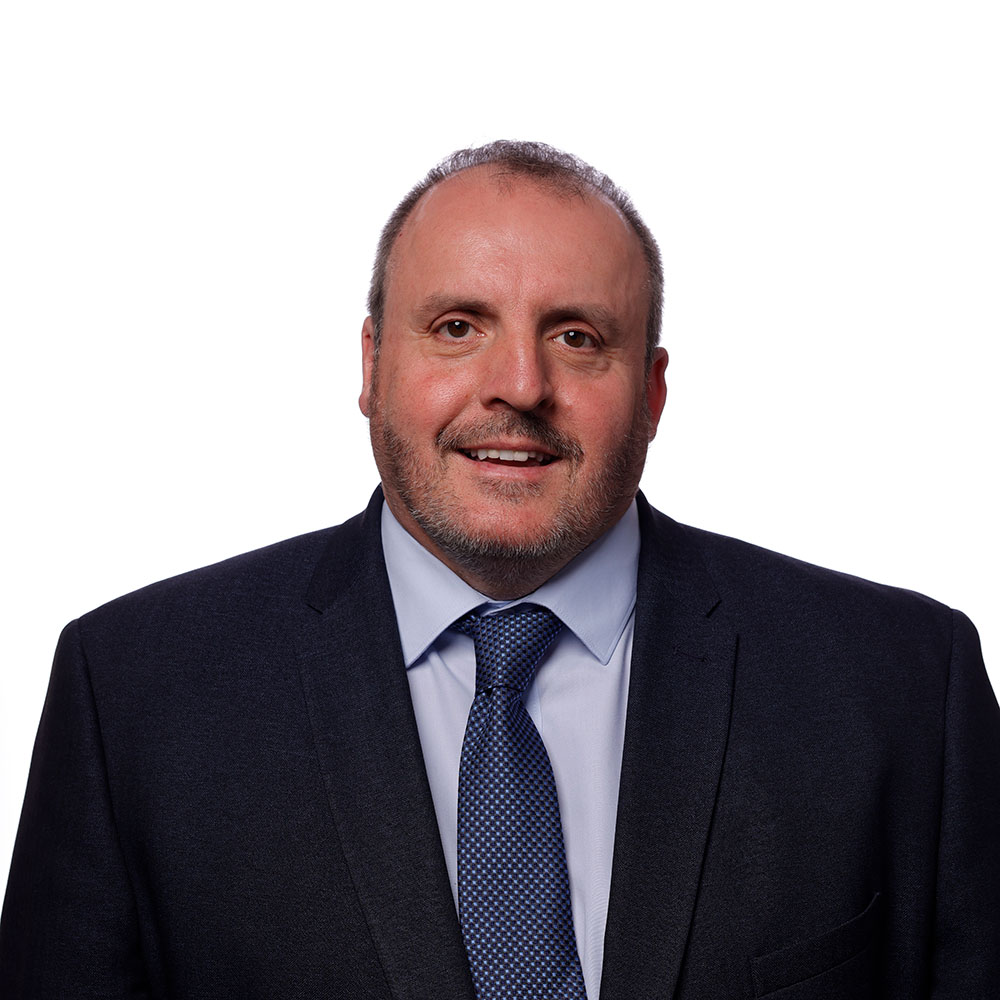
- Official portrait, 2026

Member of the Senedd for Afan Ogwr Rhondda
- Incumbent
- Assumed office 8 May 2026
- Preceded by: Constituency established

Personal details
- Born: Pontypridd, Wales
- Party: Reform UK (2019–present)

Steve Bayliss is a Welsh politician who has served as a Reform UK Wales Member of the Senedd (MS) for Afan Ogwr Rhondda since 2026.

== Biography ==
Bayliss was previously a campaigner for Fathers 4 Justice and worked as a stores assistant for South Wales Fire and Rescue Service.

== Political career ==
Prior to his election to the Senedd, Bayliss stood unsuccessfully for the party in several elections. In 2019, when Reform was known as the Brexit Party, Bayliss stood in Pontypridd, coming 4th with 2,917 votes. In the 2021 Senedd election he came 6th in the Rhondda constituency with 355 votes, and was third on the party's list in the South Wales Central electoral region, failing to win a seat. He stood again in Pontypridd for the 2024 general election, finishing 2nd with 7,823 votes.

For the 2026 Senedd election, Bayliss, who chaired Reform's Aberafan Maesteg, Rhondda and Ogmore branch, was originally placed third on the party's list in Pontypridd Cynon Merthyr before being moved to second place in Afan Ogwr Rhondda. During the campaign, the branch's Facebook page was criticised for circulating AI-generated images without labelling them as synthetic, and for copying campaign material from the Conservative Party. The branch also submitted 18 Freedom of Information requests over five months to Merthyr Tydfil County Borough Council, a local authority outside its area. Bayliss did not respond to requests for comment. He was elected to the Senedd on 8 May 2026.
