= Benjamin Hodge Mckenna =

Welsh politician

Benjamin Hodge Mckenna MS
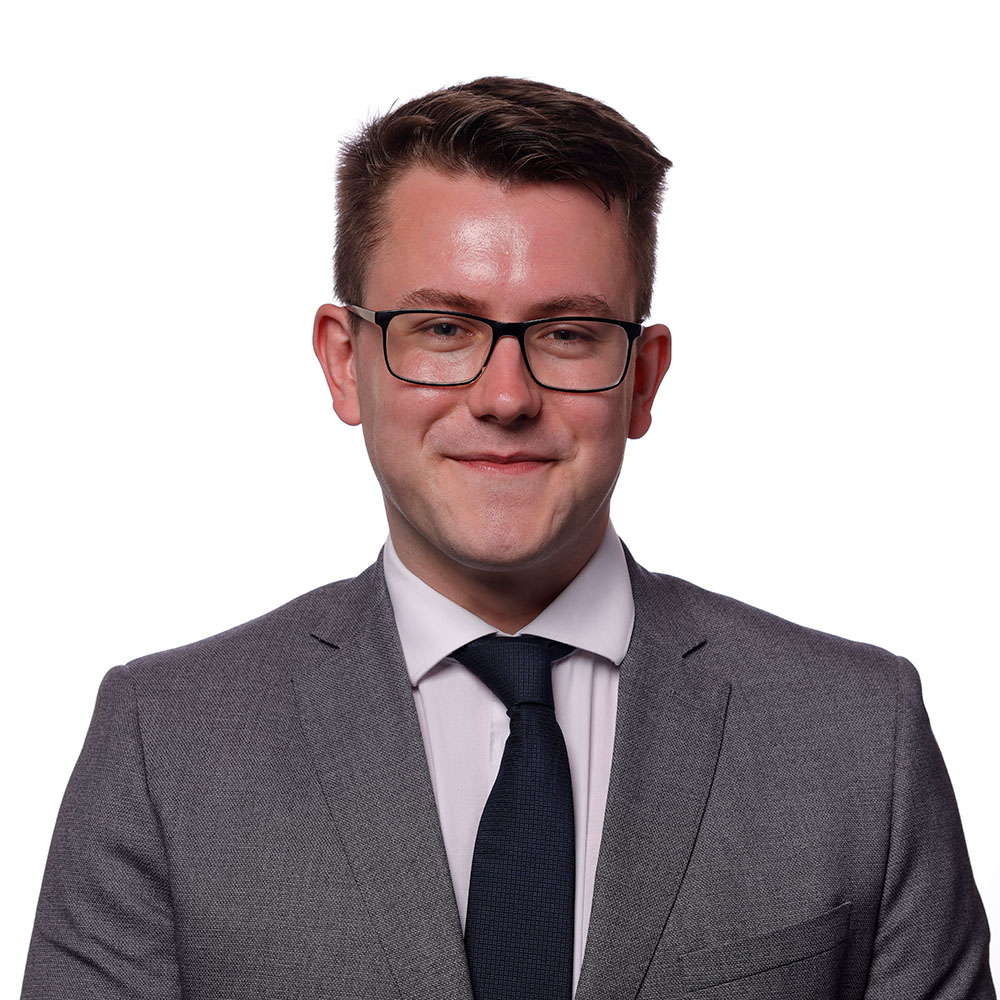
- Official portrait, 2026

Shadow Cabinet Minister for Health and Prevention
- Incumbent
- Assumed office 23 September 2026
- Leader: Helen Jenner
- Preceded by: James Evans

Member of the Senedd for Afan Ogwr Rhondda
- Incumbent
- Assumed office 8 May 2026
- Preceded by: Constituency established

Personal details
- Born: Benjamin George Hodge Mckenna; December 1999 (age 26) Margam, Port Talbot, Wales
- Party: Reform UK
- Education: University of Staffordshire (BA)

Benjamin George Hodge Mckenna (born 1999) is a Reform UK Wales politician who has represented Afan Ogwr Rhondda since May 2026.

== Early life and business career ==
Hodge Mckenna was born in 1999. In November 2022 he incorporated BHM Estates and Lettings Ltd, a property lettings company registered in Port Talbot, of which he was the sole director. The company was dissolved in April 2025.

== Political career ==
Hodge Mckenna was elected as Member of the Senedd for Afan Ogwr Rhondda at the 2026 Senedd election on 8 May 2026.

During the campaign, Hodge Mckenna advocated for re-opening Welsh coal mines using modern technologies, arguing that Welsh emissions are "absolutely minuscule" on a global scale and that Wales should not be "automatically closed off to any options" regarding its natural resources. The proposals were criticised by other parties, including the Liberal Democrats, who described them as "fantasy politics". Hodge Mckenna also campaigned on immigration, stating that illegal migration was "definitely a concern of a lot of voters I'm speaking to" and was having an impact on local communities.
