= Safa Elhassan =

Welsh politician

Safa Elhassan MS
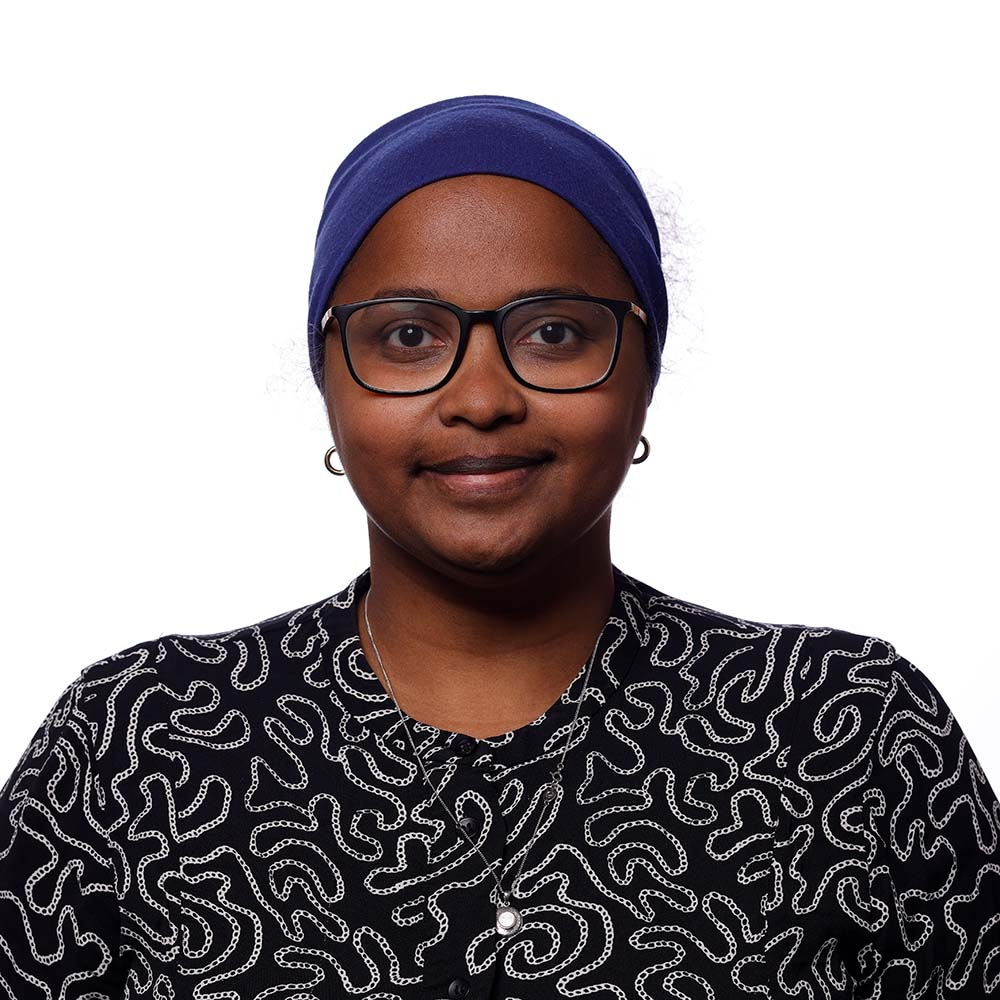
- Official portrait, 2026

Member of the Senedd
- Incumbent
- Assumed office 8 May 2026
- Constituency: Gŵyr Abertawe

Personal details
- Born: October 1984 (age 41) Sudan
- Party: Plaid Cymru
- Spouse: Gwyn Williams

Safa Ahmed Elhassan (born October 1984) is a Welsh Plaid Cymru politician, who has served as a Member of the Senedd (MS) for Gŵyr Abertawe since 2026.

== Early life ==
Elhassan was born in Sudan and moved to Texas as a one-year-old. She later moved to London, and moved to Wales in 2012.

== Medical career ==
Elhassan is a doctor, most recently working as an NHS consultant ophthalmologist working at Swansea Bay University Health Board. She specialises in laser treatments, cataract surgery, and urgent eye care.

== Political career ==
She joined Plaid Cymru in c. 2022, joining her husband who had already been a member of the party.

In the 2026 Senedd election, Elhassan was elected as a MS for the Gŵyr Abertawe constituency.

== Personal life ==
Elhassan is married to Gwyn Williams, who she met whilst both were doing their ophthalmology training. He was elected as an MS alongside her in 2026, making the couple the second ever married couple to simultaneously serve in the Senedd (following Lynne Neagle and Huw Lewis). As of 2026, they have a three-year-old daughter. Elhassan's parents live with the couple in their home in Swansea, having moved from Sudan following the outbreak of the Sudanese civil war in 2023.
