= Anna Nicholl =

Welsh politician

Anna Nicholl MS
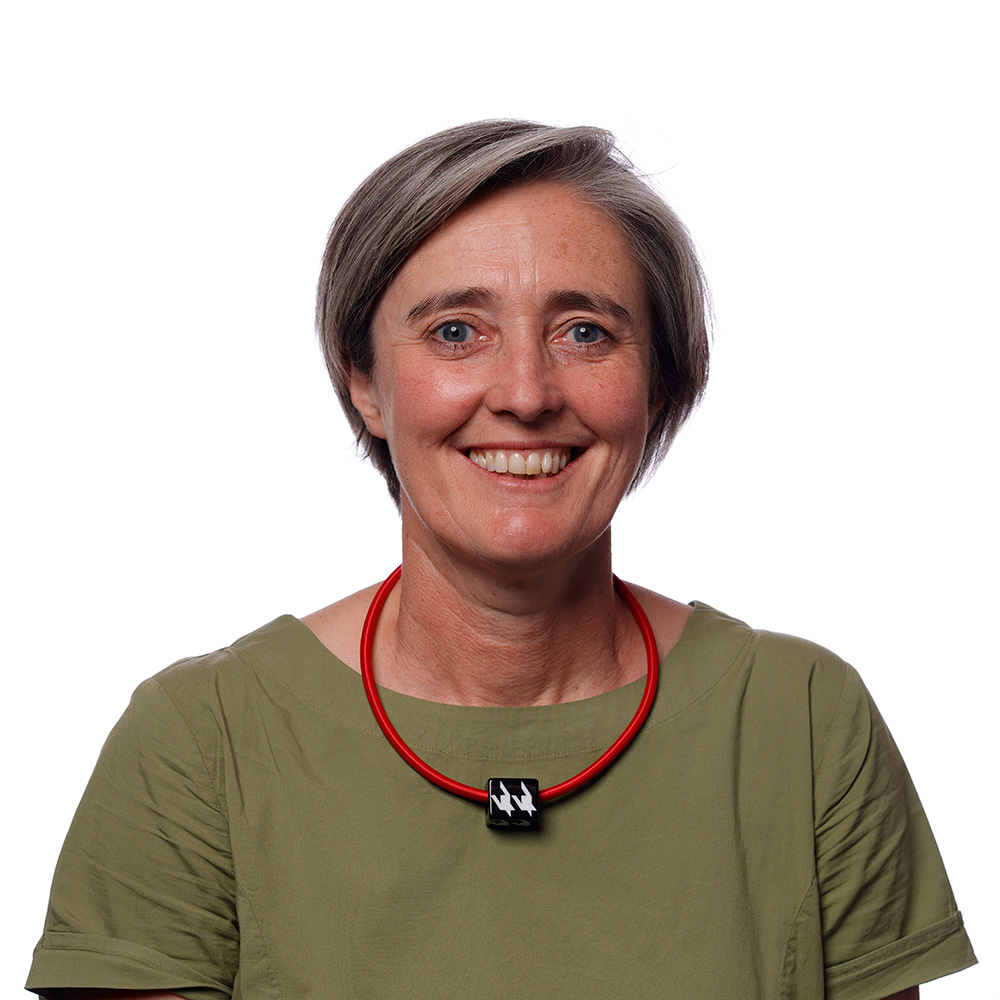
- Official portrait, 2026

Member of the Senedd for Ceredigion Penfro
- Incumbent
- Assumed office 8 May 2026
- Preceded by: Constituency established

Personal details
- Born: 9 July 1975 (age 51)
- Party: Plaid Cymru

Anna Nicholl (born 9 July 1975) is a Welsh politician who has represented Ceredigion Penfro as a member of the Senedd since 2026. She is a member of Plaid Cymru.

== Biography ==
Nicholl was raised in Cardigan, Ceredigion.

Between August 2008 and May 2011 she was a special adviser to Plaid Cymru ministers in the One Wales coalition with Welsh Labour.

From 2016 Nicholl was director of strategy at the Wales Council for Voluntary Action.

In the 2026 Senedd election, she was the third candidate on Plaid Cymru's list in Ceredigion Penfro, behind Elin Jones and Kerry Ferguson. She was successfully elected.
