= Sera Evans =

Welsh politician

Sera Evans MS
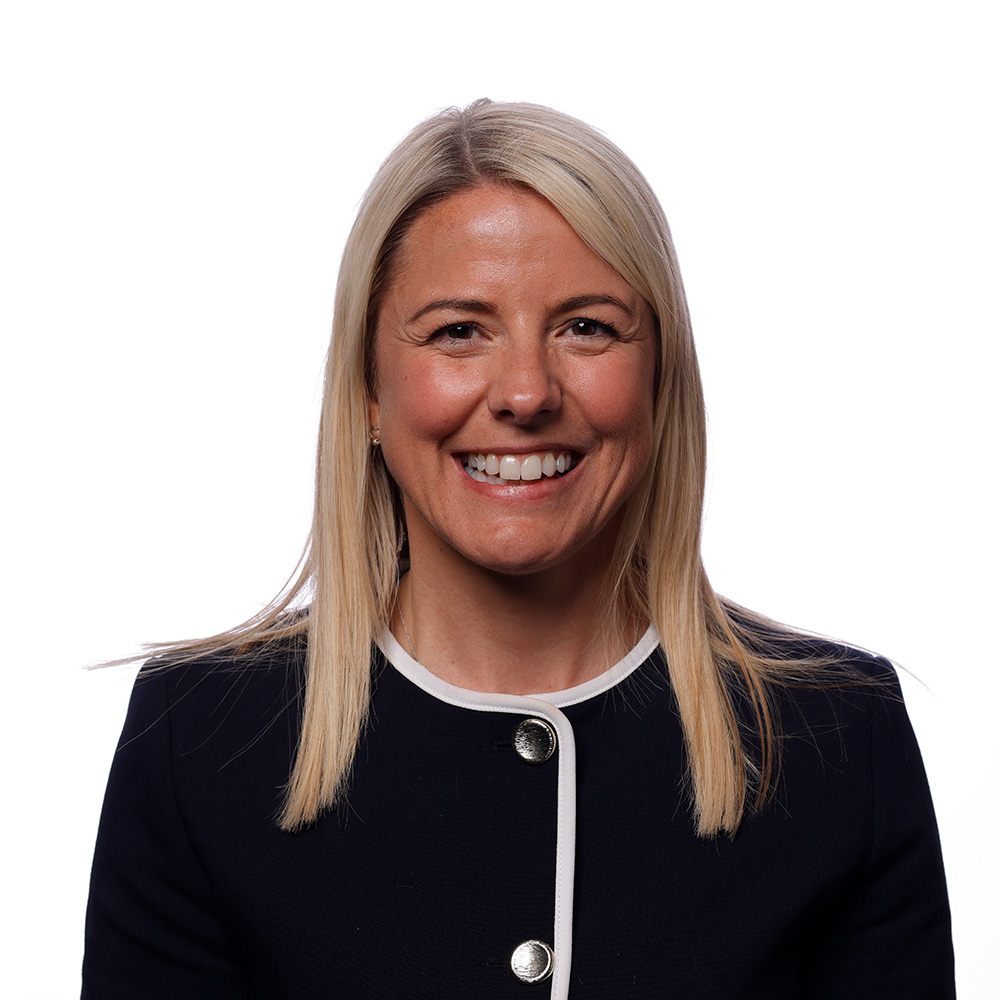
- Official portrait, 2026

Member of the Senedd for Afan Ogwr Rhondda
- Incumbent
- Assumed office 8 May 2026
- Preceded by: Constituency established

Rhondda Cynon Taf County Borough Councillor for Treorchy
- In office 1 May 2008 – 8 May 2026

Personal details
- Born: March 1982 (age 44) Cwmparc
- Party: Plaid Cymru

Sera Evans is a Welsh Plaid Cymru politician who has served as a Member of the Senedd (MS) for Afan Ogwr Rhondda since May 2026, and as a Rhondda Cynon Taf County Borough Councillor for Treorchy since 2008.

== Early life and academic career ==
Evans was born in Cwmparc, Treorchy. She attended Ysgol Gyfun Cymer Rhondda and the University of Oxford. At the time of becoming a member of the Senedd she was working at University of South Wales as Associate Director of UK Student Recruitment and Admissions.

== Political career ==
Evans was elected to represent the Treorchy ward at the 2008 Rhondda Cynon Taf County Borough Council elections at the age of 26. She was re-elected in 2012, 2017, and 2022. She has served as chair of the Education and Inclusion Scrutiny Committee.

She stood for the Rhondda constituency in the 2011 Welsh Assembly elections.

In 2025, Evans was placed first on Plaid Cymru's list for the new Afan Ogwr Rhondda Senedd constituency. She was elected to the Senedd on 8 May 2026.
