= Alun Cox =

Welsh politician

Alun Cox MS
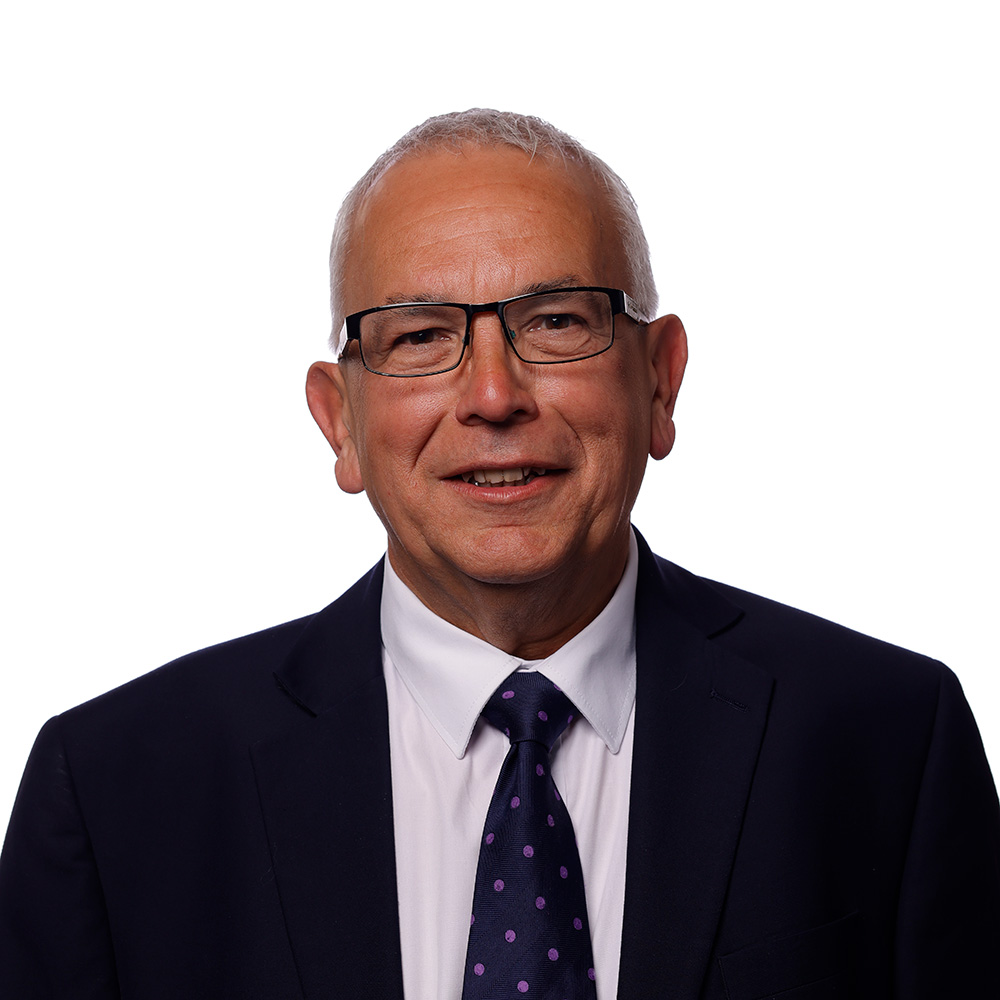
- Official portrait, 2026

Member of the Senedd for Afan Ogwr Rhondda
- Incumbent
- Assumed office 8 May 2026

Rhondda Cynon Taf County Borough Councillor for Porth
- In office 5 May 2017 – 5 May 2022

Personal details
- Born: 1964 (age 61–62) Newport
- Party: Plaid Cymru

Alun Cox is a Welsh Plaid Cymru politician serving as a Member of the Senedd (MS) for Afan Ogwr Rhondda since 2026.

== Early life and academic career ==
Cox was born in Newport and was bought up in a family connected to the steel industry in the area. He attended Uned Gymraeg Cwmbrân and then Ysgol Gyfun Rhydfelen.

He joined Plaid Cymru aged 15 years old after the 1979 referendum on Welsh devolution was rejected. He attended University College, Aberystwyth. After leaving the University, he was elected president of the National Union of Students Wales. He was President from 1989 to 1991.

At the time of becoming a member of the Senedd Cox was working at University of South Wales as Funding and Development officer. He was also Unison's Assistant Branch Secretary at University of South Wales.

== Political career ==
Whilst a student in Aberystwyth Cox was elected to the National Executive of NUS Wales.

He has served as the representative of Plaid Cymru's Trade Union section (UNDEB) on the Party's ruling body, the National Executive Committee.

Cox was the candidate for Merthyr Tydfil and Rhymney at the 1992 United Kingdom general election and 1997 United Kingdom general election. He also stood to represent the Merthyr Tydfil and Rhymney constituency in the 1999 National Assembly for Wales election.

Cox has worked as campaign manager for Leanne Wood's leadership campaign in 2012 and also for her in the 2016 Welsh Assembly election when she won in Rhondda.

=== Local Government ===
He stood unsuccessfully to represent the Porth ward on Rhondda Cynon Taf County Borough Council in 2008 and 2012, before being successfully elected in 2017 but lost in 2022.

=== Senedd Cymru (Welsh Parliament) ===
Cox stood as the second candidate on Plaid Cymru's list for Afan Ogwr Rhondda Constituency for the Senedd Election held on 7 May 2026. Following his election he was appointed to serve on the Economy, Energy and Connectivity Committee and the Public Accounts and Public Administration Committee.

== Personal life ==
Cox lives with his wife and daughter in Porth.
