= Elyn Stephens =

Welsh politician

Elyn Stephens MS
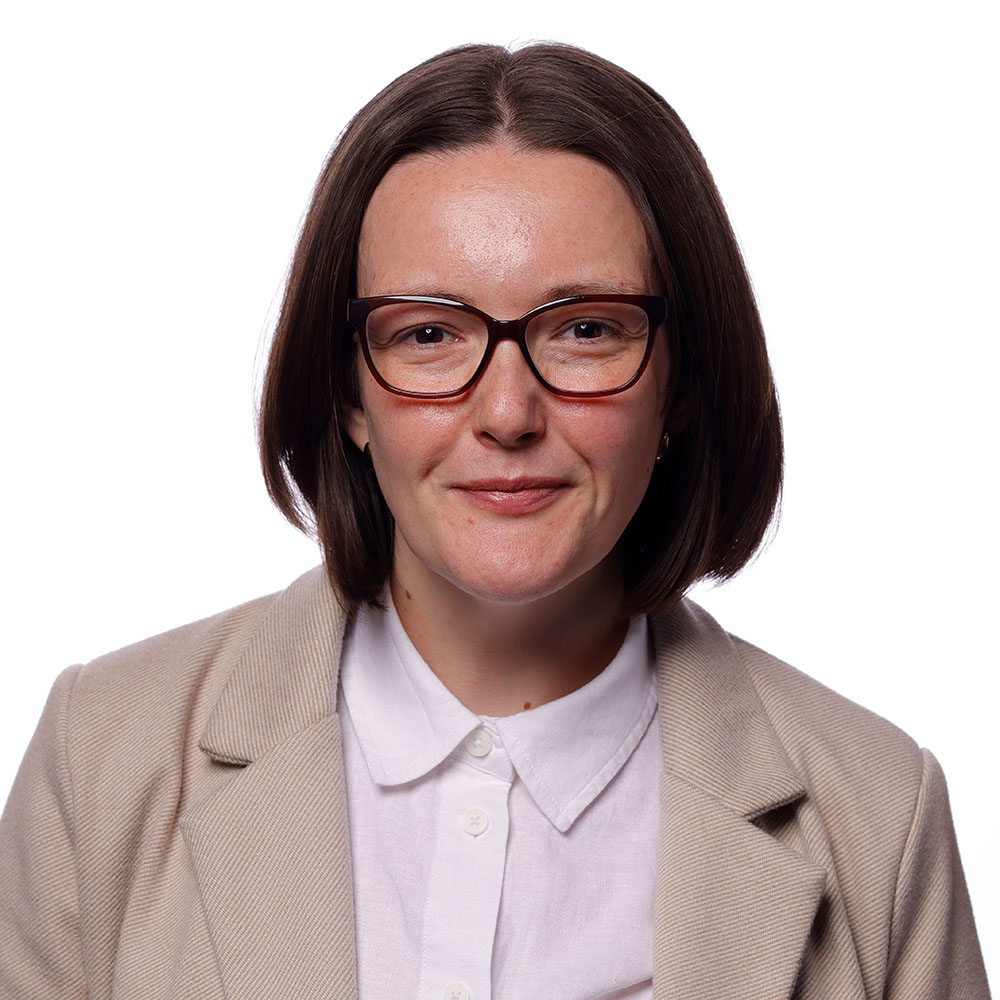

Member of the Senedd for Afan Ogwr Rhondda
- Incumbent
- Assumed office 8 May 2026

Rhondda Cynon Taf County Borough Councillor for Ystrad ward
- In office 5 May 2017 – 5 May 2022

Personal details
- Born: c. 1992
- Party: Plaid Cymru

Elyn Stephens is a Welsh Plaid Cymru politician serving as a Member of the Senedd (MS) for Afan Ogwr Rhondda since 2026.

== Political career ==
Stephens was elected to Rhondda Cynon Taf County Borough Council as the Plaid Cymru councillor for Ystrad ward at the 2017 Rhondda Cynon Taf County Borough Council election on 5 May 2017, aged 25. Whilst serving as a councillor, she led a campaign to provide free sanitary products in all schools in the borough, making Rhondda Cynon Taf one of the first councils in the United Kingdom to do so. Stephens said that "without young people pushing for that policy it still wouldn't exist". She also spoke publicly about experiencing intimidation from older councillors at meetings, describing instances of being "screamed at relentlessly" by a more senior councillor. She did not stand for re-election in the 2022 Rhondda Cynon Taf County Borough Council election.

Prior to her election to the Senedd, Stephens worked as Office Manager for Heledd Fychan MS.

In the 2026 Senedd election, Stephens was elected as an MS for Afan Ogwr Rhondda.

Following her election she was selected to serve on the Local Government, Housing and Planning Committee and the Standards of Conduct Committee.

Stephens is particularly interested in addressing the impacts of poverty on young carers, as well as youth engagement in the democratic process.
