= Member of the Senedd =

Representative in the devolved parliament of Wales

- Aelod o'r Senedd (Welsh)
- Incumbent; 7th Senedd since 2026 election
- Type: Member of parliament
- Abbreviation: MS (plural: MSs); (Welsh: AS, plural: ASau)
- Member of: the Senedd
- Residence: Senedd building
- Seat: List of Senedd Constituencies
- Term length: 4 years
- Constituting instrument: Government of Wales Act 1998
- Inaugural holder: 1st National Assembly
- Formation: 1999
- Unofficial names: Member of the Welsh Parliament; Welsh Parliament Member; Assembly Member (AM; 1999—2020)
- Salary: £67,920

- Plaid Cymru (44)
- Reform (33)
- Labour (9) (Note: Includes 4 MSs sponsored by the Co-operative Party, who are designated Labour and Co-operative.)
- Conservative (7)
- Green (2)
- Liberal Democrats (1)

A member of the Senedd (MS; plural: MSs; Welsh: aelod o'r Senedd; AS, plural: ASau), also known as a member of the Welsh Parliament, (Note: as also used in English-language media and by members, using the legislature's official English name, the "Welsh Parliament".) is a representative elected to the Senedd (Welsh Parliament; Welsh: Senedd Cymru). There are six members for each of the 16 constituencies, with a total of 96 members. Seats are allocated using the D'Hondt method.

A holder of this office was formerly known as an assembly member (AM; plural: AMs; Welsh: aelodau'r cynulliad; AC, plural: ACau), under the legislature's former name, the National Assembly for Wales, from its inception in 1999 until 2020 when it adopted its current names, Welsh Parliament, and Senedd Cymru, simply referred to as Senedd in both English and Welsh. From 1999 to 2026, members were elected using the additional member system, in which 40 MSs represent smaller geographical divisions known as "constituencies" and are elected by first-past-the-post voting, and 20 MSs represent five "electoral regions" using the D'Hondt method of proportional representation.

Typically, the largest party holding the largest number of MSs in the Senedd forms the Welsh Government, and in the event of not securing a majority of MSs, the largest party has first rights to begin coalition talks with other smaller parties. They hold four-year terms; from 2011 to 2026, they held five-year terms.

== Method of election ==
The 96 MSs are elected through closed list proportional representation (using the D'Hondt method) in sixteen six-member constituencies.

== Elections ==
All MSs positions become simultaneously vacant for elections held on a four-year cycle. If a vacancy arises at another time, due to death or resignation, it may be filled by the next available candidate on the relevant party list. If no such candidate is available, the seat lies vacant until the next election.

== Renaming ==
Holders of this office were first called an "Assembly Member" (Welsh: Aelod Cynulliad), abbreviated to "AM" in English (plural: AMs; or in Welsh: AC, plural: ACau), under the legislature's then name, the National Assembly for Wales, from its inception in 1999.

In June 2018, the Assembly Commission held a public consultation into a potential name change, with the commission favouring the title "Welsh Parliament Member", abbreviated to "WPM", in line with the existing name. The public consultation showed the most supported option was "Member of the Welsh Parliament" (MWP) at 30%, followed by "Member of the Senedd" (MS) on 28.4%, and the commission's preferred option on 11.1%. "Member of the Welsh Parliament", abbreviated to MWP, raised concerns from some AMs, over potential ridicle. Their concerns were that the abbreviation "MWP" was too close to Welsh words "twp" ('daft') and "pwp" ('poo'), or sounding similar to a Welsh pronunciation of "muppet". Elin Jones, Presiding Officer of National Assembly for Wales, called for the legislature to be called just the "Senedd", leading to members being called a "Member of the Senedd" as a way to address the concerns. Although this raised its own concerns that the corresponding Welsh name "Aelod o'r Senedd" would have the same Welsh abbreviation as "Aelodau Seneddol" for Members of Parliament to the Parliament of the United Kingdom.

In 2020, the legislature was renamed following the ratification of the Senedd and Elections (Wales) Act 2020, which renamed the legislature as the "Welsh Parliament" in English, and "Senedd Cymru" in Welsh. Holders of the office would instead be called a "Member of the Senedd", abbreviated to "MS", or in Welsh, Aelod o'r Senedd (AS). While "Member(s) of the Welsh Parliament" has also been used.

== See also ==
- List of members of the Senedd
- List of female members of the Senedd
- List of Plaid Cymru MSs
- Members of the 1st National Assembly for Wales
- Members of the 2nd National Assembly for Wales
- Members of the 3rd National Assembly for Wales
- Members of the 4th National Assembly for Wales
- Members of the 5th National Assembly for Wales (or 5th Senedd)
- Members of the 6th Senedd
- Members of the 7th Senedd
- 2016 National Assembly for Wales election
- 2021 Senedd election
- Senedd constituencies and electoral regions
- Member of Parliament
- Member of the Legislative Assembly (Northern Ireland)
- Member of the Scottish Parliament
