= Welsh Government =

Devolved government of Wales

- Welsh: Llywodraeth Cymru
- Devolved government

Overview
- Established: 12 May 1999
- Country: Wales
- Leader: Rhun ap Iorwerth (First Minister)
- Appointed by: First Minister approved by the Senedd, appointed by the monarch
- Main organ: Cabinet
- Responsible to: Senedd
- Annual budget: £26 billion (2025/26)
- Headquarters: Crown Buildings, Cathays Park, Cardiff, Wales
- Website: gov.wales

then-First Minister, Mark Drakeford, taking a COVID-19 press conference in January 2021

The Welsh Government (Welsh: Llywodraeth Cymru, pronounced [ɬəˈwɔdraːɨθ ˈkəmrɨ]) is the devolved government of Wales. It consists of cabinet secretaries and ministers. The government is led by the first minister, usually the leader of the largest party in the Senedd (Welsh Parliament; Welsh: Senedd Cymru), who selects ministers with the approval of the Senedd. The government is responsible for tabling policy in devolved areas (such as health, education, economic development, transport and local government) for consideration by the Senedd and implementing policy that has been approved by it.

The current Welsh Government was formed as a Plaid Cymru minority administration following the 2026 Senedd election, having previously been led by Welsh Labour for 27 years. It is led by Rhun ap Iorwerth who has been the first minister of Wales since May 2026.

== History ==
=== The Welsh Office ===
Prior to devolution in 1999 many executive functions for Wales were carried out by the Secretary of State for Wales and the Welsh Office. The Welsh Office was a department in the Government of the United Kingdom with responsibilities for Wales. It was established in April 1965 to execute government policy in Wales, and was headed by the Secretary of State for Wales, a post which had been created in October 1964. The post however had no Welsh electoral mandate, and over the ensuing years there were complaints of a "democratic deficit". For eleven years prior to 1997 Wales had been represented in the Cabinet of the United Kingdom by a Secretary of State who did not represent a Welsh constituency at Westminster. These factors led to growing calls for political devolution. The Welsh Office was disbanded on 1 July 1999 when most of its powers were transferred to the National Assembly for Wales.

=== Executive Committee of the National Assembly for Wales 1999 to 2007 ===
The National Assembly was created by the Government of Wales Act 1998, which followed a referendum in 1997. As initially established, the Welsh Government had no independent executive powers in law (unlike, for instance, the Scottish ministers and British government ministers). The National Assembly was established as a body corporate by the Government of Wales Act 1998 and the executive, as a committee of the assembly, only had those powers that the assembly as a whole voted to delegate to ministers.

On 27 November 2001, First Minister Rhodri Morgan announced that the brand "Welsh Assembly Government" would be used going forward for the committee, to more clearly delineate the division of functions within the Assembly.

The Government of Wales Act 2006 formally separated the National Assembly for Wales and the Welsh Government, giving Welsh ministers independent executive authority, this taking effect following the May 2007 elections. Following separation, the Welsh ministers exercise functions in their own right. Further transfers of executive functions from the British government can be made directly to the Welsh ministers (with their consent) by an Order in Council approved by the British parliament.

Separation was designed to clarify the respective roles of the assembly and the government. Under the structures established by the Government of Wales Act 2006, the role of Welsh ministers is to make decisions; develop and implement policy; exercise executive functions and make statutory instruments. The remainder of the 60 assembly members in the National Assembly scrutinise the government's decisions and policies; hold ministers to account; approve budgets for the Welsh Government's programmes; and enact acts of assembly on subjects that have been devolved to the Welsh administration.

The result mirrored much more closely the relationship between the British government and British parliament and that between the Scottish Government and the Scottish Parliament.

=== After the 2007 election of the National Assembly for Wales ===
==== Legal separation ====
The new arrangements provided for in the Government of Wales Act 2006 created a formal legal separation between the National Assembly for Wales, comprising 60 assembly members, and the Welsh Assembly Government, comprising the first minister, Welsh ministers, deputy ministers and the counsel general. This separation between the two bodies took effect on the appointment of the first minister by Queen Elizabeth II following the assembly election on 3 May 2007.

Separation was meant to clarify the respective roles of the assembly and the government. The role of the government is to make decisions; develop and implement policy; exercise executive functions and make statutory instruments. The members in the (then) National Assembly would be responsible for scrutinising the Welsh Government's decisions and policies; hold ministers to account; approve budgets for the Welsh Government's programmes; and have the power to enact assembly measures on certain matters. Assembly measures enabled the Assembly to make primary legislation, rather than subordinate legislation only as was the case prior to 2007.

==== Transfer of functions ====
The Assembly's functions, including that of making subordinate legislation, in the main, transferred to the Welsh ministers upon separation. A third body was also established under the 2006 Act from May 2007, called the National Assembly for Wales Commission (now Senedd Commission). It employs the staff supporting the National Assembly, and holds property, enters into contracts and provides support services on its behalf.

==== Welsh ministers ====
The 2006 Act made new provision for the appointment of Welsh ministers. The first minister is nominated by the Senedd and then appointed by His Majesty the King. The first minister then appoints the Welsh ministers and the deputy Welsh ministers with the approval of the monarch. The Act created a new post of Counsel General for Wales, the principal source of legal advice to the Welsh Government. The counsel general is appointed by the monarch, on the nomination of the first minister, whose recommendation must be agreed by the Senedd and who cannot be dismissed without the Senedd's consent, but automatically leaves office when a new first minister is nominated. The counsel general may be, but does not have to be, a member of the Senedd. At the time of passing the Act, it permitted a maximum of 12 Welsh ministers, which includes deputy Welsh ministers, and excludes the first minister and the counsel general. The Senedd Cymru (Members and Elections) Act 2024 increased this maximum to 17.

In Acts of the Senedd and of the UK Parliament, the expression "the Welsh Ministers" is used to refer to the Welsh government in similar contexts to those where "the Secretary of State" would be used to refer to the British government; it is defined to include only the first minister and ministers, not the deputy ministers or the counsel general.

=== 2011 referendum on law-making powers ===
==== Functions and areas of competence ====
Following the "yes" vote in the referendum on further law-making powers for the assembly on 3 March 2011, the Welsh Government was entitled to propose bills to the National Assembly for Wales on subjects within 20 fields of policy. Subject to limitations prescribed by the Government of Wales Act 2006, Acts of the National Assembly could make any provision that could be made by Act of Parliament, but only in 20 areas of conferred responsibility.

=== Renaming ===
The Welsh Assembly Government was renamed Welsh Government (Llywodraeth Cymru) in practice in 2011, and in law by the Wales Act 2014.

=== Wales Act 2017 and Senedd reform ===
The Wales Act 2017 established a reserved powers model for the then National Assembly, by setting out areas of law explicitly reserved to the UK Parliament. It also provided the Assembly with powers over name, size and electoral system. The 2017 Act also conferred executive ministerial functions, or 'common law type' powers on the Welsh ministers.

The Assembly changed its name to Senedd Cymru or Welsh Parliament (or simply, the Senedd) in 2020, and the Senedd Cymru (Members and Elections) Act 2024 subsequently increased the size of the Senedd to 96 members. The 2024 Act also increased the number of Welsh ministers that may be appointed, to 17.

== Cabinet ==
Constituency offices of Cabinet Ministers and Deputy Ministers (when unknown estimated)

The government can be composed of up to 17 cabinet ministers and deputy ministers. A law officer, the Counsel General, must also be appointed. The current government is a minority administration led by Plaid Cymru.

Cabinet ministers

Portfolio	Name	Constituency	Party	Term
First Minister of Wales	Rhun ap Iorwerth MS	Bangor Conwy Môn	Plaid Cymru	May 2026 –
Deputy First Minister of Wales, Cabinet Minister for Social Justice and Equality	Sioned Williams MS	Brycheiniog Tawe Nedd	Plaid Cymru	May 2026 –
Cabinet Minister for Finance	Elin Jones MS	Ceredigion Penfro	Plaid Cymru	May 2026 –
Cabinet Minister for Government Effectiveness and the Constitution	Dafydd Trystan MS	Caerdydd Ffynnon Taf	Plaid Cymru	May 2026 –
Cabinet Minister for Local Government, Housing and Planning	Siân Gwenllian MS	Gwynedd Maldwyn	Plaid Cymru	May 2026 –
Cabinet Minister for Health and Care	Mabon ap Gwynfor MS	Gwynedd Maldwyn	Plaid Cymru	May 2026 –
Cabinet Minister for Enterprise, Connectivity and Energy	Adam Price MS	Sir Gaerfyrddin	Plaid Cymru	May 2026 –
Cabinet Minister for Rural Resilience and Sustainability	Llyr Gruffydd MS	Clwyd	Plaid Cymru	May 2026 –
Trefnydd (House Leader) and Chief Whip Cabinet Minister for Culture and Sport	Heledd Fychan MS	Pontypridd Cynon Merthyr	Plaid Cymru	May 2026 –
Cabinet Minister for Education and the Welsh Language	Anna Brychan MS	Caerdydd Penarth	Plaid Cymru	May 2026 –
Counsel General	Elfyn Llwyd	None	Plaid Cymru	May 2026 –

Deputy Ministers

Portfolio	Name	Constituency	Party	Term
Deputy Minister for Transport	Mark Hooper MS	Pen-y-bont Bro Morgannwg	Plaid Cymru	May 2026 –
Deputy Minister for Social Care, Mental Health and Women's Health	Delyth Jewell MS	Blaenau Gwent Caerffili Rhymni	Plaid Cymru	May 2026 –
Deputy Minister for Public and Preventative Health	Nerys Evans MS	Sir Gaerfyrddin	Plaid Cymru	May 2026 –
Deputy Minister for Skills and Tertiary Education	Cefin Campbell MS	Sir Gaerfyrddin	Plaid Cymru	May 2026 –

Cabinet ministers and deputy ministers were known as cabinet secretaries and ministers respectively between 2016 and 2018 (during Carwyn Jones' third government) and between 2024 and 2026 (in Vaughan Gething's and Eluned Morgan's governments). These positions returned to their original names in May 2026, following the appointment of Rhun ap Iorwerth.

== Civil service ==
The Welsh Government also includes a civil service that supports the Welsh ministers. As of March 2018, there are 5,015 full-time equivalent civil servants working across Wales. The civil service is a matter reserved to the British Parliament at Westminster: Welsh Government civil servants work within the rules and customs of His Majesty's Civil Service, but serve the devolved administration rather than the British Government.

=== Permanent secretary ===
The Permanent secretary heads the civil service of the Welsh Government and chairs the Strategic Delivery and Performance Board.

The Permanent Secretary is a member of His Majesty's Civil Service, and therefore takes part in the Permanent Secretaries Management Group of the Civil Service and is answerable to the most senior civil servant in Britain, the Cabinet Secretary, for professional conduct. The permanent secretary remains, however, at the direction of the Welsh ministers.

- Sir Jon Shortridge (May 1999 to April 2008)
- Dame Gillian Morgan (May 2008 to August 2012)
- Sir Derek Jones (October 2012 to February 2017)
- Dame Shan Elizabeth Morgan (February 2017 to 31 October 2021)
- Andrew Goodall (November 2021 to date)

=== Departments ===
- First Minister & Cabinet Office Group
  - Office of the First Minister
  - Office of the Permanent Secretary
  - Propriety and Ethics Directorate
  - Constitution Directorate
  - Office of the Legislative Counsel
  - International Relations & Overseas Network Directorate
  - Strategy Directorate
  - Cabinet Office & Outcomes Directorate
  - Welsh Treasury Directorate
  - National Security, Risk & Resilience
- Operational Effectiveness Group
  - Digital Public Services Wales Directorate
  - Finance Directorate
  - Legal Services Directorate
  - People and Places Directorate
  - Commercial and Procurement Directorate
  - Digital, Data & Technology & Knowledge and Analytical Services Directorate
  - Care Inspectorate Wales
  - Healthcare Inspectorate Wales
  - Planning and Environment Decisions Wales (PEDW)
- Local Government, Housing, Rural Resilience & Sustainability Group
  - Local Government & Planning Directorate
  - Climate Change & Environmental Sustainability Directorate
  - Housing & Regeneration Directorate
  - Office of the Chief Veterinary Officer
  - Rural Resilience Directorate
- Enterprise, Connectivity & Energy Group
  - Economic Strategy & Labour Markets Directorate
  - ECE Programmes and Capability Directorate
  - Office for the Chief Scientific Adviser for Wales
  - Economic Development Operations Directorate
  - Tourism, Marketing, Events & Creative Directorate
  - Energy Directorate
  - Transport & Connectivity Directorate
- Learning, Communities & Culture Group
  - Primary & Secondary Education Directorate
  - Skills & Tertiary Education Directorate
  - Culture, Heritage & Sport Directorate
  - Welsh Language Directorate
  - Children, Families & Tackling Poverty Directorate
  - Communities & Social Justice Directorate
- Health, Care & Prevention Group
  - Office of the Director General
  - NHS Planning & Performance Directorate
  - Office of the Chief Medical Officer for Wales
  - Nursing, Patient Experience and Safety Directorate (Office of the Chief Nursing Officer for Wales)
  - Social Care Directorate & Office of the Chief Social Care Officer for Wales
  - Public Health Directorate
  - NHS Finance Directorate
  - Primary Care & Mental Health Directorate
  - NHS Workforce & Operations Directorate
  - CAFCASS Cymru

=== The Board ===
The Welsh Government Board translates the strategic direction set by the Welsh cabinet and its committees into work that is joined up across Welsh Government departments and makes the best use of its resources. The board is made up of six directors general, six directors and four non-executive directors, and is chaired by the permanent secretary.

Board members are appointed at the discretion of and by the permanent secretary. Membership is not wholly dependent on functional responsibilities; it is designed to provide balanced advice and support to the permanent secretary, and collective leadership to the organisation as a whole.

Position	Name	Notes
Permanent Secretary of the Welsh Government	Andrew Goodall	
Chief Operating Officer & Director General, Operational Effectiveness Group	Sioned Evans	
Director General, First Minister & Cabinet Office Group	Judith Paget	
Director General, Local Government, Housing, Rural Resilience & Sustainability Group	Claire Bennett (interim)	
Director General, Enterprise, Connectivity & Energy Group	Andrew Slade	
Director General, Health, Care & Prevention Group and Chief Executive of NHS Wales	Jacqueline Totterdell (interim)	
Director General, Learning, Communities & Culture Group	Emma Williams (interim)	
Chief Legal Adviser and Director of Legal Services	Nicola Williams	
Director of Propriety & Ethics	David Richards	
Director of Finance	Dean Medcraft	
Director of People and Places	Dominic Houlihan	
non-executive director	Mike Usher	
non-executive director	Aled Edwards	
non-executive director	Carys Williams	

=== Welsh Government sponsored bodies ===
The Welsh Government is responsible for a number of Welsh Government sponsored bodies (WGSBs). These are, respectively,

- executive WGSBs, which are non-departmental public bodies such as the Arts Council of Wales;
- advisory WGSBs, which are non-departmental public bodies; and
- tribunals such as the Mental Health Review Tribunal for Wales.

WGSBs are staffed by public servants rather than civil servants.

The Welsh Government is also responsible for some public bodies that are not classed as WGSBs, such as NHS Wales, and the Welsh Offices of England and Wales legal offices.

== Estate ==
The Welsh Government has a total of 18 core and operational offices across Wales. It also has an office based in Westminster. Additionally, it has 7 specialist properties across Wales, which include stores, traffic management centres and the pavilion at the Royal Welsh Showground.

The Government also has 21 offices located in 11 countries outside the United Kingdom: Belgium; Canada; China; France; Germany; Ireland; India; Japan; Qatar; United Arab Emirates, and the United States of America.

Historically, most Welsh Office staff were based in Cardiff, especially in Cathays Park. However, in 2002, the Fullerton Review concluded that "the Assembly could no longer sustain having the majority of its operational functions located in and around Cardiff". Since 2004, Welsh Government civil servants have been relocated across Wales as part of the Location Strategy, which involved the creation of new offices at Merthyr Tydfil, Aberystwyth and Llandudno Junction. In 2006, the mergers of Education and Learning Wales, the Wales Tourist Board and the Welsh Development Agency into the Welsh Government brought these agencies' offices into the Welsh Government estate.

The First Minister has an office in Tŷ Hywel in Cardiff Bay and at the Welsh Government building in Cathays Park where the majority of Cardiff-based Welsh Government civil servants are located.

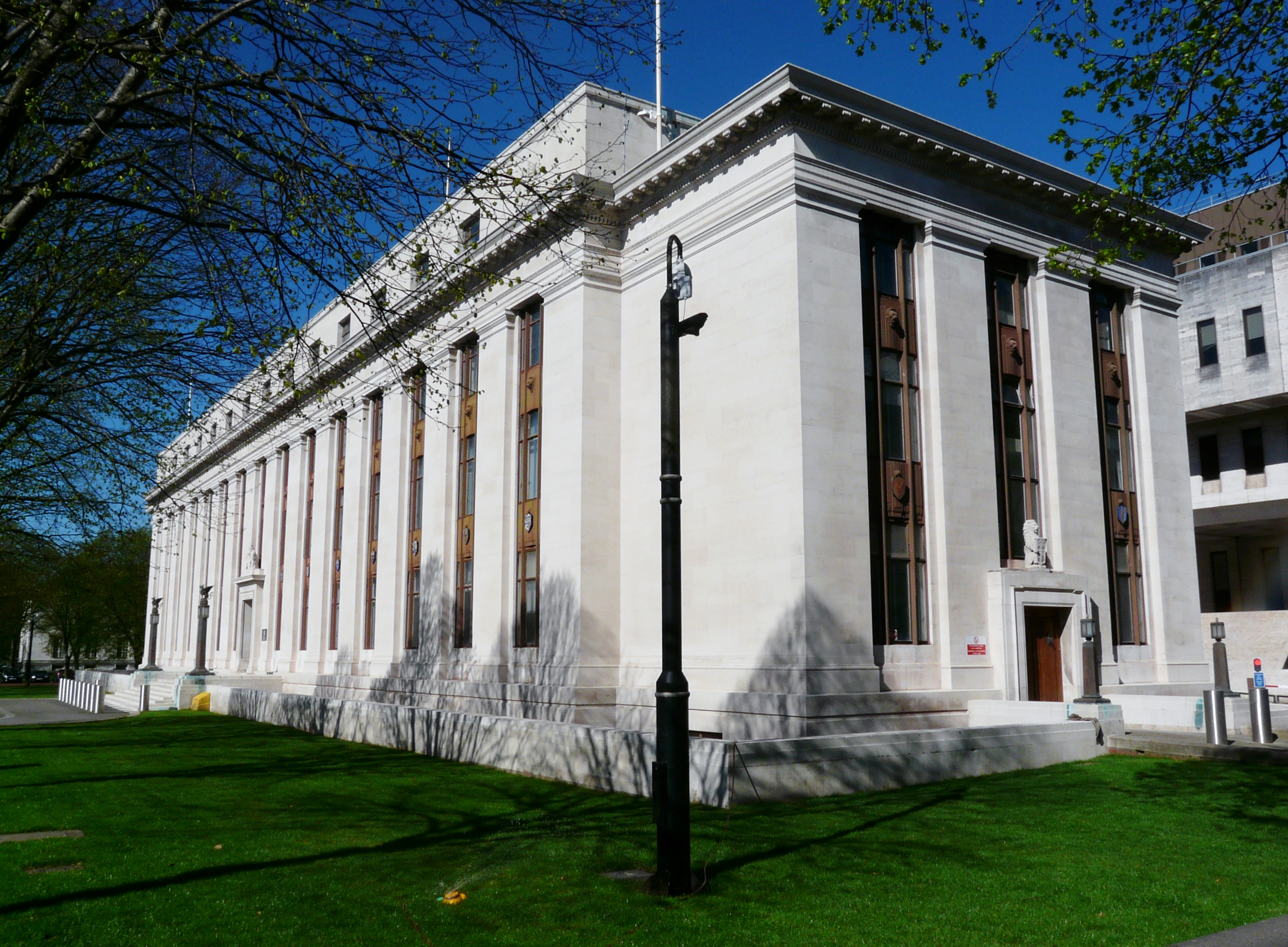
Cathays Park 1, Cathays Park, Cardiff – the original home of the Welsh Office

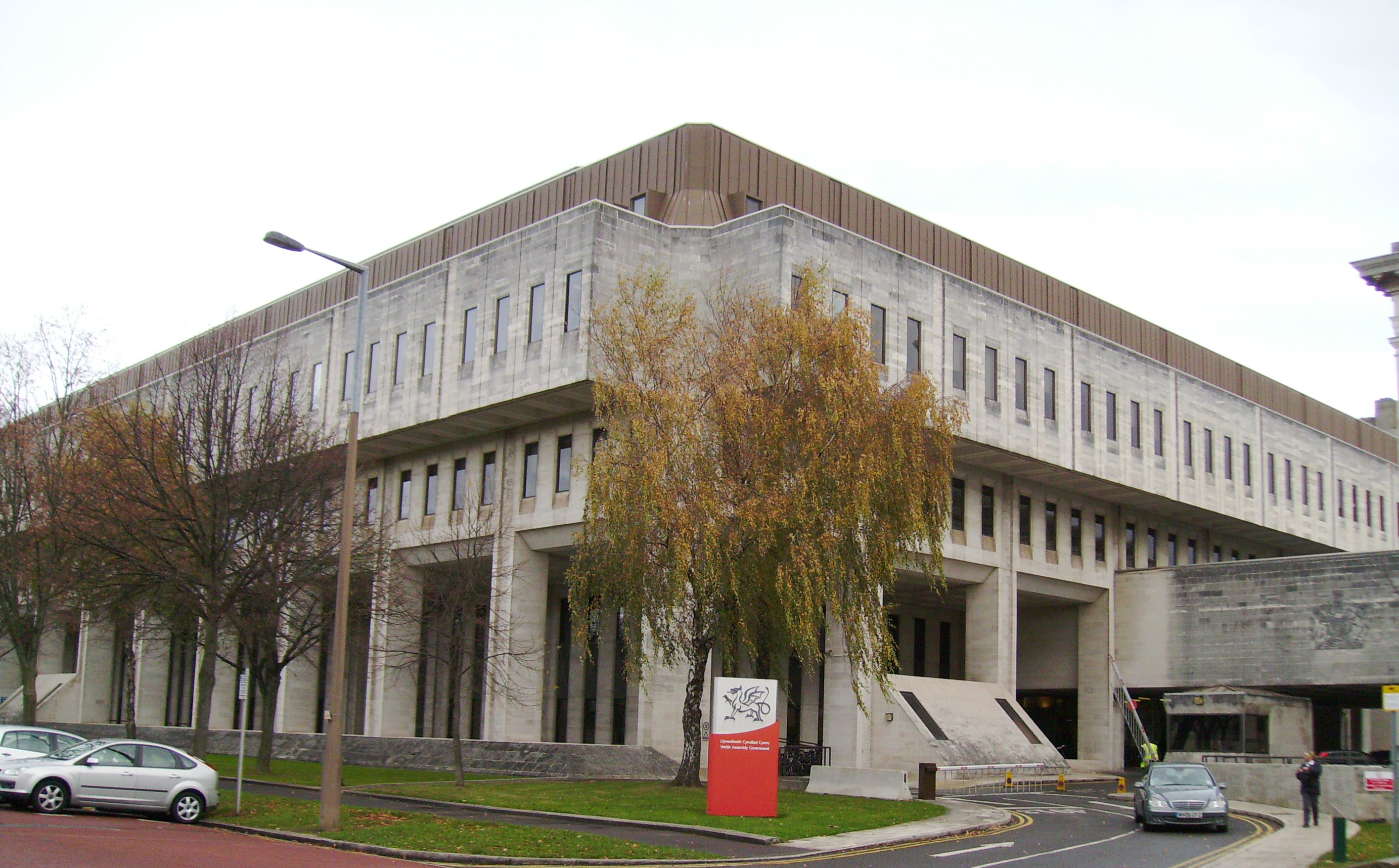
Cathays Park 2, Cathays Park is the home to many of the Welsh Government's civil servants

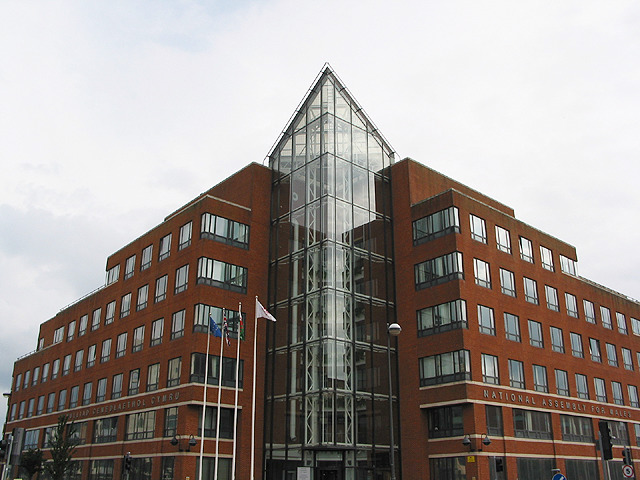
Tŷ Hywel

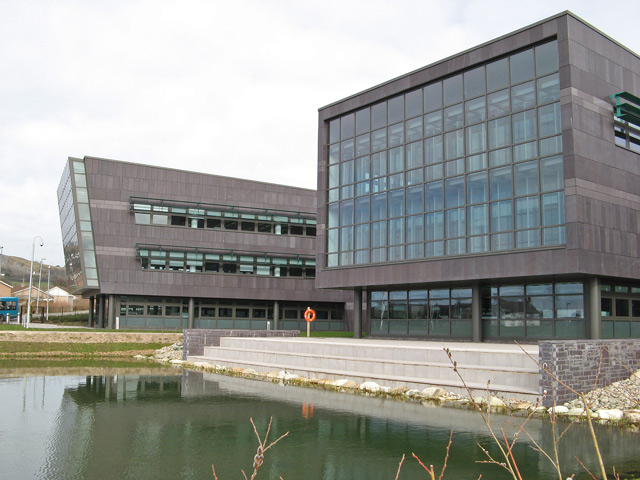
Llandudno Junction offices

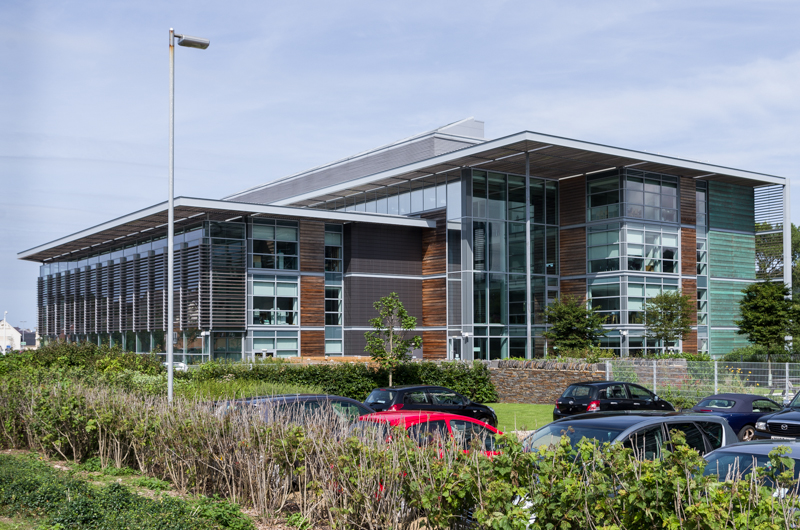
Aberystwyth offices

== Budget ==
Mark Drakeford, Cabinet Secretary for Finance discussing the forthcoming Welsh Taxes; 2017

Wales receives a budget allocation from the UK Government determined by the Barnett formula, which makes up roughly 80% of the Welsh budget. The remaining 20% comes from devolved taxes such as non-domestic rates, land transaction tax, landfill disposal tax and the Welsh rates of income tax. These taxes are collected and managed by the Welsh Revenue Authority, except for income tax which is collected by HM Revenue and Customs on behalf of the Welsh Government.

The Welsh Government sets out its spending and financing plans for the forthcoming financial year in the autumn.

The Senedd scrutinises the budget and associated taxation and spending plans.

== See also ==
- List of political parties in Wales
- List of Wales-related topics
- Government spending in the United Kingdom
- Welsh Youth Parliament
- Welsh devolution
- Welsh statutory instrument
- Marine and Fisheries Division (Wales)
