= Derek Jones (civil servant) =

Welsh civil servant

Sir Derek Jones KCB
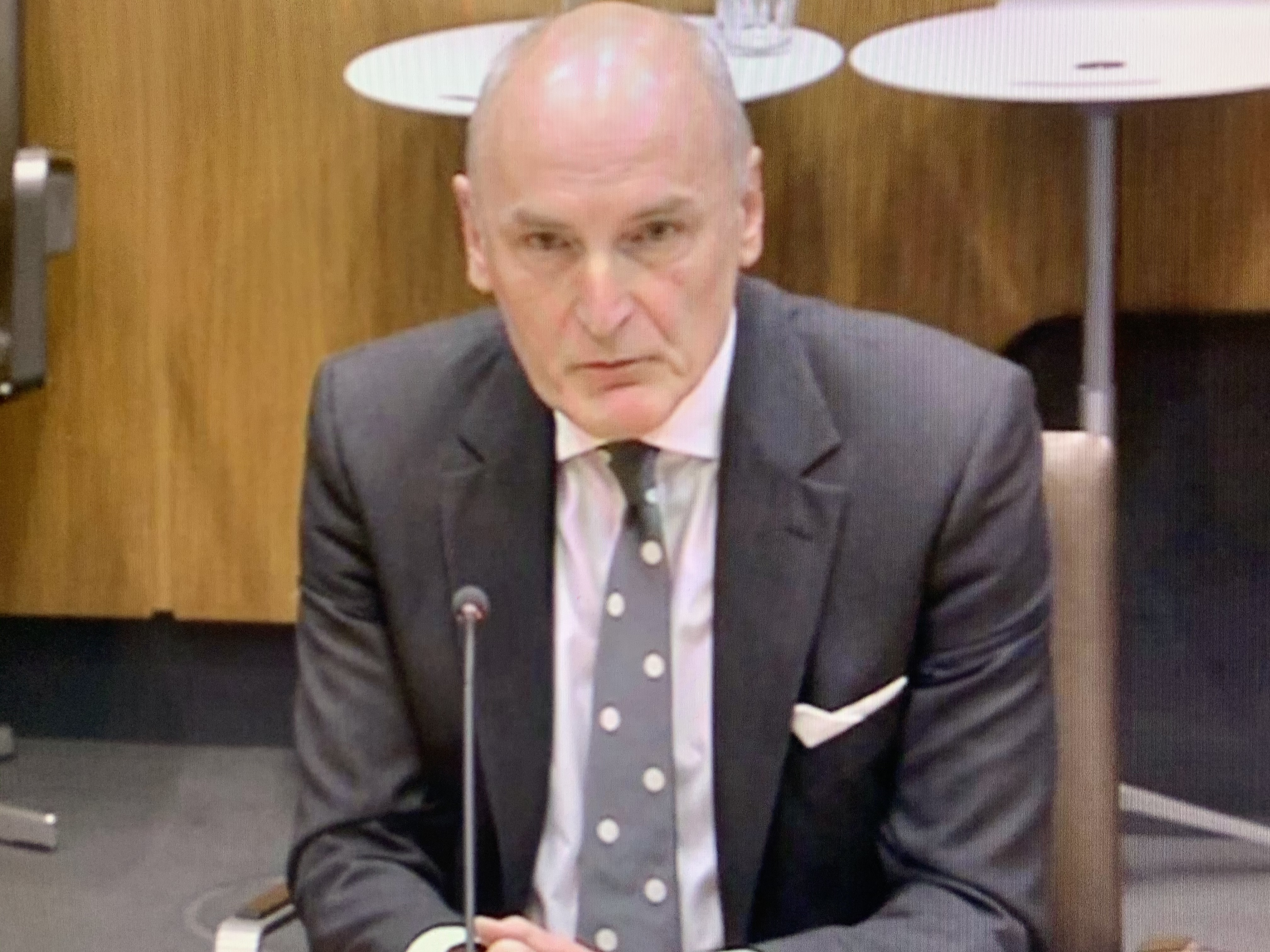
- Born: Cardiff, Wales
- Citizenship: Welsh
- Education: Cardiff University
- Occupations: Company Director, former Civil Servant
- Years active: 1973–present
- Known for: Permanent Secretary, Welsh Government (2012–2017)
- Title: Permanent Secretary, Welsh Government
- Term: 2012–2017
- Predecessor: Dame Gillian Morgan
- Successor: Shan Morgan
- Board member of: Prince’s Trust, Wales; IQE plc; Keolis UK; Cardiff University (2008–2012)
- Children: 2 sons
- Awards: Companion of the Order of the Bath (2009); Knight Commander of the Order of the Bath (2014) Honorary Professor, Cardiff University (2017)

Sir Derek William Jones, KCB is Chair of the Prince's Trust in Wales, Board Director (non-executive) of IQE, Chair of Keolis UK and served as permanent secretary to the Welsh Government between 2013 and 2017.

Jones was born in Rumney, Cardiff and studied philosophy at Cardiff University. He started his civil service career at Whitehall, London after graduation.

After undertaking the post-graduate training scheme he joined HM Treasury, and then held positions in the Department of Trade and Industry. Jones then joined the Welsh Office in Cardiff in 1989, as Head of Industrial Policy. Holding a series of finance, investment and training positions over the following decade, as Senior Director in 1999 he became a key in the setting-up and early operations of the Welsh Assembly Government.

After failing to replace Sir Jon Shortridge as permanent secretary, in 2008 Jones left the civil service to join the governing board of Cardiff University as Director of Business and Strategic Partnerships with an honorary Professorship, tasked to commercialise the college's research and engage with business.

In September 2012, Jones was announced as the new Permanent Secretary to the Welsh Assembly Government, replacing the retiring Dame Gillian Morgan. In June 2014, Jones was commissioned by First Minister Carwyn Jones to head the investigation into whether Environment Minister Alun Davies had breached the ministerial code when lobbying re the Circuit of Wales, which Jones in his report published on 1 July 2014 confirmed.

After leaving the civil service in 2017 Jones become an Independent Adviser and Honorary Fellow at Cardiff University, Vice-President of Cardiff Business Club and has taken board positions at the Prince's Trust in Wales, Keolis UK and IQE.

Married with two sons, his hobbies include surfing, keep fit and blues guitar. Appointed a Companion of the Order of the Bath in the 2009 New Year Honours, Jones was appointed Knight Commander of the Order of the Bath in the 2014 New Year Honours list.

Government offices
Preceded by Dame Gillian Morgan	Permanent Secretary to the Welsh Government; 2012–2017	Succeeded by Shan Morgan
