= Pembrey Country Park =

Country park in Carmarthenshire, Wales

Coordinates: 51.6812°N 4.3051°W

Pembrey Country Park is a country park on the coast of South Wales, located near the village of Pembrey, Carmarthenshire, and the town of Llanelli.

Pembrey Country Park consists of some 500 acres (200 ha) of parkland. Its southern edge is formed by the 8 miles (13 km) long Cefn Sidan beach. The park contains visitor attractions such as ski slopes, adventure play areas, a miniature railway, and mountain bike trails.

The park lies on the site of the former ROF Pembrey, which housed explosives during both WW1 and WW2. It was purposely built amongst sand dunes to act as camouflage and to protect the surrounding area against any possible explosions. The site was closed on March 1965 and the majority of the land was sold to the Forestry Commission, which was subsequently developed into its current use. Today, the only evidence remaining of the old munitions factory is its bunkers and some of the old railway tracks from the factories railway system.

The park hosted the start of the 2018 Tour of Britain cycle race, featuring a peloton of riders including reigning and former Tour de France champions Geraint Thomas and Chris Froome.

== Music festival ==
Beach Break Live is a music festival which was first held at the park in 2010, having been held at other venues previously. The festival is aimed at a student audience. The event is organised by a pair of entrepreneurs who secured backing from Peter Jones on TV show Dragon's Den. About 12,500 students attended the first event at Pembrey Country Park in 2010.

== Pembrey Ski and Activity Centre ==
- Ski
- Cobra Toboggan

== See also ==
- WWT National Wetlands Centre
- Millennium Coastal Park
- Pembrey Circuit
- Pembrey Airport
- Court Farm, Pembrey
