= Sandy, Carmarthenshire =

Area in Carmarthenshire, Wales

Coordinates: 51.684°N 4.176°W

Sandy (San-Dŷ meaning saint house) is an area in the county of Carmarthenshire in south-west Wales, on the western border of Llanelli town, about 5 miles (8 km) east of Burry Port.

The area is home to Sandy Water Park, a large project which has seen acres of disused industrial land converted to parkland and a lake. It now forms a part of the Millennium Coastal Park.

Sandy is adjacent to Stradey, which once contained the famous Stradey Park stadium, former home to Llanelli RFC and the Llanelli Scarlets. In 2008/09 the Scarlets moved to a new purpose-built stadium in Pemberton and Stradey Park has now been demolished.
