= Carmelo Colasanto =

Welsh politician

Carmelo Colasanto MS
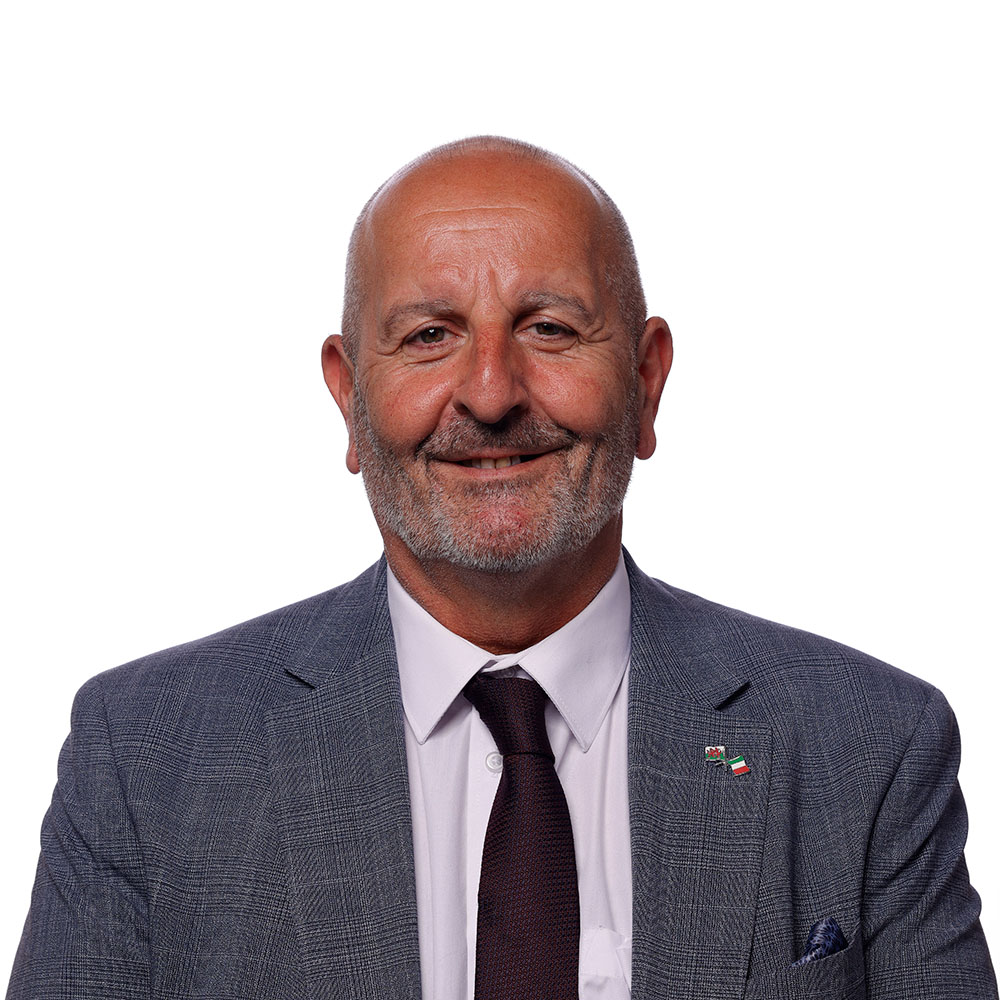
- Official portrait, 2026

Member of the Senedd for Sir Gaerfyrddin
- Incumbent
- Assumed office 8 May 2026
- Preceded by: Constituency established

Personal details
- Born: 1964 (age 61–62) Baden, Aargau, Switzerland
- Party: Reform UK

Carmelo Colasanto (born 1964) is a Welsh politician who has been a Member of the Senedd for Sir Gaerfyrddin since 2026, representing Reform UK.

== Early life ==
Colasanto was born in Baden, Switzerland, to parents from southern Italy, and moved to Wales with his parents in 1970.

== Career and political career ==
Before participating in politics, Colasanto worked in senior positions in the retail and business sector.

Colasanto was the Reform candidate for the 2025 Llangennech by-election in Carmarthenshire, coming in 1st with 694 votes.

Colasanto was selected in the second position on the Reform seat list for the Sir Gaerfyrddin seat in the 2026 Senedd election. He was elected on the 7 May.

== Personal life ==
He lives in Llanelli with his family including two children.
