= Gillian Morgan =

British civil servant (born 1953)

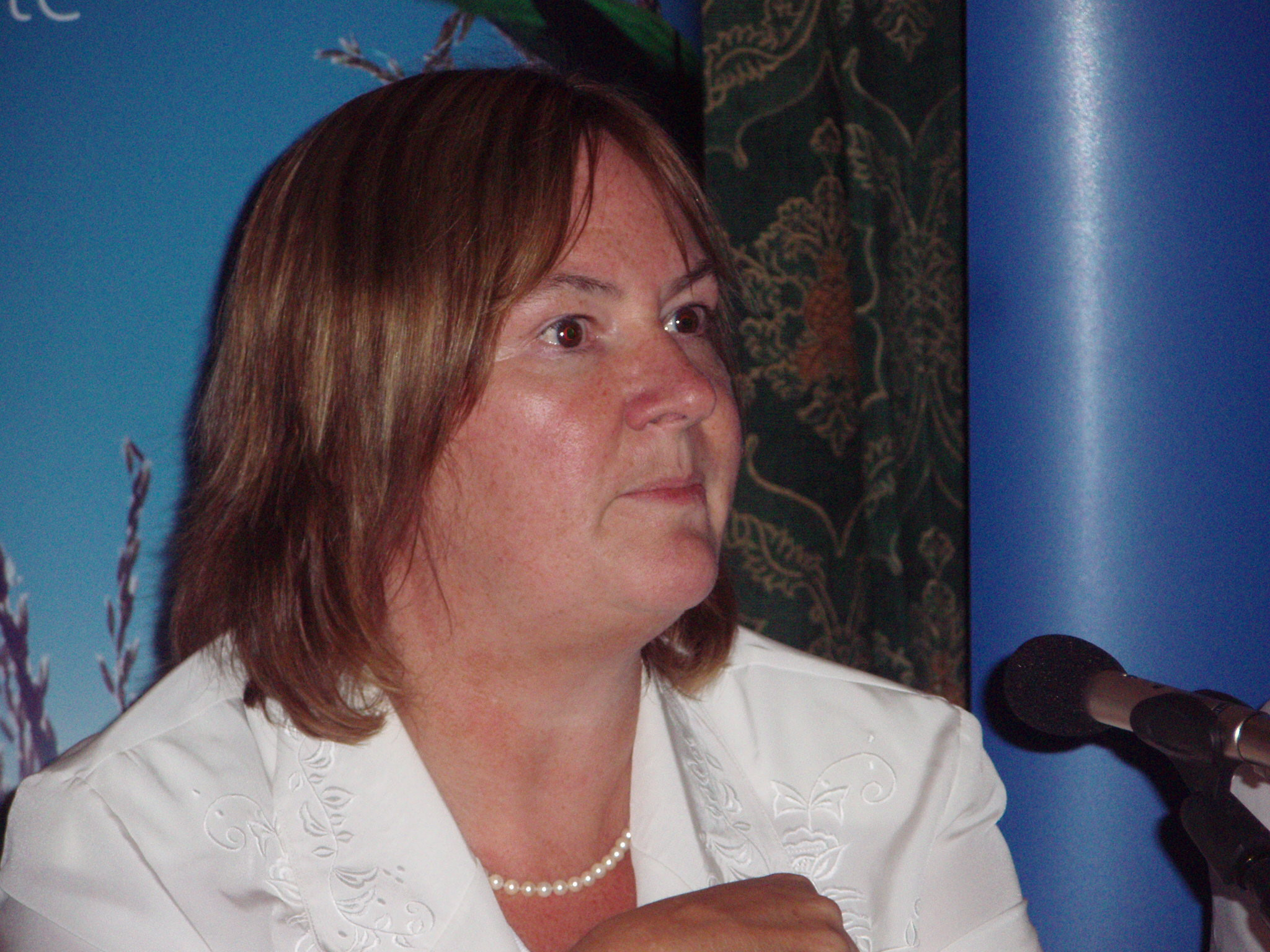
Labour Party conference 2007

Dame Gillian Morgan DBE (born 1953 in Llwynypia) is a British civil servant. She was Permanent Secretary to the Welsh Assembly Government between May 2008 and August 2012. She has also worked in healthcare and healthcare management and is currently the independent chair of the One Gloucestershire integrated care system.

== Professional career ==
=== Healthcare ===
Morgan's career has been mainly in healthcare, both in medicine and management, and includes a period as Chief Executive of North and East Devon Health Authority. She has worked as a doctor in hospitals, in general practice and in public health medicine, working both as a consultant and as the Director of Public Health for Leicestershire. She is a Fellow of the Royal College of Physicians and the Faculty of Public Health and a member of the Royal College of General Practitioners.

She was President of the Institute of Health Services Management in 1997–98 and is a past President of the International Hospital Federation. At the turn of the century, Morgan was chief executive of the North & East Devon Health Authority, based in Exeter where her husband taught at Exeter School. She was chief executive of the NHS Confederation from 2002 to 2008, chair of NHS Providers from 2014 to December 2019, and since January 2020 is the independent chair of the One Gloucestershire integrated care system.

While working in healthcare, Morgan served on a number of national committees and working groups and was a member of the NHS Stakeholder Forum. She was one of the three members of the review team led by Sir Jeremy Beecham, set up in 2006 to advise the Welsh Assembly Government on the reform of public services in Wales.

She was made a Dame Commander of the Order of the British Empire in June 2004 and was awarded Honorary Doctor of Science by The City University, London, in May 2006.

=== Welsh Assembly Government ===
Morgan was appointed as Permanent Secretary (head of the civil service) to the Welsh Assembly Government on 1 May 2008. She retired from the post in August 2012.

== Offices held ==
Government offices
Preceded by Sir Jon Shortridge	Permanent Secretary to the Welsh Assembly Government; 2008–2012	Succeeded by Derek Jones
