= Gareth Beer =

Welsh politician

Gareth Beer MS
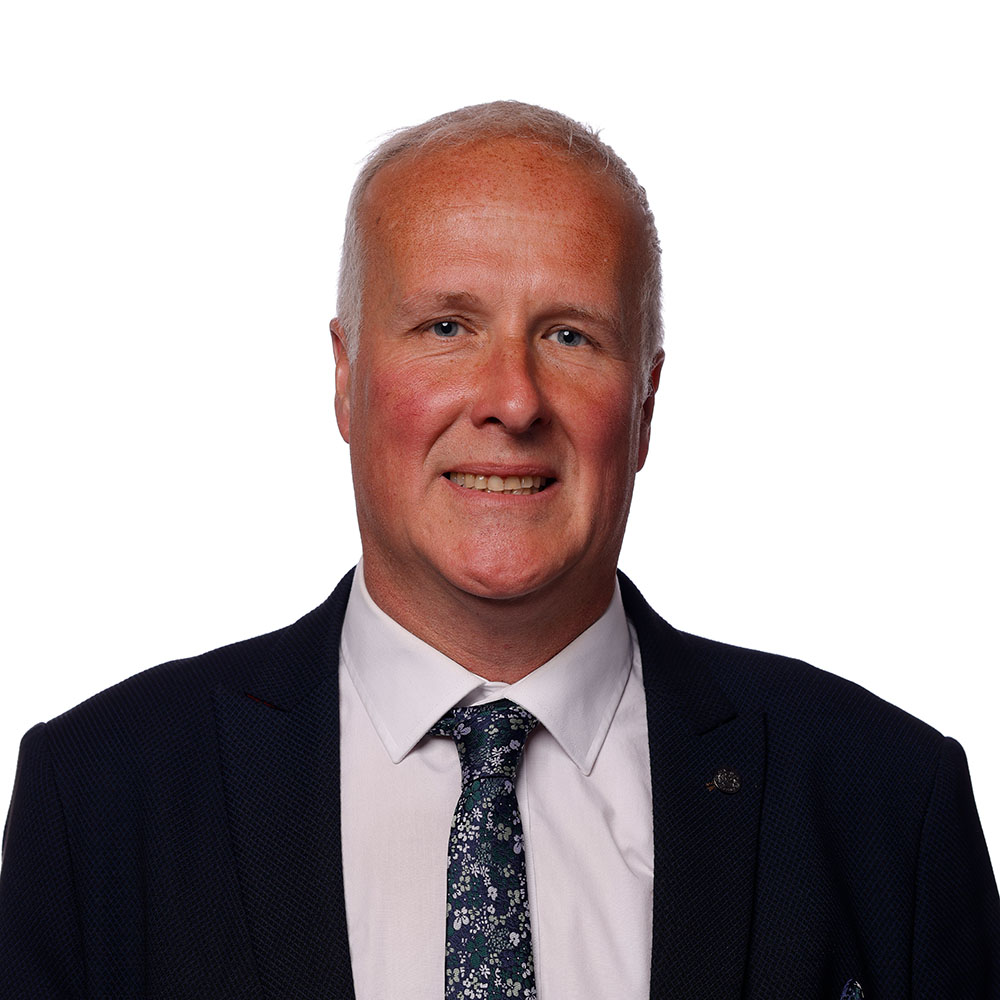
- Official portrait, 2026

Member of the Senedd for Sir Gaerfyrddin
- Incumbent
- Assumed office 8 May 2026
- Preceded by: Constituency established

Kidwelly Town Councillor for Castle ward
- Incumbent
- Assumed office 5 May 2022

Personal details
- Born: Gareth David Beer; May 1976
- Party: Reform UK
- Spouse: Michelle Beer
- Children: 4

Gareth David Beer (born 1976) is a Reform UK Wales politician, who has served as Member of the Senedd for Sir Gaerfyrddin since May 2026. He has also represented the Castle ward on Kidwelly Town Council since May 2022.

== Early life and business life ==
Beer was born in Pontypool and moved to Carmarthenshire in 2001. He worked in telecommunications retail management before creating his own businesses in construction services in 2006.

== Political career ==
Beer was Reform's candidate for the Llanelli Senedd constituency at the 2021 Senedd election. He received 2.2% of the vote.

In 2023 Beer was an active part of the Stradey Park protests against the converting of a hotel in Furnace, Llanelli into accommodation for asylum seekers.

He further ran for the UK parliament, again to represent Llanelli at the 2024 general election. In this election, he came second, 1504 votes behind Labour's Nia Griffith, with 27.6% of the vote.

Beer took office as a councillor on Kidwelly Town Council representing the Castle Ward in May 2022, following an uncontested election.

Beer was selected as Reform's lead candidate in the Sir Gaerfyrddin constituency at the 2026 Senedd election. He was elected as the second candidate to be assigned a seat.

== Personal life ==
Beer is married to Michelle Beer, who is a Reform councillor on Carmarthenshire County Council. Michelle is the first Reform UK councillor elected in Carmarthenshire and was also on the list for the Senedd, but was not elected, being further down the list than her husband.

They have 4 children.

== See also ==
- 7th Senedd
