= Kidwelly Town Council =

Community council in Carmarthenshire, Wales

Coordinates: 51.736042°N 4.312335°W

Kidwelly Town Council Cyngor Tref Cydweli
- Interactive map of Kidwelly Town Council

Government
  - Mayor: Cllr. Laura Jones (Ind)
  - Deputy Mayor: Cllr. Damien Jones (Ind)
  - Castle Ward Councillors: Laura Jones (Ind); Heike Griffiths (Ind); John MacLaughland (Ind); Carol Morgan (Ind); Damian Jones (Ind); Amanda Evans (Ind); Nicola Jones (Ind); John Dobson (Ind)
  - Mynyddgarreg Ward Councillors: Carl Peters-Bond (Ind); Chris Peters-Bond (Ind); Jeanette Gilasbey (Plaid); Liz Reeves-Davies (Ind); Helen Rees-Griffiths (Ind)
- Website: www.kidwelly.gov.uk

Kidwelly Town Council (Welsh: Cyngor Tref Cydweli) is the town council serving the town of Kidwelly and the village of Mynydd-y-Garreg in the county of Carmarthenshire, Wales.

== Background ==
Kidwelly Town Council consists of 16 Councillors. The council appoints a Mayor, known as the Mayor of Kidwelly and Mynydd Y Garreg, and takes care of local issues, such as Kidwelly Quay, the Town Cemetery, Christmas Lighting, the Church Clock, Glan yr Afon Nature reserve, the War Memorial and Remembrance Garden. It also manages a large estate and promotes local tourism.

The town council is taking over responsibility of the playgrounds from Carmarthenshire County Council, under an asset transfer scheme. Alongside taking over the running of the public conveniences in the town.

2015 was the 900th celebration of the establishment of the town of Kidwelly.

The council offices are to be found to the rear of the Princess Gwenllian Centre on Hillfield Villas, Kidwelly. New purpose-built council offices and Council Chamber were opened May 2018.

== Council composition ==
The May 2017 election was uncontested, because fewer nominations being made than the number of places available. It left the town council with the option of co-opting additional members.

Composition as of May 2017
| Affiliation | Members |
|---|---|
| Welsh Labour | 7 |
| Independent | 4 |
| Plaid Cymru | 1 |
| UKIP | 1 |
| Welsh Conservative Party | 1 |
| Vacant | 2 |
| Total | 16 |

== In the news ==
Kidwelly Town Council made the UK news in 2015 when charges were dropped against former deputy mayor, Ryan Thomas, who had been accused of groping a woman during the 2014 mayoral ceremony. He made a full apology for his drunken behaviour and had resigned from the council after his arrest.

Carl Peters-Bond served his fourth successive term of office as mayor - the longest for 145 years in the historic town - during the 2025 / 2026 term.
