= List of schools in Carmarthenshire =

This is a list of schools in Carmarthenshire in Wales.

== State primary schools ==
- Abergwili VC Primary School
- Abernant Community Primary School
- Bancffosfelen Community Primary School
- Bancyfelin Community Primary School
- Beca Community Primary School
- Betws Community Primary School
- Bigyn Community Primary School
- Blaenau Community Primary School
- Brechfa Community Primary School
- Bro Banw Community Primary School
- Bro Brynach Community Primary School
- Bryn Community Primary School
- Bryn Teg Llanelli Community Primary School
- Brynaman Community Primary School
- Brynsaron Community Primary School
- Burry Port Community Primary School
- Bynea Community Primary School
- Caeo Community Primary School
- Cae'r Felin Community Primary School
- Carreg Hirfaen Community Primary School
- Carwe Community Primary School
- Cefneithin Community Primary School
- Cil-y-cwm VC Primary School
- Copperworks Community Primary School
- Cross Hands Community Primary School
- Cwrt Henri Community Primary School
- Cynwyl Elfed Community Primary School
- Dafen Community Primary School
- Drefach Community Primary School
- Ferryside VC Primary School
- Ffairfach Community Primary School
- Ffwrnes Community Primary School
- Five Roads Community Primary School
- Gors-las Community Primary School
- Griffith Jones Community Primary School
- Gwenllian Community Primary School
- Gwynfryn Community Primary School
- Gymraeg Brynsierfel Community Primary School
- Gymraeg Dewi Sant Community Primary School
- Gymraeg Rhydaman Community Primary School
- Hafodwenog Community Primary School
- Halfway Community Primary School
- Hendy Community Primary School
- Johnstown Community Primary School
- Lakefield Community Primary School
- Laugharne VC Primary School
- Llanddarog VC Primary School
- Llandeilo Community Primary School
- Llandybie Community Primary School
- Llanedi Community Primary School
- Llanfynydd VA Primary School
- Llangadog Community Primary School
- Llan-gain Community Primary School
- Llangennech Primary School
- Llangynnwr Community Primary School
- Llanllwni VC Primary School
- Llanmiloe Community Primary School
- Llannon Community Primary School
- Llanpumsaint Community Primary School
- Llansadwrn Community Primary School
- Llansawel Community Primary School
- Llansteffan Community Primary School
- Llanllwni VC Primary School
- Llanwrda Community Primary School
- Llanybydder Community Primary School
- Llechyfedach Community Primary School
- Llys Hywel Community Primary School
- Maes y Morfa Community Primary School
- Maes-y-bont Community Primary School
- Meidrim Community Primary School
- Model VA Primary School
- Mynydd y garreg Community Primary School
- Myrddin Community Primary School
- Nantgaredig Community Primary School
- Old Road C.P. School
- Parc y Tywyn Community Primary School
- Parc-yr-hun Community Primary School
- Pembrey Community Primary School
- Penboyr VA Primary School
- Peniel Community Primary School
- Pentip VA Primary School
- Penygaer Community Primary School
- Penygroes Community Primary School
- Pont-henri Community Primary School
- Pont-iets Community Primary School
- Pontyberem Community Primary School
- Pwll Community Primary School
- Rhys Prichard Llandovery Community Primary School
- Richmond Park Community Primary School
- St Mary's VA Primary School
- St Mary's RC Primary School
- Saron Community Primary School
- Stebonheath Community Primary School
- Swiss Valley Community Primary School
- Talley Community Primary School
- Teilo Sant Community Primary School
- Tremoilet VC Primary School
- Trimsaran Community Primary School
- Tycroes Community Primary School
- Tymbl Community Primary School
- Y Bedol Community Primary School
- Y Castell Community Primary School
- Y Dderwen Community Primary School
- Y Ddwylan Community Primary School
- Y Felin Community Primary School
- Y Fro Community Primary School

== State secondary schools ==
- Bro Myrddin Welsh Comprehensive School
- Bryngwyn Comprehensive School
- Coedcae School
- Glan-y-Mor Comprehensive School
- Queen Elizabeth High School
- St John Lloyd Catholic Comprehensive School
- Ysgol Bro Dinefwr
- Ysgol Dyffryn Aman
- Ysgol Dyffryn Taf School
- Ysgol Gyfun Emlyn
- Ysgol Maes Y Gwendraeth
- Ysgol y Strade

== Special schools ==
- Coleg Elidyr
- Heol Goffa Special School
- Rhydygors Special School

== Independent schools ==
- Llandovery College
- St Michael's School, Llanelli
