= Millennium Coastal Park =

Park in Carmarthenshire, Wales

Coordinates: 51.6853°N 4.1983°W

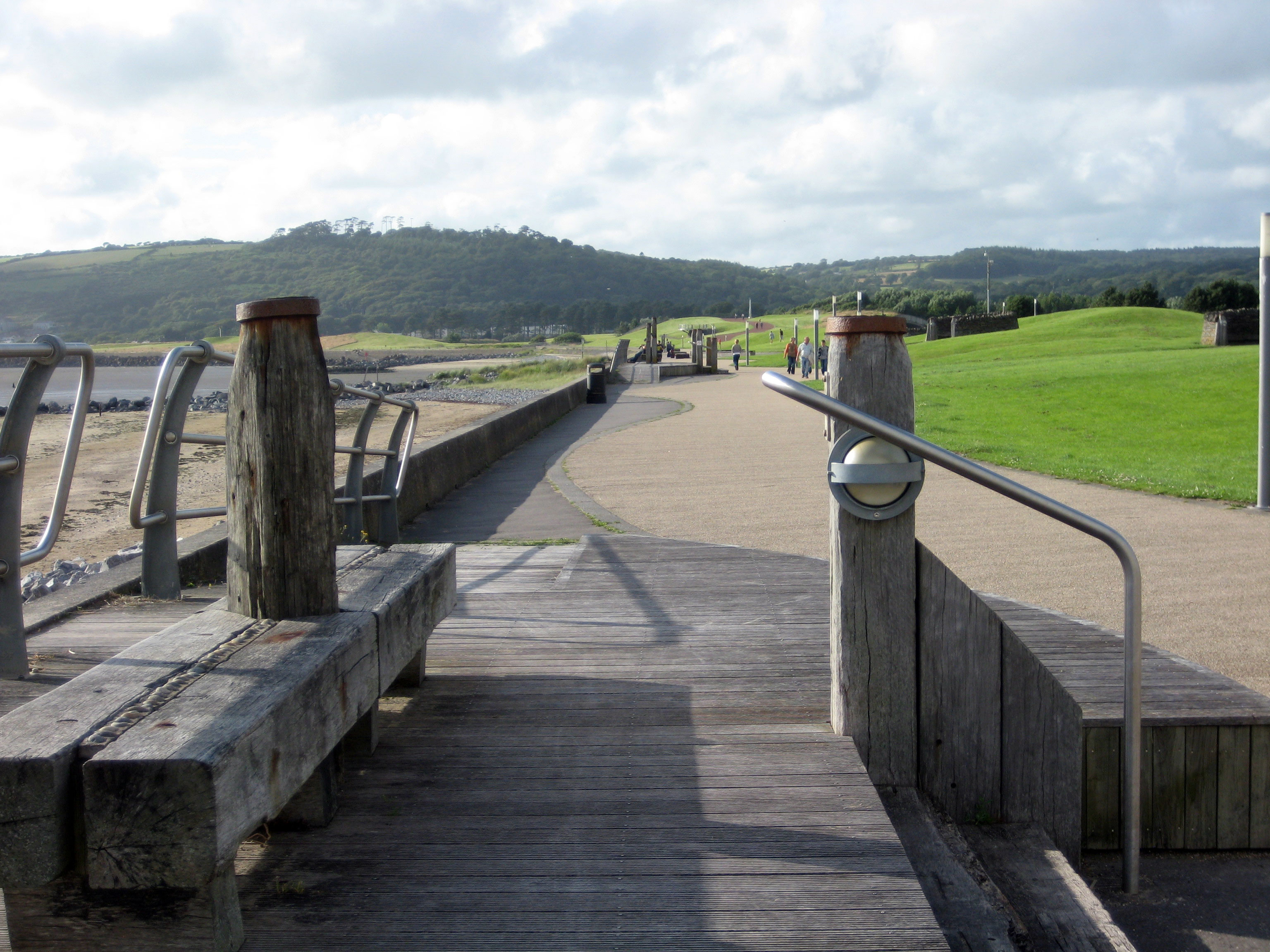
Part of the Millennium Coastal Path at Llanelli

The Millennium Coastal Park was originally a project undertaken by Llanelli Borough Council to transform a 12 miles stretch of industrial wasteland on the south Carmarthenshire coast into green parkland. The project was then taken over by Carmarthenshire County Council after the amalgamation of Welsh local authorities and the land was transformed into a landscaped recreational area for the general public. The park is 1000 hectares in area, cost £35 million to develop and in 2002 was awarded a Civic Trust Award. It has extensive views over the Lloughor Estuary to the Gower Peninsula. It includes a cycle track which provides traffic-free cycling and has been described as "one of the finest stretches of the whole National Cycle Network". Another feature is a wave-shaped, grass-covered landform, created from 115,000 cubic metres (4,100,000 cu ft) pulverised fuel ash, a form of "land art".

Another part of the project is the Burry Port Marina which provides berthing for 250 craft in three harbours. The Discovery Centre on the waterfront provides information on the park and its facilities. The Lloughor estuary is a Site of Special Scientific Interest and is within the Carmarthen Bay Special Area of Conservation. The Millennium Coastal Park offers various wildlife habitats such as wetlands and rough grassland, and these are preserved in the Pwll Lagoon Local Nature Reserve, the Ashpits Pond Local Nature Reserve and the North Dock Dunes Local Nature Reserve.

The park offers views of the Gower Peninsula on the other side of the Loughor estuary, and features a variety of visitor attractions including the North Dock visitor centre, National Wetlands Centre Wales at Penclacwydd and Sandy Water Park. The Millennium Coastal Path (a stretch of the Celtic Trail cycle route, also known as National Cycle Route 4) runs through the park.

== See also ==
- WWT National Wetlands Centre
