= Deputy Minister for Public and Preventative Health =

Minister of the Welsh Government

Deputy Minister for Public and Preventative Health of Wales
- Dirprwy Weinidog dros Iechyd Cyhoeddus ac Ataliol

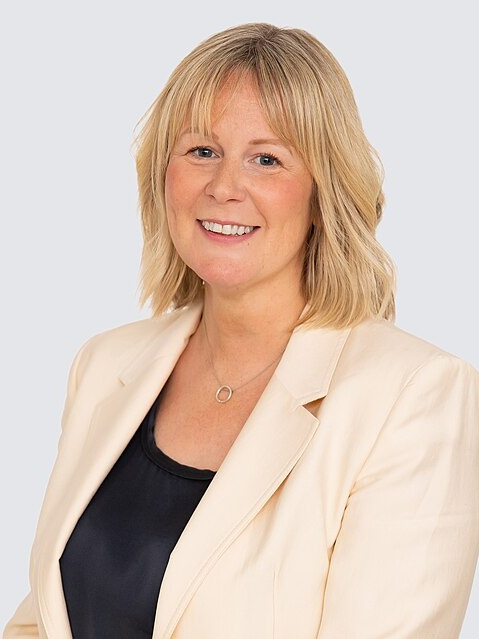
- Incumbent; Nerys Evans MS since 13 May 2026
- Welsh Government
- Style: Welsh Deputy Minister
- Status: Deputy Minister
- Member of: Senedd; Cabinet
- Reports to: the Senedd, the First Minister of Wales and the Cabinet Secretary for Health and Social Care
- Seat: Cardiff
- Nominator: First Minister of Wales
- Appointer: The Crown
- Term length: Four years; Subject to elections to the Senedd which take place every four years
- First holder: Nerys Evans MS
- Salary: £101,443 (MS pay + £25,063 Deputy Minister pay)

The Deputy Minister for Public and Preventative Health (Welsh: Dirprwy Weinidog dros Iechyd Cyhoeddus ac Ataliol) is a minister of the Welsh Government, accountable to the cabinet and the Cabinet Minister for Health and Care. The current officeholder is Nerys Evans since May 2026. The standalone role was first established in the Ap Iorwerth government with responsibilities previously lying with the Minister for Mental Health and Wellbeing and the Deputy Minister for Social Care, Mental Health and Women's Health.

== Deputy minister ==
Name	Picture	Entered office	Left office	Political party	Government	Notes
Deputy Minister for Public and Preventative Health
Nerys Evans		13 May 2026	Incumbent	Plaid Cymru	ap Iorwerth government	

== Responsibilities ==
The post's responsibilities are:

- Cross-government lead on Preventative Health
- Public Health
- Emergency prevention, preparedness and response for health including pandemic preparedness
- Health protection
- Health improvement
- Addiction services
- Health impact of problem gambling
- Tobacco and vaping
- Substance misuse
- Food Standards Agency in Wales, including food safety
- Physical activity and active recreation in Wales
- Health improvement and wellbeing services
- Obesity

== See also ==
- Ministry
