= Sir Gaerfyrddin (constituency) =

Senedd constituency (from 2026)

- County multi-member constituency for the Senedd
- Boundary of Sir Gaerfyrddin in Wales
- Principal areas: Carmarthenshire
- Preserved county: Dyfed
- Population: 190,800 (2024)
- Major settlements: Ammanford, Burry Port, Carmarthen, Kidwelly, Laugharne, Llandovery, Llanelli

Current County multi-member constituency
- Created: 2026
- Seats: 6
- Created from: UK Parliament boundaries: Caerfyrddin; Llanelli; Previous Senedd constituencies: Carmarthen East and Dinefwr; Carmarthen West and South Pembrokeshire; Llanelli; Previous Senedd region: Mid and West Wales

Sir Gaerfyrddin (Welsh for 'Carmarthenshire';) is a six-member constituency of the Senedd (Welsh Parliament; Welsh: Senedd Cymru) used in the 2026 Senedd election. It covers Carmarthenshire in West Wales.

It was proposed following the 2026 review of Senedd constituencies, and is a pairing of the two UK Parliament constituencies of Caerfyrddin and Llanelli. It has a Welsh-only name.

== Boundaries ==
The borders of the constituency are the same as those of the county of Carmarthenshire.

A Senedd constituency comprising the boundaries of the UK Parliament constituencies of Caerfyrddin and Llanelli, has been proposed by the Democracy and Boundary Commission Cymru for the 2026 election to the Senedd (Welsh Parliament; Senedd Cymru). It was initially proposed using the English name Carmarthenshire in September 2024, but was renamed to Sir Gâr in December proposals with most constituencies using Welsh-only names. It was then given the Welsh-only name Sir Gaerfyrddin and its boundaries were confirmed in the commission's final recommendations in March 2025. When announcing their candidates, Reform UK used "Caerfyrddin, Llanelli" instead, using the names for the pair of UK Parliament constituencies that form it.

The constituency was established in 2026, following the passing of the Senedd Cymru (Members and Elections) Act 2024. The act legislates electoral reform of the Senedd to create 16 larger "super constituencies", pairing the 32 UK Parliament constituencies in Wales, and using a new fully proportional voting system, with each constituency electing six Members of the Senedd (MSs) rather than one previously.

== Members of the Senedd ==
Term	Election	Distribution	MS	MS	MS	MS	MS	MS
7th	2026	3 / 3	Cefin Campbell (PC)	Gareth Beer (Ref)	Nerys Evans (PC)	Carmelo Colasanto (Ref)	Adam Price (PC)	Sarah Edwards (Ref)

== Elections ==
=== Elections in the 2020s ===
2026 Senedd election: Sir Gaerfyrddin
Party	Candidate	Votes	%	±%
Plaid Cymru	Cefin Campbell (E) Nerys Evans (E) Adam Price (E) Mari Arthur Iwan Griffiths Abi Thomas Taylor Reynolds Jordan Griffiths	36,160	43.1	▲9.5
Reform	Gareth Beer (E) Carmelo Colasanto (E) Sarah Edwards (E) Christopher Brooke Alan Cole Michelle Beer	27,542	32.8	▲31.7
Labour	Calum Higgins Dawn Evans Martyn Palfreman David Darkin Lewis Davies Andre McPherson	6,458	7.7	▼25.0
Conservative	Richard Williams Lee Stabbins Oliver Martin Wilson Bradley Williams Natasha Rowlands Ben Samsone	5,853	7.0	▼13.4
Green	Rob James Nick Pearce Craig Davies David Lishman Helen Draper Michael Willis	3,832	4.6	▲1.1
Liberal Democrats	Justin Griffiths Julian Tandy Jon Burree Lynne Wilkins Monica French Caryl Tandy Maggie Robinson	1,662	2.0	▼0.1
Independent	Stephen Williams	1,298	1.5	▲1.5
Heritage	Jason Barker	496	0.6	▲0.6
Gwlad	Wayne Erasmus	327	0.4	▲0.3
Independent	Carl Peters-Bond	254	0.3	▲0.3
Independent	Jonathan Rose (Note: was a member of the Official Monster Raving Loony Party on registration of candidacy date)	101	0.1	▲0.1
Majority		8,618	10.3	New
Turnout		83,983	55.8	▲2.8
Registered electors		150,481		

2021 notional result (Note: Estimate of the 2021 Senedd election result as if the revised boundaries recommended under the 2026 boundary review were in place)
Party	Vote	%	Seats
Labour	26,572	34.8	3
Plaid Cymru	26,208	34.3	2
Conservative	17,273	22.6	1
Liberal Democrats	2,079	2.7	0
Reform UK	1,663	2.2	0
UKIP	1,122	1.5	0
Independent	894	1.2	0
Gwlad	544	0.7	0
