= Sarah Edwards (Welsh politician) =

Welsh politician

Sarah Edwards MS
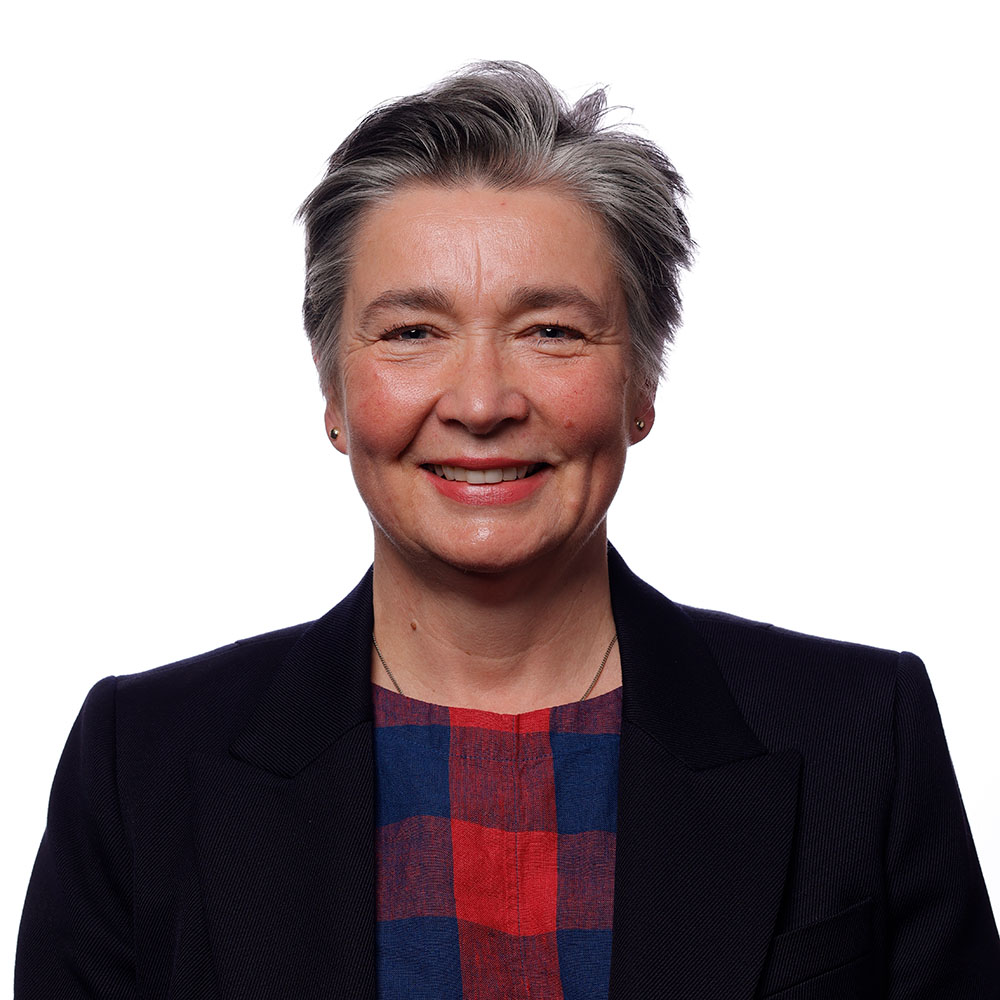
- Official portrait, 2026

Member of the Senedd for Sir Gaerfyrddin
- Incumbent
- Assumed office 8 May 2026
- Preceded by: Constituency established

Personal details
- Party: Reform UK

Sarah Elizabeth Edwards is a Reform UK Wales politician serving as Member of the Senedd for Sir Gaerfyrddin.

== Career and personal life ==
Edwards was a dental professional. She lives on a smallholding.
