= Nerys Evans =

Welsh politician (born 1980)

Nerys Evans MS
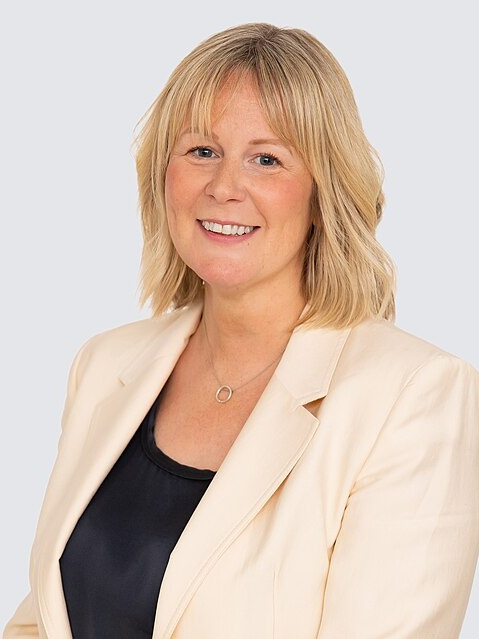
- Official portrait, 2026

Deputy Minister for Public and Preventative Health
- Incumbent
- Assumed office 13 May 2026
- Preceded by: Position established

Member of the Senedd (Note: Stylized as "Member of the Welsh Assembly" from 2007 to 2011)
- Incumbent
- Assumed office 8 May 2026
- Preceded by: Constituency established
- Constituency: Sir Gaerfyrddin
- In office 3 May 2007 – 5 May 2011
- Preceded by: Multi-member constituency
- Succeeded by: Multi-member constituency
- Constituency: Mid and West Wales

Personal details
- Born: Elizabeth Gwendoline Nerys Evans; 1980 (age 45–46) Llangain, Wales
- Party: Plaid Cymru
- Education: University of Manchester, Cardiff University

Elizabeth Gwendoline Nerys Evans (born 1980) is a Welsh Plaid Cymru politician. She has been the Member of the Senedd (MS) for Sir Gaerfyrddin and Deputy Minister for Public and Preventative Health since 2026. She was previously a member of the National Assembly for Wales representing the Mid and West Wales region from 2007 to 2011.

== Background ==
Evans was born in Llangain near Carmarthen. She was educated at Bro Myrddin Welsh Comprehensive School, and Manchester University where she obtained a BA in Government and Political Theory, followed by Cardiff University where she was awarded a MSc in Welsh Politics in 2004.

== Political career ==
She became an organiser for Plaid Cymru in Carmarthen East and Dinefwr and worked as press officer for the Plaid Cymru group on Carmarthenshire County Council. More recently she worked as a Political Officer for Plaid Cymru in the National Assembly for Wales in Cardiff.

In 2006, Evans was chosen to head the Plaid Cymru list in Mid and West Wales for the 2007 Assembly election, replacing the previous list leader Helen Mary Jones, who moved to the Llanelli constituency. She was elected.

Her political interests include rural affairs, voter apathy and workers' rights. She was Plaid Cymru's Education Spokesperson from 2009 – 2011. She was chair of the Assembly Cross Party group for Broadband in rural Wales, she sat on the Assembly's Enterprise and Learning committee and is a former chair of the Broadcasting Sub Committee. In 2008 Evans won the annual ITV Wales Campaigner of The Year award for her campaigning work on domestic abuse issues.

Evans was the Director of Policy for Plaid Cymru and authored their 2011 Assembly Manifesto.

In 2011 she was appointed as an Education commissioner in Blaenau Gwent County Council by the Welsh Government

Evans contested the Carmarthen West and South Pembrokeshire seat for the 2011 National Assembly for Wales elections, finishing in third place, and thus lost her seat in the Assembly.

In 2012, Evans co-founded the Deryn Public Affairs Agency, alongside Cathy Owens, a former Welsh Labour Government special adviser.

In December 2022 Evans was chosen by Adam Price to write a report on the allegations of bullying and sexual harassment within Plaid Cymru. Prosiect Pawb report was published in May 2023 concluding that there was "a culture of harassment, bullying and misogyny" within the party, this led to Adam Price stepping down as leader on 10 May.

In the 2026 Senedd election, Evans was elected as a MS, representing the Sir Gaerfyrddin Senedd constituency. On 13 May 2026, First Minister Rhun ap Iorwerth announced his first ministerial team, appointing Evans as Deputy Minister for Public and Preventative Health.

== Offices held ==
Senedd
New constituency	Member of the Senedd for Sir Gaerfyrddin; 2026–present	Incumbent
