= Shan Morgan =

British civil servant (born 1955)

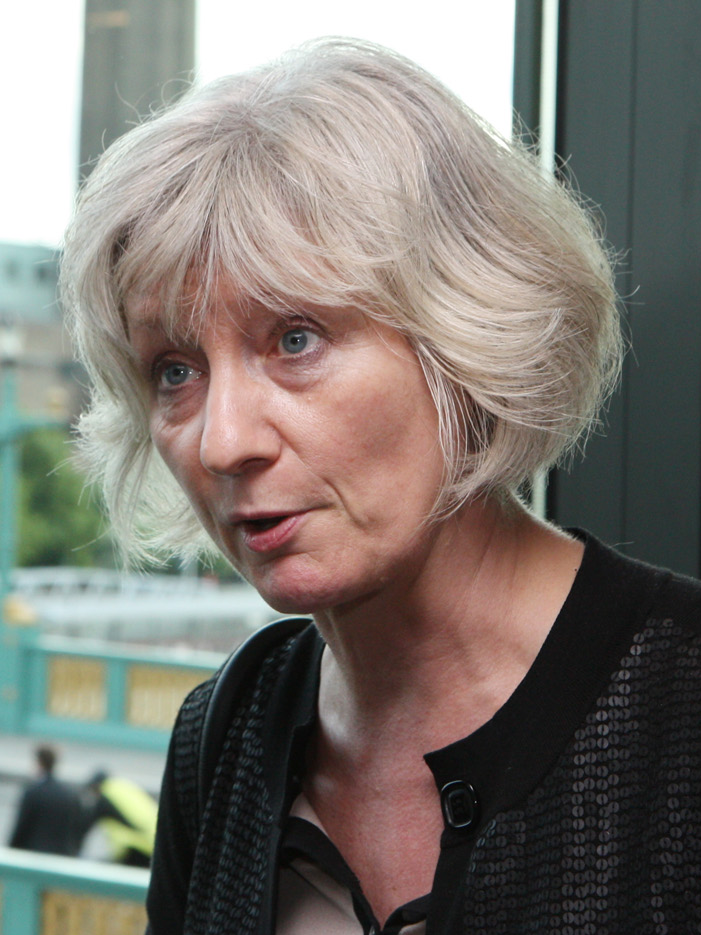
Shan Morgan in May 2011 (Foreign and Commonwealth Office)

Dame Shan Elizabeth Morgan DCMG (born 12 March 1955) is a former British civil servant. Formerly the Deputy Permanent Representative, UK Representation to the European Union, she was the Permanent Secretary to the Welsh Government until October 2021.

== Early life ==
Dame Shan Morgan was born in London, the daughter of Air Commodore Alun Morgan CBE and Yvonne Morgan nee Davies. She attended South Park Girls' High School (a girls' grammar school) in Lincoln, Wycombe High School (a girls' grammar school), and then the Royal Latin School, a coeducational grammar school in Buckingham.

Morgan studied French Literature and Language at the University of Kent, gaining a BA in 1977.

== Career ==
Morgan joined the Manpower Services Commission in 1977. In 1984 she worked at the European Commission in Brussels. In 1987 she returned to the UK, and became the Private Secretary to the Permanent Secretary at the Department of Employment. In 1991 she became a policy analyst in the National Training Task Force.

In 1992 Morgan became the Head of the Employment and Training Strategy Unit at the Government Office for London. In 1994 at the Department for Education and Employment, she was the UK's delegate to the International Labour Organization's governing body.

=== FCO ===
In 1997 Morgan became an attaché at the British Embassy in Paris. In 2001 she returned to Brussels, becoming Director for the European Union at the FCO in 2006.

=== Ambassador ===
It was announced that Morgan would become the Ambassador to Argentina on 5 September 2008, and she took up the post in October 2008. On 22 July 2009 she kissed hands with the Queen at Buckingham Palace, to officially become the Ambassador to the Argentine Republic and to the Republic of Paraguay (a combined post, based in Buenos Aires).

Her time in office coincided with sabre-rattling by President Cristina Fernández de Kirchner, who described the British as "an occupying colonial force in the Falkland Islands" in October 2010, when she complained to the UN about "militarisation of the South Atlantic". Britain has over 1,000 troops on the Falkland Islands, and four Eurofighter Typhoons (No. 1435 Flight RAF) at RAF Mount Pleasant. She left Argentina in May 2012.

From 2012 to 2016, Morgan was UK representative to the EU Council's Committee of the Deputy Representatives of the Member States (Coreper) in Brussels.

=== Permanent Secretary ===
On 9 November 2016 it was announced that Morgan had been appointed as the new Permanent Secretary for the Welsh Government. She assumed her post in February 2017. She retired from the role in October 2021.

== Honours ==
Morgan was appointed Companion of the Order of St Michael and St George (CMG) in the 2012 New Year Honours and Dame Commander of the Order of St Michael and St George (DCMG) in the 2017 Birthday Honours.

== See also ==
- Falkland Islands sovereignty dispute
- Argentina–United Kingdom relations

Diplomatic posts
Preceded by John Hughes	British Ambassador to Argentina; 2008–2012	Succeeded by John Freeman
