= Jon Shortridge =

British civil servant

Sir Jon Deacon Shortridge KCB (born 10 April 1947) is a British civil servant. He served as the Permanent Secretary of the Welsh Office in March 1999 and of the National Assembly for Wales on its creation in May 1999. He became Permanent Secretary of the Welsh Assembly Government on its establishment as a separate institution in May 2007, and left the post at the end of April 2008. In 2009, he was brought back as interim Permanent Secretary of the Department for Innovation, Universities and Skills.

== Early life and education ==
Shortridge was born in Chichester, Sussex, the son of Eric Creber Deacon Shortridge and Audrey Joan Hunt. He was educated at Chichester High School For Boys and has a degree (MA) in Philosophy, Politics and Economics from St Edmund Hall a college of Oxford University, and in Urban Design and Regional Planning (MSc) from the University of Edinburgh.

== Biography ==
He joined the Welsh Office in 1984. Between 1987 and 1988 he was Private Secretary to two Secretaries of State for Wales, Nicholas Edwards and Peter Walker. From 1988 to 1992 he was Head of the Welsh Office’s Finance Division. He undertook the Senior Management Review of the Welsh Office in 1995, and was appointed Director of Economic Affairs in 1997, with responsibility for establishing the National Assembly for Wales.

He was appointed a Knight Commander of the Order of the Bath (KCB) in the 2002 Birthday Honours.

In December 2002, Sir Jon was summoned by the Audit Committee of the National Assembly for Wales in order to be questioned over delays and rising costs surrounding the construction of a new debating chamber, which was to become the Senedd. £250,000 of taxpayers' money was spent on a legal dispute with sacked architects, the Richard Rogers Partnership. He stated during the hearing that the design submitted by the Richard Rogers Partnership would not have been eligible for the original competition if the true costs had been known.

== Personal life ==
Sir Jon married Diana Jean Gordon in 1972. They have a daughter, Clare (born 1975), and son, James (born 1978).

Government offices
Preceded by Rachel Lomax as PUS, Welsh Office	Permanent Secretary of the Welsh Assembly Government; 1999–2008	Succeeded by Dame Gillian Morgan
Preceded by Ian Watmore	Permanent Secretary of the Department for Innovation, Universities and Skills (interim); 2009–present	Incumbent
