= WWT Llanelli Wetlands Centre =

Nature reserve in South Wales

WWT Llanelli Wetland Centre
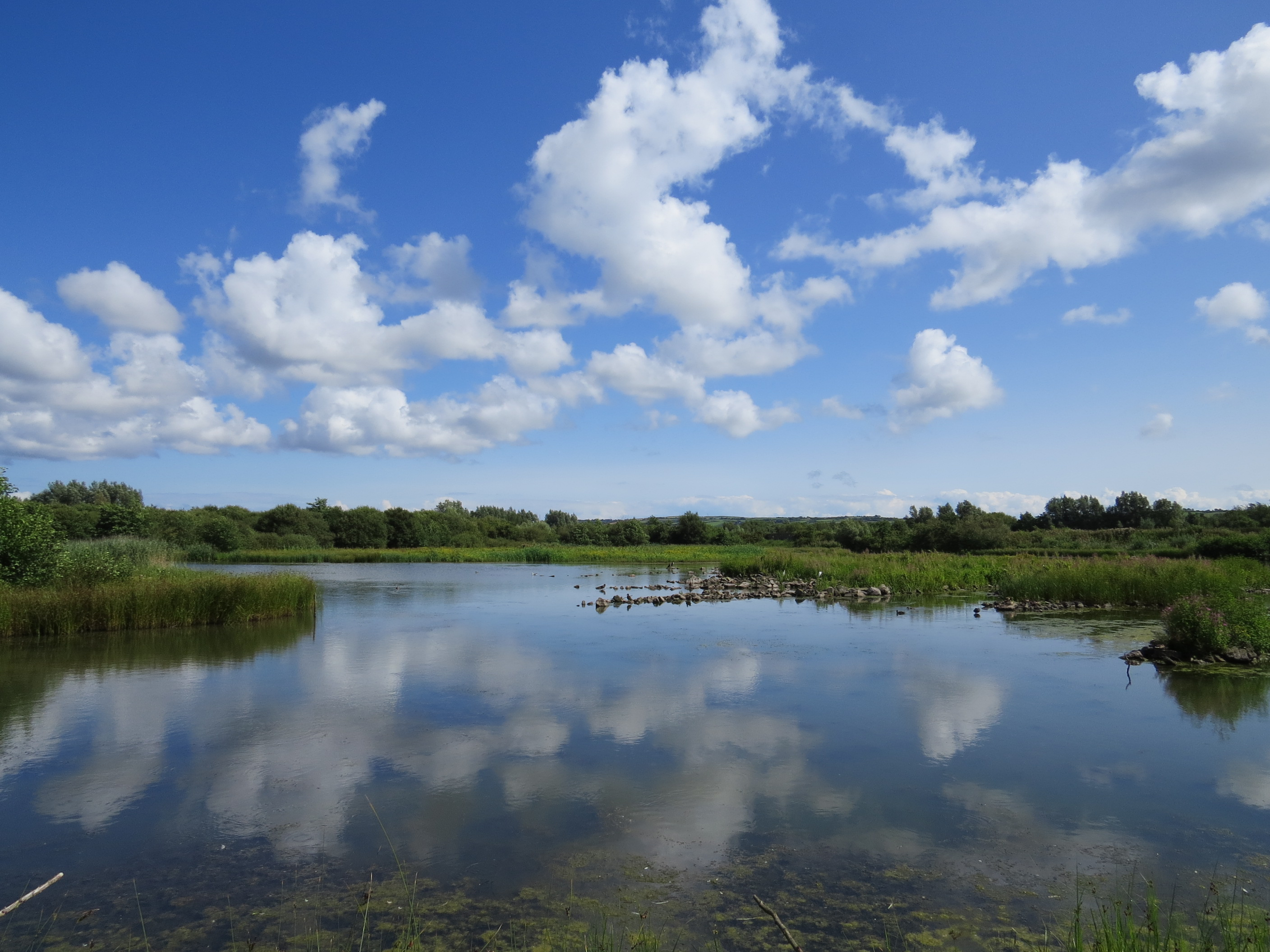
- View of lake and landscape
- Interactive map of WWT Llanelli Wetland Centre
- Coordinates: 51.665°N 4.125°W
- Visitors: 74,486 (in 2019)
- Website: www.wwt.org.uk/wetland-centres/llanelli/

WWT Llanelli Wetland Centre (Welsh: Canolfan Gwlyptir WWT Llanelli) is a wetland nature reserve at Llanelli, Carmarthenshire, Wales. It is one of ten reserves in the UK managed by the Wildfowl and Wetlands Trust, a nature conservation charity. The visitor centre has accessible toilets, a coffee shop and retail area. During school holidays, there are nature-based activities and events.

Common pochard at the Centre.

== Location ==
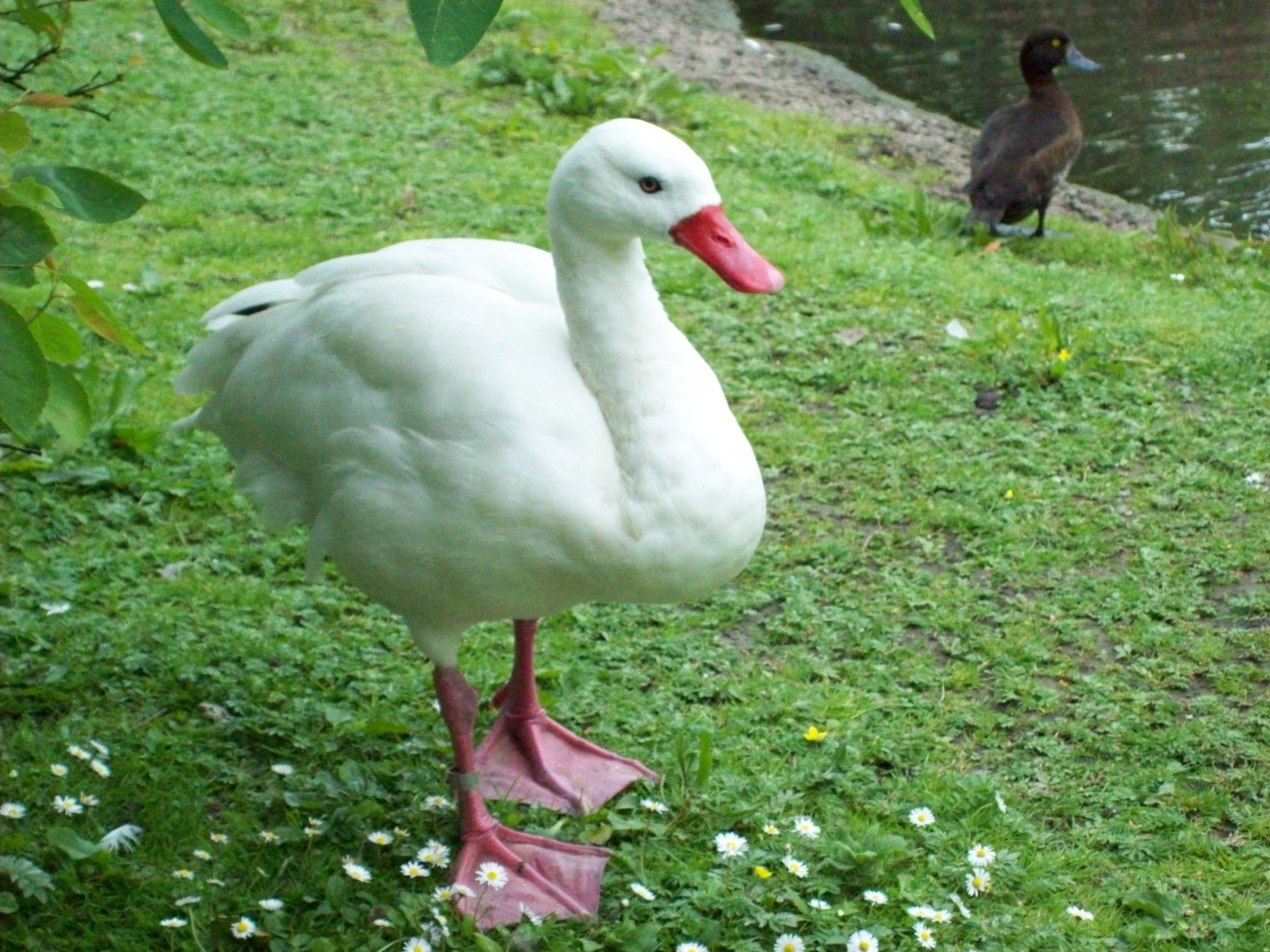
A coscoroba swan at the centre

The 500 acres (200 ha) reserve is situated 1 mile (1.6 km) east of Llanelli and 5 miles (8.0 km) north of Swansea in south Wales, on the eastern side of Carmarthen Bay. It is part of the Burry Inlet estuary which is an SSSI (Site of Special Scientific Interest), an SPA (Special Protection Area), and a Ramsar site.

With many ecologically important wetland habitats, the site is a vital refuge for some of the world's most endangered migratory birds, many of which are rare or endangered.

In autumn and winter, more than 60,000 birds return here to overwinter. Threatened species protected at the centre include little egret, lapwing, water vole, black-tailed godwit and many more.
