= Brycheiniog Tawe Nedd =

Senedd constituency (from 2026)

- County multi-member constituency for the Senedd
- Boundary of Brycheiniog Tawe Nedd in Wales
- Principal areas: Powys; Neath Port Talbot; Swansea
- Preserved county: Powys; West Glamorgan
- Population: 194,514 (2024)
- Major settlements: Brecon, Llandrindod Wells, Neath, Swansea (east), Ystradgynlais

Current County multi-member constituency
- Created: 2026
- Seats: 6
- Created from: UK Parliament boundaries: Brecon, Radnor and Cwm Tawe; Neath and Swansea East; Previous Senedd constituencies: Aberavon; Brecon and Radnorshire; Gower; Neath; Swansea East; Previous Senedd region: Mid and West Wales; South Wales West

Brycheiniog Tawe Nedd (Welsh for 'Brycheiniog, Tawe, [and] Neath';) is a six-member constituency of the Senedd (Welsh Parliament; Welsh: Senedd Cymru) used in the 2026 Senedd election. It covers southern Powys, the north of Neath Port Talbot, and eastern Swansea.

It was proposed following the 2026 review of Senedd constituencies, and is a pairing of the two UK Parliament constituencies of Brecon, Radnor and Cwm Tawe and Neath and Swansea East. It has a Welsh-only name.

== Boundaries ==
The constituency includes southern Powys, including Brecon, Llandrindod Wells, and Ystradgynlais. It also includes the north of Neath Port Talbot, including Neath, and the Swansea village of Clydach and the parts of the principal area east of the River Tawe, including St Thomas and Port Tennant.

A Senedd constituency comprising the boundaries of the UK Parliament constituencies of Brecon, Radnor and Cwm Tawe and Neath and Swansea East, has been proposed by the Democracy and Boundary Commission Cymru for the 2026 election to the Senedd (Welsh Parliament; Senedd Cymru). It was initially proposed using the English name Brecon, Radnor, Neath and Swansea East in September 2024, but was renamed to South Powys Tawe Neath and its Welsh name being De Powys Tawe Nedd, in December proposals, despite most other constituencies using Welsh-only names. It was later given the Welsh-only name Brycheiniog Tawe Nedd and its boundaries were confirmed in the commission's final recommendations in March 2025. When announcing their candidates, Reform UK used "Brecon, Radnor and Cwm Tawe, Neath and Swansea East" instead, using the English names for the pair of UK Parliament constituencies that form it.

The constituency was established in 2026, following the passing of the Senedd Cymru (Members and Elections) Act 2024. The act legislates electoral reform of the Senedd to create 16 larger "super constituencies", pairing the 32 UK Parliament constituencies in Wales, and using a new fully proportional voting system, with each constituency electing six Members of the Senedd (MSs) rather than one previously.

== Members of the Senedd ==
| Term | Election | Distribution | MS | MS | MS | MS | MS | MS |
|---|---|---|---|---|---|---|---|---|
| 7th | 2026 | 2 / 1 / 3 | James Evans (Ref) | Sioned Williams (PC) | Iain McIntosh (Ref) | Rebeca Phillips (PC) | Jane Dodds (Lib Dem) | David Mills (Ref) |

== Elections ==
=== Elections in the 2020s ===
2026 Senedd election: Brycheiniog Tawe Nedd
| Party | Candidate | Votes | % | ±% |
|---|---|---|---|---|
| Reform | James Evans (E) Iain McIntosh (E) David Mills (E) Stephanie Moira Charles Dewi Thomas Celfyn Furlong | 26,897 | 33.2 | ▲32.2 |
| Plaid Cymru | Sioned Williams (E) Beca Phillips (E) Andrew Jenkins Justin Horrell Kate Heneghan Chris Williams | 23,276 | 28.7 | ▲12.2 |
| Liberal Democrats | Jane Dodds (E) Jackie Charlton Phoebe Jenkins Will Lloyd Peter Chapman Dylan Calved | 9,549 | 11.8 | ▲1.2 |
| Labour | Mahaboob Basha Alex Sims Sarah Thomas Elliot Wigfall Cyriac George Chelsea Edwards Morgan Pritchard | 7,086 | 8.7 | ▼24.3 |
| Conservative | Tyler Chambers Elizabeth Hill-O'Shea Jane Lyons Matthew Gilbert Hannah Jarvis Amanda Davies | 6,281 | 8.4 | ▼16.6 |
| Green | Nathan Goldup-John Charlotte Ajomale-Evans Amerjit Rosie Kaur-Dhaliwal Eric Rosoman-Matthews Kathy Oakwood Imogen Elisabeth da Silva | 5,405 | 6.7 | ▲6.7 |
| Independent | Beverley Baynham | 586 | 0.7 | ▲0.6 |
| Welsh Christian | Jeff Green Sue Green | 456 | 0.6 | ▲0.6 |
| Independent | Dai Richards (Note: was a member of Restore Britain on registration of candidacy date. Also has previously been a member of Heritage Party, Advance UK and Reform UK) | 316 | 0.4 | ▲0.4 |
| Independent | Joe Hale | 225 | 0.3 | ▲0.3 |
| Heritage | Jennifer Roberts | 275 | 0.3 | ▲0.3 |
| Gwlad | Philip Owen | 204 | 0.3 | ▼0.3 |
| Majority | | | | |
| Turnout | | 81,096 | 52.9 | ▲4.2 |
| Registered electors | | 153,435 | | |

2021 notional result (Note: Estimate of the 2021 Senedd election result as if the revised boundaries recommended under the 2026 boundary review were in place)
| Party | Vote | % | Seats |
|---|---|---|---|
| Labour | 24,443 | 33.1 | 2 |
| Conservative | 19,190 | 26.0 | 2 |
| Plaid Cymru | 10,767 | 14.6 | 1 |
| Liberal Democrats | 9,939 | 13.5 | 1 |
| Independent | 2,944 | 4.0 | 0 |
| Green | 2,677 | 3.6 | 0 |
| Abolish | 2,234 | 3.0 | 0 |
| Reform UK | 717 | 1.0 | 0 |
| Propel | 436 | 0.6 | 0 |
| UKIP | 278 | 0.4 | 0 |
| Gwlad | 160 | 0.2 | 0 |
