= St Thomas Church, Swansea =

- St Thomas Church and Spire Cafe
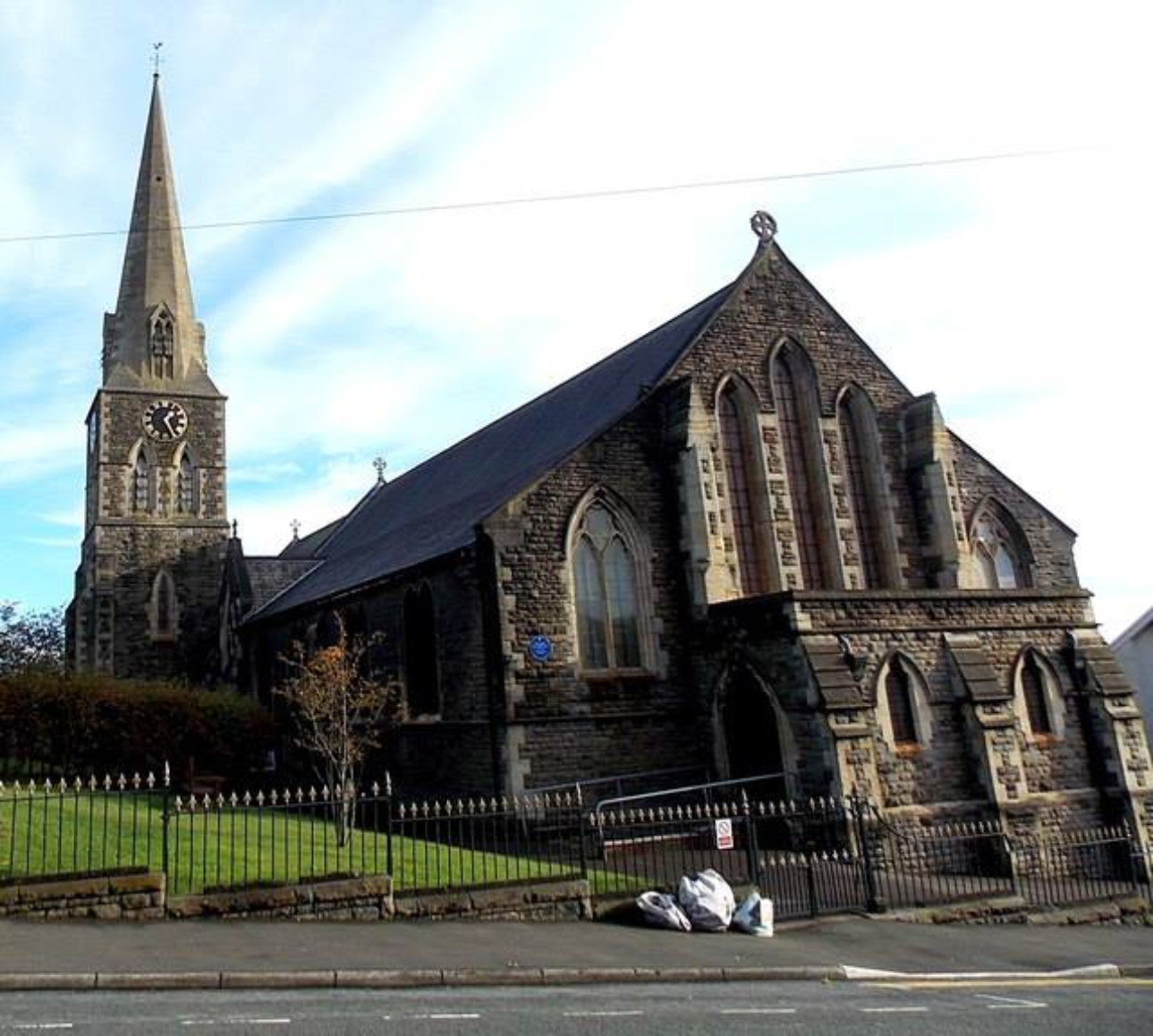
- St Thomas Church, Swansea

- Location in Swansea
- 51.622°N 3.928°W
- Location: Swansea
- Country: Wales
- Denomination: Church in Wales

History
- Status: 24/7 open parish church and food bank
- Founded: Late 19th century
- Dedication: Saint Thomas
- Dedicated: 1886-90

Architecture
- Functional status: Active
- Heritage designation: Grade II
- Designated: February 2004
- Architect: Grenfell family of Maesteg House
- Architectural type: Church
- Style: Early English style

Specifications
- Capacity: 300

Administration
- Province: Wales
- Diocese: Swansea and Brecon
- Deanery: Rev Steve L Bunting (Swansea St Thomas and Kilvey)
- Parish: Swansea St Thomas and Kilvey

St Thomas Church is a parish church in the St Thomas district of Swansea in Wales. It is a Grade II listed building and is the only church in Swansea to operate a 24/7 congregation and food bank.

== History ==
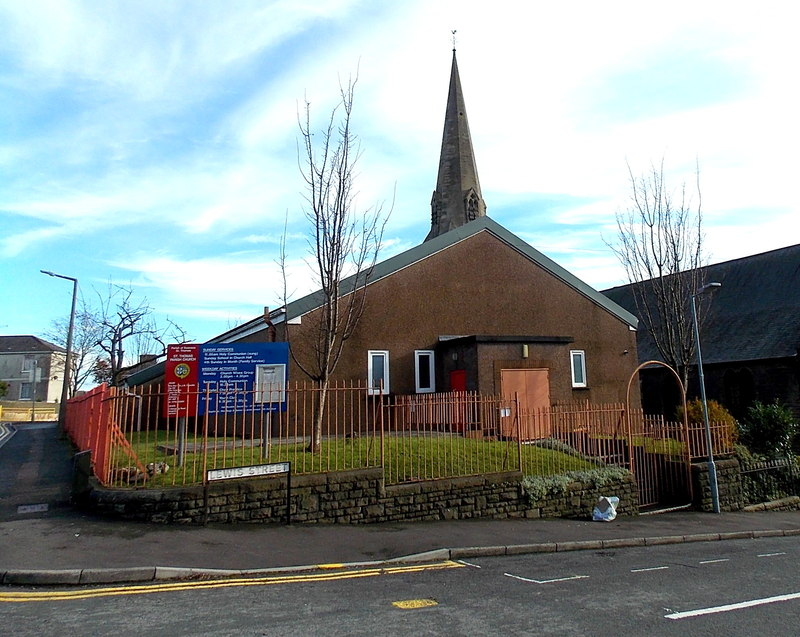
The church hall of St Thomas Church, also used as a food bank and a cafe called the "Spire Cafe".

The church was originally built in 1886-90 by the Grenfell family, who owned land in the area. It was designated a Grade II listed building in February 2004. Its spire, at 196 ft (60 m), makes it one of the tallest buildings in Swansea. The church remains an active parish church in the Diocese of Swansea and Brecon. In the 21st century it became the first in the area to establish a 24/7 congregation and foodbank.
