= Fabian's Bay =

Coordinates: 51.6190°N 3.9244°W

Fabian's Bay was a natural tidal basin near the present day area of Port Tennant in Swansea, Wales. The Prince of Wales dock, part of the Swansea Docks complex was built at the site of Fabian's Bay and the name Fabian's Bay is now no longer in use. Presumably, the nearby highway, the Fabian Way was named after Fabian's Bay.

== Sources ==
- Retired Section Swansea Docks: The Tennant Canal
