= At the Villa of Reduced Circumstances =

Novel by Alexander McCall Smith

- First ed. cover
- Author: Alexander McCall Smith
- Illustrator: Iain McIntosh
- Series: Professor Dr von Igelfeld
- Published: 2003
- Publisher: Polygon Books
- Publication place: Scotland

At the Villa of Reduced Circumstances is a novel by Scottish author and academic Alexander McCall Smith, relating further matters in the life of the main character, Professor Dr Moritz-Maria von Igelfeld.

== Plot ==
The Professor is a troubled German academic whose life's achievement is the (fictional) book Portuguese Irregular Verbs. The book relates details of von Igelfeld's troubled relationships with the other major characters of the book series, Professor Dr Dr (honoris causa) Florianus Prinzel and Professor Dr Detlev Amadeus Unterholzer, who work at the fictional Institute of Romance Philology at Regensburg, Germany.

The book consists of two longer stories. In the first story, On Being Light Blue, von Igelfeld's birthday wish leads him to a four-month stint at Cambridge University, where he is nonplussed by the eccentric English academics and their constant infighting. In the second story, The Villa of Reduced Circumstances, von Igelfeld unwittingly becomes embroiled in a military coup in Colombia after being invited there to receive an academic award.

== Book series ==
This is one book of a series:

- Portuguese Irregular Verbs (1997)
- The Finer Points of Sausage Dogs (2003)
- At the Villa of Reduced Circumstances (2003)
- Unusual Uses for Olive Oil (2011)
- Your Inner Hedgehog (2021)
- The Lost Language of Oysters (2025).
