= Maesteg House =

19th-century Welsh manor house

Coordinates: 51°37′28″N 3°55′43″W

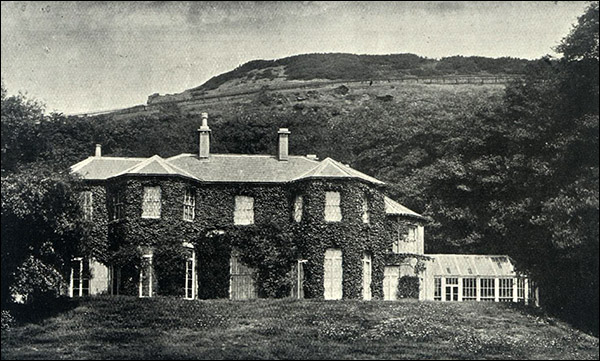
Maesteg House some time in the 1910s

Maesteg House was a manor house built on the south slope of Kilvey Hill, Swansea and from c1840 was the home of the copper industrialist Grenfell family. The building is no longer there, as it was demolished shortly after the First World War to make way for new housing development.

== Description ==
The house is described as being an irregularly shaped block 70ft wide by 60ft deep, with a hipped roof. On the front of the house there were two full-height bay windows with peaked slate roofs. A conservatory formed an extension of the eastern side.

There was a tree-lined avenue which was the entrance drive to the house.

The main lodge, with the stables, greenhouses, and Maesteg cottage, stood at what is now the junction of Morris Lane and Grenfell Park Lane. There was a second lodge near the junction of Kinley Street and Port Tennant Road.

== History ==
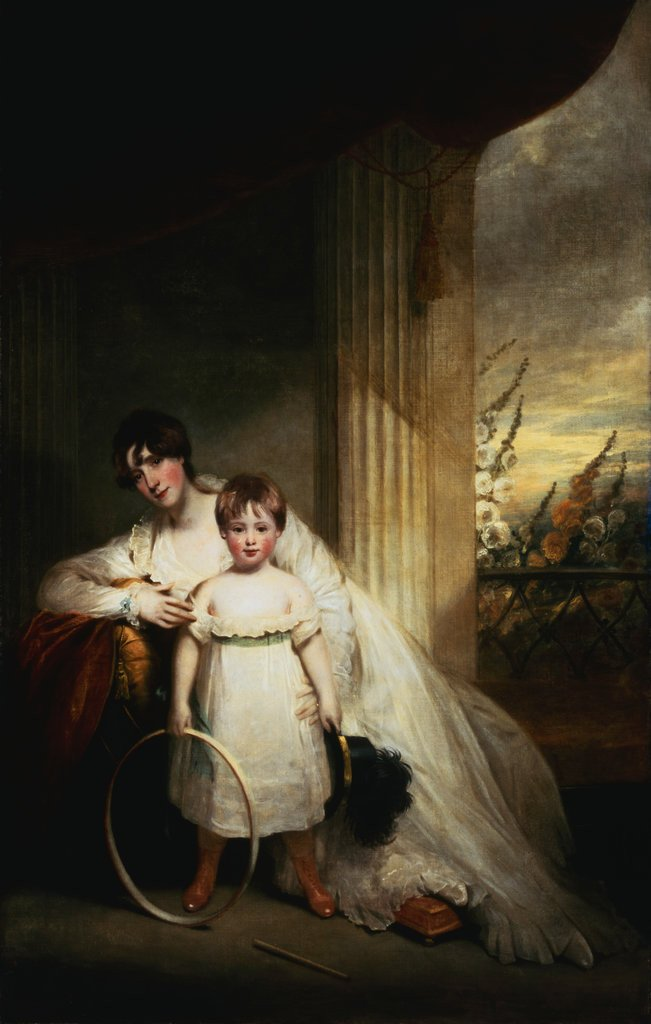
Portrait of Georgiana St Leger and her son Pascoe St Leger Grenfell

Riversdale Grenfell was the first of the Grenfell family to move into an existing property known as "Maesteg" (see local census documents 1841), followed c1845 by his older brother Pascoe St Leger Grenfell. Contrary to what has been written in many texts, there is no record of Pascoe St. Leger having Maesteg House built, and little evidence of him being in Swansea before 1845, although he does appear on the local census documents in 1851.

Pascoe St. Leger took over the copper and tin businesses in the lower Swansea valley from his father Pascoe Grenfell and his older half-brother Charles. The Grenfell family originated from Cornwall, and Pascoe St. Leger Grenfell spent time being educated in England and France, before moving to Swansea to take control of Pascoe Grenfell & Sons smelting business after the death of his father in 1838. After his first wife died in 1843, he married again in 1845, and he and his second wife Frances Madan brought up his nine children from his first marriage at Maesteg House. His youngest son Francis Wallace, often erroneously mentioned as born in Swansea, was born in Lambeth, London in 1841.

Maesteg House was notable for being the only house built by the Swansea industrialists that lay near the industrial workers and on the east side of the River Tawe, and thus breathing the same toxic air as their workers.

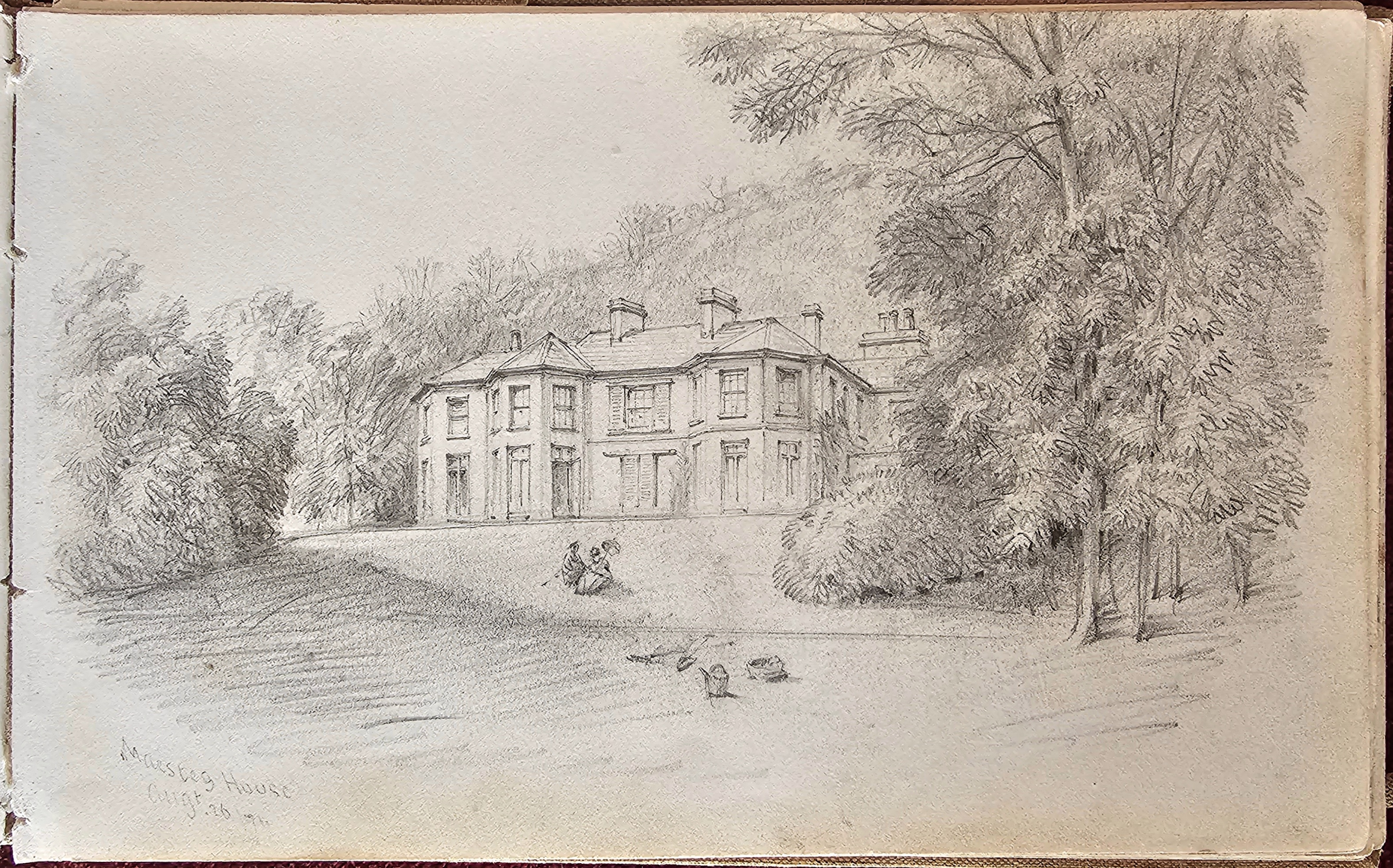
Maesteg House, Wales, 1874, pencil sketch by James Charles Harris

Pascoe Grenfell & Sons went into voluntary liquidation in 1892, and the business was bought by Messrs Williams, Foster & Co. for £40,000.

Elizabeth Mary Grenfell, one of Pascoe St Leger Grenfell's five daughters, lived at the house after the death of her father. She was involved in local philanthropy, aiding the welfare and religious development of the local community. During her time Maesteg House was sometimes used to help the community. Once a year the railway-men of the district were invited to the House where a large tent was erected on the grounds.

Grenfell's niece Katherine was the last of the Grenfells to live at Maesteg House. She used the house to run a school for local children. Kate Grenfell filed for bankruptcy in 1907, but with only seven years left on the Maesteg House leasehold to the Briton Ferry Estate, when put up for auction, there was no interest shown in the building.

During the First World War the house was used to house at least eighty Belgian refugees. By this point, the house had been uninhabited for some time and was in poor condition. To be able to house the refugees properly the house underwent repairs and maintenance over a period of two years and at a cost of £500 (about £41,000 in 2023 value).

Soon after the war, in about 1920, the house was demolished, and some of the estate was used to build new council housing immediately in front of the house. The Grenfell Park Estate and several local streets were named after the Grenfell family, who were regarded as benefactors to the Eastside of Swansea since Pascoe St. Leger Grenfell's arrival in the area.

== Location ==
The house was built on the southern slope of Kilvey Hill, facing southwards overlooking Fabian Bay. There are no traces left of the house but Grenfell Park Road follows the line of the drive of the house, with the house itself standing roughly above the junction of Grenfell Park Road and St Leger Crescent.
