= The Finer Points of Sausage Dogs =

2004 novel by Alexander McCall Smith

- First edition cover
- Author: Alexander McCall Smith
- Publisher: Polygon Books
- Preceded by: Portuguese Irregular Verbs (1997)
- Followed by: At the Villa of Reduced Circumstances (2003)

The Finer Points of Sausage Dogs is a novel by Scottish author and academic Alexander McCall Smith, with illustrations by Iain McIntosh. The book relates further matters in the life of the main character, Professor Dr Moritz-Maria von Igelfeld, following the first book of the series, Portuguese Irregular Verbs.

The Professor is a troubled German academic whose life's achievement is the (fictional) book Portuguese Irregular Verbs.

The book relates details of his troubled relationships with the other major characters of the book series, Professor Dr Dr (honoris causa) Florianus Prinzel and Professor Dr Detlev Amadeus Unterholzer, all at the fictional Institute of Romance Philology at Regensburg, Germany; and, especially, the outcomes of von Igelfeld's academic journey to the University of Arkansas while staying at Fayetteville, Arkansas.

The book has five chapters:

1. The Finer Points of Sausage Dogs
2. A Leg to Stand on
3. On the Couch
4. The Bones of Father Christmas
5. The Perfect Imperfect

The first story was first published in a limited edition of 400 copies in 1998.

== Book series ==
This is one book of a series:

- Portuguese Irregular Verbs (1997)
- The Finer Points of Sausage Dogs (2003)
- At the Villa of Reduced Circumstances (2003)
- Unusual Uses for Olive Oil (2011)
- Your Inner Hedgehog (2021)
- The Lost Language of Oysters (2025)
