= Jersey Marine =

Coordinates: 51.63022°N 3.8645°W

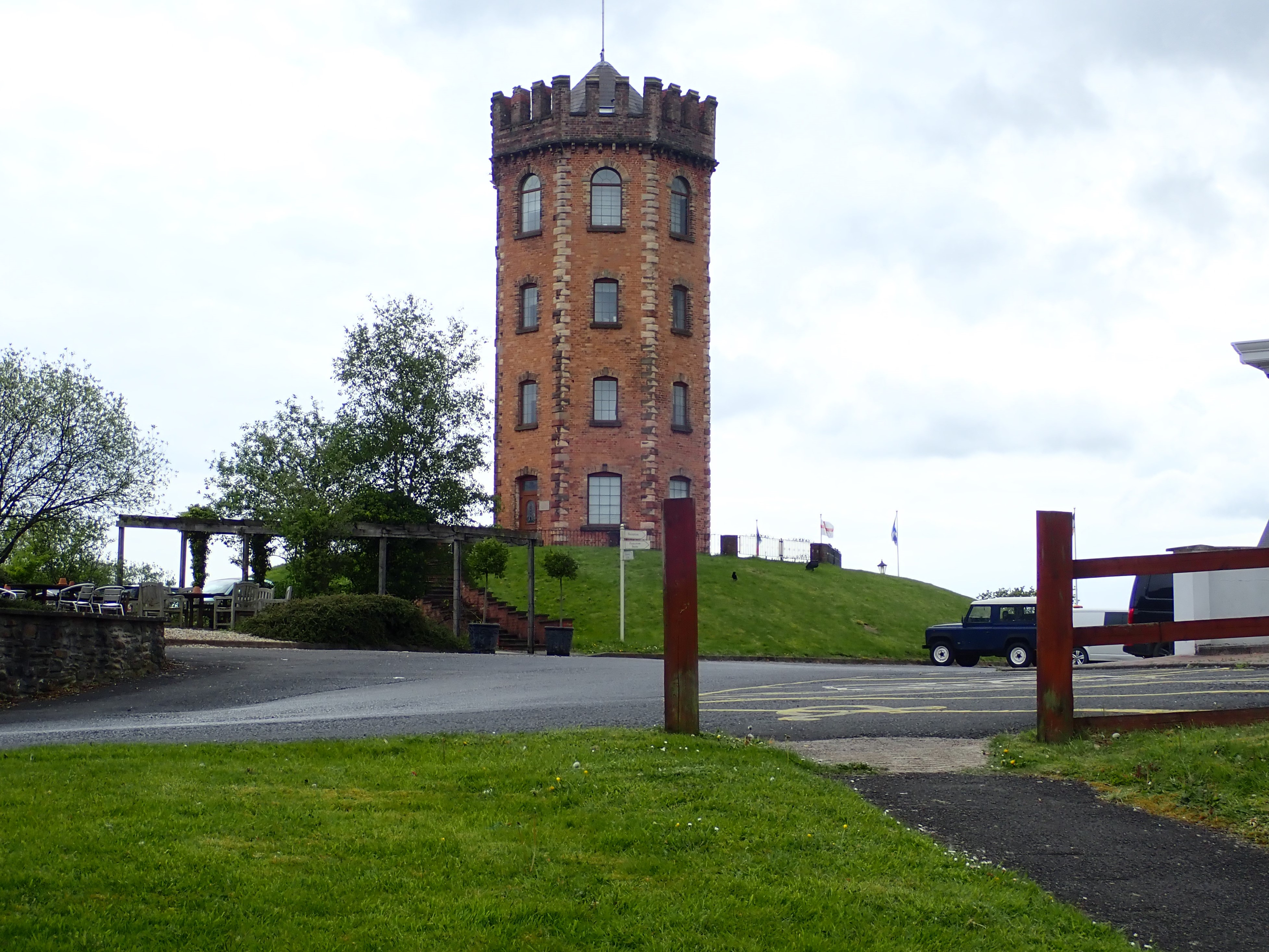
- Jersey Marine Tower

- Location within Neath Port Talbot
- OS grid reference: SS755895
- Principal area: Neath Port Talbot
- Preserved county: West Glamorgan
- Country: Wales
- Sovereign state: United Kingdom
- Post town: SWANSEA
- Postcode district: SA1
- Post town: NEATH
- Postcode district: SA10
- Dialling code: 01792
- Police: South Wales
- Fire: Mid and West Wales
- Ambulance: Welsh
- UK Parliament: Neath and Swansea East
- Senedd Cymru – Welsh Parliament: Aberavon

Jersey Marine is a village in Neath Port Talbot county borough, Wales, UK located about 3 miles (4.8 km) east of Swansea. It falls within the Coedffranc West ward.

Jersey Marine is centered on a main road formed by Ashleigh Terrace, coming from a junction with the A483 road (Fabian Way), which curves to the east along New Road leading to Llandarcy. The A483, Fabian Way, is normally considered the gateway into Swansea City Centre, therefore it is mistakenly thought that the area is part of the city of Swansea despite the village being part of Neath Port Talbot. The local primary school in the village is Crymlyn Primary School. Secondary school age children attend school in Neath, not Swansea.

The village includes the Pant y Sais Nature Reserve, a fen area featuring a circular boardwalk which connects with the tow path of the Tennant Canal.

A new 800,000 sq ft (74,000 m^{2}) distribution centre for Amazon.co.uk is sited south of the village on the site of a former cable manufacturing plant. It opened on 16 April 2008.

== Jersey Marine tower ==
Jersey Marine is most famous to locals for its tower. This is a four-storey octagonal tower that was built in the Victorian era. The tower was designed to provide a panoramic view of the surrounding area through its camera obscura. It was built as part of the development of Jersey Marine as a holiday resort. Having fallen into disrepair, there were proposals to restore the camera obscura but it was eventually fully restored in 2006 as part of The Towers Hotel and is now used as a bridal suite.

== Nearest places ==
- Crymlyn Burrows
- Crymlyn Bog
- Llandarcy
