= David Mills (Welsh politician) =

Welsh politician

David Mills MS
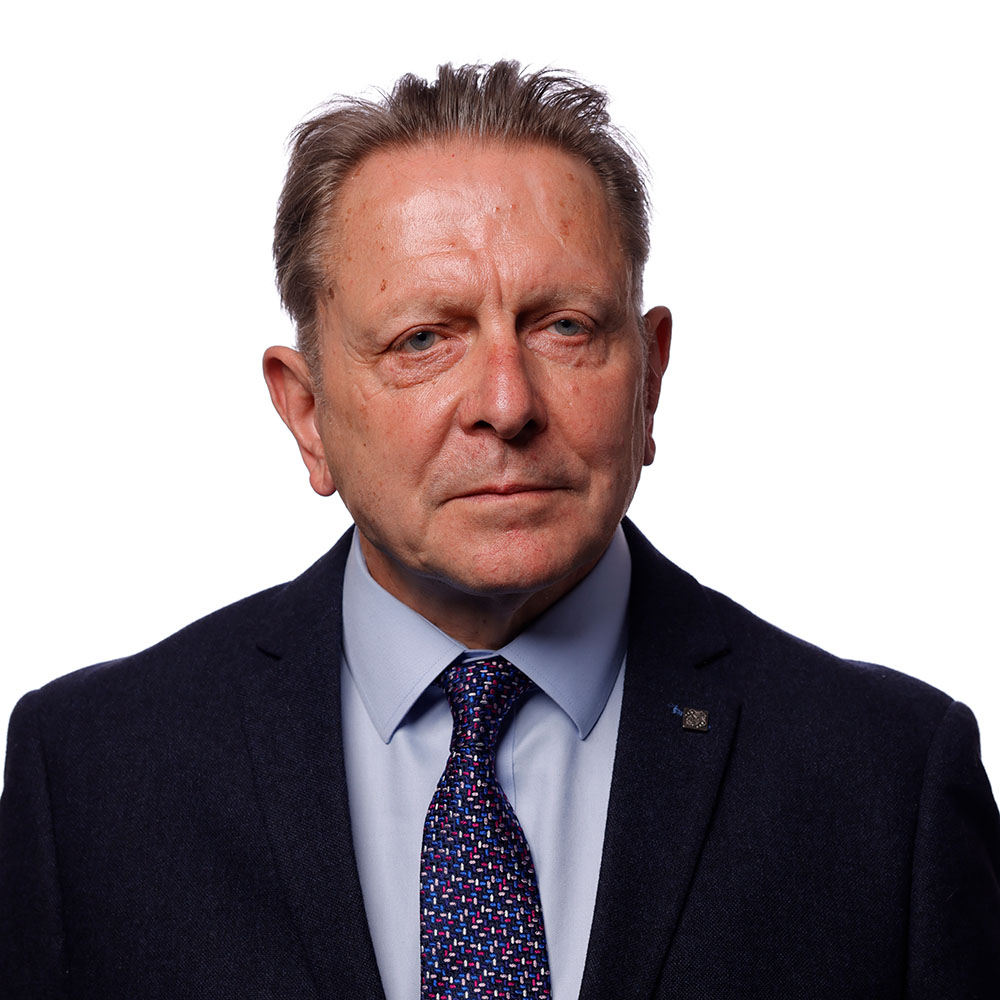
- Official portrait, 2026

Member of the Senedd
- Incumbent
- Assumed office 8 May 2026
- Constituency: Brycheiniog Tawe Nedd

Personal details
- Party: Reform UK
- Other political affiliations: Welsh Liberal Democrats

David Terence Mills is a Welsh Reform UK politician. He has served as a Member of the Senedd (MS) for Brycheiniog Tawe Nedd since 2026.

As of 2021, he was a farmer who ran a 156-acre farm in Lower Chapel, Powys.

== Political career ==
In the 2026 Senedd election, Mills was elected as a MS for the Brycheiniog Tawe Nedd constituency. Mills previously unsuccessfully stood as a Liberal Democrat candidate in the 1992 United Kingdom general election for the Bridgend constituency.

== See also ==
- 7th Senedd
