= Portuguese Irregular Verbs =

1997 novel by Alexander McCall Smith

- First edition
- Author: Alexander McCall Smith
- Illustrator: Iain McIntosh
- Language: English
- Series: Professor Dr von Igelfeld
- Genre: Comic novel
- Publisher: Maclean Dubois
- Publication date: 1997
- Publication place: Scotland
- Media type: Print
- Pages: 128
- ISBN: 0-9514470-4-1
- OCLC: 62223758
- Followed by: The Finer Points of Sausage Dogs

Portuguese Irregular Verbs is a short comic novel by Alexander McCall Smith, and the first of McCall Smith's series of novels featuring Professor Dr Moritz-Maria von Igelfeld. It was first published in 1997.

Von Igelfeld, a pompous German professor of Romance languages, works hard to write a tome on Portuguese irregular verbs, his claim to academic fame. He talks about it at conferences, usually attending with his two closest colleagues, professors Dr Dr Florianus Prinzel and Dr Detlev Amadeus Unterholzer. They encounter the world outside academia with entertaining clumsiness.

One review says the main character is "a gentle figure who deserves every cartoon anvil that falls on his head", in the humorous tradition of fictional characters Mr. Samuel Pickwick (in The Pickwick Papers by Charles Dickens), Bouvard and Pécuchet (in an unfinished work by Gustave Flaubert), and Mr Pooter of Diary of a Nobody. Another reviewer considers the book to be a series of connected short stories, "gentle farces", "where much is made of nothing – to great comic effect." That reviewer likens the stories to E. F. Benson's Mapp and Lucia books.

== Plot summary ==
Von Igelfeld feels that he is not accorded the scholarly recognition and veneration he deserves, though he has a good position as a philologist at the Institute of Romance Philology in Regensburg, Germany. He is plagued by envy and suspicion of his colleages, Prinzel and Unterholzer.

The book opens with the three professors attending a conference in Zürich, staying at a hotel out of town. Seeing a tennis court, they decide to play a game, getting equipment and an old book on the rules of tennis (written by a Cambridge graduate) from the hotel. After ten minutes of reading the book, they start the game, with two playing and the third as referee. None of them can serve, which sounded simple in the book. No-one can achieve the required number of sets to win. They give up playing, attributing their failure to have a winner to the Cambridge book, after providing excellent entertainment to others in the hotel with a view of the tennis courts.

Back when he was a student, von Igelfeld was at first interested in pursuing his doctoral studies in the old Irish language. He moves to Munich to work under an expert in Irish. They go on a field trip to Cork, where they are directed to an old Irish speaker, named Sean, who shouts at them until they leave. Von Igelfeld takes it down phonetically, and later learns that the vocabulary is all curse words. His landlady sees the page of Irish (translated into German) in his room and, thinking it is pornography, throws him out on the spot. He had already been considering irregular verbs as a topic of greater interest, so he parts from the unsupportive professor in Munich for the study of Romance languages at the university of Wiesbaden.

While at college, he commits his friend Prinzel to a duel, thinking him an athletic type of man. Prinzel is not athletic and rather upset. Duels are fashionable on the campus; von Igelfeld accepted the challenge from a group who are well practised at fencing. Prinzel loses the tip of his nose in the duel. The drunk surgeon who patches him up attaches the lost skin upside down. Von Igelfeld never again refers to his friend as an athlete.

Professor von Igelfeld's interest in, and extensive knowledge of, Romance languages take him abroad for conferences or vacations, where he finds adventure and mishap. He is invited to conferences because of the definitive book he researched and wrote, Portuguese Irregular Verbs, which sold about 200 copies to libraries, leaving several hundred of the original print run of this hefty tome.

Von Igelfeld sees a dentist for a troublesome tooth, deciding he will pursue her romantically. He gives Lisbetta, the dentist, a copy of his only book as a gift. She stands on the book to make it easier to care for her patients. He tells his colleague Unterholzer about this excellent new dentist. Unterholzer acts more quickly in courting Lisbetta, and the couple become engaged. Von Igelfeld endures the emotional challenge of attending their wedding.

He then takes a vacation to Venice in September with the Prinzels, where he learns that the Venetians are not fond of German tourists, as not enough of them have been visiting. Oddly, he chances upon a Geiger counter in their hotel. He finds no evidence of radiation on himself. When Florianus Prinzel tries the device, it reveals radioactivity on his shirt, where water had splashed on him in a gondola ride with his wife. Von Igelfeld shares the remarks made to him about a problem with the water in Venice, leading to a decline of German tourists in the summer. The courses of their meal were measured, leading them to send the fish course back to the kitchen. The three decide to end their stay in Venice early, so Prinzel can seek medical advice in Germany. Then young Tadeusz – a boy with a Polish family staying at the same hotel – walks past the measuring device, which reveals that he has a very high level of radiation. Von Igelfeld approaches the mother, speaking in French, telling her that her son has an issue with radioactivity. She replies politely, thanking him for the information, and indicating she has a theory about children and radioactivity, saying no more. Von Igelfeld receives a telegram from Unterholzer about an award from the Portuguese government. He is happy because he thinks the curtly worded telegram meant it was for himself. As they drive through Austria back home, Prinzel points out that Unterholzer probably meant the award was given to him, not to von Igelfeld. After a moment of sadness, he realizes this is not the end, and the three head back to Germany, "where they belong".

== Characters ==
- Moritz-Maria von Igelfeld: A tall German scholar of philology, who has specialized in Portuguese irregular verbs. He is about 35 years old in the last five chapters.
- Dr Dr (honoris causa) Florianus Prinzel: Colleague of von Igelfeld. Igelfeld thinks of him as the athlete-scholar, though he is not an athlete. Prinzel first met von Igelfeld at college. He marries Ophelia, and works at a language institute near her home town, keeping touch with von Igelfeld regularly. He received an honorary doctorate from a university at Palermo.
- Dr Detlev Amadeus Unterholzer: Colleague of von Igelfeld. Igelfeld scorns his family's social status, but never mentions this to Unterholzer.
- Professor Vogelsang: Professor who excels in old Irish, at Munich, and where von Igelfeld begins his doctoral studies. Vogelsang has no qualms in taking advantage of the work of his student, and offers no support when the foul language transcribed in Ireland leads to his student being tossed out of his lodgings.
- Patrick Fitzcarron O'Leary: Contact for the field trip to Cork, where von Igelfeld finds Ireland to be a very different place from Germany.
- Signora Margarita Cossi: Proprietor of an inn in Montalcino rural Tuscany who is an "incorrigible xenophobe", an unfortunate characteristic in her profession.
- Professor J. G. K. L. Singh: Indian professor of philology who invites von Igelfeld to present at a conference in Goa. Prof. Singh is injured in a train accident, and does not reach the conference.
- The holy man: Guru whom von Igelfeld meets in Goa. The man tells him of something bad happening to a friend connected to Goa, and that a plot against him is happening at his home. Both events happen: Professor Singh's injuries, and the plot by Unterholzer and Prinzel to have the book Portuguese Irregular Verbs taken off the shelves in the library of his institute, which he stops by leaving the conference in Goa early.
- Doctor Lisbetta von Brauthein: Dentist who fixed von Igelfeld's painful tooth, then married Unterholzer, who pursued her while von Igelfeld loved her but did not act.

== Title ==
The book's title refers eponymously to von Igelfeld's magnum opus, a tome of nearly 1200 pages, which sells poorly. This is his academic specialty.

== Reviews ==
Kirkus Reviews notes the antihero "as predictable in his habits and as impervious to the outside world as Kant", following a tradition.

Dawn Drzal reviewed the first three books, in the New York Times Sunday Book Review, after they were issued in the US. She likened the stories to E. F. Benson's Lucia books. Drzal says the first book is a collection of short stories, not a short novel as labelled in the US. The stories are "gentle farces", creating a place "where much is made of nothing – to great comic effect. The humor plays "many variations on von Igelfeld's unshakable belief in German superiority."

At the release of the audiobook, Library Journal Review referred to the book as "these sequential collections of stories". The "comic vignettes based on the classic form of minutiae inflated to monstrous proportions," but the reviewer expects these stories are not as charming as those in the series set in Gaborone.

Sarah Weinman reviewed the book when the first three books were published in the UK in one volume, The 2 1/2 Pillars of Wisdom. She remarked that "the stories that make up the von Igelfeld trilogy are rooted in McCall Smith's own career in academia as a professor of medical law." She credits the success of the novel to the author's "charming, gentle voice" which is "always clear and present, brimming with intelligence and humour and rooted in curiosity, one that elevates even the most innocuous interactions to both high comedy and art."

== Development of the novel ==
Drzal said "the book began as a private joke with a very distinguished real-life German professor, McCall Smith's friend Reinhard Dr. Dr. Dr. Zimmermann. (His official title: German academics line up all their doctorates.)" Zimmerman bought half of the print run of 500 books, and slowly it built a cult following ("a kind of samizdat"), which increased with each successive novel of the three.

== Publication history ==
The book was published in the UK in 1996 with a run of 500 copies. The first three books were published in the US in 2004, following the wildly popular success of McCall Smith's other series, The No. 1 Ladies' Detective Agency, which "shower[ed] the globe with four million copies in English alone."

McCall Smith followed Portuguese Irregular Verbs with two sequels: The Finer Points of Sausage Dogs and At the Villa of Reduced Circumstances, both published in 2003. In 2004, Abacus (an imprint of Little, Brown and Company) republished all three novels in a paperback omnibus titled The 2½ Pillars of Wisdom. A fourth volume in the series, Unusual Uses for Olive Oil, was published in 2011, followed by a fifth, Your Inner Hedgehog in 2021, and a sixth, The Lost Language of Oysters in 2025.
