= Kilvey Community Woodland =

Nature reserve in Swansea, Wales

Coordinates: 51.633°N 3.922°W

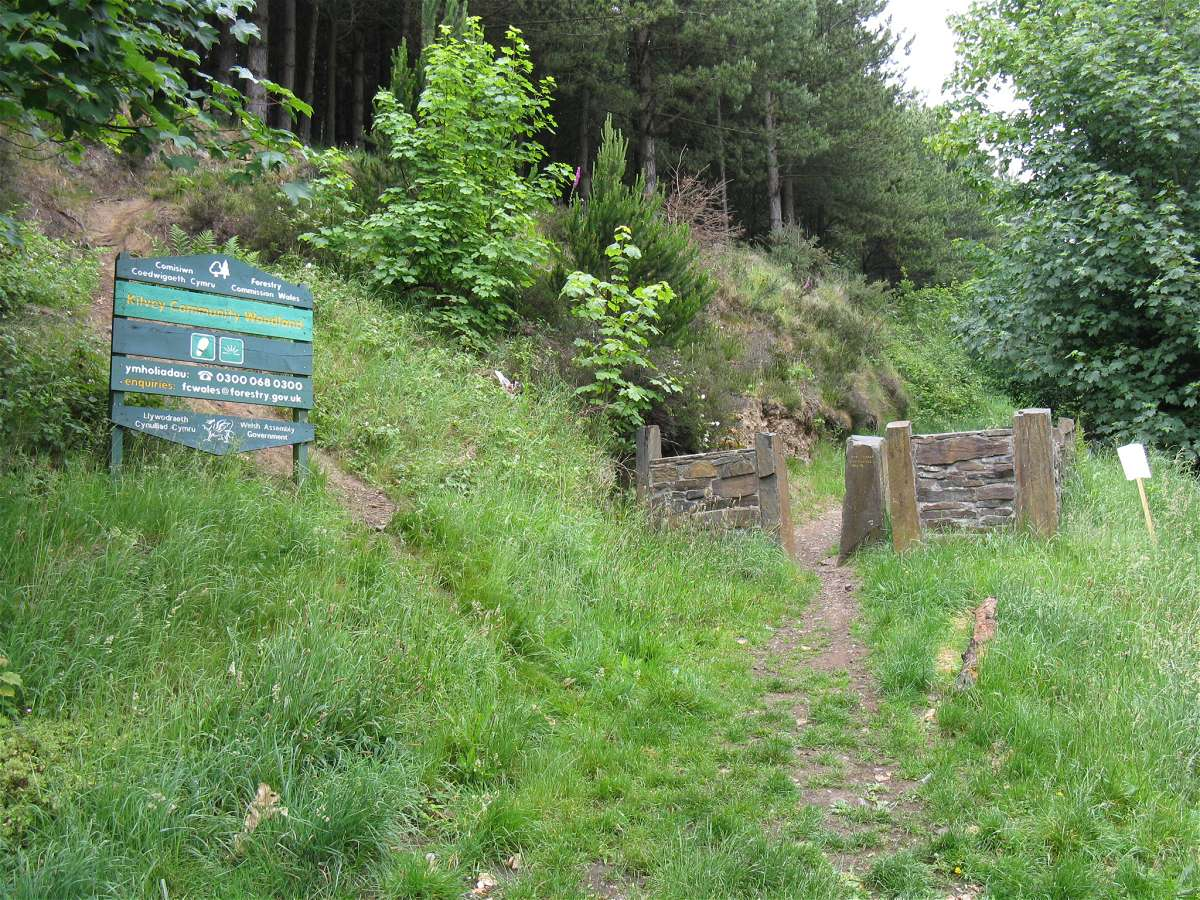
Entrance to the Kilvey Community Woodland

The Kilvey Community Woodland is a designated nature reserve located on the fringes of the city of Swansea, Wales. The area covers the slopes of Kilvey Hill and some of the flatter land to the northwest.

== Geography ==
Kilvey Community Woodland is a three-square-kilometre (1.2 sq mi) area of woodland located around one kilometre (0.62 mi) from Swansea docks via the A4217. Crymlyn Bog nature reserve is located a short distance to the east of the woodland. The Kilvey Woodland area is regarded as an "urban fringe" woodland due to its close proximity to built up areas and is one of the largest of its kind in the Swansea area. The park is managed by the Forestry Commission, the local council and a local volunteer group, the Kilvey Hill Community Woodland Volunteers, established in the 1990s to help maintain and promote the area. Swansea Council describes the area as "a refuge for wildlife in the city" with the site featuring areas of woodland, heathland, wetland and meadow.

The woodland features a Community Sculpture Trail, featuring eight pieces of art made by volunteers and members of the local community.

== History ==
Prior to the start of the industrial revolution, the area was used farmland to grow corn. In the 17th century, Bussy Mansell built a watermill nearby to process the grain being produced in the area.

The area around the woodland was previously part of Swansea's industrial heartland, known for its production of tin, copper, zinc and other metals. The copper produced left the soil in the local area contaminated and unsuitable for the majority of the local trees. The nearby corn fields were ruined and the surrounding area was left largely empty of plant and wildlife for several decades, being described as "barren as the road". Local farmers took John Henry Vivian, master of the copper works, to court over the death of livestock but were unsuccessful.

In the 1960s a redevelopment programme was initiated that included the creation of nature trails and replanting, but support for the project faded. By the 1980s, the area had gained a reputation for anti-social behaviour. Fir trees were planted in the woodland due to their resistance to the chemicals left in the ground and, in recent years, locals have begun attempts to reintroduce native plant life to the area.
