= Rebeca Phillips =

Welsh politician

Rebeca Phillips MS
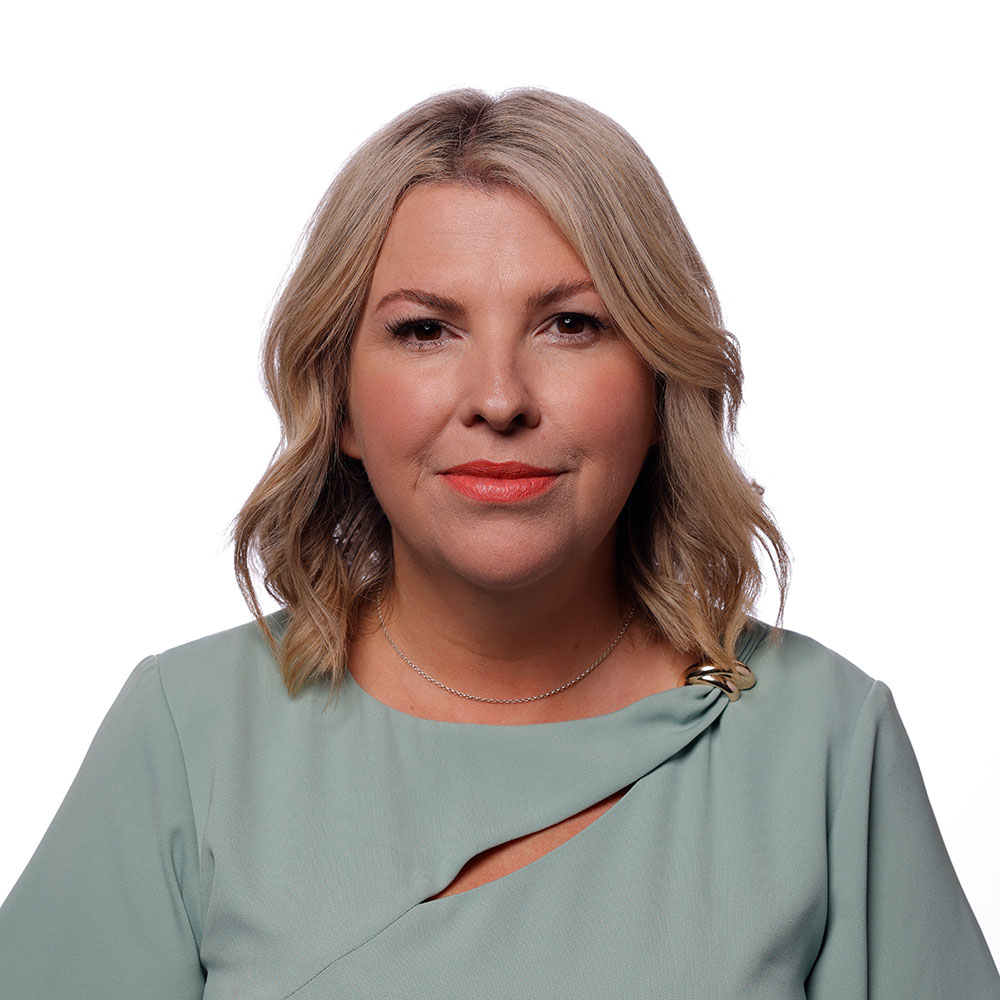
- Official portrait, 2026

Member of the Senedd
- Incumbent
- Assumed office 8 May 2026
- Constituency: Brycheiniog Tawe Nedd

Personal details
- Party: Plaid Cymru

Rebeca Phillips is a Welsh Plaid Cymru politician who has been a Member of the Senedd (MS) for Brycheiniog Tawe Nedd since 2026.

== Biography ==
Phillips represented the Trebanos ward on Neath Port Talbot County Borough Council between 2012 and 2026. She also worked for Jonathan Edwards and Adam Price, and subsequently for Menter Iaith Castell-nedd Port Talbot. She has two children.

In the 2026 Senedd election, Phillips was elected as a MS for Brycheiniog Tawe Nedd.
