= St Thomas, Swansea =

Coordinates: 51.62905°N 3.92293°W

St Thomas
- Community
- Principal area: Swansea
- Country: Wales
- Sovereign state: United Kingdom
- Police: South Wales
- Fire: Mid and West Wales
- Ambulance: Welsh
- List of places UK Wales Swansea Map of the community

St Thomas is a suburban district and community in Swansea, Wales. It is a mainly residential area which lies east of Swansea city centre across the River Tawe and falls within the St Thomas ward. Fabian Way divides the traditional residential area from Swansea Docks, which has been developed during the 2010s to create a new area of commercial activities and apartments.

At the 2011 UK Census the community had a population of 7,187. It includes the area of Port Tennant.

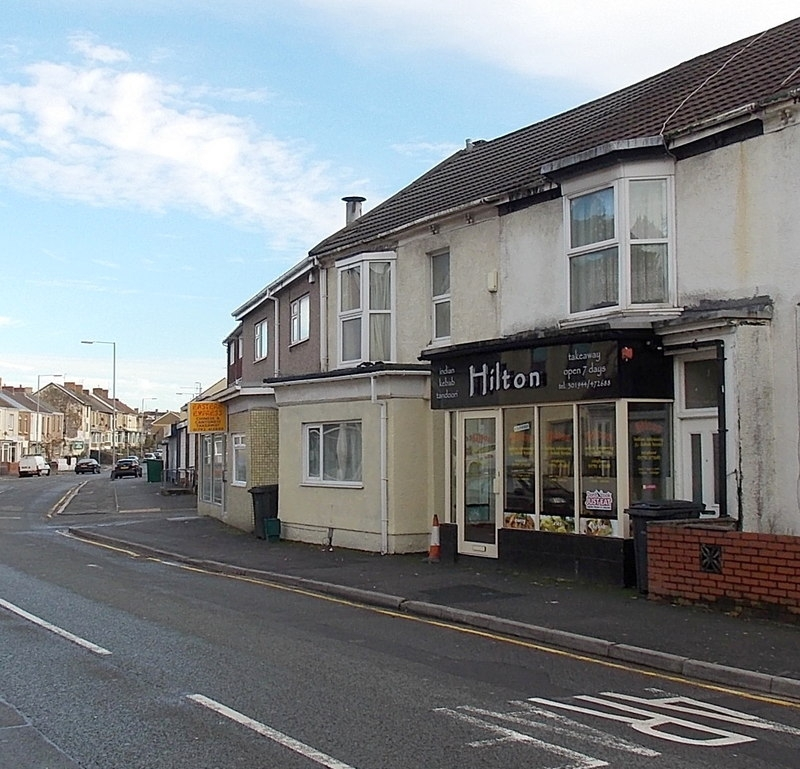
Port Tennant Road, St Thomas

Local amenities in the area include the recently built St Thomas Community Primary school which also incorporates the old Margaret Street Nursery school, Community Centre and local library. St. Thomas is a traditional working class area with a core of 2-3 bedroom mid-Victorian terraces built to accommodate the local dock and industrial workers. Post-war council housing was constructed in the mid twentieth century.

On the east bank of the River Tawe in St Thomas, there is a grassy recreational area that includes a footpath and cycle track (part of NCR 43). The area is used for recreation purposes by the local population and there are proposals to re-develop the area with new housing. This proposal has met with some opposition from residents on Kilvey Hill.

Neighboring areas are Kilvey Community Woodland and Port Tennant.

The area is the birthplace of educator Flora Forster and singer Harry Secombe.
