= Kilvey Hill =

Hill in Swansea, Wales

Coordinates: 51°37′45″N 3°55′13″W

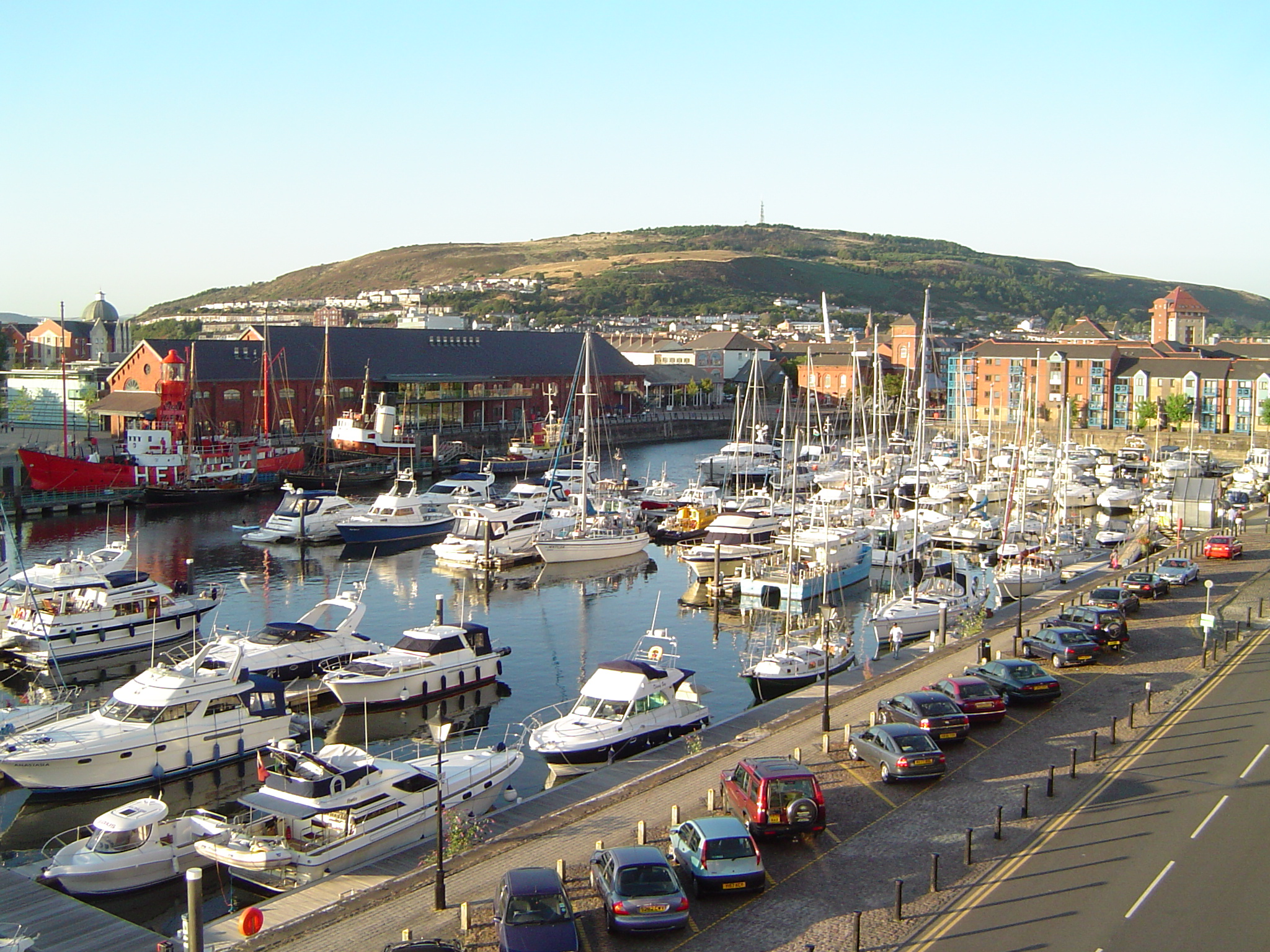
Shot from Trawler Road in the Maritime Quarter with Kilvey Hill in the background

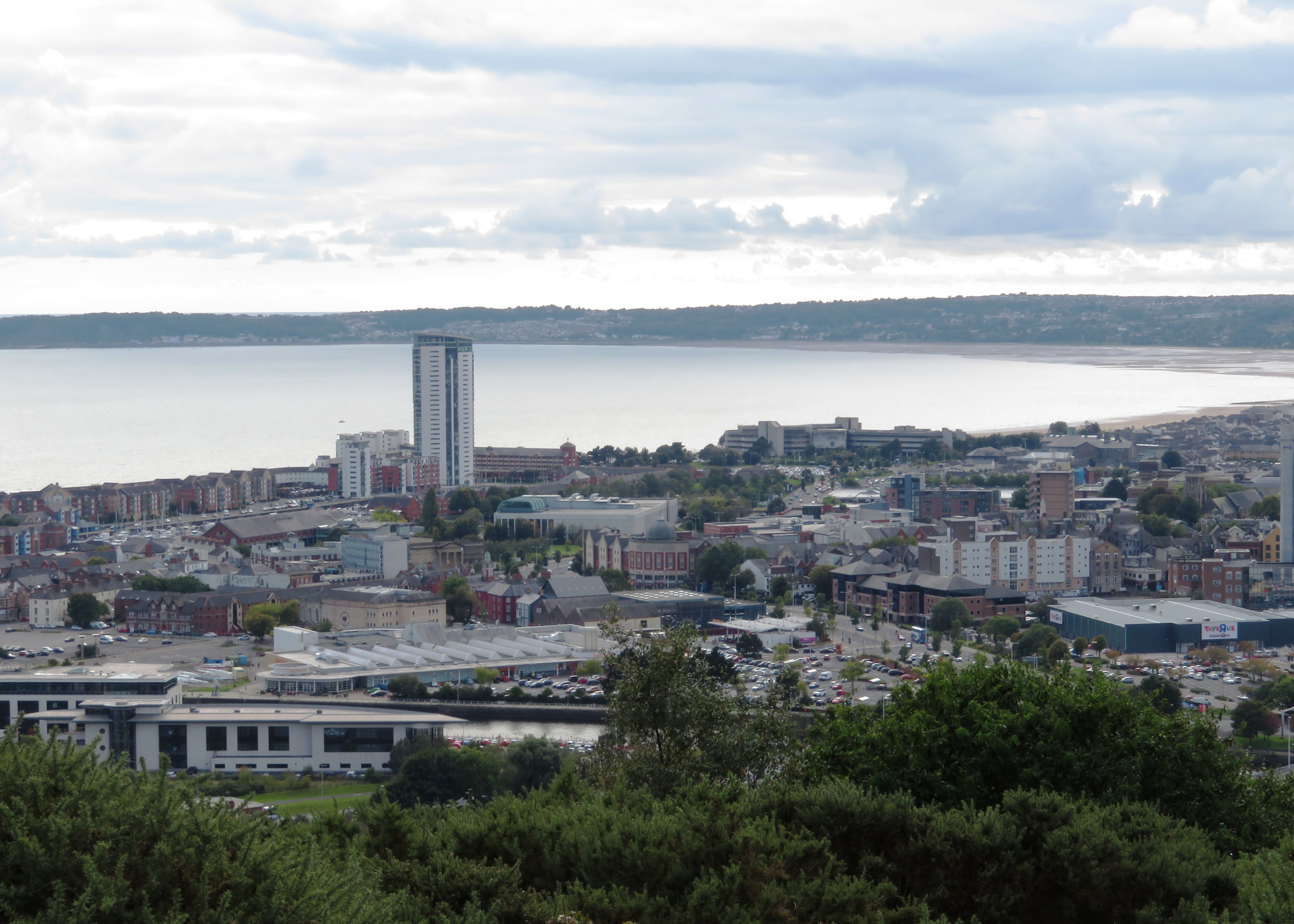
The Tower, viewed from Kilvey Hill

Kilvey Hill is a hill in the St. Thomas area of Swansea. It is 193 metres (633 ft) high and is classed as a Sub Marilyn. From the top of Kilvey Hill there are panoramic views of Swansea city centre, Swansea Docks, Swansea Bay and the Lower Swansea Valley. The historic Welsh name of the hill is Y Bigwrn, with its summit known as Pen y Bigwrn. Currently, however, it is generally known as Mynydd Cilfái.

There are a number of residential areas dotted around the base of the hill. To the north are Bon-y-maen and Pentrechwyth. To the south are Dan-y-graig, Port Tennant and St. Thomas. At the top of the hill is the TV and radio transmitter station and a telecommunications mast. The central belt of the hill consists of woodland and open grassland, which forms part of the Kilvey Community Woodland. The hill is used to host a number of mountain biking events.

Access to the top of the hill by motor vehicles is only via a steep concrete road that leads up to the summit from the village of Bon-y-maen.

== Kilvey Killer ==
The Kilvey Killer is an annual charity endurance race, usually held in August, which involves running up and down Kilvey Hill carrying a sack of cement. The race was established in 1989 by the former amateur boxing champion and trainer Nigel Page to raise money for a special baby unit for Singleton Hospital, Swansea, which had saved his daughter Kirsty's life after she was born prematurely.

== Dispute over development ==
In the 2020s, controversy erupted over a plan by Syline Developments to build an 'adventure attraction' which it was claimed would change the nature of the area.
