= Swansea docks =

Dock in Swansea, Wales, UK

Coordinates: 51.616°N 3.918°W

Swansea Docks is the collective name for several docks in Swansea, Wales, which are immediately south-east of Swansea city centre. In the mid-19th century, the port was exporting 60% of the world's copper from factories situated in the Tawe Valley. The working docks area today is owned and operated by Associated British Ports as the Port of Swansea, and the northern part around the Prince of Wales Dock is undergoing re-development into a new urban area branded as the SA1 Swansea Waterfront.

== Docks ==
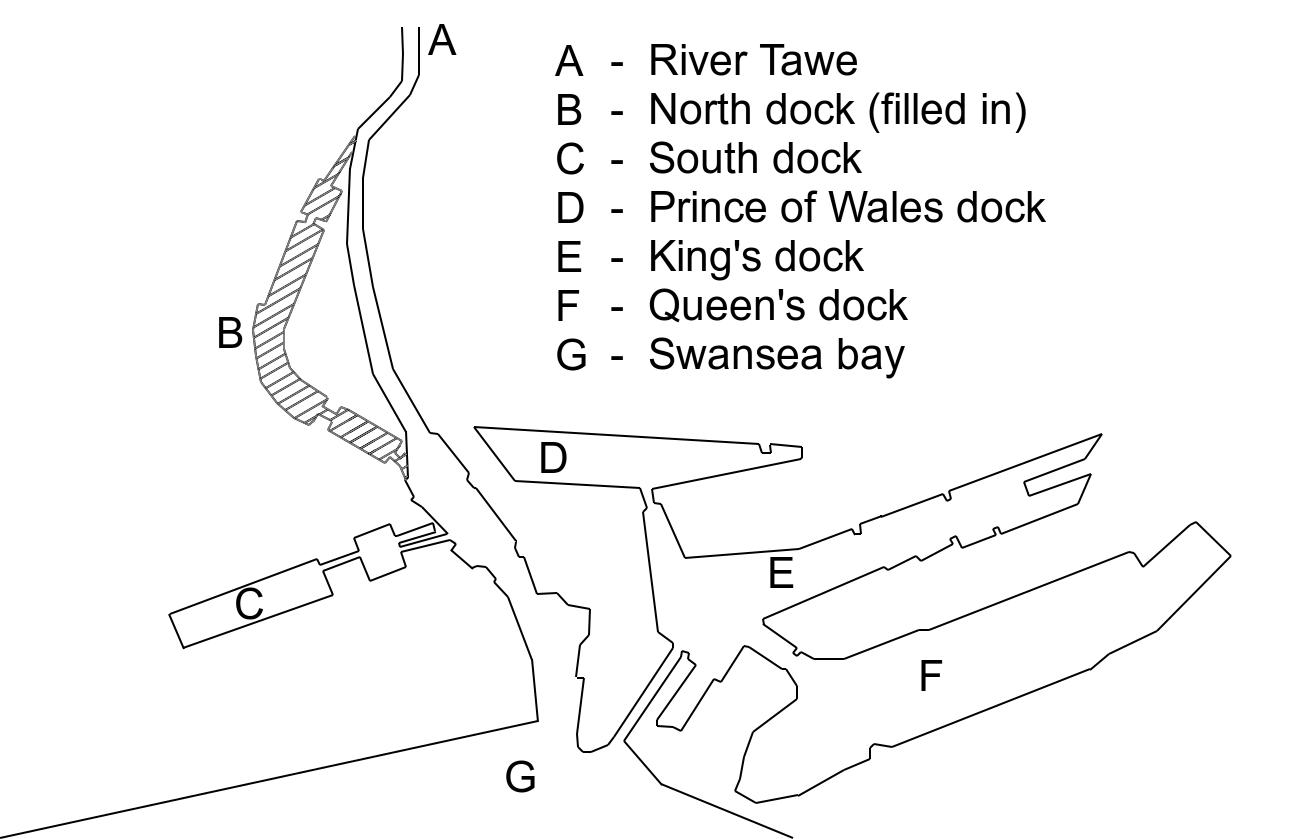
Schematic of the past and current docks of Swansea

Docks which have existed or still exist in the complex include:

Swansea Harbour Act 1791 (Note: Section 27 of the Swansea Harbour Amendment Act 1847 (10 & 11 Vict. c. cclx).)
- Act of Parliament
- Parliament of Great Britain
- Long title: An Act for repairing, enlarging, and preserving the Harbour of Swansea, in the County of Glamorgan.
- Citation: 31 Geo. 3. c. 83
- Territorial extent: Great Britain

Dates
- Royal assent: 6 June 1791
- Commencement: 10 August 1790 (Note: Start of session.)
- Repealed: 28 July 1836
Other legislation
Amended by	Swansea Harbour Act 1796; Swansea Harbour Amendment Act 1804
Repealed by	Swansea Harbour Act 1836
Relates to	Swansea Harbour Amendment Act 1847

Status: Repealed

Text of statute as originally enacted

Swansea Harbour Act 1796
- Act of Parliament
- Parliament of Great Britain
- Long title: An act to amend and render more effectual an act, made in the thirty-first year of his present Majesty, for repairing, enlarging, and preserving the harbour of Swansea, in the county of Glamorgan and for making improvements in the lights at the Mumbles.
- Citation: 36 Geo. 3. c. 93
- Territorial extent: Great Britain

Dates
- Royal assent: 14 May 1796
- Commencement: 14 May 1795 (Note: The Acts of Parliament (Commencement) Act 1793.)
- Repealed: 28 July 1836
Other legislation
Amends	Swansea Harbour Act 1791
Amended by	Swansea Harbour Amendment Act 1804
Repealed by	Swansea Harbour Act 1836

Status: Repealed

Text of statute as originally enacted

Swansea Harbour Amendment Act 1804
- Act of Parliament
- Parliament of the United Kingdom
- Long title: An Act for amending and enlarging the Powers of Two Acts, passed for preserving the Harbour of Swansea in the County of Glamorgan, and for further improving the same.
- Citation: 44 Geo. 3. c. lvi
- Territorial extent: United Kingdom

Dates
- Royal assent: 29 June 1804
- Commencement: 29 June 1804
- Repealed: 1 September 1854
Other legislation
Amends	Swansea Harbour Act 1791; Swansea Harbour Act 1796
Amended by	Swansea Harbour Act 1836
Repealed by	Swansea Harbour Act 1854

Status: Repealed

Text of statute as originally enacted

Swansea Harbour Act 1836
- Act of Parliament
- Parliament of the United Kingdom
- Long title: An Act to alter and amend several Acts for the Improvement of the Harbour of Swansea in the County of Glamorgan, and for further improving the said Harbour.
- Citation: 6 & 7 Will. 4. c. cxxvi
- Territorial extent: United Kingdom

Dates
- Royal assent: 28 July 1836
- Commencement: 28 July 1836
- Repealed: 1 September 1854
Other legislation
Amends	Swansea Harbour Amendment Act 1804
Repeals/revokes	Swansea Harbour Act 1791; Swansea Harbour Act 1796
Amended by	Swansea Harbour Acts Amendment Act 1844; Swansea Harbour Amendment Act 1847
Repealed by	Swansea Harbour Act 1854

Status: Repealed

Text of statute as originally enacted

Swansea Harbour Acts Amendment Act 1844
- Act of Parliament
- Parliament of the United Kingdom
- Long title: An Act to amend an Act for altering and amending several Acts for the Improvement of the Harbour of Swansea in the County of Glamorgan.
- Citation: 7 & 8 Vict. c. xliv
- Territorial extent: United Kingdom

Dates
- Royal assent: 4 July 1844
- Commencement: 4 July 1944
- Repealed: 1 September 1854
Other legislation
Amends	Swansea Harbour Amendment Act 1804; Swansea Harbour Act 1836
Amended by	Swansea Harbour Amendment Act 1847
Repealed by	Swansea Harbour Act 1854

Status: Repealed

=== North Dock ===
The North Dock was created to fulfil the increasing shipping demands from the nearby metals industry, and was created by diverting the River Tawe by cutting a new direct course within a meander section near the estuary. The old course of the river became the new dock and work was completed in 1852. Secluded and poorly lit, the area around North Dock was popular with prostitutes and their clients, until lighting was improved following the drowning of Selina Rushbrook in the lock in 1907. The North Dock closed in 1930 after the development of new larger docks on the east side of the River Tawe made it obsolete. The north dock has since been filled in and the Parc Tawe retail complex was built on the site in the late 1980s.

=== South Dock ===
Swansea Dock Act 1847
- Act of Parliament
- Parliament of the United Kingdom
- Citation: 10 & 11 Vict. c. cxxiii An Act for constructing and maintaining Docks and other Works at or near the South Side of the Town of Swansea in the Town and Franchise of Swansea in the County of Glamorgan.
- Territorial extent: United Kingdom

Dates
- Royal assent: 2 July 1847
- Commencement: 2 July 1847
Other legislation
Amended by	Swansea Dock Amendment Act 1850

Status: Amended

Swansea Harbour Amendment Act 1847 (Note: Section 21.)
- Act of Parliament
- Parliament of the United Kingdom
- Long title: An Act to amend the several Acts relating to Swansea Harbour.
- Citation: 10 & 11 Vict. c. cclx
- Territorial extent: United Kingdom

Dates
- Royal assent: 22 July 1847
- Commencement: 22 July 1847
- Repealed: 1 September 1854
Other legislation
Amends	Swansea Harbour Amendment Act 1804; Swansea Harbour Act 1836; Swansea Harbour Acts Amendment Act 1844
Repealed by	Swansea Harbour Act 1854
Relates to	Swansea Harbour Act 1791

Status: Repealed

Text of statute as originally enacted

Swansea Dock Amendment Act 1850 (Note: Section 11.)
- Act of Parliament
- Parliament of the United Kingdom
- Long title: An Act for extending the Times limited by "The Swansea Dock Act, 1847," for the compulsory Purchase of Lands and Execution of Works; and for other Purposes.
- Citation: 13 & 14 Vict. c. xlvii
- Territorial extent: United Kingdom

Dates
- Royal assent: 15 July 1850
- Commencement: 15 July 1850
- Repealed: 10 August 1857
Other legislation
Amends	Swansea Dock Act 1847
Repealed by	Swansea Harbour Act 1857

Status: Repealed

Text of statute as originally enacted

Swansea Harbour Act 1854 (Note: Section 1.)
- Act of Parliament
- Parliament of the United Kingdom
- Long title: An Act for the Conservancy and Improvement of Swansea Harbour, and for other Purposes, and of which the Short Title is "The Swansea Harbour Act, 1854."
- Citation: 17 & 18 Vict. c. cxxvi
- Territorial extent: United Kingdom

Dates
- Royal assent: 3 July 1854
- Commencement: 1 September 1854 (Note: Section 2.)
Other legislation
Repeals/revokes	Swansea Harbour Amendment Act 1804; Swansea Harbour Acts Amendment Act 1844; Swansea Harbour Amendment Act 1847
Amended by	Swansea Harbour Act 1859; Swansea Harbour Act 1864; Swansea Harbour Act 1876; Swansea Harbour Act 1894; Swansea Harbour Act 1907; Pilotage Orders Confirmation (No. 5) Act 1921; Post Office Act 1969; British Transport Docks Act 1969; Swansea City Council (Tawe Barrage) Act 1986

Status: Amended

Text of statute as originally enacted

Swansea Dock Amendment Act 1855
- Act of Parliament
- Parliament of the United Kingdom
- Long title: An Act to authorize certain Arrangements with respect to the Capital of the Swansea Dock Company.
- Citation: 18 & 19 Vict. c. lviii
- Territorial extent: United Kingdom]

Dates
- Royal assent: 15 June 1855

Text of statute as originally enacted

Swansea Harbour Act 1857
- Act of Parliament
- Parliament of the United Kingdom
- Long title: An Act for the Transfer of the Docks of the Swansea Dock Company to the Swansea Harbour Trustees; and for authorizing those Trustees to make further Works, and raise further Moneys; and for other Purposes.
- Citation: 20 & 21 Vict. c. cxlii
- Territorial extent: United Kingdom

Dates
- Royal assent: 10 August 1857
- Commencement: 10 August 1857

Status: Current legislation

Text of statute as originally enacted

Swansea Harbour Act 1859
- Act of Parliament
- Parliament of the United Kingdom
- Long title: An Act to extend the Period limited by "The Swansea Harbour Act, 1854," for the Construction and Completion of the Works thereby authorized.
- Citation: 22 & 23 Vict. c. xlvii

Dates
- Royal assent: 1 August 1859
Other legislation
Amends	Swansea Harbour Act 1854
Amended by	Swansea Harbour Act 1860

Swansea Harbour Act 1860
- Act of Parliament
- Parliament of the United Kingdom
- Long title: An Act to extend the Period limited by "The Swansea Harbour Act, 1859," for the Construction and Completion of the Works authorized by "The Swansea Harbour Act, 1854."
- Citation: 23 & 24 Vict. c. cxxxv

Dates
- Royal assent: 3 July 1860
Other legislation
Amends	Swansea Harbour Act 1859

Swansea Harbour Act 1861
- Act of Parliament
- Parliament of the United Kingdom
- Long title: An Act to enable the Swansea Harbour Trustees to raise a further Sum of Money for the Purposes of their Undertaking.
- Citation: 24 & 25 Vict. c. ccxxii

Dates
- Royal assent: 1 August 1861

Swansea Harbour Act 1862
- Act of Parliament
- Parliament of the United Kingdom
- Long title: An Act to enable the Swansea Harbour Trustees to raise a further Sum of Money for the Purposes of their Undertaking; and to authorize a Lease or Leases of the Swansea Harbour Railway and certain Wharves in Swansea Harbour to the Vale of Neath Railway Company; and to authorize the laying down of additional Rails for the Narrow Gauge on that Railway.
- Citation: 25 & 26 Vict. c. clxvii

Dates
- Royal assent: 17 July 1862

Text of statute as originally enacted

Swansea Harbour Act 1864
- Act of Parliament
- Parliament of the United Kingdom
- Long title: An Act to enable the Swansea Harbour Trustees to construct additional Works, and to raise a further Sum of Money for the Purposes of their Undertaking; and for other Purposes.
- Citation: 27 & 28 Vict. c. xli
- Territorial extent: United Kingdom

Dates
- Royal assent: 23 June 1864
Other legislation
Amends	Swansea Harbour Act 1854

Swansea Harbour Act 1866
- Act of Parliament
- Parliament of the United Kingdom
- Long title: An Act to enable the Swansea Harbour Trustees to complete and maintain additional Works, and to raise a further Sum of Money for the Purposes of their Undertaking; and for other Purposes.
- Citation: 29 & 30 Vict. c. cclviii

Dates
- Royal assent: 23 July 1866

Text of statute as originally enacted

Swansea Harbour Act 1873
- Act of Parliament
- Parliament of the United Kingdom
- Long title: An Act to enable the Swansea Harbour Trustees to raise a further sum of money for the purposes of their Undertaking; and for other purposes.
- Citation: 36 & 37 Vict. c. xxxii

Dates
- Royal assent: 15 May 1873

Construction of the South Dock was begun in 1852 by a private company, the Swansea Dock Company, authorised by the Swansea Dock Act 1847 (10 & 11 Vict. c. cxxiii). It was built on a site west of the River Tawe, just south of the North Dock and was not completed until 1859, having been transferred to the Swansea Harbour Trust by the Swansea Harbour Act 1857 (20 & 21 Vict. c. cxlii). The South Dock was closed in 1971 and was redeveloped in the 1980s. The dock itself became the Swansea Marina and the land around the dock was developed as the Maritime Quarter residential area.

=== Prince of Wales Dock ===
Swansea Harbour Act 1874
- Act of Parliament
- Parliament of the United Kingdom
- Long title: An Act to enable the Swansea Harbour Trustees to construct additional Docks, Railways, and other Works; and for other purposes.
- Citation: 37 & 38 Vict. c. civ

Dates
- Royal assent: 16 July 1874

Swansea Harbour Act 1876
- Act of Parliament
- Parliament of the United Kingdom
- Long title: An Act to confirm Agreements between the Swansea Harbour Trustees and the Corporation of Swansea, the Great Western and the Midland Railway Companies, for the leasing to that Corporation and to those Companies of Wharves and other accommodation at the Docks authorised to be constructed by the Swansea Harbour Act, 1874; and for other purposes.
- Citation: 39 & 40 Vict. c. clxxxviii

Dates
- Royal assent: 24 July 1876
Other legislation
Amends	Swansea Harbour Act 1854

Text of statute as originally enacted

Swansea Harbour (Extension of Time) Act 1880
- Act of Parliament
- Parliament of the United Kingdom
- Long title: An Act for extending the time limited by the Swansea Harbour Act, 1874, for the completion of the Docks, Railways, and Works by that Act authorised, and for enabling the Earl of Jersey to act as a Harbour Trustee.
- Citation: 43 & 44 Vict. c. lv

Dates
- Royal assent: 9 July 1880

Text of statute as originally enacted

Swansea Harbour Act 1883
- Act of Parliament
- Parliament of the United Kingdom
- Long title: An Act to extend the time limited by the Swansea Harbour Act 1874 for the completion of the Docks Railways and Works by that Act authorised; to enable the Swansea Harbour Trustees to raise a further sum of Money for the purposes of their Undertaking; and to annul a certain Agreement between the Swansea Harbour Trustees and the Corporation of Swansea.
- Citation: 46 & 47 Vict. c. xx

Dates
- Royal assent: 18 June 1883

Swansea Harbour Act 1886
- Act of Parliament
- Parliament of the United Kingdom
- Long title: An Act to enable the Swansea Harbour Trustees to construct and maintain additional Works and conveniences within Swansea Harbour; to raise further Money and to issue Stock; and for other purposes.
- Citation: 49 & 50 Vict. c. lxv

Dates
- Royal assent: 25 June 1886

Text of statute as originally enacted

Pilotage Order Confirmation Act 1892
- Act of Parliament
- Parliament of the United Kingdom
- Long title: An Act to confirm a Provisional Order made by the Board of Trade under the Merchant Shipping Act Amendment Act, 1862, relating to the Pilotage District of Swansea.
- Citation: 55 & 56 Vict. c. xxxi

Dates
- Royal assent: 20 May 1892
Other legislation
Relates to	Merchant Shipping Act Amendment Act 1862

Text of statute as originally enacted

Swansea Harbour Act 1894
- Act of Parliament
- Parliament of the United Kingdom
- Long title: An Act to authorise the Swansea Harbour Trustees to enlarge and extend the Prince of Wales Dock at Swansea and for other purposes.
- Citation: 57 & 58 Vict. c. cv
- Territorial extent: United Kingdom

Dates
- Royal assent: 20 July 1894
Other legislation
Amends	Swansea Harbour Act 1854

Text of statute as originally enacted

Swansea Harbour Act 1895
- Act of Parliament
- Parliament of the United Kingdom
- Long title: An Act to authorise the Swansea Harbour Trustees to make a New Opening or Swing Bridge over the New Cut to construct a Lock or half-tide Basin and certain Railways Roads and Works to borrow further money and for other purposes.
- Citation: 58 & 59 Vict. c. cx

Dates
- Royal assent: 6 July 1895

Text of statute as originally enacted

Swansea Harbour Act 1896
- Act of Parliament
- Parliament of the United Kingdom
- Long title: An Act to authorise the Swansea Harbour Trustees to make a new entrance to the half-tide Basin of the Town Float to construct a Lock to form a new entrance to the half-tide Basin of the South Dock a Railway and other works to borrow further money and for other purposes.
- Citation: 59 & 60 Vict. c. cxli

Dates
- Royal assent: 20 July 1896

Text of statute as originally enacted

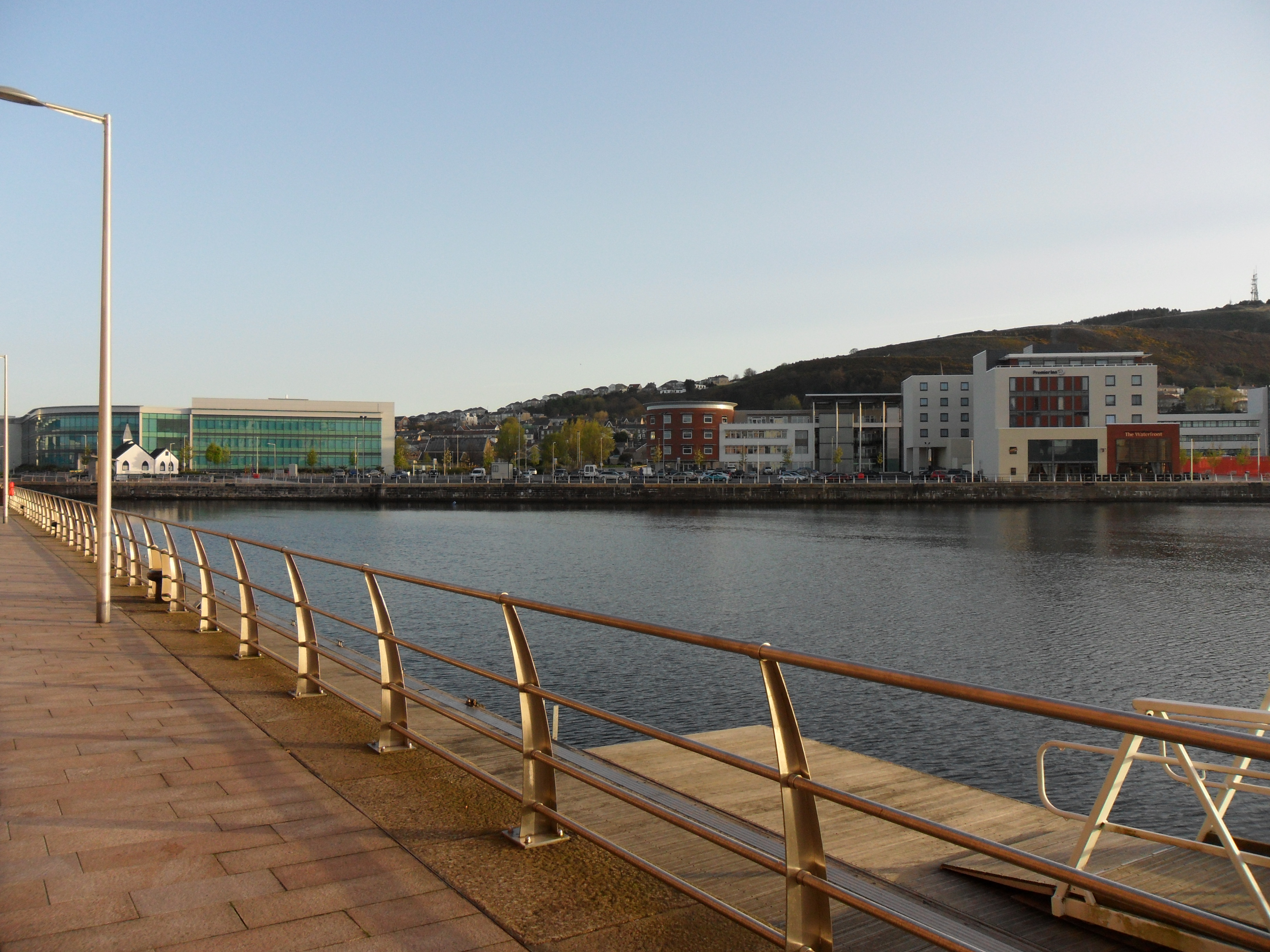
Prince of Wales Dock, April 2011

The Swansea Harbour Trust gained authorisation for expansion in the Swansea Harbour Act 1874 (37 & 38 Vict. c. civ), and began constructing the Prince of Wales Dock in 1879 on Fabian's Bay to the east of the River Tawe. When construction was completed, the Prince of Wales dock was opened on 18 October 1881 by Edward, Prince of Wales, and extended in 1898 to its present size of 27 acres (11 ha). Usage of the dock declined throughout the latter half of the 20th century. The Prince of Wales Dock is now being redeveloped as the Prince of Wales Marina with 500 berths. A new channel with sea lock and holding basin was built to link the marina directly with the River Tawe. A cable-operated wakeboarding facility opened in the Prince of Wales Dock in 2010, but was short-lived. The dock is the site of the swim section of the annual Swansea Triathlon.

=== King's Dock ===
Swansea Harbour Act 1901
- Act of Parliament
- Parliament of the United Kingdom
- Long title: An Act to authorise the Swansea Harbour Trustees to make a new dock enlarge and extend the half-tide basin of the South Dock and construct new railways to extend the limits of the harbour and for other purposes.
- Citation: 1 Edw. 7. c. ccliii

Dates
- Royal assent: 17 August 1901

Text of statute as originally enacted

Swansea Harbour Act 1907
- Act of Parliament
- Parliament of the United Kingdom
- Long title: An Act to authorise the Swansea Harbour Trustees to further extend the West Pier of Swansea Harbour, and to construct a breakwater on the eastern side of the entrance channel of the said harbour, and for other purposes.
- Citation: 7 Edw. 7. c. cxli

Dates
- Royal assent: 21 August 1907
Other legislation
Amends	Swansea Harbour Act 1854

Text of statute as originally enacted

Swansea Harbour Act 1913
- Act of Parliament
- Parliament of the United Kingdom
- Long title: An Act for conferring further powers upon the Swansea Harbour Trustees.
- Citation: 3 & 4 Geo. 5. c. vi

Dates
- Royal assent: 4 July 1913

Text of statute as originally enacted

Swansea Harbour Act 1916
- Act of Parliament
- Parliament of the United Kingdom
- Long title: An Act to postpone the repayment of certain mortgages granted by the Swansea Harbour Trustees and for other purposes.
- Citation: 6 & 7 Geo. 5. c. vii

Dates
- Royal assent: 25 May 1916

Text of statute as originally enacted

Swansea Harbour Act 1919
- Act of Parliament
- Parliament of the United Kingdom
- Long title: An Act to further postpone the times for the repayment of moneys borrowed by the Swansea Harbour Trustees and for other purposes.
- Citation: 9 & 10 Geo. 5. c. xviii

Dates
- Royal assent: 3 June 1919

Text of statute as originally enacted

Great Western Railway (Swansea Harbour Vesting) Act 1923
- Act of Parliament
- Parliament of the United Kingdom
- Long title: An Act to provide for the vesting of the undertaking of the Swansea Harbour Trustees in the Great Western Railway Company, and for other purposes.
- Citation: 13 & 14 Geo. 5. c. xix

Dates
- Royal assent: 18 July 1923

Work began on the King's Dock in 1905, having been authorised by the Swansea Harbour Act 1901 (1 Edw. 7. c. ccliii) to meet the growing demand of tinplate exports from the local area. The King's Dock was constructed as a much larger dock than the Prince of Wales on the south side of the Prince of Wales Dock and covers some 72 acres (29 ha). Construction was complete by 1909. The King's Dock is the principal dock in the Port of Swansea which is still in use today for cargo operations.

=== Queen's Dock ===
At the same time as the King's Dock was being built, a breakwater was constructed further south which enclosed a large body of water, some 151 acres (61 ha). This body of water was opened in 1920 as the Queen's Dock after oil handling facilities were built to handle imports for the nearby BP oil refinery at Llandarcy and petrochemical plant at Baglan Bay. Usage of the Queen's Dock reached its peak in the 1950s when oil imports and exports were around 8 million tonnes per year. Since the closure of the plants at Baglan Bay and Llandarcy, the Queen's Dock was rendered obsolete as an oil handling facility and is now used for mussel farming.

== History ==
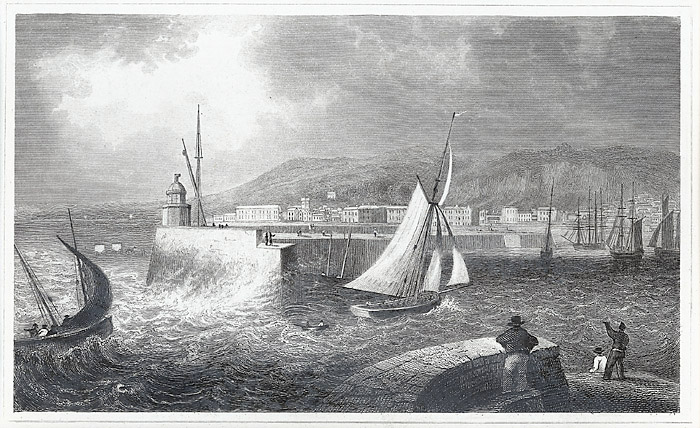
Entrance to Swansea harbour, Glamorganshire, 1830

The international steamship agents M. Jones and Bro. (1856 - 1942) operated out of the South Dock, Swansea Docks, and its director Ernest William Jones, who also was a first-class cricketer for Swansea and Glamorgan, was a member of the Port Employers' Association, a Fellow of the Institute of Chartered Shipbrokers, and Chairman of the Swansea Pilotage Authority from 1930 until 1941.

Due to increases in industrial output and in trade of copper, zinc, iron, and tinplate, combined with the developments in shipping (big steamships were replacing smaller sailing vessels) by the late 19th century, Swansea's harbour was in desperate need of expansion. The Swansea Harbour Trust (SHT) commissioned the construction of the Prince of Wales Dock, the first on the east side of the river. Opened in 1881 by the Prince and Princess of Wales (later Edward VII and Queen Alexandra), it was completed in 1882 and expanded in 1898. The North Quay frontage was let to the Great Western Railway, the Neath and Brecon Railway and the Rhondda and Swansea Bay Railway, which linked the Dulais Valley and Rhondda Valley coalfields directly with the docks. In addition to shunting locomotives operated by the SHT, further engines were provided by Powlesland and Mason from 1903 onwards.

== Port of Swansea ==
The Port of Swansea is an Atlantic shipping port operated by Associated British Ports which comprises the King's Dock, Queen's Dock, two dry docks and a roll-on/roll-off ferry terminal in the River Tawe.

=== Facilities ===
The port has three transit sheds with 25,000 m^{2} (270,000 sq ft) of storage space, 12 quayside cranes, two drydocks, a roll-on/roll-off berth. It offers warehouses and facilities for handling dry bulks, minerals, ores, forest products and general cargo.

=== Ferry services ===
There is a roll-on/roll-off ferry terminal in the western part of the docks. Between 1987 and 2006, Swansea Cork Ferries operated a regular passenger and car ferry to Ringaskiddy in County Cork, Ireland. The service was suspended from 2007. A website and online campaign was started in an attempt to highlight the effect that the loss of the ferry was having on Swansea and the South-West of Ireland. In April 2009, a newly formed co-operative using the Fastnet Line brand purchased MV Julia to provide a service between Swansea and County Cork. Sailings commenced on 10 March 2010 but ceased as unviable in November 2011, in part owing to increased fuel costs.

== Nearest places ==
- Maritime Quarter
- Swansea city centre
- St Thomas
- Port Tennant
- Crymlyn Burrows
- Jersey Marine beach
- Swansea Beach
