= Port Tennant =

District in Swansea, Wales

Coordinates: 51°37′25.00″N 3°54′57.00″W

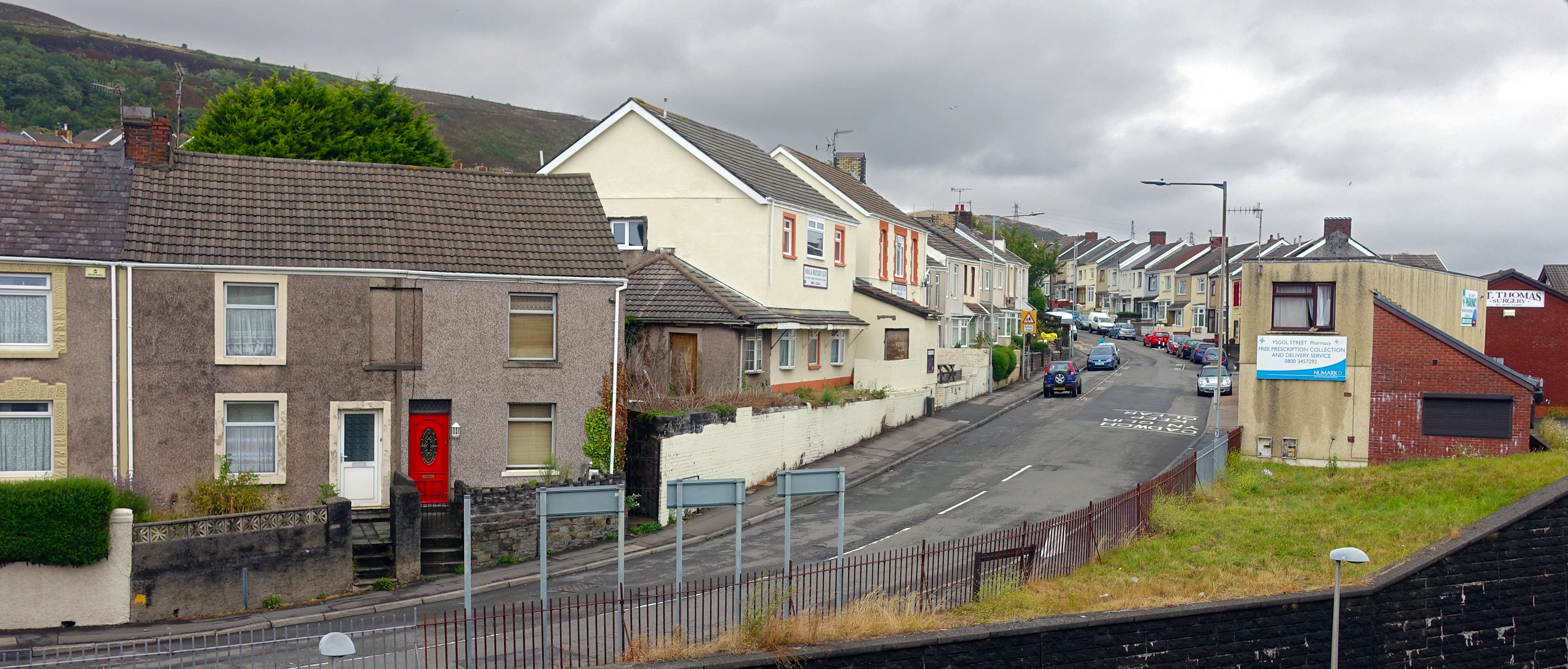
Port Tennant

Port Tennant is a suburban district of Swansea, Wales, falling within the St. Thomas ward. Port Tennant lies at the southern foot of Kilvey Hill just east of St. Thomas and is bounded by the Fabian Way to the south. It is a mostly residential area and is the location of one of Swansea's largest public cemeteries - Danygraig Cemetery.

The area takes its name from the Tennant family who developed the Tennant Canal and were responsible for developing the area. The Tennant Canal terminates at the Vale of Neath Inn (now closed) in the south-east of Port Tennant.

Local amenities include the Danygraig Primary School, a few playing fields to the east, a small park for relaxing, a doctors' surgery, some clubs, and public houses. There is also a graveyard, churches, and some handy shops and takeaways (Indian, Chinese, etc.) on Port Tennant Road. There is a 550-car space park and ride site just south of the district, off Fabian Way, with dedicated buses to Swansea city centre.

There is a new bridge over Fabian Way linking Port Tennant to the docks and SA1 area. The Kilvey woodland is a great place to walk a see the panoramic views of Swansea Bay and beyond. There are horses stables on the side of the mountain, and hotels, car dealerships, petrol stations, and post offices, all within Port Tennant. The Tir John landfill site and adjacent civic amenity site is located east of the residential area.

The neighbouring areas are Crymlyn Burrows, Crymlyn Bog, Kilvey Community Woodland, Swansea Docks, and St. Thomas.
