= Iain McIntosh =

Welsh politician

Iain McIntosh MS
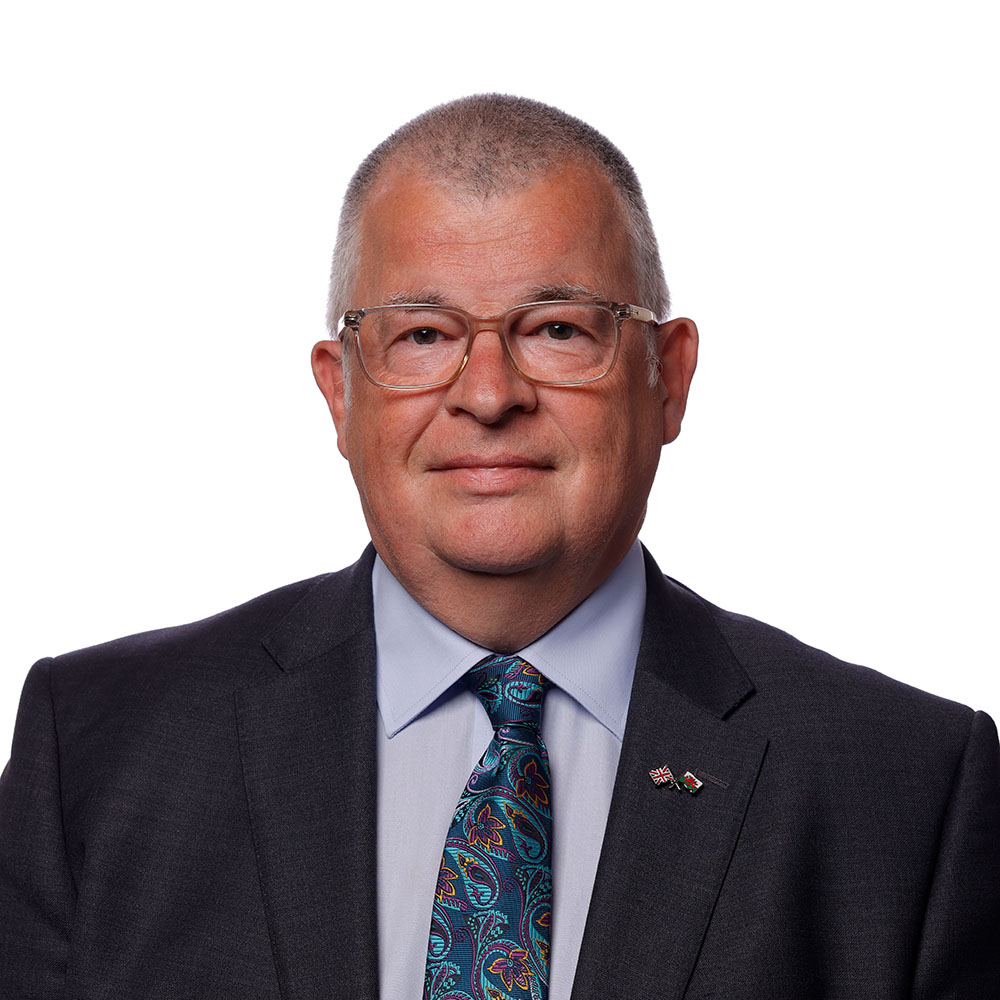
- Official portrait, 2026

Shadow Cabinet Minister for Government Efficiency
- Incumbent
- Assumed office 23 September 2026
- Leader: Helen Jenner
- Preceded by: Cai Parry-Jones

Member of the Senedd
- Incumbent
- Assumed office 8 May 2026
- Preceded by: Constituency established
- Constituency: Brycheiniog Tawe Nedd

Personal details
- Party: Reform UK (2025–present)

Iain Charles McIntosh is a Welsh Reform UK politician serving as a Member of the Senedd (MS) for Brycheiniog Tawe Nedd since 2026.

== Business career ==
From 1994 to 2026, McIntosh ran a carpet and flooring shop in Brecon with his wife Dawn. The couple closed the business in May 2026 following McIntosh's election to the Senedd, and passed the premises on to one of their employees.

== Political career ==
McIntosh was previously a member of the Welsh Conservatives, having first run successfully with the Tories in the 22 June 2017 Powys County Council by-election for the Yscir ward, and then being elected again in 2022.

In the 2026 Senedd election, McIntosh was elected as an MS for the Brycheiniog Tawe Nedd constituency.
