= Crymlyn Bog =

Nature reserve near Swansea, Wales

Coordinates: 51°38′11.00″N 3°53′18.00″W

Designations

Ramsar Wetland
- Official name: Crymlyn Bog
- Designated: 8 June 1993
- Reference no.: 608

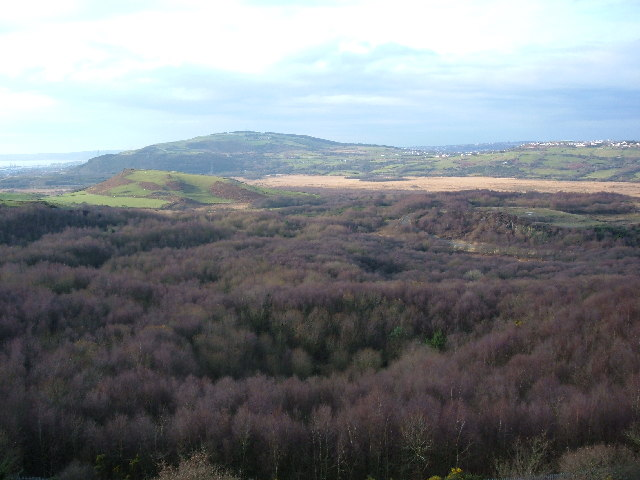
Pen isa'r coed, looking west across part of the old British Petroleum Oil refinery site to Crymlyn Bog in the distance

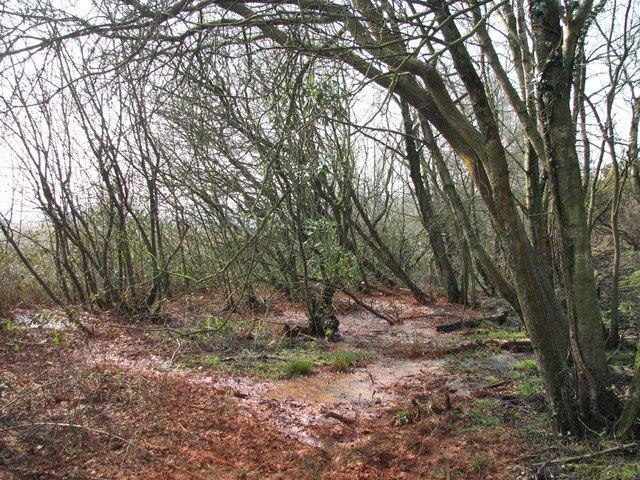
Crymlyn Bog

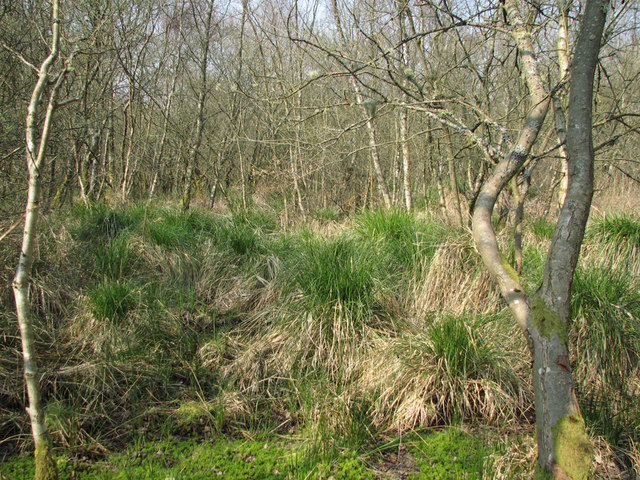
On the edge of Crymlyn Bog

Crymlyn Bog (Welsh: Cors Crymlyn) is a nature reserve and a designated Site of Special Scientific Interest of international significance, near Swansea, south Wales.

It is the largest area of lowland fen in Wales and lies immediately to the eastern side of Kilvey Hill just north of the industrial area of Crymlyn Burrows.

Plantlife found in the bog is more typical of that found in East Anglia. Habitats range from swamps, carr (fen), water meadows and tall reed beds to waterlogged scrub consisting mainly of willow, where wetter areas merge with woodland. There are a number of plants found in the wetland that are rare in Great Britain. Examples of these include the slender cotton grass and lesser water plantain. In 2003, surveys of Crymlyn Bog, Pant-y-Sais Fen and the inter-connecting wetlands identified the area as one of only three locations in the UK at which the fen raft spider is found. The extent of the population is unknown but the quality of habitat at the site is considered good enough for the population to be stable.

The reserve is a haven for birds. Predatory visitors like the hen harrier, buzzard, hobby and the occasional marsh harrier visit the site regularly. The site provides an important refuge for a range of wetland birds like the bittern, water rail, sedge and reed warblers, bearded tit and grey heron, which can often be seen or heard there.

There is a visitor centre in the bog, which is frequented by nature and bird watching enthusiasts.

== History ==
In previous inter-glacial periods the estuary of the River Clydach and River Neath once flowed through the valley now occupied by the wetland complex. Crymlyn Bog is an historic boundary between 'South' and 'West Wales', between the lordships of Glamorgan and Gower, and between the medieval and modern (i.e. until 1923) dioceses of St. David's and Llandaff.

Part of the land was previously owned by a BP oil refinery where oil from the refinery spilt out into the wetland changing its ecology. Crymlyn Bog was largely owned by the CEGB who used the fen to dump waste PFA and in this same area Swansea City Council used it as a landfill site. Small parts were owned by the Neath and Tennant Canal Company and some sections of the canal are still clear of emergent vegetation.

With the surrounding industrialisation, encroaching residential districts and a polluting landfill site beside it, it was uncertain that the bog would survive. Andrew Lees, who later became Campaigns Director of Friends of the Earth started a campaign with the Swansea branch of FoE to protect the bog. On an eastern limb of the bog is Pant-y-Sais fen, where there is a memorial to Mr Lees, which carries a quotation from him: "At some point I had to stand up and be counted. Who speaks for the butterflies?"
