= Crymlyn Burrows =

Area of Swansea, Wales

Coordinates: 51°37′17.00″N 3°53′24.00″W

Crymlyn Burrows (Welsh: Twyni Crymlyn) is an area in Wales to the east of Swansea city centre, and south of Crymlyn Bog. It is bounded by Jersey Marine Beach to the south and the River Neath to the east. The land west of Baldwin's Crescent falls within the City and County of Swansea and from Baldwin's Crescent eastwards falls within Neath Port Talbot. The area northwest of the Fabian Way contains a small settlement at Elba Crescent and Baldwins Crescent, and areas of industry and commerce.

== Nature reserve ==
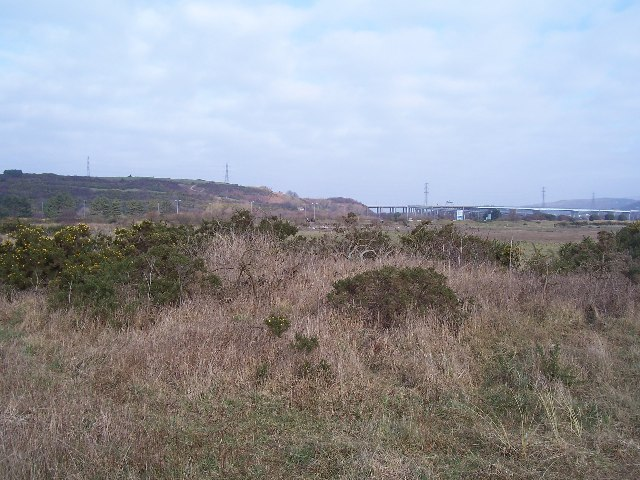
View of Crymlyn Burrows salt marsh looking towards the River Neath estuary

The undeveloped salt marsh area south of the Fabian Way and north Jersey Marine Beach is a designated biological Site of Special Scientific Interest and is one of the last remaining places of the Swansea Bay coastline that has remained unmodified by industrial development. The area contains sand dunes, a salt marsh and carr woodland. The burrows also contain a rare orchid - the Fen Orchid, Liparis loeselii. The 1,000-acre (400 ha) site was acquired by St. Modwen from BP in November 2009 and will be kept as a protected leisure destination.

== Industry and commerce ==
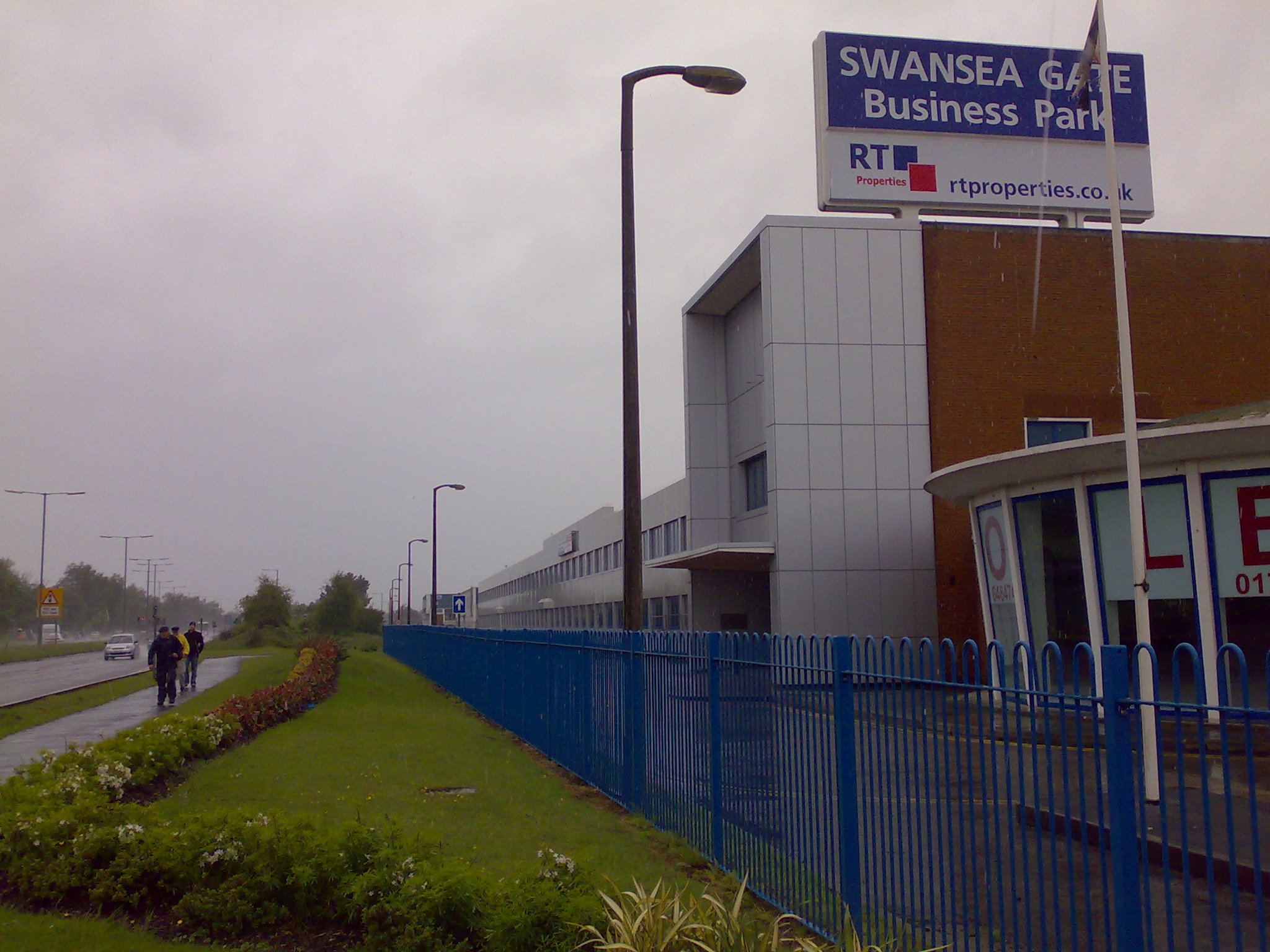
View along the Fabian Way outside the former Linamar transmission components factory offices

Industrial sites in the northeastern part of the area include the Linamar Elba Works site, the Gower Chemicals site, and Network Rail's Swansea Burrows yard.

Part of the Visteon industrial site was acquired by RT Properties in 2007 with Visteon consolidating their operations in the Elba Works plant. The part of the site which was sold includes factory premises and the offices and canteen buildings fronting the Fabian Way. The plant was built in 1959 for the Prestcold fridge company and was later acquired by Ford who manufactured car axle and transmission components there. Ford later transferred the site to Visteon. The 30-acre (12 ha) site acquired by RT properties has been re-developed as a business park branded Swansea Gate Business Park. The 24,600-square-metre (265,000 sq ft) car parts factory was later closed and is now used as a film studio.

BP has a storage site south east of the Fabian Way adjacent to Swansea Docks. Amazon has a 33-acre (13 ha) distribution centre just west of the Jersey Marine roundabout on the Fabian Way.

== Leisure ==
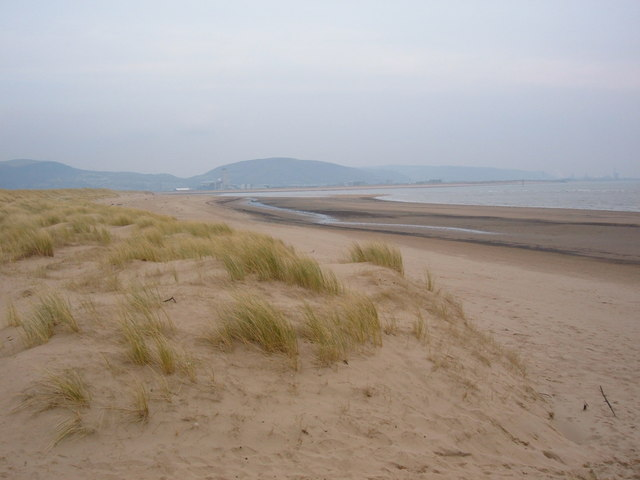
Jersey Marine beach

The 18 hole links golf course of the Swansea Bay Golf Club lies to the east of Jersey Marine village. It is the oldest golf club in the Swansea area. The marina of the Monkstone Sailing and Cruising Club is at Earlswood in the east of the area, under the M4 motorway viaduct, with access to the estuary of the River Neath.

== Fabian Way ==
Fabian Way is an arterial road which connects Swansea City Centre with the M4 motorway at junction 42. It forms a stretch of the A483 road. It is about 4.7 miles (7.6 km) long and cuts through the centre of Crymlyn Burrows in the unitary authorities of Swansea and Neath Port Talbot. Fabian Way is a dual carriageway for its whole length. The speed limit is 30 mph (48 km/h) between the city centre and Port Tennant, after which the limit rises to 40 mph (64 km/h) until the Jersey Marine traffic lights. The road is a standard national speed limit dual carriageway between Jersey Marine and the junction with the M4. It is considered to be the main entrance to Swansea City Centre.

== Swansea University ==
Swansea University has a 100-acre (40 ha) site south of Fabian Way as a second campus and innovation park. The development is on land previously used by BP as a petrochemicals transit site, which BP gifted to the university. The site stretches from Swansea Docks to Crymlyn Bog. Funding for the project was made available in September 2012 from the Welsh Government and the European Investment Bank. Construction work started on the site in 2013 and the main phase completed in 2015, with accommodation blocks added later. Companies which intended to establish research facilities at the site include Rolls-Royce, Hewlett-Packard, Tata, Bell Labs and BAE.

=== Buildings ===
The buildings were designed by Porphyrios Associates.

| Building | Architects | Year | Image |
|---|---|---|---|
| Active Classroom | | | |
| Bay Library | Porphyrios Associates | 2019 | |
| Centre For Integrative Semiconductor Materials | | 2023 | |
| Computational Foundry | Porphyrios Associates | 2018 | |
| Engineering Central | | | |
| Engineering East | | | |
| Engineering North – IMPACT | Porphyrios Associates | | |
| Energy Safety Research Institute (ESRI) | Porphyrios Associates | | |
| School of Management | Porphyrios Associates | | |
| The Great Hall | Porphyrios Associates | | |
| The College | Porphyrios Associates | 2018 | |

The student residences at the Bay Campus have been designed so that the internal space is modern and the external build stands the test of time in both design and the elements.

== Nearby places ==
- Swansea Docks
- Port Tennant
- Crymlyn Bog
- Jersey Marine
- Baglan Bay
